= Canadian Premier League playoffs =

Playoff phase of the Canadian Premier League

- Organiser(s): Canadian Premier League
- Founded: 2019 (finals only); 2021 (multiple rounds)
- Teams: 4
- Current champions: Atlético Ottawa (1st title)
- Most championships: Forge FC (4 titles)
- Website: Official website
- 2026 CPL playoffs

The Canadian Premier League playoffs (French: les éliminatoires de la Première Ligue canadienne) is the postseason phase of the Canadian Premier League to determine that year's league champion. It was first contested as a multi-round elimination tournament in the 2021 season, to replace previous methods of determining the participants of the Canadian Premier League Finals, which used an Apertura and Clausura format in 2019, and an additional group stage in 2020. The winner of the playoffs is awarded the North Star Cup trophy, and receives the second Canadian berth into the next season's CONCACAF Champions Cup.

== Format ==
=== Summary ===
Season	League teams	Playoff teams	% of teams	Rounds	Matches	Format
2019	7	2	28.6%	1	2	Final played as a two legged series.
2020	8	2 (Note: Originally planned to be a 3 team playoff until season was inturrupted by the COVID-19 pandemic.)	25%	1	1	Final played as single match.
2021	8	4	50%	2	3	Single match for all rounds.
2022	8	4	50%	2	5	Two legged semi-finals, final played as single match.
2023– 2025	8	5	62.5%	4	5	Page playoff system, all matches single legged.
2026– present	8	4	50%	2	5	Two legged semi-finals, final played as single match.

=== 2019 ===
The 2019 finals were contested between the winners of the spring and fall seasons. The championship was contested as a two-legged tie, with each team hosting one leg at home. The winner was determined by aggregate score but if the aggregate score was tied, the team with the most away goals wins the series. A penalty shoot-out was the final tiebreaker.

=== 2020 ===
The 2020 season saw the end of the split season format, with the 2020 finals scheduled to be contested between the top-seeded regular season team and the winner of a playoff between the second and third-placed teams. However, as a result of the COVID-19 pandemic, the season format was scrapped and replaced with a single-site tournament with a two-stage regular season. The 2020 final was contested in a single match between the two top-seeded teams from the four-team second stage.

=== 2021–2022; 2026–present ===
The 2021 season brought in a new four-team single leg knockout playoff with the two first round winners advancing to the final. The higher-seeded finalist hosts the single leg final. If a match is tied at the end of normal playing time, extra time is played (two periods of 15 minutes each) and, if necessary, followed by a penalty shoot-out to determine the winners.

Prior to the start of the 2022 season, the league announced that playoff semi-finals would switch to a two-legged format but that the final would continue to be played as a single match hosted by the higher-seeded team.

After a three year hiatus, the CPL returned to the format for the 2026 season.

2021

Semi-finals (hosted by top seed)
1	First-place team
4	Fourth-place team
2	Second-place team
3	Third-place team

Final (hosted by top seed)
Winner semi-final one
Winner semi-final two

2022; 2026

Semi-finals (2nd leg hosted by top seed)
1	First-place team
4	Fourth-place team
2	Second-place team
3	Third-place team

Final (hosted by top seed)
Winner semi-final one
Winner semi-final two

=== 2023–2025 ===
From 2023 to 2025, the CPL playoffs utilized a Page playoff system, where five of the league's eight teams advance to the playoffs. The system was first used in the 2023 season to replace the conventional Shaughnessy playoff system used in 2021 and 2022. The CPL chose to use the Page playoff system as it puts more emphasis on regular season performances.

Play-in round
4	Fourth-place team
5	Fifth-place team

First semifinal
1	First-place team
2	Second-place team
Quarterfinal
3	Third-place team
Play-in round winner

Second semifinal
First semifinal loser
Quarterfinal winner

Final
First semifinal winner
Second semifinal winner

== Results ==
=== Results by team ===
As of the 2025 season.

Team	App.	Series			Match statistics				Best result
Team	App.	Pld	W	L	Pld	W	D	L	Best result
Forge FC	7	13	8	5	15	9	1	5	Champions (4)
Cavalry FC	6	11	5	6	13	5	1	7	Champions (1)
Pacific FC	4	6	3	3	7	3	1	3	Champions (1)
Atlético Ottawa	3	6	4	2	7	2	2	2	Champions (1)
Inter Toronto FC	4	6	2	4	4	1	2	3	Semi-finals (1)
HFX Wanderers FC	3	3	0	3	3	0	1	2	Runners-up (1)
Vancouver FC	0	Active team has never qualified for playoffs							N/A
FC Edmonton	0	Defunct team has never qualified for playoffs							N/A
Valour FC	0	Defunct team has never qualified for playoffs							N/A

=== Year-by-year ===
Legend
§	Won CPL Shield

Season	Champion	Runner-up	Semi-finalist(s)	Top scorer(s)	
2019; Details	Forge FC	Cavalry FC ^{§}	N/A	(Canada) Tristan Borges (Canada) David Choinière	1
2020; Details	Forge FC	HFX Wanderers FC	N/A (Note: In 2020, a final four group stage was used instead of a playoff (semi-final) round to determine the finalists. Cavalry FC and Pacific FC were eliminated in that stage.)	(Sweden) Alexander Achinioti-Jönsson (Canada) Maxim Tissot	1
2021; Details	Pacific FC	Forge FC ^{§}	Cavalry FC York United FC	Seven players	1
2022; Details	Forge FC	Atlético Ottawa ^{§}	Cavalry FC Pacific FC	(Canada) David Choinière (Canada) Woobens Pacius	2
2023; Details	Forge FC	Cavalry FC ^{§}	Pacific FC (Note: Due to the Page playoff format, there was only one losing semi-finalist.)	(Somalia) Ali Musse	2
2024; Details	Cavalry FC	Forge FC ^{§}	Atlético Ottawa	(Syria) Molham Babouli (Germany) Tobias Warschewski	2
2025; Details	Atlético Ottawa	Cavalry FC	Forge FC ^{§}	(Germany) Tobias Warschewski	3

== Active playoff streaks ==
=== Playoff appearances ===
Updated through 2026 Canadian Premier League season. This list includes the four clubs that made the post-season in 2026. For the purposes of this section, the four-team group stage in 2020 is considered to be part of the post-season.

Club	Last miss of post-season	Length of streak
Cavalry FC	never (club joined in 2019)	8 seasons
Forge FC	never (club joined in 2019)	8 seasons
Atlético Ottawa	2023	3 seasons
FC Supra du Québec	never (club joined in 2026)	1 season

=== Finals appearances ===
Updated through 2025 Canadian Premier League final. This list includes the two finalist clubs from 2025.

Club	Last miss of finals	Length of streak
Cavalry FC	2022	3 seasons
Atlético Ottawa	2024	1 season

== Active playoff droughts ==
† – team is no longer playing in the Canadian Premier League.

=== Playoff appearances ===
Updated through 2026 Canadian Premier League season. This list does not include clubs that made the post-season in that year. For the purposes of this section, the four-team group stage in 2020 is considered to be part of the post-season.

Club	Last appearance in post-season	Length of drought
Valour FC †	never (club joined in 2019, folded after 2025)	7 seasons
FC Edmonton †	never (club joined in 2019, folded after 2022)	4 seasons
Vancouver FC	never (club joined in 2023)	4 seasons
Pacific FC	2024	2 seasons
HFX Wanderers FC	2025	1 season
York United FC	2025	1 season

=== Finals appearances ===
Updated through 2025 Canadian Premier League final. This list does not include the clubs that qualified in that year.

Club	Last appearance in finals	Length of drought
Valour FC †	never (club joined in 2019, folded after 2025)	7 seasons
Inter Toronto FC	never (club joined in 2019)	7 seasons
FC Edmonton †	never (club joined in 2019, folded after 2022)	4 seasons
HFX Wanderers FC	2020	5 seasons
Pacific FC	2021	4 seasons
Vancouver FC	never (club joined in 2023)	3 seasons
Forge FC	2024	1 season

=== Championships ===
Updated through 2025 Canadian Premier League final. This list does not include the club that won the championship in that year.

Club	Last championship	Length of drought
HFX Wanderers FC	never (club joined in 2019)	7 seasons
Valour FC †	never (club joined in 2019, folded after 2025)	7 seasons
Inter Toronto FC	never (club joined in 2019)	7 seasons
FC Edmonton †	never (club joined in 2019, folded after 2022)	4 seasons
Pacific FC	2021	4 seasons
Vancouver FC	never (club joined in 2023)	3 seasons
Forge FC	2023	2 seasons
Cavalry FC	2024	1 season

== Goalscorers ==
As of November 9, 2024

Rank	Player	Club(s)	Goals
1	(Canada) Tristan Borges	Forge FC	3
1	(Canada) David Choinière	Forge FC	3
1	(Canada) Alessandro Hojabrpour	Pacific FC, Forge FC	3
1	(Canada) Woobens Pacius	Forge FC	3
5	(Sweden) Alexander Achinioti-Jönsson	Forge FC	2
5	(Syria) Molham Babouli	Forge FC, York United FC	2
5	(Netherlands) Daan Klomp	Cavalry FC	2
5	(Somalia) Ali Musse	Cavalry FC	2
5	(Germany) Tobias Warschewski	Cavalry FC	2
10	(Canada) Béni Badibanga	Forge FC	1
10	(Northern Ireland) Ollie Bassett	Atlético Ottawa	1
10	(Canada) Kyle Bekker	Forge FC	1
10	(Canada) Myer Bevan	Cavalry FC	1
10	(Canada) Sergio Camargo	Cavalry FC	1
10	(Canada) Terran Campbell	Pacific FC, Forge FC	1
10	(Switzerland) Rubén del Campo	Atlético Ottawa	1
10	(Canada) Shola Jimoh	York United FC	1
10	(Mexico) Oswaldo León	York United FC	1
10	(The Gambia) Kekuta Manneh	Pacific FC	1
10	(Canada) Joe Mason	Cavalry FC	1
10	(Canada) Thomas Meilleur-Giguère	Pacific FC	1
10	(Costa Rica) Joshua Navarro	Forge FC	1
10	(England) Malik Owolabi-Belewu	Forge FC	1
10	(Canada) Michael Petrasso	York United FC	1
10	(Canada) Adonijah Reid	Pacific FC	1
10	(Canada) Malcolm Shaw	Atlético Ottawa	1
10	(Canada) Ballou Tabla	Atlético Ottawa	1
10	(Canada) Maxim Tissot	Forge FC, Atlético Ottawa	1
10	(Canada) Zach Verhoven	Atlético Ottawa	1

== See also ==
- MLS Cup playoffs
- Liga MX final phase
