= Loïc Cloutier =

Canadian soccer player (born 2004)

Personal information
- Date of birth: April 26, 2004 (age 22)
- Place of birth: Québec City, Québec, Canada
- Height: 1.80 m (5 ft 11 in)
- Position: Defender

Team information
- Current team: Atlético Ottawa
- Number: 28

Youth career
- FC Trois Lacs
- 2017–2022: CF Montréal

Senior career*
Years	Team	Apps	(Gls)
2022–2023	CF Montréal U23	32	(0)
2024	Ottawa South United	19	(0)
2025–	Atlético Ottawa	24	(0)

International career
2019	Canada U15		
2022	Canada U20	2	(0)
- * Club domestic league appearances and goals as of October 28, 2025

Loïc Cloutier (born April 26, 2004) is a Canadian professional soccer player who plays for Atlético Ottawa in the Canadian Premier League.

== Early life ==
Cloutier began playing youth soccer with FC Trois Lacs, before joining the CF Montréal Academy in the fall of 2017.

== Club career ==
In 2022, he began playing with CF Montréal U23 in the Première ligue de soccer du Québec (later renamed Ligue1 Québec). While with the team, he captained the side.

In 2024, Cloutier chose to depart the CF Montreal academy, and joined Ottawa South United, the Ligue1 Québec affiliate of Canadian Premier League club Atlético Ottawa, while also regularly training with the CPL side.

In February 2025, he signed a two-year professional contract with Canadian Premier League club Atlético Ottawa with an option for 2027.

== International career ==
In July 2019, he was named to the Canada U15 for the 2019 CONCACAF Boys' Under-15 Championship.

In June 2022, he was named to the Canada U20 side for the 2022 CONCACAF U-20 Championship.

== Career statistics ==
As of November 9, 2025

Appearances and goals by club, season and competition
Club	Season	League			Playoffs		Domestic cup		League cup		Total	
Club	Season	Division	Apps	Goals	Apps	Goals	Apps	Goals	Apps	Goals	Apps	Goals
CF Montréal U23	2022	Première ligue de soccer du Québec	12	0	–		–		–		12	0
CF Montréal U23	2023	Ligue1 Québec	20	0	–		–		1	0	21	0
CF Montréal U23	Total		32	0	0	0	0	0	1	0	33	0
Ottawa South United	2024	Ligue1 Québec	19	0	–		–		–		19	0
Atlético Ottawa	2025	Canadian Premier League	24	0	2	0	5	0	–		31	0
Career total			75	0	2	0	5	0	1	0	83	0

== Honours ==
Atlético Ottawa

- Canadian Premier League: 2025
