= Joaquim Coulanges =

Canadian soccer player (born 2006)

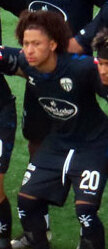
- Coulanges in 2026

Personal information
- Date of birth: November 3, 2006 (age 19)
- Place of birth: Montréal, Québec, Canada
- Position: Defender

Team information
- Current team: Atlético Ottawa
- Number: 20

Youth career
- CS Boucaniers
- 2015–2023: CF Montréal

Senior career*
Years	Team	Apps	(Gls)
2023	CF Montréal U23	8	(0)
2024	CS St-Hubert	12	(2)
2025–	Atlético Ottawa	19	(2)
- * Club domestic league appearances and goals as of October 28, 2025

Joaquim Coulanges (born November 3, 2006) is a Canadian professional soccer player who plays for Atlético Ottawa in the Canadian Premier League.

== Early life ==
Coulanges began playing youth soccer with CS Boucaniers, before joining the Montreal Impact Academy in 2015.

== Club career ==
In 2023, he played with CF Montréal U23 in Ligue1 Québec. In 2024, he played with CS St-Hubert.

In March 2025, he signed a two-year contract with options for 2027 and 2028 with Atlético Ottawa of the Canadian Premier League. He made his professional debut on April 5, 2025 againstHFX Wanderers FC. On April 26, 2025, he scored his first professional goal in a 3-0 victory over Cavalry FC.

== International career ==
In October 2022, Coulanges was called up to a training camp with the Canada U17 team.

In June 2024, he was named to the Haiti U20 60-man preliminary roster for the 2024 CONCACAF U-20 Championship.

== Career statistics ==
As of October 28, 2025

Appearances and goals by club, season and competition
Club	Season	League			Playoffs		Domestic cup		League cup		Total	
Club	Season	Division	Apps	Goals	Apps	Goals	Apps	Goals	Apps	Goals	Apps	Goals
CF Montréal U23	2023	Ligue1 Québec	8	0	–		–		0	0	8	0
CS St-Hubert	2024	Ligue1 Québec	12	2	–		–		1	0	13	2
Atlético Ottawa	2025	Canadian Premier League	19	2	1	0	3	0	–		23	2
Career total			39	4	1	0	3	0	1	0	44	4

== Honours ==
Atlético Ottawa

- Canadian Premier League: 2025
