= Kevin dos Santos =

Portuguese footballer (born 1999)

Kevin Dos Santos
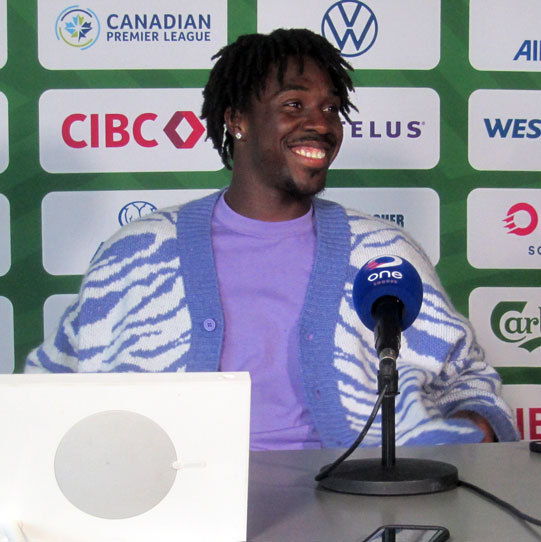
- dos Santos in 2023

Personal information
- Full name: Kevin David Nogueira Carvalho Santos
- Date of birth: 20 November 1999 (age 26)
- Place of birth: Alverca do Ribatejo, Portugal
- Position: Winger

Team information
- Current team: Derry City
- Number: 21

Youth career
- 2007–2012: Alverca
- 2016–2017: Vilafranquense
- 2017–2019: Vitória de Setúbal

Senior career*
Years	Team	Apps	(Gls)
2019–2021	Tadcaster Albion	25	(2)
2021–2022	Darlington	38	(4)
2022–2023	York United	40	(6)
2024–2025	Atlético Ottawa	36	(4)
2026–	Derry City	18	(4)
- * Club domestic league appearances and goals as of 12:38, 9 November 2026 (UTC)

Kevin David Nogueira Carvalho Santos (born 20 November 1999) is a Portuguese professional footballer who plays as a winger for League of Ireland Premier Division club Derry City.

== Career ==
=== Early career ===
dos Santos began his youth career in Portugal with Alverca. In 2013, he had a trial with the Manchester City Academy. He later played youth football with Vilafranquense and Vitória de Setúbal, eventually joining the U23 side of the latter.

=== Tadcaster Albion ===
In 2019, dos Santos joined Tadcaster Albion in the English eighth-tier Northern Premier League Division One North West. He made his debut against Prescot Cables.

=== Darlington ===
In July 2021, he joined Darlington of the sixth-tier National League North, after having impressed the club during an FA Cup match with Tadcaster against Darlington in the previous October. He scored his first goal on 2 October against AFC Telford United. His goal against AFC Fylde was named the Goal of the Season. During his only season at Darlington he scored four goals in 41 appearances across all competitions.

=== York United ===
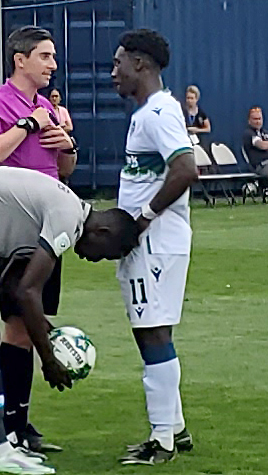
dos Santos with York United in 2022

On 12 July 2022, he joined Canadian Premier League club York United. He made his debut on 15 July against Pacific FC in a substitute appearance. On 14 May 2023, he scored directly from a corner kick for his first goal with the club, in a match against Pacific FC. He scored another highlight reel goal on June 21 against the HFX Wanderers.

=== Atlético Ottawa ===
In February 2024, he signed a two-year contract with Atlético Ottawa. He made his debut for Ottawa on 13 April against his former club York United.

=== Derry City ===
On 26 January 2026, dos Santos signed a two-year-contract with League of Ireland Premier Division club Derry City. On 8 November 2026, he came on from the bench in a 1–0 win over Waterford in the 2026 FAI Cup final at the Aviva Stadium.

== Career statistics ==
As of match played 8 November 2026

Appearances and goals by club, season and competition
Club	Season	League			National cup (Note: Includes FA Cup, Canadian Championship & FAI Cup)		Continental		Other		Total	
Club	Season	Division	Apps	Goals	Apps	Goals	Apps	Goals	Apps	Goals	Apps	Goals
Tadcaster Albion	2019–20	Northern Premier League (NPL); Division One North West	19	2	2	1	–		4 (Note: Appearance(s) in the FA Trophy)	1	25	4
Tadcaster Albion	2020–21	NPL Division One North West	6	0	4	0	–		1	0	11	0
Tadcaster Albion	Total		25	2	6	1	–		5	1	36	4
Darlington	2021–22	National League North	38	4	2	0	–		1	0	41	4
York United FC	2022	Canadian Premier League	14	0	0	0	–		—		14	0
York United FC	2023	Canadian Premier League	26	6	2	0	–		1 (Note: Appearance in the 2023 Canadian Premier League Playoffs)	0	29	6
York United FC	Total		40	6	2	0	–		1	0	43	6
Atlético Ottawa	2024	Canadian Premier League	9	0	0	0	–		1 (Note: Appearance in the 2024 Canadian Premier League Playoffs)	0	10	0
Atlético Ottawa	2025	Canadian Premier League	27	4	5	1	–		2 (Note: Appearances in the 2025 Canadian Premier League Playoffs)	0	34	5
Atlético Ottawa	Total		36	4	5	1	–		3	0	44	5
Derry City	2026	League of Ireland Premier Division	18	4	2	0	1 (Note: Appearance in the UEFA Europa League)	0	1 (Note: Appearance in the President of Ireland's Cup)	0	22	4
Career total			157	20	17	2	1	0	11	1	188	23

== Honours ==
Atlético Ottawa

- Canadian Premier League: 2025

Derry City

- FAI Cup: 2026
