= Capital City Supporters Group =

Soccer supporters' group

- Established: 2020
- Type: Supporters' group
- Team: Atlético Ottawa
- Motto: Our Club, Our Capital, Our City
- Location: Ottawa, Ontario
- Arena: TD Place
- Membership: 628
- Website: capitalcitysupporters.com

Capital City Supporters Group is an independent soccer supporters' group based in Ottawa, Ontario. The group is recognized by Canadian Premier League club Atlético Ottawa as one of it two main supporters groups, alongside the Bytown Boys.

== History ==
The Capital City Supporters Group was founded in 2020 in anticipation of the inaugural season of the Canadian Premier League's first expansion club Atlético Ottawa. Faced with the challenges of the COVID-19 pandemic, the club was unable to play games in front of spectators in their inaugural season and only hosted their first home match in July 2021. Despite being unable to provide support in the stands, CCSG membership created game recaps and podcasts to provide coverage and grow interest from fans of the club.

Despite moderate successes in growing the supporters group through the 2021 season, attracting a membership of approximately 100, the real growth of CCSG occurred in 2022. Founder Daniel Duff noted that this growth was a combination of a number of efforts by the existing membership as well as the successes of the Canadian national teams over the course of that same period. Over the course of 2022, membership grew to over 600. The marked growth of the supporters section also coincided with the success of Atlético Ottawa during the 2022 season, which saw the club win the Canadian Premier League regular season championship, and host the 2022 Canadian Premier League Final in front of 14,992 fans.

Outside of the group's efforts with Atlético, the group has also shown their support for the Canadian men's and women's national soccer teams. CCSG organized official watch parties for Canada's qualification run to the 2022 FIFA World Cup as well as their group stage matches during the competition.

== Gameday ==
For Atlético Ottawa gamedays, Capital City Supporters are seated in Section W, affectionately referred to by its membership as "the Dub". The various chants that echo through TD Place are born from a variety of sources, some modified from existing chants used by European and Latin American clubs while others are unique. The chants are also performed in multiple languages, English and French to represent the languages of the community in Ottawa as well as Spanish to reflect the roots of the club in Madrid. All of these chants can be found in the group's officially published "chant bible".

Capital City Supporters are also responsible for more elements of the growing atmosphere at TD Place. One such element is an inflatable dinosaur, named Wally, that has become an unofficial mascot for the club. The creature was first noticed by OneSoccer broadcaster Nigel Reed during a July 2022 Atlético Ottawa home game and has been referenced on broadcast multiple times since. One other fixture added by the group is the "Olliewood" sign, in the style of the famous Hollywood sign, erected on the hill behind the east goal in honour of 2022 Canadian Premier League player of the year, Ollie Bassett.

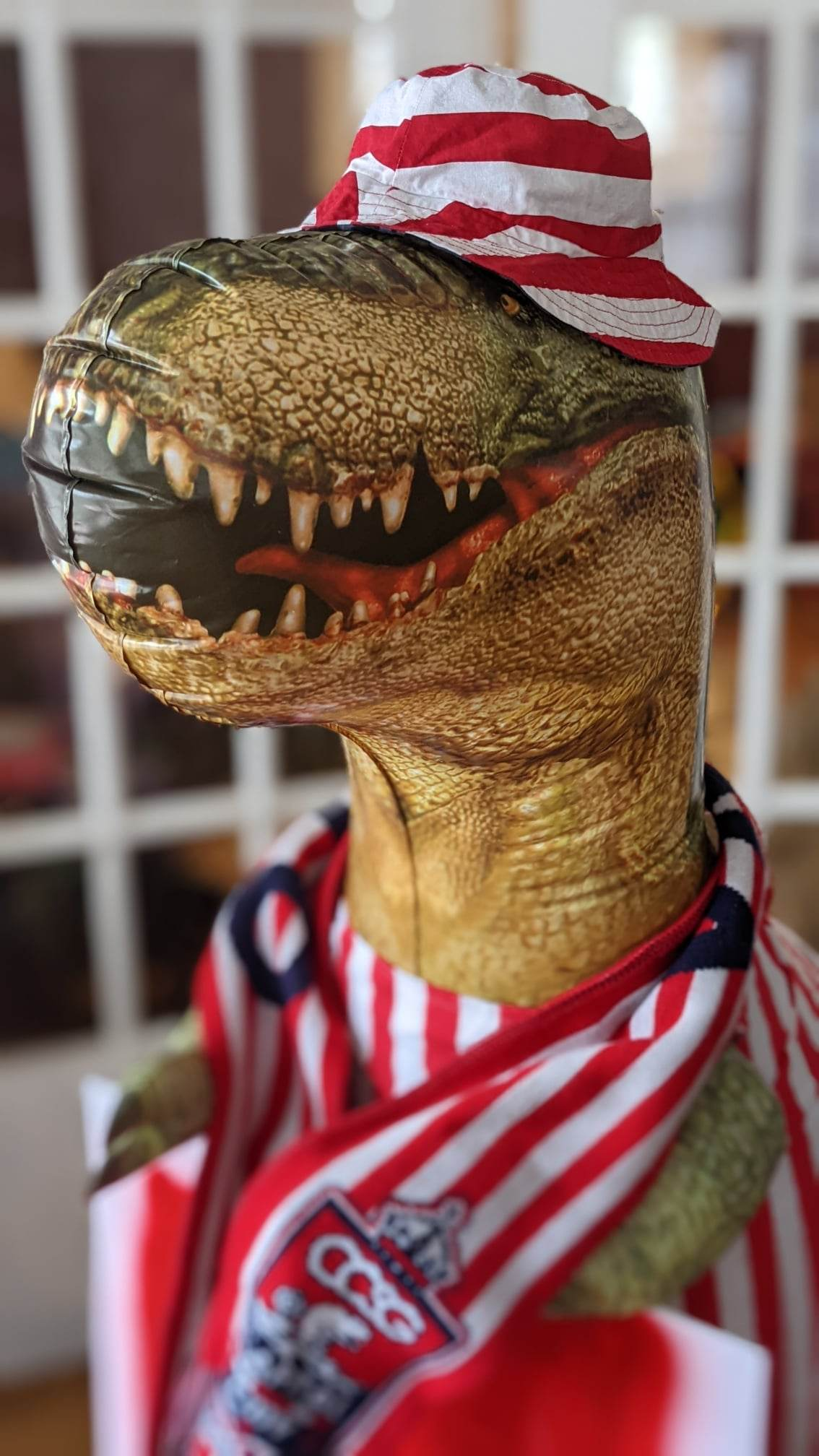
Wally the Dinosaur, the unofficial mascot of CCSG and Atlético Ottawa.

== Golden Scarf ==
Each season, Capital City Supporters Group members vote to nominate the three finalists for their player of the year award, which is then decided by the CCSG Founder's Council. In recognition of their play, the winner is awarded the CCSG Golden Scarf. In the words of founder Daniel Duff: "The most iconic symbol of a football supporter is their scarf. Cherished. Warn with pride. Held high throughout the national anthem and during our clubs finest moments. The Capital City Supporters Group honours this age old tradition by turning the supporters scarf into a symbol of excellence ... Each CCSG Golden Scarf Player of the Year Award is one of a kind."

Golden Scarf Winners
Season	Winner	Nominees
2021	Malcolm Shaw	Dylon Powley, Zach Verhoven
2022	Ollie Bassett	Ballou Tabla, Drew Beckie
