= Roni Mbomio =

Equatoguinean footballer (born 2005)

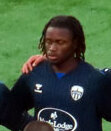
- Mbomio in 2026

Personal information
- Full name: Enmanuel Mbomio Angue
- Date of birth: 3 May 2005 (age 21)
- Place of birth: Alcalá de Henares, Spain
- Height: 1.85 m (6 ft 1 in)
- Position: Defender

Team information
- Current team: Atlético Ottawa

Youth career
- 2012–2024: Atlético Madrid

Senior career*
Years	Team	Apps	(Gls)
2024–2026	Atlético Madrid C	0	(0)
2024–2025	→ Collado Villalba (loan)	13	(1)
2025	→ Atlético Ottawa (loan)	6	(0)
2026–	Atlético Ottawa	9	(0)

International career^{‡}
2025–	Equatorial Guinea	5	(0)
- * Club domestic league appearances and goals as of 27 July 2026 ‡ National team caps and goals as of 25 September 2026

Enmanuel Mbomio Angue (born 3 May 2005), known as Roni Mbomio or Rony Mbomio, is a professional footballer who plays as a defender for Atlético Ottawa in the Canadian Premier League. Born in Spain, he plays for the Equatorial Guinea national team.

== Early life ==
Mbomio played youth football in the Atlético Madrid youth system since 2012.

== Club career ==
In January 2023, Mbomio signed a professional contract with Atlético Madrid. In September 2024, he joined Tercera Federación club Collado Villalba, who served as an affiliate club of Atlético Madrid for the season.

In August 2025, he joined Canadian Premier League club Atlético Ottawa on loan. He made his professional debut with Ottawa on 30 August 2025 against Vancouver FC. In November 2025, following the conclusion of his loan with Ottawa, with whom he won the league title, he returned to Atlético Madrid, joining the first team for training. In January 2026, he returned to Atlético Ottawa on a free transfer, signing a permanent contract for 2026, with an option for 2027.

== International career ==
In November 2025, Mbomio was called up to the Equatorial Guinea national team, ahead of a pair of friendlies. On 17 November 2025, Mbomio made his debut for Equatorial Guinea as a substitute against Madagascar.

== Personal life ==
Mbomio has dual Spanish and Equatorial Guinean nationality.

== Career statistics ==
As of 9 November 2025

Club	Season	League			Playoffs		National cup		Other		Total	
Club	Season	Division	Apps	Goals	Apps	Goals	Apps	Goals	Apps	Goals	Apps	Goals
Atlético Madrid	2024–25	La Liga	0	0	–		0	0	0	0	0	0
Collado Villalba (loan)	2024–25	Tercera Federación	13	1	–		–		–		13	1
Atlético Ottawa (loan)	2025	Canadian Premier League	6	0	2	0	1	0	–		9	0
Career total			19	1	2	0	1	0	0	0	22	1

== Honours ==
Atlético Ottawa

- Canadian Premier League: 2025
