= Tyr Walker =

Canadian soccer player (born 2003)

Tyr Duhaney-Walker
Personal information
- Full name: Tyr Carson Duhaney-Walker
- Date of birth: October 22, 2003 (age 23)
- Place of birth: Russell, Ontario, Canada
- Height: 6 ft 2 in (1.88 m)
- Position: Defender

Team information
- Current team: Atlético Ottawa
- Number: 4

Youth career
- Ottawa St. Anthony Futuro Academy
- 2022: Atlético Ottawa

College career
Years	Team	Apps	(Gls)
2021	Acadia Axemen	8	(0)

Senior career*
Years	Team	Apps	(Gls)
2023–	Atlético Ottawa	38	(1)
- * Club domestic league appearances and goals as of April 20, 2026

Tyr Carson Duhaney-Walker (born October 22, 2003) is a Canadian soccer player who plays for Atlético Ottawa in the Canadian Premier League.

== Early life ==
Born in Russell, Ontario, to a Brazilian mother and a Jamaican father, Walker moved to Belgium at age six with his family, before later moving back to his hometown in Canada three years later. Walker played youth soccer with the Ottawa St. Anthony Futuro Academy. In 2022, after being spotted by scouts from Atlético Ottawa, he participated in Atlético Ottawa's Atlético de Madrid Development program.

== University career ==
In 2021, he began attending Acadia University, where he played for the men's soccer team. He missed the 2022 season. In 2023, he transferred to Carleton University, however, he ultimately chose to turn professional instead.

== Club career ==
In 2023, he was invited to attend pre-season with Canadian Premier League club Atlético Ottawa, where he scored in a friendly against Spanish Primera Federación side UD San Sebastián de los Reyes. In April 2023, he signed a U Sports contract with the club, which allows him to maintain his university eligibility. He made his professional debut on May 13 as a late game substitute. On August 2, with his U Sports contract set to soon expire, he signed an extension for the remainder of the 2023 season. Following his first professional start on August 13 against Pacific FC, he was named to the CPL Team of the Week for the first time. After the season, he signed a professional contract with the club for the 2024 and 2025 seasons. Ahead of the 2025 season, he went on a training stint with their affiliate club in Mexico Atlético San Luis. In January 2026, he signed a two-year extension with the club.

== Career statistics ==
As of October 28, 2025

Club	Season	League			Playoffs		Domestic Cup		Continental		Total	
Club	Season	Division	Apps	Goals	Apps	Goals	Apps	Goals	Apps	Goals	Apps	Goals
Atlético Ottawa	2023	Canadian Premier League	5	0	—		0	0	—		5	0
Atlético Ottawa	2024	Canadian Premier League	16	0	2	0	1	0	—		19	0
Atlético Ottawa	2025	Canadian Premier League	15	0	1	0	3	0	—		19	0
Career total			36	0	3	0	4	0	0	0	43	0

== Honours ==
Atlético Ottawa

- Canadian Premier League: 2025
