= Samuel Salter =

Canadian soccer player

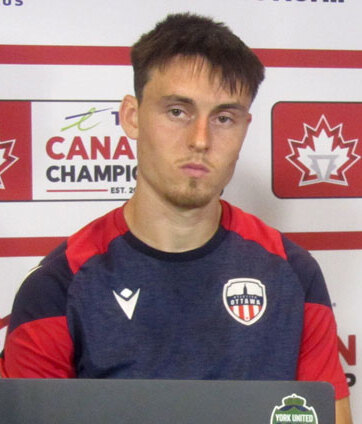
- Salter in 2025

Personal information
- Date of birth: September 8, 2000 (age 26)
- Place of birth: Laval, Quebec, Canada
- Height: 1.88 m (6 ft 2 in)
- Position: Forward

Team information
- Current team: Atlético Ottawa
- Number: 9

Youth career
- 2013–2016: Montreal Impact
- 2016–2017: Étoiles de l'Est
- 2018–2019: ASPTT Dijon

College career
Years	Team	Apps	(Gls)
2017	Dawson Blues	9	(9)
2019	Cal State Northridge Matadors	16	(3)

Senior career*
Years	Team	Apps	(Gls)
2018	CS St-Hubert	12	(4)
2020	AS Blainville	8	(8)
2021–2022	HFX Wanderers	48	(14)
2023–2025	Atlético Ottawa	83	(31)
2026–	GAIS	16	(5)
- * Club domestic league appearances and goals as of August 20, 2026

Samuel Salter (born September 8, 2000) is a Canadian professional soccer player who plays as a forward for GAIS in the Allsvenskan.

== Early life, family and education ==
Salter was raised in Laval, Quebec, and played in the Montreal Impact Academy from 2013 until 2016. Afterwards, he played with CS Étoiles de l'Est.

He attended high school at the ecole secondaire Antoine de Saint-Exupery where he was coached by Sandro Grande. He played for the Quebec provincial team, helping them to win a national bronze in 2017.

In 2018, he moved to France to join ASPTT Dijon in France's top U19 league. He also had a two-week trial with the U19 team RC Lens.

== College career ==
After graduating high school, he attended Dawson College in Quebec, in 2017, where he was the CCAA - ACSC Men's Soccer All-Canadian for the 2017, the RSEQ Rookie of the Year, Player of the Year and led the conference in scoring with nine goals in nine games. He was named the school's Athlete of the Year.

In 2019, he decided to attend California State University, Northridge in the United States, playing for the men's soccer team. He scored two goals, including the game-winning goal, in his debut on August 30, 2019, in the season opener against the Ohio State Buckeyes. earning him Big West Conference Freshman of the Week honours. At the end of the season, he was named to the Big West All-Freshman Team. Due to the COVID-19 pandemic, he was unable to return in-person to the school for his second year, eventually deciding to pursue a professional career and completing his degree online at a Canadian university.

== Club career ==
In 2018, he played for CS St-Hubert in the Première ligue de soccer du Québec.

In 2020, he returned to the PLSQ, playing with AS Blainville, helping them to the league title and finishing as the league's leading scorer, including two hat-tricks in back-to-back games.

In February 2021, Salter signed a one-year contract with club options for 2022 and 2023 with Canadian Premier League side HFX Wanderers. He scored his first professional goal on July 17 against Cavalry FC. In January 2022, HFX announced they had exercised the forward's contract option, keeping him at the club for the upcoming season. He finished as the team's top scorer in 2022, with 11 league goals.

On February 16, 2023, Salter joined fellow CPL side Atlético Ottawa for an undisclosed fee, signing a two-year deal, with a club option for 2025. This was the league's first ever intra-league transfer to command a fee. On May 13, 2023, he scored his first goal for the club in a victory over Vancouver FC. After the 2024 season, the club picked up his option for the 2025 season. On May 10, 2025, he set a league record, scoring four goals in one match, in a 5-2 victory over Valour FC. On August 30, 2025, he set the league record for the most goals in a single season, breaking the record of 14 by Alejandro Díaz, scoring his 15th in a match against Vancouver FC. He won the 2025 Golden Boot as the league's top scorer, scorer a league single-season record of 19 goals. He was also named the league's Player of the Year and the Players' Player of the Year, as selected by the players in the league.

In October 2025, he signed a pre-contract with Allsvenskan club GAIS to join the club upon the opening of the transfer window in January 2026 on a four-year contract, upon the expiry of his contract with Atlético Ottawa at the end of 2025.

== Career statistics ==
As of match played on August 20, 2026

Appearances and goals by club, season and competition
Club	Season	League			Playoffs		Domestic Cup		League Cup		Total	
Club	Season	Division	Apps	Goals	Apps	Goals	Apps	Goals	Apps	Goals	Apps	Goals
CS St-Hubert	2018	Première ligue de soccer du Québec	12	4	—		—		0	0	12	4
AS Blainville	2020	Première ligue de soccer du Québec	8	8	—		—		—		8	8
HFX Wanderers	2021	Canadian Premier League	21	3	—		1	0	—		22	3
HFX Wanderers	2022	Canadian Premier League	27	11	—		2	1	—		29	12
HFX Wanderers	Total		48	14	0	0	3	1	0	0	51	15
Atlético Ottawa	2023	Canadian Premier League	27	7	—		2	0	—		29	7
Atlético Ottawa	2024	Canadian Premier League	28	5	2	0	3	1	—		33	6
Atlético Ottawa	2025	Canadian Premier League	28	19	2	1	5	4	—		35	24
Atlético Ottawa	Total		83	31	4	1	10	5	0	0	97	37
GAIS	2026	Allsvenskan	16	5	0	0	5	1	0	0	21	6
Career total			168	62	4	1	18	7	0	0	190	70

== Honours ==
Atlético Ottawa

- Canadian Premier League: 2025

Individual

- Canadian Premier League Golden Boot: 2025
- Canadian Premier League Player of the Year: 2025
