= Antonio Álvarez (footballer, born 2003) =

Mexican footballer (born 2003)

Personal information
- Full name: Antonio Álvarez Villar
- Date of birth: 26 December 2003 (age 22)
- Place of birth: Heroica Córdoba, Mexico
- Height: 1.74 m (5 ft 8 1/2 in)
- Position: Midfielder

Team information
- Current team: Piratas
- Number: 11

Youth career
- 2008–2016: CD Fortín
- 2016–2017: Atlante
- 2019–2020: Guadalajara
- 2020–2022: Cruz Azul
- 2022–2025: Club América

Senior career*
| Years | Team | Apps | (Gls) |
| 2024–2026 | América | 4 | (1) |
| 2025 | → Atlético Ottawa (loan) | 3 | (0) |
| 2026– | Piratas | 0 | (0) |
- * Club domestic league appearances and goals as of 11 September 2026

Antonio Álvarez Villar, also known as Toño Álvarez (born 26 December 2003) is a Mexican professional footballer who plays for Piratas in Liga de Expansión MX.

== Early life ==
Álvarez began playing at age four with Club Deportivo Fortín (now known as Fuertes CDF). In 2016, he began playing with Atlante. After having departed Atlante a couple years earlier, in 2019, he joined the youth system of C.D. Guadalajara. In 2020, he joined the Cruz Azul youth system. In 2022, he joined the youth system of Club América.

== Club career ==
Álvarez played for Guadalajara B in the Mexican third tier.

On 12 July 2024, he made his debut for Club América in Liga MX against Querétaro. On 10 January 2025, he scored his first goal in Liga MX, in a 1–0 victory over Querétaro, in a match where America played the majority of its U23 squad.

In August 2025, he was loaned to Canadian Premier League club Atlético Ottawa. He made his debut on 10 August 2025 against Valour FC. At the end of the year he returned to América.

In June 2026 he signed with Piratas F.C. of the Liga de Expansión MX, the second tier of Mexican football.

== Career statistics ==
As of 11 September 2026

| Club | Season | League | | | Playoffs | | National cup | | Continental | | Other | | Total | |
| Club | Season | Division | Apps | Goals | Apps | Goals | Apps | Goals | Apps | Goals | Apps | Goals | Apps | Goals |
|---|---|---|---|---|---|---|---|---|---|---|---|---|---|---|
| América | 2024–25 | Liga MX | 4 | 1 | — | | — | | — | | — | | 4 | 1 |
| Atlético Ottawa (loan) | 2025 | Canadian Premier League | 3 | 0 | — | | 1 | 0 | — | | — | | 4 | 0 |
| Career total | | | 7 | 1 | 0 | 0 | 1 | 0 | 0 | 0 | 0 | 0 | 8 | 1 |
