= Noah Abatneh =

Canadian soccer player (born 2004)

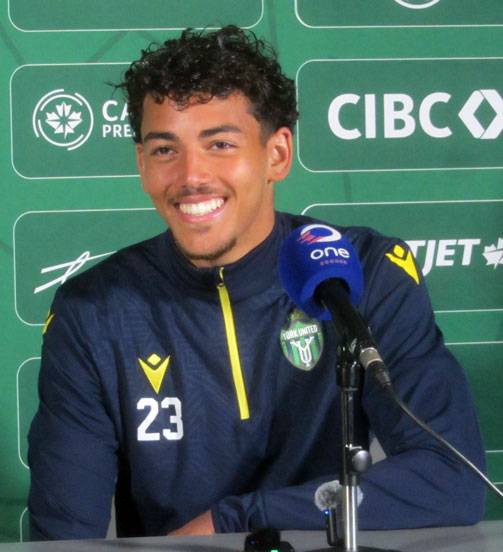
- Abatneh in 2024

Personal information
- Full name: Noah Abraham Sewonet Abatneh
- Date of birth: September 28, 2004 (age 22)
- Place of birth: Toronto, Ontario, Canada
- Height: 1.88 m (6 ft 2 in)
- Position: Defender

Team information
- Current team: Atlético Ottawa
- Number: 23

Youth career
- Ottawa St. Anthony SC
- Ottawa Royals SC
- 2016–2017: Roma
- 2017–2020: ASD Savio
- 2020–2022: Lazio

Senior career*
Years	Team	Apps	(Gls)
2022–2023	Lazio	0	(0)
2022–2023	→ Lamezia Terme (loan)	4	(0)
2023	→ Campodarsego (loan)	4	(0)
2023–2025	York United	34	(1)
2025–	Atlético Ottawa	23	(1)

International career^{‡}
2022	Canada U20	3	(0)
2026–	Canada B	1	(0)
- * Club domestic league appearances and goals as of October 28, 2025 ‡ National team caps and goals as of January 17, 2026

Noah Abraham Sewonet Abatneh (born September 28, 2004) is a Canadian soccer player who plays for Atlético Ottawa in the Canadian Premier League.

== Early life ==
Born in Toronto, Abatneh lived in both the Philippines and Egypt, before returning to Canada, moving to Ottawa in his childhood. Abatneh began playing youth soccer at age five with Ottawa St. Anthony Futuro Academy, also playing with the Ottawa Royals Futuro Academy. In 2014 at age nine, he went to England to train with the Arsenal academy and the Fulham academy, receiving an offer to join Fulham, but chose to remain in Canada. He returned to train with the two clubs again the following year.

In 2016, he moved to Italy and joined the A.S. Roma Youth Sector, following a three-month trial. He then joined the ASD Savio youth program. In June 2020, he joined the Lazio youth system.

== Club career ==
In September 2022, he was loaned by Lazio to Serie D club Lamezia Terme. On January 31, 2023, he was loaned to another Serie D club, Campodarsego.

In April 2023, he signed a one-year contract, with additional club options with Canadian Premier League club York United FC. With York United, he was converted to centre back after previously playing attacking midfield and right back earlier in his career. On May 20, he made his debut for the club against the HFX Wanderers. He made his first start on June 24, against Cavalry FC. On May 10, 2024, he scored his first goal in a 3-1 victory over Valour FC. At the end of the 2024 season, he was nominated for the league's Best Canadian Under-21 Player Award.

In January 2025, Abatneh signed a one-year contract with a club option for a second year with Atlético Ottawa. He scored his first goal for the club on April 19, 2025, netting the winning goal in stoppage time in a 3-2 victory over his former club York United.

== International career ==
Abatneh was born in Canada to an Ethiopian father and Canadian mother. In January 2021, he was called up to the Canada U20 for a camp. He was again called up in March 2022 for two friendlies against Costa Rica U20. Afterwards, he was named to the squad for the 2022 CONCACAF U-20 Championship.

In January 2026, he was named to the Canada senior team for the first time, for a training camp and friendly against Guatemala. He appeared in the match against Guatamala, however, as it was designated a B-level friendly, it did not count as an official senior cap.

== Career statistics ==
As of match played November 9, 2025

Club	Season	League			Playoffs		Domestic Cup		Other		Total	
Club	Season	Division	Apps	Goals	Apps	Goals	Apps	Goals	Apps	Goals	Apps	Goals
Lazio	2022–23	Serie A	0	0	—		0	0	0	0	0	0
Lamezia Terme (loan)	2022–23	Serie D	4	0	—		—		1 (Note: Appearance(s) in Coppa Italia Serie D)	0	5	0
Campodarsego (loan)	2022–23	Serie D	4	0	—		—		0	0	4	0
York United	2023	Canadian Premier League	12	0	0	0	0	0	—		12	0
York United	2024	Canadian Premier League	22	1	0	0	1	0	—		23	1
York United	Total		34	1	0	0	1	0	0	0	35	1
Atlético Ottawa	2025	Canadian Premier League	23	1	2	0	4	0	–		29	1
Career total			65	2	2	0	5	0	1	0	73	2

== Honours ==
Atlético Ottawa

- Canadian Premier League: 2025
