= Kevin Ortega =

Kevin Ortega may refer to:

- Kevin Ortega (referee) (born 1992), Peruvian football referee
- Kevin Ortega (footballer) (born 2002), Mexican footballer
