= 2025 Canadian Premier League final =

Soccer match

- Event: 2025 Canadian Premier League season
Atlético Ottawa	Cavalry FC
2	1
- After extra time
- Date: November 9, 2025
- Venue: TD Place Stadium, Ottawa, Ontario
- CPL Finals MVP: David Rodríguez (Atlético Ottawa)
- Referee: Michael Venne
- Attendance: 13,132
- Weather: Snow −1 °C (30 °F); 93% humidity

The 2025 Canadian Premier League final was the seventh edition of the CPL Finals, the post-season championship of the Canadian Premier League, the top level of Canadian soccer, which determined the winner of the 2025 Canadian Premier League season. It was played on November 9, 2025, at TD Place Stadium in Ottawa, Ontario between Atlético Ottawa and Cavalry FC. The hosts, Atlético Ottawa, clinched their first league championship.

Amid snowy conditions that caused the national women's league playoffs to be postponed, the decision was made to proceed with the final. The weather resulted in the match being stopped five times during regulation time to clear away snow, and the start of extra time was delayed by an hour to allow snowplows to clear more of the pitch. Ottawa won 2–1 with two goals from David Rodríguez. The match attracted significant international media coverage both for the wintery weather and for Rodríguez's first goal, a bicycle kick that was widely dubbed the "icicle kick".

== Path to the final ==
The 2025 CPL season was contested by eight teams. Each team played four games against each of the seven opponents for a total of 28 matches. The top-five teams from the regular season qualified for the playoffs, which began on October 22. The playoffs featured a Page playoff format where teams entered in different rounds depending on their finishing position. All matches in the playoffs were played as single legs. The final was contested by the winners of the first and second semifinals.

=== Regular season standings ===
Pos	Team	Pld	W	D	L	GF	GA	GD	Pts	Qualification
1	Forge (S)	28	16	10	2	51	22	+29	58	First semifinal and 2026 CONCACAF Champions Cup
2	Atlético Ottawa (C)	28	15	11	2	54	28	+26	56	First semifinal
3	Cavalry	28	11	9	8	47	36	+11	42	Quarterfinal
4	HFX Wanderers	28	11	6	11	41	34	+7	39	Play-in round
5	York United	28	10	8	10	43	38	+5	38	Play-in round

Source: CanPL
Rules for classification: 1) Points; 2) Total number of wins; 3) Head-to-head; 4) Goal differential; 5) Goals for; 6) Away goals differential; 7) Away goals for; 8) Home goals differential; 9) Home goals for; 10) Fewest disciplinary points; 11) Most under-21 domestic player minutes; 12) Drawing of lots.
(C) Champion (qualified to Champions Cup Round one); (S) CPL Shield winner (qualified to Champions Cup Round one)

=== Playoff bracket ===
Play-in round
October 22 – Halifax
4	HFX Wanderers	2 (4)
5	York United (p)	2 (5)

First semifinal
October 26 – Hamilton
1	Forge	1
2	Atlético Ottawa	2
Quarterfinal
October 26 – Foothills County
3	Cavalry	4
5	York United	1

Second semifinal
November 2 – Hamilton
1	Forge	0
3	Cavalry	1

Final
November 9 – Ottawa
2	Atlético Ottawa (a.e.t.)	2
3	Cavalry	1

== Background ==
=== Atlético Ottawa ===
Atlético Ottawa reached the CPL final for the second time in its six seasons of play. Ottawa lost its previous final in 2022.

=== Cavalry FC ===
Cavalry FC was the defending champion, having won the league for the first time in 2024. It reached the CPL final for the third year in a row and the fourth time in its seven seasons of play.

=== Head-to-head ===
In the 2025 regular season, Ottawa defeated Cavalry three times (3–1 on April 26, 2–0 on June 28, and 3–0 on September 27) and the teams drew once (2–2 on August 23). This was the first time that the teams met in a postseason.

== Venue ==
TD Place Stadium in Ottawa, Ontario, home of Atlético Ottawa, was the host stadium for the final. This was determined by the outcome of the playoffs' first semifinal on October 26 between regular season winner Forge FC and second seed Atlético Ottawa; Atlético Ottawa won the match 2–1.

The match took place in heavy snowfall and subzero temperatures. Play was paused several times to clear snow from the field, resulting in the match taking over three hours to complete including extra time. During regular time only the lines and penalty areas were able to be kept clear, but the snowfall lessened as the match went on and the field was made nearly snow-free for extra time.

== Broadcasting ==
The CPL final was broadcast on OneSoccer and TSN in Canada and Fox Sports 2 in the United States.

== Pre-match ==
Associated with the final, the annual Canadian Premier League Awards took place on November 7 at the Canadian Museum of History in Gatineau, Quebec.

== Match ==
November 9
5:20 pm EST (Note: The match, originally scheduled for 5:00 pm, was delayed 20 minutes due to the need for snow removal.)

Atlético Ottawa	2–1 (a.e.t.)	Cavalry
Rodríguez 40', 107'	Report	Aird 33' (pen.)

TD Place Stadium, Ottawa, Ontario
Attendance: 13,132
Referee: Michael Venne

Atlético Ottawa	Cavalry

GK	29	(Canada) Nathan Ingham (c)
CB	18	(Equatorial Guinea) Roni Mbomio
CB	23	(Canada) Noah Abatneh	(yellow card) 91'
CB	28	(Canada) Loïc Cloutier
RM	19	(Portugal) Kévin Santos
CM	2	(Mexico) Juan Castro		(substituted off) 68'
CM	10	(Canada) Manny Aparicio		(substituted off) 120+2'
LM	11	(Brazil) Gabriel Antinoro	(yellow card) 120+2'	(substituted off) 120+2'
AM	7	(United States) David Rodríguez		(substituted off) 109'
AM	13	(Canada) Ballou Tabla		(substituted off) 86'
CF	9	(Canada) Samuel Salter	(yellow card) 45+8'
Substitutes:
GK	1	(Canada) Tristan Crampton
DF	4	(Canada) Tyr Walker		(substituted on) 120+2'
DF	20	(Canada) Joaquim Coulanges
MF	6	(Mexico) Kevin Ortega		(substituted on) 120+2'
MF	21	(Spain) Alberto Zapater		(substituted on) 109'
MF	33	(Mali) Aboubacar Sissoko	(yellow card) 75'	(substituted on) 68'
FW	12	(New Zealand) Monty Patterson		(substituted on) 86'
Manager: (Mexico) Diego Mejía

GK	1	(Canada) Marco Carducci (c)
RB	33	(Canada) Fraser Aird
CB	4	(Netherlands) Daan Klomp
CB	12	(Republic of Ireland) Tom Field		(substituted off) 90'
LB	19	(Moldova) Mihail Gherasimencov	(yellow card) 50'	(substituted off) 64'
CM	24	(Canada) Eryk Kobza	(yellow card) 116'
CM	26	(Bangladesh) Shamit Shome	(yellow card) 82'	(substituted off) 105'
RW	7	(Somalia) Ali Musse		(substituted off) 79'
AM	9	(Germany) Tobias Warschewski
LW	20	(Benin) Goteh Ntignee	(yellow card) 114'
CF	14	(Saint Lucia) Caniggia Elva		(substituted off) 105'
Substitutes:
GK	21	(Canada) Joseph Holliday
DF	5	(France) Bradley Kamdem		(substituted on) 64'
DF	15	(England) Levi Laing
MF	10	(Canada) Sergio Camargo		(substituted on) 79'
MF	27	(Canada) Diego Gutiérrez		(substituted on) 90'
MF	55	(Philippines) Michael Baldisimo		(substituted on) 105'
FW	25	(Netherlands) Ayman Sellouf		(substituted on) 105'
Manager: (England) Tommy Wheeldon Jr.

CPL Final MVP:
David Rodríguez (Atlético Ottawa)

Assistant referees:
Twayne Anderson
Graham Forsyth
Fourth official:
Ben Hoskins

Match rules

- 90 minutes
- 30 minutes of extra time if necessary
- Penalty shoot-out if score still level
- Maximum of five substitutions, with a sixth allowed in extra time

== Post-match ==
Following the match, Atlético Ottawa was awarded the North Star Cup and qualified for the 2026 CONCACAF Champions Cup, the first time doing so in the club's history. Ottawa's attacking midfielder David Rodríguez was named the Finals Most Valuable Player.

== See also ==
- Canadian Premier League Finals
- 2025 Canadian Championship final
