= Kevin Ortega (footballer) =

Mexican footballer (born 2002)

Personal information
- Full name: Kevin Ariel Ortega Mercado
- Date of birth: 4 January 2002 (age 24)
- Place of birth: Hermosillo, Mexico
- Height: 1.65 m (5 ft 5 in)
- Position: Midfielder

Youth career
- 2015–2021: Pachuca
- 2024: Atlético San Luis

Senior career*
Years	Team	Apps	(Gls)
2020–2021	Pachuca	1	(0)
2021–2023	Raya2 Expansión	17	(0)
2023	Monterrey	2	(0)
2024–2026	Atlético San Luis	4	(0)
2025	→ Atlético Ottawa (loan)	14	(0)

International career^{‡}
2017	Mexico U15	1	(0)
2018–2019	Mexico U17	7	(0)
Medal record
Men's football
Representing Mexico
CONCACAF U-17 Championship
Winner	2019 United States
- * Club domestic league appearances and goals as of 28 October 2025 ‡ National team caps and goals as of 17 May 2019

Kevin Ariel Ortega Mercado (born 4 January 2002) is a Mexican professional footballer who plays for Liga MX club Atlético San Luis.

== Early life ==
In 2015, Ortega joined the Pachuca youth system at the U13 level.

== Club career ==
On 7 November 2020, Ortega made his Liga MX debut for Pachuca starting the match against Necaxa, as Pachuca was missing 14 players due to the COVID-19 illness.

In July 2021, Ortega signed with Monterrey. He would also play with the side's second team Raya2 Expansión in the Liga de Expansión MX.

In January 2024, he joined Atlético San Luis. He also played with the side's U23 team, winning the U-23 Apertura Championship in December 2024. In March 2025, he was loaned to Atlético Ottawa in the Canadian Premier League for the remainder of 2025.

== International career ==
Ortega played with the Mexico U15 and Mexico U17 teams.

== Honours ==
Atlético Ottawa

- Canadian Premier League: 2025
