= 2025 Atlético Ottawa season =

Atlético Ottawa
2025 season
- CEO: Manuel Vega
- Head coach: Diego Mejía
- Stadium: TD Place Stadium
- Canadian Premier League: 2nd
- CPL playoffs: Champions
- Canadian Championship: Semifinals
- Top goalscorer: League: Samuel Salter (20); All: Samuel Salter (24)

The 2025 Atlético Ottawa season was the sixth season in the history of Atlético Ottawa. In addition to the Canadian Premier League, the club competed in the Canadian Championship.

At the end of the 2024 season, head coach Carlos González left the club by mutual agreement. He was replaced by Diego Mejía, who signed a one-year contract, with a club option for 2026.

== Current squad ==
As of September 26, 2025

| No. | Name | Nationality | Position(s) | Date of birth (age) | Previous club | Notes |
Goalkeepers
| 1 | Tristan Crampton | (Canada) | GK | July 10, 2002 (aged 23) | (Canada) OSU Atlético | |
| 29 | Nathan Ingham | (Canada) | GK | January 27, 1993 (aged 32) | (Canada) York United FC | |
Defenders
| 4 | Tyr Walker | (Canada) | CB / FB | October 22, 2003 (aged 22) | (Canada) Acadia University | |
| 17 | Brett Levis | (Canada) | LB | March 29, 1993 (aged 32) | (United States) Detroit City FC | |
| 18 | Roni Mbomio | (Spain) | RB / CB | May 3, 2005 (aged 20) | (Spain) Atlético Madrid C | INT, Loan |
| 20 | Joaquim Coulanges | (Canada) | LB / LW | November 3, 2006 (aged 19) | (Canada) CF Montréal Academy | U21 |
| 23 | Noah Abatneh | (Canada) | RB / CB | September 28, 2004 (aged 21) | (Canada) York United | U21 |
| 28 | Loïc Cloutier | (Canada) | CB | April 26, 2004 (aged 21) | (Canada) OSU Atlético | U21 |
| 55 | Amer Didic | (Canada) | CB | December 28, 1994 (aged 31) | (Canada) Pacific FC | |
| 84 | Sergei Kozlovskiy | (Canada) | LB / CB | June 18, 2008 (aged 17) | (Canada) CF Montréal Academy | U21, EYT |
Midfielders
| 2 | Juan Castro | (Mexico) | CM / DM | December 21, 1991 (aged 34) | (Mexico) Atlético San Luis | INT |
| 6 | Kevin Ortega | (Mexico) | CM | January 4, 2002 (aged 23) | (Mexico) Atlético San Luis | INT, Loan |
| 7 | David Rodríguez | (United States) | AM / RW | May 5, 2002 (aged 23) | (Mexico) Atlético San Luis | INT, Loan |
| 8 | Noah Verhoeven | (Canada) | CM | June 15, 1999 (aged 26) | (Canada) Valour FC | |
| 10 | Manny Aparicio | (Canada) | CM | September 17, 1995 (aged 30) | (Canada) Pacific FC | |
| 11 | Gabriel Antinoro | (Brazil) | LW | April 24, 2004 (aged 21) | (Canada) CF Montréal | U21 |
| 14 | Jean-Aniel Assi | (Canada) | LW / RW | August 12, 2004 (aged 21) | (Spain) Alcorcón B | U21 |
| 16 | Jason Hartill | (Canada) | MF | January 16, 2004 (aged 21) | (Canada) Cape Breton University | U21, U-S |
| 21 | Alberto Zapater | (Spain) | DM | June 13, 1985 (aged 40) | (Spain) Real Zaragoza | INT |
| 24 | Antonio Álvarez | (Mexico) | AM | December 26, 2003 (aged 22) | (Mexico) Club América | INT |
| 33 | Aboubacar Sissoko | (Mali) | CM | October 9, 1995 (aged 30) | (Canada) Forge FC | |
Forwards
| 9 | Samuel Salter | (Canada) | CF | August 9, 2000 (aged 25) | (Canada) HFX Wanderers | |
| 12 | Monty Patterson | (New Zealand) | ST / RW / LW | December 9, 1996 (aged 29) | (New Zealand) Birkenhead United | INT |
| 13 | Ballou Tabla | (Canada) | CF / RW / LW | March 31, 1999 (aged 26) | (Turkey) Manisa FK | |
| 19 | Kevin dos Santos | (Portugal) | LW / RW | November 20, 1999 (aged 26) | (Canada) York United | |
| 30 | Ralph Khoury | (Lebanon) | CF | May 9, 2007 (aged 18) | (Canada) Ottawa South United | U21, LDC |
| 77 | Richie Ennin | (Canada) | CF / RW / LW | September 17, 1998 (aged 27) | (Hungary) MTK Budapest FC | |

== Transfers ==
=== In ===
==== Transferred in ====
| No. | Pos. | Player | From club | Fee/notes | Date | Source |
|---|---|---|---|---|---|---|
| 11 | MF | (Canada) Noah Verhoeven | (Canada) Valour FC | Loan return | January 1, 2025 | |
| | MF | (Mexico) Juan Castro | (Mexico) Atlético San Luis | Free | January 17, 2025 | |
| | DF | (Canada) Noah Abatneh | (Canada) York United | Free | January 27, 2025 | |
| | DF | (Canada) Loïc Cloutier | (Canada) OSU Atlético | Free | February 3, 2025 | |
| | DF | (Canada) Brett Levis | (United States) Detroit City FC | Free | February 20, 2025 | |
| | FW | (New Zealand) Monty Patterson | (New Zealand) Birkenhead United | Free | February 26, 2025 | |
| | GK | (Canada) Tristan Crampton | (Canada) OSU Atlético | Free | March 13, 2025 | |
| | DF | (Canada) Joaquim Coulanges | (Canada) CF Montréal Academy | Free | March 14, 2025 | |
| | DF | (Canada) Sergei Kozlovskiy | (Canada) CF Montréal Academy | Free | March 26, 2025 | |
| | MF | (Canada) Jason Hartill | (Canada) CBU Capers | Selected 6th in the 2025 CPL–U Sports Draft, U-Sports contract | April 4, 2025 | |
| | FW | (Lebanon) Ralph Khoury | (Canada) Ottawa South United | Development contract | April 6, 2025 | |
| | MF | (Canada) Jean-Aniel Assi | (Spain) Alcorcón B | Free | September 5, 2025 | |
| | FW | (Canada) Richie Ennin | (Hungary) MTK Budapest FC | Free | September 26, 2025 | |

==== Loans in ====
| No. | Pos. | Player | From club | Fee/notes | Date | Source |
|---|---|---|---|---|---|---|
| | MF | (United States) David Rodríguez | (Mexico) Atlético San Luis | | February 5, 2025 | |
| | DF | (Mexico) Iker Moreno | (Mexico) Atlético San Luis | Returned from loan on July 8, 2025 | March 19, 2025 | |
| | MF | (Mexico) Kevin Ortega | (Mexico) Atlético San Luis | | March 19, 2025 | |
| | MF | (Mexico) Antonio Álvarez | (Mexico) Club América | | August 1, 2025 | |
| | DF | (Spain) Roni Mbomio | (Spain) Atlético Madrid | | August 28, 2025 | |

==== Draft picks ====
Atlético Ottawa selected the following players in the 2025 CPL–U Sports Draft. Draft picks are not automatically signed to the team roster. Only those who are signed to a contract will be listed as transfers in.

| Round | Selection | Pos. | Player | Nationality | University |
|---|---|---|---|---|---|
| 1 | 6 | MF | Jason Hartill | Canada | Cape Breton |
| 2 | 14 | DF | Adam N’Goran | Canada | Carleton |

=== Out ===
==== Transferred out ====
| No. | Pos. | Player | To club | Fee/notes | Date | Source |
|---|---|---|---|---|---|---|
| 15 | DF | (Canada) Maxim Tissot | Retired | | October 20, 2024 | |
| 10 | MF | (Northern Ireland) Ollie Bassett | (United States) Tampa Bay Rowdies | Contract expired | December 31, 2024 | |
| 3 | DF | (Spain) Jesús del Amo | (Spain) Avilés Industrial | Contract expired | December 31, 2024 | |
| 19 | FW | (Switzerland) Rubén Del Campo | (Spain) UCAM Murcia | Contract expired | December 31, 2024 | |
| 5 | DF | (Trinidad and Tobago) Luke Singh | (Canada) Toronto FC | Loan expired | December 31, 2024 | |
| 6 | DF | (Ecuador) Liberman Torres | (Spain) Villarreal CF B | Loan expired | December 31, 2024 | |
| 8 | DF | (Spain) Dani Morer | (Portugal) F.C. Famalicão | Loan expired | December 31, 2024 | |
| 96 | MF | (Greece) Ilias Iliadis | (Canada) CF Montréal | Loan expired | December 31, 2024 | |
| 99 | GK | (Algeria) Rayane Yesli | (Canada) HFX Wanderers | Option declined | December 31, 2024 | |
| 2 | DF | (Canada) Zachary Roy | | Option declined | December 31, 2024 | |
| 22 | DF | (Canada) Matteo de Brienne | (Sweden) GAIS | Undisclosed fee | January 6, 2025 | |
| 23 | MF | (Canada) Kris Twardek | (Canada) Valour FC | Undisclosed fee | January 10, 2025 | |
| 3 | DF | (Guyana) Jonathan Grant | | Contract terminated by mutual consent | August 15, 2025 | |

== Competitions ==
=== Canadian Premier League ===
==== Table ====
| Pos | Team | Pld | W | D | L | GF | GA | GD | Pts | Qualification |
|---|---|---|---|---|---|---|---|---|---|---|
| 1 | Forge (S) | 28 | 16 | 10 | 2 | 51 | 22 | +29 | 58 | First semifinal and 2026 CONCACAF Champions Cup |
| 2 | Atlético Ottawa (C) | 28 | 15 | 11 | 2 | 54 | 28 | +26 | 56 | First semifinal |
| 3 | Cavalry | 28 | 11 | 9 | 8 | 47 | 36 | +11 | 42 | Quarterfinal |
| 4 | HFX Wanderers | 28 | 11 | 6 | 11 | 41 | 34 | +7 | 39 | Play-in round |
| 5 | York United | 28 | 10 | 8 | 10 | 43 | 38 | +5 | 38 | Play-in round |
| 6 | Valour | 28 | 7 | 5 | 16 | 35 | 62 | −27 | 26 | |
| 7 | Pacific | 28 | 5 | 8 | 15 | 30 | 59 | −29 | 23 | |
| 8 | Vancouver | 28 | 4 | 9 | 15 | 35 | 57 | −22 | 21 | 2026 CONCACAF Champions Cup (Note: Vancouver FC qualified for the Champions Cup as the runners-up of the 2025 Canadian Championship, due to the winners, Vancouver Whitecaps FC, qualifying through Major League Soccer.) |

Source: CanPL
Rules for classification: 1) Points; 2) Total number of wins; 3) Head-to-head; 4) Goal differential; 5) Goals for; 6) Away goals differential; 7) Away goals for; 8) Home goals differential; 9) Home goals for; 10) Fewest disciplinary points; 11) Most under-21 domestic player minutes; 12) Drawing of lots.
(C) Champion (qualified to Champions Cup Round one); (S) CPL Shield winner (qualified to Champions Cup Round one)

==== Results summary ====
| Match | 1 | 2 | 3 | 4 | 5 | 6 | 7 | 8 | 9 | 10 | 11 | 12 | 13 | 14 | 15 | 16 | 17 | 18 | 19 | 20 | 21 | 22 | 23 | 24 | 25 | 26 | 27 | 28 |
|---|---|---|---|---|---|---|---|---|---|---|---|---|---|---|---|---|---|---|---|---|---|---|---|---|---|---|---|---|
| Result | D | W | W | W | W | W | D | L | D | W | W | D | W | D | W | W | D | W | L | D | W | W | D | D | W | D | D | W |
| Position | 4 | 2 | 1 | 1 | 1 | 1 | 1 | 2 | 1 | 1 | 1 | 1 | 1 | 1 | 1 | 1 | 2 | 2 | 2 | 2 | 2 | 2 | 2 | 2 | 2 | 2 | 2 | 2 |

Source: Matches
W = Win; D = Draw; L = Loss

==== Matches ====
| April 5 1 | Atlético Ottawa | 2–2 | HFX Wanderers | Ottawa, Ontario |
| 2:00pm ET | Walker (yellow card) 42' (yellow-red card) 86'; Rodríguez 60'; Sissoko 79' | Report | Probo 20'; Rea 47'; Callegari (yellow card) 90+7' | Stadium: TD Place Stadium; Attendance: 5,286; Referee: Mathieu Souaré |

| April 13 2 | Vancouver FC | 1–4 | Atlético Ottawa | Langley, British Columbia |
| 6:00pm ET | Campbell 66'; Díaz (yellow card) 90+1' | Report | Rodríguez 20'; dos Santos 37'; Tabla 42'; Castro (yellow card) 45+1'; Didic (yellow card) 54'; Patterson 83' | Stadium: Willoughby Community Park; Referee: Scott Bowman |

| April 19 3 | Atlético Ottawa | 3–2 | York United | Ottawa, Ontario |
| 1:00pm ET | Abatneh (yellow card) 31' (goal) 90+5'; Rodríguez (yellow card) 43'; Salter 51'; Aparicio 56' (yellow card) 72' | Report | León (yellow card) 2'; Altobelli 11'; Bitar (yellow card) 21'; Singh (yellow card) 53'; Adekugbe (yellow card) 59'; Jimoh (yellow card) 66'; Kibato (yellow card) 68'; Ferrazzo 83' (yellow card) 90+5' | Stadium: TD Place Stadium; Referee: Mario Al-Ayass |

| April 26 4 | Cavalry FC | 1–3 | Atlético Ottawa | Foothills County, Alberta |
| 5:00pm ET | Field (yellow card) 22'; Kamdem Fewo (red card) 64'; Henry (yellow card) 68'; Elva 87'; Laing (yellow card) 89' | Report | Kamdem Fewo 48' (o.g.); Kozlovskiy (yellow card) 63'; Tabla 66'; Castro (yellow card) 80'; Coulanges 82' | Stadium: ATCO Field; Referee: Carly Shaw-Maclaren |

| May 3 5 | Atlético Ottawa | 3–1 | Pacific FC | Ottawa, Ontario |
| 1:00pm ET | Didić (yellow card) 28'; dos Santos 55'; Castro (yellow card) 63'; Antinoro 64'; Rodríguez 69' | Report | Kratt 37'; Quintana (yellow card) 67' | Stadium: TD Place Stadium; Referee: Ben Hoskins |

| May 10 6 | Atlético Ottawa | 5–2 | Valour FC | Ottawa, Ontario |
| 2:00pm ET | Castro (yellow card) 26'; Salter 28', 42', 46', 58'; Rodríguez 45+3' | Report | Hundal 5'; Antonoglou (yellow card) 22'; Egwu 49'; Venâncio (yellow card) 86'; Williams (yellow card) 90' | Stadium: TD Place Stadium; Attendance: 4,476; Referee: Scott Bowman |

| May 13 7 | Forge FC | 2–2 | Atlético Ottawa | Hamilton, Ontario |
| 11:00am ET | Wright (yellow card) 34'; Ampomah 38' (yellow card) 76'; Koné 75' | Report | dos Santos 37'; Abatneh (yellow card) 50'; Salter 58' (yellow card) 58'; Rodríguez (yellow card) 80' (yellow-red card) 80' | Stadium: Hamilton Stadium; Attendance: 17,971; Referee: Yusri Rudolf |

| May 24 8 | HFX Wanderers | 2–0 | Atlético Ottawa | Halifax, Nova Scotia |
| 3:00pm ET | Bahamboula (yellow card) 6'; Meilleur-Giguère 75'; Coimbra 79' (pen.) (yellow card) 82'; Rushenas (yellow card) 81'; Biello (yellow card) 90+1' | Report | dos Santos (yellow card) 25'; Abatneh (yellow card) 65' | Stadium: Wanderers Grounds; Referee: Michael Venne |

| May 30 9 | Vancouver FC | 2–2 | Atlético Ottawa | Langley, British Columbia |
| 10:00pm ET | Cloutier 13' (o.g.); Díaz (yellow card) 28'; Bah (yellow card) 35'; Fotsing 45'; Fry (yellow card) 48'; Mezquida (yellow card) 84' | Report | Salter 55'; Rodríguez 64'; Duhaney-Walker (yellow card) 90+2' | Stadium: Willoughby Community Park; Referee: Scott Bowman |

| June 7 10 | Pacific FC | 0–1 | Atlético Ottawa | Langford, British Columbia |
| 6:00pm ET | Young (yellow card) 45'; Browning-Lagerfeldt (yellow card) 68'; Schiavoni (yellow card) 89' | Report | Duhaney-Walker (yellow card) 39'; Tabla 44' (pen.); Castro (yellow card) 47'; Salter (yellow card) 52'; Rodríguez (yellow card) 65' | Stadium: Starlight Stadium; Referee: Fabrizio Stassola |

| June 15 11 | Atlético Ottawa | 3–0 | Valour FC | Ottawa, Ontario |
| 7:00pm ET | Tabla 45+4' (pen.); Salter 51'; Cloutier (yellow card) 57'; Antinoro 73' | Report | Fernandez (yellow card) 75'; Faria (yellow card) 90+2' | Stadium: TD Place Stadium; Attendance: 4,117; Referee: Roberto D'Alessio |

| June 22 12 | York United | 0–0 | Atlético Ottawa | Toronto, Ontario |
| 1:00pm ET | | Report | Kozlovskiy (yellow card) 9' | Stadium: York Lions Stadium; Referee: Yusri Rudolf |

| June 28 13 | Cavalry FC | 0–2 | Atlético Ottawa | Foothills County, Alberta |
| 6:00pm ET | Laing (yellow card) 13'; Montgomery (yellow card) 38'; Gutiérrez (yellow card) 68' | Report | dos Santos 9'; Salter 61'; Tabla (yellow card) 87' | Stadium: ATCO Field; Referee: Renzo Villanueva |

| July 12 14 | Atlético Ottawa | 1–1 | Forge FC | Ottawa, Ontario |
| 3:00pm ET | Tabla 90+3' (pen.) | Report | Bekker 9'; Koleilat (yellow card) 70' | Stadium: TD Place Stadium; Attendance: 6,087; Referee: Fabrizio Stasolla |

| July 18 15 | Atlético Ottawa | 2–0 | HFX Wanderers | Ottawa, Ontario |
| 7:00pm ET | Salter 10'; Tabla 47' (pen.) | Report | Coimbra (yellow card) 65'; Timoteo (yellow card) 73' | Stadium: TD Place Stadium; Attendance: 5,119; Referee: Michael Venne |

| July 26 16 | Pacific FC | 0–2 | Atlético Ottawa | Langford, British Columbia |
| 8:00pm ET | | Report | Tabla (yellow card) 33'; Salter 62'; Rodríguez 72' | Stadium: Starlight Stadium |

| August 3 17 | Atlético Ottawa | 0–0 | York United | Ottawa, Ontario |
| 4:00pm ET | Aparicio (yellow card) 16'; Castro (yellow card) 26'; Ingham (yellow card) 72' | Report | Reid (yellow card) 41'; Ferrin (yellow card) 62'; León (yellow card) 72' | Stadium: TD Place Stadium; Attendance: 5,175; Referee: Ben Hoskins |

| August 10 18 | Valour FC | 1–2 | Atlético Ottawa | Winnipeg, Manitoba |
| 3:00pm ET | Romeo (yellow card) 26'; Ohin (yellow card) 45+2'; Antonoglou 86' | Report | Rodríguez 32'; Tabla (yellow card) 39'; Coulanges (yellow card) 45+1'; Salter 64' | Stadium: Princess Auto Stadium |

| August 17 19 | Forge FC | 2–0 | Atlético Ottawa | Hamilton, Ontario |
| 6:00pm ET | Bekker 24'; Nimick (yellow card) 45'; Wright 55'; Hojabrpour (yellow card) 82'; Koné (yellow card) 90+5' | Report | Aparicio (yellow card) 36'; Castro (yellow card) 49'; Salter (yellow card) 84'; Kozlovskiy (yellow card) 90+4' | Stadium: Hamilton Stadium; Referee: Michael Venne |

| August 23 20 | Atlético Ottawa | 2–2 | Cavalry FC | Ottawa, Ontario |
| 7:00pm ET | Tabla (yellow card) 56'; Salter 69'; Rodríguez 72'; Kozlovskiy (yellow card) 90+3' | Report | Musse 23', 35'; Camargo (yellow card) 29'; Klomp (yellow card) 49'; Montgomery (yellow card) 76'; Kamdem Fewo (yellow card) 84'; Aird (yellow card) 90+5' | Stadium: TD Place Stadium; Attendance: 5,248; Referee: Yusri Rudolf |

| August 30 21 | Atlético Ottawa | 3–1 | Vancouver FC | Ottawa, Ontario |
| 1:00pm ET | Rodríguez 30'; Salter 40', 80'; Sissoko (yellow card) 90+3' | Report | Mezquida 25'; Campagna (yellow card) 38'; Pathé (yellow card) 85' | Stadium: TD Place Stadium; Attendance: 4,540; Referee: Carly Shaw-Maclaren |

| September 6 22 | Atlético Ottawa | 2–0 | Pacific FC | Ottawa, Ontario |
| 7:00pm ET | Aparicio (yellow card) 55'; Tabla 76'; Coulanges 81'; Assi (yellow card) 90+1' | Report | Chung (yellow card) 43'; Juhmi (yellow card) 55'; Schiavoni (yellow card) 73'; Toualy (yellow card) 83'; Ndom (yellow card) 88' | Stadium: TD Place Stadium |

| September 14 23 | York United | 2–2 | Atlético Ottawa | Toronto, Ontario |
| 2:00pm ET | Yeates 10'; Hundal (yellow card) 12'; Sturing 54'; Botello (yellow card) 62' | Report | Salter 8', 49'; Levis (yellow card) 38'; Assi (yellow card) 90+2' | Stadium: York Lions Stadium; Referee: Sebastian Noshinravani |

| September 21 24 | Atlético Ottawa | 1–1 | Forge FC | Ottawa, Ontario |
| 3:00pm ET | Antinoro 25'; Aparicio (yellow card) 61'; Ortega (yellow card) 87' | Report | Rama (yellow card) 52'; Massunda 82' | Stadium: TD Place Stadium; Attendance: 5,348; Referee: Scott Bowman |

| September 27 25 | Atlético Ottawa | 3–0 | Cavalry FC | Ottawa, Ontario |
| 1:00pm ET | Salter 18'; Kozlovskiy (yellow card) 55'; Tabla 72', 80'; Ortega (yellow card) 78' | Report | Musse (yellow card) 28'; Aird (yellow card) 45+2'; Kobza (yellow card) 55'; Myroniuk (yellow card) 86'; Warschewski (yellow card) 88' | Stadium: TD Place Stadium; Attendance: 4,632; Referee: Ben Hoskins |

| October 5 26 | Valour FC | 3–3 | Atlético Ottawa | Winnipeg, Manitoba |
| 3:00pm ET | Twardek 2'; Antonoglou (yellow card) 41' (goal) 71'; Ressurreição (yellow card) 42'; Konincks (yellow card) 60'; Facchineri (yellow card) 89'; Pop 90+3' | Report | Tabla 41', 88'; Salter 56'; Cloutier (yellow card) 90' | Stadium: Princess Auto Stadium; Referee: Renzo Villanueva |

| October 12 27 | Atlético Ottawa | 0–0 | Vancouver FC | Ottawa, Ontario |
| 3:00pm ET | Abatneh (yellow card) 90+3' | Report | Fry (yellow card) 35'; Ouattara (yellow card) 39'; Michel (yellow card) 72'; Campagna (yellow card) 88'; Mezquida (yellow card) 90+5'; Dada-Luke (yellow card) 90+5' | Stadium: TD Place Stadium; Attendance: 4,545; Referee: Michael Venne |

| October 18 28 | HFX Wanderers | 0–1 | Atlético Ottawa | Halifax, Nova Scotia |
| 4:00pm ET | Baï (yellow card) 40'; Johnston (yellow card) 60' | Report | Ennin 89'; Aparicio (yellow card) 90+4' | Stadium: Wanderers Grounds; Referee: Fabrizio Stasolla |

==== Playoff matches ====
| October 26 SF | Forge FC | 1–2 | Atlético Ottawa | Hamilton, Ontario |
| 2:00pm ET | Choinière 23'; Ampomah (yellow card) 52'; Koleilat (yellow card) 90+10' | Report | Salter (yellow card) 32' (goal) 58'; Antinoro 33'; Zapater (yellow card) 90+10' | Stadium: Hamilton Stadium; Referee: Carly Shaw-Maclaren |

| November 9 Final | Atletico Ottawa | 2–1 (a.e.t.) | Cavalry FC | Ottawa, Ontario |
| 5:00pm ET | D. Rodriguez 40' 107' | Report | Fraser Aird 33' | Stadium: TD Place |

=== Canadian Championship ===
| April 29 1 | Atlético Ottawa | 2–0 | Scrosoppi FC | Ottawa, Ontario |
| 7:00 PM EDT | dos Santos 12'; Kozlovskiy (yellow card) 35'; Cloutier (yellow card) 54'; Salter 86' | | Nyumah (yellow card) 43'; Gill (yellow card) 54' | Stadium: TD Place Stadium; Attendance: 2,229; Referee: Sebastian Noshinravani |

| June 11 QF | Atlético Ottawa | 2–1 | York United | Ottawa, Ontario |
| 7:00 PM EDT | Tabla 16'; Rodríguez 18'; Abatneh (yellow card) 45+2'; Aparicio (yellow card) 73'; Coulanges (yellow card) 90+2'; Cloutier (yellow card) 90+5' | | Altobelli 5' (yellow card) 30'; Kibato (yellow card) 52'; Ferrazzo (yellow card) 74' | Stadium: TD Place Stadium; Attendance: 2,084; Referee: Mario Al-Ayass |

| July 8 QF | York United | 3–4 | Atlético Ottawa | Toronto, Ontario |
| 7:00 PM EDT | Altobelli 13', 37'; Adekugbe (red card) 26'; Ferrazzo (yellow card) 45+1'; Ferrin 53'; Pavela (yellow card) 65'; Kibato (yellow card) 66' | | Rodríguez 20'; Salter 22', 84'; Tabla (yellow card) 31'; Antinoro (yellow card) 70'; Sissoko 90+2' (yellow card) 90+3' | Stadium: York Lions Stadium; Referee: Sebastian Noshinravani |

| August 13 SF | Vancouver FC | 3–1 | Atlético Ottawa | Langley, British Columbia |
| 10:00pm ET | Michel 21'; Mbongue 69'; Mezquida 90+1' | | Salter 58' | Stadium: Willoughby Community Park |

| September 18 SF | Atlético Ottawa | 1–0 | Vancouver FC | Ottawa, Ontario |
| 7:00pm ET | Coulanges (yellow card) 24'; Rodríguez 44' (yellow card) 90+2' | Report | Michel (yellow card) 29'; Bah (yellow card) 77'; Gee (yellow card) 90+2' | Stadium: TD Place Stadium; Attendance: 2,860; Referee: Filip Dujic |

== Statistics ==
=== Squad and statistics ===
As of October 26, 2025

| No. | Pos | Nat | Player | Total | | Canadian Premier League | | Canadian Championship | |
| No. | Pos | Nat | Player | Apps | Goals | Apps | Goals | Apps | Goals |
|---|---|---|---|---|---|---|---|---|---|
| 1 | GK | (Canada) CAN | Tristan Crampton | 0 | 0 | 0+0 | 0 | 0+0 | 0 |
| 2 | MF | (Mexico) MEX | Juan Castro | 30 | 0 | 26+0 | 0 | 3+1 | 0 |
| 3 | DF | (Guyana) GUY | Jonathan Grant | 0 | 0 | 0+0 | 0 | 0+0 | 0 |
| 4 | DF | (Canada) CAN | Tyr Walker | 18 | 0 | 5+10 | 0 | 3+0 | 0 |
| 5 | DF | (Mexico) MEX | Iker Moreno | 2 | 0 | 1+1 | 0 | 0+0 | 0 |
| 6 | MF | (Mexico) MEX | Kevin Ortega | 15 | 0 | 0+12 | 0 | 1+2 | 0 |
| 7 | MF | (United States) USA | David Rodríguez | 33 | 12 | 28+0 | 9 | 4+1 | 3 |
| 8 | MF | (Canada) CAN | Noah Verhoeven | 6 | 0 | 1+4 | 0 | 1+0 | 0 |
| 9 | FW | (Canada) CAN | Samuel Salter | 34 | 23 | 29+0 | 19 | 4+1 | 4 |
| 10 | MF | (Canada) CAN | Manny Aparicio | 34 | 1 | 28+1 | 1 | 3+2 | 0 |
| 11 | MF | (Brazil) BRA | Gabriel Antinoro | 34 | 3 | 27+2 | 3 | 4+1 | 0 |
| 12 | FW | (New Zealand) NZL | Monty Patterson | 20 | 1 | 0+15 | 1 | 1+4 | 0 |
| 13 | FW | (Canada) CAN | Ballou Tabla | 34 | 12 | 28+1 | 11 | 5+0 | 1 |
| 14 | MF | (Canada) CAN | Jean-Aniel Assi | 5 | 0 | 0+5 | 0 | 0+0 | 0 |
| 17 | DF | (Canada) CAN | Brett Levis | 11 | 0 | 7+3 | 0 | 0+1 | 0 |
| 18 | DF | (Spain) ESP | Roni Mbomio | 8 | 0 | 6+1 | 0 | 1+0 | 0 |
| 19 | FW | (Portugal) POR | Kevin Dos Santos | 33 | 5 | 22+6 | 4 | 4+1 | 1 |
| 20 | DF | (Canada) CAN | Joaquim Coulanges | 22 | 2 | 6+13 | 2 | 2+1 | 0 |
| 21 | MF | (Spain) ESP | Alberto Zapater | 30 | 0 | 4+21 | 0 | 2+3 | 0 |
| 23 | DF | (Canada) CAN | Noah Abatneh | 28 | 1 | 23+1 | 1 | 4+0 | 0 |
| 24 | MF | (Mexico) MEX | Antonio Álvarez | 4 | 0 | 0+3 | 0 | 0+1 | 0 |
| 28 | DF | (Canada) CAN | Loïc Cloutier | 31 | 0 | 25+1 | 0 | 5+0 | 0 |
| 29 | GK | (Canada) CAN | Nathan Ingham | 34 | 0 | 29+0 | 0 | 5+0 | 0 |
| 30 | FW | (Lebanon) LBN | Ralph Khoury | 5 | 0 | 0+5 | 0 | 0+0 | 0 |
| 33 | MF | (Mali) MLI | Aboubacar Sissoko | 26 | 2 | 2+21 | 1 | 1+2 | 1 |
| 55 | DF | (Canada) CAN | Amer Didic | 5 | 0 | 4+0 | 0 | 0+1 | 0 |
| 77 | FW | (Canada) CAN | Richie Ennin | 2 | 1 | 1+1 | 1 | 0+0 | 0 |
| 84 | DF | (Canada) CAN | Sergei Kozlovskiy | 25 | 0 | 18+3 | 0 | 3+1 | 0 |

=== Top scorers ===
| Rank | Nat. | Player | Pos. | Canadian Premier League | Canadian Championship | Total |
|---|---|---|---|---|---|---|
| 1 | (Canada) | Samuel Salter | FW | 20 | 4 | 24 |
| 2 | (Mexico) | David Rodríguez | FW | 11 | 3 | 14 |
| 3 | (Canada) | Ballou Tabla | FW | 11 | 1 | 12 |
| 4 | (Portugal) | Kevin Dos Santos | FW | 4 | 1 | 5 |
| 5 | (Brazil) | Gabriel Antinoro | MF | 4 | 0 | 4 |
| 6 | (Mali) | Aboubacar Sissoko | MF | 1 | 1 | 2 |
| 6 | (Canada) | Joaquim Coulanges | DF | 2 | 0 | 2 |
| 8 | (New Zealand) | Monty Patterson | FW | 1 | 0 | 1 |
| 8 | (Canada) | Manuel Aparicio | MF | 1 | 0 | 1 |
| 8 | (Canada) | Noah Abatneh | DF | 1 | 0 | 1 |
| 8 | (Canada) | Richie Ennin | FW | 1 | 0 | 1 |
| Totals | | | | 56 | 10 | 66 |

Updated to match played October 26, 2025
Source: Premier League

=== Top assists ===
| Rank | Nat. | Player | Pos. | Canadian Premier League | Canadian Championship | Total |
|---|---|---|---|---|---|---|
| 1 | (United States) | David Rodríguez | MF | 9 | 2 | 11 |
| 2 | (Canada) | Manny Aparicio | MF | 6 | 0 | 6 |
| 3 | (Canada) | Samuel Salter | FW | 4 | 1 | 5 |
| 3 | (Canada) | Ballou Tabla | FW | 4 | 1 | 5 |
| 5 | (Mexico) | Juan Castro | MF | 4 | 0 | 4 |
| 5 | (Brazil) | Gabriel Antinoro | MF | 3 | 1 | 4 |
| 7 | (Portugal) | Kevin Dos Santos | FW | 2 | 1 | 3 |
| 8 | (Canada) | Loïc Cloutier | DF | 2 | 0 | 2 |
| 9 | (New Zealand) | Monty Patterson | FW | 1 | 0 | 1 |
| 9 | (Mexico) | Kevin Ortega | MF | 0 | 1 | 1 |
| 9 | (Spain) | Alberto Zapater | MF | 1 | 0 | 1 |
| 9 | (Canada) | Tyr Duhaney-Walker | DF | 1 | 0 | 1 |
| Totals | | | | 37 | 7 | 44 |

Updated to match played October 26, 2025
Source: Premier League

=== Clean sheets ===
| Rank | Nat. | Player | Canadian Premier League | Canadian Championship | TOTAL |
|---|---|---|---|---|---|
| 1 | (Canada) | Nathan Ingham | 11 | 2 | 13 |
| Totals | | | 11 | 2 | 13 |

Updated to match played October 19, 2025
Source: Premier League
