= Tristan Crampton =

Canadian soccer player (born 2002)

Personal information
- Full name: Tristan Crampton
- Date of birth: July 10, 2002 (age 24)
- Place of birth: Cantley, Quebec, Canada
- Height: 1.88 m (6 ft 2 in)
- Position: Goalkeeper

Team information
- Current team: Atlético Ottawa
- Number: 1

Youth career
- AS Gatineau
- FC Gatineau
- Ottawa South United

College career
Years	Team	Apps	(Gls)
2022–2024	UQTR Patriotes	19	(0)

Senior career*
Years	Team	Apps	(Gls)
2023	Ottawa South United	8	(0)
2025–	Atlético Ottawa	7	(0)
- * Club domestic league appearances and goals as of October 18, 2026

Tristan Crampton (born July 10, 2002) is a Canadian soccer player who plays as a goalkeeper for Atlético Ottawa of the Canadian Premier League.

== Early life ==
Crampton played at the youth level with Ottawa South United, AS Gatineau, and FC Gatineau. In 2024, Crampton won the Golden Glove Award as best goalkeeper playing with the Ottawa South United Reserves, and also won the 2024 Ligue1 Québec Reserve Division championship.

Crampton also spent three years at the U Sports college level, playing with the UQTR Patriotes in the Réseau du sport étudiant du Québec from 2022 to 2024.

== Club career ==
In March 2025, Atlético Ottawa announced the signing of Crampton to his first professional contract through the 2025 season, with a club option for 2026. In January 2026, Crampton re-signed with Atlético Ottawa for 2026 season, with a club option for 2027. On April 4, 2026, Crampton made his professional debut after being named in the starting lineup in Atlético Ottawa's first game of the 2026 Canadian Premier League season, a 2-0 loss to Forge FC.

== Career statistics ==
As of match played April 12, 2026

Club	Season	League			Playoffs		Domestic Cup		Total	
Club	Season	Division	Apps	Goals	Apps	Goals	Apps	Goals	Apps	Goals
Atlético Ottawa	2026	Canadian Premier League	2	0	0	0	0	0	2	0
Career total			2	0	0	0	0	0	2	0

== Honours ==
Atlético Ottawa

- Canadian Premier League: 2025
