= David Rodríguez (soccer, born 2002) =

Mexican soccer player (born 2002)

Personal information
- Full name: David Rodríguez Uribe
- Date of birth: May 5, 2002 (age 24)
- Place of birth: San Luis Potosí, Mexico
- Height: 1.78 m (5 ft 10 in)
- Position: Attacking midfielder

Team information
- Current team: Atlético San Luis
- Number: 11

Youth career
- 2017–2019: FC Dallas

Senior career*
Years	Team	Apps	(Gls)
2019–2021	North Texas SC	29	(2)
2021	→ Atlético San Luis (loan)	4	(0)
2021–	Atlético San Luis	36	(4)
2022	→ Phoenix Rising (loan)	0	(0)
2023	→ Austin FC II (loan)	19	(5)
2023	→ Austin FC (loan)	0	(0)
2025	→ Atlético Ottawa (loan)	29	(11)

International career^{‡}
2018	United States U17	2	(0)
- * Club domestic league appearances and goals as of 20 November 2026 ‡ National team caps and goals as of 14 June 2026

David Rodríguez Uribe (born May 5, 2002) is a professional soccer player who plays as an attacking midfielder for Liga MX club Atlético San Luis. Born in Mexico, he has represented the United States at a youth level.

== Club career ==
=== North Texas SC ===
In February 2019 Rodríguez was signed by North Texas SC after having success with the FC Dallas Academy. Rodríguez was a member of the 2019 North Texas SC team that won the 2019 USL League One Championship.

At the beginning of the 2021 season North Texas SC announced that Rodríguez would be loaned to Atletico San Luis on a six-month loan. After making four appearances in Liga MX for Atlético San Luis, North Texas came to an agreement to sell Rodríguez, making him the first player sold by North Texas SC.

=== Atlético San Luis ===
Rodríguez made five more appearances for Atlético San Luis between the 2021 and 2022 Liga MX seasons.

In August 2022, Rodríguez was loaned to Phoenix Rising FC for the end of the 2022 season.

Going into the 2023 Austin FC II announced that Rodríguez was being loaned from Atlético San Luis on a season long loan. Rodríguez was the starting right wing for Austin FC II when they won the 2023 MLS Next Pro Cup, beating the Columbus Crew 2 by a score of 3–1. In May 2023, Austin FC announced they had signed on a short-term agreement, allowing him to be with the first team for four games. Rodríguez was the first player from the second team to make the first team bench, but did not appear in any games.

=== Atlético Ottawa ===
On February 5, 2025, Rodríguez joined sister club Atlético Ottawa on loan for the 2025 season. He made his debut and scored his first on April 5 in a 2–2 draw against the HFX Wanderers. In the 2025 Canadian Premier League final on November 9, which took place amid a snowstorm, Rodríguez scored both goals for Ottawa in their 2–1 extra time victory over Cavalry FC, and was named the player of the match. His first goal in the championship game, a bicycle kick, received extensive international media coverage and was dubbed the "icicle kick."

== International career ==
On 16 October 2018, Rodríguez appeared in an under-17 friendly match for the United States against Russia.

== Personal life ==
David's older brother Arturo is also a professional footballer.

== Career statistics ==
As of match played on 20 November 2026

Club	Season	League			National Cup		Continental		Other		Total	
Club	Season	Division	Apps	Goals	Apps	Goals	Apps	Goals	Apps	Goals	Apps	Goals
North Texas SC	2019	USL League One	18	2	—		—		—		18	2
North Texas SC	2020	USL League One	11	0	—		—		—		11	0
North Texas SC	Total		29	2	—		—		—		29	2
Atlético San Luis (loan)	2020–21	Liga MX	4	0	—		—		—		4	0
Atlético San Luis	2021–22	Liga MX	5	0	—		—		—		5	0
Atlético San Luis	2023–24	Liga MX	5	0	—		—		—		5	0
Atlético San Luis	2024–25	Liga MX	2	0	—		—		—		2	0
Atlético San Luis	2025–26	Liga MX	7	1	—		—		—		7	1
Atlético San Luis	2026–27	Liga MX	17	3	—		—		3 (Note: Appearances in Leagues Cup)	2	20	5
Atlético San Luis	Total		36	4	—		—		3	2	39	6
Austin FC II (loan)	2023	MLS Next Pro	24	6	—		—		—		23	5
Atlético Ottawa (loan)	2025	Canadian Premier League	29	11	5	3	—		—		34	14
Career total			122	23	5	3	0	0	3	2	130	28

== Honours ==
=== Team ===
Atlético Ottawa

- North Star Cup: 2025

Austin FC II

- MLS Next Pro Cup: 2023

North Texas SC

- USL League One Regular Season: 2019
- USL League One Championship: 2019

=== Individual ===
Atlético Ottawa

- Canadian Premier League Finals MVP: 2025
