= Bytown Boys Supporters Club =

Canadian soccer fan group

- Founded: 2011
- Type: Supporters' group
- Location: Ottawa
- Website: www.bytownboys.ca

The Bytown Boys Supporters Club (BBSC) is a Canadian independent supporters group based in Ottawa, which promotes the growth and support for soccer in the city. Founded in 2011, they were an officially recognized supporters club to Capital City FC of Ottawa Ottawa Fury PDL, and are the current supporters of Atlético Ottawa.

== History ==
Bytown Boys Supporters Club was founded in April 2011, in response to an expansion Canadian Soccer League (CSL) franchise being awarded to the city of Ottawa. During their inaugural season with Capital City F.C. in CSL, players, coaches, and the team itself praised the supporters club for their activity in support of the club, with team members such as Clint Irwin, Sullivan Silva, Kenny Caceros, Julien Edwards, Joel Bagby, and Shaun Harris noting the group's role in contributing to the home field advantage. On March 23, 2012, Capital City announced it would not field a team for the following Canadian Soccer League season, leaving the Bytown Boys without a club to support.

The sudden adjournment of Capital City put the future of the supporters club in question. In April 2012, however, the group reached an agreement with the Ottawa Fury. During the 2012 PDL season, BBSC supported the Fury in games at their home pitch at Algonquin College Soccer Complex, as they had a successful season reaching the PDL Conference Semifinals.

In 2013, the Bytown Boys supported the Ottawa Fury at their home ground, both at PDL games, and, for the first time, at Fury W-League games. In 2014, along with the Stony Monday Riot and Fury Ultras supporters groups, they supported the club in its inaugural season in the 2014 North American Soccer League season and the 2014 Canadian Championship.

== BBSC player of the year ==
At the end of every calendar year, the Bytown Boys conduct a vote to select the group's player of the year.

Year	Male player	Female player
2011	(United States) Clint Irwin	not awarded
2012	(Canada) Will Beauge	not awarded
2013	(Canada) Carl Haworth	(Canada) Jasmine Phillips
2014	(Republic of Ireland) Richie Ryan	(England) Kristy Moore
