= Ballou Tabla =

Canadian soccer player (born 1999)

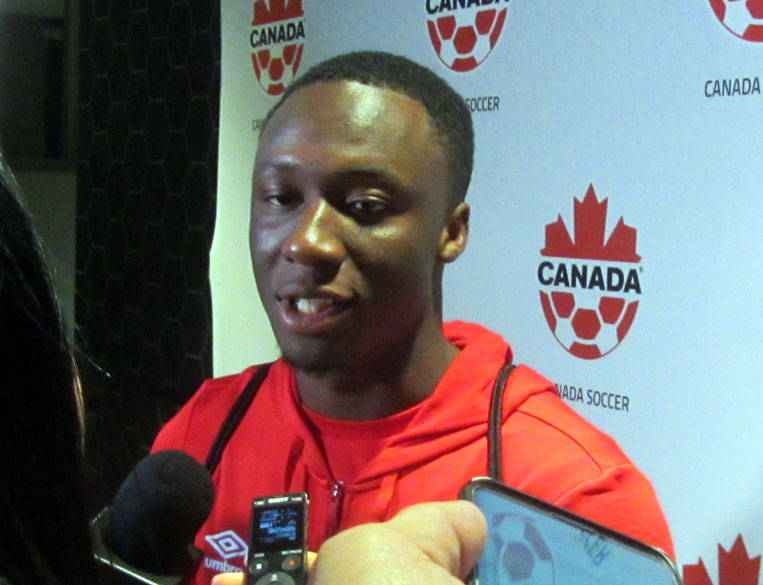
- Tabla in 2018

Personal information
- Full name: Ballou Jean-Yves Tabla
- Date of birth: 31 March 1999 (age 27)
- Place of birth: Abidjan, Ivory Coast
- Height: 1.75 m (5 ft 9 in)
- Position: Winger

Team information
- Current team: Atlético Ottawa
- Number: 13

Youth career
- Pointe-aux-Trembles
- 2012–2013: Montreal Impact
- 2013–2015: Panellinios
- 2015: Montreal Impact

Senior career*
Years	Team	Apps	(Gls)
2016	FC Montreal	21	(5)
2017	Montreal Impact	21	(2)
2018–2020	Barcelona B	30	(3)
2019	→ Albacete (loan)	2	(0)
2019	→ Montreal Impact (loan)	4	(0)
2020–2021	CF Montréal (Note: Montreal Impact changed its name to CF Montréal in 2021)	7	(1)
2022	Atlético Ottawa	27	(6)
2023	Manisa	21	(4)
2024–	Atlético Ottawa	55	(13)

International career^{‡}
2014–2015	Canada U17	5	(1)
2016–2018	Canada U20	7	(1)
2021	Canada U23	4	(0)
2018	Canada	2	(0)
- * Club domestic league appearances and goals as of October 25, 2025 ‡ National team caps and goals as of 28 March 2021

Ballou Jean-Yves Tabla (born 31 March 1999) is a professional soccer player who plays as a winger for Canadian Premier League side Atlético Ottawa. Born in Ivory Coast, he plays for the Canada national team.

== Early life ==
Tabla was born in Abidjan, Ivory Coast, on 31 March 1999, and he moved as a child to Canada at the age of eight. He was raised in Quebec. He played youth soccer with Pointe-aux-Trembles, a local amateur team. Tabla first joined the Montreal Impact Academy in 2012. On 9 December 2013, he left the club to join local amateur team Panellinios. In April 2015, he returned to the Impact as part of the team's U18 side, which finished the 2014/15 U.S. Soccer Development Academy in first place in the overall standings.

== Club career ==
=== FC Montreal ===
On 10 November 2015, it was announced that Tabla had signed for FC Montreal, the second team of the Impact which competed in the United Soccer League, the second tier of the Canadian soccer league system. He made his professional debut on 9 April 2016 and scored his first professional goal as Montreal fell 1–2 to Toronto FC II. While with FC Montreal, Tabla regularly trained with the first team, which included fellow Ivorian Didier Drogba. In February 2016, Tabla and three of his teammates had a training stint with Bologna of Serie A.

In April 2016, it was revealed that Tabla was being eyed by numerous big teams in Europe including Premier League clubs Arsenal, Manchester City and Chelsea, along with Barcelona. He was first spotted by scouts during a U20 match in March 2016, in which Canada beat England by a score of 2–1. It was also revealed that several European clubs had inquired about taking the player in on a trial.

=== Montreal Impact ===
On 20 October 2016, the Montreal Impact announced they had signed Tabla to a two-year contract as a homegrown player, which would begin in the 2017 season. During the 2017 season, he received comparisons to Canada international Alphonso Davies.

On 8 August 2017, the Montreal Gazette reported that Tabla "missed practice Tuesday as the MLS team confirmed it has received a transfer offer for the 18-year-old from a second-division European club". The next day, Tabla issued an apology through Twitter.

=== Barcelona B ===
On 25 January 2018, Tabla signed with Barcelona B on an initial three-year deal, with an optional two-year extension. His buyout clause was set at €25 million for the first three years, which would rise to €75 million if his contract option is picked up.

==== Loan to Albacete ====
On 31 January 2019, Tabla joined Segunda División side Albacete on loan until the end of the 2018–19 season.

=== Return to Montreal Impact ===
Tabla returned to Montreal on loan through to the end of the 2019 MLS season on August 7, 2019. In January 2020, Tabla signed with Montreal on a permanent transfer. In 2020, he suffered an adductor injury while playing for the club. Tabla did not feature much in the 2021 season, but he did play a crucial role in the club's Canadian Championship run, scoring two goals in stoppage time to give Montréal a 3–1 victory in the quarter-finals over HFX Wanderers, allowing Montreal to advance and ultimately win the trophy. After the 2021 season, CF Montreal would announce that they would not exercise the option on Tabla's contract, making him a free agent.

=== Atlético Ottawa ===
On 15 February 2022, Tabla signed a three-year contract with Canadian Premier League side Atlético Ottawa through the 2024 season. He made his debut on April 9 in Ottawa's season opener against Cavalry. Tabla scored his first goal for his new club on April 29, netting a late equalizer in a 2–2 draw with York United at the York Lions Stadium.

=== Manisa ===
On 25 January 2023, it was officially announced that Tabla had joined TFF First League side Manisa for an undisclosed fee. He subsequently made his debut for the Turkish club four days later, coming in as a substitute for Edgar Prib in the 62nd minute of a 1-1 league draw against Denizlispor.

=== Return to Atlético Ottawa ===
On 22 January 2024, Atlético Ottawa announced Tabla had returned to the side, signing a three-year contract following a mutual termination of his contract with Manisa. On August 11, 2026, Ballou Tabla became the all-time top scorer in the Canadian Championship history, scoring his milestone goal during a 3–3 draw against Supra du Québec.

== International career ==
=== Youth ===
Tabla was 14 years old when he first participated in a national camp. He has represented Canada at the U15, U17, U18, and U20 levels. He was named to Canada's squad for the 2015 CONCACAF U-17 Championship. In 2014, he was named the Canada U17 Male Player of the Year. In 2015, he played with the Canada U18s at the Slovakia Cup. In August 2016, Tabla was called up to the U-20 team for a pair of friendlies against Costa Rica In 2016, he was named the Canada Soccer U20 Player of the Year for his performances with the U-20 squad in friendlies against England and Honduras.

He later refused call-ups to Canada, citing a possibility to play for the Ivory Coast. It was reported that he sought advice from Didier Drogba, a former Ivory Coast striker with whom he struck a friendship during their time in Montreal. In September 2018, Tabla declared his international allegiance to Canada.

=== Senior ===
On 17 October 2018, Tabla made his senior national team debut, in a 2019–20 CONCACAF Nations League qualification match against Dominica. Tabla replaced Jonathan David in the 54th minute.

Tabla was named to the Canadian U-23 provisional roster for the 2020 CONCACAF Men's Olympic Qualifying Championship on February 26, 2020. He was named to the final squad on March 10, 2021.

== Career statistics ==
=== Club ===
As of November 9, 2025

Club	Season	League			Playoffs		National cup (Note: Includes Canadian Championship)		Continental		Other		Total	
Club	Season	Division	Apps	Goals	Apps	Goals	Apps	Goals	Apps	Goals	Apps	Goals	Apps	Goals
FC Montreal	2016	USL	21	5	–		0	0	–		–		21	5
Montreal Impact	2017	MLS	21	2	–		3	1	0	0	–		24	3
Barcelona B	2017–18	Segunda División	12	1	–		0	0	–		–		12	1
Barcelona B	2018–19	Segunda División B	18	2	–		0	0	–		1 (Note: One appearance in the Copa Catalunya)	0	19	2
Barcelona B	Total		30	3	0	0	0	0	0	0	1	0	31	3
Albacete (loan)	2018–19	Segunda División	2	0	–		0	0	–		–		2	0
Montreal Impact (loan)	2019	MLS	4	0	–		0	0	–		–		4	0
Montreal Impact	2020	MLS	5	1	0	0	0	0	2	0	–		7	1
CF Montréal	2021	MLS	2	0	–		2	2	–		–		4	2
CF Montréal	Total		11	1	0	0	2	2	2	0	0	0	15	3
Atletico Ottawa	2022	Canadian Premier League	27	6	3	1	1	0	–		–		31	7
Manisa	2022–23	TFF First League	14	3	–		0	0	–		–		14	3
Atletico Ottawa	2024	Canadian Premier League	28	2	2	0	3	1	–		–		33	3
Atletico Ottawa	2025	Canadian Premier League	27	11	2	0	5	1	–		–		34	12
Atletico Ottawa	Total		55	13	4	0	8	2	0	0	0	0	67	15
Career total			181	33	7	1	14	5	2	0	1	0	205	39

=== International ===
As of 18 November 2018

Canada
Year	Apps	Goals
2018	2	0
Total	2	0

== Honours ==
=== Club ===
Barcelona

- UEFA Youth League: 2017–18

Atlético Ottawa

- CPL Shield: 2022
- Canadian Premier League: 2025

=== Individual ===
- Canada Soccer U20 Player of the Year: 2016
- Canada Soccer U17 Player of the Year: 2014
- FSQ Male Youth Player of Excellence: 2014, 2015
