= 2024 Ligue1 Québec season =

Ligue1 Québec Men's Division
- Season: 2024
- Dates: April 20 – September 8
- Champions: FC Laval (2nd title)
- Coupe L1QC: CS St-Laurent (2nd title)

The 2024 Ligue1 Québec season is the thirteenth season of play for the Ligue1 Québec (and the second since rebranding from the Première ligue de soccer du Québec). L1Q is a division three semi-professional soccer league in the Canadian soccer league system and the highest level of soccer based in the Canadian province of Québec.

CS St-Laurent competed in the 2024 Canadian Championship as the league's representative as 2023 league champions.

== Changes from 2023 ==
CS Lanaudière-Nord withdrew from the league after the 2023 season. The Coupe L1Q will once again occur after the season, however, only the top eight clubs from the regular season will participate, rather than all clubs in the league like the previous season.

== Main Division ==
=== Teams ===
Eleven teams will participate in the 2024 season, with each team playing each other twice for a total of 20 matches. The league champion will earn a place in the 2025 Canadian Championship.

Team	City	Stadium	Head coach
A.S. Blainville	Blainville, Laurentides	Parc Blainville	
Celtix du Haut-Richelieu	Saint-Jean-sur-Richelieu, Montérégie	Parc Pierre-Benoît	
AS Laval	Laval, Laval	Parc de Lausanne	
FC Laval	Laval, Laval	Parc Berthiaume-Du Tremblay Stade	
CS Longueuil	Longueuil, Montérégie	Parc Laurier	
CF Montréal U23	Montréal, Montréal	Centre Nutrilait	
CS Mont-Royal Outremont	Mount Royal, Montréal	Parc Recreatif de TMR	
CS Saint-Laurent	Saint-Laurent, Montreal	Vanier College Stadium	
CS St-Hubert	Saint-Hubert, Montérégie	Centre Sportif Roseanne-Laflamme	
Ottawa South United	Ottawa, Ontario	TAAG Park at Carleton University	
Royal-Sélect de Beauport	Quebec City, Capitale-Nationale	Stade Beauport	

=== Standings ===
Pos	Team	Pld	W	D	L	GF	GA	GD	Pts	Qualification
1	FC Laval (C)	20	12	3	5	40	29	+11	39	Canadian Championship and Coupe L1QC
2	CS Saint-Laurent	20	10	7	3	39	20	+19	37	Coupe L1QC
3	AS Blainville	20	8	6	6	27	21	+6	30	Coupe L1QC
4	CS St-Hubert	20	8	3	9	37	40	−3	27	Coupe L1QC
5	Royal-Sélect de Beauport	20	6	9	5	36	31	+5	27	Coupe L1QC
6	CF Montréal U23	20	7	5	8	27	29	−2	26	Coupe L1QC
7	CS Longueuil	20	6	6	8	23	28	−5	24	Coupe L1QC
8	CS Mont-Royal Outremont	20	5	8	7	27	28	−1	23	Coupe L1QC
9	Ottawa South United	20	6	5	9	20	24	−4	23	
10	Celtix du Haut-Richelieu	20	5	6	9	24	38	−14	21	
11	AS Laval	20	4	8	8	27	39	−12	20	

Source: Spordle
(C) Champions

==== Statistics ====
Top goalscorers

Rank	Player	Club	Goals
1	Shawn Altidor Viau	AS Laval	12
2	Mouhamadou Kane	CS St-Laurent	8
2	Lukumbi Tshindaye	Royal-Sélect de Beauport	8
4	Joseph Greguy Saint-Simon	CS Mont-Royal Outremont	7
5	Julien Bruce	FC Laval	6
5	Marc-Alexandre Happi Emaga	CF Montréal U23	6
5	Victor Chiasson	FC Laval	6
8	Alexis Jeanne	FC Laval	5
8	Gabriel Wiethaeuper-Balbinotti	Celtix du Haut-Richelieu	5
8	Arthur Polla	Royal-Sélect de Beauport	5
8	Charles-Emile Brunet	CS Longueuil	5
8	Elliot Viel	CS Longueuil	5

Source: Spordle

==== Awards ====
Award	Player (club)	Ref
Ballon d'or (Best Player)	Oussama Boughanmi (CS Saint-Laurent)	
Ballon d'argent (2nd Best Player)	Quentin Paumier (FC Laval)	
Ballon de bronze (3rd Best Player)	Martin Cantona (FC Laval)	
Soulier D'Or (Golden Boot - Top Scorer)	Shawn Altidor Viau (AS Laval)	
Gant D'Or (Golden Glove - Top Goalkeeper)	Kosta Maniatis (CS St-Laurent)	
Coach of the Year	Mario Kancel (FC Laval)	

=== Coupe L1QC ===
The league cup will occur after the season, with the top-eight clubs from the season advancing to the cup.

Quarterfinals; September 14–15
1	FC Laval	4
8	CS Mont-Royal Outremont (a.e.t.)	5
4	CS St-Hubert	3
5	Royal-Sélect de Beauport	1
2	CS St-Laurent (a.e.t.)	3
7	CS Longueuil	2
3	AS Blainville	0
6	CF Montréal U23	1

Semifinals; September 22–23
8	CS Mont-Royal Outremont	5
4	CS St-Hubert	0
2	CS St-Laurent	4
6	CF Montréal U23	2

Final; September 29
8	CS Mont-Royal Outremont	1
2	CS St-Laurent	2

Source: Spordle

=== Friendlies ===
July 3, 2024 Maple Cup	(United States) Vermont Green FC	5–0	FC Laval	Burlington, Vermont, United States
	O'Neil 9' (pen.), 53'; Labovitz 25', 43'; Bazini 74' (pen.)	Report		Stadium: Virtue Field; Attendance: 2500; Referee: Jason Weischedel

== Reserve Division ==
The league will operate a reserve division. Each team, apart from the CF Montréal Academy, will operate a reserve team, playing each other once. AS Pierrefonds, who play in the women's division but not the men's, will field a team in the division as well.

=== Standings ===
Pos	Team	Pld	W	D	L	GF	GA	GD	Pts
1	Ottawa South United Reserves (C)	14	10	2	2	29	10	+19	32
2	AS Laval Reserves	14	9	1	4	27	30	−3	28
3	CS St-Hubert Reserves	13	7	3	3	35	13	+22	24
4	Royal-Sélect de Beauport Reserves	14	7	2	5	18	19	−1	23
5	CS Mont-Royal Outremont Reserves	13	6	1	6	22	19	+3	19
6	Celtix du Haut-Richelieu Reserves	13	6	0	7	23	21	+2	18
7	CS Longueuil Reserves	14	5	2	7	18	19	−1	17
8	CS Saint-Laurent Reserves	14	4	4	6	14	16	−2	16
9	AS Blainville Reserves	14	4	3	7	20	25	−5	15
10	FC Laval Reserves	14	4	3	7	14	22	−8	15
11	AS Pierrefonds	13	1	3	9	9	35	−26	6

Source: Spordle
(C) Champions

=== Playoffs ===
Round of 16; August 4
8	CS Saint-Laurent Reserves	2
9	AS Blainville Reserves	0
7	CS Longueuil Reserves	2
10	FC Laval Reserves	3
6	Celtix du Haut-Richelieu Reserves	1
11	AS Pierrefonds	3

Quarter-Finals; August 10–11
1	Ottawa South United Reserves	3
8	CS Saint-Laurent Reserves	2
4	Royal-Sélect de Beauport Reserves	0
5	CS Mont-Royal Outremont Reserves	2
2	AS Laval Reserves	1
10	FC Laval Reserves	3
3	CS Mont-Royal Outremont Reserves	1
11	AS Pierrefonds	2

Semi-Finals; August 17–18
1	Ottawa South United Reserves	0(4)
5	CS Mont-Royal Outremont Reserves	0(3)
10	FC Laval Reserves	2
11	AS Pierrefonds	1

Final; August 24
1	Ottawa South United Reserves	3
10	FC Laval Reserves	2

=== Awards ===
Award	Player (club)	Ref
Ballon d'or (Best Player)	Adam Ross (Ottawa South United Reserves)	
Ballon d'argent (2nd Best Player)	Raffaello Papadopoullos (CS Mont-Royal Outremont Reserves)	
Ballon de bronze (3rd Best Player)	Peter Guessan (CS St-Hubert Reserves)	
Soulier D'Or (Golden Boot - Top Scorer)	Peter Guessan (CS St-Hubert Reserves)	
Gant D'Or (Golden Glove - Top Goalkeeper)	Tristan Crampton (Ottawa South United Reserves)	
Coach of the Year	Vlad Vrsecky (Ottawa South United Reserves)	
