= Charles-Emile Brunet =

Canadian soccer player (born 2003)

Personal information
- Date of birth: November 26, 2003 (age 22)
- Place of birth: Montreal, Quebec, Canada
- Height: 1.73 m (5 ft 8 in)
- Position: Midfielder

Team information
- Current team: St. Louis City SC (on loan from Nashville SC)
- Number: 18

Youth career
- CF Montréal

College career
| Years | Team | Apps | (Gls) |
| 2021–2023 | Aigles du Collège Ahuntsic | 19 | (16) |
| 2024 | Central Arkansas Bears | 17 | (2) |
| 2025 | SMU Mustangs | 20 | (2) |

Senior career*
| Years | Team | Apps | (Gls) |
| 2022–2024 | CS Longueuil | | |
| 2026– | Huntsville City FC | 5 | (0) |
| 2026– | Nashville SC | 3 | (0) |
| 2026– | → St. Louis City SC (loan) | 1 | (0) |
| 2026– | → St. Louis City 2 (loan) | 0 | (0) |
- * Club domestic league appearances and goals as of October 25, 2026

Charles-Emile Brunet (born November 23, 2003) is a Canadian soccer player who plays as a midfielder for Major League Soccer side St. Louis City SC, on loan from Nashville SC.

== Career ==
=== College ===
A CF Montréal product, Brunet spent three seasons at Collège Ahuntsic and in 2023 was named both the team and Réseau du sport étudiant du Québec (RSEQ) MVP. He was also named to the Canadian Collegiate Athletic Association (CCAA) All-Canadian team, and was a finalist for the CCAA Men's Soccer Player of the Year award.

In 2024 Brunet joined Central Arkansas University of the National Collegiate Athletics Association (NCAA), members of the Atlantic Sun Conference (ASUN). At the end of the season he was named to the ASUN All-Freshman Team. In February 2025 Brunet transferred to Southern Methodist University of the Atlantic Coast Conference (ACC). He captured the 2025 ACC Championship with the Mustangs and was named to the All-ACC Third Team and the All-South Region Team.

=== Club ===
From 2022 to 2024 Brunet made appearances for CS Longueuil of Ligue1 Québec.

In December 2025, Brunet was drafted by Major League Soccer (MLS) side Nashville SC. In February 2026, Nashville announced they had signed Brunet to a contract through 2026, with options through the 2028–29 season. He made his professional debut with Nashville's MLS Next Pro affiliate Huntsville City FC on March 6 against Crown Legacy FC. Brunet made his MLS debut on May 9 against DC United.

On September 2, 2026, Brunet joined fellow MLS club St. Louis City SC on loan until the end of the 2026 season.
