= Diego Mejía (footballer, born 1983) =

Mexican footballer (born 1983)

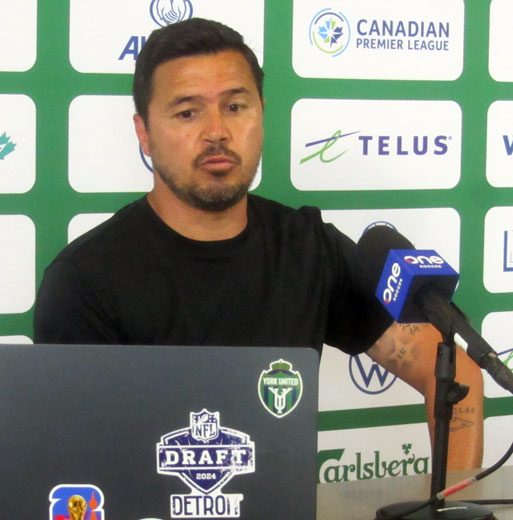
- Mejía in 2025

Personal information
- Full name: Diego Andrei Mejía Campo
- Date of birth: 12 October 1983 (age 43)
- Place of birth: Querétaro, Mexico
- Height: 1.77 m (5 ft 9 1/2 in)
- Position: Midfielder

Team information
- Current team: Atlético San Luis (head coach)

Senior career*
Years	Team	Apps	(Gls)
2003–2005	Celaya	30	(1)
2005–2006	Querétaro	26	(0)
2006–2007	León	19	(1)
2007–2016	Dorados de Sinaloa	86	(12)
2008	→ Tijuana (loan)	15	(0)
2008	→ Tiburones Rojos (loan)	15	(1)
2009	→ Albinegros de Orizaba (loan)	13	(1)
2011	→ Atlante UTN (loan)	16	(4)
2011	→ Toros Neza (loan)	11	(5)
2012	→ Morelia (loan)	2	(0)
2012–2013	→ Toros Neza (loan)	23	(7)
2013–2014	→ Delfines (loan)	26	(5)
2016–2018	Morelia	0	(0)
Total		282	(37)

Managerial career
- 2021–2023: Juárez (assistant)
- 2023–2024: Juárez
- 2025–2026: Atlético Ottawa
- 2026–: Atlético San Luis
- * Club domestic league appearances and goals

Diego Andrei Mejía Campo (born 12 October 1983) is a Mexican football manager and former professional footballer who serves as head coach of Mexican club Atlético San Luis.

== Playing career ==
In 2003, Mejía began playing with Celaya in the Mexican second tier Primera División A.

In 2005, he joined Querétaro.

In 2006, he joined in the Primera División de México.

In 2007, he joined Dorados de Sinaloa, making only four appearances in his first season due to injuries. Between 2008 and 2009, he had loan spells with Tijuana, Tiburones Rojos, and Albinegros de Orizaba, before returning to the Dorados squad. From 2011 to 2014, he had loan spells with Atlante UTN, Toros Neza, Morelia, Toros Neza, and Delfines.

In June 2016, he signed with Morelia on a permanent transfer. In 2018, he retired and ended his playing career.

== Managerial career ==
After retiring from playing, he went to Europe to earn his UEFA coaching license. Afterwards, he worked with Manchester City as a talent scout.

In 2020, he joined Liga MX club Juárez in their Sports Intelligence department. In 2021, he was named as an assistant coach. In April 2023, he was promoted to manager and technical director for the remainder of the season, following the dismissal of Hernán Cristante. In May 2023, it was confirmed that he would remain as manager for the following season. In November 2023, Juarez announced he would continue in charge for another tournament. At the end of January 2024, he was fired, following the club earning only one point in their first three matches of the season.

In January 2025, Mejía was named the head coach of Canadian Premier League club Atlético Ottawa. In 2026, he returned to Mexico to manage Atlético San Luis.

== Managerial statistics ==
As of 20 November 2026

Managerial record by team and tenure
Team	Nat	From	To	Record							
Team	Nat	From	To	G	W	D	L	GF	GA	GD	Win %
Juárez	(Mexico)	3 April 2023	30 January 2024	28	6	7	15	32	53	−21	21.43
Atlético Ottawa	(Canada)	15 January 2025	23 May 2026	45	26	11	8	79	56	+23	57.78
Atlético San Luis	(Mexico)	3 June 2026	Present	20	5	5	10	25	35	−10	25.00
Career total				93	36	23	34	136	144	−8	38.71

== Honours ==
- Canadian Premier League Manager of the Month: June 2025, September 2025
