= Atlético Ottawa =

Canadian professional soccer club based in Ottawa

- Nickname: Ottleti
- Founded: January 29, 2020; 6 years ago
- Stadium: TD Place Stadium
- Capacity: 6,419
- Owner: Atlético Madrid
- CEO: Manuel Vega
- President: Jeff Hunt
- Coach: Gustavo Leal
- League: Canadian Premier League
- 2026: Regular season: 3rd Playoffs: Runners-up
- Website: www.cplsoccer.com/atleticoottawa
| Home colours | Away colours |

Atlético Ottawa is a Canadian professional soccer club based in Ottawa, Ontario. The club competes in the Canadian Premier League and plays its home games at TD Place. The team was founded in 2020 by Spanish club Atlético Madrid.

== History ==
From 2014 to 2019, Ottawa Fury FC competed in American-based soccer leagues, most recently the USL Championship. The Fury dissolved after the 2019 season after they were not sanctioned to play in the USL for the following season, due to expectation that they would instead play in the emerging Canadian Premier League. This left Ottawa without a professional soccer team heading into the 2020 season.

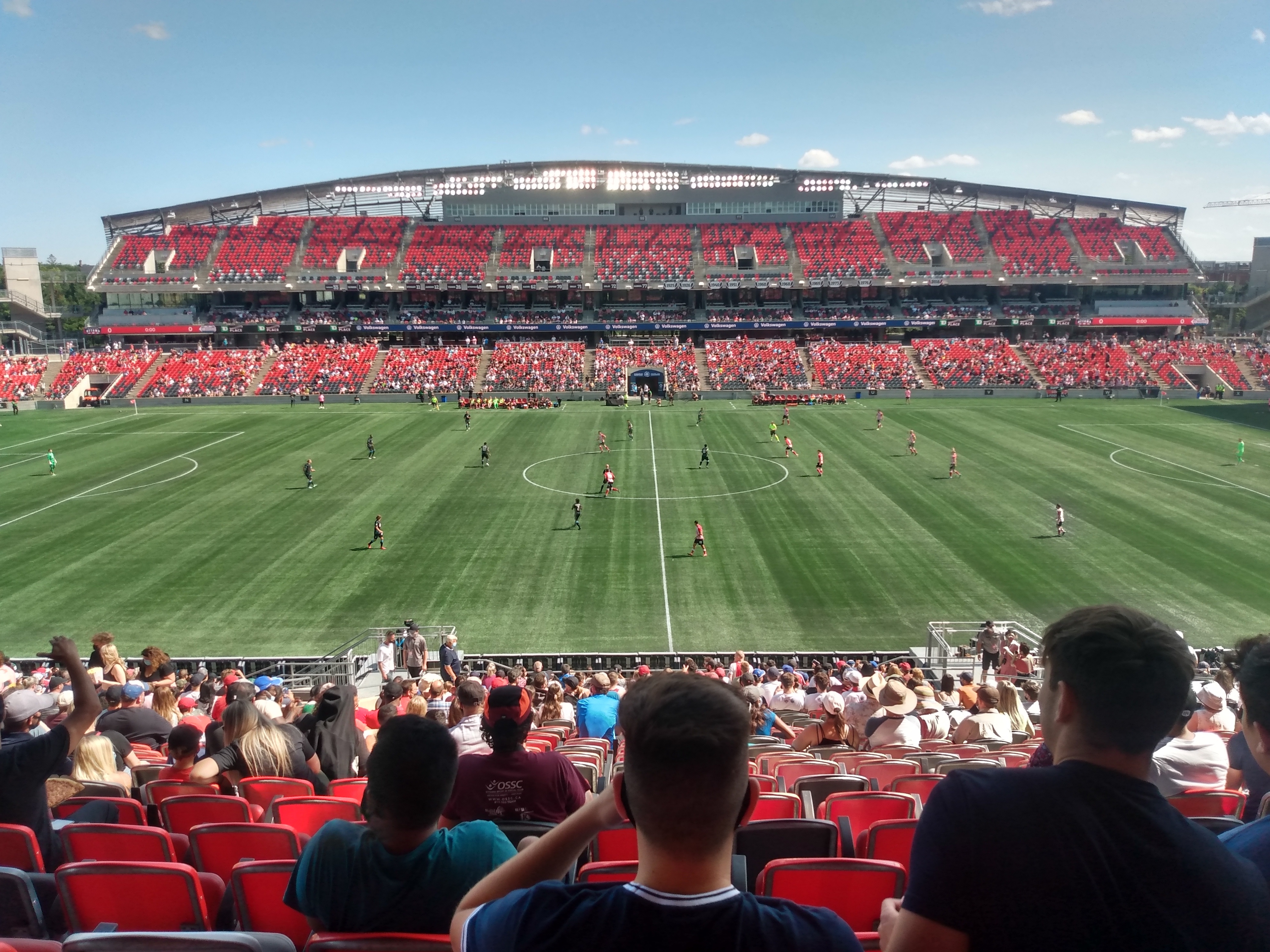
Moments after kick-off at Atlético Ottawa's first home game on August 14, 2021

On January 29, 2020, it was announced that Ottawa had been awarded the Canadian Premier League's first expansion team to be owned by Spanish club Atlético Madrid with Ottawa businessman Jeff Hunt as a strategic partner. The club debuted in the 2020 Canadian Premier League season under the name Atlético Ottawa.

The club's identity, including name, crest, and colours, was unveiled on February 11, 2020. The day was proclaimed "Atlético Ottawa Day" by Ottawa mayor Jim Watson. Mista was announced as the first head coach and general manager of the club.

Atlético Ottawa games are broadcast on OneSoccer, and on TSN1200 in radio format.

After playing the 2020 season and start of the 2021 season at neutral-site venues due to the COVID-19 pandemic, Atlético Ottawa made their home debut on August 14, 2021. Over 12,000 people were in attendance as Ottawa defeated the HFX Wanderers 2–1.

Following a 3–1 victory over Cavalry FC on September 24, 2022, Atlético Ottawa qualified for the Canadian Premier League playoffs for the first time. On October 8, 2022, Atlético Ottawa clinched the 2022 CPL regular season championship.

In 2025, Ottawa went undefeated at home for the first time, and won their first playoff trophy in the final. This also qualified the club to debut in the 2026 CONCACAF Champions Cup.

== Stadium ==
Atlético Ottawa play at TD Place at Lansdowne Park in the Glebe neighbourhood of Ottawa. The stadium is shared with the Ottawa Redblacks Canadian football team, the Ottawa Rapid FC women’s soccer team, and formerly hosted Ottawa Fury FC as well as nine matches from the 2015 FIFA Women's World Cup.

== Crest and colours ==
The club's identity is based upon that of its parent club, Atlético Madrid. The crest features a blue silhouette of the Peace Tower on Ottawa's Parliament Hill. Underneath are red and white stripes, evoking Atlético Madrid's crest and Canada's flag. At the base of the crest is a maple leaf. The club's alternate logo is a canoe paddle crossed by two arrows, taken from the city's coat of arms, with the monogram "AO".

Like Atlético Madrid, the club's colours are red, white, and blue (branded by the club as "federal red", "blanc d'Ottawa", and "Rideau blue").

=== Kit history ===
Home and away kits.

- Home

| 2020 | 2021 | 2022 | 2023 | 2024 | 2025 | 2026 |

- Away

| 2020–21 | 2022 | 2023 | 2024 | 2025 | 2026 |

=== Kit suppliers and sponsors ===
| Period | Kit manufacturer | Chest sponsor | Sleeve sponsor |
|---|---|---|---|
| 2020 | Macron | OneSoccer | None |
| 2021–2022 | Macron | ComeOn! | CIBC |
| 2023–2024 | Macron | Maple Lodge Farms | CIBC |
| 2025 | Macron | Maple Lodge Farms | None |
| 2026–present | Hummel | Maple Lodge Farms | Moneris |

== Club culture ==
=== Supporters ===
Atlético Ottawa's two main supporters groups are the Capital City Supporters Group (CCSG) and the Bytown Boys. The two groups are located in Section W of TD Place during home games and have gained a reputation for being a leading example for supporters culture in the Canadian Premier League.

Some notable introductions to the gameday atmosphere from the supporters include Wally, an inflatable dinosaur that has become an adoptive mascot of the supporters section, the "Olliewood" sign on the eastern hill of TD Place, in honour of 2022 CPL Player of the Year Ollie Bassett, and wide variety of characters strewn about the supporters section in non-traditional matchday garb. The "Olliewood" sign was replaced with one which reads "Wallywood" after Bassett departed the club in 2024.

The support for the club has continued to grow and manifested in a record crowd of 14,992 for the 2022 Canadian Premier League Final against Forge FC. This marked the largest paid attendance for any Atlético Ottawa match to date.

== Honours ==
Atlético Ottawa honours
| Type | Competition | Titles | Seasons |
|---|---|---|---|
| Domestic | Canadian Premier League | 1 | 2025 |
| Domestic | Regular season | 1 | 2022 |

== Players and staff ==
=== Squad ===
As of August 20, 2026

Note: Flags indicate national team as defined under FIFA eligibility rules; some limited exceptions apply. Players may hold more than one non-FIFA nationality.

| No. | Pos. | Nation | Player |
|---|---|---|---|
| 1 | GK | CAN | Tristan Crampton |
| 2 | MF | MEX | Juan Castro |
| 3 | DF | CAN | Julian Dunn |
| 4 | DF | CAN | Tyr Walker |
| 5 | MF | MEX | Daniel Aguilar |
| 6 | MF | CAN | Diego Gutiérrez |
| 7 | FW | MEX | Emiliano García (on loan from Atlético San Luis) |
| 8 | MF | MEX | Jonantán Villal (on loan from Atlético San Luis) |
| 9 | FW | MEX | Amaury Escoto |
| 10 | MF | CAN | Manuel Aparicio (captain) |
| 11 | MF | BRA | Gabriel Antinoro |
| 13 | FW | CAN | Ballou Tabla |
| 14 | FW | CAN | Jean-Aniel Assi |

| No. | Pos. | Nation | Player |
|---|---|---|---|
| 18 | DF | GEQ | Roni Mbomio |
| 19 | FW | LBN | Ralph Khoury |
| 20 | DF | CAN | Joaquim Coulanges |
| 21 | FW | CAN | Nicolas Fleuriau Chateau |
| 23 | DF | CAN | Noah Abatneh |
| 27 | DF | CAN | Wesley Timóteo |
| 28 | DF | CAN | Loïc Cloutier |
| 30 | MF | CAN | Kamron Habibullah |
| 31 | GK | CAN | Christopher Kalongo |
| 37 | MF | FRA | Tim Arnaud |
| 77 | FW | CAN | Reinaldo Abraham |
| 84 | DF | CAN | Sergei Kozlovskiy |
| 91 | DF | CAN | Luca Levillain |

=== Staff ===
As of January 15, 2025

Executive
| Chief executive officer | (Mexico) Manuel Vega |
| Chief operating officer | (Canada) Jon Sinden |
| Strategic partner | (Canada) Jeff Hunt |
| Assistant general manager | (Canada) J.D. Ulanowski |
| Director of youth development | (Canada) Drew Beckie |
Coaching staff
| Head coach | (Brazil) Gustavo Leal |
| Assistant coach | (Brazil) Alexandre Gomes |
| Assistant coach | (Canada) Drew Beckie |
| Goalkeeping coach | (France) Romuald Peiser |
| Strength and conditioning coach | (Canada) Ibrahim Soukary |

=== Head coaches ===
As of May 31, 2026

| Coach | Nation | Tenure | Record | | | | |
| Coach | Nation | Tenure | G | W | D | L | Win % |
|---|---|---|---|---|---|---|---|
| Mista | Spain | February 11, 2020 – December 28, 2021 | 36 | 8 | 10 | 18 | 22.22 |
| Carlos González | Spain | February 24, 2022 – November 21, 2024 | 95 | 37 | 31 | 27 | 38.95 |
| Diego Mejía | Mexico | January 15, 2025 – May 31, 2026 | 43 | 24 | 11 | 8 | 55.81 |
| Gustavo Leal | Brazil | July 17, 2026 – present | 7 | 4 | 2 | 1 | 57.14 |

=== Club captains ===
| Years | Player | Nation |
|---|---|---|
| 2020 | Ben Fisk | Canada |
| 2021 | Milovan Kapor | Canada |
| 2021–2022 | Drew Beckie | Canada |
| 2023 | Carl Haworth | Canada |
| 2024 | Maxim Tissot | Canada |
| 2025 | Nathan Ingham | Canada |
| 2026– | Manny Aparicio | Canada |

== Records ==
=== Year-by-year ===
| Season | League | | | | | | | | | | | | Playoffs | CC | Continental | Average attendance | Top goalscorer(s) | |
| Season | Div | League | Pld | W | D | L | GF | GA | GD | Pts | PPG | Pos. | Playoffs | CC | Continental | Average attendance | Name | Goals |
|---|---|---|---|---|---|---|---|---|---|---|---|---|---|---|---|---|---|---|
| **2020**^{a} | 1 | CPL | 7 | 2 | 2 | 3 | 7 | 12 | −5 | 8 | 1.14 | 7th | DNQ | DNQ | Ineligible | N/A | (Mexico) Francisco Acuña (Canada) Malcolm Shaw | 2 |
| **2021** | 1 | CPL | 28 | 6 | 8 | 14 | 30 | 47 | −17 | 26 | 0.93 | 8th | DNQ | PR | DNQ | 3,618 | (Canada) Malcolm Shaw | 10 |
| **2022** | 1 | CPL | 28 | 13 | 10 | 5 | 36 | 29 | 7 | 49 | 1.78 | **1st** | RU | PR | DNQ | 4,069 | (Northern Ireland) Ollie Bassett | 8 |
| **2023** | 1 | CPL | 28 | 10 | 6 | 12 | 38 | 34 | 4 | 36 | 1.29 | 6th | DNQ | QF | N/A | 4,959 | (Northern Ireland) Ollie Bassett | 12 |
| **2024** | 1 | CPL | 28 | 11 | 11 | 6 | 42 | 31 | 11 | 44 | 1.57 | 3rd | SF | QF | DNQ | 5,478 | (Switzerland) Rubén del Campo | 14 |
| **2025** | 1 | CPL | 28 | 15 | 11 | 2 | 54 | 28 | 26 | 56 | 2.00 | 2nd | **W** | SF | DNQ | 4,961 | (Canada) Samuel Salter | 24 |

1. Average attendance include statistics from league matches only.
2. Top goalscorer(s) includes all goals scored in league season, league playoffs, Canadian Championship, CONCACAF League, and other competitive continental matches.
a: Due to the COVID-19 Pandemic, the season was held exclusively in Charlottetown, Prince Edward Island, without fans formatted as a double round robin season with a single match final

=== International competition ===
The following is a list of results for Atlético Ottawa in international competitions. Atlético Ottawa's scores are listed first.

| Year | Tournament | Round | Opponent | Home | Away | Agg. |
|---|---|---|---|---|---|---|
| 2026 | CONCACAF Champions Cup | Round One | (United States) Nashville SC | 0–2 | 0–5 | 0–7 |
| 2027 | CONCACAF Champions Cup | Round One | TBD | | | |

=== Most appearances ===
As of October 11, 2026

| # | Name | Nation | Career at club | Games played | | | |
| # | Name | Nation | Career at club | CPL | Cup | Int'l | Total |
|---|---|---|---|---|---|---|---|
| 1 | **Ballou Tabla** | Canada | 2022, 2024– | 115 | 12 | 2 | 129 |
| 2 | **Gabriel Antinoro** | Brazil | 2023– | 96 | 12 | 2 | 110 |
| 3 | Nathan Ingham | Canada | 2022–2025 | 102 | 7 | 0 | 109 |
| 4 | Samuel Salter | Canada | 2023–2025 | 87 | 10 | 0 | 97 |
| 4 | **Manny Aparicio** | Canada | 2024– | 84 | 11 | 2 | 97 |
| 6 | Ollie Bassett | Northern Ireland | 2022–2024 | 86 | 6 | 0 | 92 |
| 7 | Miguel Acosta | Spain | 2021–2023 | 81 | 4 | 0 | 85 |
| 8 | Malcolm Shaw | Trinidad and Tobago | 2020–2023 | 80 | 3 | 0 | 83 |
| 9 | Alberto Zapater | Spain | 2023–2025 | 65 | 8 | 0 | 73 |
| 10 | Zach Verhoven | Canada | 2021–2023 | 62 | 3 | 0 | 65 |

Note: Bold indicates active player

=== Most goals ===
As of October 11, 2026

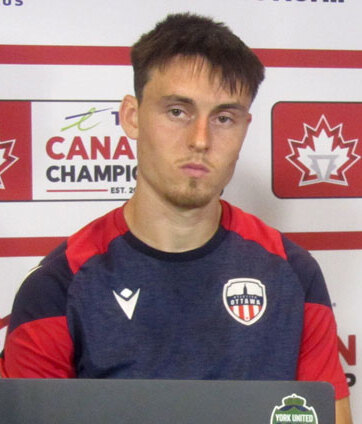
Samuel Salter is the all-time leading goalscorer for the club, with 37 goals.

| # | Name | Nation | Career at club | Goals scored | | | |
| # | Name | Nation | Career at club | CPL | Cup | Int'l | Total |
|---|---|---|---|---|---|---|---|
| 1 | Samuel Salter | Canada | 2023–2025 | 32 | 5 | 0 | 37 |
| 1 | **Ballou Tabla** | Canada | 2022, 2024– | 31 | 6 | 0 | 37 |
| 3 | Ollie Bassett | Northern Ireland | 2022–2024 | 23 | 3 | 0 | 26 |
| 4 | Malcolm Shaw | Trinidad and Tobago | 2020–2023 | 17 | 2 | 0 | 19 |
| 5 | Brian Wright | Canada | 2021–2022 | 13 | 1 | 0 | 14 |
| 5 | Rubén del Campo | Switzerland | 2023–2024 | 12 | 2 | 0 | 14 |
| 5 | David Rodríguez | Mexico | 2025– | 11 | 3 | 0 | 14 |
| 8 | **Gabriel Antinoro** | Brazil | 2023– | 9 | 0 | 0 | 9 |
| 9 | **Nicolas Fleuriau Chateau** | Canada | 2026– | 6 | 2 | 0 | 8 |
| 10 | Zach Verhoven | Canada | 2021–2023 | 7 | 0 | 0 | 7 |
| 10 | **Manny Aparicio** | Canada | 2024– | 7 | 0 | 0 | 7 |

Note: Bold indicates active player

=== Most assists ===
As of August 28, 2026

| # | Name | Nation | Career at club | Assists | | | |
| # | Name | Nation | Career at club | CPL | Cup | Int'l | Total |
|---|---|---|---|---|---|---|---|
| 1 | **Ballou Tabla** | Canada | 2022, 2024– | 14 | 2 | 0 | 16 |
| 2 | **Manny Aparicio** | Canada | 2024– | 11 | 1 | 0 | 12 |
| 3 | David Rodríguez | Mexico | 2025 | 9 | 2 | 0 | 11 |
| 3 | **Gabriel Antinoro** | Brazil | 2023– | 9 | 2 | 0 | 11 |
| 5 | Ollie Bassett | Northern Ireland | 2022–2024 | 10 | 0 | 0 | 10 |
| 6 | Zach Verhoven | Canada | 2021–2023 | 9 | 0 | 0 | 9 |
| 6 | Carl Haworth | Canada | 2022–2023 | 8 | 1 | 0 | 9 |
| 8 | Samuel Salter | Canada | 2023– | 7 | 1 | 0 | 8 |
| 9 | Dani Morer | Spain | 2024 | 6 | 1 | 0 | 7 |
| 10 | Miguel Acosta | Spain | 2021–2023 | 6 | 0 | 0 | 6 |

Note: Bold indicates active player
