= Canadian Premier League Finals =

Annual championship game of the CPL

Canadian Premier League Final
- Organiser(s): Canadian Premier League
- Founded: 2019
- Region: CONCACAF
- Qualifier for: CONCACAF Champions Cup
- Current champions: Cavalry FC (2026, 2nd title)
- Most championships: Forge FC (4 titles)
- Broadcaster(s): CBC, OneSoccer, and TSN
- 2026 Canadian Premier League final

The Canadian Premier League Final is the annual championship game of the Canadian Premier League (CPL), the top level of Canadian soccer. It is played as a single match hosted by the winner of the first semifinal against the winner of the second semifinal at the conclusion of the league's annual playoff. The finals winner is awarded the North Star Cup trophy and earns a berth in round one of the CONCACAF Champions Cup.

The CPL uses a playoff tournament following the regular season to determine its annual league champion, a method common to every other major North American sports league. This format differs from most soccer leagues around the world, which consider the club with the most points at the end of the season to be the champion. Since 2023, the league has honoured the regular season winners with the CPL Shield.

The inaugural finals were played as a two-legged tie in 2019 in which Forge FC defeated Cavalry FC. Forge FC is the most successful team in finals history, winning additional titles in 2020, 2022, and 2023.

== Format ==
Many formats and methods of qualification were used over the first several CPL seasons.

=== 2019 ===
The 2019 finals were contested between the winners of the Spring and Fall seasons. The championship was contested as a two-legged tie, with each team hosting one leg at home. The winner was determined by aggregate score but if the aggregate score was tied, the team with the most away goals wins the series. A penalty shoot-out was the final tiebreaker.

=== 2020 ===
The 2020 season saw the end of the split season format, with the 2020 finals scheduled to be contested between the top-seeded regular season team and the winner of a playoff between the second and third-placed teams. However, as a result of the COVID-19 pandemic, the season format was scrapped and replaced with a single-site tournament with a two-stage regular season. The 2020 final was contested in a single match between the two top-seeded teams from the four-team second stage.

=== 2021–present ===
Since the 2021 season, the CPL Final has been a single leg match between the two semifinal winners. If the match is tied at the end of normal playing time, extra time is played (two periods of 15 minutes each) and, if necessary, followed by a penalty shoot-out to determine the winners.

== Results ==
Season		Date	Champions	Score	Runners-up	MVP	Venue	Attendance	Television
2019	Leg 1	October 26	Forge FC	1–0	Cavalry FC	Not awarded	Tim Hortons Field	10,486	OneSoccer, CBC Sports
2019	Leg 2	November 2	Forge FC	1–0	Cavalry FC	Not awarded	ATCO Field	5,831	OneSoccer, CBC Sports
2020		September 19	Forge FC	2–0	HFX Wanderers FC	Not awarded	Alumni Field	0 (Note: Match was played behind closed doors.)	OneSoccer, CBC Sports
2021		December 5	Pacific FC	1–0	Forge FC	Not awarded	Tim Hortons Field	7,488	OneSoccer
2022		October 30	Forge FC	2–0	Atlético Ottawa	Not awarded	TD Place Stadium	14,992	OneSoccer
2023		October 28	Forge FC	2–1 (a.e.t.)	Cavalry FC	Not awarded	Tim Hortons Field	13,925	OneSoccer
2024		November 9	Cavalry FC	2–1	Forge FC	Tobias Warschewski	ATCO Field	7,052	OneSoccer, CBC Sports
2025		November 9	Atlético Ottawa	2–1 (a.e.t.)	Cavalry FC	David Rodríguez	TD Place Stadium	13,132	OneSoccer, TSN, FS2
2026		November 21	Cavalry FC	3–2	Atlético Ottawa	Tobias Warschewski	ATCO Field	9,131	CBC, OneSoccer, TSN

== Records and statistics ==
=== Finals wins ===
Club	W	L	App	Years of appearance
Forge FC	4	2	6	2019, 2020, 2021, 2022, 2023, 2024
Cavalry FC	2	3	5	2019, 2023, 2024, 2025, 2026
Atlético Ottawa	1	2	3	2022, 2025, 2026
Pacific FC	1	0	1	2021
HFX Wanderers FC	0	1	1	2020

=== Champions records in CONCACAF competitions ===
From 2019 until 2021, the CPL champion earned Canada's berth in the following year's CONCACAF League. Since 2023, the champion has qualified to CONCACAF Champions Cup.

CONCACAF League
Year	Club	Result
2019	Forge FC (Note: For the inaugural CPL season, Forge FC qualified as the winner of the 2019 Canadian CONCACAF League series.)	Round of 16
2020	Forge FC	Quarter-finals
2021	Forge FC	Semi-finals
2022	Pacific FC	Round of 16

CONCACAF Champions League/Cup
Year	Club	Result
2022	Forge FC (Note: Forge reached the Champions League due to their placement in the 2021 CONCACAF League, which they qualified for as 2020 CPL champions. Direct Canadian Premier League berths were only first awarded in 2023.)	Round of 16
2024	Forge FC	Round one
2025	Cavalry FC	Round one
2026	Atlético Ottawa	Round one
2027	Cavalry FC	TBD

== Scorers ==
Player	Club(s)	Goals	Appearances
(Germany) Tobias Warschewski	Cavalry FC	3 (2024 (1), 2026 (2))	3 (2024, 2025, 2026)
(Canada) David Choinière	Forge FC	2 (2019, 2022)	7 (2019^{2}, 2020, 2021, 2022, 2023, 2024)
(Canada) Tristan Borges	Forge FC	2 (2019, 2023)	6 (2019^{2}, 2021, 2022, 2023, 2024)
(Sweden) Alexander Achinioti-Jönsson	Forge FC	2 (2020, 2024)	7 (2019^{2}, 2020, 2021, 2022, 2023, 2024)
(Canada) Alessandro Hojabrpour	Pacific FC, Forge FC	2 (2021, 2022)	4 (2021, 2022, 2023, 2024)
(Canada) Sergio Camargo	Cavalry FC	2 (2024, 2026)	6 (2019^{2}, 2023, 2024, 2025, 2026)
(United States) David Rodríguez	Atlético Ottawa	2 (2025)	1 (2025)
(Canada) Maxim Tissot	Forge FC, Atlético Ottawa	1 (2020)	2 (2020, 2022)
(Belgium) Béni Badibanga	Forge FC	1 (2023)	2 (2023, 2024)
(Somalia) Ali Musse	Cavalry FC	1 (2023)	4 (2023, 2024, 2025, 2026)
(Canada) Fraser Aird	Cavalry FC	1 (2025)	3 (2023, 2024, 2025)
(Canada) Nicolas Fleuriau Chateau	Atlético Ottawa	1 (2026)	1 (2026)

Own goals

- (Germany) Daan Klomp (Cavalry FC) v Atlético Ottawa (2026)

== Trophy ==
North Star Shield used from 2019–2022

Since 2023, the winning team has been presented with the North Star Cup. The trophy was designed by ÉPICO Studios, a design agency that had previously designed trophies for the Copa América Centenario, CONCACAF Champions Cup, CONCACAF Gold Cup, CONCACAF Nations League, and MLS Cup. The North Star Cup replaced the North Star Shield which had been awarded from 2019 to 2022.

The North Star Cup used since 2023

== Venues ==
Name	Location	Hosted	Years hosted
Tim Hortons Field	Hamilton, Ontario	3	2019, (Note: Venue used for one leg of a two legged final.) 2021, 2023
ATCO Field	Foothills County, Alberta	3	2019, 2024, 2026
TD Place Stadium	Ottawa, Ontario	2	2022, 2025
Alumni Field	Charlottetown, Prince Edward Island	1	2020 (Note: Venue selected as a neutral ground.)

== Discipline ==
=== Yellow card suspensions ===
Rules concerning yellow card accumulation in regular season and playoff games and its impact on suspensions in the finals have changed over time. In 2019, yellow card accumulation in regular season games resulted in a suspension of Forge FC defender Bertrand Owundi for the first leg of that year's finals. However, when the format changed in 2020, the finals had appeared to have become exempt from suspensions.

The CPL's 2022 Competition Guidelines established that the league's "Championship matches" would be exempt from any yellow card accumulation suspensions and that a fines would replace any suspensions. Although the league later announced changes to yellow card suspensions and their impact on playoffs games on the eve of the 2022 playoffs, this change did not affect the rules for the final.

=== Red card suspensions ===
In the final match of the 2019 Canadian Premier League fall season, Dominic Samuel of Forge FC received a red card for two cautionable offences, and was subsequently suspended for the first leg of the finals. Forge FC would suffer a similar fate in 2022 when their captain Kyle Bekker was sent off in the second leg of the 2022 CPL semifinals against Cavalry, and prevented him from participating in the final against Atlético Ottawa.

=== Players sent off in the finals ===
List of red carded players
Player	Club	Match	Minute	Type	Score	Final
(Canada) Joel Waterman	Cavalry FC (a)	2019 final (1st leg)	37'	Red card	0–0	1–0
(Canada) Tristan Borges (Note: Borges's red card was rescinded by Canada Soccer after the match.)	Forge FC (h)	2019 final (1st leg)	69'	(red card)	1–0	1–0
(Panama) Omar Browne	Forge FC (h)	2021 final	90+1'	(yellow card) (yellow-red card)	0–1	0–1

== See also ==
- Canadian Championship finals
- MLS Cup
