= 2026 Canadian Premier League final =

Final match of a men's Canadian soccer league playoffs

- Event: 2026 Canadian Premier League season
Cavalry FC	Atlético Ottawa
3	2
- Date: November 21, 2026
- Venue: ATCO Field, Foothills County, Alberta
- CPL Finals MVP: Tobias Warschewski (Cavalry FC)
- Referee: Renzo Villanueva
- Attendance: 9,131
- Weather: Snow −5 °C (23 °F); 75% humidity

The 2026 Canadian Premier League final was the eighth edition of the CPL Finals, the post-season championship of the Canadian Premier League, the top level of Canadian soccer, which determined the winner of the 2026 Canadian Premier League season. It was played on November 21, 2026, at ATCO Field in Foothills County, Alberta between Cavalry FC and Atlético Ottawa.

== Path to the final ==
The 2026 CPL season was contested by eight teams. Each team played four games against each of the seven opponents for a total of 28 matches. The top four teams from the regular season qualified for the playoffs, which began on November 1, featuring two-leg semifinals followed by a single match final.

=== Regular season standings ===
Pos	Team	Pld	W	D	L	GF	GA	GD	Pts	Qualification
1	Cavalry FC (S, C)	28	18	6	4	58	23	+35	60	2027 CONCACAF Champions Cup and Playoffs (Note: As CPL Shield winner)
2	Forge FC (V)	28	17	7	4	49	22	+27	58	2027 CONCACAF Champions Cup and Playoffs (Note: As winners of Canadian Championship)
3	Atlético Ottawa	28	13	4	11	42	45	−3	43	2027 CONCACAF Champions Cup and Playoffs (Note: As the highest-ranked team not already qualified)
4	Supra du Québec	28	11	5	12	47	50	−3	38	Playoffs
5	Vancouver FC	28	10	7	11	39	37	+2	37	
6	Inter Toronto	28	7	9	12	42	65	−23	30	
7	HFX Wanderers	28	7	7	14	44	50	−6	28	
8	Pacific FC	28	2	9	17	33	62	−29	15	

Source: CPL
Rules for classification: 1) Points; 2) Total wins; 3) Head-to-head; 4) Goal differential; 5) Goals for; 6) Away goal differential; 7) Away goals for; 8) Home goal differential; 9) Home goals for; 10) Fewest disciplinary points; 11) Most under-21 domestic player minutes; 12) Drawing of lots.
(C) Champion; (S) CPL Shield winner; (V) Canadian Championship winners

=== Playoff bracket ===
Semifinals two-legged tie
1	Cavalry FC	1	2	3
4	Supra du Québec	2	0	2
2	Forge FC	2	2	4
3	Atlético Ottawa	2	3	5

Final single match
November 21
1	Cavalry FC	3
3	Atlético Ottawa	2

== Background ==
=== Cavalry FC ===
Cavalry FC reached the CPL final for the fourth consecutive time, and fifth overall time, in its eight seasons of play. Cavalry was previously the league champion in 2024, and the runner-up in 2019, 2023, and 2025.

=== Atlético Ottawa ===
Atlético Ottawa were the defending champion, having won for the first time in 2025. Ottawa reached the CPL final for the second consecutive time, and third overall time, in its seven seasons of play, having lost the final of 2022.

=== Head-to-head ===
In the 2026 regular season, Cavalry defeated Ottawa three times (3–1 on April 12, 3–0 on July 4, and 3–1 on August 22) and Ottawa defeated Cavalry once (3–2 on September 30).

This final was a rematch of the previous season's final, which Ottawa won 2–1 after extra time. That was the only previous postseason meeting between the teams.

== Venue ==
The host stadium for the final was ATCO Field, the home of Cavalry FC, located in Foothills County, Alberta, just south of Calgary. Hosting rights were awarded to the higher seeded team.

== Broadcasting ==
The CPL final was broadcast on CBC, OneSoccer, and TSN in Canada.

== Match ==
November 21
2:00 pm CST

Cavalry FC	3–2	Atlético Ottawa
Warschewski 5', 74'; Camargo 47'	Report	Klomp 65' (o.g.); Fleuriau Chateau 90+11' (pen.)

ATCO Field, Foothills County, Alberta
Attendance: 9,131
Referee: Renzo Villanueva

Cavalry	Atlético Ottawa

GK	29	(Canada) Nathan Ingham
DF	4	(Netherlands) Daan Klomp
DF	5	(France) Bradley Kamdem
DF	16	(Canada) Adam Pearlman		(substituted off) 86'
DF	55	(Canada) Amer Didić
MF	6	(Philippines) Michael Baldisimo		(substituted off) 90+3'
MF	8	(Canada) Harry Paton
MF	10	(Canada) Sergio Camargo (c)		(substituted off) 73'
FW	7	(Somalia) Ali Musse	(yellow card) 89'
FW	9	(Germany) Tobias Warschewski
FW	14	(Saint Lucia) Caniggia Elva		(substituted off) 73'
Substitutes:
GK	21	(Canada) Joseph Holliday
DF	15	(England) Levi Laing		(substituted on) 86'
DF	17	(Canada) Nathaniel Edwards		(substituted on) 73'
MF	18	(Canada) Maël Henry		(substituted on) 73'
MF	28	(Canada) Niko Myroniuk	(yellow card) 90+7'	(substituted on) 90+3'
FW	19	(Canada) Owen Antoniuk
FW	35	(Canada) Owen Graham-Roache
Manager: (England) Tommy Wheeldon Jr.

GK	31	(Canada) Christopher Kalongo
DF	3	(Canada) Julian Dunn
DF	18	(Equatorial Guinea) Roni Mbomio		(substituted off) 64'
DF	20	(Canada) Joaquim Coulanges	(yellow card) 44'	(substituted off) 64'
DF	84	(Canada) Sergei Kozlovskiy
MF	6	(Canada) Diego Gutiérrez		(substituted off) 84'
MF	10	(Canada) Manny Aparicio (c)	(yellow card) 7'
MF	11	(Brazil) Gabriel Antinoro
MF	30	(Canada) Kamron Habibullah
FW	7	(Mexico) Emiliano García		(substituted off) 64'
FW	21	(Canada) Nicolas Fleuriau Chateau
Substitutes:
GK	1	(Canada) Tristan Crampton
DF	4	(Canada) Tyr Walker	(yellow card) 89'	(substituted on) 64'
MF	2	(Mexico) Juan Castro		(substituted on) 84'
MF	37	(France) Tim Arnaud		(substituted on) 64'
FW	14	(Canada) Jean-Aniel Assi
FW	19	(Lebanon) Ralph Khoury		(substituted on) 64'
FW	77	(Canada) Reinaldo Abraham
Manager: (Brazil) Gustavo Leal

CPL Final MVP:
Tobias Warschewski (Cavalry FC)

Assistant referees:
Graham Forsyth
Travis Lefebvre
Fourth official:
Alain Ruch

Match rules

- 90 minutes
- 30 minutes of extra time if necessary
- Penalty shoot-out if score still level
- Maximum of five substitutions, with a sixth allowed in extra time

== See also ==
- Canadian Premier League Finals
- 2026 Canadian Championship final
