= 2026 Canadian Premier League season =

Professional soccer league season

Canadian Premier League
- Season: 2026
- Dates: April 4 – October 25 (regular season); November 1–21 (playoffs)
- Champions: Cavalry FC (2nd title)
- CPL Shield: Cavalry FC (3rd shield)
- CONCACAF Champions Cup: Atlético Ottawa; Cavalry FC; Forge FC
- Matches: 112
- Goals: 354 (3.16 per match)
- Top goalscorer: Loïc Kwemi (15 goals)
- Biggest home win: Cavalry FC 6–0 Supra du Québec (September 25)
- Biggest away win: Inter Toronto 1–5 Cavalry FC (June 10); Supra du Québec 1–5 Vancouver FC (July 17)
- Highest scoring: Atlético Ottawa 5–3 Supra du Québec (June 9)
- Longest winning run: 6 matches Forge FC (May 31 – July 26)
- Longest unbeaten run: 7 matches Cavalry FC (April 5 – May 24); Forge FC (May 31 – August 2)
- Longest winless run: 17 matches Pacific FC (April 5 – August 22)
- Longest losing run: 5 matches Pacific FC (June 14 – July 31)
- Highest attendance: 15,122; Forge FC 1–0 Supra du Québec (May 13)
- Lowest attendance: 1,025; Inter Toronto 3–1 Cavalry FC (October 3)
- Total attendance: 398,895
- Average attendance: 3,562

The 2026 Canadian Premier League season was the eighth season of the Canadian Premier League, the top men's professional level of the Canadian Soccer Association's league system. Cavalry FC clinched the CPL Shield in their final match of the regular season and defeated Atlético Ottawa in the final for the championship and the North Star Cup, becoming the first team to win both trophies in the same season.

== Rule changes ==
The league was the first senior competition in the world to trial a new version of the offside rule, where offside was only called when there was "clear daylight" between the attacker and the last defender, following proposals from FIFA Chief of Global Football Development, Arsène Wenger. The proposed trial was approved by the IFAB in February 2026. The league also implemented football video support (FVS). To enhance match tempo and reduce time wasting, rules changes such as a five-second countdown on throw-ins and goal kicks, ten seconds to leave the field for a substitution, and a one minute holdout period to return from an injury, were also implemented. The playoff structure was reduced from five to four teams, returning to the format used in 2022.

=== Roster rule changes ===
The CPL's total player compensation budget was increased by $33,500 to a total of $1,217,500 (or $1,337,500 for teams maximizing the U-21 salary incentive). A U-22 salary incentive known as the "U-21 Graduate Provision" was introduced this season. Players who were in their age-22 season and had spent at least two years with their club had only 80% of their salary count towards the compensation budget.

Beginning in 2026, teams could designate a third U-18 domestic player under the Exceptional Young Talent (EYT) rule. Players on EYT contracts did not occupy a roster spot or count towards the player compensation budget.

== Teams ==
Eight teams competed in the 2026 season with the debut of FC Supra du Québec, and the dissolution of Valour FC. Inter Toronto FC played its first season after being renamed, having previously competed as York9 FC and more recently York United FC.

=== Stadiums and locations ===
Location of the 2026 Canadian Premier League teams

| Club | Results | Location | Stadium | Capacity |
|---|---|---|---|---|
| Atlético Ottawa | details | Ottawa, Ontario | TD Place Stadium | 24,000 |
| Cavalry FC | details | Foothills County, Alberta | ATCO Field | 6,000 |
| Forge FC | details | Hamilton, Ontario | Hamilton Stadium | 23,218 |
| HFX Wanderers FC | details | Halifax, Nova Scotia | Wanderers Grounds | 7,500 |
| Inter Toronto FC | details | Toronto, Ontario | York Lions Stadium | 4,000 |
| Pacific FC | details | Langford, British Columbia | Starlight Stadium | 6,000 |
| FC Supra du Québec | details | Laval, Quebec | Stade Boréale | 5,581 |
| Vancouver FC | details | Langley, British Columbia | Willoughby Community Park | 6,560 |

=== Coaching changes ===
| Team | Outgoing coach | Manner of departure | Date of vacancy | Position in table | Incoming coach | Date of appointment |
|---|---|---|---|---|---|---|
| FC Supra du Québec | N/A (inaugural season) | | | Pre-season | (Canada) Nicholas Razzaghi | October 30, 2025 |
| HFX Wanderers FC | (Canada) Patrice Gheisar | Contract expiration | October 24, 2025 | Pre-season | (Italy) Vanni Sartini | December 10, 2025 |
| Pacific FC | (Canada) James Merriman | Sacked | May 21, 2026 | 8th | (Canada) Terry Dunfield | July 7, 2026 |
| Atlético Ottawa | (Mexico) Diego Mejía | Signed by Atlético San Luis | May 31, 2026 | 4th | (Brazil) Gustavo Leal | July 17, 2026 |
| FC Supra du Québec | (Canada) Nicholas Razzaghi | Sacked | September 28, 2026 | 6th | (Canada) Kyt Selaidopoulos | September 28, 2026 |

== Regular season ==
=== Format ===
The regular season was played as a quadruple round-robin, with each team playing the other seven teams twice at home and twice away between April and October. The regular season winner, Cavalry FC, were awarded the CPL Shield and qualified for round one of the 2027 CONCACAF Champions Cup.

The top four clubs advanced to the two-legged semifinals, with the winners advancing to a single championship match.

=== Standings ===
| Pos | Team | Pld | W | D | L | GF | GA | GD | Pts | Qualification |
|---|---|---|---|---|---|---|---|---|---|---|
| 1 | Cavalry FC (S, C) | 28 | 18 | 6 | 4 | 58 | 23 | +35 | 60 | 2027 CONCACAF Champions Cup and Playoffs (Note: As CPL Shield winner) |
| 2 | Forge FC (V) | 28 | 17 | 7 | 4 | 49 | 22 | +27 | 58 | 2027 CONCACAF Champions Cup and Playoffs (Note: As winners of Canadian Championship) |
| 3 | Atlético Ottawa | 28 | 13 | 4 | 11 | 42 | 45 | −3 | 43 | 2027 CONCACAF Champions Cup and Playoffs (Note: As the highest-ranked team not already qualified) |
| 4 | Supra du Québec | 28 | 11 | 5 | 12 | 47 | 50 | −3 | 38 | Playoffs |
| 5 | Vancouver FC | 28 | 10 | 7 | 11 | 39 | 37 | +2 | 37 | |
| 6 | Inter Toronto | 28 | 7 | 9 | 12 | 42 | 65 | −23 | 30 | |
| 7 | HFX Wanderers | 28 | 7 | 7 | 14 | 44 | 50 | −6 | 28 | |
| 8 | Pacific FC | 28 | 2 | 9 | 17 | 33 | 62 | −29 | 15 | |

Source: CPL
Rules for classification: 1) Points; 2) Total wins; 3) Head-to-head; 4) Goal differential; 5) Goals for; 6) Away goal differential; 7) Away goals for; 8) Home goal differential; 9) Home goals for; 10) Fewest disciplinary points; 11) Most under-21 domestic player minutes; 12) Drawing of lots.
(C) Champion; (S) CPL Shield winner; (V) Canadian Championship winners

=== Results ===
| Home \ Away | ATO | CAV | FOR | HFX | ITO | PAC | SUP | VFC |
|---|---|---|---|---|---|---|---|---|
| Atlético Ottawa | | 0–3 | 2–1 | 1–0 | 1–1 | 3–2 | 5–3 | 1–1 |
| Atlético Ottawa | | 3–2 | 1–2 | 2–1 | 2–1 | 0–0 | 0–2 | 4–0 |
| Cavalry | 3–1 | | 2–1 | 2–0 | 1–1 | 3–0 | 2–1 | 1–0 |
| Cavalry | 3–1 | | 1–1 | 1–1 | 5–0 | 4–2 | 6–0 | 1–0 |
| Forge | 2–0 | 0–0 | | 1–0 | 1–1 | 3–0 (Note: Originally scheduled for July 16, but was postponed due to poor air quality from wildfires.) | 1–0 | 3–2 |
| Forge | 3–0 | 1–0 | | 3–3 | 5–0 | 2–0 | 3–2 | 0–1 |
| HFX Wanderers | 1–3 | 2–2 | 1–3 | | 1–1 | 2–2 | 2–3 | 1–0 |
| HFX Wanderers | 0–1 | 1–3 | 0–0 | | 4–1 | 5–2 | 3–4 | 1–0 |
| Inter Toronto | 4–1 | 1–5 | 1–4 | 2–2 | | 3–3 | 1–1 | 1–0 |
| Inter Toronto | 2–1 | 3–1 | 1–3 | 4–3 | | 3–4 | 1–2 | 3–1 |
| Pacific | 2–2 | 1–2 | 0–1 | 1–2 | 0–1 | | 2–3 | 1–3 |
| Pacific | 0–2 | 0–1 | 1–1 | 4–3 | 1–1 | | 1–2 | 1–1 |
| Supra du Québec | 0–1 | 0–1 | 1–2 | 2–1 | 3–1 | 1–1 | | 1–5 |
| Supra du Québec | 1–2 | 1–1 | 1–0 | 0–2 | 3–0 | 5–0 | | 2–2 |
| Vancouver | 2–1 | 0–2 | 0–1 | 0–1 | 4–0 | 2–1 | 1–1 | |
| Vancouver | 3–1 | 1–0 | 1–1 | 2–1 | 3–3 | 1–1 | 3–2 | |

Source: CPL
Legend: Blue = home team win; Yellow = draw; Red = away team win.

=== Positions by week ===
| Team ╲ Week | 1 | 2 | 3 | 4 | 5 | 6 | 7 | 8 | 9 | 10 | 12 | 13 | 15 | 16 | 17 | 18 | 19 | 20 | 21 | 22 | 23 | 24 | 25 | 26 | 27 | 28 | 29 |
|---|---|---|---|---|---|---|---|---|---|---|---|---|---|---|---|---|---|---|---|---|---|---|---|---|---|---|---|
| Atlético Ottawa | 8 | 8 | 6 | 6 | 7 | 4 | 4 | 4 | 4 | 3 | 3 | 3 | 3 | 3 | 4 | 4 | 4 | 3 | 3 | 3 | 3 | 3 | 3 | 3 | 3 | 3 | 3 |
| Cavalry | 2 | 1 | 1 | 2 | 2 | 2 | 1 | 2 | 2 | 2 | 2 | 2 | 2 | 2 | 2 | 2 | 1 | 2 | 1 | 1 | 1 | 1 | 1 | 1 | 2 | 1 | 1 |
| Forge | 1 | 2 | 2 | 1 | 1 | 1 | 2 | 1 | 1 | 1 | 1 | 1 | 1 | 1 | 1 | 1 | 2 | 1 | 2 | 2 | 2 | 2 | 2 | 2 | 1 | 2 | 2 |
| HFX Wanderers | 3 | 3 | 3 | 5 | 5 | 6 | 6 | 6 | 6 | 7 | 4 | 4 | 5 | 5 | 6 | 6 | 7 | 5 | 6 | 6 | 5 | 5 | 5 | 6 | 6 | 6 | 7 |
| Inter Toronto | 4 | 5 | 4 | 4 | 3 | 3 | 3 | 3 | 3 | 4 | 5 | 6 | 6 | 7 | 7 | 7 | 6 | 7 | 7 | 7 | 6 | 7 | 7 | 7 | 7 | 7 | 6 |
| Pacific | 6 | 6 | 7 | 7 | 8 | 8 | 8 | 8 | 8 | 8 | 8 | 8 | 8 | 8 | 8 | 8 | 8 | 8 | 8 | 8 | 8 | 8 | 8 | 8 | 8 | 8 | 8 |
| Supra du Québec | 5 | 4 | 5 | 3 | 4 | 5 | 5 | 5 | 5 | 5 | 6 | 7 | 7 | 6 | 5 | 5 | 5 | 6 | 5 | 5 | 7 | 6 | 6 | 5 | 5 | 5 | 4 |
| Vancouver | 7 | 7 | 8 | 8 | 6 | 7 | 7 | 7 | 7 | 6 | 7 | 5 | 4 | 4 | 3 | 3 | 3 | 3 | 4 | 4 | 4 | 4 | 4 | 4 | 4 | 4 | 5 |

Source: CPL
= Playoffs

== Playoffs ==
The 2026 playoffs featured four teams. There were a pair of two-leg semifinals followed by a single match final hosted by the highest seeded team remaining to crown the league champion, who collected the North Star Cup, and qualified for the 2027 CONCACAF Champions Cup.

In the playoffs, if the aggregate scores were equal at the end of normal time of the second match, or end of the single match for the final, two 15-minute periods of extra time were played with each team allowed an extra substitution. If still tied, the winner was decided by a penalty shoot-out.

Since Cavalry FC qualified for the 2027 CONCACAF Champions Cup as regular season champions, and second-place seeded Forge FC already qualified for the 2027 CONCACAF Champions Cup via the 2026 Canadian Championship, third-placed Atlético Ottawa would get the final berth if either of those teams or Atlético itself won the competition. Since both Atlético Ottawa and Cavalry reached the final, Atlético Ottawa had therefore qualified to the 2027 CONCACAF Champions Cup, regardless of the eventual winner.

=== Bracket ===
Semifinals two-legged tie
1 | Cavalry FC | 1 | 2 | 3
4 | Supra du Québec | 2 | 0 | 2
2 | Forge FC | 2 | 2 | 4
3 | Atlético Ottawa | 2 | 3 | 5

Final single match
November 21
1 | Cavalry FC | 3
3 | Atlético Ottawa | 2

=== Semifinals ===
| Team 1 | Agg. | Team 2 | 1st leg | 2nd leg |
|---|---|---|---|---|
| Atlético Ottawa | 5–4 | Forge FC | 2–2 | 3–2 |
| Supra du Québec | 2–3 | Cavalry FC | 2–1 | 0–2 |

November 1
2:00 pm EST

| Atlético Ottawa | 2–2 | Forge FC |
|---|---|---|
| Gutiérrez 23'; Tabla 43' | Report | Aromatario 15'; Jevremović 35' |

TD Place Stadium, Ottawa, Ontario
Attendance: 6,108
Referee: Mario Al-Ayass
November 7
1:00 pm EST

| Forge FC | 2–3 | Atlético Ottawa |
|---|---|---|
| Massunda 45+5'; Nimick 90+11' (pen.) | Report | Fleuriau Chateau 25', 84', 90+13' |

Hamilton Stadium, Hamilton, Ontario
Attendance: 7,412
Referee: Sebastian Noshinravani

Atlético Ottawa won 5–4 on aggregate.

November 1
4:00 pm EST

| Supra du Québec | 2–1 | Cavalry FC |
|---|---|---|
| Brault-Guillard 4'; Kobza 9' (o.g.) | Report | Warschewski 45+1' |

Stade Boréale, Laval, Quebec
Attendance: 4,432
Referee: Yusri Rudolf
November 7
3:00 pm CST

| Cavalry FC | 2–0 | Supra du Québec |
|---|---|---|
| Elva 25'; Musse 60' | Report |

ATCO Field, Foothills County, Alberta
Attendance: 5,199
Referee: Michael Venne

Cavalry FC won 3–2 on aggregate.

=== Final ===
November 21
2:00 pm CST

| Cavalry FC | 3–2 | Atlético Ottawa |
|---|---|---|
| Warschewski 5', 74'; Camargo 47' | Report | Klomp 65' (o.g.); Fleuriau Chateau 90+11' (pen.) |

ATCO Field, Foothills County, Alberta
Attendance: 9,131
Referee: Renzo Villanueva

== Statistical leaders ==
=== Top scorers ===
| Rank | Nat | Player | Team | Goals |
|---|---|---|---|---|
| 1 | (Canada) | Loïc Kwemi | Supra | 15 |
| 2 | (Canada) | Isaiah Johnston | HFX Wanderers | 11 |
| 2 | (Canada) | Ballou Tabla | Atlético Ottawa | 11 |
| 2 | (Germany) | Tobias Warschewski | Cavalry | 11 |
| 5 | (Canada) | Tomasz Skublak | Inter Toronto | 9 |
| 6 | (Canada) | Julian Altobelli | Inter Toronto | 8 |
| 6 | (Canada) | Marco Bustos | Pacific | 8 |
| 8 | (Burundi) | Mohamed Amissi | Vancouver | 7 |
| 8 | (Canada) | Terran Campbell | Vancouver | 7 |
| 8 | (Canada) | Nicolas Fleuriau Chateau | Atlético Ottawa | 7 |
| 8 | (Somalia) | Ali Musse | Cavalry | 7 |
| 8 | (Canada) | Sean Rea | Supra | 7 |

=== Hat-tricks ===
| Player | For | Against | Result | Date | Ref. |
|---|---|---|---|---|---|
| (Burundi) Mohamed Amissi | Vancouver | Inter Toronto | 4–0 (H) | July 4 | |
| (Canada) Loïc Kwemi | Supra | HFX Wanderers | 3–2 (A) | July 24 | |
| (Somalia) Ali Musse | Cavalry | Supra | 6–0 (H) | September 25 | |

=== Top assists ===
| Rank | Nat | Player | Team | Assists |
|---|---|---|---|---|
| 1 | (Germany) | Tobias Warschewski | Cavalry | 10 |
| 2 | (Spain) | Miguel Arilla | HFX Wanderers | 7 |
| 3 | (Ecuador) | Ariel Almagro | Inter Toronto | 6 |
| 3 | (Canada) | Sean Rea | Supra | 6 |
| 5 | (Canada) | Diyaeddine Abzi | Supra | 5 |
| 5 | (Belgium) | Béni Badibanga | Inter Toronto | 5 |
| 5 | (Canada) | Thierno Bah | Vancouver | 5 |
| 5 | (Canada) | Noah Jensen | Forge | 5 |
| 5 | (Somalia) | Ali Musse | Cavalry | 5 |
| 5 | (Benin) | Goteh Ntignee | Cavalry | 5 |
| 5 | (Ivory Coast) | Yann Toualy | Pacific | 5 |

=== Clean sheets ===
| Rank | Nat | Player | Team | Clean sheets |
|---|---|---|---|---|
| 1 | (Canada) | Nathan Ingham | Cavalry | 11 |
| 2 | (Democratic Republic of the Congo) | Dimitry Bertaud | Forge | 10 |
| 3 | (Canada) | Marco Carducci | HFX Wanderers | 5 |
| 4 | (Canada) | Christopher Kalongo | Atlético Ottawa | 4 |
| 4 | (Canada) | Joakim Milli | Supra | 4 |

== Attendance ==
| Pos | Team | Pld | Total | High | Low | Median | Average | Change |
|---|---|---|---|---|---|---|---|---|
| 1 | HFX Wanderers | 14 | 79,205 | 6,324 | 4,580 | 5,823.5 | 5,658 | −12.4% |
| 2 | Forge FC | 14 | 71,768 | 15,122 | 2,619 | 4,218.5 | 5,126 | −26.0% |
| 3 | Atlético Ottawa | 14 | 60,022 | 5,259 | 3,181 | 4,464.5 | 4,287 | −8.9% |
| 4 | Cavalry FC | 14 | 55,217 | 5,009 | 3,001 | 3,925 | 3,944 | −7.6% |
| 5 | Supra du Québec | 14 | 38,929 | 5,322 | 1,515 | 2,211 | 2,781 | n/a |
| 6 | Pacific FC | 14 | 37,225 | 3,507 | 2,067 | 2,529 | 2,659 | −10.2% |
| 7 | Vancouver FC | 14 | 28,374 | 3,528 | 1,208 | 1,867.5 | 2,027 | +45.9% |
| 8 | Inter Toronto | 14 | 28,155 | 3,256 | 1,025 | 1,713 | 2,011 | −2.1% |
| | League total | 112 | 398,895 | 15,122 | 1,025 | 3,429.5 | 3,562 | −10.9% |

Source: CPL, FotMob, LeonardFC

== Awards ==
=== Monthly awards ===
| Month | Manager of the Month | | Player of the Month | | Goalkeeper of the Month | | U-21 Player of the Month | | References |
| Month | Manager | Club | Player | Club | Player | Club | Player | Club | References |
|---|---|---|---|---|---|---|---|---|---|
| April | (Canada) Bobby Smyrniotis | Forge FC | (Canada) Sean Rea | FC Supra du Québec | (Democratic Republic of the Congo) Dimitry Bertaud | Forge FC | (Canada) Alessandro Biello | FC Supra du Québec | |
| May | (England) Tommy Wheeldon Jr. | Cavalry FC | (Germany) Tobias Warschewski | Cavalry FC | (Mexico) Diego Urtiaga | Inter Toronto FC | (Canada) Adam Pearlman | Cavalry FC | |
| June | (Canada) Martin Nash | Vancouver FC | (Benin) Goteh Ntignee | Cavalry FC | (Democratic Republic of the Congo) Dimitry Bertaud | Forge FC | (Canada) Kian Proctor | Vancouver FC | |
| July | (Canada) Martin Nash | Vancouver FC | (Canada) Ballou Tabla | Atlético Ottawa | (Canada) Christopher Kalongo | Atlético Ottawa | (Canada) Kian Proctor | Vancouver FC | |
| August | (Brazil) Gustavo Leal | Atlético Ottawa | (Canada) Nicolas Fleuriau Chateau | Atlético Ottawa | (Canada) Callum Irving | Vancouver FC | (Canada) Aghilas Sadek | Forge FC | |
| September | (England) Tommy Wheeldon Jr. | Cavalry FC | (Canada) Isaiah Johnston | HFX Wanderers FC | (Canada) Nathan Ingham | Cavalry FC | (Canada) Adam Pearlman | Cavalry FC | |
| October | (Canada) Kyt Selaidopoulos | FC Supra du Québec | (Canada) Loïc Kwemi | FC Supra du Québec | (Canada) Dino Bontis | Forge FC | (Canada) Alessandro Biello | FC Supra du Québec | |

=== Team of the Week ===
Players of the week are in bold.

| Week | Team of the Week | | | | Ref. |
| Week | Goalkeeper | Defenders | Midfielders | Forwards | Ref. |
|---|---|---|---|---|---|
| 1 | (Canada) **Carducci** (HFX) | (Canada) Paton (Forge); (Canada) Alphonse (HFX); (France) Batisse (Forge); (Canada) Doner (Vancouver) | (Canada) Borges (Forge); (Canada) Paton (Cavalry); (France) Callegari (HFX) | (Germany) Warschewski (Cavalry); (Canada) Wright (Forge); (New Zealand) Herdman (Cavalry) | |
| 2 | (Democratic Republic of the Congo) Bertaud (Forge) | (Canada) Abzi (Supra); (Canada) Sow (HFX); (Netherlands) Klomp (Cavalry); (Albania) Rama (Forge) | (Canada) Rea (Supra); (Canada) Camargo (Cavalry); (Canada) Paton (Cavalry); (Canada) Bustos (Pacific) | (Canada) **Altobelli** (Toronto); (Canada) Kwemi (Supra) | |
| 3 | (Haiti) **Innocent** (Ottawa) | (Serbia) Jevremović (Forge); (Trinidad and Tobago) Singh (Toronto); (Canada) Nimick (Forge); (Netherlands) Konincks (Pacific); (Canada) Pearlman (Cavalry) | (Canada) Rea (Supra); (Canada) Biello (Supra); (Canada) Johnston (HFX); (Lebanon) Bitar (Toronto) | (Tanzania) Kachwele (HFX) | |
| 4 | (Mexico) Urtiaga (Toronto) | (Haiti) Auguste (Supra); (Netherlands) Klomp (Cavalry); (Canada) Chrétien (Supra); (Canada) Doner (Vancouver) | (Canada) **Rea** (Supra); (Canada) Aromatario (Forge); (Canada) Johnston (HFX) | (Canada) Skublak (Toronto); (Burundi) Amissi (Vancouver); (Somalia) Musse (Cavalry) | |
| 5 | (Democratic Republic of the Congo) Bertaud (Forge) | (Canada) Córdova (Toronto); (Netherlands) Klomp (Cavalry); (France) Batisse (Forge); (Canada) Doner (Vancouver) | (Trinidad and Tobago) Yeates (Toronto); (Canada) Kobza (Cavalry) | (Canada) **Skublak** (Toronto); (Canada) Campbell (Vancouver); (Burundi) Amissi (Vancouver); (Canada) Massunda (Forge) | |
| 6 | (Mexico) **Urtiaga** (Toronto) | (Mexico) Aguilar (Ottawa); (Canada) Nimick (Forge); (Mexico) López (Toronto); (Albania) Rama (Forge) | (Benin) Ntignee (Cavalry); (Mexico) Villal (Ottawa); (Canada) Kobza (Cavalry); (Canada) Aparicio (Ottawa) | (Peru) Gonzales (Toronto); (Germany) Warschewski (Cavalry) | |
| 7 | (Canada) Carducci (HFX) | (Canada) Coulanges (Ottawa); (Canada) Abatneh (Ottawa); (Canada) Didić (Cavalry); (Canada) Pearlman (Cavalry) | (Canada) Camargo (Cavalry); (Mexico) Castro (Ottawa); (Canada) Johnston (HFX) | (Canada) Altobelli (Toronto); (Burundi) Amissi (Vancouver); (Germany) **Warschewski** (Cavalry) | |
| 8 | (Canada) Carducci (HFX) | (Canada) Abzi (Supra); (France) Batisse (Forge); (Canada) Nimick (Forge); (England) Laing (Cavalry) | (Canada) Rea (Supra); (Mexico) Castro (Ottawa); (Canada) Mlah (Supra); (France) Callegari (HFX) | (Canada) **Kratt** (Pacific); (Canada) Choinière (Supra) | |
| 9 | (Canada) Ingham (Cavalry) | (Canada) Proctor (Vancouver); (Netherlands) Klomp (Cavalry); (Canada) Pearlman (Cavalry) | (Canada) Rea (Supra); (Canada) Aromatario (Forge); (Canada) **Borges** (Forge); (Canada) Paton (Forge) | (France) Mousset (Vancouver); (Benin) Ntignee (Cavalry); (Canada) Massunda (Forge) | |
| 10 | (Democratic Republic of the Congo) Bertaud (Forge) | (Canada) Proctor (Vancouver); (Canada) Nimick (Forge); (Canada) Alphonse (HFX); (Canada) Coulanges (Ottawa) | (Canada) Camargo (Cavalry); (Canada) Pecile (Vancouver); (Canada) Aparicio (Ottawa) | (Germany) Warschewski (Cavalry); (Benin) **Ntignee** (Cavalry); (Mexico) García (Ottawa) | |
| 11 | (Canada) Kalongo (Ottawa) | (Netherlands) Krutzen (Forge); (France) Batisse (Forge); (Canada) Kozlovskiy (Ottawa) | (Canada) Bah (Vancouver); (Canada) Johnston (HFX); (Canada) Borges (Forge); (Brazil) Antinoro (Ottawa) | (Canada) Ciccarelli (HFX); (Canada) **Tabla** (Ottawa); (Spain) Arilla (HFX) | |
| 12 | (Canada) Carducci (HFX) | (Canada) Proctor (Vancouver); (Canada) Campagna (Vancouver); (Canada) Nimick (Forge); (Canada) Pearlman (Cavalry) | (Benin) Ntignee (Cavalry); (Canada) Paton (Forge); (France) Callegari (HFX); (Canada) Bah (Vancouver) | (Burundi) **Amissi** (Vancouver); (Saint Lucia) Elva (Cavalry) | |
| 13 | (Mexico) Urtiaga (Toronto) | (Canada) Proctor (Vancouver); (Equatorial Guinea) Mbomio (Ottawa); (Canada) Campagna (Vancouver); (Canada) Doner (Vancouver) | (Belgium) Badibanga (Toronto); (Canada) **Pecile** (Vancouver); (Canada) Johnston (HFX) | (France) Mousset (Vancouver); (Germany) Warschewski (Cavalry); (Canada) Tabla (Ottawa) | |
| 14 | (Canada) Kalongo (Ottawa) | (Serbia) Jevremović (Forge); (Republic of Ireland) Field (Vancouver); (Canada) Campagna (Vancouver); (Haiti) Auguste (Supra) | (Ghana) Ampomah (Forge); (Canada) Aromatario (Forge); (Canada) Pecile (Vancouver) | (France) Mousset (Vancouver); (Canada) **Kwemi** (Supra); (Canada) Tabla (Ottawa) | |
| 15 | (Canada) Holliday (Cavalry) | (Albania) Rama (Forge); (Canada) Meilleur-Giguère (HFX); (Canada) Didić (Cavalry); (Canada) Pearlman (Cavalry) | (Canada) Edwards (Cavalry); (Canada) Kobza (Cavalry); (Canada) Pecile (Vancouver) | (France) Mousset (Vancouver); (Germany) Warschewski (Cavalry); (Burundi) Amissi (Vancouver) | |
| 16 | (Canada) **Irving** (Vancouver) | (Canada) Lebeuf (Supra); (Trinidad and Tobago) Singh (Toronto); (Republic of Ireland) Field (Vancouver); (Equatorial Guinea) Mbomio (Ottawa) | (France) Arnaud (Ottawa); (Canada) Mlah (Supra); (Canada) Pecile (Vancouver) | (Canada) Bah (Vancouver); (Mexico) García (Ottawa); (Ivory Coast) Toualy (Pacific) | |
| 17 | (Canada) Irving (Vancouver) | (Netherlands) Klomp (Cavalry); (Colombia) Quintana (Pacific); (Canada) Didić (Cavalry) | (Ecuador) **Almagro** (Toronto); (Canada) Paton (Cavalry); (Canada) Johnston (HFX); (Canada) Mlah (Supra) | (Canada) Fleuriau Chateau (Ottawa); (Lebanon) Khoury (Ottawa); (Canada) Altobelli (Toronto) | |
| 18 | (Canada) Pavela (Toronto) | (Canada) Bourgeois (Forge); (New Zealand) Linder (HFX); (Canada) Nimick (Forge); (Canada) Pearlman (Cavalry) | (France) Batisse (Forge); (Canada) Habibullah (Ottawa); (Canada) Assi (Ottawa) | (Canada) Sadek (Forge); (Canada) Fleuriau Chateau (Ottawa); (Germany) **Warschewski** (Cavalry) | |
| 19 | (Canada) Ingham (Cavalry) | (Equatorial Guinea) Mbomio (Ottawa); (Canada) Chrétien (Supra); (Netherlands) Konincks (Pacific); (France) Kamdem Fewo (Cavalry) | (Australia) Gomulka (Pacific); (Mali) Sissoko (Supra); (Brazil) Antinoro (Ottawa) | (Canada) Kwemi (Supra); (Canada) Tabla (Ottawa); (Ivory Coast) **Toualy** (Pacific) | |

== Player transfers ==
=== CPL–U Sports Draft ===
The 2026 CPL–U Sports Draft took place on November 28, 2025. Sixteen Canadian university student-athletes were selected by Canadian Premier League clubs over two rounds.

=== Foreign players ===
Canadian Premier League teams can sign a maximum of seven international players, out of which only five can be in the starting line-up for each match.

The following international players were signed for the 2026 season. To be considered domestic for CPL purposes, players must be Canadian citizens, permanent residents, refugees, or foreign players with at least three seasons spent in the league. Note that domestic players may still hold other nationalities or represent other countries in international competitions.

| Club | Player 1 | Player 2 | Player 3 | Player 4 | Player 5 | Player 6 | Player 7 | Inactive players (Note: Players who remain under contract but have suffered season-ending injury and may not return to play. They do not count towards roster or cap restrictions and as such can be replaced by another foreign player.) | Former players |
|---|---|---|---|---|---|---|---|---|---|
| Atlético Ottawa | (Mexico) Juan Castro | (Equatorial Guinea) **Roni Mbomio** | (Mexico) Jonantan Villal | (Mexico) Emiliano García | (Mexico) Daniel Aguilar | (Mexico) Amaury Escoto | | | (Haiti) **Garissone Innocent** (Norway) Erling Myklebust |
| Cavalry | (England) Levi Laing | (United States) Curtis Ofori | (Tunisia) Hassan Ayari | | | | | | |
| Forge | (Ghana) **Nana Opoku Ampomah** | (Albania) Rezart Rama | (Serbia) **Marko Jevremović** | (Spain) Ismael Oketokoun | (France) Antoine Batisse | (Democratic Republic of the Congo) **Dimitry Bertaud** | (Haiti) **Woodensky Pierre** | | |
| HFX Wanderers | (France) Yohan Baï | (Republic of the Congo) **Jason Bahamboula** | (Spain) Miguel Arilla | (Netherlands) Sven Zitman | (England) Victor Akinwale | (Haiti) Nelson Pierre | | | (Tanzania) **Cyprian Kachwele** |
| Inter Toronto | (Mexico) Oswaldo León | (Mexico) **Raúl López** | (Ecuador) Ariel Almagro | (Belgium) Béni Badibanga | (Peru) Sebastián Gonzales | (Mexico) Carlos Guzmán | | | (Mexico) Diego Urtiaga |
| Pacific | (Colombia) Juan Quintana | (Sweden) Lukas Browning Lagerfeldt | (Netherlands) Diego Konincks | (Australia) Taras Gomulka | | | | | (South Sudan) Bul Juach |
| FC Supra | (United States) Jack McInerney | | | | | | | | |
| Vancouver | (France) Abdoulaye Ouattara | (New Zealand) Luis Toomey | (Burundi) **Mohamed Amissi** | (Sweden) Isak Ssewankambo | (France) Lys Mousset | (Brazil) Vitor Lucas | (Ivory Coast) Aboubacar Traore | | (Brazil) Michel Cavalcante |

Players in italic denote players who were new to their respective clubs for the 2026 season, sorted chronologically by their announcement. Players in bold indicate players who have represented their national teams at the senior level.
