= 2026 Atlético Ottawa season =

Atlético Ottawa
2026 season
- CEO: Manuel Vega
- Head coach: Gustavo Leal
- Stadium: TD Place Stadium
- Canadian Premier League: 3rd
- CPL Playoffs: Semifinals
- Canadian Championship: Quarterfinals

The 2026 Atlético Ottawa season is the seventh season in the history of Atlético Ottawa. In addition to the Canadian Premier League, the club will compete in the Canadian Championship, as well as in the CONCACAF Champions Cup, following their first North Star Cup win in the previous season.

On May 23, head coach Diego Mejía was hired by Liga MX club Atlético San Luis. He was replaced by Gustavo Leal, who was announced as Atlético's new head coach on July 15.

== Current squad ==
As of September 15, 2026

| No. | Name | Nationality | Position(s) | Date of birth (age) | Previous club | Notes |
Goalkeepers
| 1 | Tristan Crampton | (Canada) | GK | July 10, 2002 (age 24) | (Canada) OSU Atlético | |
| 31 | Christopher Kalongo | (Canada) | GK | January 7, 2002 (age 24) | (Canada) Toronto FC II | |
Defenders
| 3 | Julian Dunn | (Canada) | CB | July 11, 2000 (age 26) | (Canada) Halifax Wanderers | |
| 4 | Tyr Duhaney-Walker | (Canada) | CB / FB | October 22, 2003 (age 23) | (Canada) Acadia University | |
| 18 | Roni Mbomio | (Equatorial Guinea) | RB / CB | May 3, 2005 (aged 20) | (Spain) Atlético Madrid C | INT |
| 20 | Joaquim Coulanges | (Canada) | LB / LW | November 3, 2006 (age 20) | (Canada) CF Montréal Academy | U21 |
| 23 | Noah Abatneh | (Canada) | RB / CB | September 28, 2004 (age 22) | (Canada) York United | |
| 27 | Wesley Timoteo | (Canada) | FB / RW / LW | April 9, 2000 (age 26) | (Canada) HFX Wanderers | |
| 28 | Loïc Cloutier | (Canada) | CB | April 26, 2004 (age 22) | (Canada) OSU Atlético | |
| 84 | Sergei Kozlovskiy | (Canada) | LB / CB | June 18, 2008 (age 18) | (Canada) CF Montréal Academy | U21, EYT |
| 91 | Luca Levillain | (Canada) | CB | April 8, 2008 (age 18) | (Canada) Ottawa South United | U21, DEV |
Midfielders
| 2 | Juan Castro | (Mexico) | CM / DM | December 21, 1991 (age 34) | (Mexico) Atlético San Luis | INT |
| 5 | Daniel Aguilar | (Mexico) | DM / AM | February 6, 1998 (age 28) | (Venezuela) Caracas F.C. | INT |
| 6 | Diego Gutiérrez | (Canada) | RM / RB | February 18, 1997 (age 29) | (Cambodia) Phnom Penh Crown | |
| 8 | Jonantan Villal | (Mexico) | AM | January 6, 2005 (age 21) | (Mexico) Atlético San Luis | INT, Loan |
| 10 | Manny Aparicio | (Canada) | CM | September 17, 1995 (age 31) | (Canada) Pacific FC | |
| 11 | Gabriel Antinoro | (Brazil) | LW | April 24, 2004 (age 22) | (Canada) CF Montréal | |
| 14 | Jean-Aniel Assi | (Canada) | LW / RW | August 12, 2004 (age 22) | (Spain) Alcorcón B | |
| 16 | Jason Hartill | (Canada) | MF | January 16, 2004 (age 22) | (Canada) Cape Breton University | U-S |
| 30 | Kamron Habibullah | (Canada) | CM / LW | October 23, 2003 (age 23) | (Sweden) Sandvikens IF | |
| 37 | Tim Arnaud | (France) | DM / CM | | (Canada) CF Montréal Academy | |
Forwards
| 7 | Emiliano García | (Mexico) | CF | November 25, 2003 (age 22) | (Mexico) Atlético San Luis | INT, Loan |
| 9 | Amaury Escoto | (Mexico) | CF | November 30, 1992 (age 33) | (Mexico) Tepatitlán | INT |
| 13 | Ballou Tabla | (Canada) | CF / RW / LW | March 31, 1999 (age 27) | (Turkey) Manisa FK | |
| 17 | Richie Ennin | (Canada) | CF / RW / LW | September 17, 1998 (age 28) | (Hungary) MTK Budapest FC | IL |
| 19 | Ralph Khoury | (Lebanon) | CF | May 9, 2007 (age 19) | (Canada) Ottawa South United | U21 |
| 21 | Nicolas Fleuriau Chateau | (Canada) | CF | May 21, 2002 (age 24) | (Republic of Ireland) Galway United | |
| 77 | Reinaldo Abraham | (Canada) | CF | | (Canada) Toronto FC Academy | U21, EYT |

== Transfers ==
=== In ===
| No. | Pos. | Player | From club | Fee/notes | Date | Source |
|---|---|---|---|---|---|---|
| | MF | (Canada) Marko Stojadinovic | (Canada) Toronto FC II | Free | December 18, 2025 | |
| | MF | (France) Tim Arnaud | (Canada) CF Montréal Academy | Free | January 12, 2026 | |
| 18 | DF | (Equatorial Guinea) Roni Mbomio | (Spain) Atlético Madrid | Free | January 13, 2026 | |
| | GK | (Haiti) Garissone Innocent | (Lithuania) FK Riteriai | Free | January 16, 2026 | |
| | MF | (Mexico) Daniel Aguilar | (Venezuela) Caracas F.C. | Free | February 6, 2026 | |
| | MF | (Canada) Kamron Habibullah | (Sweden) Sandvikens IF | Free | February 12, 2026 | |
| | FW | (Norway) Erling Myklebust | (Norway) Åsane Fotball | Free | February 13, 2026 | |
| | DF | (Canada) Wesley Timoteo | (Canada) HFX Wanderers | Free | March 25, 2026 | |
| | GK | (Canada) Christopher Kalongo | (Canada) Toronto FC II | Free | May 24, 2026 | |
| | DF | (Canada) Julian Dunn | (Canada) Halifax Wanderers | Free | June 30, 2026 | |
| 21 | FW | (Canada) Nicolas Fleuriau Chateau | (Republic of Ireland) Galway United | Free | July 24, 2026 | |
| | MF | (Canada) Diego Gutiérrez | (Cambodia) Phnom Penh Crown | Free | July 30, 2026 | |
| | DF | (Canada) Luca Levillain | (Canada) Ottawa South United | Signed to Development contract | August 16, 2026 | |
| | FW | (Mexico) Amaury Escoto | (Mexico) Tepatitlán | Free | September 15, 2026 | |
| | FW | (Canada) Reinaldo Abraham | (Canada) Toronto FC Academy | Free; signed to Exceptional Young Talent contract | September 17, 2026 | |

==== Loans in ====
| No. | Pos. | Player | From club | Fee/notes | Date | Source |
|---|---|---|---|---|---|---|
| | MF | (Mexico) Jonantan Villal | (Mexico) Atlético San Luis | Season-long loan | February 4, 2026 | |
| | FW | (Mexico) Emiliano García | (Mexico) Atlético San Luis | Season-long loan | February 4, 2026 | |
| | FW | (Canada) Santiago López | (Mexico) Pumas UNAM | Loaned until July 2026 | April 16, 2026 | |

==== Draft picks ====
Atlético Ottawa selected the following players in the 2026 CPL–U Sports Draft. Draft picks are not automatically signed to the team roster. Only those who are signed to a contract will be listed as transfers in.

| Round | Selection | Pos. | Player | Nationality | University |
|---|---|---|---|---|---|
| 1 | 9 | MF | Gabriel Tardif | Canada | Brock |
| 2 | 16 | MF | Joseph Daher | Canada | Carleton |

=== Out ===
==== Transferred out ====
| No. | Pos. | Player | To club | Fee/notes | Date | Source |
|---|---|---|---|---|---|---|
| 7 | MF | (United States) David Rodríguez | (Mexico) Atlético San Luis | Loan ended | November 9, 2025 | |
| 6 | MF | (Mexico) Kevin Ortega | (Mexico) Atlético San Luis | Loan ended | November 9, 2025 | |
| 24 | MF | (Mexico) Antonio Álvarez | (Mexico) Club América | Loan ended | November 9, 2025 | |
| 18 | DF | (Equatorial Guinea) Roni Mbomio | (Spain) Atlético Madrid | Loan ended | November 9, 2025 | |
| 29 | GK | (Canada) Nathan Ingham | (Canada) Cavalry FC | Contract expired | December 31, 2025 | |
| 55 | DF | (Canada) Amer Didic | (Canada) Cavalry FC | Contract expired | December 31, 2025 | |
| 8 | MF | (Canada) Noah Verhoeven | (Greece) Makedonikos | Contract expired | December 31, 2025 | |
| 21 | MF | (Spain) Alberto Zapater | Retired | Contract expired | December 31, 2025 | |
| 33 | MF | (Mali) Aboubacar Sissoko | (Canada) FC Supra | Contract expired | December 31, 2025 | |
| 9 | FW | (Canada) Samuel Salter | (Sweden) GAIS | Contract expired | December 31, 2025 | |
| 19 | FW | (Portugal) Kevin dos Santos | (Republic of Ireland) Derry City | Contract expired | December 31, 2025 | |
| 12 | FW | (New Zealand) Monty Patterson | | Contract terminated by mutual agreement | December 31, 2025 | |
| 17 | DF | (Canada) Brett Levis | Retired | | January 25, 2026 | |
| 6 | MF | (Canada) Marko Stojadinovic | | Contract terminated by mutual agreement | May 20, 2026 | |
| 75 | GK | (Haiti) Garissone Innocent | | Contract terminated by mutual agreement | June 30, 2026 | |
| | FW | (Canada) Santiago López | | Loan ended | July 2, 2026 | |
| 9 | FW | (Norway) Erling Myklebust | | Contract terminated by mutual agreement | July 30, 2026 | |

== Canadian Premier League ==
=== Regular season ===
| April 4 1 | Forge FC | 2–0 | Atlético Ottawa | Hamilton, Ontario |
| 12:00 EDT (UTC-04:00) | Wright 21' (pen.); Paton 68'; Aromatario (yellow card) 73' | Report | Castro (yellow card) 56'; Aparicio (yellow card) 61'; Duhaney-Walker (yellow card) 65' | Stadium: Hamilton Stadium; Referee: Yusri Rudolf |

| April 12 2 | Cavalry FC | 3–1 | Atlético Ottawa | Foothills County, Alberta |
| 14:00 MDT (UTC-06:00) | Klomp 17'; Paton 22' (yellow card) 24'; Pearlman (yellow card) 45+3'; Ntignee 67'; Camargo (yellow card) 76' | Report | Habibullah 88' | Stadium: ATCO Field; Referee: Michael Venne |

| April 19 3 | FC Supra | 0–1 | Atlético Ottawa | Montreal, Quebec |
| 14:00 EDT (UTC-04:00) | Chretien (yellow card) 36'; Aboubacar Sissoko (yellow card) 78' | Report | Kozlovskiy (yellow card) 48'; Duhaney-Walker 90+3' | Stadium: Stade du CEPSUM; Referee: Mario Alayass |

| April 26 4 | Atlético Ottawa | 1–1 | Vancouver FC | Ottawa, Ontario |
| 13:00 EDT (UTC-04:00) | García 90+7' | Report | Polisi (yellow card) 21'; Toomey (yellow card) 45+4'; Amissi 61' (yellow card) 72' | Stadium: TD Place Stadium; Attendance: 5,259; Referee: Renzo Villanueva |

| May 1 5 | Inter Toronto | 4–1 | Atlético Ottawa | Toronto, Ontario |
| 19:30 EDT (UTC-04:00) | Singh (yellow card) 27'; Skublak 50', 55'; Cloutier 61' (o.g.); Altobelli 63' | Report | Aparicio (yellow card) 80'; Timoteo 84'; Aguilar (yellow card) 89'; Antinoro (yellow card) 90+2'; Kozlovskiy (yellow card) 90+5' | Stadium: York Lions Stadium; Referee: Sebastian Noshinravani |

| May 17 6 | Atlético Ottawa | 1–0 | HFX Wanderers | Ottawa, Ontario |
| 13:00 EDT (UTC-04:00) | Villal 31' (yellow card) 90+4'; Aguilar (yellow card) 46' | Report | Godinho (yellow card) 28'; Sow (yellow card) 45+1'; Arilla (yellow card) 89' | Stadium: TD Place Stadium; Attendance: 5,061; Referee: Renzo Villaneuva |

| May 24 7 | Atlético Ottawa | 2–1 | Forge FC | Ottawa, Ontario |
| 14:00 EDT (UTC-04:00) | Aparicio (yellow card) 43'; Abatneh 67'; Coulanges 87' | Report | Aromatario (yellow card) 56'; Oketokoun 84' | Stadium: TD Place Stadium; Referee: Fabrizio Stasolla |

| May 30 8 | Pacific FC | 2–2 | Atlético Ottawa | Langford, British Columbia |
| 15:00 PT (UTC-07:00) | Kratt 13'; Belluz (yellow card) 17' (yellow-red card) 89'; Toualy 50'; Juach (yellow card) 90+9' | Report | García (yellow card) 69'; Cloutier 78'; Tabla 90+11' (pen.) | Stadium: Starlight Stadium; Referee: Iwan-Nikita Jecanski |

| June 5 9 | Vancouver FC | 2-1 | Atlético Ottawa | Langley, British Columbia |
| 19:00 PT (UTC-07:00) | Campbell 14'; Mousset 35'; Field (yellow card) 86' | Report | Timoteo (yellow card) 31'; Tabla 73'; Aparicio (yellow card) 83'; Aguilar (yellow card) 86'; Antinoro (red card) 90+7' | Stadium: Willoughby Stadium; Referee: Mathieu Souaré |

| June 9 10 | Atlético Ottawa | 5-3 | FC Supra | Ottawa, Ontario |
| 19:00 EDT (UTC-04:00) | Assi 29'; Aparicio 48'; Tabla 68'; García 79', 90+8' | Report | Rea 3'; Boughanmi 38'; Kwemi 44' | Stadium: TD Place Stadium; Referee: Ben Hoskins |

| July 1 11 | HFX Wanderers | 1-3 | Atlético Ottawa | Halifax, Nova Scotia |
| 16:00 ADT (UTC-03:00) | Ciccarelli 68'; Godinho (yellow card) 76' | Report | Tabla 3', 36' (pen.); Antinoro 26'; Kozlovskiy (yellow card) 56' | Stadium: Wanderers Grounds; Referee: Yusri Rudolf |

| July 4 12 | Atlético Ottawa | 0–3 | Cavalry FC | Ottawa, Ontario |
| 16:00 EDT (UTC-04:00) | Khoury (yellow card) 80'; Castro (yellow card) 86' | Report | Ntignee (yellow card) 20', (goal) 17'; Camargo 9'; Elva 39'; Kamdem (yellow card) 45+4'; Paton (yellow card) 53'; Ingham (yellow card) 84' | Stadium: TD Place Stadium; Referee: Carly Shaw-MacLaren |

| July 17 13 | Atlético Ottawa | 1–1 | Inter Toronto | Ottawa, Ontario |
| 19:00 EDT (UTC-04:00) | Tabla 54'; Dunn (yellow card) 84'; Assi (yellow card) 85'; Khoury (yellow card) 90+1' | Report | Skublak (yellow card) 33'; Altobelli (yellow card) 38', (goal) 56' | Stadium: TD Place Stadium; Referee: Ben Hoskins |

| July 26 14 | Atlético Ottawa | 3-2 | Pacific FC | Ottawa, Ontario |
| 14:00 EDT (UTC-04:00) | Timotéo (yellow card) 38'; Cloutier (yellow card) 45+3'; García 45+6'; Tabla 76'; Antinoro (yellow card) 90'; Castro (yellow card) 90+4'; Chateau 90+6' | Report | Díaz 53' (pen.); Heard (yellow card) 56'; Bustos 61' | Stadium: TD Place Stadium; Referee: Renzo Villanueva |

| August 1 15 | Vancouver FC | 3-1 | Atlético Ottawa | Langley, British Columbia |
| 15:00 PDT (UTC-07:00) | Amissi 7'; Mousset 14' (pen.); Pecile 45+2'; Ouattara (yellow card) 58'; Field (yellow card) 90+3' | Report | Arnaud 50'; Tabla (yellow card) 78'; Aguilar (yellow card) 84'; Habibullah (yellow card) 85' | Stadium: Willoughby Stadium; Referee: Roberto D'Alesio |

| August 8 16 | Atlético Ottawa | 2-1 | HFX Wanderers | Ottawa, Ontario |
| | García 62'; Tabla 79'; Cloutier (yellow card) 90+4' | | Alphonse (yellow card) 35'; Arilla 39'; Zitman (yellow card) 53'; Olguin (yellow card) 56'; Linder (yellow card) 78'; Sow (yellow card) 90+1' | Stadium: TD Place Stadium; Referee: Mathieu Souaré |

| August 16 17 | FC Supra | 1-2 | Atlético Ottawa | Montreal, Quebec |
| | Chrétien (yellow card) 51' (yellow-red card) 90+2'; Mlah (yellow card) 61' (goal) 64'; Sissoko (yellow card) 80' | | Fleuriau Chateau 83'; Khoury 90'; Tabla (yellow card) 90+6' | Stadium: Complexe Sportif Claude-Robillard; Referee: Scott Bowman |

| August 19 18 | Atlético Ottawa | 4-0 | Vancouver FC | Ottawa, Ontario |
| | | | | Stadium: TD Place Stadium |

| August 22 19 | Cavalry FC | 3-1 | Atlético Ottawa | Foothills County, Alberta |
| | | | | Stadium: ATCO Field |

| August 28 20 | Atlético Ottawa | 2-1 | Inter Toronto | Ottawa, Ontario |
| | | | | Stadium: TD Place Stadium |

| September 5 21 | Atlético Ottawa | 0-0 | Pacific FC | Ottawa, Ontario |
| | | | | Stadium: TD Place Stadium |

| September 12 22 | Forge FC | 3-0 | Atlético Ottawa | Hamilton, Ontario |
| | | | | Stadium: Hamilton Stadium |

| September 20 23 | Atlético Ottawa | 0-2 | FC Supra | Ottawa, Ontario |
| | | | | Stadium: TD Place Stadium |

| September 26 24 | HFX Wanderers | 0-1 | Atlético Ottawa | Halifax, Nova Scotia |
| | | | | Stadium: Wanderers Grounds |

| September 30 25 | Atlético Ottawa | 3-2 | Cavalry FC | Ottawa, Ontario |
| | | | | Stadium: TD Place Stadium |

| October 11 26 | Pacific FC | 0-2 | Atlético Ottawa | Victoria, British Columbia |
| | | | | Stadium: Royal Athletic Park |

| October 17 27 | Atlético Ottawa | 1-2 | Forge FC | Ottawa, Ontario |
| | | | | Stadium: TD Place Stadium |

| October 25 28 | Inter Toronto | 2-1 | Atlético Ottawa | Toronto, Ontario |
| | | | | Stadium: York Lions Stadium |

== Playoff matches ==
| November 1 SF Leg 1 | Atlético Ottawa | 2–2 | Forge FC | Ottawa, Ontario |
| 2:00 pm EST | Gutiérrez 23'; Tabla 43' | Report | Aromatario 15'; Jevremović 35' | Stadium: TD Place Stadium; Attendance: 6,108; Referee: Mario Al-Ayass |

| November 7 SF Leg 2 | Forge FC | 2–3 (4–5 agg.) | Atlético Ottawa | Hamilton, Ontario |
| 1:00 pm EST | Massunda 45+5'; Nimick 90+11' (pen.) | Report | Fleuriau Chateau 25', 84', 90+13' | Stadium: Hamilton Stadium; Attendance: 7,412; Referee: Sebastian Noshinravani |

| November 21 Final | Cavalry FC | v | Atlético Ottawa | Foothills County, Alberta |
| 2:00pm CST | | Report | | Stadium: ATCO Field |

== Canadian Championship ==
Atlético Ottawa entered in the first round, drawn away to MLS side Toronto FC.

=== Preliminary Round ===
| May 5 Preliminary Round | Toronto FC | 1–3 | Atlético Ottawa | Toronto, Ontario |
| 19:30 EDT (UTC-04:00) | Kerr 16'; Etienne (yellow card) 68'; Coello (yellow card) 90+5' | Report | Aguilar (yellow card) 40'; García (yellow card) 54'; Antinoro (yellow card) 56'; Tabla 71', 81', 90+6' (pen.) | Stadium: BMO Stadium; Referee: Scott Bowman |

=== Quarterfinals ===
| July 8 First leg | FC Supra | 3–1 | Atlético Ottawa | Laval, QC |
| 19:00 EDT (UTC-04:00) | Choinière 29'; Rea 50'; Bey (yellow card) 77'; Condé 83', (yellow card) 90+6'; Auguste (yellow card) 88' | Report | Aparicio (yellow card) 75'; Timóteo 86'; Kozlovskiy (yellow card) 90+6' | Stadium: Stade Boréale; Attendance: 1,718; Referee: Sebastian Noshinravani |

| August 11 Second leg | Atlético Ottawa | 3-3 (4-6 agg.) | FC Supra | Ottawa, ON |
| --:-- PM EDT | | | | Stadium: TD Place Stadium |

== CONCACAF Champions Cup ==
As the 2025 Canadian Premier League Champions, Atlético Ottawa entered the competition in the first round, playing a home-and-away series against MLS side Nashville SC. Their debut would end early as they would be bounced in the first round, not having scored a single goal in across their two matches.

=== Round One ===
| February 17, 2026 | Atlético Ottawa (Canada) | 0–2 | (United States) Nashville SC | Hamilton, Ontario |
| 20:00 EDT (UTC-04:00) | | Report | Pacius 66'; Surridge 90+5' | Stadium: Hamilton Stadium; Attendance: 290; Referee: Steven Madrigal (Costa Rica) |

| February 24, 2026 | Nashville SC (United States) | 5–0 (7–0 agg.) | (Canada) Atlético Ottawa | Nashville, Tennessee |
| 19:00 EDT (UTC-04:00) | Muyl 21'; Knight 36'; Pacius 55'; Maher 63'; Qasem 83' | Report | | Stadium: Geodis Park; Attendance: 11,849; Referee: Selvin Brown (Honduras) |
