= Canadian Premier League Awards =

Set of soccer awards and ceremony

Logo of the CPL Awards

The Canadian Premier League Awards is a ceremony held annually at the end of each Canadian Premier League season. There are a total of seven individual awards given to players or coaches based on their performance in the regular season. For the majority of the awards, nominees are selected by the league and voted on by members of the media. The winner of each award receives an Inuit soapstone sculpture designed by artists from Cape Dorset, Nunavut.

The CPL Awards were first held in 2019 and included five honours (Golden Boot, Golden Glove, Coach of the Year, U21 Canadian Player of the Year, and Player of the Year). The awards initially took into account performance across the whole CPL season, including playoffs and finals.

In 2022, two new awards were added (Defender of the Year and Players' Player of the Year) and all awards became based solely on performance in the regular season. In 2024, a Finals MVP trophy was added.

== Awards ==
=== Golden Boot ===
The Golden Boot is awarded to the player who scores the most goals in the regular season. In the event of a tie, the award is shared between all players level on goals.

Season	Winner	Goals	Games	Rate
2019	(Canada) Tristan Borges (Forge FC)	13 (Note: Includes 1 goal scored in the CPL Finals)	27	0.48
2020	(Trinidad and Tobago) Akeem Garcia (HFX Wanderers FC)	6	11	0.55
2021	(Brazil) João Morelli (HFX Wanderers FC)	14	21	0.67
2022	(Mexico) Alejandro Díaz (Pacific FC)	13	18	0.72
2023	(Northern Ireland) Ollie Bassett (Atlético Ottawa)	11	27	0.41
2023	(New Zealand) Myer Bevan (Cavalry FC)	11	26	0.42
2024	(Germany) Tobias Warschewski (Cavalry FC)	12	24	0.5
2025	(Canada) Samuel Salter (Atlético Ottawa)	19	28	0.68
2026	(Canada) Loïc Kwemi (FC Supra du Québec)	15	26	0.58

=== Golden Glove ===
The Golden Glove is the award for the goalkeeper of the year.

Season	Winner	Finalists
2019	(Canada) Marco Carducci (Cavalry FC)	(Canada) Nathan Ingham (York9 FC) (Canada) Connor James (FC Edmonton)
2020	(Canada) Triston Henry (Forge FC)	(Canada) Christian Oxner (HFX Wanderers FC) (Canada) Callum Irving (Pacific FC)
2021	(Canada) Jonathan Sirois (Valour FC)	(Canada) Marco Carducci (Cavalry FC) (Canada) Triston Henry (Forge FC)
2022	(Canada) Marco Carducci (Cavalry FC)	(Canada) Nathan Ingham (Atlético Ottawa) (Canada) Callum Irving (Pacific FC)
2023	(Canada) Triston Henry (Forge FC)	(Canada) Marco Carducci (Cavalry FC) (Algeria) Rayane Yesli (Valour FC)
2024	(Canada) Emil Gazdov (Pacific FC)	(Canada) Callum Irving (Vancouver FC) (France) Thomas Vincensini (York United)
2025	(Czech Republic) Jassem Koleilat (Forge FC)	(Canada) Marco Carducci (Cavalry FC) (Canada) Nathan Ingham (Atlético Ottawa)
2026	(Democratic Republic of the Congo) Dimitry Bertaud (Forge FC)	(Canada) Nathan Ingham (Cavalry FC) (Canada) Christopher Kalongo (Atlético Ottawa)

=== Coach of the Year ===
In 2022, this award was voted on by head coaches and one assistant coach from each club.

Season	Winner	Finalists
2019	(England) Tommy Wheeldon Jr. (Cavalry FC)	(Canada) Jim Brennan (York9 FC) (Canada) Bobby Smyrniotis (Forge FC)
2020	(Trinidad and Tobago) Stephen Hart (HFX Wanderers FC)	(Canada) Bobby Smyrniotis (Forge FC) (Spain) Mista (Atlético Ottawa)
2021	(Norway) Pa-Modou Kah (Pacific FC)	(Canada) Bobby Smyrniotis (Forge FC) (England) Tommy Wheeldon Jr. (Cavalry FC)
2022	(Spain) Carlos González (Atlético Ottawa)	(Canada) Bobby Smyrniotis (Forge FC) (Canada) James Merriman (Pacific FC)
2023	(England) Tommy Wheeldon Jr. (Cavalry FC)	(Canada) Bobby Smyrniotis (Forge FC) (Canada) Patrice Gheisar (HFX Wanderers FC)
2024	(Canada) Bobby Smyrniotis (Forge FC)	(Mexico) Benjamín Mora (York United) (England) Tommy Wheeldon Jr. (Cavalry FC)
2025	(Canada) Bobby Smyrniotis (Forge FC)	(Mexico) Diego Mejía (Atlético Ottawa) (Canada) Mauro Eustáquio (York United)
2026	(England) Tommy Wheeldon Jr. (Cavalry FC)	(Brazil) Gustavo Leal (Atlético Ottawa) (Canada) Bobby Smyrniotis (Forge FC)

=== Player of the Year ===
This is awarded to the league's most valuable player, as voted by the media. Since 2022, the CPL has announced five nominees rather than three.

Season	Winner	Finalists
2019	(Canada) Tristan Borges (Forge FC)	(Canada) Kyle Bekker (Forge FC) (Republic of the Congo) Dominique Malonga (Cavalry FC)
2020	(Canada) Kyle Bekker (Forge FC)	(Canada) Marco Bustos (Pacific FC) (Trinidad and Tobago) Akeem Garcia (HFX Wanderers FC)
2021	(Brazil) João Morelli (HFX Wanderers FC)	(Canada) Kyle Bekker (Forge FC) (Canada) Terran Campbell (Pacific FC)
2022	(Northern Ireland) Ollie Bassett (Atlético Ottawa)	(Sweden) Alexander Achinioti-Jonsson (Forge FC) (Canada) Manny Aparicio (Pacific FC) (Canada) Sean Rea (Valour FC) (Canada) Ballou Tabla (Atlético Ottawa)
2023	(Netherlands) Daan Klomp (Cavalry FC)	(Canada) Manny Aparicio (Pacific FC) (Canada) Kyle Bekker (Forge FC) (France) Lorenzo Callegari (HFX Wanderers FC) (Somalia) Ali Musse (Cavalry FC)
2024	(Canada) Tristan Borges (Forge FC)	(Canada) Kyle Bekker (Forge FC) (Canada) Alessandro Hojabrpour (Forge FC) (Germany) Tobias Warschewski (Cavalry FC) (Canada) Brian Wright (York United)
2025	(Canada) Samuel Salter (Atlético Ottawa)	(Canada) Kyle Bekker (Forge FC) (Canada) Daniel Nimick (Forge FC) (Canada) Sergio Camargo (Cavalry FC) (United States) David Rodríguez (Atlético Ottawa)
2026	(Germany) Tobias Warschewski (Cavalry FC)	(France) Antoine Batisse (Forge FC) (Canada) Isaiah Johnston (HFX Wanderers FC) (Canada) Loïc Kwemi (FC Supra du Québec) (Canada) Ballou Tabla (Atlético Ottawa)

=== Best Under 21 Canadian Player of the Year ===
The CPL requires clubs to roster a minimum of three Canadian players under the age of 21 and to play them for a minimum of 2,000 minutes in a season. All under-21 Canadian players are eligible for this award.

Season	Winner	Finalists
2019	(Canada) Tristan Borges (Forge FC)	(Canada) Diyaeddine Abzi (York9 FC) (Canada) Terran Campbell (Pacific FC)
2020	(Canada) Mohamed Farsi (Cavalry FC)	(Canada) Chrisnovic N'sa (HFX Wanderers FC) (Canada) Julian Dunn (Valour FC)
2021	(Canada) Alessandro Hojabrpour (Pacific FC)	(Canada) Max Ferrari (York United FC) (Canada) Victor Loturi (Cavalry FC)
2022	(Canada) Sean Rea (Valour FC)	(Canada) Osaze De Rosario (York United FC) (Canada) Woobens Pacius (Forge FC)
2023	(Canada) Matteo De Brienne (Valour FC)	(Canada) James Cameron (Vancouver FC) (Canada) Kwasi Poku (Forge FC)
2024	(Canada) Kwasi Poku (Forge FC)	(Canada) Noah Abatneh (York United) (Canada) Emil Gazdov (Pacific FC)
2025	(Canada) Tiago Coimbra (HFX Wanderers FC)	(Canada) Noah Abatneh (Atlético Ottawa) (Brazil) Gabriel Antinoro (Atlético Ottawa) (Canada) Thierno Bah (Vancouver FC) (Canada) Hoce Massunda (Forge FC)
2026	(Canada) Adam Pearlman (Cavalry FC)	(Canada) Alessandro Biello (FC Supra du Québec) (Canada) Sergei Kozlovskiy (Atlético Ottawa) (Canada) Hoce Massunda (Forge FC) (Canada) Kian Proctor (Vancouver FC)

=== Defender of the Year ===
Season	Winner	Finalists
2022	(Sweden) Alexander Achinioti-Jönsson (Forge FC)	(Canada) Amer Đidić (Pacific FC) (Canada) Dominick Zator (York United)
2023	(Netherlands) Daan Klomp (Cavalry FC)	(Canada) Manjrekar James (Forge FC) (Canada) Daniel Nimick (HFX Wanderers FC)
2024	(Netherlands) Daan Klomp (Cavalry FC)	(Sweden) Alexander Achinioti-Jönsson (Forge FC) (Canada) Themi Antonoglou (Valour FC)
2025	(Canada) Daniel Nimick (Forge FC)	(Canada) Noah Abatneh (Atlético Ottawa) (Albania) Rezart Rama (Forge FC)
2026	(Netherlands) Daan Klomp (Cavalry FC)	(France) Antoine Batisse (Forge FC) (Canada) Daniel Nimick (Forge FC)

=== Player's Player of the Year ===
Introduced in 2022, this is the only award is voted on by the players. All players that played in a game are eligible to vote and be voted for. Players cast three votes in a 5–3–1 scoring system and cannot vote for a teammate. The top ten players who receive the most votes are named as finalists prior to the awards ceremony.

Season	Winner	Runner-up	Third place
2022	(Northern Ireland) Ollie Bassett (Atlético Ottawa)	(Canada) Ballou Tabla (Atlético Ottawa)	(Mexico) Alejandro Díaz (Pacific FC)
2023	(Somalia) Ali Musse (Cavalry FC)	(Canada) Kyle Bekker (Forge FC)	(Netherlands) Daan Klomp (Cavalry FC)
2024	(Canada) Brian Wright (York United)	(Canada) Tristan Borges (Forge FC)	(Belgium) Béni Badibanga (Forge FC)
2025	(Canada) Samuel Salter (Atlético Ottawa)	(United States) David Rodríguez (Atlético Ottawa)	(Ghana) Nana Ampomah (Forge FC)
2026	(Germany) Tobias Warschewski (Cavalry FC)	(Canada) Loïc Kwemi (FC Supra du Québec)	(Canada) Ballou Tabla (Atlético Ottawa)

=== CPL Final MVP ===
Final	Winner
2024	(Germany) Tobias Warschewski (Cavalry FC)
2025	(United States) David Rodríguez (Atlético Ottawa)
2026	(Germany) Tobias Warschewski (Cavalry FC)

== Ceremonies ==
Season	Date	Location	Ref.
2019	November 26, 2019	Toronto, Ontario	
2020	November 26, 2020	Held virtually	
2021	December 14, 2021	Toronto, Ontario	
2022	October 28, 2022	Ottawa, Ontario	
2023	October 26, 2023	Hamilton, Ontario	
2024	November 7, 2024	Calgary, Alberta	
2025	November 7, 2025	Gatineau, Quebec	
2026	November 19, 2026	TBD	
