= Cavalry FC–Forge FC rivalry =

Soccer rivalry between Canadian teams

Cavalry–Forge rivalry
- Cavalry FC Forge FC
- First meeting: Forge 1–2 Cavalry; CPL (May 12, 2019)
- Latest meeting: Cavalry 1–1 Forge; CPL (September 19, 2026)
- Next meeting: TBD
- Stadiums: ATCO Field, Foothills County; Hamilton Stadium, Hamilton

Statistics
- Total meetings: 41
- Most wins: Forge (16)
- Top scorer: Kyle Bekker (7)
- All-time series: Forge: 16–12–13
- Regular season series: Forge: 10–10–9
- Postseason results: Forge: 6–1–3 (Note: Includes a 2020 CPL group stage match.)
- Largest victory: Cavalry 3–0 Forge; CPL (August 4, 2023); Cavalry 4–1 Forge; CPL (August 30, 2025)
- Longest win streak: Forge (3); Oct 16–Nov 2, 2019
- Longest unbeaten streak: Forge (6); Oct 16, 2019–Jul 8, 2021

Postseason history
- Total series won: Cavalry 1–4 Forge: 2019 finals: Forge won 2–0 (agg.); 2022 semi-finals: Forge won 3–2 (agg.); 2023 first semi-final: Forge won 2–1; 2023 final: Forge won 2–1 (a.e.t.); 2024 first semi-final: Cavalry won 1–0; 2024 final: Cavalry won 2–1; 2025 second semi-final: Cavalry won 1–0

The Cavalry–Forge rivalry refers to a soccer rivalry which has grown between Calgary-based Cavalry FC and Forge FC of Hamilton, Ontario. The two clubs began play in 2019 and faced each other nine times that season with all matches being decided by one goal or fewer. The clubs were the top teams in the inaugural Canadian Premier League season and the natural rivalry that developed between them has been described as the best in the league.

== History ==
=== 2019 ===
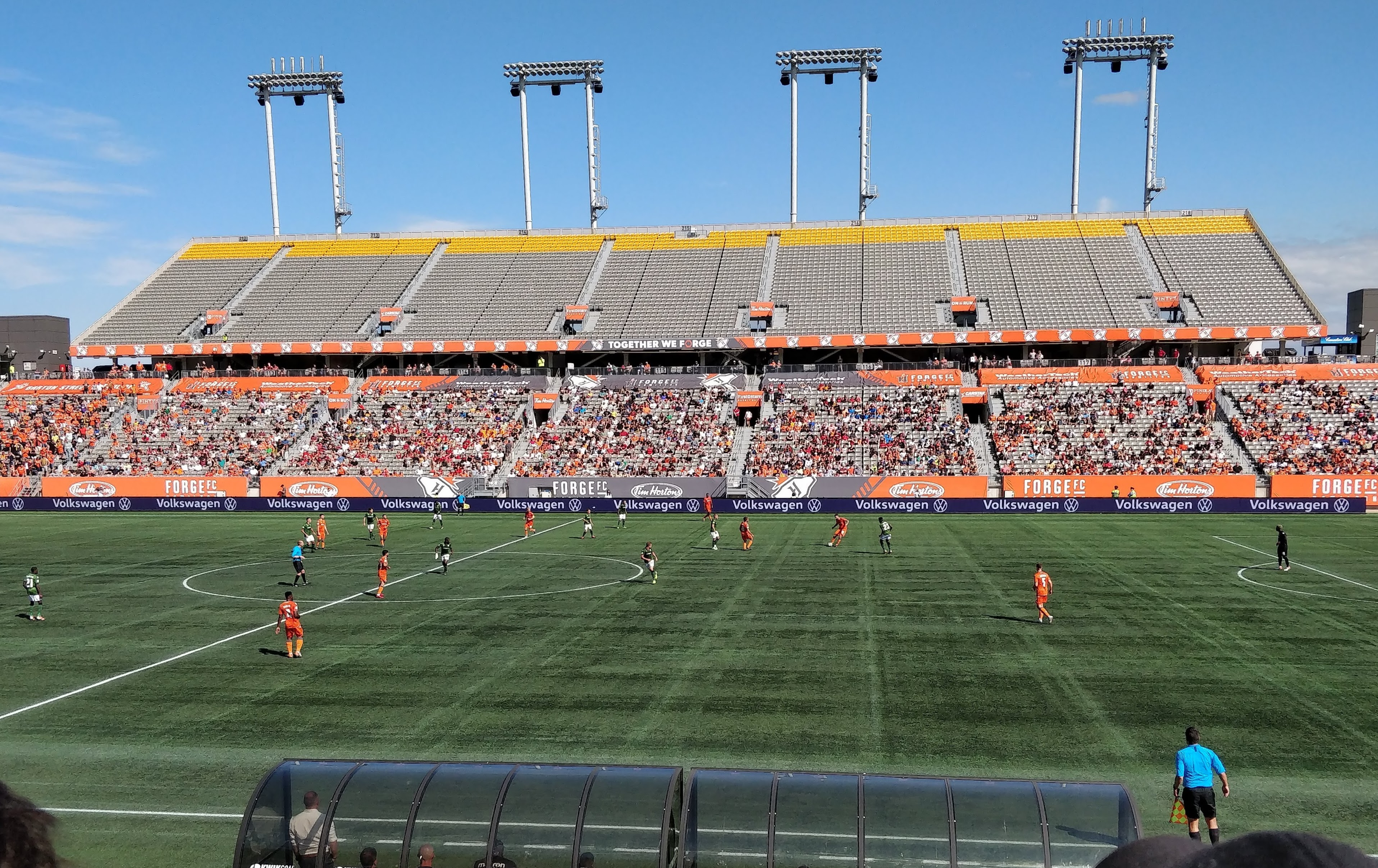
Forge FC hosts Cavalry FC at Tim Hortons Field in Hamilton

The first match between Cavalry and Forge was played on May 12, 2019, at Tim Hortons Field in Hamilton. Cavalry won the game 2–1 with the winning goal from Nico Pasquotti coming late in stoppage time. The following month, the two clubs met in the second round of the 2019 Canadian Championship. Once again, Cavalry scored late into stoppage time in Hamilton; this time on a penalty kick to equalize after Forge goalkeeper Quillan Roberts was sent off for a foul. The drama continued after the match when a scrum broke out between the two teams with opposing players exchanging pushes and shouts.

The day after the match, Cavalry player Jordan Brown accused Forge FC coach Peter Reynders of using racist remarks during the post game scrum, a claim which was supported by his teammates Elijah Adekugbe and Nathan Mavila. Following an investigation, Reynders was initially found to be guilty by the Canadian Soccer Association and suspended 45 days for the incident, however the decision was overturned on appeal. In June 2020, Forge players defended Reynders publicly. The case was referred to a third party, and Reynders was cleared of the charges in August 2020. The match and subsequent allegations are considered to be the first significant moment of the rivalry. In the return leg of the Canadian Championship tie at ATCO Field, Cavalry won 2–1 to advance in the competition.

On June 22, 2019, Forge and Cavalry faced off for the fourth time that season and the third time in 19 days. With a draw, Cavalry could clinch the top record in the 10-game spring season while Forge needed a win to remain in contention. Forge won the game 1–0 on an early goal from captain Kyle Bekker, ending Cavalry's run of seven straight wins to start the season. Cavalry won their following game on June 26 to claim the spring title and a spot in the 2019 Canadian Premier League Finals. Forge secured their place in the finals with a win on September 28.

Forge hosted the first leg of the 2019 CPL Finals on October 26 in Hamilton. In the 37th minute, Cavalry defender Joel Waterman handled the ball in his own penalty area while sliding to prevent a scoring chance. Waterman was sent off and Forge was awarded a penalty kick. League-leading scorer Tristan Borges took the penalty kick but it was stopped by Marco Carducci to keep the game scoreless. Late into first half stoppage time, Borges scored the game's only goal, beating Carducci with a left-footed strike to give Forge the lead going into halftime. In the 69th minute, a challenge between Borges and Jay Wheeldon of Cavalry sent both players to the ground. As a result of the play, Borges was shown a red card and both teams finished the match with 10 players. After the match, Cavalry and Forge appealed their respective red cards to the Canadian Soccer Association but only the suspension to Forge's Tristan Borges was overturned, allowing him to play in the second leg. During the second leg in Calgary on November 2, a total of seven yellow cards were issued. Forge scored the game's only goal late in stoppage time and won the series 2–0 on aggregate, becoming the first-ever champions of the Canadian Premier League.

In all, Forge and Cavalry played nine matches against each other in 2019 across all competitions with all matches decided by one goal or fewer.

=== 2020–2022 ===
The season opener of the 2020 CPL Island Games was chosen to be a rematch of the 2019 final. The match ended a 2–2 draw with Cavalry equalizing in the 94th minute with a controversial penalty kick. Forge would get their revenge by defeating Cavalry 1–0 in their final group stage match to clinch a spot in the 2020 Canadian Premier League Final while also eliminating Cavalry.

In their fourth and final regular season meeting of 2022, Forge defeated Cavalry in a match that featured three goals and three red cards. The two clubs ended the regular season with identical records (14–5–9), finishing 2nd and 3rd and earning a meeting in the CPL semifinals. Following a 1–1 draw in the first leg, Forge won 3–2 on aggregate to advance to its fourth consecutive CPL Final. In the tie's second leg, Kyle Bekker of Forge and David Norman Jr. of Cavalry were both sent off within five minutes of each other in the first half.

== Results ==
Cavalry FC win Draw Forge FC win

Season	Competition	Date	Home team	Result	Away team	Venue	Attendance	Recap	Series
2019	Canadian Premier League	May 12, 2019	Forge	1–2	Cavalry	Tim Hortons Field, Hamilton	5,921		CAV: 1–0–0
2019	Canadian Championship	June 4, 2019	Forge	1–1	Cavalry	Tim Hortons Field, Hamilton	5,174		CAV: 1–1–0
2019	Canadian Championship	June 11, 2019	Cavalry	2–1	Forge	ATCO Field, Foothills County	4,000		CAV: 2–1–0
2019	Canadian Premier League	June 22, 2019	Cavalry	0–1	Forge	ATCO Field, Foothills County	4,697		CAV: 2–1–1
2019	Canadian Premier League	August 25, 2019	Forge	1–0	Cavalry	Tim Hortons Field, Hamilton	6,883		Tied: 2–1–2
2019	Canadian Premier League	October 9, 2019	Cavalry	2–1	Forge	ATCO Field, Foothills County	1,938		CAV: 3–1–2
2019	Canadian Premier League	October 16, 2019	Forge	1–0	Cavalry	Tim Hortons Field, Hamilton	3,864		Tied: 3–1–3
2019	CPL Finals	October 26, 2019	Forge	1–0	Cavalry	Tim Hortons Field, Hamilton	10,486		FOR: 4–1–3
2019	CPL Finals	November 2, 2019	Cavalry	0–1	Forge	ATCO Field, Foothills County	5,831		FOR: 5–1–3
2020	Canadian Premier League	August 13, 2020	Forge	2–2	Cavalry	Alumni Field, Charlottetown	0		FOR: 5–2–3
2020	CPL group stage	September 15, 2020	Cavalry	0–1	Forge	Alumni Field, Charlottetown	0		FOR: 6–2–3
2021	Canadian Premier League	July 8, 2021	Cavalry	0–2	Forge	IG Field, Winnipeg	0		FOR: 7–2–3
2021	Canadian Premier League	July 22, 2021	Forge	1–2	Cavalry	IG Field, Winnipeg	0		FOR: 7–2–4
2021	Canadian Premier League	November 16, 2021	Forge	0–1	Cavalry	Tim Hortons Field, Hamilton	2,104		FOR: 7–2–5
2022	Canadian Premier League	April 16, 2022	Forge	2–2	Cavalry	Tim Hortons Field, Hamilton	3,688		FOR: 7–3–5
2022	Canadian Premier League	July 27, 2022	Cavalry	1–2	Forge	ATCO Field, Foothills County	2,989		FOR: 8–3–5
2022	Canadian Premier League	August 12, 2022	Cavalry	2–1	Forge	ATCO Field, Foothills County	3,945		FOR: 8–3–6
2022	Canadian Premier League	September 10, 2022	Forge	2–1	Cavalry	Tim Hortons Field, Hamilton	4,992		FOR: 9–3–6
2022	CPL Playoffs	October 15, 2022	Cavalry	1–1	Forge	ATCO Field, Foothills County	3,179		FOR: 9–4–6
2022	CPL Playoffs	October 23, 2022	Forge	2–1	Cavalry	Tim Hortons Field, Hamilton	7,133		FOR: 10–4–6
2023	Canadian Premier League	April 15, 2023	Forge	2–2	Cavalry	Tim Hortons Field, Hamilton	6,892		FOR: 10–5–6
2023	Canadian Premier League	June 3, 2023	Cavalry	1–1	Forge	ATCO Field, Foothills County	3,503		FOR: 10–6–6
2023	Canadian Premier League	August 4, 2023	Cavalry	3–0	Forge	ATCO Field, Foothills County	4,106		FOR: 10–6–7
2023	Canadian Premier League	September 9, 2023	Forge	0–0	Cavalry	Tim Hortons Field, Hamilton	6,751		FOR: 10–7–7
2023	CPL Playoffs	October 14, 2023	Cavalry	1–2	Forge	ATCO Field, Foothills County	4,385		FOR: 11–7–7
2023	CPL Final	October 28, 2023	Forge	2–1 (Note: Forge won 2–1 after extra time to win the Canadian Premier League.)	Cavalry	Tim Hortons Field, Hamilton	13,925		FOR: 12–7–7
2024	Canadian Premier League	April 13, 2024	Forge	2–1	Cavalry	Tim Hortons Field, Hamilton	7,395		FOR: 13–7–7
2024	Canadian Premier League	June 8, 2024	Cavalry	1–0	Forge	ATCO Field, Foothills County	4,691		FOR: 13–7–8
2024	Canadian Premier League	July 21, 2024	Cavalry	1–1	Forge	ATCO Field, Foothills County	4,569		FOR: 13–8–8
2024	Canadian Premier League	September 7, 2024	Forge	2–1	Cavalry	Tim Hortons Field, Hamilton	4,671		FOR: 14–8–8
2024	CPL Playoffs	October 27, 2024	Forge	0–1	Cavalry	Tim Hortons Field, Hamilton	6,521		FOR: 14–8–9
2024	CPL Final	November 9, 2024	Cavalry	2–1	Forge	ATCO Field, Foothills County	7,052		FOR: 14–8–10
2025	Canadian Premier League	April 5, 2025	Forge	1–0	Cavalry	Hamilton Stadium, Hamilton	7,963		FOR: 15–8–10
2025	Canadian Premier League	May 31, 2025	Forge	1–1	Cavalry	Hamilton Stadium, Hamilton	6,578		FOR: 15–9–10
2025	Canadian Premier League	August 30, 2025	Cavalry	4–1	Forge	ATCO Field, Foothills County	4,786		FOR: 15–9–11
2025	Canadian Premier League	October 10, 2025	Cavalry	1–1	Forge	ATCO Field, Foothills County	4,763		FOR: 15–10–11
2025	CPL Playoffs	November 2, 2025	Forge	0–1	Cavalry	Hamilton Stadium, Hamilton	6,125		FOR: 15–10–12
2026	Canadian Premier League	April 18, 2026	Forge	0–0	Cavalry	Hamilton Stadium, Hamilton	4,178		FOR: 15–11–12
2026	Canadian Premier League	May 31, 2026	Forge	1–0	Cavalry	Hamilton Stadium, Hamilton	6,101		FOR: 16–11–12
2026	Canadian Premier League	August 15, 2026	Cavalry	2–1	Forge	ATCO Field, Foothills County	4,721		FOR: 16–11–13
2026	Canadian Premier League	September 19, 2026	Cavalry	1–1	Forge	ATCO Field, Foothills County	5,009		FOR: 16–12–13

== Statistics ==
As of September 19, 2026

Competition	Matches	Wins		Draws	Goals	
Competition	Matches	Cavalry	Forge	Draws	Cavalry	Forge
Canadian Premier League	29	9	10	10	34	32
CPL Playoffs	10	3	6	1	8	11
Canadian Championship	2	1	0	1	3	2
Total matches	41	13	16	12	45	45

== League ranking by season ==
P.	2019			2020			2021		2022		2023		2024		2025	
P.	Spring	Fall	Finals	1st	2nd	Final	Season	Playoffs	Season	Playoffs	Season	Playoffs	Season	Playoffs	Season	Playoffs
1	1	1	C	1	1	C	1			C	1	C	1	C	1	
2	2	2	RU				2	RU	2		2	RU	2	RU		RU
3				3	3			SF	3	SF					3	SF
4																
5																
6																
7																
8																

== Post-season and cup results ==
CPL Playoffs
Season	Round	Advanced	Score(s)
2019	Finals	Forge	2–0 on aggregate
2022	Semi-finals	Forge	3–2 on aggregate
2023	First semifinal	Forge	2–1
2023	Final	Forge	2–1 (a.e.t.)
2024	First semifinal	Cavalry	1–0
2024	Final	Cavalry	2–1
2025	Second semifinal	Cavalry	1–0

Canadian Championship
Season	Round	Advanced	Score(s)
2019	Second qualifying round	Cavalry	3–2 on aggregate

== Records ==
=== Top goalscorers ===
As of September 19, 2026

Rank	Player	Club(s)	Nationality	Goals
1	Kyle Bekker	Forge	Canada	7
2	**Tristan Borges**	Forge	Canada	6
2	**Sergio Camargo**	Cavalry	Canada	6
2	**Ali Musse**	Cavalry	Somalia	6
2	**Tobias Warschewski**	Cavalry	Germany	6
6	David Choinière	Forge	Canada	5
7	**Daan Klomp**	Cavalry	Netherlands	4
7	Dominique Malonga	Cavalry	Congo	4
7	Joe Mason	Cavalry	Republic of Ireland	4
7	Anthony Novak	Forge; Cavalry	Canada	4

=== Clean sheets ===
As of September 19, 2026

Rank	Player	Club	Clean sheets
1	(Canada) Triston Henry	Forge	7
2	(Canada) Marco Carducci	Cavalry	5
3	(Democratic Republic of the Congo) **Dimitry Bertaud**	Forge	2
4	(Canada) Tyson Farago	Cavalry	1
4	(Czech Republic) Jassem Koleilat	Forge	1
4	(Guyana) Quillan Roberts	Forge	1

Players in bold are still active players with a team.

=== Discipline ===
As of September 19, 2026

List of sent off players
Player	Club	Date	Competition	Minute	Type	Score	Final
(Guyana) Quillan Roberts	Forge (H)	June 4, 2019	Canadian Championship	90+4'	(yellow card) (yellow-red card)	1–0	1–1
(Canada) Dominic Samuel	Forge (H)	October 16, 2019	League	71'	(yellow card) (yellow-red card)	1–0	1–0
(Canada) Joel Waterman	Cavalry (A)	October 26, 2019	CPL Finals	37'	Red card	0–0	1–0
(Canada) Tristan Borges (Note: Borges's red card was rescinded by Canada Soccer after the match.)	Forge (H)	October 26, 2019	CPL Finals	69'	(red card)	1–0	1–0
(Canada) Kyle Bekker	Forge (H)	September 10, 2022	League	70'	Red card	2–1	2–1
(Canada) Joseph Di Chiara	Cavalry (A)	September 10, 2022	League	86'	Red card	2–1	2–1
(Haiti) Mikaël Cantave	Cavalry (A)	September 10, 2022	League	90+5'	(yellow card) (yellow-red card)	2–1	2–1
(Canada) Kyle Bekker (2)	Forge (H)	October 23, 2022	CPL Playoffs	43'	Red card	0–0	2–1
(Canada) David Norman Jr.	Cavalry (A)	October 23, 2022	CPL Playoffs	45+3'	(yellow card) (yellow-red card)	0–0	2–1
(Canada) Khadim Kane	Forge (A)	June 8, 2024	League	89'	Red card	1–0	1–0
(Mexico) Daniel Parra	Forge (A)	July 21, 2024	League	82'	(yellow card) (yellow-red card)	1–1	1–1
(Canada) Zayne Bruno	Forge (H)	April 5, 2025	League	72'	(yellow card) (yellow-red card)	1–0	1–0
(Albania) Rezart Rama	Forge (H)	April 18, 2026	League	56'	(yellow card) (yellow-red card)	0–0	0–0
(Albania) Rezart Rama (2)	Forge (A)	August 15, 2026	League	38'	Red card	0–1	2–1
(Serbia) Marko Jevremović	Forge (A)	August 15, 2026	League	90'	Red card	2–1	2–1
(Germany) Tobias Warschewski	Cavalry (H)	September 19, 2026	League	90+2'	(yellow card) (yellow-red card)	1–1	1–1

== Players who played for both clubs ==
=== Forge, then Cavalry ===
- (Canada) Anthony Novak (Forge: 2019–2020, Cavalry: 2021–2022)
- (Canada) Harry Paton (Forge: 2025, Cavalry: 2026–present)

== See also ==
- 905 Derby
- Cavalry FC–FC Edmonton rivalry
- Pacific FC–Vancouver FC rivalry
- Canadian Classique
