= Serhiy Pokydin =

Ukrainian footballer

Personal information
- Full name: Serhiy Volodymyrovych Pokydin
- Date of birth: 16 March 1960 (age 66)
- Place of birth: Horlivka, Ukrainian SSR
- Height: 1.77 m (5 ft 10 in)
- Position: Forward

Senior career*
Years	Team	Apps	(Gls)
1976	FC Shakhtar Horlivka	1	(0)
1977–1986	FC Shakhtar Donetsk	67	(0)
1992–2000	Montreal Ukrainians	?	(?)

Managerial career
- 1992–2000: Montreal Ukrainians (assistant)
- Dynamo-Inter Montreal
- * Club domestic league appearances and goals

Serhiy Volodymyrovych Pokydin (Ukrainian: Сергій Володимирович Покидін; born 16 March 1960 in Horlivka) is a retired Ukrainian football forward.

With a dissolution of the Soviet Union, Pokydin emigrated to Canada. He is the grandfather of Canadian player Sergei Kozlovskiy.
