= Tobias Warschewski =

German footballer (born 1998)

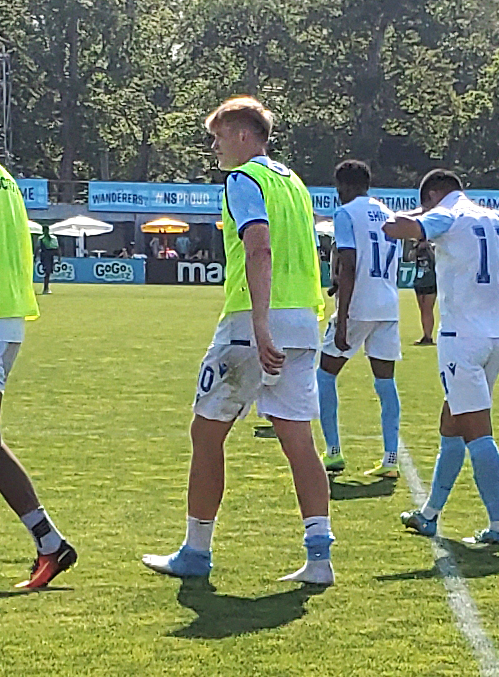
- Warschewski in 2022 with FC Edmonton

Personal information
- Date of birth: 6 February 1998 (age 28)
- Place of birth: Dortmund, Germany
- Height: 1.87 m (6 ft 2 in)
- Position: Forward

Team information
- Current team: Cavalry FC
- Number: 9

Youth career
- 2013–2015: Eintracht Dortmund
- 2015–2017: Preußen Münster

Senior career*
Years	Team	Apps	(Gls)
2016–2019	Preußen Münster	46	(5)
2020–2021	Phönix Lübeck	5	(1)
2021	FC Edmonton	26	(4)
2022	York United	0	(0)
2022	→ FC Edmonton (loan)	23	(7)
2024–	Cavalry FC	77	(31)

International career^{‡}
2017	Germany U19	4	(2)
- * Club domestic league appearances and goals as of October 25, 2026 ‡ National team caps and goals as of 19 February 2021

Tobias Warschewski (born 6 February 1998) is a German professional footballer who plays as a forward for Canadian Premier League side Cavalry FC.

== Club career ==
=== Germany ===
Warschewski played for Preußen Münster in the 2016–17, 2017–18, and 2018–19 seasons where he scored five goals in 46 3. Liga appearances.

On 21 July 2020, Warschewski signed with Regionalliga Nord side Phönix Lübeck. On 23 September 2020, he made his debut as a 73rd-minute substitute and scored his first goal for the club in a 3–0 win over Heider SV. He went on to make another four appearances for Phönix that season, for a total of one goal in five appearances.

=== FC Edmonton ===
On 19 February 2021, Warschewski signed a one-year contract with Canadian Premier League side FC Edmonton. He scored his first goal for Edmonton on 31 July against Valour FC, netting the second goal in a 3–1 victory. Warschewski was one of the few bright spots in a disappointing season for FC Edmonton, as he finished the season with the most assists in the league, with 7, even as Edmonton finished in seventh place. On 9 February 2022, the club announced that Warschewski and all but two other players would not be returning for the 2022 season.

In February 2022, Warschewski signed a one-year deal with an optional extension with York United, and was then immediately loaned back to FC Edmonton. 2022 was expected to be a difficult season for Edmonton, with financial issues drastically affecting the club. In their first match of the 2022 season, he scored a bicycle kick in the final seconds to ensure a 1–1 draw against Valour FC. In December 2022, York announced Warschewski would be departing the club.

=== Cavalry FC ===
On January 16, 2024, he joined fellow Canadian Premier League club Cavalry FC on a free transfer, signing a one-year contract with an option for two more seasons. At the end of the 2024 season, Warschewski scored five goals in Cavalry's final goal games to win the CPL Golden Boot. On 10 November, he scored a goal and was awarded the CPL Final MVP award in a 2–1 victory over Forge FC in the 2024 CPL final, helping the club win their first league title. In April 2025, Warschewski signed a two year contract extension with Cavalry, with a club option for the 2027 season. In the 2026 season, Warschewski would be named the league's Player of the Year, and Player's Player of the Year. He would also be named MVP of the 2026 Canadian Premier League final as he would score two goals and assist the third in Cavalry's 3-2 win over Atletico Ottawa.

== International career ==
In March 2017, Warschewski played for Germany's U-19 team in UEFA European Under-19 Championship qualifying, making his debut as a substitute against Cyprus. He was subsequently called up for the final tournament that July, where he made a substitute appearance against the Netherlands and then appeared as a substitute again against England, scoring a consolation goal in a 4–1 loss.

== Career statistics ==
As of match played November 21, 2026

Appearances and goals by club, season and competition
Club	Season	League			Cup		Continental		Playoffs		Total	
Club	Season	Division	Apps	Goals	Apps	Goals	Apps	Goals	Apps	Goals	Apps	Goals
Preußen Münster	2016–17	3. Liga	27	4	—		—		—		27	4
Preußen Münster	2017–18	3. Liga	11	0	—		—		—		11	0
Preußen Münster	2018–19	3. Liga	8	1	—		—		—		8	1
Preußen Münster	Total		46	5	—		—		—		46	5
Phönix Lübeck	2020–21	Regionalliga Nord	5	1	—		—		—		5	1
FC Edmonton	2021	Canadian Premier League	26	4	1	0	0	0	0	0	27	4
York United FC	2022	Canadian Premier League	0	0	0	0	0	0	0	0	0	0
FC Edmonton (loan)	2022	Canadian Premier League	23	7	1	1	0	0	0	0	24	8
Cavalry FC	2024	Canadian Premier League	24	12	3	1	2	0	2	2	31	15
Cavalry FC	2025	Canadian Premier League	25	8	2	2	3	1	3	3	35	14
Cavalry FC	2026	Canadian Premier League	26	11	2	1	0	0	3	3	31	15
Cavalry FC	Total		77	31	7	4	5	1	8	8	97	44
Career total			177	48	9	5	5	1	8	8	199	62

== Honours ==
Cavalry FC

- Canadian Premier League: 2024, 2026
- CPL Shield: 2026

Individual

- Canadian Premier League Golden Boot: 2024
