= Ralph Khoury =

Lebanese footballer (born 2007)

Personal information
- Full name: Ralph Elias Khoury
- Date of birth: May 9, 2007 (age 19)
- Place of birth: Beirut, Lebanon
- Height: 1.88 m (6 ft 2 in)
- Position: Forward

Team information
- Current team: Atlético Ottawa
- Number: 19

Youth career
- 2011–2020: Athletico
- 2021–2022: Nasr Hadath
- 2021–2022: Eleven Football Pro
- 2022–2024: Ottawa South United

Senior career*
Years	Team	Apps	(Gls)
2023	Ottawa South United	2	(0)
2025–	Atlético Ottawa	21	(1)
2025	→ Ottawa South United (loan)	7	(1)

International career^{‡}
2018	Lebanon U11		
2022	Lebanon U15		
2026–	Lebanon	2	(0)
- * Club domestic league appearances and goals as of October 25, 2026 ‡ National team caps and goals as of October 4, 2026

Ralph Elias Khoury (Arabic: رالف إلياس خوري; born May 9, 2007) is a Lebanese professional footballer who plays as a forward for Canadian Premier League club Atlético Ottawa and the Lebanon national team.

== Early life ==
Khoury was born in Lebanon, where started his youth career at Athletico, playing from the under-5s to under-15s (2011–2020). He later played for Nasr Hadath and Eleven Football Pro, finishing as the top scorer of the 2021–22 U-16 league.

In 2022, Khoury moved to Canada, joining Ottawa South United's youth setup. He made two senior appearances in Ligue1 Québec during the 2023 season. Khoury also represented Team Ontario in 2024.

== Club career ==
=== Atlético Ottawa ===
==== 2025 season ====
On April 29, 2025, Khoury signed a developmental contract with Canadian Premier League club Atlético Ottawa. He made his professional debut on May 10, 2025, coming on for Samuel Salter in the 69th minute of a 5–2 league win over Valour FC. Throughout the 2025 season, he also played with Ottawa South United in Ligue1 Québec.

On September 16, 2025, Khoury signed an Exceptional Young Talent (EYT) contract with Atlético Ottawa through the end of 2027, with options for 2028 and 2029; in the process, he became the second player to sign an EYT deal with the club, after Sergei Kozlovskiy. Khoury finished the 2025 season with seven appearances in the Canadian Premier League for Atlético Ottawa, and one goal in seven appearances in Ligue1 Québec for Ottawa South United.

==== 2026 season ====
Khoury made his CONCACAF Champions Cup debut on February 17, 2026, by starting in the first leg of Atlético Ottawa's first-round tie against Nashville SC. On April 4, 2026, he was moved from Atlético Ottawa's Developmental Roster to its Primary Roster as a Domestic Under-21 player. On August 16, 2026, he recorded his first goal and assist for Atlético Ottawa after coming on as a 72nd-minute substitute, assisting the equalizer in the 83rd minute before scoring the winning goal in the 90th minute to complete a 2–1 comeback victory over Supra du Québec.

== International career ==
In July 2018, Khoury took part in the Marcet World Cup tournament in Barcelona with the Lebanon under-11 team. In May 2022, Khoury was named to the Lebanon under-15 team for a friendly series featuring club and national teams; he scored a hat-trick on May 12, in a 3–0 victory in a friendly against Armenian club FC Pyunik.

Khoury received his first call-up to the Lebanon national team from head coach Madjid Bougherra in September 2026, ahead of friendly matches against the Maldives and Kyrgyzstan in October. He made his debut on October 1, in a 6–0 win against the Maldives.

== Personal life ==
Born in Lebanon, Khoury became a dual citizen after moving to Ottawa, Canada in 2022. He is the cousin of fellow footballer Pilar Khoury.

== Career statistics ==
=== Club ===
As of match played October 25, 2026

Appearances and goals by club, season and competition
Club	Season	League			Playoffs		National cup (Note: Includes Canadian Championship)		Continental		Total	
Club	Season	Division	Apps	Goals	Apps	Goals	Apps	Goals	Apps	Goals	Apps	Goals
Ottawa South United	2023	Ligue1 Québec	2	0	—		—		—		2	0
Atlético Ottawa	2025	Canadian Premier League	7	0	0	0	0	0	—		7	0
Atlético Ottawa	2026	Canadian Premier League	14	1	—		1	0	1 (Note: Appearance in CONCACAF Champions Cup)	0	16	1
Atlético Ottawa	Total		21	1	0	0	1	0	1	0	23	1
Ottawa South United (loan)	2025	Ligue1 Québec	7	1	—		—		—		7	1
Career total			26	2	0	0	1	0	1	0	28	2

=== International ===
As of match played October 4, 2026

Appearances and goals by national team and year
National team	Year	Apps	Goals
Lebanon	2026	2	0
Total		2	0

== See also ==
- List of association football families
