= Reinaldo Abraham =

Venezuelan footballer (born 2008)

Personal information
- Full name: Reinaldo Ignacio Abraham Pinate
- Date of birth: April 11, 2008 (age 18)
- Place of birth: Caracas, Venezuela
- Height: 6 ft 1 in (1.85 m)
- Position: Forward

Team information
- Current team: Atlético Ottawa
- Number: 77

Youth career
- Nepean Hotspurs SC
- Ottawa South United
- 2025–2026: Toronto FC

Senior career*
Years	Team	Apps	(Gls)
2026	Ottawa South United	1	(0)
2026–	Atlético Ottawa	7	(0)
- * Club domestic league appearances and goals as of October 28, 2026

Reinaldo Ignacio Abraham Pinate (born April 11, 2008) is a Venezuelan professional footballer who plays for Atlético Ottawa in the Canadian Premier League.

== Early life ==
Abraham was born in Venezuela, before moving to Canada at age four. He began playing youth soccer with Nepean Hotspurs SC, before joining Ottawa South United, and then the Toronto FC Academy in 2025. In the summer of 2025, he played with Team Ontario at the 2025 Canada Summer Games. In July 2026, he had committed to attend Cleveland State University to play for the men's soccer team in the fall, but ultimately decided to turn professional instead.

== Club career ==
In 2026, Abraham started the season with Ottawa South United in LS Pro.

In August 2026, Abraham signed a developmental contract with Atlético Ottawa in the Canadian Premier League.. On August 16, he made his debut, as a late game substitute, against FC Supra du Québec. In September 2026, he signed a fully professional Exceptional Young Talent contract with the club through the 2028 season with club options for 2029 and 2030.

== International career ==
In November 2026, Abraham was called up to the Venezuela U20 team.

== Career statistics ==
As of November 9, 2026

Appearances and goals by club, season and competition
Club	Season	League			Playoffs		Domestic cup		League cup		Total	
Club	Season	Division	Apps	Goals	Apps	Goals	Apps	Goals	Apps	Goals	Apps	Goals
Ottawa South United	2026	Ligue1 Québec	1	0	–		–		0	0	1	0
Atlético Ottawa	2026	Canadian Premier League	7	0	1	0	0	0	–		8	0
Career total			8	0	1	0	0	0	0	0	9	0
