= Jonantan Villal =

American-Mexican footballer (born 2005)

Personal information
- Full name: Jonantan Villal Ozuna
- Date of birth: 6 January 2005 (age 21)
- Place of birth: Atlanta, Georgia, United States
- Height: 1.65 m (5 ft 5 in)
- Position: Midfielder

Team information
- Current team: Atlético Ottawa (on loan from Atlético San Luis)
- Number: 8

Youth career
- 2016–2022: Atlanta United

Senior career*
Years	Team	Apps	(Gls)
2021–2023	Atlanta United 2	38	(1)
2024–	Atlético San Luis	11	(0)
2026–	→ Atlético Ottawa (loan)	10	(1)

International career^{‡}
2022	Mexico U18	9	(0)
2024–	Mexico U20	3	(2)
Medal record
Men's football
Representing Mexico
CONCACAF U-20 Championship
Winner	2024 Mexico
- * Club domestic league appearances and goals as of 16 July 2026 ‡ National team caps and goals as of 25 July 2024

Jonantan Villal Ozuna ([ˈɟʝonantan]; born 6 January 2005) is a professional footballer who plays as a midfielder for Atlético Ottawa of the Canadian Premier League, on loan from Liga MX club Atlético San Luis, and the Mexico national under-20 team. Born in the United States, he has represented Mexico at youth level.

== Club career ==
Villal has played with the Atlanta United academy since it began in 2016. He made appearances as an academy player with Atlanta United 2 in the 2021 season, before signing a fully professional contract with the club on 7 January 2022, ahead of the new USL Championship season.

On 28 December 2023, Villal transferred to Atlético San Luis.

== Honours ==
Mexico

- CONCACAF U-20 Championship: 2024
