= Erling Myklebust =

Norwegian footballer (born 1996)

Personal information
- Full name: Erling Flotve Myklebust
- Date of birth: 28 May 1996 (age 30)
- Position: Forward

Youth career
- –2012: Åkra

Senior career*
Years	Team	Apps	(Gls)
2013–2014	Åkra		
2015–2017	Haugesund	7	(0)
2016	→ Stord (loan)	12	(2)
2017	→ Vard (loan)	21	(5)
2018–2020	Vard	52	(36)
2021	07 Vestur	8	(1)
2021	Vard	25	(16)
2022–2025	Åsane	97	(26)
2026	Atlético Ottawa	8	(0)
- * Club domestic league appearances and goals as of 1 August 2026

Erling Flotve Myklebust (born 28 May 1996) is a Norwegian football striker.

Growing up in Åkra IF, he played on the senior team from 2013. After two seasons, he was picked up by larger neighbors FK Haugesund, and made his first-tier debut in August 2015 against Start. In the first half of 2016 he was loaned out to Stord IL, and in 2017 he was loaned out to SK Vard Haugesund, whom he joined permanently in 2018. The 2018 season was fruitless, but in the 2019 3. divisjon he managed 23 goals in 24 league games. Myklebust joined the Faroese club 07 Vestur before the 2021 season. After he played 8 matches Myklebust returned to Vard Haugesund in May 2021. He moved up one tier to Åsane ahead of the 2022 season.
