= Daniel Aguilar =

Mexican footballer (born 1998)

Personal information
- Full name: Daniel Aguilar Muñoz
- Date of birth: 6 February 1998 (age 28)
- Place of birth: Guadalajara, Jalisco, Mexico
- Height: 1.78 m (5 ft 10 in)
- Position: Defensive midfielder

Team information
- Current team: Atlético Ottawa
- Number: 5

Youth career
- 2015–2018: Atlas

Senior career*
Years	Team	Apps	(Gls)
2018–2021	Atlas	6	(0)
2020–2021	→ Puebla (loan)	23	(1)
2021–2024	Puebla	35	(0)
2024–2025	Caracas	34	(4)
2026–	Atlético Ottawa	19	(0)
- * Club domestic league appearances and goals as of 7 April 2026

Daniel Aguilar Muñoz (born 6 February 1998) is a Mexican professional footballer who plays as a defensive midfielder for Canadian Premier League club Atlético Ottawa.

== Career statistics ==
As of match played 23 July 2023

Appearances and goals by club, season and competition
Club	Season	League			Cup		Continental		Other		Total	
Club	Season	Division	Apps	Goals	Apps	Goals	Apps	Goals	Apps	Goals	Apps	Goals
Atlas	2018–19	Liga MX	2	0	—		—		—		2	0
Atlas	2019–20	Liga MX	4	0	1	0	—		—		5	0
Atlas	Total		6	0	1	0	—		—		7	0
Puebla (loan)	2020–21	Liga MX	23	1	—		—		—		23	1
Puebla	2021–22	Liga MX	7	0	—		—		—		7	0
Puebla	2022–23	Liga MX	19	0	—		—		—		19	0
Puebla	2023–24	Liga MX	0	0	—		—		1 (Note: Appearance in Leagues Cup)	0	1	0
Puebla	Total		26	0	0	0	0	0	1	0	27	0
Career total			55	1	1	0	0	0	1	0	57	1
