= Nicolas Fleuriau Chateau =

Canadian soccer player (born 2002)

Personal information
- Full name: Nicolas Gerald Gaetan Fleuriau Chateau
- Date of birth: May 21, 2002 (age 24)
- Place of birth: Ottawa, Ontario, Canada
- Height: 5 ft 10 in (1.78 m)
- Position: Forward

Team information
- Current team: Atlético Ottawa
- Number: 21

Youth career
- 2011–2015: Capital United SC
- 2016–2020: West Ottawa SC

College career
Years	Team	Apps	(Gls)
2020–2023	St. John's Red Storm	31	(14)

Senior career*
Years	Team	Apps	(Gls)
2023	Manhattan SC		
2024	Whitecaps FC 2	24	(10)
2024	→ Vancouver Whitecaps FC (loan)	2	(0)
2024–2025	Vancouver Whitecaps FC	2	(0)
2025	→ Whitecaps FC 2 (loan)	1	(0)
2025	→ VPS (loan)	22	(4)
2026	Galway United	3	(0)
2026–	Atlético Ottawa	15	(7)
- * Club domestic league appearances and goals as of October 31, 2026

Nicolas Gerald Gaetan Fleuriau Chateau (born May 21, 2002) is a Canadian soccer player who plays as a striker for Canadian Premier League club Atlético Ottawa.

== Early life ==
Fleuriau Chateau played youth soccer with Capital United and West Ottawa SC.

== College career ==
In 2020, he committed to St. John's University to play for the men's soccer team. On April 10, 2021, he made his collegiate debut against the Georgetown Hoyas. During a spring game in 2022, he tore his ACL, causing him to miss the entire 2022 season. On August 28, 2023, he scored his first collegiate goals, netting a brace in a 2-2 draw with the Rutgers Scarlet Knights. He then scored the only goal in their home opener in the next match against the Monmouth Hawks, subsequently earned his first conference weekly honour for his three-goal week, being named to the Big East Conference Weekly Honor Roll. He earned another Weekly Honor Roll in October and also scored another two braces that season against the Columbia Lions and the Creighton Bluejays, the latter of which earned him Big East Offensive Player of the Week honours. At the end of the season, he was named to the All-Big East First Team, All-East Region Second Team, the Academic All-District Team, and a Second Team Academic All-American. He finished the 2023 season with 14 goals.

== Club career ==
In 2023, he played with Manhattan SC in USL League Two.

At the 2024 MLS SuperDraft, he was selected in the third round (74th overall) by Vancouver Whitecaps FC. In March 2024, he signed with the second team, Whitecaps FC 2, in MLS Next Pro. During the 2024 season, he signed short-term loans with the first team on four occasions. He made his Major League Soccer debut on July 6, 2024 against CF Montréal. In September 2024, he signed a contract with Vancouver Whitecaps FC through the 2025 season, with options for 2026 and 2027.

In April 2025, he was loaned to Finnish Veikkausliiga club Vaasan Palloseura for the 2025 season. On May 2, Fleuriau Chateau scored his first Veikkausliiga goal, the winning goal in a 1–0 home win over Ilves.

On 26 January 2026, he signed for League of Ireland Premier Division club Galway United. Having played just 31 minutes spread over 3 substitute appearances, on 12 July 2026, manager John Caulfield confirmed that Fleuriau Chateau was granted permission to seek other opportunities away from the club. On 14 July, it was announced that Chateau had left the club.

On 24 July 2026, Chateau signed for Canadian Premier League side Atlético Ottawa.

== Career statistics ==
As of 7 November 2026

Appearances and goals by club, season and competition
Club	Season	League			National cup		Continental		Other		Total	
Club	Season	Division	Apps	Goals	Apps	Goals	Apps	Goals	Apps	Goals	Apps	Goals
Whitecaps FC 2	2024	MLS Next Pro	24	10	–		–		1	0	25	10
Vancouver Whitecaps FC (loan)	2024	MLS	2	0	0	0	0	0	0	0	2	0
Vancouver Whitecaps FC	2025	MLS	2	0	0	0	0	0	–		2	0
Vancouver Whitecaps FC	Total		4	0	0	0	0	0	0	0	4	0
Whitecaps FC 2 (loan)	2025	MLS Next Pro	1	0	0	0	–		–		3	0
VPS (loan)	2025	Veikkausliiga	22	4	3	3	–		0	0	25	7
Galway United	2026	LOI Premier Division	3	0	0	0	–		–		3	0
Atlético Ottawa	2026	CPL	15	7	0	0	–		–		0	0
Career total			67	21	3	3	0	0	1	0	59	17
