= Miguel Arilla =

Spanish footballer (born 2003)

Personal information
- Full name: Miguel Arilla Guinot
- Date of birth: 2 June 2003 (age 23)
- Place of birth: Province of Castellón, Spain
- Height: 1.73 m (5 ft 8 in)
- Position: Midfielder

Team information
- Current team: HFX Wanderers
- Number: 23

Youth career
- –2015: Onda
- 2015–2018: Castellón
- 2019–2022: Valencia

College career
Years	Team	Apps	(Gls)
2023–2025	Creighton Bluejays	47	(14)

Senior career*
Years	Team	Apps	(Gls)
2022–2023	Valencia	0	(0)
2022–2023	→ Torrent (loan)		
2026–	HFX Wanderers	10	(1)
- * Club domestic league appearances and goals

Miguel Arilla Guinot (born 2 June 2003) is a Spanish professional footballer who plays as a midfielder for HFX Wanderers of the Canadian Premier League.

== Early life ==
Arilla was born on 9 January 2003. Born in Province of Castellón, Spain, he started playing football at the age of five. Growing up, he attended Creighton University in the United States.

== Career ==
As a youth player, Arilla joined the youth academy of Spanish side Onda. Following his stint there, he joined the youth academy of Spanish side Castellón in 2015. Four years later, he joined the youth academy of Spanish La Liga side Valencia and was promoted to the club's senior team in 2022, where he made zero league appearances and scored zero goals.

Ahead of the 2022–23 season, he was sent on loan to Spanish side Torrent. Spanish news website Esportbase Media wrote in 2023 that "his start in the league was very positive. [manager] Alejandro Esteve placed a great deal of trust in the player... and proof of this was that he started six consecutive matches from the first game of the season... leaving a very positive impression... he had been one of the standout players in Group VI of the Tercera RFEF" while playing for the club. During January 2026, he signed for Canadian side Atlético Ottawa.
