= Caniggia Elva =

Saint Lucian footballer (born 1996)

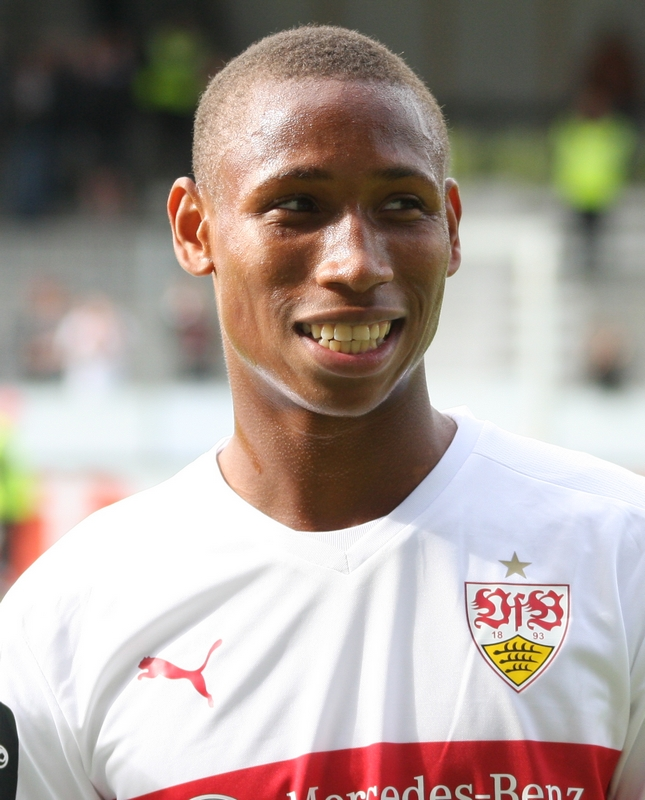
- Elva with VfB Stuttgart II in 2015

Personal information
- Full name: Caniggia Ginola Elva
- Date of birth: 14 July 1996 (age 30)
- Place of birth: Vieux Fort, Saint Lucia
- Height: 1.78 m (5 ft 10 in)
- Position: Midfielder

Team information
- Current team: Cavalry FC
- Number: 14

Youth career
- 2007–2014: Calgary South West United
- 2014: VfB Stuttgart

Senior career*
Years	Team	Apps	(Gls)
2014–2015	VfB Stuttgart	0	(0)
2014–2018	VfB Stuttgart II	57	(7)
2015	→ Strasbourg (loan)	0	(0)
2018–2019	Würzburger Kickers	17	(4)
2019–2022	FC Ingolstadt 04	67	(8)
2023–2024	Rot-Weiß Erfurt	34	(6)
2025–	Cavalry FC	43	(9)

International career^{‡}
2017	Canada U23	2	(1)
2023–	Saint Lucia	19	(8)
- * Club domestic league appearances and goals as of October 25, 2026 ‡ National team caps and goals as of October 3, 2026

Caniggia Ginola Elva (born 14 July 1996) is a Saint Lucian professional footballer who plays as a midfielder for Canadian Premier League club Cavalry FC and the Saint Lucia national team.

Born in Saint Lucia, he represented Canada at youth level since 2017. He moved to Canada at an early age and holds dual-citizenship.

== Early life ==
Elva was born in the Caribbean island of St. Lucia in Vieux Fort, before moving to Canada at the age of 11. He began playing youth soccer with Calgary South West United. When he was 17, he received a tryout with English club Arsenal. After Arsenal decided not to sign him, he went on trial with German Bundesliga side VfB Stuttgart in November 2013, joining them for a month, before returning and signing with them officially on his 18th birthday.

== Club career ==
=== VfB Stuttgart ===
In July 2014, his 18th birthday, he signed a four-year contract with VfB Stuttgart after tryouts with other teams, among them English Premier League football club Arsenal, Spanish club FC Barcelona and Portuguese club SL Benfica. However, due to Elva not able gaining Canadian citizenship, he wasn't granted permission to play neither for Stuttgart's reserve team in the 3. Liga nor their youth team in Under 19 Bundesliga. As a result of this he did not gain any match practice as he was not ready for the club's first team.

==== Loan to Strasbourg ====
In February 2015, he was loaned to French third-tier club RC Strasbourg until the end of the season.

=== VfB Stuttgart II ===
For the 2015–16 season Elva joined the squad of VfB Stuttgart II. He made his debut for VfB II on 29 August 2015 against Rot-Weiß Erfurt. Elva scored his first goal for VfB Stuttgart II on 26 February 2016 against Hallescher FC. After making 57 appearances over three seasons with the second team, he was released by Stuttgart in July 2018.

=== Würzburger Kickers ===
Elva signed with 3. Liga club Würzburger Kickers on 4 September 2018. With the Kickers, he won the 2019 Bavarian Cup. Elva would score 4 goals and add 2 assists during an injury plagued 2018–19 season. After the season, he rejected an offer to extend his contract with the club.

=== FC Ingolstadt 04 ===
After one year with Würzburger Kickers, Elva signed a two-year contract with fellow 3. Liga side FC Ingolstadt 04.

=== Rot-Weiß Erfurt ===
In January 2023, Elva joined Regionalliga club Rot-Weiß Erfurt.

=== Cavalry FC ===
In February 2025, Elva signed with Canadian Premier League club Cavalry for the 2025 season. On April 26, 2025, he scored his first goal for the club in a 3–1 loss against Atlético Ottawa.

== International career ==
=== Youth ===
Elva is eligible for St. Lucia, where he was born. He has however indicated that he would like to represent Canada at international level instead, where he was raised. In March 2017 it was announced that Elva was added to the Canadian Under-23 squad for matches against Qatar and Uzbekistan in Qatar later that month. Elva made his U-23 debut and scored against Uzbekistan in a 1–0 victory on 25 March 2017.

=== Senior ===
Elva was called up to the Canadian senior team for a friendly against El Salvador on 29 September 2017. In June 2021 Elva was included in Canada's 60-man preliminary roster for the 2021 CONCACAF Gold Cup.

In October 2023, Elva was called up to the Saint Lucia national team for a set of 2023–24 CONCACAF Nations League matches. He scored on his debut, a 2–1 win over Guadeloupe on 12 October 2023.

== Personal life ==
His father, Titus "Titi" Elva, is a former national striker for St. Lucia and his uncle, Olivier Elva, is also a former national defender for St. Lucia. His first and middle names Caniggia and Ginola are homages to former Argentine international player Claudio Caniggia and former French player David Ginola.

== Career statistics ==
=== Club ===
As of November 21, 2026

Appearances and goals by club, season and competition
Club	League	Season	League		Cup		Continental		Other		Total	
Club	League	Season	Apps	Goals	Apps	Goals	Apps	Goals	Apps	Goals	Apps	Goals
VfB Stuttgart II	3. Liga	2015–16	21	1	–		–		–		21	1
VfB Stuttgart II	Regionalliga	2016–17	18	3	–		–		–		18	3
VfB Stuttgart II	Regionalliga	2017–18	18	3	–		–		–		18	3
VfB Stuttgart II	Total		57	7	0	0	0	0	0	0	57	7
Würzburger Kickers	3. Liga	2018–19	17	4	0	0	–		–		17	4
FC Ingolstadt 04	3. Liga	2019–20	33	3	1	0	–		2 (Note: Appearance(s) in Promotion Playoffs)	0	36	3
FC Ingolstadt 04	3. Liga	2020–21	34	5	1	0	–		2	0	37	5
FC Ingolstadt 04	2. Bundesliga	2021–22	0	0	0	0	–		0	0	0	0
FC Ingolstadt 04	Total		67	8	2	0	0	0	4	0	73	8
Rot-Weiß Erfurt	Regionalliga	2022–23	10	0	0	0	–		–		10	0
Rot-Weiß Erfurt	Regionalliga	2023–24	24	6	0	0	–		–		24	6
Rot-Weiß Erfurt	Total		34	6	0	0	0	0	0	0	34	6
Cavalry FC	Canadian Premier League	2025	18	4	2	1	2	0	3	0	25	5
Cavalry FC	Canadian Premier League	2026	25	5	3	0	0	0	3	1	31	6
Cavalry FC	Total		43	9	5	1	2	0	6	1	56	11
Career total			218	34	7	1	2	0	10	1	237	36

=== International ===
As of match played October 3, 2026

Appearances and goals by national team and year
Saint Lucia
Year	Apps	Goals
2023	4	1
2024	8	4
2025	4	3
2026	3	1
Total	19	9

Scores and results list Saint Lucia'a goal tally first, score column indicates score after each Elva goal.

List of international goals scored by Caniggia Elva
No.	Date	Venue	Opponent	Score	Result	Competition
1	12 October 2023	Daren Sammy Cricket Ground, Gros Islet, Saint Lucia	Guadeloupe	1–1	2–1	2023–24 CONCACAF Nations League B
2	6 June 2024	Wildey Turf, Wildey, Barbados	Haiti	1–0	1–2	2026 FIFA World Cup qualification
3	6 September 2024	Kirani James Athletic Stadium, St. George's, Grenada	Curaçao	2–0	2–1	2024–25 CONCACAF Nations League B
4	11 October 2024	Daren Sammy Cricket Ground, Gros Islet, Saint Lucia	Saint Martin	1–1	2–1	2024–25 CONCACAF Nations League B
5	11 October 2024	Daren Sammy Cricket Ground, Gros Islet, Saint Lucia	Saint Martin	2–1	2–1	2024–25 CONCACAF Nations League B
6	10 June 2025	Daren Sammy Cricket Ground, Gros Islet, Saint Lucia	Barbados	1–1	2–1	2026 FIFA World Cup qualification
7	10 June 2025	Daren Sammy Cricket Ground, Gros Islet, Saint Lucia	Barbados	2–1	2–1	2026 FIFA World Cup qualification
8	15 November 2025	Estadio Cibao, Santiago de los Caballeros, Dominican Republic	Saint Vincent and the Grenadines	1–2	1–3	2025–26 CONCACAF Series
