= Emiliano García =

Mexican footballer (born 2003)

Personal information
- Date of birth: 25 November 2003 (age 22)
- Place of birth: Álvaro Obregón, Mexico City, Mexico
- Height: 1.78 m (5 ft 10 in)
- Position: Forward

Team information
- Current team: Atlético Ottawa (on loan from Atlético San Luis)
- Number: 7

Youth career
- 2018–2020: Puebla
- 2021–2022: → Villarreal (loan)
- 2025: Atlético San Luis

Senior career*
Years	Team	Apps	(Gls)
2019–2024	Puebla	4	(0)
2025–	Atlético San Luis	0	(0)
2026–	→ Atlético Ottawa (loan)	19	(6)

International career^{‡}
2021	Mexico U19	1	(0)
- * Club domestic league appearances and goals as of 17 May 2026 ‡ National team caps and goals as of 9 October 2021

Emiliano García Escudero (born 25 November 2003) is a Mexican professional footballer who plays as a forward for Atlético Ottawa in the Canadian Premier League, on loan from Atlético San Luis.

== Career statistics ==
=== Club ===
As of 21 September 2022

Club	Season	League			Cup		Continental		Other		Total	
Club	Season	Division	Apps	Goals	Apps	Goals	Apps	Goals	Apps	Goals	Apps	Goals
Puebla	2019–20	Liga MX	1	0	–		–		–		1	0
Puebla	2022–23	Liga MX	2	0	–		–		–		2	0
Puebla	2023–24	Liga MX	1	0	–		–		–		1	0
Career total			4	0	0	0	0	0	0	0	4	0
