= Sergei Kozlovskiy =

Canadian soccer player (born 2008)

Personal information
- Full name: Sergei Kozlovskiy
- Date of birth: June 18, 2008 (age 18)
- Place of birth: Montréal, Québec, Canada
- Height: 1.82 m (5 ft 11 1/2 in)
- Position: Defender

Team information
- Current team: Atlético Ottawa
- Number: 84

Youth career
- AS Dynamo Montréal
- 2017–2022: CS Longueuil
- 2021–2025: CF Montréal

Senior career*
Years	Team	Apps	(Gls)
2025–	Atlético Ottawa	37	(0)

International career^{‡}
2023	Canada U15	4	(4)
2023	Canada U17	12	(5)
2024–	Canada U20	14	(3)
- * Club domestic league appearances and goals as of November 7, 2026 ‡ National team caps and goals as of August 8, 2026

Sergei Kozlovskiy (born June 18, 2008) is a Canadian professional soccer player who plays for Atlético Ottawa in the Canadian Premier League.

== Early life ==
Kozlovskiy began playing youth soccer at age three with AS Dynamo Montréal. He later played with CS Longueuil before joining the CF Montréal Academy in 2021. He attended pre-season training camp with the CF Montréal first team in 2024 and 2025. In December 2024, he was invited to train with the academy of Italian club Bologna. In March 2025, he chose to depart the academy to pursue a professional career.

== Club career ==
In March 2025, Kozlovskiy signed an Exceptional Young Talent contract with Atlético Ottawa in the Canadian Premier League. He made his professional debut on April 13, in a 4-1 victory over Vancouver FC.

== International career ==
In August 2023, Kozlovskiy was named to the Canada U15 for the 2023 CONCACAF Boys' Under-15 Championship.

In November 2023, Kozlovskiy was named to the Canada U17 for the 2023 FIFA U-17 World Cup.

In February 2024, he was called up to the Canada U20, at the age of 15, for the 2024 CONCACAF U-20 Championship qualifying tournament. In November 2025, he played with the team at the 2025 FIFA U-17 World Cup.

== Personal life ==
Kozlovskiy is the grandson of Ukrainian retired player Serhiy Pokydin.

== Career statistics ==
As of October 6, 2026

Club	Season	League			Playoffs		Domestic Cup		Continental		Total	
Club	Season	Division	Apps	Goals	Apps	Goals	Apps	Goals	Apps	Goals	Apps	Goals
Atlético Ottawa	2025	Canadian Premier League	21	0	0	0	3	0	—		24	0
Atlético Ottawa	2026	Canadian Premier League	13	0	0	0	3	0	2	0	18	0
Career total			34	0	0	0	6	0	2	0	42	0
