= Gustavo Leal (football manager) =

Brazilian association football manager

- Leal in 2026

Personal information
- Full name: Gustavo José da Silva Leal
- Date of birth: 9 May 1986 (age 40)
- Place of birth: Petrópolis, Brazil

Team information
- Current team: Atlético Ottawa (manager)

Managerial career
- Years: Team
- 2011: Serrano U15
- 2012: Imperial U20
- 2012: Imperial (interim)
- 2012–2013: Imperial
- 2013: Mesquita
- 2013–2014: Quissamã
- 2014–2017: Fluminense U17
- 2018: Šamorín (interim)
- 2018: Šamorín
- 2019: Fluminense U20
- 2019–2021: Brazil U20 (assistant)
- 2021: Brazil U23 (assistant)
- 2022–2023: Atlético San Luis (assistant)
- 2023–2024: Atlético San Luis
- 2025: Everton Viña del Mar
- 2026: Tlaxcala
- 2026–: Atlético Ottawa
Medal record
Men's football
Representing Brazil (as assistant coach)
Olympic Games
| Gold medal – first place | 2020 Tokyo | Team |

Gustavo José da Silva Leal (born 9 May 1986) is a Brazilian professional football coach who currently manages Canadian Premier League club Atlético Ottawa.

== Career ==
=== Early career ===
Born and raised in Petrópolis, Rio de Janeiro, Leal graduated in Physical Education at the Catholic University of Petrópolis, and began working with football in 2006, as a fitness coach. He was in charge of Serrano and Imperial's youth sides, before becoming the head coach of the latter's first team on 6 April 2012; he previously acted as an interim for the side in one match, a 0–0 draw against Sampaio Corrêa-RJ.

After avoiding relegation from the Campeonato Carioca Série B, Leal was kept as head coach for the 2013 season, but the club withdrew from the competition in March. On 3 April 2013, he was appointed in charge of Mesquita, but left in June after suffering relegation.

In October 2013, Leal took over Quissamã for the remaining matches of the year's Copa Rio. He left the club the following 15 February, to join the youth categories of Fluminense. He worked at the club's under-17 squad, before being named interim coach of affiliate side ŠTK Šamorín in Slovakia on 1 March 2018, after Mika Lönnström left.

Confirmed as head coach of Šamorín in July 2018, Leal was replaced by Sanjin Alagić in December, and returned to Fluminense as their under-20 coach.

=== Assistant roles ===
While he was coaching the Fluminense youth team, Leal was invited to join the Brazil national under-20 team, managed by André Jardine, as an assistant. He would subsequently go on to advise the under-23 team, for which he was part of the squad that participated in the 2020 Summer Olympics, winning the gold medal.

In February 2022, after Jardine was appointed as manager of the Mexican team Atlético San Luis, Leal was selected as the club's technical assistant.

=== Atlético San Luis ===
In June 2023, after Jardine was hired as the head coach of Club América, Leal was convinced by Atlético San Luis to remain at the team and become the head coach, being announced as their manager on 20 June. He was sacked on 29 April 2024, after the end of the 2024 Clausura tournament.

=== Everton Viña del Mar ===
On 13 December 2024, Leal moved to Chile and was presented as manager of Everton de Viña del Mar. He was dismissed the following 10 March, after being eliminated in the 2025 Copa Sudamericana and having poor league results.

=== Tlaxcala ===
On 19 January 2026, Leal was announced as the new manager of the Mexican team Tlaxcala F.C., which competes in the Liga de Expansión MX. At the end of the 2025–26 season, he requested to leave the club due to an offer from Atlético Ottawa.

=== Atlético Ottawa ===
On 17 July 2026, Leal signed with the Canadian Premier League team Atlético Ottawa, sister team of Atlético San Luis, which he had managed between 2023 and 2024.

== Managerial statistics ==
As of 17 July 2026

Managerial record by team and tenure
| Team | Nat | From | To | Record | | | | | | | | Ref |
| Team | Nat | From | To | G | W | D | L | GF | GA | GD | Win % | Ref |
|---|---|---|---|---|---|---|---|---|---|---|---|---|
| Imperial (interim) | (Brazil) | 14 February 2012 | 14 February 2012 | 1 | 0 | 1 | 0 | 0 | 0 | +0 | 0.00 | |
| Imperial | (Brazil) | 6 April 2012 | March 2013 | 13 | 4 | 3 | 6 | 17 | 23 | −6 | 30.77 | |
| Mesquita | (Brazil) | 3 April 2013 | June 2013 | 11 | 1 | 1 | 9 | 5 | 19 | −14 | 9.09 | |
| Quissamã | (Brazil) | 4 October 2013 | 15 February 2014 | 5 | 1 | 2 | 2 | 4 | 5 | −1 | 20.00 | |
| Šamorín (interim) | (Slovakia) | 1 March 2018 | 21 July 2018 | 13 | 7 | 3 | 3 | 16 | 13 | +3 | 53.85 | |
| Šamorín | (Slovakia) | 21 July 2018 | 21 December 2018 | 21 | 9 | 4 | 8 | 42 | 29 | +13 | 42.86 | |
| Atlético San Luis | (Mexico) | 20 June 2023 | 29 April 2024 | 41 | 15 | 4 | 22 | 65 | 76 | −11 | 36.59 | |
| Everton Viña del Mar | (Chile) | 13 December 2024 | 10 March 2025 | 8 | 1 | 2 | 5 | 5 | 13 | −8 | 12.50 | |
| Tlaxcala | (Mexico) | 19 January 2026 | 5 June 2026 | 12 | 4 | 5 | 3 | 14 | 13 | +1 | 33.33 | |
| Atlético Ottawa | (Canada) | 17 July 2026 | | 1 | 0 | 1 | 0 | 1 | 1 | +0 | 0.00 | |
| Career total | | | | 126 | 42 | 26 | 58 | 169 | 192 | −23 | 33.33 | — |
