= Daan Klomp =

Dutch footballer (born 1998)

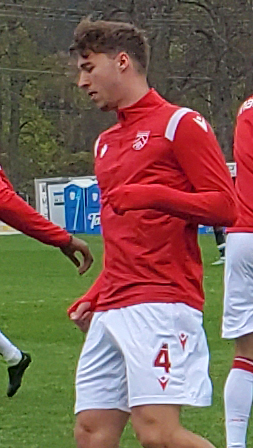
- Klomp in 2022 with Cavalry FC

Personal information
- Date of birth: 10 August 1998 (age 28)
- Place of birth: Wissenkerke, Netherlands
- Height: 1.87 m (6 ft 2 in)
- Positions: Centre back; right back

Team information
- Current team: Cavalry FC
- Number: 4

Youth career
- VV Bevelanders
- JVOZ
- 2014–2017: NAC Breda

Senior career*
| Years | Team | Apps | (Gls) |
| 2017–2020 | NAC Breda | 9 | (0) |
| 2017–2018 | → FC Oss (loan) | 4 | (0) |
| 2019–2020 | → Helmond Sport (loan) | 20 | (0) |
| 2021–2024 | Cavalry FC | 103 | (15) |
| 2025 | RAAL La Louvière | 2 | (0) |
| 2025– | Cavalry FC | 37 | (8) |
- * Club domestic league appearances and goals as of October 25, 2026

Daan Klomp (born 10 August 1998) is a Dutch professional footballer who plays as a defender for Canadian Premier League club Cavalry FC.

== Early life ==
He began playing youth football with VV Bevelanders, before moving to JVOZ (Jeugd Voetbal Opleiding Zeeland), where he transitioned to playing centre-back and defensive midfielder, after previously playing as a forward. Afterwards, he joined the youth system of NAC Breda, where he spent three years before signing a professional contract. During pre-season of the 2016–17 season, he began to train with the first team.

== Club career ==
=== NAC Breda ===
In August 2017, Klomp signed a three-year contract with Eredivisie club NAC Breda. He was then immediately sent on loan to FC Oss in the second-tier Eerste Divisie. He made his debut in a league match on 8 September 2017, as a last minute substitute against FC Dordrecht, and made his first start in a KNVB Cup match on 19 September against Almere City FC. In October 2017, he suffered an ACL injury that kept him out of action for a couple of months. After limited playing time, he was recalled from his loan after six months. For the 2018–19 season, rather than being sent on loan again, he was kept by Breda for the season. He made his official debut for Breda in a KNVB Cup match against RKC Waalwijk on 25 September 2018. On 24 November 2018, he made his Eredivisie debut for Breda against Ajax.

In June 2020, he joined Helmond Sport in the second tier Eerste Divisie on loan. He made his debut in the first game of the season against FC Volendam. In April 2020, he was informed that his contract would not be renewed by Breda upon its expiry at the end of June 2020, ending his time with the club, which included nine appearances with the club as well as two loan stints. Following his release, he contemplated leaving the professional game and pursuing a non-football career.

After his contract expired, he trained with Team VVCS, the football team of the Vereniging van Contractspelers (Association of Contract Players) (VVCS) for professional footballers in the Netherlands without a contract. He also trained with fourth tier club VV Goes. He had neared a deal with a club in Norway, however, it failed to materialize due to the COVID-19 pandemic. Klomp then had a trial in Germany as well as offers from clubs in Sweden, Finland, and a number of Dutch amateur clubs. In November 2020, one of his agents made contact with Canadian Premier League club Cavalry FC, although an agreement could not be reached at that time.

=== Cavalry FC ===
In January 2021, his agents again made contact with Cavalry FC, and this time he signed a contract with the club. However, the start of the season was delayed due to the COVID-19 pandemic, until he finally made his debut in the first game of the season on 27 June 2021 against York United FC. He scored his first goal on 3 August, scoring the winning goal in a 2–1 victory over FC Edmonton. He scored another game-winning goal against Edmonton on 29 September. He was named to the league Team of the Week seven times in 2021 and in July 2021, he was named the CPL Player of the Week for the first time for Week 4 of the season. In late October, he was again named the league Player of the Week. In his first season with Cavalry, he helped them reach the playoff semi-finals, where they were defeated by eventual champions Pacific FC. In January 2022, he re-signed with the club for another season. In his second season, he scored a playoff goal in the first leg of the semi-finals, but his team was again eliminated in the playoff semi-finals, this time against eventual champions Forge FC. In December 2022, he again extended his contract, with a club option for 2024. He has expressed a desire to join a Major League Soccer club after his time with Cavalry.

After spending his first two seasons with the club as primarily a right-back, he shifted back to his regular centre-back position for the 2023 season. That season, he was one of only three players, and the only outfield player, in the league to play every minute in the regular season. At the end of the 2023 season, Klomp won both the CPL Defender of the Year and CPL Player of the Season awards and was named to the CPL Best XI. In August 2024, he was named the CPL Player of the Month. At the end of the 2024 season, he would win the CPL Defender of the Year for the second year in a row, and would be nominated for Player's Player of the year. he departed the club after the 2024 season, following the expiration of his contract.

=== RAAL La Louvière ===
At the start of 2025, Klomp went to train with his former club NAC Breda, before reportedly going on trial with Australian A-League club Adelaide United.

In February 2025, Klomp signed with Belgian club RAAL La Louvière in the second-tier Challenger Pro League. In August 2025, after not being named to the matchday squad for the first two matches of the season in the Belgian Pro League following the club's promotion, his contract was terminated by mutual agreement.

=== Return to Cavalry ===
On 14 August 2025, he returned to Cavalry FC, signing a contract through 2027. On 17 August 2025, he made his first appearance in his second stint, scoring the winning goal in stoppage time in a 5–4 victory over Vancouver FC. In the 2026 season, Klomp would be named the league's Defender of the Year, his third time winning the award.

== Career statistics ==
As of match played November 21, 2026

| Club | Season | League | | | Playoffs | | National cup | | Continental | | Total | |
| Club | Season | Division | Apps | Goals | Apps | Goals | Apps | Goals | Apps | Goals | Apps | Goals |
|---|---|---|---|---|---|---|---|---|---|---|---|---|
| NAC Breda | 2017–18 | Eredivisie | 0 | 0 | — | | 0 | 0 | — | | 0 | 0 |
| NAC Breda | 2018–19 | Eredivisie | 9 | 0 | — | | 1 | 0 | — | | 10 | 0 |
| NAC Breda | Total | | 9 | 0 | 0 | 0 | 1 | 0 | 0 | 0 | 10 | 0 |
| FC Oss (loan) | 2017–18 | Eerste Divisie | 4 | 0 | — | | 1 | 0 | — | | 5 | 0 |
| Helmond Sport (loan) | 2019–20 | Eerste Divisie | 20 | 0 | — | | 0 | 0 | — | | 20 | 0 |
| Cavalry FC | 2021 | Canadian Premier League | 23 | 3 | 1 | 0 | 2 | 0 | — | | 26 | 3 |
| Cavalry FC | 2022 | Canadian Premier League | 25 | 2 | 2 | 1 | 2 | 0 | — | | 29 | 3 |
| Cavalry FC | 2023 | Canadian Premier League | 28 | 4 | 3 | 1 | 1 | 0 | — | | 32 | 5 |
| Cavalry FC | 2024 | Canadian Premier League | 27 | 6 | 2 | 0 | 3 | 0 | 2 | 0 | 34 | 6 |
| Cavalry FC | Total | | 103 | 15 | 8 | 2 | 8 | 0 | 2 | 0 | 121 | 17 |
| RAAL La Louvière | 2024–25 | Challenger Pro League | 2 | 0 | — | | 0 | 0 | — | | 0 | 0 |
| Cavalry FC | 2025 | Canadian Premier League | 10 | 2 | 3 | 0 | 0 | 0 | 0 | 0 | 13 | 2 |
| Cavalry FC | 2026 | Canadian Premier League | 27 | 6 | 3 | 0 | 3 | 2 | 0 | 0 | 33 | 8 |
| Cavalry FC | Total | | 37 | 8 | 6 | 0 | 3 | 2 | 0 | 0 | 46 | 10 |
| Career total | | | 175 | 23 | 14 | 2 | 12 | 2 | 2 | 0 | 204 | 27 |

== Honours ==
Cavalry FC

- Canadian Premier League:
  - Champions: 2024
  - Regular season: 2023

=== Individual ===
- Canadian Premier League Defender of the Year: 2023, 2024, 2026
- Canadian Premier League Player of the Year: 2023
