= ATCO Field =

Soccer stadium near Calgary, Alberta, Canada

- Spruce Meadows
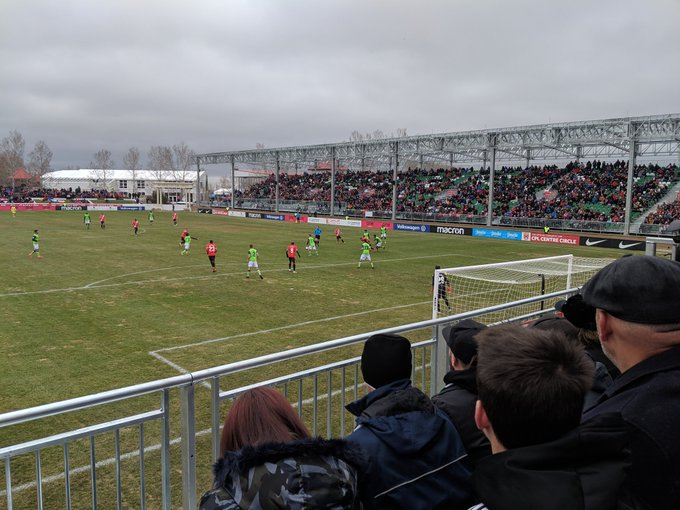
- View from Section 203 in 2019
- Interactive map of ATCO Field
- Location: Foothills County, Alberta, Canada
- Coordinates: 50.8837°N 114.0988°W
- Owner: Margaret Southern (Spruce Meadows Sports & Entertainment)
- Operator: The Southern Family
- Capacity: 6,000
- Surface: Grass
- Field size: 74 by 115 yards (68 m × 105 m)

Construction
- Opened: April 2019

Tenant
- Cavalry FC (CPL 2019–present)

Website
- sprucemeadows.com

ATCO Field is a soccer stadium at Spruce Meadows in Foothills County, Alberta, Canada. It is home to Cavalry FC of the Canadian Premier League. The venue (formerly known as Meadows on the Green) also serves as the home for several equestrian events spanning two to four weeks per year. ATCO, the Canadian corporation from which the stadium gets its name, is also owned by the Southern family.

== History ==
In May 2018, it was announced that the Southern family had purchased a team in the nascent Canadian Premier League and would begin retro-fitting a portion of Spruce Meadows to construct a stadium for that purpose. By July of that year, construction of the venue commenced at the "Meadows on the Green" facility, including the construction of a 4,500-seat covered grandstand on the east side and 1,500 seats combined on the north and south ends. The stadium utilizes a modular design which can be easily expanded with demand in the future and was privately funded. The team predicted that the stadium experience would be, "one of the most unique professional soccer experiences in Canada—if not the world."

The first match was played at ATCO Field on April 27, 2019, while construction was still ongoing. Cavalry FC beat Calgary Foothills FC of USL League Two 1–0 in its final preseason friendly.

On May 4, 2019, Cavalry FC officially opened the stadium in its inaugural CPL match, an eventual 2–1 victory over York9 FC in snowy conditions. The drainage and final seating were installed shortly before the inaugural match but the roof over the grandstand was not expected to be fully installed until the end of May 2019 because of record-cold temperatures in the area.

Following the first match at the stadium and prior to the second, Cavalry FC ownership and management scrambled to correct traffic problems which resulted in many fans missing the first half of the premier match. Congestion problems caused by ongoing road construction on Alberta Highway 22X was identified as the primary cause. As a result, team ownership began offering free shuttles from the nearby public transportation station as a solution. As of 2023, these shuttles are no longer running, although a local lounge in Calgary's far south is offering a shuttle service from their establishment.

Prior to the 2021 CPL season, the club announced that it had invested an additional 9 million CAD to add permanent floodlighting to the stadium in addition to resodding the surface. This lighting replaced temporary lighting solutions which were criticized following Cavalry's 2019 Canadian Championship match against the Montreal Impact. While the stadium was not in use because of the COVID-19 pandemic, ownership also upgraded water and sewage lines at the stadium.

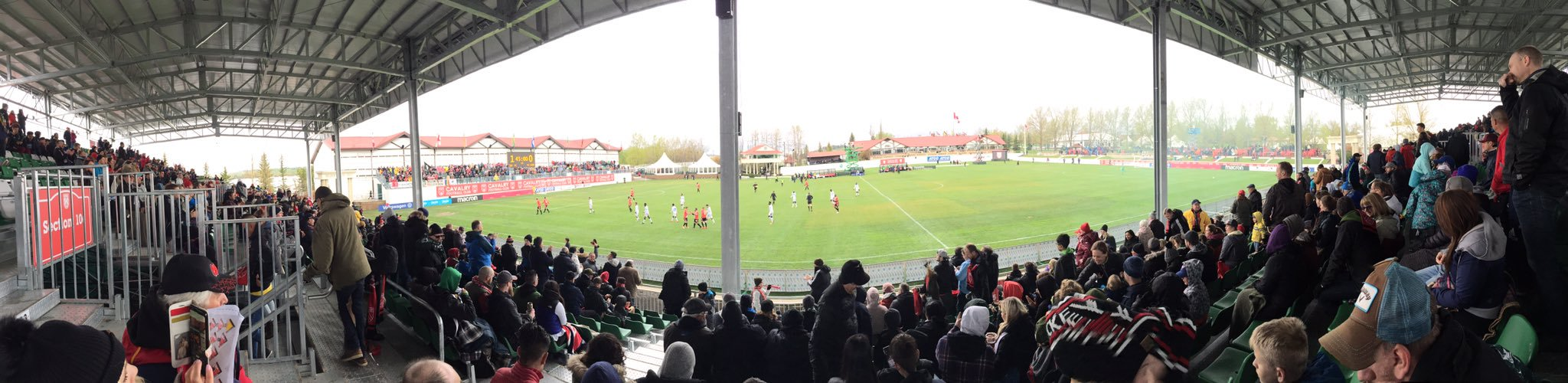
Panoramic view of the stadium and field

== See also ==
- List of Canadian Premier League stadiums
