= 2023 Vancouver FC season =

Vancouver FC
2023 season
- President: Rob Friend
- Head coach: Afshin Ghotbi
- Stadium: Willoughby Community Park Stadium
- Canadian Premier League: 7th
- CPL playoffs: Did not qualify
- Canadian Championship: Preliminary round
- Top goalscorer: League: Gabriel Bitar; Shaan Hundal (6 each); All: Gabriel Bitar; Shaan Hundal (6 each)
- Highest home attendance: 6,177 vs. Cavalry FC (May 7)
- Lowest home attendance: 2,099 vs. HFX Wanderers FC (September 23)
- Average home league attendance: 2,790
- Biggest win: 2–0 vs. Forge FC (Home, June 20, CPL)
- Biggest defeat: 0–5 vs. Atlético Ottawa (Home, May 13, CPL)
Home colours	Away colours

The 2023 Vancouver FC season was the first season in the history of Vancouver FC. In addition to the Canadian Premier League, the club also competed in the Canadian Championship.

For their inaugural season, Vancouver FC appointed Afshin Ghotbi as the club's new head coach on November 2, 2022.

== Squad ==
As of September 5, 2023

No.	Player	Nationality	Position(s)	Date of birth (age)	Previous club
Goalkeepers
1	Callum Irving	(Canada)	GK	March 16, 1993 (aged 30)	(Canada) Pacific FC
21	Jeremy Zielinski	(United States)	GK	January 1, 1999 (aged 24)	(United States) Hawaii Pacific Sharks
Defenders
2	Kadin Chung (injured)	(Canada)	RB	September 5, 1998 (aged 25)	(Canada) Toronto FC
3	Rocco Romeo	(Canada)	CB	March 25, 2000 (aged 23)	(Canada) Valour FC
4	Ibrahim Bakare	(England)	CB	May 7, 2002 (aged 21)	(England) Cheshunt F.C.
12	Tyler Crawford	(Canada)	LB	March 9, 2004 (aged 19)	(United States) Michigan State Spartans
20	Anthony White	(Canada)	CB	August 1, 2003 (aged 20)	(Canada) Toronto Varsity Blues
25	James Cameron	(Canada)	RB	January 24, 2005 (aged 18)	(Canada) Unity FC
Midfielders
6	Renan Garcia	(Brazil)	CM	June 19, 1986 (aged 37)	(Brazil) Comercial
8	Nima Moazeni Zadeh	(Iran)	CM / AM	July 5, 1997 (aged 26)	(Canada) Capilano Blues
11	Gabriel Bitar	(Lebanon)	AM / CF	August 23, 1998 (aged 25)	(Canada) FC Edmonton
13	Vasco Fry	(Peru)	CM	July 30, 2000 (aged 23)	(Canada) Whitecaps FC 2
14	Nicky Gyimah	(Ghana)	RW	May 27, 2003 (aged 20)	(England) Slough Town
16	Elliot Simmons	(Canada)	CM	February 5, 1998 (aged 25)	(Canada) Cavalry FC
17	Min-jae Kwak	(South Korea)	LW	August 25, 2000 (aged 23)	(United States) Syracuse Pulse
19	Mikaël Cantave	(Haiti)	AM / CF	October 25, 1996 (aged 27)	(Canada) Cavalry FC
24	Lennon Thompson	(Canada)	CM	January 1, 2005 (aged 18)	(Canada) Unity FC
26	Taryck Tahid	(Canada)	AM / CF	April 20, 2007 (aged 16)	(Canada) VanCity Pro FA
33	Ivan Mejia	(Colombia)	CM	May 9, 2001 (aged 22)	(Canada) TSS FC Rovers
Forwards
7	Nathaniel St. Louis	(Canada)	CF	December 5, 2000 (aged 23)	(United States) UAB Blazers
9	Alejandro Díaz	(Mexico)	FW	January 27, 1996 (aged 27)	(Norway) Sogndal
10	Shaan Hundal	(Canada)	CF	July 14, 1999 (aged 24)	(United States) Inter Miami CF II
15	Mouhamadou Kane	(Canada)	CF	October 12, 2003 (aged 20)	(Canada) York United
18	Ameer Kinani	(Iraq)	CF	April 20, 2001 (aged 22)	(Canada) TMU Bold

=== Staff ===
Executive
President	(Canada) Rob Friend
Coaching staff
Head coach	(Iran) (United States) Afshin Ghotbi
Assistant coach	(United States) Arez Ardalani
Assistant coach	(Canada) Niall Thompson
Goalkeeping coach	(Canada) Mark Village
Equipment manager	(Canada) Cortlin Tonn
Manager of football operations	(Canada) Jeevin Kang

== Transfers ==
=== In ===
No.	Pos.	Player	From club	Fee/notes	Date	Source
	GK	(Canada) Callum Irving	(Canada) Pacific FC	Free	December 14, 2022	
	MF	(Canada) Elliot Simmons	(Canada) Cavalry FC	Free	December 21, 2022	
	FW	(Canada) Mouhamadou Kane	(Canada) York United	Undisclosed	December 22, 2022	
	DF	(Canada) Kahlil John-Wentworth	(Canada) Simcoe County Rovers	Free	January 12, 2023	
	FW	(Canada) Nathaniel St. Louis	(United States) UAB Blazers	Free	January 13, 2023	
	DF	(Canada) Rocco Romeo	(Canada) Valour FC	Free	January 16, 2023	
	MF	(Lebanon) Gabriel Bitar	(Canada) FC Edmonton	Free	January 18, 2023	
	MF	(Guyana) Marcus Simmons	(Canada) FC Edmonton	Free	January 25, 2023	
	FW	(Canada) Shaan Hundal	(United States) Inter Miami CF II	Free	January 31, 2023	
	DF	(Canada) Tyler Crawford	(United States) Michigan State Spartans	Free	February 2, 2023	
	GK	(United States) Jeremy Zielinski	(United States) Hawaii Pacific Sharks	Free	February 23, 2023	
	DF	(Belize) Eugene Martínez	(United States) Cal Poly Pomona Broncos	Free	February 23, 2023	
	MF	(Iran) Nima Moazeni Zadeh	(Canada) Capilano Blues	Free	February 23, 2023	
	MF	(Canada) Maël Henry	(Canada) CF Montréal Academy	Free	February 28, 2023	
	MF	(Mexico) Gael Sandoval	(Mexico) Guadalajara	Free	March 1, 2023	
	DF	(Canada) Kadin Chung	(Canada) Toronto FC	Free	March 6, 2023	
	FW	(Ghana) Nicky Gyimah	(England) Slough Town	Free	March 8, 2023	
	FW	(South Korea) Min-jae Kwak	(United States) Syracuse Pulse	Free	March 8, 2023	
	DF	(England) Ibrahim Bakare	(England) Cheshunt F.C.	Free	March 10, 2023	
	DF	(Canada) Anthony White	(Canada) Toronto Varsity Blues	Selected 1st overall in the 2023 CPL–U Sports Draft, signed a Standard Player Contract	March 22, 2023	
	FW	(Iraq) Ameer Kinani	(Canada) TMU Bold	Selected 2nd overall in the 2023 CPL–U Sports Draft, signed a CPL-U SPORTS contract	March 22, 2023	
	FW	(France) Emmanuel Robe	(England) Romford F.C.	Free	April 14, 2023	
	DF	(Canada) James Cameron	(Canada) Unity FC	Signed to a development contract, later converted to an Exceptional Young Talent contract	May 3, 2023	
	MF	(Canada) Lennon Thompson	(Canada) Unity FC	Signed to a development contract	May 3, 2023	
	FW	(Canada) Kourosh Jamshidi	(Canada) Unity FC	Signed to a development contract	May 3, 2023	
	MF	(Canada) Taryck Tahid	(Canada) VanCity Pro FA	Free	May 6, 2023	
	MF	(Haiti) Mikaël Cantave	(Canada) Cavalry FC	Free	June 29, 2023	
	MF	(Brazil) Renan Garcia	(Brazil) Comercial	Free	July 13, 2023	
	MF	(Colombia) Ivan Mejia	(Canada) TSS FC Rovers	Free	August 5, 2023	

==== Loans in ====
No.	Pos.	Player	Loaned from	Fee/notes	Date	Source
	MF	(Mexico) Cristian Mares	(Mexico) Club Puebla	Season-long loan	February 28, 2023	
	GK	(Canada) Trevor Schneider	(Canada) Altitude FC	Short-term relief player	July 7, 2023	
	FW	(Mexico) Alejandro Díaz	(Norway) Sogndal	One year loan	July 7, 2023	
	MF	(Peru) Vasco Fry	(Canada) Whitecaps FC 2	Loaned until end of season	August 3, 2023	

==== Draft picks ====
Vancouver FC selected the following players in the 2023 CPL–U Sports Draft. Draft picks are not automatically signed to the team roster. Only those who are signed to a contract will be listed as transfers in.

Round	Selection	Pos.	Player	Nationality	University
1	1	DF	Anthony White	Canada	Toronto
1	2	FW	Ameer Kinani	Iraq	TMU

=== Out ===
==== Transferred out ====
No.	Pos.	Player	To club	Fee/notes	Date	Source
	MF	(Mexico) Cristian Mares	(Mexico) Club Puebla	Loan terminated	April 14, 2023	
19	MF	(Canada) Maël Henry	(Canada) Cavalry FC		June 29, 2023	
13	FW	(France) Emmanuel Robe		Contract terminated by mutual consent	June 29, 2023	
10	MF	(Mexico) Gael Sandoval	(Mexico) UdeG	Contract terminated by mutual consent	July 13, 2023	
5	DF	(Belize) Eugene Martínez		Contract terminated by mutual consent	August 3, 2023	
23	DF	(Canada) Kahlil John-Wentworth		Contract terminated by mutual consent	August 3, 2023	
22	MF	(Guyana) Marcus Simmons	(Malta) Valletta F.C.		September 5, 2023	

== Competitions ==
Matches are listed in Langley local time: Pacific Daylight Time (UTC−7)

=== Pre-season friendlies ===
February 18, 2023 Friendly	UBC Thunderbirds	0–2	Vancouver FC	Vancouver, British Columbia
		Report		Stadium: Thunderbird Stadium

February 24, 2023 Friendly	Vancouver FC	2–1	Unity FC	Langley, British Columbia
				Stadium: Langley Events Centre

March 1, 2023 Friendly	Whitecaps FC 2	1–3	Vancouver FC	Victoria, British Columbia
	Becher 59'	Report	Bitar; Kane; Kinani	Stadium: Centennial Stadium, University of Victoria
Note: The match was played in three 45 minute halves. The score at the end of the first two halves was Whitecaps 2 1-0 Vancouver FC

March 6, 2023 Friendly	BB5 United	0–2	Vancouver FC	Surrey, British Columbia
		Report	Kinani	Stadium: Newton Athletic Park

March 13, 2023 Friendly	Portland Timbers 2	2–2	Vancouver FC	Beaverton, Oregon
	Goal	Report	Kinani; Gyimah
Note: The match was played in three 45 minute halves.

March 18, 2023 Friendly	Vancouver FC	2–2	Valour FC	Langley, British Columbia
	Hundal; Romeo		Siaj; Polisi	Stadium: Willoughby Community Park Stadium; Referee: Carly Shaw-MacLaren

March 25, 2023 Friendly	FC Tigers Vancouver	0–1	Vancouver FC	Richmond, British Columbia
7:30 PM		Report	Sandoval 37' (pen.)	Stadium: Minoru Park; Referee: Niko Jecanski

April 3, 2023 Friendly	Vancouver FC	2–0	TSS FC Rovers	Langley, British Columbia
12:00 PM	Hundal; Henry	Report		Stadium: Willoughby Community Park Stadium; Referee: Seyed-Mohammad Mohseni

April 8, 2023 Friendly	Altitude FC	1–1	Vancouver FC	North Vancouver, British Columbia
3:00 PM	Chavula 84'	Report	Hundal 47' (pen.)	Stadium: Fen Burdett Stadium; Referee: Niko Jecanski

=== Overview ===
Competition	Starting round	Final position	Record							
Competition	Starting round	Final position	Pld	W	D	L	GF	GA	GD	Win %
Canadian Premier League	Matchday 1	Seventh	28	8	5	15	28	50	−22	28.57
Canadian Championship	First round	First round	1	0	0	1	0	1	−1	0.00
Total			29	8	5	16	28	51	−23	27.59

Last updated: October 6, 2023
Source: Competitions

=== Canadian Premier League ===
==== Table ====
Pos	Team	Pld	W	D	L	GF	GA	GD	Pts	Playoff qualification
1	Cavalry (S)	28	16	7	5	46	27	+19	55	First semifinal
2	Forge (C)	28	11	9	8	39	32	+7	42 (Note: Tie resolved by away goal differential; Forge: +4, Wanderers: −2)	First semifinal
3	HFX Wanderers	28	11	9	8	39	32	+7	42	Quarterfinal
4	Pacific	28	11	7	10	42	35	+7	40	Play-in round
5	York United	28	11	5	12	35	44	−9	38	Play-in round
6	Atlético Ottawa	28	10	6	12	38	34	+4	36	
7	Vancouver	28	8	5	15	28	50	−22	29	
8	Valour	28	6	8	14	25	38	−13	26	

Source: CanPL
Rules for classification: 1) Points; 2) Total wins; 3) Goal difference; 4) Goals scored; 5) Away goal differential; 6) Away goals scored; 7) Home goal differential; 8) Home goals scored; 9) Total minutes played by U-21 players; 10) Coin toss (2 teams tied) or drawing of lots (3+ teams tied).
(C) Champion (qualified to Champions Cup); (S) CPL Shield winner (qualified to Champions Cup)

==== Results by match ====
Match	1	2	3	4	5	6	7	8	9	10	11	12	13	14	15	16	17	18	19	20	21	22	23	24	25	26	27	28
Result	L	W	D	D	L	D	D	L	L	L	W	L	L	W	L	L	L	D	L	W	L	L	W	L	W	W	W	L
Position	7	3	3	4	5	6	6	7	8	8	8	8	8	8	8	8	8	8	8	8	8	8	8	8	7	7	7	7

Updated to match(es) played on October 6, 2023. Source: #Matches
W = Win; D = Draw; L = Loss

==== Matches ====
April 15 1	Pacific FC	1–0	Vancouver FC	Langford, British Columbia
4:00pm PT	Aparicio 81'	Report	Chung (yellow card) 45+2'; Kwak (yellow card) 72'	Stadium: Starlight Stadium; Attendance: 4,825

April 22 2	York United FC	1–2	Vancouver FC	Toronto, Ontario
1:00pm ET	Voytsekhovskyy 35'	Report	Hundal 6', (yellow card) 42'; Sandoval 18' (pen.); Moazeni Zadeh (yellow card) 50'; Romeo (yellow card) 70'; Kinani (yellow card) 81'; Kwak (yellow card) 82'; Gyimah (yellow card) 90+5'	Stadium: York Lions Stadium; Attendance: 822; Referee: Ben Hoskins

April 29 3	HFX Wanderers FC	1–1	Vancouver FC	Halifax, Nova Scotia
3:00pm AT	Collomb 12'; Ferrazzo (yellow card) 41'; Callegari (yellow card) 57'; Fernandez (yellow card) 89'	Report	Martínez (yellow card) 40'; Hundal 45+2'; Moazeni Zadeh (yellow card) 53'	Stadium: Wanderers Grounds; Attendance: 6,413; Referee: Marie-Soleil Beaudoin

May 7 4 Home opener	Vancouver FC	1–1	Cavalry FC	Langley Township, British Columbia
4:00pm PT	Martínez (yellow card) 7'; Romeo (red card) 29'; Hundal 52'	Report	Cantave 46'	Stadium: Willoughby Community Park; Attendance: 6,177; Referee: Alain Ruch
Note: Vancouver FC manager Afshin Ghotbi was cautioned (yellow card) in the 45+4th minute.

May 13 5	Vancouver FC	0–5	Atlético Ottawa	Langley Township, British Columbia
6:30pm PT	Sandoval (yellow card) 56'; Kinani (yellow card) 84'	Report	Bassett 8'; Salter 36'; N. Verhoeven (yellow card) 40', (goal) 59'; Singh (yellow card) 42'; Z. Verhoven 71'; Bahous 72'; Shaw (yellow card) 87'	Stadium: Willoughby Community Park; Attendance: 2,824; Referee: Carly Shaw-MacLaren

May 19 6	Forge FC	0–0	Vancouver FC	Hamilton, Ontario
7:00pm ET	Hojabrpour (yellow card) 45'; Metusala (yellow card) 50'	Report	Moazeni Zadeh (yellow card) 47'; Bakare (yellow card) 88'; Robe (yellow card) 90+2'	Stadium: Tim Hortons Field; Attendance: 4,378; Referee: Myriam Marcotte

May 28 7	Vancouver FC	0–0	Valour FC	Langley Township, British Columbia
5:00pm PT	Kwak (yellow card) 23'; Gyimah (yellow card) 78'	Report	Polisi (yellow card) 6'	Stadium: Willoughby Community Park; Attendance: 2,208; Referee: Yusri Rudolf

June 2 8	Vancouver FC	3–6	Pacific FC	Langley Township, British Columbia
7:00pm PT	Kwak 7'; Bakare (yellow card) 9'; Tahid 45+1', (yellow card) 52'; Hundal 87' (pen.)	Report	Didic 3', (yellow card) 86'; Aparicio (yellow card) 19', (goal) 80' (pen.); Heard 24'; Sellouf 66'; Ongaro 68'; Reid (yellow card) 68'; Manneh 90+1'	Stadium: Willoughby Community Park; Attendance: 3,438; Referee: Renzo Villanueva

June 11 9	Cavalry FC	3–1	Vancouver FC	Foothills County, Alberta
3:00pm MT	Bevan 10', 21', (yellow card) 65'; Camargo 28'	Report	Hundal 4'; E. Simmons (yellow card) 46'; Cameron (yellow card) 73'; Romeo (yellow card) 75'	Stadium: ATCO Field; Attendance: 3,762; Referee: David Barrie

June 17 10	Atlético Ottawa	1–0	Vancouver FC	Ottawa, Ontario
2:00pm ET	Salter 9'; Singh (yellow card) 61'	Report	Cameron (yellow card) 43'; Bakare (yellow card) 72'; Romeo (yellow card) 82'	Stadium: TD Place Stadium; Attendance: 5,149; Referee: Yusri Rudolf

June 20 11	Vancouver FC	2–0	Forge FC	Langley Township, British Columbia
7:00pm PT	Tahid 35'; Kinani 39'; Moazeni Zadeh (yellow card) 70'; Romeo (yellow card) 81'	Report	Samuel (yellow card) 21'	Stadium: Willoughby Community Park; Attendance: 2,149; Referee: Mo Mohensi

June 25 12	Valour FC	1–0	Vancouver FC	Winnipeg, Manitoba
2:00pm CT	Niyongabire (yellow card) 50'; Gutiérrez 58' (pen.)	Report	M. Simmons (yellow card) 14'; Irving (yellow card) 56'; Thompson (yellow card) 83'	Stadium: IG Field; Attendance: 2,208; Referee: Myriam Marcotte

July 2 13	Vancouver FC	1–2	York United FC	Langley Township, British Columbia
3:00pm PT	Hundal 6'; Bakare (yellow card) 68'; Gyimah (yellow card) 88'	Report	Alou 4'; De Rosario 79'; Adekugbe (yellow card) 87'; Baldisimo (yellow card) 90+2'	Stadium: Willoughby Community Park; Attendance: 2,482; Referee: Ben Hoskins

July 7 14	Vancouver FC	2–1	HFX Wanderers FC	Langley Township, British Columbia
7:00pm PT	Bitar 10', (yellow card) 70'; Cantave 56'; White (yellow card) 73'	Report	Coimbra 11'; Daniels (yellow card) 35'; Campagna (yellow card) 68'; Omar (yellow card) 73'	Stadium: Willoughby Community Park; Attendance: 2,321; Referee: Roberto D'Alesio

July 16 15	Atlético Ottawa	3–1	Vancouver FC	Ottawa, Ontario
2:00pm ET	Acosta 12'; Antinoro 62'; del Campo (yellow card) 90+4'; Haworth 90+5'	Report	Cantave (yellow card) 19'; Díaz 55'; Kwak (yellow card) 90+1'	Stadium: TD Place Stadium; Attendance: 4,160; Referee: Renzo Villanueva

July 22 16	Vancouver FC	1–5	Cavalry FC	Langley Township, British Columbia
4:00pm PT	Martínez (red card) 6'; Díaz 10'; Cameron (yellow card) 15'; Kinani (red card) 67'	Report	Bevan 7' (pen.), (red card) 67'; Klomp 24'; Camargo 37'; Fisk 55'; Musse 84'	Stadium: Willoughby Community Park; Attendance: 2,239; Referee: Mario Alayass

July 28 17	Forge FC	2–0	Vancouver FC	Hamilton, Ontario
7:00pm ET	Sissoko 71'; Pacius 73'; Borges (yellow card) 90+1'	Report	Kwak (yellow card) 53'; Gyimah (yellow card) 90+3'	Stadium: Tim Hortons Field; Attendance: 5,232; Referee: Roberto D'Alesio

August 6 18	Vancouver FC	0–0	Valour FC	Langley Township, British Columbia
2:00pm PT	Bitar (yellow card) 19'; Garcia (yellow card) 36'; Romeo (yellow card) 90+5'	Report	Polisi (yellow card) 26'; Campbell (yellow card) 73'; Haynes (yellow card) 90+7'	Stadium: Willoughby Community Park; Attendance: 2,591; Referee: Renzo Villanueva

August 12 19	HFX Wanderers FC	3–0	Vancouver FC	Halifax, Nova Scotia
4:00pm AT	Morelli 5', 58' (pen.); Rampersad (yellow card) 61'; Ferrin 66'; Ferrazzo (yellow card) 68'	Report	Bitar (yellow card) 58'	Stadium: Wanderers Grounds; Attendance: 6,254; Referee: Ben Hoskins

August 19 20	Vancouver FC	3–2	Pacific FC	Langley Township, British Columbia
1:00pm PT	Cantave 11'; E. Simmons (yellow card) 44'; Fry (yellow card) 52'; Bitar 76', 87'	Report	Mukumbilwa (yellow card) 33'; Didić (yellow card) 41'; Meilleur-Giguère 65'; Daniels 73'	Stadium: Willoughby Community Park; Attendance: 2,363; Referee: Yusri Rudolf

August 25 21	York United FC	2–1	Vancouver FC	Toronto, Ontario
7:30pm ET	Babouli 69' (pen.); Ricci 80'	Report	Bitar 11'; Fry (yellow card) 90+5'	Stadium: York Lions Stadium; Attendance: 1,200; Referee: Fabrizio Stasolla

September 3 22	Vancouver FC	0–3	Forge FC	Langley Township, British Columbia
2:00pm PT	Cantave (yellow card) 51'; Bakare (yellow card) 73'	Report	Pacius 19', 28', 47' (pen.); Poku (red card) 87'	Stadium: Willoughby Community Park; Attendance: 2,378; Referee: Alain Ruch

September 9 23	Vancouver FC	2–1	Atlético Ottawa	Langley Township, British Columbia
7:00pm PT	Cantave 6'; Cameron 90+1'; Bitar (yellow card) 90+5'; Fry (yellow card) 90+6'	Report	Bassett 18'; Iliadis (yellow card) 67'; Verhoeven (yellow card) 80'; Acosta (yellow card) 90+3'	Stadium: Willoughby Community Park; Attendance: 2,163; Referee: Sebastian Noshinravani

September 16 24	Cavalry FC	2–1	Vancouver FC	Foothills County, Alberta
3:00pm MT	Bevan 36' (pen.); White 70' (o.g.)	Report	Fry (yellow card) 56'; Garia 90+2'	Stadium: ATCO Field; Attendance: 4,990; Referee: Marie Soleil Beaudoin

September 20 25	Valour FC	0–1	Vancouver FC	Winnipeg, Manitoba
7:00pm CT		Report	Tahid 78'	Stadium: IG Field; Attendance: 3,303; Referee: Roberto D'Alesio

September 23 26	Vancouver FC	2–1	HFX Wanderers FC	Langley Township, British Columbia
1:00pm PT	Romeo (yellow card) 37'; Fry (yellow card) 50'; Bitar 69'; Nimick 90+5' (o.g.)	Report	Ferrin 42'; Fernandez (yellow card) 47'; Loughrey (yellow card) 61'; Wilson (yellow card) 90'	Stadium: Willoughby Community Park; Attendance: 2,099; Referee: Mathieu Souaré

September 30 27	Pacific FC	1–2	Vancouver FC	Langford, British Columbia
2:00pm PT	Vliet (yellow card) 26'; Daniels (yellow card) 38'; Ongaro 53'; Manneh (yellow card) 65'	Report	Bitar 28'; Cantave (yellow card) 34'; Fry 35'; E. Simmons (yellow card) 54'	Stadium: Starlight Stadium; Attendance: 4,404; Referee: Ben Hoskins

October 6 28	Vancouver FC	1–2	York United FC	Langley Township, British Columbia
7:30pm PT	Garcia (yellow card) 4'; Cantave 39'; Chung (yellow card) 47'; Fry (yellow card) 81'	Report	De Rosario 17', 27'; Ricci (yellow card) 45+2' (red card) 90+5'; Baldisimo (yellow card) 75'; Dos Santos (yellow card) 90+8'	Stadium: Willoughby Community Park; Attendance: 3,622; Referee: Michael Venne

=== Canadian Championship ===
April 19 First round	York United FC	1–0	Vancouver FC	Toronto, Ontario
8:00pm ET	Babouli 6' (pen.), (yellow card) 18'; Ricci (yellow card) 71'; Gee (yellow card) 75'; Giantsopoulos (yellow card) 87'	Report	Bakare (yellow card) 2'; Simmons (yellow card) 33'	Stadium: York Lions Stadium; Attendance: 1,272; Referee: Michael Venne

== Statistics ==
=== Appearances and goals ===
As of October 6, 2023

No.	Pos	Nat	Player	Total		CPL		Canadian Championship	
No.	Pos	Nat	Player	Apps	Goals	Apps	Goals	Apps	Goals
Goalkeepers
1	GK	(Canada) CAN	Callum Irving	28	0	27	0	1	0
21	GK	(United States) USA	Jeremy Zielinski	1	0	1	0	0	0
31	GK	(Canada) CAN	Trevor Schneider	0	0	0	0	0	0
Defenders
2	DF	(Canada) CAN	Kadin Chung	14	0	12+1	0	1	0
3	DF	(Canada) CAN	Rocco Romeo	26	0	25	0	1	0
4	DF	(England) ENG	Ibrahim Bakare	26	0	18+7	0	1	0
5	DF	(Belize) BLZ	Eugene Martínez	12	0	11	0	1	0
12	DF	(Canada) CAN	Tyler Crawford	23	0	14+9	0	0	0
20	DF	(Canada) CAN	Anthony White	20	0	17+3	0	0	0
23	DF	(Canada) CAN	Kahlil John-Wentworth	0	0	0	0	0	0
25	DF	(Canada) CAN	James Cameron	19	1	17+2	1	0	0
Midfielders
6	MF	(Brazil) BRA	Renan Garcia	14	1	14	1	0	0
8	MF	(Iran) IRI	Nima Moazeni Zadeh	14	0	9+4	0	1	0
10	MF	(Mexico) MEX	Gael Sandoval	13	1	9+3	1	1	0
11	MF	(Lebanon) LBN	Gabriel Bitar	26	6	23+2	6	0+1	0
13	MF	(Peru) PER	Vasco Fry	10	1	10	1	0	0
14	MF	(Ghana) GHA	Nicky Gyimah	12	0	2+9	0	0+1	0
16	MF	(Canada) CAN	Elliot Simmons	26	0	24+1	0	1	0
17	MF	(South Korea) KOR	Min-jae Kwak	27	1	13+13	1	1	0
19	MF	(Canada) CAN	Maël Henry	3	0	1+2	0	0	0
19	MF	(Haiti) HAI	Mikaël Cantave	16	4	13+3	4	0	0
22	MF	(Canada) CAN	Marcus Simmons	5	0	2+3	0	0	0
24	MF	(Canada) CAN	Lennon Thompson	3	0	0+3	0	0	0
26	MF	(Canada) CAN	Taryck Tahid	20	3	6+14	3	0	0
33	MF	(Colombia) COL	Ivan Mejia	1	0	0+1	0	0	0
Forwards
7	FW	(Canada) CAN	Nathaniel St. Louis	5	0	1+3	0	0+1	0
9	FW	(Mexico) MEX	Alejandro Díaz	14	2	14	2	0	0
10	FW	(Canada) CAN	Shaan Hundal	29	6	20+8	6	1	0
13	FW	(France) FRA	Emmanuel Robe	5	0	1+3	0	0+1	0
15	FW	(Canada) CAN	Mouhamadou Kane	8	0	2+6	0	0	0
18	FW	(Iraq) IRQ	Ameer Kinani	21	1	2+18	1	1	0
	FW	(Canada) CAN	Kourosh Jamshidi	0	0	0	0	0	0

Source: Competitions

=== Goalscorers ===
As of October 6, 2023

Rank	No.	Pos	Nat	Name	CPL	Canadian Championship	Total
1	10	FW	(Canada)	Shaan Hundal	6	0	6
1	11	MF	(Lebanon)	Gabriel Bitar	6	0	6
3	19	MF	(Haiti)	Mikaël Cantave	4	0	4
4	26	FW	(Canada)	Taryck Tahid	3	0	3
5	9	FW	(Mexico)	Alejandro Díaz	2	0	2
6	6	MF	(Brazil)	Renan Garcia	1	0	1
6	10	MF	(Mexico)	Gael Sandoval	1	0	1
6	13	MF	(Peru)	Vasco Fry	1	0	1
6	17	MF	(South Korea)	Min-jae Kwak	1	0	1
6	18	FW	(Iraq)	Ameer Kinani	1	0	1
6	25	DF	(Canada)	James Cameron	1	0	1
Own Goals					1	0	1
Totals					28	0	28

=== Clean sheets ===
As of October 6, 2023

Rank	No.	Pos	Nat	Name	CPL	Canadian Championship	Total
1	1	GK	(Canada)	Callum Irving	5	0	5
Totals					5	0	5

=== Disciplinary record ===
As of October 6, 2023

No.	Pos	Nat	Player	CPL			Canadian Championship			Total		
No.	Pos	Nat	Player	Yellow card	(yellow card) (yellow-red card)	Red card	Yellow card	(yellow card) (yellow-red card)	Red card	Yellow card	(yellow card) (yellow-red card)	Red card
1	GK	(Canada)	Callum Irving	1	0	0	0	0	0	1	0	0
2	DF	(Canada)	Kadin Chung	2	0	0	0	0	0	2	0	0
3	DF	(Canada)	Rocco Romeo	6	0	1	0	0	0	6	0	1
4	DF	(England)	Ibrahim Bakare	5	0	0	1	0	0	6	0	0
5	DF	(Belize)	Eugene Martínez	2	0	1	0	0	0	2	0	1
6	MF	(Brazil)	Renan Garcia	2	0	0	0	0	0	2	0	0
7	FW	(Canada)	Nathaniel St. Louis	0	0	0	0	0	0	0	0	0
8	MF	(Iran)	Nima Moazeni Zadeh	4	0	0	0	0	0	4	0	0
9	FW	(Mexico)	Alejandro Díaz	0	0	0	0	0	0	0	0	0
10	FW	(Canada)	Shaan Hundal	1	0	0	0	0	0	1	0	0
10	MF	(Mexico)	Gael Sandoval	1	0	0	0	0	0	1	0	0
11	MF	(Lebanon)	Gabriel Bitar	4	0	0	0	0	0	4	0	0
12	DF	(Canada)	Tyler Crawford	0	0	0	0	0	0	0	0	0
13	MF	(Peru)	Vasco Fry	6	0	0	0	0	0	6	0	0
13	FW	(France)	Emmanuel Robe	1	0	0	0	0	0	1	0	0
14	MF	(Ghana)	Nicky Gyimah	4	0	0	0	0	0	4	0	0
15	FW	(Canada)	Mouhamadou Kane	0	0	0	0	0	0	0	0	0
16	MF	(Canada)	Elliot Simmons	3	0	0	1	0	0	4	0	0
17	MF	(South Korea)	Min-jae Kwak	5	0	0	0	0	0	5	0	0
18	FW	(Iraq)	Ameer Kinani	2	0	1	0	0	0	2	0	1
19	MF	(Canada)	Maël Henry	0	0	0	0	0	0	0	0	0
19	MF	(Haiti)	Mikaël Cantave	3	0	0	0	0	0	3	0	0
20	DF	(Canada)	Anthony White	1	0	0	0	0	0	1	0	0
22	MF	(Canada)	Marcus Simmons	1	0	0	0	0	0	1	0	0
23	DF	(Canada)	Kahlil John-Wentworth	0	0	0	0	0	0	0	0	0
24	MF	(Canada)	Lennon Thompson	1	0	0	0	0	0	1	0	0
25	DF	(Canada)	James Cameron	3	0	0	0	0	0	3	0	0
26	MF	(Canada)	Taryck Tahid	1	0	0	0	0	0	1	0	0
31	GK	(United States)	Jeremy Zielinski	0	0	0	0	0	0	0	0	0
33	MF	(Colombia)	Ivan Mejia	0	0	0	0	0	0	0	0	0
	FW	(Canada)	Kourosh Jamshidi	0	0	0	0	0	0	0	0	0
Totals				59	0	3	2	0	0	61	0	3

== Honours ==
=== Canadian Premier League Awards ===
The Canadian Premier League Awards took place on October 26 in Hamilton.

Name	Award	Status	Source
James Cameron	Best Canadian U-21 Player	Nominated	

==== Monthly Awards ====
Month	Name	Award	Source
May	Callum Irving	Goalkeeper of the Month	

==== Team of the Week ====
The Gatorade Team of the Week was selected by the CPL's Kristian Jack and OneSoccer's Oliver Platt.

Week	Name	Source
1	Callum Irving	
2	Callum Irving (2); Rocco Romeo; Gabriel Bitar; Shaan Hundal	
3	Kadin Chung	
4	Ibrahim Bakare	
6	Tyler Crawford; Min-jae Kwak	
7	Eugene Martínez	
8	T.J. Tahid	
11	Callum Irving (3); Anthony White	
13	Rocco Romeo (2)	
17	James Cameron	
19	Gabriel Bitar (2)	
20	Gabriel Bitar (3)	
22	James Cameron (2); Gabriel Bitar (4); Mikaël Cantave	
