= 2023 Canadian Premier League season =

Professional soccer league season

Canadian Premier League
- Season: 2023
- Dates: April 15 – October 7 (regular season)
- Champions: Forge FC (4th title)
- CPL Shield: Cavalry FC (2nd shield)
- CONCACAF Champions Cup: Forge FC; Cavalry FC
- Matches: 112
- Goals: 292 (2.61 per match)
- Top goalscorer: Ollie Bassett; Myer Bevan (11 goals each)
- Biggest home win: Pacific 4–1 York United (May 14); Cavalry 3–0 Forge (August 4); HFX Wanderers 3–0 Vancouver (August 12); HFX Wanderers 3–0 Valour (August 26); Cavalry 3–0 Pacific (October 7)
- Biggest away win: Vancouver 0–5 Atlético Ottawa (May 13)
- Highest scoring: Vancouver 3–6 Pacific (June 2)
- Longest winning run: 5 matches Cavalry (September 12 – October 7)
- Longest unbeaten run: 9 matches Pacific (May 6 – June 30); Cavalry (August 20 – October 7)
- Longest winless run: 8 matches HFX Wanderers (April 15 – June 3)
- Longest losing run: 3 matches (8 teams tied)
- Highest attendance: 7,042; Atlético Ottawa 1–1 HFX Wanderers (April 15)
- Lowest attendance: 822; York United 1–2 Vancouver (April 22)
- Total attendance: 421,247
- Average attendance: 3,865

The 2023 Canadian Premier League season was the fifth season of the Canadian Premier League, the top men's professional level of the Canadian Soccer Association's league system. The CPL Shield was won by Cavalry FC who finished first in the regular season by a 13 point margin. In the CPL final, Forge FC defeated Cavalry FC 2–1 in Hamilton to capture the North Star Cup. In doing so, Forge became league champions for the fourth time in five seasons. Both title winning clubs qualified for the newly expanded 2024 CONCACAF Champions Cup.

== Team and rule changes ==
Eight teams competed in the 2023 season with the debut of Vancouver FC, and the dissolution of FC Edmonton. The league's playoff structure changed to a five-team Page playoff system with four elimination matches and one non-elimination match.

The league's player compensation budget increased by $175,000 compared to 2022. Teams were required to spend between $750,000 and $1,025,000 on their 20–23 player rosters with a minimum of $30,000 per player. A team making full use of the U-21 salary rule could reach a compensation maximum of $1,125,000. In July 2023, the CPL introduced the Exceptional Youth Talent (EYT) designation which teams can apply to two U-18 players who are on standard contracts. EYT players do not count towards the 23 player roster limit and a portion of their salaries do not count towards the cap.

== Teams ==
=== Stadiums and locations ===
Location of the 2023 Canadian Premier League teams

Club	Location	Stadium	Capacity
Atlético Ottawa	Ottawa	TD Place Stadium	24,000
Cavalry FC	Foothills County	ATCO Field	6,000
Forge FC	Hamilton	Tim Hortons Field	23,218
HFX Wanderers FC	Halifax	Wanderers Grounds	6,500
Pacific FC	Langford	Starlight Stadium	6,000
Valour FC	Winnipeg	IG Field	33,000
Vancouver FC	Langley	Willoughby Community Park Stadium	6,560
York United FC	Toronto	York Lions Stadium	4,000

=== Personnel and sponsorship ===
Team	Head coach	Captain	Kit manufacturer	Shirt sponsor (chest)	Shirt sponsor (sleeve)
Atlético Ottawa	(Spain) Carlos González	(Canada) Carl Haworth	Macron	Maple Lodge Farms	CIBC
Cavalry	(England) Tommy Wheeldon Jr.	(Canada) Marco Carducci	Macron	WestJet	CIBC
Forge	(Canada) Bobby Smyrniotis	(Canada) Kyle Bekker	Macron	Tim Hortons	CIBC
HFX Wanderers	(Canada) Patrice Gheisar	(Trinidad and Tobago) Andre Rampersad	Macron	Volkswagen	CIBC
Pacific	(Canada) James Merriman	(Wales) Josh Heard	Macron	Telus	CIBC
Valour	(Canada) Phillip Dos Santos	(Haiti) Andrew Jean-Baptiste	Macron	OneSoccer	CIBC
Vancouver	(Iran) Afshin Ghotbi	(Canada) Callum Irving	Macron	CIBC	Carlsberg 0.0%
York United	(Canada) Martin Nash	(Canada) Roger Thompson	Macron	Carlsberg 0.0%	CIBC

=== Number of teams by province or territory ===
Rank	Province or territory	Number	Teams
1	Ontario	3	Atlético Ottawa; Forge; York United
2	British Columbia	2	Pacific; Vancouver FC
3	Alberta	1	Cavalry
3	Manitoba	1	Valour
3	Nova Scotia	1	HFX Wanderers

=== Coaching changes ===
Team	Outgoing coach	Manner of departure	Date of vacancy	Position in table	Incoming coach	Date of appointment
HFX Wanderers	(Tobago) Stephen Hart	End of contract	October 13, 2022	Pre-season	(Canada) Patrice Gheisar	November 30, 2022
Vancouver FC	N/A (inaugural season)			Pre-season	(Iran) Afshin Ghotbi	November 2, 2022
FC Edmonton	(South Africa) Alan Koch	Team folded	November 21, 2022	N/A		

== Regular season ==
=== Format ===
The regular season was played as a quadruple round-robin, with each team playing the other seven teams twice at home and twice away between April 15 and October 7. The regular season winner (the team ranked first after all 28 games) qualified for the 2024 CONCACAF Champions Cup and the top five teams qualified for the playoffs.

=== Standings ===
Pos	Team	Pld	W	D	L	GF	GA	GD	Pts	Playoff qualification
1	Cavalry (S)	28	16	7	5	46	27	+19	55	First semifinal
2	Forge (C)	28	11	9	8	39	32	+7	42 (Note: Tie resolved by away goal differential; Forge: +4, Wanderers: −2)	First semifinal
3	HFX Wanderers	28	11	9	8	39	32	+7	42	Quarterfinal
4	Pacific	28	11	7	10	42	35	+7	40	Play-in round
5	York United	28	11	5	12	35	44	−9	38	Play-in round
6	Atlético Ottawa	28	10	6	12	38	34	+4	36	
7	Vancouver	28	8	5	15	28	50	−22	29	
8	Valour	28	6	8	14	25	38	−13	26	

Source: CanPL
Rules for classification: 1) Points; 2) Total wins; 3) Goal difference; 4) Goals scored; 5) Away goal differential; 6) Away goals scored; 7) Home goal differential; 8) Home goals scored; 9) Total minutes played by U-21 players; 10) Coin toss (2 teams tied) or drawing of lots (3+ teams tied).
(C) Champion (qualified to Champions Cup); (S) CPL Shield winner (qualified to Champions Cup)

=== Results ===
Home \ Away	ATO	CAV	FOR	HFX	PAC	VAL	VFC	YRK
Atlético Ottawa		1–0	0–1	1–1	1–4	2–0	1–0	0–1
Atlético Ottawa		1–2	0–0	2–0	1–1	0–1	3–1	3–3
Cavalry	2–0		1–1	2–2	1–0	1–1	3–1	2–1
Cavalry	0–2		3–0	1–0	3–0	2–1	2–1	2–1
Forge	4–3	2–2		1–1	0–1	3–2	0–0	1–2
Forge	0–1	0–0		1–1	3–1	1–1	2–0	3–3
HFX Wanderers	1–0	3–1	2–1		2–1	2–0	1–1	0–3
HFX Wanderers	3–2	1–2	2–1		1–2	3–0	3–0	1–2
Pacific	2–2	1–1	0–1	1–1		1–0	1–0	4–1
Pacific	0–1	1–2	0–2	1–1		2–1	1–2	1–0
Valour	1–1	0–2	2–0	0–0	1–1		1–0	1–1
Valour	1–3	3–2	2–3	0–1	0–3		0–1	1–2
Vancouver	0–5	1–1	2–0	2–1	3–6	0–0		1–2
Vancouver	2–1	1–5	0–3	2–1	3–2	0–0		1–2
York United	2–1	1–0	0–1	2–2	0–0	0–2	1–2	
York United	1–0	0–1	0–4	0–2	1–4	1–3	2–1	

Source: CanPL.ca
Legend: Blue = home team win; Yellow = draw; Red = away team win.

=== U-21 minute standings ===
In order to qualify for the playoffs, clubs were also required to accumulate at least 2,000 minutes played by U-21 domestic players during the regular season. Additionally, only 1,000 of these minutes could be played by players on loan from other clubs. Clubs that do not meet the 2,000 minute threshold may also incur financial penalties from the league.

Pos	Team	Pld	Min	Playoff eligibility
1	Vancouver	28	5,203	Eligible
2	Valour	28	4,390	Eligible
3	Pacific (Q)	28	2,674	Eligible
4	Forge (Q)	28	2,052	Eligible
5	Cavalry (Q)	28	2,044	Eligible
6	Atlético Ottawa	28	2,034	Eligible
7	HFX Wanderers (Q)	28	2,032	Eligible
8	York United (Q)	28	2,006	Eligible

Source: CanPL
(Q) Qualified for the playoffs

== Playoffs ==
The 2023 season used the Page playoff system. The team who finished first in the regular-season table would play the team who finished second, and the winner would host the final. The fourth- and fifth-placed teams would play in a play-in round, and the winner of this game would then play the third-placed team in a quarter-final. The quarter-final winner would play the loser of the game between the first and second-placed teams for the other spot in the final.

=== Bracket ===
Play-in round
October 11
4	Pacific FC	1
5	York United FC	0

First semifinal
October 14
1	Cavalry FC	1
2	Forge FC	2
Quarterfinal
October 14
3	HFX Wanderers FC	0
4	Pacific FC	1

Second semifinal
October 21
1	Cavalry FC	2
4	Pacific FC	1

Final
October 28
2	Forge FC	2
1	Cavalry FC	1

=== Matches ===
==== Play-in round ====
October 11	Pacific FC	1–0	York United FC	Langford, British Columbia
7:00 pm PDT (10:00 pm EDT)	Reid 90+1'	Report		Stadium: Starlight Stadium; Attendance: 2,780

==== Quarterfinal ====
October 14	HFX Wanderers FC	0–1	Pacific FC	Halifax, Nova Scotia
3:00 pm ADT (2:00 pm EDT)		Report	Fernandez 37' (o.g.)	Stadium: Wanderers Grounds; Attendance: 6,254

==== First semifinal ====
October 14 Cavalry–Forge rivalry	Cavalry FC	1–2	Forge FC	Foothills County, Alberta
3:00 PM MDT (5:00 PM EDT)	Mason 80'	Report	Hojabrpour 29'; Bekker 50'	Stadium: ATCO Field; Attendance: 4,385

==== Second semifinal ====
October 21	Cavalry FC	2–1	Pacific FC	Foothills County, Alberta
2:00 PM MDT (4:00 PM EDT)	Klomp 27'; Musse 61'	Report	Manneh 66'	Stadium: ATCO Field; Attendance: 4,066

==== Final ====
October 28, 2023
6:00 pm ET

Forge FC	2–1 (a.e.t.)	Cavalry FC
Badibanga 105+2'; Borges 111'	Recap; Report	Musse 101'

Tim Hortons Field, Hamilton, Ontario
Attendance: 13,925
Referee: Marie-Soleil Beaudoin

== Attendance ==
As of end of regular season

Pos	Team	Total	High	Low	Average	Change
1	HFX Wanderers	81,951	6,413	4,907	5,854	+0.5%
2	Forge FC	74,458	6,917	3,827	5,318	+55.0%
3	Atlético Ottawa	69,423	7,044	3,074	4,959	+21.9%
4	Cavalry FC	57,265	4,990	3,189	4,090	+17.1%
5	Pacific FC	45,376	4,825	2,455	3,241	+2.0%
6	Valour FC	45,084	4,036	2,665	3,220	+3.5%
7	Vancouver FC	39,030	6,177	2,099	2,788	n/a
8	York United	17,382	1,783	822	1,242	+0.6%
	League total	429,969	7,044	822	3,839	+20.9%

== Statistical leaders ==
=== Top scorers ===
Rank	Player	Club	Goals
1	(Northern Ireland) Ollie Bassett	Atlético Ottawa	11
1	(New Zealand) Myer Bevan	Cavalry	11
3	(Canada) Terran Campbell	Forge	10
3	(Haiti) Woobens Pacius	Forge	10
5	(Canada) Massimo Ferrin	HFX Wanderers	8
6	(Canada) Samuel Salter	Atlético Ottawa	7
6	(Netherlands) Ayman Sellouf	Pacific	7
8	(Syria) Molham Babouli	York United	6
8	(Lebanon) Gabriel Bitar	Vancouver	6
8	(Canada) Sergio Camargo	Cavalry	6
8	(Haiti) Mikaël Cantave	Cavalry / Vancouver	6
8	(Guyana) Osaze De Rosario	York United	6
8	(Canada) Shaan Hundal	Vancouver	6
8	(Canada) Daniel Nimick	HFX Wanderers	6
8	(Portugal) Kévin dos Santos	York United	6

=== Top assists ===
Rank	Player	Club	Assists
1	(Netherlands) Ayman Sellouf	Pacific	8
2	(Canada) Kyle Bekker	Forge	7
3	(France) Lorenzo Callegari	HFX Wanderers	6
3	(Somalia) Ali Musse	Cavalry	6
5	(Canada) Manny Aparicio	Pacific	5
5	(Canada) Aidan Daniels	HFX Wanderers	5
5	(Canada) Jérémy Gagnon-Laparé	York United	5
5	(England) Kian Williams	Valour	5
9	(New Zealand) Myer Bevan	Cavalry	4
9	(Lebanon) Gabriel Bitar	Vancouver	4
9	(Canada) Tristan Borges	Forge	4
9	(Australia) Jesse Daley	Cavalry	4
9	(Canada) Carl Haworth	Atlético Ottawa	4
9	(Canada) Wesley Timoteo	HFX Wanderers	4

=== Clean sheets ===
Rank	Player	Club	Clean sheets
1	(Canada) Triston Henry	Forge	9
2	(Canada) Marco Carducci	Cavalry	8
3	(Canada) Yann Fillion	HFX Wanderers	7
3	(Canada) Nathan Ingham	Atlético Ottawa	7
3	(Algeria) Rayane Yesli	Valour	7

=== Hat-tricks ===
Player	For	Against	Result	Date	Ref.
(Canada) Terran Campbell	Forge	York United	4–0 (A)	July 9	
(Haiti) Woobens Pacius	Forge	Vancouver	3–0 (A)	September 3	

== Awards ==
=== Canadian Premier League Awards ===
The 2023 Canadian Premier League Awards were held in Hamilton, Ontario, on October 26, 2023.

Award	Recipient	Finalist
Golden Boot	(New Zealand) Myer Bevan (Cavalry FC) (Northern Ireland) Ollie Bassett (Atlético Ottawa)	N/A
Golden Glove	(Canada) Triston Henry (Forge FC)	(Canada) Marco Carducci (Cavalry FC) (Algeria) Rayane Yesli (Valour FC)
Coach of the Year	(England) Tommy Wheeldon Jr. (Cavalry FC)	(Canada) Patrice Gheisar (Halifax Wanderers) (Canada) Bobby Smyrniotis (Forge FC)
Player of the Year	(Netherlands) Daan Klomp (Cavalry FC)	(Canada) Manny Aparicio (Pacific FC) (Canada) Kyle Bekker (Forge FC) (France) Lorenzo Callegari (Halifax Wanderers) (Somalia) Ali Musse (Cavalry FC)
Best Under 21 Canadian Player of the Year	(Canada) Matteo De Brienne (Valour FC)	(Canada) James Cameron (Vancouver FC) (Canada) Kwasi Poku (Forge FC)
Defender of the Year	(Netherlands) Daan Klomp (Cavalry FC)	(Canada) Manjrekar James (Forge FC) (Canada) Daniel Nimick (Halifax Wanderers)
Players' Player of the Year	(Somalia) Ali Musse (Cavalry FC)	(Canada) Kyle Bekker (Forge FC) (Netherlands) Daan Klomp (Cavalry FC)

=== Canadian Premier League Best XI ===
Goalkeeper	Defenders	Midfielders	Forwards	Ref
(Canada) Triston Henry (Forge)	(Netherlands) Daan Klomp (Cavalry); (Canada) Manjrekar James (Forge); (Canada) Daniel Nimick (HFX)	(France) Lorenzo Callegari (HFX); (Canada) Manny Aparicio (Pacific); (Canada) Kyle Bekker (Forge); (Northern Ireland) Ollie Bassett (Ottawa)	(Belgium) Béni Badibanga (Forge); (Canada) Terran Campbell (Forge); (Somalia) Ali Musse (Cavalry)	

=== Team of the Week ===
The Gatorade Team of the Week was selected by the CPL's Kristian Jack and OneSoccer's Oliver Platt.

Team of the Week
Dates	Goalkeeper	Defenders	Midfielders	Forwards	Ref
April 15–16	(Canada) Irving (Vancouver)	(Canada) Ferrazzo (HFX); (Canada) Nimick (HFX); (Mali) Samaké (Valour); (Netherlands) Vliet (Pacific)	(France) Callegari (HFX); (Ghana) Ohin (Valour); (Canada) Jensen (Forge); (Canada) Aparicio (Pacific)	(New Zealand) Bevan (Cavalry); (Burundi) Niyongabire (Valour)	
April 22–23	(Canada) Irving (Vancouver)	(England) Bakare (Vancouver); (Spain) Espejo (Ottawa); (Canada) Romeo (Vancouver); (Canada) de Brienne (Valour)	(Canada) Gutiérrez (Valour); (Canada) Young (Pacific); (Netherlands) Sellouf (Pacific); (Lebanon) Bitar (Vancouver); (Canada) Ferrin (HFX)	(Canada) Hundal (Vancouver)	
April 29–30	(Canada) Giantsopoulos (York)	(Canada) Gee (York); (Canada) James (Forge); (Canada) Morgan (Forge)	(Cuba) Baquero (Valour); (Canada) Chung (Vancouver); (Mali) Sissoko (Forge); (Mexico) Sandoval (Vancouver)	(Somalia) Musse (Cavalry); (Syria) Babouli (York); (France) Collomb (HFX)	
May 5–7	(Canada) Henry (Forge)	(Canada) Mukumbilwa (Pacific); (Canada) Đidić (Pacific); (England) Bakare (Vancouver)	(Netherlands) Sellouf (Pacific); (Canada) Aparicio (Pacific); (Canada) Campbell (Valour); (Canada) Borges (Forge)	(Netherlands) Daniels (Pacific); (Canada) Campbell (Forge); (Wales) Heard (Pacific)	
May 13–14	(Canada) Melvin (Ottawa)	(Canada) de Brienne (Valour); (Canada) Đidić (Pacific); (Canada) Meilleur-Giguère (Pacific); (Canada) Assi (Ottawa)	(Canada) Verhoven (Ottawa); (Canada) Young (Pacific); (Northern Ireland) Bassett (Ottawa); (Somalia) Musse (Cavalry)	(Canada) Hamilton (Forge); (Canada) Reid (Pacific)	
May 19–21	(Canada) Baskett (Pacific)	(Canada) Crawford (Vancouver); (Liberia) Soumaoro (York); (Netherlands) Klomp (Cavalry); (South Korea) Kwak (Vancouver)	(Australia) Daley (Cavalry); (Canada) Young (Pacific); (Somalia) Musse (Cavalry); (Canada) Camargo (Cavalry); (Burundi) Niyongabire (Valour)	(Canada) Ricci (York)	
May 27–28	(Canada) Henry (Forge)	(Netherlands) Faye (York); (Canada) Gee (York); (Belize) Martínez (Vancouver); (Canada) Fernandez (HFX)	(France) Callegari (HFX); (Canada) Young (Pacific); (Somalia) Musse (Cavalry); (Canada) Daniels (HFX); (Canada) Bayiha (York)	(Canada) Reid (Pacific)	
May 31 – June 4	(Canada) Melvin (Ottawa)	(Canada) de Brienne (Valour); (Liberia) Soumaoro (York); (Spain) Espejo (Ottawa); (Cuba) Baquero (Valour)	(Canada) Bekker (Forge); (Canada) Toussaint (Pacific); (Northern Ireland) Bassett (Ottawa)	(Netherlands) Sellouf (Pacific); (Canada) Tahid (Vancouver); (Canada) Reid (Pacific)	
June 9–11	(Canada) Baskett (Pacific)	(Canada) Loughrey (HFX); (Australia) Mourdoukoutas (York); (Canada) Meilleur-Giguère (Pacific); (Guyana) Grant (York)	(Canada) Gagnon-Laparé (York); (England) Watson (HFX); (Benin) Ntignee (Cavalry); (Canada) Daniels (HFX); (Canada) Reid (Pacific)	(New Zealand) Bevan (Cavalry)	
June 16–18	(Algeria) Yesli (Valour)	(Canada) Campbell (Valour); (Canada) Đidić (Pacific); (France) Pianelli (Valour); (Canada) Haworth (Ottawa)	(Canada) Daniels (HFX); (Canada) Young (Pacific); (Northern Ireland) Bassett (Ottawa)	(Chile) Ponce (Valour); (Canada) Salter (Ottawa); (Canada) Coimbra (HFX)	
June 20–25	(Canada) Irving (Vancouver)	(Canada) White (Vancouver); (Mali) Samaké (Valour); (Canada) Đidić (Pacific)	(Netherlands) Sellouf (Pacific); (United States) Sánchez (Valour); (Canada) Gutiérrez (Valour); (Benin) Ntignee (Cavalry)	(Syria) Babouli (York); (Canada) Campbell (Forge); (Canada) Daniels (HFX)	
June 30 – July 2	(Canada) Carducci (Cavalry)	(Canada) Gee (York); (Netherlands) Klomp (Cavalry); (Canada) Nimick (HFX); (Spain) Acosta (Ottawa)	(Canada) Gagnon-Laparé (York); (Canada) Bekker (Forge); (Northern Ireland) Bassett (Ottawa)	(Netherlands) Sellouf (Pacific); (Canada) Ferrin (HFX); (Canada) Bayiha (York)	
July 7–9	(Canada) Henry (Forge)	(Canada) Aird (Cavalry); (Canada) Romeo (Vancouver); (Netherlands) Klomp (Cavalry); (France) Sacko (Ottawa)	(Northern Ireland) Bassett (Ottawa); (Canada) Bekker (Forge); (Canada) Kobza (Cavalry)	(Canada) Borges (Forge); (Haiti) Cantave (Cavalry); (Canada) Campbell (Forge)	
July 12–16	(Canada) Giantsopoulos (York)	(Canada) Aird (Cavalry); (Spain) Espejo (Ottawa); (Canada) Meilleur-Giguère (Pacific); (Spain) Acosta (Ottawa)	(France) Callegari (HFX); (Canada) Bekker (Forge); (Spain) Zapater (Ottawa)	(Canada) Haworth (Ottawa); (Canada) Campbell (Forge); (Canada) Ferrin (HFX)	
July 21–23	(Canada) Henry (Forge)	(Netherlands) Klomp (Cavalry); (Canada) James (Forge); (Canada) Nimick (HFX)	(Canada) Choinière (Forge); (Canada) Bekker (Forge); (France) Callegari (HFX); (Canada) Ferrari (York)	(Somalia) Musse (Cavalry); (France) Collomb (HFX); (Canada) Ricci (York)	
July 28–30	(Canada) Henry (Forge)	(Cameroon) Niba (Ottawa); (Canada) Ouimette (Ottawa); (Canada) Fernandez (HFX)	(Canada) Morgan (Forge); (Canada) Bekker (Forge); (France) Callegari (HFX); (Canada) Dada-Luke (Pacific)	(Canada) Salter (Ottawa); (Canada) Aparicio (Pacific); (Brazil) Morelli (HFX)	
August 4–7	(Algeria) Yesli (Valour)	(Canada) Cameron (Vancouver); (Netherlands) Klomp (Cavalry); (Canada) Đidić (Pacific); (Canada) Haworth (Ottawa)	(Benin) Ntignee (Cavalry); (Canada) Young (Pacific); (Canada) Camargo (Cavalry); (Canada) Aparicio (Pacific); (Canada) Bayiha (York)	(Wales) Heard (Pacific)	
August 11–13	(Canada) Ingham (Ottawa)	(Canada) Timoteo (HFX); (Canada) Walker (Ottawa); (Canada) Nimick (HFX)	(England) Williams (Valour); (Canada) Bekker (Forge); (Canada) Gutiérrez (Valour); (Portugal) Santos (York)	(Canada) Ferrin (HFX); (Brazil) Morelli (HFX); (South Sudan) Akio (Cavalry)	
August 18–20	(Canada) Ingham (Ottawa)	(Canada) Loughrey (HFX); (Netherlands) Klomp (Cavalry); (Canada) Nimick (HFX)	(France) Kamdem (Cavalry); (Greece) Iliadis (Ottawa); (Australia) Daley (Cavalry); (Canada) Assi (Ottawa)	(Belgium) Badibanga (Forge); (Northern Ireland) Bassett (Ottawa); (Lebanon) Bitar (Vancouver)	
August 25–27	(Canada) Fillion (HFX)	(Spain) Acosta (Ottawa); (Netherlands) Klomp (Cavalry); (Canada) Nimick (HFX); (Canada) Kobza (Cavalry)	(Canada) Gagnon-Laparé (York); (Sweden) Achinioti-Jönsson (Forge); (Canada) Omar (HFX)	(Lebanon) Bitar (Vancouver); (Brazil) Morelli (HFX); (Canada) Ricci (York)	
September 2–4	(United States) De Rosario (York)	(Australia) Mourdoukoutas (York); (Canada) Thompson (York); (Netherlands) Klomp (Cavalry)	(Netherlands) Sellouf (Pacific); (Canada) Trafford (Cavalry); (Sweden) Achinioti-Jönsson (Forge); (South Sudan) Akio (Cavalry)	(Canada) Camargo (Cavalry); (Haiti) Pacius (Forge); (Canada) Aparicio (Pacific)	
September 8–9	(Algeria) Yesli (Valour)	(Canada) Ferrazzo (HFX); (Canada) Henry (HFX); (Netherlands) Klomp (Cavalry); (Canada) Campbell (Valour)	(Canada) Cameron (Vancouver); (Canada) Wilson (HFX); (Canada) Gutiérrez (Valour); (Canada) Shome (Cavalry)	(Lebanon) Bitar (Vancouver); (Haiti) Cantave (Vancouver)	

=== Monthly awards ===
Month	Manager of the Month		Player of the Month		Goalkeeper of the Month		References
Month	Manager	Club	Player	Club	Goalkeeper	Club	References
April	(Canada) Bobby Smyrniotis	Forge FC	(Canada) Diego Gutiérrez	Valour FC	(Canada) Callum Irving	Vancouver FC	
May	(Canada) James Merriman	Pacific FC	(Canada) Sean Young	Pacific FC	(Canada) Triston Henry	Forge FC	
June	(Canada) Patrice Gheisar	HFX Wanderers FC	(Netherlands) Ayman Sellouf	Pacific FC	(Algeria) Rayane Yesli	Pacific FC	
July	(Spain) Carlos González	Atlético Ottawa	(Canada) Kyle Bekker	Forge FC	(Canada) Triston Henry	Forge FC	
August	(England) Tommy Wheeldon Jr.	Cavalry FC	(Canada) Daniel Nimick	HFX Wanderers FC	(Canada) Nathan Ingham	Atlético Ottawa	
September	(England) Tommy Wheeldon Jr.	Cavalry FC	(Netherlands) Daan Klomp	Cavalry FC	(Canada) Marco Carducci	Cavalry FC	
October	(Canada) Bobby Smyrniotis	Forge FC	(Somalia) Ali Musse	Cavalry FC	(Canada) Triston Henry	Forge FC	

== Player transfers ==
=== U Sports Draft ===
The 2023 CPL–U Sports Draft took place on December 15, 2022. Each team made two picks in the draft for a total of 16 selections with expansion club Vancouver FC selecting first.

=== Foreign players ===
Canadian Premier League teams can sign a maximum of seven international players, out of which only five can be in the starting line-up for each match. At least 50% of a team's international players must be U-23 at all times. If a club wishes to utilize the maximum 7 slots, the 7th player must be U-21.

The following international players were signed for the 2023 season. Note that players may be considered domestic for CPL purposes (Canadian citizens, permanent residents, or refugees) while still representing other countries in international competitions.

Club	Player 1	Player 2	Player 3	Player 4	Player 5	Player 6	Player 7	Former players
Atlético Ottawa	(Spain) Miguel Acosta	(Northern Ireland) Ollie Bassett	(Spain) Diego Espejo	(Cape Verde) **Gianni dos Santos**	(France) Aboubakary Sacko	(Spain) Alberto Zapater	(Switzerland) Rubén del Campo	
Cavalry	(Netherlands) Daan Klomp	(Republic of Ireland) Joe Mason	(Spain) Roberto Alarcón	(Australia) Jesse Daley	(Nigeria) Udoka Chima	(Republic of Ireland) Tom Field		(Honduras) José Escalante
Forge	(Sweden) Alexander Achinioti-Jönsson	(England) Malik Owolabi-Belewu	(Albania) Rezart Rama	(Belgium) Béni Badibanga				
HFX Wanderers	(Trinidad and Tobago) **Andre Rampersad**	(Brazil) João Morelli	(England) Lifumpa Mwandwe	(France) Lorenzo Callegari	(England) Callum Watson	(France) Théo Collomb		(Nigeria) Kosi Nwafornso
Pacific	(Netherlands) Djenairo Daniels	(Netherlands) Bradley Vliet	(Netherlands) Ayman Sellouf	(Portugal) David Brazão	(The Gambia) Kekuta Manneh			
Valour	(Haiti) **Andrew Jean-Baptiste**	(Chile) Walter Ponce	(Colombia) Kevin Rendón	(Burundi) **Pacifique Niyongabire**	(England) Kian Williams	(Jordan) **Jaime Siaj**		
Vancouver	(Ghana) Nicky Gyimah	(South Korea) Min-jae Kwak	(England) Ibrahim Bakare	(Mexico) Alejandro Díaz	(Brazil) Renan Garcia			(France) Emmanuel Robe (Mexico) Gael Sandoval (Belize) **Eugene Martínez**
York United	(Australia) Tass Mourdoukoutas	(Portugal) Kévin dos Santos	(Liberia) **Brem Soumaoro**					(Netherlands) Lassana Faye (Netherlands) Oussama Alou

Players in italic denote players who were new to their respective clubs for the 2023 season, sorted chronologically by their announcement. Players in Bold indicate players who have represented their national teams at the senior level.

== 2024 CONCACAF Champions Cup ==
Forge FC and Cavalry FC both earned berths in the newly expanded 2024 CONCACAF Champions Cup as CPL champions and regular season champions respectively. The newly expanded tournament has teams from across North America, Central America, and the Caribbean compete for a spot in the FIFA Club World Cup. Qualification for the CONCACAF Champions Cup was also available to CPL clubs if they won the Canadian Championship; however, the 2023 Canadian Championship was not won by a CPL team.

Method	Qualified team
CPL champion	Forge FC
CPL regular season winner	Cavalry FC
