= List of Canadian Premier League transfers 2024 =

This is a list of transfers for the 2024 Canadian Premier League season.

This list includes all transfers involving Canadian Premier League clubs after their last match of the 2023 Canadian Premier League season and before their last match of the 2024 season.

== Transfers ==
Clubs without flags are Canadian.

Date	Name	Moving from	Moving to	Fee
3 November 2023	(Brazil) João Morelli	HFX Wanderers FC	Retired	Retired
9 November 2023	(Canada) Nathaniel St. Louis	Vancouver FC		Contract expired
9 November 2023	(Ghana) Nicky Gyimah	Vancouver FC		Contract expired
9 November 2023	(United States) Jeremy Zielinski	Vancouver FC		Contract expired
19 November 2023	(England) Lifumpa Mwandwe	HFX Wanderers FC		Contract expired
21 November 2023	(Spain) Diego Espejo	Atlético Ottawa	(Spain) Atlético Madrid B	Loan expired
21 November 2023	(Canada) Jean-Aniel Assi	Atlético Ottawa	CF Montréal	Loan expired
21 November 2023	(Greece) Ilias Iliadis	Atlético Ottawa	CF Montréal	Loan expired
21 November 2023	(Trinidad and Tobago) Luke Singh	Atlético Ottawa	Toronto FC	Loan expired
22 November 2023	(Tunisia) Eskander Mzoughi	Valour FC		Contract expired
22 November 2023	(Canada) Matthew Chandler	Valour FC		Contract expired
22 November 2023	(Canada) Anthony Novak	Valour FC		Contract expired
22 November 2023	(Jordan) Jaime Siaj	Valour FC		Contract expired
22 November 2023	(United States) Ahinga Selemani	Valour FC		Contract expired
22 November 2023	(Colombia) Kevin Rendon	Valour FC		Contract expired
29 November 2023	(Canada) Kieran Baskett	Pacific FC		Contract expired
29 November 2023	(Canada) Abdul Binate	Pacific FC		Contract expired
29 November 2023	(Canada) Jalen Watson	Pacific FC		Contract expired
30 November 2023	(Canada) Gareth Smith-Doyle	Cavalry FC		Contract expired
30 November 2023	(Canada) Sterling Kerr	Cavalry FC		Contract expired
30 November 2023	(Republic of Ireland) Joe Mason	Cavalry FC		Contract expired
30 November 2023	(Canada) Shaan Hundal	Vancouver FC	Valour FC	Free
1 December 2023	(Canada) Zachary Sukunda	(Finland) IF Gnistan	Valour FC	Free
9 December 2023	(Nigeria) Udoka Chima	Cavalry FC	(England) Worthing FC	Free
11 December 2023	(Canada) Mohamed Omar	HFX Wanderers FC	(United States) San Antonio FC	Free
15 December 2023	(Spain) Roberto Alarcon	Cavalry FC	Valour FC	Free
17 December 2023	(Canada) Woobens Pacius	Forge FC		Contract expired
18 December 2023	(Canada) Jordan Faria	Toronto FC II	Valour FC	Free
19 December 2023	(Canada) Doneil Henry	HFX Wanderers FC		Contract expired
19 December 2023	(France) Theo Collomb	HFX Wanderers FC		Contract expired
19 December 2023	(Canada) Cristian Campagna	HFX Wanderers FC		Contract expired
19 December 2023	(Canada) Ryan James	HFX Wanderers FC		Contract expired
19 December 2023	(Canada) Jake Ruby	HFX Wanderers FC		Contract expired
19 December 2023	(Canada) Armaan Wilson	HFX Wanderers FC		Contract expired
20 December 2023	(Canada) Roger Thompson	York United	Retired	Retired
21 December 2023	(Canada) Matteo De Brienne	Valour FC	Atlético Ottawa	Free
22 December 2023	(Canada) Jeremy Gagnon-Lapare	York United		Contract terminated
22 December 2023	(Canada) Michael Petrasso	York United		Contract expired
22 December 2023	(Canada) Paris Gee	York United		Contract expired
22 December 2023	(Guyana) Jonathan Grant	York United		Contract expired
22 December 2023	(Canada) Carson Buschman-Dormond	York United		Contract expired
27 December 2023	(Australia) Tass Mourdoukoutas	York United	Valour FC	Free
30 December 2023	(Canada) Manjrekar James	Forge FC	(Costa Rica) Alajuelense	Undisclosed
1 January 2024	(Cape Verde) Gianni dos Santos	Atlético Ottawa	(India) Inter Kashi	Undisclosed
2 January 2024	(Canada) Diego Gutierrez	Valour FC	Cavalry FC	Free
3 January 2024	(Liechtenstein) Dennis Salanovic	(Spain) CF Talavera de la Reina	York United	Free
4 January 2024	(Canada) Juan Córdova	(Chile) Ñublense	York United	Free
8 January 2024	(Canada) Manny Aparicio	Pacific FC	Atlético Ottawa	Contract Expired
9 January 2024	(Canada) Ben Fisk	Cavalry FC	Vancouver FC	Traded
12 January 2024	(Australia) Jordan Swibel	(Australia) Marconi Stallions	Valour FC	Free
12 January 2024	(Burundi) Pacifique Niyongabire	Valour FC	(United States) Tampa Bay Rowdies	Undisclosed
16 January 2024	(Germany) Tobias Warschewski	Unattached	Cavalry FC	Free
17 January 2024	(Canada) Grady McDonnell	Vancouver Whitecaps Academy	Vancouver FC	Free
17 January 2024	(Canada) Easton Ongaro	Pacific FC	(Italy) Novara Calcio	Undisclosed
18 January 2024	(Spain) Miguel Acosta	Atletico Ottawa		Contract Expired
19 January 2024	(Albania) Rezart Rama	Forge FC	(Albania) KF Egnatia	Free
19 January 2024	(Portugal) David Brazão	Pacific FC	(Lithuania) FC Džiugas Telšiai	Free
22 January 2024	(Canada) Ballou Tabla	(Turkey) Manisa FK	Atlético Ottawa	Free
23 January 2024	(Peru) Jared Ulloa	Valour FC	(Peru) Unión Huaral	Free
23 January 2024	(Canada) Paris Gee	York United	Vancouver FC	Free
23 January 2024	(Mexico) Oswaldo León	(Mexico) Dorados de Sinaloa	York United	Free
9 February 2024	(Canada) Jonathan Viscosi	(Finland) Vaasan Palloseura	Valour FC	Free
9 February 2024	(Canada) Noah Verhoeven	Atlético Ottawa	Valour FC	Loan
