= Nima Moazeni Zadeh =

Canadian soccer player

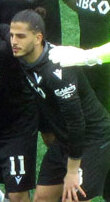

Personal information
- Date of birth: July 5, 1997 (age 29)
- Place of birth: Tehran, Iran
- Height: 5 ft 11 in (1.80 m)
- Position: Midfielder

Youth career
- 2006–2009: Rah Ahan
- 2009–2010: Foolad
- 2010–2012: Paykan
- 2012–2014: Saipa
- 2014–2018: Baadraan Tehran

College career
Years	Team	Apps	(Gls)
2021	Capilano Blues	8	(5)

Senior career*
Years	Team	Apps	(Gls)
2018	Baadraan Tehran	0	(0)
2019	CS Monteuil	8	(1)
2023	Vancouver FC	13	(0)
- * Club domestic league appearances and goals as of September 30, 2023 ‡ National team caps and goals as of February 25, 2023

Nima Moazeni Zadeh (Persian: نیما مؤذنی زاده, born 5 July 1997) is an Iranian footballer.

== Early life ==
Moazeni Zadeh played youth soccer with Rah Ahan Tehran FC, Foolad FC, Paykan FC, Saipa FC, and Baadraan Tehran FC. In Iran, he attended the University of Tehran, where he obtained a bachelor's degree in Physical Education. In 2019, due to the political unrest in Iran, he decided to leave Iran to move to Canada.

== University career ==
In 2021, Moazeni Zadeh began attending Capilano University in Canada, where he played for the men's soccer team. He made his debut on September 19, 2021, scoring two goals against the Douglas College Royals, which earned him PACWEST Athlete of the Week and CCAA Athlete of the Week honours. He was named PACWEST Player of the Year, a PACWEST Conference All-Star, and a CCAA All-Canadian. He won the PACWEST scoring title with five goals in eight matches in 2021.

== Club career ==
In 2018, he played with Baadraan Tehran in the Iranian second tier Azadegan League.

In 2019, he played with CS Monteuil in the Première ligue de soccer du Québec, scoring on 13 July against FC Gatineau. He later played at the senior amateur level with BB5 United and FC Tigers Vancouver.

In February 2023, he signed a professional contract with Vancouver FC of the Canadian Premier League ahead of their inaugural season, after attending their open trials. He made his league debut in their inaugural match on April 15, 2023, against Pacific FC.

== International career ==
Moazeni Zadeh has played with Iran at the U12, U14, and U18 levels.

== Career statistics ==
As of September 30, 2023

Club	Season	League			Domestic Cup		League Cup		Total	
Club	Season	Division	Apps	Goals	Apps	Goals	Apps	Goals	Apps	Goals
Baadraan Tehran FC	2017–18	Azadegan League	0	0	0	0	–		0	0
Baadraan Tehran FC	2018–19	Azadegan League	0	0	0	0	–		0	0
CS Monteuil	2019	Première ligue de soccer du Québec	8	1	–		2	0	10	1
Vancouver FC	2023	Canadian Premier League	13	0	1	0	–		14	0
Career total			21	1	1	0	2	0	24	1
