= Ameer Kinani =

Iraqi-Canadian soccer player (born 2001)

Personal information
- Full name: Ameer Ala'a Kadhim Kinani
- Date of birth: April 20, 2001 (age 25)
- Place of birth: Baghdad, Iraq
- Height: 1.83 m (6 ft 0 in)
- Position: Forward

Team information
- Current team: Oman Club

Youth career
- FC Emery
- York Jets SC
- Vaughan Azzurri

College career
Years	Team	Apps	(Gls)
2019	George Brown Huskies	8	(7)
2022	TMU Bold	13	(7)

Senior career*
Years	Team	Apps	(Gls)
2020–2021	Cartagena FC	10	(2)
2021	Atlético Benidorm	2	(0)
2022	ProStars FC	20	(17)
2023	Vancouver FC	18	(1)
2024	Duhok SC	1	(0)
2025	Al-Khaburah	12	(4)
2025	Sohar	7	(8)
2026	Al-Nahda (Oman)	13	(2)
2026–	Oman Club	0	(0)

International career
2018	Iraq U19	1+	(0)
- * Club domestic league appearances and goals as of 14 July 2026

Ameer Ala'a Kadhim Kinani (Arabic: أمير علاء كاظم الكناني; born April 20, 2001) is an Iraqi footballer who plays for Oman Club in the Oman Professional League.

== Early life ==
Born in Iraq, Kinani moved to Canada at age seven, where he began playing youth soccer with FC Emery (formerly known as Tecnico Ambato FC). He later played youth soccer with York Jets SC and Vaughan Azzurri.

== Collegiate career ==
In 2019, he began attending George Brown College, where he played for the men's soccer team. On October 14, 2019, he scored four goals in the final twenty minutes of a 6–1 victory over the Cenntenial Colts, a performance which earned him George Brown's Athlete of the Week honours.

In September 2022, he began attending Toronto Metropolitan University, where he played for the men's soccer team. On October 1, he scored a brace against the Royal Military College Paladins for his first goals. On October 16, he scored a hat trick against the Laurentian Voyageurs. On October 29, he scored the winning goal in the 90th minute on a penalty kick to give TMU a 2–1 victory over the Carleton Ravens in the OUA semi-finals. In his first season with TMU, he helped them win an OUA silver medal, and a fifth-place finish at the U SPORTS national championship.

== Club career ==
In 2020, he joined Spanish club Cartagena FC in the Tercera División.

In September 2021, he joined Atlético Benidorm in the Preferente Valenciana. However, soon afterwards, he returned to Canada, due to the expiry of his Spanish visa.

In 2022, he played with ProStars FC in League1 Ontario. He was named an honourable mention on the year-end all-stars team list.

In December 2022, he was selected second overall in the 2023 CPL-U Sports Draft by Vancouver FC. After attending pre-season with the club, he signed a U Sports developmental contract with the club, allowing him to maintain his university eligibility. He made his professional debut on April 15, in a substitute appearance against Pacific FC. He scored his first goal on June 20, in a 2–0 victory over Forge FC, also recording an assist in the match on the first goal of the match. Upon the expiry of his U Sports deal in August, he extended his contract for the remainder of the 2023 season.

In August 2024, he signed with Iraq Stars League club Duhok SC.

In January 2025, he moved to Oman Professional League club Al-Khaburah. He scored in his first match. Afterwards, he joined Sohar. In January 2026, he joined Al-Nahda. In July 2026, he signed with Oman Club.

== International career ==
In 2018, a highlight reel that he posted online attracted the attention of the Iraq Football Association and he was called up to the Iraq U19 a trial, where he participated in multiple friendlies. He was then called up for the 2018 AFC U-19 Championship.

In December 2022, he attended a camp with the Canada national futsal team, making his debut in the Canadian program.

In April 2025, he stated it was his goal to represent Iraq at senior level.

== Personal ==
Kinani is the son of former Iraq national team player Alaa Kadhim.

== Career statistics ==
As of October 6, 2023

Club	Season	League			Playoffs		Domestic Cup		Other		Total	
Club	Season	Division	Apps	Goals	Apps	Goals	Apps	Goals	Apps	Goals	Apps	Goals
Cartagena FC	2020–21	Tercera División	10	2	–		–		1 (Note: Appearance in the 2021 Tercera División promotion play-offs)	0	11	2
Atlético Benidorm	2021–22	Preferente Valenciana	2	0	–		–		–		2	0
ProStars FC	2022	League1 Ontario	20	17	1	0	–		–		21	17
Vancouver FC	2023	Canadian Premier League	18	1	–		1	0	–		19	1
Career total			50	20	1	0	1	0	1	0	53	20
