= Lennon Thompson =

Canadian soccer player (born 2005)

Personal information
- Date of birth: January 1, 2005 (age 21)
- Place of birth: Surrey, British Columbia, Canada
- Height: 1.91 m (6 ft 3 in)
- Position: Defender

Team information
- Current team: Balzan
- Number: 17

Youth career
- Coastal FC
- 2019–2021: Vancouver Whitecaps FC

Senior career*
Years	Team	Apps	(Gls)
2022	TSS FC Rovers		
2023	Vancouver FC	3	(0)
2023	→ Unity FC (loan)	2	(0)
2024	Heart of Midlothian B	8	(0)
2025	Langley United	1	(0)
2025	Unity FC	7	(1)
2025	Gżira United	1	(0)
2026–	Balzan	7	(0)
- * Club domestic league appearances and goals as of April 21, 2026

Lennon Thompson (born January 1, 2005) is a Canadian soccer player who plays for Balzan in the Maltese Challenge League.

== Early life ==
Thompson played youth soccer with Coastal FC, later joining the Vancouver Whitecaps Academy in August 2019. After spending three years with the Whitecaps, he was invited to trial with Sirens F.C. of the Maltese Premier League.

== Club career ==
In 2022, Thompson played with TSS FC Rovers in League1 British Columbia.

In May 2023, he signed a developmental contract with Vancouver FC of the Canadian Premier League, while also playing with their League1 British Columbia affiliate Unity FC. He made his professional debut for Vancouver on June 2, in a substitute appearance against Pacific FC.

On January 7, 2024, Thompson signed with Scottish club Heart of Midlothian B, the reserve team of Heart of Midlothian, in the Lowland Football League for the remainder of the season, following a two-week trial period. On January 26, 2024, he made his debut for Hearts B against the Cumbernauld Colts.

In 2025, he began the season with Langley United in League1 British Columbia, before switching to Unity FC.

In August 2025, he joined Maltese Premier League club Gżira United. In late December 2025, it was announced that he would move to Balzan in the second tier Maltese Challenge League on a permanent transfer.

== Personal life ==
Thompson is the son of former Canadian national team player and former Vancouver FC assistant coach Niall Thompson. Born in Canada, Thompson also holds a Maltese passport.

== Career statistics ==
As of June 25, 2023

Club	Season	League			Playoffs		Domestic Cup		Continental		Total	
Club	Season	Division	Apps	Goals	Apps	Goals	Apps	Goals	Apps	Goals	Apps	Goals
TSS FC Rovers	2022	League1 British Columbia	?	?	?	?	—		—		?	?
Vancouver FC	2023	Canadian Premier League	3	0	–		0	0	–		3	0
Unity FC (loan)	2023	League1 British Columbia	2	0	0	0	–		–		2	0
Heart of Midlothian B	2024–25	Lowland Football League	8	0	—		—		—		8	0
Langley United	2025	League1 British Columbia	1	0	—		—		—		1	0
Unity FC	2025	League1 British Columbia	7	1	—		—		—		7	1
Career total			21	1	0	0	0	0	0	0	21	1
