= 2023 CPL–U Sports Draft =

Fifth annual Canadian Premier League sports draft

General information
- Sport: Soccer
- Date: December 15, 2022
- Time: 3:00 PM ET
- Network: YouTube

Overview
- 16 total selections in 2 rounds
- League: Canadian Premier League
- Teams: 8
- First selection: Anthony White, Vancouver FC

The 2023 CPL–U Sports Draft was the fifth annual CPL–U Sports Draft. Canadian Premier League (CPL) teams selected 16 eligible U Sports soccer players to be invited to their respective preseason camps with the opportunity to earn developmental contracts for the 2023 Canadian Premier League season.

== Format ==
Players could be selected if they had one to four years of U Sports eligibility remaining, were in good academic standing, were planning to return to school the following year, and completed the CPL's draft declaration form by December 9, 2022. On December 12, the CPL released the list of 199 athletes who declared for the draft. Players who were selected can sign a full professional contract or a developmental contract, which allows them to return to university for the following season, without losing their eligibility.

Teams were able to retain the rights to previously drafted players who had signed developmental contracts. Players who had their rights retained and did not enter the draft were: Kareem Sow (HFX Wanderers FC), Jacob Carlos (Valour FC), Markus Kaiser (Cavalry FC), and Luca Ricci (Pacific FC).

Each CPL team made two selections in the draft with selections made in the reverse order of the previous season's standings, including playoffs and final standings. Expansion club Vancouver FC made the first and second picks of the draft but did not make a selection in the second round.

== Player selection ==
| ^{*} | Denotes player who has signed a professional contract for the 2023 season |
| ^{^} | Denotes player who has signed a developmental contract for the 2023 season |

The following players were selected:

=== Round 1 ===
| Pick # | CPL team | Player | Position | Nationality | University | Last team/academy |
|---|---|---|---|---|---|---|
| 1 | Vancouver FC | Anthony White | DF | Canada | Toronto | TSS Rovers FC (L1BC) |
| 2 | Vancouver FC | Ameer Kinani | FW | Iraq (Note: Also holds Canadian citizenship) | TMU | ProStars FC (L1O) |
| 3 | HFX Wanderers FC | Anthony Stolar | DF | Canada | Cape Breton | Scrosoppi FC (L1O) |
| 4 | York United FC | Christopher Campoli | MF | Canada | Ontario Tech | ProStars FC (L1O) |
| 5 | Valour FC | Guillaume Pianelli | DF | France | UQTR | Celtix du Haut-Richelieu (PLSQ) |
| 6 | Pacific FC | Eric Lajeunesse | DF | Canada | British Columbia | Whitecaps FC Academy (L1BC) |
| 7 | Cavalry FC | William Omoreniye | DF | Canada | Calgary | Cavalry FC U20 (AMSL) |
| 8 | Atlético Ottawa | Junior Agyekum | MF | Canada | Thompson Rivers | Rivers FC (L1BC) |
| 9 | Forge FC | Miles Green | MF | Canada | McMaster | Hamilton United (L1O) |

=== Round 2 ===
| Pick # | CPL team | Player | Position | Nationality | University | Last team/academy |
|---|---|---|---|---|---|---|
| 10 | HFX Wanderers FC | Aiden Rushenas | GK | Canada | Dalhousie | |
| 11 | York United FC | Trivine Esprit | MF | Canada | Ontario Tech | Simcoe County Rovers FC (L1O) |
| 12 | Valour FC | Samuel LaPlante | DF | Canada | UQTR | CS Saint-Hubert (PLSQ) |
| 13 | Pacific FC | Brandon Torresan | MF | Canada | Trinity Western | Rivers FC (L1BC) |
| 14 | Cavalry FC | Eryk Kobza | DF | Canada | Calgary | (Poland) Podlasie Biała Podlaska |
| 15 | Atlético Ottawa | Mohamed Bouzidi | FW | Algeria | Carleton | West Ottawa SC (OPDL) |
| 16 | Forge FC | Milo Djuricic | DF | Canada | York | Vaughan Azzurri (L1O) |

== Selection statistics ==
=== Draftees by nationality ===
| Rank | Country | Selections |
|---|---|---|
| 1 | Canada | 14 |
| 2 | France | 1 |
| 3 | Iraq | 1 |

=== Draftees by university ===
| Rank | University | Selections |
|---|---|---|
| 1 | Université du Québec à Trois-Rivières | 2 |
| 1 | Ontario Tech University | 2 |
| 1 | University of Calgary | 2 |
| 4 | 10 universities | 1 |
