= Tyler Crawford =

Canadian soccer player (born 2004)

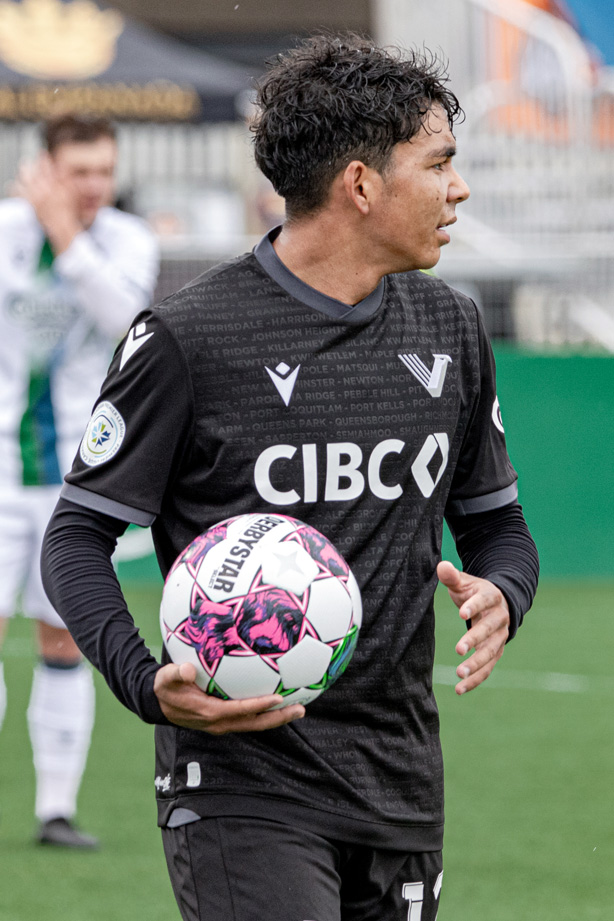
- Crawford playing for Vancouver FC in 2023

Personal information
- Full name: Tyler James Thai Crawford
- Date of birth: March 9, 2004 (age 22)
- Place of birth: Burlington, Ontario, Canada
- Height: 1.73 m (5 ft 8 in)
- Position: Left-back

Team information
- Current team: Thep Xanh Nam Dinh
- Number: 20

Youth career
- Burlington SC
- Columbus Crew

College career
Years	Team	Apps	(Gls)
2022	Michigan State Spartans	16	(0)

Senior career*
Years	Team	Apps	(Gls)
2023–2026	Vancouver FC	36	(0)
2026	→ Langley United (loan)	1	(0)
2026–	Thep Xanh Nam Dinh	2	(0)

International career^{‡}
2022	Canada U20	2	(0)
- * Club domestic league appearances and goals as of September 12, 2026 ‡ National team caps and goals as of February 5, 2023

Tyler James Thai Crawford (born March 9, 2004) is a Canadian professional soccer player who plays as a left-back for V.League 1 club Thep Xanh Nam Dinh.

== Early life ==
Crawford began playing youth soccer at age four with Burlington SC. Afterwards, he moved to Lutz, Florida, in the United States. He later joined the Columbus Crew academy. In 2021, he was named the Columbus Crew Academy Player of the Year.

== College career ==
In 2022, he began attending Michigan State University, where he played for the men's soccer team. On September 12, he recorded an assist against the Chicago State Cougars for his first collegiate point. After one season, he departed Michigan State to turn professional.

== Club career ==
In February 2023, he signed his first professional contract with Vancouver FC of the Canadian Premier League. He made his professional debut on April 22, starting against York United FC. In May 2023, he was named to the CPL Team of the Week for the first time, after helping his team earn a clean sheet in their match that week. He had an injury plagued 2024 season, with multiple injuries keeping him out of the lineup for prolonged spells, limiting him to just eight appearances that season. In January 2025, he signed an extension for the 2025 season, with an option for 2026. In December 2025, he signed another one-year extension with an option for 2027.

In July 2026, Crawford joined Vietnamese club Thep Xanh Nam Dinh in the V.League 1.

== International career ==
Born in Canada and raised in the United States, Crawford is eligible for both national teams. He is also of Vietnamese and Jamaican descent.

In the spring of 2021, he attended a United States Soccer Federation Youth National Team Identification Center camp.

In 2022, he joined the Canada U20 team, playing in two friendlies against Costa Rica U20.

== Career statistics ==
As of July 22, 2026

Club	Season	League			Playoffs		Domestic Cup		Continental		Total	
Club	Season	Division	Apps	Goals	Apps	Goals	Apps	Goals	Apps	Goals	Apps	Goals
Vancouver FC	2023	Canadian Premier League	23	0	—		0	0	—		23	0
Vancouver FC	2024	Canadian Premier League	8	0	—		0	0	—		8	0
Vancouver FC	2025	Canadian Premier League	3	0	—		2	0	—		5	0
Vancouver FC	2026	Canadian Premier League	2	0	—		0	0	2	0	4	0
Vancouver FC	Total		36	0	0	0	2	0	2	0	40	0
Langley United (loan)	2026	British Columbia Premier League	1	0	—		0	0	—		1	0
Career total			37	0	0	0	2	0	2	0	41	0
