= Niall Thompson (soccer, born 1974) =

English-Canadian soccer player and coach (born 1974)

Personal information
- Full name: Niall Joseph Thompson
- Date of birth: 16 April 1974 (age 52)
- Place of birth: Birmingham, England
- Position: Striker

Youth career
- 1990–1991: PSV Eindhoven
- 1991–1992: Crystal Palace

Senior career*
Years	Team	Apps	(Gls)
1990	Edmonton Brick Men	16	(3)
1991	Winnipeg Fury	8	(2)
1992–1994	Crystal Palace	0	(0)
1994–1995	Colchester United	13	(5)
1995	Montreal Impact	9	(0)
1996	Seattle Sounders	15	(0)
1996–1997	Zultse VV	16	(6)
1998	Brentford	8	(0)
1998	Vancouver 86ers	23	(20)
1999–2000	Airdrieonians	25	(5)
2000	Bay Area Seals	6	(2)
2000–2001	Wycombe Wanderers	8	(0)
2001	Montreal Impact	21	(5)
2002–2003	Vancouver Whitecaps	18	(4)
2004–2009	Vancouver Firefighters		

International career
1993–2000	Canada	9	(2)

Managerial career
- 2010–?: Surrey United Firefighters
- 2023: Vancouver FC (assistant)
- * Club domestic league appearances and goals

Niall Joseph Thompson (born 16 April 1974) is a soccer coach and former player. Born in England, he represented Canada at international level.

== Club career ==
Thompson moved to Canada, aged two, and later played for the Edmonton Brick Men and Winnipeg Fury in the Canadian Soccer League. He then played for the PSV Eindhoven youth team. He started his professional career as a trainee with Crystal Palace but after an unsuccessful spell moved to play for Colchester United, before returning to Canada for family reasons. Thompson played for Montreal Impact, Seattle Sounders and Zultse VV, before returning to Canada again to play local football, while waiting for a visa which would allow him to play in the United States. Seattle Sounders expressed interest in re-signing him, but could not due to visa issues. A friend contacted Micky Adams, then-manager of English Second Division side Brentford and Thompson signed for the club on non-contract terms in February 1998. After leaving the Bees in September 1998, Thompson went on to play for Vancouver 86ers, Airdrieonians, Bay Area Seals, Wycombe Wanderers, Montreal Impact and Vancouver Whitecaps.

== International career ==
Thompson represented Canada at the 1991 Pan American Games. He made his senior debut for Canada in a March 1993 friendly match against South Korea and earned a total of nine caps, scoring two goals. He represented Canada in just one FIFA World Cup qualification match, in October 2000. That game, against Panama, proved to be his final international.

== Coaching career ==
Thompson served as a coach with amateur club Surrey United SC, before joining Canadian Premier League club Vancouver FC as an assistant ahead of the 2023 season. He left Vancouver after a single season.

== Personal life ==
He is the father of Lennon Thompson, who is also a soccer player.

== Statistics ==
=== International goals ===
Scores and results list Canada's goal tally first.

#	Date	Venue	Opponent	Score	Result	Competition
1	4 June 1995	Varsity Stadium, Toronto, Ontario, Canada	Turkey	1–2	1–3	Friendly
2	18 May 1998	Varsity Stadium, Toronto, Ontario, Canada	Macedonia	1–0	1–0	Friendly
