= Emmanuel Robe =

French footballer (born 2002)

Personal information
- Full name: Emmanuel Yossua Seri Robe
- Date of birth: 4 December 2002 (age 23)
- Place of birth: Sèvres, France
- Position: Forward

Team information
- Current team: Sittingbourne

Youth career
- Crystal Palace
- Hayes & Yeading United

Senior career*
Years	Team	Apps	(Gls)
2021–2022	Apollon Pontus	0	(0)
2022–2023	Aveley	0	(0)
2022–2023	→ Romford (loan)	14	(4)
2023	Olympias Lympion	4	(0)
2023	Romford	1	(0)
2023	Vancouver FC	4	(0)
2024	Chipstead	20	(5)
2024	Dulwich Hamlet	2	(0)
2025	Hendon	1	(0)
2025	Merstham	17	(5)
2025	Hashtag United	4	(0)
2025	Sittingbourne	5	(0)
2025–2026	Merstham	17	(2)
2026–	Herne Bay	20	(3)
- * Club domestic league appearances and goals as of 30 September 2026

Emmanuel Yossua Seri Robe (born 4 December 2002) is a French footballer who plays as a forward for Isthmian League South East Division club Herne Bay.

== Early life ==
Born in France, Robe moved to South London, England at the age of three with his family. He played youth football with Crystal Palace and Hayes & Yeading United. He was also a track and field athlete, competing in the 100 metres at the national level in the United Kingdom.

== Career ==
In September 2021, he joined Greek club Apollon Pontus in the Super League Greece 2.

In August 2022, he signed with English club Aveley of the seventh tier Isthmian League Premier Division. He made one appearance for Aveley in the Alan Turvey Trophy, before being loaned to Essex Senior League club Romford to gain first team experience, where he scored a brace on his debut against Buckhurst Hill. He then joined Olympias Lympion in the Cypriot second tier, before returning to Romford.

In April 2023, he joined Canadian Premier League club Vancouver FC. In late June 2023, he terminated his contract with the club by mutual consent.

In July 2024, Robe joined Combined Counties League Premier Division South club Chipstead. In August 2024, it was announced that Robe signed with Italian club ASD San Luca in the fifth tier Eccellenza. However, he ultimately did not play and continued with Chipstead.

In December 2024, he joined Isthmian League Premier Division side Dulwich Hamlet. On 23 December 2024, he debuted for the club against Cray Valley Paper Mills. In January 2025, he signed with Hendon in the Isthmian League Premier Division, but departed the club later in the same month. On 28 January 2025, he signed with Merstham in the Isthmian League South and East Division. He also played in the six-a-side Baller League UK for John Terry's team the 26ers. In the summer of 2025, he joined Isthmian League Premier side Hashtag United. In September 2025, he joined Sittingbourne. In October 2025, he returned to Merstham for another stint. In February 2026, he joined Herne Bay. He remained with Herne Bay to start the following season.

== Career statistics ==
As of match played 30 September 2026

Appearances and goals by club, season and competition
Club	Season	League			National cup		Other		Total	
Club	Season	Division	Apps	Goals	Apps	Goals	Apps	Goals	Apps	Goals
Apollon Pontus	2021–22	Super League Greece 2	0	0	0	0	—		0	0
Aveley	2022–23	Isthmian League Premier Division	0	0	0	0	1 (Note: One appearance in Velocity Cup)	0	1	0
Romford (loan)	2022–23	Essex Senior Football League	14	4	6 (Note: Appearance(s) in FA Cup)	4	9 (Note: Five appearances in FA Vase; one appearance, two goals in Peter Butcher Memorial Trophy; three appearances, one goal in Essex Senior Cup)	3	29	11
Olympias Lympion	2022–23	Cypriot Second Division	4	0	0	0	—		4	0
Romford	2022–23	Essex Senior Football League	1	0	0	0	1 (Note: One appearance, one goal in Peter Butcher Memorial Trophy)	1	2	1
Vancouver FC	2023	Canadian Premier League	4	0	1	0	—		5	0
Chipstead	2024–25	Combined Counties Premier Division South	20	5	1	0	3 (Note: Two appearances and two goals in FA Vase, one appearance in Combined Counties Football League Cup)	2	24	7
Dulwich Hamlet	2024–25	Isthmian League Premier Division	2	0	0	0	0	0	2	0
Hendon	2024–25	Isthmian League Premier Division	1	0	0	0	0	0	1	0
Merstham	2024–25	Isthmian League South East Division	17	5	0	0	1 (Note: Appearance in promotion playoffs)	0	18	5
Hashtag United	2025–26	Isthmian League Premier Division	4	0	0	0	0	0	4	0
Sittingbourne	2025–26	Isthmian League Premier Division	5	0	0	0	0	0	5	0
Merstham	2025–26	Isthmian League Premier Division	17	2	0	0	0	0	17	2
Herne Bay	2025–26	Isthmian League Premier Division	14	0	0	0	0	0	14	0
Herne Bay	2026–27	Isthmian League Premier Division	6	3	3	1	2	0	11	4
Career total			109	19	11	5	17	6	137	30
