= Shaan Hundal =

Canadian soccer player (born 1999)

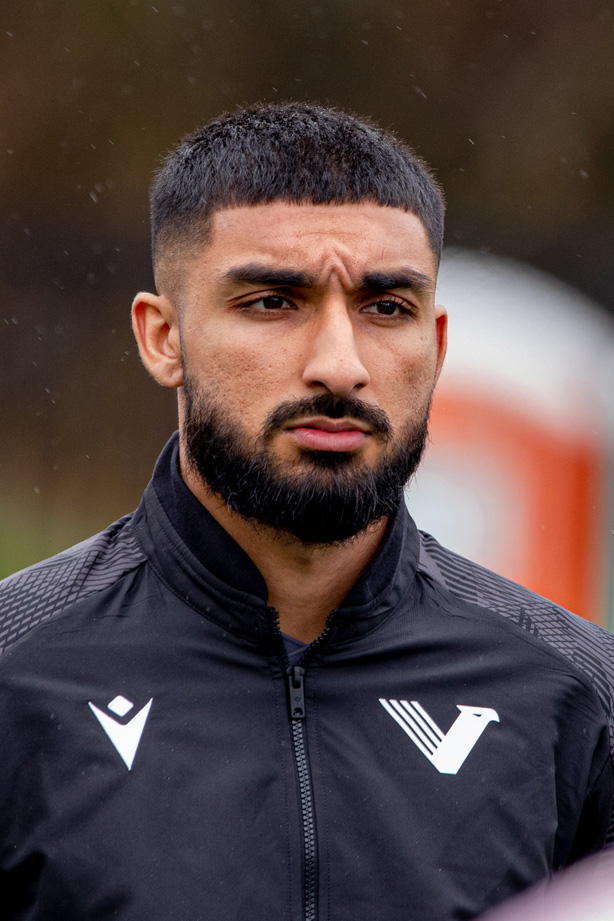
- Hundal with Vancouver FC in 2023

Personal information
- Full name: Shaan Singh Hundal
- Date of birth: July 14, 1999 (age 27)
- Place of birth: Brampton, Ontario, Canada
- Height: 1.81 m (5 ft 11 1/2 in)
- Position: Forward

Team information
- Current team: Pacific FC (on loan from Brooklyn FC)

Youth career
- 2005–2007: Caledon SC
- 2008–2013: Brampton YSC
- 2013–2014: Mississauga SC
- 2014–2015: Toronto FC

Senior career*
Years	Team	Apps	(Gls)
2016–2018	Toronto FC III	3	(4)
2016–2019	Toronto FC II	84	(17)
2019	→ Ottawa Fury (loan)	1	(0)
2020	Valour FC	6	(0)
2021–2022	Inter Miami CF II (Note: Fort Lauderdale CF changed its name to Inter Miami CF II in 2022)	48	(17)
2022	→ Inter Miami (loan)	0	(0)
2023	Vancouver FC	28	(6)
2024–2025	Valour FC	35	(9)
2025	York United FC	14	(5)
2026–	Brooklyn FC	6	(0)
2026–	→ Pacific FC (loan)	8	(0)

International career^{‡}
2016	Canada U18	2	(0)
2016–2017	Canada U20	6	(2)
- * Club domestic league appearances and goals as of October 27, 2026 ‡ National team caps and goals as of May 8, 2019

Shaan Singh Hundal (born July 14, 1999) is a Canadian professional soccer player who plays as a forward for Pacific FC in the Canadian Premier League, on loan from Brooklyn FC in the USL Championship.

== Early life ==
Hundal was born in Canada to Indian Punjabi parents. He began playing youth soccer at age six with Caledon SC. He later played with Brampton Youth SC and Mississauga SC. He was also a member of the Ontario provincial team at the U14 and U15 level. In May 2014, he joined the Toronto FC Academy.

== Club career ==
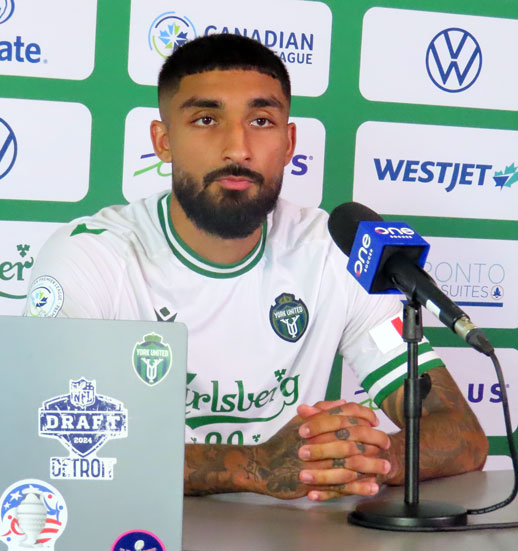
Hundal with York United in 2025

In 2016, he played a match with Toronto FC III in the Premier Development League, and also played with the team for two matches in 2018 in League1 Ontario. He scored a hat trick on May 20, 2018 against Toronto Skillz FC.

In April 2016, he joined Toronto FC II in the USL, as an academy call-up, and made his professional debut on April 9 against FC Montreal. He scored his first professional goal on May 29 against the Wilmington Hammerheads. On September 1, 2016, he officially signed a professional contract with Toronto FC II. He was named to the USL's 20 under 20 list in back to back years, being ranked #13 in 2016 and #4 in 2017. In July 2018, he signed an extension with the team through the 2019 season. In March 2019, he briefly joined the Ottawa Fury on loan. He was later recalled by Toronto FC II, after only making one appearance for the Fury. He departed Toronto after the 2019 season.

In July 2020, Hundal signed with Valour FC in the Canadian Premier League. He had originally joined the club on trial in March, but the COVID-19 pandemic had put a halt to all team training. He made six appearances for the club during the seven-game shortened season, recording two assists. He departed the club following the season.

In April 2021, he signed with Fort Lauderdale CF in USL League One (who later re-branded to Inter Miami II upon their move to MLS Next Pro in 2022). He scored his first goal for the club on April 17, in a 1-0 victory over South Georgia Tormenta FC. On May 2, he scored a brace in a 2-1 victory over the Richmond Kickers. In his first season with the club, he led the team in scoring with 11 goals. At the end of the season, he was named a USL League One Second Team All-Star and was a finalist for the league's Young Player of the Year award. In July 2022, he signed a short-term loan agreement with their Major League Soccer parent club, Inter Miami CF.

In January 2023, Hundal joined newly-established Canadian Premier League side Vancouver FC. On April 22, he scored the first ever goal in the club's history, opening the score-sheet in an eventual 2-1 league win against York United FC, which also represented Vancouver's first ever victory. He began the season on a hot streak, scoring five goals in the first nine matches, ultimately finishing the season with six goals and added one assist, the club declined his option for the 2024 season.

In November 2023, he returned to Valour FC, ahead of the 2024 season, signing a multi-year contract. The club had previously attempted to sign him in the summer of 2023, but was not able to reach a deal with Vancouver on a move. He scored seven goals in his debut season with the club, including six in his final 13 appearances.

In July 2025, he moved to York United in a player swap, with Markiyan Voytsekhovskyy moving to Valour FC in return, signing for the remainder of 2025 with an option for 2026. On August 24, 2025, he scored four goals in a 5-1 victory over Pacific FC, becoming the second player in league history to do so.

In January 2026, he signed with Brooklyn FC in the USL Championship. In late July 2026, Hundal was loaned to Pacific FC in the Canadian Premier League.

== International career ==
In November 2013, Hundal made his debut in the Canadian youth program at a Canada U15 identification camp. After attending multiple camps with the Canada U15, Canada U17, and Canada U18 teams, he was called up to the Canada U20 team for the first time for a camp in November 2016. He was subsequently named to the roster for the 2017 CONCACAF U-20 Championship, where he scored his first international goal against Antigua and Barbuda U20 on February 23, 2017. In January 2018, he was called to a camp with the Canada U23 team.

In 2026, he expressed interest in representing the India national football team.

== Personal life ==
Hundal is of Punjabi Indian descent, and speaks fluent English and Punjabi. His favourite soccer players include Luis Suárez and Sergio Agüero, and he is also a fan of Manchester City.

== Career statistics ==
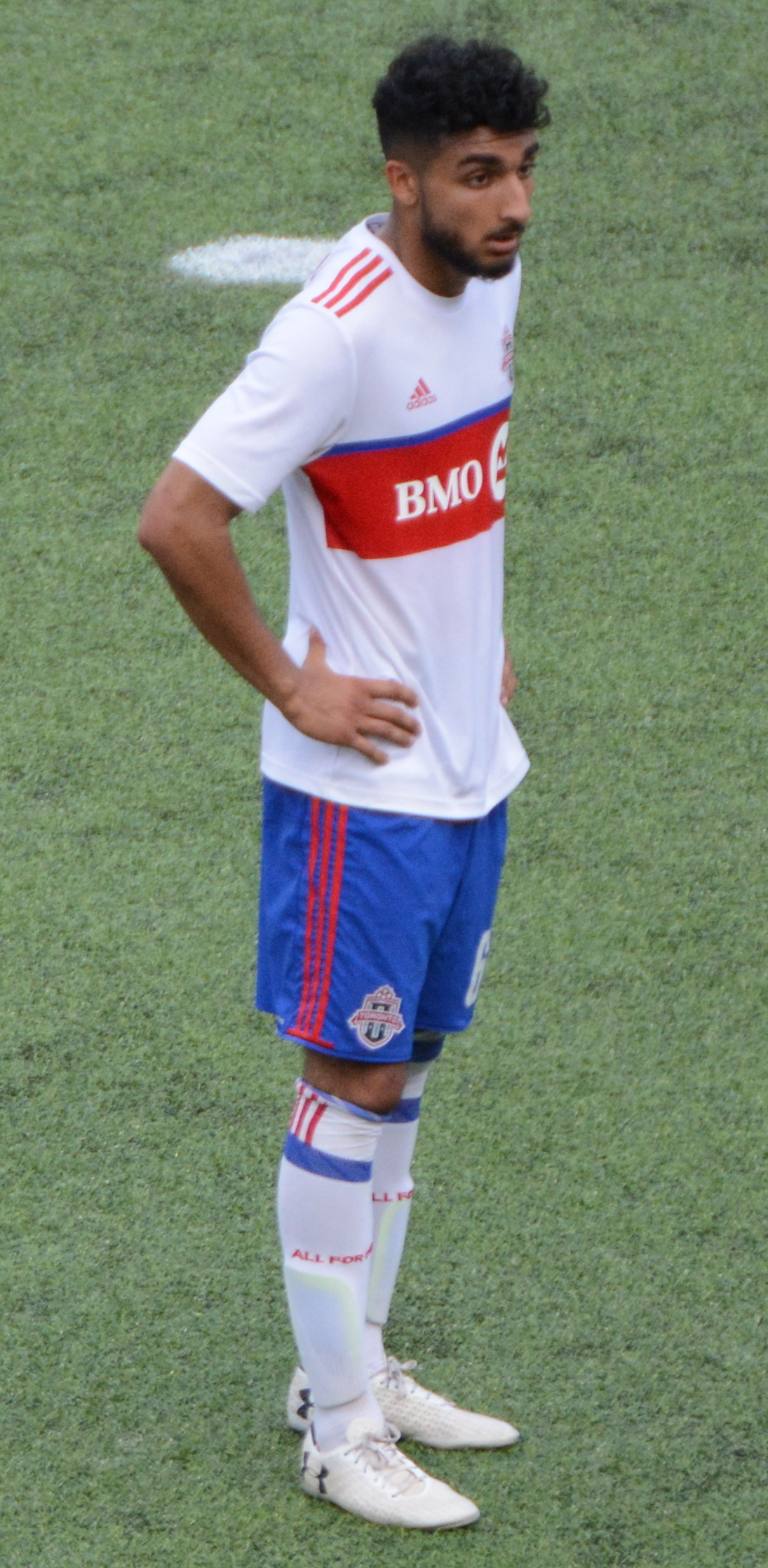
HHnudal with Toronto FC II in 2017

As of March 28, 2026

Club	League	Season	League		Playoffs		Domestic Cup		Other		Total	
Club	League	Season	Apps	Goals	Apps	Goals	Apps	Goals	Apps	Goals	Apps	Goals
Toronto FC III	Premier Development League	2016	1	0	—		—		—		1	0
Toronto FC III	League1 Ontario	2018	2	4	—		—		?	?	2	4
Toronto FC III	Total		3	4	0	0	0	0	?	?	3	4
Toronto FC II	USL	2016	27	6	—		—		—		27	6
Toronto FC II	USL	2017	22	7	—		—		—		22	7
Toronto FC II	USL	2018	24	2	—		—		—		24	2
Toronto FC II	USL League One	2019	11	2	—		—		—		11	2
Toronto FC II	Total		84	17	0	0	0	0	0	0	84	17
Ottawa Fury (loan)	USL Championship	2019	1	0	0	0	0	0	—		1	0
Valour FC	Canadian Premier League	2020	6	0	—		—		—		6	0
Inter Miami CF II	USL League One	2021	27	11	—		—		—		27	11
Inter Miami CF II	MLS Next Pro	2022	20	6	—		—		—		20	6
Inter Miami CF II	Total		47	17	0	0	0	0	0	0	47	17
Vancouver FC	Canadian Premier League	2023	28	6	—		1	0	—		29	6
Valour FC	Canadian Premier League	2024	27	7	—		1	0	—		28	7
Valour FC	Canadian Premier League	2025	8	2	—		2	0	—		10	2
Valour FC	Total		35	9	0	0	3	0	0	0	38	9
York United FC	Canadian Premier League	2025	14	5	2	2	0	0	—		16	7
Brooklyn FC	USL Championship	2026	6	0	0	0	0	0	3	0	9	0
Career Total			224	58	2	2	4	0	3	0	233	60

== See also ==
- List of Sikh footballers
