= Stonehill Skyhawks men's soccer =

Division I college men's soccer team

Stonehill Skyhawks
- Founded: 1962
- University: Stonehill College
- Head coach: Jim Reddish (16th season)
- Conference: NEC; I Division
- Location: Easton, Massachusetts
- Stadium: Skyhawks Field
- Nickname: Skyhawks
- Colors: Purple and white
Home	Away

The Stonehill Skyhawks men's soccer team is an NCAA Division I college soccer team composed of students attending Stonehill College in Easton, Massachusetts, United States. The team is a member of the Northeast Conference, which is part of the National Collegiate Athletic Association's Division I. Stonehill's first men's soccer team was fielded in 1962. The team plays its home games at Skyhawk Field on the campus of Stonehill College. The Skyhawks are coached by Jim Reddish. In 2022, the Skyhawks began play in Division I, reclassified from Division II. Prior to 2022, Stonehill was a founding member of the Northeast-10 Conference in NCAA Division II.

== Current squad ==
As of December 27, 2023

Note: Flags indicate national team as defined under FIFA eligibility rules; some limited exceptions apply. Players may hold more than one non-FIFA nationality.

No.	Pos.	Nation	Player
00	GK	USA	Kyle Tencza
0	GK	USA	Ryan Coutu
1	GK	BRA	Carlos Dias Neto
2	FW	USA	Jared Rapoza
3	DF	USA	Ayden Dias
4	DF	USA	Chris Sederquist
5	MF	USA	Alexander Kuzmich
6	MF	USA	Ethan Cain
7	MF	USA	Iago Luiz De Sousa-Vieira
8	MF	USA	Owen Burke
9	FW	USA	Jacob Woznicki
10	MF	USA	Shon Ryan
11	MF	USA	Nicholas Vitti
12	DF	USA	Ekrem Hadzic
13	MF	USA	Colin Milliken
14	DF	USA	Aidan Doyle
15	MF	USA	Zach Davis
16	FW	BRA	Tiago Lima Bittencourt
17	MF	USA	Colby Meyer
18	MF	USA	Shane Fonseca

No.	Pos.	Nation	Player
19	DF	USA	Benjamin Mazza-Bergeron
20	MF	USA	Ethan Sullivan
21	DF	USA	Finbar O'Connor
22	DF	USA	Ethan O'Connor
23	DF	USA	Terence O'Neill
24	MF	IRL	Lorcan Kennedy
25	MF	USA	Derek Jaramilo
26	DF	USA	Amman Muzaffar
27	MF	USA	Andrew DeBerardinis
28	FW	USA	Preston Thompson
29	DF	USA	Jaxson Kahawai
30	GK	USA	Ryan Claffey
31	DF	USA	Colin Hargraves
32	MF	USA	Seamus O'Keefe
33	FW	CAN	Christian Giancola
34	MF	NOR	Martin Johnsen
35	GK	USA	Tyler Sloan
37	MF	USA	Christopher Hines

== Technical Staff ==
As of December 27, 2023

Position	Name
Head coach	Jim Reddish
Associate Head coach	Andrew Parris
Associate Head coach	Nick Gale
Associate Head coach	Adam Colella

== Stonehill Men's Soccer seasons (Division I) ==
Season	Head coach	Conference Record						Overall Record					Top points		Top scorer		Top assists	
Season	Head coach	Conference	W	L	D	Pct.	Conference Tourn. Pos.	W	L	D	Pct.	NCAA Men's Soccer RPI	Top points		Top scorer		Top assists	
2023	Jim Reddish	NEC; Division I	1	4	3	0.313	7	3	8	5	0.344	196	Jacob Woznicki	22	Jacob Woznicki	9	Jacob Woznicki, Colin Milliken, Shon Ryan	4
2022	Jim Reddish	NEC; Division I	1	5	2	0.250	9	3	12	2	0.235	207	Jacob Woznicki	15	Jacob Woznicki	7	Aidan O'Sullivan	2

== All-NEC Players ==
All-NEC First Team:

- Jacob Woznicki – 2023

All-NEC Second Team:

- Colin Milliken – 2023
- Jacob Woznicki – 2022

All-NEC Rookie Team:

- Tiago Lima Bittencourt – 2023
