= Anthony White (soccer) =

Canadian soccer player (born 2003)

Personal information
- Date of birth: August 1, 2003 (age 23)
- Place of birth: Port Moody, British Columbia, Canada
- Height: 6 ft 2 in (1.88 m)
- Position: Centre-back

Youth career
- Port Moody SC
- Coquitlam Metro-Ford SC

College career
Years	Team	Apps	(Gls)
2021–2022	Toronto Varsity Blues	24	(1)

Senior career*
Years	Team	Apps	(Gls)
2022	TSS FC Rovers		
2023–2024	Vancouver FC	21	(0)
2025	Evolution FC	4	(0)
- * Club domestic league appearances and goals as of June 15, 2025

Anthony White (born August 1, 2003) is a Canadian professional soccer player who plays as a centre-back.

== Early life ==
White began playing youth soccer with Port Moody SC. Afterwards, he played youth soccer with Coquitlam Metro-Ford SC. He also captained the British Columbia provincial team and had trials with the youth teams of Croatian clubs Dinamo Zagreb (in 2016 and 2017) and HNK Šibenik (in 2019), German club 1. FC Nürnberg (in 2018), and the Vancouver Whitecaps Academy. In 2019, White was part of a group of 16 Generation Adidas players invited to train in Spain with Real Madrid and at the Spanish national training centre.

== University career ==
In 2021, White began attending the University of Toronto, where he played for the men's soccer team. He scored his first goal on October 23, 2021 against the Algoma Thunderbirds. In 2022, he was named an OUA East Second Team All-Star.

== Club career ==
In May 2022, he joined TSS FC Rovers in League1 British Columbia. He helped the club win the 2022 championship, starting in the championship final victory over Varsity FC.

In December 2022, White was selected first overall in the 2023 CPL-U Sports Draft by Vancouver FC, becoming the youngest player ever to be selected with the first pick. After attending pre-season with the club, he signed a two-year professional contract with Vancouver in March 2023, with an option to extend the deal until 2026. He made his professional debut on April 22, in a substitute appearance, against York United FC. After limited playing time to start the season, he earned his first start on June 17 against Atlético Ottawa, which led to a string of 16 consecutive starts. In late June, he was named to the CPL Team of the Week for the first time.

== Personal life ==
He has a brother, Nikolas, who also plays soccer as a centre-back; the two played together for TSS FC Rovers, where they won the League1 BC Championship in 2022.

== Career statistics ==
As of June 15, 2024

Club	Season	League			Playoffs		Domestic Cup		Continental		Total	
Club	Season	Division	Apps	Goals	Apps	Goals	Apps	Goals	Apps	Goals	Apps	Goals
Vancouver FC	2023	Canadian Premier League	20	0	–		0	0	–		20	0
Vancouver FC	2024	Canadian Premier League	1	0	–		0	0	–		1	0
Vancouver FC	Total		21	0	0	0	0	0	0	0	21	0
Evolution FC	2025	League1 British Columbia	4	0	–		–		–		4	0
Career total			25	0	0	0	0	0	0	0	25	0
