= Nathaniel St. Louis =

Canadian soccer player (born 2000)

Personal information
- Date of birth: December 5, 2000 (age 25)
- Place of birth: Toronto, Ontario, Canada
- Height: 5 ft 9 in (1.75 m)
- Position: Forward

Youth career
- Mooredale SC
- North Toronto Nitros
- Markham SC
- Vaughan Azzurri

College career
Years	Team	Apps	(Gls)
2018	Syracuse Orange	2	(0)
2019–2022	UAB Blazers	58	(11)

Senior career*
Years	Team	Apps	(Gls)
2023	Vancouver FC	4	(0)
2024	Simcoe County Rovers FC	10	(0)
2024	→ Simcoe County Rovers FC B	7	(2)
- * Club domestic league appearances and goals as of September 2, 2024

Nathaniel St. Louis (born December 5, 2000) is a Canadian soccer player.

== Early life ==
Afterwards, he played with Markham SC, winning an OYSL championship with the team and also played with the Ontario provincial team. Afterwards, he played with Vaughan Azzurri. He had trials with Portuguese club Benfica and English club West Ham United.

== College career ==
In February 2018, he committed to attend Syracuse University, where he played for the men's soccer team. He made his collegiate debut on October 8 against the Ohio State Buckeyes, recording an assist in the match.

In 2019, he transferred to the University of Alabama at Birmingham, joining their men's soccer team. He scored his first goal on October 29, 2019 against the Georgia State Panthers. In 2021, he was named an All-Conference USA Second Team All-Star.

== Club career ==
In January 2023, he signed his first professional contract with Vancouver FC of the Canadian Premier League. After signing with Vancouver, he was sent on a two-week trial with English Championship club Huddersfield Town, prior to the CPL season. He made his debut on April 19 in a Canadian Championship match against York United FC. He made his league debut on April 22, in a substitute appearance, also against York United FC. After the season, the club declined his option for the 2024 season.

In February 2024, he signed with League1 Ontario club Simcoe County Rovers FC.

== Career statistics ==
As of September 2, 2024

Club	Season	League			Playoffs		Domestic Cup		League Cup		Total	
Club	Season	Division	Apps	Goals	Apps	Goals	Apps	Goals	Apps	Goals		
Vancouver FC	2023	Canadian Premier League	4	0	—		1	0	—		5	0
Simcoe County Rovers FC	2024	League1 Ontario Premier	10	0	—		0	0	0	0	10	0
Simcoe County Rovers FC B	2024	League2 Ontario	7	2	—		—		—		7	2
Career total			21	2	0	0	1	0	0	0	22	2
