= James Cameron (soccer) =

Canadian soccer player (born 2005)

Personal information
- Full name: James Alexander Cameron
- Date of birth: January 24, 2005 (age 21)
- Place of birth: North Vancouver, British Columbia, Canada
- Height: 1.83 m (6 ft 0 in)
- Position: Defender

Youth career
- North Vancouver FC
- Mountain United FC
- Blaise Soccer Academy

Senior career*
Years	Team	Apps	(Gls)
2023–2024	Vancouver FC	36	(1)
2023	→ Unity FC (loan)	3	(0)
2025–2026	Colorado Rapids 2	36	(2)

International career^{‡}
2024	Canada U20	7	(0)
- * Club domestic league appearances and goals as of October 23, 2026 ‡ National team caps and goals as of July 30, 2024

James Alexander Cameron (born January 24, 2005) is a Canadian soccer player who most recently played for Colorado Rapids 2 in MLS Next Pro.

== Early life ==
Cameron played youth soccer with North Vancouver FC, Mountain United FC, and the Blaise Soccer Academy. He represented British Columbia at the 2022 Canada Summer Games, helping them to a fifth-place finish.

== Club career ==
=== Vancouver FC ===
After having attended the club's open trials in February 2023, in May 2023, Cameron signed a developmental contract with Vancouver FC of the Canadian Premier League, while also playing with their League1 British Columbia affiliate Unity FC. Cameron made his professional debut for Vancouver on June 11, coming on as a substitute against Cavalry FC. He made his first start in the next match on June 17, against Atlético Ottawa. He subsequently appeared in every match, expect for one, for the remainder of the season. In July 2023, he signed a full professional contract with the club, through the Exceptional Young Talent provision. He was named to the CPL Team of the Week for the first time, for Week 17 in August 2023, after being named man of the match against Valour FC. On September 9 he scored his first professional goal, scoring the game-winning goal in stoppage time in a 2-1 victory over Atlético Ottawa. At the end of the season, he was nominated for the CPL U21 Player of the Year award, which was ultimately won by Matteo De Brienne. In November 2023, Vancouver announced Cameron would trial with Luton Town's U21 team, after which he would continue to trial with other Premier League clubs. After the 2024 season, the club picked up his option for the 2025 season.

=== Colorado Rapids 2 ===
In early 2025, he went on trial with Colorado Rapids 2 of MLS Next Pro, with visa issues holding up an official transfer. In February 2025, the move was officially finalized. On August 10, 2025, he scored his first goal in a match against St. Louis City SC 2. In October 2026 the Rapids would announce Cameron would be out of contract after the 2026 season, ending his time with the club.

== International career ==
In February 2024, Cameron was called up for international duty for the first time, being named to the Canada U20 for the 2024 CONCACAF Under-20 Championship qualifiers. He started the first match against Dominica U20, and came off the bench in the next two matches against Saint Vincent and the Grenadines U20 and Trinidad and Tobago U20. He was then subsequently called up to the squad for the official tournament in July.

== Career statistics ==
As of October 23, 2026

Club	Season	League			Playoffs		Domestic Cup		Continental		Total	
Club	Season	Division	Apps	Goals	Apps	Goals	Apps	Goals	Apps	Goals	Apps	Goals
Vancouver FC	2023	Canadian Premier League	19	1	–		0	0	–		19	1
Vancouver FC	2024	Canadian Premier League	17	0	–		1	0	–		18	0
Vancouver FC	Total		36	1	0	0	1	0	0	0	37	1
Unity FC (loan)	2023	League1 British Columbia	3	0	0	0	–		–		3	0
Colorado Rapids 2	2025	MLS Next Pro	20	5	4	2	–		–		24	7
Colorado Rapids 2	2026	MLS Next Pro	16	2	–		–		–		16	2
Colorado Rapids 2	Total		36	7	4	2	0	0	0	0	40	9
Career total			75	8	4	2	1	0	0	0	80	10
