= Cristian Mares =

Mexican footballer (born 2004)

Personal information
- Full name: Cristian Jassiel Mares Sánchez
- Date of birth: 12 September 2004 (age 22)
- Place of birth: León, Mexico
- Height: 1.78 m (5 ft 10 in)
- Position: Winger

Team information
- Current team: Atlético San Luis
- Number: 194

Youth career
- 2018–2023: Puebla
- 2025–: Atlético San Luis

Senior career*
Years	Team	Apps	(Gls)
2023–2025	Puebla	5	(0)
2023	→ Vancouver FC (loan)	0	(0)
- * Club domestic league appearances and goals as of 7 February 2025

Cristian Jassiel Mares Sánchez (born 12 September 2004) is a Mexican professional footballer who plays for Atlético San Luis.

== Early life ==
He joined the youth system of Puebla at U15 level, progressing through to the U20 level.

== Club career ==
In April 2022, he made the bench for two Liga MX matches with Puebla, but did not appear in either match. In February 2023, he joined Canadian Premier League club Vancouver FC on loan. However, in April, it was announced that they mutually agreed to terminate the loan, prior to the beginning of the season, and he returned to Puebla. He made his Liga MX debut on 14 July 2024 against Necaxa.

In 2025, he joined Atlético San Luis.

== International career ==
In October 2020 and January 2021, he was called to training camps with the Mexico U17 team.
