= Gabriel Bitar =

Footballer (born 1998)

- Bitar with Lebanon in 2024

Personal information
- Full name: Gabriel Walid Bitar
- Date of birth: August 23, 1998 (age 28)
- Place of birth: Ottawa, Ontario, Canada
- Height: 1.78 m (5 ft 10 in)
- Positions: Midfielder; forward

Team information
- Current team: Inter Toronto
- Number: 20

Youth career
- Ottawa Internationals SC
- Ottawa Fury FC

College career
Years	Team	Apps	(Gls)
2017–2021	Carleton Ravens	51	(40)

Senior career*
Years	Team	Apps	(Gls)
2015–2016	Ottawa Fury FC Academy	21	(9)
2017	Ottawa South United	13	(6)
2019	Cavalry FC	1	(0)
2020	Ottawa South United	7	(4)
2021	Ansar (Note: Trial only)	0	(0)
2022	FC Edmonton	21	(5)
2023–2024	Vancouver FC	51	(10)
2025–	Inter Toronto (Note: York United FC changed its name to Inter Toronto FC in 2026)	30	(6)
2026–	→ Inter Toronto II	1	(2)

International career^{‡}
2022–	Lebanon	16	(0)
- * Club domestic league appearances and goals as of August 7, 2026 ‡ National team caps and goals as of June 4, 2026

Gabriel Walid Bitar (Arabic: غبريال وليد بيطار; born August 23, 1998) is a professional footballer who plays as a midfielder or forward for Canadian Premier League club Inter Toronto. Born in Canada, he plays for the Lebanon national team.

== Early life ==
Bitar was born in Ottawa, Ontario, Canada, to Lebanese parents from the capital Beirut. He began playing soccer with the Ottawa Internationals at age four, later attending Franco-Cité Catholic High School and joining the Ottawa Fury Academy.

== University career ==
In 2017, Bitar began attending Carleton University playing for the men's soccer team. In his first year, he was the top scorer in the country with 16 goals, as he won the OUA East Division Rookie of the Year, OUA East Division MVP, and U Sports Rookie of the Year awards and was named a First Team All-Canadian and First-Team OUA East All-Star, helping the Ravens to an OUA silver medal, scoring an additional four goals during the national tournament.

In 2018, he finished third in the OUA in goals with 13 and added another five in the national tournament, while being named a Second Team All-Canadian and First Team OUA All-Star, as the Ravens won the bronze medal at the national championship. In 2019, Bitar was a First Team OUA All-Star and Second Team All-Canadian.

After the 2020 season was cancelled due to the COVID-19 pandemic, Bitar returned for 2021, helping the Ravens win a silver medal at the national championships, while being named a Tournament All-Star as well as an OUA East All-Star during the season.

== Club career ==
=== Early career ===
Bitar was part of the Ottawa Fury FC Academy and played for their Première ligue de soccer du Québec team in 2015 and 2016. In 2017, Bitar played for League1 Ontario side Ottawa South United, scoring six goals in 13 league appearances, and playing once in the L1O Cup.

=== Cavalry FC ===
Bitar was the first overall draft pick in the inaugural CPL–U Sports Draft, where he was picked by Cavalry FC of the Canadian Premier League on November 12, 2018. He signed with the club on April 24, 2019, and made his debut for Cavalry against Pacific FC in a Canadian Championship match on May 16. In August 2019, Cavalry announced that Bitar would return to Carleton University for the 2019 USports season. He was picked again by Cavalry in the 2019 CPL–U Sports Draft, this time sixth overall, but he did not join them for the 2020 season.

=== Ottawa South United ===
In 2020, he returned to Ottawa South United, who moved from League1 Ontario to the Première Ligue de soccer du Québec, where he previously played when he was a member of the Ottawa Fury Academy.

=== Ansar ===
On July 4, 2021, Bitar moved to Ansar in the Lebanese Premier League on trial for the 2021 Lebanese Elite Cup. He made his debut on July 12, scoring a brace against Akhaa Ahli Aley in the group stage. Bitar scored his third goal against Ahed on July 16. Despite scoring three goals in two games, Bitar decided not to sign a contract with Ansar, due to the economic situation in Lebanon.

=== FC Edmonton ===
On March 28, 2022, Bitar returned to the Canadian Premier League, signing with FC Edmonton. With Edmonton, he switched positions from his typical forward role to being deployed primarily as a midfielder. He scored his first goal on June 27, in a 3–1 defeat to former club Cavalry FC.

=== Vancouver FC ===
In January 2023, Bitar signed with expansion side Vancouver FC. He scored his first goal for the club on July 7, in a 2–1 victory over the HFX Wanderers. On August 19, Bitar scored a brace to help Vancouver win 3–2 against Pacific FC. In his first season with the club, he finished tied for the team lead in goals, with six. On July 5, 2024, during the 2024 season, Bitar scored a brace in a 3–3 draw with Forge FC earning CPL Player of the Week and Team of the Week honours.

=== Inter Toronto ===
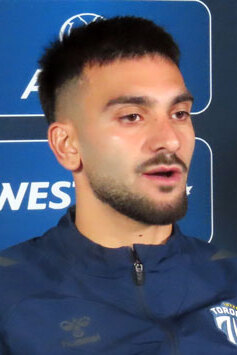
Bitar in an interview with Inter Toronto in 2026

In January 2025, York United FC acquired Bitar in exchange for a first-round pick in the 2026 CPL–U Sports Draft, with Bitar signing a new two-year contract with the club. He scored his first goal for York United FC on April 13, 2025, in a 2–1 defeat to HFX Wanderers FC. On July 19, 2025, Bitar scored a brace in a 4–0 win against his former club Vancouver FC. He finished the 2025 CPL season with five goals and two assists.

Following York United's rebranding as Inter Toronto FC in 2026, Bitar remained with the club on a contract guaranteed through the 2026 CPL season. On April 19, 2026, he scored the only goal in a 1–0 victory over Vancouver FC. In September 2026, Bitar sustained an ACL injury.

== International career ==
Bitar was eligible to represent Canada through birth and Lebanon through descent.

=== Canada ===
In September 2015, Bitar participated in an identification camp for the Canada national under-20 team.

=== Lebanon ===
In December 2022, Bitar accepted a call-up to the Lebanon national team for a friendly game against the United Arab Emirates. He made his debut on December 30 as a substitute in the match, in an eventual 1–0 defeat. In December 2023, Bitar was included in the Lebanese squad for the 2023 AFC Asian Cup. He made two appearances at the tournament.

== Career statistics ==
=== Club ===
As of match played August 7, 2026

Appearances and goals by club, season and competition
Club	Season	League			Playoffs		Domestic cup (Note: Includes Canadian Championship, Lebanese FA Cup)		League cup (Note: Includes Coupe PLSQ, L1O Cup, Lebanese Elite Cup)		Continental		Total	
Club	Season	Division	Apps	Goals	Apps	Goals	Apps	Goals	Apps	Goals	Apps	Goals	Apps	Goals
Ottawa Fury FC Academy	2015	Première Ligue de soccer du Québec	6	3	—		—		0	0	—		6	3
Ottawa Fury FC Academy	2016	Première Ligue de soccer du Québec	15	6	—		—		1	0	—		16	6
Ottawa Fury FC Academy	Total		21	9	0	0	0	0	1	0	0	0	22	9
Ottawa South United	2017	League1 Ontario	13	6	—		—		1	0	—		14	6
Cavalry FC	2019	Canadian Premier League	1	0	0	0	2	0	—		—		3	0
Ottawa South United	2020	Première Ligue de soccer du Québec	7	4	—		—		—		—		7	4
Ansar	2021–22	Lebanese Premier League	0	0	—		0	0	2	3	0	0	2	3
FC Edmonton	2022	Canadian Premier League	21	5	—		1	0	—		—		22	5
Vancouver FC	2023	Canadian Premier League	25	6	—		1	0	—		—		26	6
Vancouver FC	2024	Canadian Premier League	26	4	—		1	0	—		—		27	4
Vancouver FC	Total		51	10	0	0	2	0	0	0	0	0	53	10
York United FC	2025	Canadian Premier League	24	5	2	0	1	0	—		—		27	5
Inter Toronto	2026	Canadian Premier League	6	1	—		1	0	—		—		7	1
Inter Toronto	Total		30	6	2	0	2	0	0	0	0	0	34	6
Inter Toronto II	2026	Ontario Premier League 2	1	2	—		—		—		—		1	2
Career total			145	42	2	0	7	0	4	3	0	0	158	45

=== International ===
As of match played June 4, 2026

Appearances and goals by national team and year
National team	Year	Apps	Goals
Lebanon	2022	1	0
Lebanon	2023	1	0
Lebanon	2024	9	0
Lebanon	2025	4	0
Lebanon	2026	1	0
Total		16	0

== Honours ==
Individual

- Lebanese Elite Cup top goalscorer: 2021 (Note: Tied with Fadel Antar)

== See also ==
- List of Lebanon international footballers born outside Lebanon
