= Jeremy Zielinski =

Canadian soccer player (born 1999)

Personal information
- Full name: Jeremy Todd Zielinski
- Date of birth: January 1, 1999 (age 27)
- Place of birth: Sunnyvale, California, United States
- Height: 6 ft 3 in (1.91 m)
- Position: Goalkeeper

College career
Years	Team	Apps	(Gls)
2017	Stonehill Skyhawks	6	(0)
2019–2022	Hawaii Pacific Sharks	44	(0)

Senior career*
Years	Team	Apps	(Gls)
2022	San Francisco City FC		
2023	Vancouver FC	1	(0)
2024	Kamphaengphet FC	9	(0)
- * Club domestic league appearances and goals as of November 25, 2024

Jeremy Todd Zielinki (born January 1, 1999) is an American soccer player.

== College career ==
In 2017, Zielinski began attending Stonehill College, where he played for the men's soccer team.

In 2019, he began attending Hawaii Pacific University, where he played for the men's soccer team. He made his debut on September 21 against the Simon Fraser Clan. In November 2019, he was named PacWest Conference Player of the Week. In November 2021, he was once again named PacWest Conference Player of the Week. In 2021, in his third season with Hawaii Pacific, he was named PacWest Conference Goalkeeper of the Year, named to the All-PacWest Conference First Team, and the Division II Conference Commissioners Association All-West Region Second Team. In August 2022, he was named PacWest Defender of the Week. In his final season in 2022, he was named to the All-PacWest Conference Third Team.

== Club career ==
In 2022, Zielinski played with San Francisco City FC in USL League Two.

In February 2023, he signed a professional contract with Vancouver FC of the Canadian Premier League, after attending their open trials. He made his professional debut on July 7, 2023, earning his first victory, in a 2–1 win over the HFX Wanderers. After the season, the club declined his option for the 2024 season.

In the summer of 2024, he joined Thai League 3 Northern Region club Kamphaengphet FC.

== Personal ==
Zielinski is a dual citizen and has both American and Canadian nationality.
