= Udoka Chima =

Footballer (born 2002)

Personal information
- Full name: Udoka Godwill Chima
- Date of birth: 1 February 2002 (age 24)
- Place of birth: Italy
- Height: 1.80 m (5 ft 11 in)
- Position: Defender

Youth career
- Lace FC
- 2018–2020: Burnley

Senior career*
Years	Team	Apps	(Gls)
2019–2020	Burnley	0	(0)
2019	→ Steeton AFC (loan)	4	(0)
2021–2022	Queen of the South	1	(0)
2022	Cheshunt	0	(0)
2022	Harrow Borough	2	(0)
2022	Kings Langley	5	(1)
2023	Cavalry FC	13	(0)
2023	Worthing	0	(0)
2024	Fola Esch	4	(0)
2024	St Albans City	0	(0)
2024–2025	Carshalton Athletic	4	(0)
2025	Gute	8	(1)
2025	Welling United	2	(0)

International career
- Nigeria U19
- * Club domestic league appearances and goals as of 14:49, 1 December 2025 (UTC)

Udoka Godwill Chima (born 1 February 2002) is a footballer who plays as a defender. Born in Italy and raised in England, he represented Nigeria at international level.

== Early life ==
Chima was born in Italy to Nigerian parents and lived between the two countries until his family moved to England when he was six. He played grassroots football for a couple of years with Lace FC, a club based in Tottenham, North London. Afterwards, he sought to join an academy program: following trials with the academies of Barnet, Coventry City, Norwich City, and Luton Town, in July 2018, he joined the youth system of Burnley. He was eventually released by Burnley at the end of the 2019-20 season.

Following his release from Burnley, he had a trial with Serie A club Napoli in September 2020, along with reported interest from Atalanta and Genoa, as well as French club Dijon. He then had a trial with Primeira Liga club Benfica from 29 April to 9 May 2021, with fellow Portuguese clubs Braga and Porto also interested in signing him. Following this, he received interest from Newcastle United, before subsequently joined Coventry City on a trial in July 2021, playing in a pre-season match with the U23s against Leamington.

== Club career ==
In August 2019, Chima was loaned by Burnley to Steeton, a club in the North West Counties Football League Division One South, until the end of September.

In July 2021, he signed a two-year contract with Scottish Championship club Queen of the South. He made his debut on 31 July 2021, in a substitute appearance against Partick Thistle. In May 2022, he mutually terminated his contract with the club.

On 2 September 2022, Chima joined National League South side Cheshunt. However, just ten days later, he made a permanent switch to Southern League Premier South side Harrow Borough. Soon after again, he moved to Southern League Premier Central club Kings Langley on 30 September, scoring on his debut on 1 October, in a match against Bromsgrove Sporting. Afterwards, he spent some time training with Onside Football Institute in England, while looking for a new club.

On 13 February 2023, Chima joined Canadian Premier League club Cavalry FC on a one-year contract, with a club option for another season. Upon completion of the 2023 season, Chima's contract would be terminated by mutual consent, ending his time with the club.

On 9 December 2023, he officially returned to England by joining National League South club Worthing. He departed at the end of December, not having featured in any matches due to a hamstring injury.

In March 2024, Chima joined Luxembourg National Division club Fola Esch.

In November 2024, Chima joined National League South side St Albans City. The following month, he was playing for Isthmian League side Carshalton Athletic.

In February 2025, he joined Swedish Division 2 side Gute in the fourth tier.

On 4 November 2025, Chima joined Isthmian League Premier Division club Welling United, however he departed the club before the end of the month.

== International career ==
Chima has played for the Nigeria U19 team.
