= Bradley Vliet =

Dutch footballer

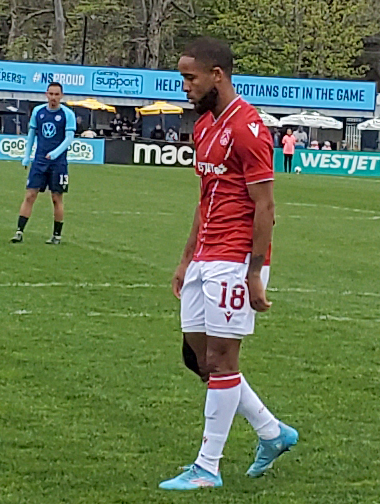
- Vliet in 2022 with Cavalry

Personal information
- Full name: Bradley Miguel Dirk Vliet
- Date of birth: 24 March 1998 (age 28)
- Place of birth: Rotterdam, Netherlands
- Height: 1.74 m (5 ft 9 in)
- Position: Left-back

Youth career
- –2012: Feyenoord
- 2012–2015: Sparta Rotterdam
- 2015–2017: NAC Breda

Senior career*
Years	Team	Apps	(Gls)
2017–2018	NAC Breda	0	(0)
2019	Cambuur	0	(0)
2019–2020	Lokomotiva	0	(0)
2020–2022	Dordrecht	28	(0)
2022	Cavalry FC	21	(0)
2023	Pacific FC	14	(0)
2024	Arabian Falcons		
2024	Dubai City		
- * Club domestic league appearances and goals as of 24 February 2024

Bradley Miguel Dirk Vliet (born 24 March 1998) is a Dutch professional footballer who plays as a left back.

== Club career ==
=== Early career ===
Born in Rotterdam, Vliet played in the youth systems of Feyenoord, Sparta Rotterdam and NAC Breda. In the 2017–18 season, he sat on the bench for a few games for NAC in the Eredivisie, but did not make his senior debut. In 2018, he was on trial at RKC Waalwijk, but this did not result in a contract.

At the beginning of 2019, he joined the second team of SC Cambuur, and played in the Beloften Eredivisie. However, once again, he did not make an appearance for the first team. In 2019, after a trial period at SC Telstar, he left for Croatian Prva HNL club NK Lokomotiva. He did not play there either, and during the 2019–20 season he even trialled with ADO Den Haag in February, without this amounting to a move.

=== Dordrecht ===
In the summer of 2020, Vliet joined FC Dordrecht on a free transfer. On 30 August 2020, he finally made his professional debut, in the 0–0 home draw against Go Ahead Eagles. He came on as a substitute for Nikolas Agrafiotis in the 79th minute.

=== Cavalry FC ===
On 30 April 2022, Vliet signed with Canadian Premier League side Cavalry FC. Vliet's contract option for the 2023 season would be declined as a result of international roster requirements.

=== Pacific FC ===
On 13 January 2023, Canadian Premier League side Pacific FC signed Vliet to a 2-year contract, with a club option for the 2025 season. After the 2023 season, he departed the club by mutual consent.

=== Arabian Falcons ===
In February 2024, Vliet signed with UAE Third Division League club Arabian Falcons FC.
