= Eugene Martínez (footballer, born 1997) =

Belizean professional footballer (born 1997)

Personal information
- Full name: Eugene Chris Martínez
- Date of birth: 20 October 1997 (age 29)
- Place of birth: Belize City, Belize
- Height: 1.85 m (6 ft 1 in)
- Position: Defender

College career
Years	Team	Apps	(Gls)
2018–2019	Cerritos Falcons	44	(2)
2021–2022	Cal Poly Pomona Broncos	36	(3)

Senior career*
Years	Team	Apps	(Gls)
2015–2016	Wagiya		
2016–2017	Belmopan Bandits		
2017	Dangria YFA		
2017–2018	Belize Defence Force		
2018	L.A. Wolves FC		
2022–2023	Flash FC		
2023	Vancouver FC	11	(0)
2023	Verdes FC		
2024–2025	LA 10 FC		
2025–2026	Belmopan FC		
2026–	L.A. Wolves FC		

International career^{‡}
2022–	Belize	24	(3)
- * Club domestic league appearances and goals as of September 10, 2026 ‡ National team caps and goals as of 14 November 2026

Eugene Chris Martínez (born 20 October 1997), also known as Pele Martínez, is a Belizean professional footballer who plays as a defender for L.A. Wolves FC in the United Premier Soccer League and the Belize national football team.

== College career ==
In 2018, he began attending Cerritos College where he played for the men's soccer team. He scored his first collegiate goal on 27 August 2019 against the Fullerton Hornets. In 2018, he was named to the All-South Coast Conference Second Team. In 2018, he was named to the All-South Coast Conference First Team.

In 2021, he began attending California State Polytechnic University, Pomona, where he played for the men's soccer team. He scored his first goal on 2 September 2021 against the Point Loma Sea Lions. In 2022, he earned All-CCAA honorable mention honours.

== Club career ==
Martínez spent the early part of his career in the Premier League of Belize, playing with Wagiya SC (2015–2016), Belmopan Bandits (2016–17), Dangria Youth Futbol Academy (2017), and Belize Defence Force FC (2017–18).

In 2018, Martínez played with L.A. Wolves FC in the United Premier Soccer League.

In 2022, he began playing with Flash FC in the United Premier Soccer League, and in 2023 he helped them reach the semi-finals of the UPSL SoCal Regional Cup, scoring four goals.

In February 2023, Martínez signed with Vancouver FC of the Canadian Premier League, after participating in the club's open trials. He was named to the league's Team of the Week for the first time in May for Week 7. In June 2023, Martínez was suspended for three games after elbowing Cavalry FC player Roberto Alarcón in their match on June 11. In August 2023, he agreed to mutually terminate his contract with the club.

In October 2023, he returned to Belize and joined Verdes FC.

In 2024, he joined LA10 FC in the United Premier Soccer League.

In July 2025, he returned to his former club Belmopan FC (formerly Belmopan Bandits) in the Premier League of Belize.

In 2026, he returned to his former club L.A. Wolves FC in the UPSL, serving as team captain.

== International career ==
While in high school, he attracted the attention of the Belize youth national team, playing with them and having plenty of success.

In 2022, he represented the Belize senior national team in the 2022–23 CONCACAF Nations League B. He was again called up to the squad in March 2023, becoming Vancouver FC's first international player in the process.

== Personal life ==
Martinez founded the Pele Soccer Foundation in his native country of Belize, which teaches youth the fundamentals of football, collects new clothes and equipment for the children, and instills the importance of pursuing an education. During his time playing abroad, he extended the program to help youth in Vancouver and Los Angeles.
