= Ibrahim Bakare =

English footballer (born 2002)

Personal information
- Full name: Ibrahim Akorede Abayomi Bakare
- Date of birth: 7 May 2002 (age 24)
- Place of birth: Lambeth, England
- Height: 1.88 m (6 ft 2 in)
- Positions: Defender; defensive midfielder

Team information
- Current team: Eastleigh

Youth career
- Mass Elite Academy
- 2018–2019: Morecambe
- 2021–2022: Cardiff City

Senior career*
Years	Team	Apps	(Gls)
2019–2020	Morecambe	0	(0)
2019–2020	→ Lancaster City (loan)	6	(0)
2022	Weymouth	1	(0)
2022	Kettering Town	2	(0)
2022	Macclesfield	1	(1)
2023	Cheshunt	0	(0)
2023	Vancouver FC	24	(0)
2024–2026	Cheltenham Town	31	(0)
2025–2026	→ Gateshead (loan)	7	(0)
2026–	Eastleigh	0	(0)
- * Club domestic league appearances and goals as of 18:08, 25 June 2026 (UTC)

Ibrahim Akorede Abayomi Bakare (born 7 May 2002) is an English footballer who plays as a centre-back for National League club Eastleigh.

== Early life ==
Bakare began playing youth football in his hometown of London with Mass Elite Academy. In the summer of 2018, he joined the youth system of Morecambe, following trials with Chelsea, Fleetwood Town, Blackpool and Luton Town.

== Club career ==
In July 2019, he signed a first team professional contract with Morecambe in the EFL League Two, after previously being part of the club's academy. He was given the contract after having attracted interest from a number of clubs such as Brentford, Watford, Leeds United and West Brom. In December 2019, he was loaned to Lancaster City in the Northern Premier League Premier Division. In October 2020, he departed Morecambe, with his contract being terminated but the club retaining a sell-on clause, after he had gone on numerous trials with other clubs (with Morecambe's permission).

In March 2021, he signed with Cardiff City, joining their Under-23 side on a contract until June 2022. He spent a year with the U23s, regularly captaining the side.

In September 2022, he joined Weymouth in the National League South. He made his debut on 13 September against Bath City. However, by 24 September, he had departed the club.

In October 2022, he signed with Kettering Town in the National League North. He made his debut for the club on 11 October in a Northamptonshire Senior Cup match against Daventry Town and then made his league debut on 15 October against Spennymoor Town.

On 2 December 2022, he signed with Macclesfield in the Northern Premier League Division One West. He scored on his debut on 3 December against Colne. On 15 December, he departed the club.

In January 2023, he signed with Cheshunt in the National League South. He made an appearance for the club in a friendly against Watford U21.

In March 2023, he signed with Canadian Premier League club Vancouver FC. On 7 May 2023 (his 21st birthday), he earned Man of the Match honours in Vancouver's first ever home match and was subsequently named to the CPL Team of the Week. After the season, he parted ways with the club to pursue other opportunities.

In August 2024, Bakare returned to England, joining League Two club Cheltenham Town following a successful trial period. In October 2025, he was loaned to National League club Gateshead until 9 January 2026. Shortly after returning from his loan spell at Gateshead, in February 2026 Bakare left Cheltenham Town.

In June 2026, Bakare joined National League club Eastleigh.
