= Nicky Gyimah =

Professional footballer (born 2003)

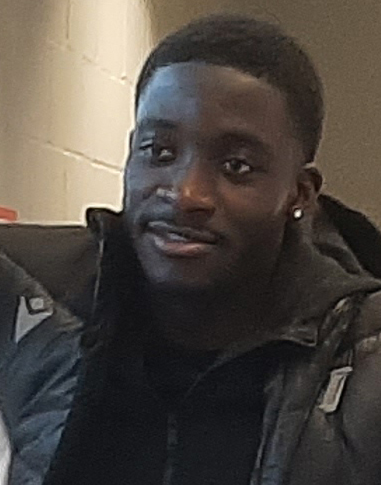
- Gyimah in 2023

Personal information
- Full name: Nicky William Adjei Gyimah-Bio
- Date of birth: 27 May 2003 (age 23)
- Place of birth: London, England
- Height: 1.73 m (5 ft 8 in)
- Position: Midfielder

Youth career
- Onside Academy
- 2018–2021: Peterborough United
- 2021–2022: Sunderland

Senior career*
Years	Team	Apps	(Gls)
2022	Broadfields United	8	(4)
2022–2023	Slough Town	0	(0)
2023	Vancouver FC	11	(0)

International career
- Ghana U17
- * Club domestic league appearances and goals as of 28 July 2023

Nicky William Adjei Gyimah-Bio (born 27 May 2003) is a professional footballer. Born in England, he has represented Ghana at youth level.

== Early life ==
Gyimah was a part of Onside Academy, which helped him earn a scholarship contract with Peterborough United at age 15 in 2018. In May 2020, it was reported that German club Wolfsburg were interested in signing Gyimah, along with eight other European clubs. In September 2021, he went on trial with Middlesbrough U23, playing in a Premier League Cup match with them.

In December 2021, he joined Sunderland U23 following a trial period, on a contract for the remainder of the season, with club option for another season. He scored on his Sunderland U23 debut on 10 January 2022 against Reading U23. In June 2022, he was released by Sunderland, who declined his option year, after making ten appearances for the U23s with one goal.

== Club career ==
In 2022, he joined Broadfields United in the Combined Counties Football League Premier Division North.

In December 2022, he joined Slough Town in the National League South, but did not make an appearance for the club.

In March 2023, he joined Canadian Premier League club Vancouver FC. After the season, the club declined his option for the 2024 season.

== International career ==
Born in England, Gyimah is eligible for Ghana through descent. He represented Ghana U17 team.
