= 2024 Atlético Ottawa season =

Atlético Ottawa 2024 soccer season

Atlético Ottawa
2024 season
- CEO: Fernando Lopez
- Head coach: Carlos González
- Stadium: TD Place Stadium
- Canadian Premier League: 3rd
- CPL Playoffs: Semi-Final
- Canadian Championship: Quarter Final
- Top goalscorer: League: Rubén Del Campo (11); All: Rubén Del Campo (14)
- Highest home attendance: 7,091 (September 22 vs. Pacific FC)
- Lowest home attendance: 1,977 (May 8 vs. Pacific FC)
- Average home league attendance: 5,485
- Biggest win: 7-0 vs. Valour FC (May 1)
- Biggest defeat: 4-1 @ York United (July 26)

The 2024 Atlético Ottawa season is the fifth season in the history of Atlético Ottawa. In addition to the Canadian Premier League, the club competed in the Canadian Championship. This is the club's third season under head coach Carlos González.

In the previous season, the club finished 6th in the Canadian Premier League, which resulted in the club missing the playoffs for the third time. They missed the playoffs by just two points.

== Current squad ==
As of August 29, 2024

No.	Name	Nationality	Position(s)	Date of birth (age)	Previous club	Notes
Goalkeepers
29	Nathan Ingham	(Canada)	GK	January 27, 1993 (aged 31)	(Canada) York United FC	
99	Rayane Yesli	(Algeria)	GK	October 12, 1999 (aged 25)	(Canada) Valour FC	
Defenders
2	Zachary Roy	(Canada)	RB	June 24, 2003 (aged 21)	(Canada) CS St. Hubert	U21
3	Jesús del Amo	(Spain)	CB	May 25, 1999 (aged 25)	(Spain) Real Avilés	INT
4	Tyr Walker	(Canada)	CB / FB	October 22, 2003 (aged 21)	(Canada) Acadia University	U21
5	Luke Singh	(Trinidad and Tobago)	CB	September 12, 2000 (aged 24)	(Canada) Toronto FC	Loan
6	Liberman Torres	(Ecuador)	CB / DM	May 16, 2002 (aged 22)	(Spain) Villarreal B	INT, Loan
8	Dani Morer	(Spain)	RB	February 5, 1998 (aged 26)	(Portugal) Famalicão	INT, Loan
15	Maxim Tissot	(Canada)	LB	April 13, 1992 (aged 32)	(Canada) Forge FC	
22	Matteo de Brienne	(Canada)	LB / LW	May 22, 2002 (aged 22)	(Canada) Valour FC	
55	Amer Didic	(Canada)	CB	December 28, 1994 (aged 30)	(Canada) Pacific FC	
	Jonathan Grant	(Guyana)	RB / CB	October 15, 1993 (aged 31)	(Canada) York United	IL
Midfielders
10	Ollie Bassett	(Northern Ireland)	AM / LW	March 6, 1998 (aged 26)	(Canada) Pacific FC	INT
11	Gabriel Antinoro	(Brazil)	LW	April 24, 2004 (aged 20)	(Canada) CF Montréal	U21
18	Luca Piccioli	(Canada)	CM	May 11, 1999 (aged 25)	(Canada) Carleton	USPORTS
21	Alberto Zapater	(Spain)	DM	June 13, 1985 (aged 39)	(Spain) Real Zaragoza	INT
23	Kris Twardek	(Canada)	RW	March 8, 1997 (aged 27)	(Republic of Ireland) Bohemians FC	
33	Aboubacar Sissoko	(Mali)	CM	October 9, 1995 (aged 29)	(Canada) Forge FC	
34	Manny Aparicio	(Canada)	CM	September 17, 1995 (aged 29)	(Canada) Pacific FC	
96	Ilias Iliadis	(Greece)	CM / LB	March 21, 2001 (aged 23)	(Canada) CF Montreal	Loan
Forwards
7	Kevin dos Santos	(Portugal)	LW / RW	November 20, 1999 (aged 25)	(Canada) York United	INT
9	Samuel Salter	(Canada)	CF	August 9, 2000 (aged 24)	(Canada) HFX Wanderers	
13	Ballou Tabla	(Canada)	CF / RW / LW	March 31, 1999 (aged 25)	(Turkey) Manisa FK	
19	Rubén Del Campo	(Switzerland)	CF / LW	February 23, 2000 (aged 24)	(Spain) San Fernando CD	INT

== Transfers ==
=== In ===
==== Transferred in ====
No.	Pos.	Player	From club	Fee/notes	Date	Source
	DF	(Canada) Matteo de Brienne	(Canada) Valour FC	Free	December 21, 2023	
	FW	(Canada) Ballou Tabla	(Turkey) Manisa FK	Free	January 22, 2024	
	MF	(Canada) Kris Twardek	(Republic of Ireland) Bohemians FC	Free	January 30, 2024	
	MF	(Mali) Aboubacar Sissoko	(Canada) Forge FC	Free	February 7, 2024	
	GK	(Algeria) Rayane Yesli	(Canada) Valour FC	Undisclosed	February 9, 2024	
	DF	(Guyana) Jonathan Grant	(Canada) York United	Free	February 9, 2024	
	FW	(Portugal) Kevin Dos Santos	(Canada) York United	Free	February 20, 2024	
34	MF	(Canada) Manny Aparicio	(Canada) Pacific FC	Free	March 22, 2024	
	DF	(Canada) Amer Didic	(Canada) Pacific FC	Free	April 5, 2024	
	MF	(Canada) Luca Piccioli	(Canada) Carleton University	Free	April 18, 2024	
	MF	(Canada) Luca Piccioli	(Canada) Carleton University	Free	August 3, 2024	
	DF	(Spain) Jesús del Amo	(Spain) Real Avilés	Free	August 29, 2024	

==== Loans in ====
No.	Pos.	Player	Loaned from	Fee/notes	Date	Source
	DF	(Ecuador) Liberman Torres	(Spain) Villarreal B		February 2, 2024	
	DF	(Trinidad and Tobago) Luke Singh	(Canada) Toronto FC		March 22, 2024	
	DF	(Spain) Dani Morer	(Portugal) Famalicão		April 30, 2024	
	MF	(Greece) Ilias Iliadis	(Canada) CF Montréal		August 8, 2024	

==== Draft picks ====
Atlético Ottawa will make the 3rd and 11th selections in the 2024 CPL–U Sports Draft. Draft picks are not automatically signed to the team roster. Only those who are signed to a contract will be listed as transfers in.

Round	Selection	Pos.	Player	Nationality	University
1	3	MF	Luca Piccioli	Canada	Carleton
2	11	DF	Samuel LaPlante	Canada	UQTR

=== Out ===
==== Transferred out ====
No.	Pos.	Player	To club	Fee/notes	Date	Source
9	FW	(Canada) Carl Haworth	Retired	Retired	November 21, 2023	
1	GK	(Canada) Sean Melvin	(Canada) Pacific FC	Released	November 21, 2023	
3	DF	(Cameroon) Macdonald Niba	(Canada) Thunder Bay Chill	Released	November 21, 2023	
7	FW	(Cape Verde) Gianni dos Santos	(India) Inter Kashi	Undisclosed	January 1, 2024	
4	DF	(Spain) Diego Espejo	(Spain) Atletico Madrid B	Loan Expired	January 1, 2024	
5	DF	(Canada) Luke Singh	(Canada) Toronto FC	Loan Expired	January 1, 2024	
14	MF	(Canada) Jean-Aniel Assi	(Canada) CF Montréal	Loan Expired	January 1, 2024	
96	MF	(Greece) Ilias Iliadis	(Canada) CF Montréal	Loan Expired	January 1, 2024	
17	DF	(Spain) Miguel Acosta	(Spain) La Nucía	Contract Expired	January 18, 2024	
16	MF	(Canada) Zach Verhoven	(Canada) Vancouver FC	Contract Expired	March 14, 2024	
20	DF	(Canada) Karl Ouimette	Retired	Retired	March 18, 2024	
19	FW	(Trinidad and Tobago) Malcolm Shaw	(Canada) Cavalry FC	Contract Expired	April 3, 2024	
91	DF	(France) Aboubakary Sacko		Mutual Termination	July 19, 2024	
	MF	(Canada) Luca Piccioli	(Canada) Ottawa South United	Mutual Termination	July 19, 2024	

==== Loans out ====
No.	Pos.	Player	Loaned to	Fee/notes	Date	Source
	MF	(Canada) Noah Verhoeven	(Canada) Valour FC		February 9, 2024	

== Pre-season friendlies ==
8 March 2024 Friendly	Atlético Ottawa	1–1	Carleton Ravens	Ottawa, Ontario
		Report

16 March 2024 Friendly	(Mexico) Querétaro F.C.	1–0	Atlético Ottawa	Querétaro, Mexico
10:00 CET		Report		Stadium: Estadio Corregidora

18 March 2024 Friendly	(Mexico) Atlético San Luis	1–1	Atlético Ottawa	San Luis Potosí, Mexico
12:00 CET		Report	de Brienne	Stadium: Estadio Alfonso Lastras

23 March 2024 Friendly	(Mexico) Atlético San Luis U23	0–2	Atlético Ottawa	San Luis Potosí, Mexico
1:00 CET		Report	Dos Santos; Del Campo	Stadium: Estadio Alfonso Lastras

27 March 2024 Friendly	(Mexico) Mineros de Zacatecas	1–0	Atlético Ottawa	Zacatecas, Mexico
11:30am CST		Report		Stadium: Estadio Carlos Vega Villalba

6 April 2024 Friendly	Atlético Ottawa	4–1	CS Saint-Laurent	Ottawa, Ontario
1:30pm EST	Didic; Salter; Bassett; Sissoko	Report		Stadium: TD Place Stadium

== Competitions ==
=== Canadian Premier League ===
==== Table ====
Pos	Team	Pld	W	D	L	GF	GA	GD	Pts	Playoff qualification
1	Forge (S)	28	15	5	8	45	31	+14	50	First semifinal
2	Cavalry (C)	28	12	12	4	39	27	+12	48	First semifinal
3	Atlético Ottawa	28	11	11	6	42	31	+11	44	Quarterfinal
4	York United	28	11	6	11	35	36	−1	39	Play-in round
5	Pacific	28	9	7	12	27	32	−5	34	Play-in round
6	HFX Wanderers	28	7	9	12	37	43	−6	30 (Note: Head-to-head points: HFX Wanderers 7, Vancouver 4)	
7	Vancouver	28	7	9	12	29	43	−14	30	
8	Valour	28	7	7	14	31	42	−11	28	

Source: CanPL
Rules for classification: 1) Points; 2) Total number of wins; 3) Head-to-head; 4) Goal differential; 5) Goals for; 6) Away goals differential; 7) Away goals for; 8) Home goals differential; 9) Home goals for; 10) Fewest disciplinary points; 11) Most under-21 domestic player minutes; 12) Drawing of lots.
(C) Champion (qualified to Champions Cup Round one); (S) CPL Shield winner (qualified to Champions Cup Round one)

==== Results by match ====
Match	1	2	3	4	5	6	7	8	9	10	11	12	13	14	15	16	17	18	19	20	21	22	23	24	25	26	27	28
Result	W	D	W	W	D	W	W	D	W	L	D	W	L	W	D	L	L	L	W	D	W	D	D	D	D	L	W	D
Position	2	4	2	1	1	1	1	1	1	1	1	1	1	1	1	1	1	3	2	2	2	2	2	2	2	3	3	3

Source: Matches
W = Win; D = Draw; L = Loss

==== Matches ====
April 13 1	Atlético Ottawa	2-1	York United	Ottawa, Ontario
1:00pm ET	Singh (yellow card) 43'; Aparicio 63' (yellow card) 90+4'; Twardek (yellow card) 77' (goal) 78'	Report	Abatneh (yellow card) 45'; Ricci 49' (yellow card) 77'; Botello (yellow card) 84'	Stadium: TD Place Stadium; Attendance: 4,049; Referee: Yusri Rudolf

April 20 2	Atlético Ottawa	1-1	Cavalry FC	Ottawa, Ontario
2:00pm ET	Zapater (yellow card) 4'; Twardek (yellow card) 37'; Didic 47' (yellow card) 81'; Del Campo (yellow card) 85'	Report	Twardek 90' (o.g.)	Stadium: TD Place Stadium; Attendance: 4,569; Referee: Mathieu Souaré

April 27 3	HFX Wanderers	1-3	Atlético Ottawa	Halifax, Nova Scotia
1:00pm ET	Callegari (red card) 19'; Gagnon-Laparé (yellow card) 78'; Ferrazzo 89'	Report	Twardek (yellow card) 31'; del Campo 39'; Aparicio 56'; Tabla (yellow card) 68', (goal) 73'	Stadium: Wanderers Grounds; Attendance: 6,500; Referee: Ben Hoskins

May 5 4	Atlético Ottawa	2-0	Valour FC	Ottawa, Ontario
2:00pm ET	Del Campo 19'; Antinoro 32'; Didic (yellow card) 49'; de Brienne (yellow card) 67'; Twardek (yellow card) 90+1'		Verhoeven (yellow card) 18'; Campbell (yellow card) 70'; Faria (yellow card) 90+3'	Stadium: TD Place Stadium; Attendance: 3,886; Referee: Mario Al-Ayass

May 12 5	Vancouver FC	1-1	Atlético Ottawa	Langley, British Columbia
7:00pm ET	Cantave (yellow card) 46'; Díaz 68'; Bah (yellow card) 73'; Verhoven (yellow card) 80'; Dyer (yellow card) 82'; Fry (yellow card) 90+3'		Aparicio (yellow card) 19'; Tabla (yellow card) 36'; Del Campo 56'; de Brienne (yellow card) 76'; Sissoko (yellow card) 90+6'	Stadium: Willoughby Community Park; Referee: Roberto D'Alessio

May 17 6	Pacific FC	0-1	Atlético Ottawa	Langford, British Columbia
10:00pm ET	Tîrcoveanu (yellow card) 29'; Heard (yellow card) 49'; Greco-Taylor (yellow card) 70'		Del Campo 32' (yellow card) 39'; Singh (yellow card) 45+4'; Yesli (yellow card) 47'	Stadium: Starlight Stadium; Attendance: 2,720; Referee: Michael Venne

May 25 7	Atlético Ottawa	3-0	Forge FC	Ottawa, Ontario
3:00pm ET	Aparicio 13'; Sissoko (yellow card) 15'; Zapater 72'; Del Campo 82'		Owolabi-Belewu (yellow card) 24'; Parra (yellow card) 25'; Hojabrpour (yellow card) 53'	Stadium: TD Place Stadium; Attendance: 5,895; Referee: Myriam Marcotte

June 2 8	Atlético Ottawa	2-2	HFX Wanderers	Ottawa, Ontario
2:00pm ET	Tabla (yellow card) 30'; Bassett 84'; de Brienne (yellow card) 90+2'; Zapater 90+11'; Roy (yellow card)		Ferrazzo 21'; Callegari (yellow card) 14'; Coimbra 75' (yellow card) 77' (yellow-red card) 86'; Fillion (yellow card) 81'; Timoteo (yellow card) 90+8'	Stadium: TD Place Stadium; Attendance: 5,244; Referee: Renzo Villanueva

June 9 9	Valour FC	0-2	Atlético Ottawa	Winnipeg, Manitoba
3:00pm ET	Ohin (yellow card) 55'; Verhoeven (yellow card) 57'; Alarcón (yellow card) 61'		de Brienne (yellow card) 13'; Bassett 59' (pen.); Salter 90+1'	Stadium: Princess Auto Stadium; Referee: Mathieu Souaré

June 15 10	Atlético Ottawa	1-2	York United	Ottawa, Ontario
1:00pm ET	Sissoko (yellow card) 50'; Didic 69'; Singh (yellow card) 90+1'		Wright 36' 49'; Botello (yellow card) 56'; Martin-Pereux (yellow card) 77'; Adekugbe (yellow card) 90+4'	Stadium: TD Place Stadium; Attendance: 5,640; Referee: Fabrizio Stasolla

June 21 11	Cavalry FC	1-1	Atlético Ottawa	Calgary, Alberta
9:00pm ET	Warschewski 2'; Gutierrez (yellow card) 64'; Daley (yellow card) 90'		Zapater 39'; Torres (yellow card) 90+4'	Stadium: ATCO Field; Referee: Ben Hoskins

June 28 12	Atlético Ottawa	4-3	Forge FC	Ottawa, Ontario
7:00pm ET	Sissoko 2' (yellow card) 81'; Ingham (yellow card) 57'; Didic 62'; Del Campo 70'; Aparicio (yellow card) 86'; Torres 90+3'; Yesli (yellow card) 90+4'		Samuel (yellow card) 41'; Singh 48' (o.g.); Achinioti-Jonsson 55'; Choiniere (yellow card) 64'; Poku 88'	Stadium: TD Place Stadium; Attendance: 5,081; Referee: Michael Venne

July 7 13	Atlético Ottawa	0-1	Pacific FC	Ottawa, Ontario
2:00pm ET	Del Campo (yellow card) 90+3'		Lajeunesse (yellow card) 26'; Bahous 45+3'; Greco-Taylor (yellow card) 85'; Quintana (yellow card) 90+4'	Stadium: TD Place Stadium; Attendance: 5,794; Referee: Mario Alayass

July 12 14	Vancouver FC	0-3	Atlético Ottawa	Langley, British Columbia
10:00pm ET	Norman Jr. (yellow card) 54'		Del Campo (yellow card) 12' (goal) 69'; Aparicio (yellow card) 26'; de Brienne (yellow card) 48'; Tabla 57'; Walker (yellow card) 85'; Salter 90+1'	Stadium: Willoughby Community Park; Referee: Scott Bowman

July 21 15	Atlético Ottawa	2-2	Valour FC	Ottawa, Ontario
2:00pm ET	Antonoglou 1' (o.g.); Aparicio (yellow card) 32'; Tabla (yellow card) 55'; Del Campo 73'; Bassett (yellow card) 80'		Mlah (26); Antonoglou (yellow card) 45'; Facchineri (67); Ohin (yellow card) 80'	Stadium: TD Place Stadium; Attendance: 5,527; Referee: Carly Shaw-Maclaren

July 26 16	York United	4-1	Atlético Ottawa	Toronto, Ontario
7:00pm ET	Adekugbe (yellow card) 12' (goal) 41'; Córdova 51'; Babouli 78'; León (yellow card) 82'; Wright 89'		Bassett 6' (yellow card) 82'; Singh (yellow card) 38'; Twardek (yellow card) 54'; Zapater (yellow card) 56'; Aparicio (yellow card) 82'; Morer (yellow card) 90+1'	Stadium: York Lions Stadium; Attendance: 2,019; Referee: Renzo Villanueva

August 3 17	Atlético Ottawa	1-2	Cavalry FC	Ottawa, Ontario
7:00pm ET	Salter 87'		Camargo (yellow card) 33'; Musse 72' 89'; Shome (yellow card) 76'; Aird (yellow card) 84'	Stadium: TD Place Stadium; Attendance: 5,711; Referee: Ben Hoskins

August 10 18	Forge FC	3-0	Atlético Ottawa	Hamilton, Ontario
7:00pm ET	Borges 21' 39'; Bekker (yellow card) 72'; Cissé 86'; Kalongo (yellow card) 90+1'		de Brienne (yellow card) 42'	Stadium: Tim Hortons Field; Referee: Scott Bowman

August 17 19	Pacific FC	0-3	Atlético Ottawa	Langford, British Columbia
6:00pm ET	Tircoveanu (yellow card) 28'; Mukumbilwa (yellow card) 64'		Sissoko 2'; Iliadis 15'; Del Campo 22'; Morer (yellow card) 40'; Didic (yellow card) 42'; Tabla (yellow card) 90+4'	Stadium: Starlight Stadium; Referee: Carly Shaw-Maclaren

August 24 20	HFX Wanderers	1-1	Atlético Ottawa	Halifax, Nova Scotia
2:00pm ET	Fillion (yellow card) 39'; Nimick 90+6' (pen.)		Aparicio (yellow card) 33'; de Brienne (yellow card) 47'; Didic (yellow card) 61'; Del Campo (yellow card) 81'; Zapater (yellow card) 84'; Salter 90+2'	Stadium: Wanderers Grounds; Referee: Robert D'Alesio

August 31 21	Atlético Ottawa	1-0	Vancouver FC	Ottawa, Ontario
7:00pm ET	Iliadis 2'; de Brienne (yellow card) 45+3'		Garcia (yellow card) 64'	Stadium: TD Place Stadium; Attendance: 7,022; Referee: Mathieu Souaré

September 9 22	Valour FC	1-1	Atlético Ottawa	Winnipeg, Manitoba
8:00pm ET	Hundal 10'; Mourdoukoutas (yellow card) 52'; Campbell (yellow card) 72'; Viscosi (yellow card) 76'		Morer (yellow card) 35'; Antinoro (yellow card) 45+2'; Del Campo 77' (pen.)	Stadium: Princess Auto Stadium; Referee: Ben Hoskins

September 15 23	Cavalry FC	2-2	Atlético Ottawa	Calgary, Alberta
5:00pm ET	Klomp (yellow card) 8' (goal) 66'; Musse 16'; Kamdem (yellow card) 55'; Gutiérrez (yellow card) 74'		Aparicio 5'; Del Campo 48'; Didic (yellow card) 55'; Iliadis (yellow card) 65'	Stadium: ATCO Field; Attendance: 4,567; Referee: Myriam Marcotte

September 22 24	Atlético Ottawa	1-1	Pacific FC	Ottawa, Ontario
2:00pm ET	Sissoko 29' (yellow card) 30'; Morer (yellow card) 39'		Dominguez (yellow card) 37'; Dyer 53' (yellow card) 54'; Reid (yellow card) 90+6'	Stadium: TD Place Stadium; Attendance: 7,091

September 29 25	Atlético Ottawa	1-1	HFX Wanderers	Ottawa, Ontario
2:00pm ET	Didic 4'; Ingham (yellow card) 79'; Del Amo (yellow card) 90+2'		Mekideche 79'; Alphonse (yellow card) 89'	Stadium: TD Place Stadium; Attendance: 5,662; Referee: Roberto D'Alessio

October 6 26	York United	1-0	Atlético Ottawa	Toronto, Ontario
5:00pm ET	Botello (yellow card) 4'; Higgins (yellow card) 68'; Jimoh 69'; Baldisimo (yellow card) 88'		Liberman Torres (red card) 25'; Iliadis (yellow card) 90+3'	Stadium: York Lions Stadium; Referee: Yusri Rudolf

October 12 27	Forge FC	0-2	Atlético Ottawa	Hamilton, Ontario
4:00pm ET	Hojabrpour (yellow card) 38' (yellow-red card) 69'; Parra (yellow card) 41'; Ampomah (yellow card) 73'		Aparicio 14'; Salter 36'; Singh (yellow card) 43'; de Brienne (yellow card) 54'	Stadium: Tim Hortons Field; Referee: Marie-Soleil Beaudoin

October 19 28	Atlético Ottawa	0-0	Vancouver FC	Ottawa, Ontario
	Sissoko (yellow card) 18'; Aparicio (yellow card) 45+1'; de Brienne (yellow card) 69'; Bassett (yellow card) 83'; del Amo (yellow card) 85'; Iliadis (yellow card) 90+5'		Cantave (yellow card) 25'	Stadium: TD Place Stadium; Attendance: 5,613; Referee: Renzo Villanueva

==== Playoff matches ====
October 27 QF	Atlético Ottawa	2-2 (5-4 p)	York United	Ottawa, Ontario
1:00pm ET	Morer (yellow card) 29'; Bassett 47' (yellow card) 90'; Salter (yellow card) 90+2'; Del Campo 92' (pen.)	Report	Higgins (yellow card) 74'; Jimoh 90+4'; Adekugbe (yellow card) 91'; Babouli 94'; Botello (yellow card) 109'	Stadium: TD Place Stadium; Attendance: 4,630; Referee: Marie-Soleil Beaudoin
	Penalties
	Didic (penalty scored); Tissot (penalty scored); Del Campo (penalty scored); Zapater (penalty scored); Iliadis (penalty scored)		(penalty scored) Córdova; (penalty missed) Babouli; (penalty scored) Wright; (penalty scored) Botello; (penalty scored) Martínez

November 2 SF	Forge FC	1-0	Atlético Ottawa	Hamilton, Ontario
4:00pm ET	Owolabi-Belewu 53' (yellow card) 80'; Ampomah (yellow card) 70'; Badibanga (yellow card) 82'; Koleilat (yellow card) 90+5'	Report	Aparicio (yellow card) 78'	Stadium: Hamilton Stadium; Attendance: 6,315; Referee: Michael Venne

=== Canadian Championship ===
May 1, 2024 1	Atlético Ottawa	7-0	Valour FC	Ottawa, Ontario
7:00 PM EDT	Bassett (14) (64); Zapater (30) (37); del Campo (31) (69); Didic (yellow card) 42'; Tabla (63)		Binate (yellow card) 26'; Campbell (yellow card) 36'; Chantzopoulos (yellow card) 39'	Stadium: TD Place Stadium; Attendance: 2,492; Referee: Scott Bowman

May 8, 2024 QF	Atlético Ottawa	0-0	Pacific FC	Ottawa, Ontario
7:00 PM EDT	de Brienne (yellow card) 33'; Bassett (yellow card) 62'		Dada-Luke (yellow card) 90+8'	Stadium: TD Place Stadium; Attendance: 1,977; Referee: Marie-Soleil Beaudoin

May 29, 2024 QF	Pacific FC	2-1	Atlético Ottawa	Langford, British Columbia
10:00 PM EDT	Sellouf (28); Heard (34); Lajeunesse (yellow card) 67'; Moore (yellow card) 89'		Didic (yellow card) 26'; Salter (60) (yellow card) 90+2'; Bassett (yellow card) 69'; Sissoko (yellow card) 87'; Antinoro (yellow card) 90+8'	Stadium: Starlight Stadium; Referee: Pierre-Luc Lauziere

== Statistics ==
=== Squad and statistics ===
As of November 2, 2024

No.	Pos	Nat	Player	Total		Canadian Premier League		Canadian Championship	
No.	Pos	Nat	Player	Apps	Goals	Apps	Goals	Apps	Goals
2	DF	(Canada) CAN	Zachary Roy	8	0	2+6	0	0+0	0
3	DF	(Spain) ESP	Jesús del Amo	7	0	6+1	0	0+0	0
4	DF	(Canada) CAN	Tyr Walker	19	0	16+2	0	0+1	0
5	DF	(Trinidad and Tobago) TTO	Luke Singh	22	0	16+3	0	3+0	0
6	DF	(Ecuador) ECU	Liberman Torres	16	1	6+10	1	0+0	0
7	FW	(Portugal) POR	Kevin dos Santos	10	0	1+9	0	0+0	0
8	DF	(Spain) ESP	Dani Morer	30	0	14+13	0	1+2	0
9	FW	(Canada) CAN	Samuel Salter	33	6	8+22	5	1+2	1
10	MF	(Northern Ireland) NIR	Ollie Bassett	32	6	25+4	4	3+0	2
11	MF	(Brazil) BRA	Gabriel Antinoro	22	1	10+9	1	0+3	0
13	FW	(Canada) CAN	Ballou Tabla	33	3	24+6	2	2+1	1
15	DF	(Canada) CAN	Maxim Tissot	15	0	2+10	0	3+0	0
19	FW	(Switzerland) SUI	Rubén Del Campo	33	14	24+6	12	2+1	2
21	MF	(Spain) ESP	Alberto Zapater	27	5	15+9	3	2+1	2
22	DF	(Canada) CAN	Matteo de Brienne	31	0	28+0	0	3+0	0
23	MF	(Canada) CAN	Kris Twardek	26	1	17+6	1	3+0	0
29	GK	(Canada) CAN	Nathan Ingham	22	0	22+0	0	0+0	0
33	MF	(Mali) MLI	Aboubacar Sissoko	33	2	25+5	2	1+2	0
34	MF	(Canada) CAN	Manny Aparicio	32	5	28+1	5	3+0	0
55	DF	(Canada) CAN	Amer Didic	32	4	29+0	4	3+0	0
91	DF	(France) FRA	Aboubakary Sacko	2	0	0+1	0	0+1	0
96	DF	(Greece) GRE	Ilias Iliadis	11	2	6+5	2	0+0	0
99	GK	(Algeria) ALG	Rayane Yesli	10	0	7+0	0	3+0	0

=== Top scorers ===
Rank	Nat.	Player	Pos.	Canadian Premier League	Canadian Championship	Total
1	(Switzerland)	Rubén del Campo	ST	12	2	14
2	(Canada)	Samuel Salter	FW	5	1	6
2	(Northern Ireland)	Ollie Bassett	MF	4	2	6
4	(Spain)	Alberto Zapater	MF	3	2	5
4	(Canada)	Manny Aparicio	MF	5	0	5
6	(Canada)	Amer Didic	DF	4	0	4
7	(Canada)	Ballou Tabla	FW	2	1	3
7	(Mali)	Aboubacar Sissoko	MF	3	0	3
9	(Greece)	Ilias Iliadis	MF	2	0	2
10	(Canada)	Kris Twardek	DF	1	0	1
10	(Brazil)	Gabriel Antinoro	MF	1	0	1
10	(Ecuador)	Liberman Torres	DF	1	0	1
Totals				44	8	52

Updated to match played October 27, 2024
Source: Premier League

=== Top assists ===
Rank	Nat.	Player	Pos.	Canadian Premier League	Canadian Championship	Total
1	(Spain)	Dani Morer	DF	6	1	7
2	(Canada)	Ballou Tabla	FW	4	1	5
2	(Northern Ireland)	Ollie Bassett	MF	4	0	4
4	(Brazil)	Gabriel Antinoro	MF	2	1	3
4	(Canada)	Manny Aparicio	MF	2	1	3
6	(Canada)	Matteo de Brienne	DF	1	1	2
6	(Canada)	Kris Twardek	DF	2	0	2
6	(Canada)	Maxim Tissot	DF	1	1	2
6	(Mali)	Aboubacar Sissoko	MF	2	0	2
6	(Canada)	Samuel Salter	FW	2	0	2
6	(Switzerland)	Ruben Del Campo	FW	2	0	2
12	(Canada)	Amer Didic	DF	0	1	1
Totals				28	7	35

Updated to match played October 12, 2024
Source: Premier League

=== Clean sheets ===
Rank	Nat.	Player	Canadian Premier League	Canadian Championship	TOTAL
1	(Canada)	Nathan Ingham	7	0	7
2	(Algeria)	Rayane Yesli	2	2	4
Totals			9	2	11

Updated to match played October 19, 2024
Source: Premier League

=== Disciplinary record ===
No.	Pos.	Nat.	Player	Canadian Premier League		Canadian Championship		TOTAL	
No.	Pos.	Nat.	Player	Booked	Sent off (straight red)	Booked	Sent off (straight red)	Booked	Sent off (straight red)
2	DF	(Canada)	Zachary Roy	1	0	0	0	1	0
3	DF	(Spain)	Jesús del Amo	2	0	0	0	2	0
4	DF	(Canada)	Tyr Walker	1	0	0	0	1	0
5	DF	(Trinidad and Tobago)	Luke Singh	5	0	0	0	5	0
6	MF	(Ecuador)	Liberman Torres	1	1	0	0	1	1
8	DF	(Spain)	Dani Morer	5	0	0	0	5	0
9	FW	(Canada)	Samuel Salter	1	0	1	0	2	0
10	MF	(Northern Ireland)	Ollie Bassett	3	0	2	0	5	0
11	MF	(Brazil)	Gabriel Antinoro	1	0	1	0	2	0
13	FW	(Canada)	Ballou Tabla	5	0	0	0	5	0
19	FW	(Switzerland)	Ruben Del Campo	6	0	0	0	6	0
21	MF	(Spain)	Alberto Zapater	3	0	0	0	3	0
22	DF	(Canada)	Matteo de Brienne	9	0	1	0	10	0
23	MF	(Canada)	Kris Twardek	5	0	0	0	5	0
29	GK	(Canada)	Nathan Ingham	2	0	0	0	2	0
33	MF	(Mali)	Aboubacar Sissoko	6	0	1	0	7	0
34	MF	(Canada)	Manny Aparicio	9	0	0	0	9	0
55	DF	(Canada)	Amer Didic	5	0	2	0	7	0
96	DF	(Greece)	Ilias Iliadis	3	0	0	0	3	0
99	GK	(Algeria)	Rayane Yesli	2	0	0	0	2	0
Totals				74	1	8	0	82	1
