= List of foreign Canadian Premier League players =

List of Canadian EPL players

This is a list of foreign players (Note: The Canadian Premier League also uses the term international players.) in the Canadian Premier League (CPL), which commenced play in 2019. The following players:

1. Have played at least one CPL regular season game. Players who were signed by CPL clubs, but only played in playoff games, Canadian Championship games, or did not play in any competitive games at all, are not included.
2. Are considered foreign, i.e., outside Canada determined by the following:

A player is considered foreign if his allegiance is not to play for the national team of Canada.

More specifically,

- If a player has been capped at international level, the national team is used; if he has been capped by more than one country, the highest level (or the most recent) team is used. These include Canadian players with dual citizenship.
- If a player has not been capped at international level, his country of birth is used, except for those who are clearly indicated to have switched to another nation (e.g. Matthew Baldisimo).

This is a list of players currently occupying one of the seven roster spots designated for foreign players. Canadian Premier League teams may sign a maximum of seven international players, out of which only five can be in the starting lineup for each match. The following players are considered foreign players for the 2024 season. Some players are considered to be domestic, though they do not represent Canada, (e.g. Osaze De Rosario) through reasons like holding Canadian citizenship, being a refugee, or being a permanent resident.

Club	Player 1	Player 2	Player 3	Player 4	Player 5	Player 6	Player 7
Atlético Ottawa	(France) Aboubakary Sacko	(Northern Ireland) Ollie Bassett	(Spain) Alberto Zapater	(Switzerland) Rubén del Campo	(Ecuador) Liberman Torres	(Portugal) Kévin dos Santos	
Cavalry FC	(Netherlands) Daan Klomp	(Australia) Jesse Daley	(Australia) Lleyton Brooks	(Germany) Tobias Warschewski	(England) Jack Barrett	(Republic of Ireland) Tom Field	
Forge FC	(England) Malik Owolabi-Belewu	(Belgium) Béni Badibanga	(Sweden) Alexander Achinioti-Jönsson	(Senegal) Elimane Cissé	(Ghana) Opoku Ampomah	(Mexico) Daniel Parra	
HFX Wanderers	(France) Lorenzo Callegari	(Trinidad and Tobago) Andre Rampersad	(Brazil) Vitor Dias	(United States) Christian Volesky	(Italy) Giorgio Probo		
Inter Toronto	(Mexico) Oswaldo León	(Liberia) **Brem Soumaoro**	(Liechtenstein) Dennis Salanović	(Mexico) Orlando Botello	(Mexico) Josué Martínez	(France) Thomas Vincensini	
Pacific FC	(Netherlands) Ayman Sellouf	(France) Aly Ndom	(Trinidad and Tobago) Reon Moore	(Romania) Andrei Tîrcoveanu	(Republic of Ireland) Lukas Browning Lagerfeldt		
FC Supra du Québec							
Valour FC	(Spain) Roberto Alarcón	(Germany) Charalampos Chantzopoulos	(Australia) Tass Mourdoukoutas	(Australia) Jordan Swibel	(England) Kian Williams	(Portugal) Diogo Ressurreição	
Vancouver FC	(Brazil) Renan Garcia	(Mexico) Alejandro Díaz	(Mexico) José Navarro	(New Zealand) Moses Dyer			

If not stated otherwise, the country the player is under is the country they were born in.

In bold (for this section): players who have played at least one CPL game in the current season (2024 Canadian Premier League season).

== Africa (CAF) ==
=== Algeria ===
- Mohamed Farsi – Cavalry FC – 2020–21
- Chakib Hocine – HFX Wanderers, Valour FC – 2019–20
- Mastanabal Kacher – Valour FC, FC Edmonton – 2020–22
- Rayane Yesli – Valour FC – 2022–23

=== Burundi ===
- Pacifique Niyongabire – Valour FC – 2023

=== Benin ===
- Goteh Ntignee – Cavalry FC – 2022–23

=== Cameroon ===
- Jeannot Esua – FC Edmonton – 2019–21
- Bertrand Owundi – Forge FC – 2019
- Macdonald Niba – Atlético Ottawa – 2022–
- Tony Tchani – FC Edmonton – 2019
- **Wesley Wandje** – **Valour FC** – 2025–

=== Cape Verde ===
- Gianni dos Santos – Pacific FC, Atlético Ottawa – 2021–23

=== Congo (Republic of the Congo) ===
- **Jason Bahamboula** – HFX Wanderers – 2025–
- Arnold Bouka Moutou – Valour FC – 2020–22
- Dominique Malonga – Cavalry FC – 2019

=== DR Congo (Democratic Republic of the Congo) ===
- Sharly Mabussi – FC Edmonton – 2020
- Ousman Maheshe – FC Edmonton – 2022

=== Gambia (The Gambia) ===
- Kekuta Manneh – Pacific FC – 2023

=== Ghana ===
- **Nana Opoku Ampomah** – **Forge FC** – 2024–
- Nicky Gyimah – Vancouver FC – 2023
- Solomon Kojo Antwi – Valour FC – 2020
- Edem Mortotsi – FC Edmonton – 2019–20
- **Raphael Ohin** – **Valour FC** – 2019–

=== Guinea ===
- Mamadi Camara – HFX Wanderers, FC Edmonton – 2021–22
- Mohamed Kourouma – HFX Wanderers, Atlético Ottawa – 2019–20
- Ibrahima Sanoh – HFX Wanderers – 2020

=== Ivory Coast ===
- Abdul Binate – Valour FC – 2024
- Kouamé Ouattara – HFX Wanderers – 2019

=== Liberia ===
- David Doe – FC Edmonton – 2019–20
- T-Boy Fayia – FC Edmonton – 2021–22
- **Brem Soumaoro** – **York United** – 2023–

=== Mali ===
- **Abdou Samaké** – Pacific FC, **Valour FC** – 2020–
- **Aboubacar Sissoko** – HFX Wanderers, Forge FC, **Atlético Ottawa** – 2020, 2022–

=== Morocco ===
- Omar Kreim – HFX Wanderers – 2020–21

=== Nigeria ===
- Udoka Chima – Cavalry FC – 2023
- Kosi Nwafornso – HFX Wanderers – 2023
- Muslim Umar – York United – 2021

=== Senegal ===
- Elimane Cissé – Forge FC – 2019–21
- **Ndiaye Pathé** – **Vancouver FC** – 2025–
- Mour Samb – HFX Wanderers – 2020

=== Somalia ===
- Mohamed Omar – HFX Wanderers – 2022–23
- Abd-El-Aziz Yousef – HFX Wanderers – 2019
- **Ali Musse** – **Cavalry FC** – 2021–

=== South Sudan ===
- **William Akio** – Valour FC, **Cavalry FC** – 2021–22, 2024–

=== Tunisia ===
- **Mehdi Essoussi** – **Vancouver FC** – 2025–
- Eskander Mzoughi – Valour FC – 2023

=== Zimbabwe ===
- Darlington Murasiranwa – FC Edmonton – 2021–22

== Asia (AFC) ==
=== Afghanistan ===
- Adam Najem – FC Edmonton – 2021

=== Australia ===
- **Lleyton Brooks** – **Cavalry FC** – 2024–
- **Jesse Daley** – **Cavalry FC** – 2023–
- Luis Lawrie-Lattanzio – York United – 2022
- Tass Mourdoukoutas – York United – 2022–23
- **Jordan Swibel** – **Valour FC** – 2024–

=== Chinese Taipei ===
- Emilio Estevez – York9 – 2019–20

=== Iran ===
- Nima Moazeni Zadeh – Vancouver FC – 2023

=== Iraq ===
- Ameer Kinani – Vancouver FC – 2023

=== Japan ===
- Kodai Iida – HFX Wanderers – 2019
- Wataru Murofushi – York9 – 2019–20
- Fugo Segawa – York9 – 2020

=== Jordan ===
- Jaime Siaj – Valour FC – 2023

=== Lebanon ===
- **Gabriel Bitar** – Cavalry FC, FC Edmonton, **Vancouver FC** – 2019, 2022–
- Tony Mikhael – Valour FC – 2021–22

=== Saudi Arabia ===
- Ahmed Al-Ghamdi – Pacific FC – 2019

=== South Korea ===
- Min-jae Kwak – Vancouver FC – 2023
- Son Yong-chan – FC Edmonton – 2019–20

=== Philippines ===
- **Matthew Baldisimo** – Pacific FC, **York United** – 2019–

=== Syria ===
- **Molham Babouli** – Forge FC, **York United** – 2020–21, 2023–

== Europe (UEFA) ==
=== Albania ===
- Rezart Rama – Forge FC – 2022–23

=== Belgium ===
- **Béni Badibanga** – **Forge FC** – 2023–
- Oumar Diouck – FC Edmonton – 2019
- Mathias Janssens – Valour FC – 2019
- **VIictor Klonaridis** – **Forge FC** – 2024–
- **Olivier Rommens** –**Vancouver FC** – 2024–
- Paolo Sabak – Forge FC – 2020–21

=== Croatia ===
- Josip Golubar – Valour FC – 2019

=== Czech Republic ===
- Martin Graiciar – York United – 2022
- **Jassem Koleilat** – **Forge FC** – 2024–

=== Denmark ===
- **Ludwig Kodjo Amla** – **HFX Wanderers** – 2022–
- Daniel Obbekjær – York United – 2022

=== England ===
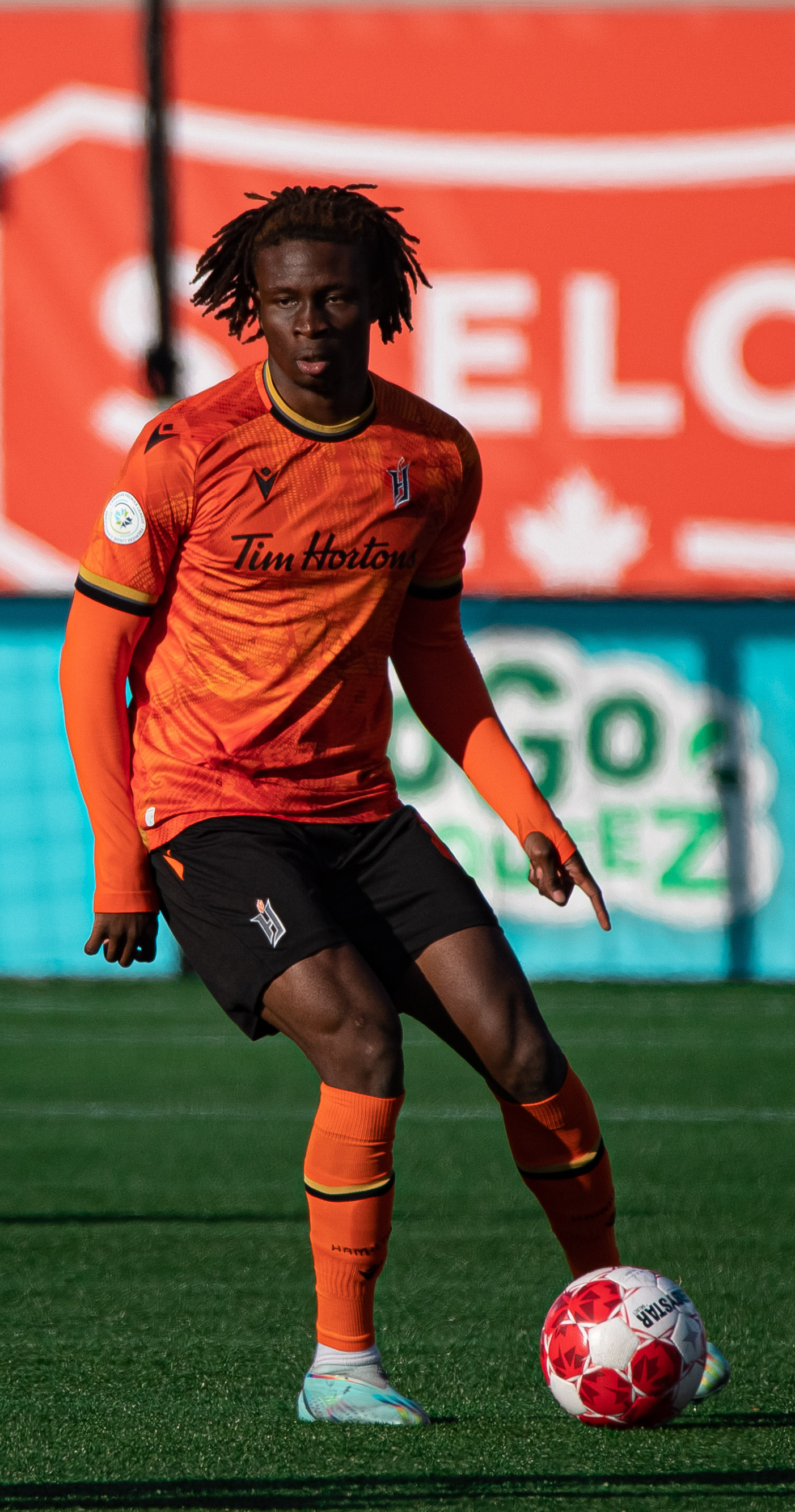
Malik Owolabi-Belewu has won two Canadian Premier League titles with Forge FC

- **Elijah Adekugbe** – Cavalry FC, **York United** – 2019–
- Tomi Ameobi – FC Edmonton – 2019–20
- **Ibrahim Bakare** – **Vancouver FC** – 2023–
- Jack Barrett – Cavalry FC – 2024
- **Ethan Beckford** – **Cavalry FC** – 2023–
- Cory Bent – HFX Wanderers – 2020–2022
- Jordan Brown – Pacific FC – 2022
- Stephen Hoyle – Valour FC – 2019
- Nathan Mavila – Cavalry FC, Pacific FC – 2019–20, 2022
- Adam Mitter – Valour FC – 2019
- Lifumpa Mwandwe – HFX Wanderers – 2022–23
- Vashon Neufville – Atlético Ottawa – 2020–21
- **Malik Owolabi-Belewu** – **Forge FC** – 2022–
- **Elliot Simmons** – Cavalry FC, **Vancouver FC** – 2020–
- Callum Watson – HFX Wanderers – 2023
- Jay Wheeldon – Cavalry FC – 2019–20
- **Kian Williams** – **Valour FC** – 2023–

=== Estonia ===
- Andreas Vaikla – FC Edmonton – 2022

=== France ===
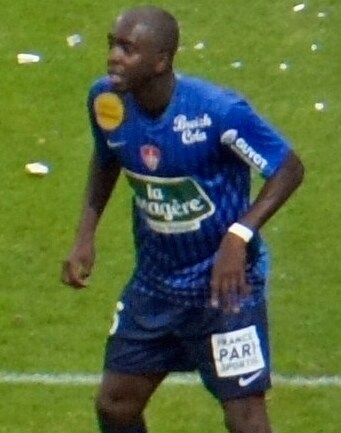
Abdoulwhaid Sissoko made team of the week twice whilst at Atlético Ottawa

- **Yohan Baï** – **HFX Wanderers** – 2025–
- André Bona – HFX Wanderers – 2019
- **Lorenzo Callegari** – **HFX Wanderers** – 2023–
- Théo Collomb – HFX Wanderers – 2023
- **Bradley Kamdem** – **Cavalry FC** – 2023–
- **Aly Ndom** – **Pacific FC** – 2024–
- Guillaume Pianelli – Valour FC – 2023
- Emmanuel Robe – Vancouver FC – 2023
- **Aboubakary Sacko** – **Atlético Ottawa** – 2023–
- Abdoul Sissoko – Atlético Ottawa – 2022
- **Thomas Vincensini** – **York United** – 2024–
- Allan Zebie – FC Edmonton – 2019–21

=== Germany ===
- **Charalampos Chantzopoulos** – **Valour FC** – 2024–
- Julian Engels – Cavalry FC – 2019
- Julian Roloff – Cavalry FC – 2022
- Peter Schaale – HFX Wanderers – 2019–22
- Hendrik Starostzik – Pacific FC – 2019
- Mélé Temguia – FC Edmonton – 2019–21
- Julian Ulbricht – York9/York United, FC Edmonton – 2020–22
- **Nicolas Wähling** – **Cavalry FC** – 2024–
- **Tobias Warschewski** – FC Edmonton, York United, FC Edmonton (2), **Cavalry FC** – 2021–22, 2024–

=== Greece ===
- Ilias Iliadis – Atlético Ottawa – 2023

=== Ireland (Republic of Ireland) ===
- **Tom Field** – **Cavalry FC** – 2021–22, 2023–
- Joe Mason – Cavalry FC – 2021–23
- **Lukas Browning Lagerfeldt** – **Pacific FC** – 2025–

=== Italy ===
- Michele Paolucci – Valour FC – 2019

=== Netherlands ===
- Oussama Alou – York United – 2023
- Djenairo Daniels – Pacific FC – 2022–23
- Lassana Faye – York United – 2023
- **Daan Klomp** – **Cavalry FC** – 2021–
- Daniël Krutzen – Forge FC – 2019–22
- **Ayman Sellouf** – **Pacific FC** – 2023–
- **Bradley Vliet** – Cavalry FC, **Pacific FC** – 2022–

=== Northern Ireland ===
- **Ollie Bassett** – Pacific FC, **Atlético Ottawa** – 2021–
- Daryl Fordyce – Valour FC – 2020–2022
- Ryan McCurdy – Pacific FC – 2019

=== Portugal ===
- Umaro Baldé – Pacific FC – 2022
- David Brazão – Pacific FC – 2023
- José da Cunha – Atlético Ottawa – 2022
- **Kévin Santos** – York United, **Atlético Ottawa** – 2022–

=== Romania ===
- Andrei Tîrcoveanu – Pacific FC – 2024

=== Serbia ===
- Teodor Obadal – Atlético Ottawa – 2021

=== Spain ===
- Miguel Acosta – Atlético Ottawa – 2021–23
- Roberto Alarcón – Cavalry FC – 2022–23
- Víctor Blasco – Pacific FC – 2019–21
- Sergio Camus – Atlético Ottawa – 2022
- Diego Espejo – Atlético Ottawa – 2022–23
- José Galán – Valour FC – 2019–21
- Viti Martínez – Atlético Ottawa – 2020–21
- Iván Pérez – Atlético Ottawa – 2022
- Álvaro Rivero – York9/York United – 2020–21
- Ramón Soria – FC Edmonton – 2019–21
- Alberto Soto – Atlético Ottawa – 2021
- Raúl Uche – Atlético Ottawa – 2021
- Nacho Zabal – Atlético Ottawa – 2020
- **Alberto Zapater** – **Atlético Ottawa** – 2023–

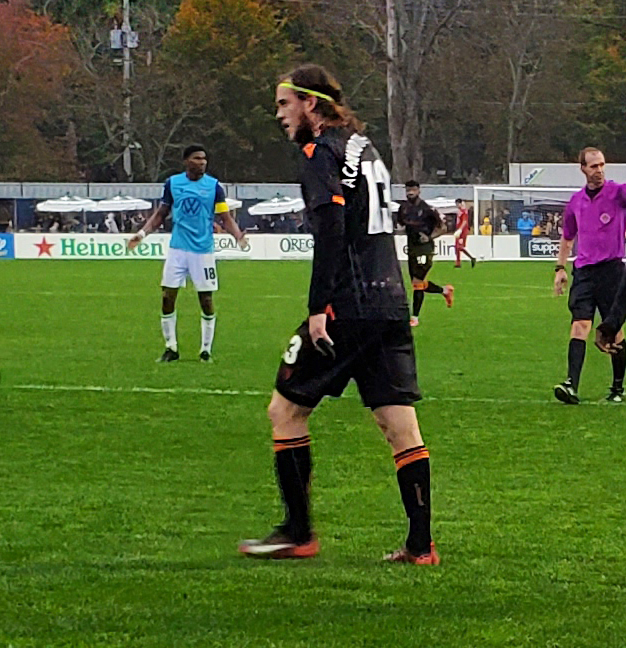
Alexander Achinioti-Jönsson has the most Canadian Premier League appearances of all time

=== Sweden ===
- **Alexander Achinioti-Jönsson** – **Forge FC** – 2019–
- Simon Adjei – York9 – 2019
- Erik Zetterberg – FC Edmonton – 2020

=== Switzerland ===
- **Rubén del Campo** – **Atlético Ottawa** – 2023–

=== Ukraine ===
- **Markiyan Voytsekhovskyy** – **York United** – 2023–

=== Wales ===
- **Josh Heard** – **Pacific FC** – 2020–

== North, Central America and Caribbean (CONCACAF) ==
=== Belize ===
- Eugene Martinez – Vancouver FC – 2023

=== Costa Rica ===
- Joshua Navarro – Forge FC – 2021

=== Cuba ===
- Andy Baquero – Valour FC – 2021–23
- Orlendis Benítez – Forge FC – 2022
- Alejandro Portal – HFX Wanderers – 2021

=== Dominican Republic ===
- Gerard Lavergne – York United – 2021
- Rafael Núñez – Atlético Ottawa – 2021

=== El Salvador ===
- Gabriel Escobar – HFX Wanderers – 2022
- Marcus Velado-Tsegaye – FC Edmonton – 2019–21

=== Guatemala ===
- Marco Domínguez – Pacific FC – 2024

=== Guyana ===
- **Osaze De Rosario** – **York United** – 2022–
- Javier George – York United – 2021
- Jonathan Grant – Forge FC, York United – 2019–23
- Terique Mohammed – FC Edmonton, York United, FC Edmonton (2) – 2020, 2021, 2022
- Quillian Roberts – Forge FC – 2019
- Marcus Simmons – Vancouver FC – 2023 –
- Emery Welshman – Forge FC – 2021–22

=== Haiti ===
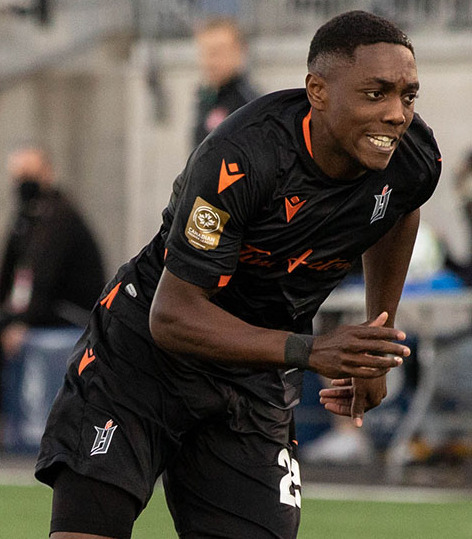
Garven Metusala won the 2022 CPL with Forge FC.

- Bicou Bissanthe – FC Edmonton – 2022
- **Mikaël Cantave** – **Cavalry FC** – 2022–
- Jems Geffrard – HFX Wanderers – 2020–21
- Andrew Jean-Baptiste – Valour FC – 2020–23
- James Marcelin – FC Edmonton – 2019
- **Garven Metusala** – **Forge FC** – 2021–
- **Cédric Toussaint** – **Pacific FC** – 2024–

=== Honduras ===
- José Escalante – Cavalry FC – 2019–23

=== Jamaica ===
- Shawn-Claud Lawson – Atlético Ottawa – 2021
- Nicholas Hamilton – York9/York United – 2020–21
- Tevin Shaw – Atlético Ottawa – 2020–21
- Alex Marshall – HFX Wanderers – 2020–22

=== Mexico ===
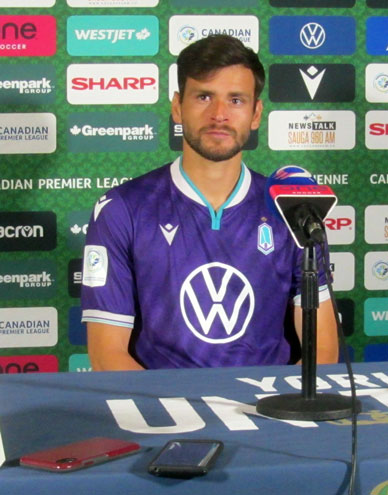
- Alejandro Díaz has scored two hattricks, tying him for the most hattricks scored in league history
  Francisco Acuña – Atlético Ottawa – 2020
- **Orlando Botello** – **York United** – 2024–
- **Alejandro Díaz** – Pacific FC, **Vancouver FC** – 2020–
- **Josué Martínez** – **York United** – 2024–
- Vladimir Moragrega – Atlético Ottawa – 2023
- **Daniel Parra** – **Forge FC** – 2024–
- Rodrigo Reyes – Valour FC – 2021
- Gael Sandoval – Vancouver FC – 2023

=== Panama ===
- Omar Browne – Forge FC – 2021–22
- Alexander González – Pacific FC – 2019
- Amir Soto – Valour FC – 2020–21

=== Saint Kitts and Nevis ===
- Justin Springer – York9 – 2019

=== Trinidad and Tobago ===
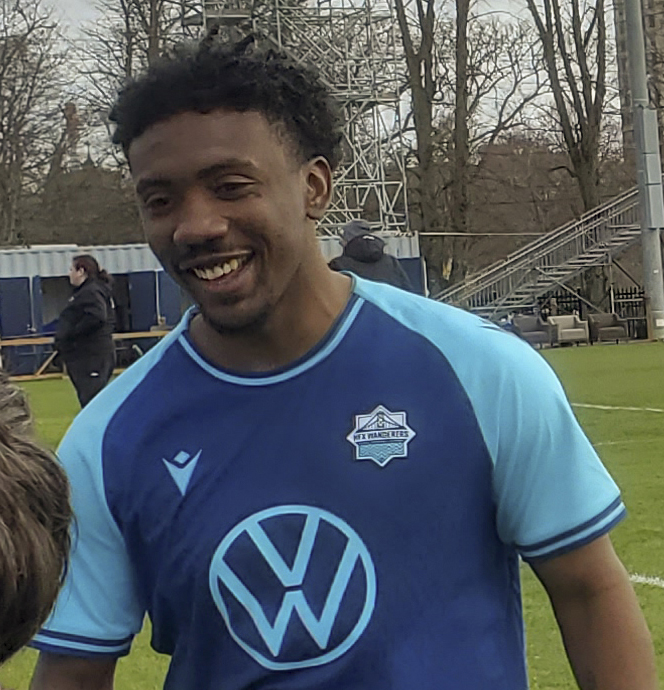
Akeem García won the CPL Golden Boot in 2020 with HFX Wanderers.

- Akeem García – HFX Wanderers – 2019–22
- Elton John – HFX Wanderers – 2019
- **Reon Moore** – **Pacific FC** – 2024–
- Kareem Moses – FC Edmonton – 2019–20
- Federico Peña – Valour FC – 2019–22
- **Andre Rampersad** – **HFX Wanderers** – 2019–
- **Malcolm Shaw** – Atlético Ottawa, **Cavalry FC** – 2020–
- **Luke Singh** – FC Edmonton, Atlético Ottawa, **Atlético Ottawa** – 2022–
- **Ryan Telfer** – York9, Atlético Ottawa, **HFX Wanderers** – 2019–21, 2024–
- Jan-Michael Williams – HFX Wanderers – 2019–20

=== Turks and Caicos (Turks and Caicos Islands) ===
- Billy Forbes – Valour FC – 2022

=== United States ===
- Roberto Avila – FC Edmonton – 2021
- Jonathan Ezparza – Valour FC – 2022
- Azriel González – FC Edmonton – 2021–22
- Hunter Gorskie – FC Edmonton – 2021
- Osvaldo Ramirez – York United – 2021
- Adisa De Rosario – HFX Wanderers, York United – 2022, 2023
- Ahinga Selemani – Cavalry FC, Valour FC – 2021, 2023
- Blake Smith – Pacific FC – 2019
- **Christian Volesky** – **HFX Wanderers** – 2024–
- Jeremy Zielinski – Vancouver FC – 2023

== Oceania (OFC) ==
=== New Zealand ===
- **Myer Bevan** – **Cavalry FC** – 2022–
- Moses Dyer – Valour FC – 2020–22

== South America (CONMEBOL) ==
=== Argentina ===
- Lisandro Cabrera – York United – 2021–22
- Kevin Ceceri– Pacific FC – 202
- Mateo Hernández – York United – 2021–22

=== Brazil ===
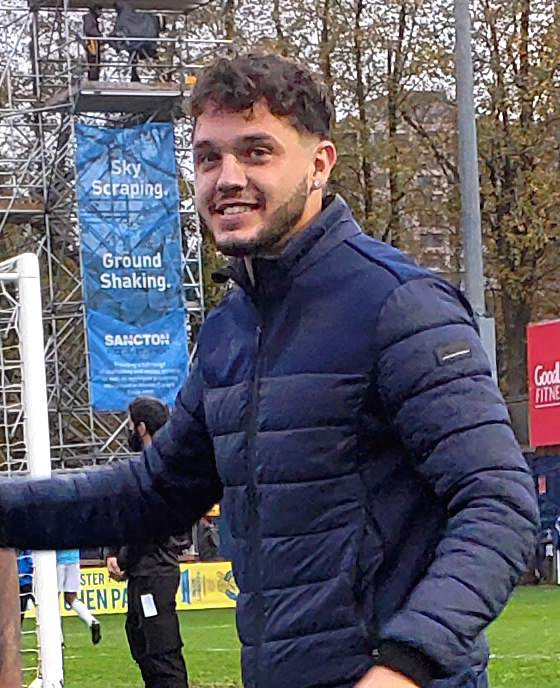
João Morelli won the 2021 CPL Golden Boot with HFX Wanderers.

- **Vitor Dias** – **HFX Wanderers** – 2024–
- **Renan Garcia** – **Vancouver FC** – 2023–
- Rafael Galhardo – Valour FC – 2021–22
- Eduardo Jesus – York United – 2022
- Richard Luca – Cavalry FC – 2020–21
- Oliver Minatel – Cavalry FC, York United – 2019–22
- João Morelli – HFX Wanderers – 2020–23
- Eriks Santos – HFX Wanderers – 2020–22
- Gabriel Vasconcelos – York9 – 2020
- William Wallace – York United – 2021–22

=== Chile ===
- Rodrigo Gattas – York9 – 2019
- Walter Ponce – Valour FC – 2022–23

=== Colombia ===
- Daniel Ascanio – Valour FC – 2022
- Sebastián Gutiérrez – York United – 2021–22
- Ivan Mejia – Vancouver FC – 2023–
- Carlos Patiño – Cavalry FC – 2019
- Luis Perea – HFX Wanderers – 2019
- Kevin Rendón – Valour FC – 2022–23

=== Ecuador ===
- Liberman Torres – Atlético Ottawa – 2024

=== Peru ===
- Jair Córdova – Cavalry FC – 2020
- Juan Gutiérrez – HFX Wanderers – 2019
- Jared Ulloa – Valour FC – 2021, 2023

=== Uruguay ===
- Martín Arguiñarena – Valour FC – 2019

== See also ==
- List of foreign CSL players
- List of foreign MLS players

== Notes ==
1. Born in Benin.
2. Born in Belgium.
3. Born in Canada.
4. Born in Democratic Republic of Congo.
5. Born in England.
6. Born in France.
7. Born in Guinea-Bissau.
8. Born in Guinea.
9. Born in Greece.
10. Born in Kenya.
11. Born in Saudi Arabia.
12. Born in Spain.
13. Born in Netherlands.
14. Born in United Arab Emirates.
15. Born in United States of America.
16. Capped for Canada men's national soccer team.
17. Capped for Canada men's national under-17 soccer team.
18. Capped for Canada men's national under-20 soccer team.
19. Capped for Canada men's national under-23 soccer team.
20. Capped for France men's national under-19 soccer team.
21. Capped for United States men's national soccer team.
22. Capped for United States men's national under-18 soccer team.
23. Registered in roster as a domestic player.
