= 2023 Atlético Ottawa season =

Atlético Ottawa 2023 soccer season

Atlético Ottawa
2023 season
- CEO: Fernando Lopez
- Head coach: Carlos González
- Stadium: TD Place Stadium
- Canadian Premier League: 6th
- CPL Playoffs: Did Not Qualify
- Canadian Championship: Quarter Final
- Top goalscorer: League: Ollie Bassett (11); All: Ollie Bassett (12)
- Highest home attendance: 7,044 (September 24 vs. Valour FC)
- Lowest home attendance: 3,074 (April 29 vs. York United FC)
- Average home league attendance: 4,936
- Biggest win: 5-0 @ Vancouver FC (May 13)
- Biggest defeat: 1-4 vs. Pacific FC (May 6)
Home colours	Away colours

The 2023 Atlético Ottawa season was the fourth season in the history of Atlético Ottawa. In addition to the Canadian Premier League, the club will compete in the Canadian Championship. This was the club's second season under head coach Carlos González.

In the previous season, the club finished 1st in the Canadian Premier League regular season, before losing to Forge FC in the post-season Final.

== Current squad ==
As of July 28, 2023

No.	Name	Nationality	Position(s)	Date of birth (age)	Previous club
Goalkeepers
1	Sean Melvin	(Canada)	GK	July 9, 1994 (aged 29)	(United States) Colorado Springs Switchbacks
29	Nathan Ingham	(Canada)	GK	January 27, 1993 (aged 30)	(Canada) York United FC
Defenders
3	Macdonald Niba	(Cameroon)	CB	August 8, 1994 (aged 29)	(Finland) Kuopion Palloseura
4	Diego Espejo	(Spain)	CB	August 18, 2002 (aged 21)	(Spain) Atlético Madrid B
5	Luke Singh	(Trinidad and Tobago)	CB	September 12, 2000 (aged 23)	(Canada) Toronto FC
15	Maxim Tissot	(Canada)	LB / DM	April 13, 1992 (aged 31)	(Canada) Forge FC
17	Miguel Acosta	(Spain)	RB / LB / CB	March 16, 1998 (aged 25)	(Spain) Atlético Baleares
20	Karl Ouimette	(Canada)	CB	June 18, 1992 (aged 31)	(Canada) Indy Eleven
23	Tyr Walker	(Canada)	CB / FB	October 22, 2003 (aged 20)	(Canada) Acadia University
46	Zachary Roy	(Canada)	RB	June 24, 2003 (aged 20)	(Canada) CS St-Hubert
91	Aboubakary Sacko	(France)	LB	January 31, 2003 (aged 20)	(France) Le Havre B
Midfielders
10	Ollie Bassett	(Northern Ireland)	AM / LW	March 6, 1998 (aged 25)	(Canada) Pacific FC
11	Noah Verhoeven	(Canada)	CM	June 15, 1999 (aged 24)	(Canada) York United
14	Jean-Aniel Assi	(Canada)	LW / RW	August 12, 2004 (aged 19)	(Canada) CF Montréal
16	Zach Verhoven	(Canada)	LW / RW / RB	August 17, 1998 (aged 25)	(Canada) Pacific FC
21	Alberto Zapater	(Spain)	DM	June 13, 1985 (aged 38)	(Spain) Real Zaragoza
26	Omar Darwish	(Canada)	DM	January 30, 2005 (aged 18)	(Canada) OSU Atletico
30	Gabriel Antinoro	(Canada)	LW	April 24, 2004 (aged 19)	(Canada) CF Montréal
96	Ilias Iliadis	(Greece)	DM / LB	March 21, 2001 (aged 22)	(Canada) CF Montréal
Forwards
7	Gianni dos Santos	(Cape Verde)	LW	November 21, 1998 (aged 25)	(Canada) Pacific FC
9	Carl Haworth	(Canada)	RW / RB	July 9, 1989 (aged 34)	(United States) Indy Eleven
18	Samuel Salter	(Canada)	CF	August 9, 2000 (aged 23)	(Canada) HFX Wanderers
19	Malcolm Shaw	(Trinidad and Tobago)	CF / RW	July 27, 1995 (aged 28)	(Sweden) Assyriska IK
99	Ruben Del Campo	(Switzerland)	CF / LW	February 23, 2000 (aged 23)	(Spain) San Fernando CD

== Transfers ==
=== In ===
==== Transferred in ====
No.	Pos.	Player	From club	Fee/notes	Date	Source
20	DF	(Canada) Karl Ouimette	(United States) Indy Eleven	Free transfer	January 31, 2023	
11	MF	(Canada) Noah Verhoeven	(Canada) York United	Free transfer	February 3, 2023	
18	FW	(Canada) Samuel Salter	(Canada) HFX Wanderers	Undisclosed fee & sell-on clause	February 16, 2023	
7	FW	(Cape Verde) Gianni dos Santos	(Canada) Pacific FC	Free	February 21, 2023	
30	MF	(Canada) Gabriel Antinoro	(Canada) CF Montréal	Free	February 23, 2023	
91	DF	(France) Aboubakary Sacko	(France) Le Havre B	Free	March 8, 2023	
12	MF	(Canada) Junior Agyekum	(Canada) Rivers FC	U-Sports Draft Pick	April 14, 2023	
23	DF	(Canada) Tyr Walker	(Canada) Acadia University	U-Sports Development contract	April 21, 2023	
25	GK	(Canada) Brogan Engbers	Unattached	Free	May 6, 2023	
99	FW	(Switzerland) Ruben Del Campo	(Spain) San Fernando CD	Free	June 28, 2023	
21	MF	(Spain) Alberto Zapater	(Spain) Real Zaragoza	Free	June 28, 2023	
	MF	(Canada) Omar Darwish		Development contract	June 29, 2023	

==== Loans in ====
No.	Pos.	Player	Loaned from	Fee/notes	Date	Source
4	DF	(Spain) Diego Espejo	(Spain) Atlético Madrid B	Loan extended	December 22, 2022	
14	MF	(Canada) Jean-Aniel Assi	(Canada) CF Montréal	Loan	February 15, 2023	
5	DF	(Trinidad and Tobago) Luke Singh	(Canada) Toronto FC	Loan	March 2, 2023	
96	MF	(Greece) Ilias Iliadis	(Canada) CF Montreal	Loan	July 28, 2023	

==== Draft picks ====
Atlético Ottawa made the 8th and 15th selections in the 2023 CPL–U Sports Draft. Draft picks are not automatically signed to the team roster. Only those who are signed to a contract will be listed as transfers in.

Round	Selection	Pos.	Player	Nationality	University
1	8	MF	Junior Agyekum	Canada	Thompson Rivers
2	15	FW	Mohamed Bouzidi	Canada	Carleton

=== Out ===
==== Transferred out ====
No.	Pos.	Player	To club	Fee/notes	Date	Source
14	MF	(Canada) Owen Antoniuk	Free agent	Loan expired; released from parent club	November 18, 2022	
5	DF	(Spain) Sergio Camus	(Spain) Atlético Madrid B	Loan expired; returned to parent club	November 30, 2022	
33	DF	(Spain) Iván Pérez	(Spain) Mar Menor FC	Option declined	November 30, 2022	
6	MF	(Canada) Chris Mannella		Contract expired	November 30, 2022	
7	MF	(Canada) Keven Alemán		Option declined	November 30, 2022	
8	MF	(Canada) Ben McKendry		Contract expired	November 30, 2022	
12	DF	(Canada) Gabriel Carvalho		Development contract expired	November 30, 2022	
	MF	(Canada) Omar Darwish		Development contract expired	November 30, 2022	
	FW	(Canada) Anthony Domanico		Development contract expired	November 30, 2022	
2	DF	(Canada) Drew Beckie	Retired	Retired	December 3, 2022	
11	FW	(Mexico) Vladimir Moragrega	(Mexico) Atlético San Luis	Loan expired; returned to parent club	December 13, 2022	
9	FW	(Canada) Brian Wright	(Canada) York United	Option declined	January 9, 2023	
20	MF	(France) Abdoul Sissoko	(Kuwait) Qadsia SC	Option declined	January 9, 2023	
13	FW	(Canada) Ballou Tabla	(Turkey) Manisa F.K.	Transfer; fee undisclosed	January 25, 2023	
25	GK	(Canada) Brogan Engbers		Emergency contract expired	June 9, 2023	
12	MF	(Canada) Junior Agyekum		Released	June 28, 2023	
22	MF	(Canada) Zakaria Bahous	(Canada) Pacific FC	Released	July 28, 2023	

== Pre-season friendlies ==
8 March 2023 Friendly	(Spain) UD Sanse	2-2	Atlético Ottawa	San Sebastien de los Reyes, Spain
11:30 CET			Shaw; Duhaney-Walker	Stadium: Estadio Nuevo Matapiñonera

12 March 2023 Friendly	Atlético Ottawa	0-0	(Spain) Atlético Madrid B	Alcalá de Henares, Community of Madrid, Spain
12:30 CET				Stadium: Centro Deportivo Wanda Alcalá de Henares

16 March 2023 Friendly	Atlético Ottawa	1-0	(Spain) Getafe B	Alcalá de Henares, Community of Madrid, Spain
12:30 CET	Bassett 38'			Stadium: Centro Deportivo Wanda Alcalá de Henares

22 March 2023 Friendly	Real Madrid Castilla (Spain)	2-0	Atlético Ottawa	Valdebebas, Spain
11:30 CET		Report		Stadium: Ciudad Real Madrid

29 March 2023 Friendly	CF Fuenlabrada (Spain)	3-1	Atlético Ottawa	Fuenlabrada, Spain
17:00 CET			Shaw 71'	Stadium: Estadio Fernando Torres

8 April 2023 Friendly	Atlético Ottawa	6–1	CF Montréal U23	Ottawa, Ontario
12:00 ET	Bassett 20' (pen.) 44'; dos Santos 26'; Shaw; Antinoro	Report	(pen.)	Stadium: TD Place Stadium; Referee: Renzo Villanueva

== Competitions ==
=== Canadian Premier League ===
==== Table ====
Pos	Team	Pld	W	D	L	GF	GA	GD	Pts	Playoff qualification
1	Cavalry (S)	28	16	7	5	46	27	+19	55	First semifinal
2	Forge (C)	28	11	9	8	39	32	+7	42 (Note: Tie resolved by away goal differential; Forge: +4, Wanderers: −2)	First semifinal
3	HFX Wanderers	28	11	9	8	39	32	+7	42	Quarterfinal
4	Pacific	28	11	7	10	42	35	+7	40	Play-in round
5	York United	28	11	5	12	35	44	−9	38	Play-in round
6	Atlético Ottawa	28	10	6	12	38	34	+4	36	
7	Vancouver	28	8	5	15	28	50	−22	29	
8	Valour	28	6	8	14	25	38	−13	26	

Source: CanPL
Rules for classification: 1) Points; 2) Total wins; 3) Goal difference; 4) Goals scored; 5) Away goal differential; 6) Away goals scored; 7) Home goal differential; 8) Home goals scored; 9) Total minutes played by U-21 players; 10) Coin toss (2 teams tied) or drawing of lots (3+ teams tied).
(C) Champion (qualified to Champions Cup); (S) CPL Shield winner (qualified to Champions Cup)

==== Results by Match ====
Match	1	2	3	4	5	6	7	8	9	10	11	12	13	14	15	16	17	18	19	20	21	22	23	24	25	26	27	28
Result	D	D	L	L	W	L	L	W	L	W	L	D	W	W	W	L	W	D	W	W	D	L	L	D	L	L	L	W
Position	6	7	8	8	4	7	8	6	7	7	7	7	6	6	4	6	5	4	4	3	3	4	5	4	5	5	6	6

Source: Matches
W = Win; D = Draw; L = Loss

==== Matches ====
April 15 1	Atlético Ottawa	1-1	HFX Wanderers	Ottawa, Ontario
1:00pm ET	Acosta (yellow card) 32'; Bassett 45+2'; Sacko (yellow card) 90+4'	Report	Fernandez 16'; Omar (yellow card) 59'; Watson (yellow card) 76'	Stadium: TD Place Stadium; Attendance: 7,040; Referee: Michael Venne

April 22 2	Valour FC	1-1	Atlético Ottawa	Winnipeg, Manitoba
7:00pm ET	Gutiérrez 3'; Novak (yellow card) 10'; Campbell (yellow card) 59'; Pianelli (yellow card) 81'		dos Santos 32'; Espejo (yellow card) 68'; Salter (yellow card) 90+3'	Stadium: IG Field; Referee: Marie-Soleil Beaudoin

April 29 3	Atlético Ottawa	0-1	York United	Ottawa, Ontario
5:00pm ET	Espejo (yellow card) 53'		Babouli 42' (yellow card) 90+5'; Alou (yellow card) 44'; Gee (yellow card) 90+1'; Faye (yellow card) 90+5'	Stadium: TD Place Stadium; Attendance: 3,074; Referee: Mathieu Souaré

May 6 4	Atlético Ottawa	1-4	Pacific FC	Ottawa, Ontario
7:00pm ET	Shaw (yellow card) 44'; Bassett 52'; Assi (yellow card) 54'; Sacko (yellow card) 75'; dos Santos (yellow card) 90+3'		Young 6'; Heard 9'; Sellouf 34'; Didic 69'	Stadium: TD Place Stadium; Attendance: 3,499; Referee: Fabrizio Stasolla

May 13 5	Vancouver FC	0-5	Atlético Ottawa	Langley, British Columbia
9:30pm ET	Sandoval (yellow card) 56'; Kinani (yellow card) 84'		Bassett 8'; Salter 36'; Verhoeven (yellow card) 40' (goal) 59'; Singh (yellow card) 42'; Verhoven 71'; Bahous 72'; Shaw (yellow card) 87'	Stadium: Willoughby Community Park; Attendance: 2,800

May 21 6	Cavalry FC	2-0	Atlético Ottawa	Calgary, Alberta
7:00pm ET	Escalante (yellow card) 10'; Camargo 22'; Klomp 67'; Kamdem (yellow card) 71'		Assi (yellow card) 21'; Salter (yellow card) 70'	Stadium: ATCO Field; Referee: Michael Venne

May 27 7	Atlético Ottawa	0-1	Forge FC	Ottawa, Ontario
2:00pm ET	Espejo (yellow card) 30'		Duncan (yellow card) 48'; Owolabi-Belewu (yellow card) 64'; Choinière 90+1'	Stadium: TD Place Stadium; Attendance: 4,520; Referee: Renzo Villanueva

June 3 8	Atlético Ottawa	2-0	HFX Wanderers	Ottawa, Ontario
7:00pm ET	Singh (yellow card) 52'; Bassett 71'; Shaw 76'		Loughrey (yellow card) 23'; Ferrazzo (yellow card) 34'; Fernandez (yellow card) 82'	Stadium: TD Place Stadium; Attendance: 5,058; Referee: Marie-Soleil Beaudoin

June 9 9	York United	2-1	Atlético Ottawa	Toronto, Ontario
7:30pm ET	Singh 24' (o.g.); Ricci (yellow card) 43'; De Rosario 80'		Verhoven 8' (yellow card) 51'	Stadium: York Lions Stadium; Referee: Scott Bowman

June 17 10	Atlético Ottawa	1-0	Vancouver FC	Ottawa, Ontario
2:00pm ET	Salter 9'; Singh (yellow card) 61'		Cameron (yellow card) 43'; Bakare (yellow card) 72'; Romeo (yellow card) 82'	Stadium: TD Place Stadium; Attendance: 5,017; Referee: Yusri Rudolf

June 25 11	Forge FC	4-3	Atlético Ottawa	Hamilton, Ontario
6:00pm ET	Niba 4' (o.g.); Campbell 11' 32'; Pacius (yellow card) 45+2' (goal) 81'; Sissoko (yellow card) 55'; Samuel (yellow card) 67'		Antinoro 1'; Niba (yellow card) 45+4'; Tissot 64'; Salter (yellow card) 67'; dos Santos 72'	Stadium: Tim Hortons Field; Referee: Michael Venne

June 30 12	Pacific FC	2-2	Atlético Ottawa	Langford, British Columbia
9:30pm ET	Meilleur-Giguère 45+5'; Sellouf 49'; Yeates (yellow card) 64'; Daniels (yellow card) 89'		Salter 19'; Bassett 53' (pen.); Niba (yellow card) 56'; Espejo (red card) 84'; Ingham (yellow card) 90+2'; Assi (yellow card) 90+3'	Stadium: Starlight Stadium; Referee: Alain Ruch

July 9 13	Atlético Ottawa	2-0	Valour FC	Ottawa, Ontario
3:00pm ET	Bassett 25' (pen.) (yellow card) 35'; Verhoven 90+3'			Stadium: TD Place Stadium; Attendance: 5,003; Referee: Fabrizio Stasolla

July 12 14	Cavalry FC	0-2	Atlético Ottawa	Calgary, Alberta
8:30pm ET	Camargo (yellow card) 68'; Carducci (yellow card) 81'		Acosta (yellow card) 12'; Zapater (yellow card) 22'; Bassett (yellow card) 24' (goal) 82' (pen.); Antinoro (yellow card) 77'; Verhoven (yellow card) 80'; Assi 86'	Stadium: ATCO Field; Attendance: 3,189

July 16 15	Atlético Ottawa	3-1	Vancouver FC	Ottawa, Ontario
2:00pm ET	Acosta 12'; Antinoro 62'; del Campo (yellow card) 90+4'; Haworth 90+5'		Cantave (yellow card) 19'; Díaz 55'; Kwak (yellow card) 90+1'	Stadium: TD Place Stadium; Attendance: 4,016

July 23 16	HFX Wanderers	1-0	Atlético Ottawa	Halifax, Nova Scotia
4:00pm ET	Collomb 24'	Report	Haworth (yellow card) 54'; Ouimette (yellow card) 71'	Stadium: Wanderers Grounds; Attendance: 5,884; Referee: Sebastian Noshinravani

July 29 17	Atlético Ottawa	1-0	Cavalry FC	Ottawa, Ontario
7:00pm ET	Salter 7'; Zapater (yellow card) 25'; Ouimette (yellow card) 31'	Report	Trafford (yellow card) 54'	Stadium: TD Place Stadium; Attendance: 5,033

August 5 18	Atlético Ottawa	3-3	York United	Ottawa, Ontario
7:00pm ET	Haworth 35' 59'; Espejo (yellow card) 45+2' (goal) 81'		Wright 24'; Santos 26'; Ingham 62' (o.g.); Gee (yellow card) 63'; Soumaoro (yellow card) 74'	Stadium: TD Place Stadium; Attendance: 5,258; Referee: David Barrie

August 13 19	Pacific FC	0-1	Atlético Ottawa	Langford, British Columbia
4:30pm ET	Heard (yellow card) 69'; Gazdov (yellow card) 90+8'		Del Campo (yellow card) 33'; Bassett 38'; Ingham (yellow card) 62'; Salter (yellow card) 90+8'	Stadium: Starlight Stadium; Referee: Scott Bowman

August 18 20	Valour FC	1-3	Atlético Ottawa	Winnipeg, Manitoba
8:00pm ET	Haynes (yellow card) 29'; de Brienne (yellow card) 55'; Polisi 73'		Salter 10'; Bassett 41' 68'	Stadium: IG Field; Referee: Mathieu Souaré

August 26 21	Atlético Ottawa	0-0	Forge FC	Ottawa, Ontario
7:00pm ET	Iliadis (yellow card) 49'; Verhoven (yellow card) 84'; Singh (yellow card) 90+3'	Report		Stadium: TD Place Stadium; Attendance: 5,211; Referee: Yusri Rudolf

September 2 22	Atlético Ottawa	1-2	Cavalry FC	Ottawa, Ontario
7:00pm ET	Singh (yellow card) 31' (goal) 88'; Salter (yellow card) 61'; Bassett (yellow card) 68'; Ouimette (yellow card) 80'		Kobza (yellow card) 25'; Camargo 45'; Daley (yellow card) 49'; Kamdem (yellow card) 60'; Akio 90+7'	Stadium: TD Place Stadium; Attendance: 5,092; Referee: Ben Hoskins

September 9 23	Vancouver FC	2-1	Atlético Ottawa	Langley, British Columbia
10:00pm ET	Cantave 6'; Cameron 90+1'; Bitar (yellow card) 90+5'; Fry (yellow card) 90+6'		Bassett 18'; Iliadis (yellow card) 67'; Verhoeven (yellow card) 80'; Acosta (yellow card) 90+3'	Stadium: Willoughby Community Park; Attendance: 2,163; Referee: Sebastian Noshinravani

September 13 24	Atlético Ottawa	1-1	Pacific FC	Ottawa, Ontario
5:30pm ET	Ouimette (yellow card) 59'; Tissot 65'; Zapater (yellow card) 90+1'		Yeates 29'; Dada-Luke (yellow card) 52'; Bahous (yellow card) 74'; Daniels (yellow card) 79'	Stadium: TD Place Stadium; Attendance: 4,236; Referee: Scott Bowman

September 18 25	HFX Wanderers	3-2	Atlético Ottawa	Halifax, Nova Scotia
6:00pm ET	Ferrin 49'; Omar (yellow card) 50'; Perruzza 56'; Rampersad (yellow card) 74'; Fernandez (yellow card) 90+1'; Giraldo 90+2'; Watson (red card) 90+4'; Fillion (yellow card) 90+6'		Salter 13' 90+1'; Antinoro (yellow card) 53'; Roy (yellow card) 90+1'	Stadium: Wanderers Grounds; Referee: Renzo Villanueva

September 24 26	Atlético Ottawa	0-1	Valour FC	Ottawa, Ontario
2:00pm ET	Tissot (yellow card) 25'; Iliadis (yellow card) 45+1'		Gutierrez (yellow card) 68'; Ponce (yellow card) 90+4'	Stadium: TD Place Stadium; Attendance: 7,044; Referee: Michael Venne

October 1 27	York United	1-0	Atlético Ottawa	Toronto, Ontario
1:00pm ET	Soumaoro (yellow card) 38'; Santos 88' (yellow card) 90+5'		Salter (yellow card) 41'; Haworth (yellow card) 83'; Antinoro (yellow card) 90+1'; Espejo (yellow card) 90+6'	Stadium: York Lions Stadium; Referee: David Barrie

October 7 28	Forge FC	0-1	Atlético Ottawa	Hamilton, Ontario
5:00pm ET	Pacius (yellow card) 28'; James (yellow card) 32'; Achinioti-Jönsson (yellow card) 43'		Santos (yellow card) 43' (goal) 54'; Ouimette (yellow card) 74'; Verhoven (yellow card) 81'	Stadium: Tim Hortons Field; Referee: Scott Bowman

=== Canadian Championship ===
April 19, 2023 1	HFX Wanderers	1-3	Atlético Ottawa	Toronto, Ontario
5:00 PM ET	Ferrin 19'; Campagna (yellow card) 45+2'; Callegari (yellow card) 90+5'		Antinoro (yellow card) 28'; Shaw 40'; Espejo 44'; Tissot 85'	Stadium: York Lions Stadium; Referee: Myriam Marcotte

May 9, 2023 QF	Forge FC	1-1 (3-2 p)	Atlético Ottawa	Hamilton, Ontario
7:00 PM EST	Hojabrpour (yellow card) 55'; Bekker 76'; James (yellow card) 86'; Rama (yellow card) 90+7'		Verhoeven (yellow card) 83'; Bassett 87' (pen.); dos Santos (yellow card) 90'	Stadium: Tim Hortons Field; Referee: Filip Dujic
	Penalties
	Borges (penalty missed); Jensen (penalty scored); Pacius (penalty missed); Achinioti-Jonsson (penalty scored); Hamilton (penalty missed); Sissoko (penalty scored)		(penalty missed) Shaw; (penalty missed) Bassett; (penalty missed) Salter; (penalty scored) dos Santos; (penalty scored) Singh; (penalty missed) Verhoven

== Statistics ==
=== Squad and statistics ===
As of October 7, 2023

No.	Pos	Nat	Player	Total		Canadian Premier League		Canadian Championship	
No.	Pos	Nat	Player	Apps	Goals	Apps	Goals	Apps	Goals
1	GK	(Canada) CAN	Sean Melvin	7	0	6+0	0	1+0	0
3	DF	(Cameroon) CMR	Macdonald Niba	13	0	9+3	0	1+0	0
4	DF	(Spain) ESP	Diego Espejo	21	2	18+1	1	2+0	1
5	DF	(Trinidad and Tobago) TTO	Luke Singh	27	1	25+0	1	1+1	0
7	FW	(Cape Verde) CPV	Gianni dos Santos	21	2	10+9	2	1+1	0
9	FW	(Canada) CAN	Carl Haworth	17	3	7+10	3	0+0	0
10	MF	(Northern Ireland) NIR	Ollie Bassett	29	12	27+0	11	2+0	1
11	MF	(Canada) CAN	Noah Verhoeven	27	1	15+10	1	1+1	0
12	MF	(Canada) CAN	Junior Agyekum	0	0	0+0	0	0+0	0
14	MF	(Canada) CAN	Jean-Aniel Assi	28	1	20+6	1	2+0	0
15	DF	(Canada) CAN	Maxim Tissot	16	3	12+3	2	1+0	1
16	MF	(Canada) CAN	Zach Verhoven	23	3	8+14	3	0+1	0
17	DF	(Spain) ESP	Miguel Acosta	27	1	24+1	1	2+0	0
18	FW	(Canada) CAN	Samuel Salter	28	7	17+9	7	0+2	0
19	FW	(Trinidad and Tobago) TTO	Malcolm Shaw	24	2	12+10	1	2+0	1
20	DF	(Canada) CAN	Karl Ouimette	28	0	24+2	0	2+0	0
21	MF	(Spain) ESP	Alberto Zapater	16	0	15+1	0	0+0	0
22	MF	(Canada) CAN	Zakaria Bahous	14	1	4+8	1	2+0	0
23	DF	(Canada) CAN	Tyr Walker	5	0	3+2	0	0+0	0
25	GK	(Canada) CAN	Brogan Engbers	0	0	0+0	0	0+0	0
26	MF	(Canada) CAN	Omar Darwish	0	0	0+0	0	0+0	0
29	GK	(Canada) CAN	Nathan Ingham	20	0	19+0	0	1+0	0
30	MF	(Canada) CAN	Gabriel Antinoro	24	2	8+15	2	0+1	0
46	DF	(Canada) CAN	Zachary Roy	3	0	1+2	0	0+0	0
91	DF	(France) FRA	Aboubakary Sacko	10	0	5+4	0	1+0	0
96	MF	(Greece) GRE	Ilias Iliadis	11	1	8+3	1	0+0	0
99	FW	(Switzerland) SUI	Ruben Del Campo	15	0	5+10	0	0+0	0

=== Top scorers ===
Rank	Nat.	Player	Pos.	Canadian Premier League	Canadian Championship	Total
1	(Northern Ireland)	Ollie Bassett	MF	11	1	12
2	(Canada)	Samuel Salter	FW	7	0	7
3	(Canada)	Zach Verhoven	MF	3	0	3
3	(Canada)	Carl Haworth	MF	3	0	3
3	(Canada)	Maxim Tissot	DF	2	1	3
6	(Trinidad and Tobago)	Malcolm Shaw	FW	1	1	2
6	(Cape Verde)	Gianni dos Santos	FW	2	0	2
6	(Canada)	Gabriel Antinoro	MF	2	0	2
6	(Spain)	Diego Espejo	DF	1	1	2
10	(Canada)	Noah Verhoeven	MF	1	0	1
10	(Canada)	Zakaria Bahous	MF	1	0	1
10	(Canada)	Jean-Aniel Assi	MF	1	0	1
10	(Spain)	Miguel Acosta	DF	1	0	1
10	(Trinidad and Tobago)	Luke Singh	DF	1	0	1
10	(Greece)	Ilias Iliadis	MF	1	0	1
Totals				38	4	42

Updated to match played October 7, 2023
Source: Canadian Premier League

=== Top assists ===
Rank	Nat.	Player	Pos.	Canadian Premier League	Canadian Championship	Total
1	(Canada)	Jean-Aniel Assi	MF	3	1	4
1	(Canada)	Carl Haworth	MF	4	0	4
3	(Northern Ireland)	Ollie Bassett	MF	3	0	3
3	(Cape Verde)	Gianni dos Santos	FW	2	1	3
5	(Canada)	Noah Verhoeven	MF	2	0	2
5	(Spain)	Miguel Acosta	DF	2	0	2
5	(Canada)	Zach Verhoven	MF	2	0	2
5	(Switzerland)	Ruben Del Campo	FW	2	0	2
9	(Trinidad and Tobago)	Malcolm Shaw	FW	1	0	1
9	(Cameroon)	Macdonald Niba	MF	1	0	1
9	(Canada)	Samuel Salter	FW	1	0	1
Totals				22	2	24

Updated to match played September 9, 2023
Source: Canadian Premier League

=== Clean sheets ===
Rank	Nat.	Player	Canadian Premier League	Canadian Championship	TOTAL
1	(Canada)	Nathan Ingham	7	0	7
2	(Canada)	Sean Melvin	2	0	2
Totals			9	0	9

=== Disciplinary record ===
No.	Pos.	Nat.	Player	Canadian Premier League		Canadian Championship		TOTAL	
No.	Pos.	Nat.	Player	Booked	Sent off (straight red)	Booked	Sent off (straight red)	Booked	Sent off (straight red)
3	DF	(Cameroon)	Macdonald Niba	2	0	0	0	2	0
4	DF	(Spain)	Diego Espejo	5	1	0	0	5	1
5	DF	(Trinidad and Tobago)	Luke Singh	5	0	0	0	5	0
7	FW	(Cape Verde)	Gianni dos Santos	1	0	1	0	2	0
9	FW	(Canada)	Carl Haworth	2	0	0	0	2	0
10	MF	(Northern Ireland)	Ollie Bassett	3	0	0	0	3	0
11	MF	(Canada)	Noah Verhoeven	2	0	1	0	3	0
14	MF	(Canada)	Jean Aniel Assi	3	0	0	0	2	0
15	DF	(Canada)	Maxim Tissot	1	0	0	0	1	0
16	MF	(Canada)	Zach Verhoven	3	0	0	0	3	0
17	DF	(Spain)	Miguel Acosta	3	0	0	0	3	0
18	FW	(Canada)	Sam Salter	6	0	0	0	6	0
19	FW	(Trinidad and Tobago)	Malcolm Shaw	2	0	0	0	2	0
20	DF	(Canada)	Karl Ouimette	5	0	0	0	5	0
21	MF	(Spain)	Alberto Zapater	3	0	0	0	3	0
29	GK	(Canada)	Nathan Ingham	2	0	0	0	2	0
30	MF	(Canada)	Gabriel Antinoro	3	0	1	0	4	0
46	DF	(Canada)	Zachary Roy	1	0	0	0	1	0
91	DF	(France)	Aboubakary Sacko	2	0	0	0	2	0
96	MF	(Greece)	Ilias Iliadis	4	0	0	0	4	0
99	FW	(Spain)	Ruben del Campo	2	0	0	0	2	0
Totals				58	1	3	0	61	1
