= Dani Morer =

Spanish footballer

Personal information
- Full name: Daniel Morer Cabrera
- Date of birth: 5 February 1998 (age 28)
- Place of birth: Mataró, Spain
- Height: 1.66 m (5 ft 5 in)
- Position: Right-back

Team information
- Current team: Makedonikos
- Number: 2

Youth career
- 2006–2009: Mataró
- 2009–2017: Barcelona

Senior career*
Years	Team	Apps	(Gls)
2017–2020	Barcelona B	39	(2)
2020–2025	Famalicão	7	(0)
2021–2023	→ Andorra (loan)	45	(1)
2024	→ Atlético Ottawa (loan)	25	(0)
2025	→ Moreirense (loan)	1	(0)
2025–	Makedonikos	17	(2)

International career
2014–2015	Spain U17	10	(0)
- * Club domestic league appearances and goals as of 20 April 2026

Daniel Morer Cabrera (born 5 February 1998) is a Spanish professional footballer who plays as a right-back for Super League Greece 2 club Makedonikos.

== Early life ==
Born in Mataró, Barcelona, Catalonia, to a Spanish father and a Colombian mother, Morer began playing youth footballer at his school, Escuela Valldemia, at age four, before joining CE Mataró at age seven. In 2009, he joined the Barcelona academy. He won the 2017–18 UEFA Youth League with Barcelona.

== Club career ==
In July 2017, he was promoted to FC Barcelona B in Segunda División. Morer made his professional debut on 19 August 2017, in a substitute appearance against Real Valladolid. In July 2019, he renewed his contract for a further season, with an option to extend to the summer of 2021. In August 2019, he was called up to the Barcelona for a La Liga match for the first time, serving as an unused substitute.

In September 2020, he joined Portuguese Primeira Liga club Famalicão on a contract until 2025. The transfer fee was €400,000, with Barcelona retaining 45% of his economic rights. In August 2021, he was loaned to FC Andorra in the Spanish third tier Primera División RFEF. In July 2022, his loan was extended for a second season. However, during his second season with the club, he was plagued by injuries, limiting his play time. In April 2024, he was loaned to Canadian Premier League club Atlético Ottawa. In February 2025, Morer was loaned to Moreirense in the Portuguese first tier. He made his debut for Moreirense on 13 April 2025 against Rio Ave.

In September 2025, Morer signed with Super League Greece 2 club Makedonikos until June 2026.

== International career ==
Morer was born in Spain to a Spanish father and a Colombian mother.

During the 2013-14 season, he was called up to the Spain U16 team. He was later called up to the Spain U17 team, making a total of 10 appearances. He has also been called up to the Spain U19 team. In March 2020, he was named to the preliminary squad for the Spain U23 Olympic team for the 2020 Olympics, however, he was not ultimately named to the squad.

== Career statistics ==
As of 13 April 2025

Appearances and goals by club, season and competition
Club	Season	League			National cup		Continental		Other		Total	
Club	Season	Division	Apps	Goals	Apps	Goals	Apps	Goals	Apps	Goals	Apps	Goals
Barcelona B	2017–18	Segunda División	6	0	—		—		0	0	6	0
Barcelona B	2018–19	Segunda División B	12	0	—		—		1 (Note: Appearance in Copa Catalunya)	0	13	0
Barcelona B	2019–20	Segunda División B	21	2	—		—		4 (Note: Three appearances in Segunda División B play-offs and one in the Copa Catalunya)	0	24	2
Barcelona B	Total		39	2	0	0	0	0	5	0	43	2
Famalicão	2020–21	Primeira Liga	7	0	2	0	—		0	0	9	0
Famalicão	2021–22	Primeira Liga	0	0	0	0	—		1 (Note: Appearance in Taça da Liga)	0	1	0
Famalicão	Total		7	0	2	0	0	0	1	0	10	0
FC Andorra (loan)	2021–22	Primera División RFEF	33	1	1	0	—		0	0	34	1
FC Andorra (loan)	2022–23	Segunda División	12	0	0	0	—		1	0	13	0
FC Andorra (loan)	Total		45	1	1	0	0	0	1	0	47	1
Atlético Ottawa (loan)	2024	Canadian Premier League	25	0	3	0	—		2	0	30	0
Moreirense (loan)	2024–25	Primeira Liga	1	0	0	0	—		0	0	1	0
Career total			117	3	6	0	0	0	9	0	132	3
