= Junior Agyekum =

Canadian soccer player (born 2001)

Personal information
- Full name: Akwasi Agyekum
- Date of birth: March 3, 2002 (age 24)
- Place of birth: Calgary, Alberta, Canada
- Height: 6 ft 1 in (1.85 m)
- Position: Midfielder

Team information
- Current team: Launceston City FC

Youth career
- Calgary West SC
- Springbank SC
- 2018–2021: Vancouver Whitecaps FC

College career
Years	Team	Apps	(Gls)
2021–2023	Thompson Rivers WolfPack	46	(2)

Senior career*
Years	Team	Apps	(Gls)
2022	Rivers FC		(2)
2023	Atlético Ottawa	0	(0)
2024–????	Launceston City FC	16	(1)
2026–	FC Western		
- * Club domestic league appearances and goals as of November 13, 2026

Akwasi "Junior" Agyekum (born March 3, 2002) is a Canadian soccer player who plays for New Zealand club FC Western in the Central League.

== Early life ==
Agyekum began playing youth soccer with Calgary West SC, later joining Springbank SC. In August 2018, he joined the Vancouver Whitecaps Academy, after impressing the club's academy coaches at the Whitecaps’ Southern Alberta Academy Centre.

== University career ==
In 2021, Agyekum began attending Thompson Rivers University, where he played for the men's soccer team. After his rookie season, he was named to the Canada West All-Rookie Team. In 2022, he helped TRU win the national title. At the national championship tournament he was named the Nike Top Performer in two of three TRU matches at nationals, including the final, also being named championship MVP and selected to the tournament all-star team. He was also named TRU's Male Athlete of the Year that season. On September 23, 2023, he scored his first career goal in a 1-0 victory over the Saskatchewan Huskies.

== Club career ==
In 2022, Agyekum played with Rivers FC in League1 British Columbia.

At the 2023 CPL-U Sports Draft, he was selected in the first round (8th overall) by Atlético Ottawa. In April 2023, he signed a U Sports development contract with the club, allowing him to maintain his university eligibility. He became the first Thompson Rivers University player to sign a U Sports contract. While with Ottawa, he participated in community outreach, visiting the club's youth affiliate clubs. In late June 2023, he departed the club by mutual consent.

In 2024, he signed with Launceston City FC in the Australian second tier NPL Tasmania.

== Personal life ==
Along with some friends, he started the Cleats4kids foundation, to help give the less fortunate better access to soccer.

== Career statistics ==
As of July 13, 2024

Club	Season	League			Playoffs		Domestic Cup		Other		Total	
Club	Season	Division	Apps	Goals	Apps	Goals	Apps	Goals	Apps	Goals	Apps	Goals
Atlético Ottawa	2023	Canadian Premier League	0	0	–		0	0	–		0	0
Launceston City FC	2024	NPL Tasmania	16	1	–		2	0	–		18	1
Career total			16	1	0	0	2	0	0	0	18	1
