= Félicia Roy =

Canadian soccer player (born 2006)

Personal information
- Date of birth: April 7, 2006 (age 20)
- Place of birth: Montreal, Québec, Canada
- Height: 1.62 m (5 ft 4 in)
- Position: Midfielder

Team information
- Current team: Montreal Roses FC
- Number: 23

Youth career
- CS Longueuil
- AS Brossard
- 2020–2024: PEF Québec

College career
Years	Team	Apps	(Gls)
2023–2024	Champlain Cavaliers		

Senior career*
Years	Team	Apps	(Gls)
2022–2024	CF Montréal Academy (Note: PEF Quebec changed its name to CF Montréal Aademy in 2023)	21+	(2+)
2025–	Montreal Roses FC	17	(0)

International career^{‡}
2021–2022	Canada U17	10	(0)
- * Club domestic league appearances and goals as of October 20, 2025 ‡ National team caps and goals as of October 15, 2022

Félicia Roy (born April 7, 2006) is a Canadian soccer player who plays for Montreal Roses FC in the Northern Super League.

== Early life ==
Roy began playing youth soccer at age four with CS Longueuil. Afterwards, she joined AS Brossard and later joined the PEF Quebec program at age 14.

== College career ==
Roy attended Champlain College Saint-Lambert. In 2023, she was named the RSEQ Rookie of the Year. In 2024, she was named the RSEQ MVP and named an RSEQ First Team All-Star and a CCAA All-Star.

== Club career ==
In 2022, Roy began playing in Ligue1 Québec with PEF Quebec (later re-branded CF Montreal Academy). She won the league title with the side in 2023.

In January 2025, she signed with Montreal Roses FC in the Northern Super League. In late July 2025, she was named the league's Rookie of the Week.

== International career ==
At age 12, Roy represented Canada at the Danone Nations Cup.

In 2021, she debuted in the Canada national program at a camp with the Canada U17 team. She was then named to the team for the 2022 CONCACAF Women's U-17 Championship, where she won a bronze medal, and the 2022 FIFA U-17 Women's World Cup.

== Personal life ==
Born in Canada, Roy is of Haitian descent through her mother. Her brother, Zachary Roy, is also a professional soccer player.
