= Zachary Roy =

Canadian soccer player (born 2003)

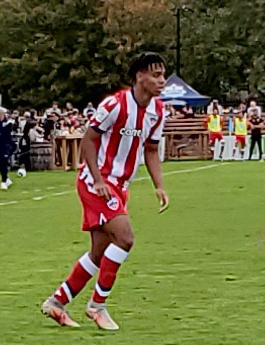
- Roy with Atlético Ottawa in 2022

Personal information
- Date of birth: June 24, 2003 (age 23)
- Place of birth: Saint-Bruno-de-Montarville, Quebec, Canada
- Height: 5 ft 11 in (1.80 m)
- Position: Defender

Team information
- Current team: CS St-Hubert

Youth career
- CS St-Hubert

College career
Years	Team	Apps	(Gls)
2025–	Montreal Carabins		

Senior career*
Years	Team	Apps	(Gls)
2021	CS St-Hubert	2	(0)
2022–2024	Atlético Ottawa	24	(0)
2025–	CS St-Hubert	17	(2)
- * Club domestic league appearances and goals as of September 23, 2025

Zachary Roy (born June 24, 2003) is a Canadian soccer player who plays for CS St-Hubert in Ligue1 Québec.

== Early life ==
Roy played youth soccer with CS St-Hubert. In 2019, he played with the Quebec provincial U17 team. He also played in the 2019 Ontario-vs-Quebec CPL U-21 showcase. He attended post-secondary at Champlain College Saint-Lambert, playing for the men's soccer team.

== Club career ==
In 2021, he played for CS St-Hubert in the Première ligue de soccer du Québec, making two appearances, while primarily playing with the Reserve and U21 teams.

In February 2022, he signed a two-year contract with a club option for 2024 with Canadian Premier League club Atlético Ottawa. He made his debut on April 16, against HFX Wanderers FC. In April 2024, he signed an extension for the 2024 season, with an option for 2025.

== Personal life ==
Roy was born in Quebec to a Canadian father and Haitian mother. His sister, Félicia Roy, is also a professional soccer player.

== Career statistics ==
As of September 23, 2025

Appearances and goals by club, season and competition
Club	Season	League			Playoffs		Domestic cup		Other		Total	
Club	Season	Division	Apps	Goals	Apps	Goals	Apps	Goals	Apps	Goals	Apps	Goals
CS St-Hubert	2021	Première ligue de soccer du Québec	2	0	–		–		–		2	0
Atlético Ottawa	2022	Canadian Premier League	13	0	1	0	0	0	–		14	0
Atlético Ottawa	2023	Canadian Premier League	3	0	–		0	0	–		3	0
Atlético Ottawa	2024	Canadian Premier League	8	0	0	0	0	0	–		8	0
Atlético Ottawa	Total		24	0	1	0	0	0	0	0	25	0
CS St-Hubert	2025	Ligue1 Québec	17	2	–		–		0	0	17	2
Career total			43	2	1	0	0	0	0	0	44	2

== Honours ==
=== Atlético Ottawa ===
- Canadian Premier League
  - Regular Season: 2022
