= Gabriel Antinoro =

Brazilian footballer (born 2004)

Personal information
- Full name: Gabriel Mendes Antinoro
- Date of birth: April 24, 2004 (age 22)
- Place of birth: Brasília, Brazil
- Height: 1.75 m (5 ft 9 in)
- Position: Midfielder

Team information
- Current team: Atlético Ottawa
- Number: 11

Youth career
- 2017: CS Mont-Royal Outremont
- 2018–2023: CF Montréal
- 2022: → Bologna (loan)

Senior career*
| Years | Team | Apps | (Gls) |
| 2022 | CF Montréal U23 | 20 | (4) |
| 2023– | Atlético Ottawa | 70 | (6) |
- * Club domestic league appearances and goals as of October 28, 2025

Gabriel Mendes Antinoro (born April 24, 2004) is a Brazilian professional footballer who plays as a midfielder for Atlético Ottawa in the Canadian Premier League.

== Early life ==
Born in Brazil, Antinoro moved to Canada at age 12. After attending a training session with the ARS Lac Saint-Louis, he joined CS Mont-Royal Outremont, where he played for a season, before joining the CF Montréal Academy. In December 2021, he received a scholarship from the Fédération de l’athlète d’excellence du Québec for his academic and athletic excellence. In March 2022, he was loaned to the youth side of Italian club Bologna to participate in the Torneo di Viareggio.

== Club career ==
In 2022, he played with CF Montréal U23 in the Première ligue de soccer du Québec. In 2022 and 2023, he participated in the pre-season training camp with the CF Montréal first team.

In February 2023, he signed a two-year professional contract with Canadian Premier League club Atlético Ottawa. He made his professional debut on April 15, 2023, against the HFX Wanderers. On June 25, 2023, he scored his first professional goal, scoring 22 seconds into the match against Forge FC, which was the second-fastest goal (by milliseconds) in league history. In December 2024, he signed a three year extension through 2027. Ahead of the 2025 season, he went on a training stint with their affiliate club in Mexico, Atlético San Luis. During the 2025 season, he transitioned from his regular midfield role to playing wingback. Antinoro was part of the squad which won Ottawa's first CPL title on November 9, 2025.

== Career statistics ==
As of November 9, 2025

Appearances and goals by club, season and competition
| Club | Season | League | | | Playoffs | | Domestic cup | | Total | |
| Club | Season | Division | Apps | Goals | Apps | Goals | Apps | Goals | Apps | Goals |
|---|---|---|---|---|---|---|---|---|---|---|
| CF Montréal U23 | 2022 | Première ligue de soccer du Québec | 20 | 4 | – | | – | | 20 | 4 |
| Atlético Ottawa | 2023 | Canadian Premier League | 23 | 2 | — | | 1 | 0 | 24 | 2 |
| Atlético Ottawa | 2024 | Canadian Premier League | 19 | 1 | 0 | 0 | 3 | 0 | 22 | 1 |
| Atlético Ottawa | 2024 | Canadian Premier League | 28 | 3 | 2 | 1 | 5 | 0 | 35 | 4 |
| Atlético Ottawa | Total | | 70 | 6 | 2 | 1 | 9 | 0 | 81 | 7 |
| Career total | | | 90 | 10 | 2 | 1 | 5 | 0 | 101 | 11 |

== Honours ==
Atlético Ottawa

- Canadian Premier League: 2025
