= Jesús del Amo =

Spanish footballer (born 1999)

Personal information
- Full name: Jesús del Amo Castellano
- Date of birth: 25 May 1999 (age 27)
- Place of birth: Pulianas, Spain
- Height: 1.85 m (6 ft 1 in)
- Position: Defender

Team information
- Current team: Ávila
- Number: 4

Youth career
- Céltic Alevín
- Granada
- Barcelona
- Villarreal

Senior career*
Years	Team	Apps	(Gls)
2018	Roda	0	(0)
2019–2020	Huétor Vega	27	(2)
2020–2021	Calahorra B	26	(4)
2021–2022	Atlético Mancha Real	16	(0)
2022	Rodos	0	(0)
2022	Asteras Vlachioti	1	(0)
2022–2023	Jaén	31	(0)
2023–2024	Real Avilés	30	(0)
2024	Atlético Ottawa	5	(0)
2025	Tudelano	15	(0)
2025–2026	Jaén	9	(0)
2026–	Ávila	15	(0)
- * Club domestic league appearances and goals as of 7 May 2026

Jesús del Amo Castellano (born 25 May 1999) is a Spanish professional footballer who plays for Segunda Federación club Ávila.

== Early life ==
He began playing youth football with his hometown team, Céltic Alevín, at age six, playing there for six years before joining the youth system of Granada. Afterwards, he joined the Barcelona and Villarreal youth systems.

== Club career ==
He began his senior career in 2018 with Roda.

In the summer of 2019, he joined Huétor Vega. After the 2019-20 season, he departed the club.

In October 2020, he signed with Calahorra B.

In July 2021, he signed with Atlético Mancha Real. On 28 January 2022, he departed the club.

In late January 2022, he signed with Rodos in the Super League Greece 2. However, a few weeks later on 19 February, he moved on to Asteras Vlachioti in the same division.

In July 2022, del Amo signed with Real Jaén. He started every match for the club that season, except for one match in which he was suspended due to yellow card accumulation.

In July 2023, he joined Real Avilés in the Segunda Federación on a one-year contract.

In August 2024, he signed with Canadian Premier League club Atlético Ottawa. He made his debut for the club on 15 September in a substitute appearance against Cavalry FC.

In January 2025, he signed with Tudelano in the Segunda Federación.

In July 2025, he signed with his former club Real Jaén in the Segunda Federación.
