= Ilias Iliadis (footballer) =

Greek footballer (born 2001)

Personal information
- Date of birth: 21 March 2001 (age 25)
- Place of birth: Toronto, Ontario, Canada
- Height: 1.81 m (5 ft 11 in)
- Position: Midfielder

Team information
- Current team: Anagennisi Karditsa
- Number: 8

Youth career
- Scarborough Olympic Flame SC
- Serbian White Eagles
- 2015–2021: Panathinaikos

Senior career*
Years	Team	Apps	(Gls)
2021–2022	Panathinaikos B	34	(2)
2023–2024	CF Montréal	6	(0)
2023	→ CF Montréal U23 (loan)	4	(2)
2023	→ Atlético Ottawa (loan)	12	(1)
2024	→ CF Montréal U23 (loan)	1	(0)
2024	→ Atlético Ottawa (loan)	10	(2)
2025	Pirin Blagoevgrad	13	(2)
2025	Montana	18	(0)
2026–	Anagennisi Karditsa	0	(0)

International career^{‡}
2018	Greece U17	2	(0)
- * Club domestic league appearances and goals as of 5 August 2026 ‡ National team caps and goals as of 8 August 2024

Ilias Iliadis (Greek: Ηλίας Ηλιάδης; born 21 March 2001) is a professional footballer who plays as a midfielder who plays for Super League Greece 2 club Anagennisi Karditsa. Born in Canada, he has represented Greece at youth international level.

== Early life ==
He played youth soccer with Scarborough Olympic Flame SC. He also played youth soccer with the Serbian White Eagles. After attending an Arsenal academy camp in Greece, he joined the Panathinaikos Academy in January 2025, after having trials with Olympiacos, AEK Athens, and Panathinaikos. In October 2018, he signed a professional contract with the club.

== Club career ==
In August 2021, he joined Panathinaikos B in the Super League Greece 2 ahead of their inaugural season, after extending his contract with the club for two more seasons. He made his professional debut on November 7 against Kifisia. In December 2022, he requested to terminate his contract, in order to return to Canada, after having spent the previous eight years in Greece.

In January 2023, Major League Soccer side CF Montréal announced they had signed Iliadis to a two-year contract, with options for 2025 and 2026. He made his debut in a substitute appearance on March 4 against Austin FC. In July 2023, he was loaned to Atlético Ottawa of the Canadian Premier League. He made his debut on July 29 against Cavalry FC. After primarily playing right-back with Montreal in limited appearances, he was able to play his natural midfield role with Ottawa during his loan spell, forming a strong partnership with Spanish veteran player Alberto Zapater. He scored his first CPL goal in the season finale on October 7, 2023, in a 1–0 victory over Forge FC. After returning to Montreal for the beginning of the 2024 season, he re-joined Atlético Ottawa on loan in August 2024, for the remainder of the year. He made his first appearance in his second stint with the club on August 10 against Forge FC. On 17 August 2024, he scored an Olympico goal in a 3–0 victory over Pacific FC. On 31 August, he scored a second Olympico, in a 1–0 victory over Vancouver FC.

In March 2025, he signed with Pirin Blagoevgrad in the Bulgarian second tier.

In June 2025, he signed with Bulgarian First Professional Football League club Montana. In January 2026, it was announced he had departed the club at the end of 2025 by mutual consent.

In August 2026, he signed with Super League Greece 2 side Anagennisi Karditsa.

== International career ==
Eligible for Canada and Greece, Iliadis played two matches with the Greece U17 team in 2018.

== Personal life ==
Iliadis has a younger brother, Costa Iliadis, who is also a soccer player.

== Career statistics ==
As of December 31, 2025

Club	Season	League			Playoffs		National Cup		Continental		Other		Total	
Club	Season	Division	Apps	Goals	Apps	Goals	Apps	Goals	Apps	Goals	Apps	Goals	Apps	Goals
Panathinaikos B	2021–22	Super League Greece 2	29	1	—		—		—		—		29	1
Panathinaikos B	2022–23	Super League Greece 2	5	1	—		—		—		—		5	1
Panathinaikos B	Total		34	2	0	0	0	0	0	0	0	0	34	2
CF Montréal	2023	Major League Soccer	6	0	0	0	1	0	—		0	0	7	0
CF Montréal U23 (loan)	2023	Ligue1 Québec	4	2	—		—		—		0	0	4	2
Atlético Ottawa (loan)	2023	Canadian Premier League	12	1	—		0	0	—		—		12	1
CF Montréal U23 (loan)	2024	Ligue1 Québec	1	0	—		—		—		0	0	1	0
Atlético Ottawa (loan)	2024	Canadian Premier League	10	2	1	0	0	0	—		—		11	2
Pirin Blagoevgrad	2024–25	Second Professional League	13	2	—		0	0	—		1 (Note: Appearance(s) in the Promotion play-offs)	0	14	2
Montana	2025–26	First Professional League	18	0	—		1	0	—		—		19	0
Career total			98	9	1	0	2	0	0	0	0	0	102	9
