= Aboubakary Sacko =

French footballer (born 2003)

Personal information
- Date of birth: 31 January 2003 (age 23)
- Place of birth: Paris, France
- Height: 5 ft 7 in (1.70 m)
- Position: Midfielder

Youth career
- RC Arpajonnais
- CS Bretigny
- FC Fleury 91
- 2016–2023: Le Havre

Senior career*
Years	Team	Apps	(Gls)
2021–2023	Le Havre II	11	(0)
2023–2024	Atlético Ottawa	10	(0)
- * Club domestic league appearances and goals as of 19 July 2024

Aboubakary Sacko (born 31 January 2003) is a French professional footballer.

== Early life ==
Born in France, Sako is of Malian heritage, holding both nationalities. He began playing youth football at the age of five with RC Arpajonnais. Afterwards, he played for CS Brétigny and FC Fleury 91. In 2016, Sacko joined the youth system of French club Le Havre, joining on a five year developmental contract. In 2019, he was honoured as one of their top three U17 players.

== Club career ==
In 2021, he began playing at the senior level with Le Havre II in the fifth tier Championnat National 3.

In March 2023, he signed a two-year contract with Canadian Premier League club Atlético Ottawa, which was his first professional contract. In July 2024, he agreed to terminate his contract with the club by mutual consent.

== Career statistics ==
As of 25 May 2024

Appearances and goals by club, season and competition
Club	Season	League			Playoffs		National cup		Continental		Total	
Club	Season	Division	Apps	Goals	Apps	Goals	Apps	Goals	Apps	Goals	Apps	Goals
Le Havre II	2021–22	Championnat National 3	6	0	–		–		–		6	0
Le Havre II	2022–23	Championnat National 3	5	0	–		–		–		5	0
Le Havre II	Total		11	0	0	0	0	0	0	0	11	0
Atlético Ottawa	2023	Canadian Premier League	9	0	—		1	0	–		10	0
Atlético Ottawa	2024	Canadian Premier League	1	0	0	0	1	0	–		2	0
Atlético Ottawa	Total		10	0	0	0	2	0	0	0	12	0
Career total			21	0	0	0	2	0	0	0	23	0
