= Rayane Yesli =

Algerian footballer (born 1999)

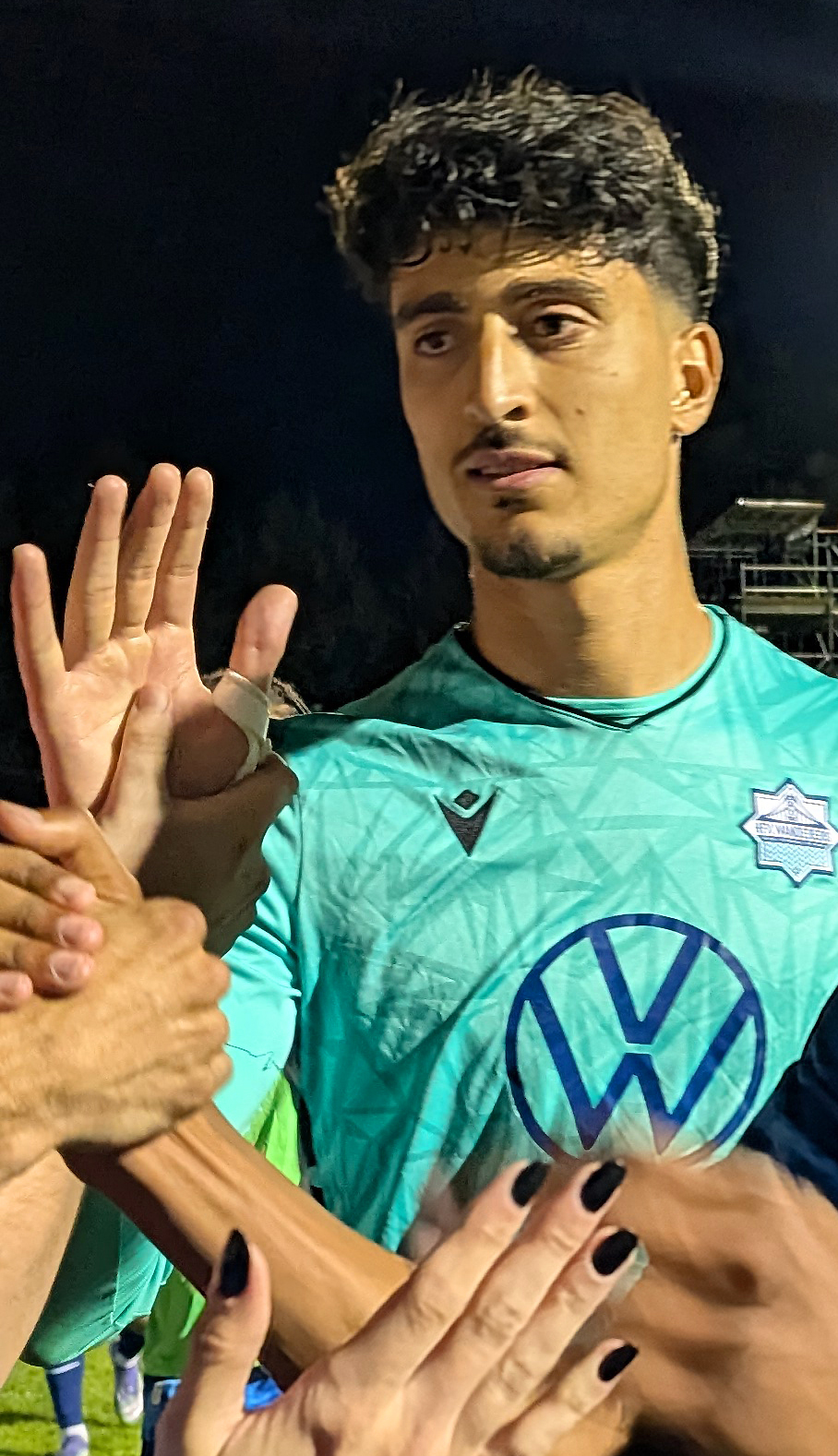
- Yesli in 2025 with HFX Wanderers FC

Personal information
- Full name: Yuba-Rayane Yesli
- Date of birth: 12 October 1999 (age 27)
- Place of birth: Tizi Ouzou, Algeria
- Height: 2.01 m (6 ft 7 in)
- Position: Goalkeeper

Team information
- Current team: Olympique Akbou
- Number: 1

Youth career
- CS Dollard
- Notre-Dame-de-Grâce SA
- Panellinios St Michel FC
- Montreal Impact
- 2018: Vibonese

College career
Years	Team	Apps	(Gls)
2020	Montreal Carabins		

Senior career*
Years	Team	Apps	(Gls)
2018	Vibonese	0	(0)
2019–2020	CS Fabrose	14	(0)
2021	AS Blainville	4	(0)
2022–2023	Valour FC	35	(0)
2024	Atlético Ottawa	8	(0)
2025	HFX Wanderers	27	(0)
2026–	Olympique Akbou	12	(0)

International career^{‡}
2025–	Algeria A'	2	(0)
- * Club domestic league appearances and goals as of 6 June 2026 ‡ National team caps and goals as of November 17, 2025

Yuba-Rayane Yesli (Arabic: يسلي ريان; born 12 October 1999) is an Algerian professional footballer who plays as a goalkeeper who plays for Olympique Akbou in the Algerian Ligue Professionnelle 1.

== Early life ==
Born in Tizi Ouzou, Algeria, Yesli moved to Montreal, Canada, at the age of two. Yesli played youth soccer with CS Dollard, Notre-Dame-de-Grâce SA, and Panellinios St Michel FC. Afterwards, he was part of the Montreal Impact Academy.

== Club career ==
In January 2018, Yesli joined U.S. Vibonese Calcio in the Italian Serie D, where they won promotion to the Serie C. He re-signed for the 2018–19 season.

In 2019 and 2020, he played with CS Fabrose in the Première Ligue de soccer du Québec, winning the 2019 Coupe PLSQ. He decided to attend the Université de Montréal and play for the Carabins soccer team in 2020, however the playing season was cancelled due to the COVID-19 pandemic.

He was selected third overall by Valour FC of the Canadian Premier League in the 2021 CPL-U Sports Draft, but did not ultimately sign with them for the 2021 season. However, he did serve as the league's emergency goalkeeper during the league's initial season which took place in a bubble, available to all team's on a short-term loan, in case of an injury to a team's goalkeepers as replacements were not available due to the bubble format, although he was not ultimately needed as a replacement. Afterwards, he trained with Major League Soccer club CF Montréal.

He then joined AS Blainville in the PLSQ for the 2021 season. He made his Canadian Championship debut on 17 August 2021 against Canadian Premier League side HFX Wanderers FC in a 2–1 loss.

In January 2022, he signed with Valour FC for the 2022 season. He made his debut for the club on 11 May in a Canadian Championship match against MLS club Vancouver Whitecaps FC. He made his league debut on 1 June in a 1–0 loss to Atlético Ottawa. He earned his first victory and clean sheet on 3 August, in his second league start, in a 2–0 victory over Cavalry FC. In January 2023, he went on a training sting with French Ligue 1 club AC Ajaccio, first joining the reserves, before joining the first team for training. He was named the CPL Goalkeeper of the Month for June 2023. After leading the league with 81 saves, at the end of the 2023 season, he was nominated for the CPL Golden Glove award, for the league's top goalkeeper.

In February 2024, he moved to Atlético Ottawa in an intra-league transfer, with Noah Verhoeven moving to Valour on a one-year loan in exchange. Yesli signed a one-year contract with an option for 2025 with Ottawa. After serving as the starter for Valour the previous season, he became part of a tandem rotation with Nathan Ingham in Ottawa. He made his first start for the club on 27 April against the HFX Wanderers.

In January 2025, Yesli signed with the HFX Wanderers for the 2025 season with an option for 2026. In April 2025, Yesli was named the Canadian Premier League's Goalkeeper of the Month.

In January 2026, Yesli signed with Olympique Akbou in the Algerian Ligue Professionnelle 1. In July 2026, he extended his contract, through the summer of 2027.

== International career ==
Born in Algeria and raised in Canada, Yesli is eligible to represent both Algeria and Canada at international level.

In June 2025, Yesli stated that he was interested in representing Algeria at international level if called. In October 2025, he was called up to the Algeria A' national team, their secondary national team that usually calls up only domestic league players, for a pair of friendlies against Palestine. In November 2025, he was again called up to the side. Later in November, he was called up to the Algeria national team for the 2025 FIFA Arab Cup.

== Personal life ==
Born in Algeria, Yesli moved to Canada at a young age and holds dual Algerian and Canadian nationality.

== Career statistics ==
As of 27 October 2025

Appearances and goals by club, season and competition
Club	Season	League			Playoffs		National cup		League cup		Total	
Club	Season	Division	Apps	Goals	Apps	Goals	Apps	Goals	Apps	Goals	Apps	Goals
Vibonese	2017–18	Serie D	0	0	—		0	0	—		0	0
Vibonese	2018–19	Serie C	0	0	—		0	0	—		0	0
CS Fabrose	2019	Première Ligue de soccer du Québec	8	0	—		—		4	0	12	0
CS Fabrose	2020	Première Ligue de soccer du Québec	6	0	—		—		—		6	0
CS Fabrose	Total		14	0	0	0	0	0	4	0	18	0
AS Blainville	2021	Première Ligue de soccer du Québec	4	0	—		1	0	—		5	0
Valour FC	2022	Canadian Premier League	9	0	—		1	0	—		10	0
Valour FC	2023	Canadian Premier League	26	0	—		1	0	—		27	0
Valour FC	Total		35	0	0	0	2	0	0	0	37	0
Atlético Ottawa	2024	Canadian Premier League	8	0	0	0	3	0	—		11	0
HFX Wanderers	2025	Canadian Premier League	27	0	1	0	1	0	—		29	0
Career total			88	0	1	0	6	0	4	0	99	0
