= Rubén del Campo =

Swiss footballer (born 2000)

Personal information
- Full name: Rubén del Campo Ferreira
- Date of birth: 22 February 2000 (age 26)
- Place of birth: Fribourg, Switzerland
- Height: 1.85 m (6 ft 1 in)
- Position: Forward

Team information
- Current team: Atlético Morelia
- Number: 9

Youth career
- 2008–2010: Fribourg
- 2010–2011: Schoenberg
- 2011–2011: Düdingen
- 2012–2015: Fribourg
- 2015–2017: Young Boys
- 2018–2020: Atlético Madrid
- 2020: Famalicão

Senior career*
Years	Team	Apps	(Gls)
2019–2020	Atlético Madrid B	1	(0)
2020–2022	Famalicão	6	(0)
2021	→ Numancia (loan)	12	(0)
2021–2022	→ Melilla (loan)	32	(10)
2022–2023	San Fernando	29	(4)
2023–2024	Atlético Ottawa	46	(12)
2025	UCAM Murcia	18	(8)
2025–	Atlético Morelia	42	(18)

International career^{‡}
2016	Switzerland U16	2	(1)
2016–2017	Switzerland U17	12	(4)
2017–2018	Switzerland U18	3	(1)
2018–2019	Switzerland U19	8	(0)
2019	Switzerland U20	1	(0)
- * Club domestic league appearances and goals as of 21 September 2026 ‡ National team caps and goals as of 31 December 2019

Rubén del Campo Ferreira (born 22 February 2000) is a Swiss professional footballer who plays as a forward for Atlético Morelia in the Liga de Expansión MX.

== Early life ==
Del Campo played youth football with Saint-Léonard, Schoenberg, Guin and Young Boys.

In 2018, he joined the Atlético Madrid youth system, having agreed to join in the summer of 2017, however, a FIFA sanction on Atlético prevented him from joining until January 2018. With Atlético, he played in the UEFA Youth League.

== Club career ==
In 2019, he made his debut with Atlético Madrid B in the third tier Segunda División B.

In January 2020, del Campo joined Portuguese club Famalicão in the Primeira Liga. Upon his arrival, it was announced he would begin his time at the club with the U23 team. At the end of January 2021, he went on loan with Numancia in the Spanish third tier Segunda División B, where he scored three goals in twelve matches. In August 2021, he announced his departure from Familiacão. He subsequently joined Melilla in the Spanish fourth tier Segunda División RFEF on loan until the end of his contract. On 30 January 2022, he scored a hat trick against Marchamalo. He finished as the team's top scorer that season with ten goals.

In July 2022, he signed with San Fernando CD in the third tier Primera Federación. On June 14, 2023, he terminated his contract with the club by mutual consent. In May, he tied a league record by scoring in five consecutive matches, and earned the league's Player of the Month honour for May.

In late June 2023, he signed with Atlético Ottawa of the Canadian Premier League through the end of the 2024 season. He scored his first goal for the club on 27 April 2024, in a victory over the HFX Wanderers. In the 2024 season, he scored goals in five consecutive matches from the third to seventh matchdays. At the end of the 2024 season, he departed the club.

On January 21, 2025, Del Campo returned to Spain to sign with UCAM Murcia in the Segunda Federación.

In July 2025, he joined Mexican club Atlético Morelia in the Liga de Expansión MX. On 30 August 2025, he scored his first goal, in a 3-0 victory over Mineros de Zacatecas.

== International career ==
Born in Switzerland, del Campo also has Spanish citizenship and is eligible to represent both national teams.

He has represented Switzerland at various youth levels, including at the 2018 UEFA European Under-19 Championship qualification.

== Career statistics ==
As of 3 November 2024

Club statistics
Club	Season	League			National Cup		Other		Total	
Club	Season	Division	Apps	Goals	Apps	Goals	Apps	Goals	Apps	Goals
Atlético Madrid B	2019-20	Segunda División B	1	0	—		—		1	0
Famalicão	2019-20	Primeira Liga	1	0	0	0	0	0	1	0
Famalicão	2020-21	Primeira Liga	5	0	0	0	0	0	5	0
Famalicão	Total		6	0	0	0	0	0	6	0
Numancia (loan)	2020-21	Segunda División B	12	0	0	0	—		12	0
Melilla (loan)	2021-22	Segunda Federación	32	10	—		—		32	10
San Fernando	2022-23	Primera Federación	29	4	—		—		29	4
Atlético Ottawa	2023	Canadian Premier League	16	0	0	0	—		16	0
Atlético Ottawa	2024	Canadian Premier League	28	11	3	2	2	1	33	14
Atlético Ottawa	Total		44	11	3	2	2	1	49	14
Career total			124	25	3	2	2	1	129	28
