= Noah Verhoeven =

Canadian soccer player (born 1999)

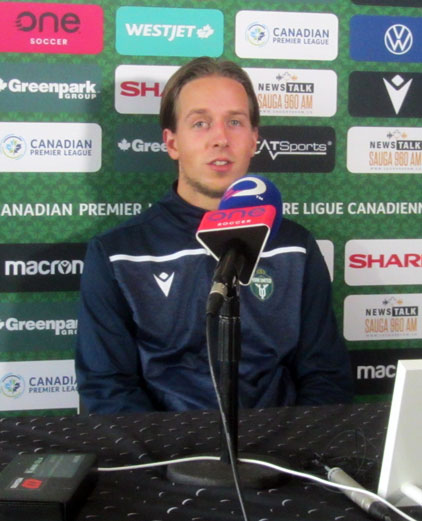
- Verhoeven in 2021

Personal information
- Full name: Noah Timothy Verhoeven
- Date of birth: June 15, 1999 (age 27)
- Place of birth: Surrey, British Columbia, Canada
- Height: 1.75 m (5 ft 9 in)
- Positions: Midfielder; forward

Team information
- Current team: Makedonikos
- Number: 17

Youth career
- 2007–2011: Surrey United SC
- 2007–2010: Guru Nanak SC
- 2011–2017: Vancouver Whitecaps FC

Senior career*
Years	Team	Apps	(Gls)
2017	Whitecaps FC 2	1	(0)
2018	Fresno FC	23	(0)
2019–2020	Pacific FC	27	(0)
2021–2022	York United	51	(0)
2023–2025	Atlético Ottawa	30	(1)
2024	→ Valour FC (loan)	20	(0)
2026–	Makedonikos	9	(0)

International career^{‡}
2018	Canada U20	5	(0)
2018	Canada U21	3	(1)
- * Club domestic league appearances and goals as of April 20, 2026 ‡ National team caps and goals as of November 10, 2018

Noah Timothy Verhoeven (born June 15, 1999) is a Canadian professional soccer player who plays for Makedonikos in the Super League Greece 2.

== Early life ==
Verhoeven played youth soccer with Surrey United SC from 2007 to 2011, with whom he won a district championship in 2009-10 and served as team camp. In 2009 and 2010, he also played with Guru Nanak Sporting Club and from 2007 to 2010, he trained with the Total Soccer Systems (TSS) Academy. From 2009 to 2011, Verhoeven was a member of Whitecaps FC Prospects program and joined the official Whitecaps FC Academy in September 2011.

== Club career ==
In October 2017, he joined USL side Whitecaps FC 2, as an academy callup. He made his professional debut on October 7, 2017, in a 1–1 draw against Real Monarchs SLC, coming on as a substitute in the 74th minute.

In March 2018, he joined Fresno FC in the USL, who became the Whitecaps USL affiliate following the disbanding of the Whitecaps second team, signing his first professional contract. Later that month, he made his debut for the team. On April 18, 2018, he recorded his first assist in a 2–2 draw against the Tulsa Roughnecks.

In January 2019, he signed with Pacific FC of the Canadian Premier League. He made his debut in the club's inaugural match on April 28, recording an assist against HFX Wanderers FC off of a corner kick. In early May 2019, he was named the CPL U23 Player of the Week. He was named to the CPL Spring season Best XI, after the first part of the 2019 season. In December 2019, he re-signed with the club for the 2020 season.

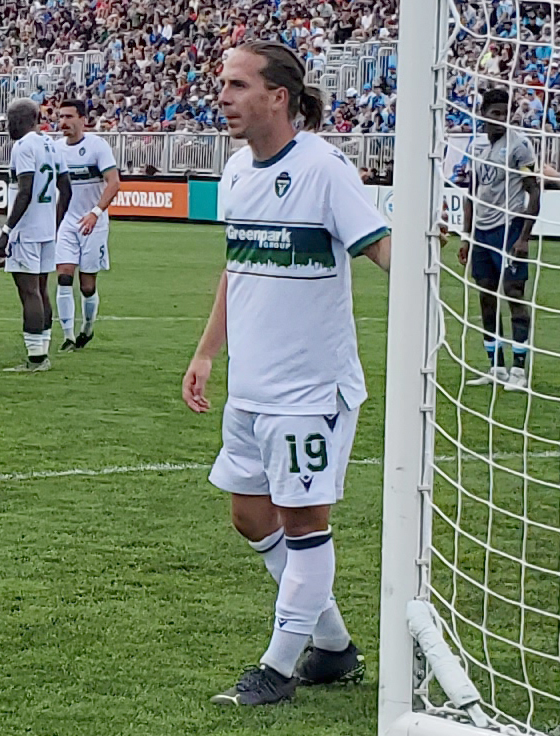
Verhoeven with York United in 2022

In February 2021. he joined York United in the Canadian Premier League. He signed a two-year contract with a club option for a third season. In December 2022, Verhoeven's contract option was not picked up by York, ending his time at the club.

In February 2023, he joined Atlético Ottawa on a two-year contract. In February 2024, he extended his contract with Ottawa through the 2025 season and was subsequently loaned to Valour FC for the 2024 season, in a move with Rayane Yesli heading on Ottawa on a permanent deal.

In January 2026, he signed with Super League Greece 2 club Makedonikos. On May 31, 2026, he signed an extension with the club.

== International career ==
Verhoeven is a dual citizen of Canada and the United States, and has Dutch ancestry.

In November 2013, he made his debut in the Canadian youth program at an identification camp for the Canada U15 team. In September 2014, he was named to an official camp for the Canada U15s.

In January 2017, Verhoeven was called up to a camp for the United States U18 team. In 2018, he was called up to the United States U20 team.

In May 2018, he was named to the Canada U21 squad for the 2018 Toulon Tournament. He made his debut on May 28 against Portugal U21, coming on as a substitute. On May 31, he scored his first goal, helping Canada to a 1–0 victory over . He was then named to the Canadian U20 team for the 2018 CONCACAF U-20 Championship and was named team captain. He was selected was selected to represented Canada U23 at the 2020 CONCACAF Men's Olympic Qualifying Championship, but the tournament was postponed until 2021.

In June 2019, he was called up to train with the Canada senior team for a training camp.
