= Liberman Torres =

Ecuadorian footballer (born 2002)

Personal information
- Full name: Liberman Bryan Torres Nazareno
- Date of birth: 16 May 2002 (age 24)
- Place of birth: Shushufindi, Ecuador
- Height: 1.86 m (6 ft 1 in)
- Position: Defensive midfielder

Team information
- Current team: Manta
- Number: 6

Youth career
- 2016: Atlético Santo Domingo
- 2016–2020: Independiente del Valle

Senior career*
Years	Team	Apps	(Gls)
2020–2022	Independiente Juniors	19	(0)
2020	Independiente del Valle	1	(0)
2022–2025	Villarreal B	4	(0)
2023–2024	→ Recreativo (loan)	2	(0)
2024	→ Atlético Ottawa (loan)	15	(1)
2025–	Manta	4	(0)
- * Club domestic league appearances and goals as of 3 November 2024

Liberman Bryan Torres Nazareno (born 16 May 2002) is an Ecuadorian footballer who plays as a defensive midfielder for Ecuadorian Serie A club Manta.

== Club career ==
=== Independiente del Valle ===
Born in Shushufindi, Torres joined Independiente del Valle's youth sides in 2016, from Atlético Santo Domingo. After already featuring with the reserve team of Independiente Juniors in the Serie B, he made his first team debut on 3 October 2020, coming on as a late substitute for Christian Ortiz in a 3–1 Serie A away win over Orense.

On 25 August 2022, Torres terminated his contract with del Valle.

=== Villarreal ===
On 26 August 2022, Villarreal announced the signing of Torres, with the player being initially assigned to the B-team in Segunda División. He made his debut for the B-side on 17 September, replacing Adrián de la Fuente in a 3–1 home win over CD Lugo.

On 17 August 2023, after featuring rarely, Torres moved to Primera Federación side Recreativo de Huelva on loan for the 2023–24 season.

In February 2024, he went on loan to Canadian Premier League club Atlético Ottawa.

=== Manta ===
In June 2025, Torres signed with Ecuadorian Serie A club Manta.
