= Aboubacar Sissoko =

Malian footballer (born 1995)

Personal information
- Date of birth: 9 October 1995 (age 31)
- Place of birth: Bamako, Mali
- Height: 1.83 m (6 ft 0 in)
- Position: Midfielder

Team information
- Current team: FC Supra du Québec
- Number: 33

Youth career
- CS Mont-Royal Outremont
- 2013–2014: CS Longueuil
- 2015: CS Mont-Royal Outremont

College career
Years	Team	Apps	(Gls)
2015–2019	Montreal Carabins		

Senior career*
Years	Team	Apps	(Gls)
2014	CS Longueuil	2	(0)
2017–2019	CS St-Hubert	33	(1)
2020	HFX Wanderers	9	(0)
2021	Indy Eleven	21	(0)
2022–2023	Forge FC	52	(6)
2024–2025	Atlético Ottawa	50	(4)
2026–	FC Supra du Québec	14	(1)

International career^{‡}
2014	Mali U20	2	(0)
- * Club domestic league appearances and goals as of 9 August 2026 ‡ National team caps and goals as of 15 August 2020

Aboubacar Sissoko (born 9 October 1995) is a Malian professional footballer who plays for FC Supra du Québec in the Canadian Premier League.

== Early life ==
Sissoko was born in Bamako, Mali and moved to Montreal, Quebec in 2006 when his father, a diplomat, was posted there.

He began playing youth soccer with CS Mont-Royal Outremont, later joining Longueuil. In 2015, he won the Silver Ball with the U21 team of CS Mont-Royal Outremont in the LSEQ U21 division. In 2016, he played at the senior amateur level in the LSEQ with CS Panellinios.

== University career ==
In 2015, he began attending the Université de Montréal, where he played for the Carabins men's soccer team, joining his brother who also played for the team. He was named the Carabins' Rookie of the Year in 2015. In 2017, he was named captain of the team.

He helped the Carabins win reach the national championship three consecutive seasons (2017 to 2019), helping them win their first national title in 2018, as well as silver medals in 2017 and 2019. He was an RSEQ First Team All-Star three times from 2017 to 2019, as well as a U Sports First Team All-Star in 2019. He was also named an RSEQ Indoor First-Team All-Star in 2017–18.

After the 2019 season, he won the Joe Johnson Memorial Trophy as the most outstanding U Sports men's soccer player, after having been named the RSEQ Player of the Year earlier. He was also named the Montreal Carabins Athlete of the Year, across all of their sports teams.

In June 2020, he was named the U Sports Athlete of the Year for 2019–20. He became the first Carabin to ever win the honour. As part of the award, he earned a $10,000 schaolarship.

== Club career ==
In 2014, he appeared with CS Longueuil in the Première ligue de soccer du Québec.

From 2017 to 2019, he played for CS St-Hubert in the Première ligue de soccer du Québec. In November 2018, at the 2018 CPL-U Sports Draft, Sissoko was selected 12th overall by Canadian Premier League club Forge FC. He attended pre-season with the club, but did not earn a contract. After leaving Forge, he returned to St-Hubert for another season in 2019, after which he departed the PLSQ club to begin his professional career.

In November 2019, he signed with HFX Wanderers FC of the Canadian Premier League, ahead of the 2020 season. In February 2020, after signing his contract, but before beginning the 2020 season, he went on trial with Major League Soccer club Vancouver Whitecaps FC. Originally, the trial was to last for three days, but it was continually extended, finally ending after six weeks, after which he returned to join the Wanderers. In his third match on 23 August, he earned Man of the Match honours against Cavalry FC. He helped the Wanderers reach the 2020 CPL Final, where they were defeated by Forge FC. He led the league with a 91% dribbling success rate that season. He was also named to the CanPL.ca 2020 Best XI.

In February 2021, he joined USL Championship club Indy Eleven.

In February 2022, he returned to the Canadian Premier League, signing with Forge FC. He made his debut for the club in a 2022 CONCACAF Champions League match against Cruz Azul on 16 February. He won the league title with Forge in 2022. In 2023, he again helped Forge win the league title, for the second consecutive season.

In February 2024, he signed with Atlético Ottawa on a two-year contract. On 13 April 2024, he made his debut in the season opener against York United FC.

In January 2026, he signed with FC Supra du Québec in the Canadian Premier League.

== International career ==
Sissoko represented the Mali U20 team at the 2015 African U-20 Championship qualification tournament in 2014. After returning to Canada following it, he was diagnosed with malaria and fell into a three-day coma.

== Personal ==
While representing the Mali U20 team, Sissoko, along with his mother and sister, paid for the construction of two water wells in an arid rural area of Mali and later formed the Macine Foundation (named in honour of his parents) with his sister and two brothers, as a water-supplying charity, and have built additional wells.

== Career statistics ==
As of 9 November 2025

Club	Season	League			Playoffs		Domestic Cup		League Cup		Continental		Total	
Club	Season	Division	Apps	Goals	Apps	Goals	Apps	Goals	Apps	Goals	Apps	Goals	Apps	Goals
CS Longueuil	2014	Première Ligue de soccer du Québec	2	0	—		—		0	0	—		2	0
CS St-Hubert	2017	Première Ligue de soccer du Québec	10	0	—		—		3	0	—		13	0
CS St-Hubert	2018	Première Ligue de soccer du Québec	11	0	—		—		1	0	—		12	0
CS St-Hubert	2019	Première Ligue de soccer du Québec	12	1	—		—		0	0	—		12	1
CS St-Hubert	Total		33	1	0	0	0	0	4	0	0	0	37	1
HFX Wanderers	2020	Canadian Premier League	9	0	1	0	—		—		—		10	0
Indy Eleven	2021	USL Championship	21	0	—		—		—		—		21	0
Forge FC	2022	Canadian Premier League	27	4	3	0	3 (Note: Includes appearance in the 2020 Canadian Championship final (played in 2022))	0	—		2 (Note: Appearances in CONCACAF Champions League)	0	35	4
Forge FC	2023	Canadian Premier League	25	2	2	0	3	0	—		—		30	2
Forge FC	Total		52	6	5	0	6	0	0	0	2	0	65	6
Atlético Ottawa	2024	Canadian Premier League	28	3	2	0	3	0	—		—		33	3
Atlético Ottawa	2025	Canadian Premier League	22	1	2	0	3	1	—		—		27	2
Atlético Ottawa	Total		50	4	4	0	6	1	0	0	0	0	60	5
Career total			167	11	10	0	12	1	4	0	2	0	195	12

== Honours ==
Atlético Ottawa

- Canadian Premier League: 2025

Forge FC

- Canadian Premier League: 2022, 2023
