= Macdonald Niba =

Cameroonian footballer (born 1994)

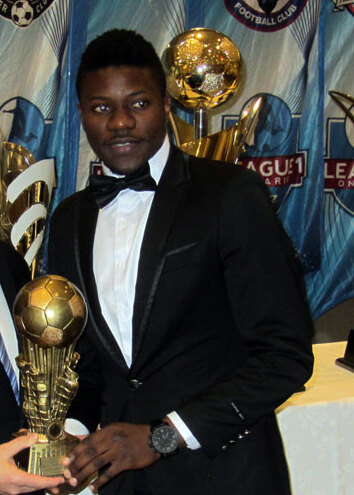
- Niba receives L1O Defender of the Year award in 2016

Personal information
- Full name: Macdonald Ngwa Niba
- Date of birth: 8 August 1994 (age 32)
- Place of birth: Buea, Cameroon
- Height: 1.85 m (6 ft 1 in)
- Position: Centre-back

College career
Years	Team	Apps	(Gls)
- University of Buea

Senior career*
Years	Team	Apps	(Gls)
2012–2014	Cinyodev FC		
2016	North Toronto Nitros	18	(7)
2017–2019	Nitra	52	(2)
2019–2020	Honvéd Budapest	8	(0)
2020–2021	Doxa Drama	5	(0)
2021	KuPS	5	(0)
2021	→ KuFu-98 (loan)	1	(0)
2022–2023	Atlético Ottawa	28	(0)
2024	Thunder Bay Chill	12	(0)
2024–2026	Doğan Türk Birliği		
2026–	St. Catharines Roma Wolves	1	(0)
- * Club domestic league appearances and goals as of 17 July 2026

Macdonald Ngwa Niba (born 8 August 1994) is a Cameroonian professional footballer who plays as a centre-back for St. Catharines Roma Wolves in the Ontario Premier League.

== Early life ==
In his native Cameroon, Niba attended the University of Buea, where he played for the school's football team, being named the team's best player in the 2013–14 season, and also played for Cinyodev FC.

== Club career ==
In 2016 season, he played for the North Toronto Nitros in the Canadian third tier League1 Ontario, making his debut on 30 April against Vaughan Azzurri. He scored his first goal on May 8, against Toronto Skillz FC. Over the course of the season, he played 18 league matches, scoring seven goals. That season, he was named a Mid-Season All-Star, was named to the year-end League1 Ontario All-Star Team and was also named Defender of the Year.

On 27 February 2017, Niba signed with Slovak 2. Liga club FC Nitra. On 22 July 2017 Niba made his Slovak First Football League debut against Žilina. In his first four matches, he was named man of the match three times, also earning Player Of The Week honours once and being named to the Team of the Week each time. That season he made eight appearances for Nitra, scoring two goals and helping the club earn promotion to the Slovak First Football League.

In 2019, he joined Hungarian club Budapest Honvéd FC. In 2020, he won the Hungarian Cup with Honved, entering the finals as a 95th-minute substitute. During his season with Honvéd, he dealt with some injuries, as well as the interruption of the season due to the COVID-19 pandemic.

In October 2020, he joined Doxa Drama F.C. in the Greek second tier.

In April 2021, he joined Finnish first tier side KuPS on a one-year contract until December 2021. In May, they won the 2021 Finnish Cup.

On 26 January 2022, Niba returned to Canada, signing a two-year contract with Canadian Premier League side Atlético Ottawa. Niba was released after his contract expired in the 2023 off-season.

In April 2024, he signed with USL League Two club Thunder Bay Chill.

In August 2014, he signed with Northern Cyprus club Doğan Türk Birliği in the KTFF Süper Lig on a two-year contract.

== International career ==
In 2017, he was named to the Cameroon U23 preliminary squad for the 2017 Islamic Solidarity Games, although he did not make the final roster.

== Career statistics ==
As of match played 19 July 2024

Appearances and goals by club, season and competition
Club	Season	League			National Cup		League Cup		Continental		Other		Total	
Club	Season	Division	Apps	Goals	Apps	Goals	Apps	Goals	Apps	Goals	Apps	Goals	Apps	Goals
North Toronto Nitros	2016	League1 Ontario	18	7	—		1	0	—		—		19	7
FC Nitra	2016-17	Slovak 2. Liga	8	2	0	0	—		—		—		8	2
FC Nitra	2017-18	Slovak Super Liga	26	0	2	0	—		—		—		28	0
FC Nitra	2018-19	Slovak Super Liga	18	0	3	0	—		—		—		21	0
FC Nitra	Total		52	2	5	0	0	0	0	0	0	0	57	2
Honvéd	2019-20	NB I	8	0	5	0	—		2 (Note: Appearance(s) in the UEFA Europa League)	0	—		13	0
Doxa Dramas	2020-21	Super League Greece 2	5	0	0	0	—		—		—		5	0
KuPS	2021	Veikkausliiga	5	0	1	0	—		4 (Note: Appearance(s) in the UEFA Conference League)	0	—		6	0
KuFu-98 (loan)	2021	Kakkonen	1	0	0	0	—		—		—		1	0
Atlético Ottawa	2022	Canadian Premier League	16	0	1	0	—		—		0 (Note: Appearance(s) in the Canadian Premier League playoffs)	0	17	0
Atlético Ottawa	2023	Canadian Premier League	12	0	1	0	—		—		—		13	0
Atlético Ottawa	Total		28	0	2	0	0	0	0	0	0	0	30	0
Thunder Bay Chill	2024	USL League Two	12	0	—		—		—		1 (Note: Appearance(s) in the USL2 playoffs)	0	13	0
Career total			129	2	13	0	1	0	6	0	1	0	150	9

== Honours ==
Individual

- League1 Ontario Defender of the Year: 2016
- League1 Ontario All-Star: 2016

Club

- Hungarian Cup: 2019–20
- Finnish Cup: 2021
- Canadian Premier League Regular Season: 2022
