= 2025 Forge FC season =

Forge FC
2025 season
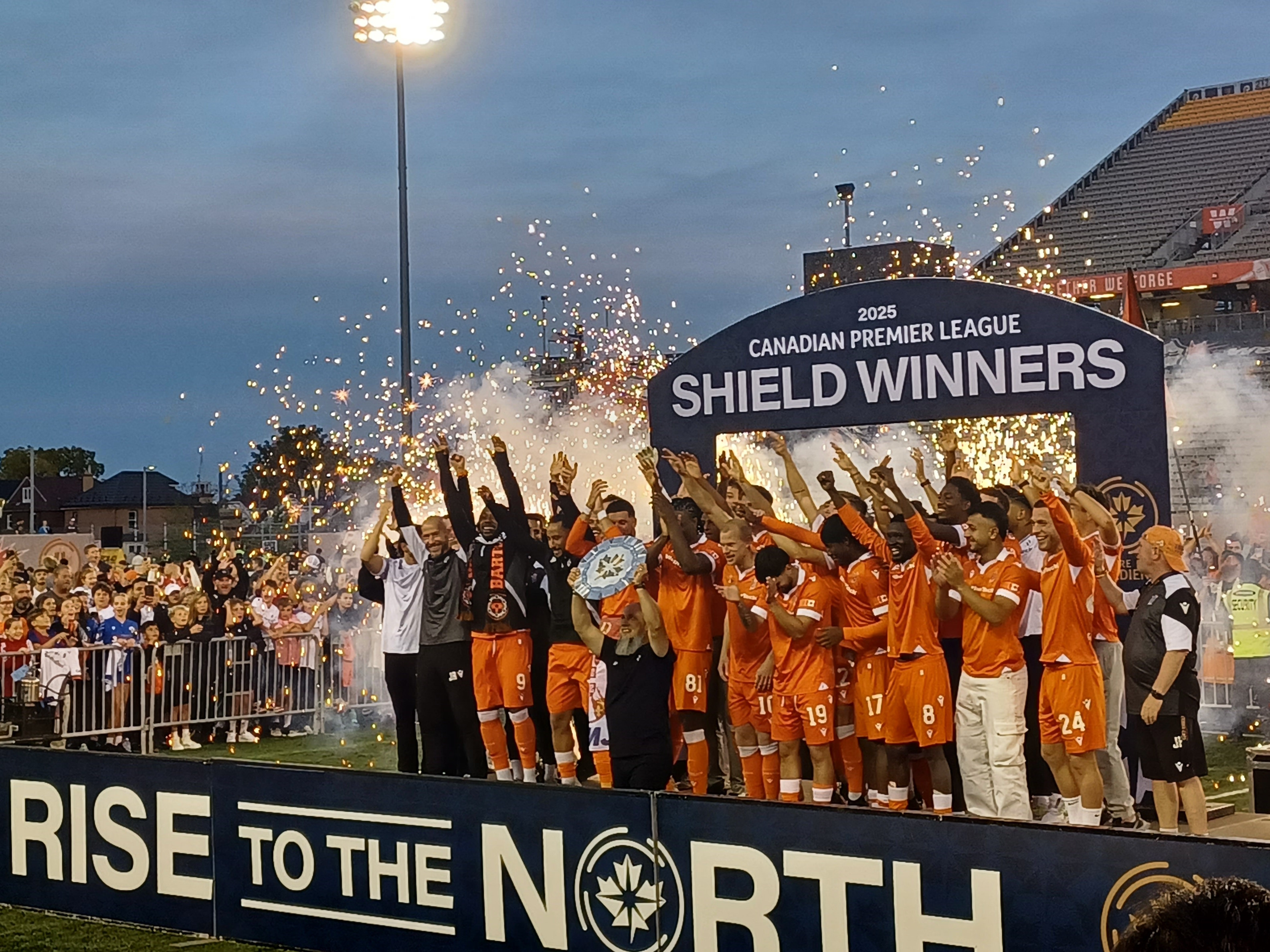
- Bobby Smyrniotis lifts the CPL Shield
- Chairman: Bob Young
- Head coach: Bobby Smyrniotis
- Stadium: Hamilton Stadium
- Canadian Premier League: 1st
- CPL playoffs: Semifinals
- Canadian Championship: Semifinals
- CONCACAF Champions Cup: Round one
- Top goalscorer: League: Brian Wright (12); All: Brian Wright (14)
- Highest home attendance: 17,971 vs. Atlético Ottawa (May 13, CPL)
- Lowest home attendance: 3,064 vs. CF Montréal (May 20, CC)
- Average home league attendance: 6,932
- Biggest win: 5–0 vs. Valour FC (Away, June 22, CPL); 5–0 vs. Valour FC (Home, August 2, CPL)
- Biggest defeat: 0–4 vs. Vancouver Whitecaps (Away, September 16, CC)
Home colours	Away colours

The 2025 Forge FC season was the seventh season in the history of Forge FC and the club's seventh season in the Canadian Premier League (CPL), the top flight in Canadian soccer. Forge were the defending CPL Shield winners, having finished first in the 2024 Canadian Premier League season.

In the CPL, Forge repeated as regular season winners to secure the club's third CPL Shield. The Hammers started the season 20 matches undefeated as part of a 24 match unbeaten run in all domestic competitions, both records for a CPL club. In the CPL playoffs, Forge failed to advance to the finals for the first time in its history, after losing against Atlético Ottawa and Cavalry FC in the Page playoff first and second semifinal matches, respectively.

In addition to the CPL, Forge competed in the Canadian Championship, where it advanced to the semifinal for the third consecutive year. Forge also played in the CONCACAF Champions Cup, where it faced Liga MX side Monterrey in the first round.

== Review ==
=== Background ===
Forge FC entered the 2025 Canadian Premier League season as the reigning regular season winners after having finished first and claiming the CPL Shield in the 2024 season. This was the club's second regular season title and sixth trophy in six years, continuing their dynasty. In the CPL playoffs, Forge advanced to the 2024 CPL final where they were defeated by rival side Cavalry FC, finishing as runner-up.

The Hammers also competed in the 2025 Canadian Championship, a domestic cup organized by the Canadian Soccer Association. In the 2024 edition, Forge defeated MLS side CF Montréal in the quarterfinal. They were knocked out in the semifinal by Toronto FC, losing on away goals after tying 2–2 on aggregate.

Forge qualified for the 2025 CONCACAF Champions Cup as 2024 CPL regular season winners. This was Forge's third appearance in the competition and second appearance in a row. In the 2024 edition, Forge faced Mexican side C.D. Guadalajara in round one, losing 5–2 on aggregate.

Head coach and sporting director Bobby Smyrniotis returned for his seventh season with the club after signing a four-year contract extension in 2023.

=== Preseason ===
On November 21, 2024, CF Montréal declined its 2025 contract option on Forge loanee Matteo Schiavoni, ending his time with the Hammers; Forge later confirmed this in a December roster update. On December 16, Dominic Samuel and Forge together announced that the defender was leaving the club following the expiry of his contract at the end of the year.

On December 12, 2024, Forge announced that Alexander Achinioti-Jönsson, Nana Ampomah, David Choinière, Elimane Cissé, Noah Jensen, and Khadim Kane all had guaranteed contracts through the 2025 season. The club later announced that it had triggered contract options for the 2025 season for Béni Badibanga, Christopher Kalongo, Jassem Koleilat, Malik Owolabi-Belewu, and Orlendis Benítez. Forge also triggered its 2025 loan option for Daniel Parra from C.F. Monterrey. Malcolm Duncan, Jordan Hamilton, Victor Klonaridis, Terran Campbell, Garven Metusala, and Sebastian Castello all departed the club.

Forge opened its preseason in Hamilton in early January before traveling to Cancun for two weeks of training. While there, the Hammers played friendlies against Liga Premier club Inter Playa del Carmen and MLS club Orlando City SC. Béni Badibanga was absent from the team during this period as he navigated a contract dispute.

=== CONCACAF Champions Cup ===
Forge drew Liga MX side C.F. Monterrey in round one of the CONCACAF Champions Cup. The match was noteworthy due to Monterrey's connection with York United FC, Forge's rival in the 905 Derby. It was set to pit Forge loanee Daniel Parra against his parent club, Monterrey; however, Parra transferred to Atlético Morelia just days before the tie's first leg.

Forge hosted Monterrey in the tie's first leg on February 5, looking to secure the club's first ever win in Champions Cup play. In freezing conditions producing slippery turf, Monterrey scored two second half goals while Forge failed to capitalize on their chances, resulting in a 2–0 win for Rayados. The Hammers were without Malik Owolabi-Belewu (personal reasons), Béni Badibanga (contract dispute), and Elimane Cissé (injury).

In the return leg a week later in Guadalupe, Nuevo León, Monterrey scored three unanswered goals to take a 3–0 win, eliminating Forge 5–0 on aggregate. Forge's best chance in the match came in the first half when Tristan Borges hit the crossbar, but the Hammers were ultimately unable to score. This was the third time Forge were eliminated in their opening Champions Cup tie.

=== Canadian Premier League ===

Starting XI for CPL home opener against Cavalry FC on April 5.

Forge opened its CPL Shield defence at home against reigning champions Cavalry FC on April 5 in a repeat of the 2024 CPL final. Babouli opened the scoring for Forge in the 58th minute and the Hammers survived a late onslaught from Cavalry following a sending off to Zayne Bruno to win 1–0.

For the second year in a row, Forge hosted a mid-week school day game. In the May 13 contest against Atlético Ottawa, Forge broke the CPL attendance record that had held since hosting the CPL inaugural match by welcoming a crowd of 17,971 in the stands. The match ended in a 2–2 draw.

Forge set a new record for the longest unbeaten run to start a CPL season at 10 matches on June 15 when they defeated Vancouver FC 2–0 at Willoughby Community Park. On July 18, Forge defeated Pacific FC 2–0 at home to go 15 matches undefeated to begin the CPL season, breaking the CPL record for the longest unbeaten run set by Forge in 2019. This also made Forge 18 matches undefeated in all competitions. By the time the streak ended on August 30, Forge had amassed an unbeaten run of 20 CPL matches and 24 matches across all competitions.

On the final day of the season, Forge defeated York United 3–0 to clinch first place in the regular season standings and repeat as CPL Shield winners. The team set a club record with 58 points, losing only two matches and going undefeated at home during the season.

==== CPL playoffs ====
On August 24, Forge became the first club to clinch a spot in the CPL Playoffs. They later secured the top playoff seed on October 18, the last day of the regular season.

Looking to win the first double in CPL history, Forge began the playoffs at home on October 26 against Atlético Ottawa in the Page playoff first semifinal with a chance to advance directly to the CPL final. After taking the lead in the 23rd minute with a goal by David Choinière, Forge gave up two unanswered goals to lose the match 2–1. Forge next hosted Cavalry in the Page playoff second semifinal on November 2 with another chance to qualify for the final. Cavalry won the match 1–0, eliminating Forge from the playoffs. The result made the 2025 CPL final the first in league history not to feature Forge.

=== Canadian Championship ===
Forge began its Canadian Championship campaign on May 7 with an all-CPL match at home in the preliminary round against HFX Wanderers FC. The match came only four days after the two teams played to a scoreless draw in Halifax in league play. Molham Babouli scored a brace and Forge benefitted from a Halifax own goal to defeat the Wanderers 3–1. The win advanced Forge to the quarterfinals and a matchup against CF Montréal.

On May 20, Forge hosted MLS side CF Montréal in Hamilton for the first leg of the quarterfinal tie. This was the fifth consecutive year these two teams faced each other in the Canadian Championship, with Forge having eliminated Montreal in the previous year's tournament. After Forge dominated the game's first half but were unable to take a lead, Brian Wright scored in the 78th-minute off of a long pass from Nana Ampomah to lift Forge to a 1–0 win. In the second leg on July 9, Borges and Forge captain Kyle Bekker scored three minutes apart in the second half to help Forge secure a 2–2 draw, advancing the Hammers to the tournament semifinals 3–2 on aggregate and eliminating The Impact in the Canadian Championship quarterfinals for the second consecutive year.

Forge faced Vancouver Whitecaps FC in the first leg of the semifinals in Hamilton on August 13. Nana Ampomah opened the scoring in the ninth minute and later assisted on a Brian Wright goal in the 34th minute as Forge took advantage of a pair of defensive mistakes by the Whitecaps in a 2–2 draw. The tie unraveled for Forge in the return leg in Vancouver on September 16 as the Whitecaps blanked the Hammers 4–0 to secure a 6–2 aggregate win, eliminating Forge from the Canadian Championship.

== Squad ==
As of November 2, 2025

No.	Player	Nationality	Position(s)	Date of birth (age)	Previous club	Notes
Goalkeepers
1	Jassem Koleilat	(Czech Republic)	GK	July 30, 1999 (aged 26)	(United States) Los Angeles FC 2	
29	Christopher Kalongo	(Canada)	GK	January 7, 2002 (aged 23)	(Canada) Sigma FC	
36	Dino Bontis	(Canada)	GK	August 3, 2004 (aged 21)	(Canada) Western Mustangs	U21
42	Emmanuel Marmolejo	(Canada)	GK	June 14, 2007 (aged 18)	(Canada) Sigma FC	U21, DEV
Defenders
3	Marko Jevremović	(Serbia)	DF	February 23, 1996 (aged 29)	(Greece) Athens Kallithea F.C.	INT
5	Daniel Nimick	(Canada)	DF	September 22, 2000 (aged 25)	(Canada) HFX Wanderers FC	
24	Rezart Rama	(Albania)	DF	December 4, 2000 (aged 24)	(Albania) KF Egnatia	INT
33	Oliver Clow	(Canada)	DF	May 5, 2007 (aged 18)	(Canada) Sigma FC	U21, DEV
81	Malik Owolabi-Belewu	(England)	DF	July 3, 2002 (aged 23)	(Italy) S.P.A.L.	
Midfielders
6	Ben Paton	(Canada)	MF	May 5, 2000 (aged 25)	(Scotland) Ross County	
8	Elimane Cissé	(Senegal)	MF	March 12, 1995 (aged 30)	(Senegal) Diambars FC	
10	Kyle Bekker	(Canada)	MF	September 2, 1990 (aged 35)	(United States) North Carolina FC	
13	Alexander Achinioti-Jönsson	(Sweden)	MF	April 17, 1996 (aged 29)	(Sweden) IFK Värnamo	
21	Alessandro Hojabrpour	(Canada)	MF	January 10, 2000 (aged 25)	(Canada) Pacific FC	
22	Noah Jensen	(Canada)	MF	July 20, 1999 (aged 26)	(United States) Oakland University	
23	Harry Paton	(Canada)	MF	May 23, 1998 (aged 27)	(Scotland) Motherwell F.C.	
28	Keito Lipovschek	(Canada)	MF	April 3, 2005 (aged 20)	(United Arab Emirates) Fleetwood United	U21
32	Zayne Bruno	(Canada)	MF	January 23, 2007 (aged 18)	(Canada) Sigma FC	U21, EYT
99	Christos Liatifis	(Greece)	MF	June 18, 2005 (aged 20)	(Greece) Panathinaikos F.C.	INT
Forwards
7	David Choinière	(Canada)	FW	February 7, 1997 (aged 28)	(Canada) Montreal Impact	
9	Brian Wright	(Canada)	FW	March 24, 1995 (aged 30)	(Canada) York United FC	
11	Nana Opoku Ampomah	(Ghana)	FW	January 2, 1996 (aged 29)	(Germany) Fortuna Düsseldorf	INT
17	Hoce Massunda	(Canada)	FW	June 19, 2005 (aged 20)	(Canada) Sigma FC	U21
18	Molham Babouli	(Syria)	FW	January 2, 1993 (aged 32)	(Canada) York United FC	
19	Tristan Borges	(Canada)	FW	August 26, 1998 (aged 27)	(Belgium) OH Leuven	
27	Victor Klonaridis	(Belgium)	FW	July 28, 1992 (aged 33)	(Greece) PAS Lamia 1964	INT
39	Béni Badibanga	(Belgium)	FW	February 19, 1996 (aged 29)	(Belgium) RAAL La Louvière	INT
41	Amadou Koné	(Canada)	FW	January 28, 2005 (aged 20)	(Canada) Carleton Ravens	U21, U Sports

=== Inactive list ===
On September 11, Forge announced it had placed Khadim Kane on the season-ending injury list, removed him from the club's primary roster, and added him to the inactive list for the remainder of the season.

No.	Name	Nationality	Position(s)	Date of birth (age)	Previous club	Notes
16	Khadim Kane	(Canada)	MF	May 17, 2005 (age 21)	(Canada) CF Montréal U23	U21

== Contracts and transfers ==
=== New contracts ===
No.	Pos.	Player	Contract details	Date	Source
10	MF	(Canada) Kyle Bekker	Multi-year contract (length undisclosed)	January 9, 2025	
19	FW	(Canada) Tristan Borges	Multi-year contract (length undisclosed)	January 15, 2025	
21	MF	(Canada) Alessandro Hojabrpour	Multi-year contract (length undisclosed)	February 4, 2025	
32	MF	(Canada) Zayne Bruno	Development contract (length undisclosed)	February 4, 2025	
41	FW	(Canada) Amadou Koné	Short-term contract (length undisclosed)	February 4, 2025	
12	FW	(Canada) Maxime Filion	U Sports contract	April 3, 2025	
41	FW	(Canada) Amadou Koné	U Sports contract	April 3, 2025	
32	MF	(Canada) Zayne Bruno	Exceptional Young Talent contract (length undisclosed)	April 4, 2025	
17	FW	(Canada) Hoce Massunda	Standard player contract (length undisclosed)	April 4, 2025	
36	GK	(Canada) Dino Bontis	Multi-year contract (length undisclosed)	September 11, 2025	

=== In ===
==== Transferred in ====
No.	Pos.	Player	From club	Fee/notes	Date	Source
9	FW	(Canada) Brian Wright	(Canada) York United FC	Free	January 8, 2025	
5	DF	(Canada) Daniel Nimick	(Canada) HFX Wanderers FC	Free	January 21, 2025	
18	FW	(Syria) Molham Babouli	(Canada) York United FC	Free	January 23, 2025	
24	DF	(Albania) Rezart Rama	(Albania) KF Egnatia	Free	January 28, 2025	
3	DF	(Serbia) Marko Jevremović	(Greece) Athens Kallithea F.C.	Free	January 31, 2025	
23	MF	(Canada) Keito Lipovschek	(United Arab Emirates) Fleetwood United	Free	February 4, 2025	
6	MF	(Canada) Ben Paton	(Scotland) Ross County	Free	February 4, 2025	
42	GK	(Canada) Emmanuel Marmolejo	(Canada) Sigma FC	Development contract	February 4, 2025	
17	FW	(Canada) Hoce Massunda	(Canada) Sigma FC	Short-term contract (length undisclosed)	February 4, 2025	
12	FW	(Canada) Maxime Filion	(Canada) Montreal Carabins	Short-term contract (length undisclosed)	February 4, 2025	
36	GK	(Canada) Dino Bontis	(Canada) Western Mustangs	U Sports contract	April 3, 2025	
33	DF	(Canada) Oliver Clow	(Canada) Sigma FC	Development contract	July 21, 2025	
99	MF	(Greece) Christos Liatifis	(Greece) Panathinaikos F.C.	Free	August 14, 2025	
27	FW	(Belgium) Victor Klonaridis	(Greece) PAS Lamia 1964	Free	September 5, 2025	
23	MF	(Canada) Harry Paton	(Scotland) Motherwell F.C.	Free	September 19, 2025 (Note: Although Forge FC announced Harry Paton's signing on September 19, the announcement stated that the signing was "finalized prior to the league's Roster Freeze Deadline on Thursday, Sept. 18.")	

==== Loaned in ====
No.	Pos.	Player	From club	Fee/notes	Date	Source
17	DF	(Mexico) Daniel Parra	(Mexico) Monterrey	Season-long loan (Note: Daniel Parra's loan ended on February 2 when he transferred to Atlético Morelia.)	January 1, 2025	

==== Draft picks ====
Forge FC made two selections in the 2025 CPL–U Sports Draft on December 5, 2024. Draft picks are not automatically signed to the team roster; only those who are signed to a contract will be listed as transfers in.

Round	Selection	Pos.	Player	Nationality	University
1	7	MF	Paul Ekwueme	Canada	McMaster
2	15	FW	Maxime Filion	Canada	Montréal

=== Out ===
No.	Pos.	Player	To club	Fee/notes	Date	Source
14	FW	(Canada) Terran Campbell	(Canada) Vancouver FC	Contract expired	December 31, 2024	
12	FW	(Canada) Sebastian Castello	(Canada) Sigma FC	Contract expired	December 31, 2024	
2	DF	(Canada) Malcolm Duncan		Contract expired	December 31, 2024	
9	FW	(Canada) Jordan Hamilton	(Myanmar) Shan United F.C.	Contract expired	December 31, 2024	
27	FW	(Belgium) Victor Klonaridis	(Greece) PAS Lamia 1964	Contract expired	December 31, 2024	
23	DF	(Canada) Garven Metusala	(United States) Colorado Springs Switchbacks FC	Contract expired	December 31, 2024	
4	DF	(Canada) Dominic Samuel		Contract expired	December 31, 2024	
88	MF	(Canada) Matteo Schiavoni	(Canada) Pacific FC	Loan ended	December 31, 2024	
17	DF	(Mexico) Daniel Parra	(Mexico) Atlético Morelia	Loan ended	February 2, 2025	
26	FW	(Cuba) Orlendis Benítez	(Canada) Scrosoppi FC	Undisclosed	Undisclosed (Note: Although Forge originally announced on January 3 it had triggered Orlendis Benítez's contract option for the 2025 season, he departed the club and joined Scrosoppi FC on or before April 29.)	
36	GK	(Canada) Dino Bontis	(Canada) Western Mustangs	Contract expired	August 15, 2025	
12	FW	(Canada) Maxime Filion	(Canada) Montreal Carabins	Contract expired	August 15, 2025	

== Club ==
=== Kits ===
On January 30, Forge announced WeatherTech Canada as the club's new "front-of-jersey" sponsor.

Forge unveiled its 2025 primary and alternate kits at a supporters event on March 19. The kits continue to be produced by Macron for a seventh consecutive season and are sponsored by WeatherTech for the first time.

Supplier: Macron / Sponsor: WeatherTech Canada

Primary	Alternate

== Competitions ==
Matches are listed in Hamilton local time: Eastern Daylight Time (UTC−4) from March 9 until November 2, and Eastern Standard Time (UTC−5) otherwise.

=== Overview ===
Competition	First match	Last match	Starting round	Final position	Record							
Competition	First match	Last match	Starting round	Final position	Pld	W	D	L	GF	GA	GD	Win %
Canadian Premier League	April 5	October 18	Matchday 1	Winners	28	16	10	2	51	22	+29	57.14
CPL Playoffs	October 26	November 2	First semifinal	Semifinals	2	0	0	2	1	3	−2	0.00
Canadian Championship	May 7	September 16	Preliminary round	Semifinals	5	2	2	1	8	9	−1	40.00
CONCACAF Champions Cup	February 5	February 11	Round one	Round one	2	0	0	2	0	5	−5	0.00
Total					37	18	12	7	60	39	+21	48.65

Last updated: November 2, 2025
Source: Competitions

=== Canadian Premier League ===
==== Table ====
Pos	Team	Pld	W	D	L	GF	GA	GD	Pts	Qualification
1	Forge (S)	28	16	10	2	51	22	+29	58	First semifinal and 2026 CONCACAF Champions Cup
2	Atlético Ottawa (C)	28	15	11	2	54	28	+26	56	First semifinal
3	Cavalry	28	11	9	8	47	36	+11	42	Quarterfinal
4	HFX Wanderers	28	11	6	11	41	34	+7	39	Play-in round
5	York United	28	10	8	10	43	38	+5	38	Play-in round
6	Valour	28	7	5	16	35	62	−27	26	
7	Pacific	28	5	8	15	30	59	−29	23	
8	Vancouver	28	4	9	15	35	57	−22	21	2026 CONCACAF Champions Cup (Note: Vancouver FC qualified for the Champions Cup as the runners-up of the 2025 Canadian Championship, due to the winners, Vancouver Whitecaps FC, qualifying through Major League Soccer.)

Source: CanPL
Rules for classification: 1) Points; 2) Total number of wins; 3) Head-to-head; 4) Goal differential; 5) Goals for; 6) Away goals differential; 7) Away goals for; 8) Home goals differential; 9) Home goals for; 10) Fewest disciplinary points; 11) Most under-21 domestic player minutes; 12) Drawing of lots.
(C) Champion (qualified to Champions Cup Round one); (S) CPL Shield winner (qualified to Champions Cup Round one)

==== Results by match ====
Match	1	2	3	4	5	6	7	8	9	10	11	12	13	14	15	16	17	18	19	20	21	22	23	24	25	26	27	28
Result	W	W	D	D	D	D	W	D	W	W	W	D	W	D	W	W	W	W	W	W	L	W	L	D	W	D	D	W
Position	3	1	3	3	3	4	4	4	4	2	2	3	2	2	2	2	1	1	1	1	1	1	1	1	1	1	1	1

Source: #Matches
W = Win; D = Draw; L = Loss

==== Matches ====
The Canadian Premier League announced each team's home openers on February 10. The full regular season schedule was released on February 12. Several matches were later rescheduled for broadcasting on TSN in Canada.

April 5 1	Forge FC	1–0	Cavalry FC	Hamilton, Ontario
5:30 pm	Bruno (yellow card) 48' (yellow-red card) 72'; Babouli 58'; Ampomah (yellow card) 90'	Report	Kamdem (yellow card) 53'	Stadium: Hamilton Stadium; Attendance: 7,963; Referee: Michael Venne
Note: Kick-off was rescheduled from 4:30 pm.

April 12 2	Pacific FC	0–2	Forge FC	Langford, British Columbia
5:00 pm	Zanatta (yellow card) 26'; Oliveira (yellow card) 27'; Quintana (yellow card) 75'	Report	Kane 44'; Achinioti-Jönsson 60'; Jevremović (yellow card) 75'; Rama (yellow card) 87'	Stadium: Starlight Stadium; Attendance: 3,402; Referee: Sebastian Noshinravani
Note: Kick-off was rescheduled from 6:00 pm.

April 19 3	Forge FC	1–1	Valour FC	Hamilton, Ontario
6:00 pm	Hojabrpour (yellow card) 37'; Wright 50'	Report	Hundal 11', (yellow card) 81'; Ohin (yellow card) 44'; Morgan (yellow card) 89'	Stadium: Hamilton Stadium; Attendance: 4,671; Referee: Yusri Rudolf

April 27 4	York United FC	2–2	Forge FC	Toronto, Ontario
2:00 pm	Ferrazzo 14', (yellow card) 66'; Singh (yellow card) 25'; Altobelli 29' (pen.)	Report	Rama 12', (yellow card) 45+4'; Wright 33' (pen.)	Stadium: York Lions Stadium; Attendance: 1,679; Referee: Scott Bowman

May 3 5	HFX Wanderers FC	0–0	Forge FC	Halifax, Nova Scotia
4:00 pm	Meilleur-Giguère (yellow card) 85'	Report	Hojabrpour (yellow card) 78'; Nimick (yellow card) 90'; Ampomah (yellow card) 90+4'	Stadium: Wanderers Grounds; Attendance: 6,104; Referee: Mario Alayass

May 13 6	Forge FC	2–2	Atlético Ottawa	Hamilton, Ontario
11:00 am	Wright (yellow card) 34'; Ampomah 38', (yellow card) 76'; Koné 75'	Report	dos Santos 37'; Abatneh (yellow card) 50'; Salter 58', (yellow card) 58'; Rodríguez (yellow card) 80' (yellow-red card) 80'	Stadium: Hamilton Stadium; Attendance: 17,971; Referee: Yusri Rudolf

May 24 7	Pacific FC	0–1	Forge FC	Langford, British Columbia
5:00 pm	Sean Young (yellow card) 85'	Report	Ampomah (yellow card) 30'; Massunda 89'	Stadium: Starlight Stadium; Attendance: 2,251; Referee: Mathieu Souaré
Note: Kick-off was rescheduled from 6:00 pm.

May 31 8	Forge FC	1–1	Cavalry FC	Hamilton, Ontario
5:00 pm	Ampomah 17', (yellow card) 21'; Owolabi-Belewu (yellow card) 55'	Report	Camargo 2', (yellow card) 83'; Daley (yellow card) 63'	Stadium: Hamilton Stadium; Attendance: 6,578; Referee: Yusri Rudolf
Note: Kick-off was rescheduled from 4:00 pm.

June 8 9	Forge FC	2–1	HFX Wanderers FC	Hamilton, Ontario
3:30 pm	Hojabrpour (yellow card) 16'; Massunda 25'; Wright 76'	Report	Mekidèche (yellow card) 41'; Telfer (yellow card) 43'; Bahamboula 82'	Stadium: Hamilton Stadium; Attendance: 6,793; Referee: Carly Shaw-MacLaren

June 15 10	Vancouver FC	0–2	Forge FC	Langley, British Columbia
4:00 pm	Navarro (yellow card) 37'; Norman Jr. (yellow card) 45+2'; Fry (yellow card) 80'	Report	Bekker 52', (yellow card) 58'; Nimick 79' (pen.); Owolabi-Belewu (yellow card) 64'	Stadium: Willoughby Community Park; Attendance: 2,006; Referee: Sebastian Noshinravani

June 22 11	Valour FC	0–5	Forge FC	Winnipeg, Manitoba
4:30 pm	Figueiredo (yellow card) 35'	Report	Wright 9', 15', 45' (pen.); Rama (yellow card) 30'; Achinioti-Jönsson (yellow card) 36'; Ampomah (yellow card) 63', (goal) 69'; Fernandez 77' (o.g.)	Stadium: Princess Auto Stadium; Attendance: 3,323; Referee: Seyed-Mohammad Mohseni
Note: Kick-off was rescheduled from 4:00 pm. Kick-off was delayed half an hour due to a thunderstorm. The match was delayed for almost two hours in the second half due to lightning.

June 29 12	Forge FC	2–2	York United FC	Hamilton, Ontario
4:00 pm	Rama (yellow card) 27'; Wright 40', (yellow card) 72'; Ampomah (yellow card) 66'; Owolabi-Belewu (yellow card) 69'; Choinière 79'	Report	Ferrin 19'; Adekugbe (yellow card) 27'; Reid 45+1', (yellow card) 50'; Yeates (yellow card) 84'	Stadium: Hamilton Stadium; Attendance: 6,621; Referee: Michael Venne

July 5 13	Forge FC	2–1	Vancouver FC	Hamilton, Ontario
5:00 pm	Campagna 23' (o.g.); B. Paton (yellow card) 60'; Filion 73'	Report	Campagna (yellow card) 36'; Fry 90+3'; Enyou (yellow card) 90+7'	Stadium: Hamilton Stadium; Attendance: 4,371; Referee: Yusri Rudolf
Note: Kick-off was rescheduled from 7:00 pm.

July 12 14	Atlético Ottawa	1–1	Forge FC	Ottawa, Ontario
3:00 pm	Tabla 90+3' (pen.)	Report	Bekker 9'; Koleilat (yellow card) 70'	Stadium: TD Place Stadium; Attendance: 6,087; Referee: Fabrizio Stasolla
Note: Kick-off was rescheduled from July 13 at 3:00 pm.

July 18 15	Forge FC	2–0	Pacific FC	Hamilton, Ontario
7:00 pm	Jevremović (yellow card) 43'; Nimick 78' (pen.); Ampomah 80'	Report	Ndom (yellow card) 43'; Bustos (yellow card) 74'	Stadium: Hamilton Stadium; Attendance: 5,844; Referee: Sebastian Noshinravani

July 25 16	HFX Wanderers FC	1–2	Forge FC	Halifax, Nova Scotia
6:00 pm	Telfer 23'; Rampersad (yellow card) 45'; Timoteo (yellow card) 90'	Report	B. Paton 7'; Babouli (yellow card) 24'; Jevremović (yellow card) 39'; Wright (yellow card) 53'; Filion 88'	Stadium: Wanderers Grounds; Attendance: 6,577; Referee: Seyed-Mohammad Mohseni

August 2 17	Forge FC	5–0	Valour FC	Hamilton, Ontario
7:00 pm	Borges 26'; Babouli 43'; Ampomah 45'; Choinière 67'; Jensen 72'	Report	Mlah (yellow card) 43'	Stadium: Hamilton Stadium; Attendance: 5,913; Referee: Youcef Boumsied

August 9 18	York United FC	1–2	Forge FC	Toronto, Ontario
1:00 pm	Bitar (yellow card) 5'; Reid (yellow card) 11'; Sturing (yellow card) 35'; López 38'	Report	Borges 14'; Filion 54'; Ampomah (yellow card) 63'	Stadium: York Lions Stadium; Attendance: 1,681; Referee: Roberto D'Alesio
Note: Kick-off was rescheduled from 2:00 pm.

August 17 19	Forge FC	2–0	Atlético Ottawa	Hamilton, Ontario
4:00 pm	Kyle Bekker 24'; Nimick (yellow card) 45'; Wright 55'; Hojabrpour (yellow card) 82'; Koné (yellow card) 90+5'	Report	Aparicio (yellow card) 36'; Castro (yellow card) 49'; Salter (yellow card) 84'; Kozlovskiy (yellow card) 90+4'	Stadium: Hamilton Stadium; Attendance: 5,247; Referee: Michael Venne
Note: Kick-off was rescheduled from August 15 at 7:00 pm.

August 22 20	Vancouver FC	0–1	Forge FC	Langley, British Columbia
10:00 pm	Bah (yellow card) 42'; Campagna (yellow card) 87'	Report	Babouli 45+1'; Wright (yellow card) 56'	Stadium: Willoughby Community Park; Attendance: 1,298; Referee: Seyed-Mohammad Mohseni

August 30 21	Cavalry FC	4–1	Forge FC	Foothills County, Alberta
4:00 pm	Warschewski 14', 55'; Aird (yellow card) 45+1'; Gutiérrez (yellow card) 45+1'; Musse 20'; Camargo 62'; Kobza (yellow card) 90+4'	Report	Ampomah 61'; Borges (yellow card) 70'; Rama (yellow card) 90+4'	Stadium: ATCO Field; Attendance: 4,786; Referee: Alain Ruch

September 6 22	Forge FC	1–0	HFX Wanderers FC	Hamilton, Ontario
4:00 pm	Massunda (yellow card) 40'; Rama (yellow card) 62'; Babouli 81'; Ampomah (yellow card) 83'	Report	Bahamboula (yellow card) 10'; Yesli (yellow card) 30'; Callegari (yellow card) 48'; Rea (yellow card) 57'	Stadium: Hamilton Stadium; Attendance: 6,825; Referee: Mario Alayass

September 11 23	Valour FC	2–1	Forge FC	Winnipeg, Manitoba
8:00 pm	Antonoglou (yellow card) 43'; Froese 57', 64'; Ohin (yellow card) 84'	Report	Borges 22'; Cissé (yellow card) 40'; Jevremović (yellow card) 73'	Stadium: Princess Auto Stadium; Attendance: 1,841; Referee: Iwan-Nikita Jecanski
Note: Kick-off was rescheduled from September 12 at 8:00 pm.

September 21 24	Atlético Ottawa	1–1	Forge FC	Ottawa, Ontario
3:00 pm	Antinoro 25'; Aparicio (yellow card) 61'; Ortega (yellow card) 87'	Report	Rama (yellow card) 53'; Massunda 82'	Stadium: TD Place Stadium; Attendance: 5,348; Referee: Scott Bowman
Note: Kick-off was delayed by 10 minutes due to "logistical challenges with Forge's travel to the stadium."

September 27 25	Forge FC	4–0	Pacific FC	Hamilton, Ontario
4:00 pm	Massunda 3'; Jensen 22'; Cissé 88'; Hojabrpour (yellow card) 89'; Wright 90+5'	Report	Juhmi (yellow card) 43'; Greco-Taylor (yellow card) 45+2'	Stadium: Hamilton Stadium; Attendance: 6,017; Referee: Renzo Villanueva

October 4 26	Forge FC	1–1	Vancouver FC	Hamilton, Ontario
4:30 pm	Borges 45'; Rama (yellow card) 60'; Koné (yellow card) 89'	Report	Norman (yellow card) 43'; Crawford (yellow card) 52'; Fotsing 72', (yellow card) 90+6'; Ouattara (yellow card) 77'	Stadium: Hamilton Stadium; Attendance: 5,719; Referee: Yusri Rudolf
Note: Kick-off was rescheduled from 5:00 pm.

October 10 27	Cavalry FC	1–1	Forge FC	Foothills County, Alberta
9:30 pm	Camargo 25'; Klomp (yellow card) 27'; Laing (yellow card) 29'	Report	Choinière (yellow card) 15'; Wright 31' (pen.); Hojabrpour (yellow card) 47'; Rama (yellow card) 69'; Jevremović (yellow card) 86'	Stadium: ATCO Field; Attendance: 4,763; Referee: Alain Ruch
Note: Kick-off was rescheduled from 9:00 pm.

October 18 28	Forge FC	3–0	York United FC	Hamilton, Ontario
4:00 pm	Hojabrpour 11'; Wright 45+2', 54'	Report	Singh (yellow card) 27'; Kibato (yellow card) 35'; Costa (yellow card) 90+2'	Stadium: Hamilton Stadium; Attendance: 6,521; Referee: Carly Shaw-MacLaren

==== Playoff matches ====
Forge clinched its spot in the CPL playoffs on August 24, clinched a home playoff match on September 12, and clinched first place and the top seed in the playoffs on October 18. That same day, the club announced that it would host the Page playoff first semifinal on October 26.

Following the team's loss in the first semifinal, Forge announced that it would host the Page playoff second semifinal on November 2.

October 26 First semifinal	Forge FC	1–2	Atlético Ottawa	Hamilton, Ontario
2:00 pm	Choinière 23'; Ampomah (yellow card) 52'; Koleilat (yellow card) 90+10'	Report	Salter (yellow card) 32', (goal) 58'; Antinoro 33'; Zapater (yellow card) 90+10'	Stadium: Hamilton Stadium; Attendance: 6,463; Referee: Carly Shaw-MacLaren

November 2 Second semifinal	Forge FC	0–1	Cavalry FC	Hamilton, Ontario
4:00 pm	Hojabrpour (yellow card) 44'; Owolabi-Belewu (yellow card) 45+1'; Ampomah (yellow card) 56'; Borges (yellow card) 90+8'	Report	Kobza (yellow card) 30'; Warschewski 57'; Ntignee (yellow card) 90+3'; Diego Gutiérrez (yellow card) 90+4'	Stadium: Hamilton Stadium; Referee: Yusri Rudolf

=== Canadian Championship ===
The draw for the preliminary round and quarterfinals was held on December 12, 2024. The draw for the semifinals and hosting rights for the single-leg final was held on July 9.

==== Preliminary round ====
The preliminary round schedule was announced on February 18.

May 7 Single leg	Forge FC	3–1	HFX Wanderers FC	Hamilton, Ontario
7:00 pm	Babouli 22', 90+1'; Sow 26' (o.g.); Nimick (yellow card) 57'; B. Paton (yellow card) 61'; Jensen (yellow card) 82'	Report	Meilleur-Giguère 41'; Sow (yellow card) 74'	Stadium: Hamilton Stadium; Attendance: 3,098; Referee: Alain Ruch

==== Quarterfinals ====
The quarterfinals schedule was announced on May 12.

May 20 Leg 1	Forge FC	1–0	CF Montréal	Hamilton, Ontario
7:00 pm	Achinioti-Jönsson (yellow card) 24'; Owolabi-Belewu (yellow card) 35'; Wright 68'; Jensen (yellow card) 90+5'	Report	Waterman (yellow card) 43'; Owusu (yellow card) 66'; Piette (yellow card) 68'; Craig (yellow card) 90+1'	Stadium: Tim Hortons Field; Attendance: 3,064; Referee: Ben Hoskins

July 9 Leg 2	CF Montréal	2–2 (2–3 agg.)	Forge FC	Montreal, Quebec
7:00 pm	Owusu (yellow card) 36', (goal) 58', 90+5'	Report	Jevremović (yellow card) 45'; Borges (yellow card) 65', (goal) 79'; Bekker 82'	Stadium: Saputo Stadium; Attendance: 13,125; Referee: Renzo Villanueva
Note: The match was delayed for 20 minutes in the second half due to a power outage.

==== Semifinals ====
The semifinals schedule was announced on July 11.

August 13 Leg 1	Forge FC	2–2	Vancouver Whitecaps FC	Hamilton, Ontario
7:00 pm	Ampomah 11'; Choinière (yellow card) 31'; Wright 34'; Jensen (yellow card) 83'	Report	Blackmon 18', (yellow card) 75'; White 29'	Stadium: Hamilton Stadium; Attendance: 8,324; Referee: Yusri Rudolf

September 16 Leg 2	Vancouver Whitecaps FC	4–0 (6–2 agg.)	Forge FC	Vancouver, British Columbia
10:00 pm	Blackmon 7'; Badwal (yellow card) 18'; Ngando 28'; Berhalter 49' (pen.); Cabrera (yellow card) 80'; Nelson 85'	Report	Rama (yellow card) 26'; Hojabrpour (yellow card) 34'; Jevremović (yellow card) 48'	Stadium: BC Place; Attendance: 10,752; Referee: Michael Venne

=== CONCACAF Champions Cup ===
The CONCACAF Champions Cup draw was held on December 10, 2024, with Forge drawing Liga MX side C.F. Monterrey in round one. Having qualified as CPL regular season winners, Forge entered the competition in round one and began play in February 2025.

==== Round one ====
The round one schedule was announced on December 13, 2024.

February 5 Leg 1	Forge FC (Canada)	0–2	(Mexico) Monterrey	Hamilton, Ontario
8:00 pm		Report	Deossa 53'; Cortizo 66'; Chávez (yellow card) 81'; Soto (yellow card) 89'	Stadium: Hamilton Stadium; Attendance: 5,413; Referee: Lukasz Szpala (United States)

February 11 Leg 2	Monterrey (Mexico)	3–0 (5–0 agg.)	(Canada) Forge FC	Guadalupe, Nuevo León
8:00 pm	Berterame 19', 58'; Deossa (yellow card) 31'; Cortizo 48'; Medina (yellow card) 81'; de la Rosa (yellow card) 84'	Report	Borges (yellow card) 18'; Choinière (yellow card) 70'	Stadium: Estadio BBVA; Attendance: 24,630; Referee: Walter López Castellanos (Guatemala)

== Statistics ==
As of November 2, 2025

=== Squad and statistics ===
No.	Pos	Nat	Player	Total		CPL		CPL Playoffs		Canadian Championship		Champions Cup	
No.	Pos	Nat	Player	Apps	Goals	Apps	Goals	Apps	Goals	Apps	Goals	Apps	Goals
1	GK	(Czech Republic) CZE	Jassem Koleilat	36	0	27+0	0	2+0	0	5+0	0	2+0	0
3	DF	(Serbia) SRB	Marko Jevremović	33	0	21+4	0	2+0	0	4+0	0	2+0	0
5	DF	(Canada) CAN	Daniel Nimick	37	2	28+0	2	2+0	0	5+0	0	2+0	0
6	MF	(Canada) CAN	Ben Paton	30	1	10+15	1	0+0	0	1+2	0	0+2	0
7	FW	(Canada) CAN	David Choinière	30	3	12+10	2	1+1	1	3+1	0	2+0	0
8	MF	(Senegal) SEN	Elimane Cissé	12	1	2+9	1	0+0	0	0+1	0	0+0	0
9	FW	(Canada) CAN	Brian Wright	35	14	23+3	12	2+0	0	5+0	2	2+0	0
10	MF	(Canada) CAN	Kyle Bekker	35	4	24+2	3	2+0	0	5+0	1	2+0	0
11	FW	(Ghana) GHA	Nana Opoku Ampomah	27	7	16+3	6	1+1	0	4+1	1	0+1	0
13	MF	(Sweden) SWE	Alexander Achinioti-Jönsson	37	1	27+1	1	2+0	0	5+0	0	2+0	0
16	MF	(Canada) CAN	Khadim Kane	19	1	5+9	1	0+0	0	0+3	0	0+2	0
17	FW	(Canada) CAN	Hoce Massunda	31	4	16+9	4	2+0	0	0+4	0	0+0	0
18	FW	(Syria) SYR	Molham Babouli	33	6	19+5	4	0+2	0	4+1	2	2+0	0
19	FW	(Canada) CAN	Tristan Borges	29	5	15+6	4	1+1	0	3+1	1	2+0	0
21	MF	(Canada) CAN	Alessandro Hojabrpour	25	1	17+1	1	2+0	0	3+0	0	2+0	0
22	MF	(Canada) CAN	Noah Jensen	30	2	11+13	2	0+1	0	1+2	0	0+2	0
23	MF	(Canada) CAN	Harry Paton	6	0	0+4	0	0+2	0	0+0	0	0+0	0
24	DF	(Albania) ALB	Rezart Rama	34	1	23+2	1	2+0	0	5+0	0	2+0	0
27	FW	(Belgium) BEL	Victor Klonaridis	3	0	1+1	0	0+0	0	0+1	0	0+0	0
28	MF	(Canada) CAN	Keito Lipovschek	4	0	1+3	0	0+0	0	0+0	0	0+0	0
29	GK	(Canada) CAN	Christopher Kalongo	1	0	0+1	0	0+0	0	0+0	0	0+0	0
32	MF	(Canada) CAN	Zayne Bruno	4	0	1+3	0	0+0	0	0+0	0	0+0	0
36	GK	(Canada) CAN	Dino Bontis	1	0	1+0	0	0+0	0	0+0	0	0+0	0
41	FW	(Canada) CAN	Amadou Koné	13	1	0+11	1	0+0	0	0+1	0	0+1	0
81	DF	(England) ENG	Malik Owolabi-Belewu	15	0	7+4	0	1+1	0	2+0	0	0+0	0
Player(s) transferred out during this season
12	FW	(Canada) CAN	Maxime Filion	20	3	1+14	3	0+0	0	0+3	0	0+2	0

=== Goal scorers ===
Rank	Nat.	Player	Pos.	CPL	CPL Playoffs	Canadian Championship	Champions Cup	TOTAL
1	(Canada)	Brian Wright	FW	12	0	2	0	14
2	(Ghana)	Nana Ampomah	FW	6	0	1	0	7
3	(Syria)	Molham Babouli	FW	4	0	2	0	6
4	(Canada)	Tristan Borges	FW	4	0	1	0	5
5	(Canada)	Kyle Bekker	MF	3	0	1	0	4
5	(Canada)	Hoce Massunda	FW	4	0	0	0	4
7	(Canada)	David Choinière	FW	2	1	0	0	3
7	(Canada)	Maxime Filion	FW	3	0	0	0	3
9	(Canada)	Noah Jensen	MF	2	0	0	0	2
9	(Canada)	Daniel Nimick	DF	2	0	0	0	2
11	(Sweden)	Alexander Achinioti-Jönsson	MF	1	0	0	0	1
11	(Senegal)	Elimane Cissé	MF	1	0	0	0	1
11	(Canada)	Alessandro Hojabrpour	MF	1	0	0	0	1
11	(Canada)	Khadim Kane	MF	1	0	0	0	1
11	(Canada)	Amadou Koné	FW	1	0	0	0	1
11	(Canada)	Ben Paton	MF	1	0	0	0	1
11	(Albania)	Rezart Rama	DF	1	0	0	0	1
Own goals				2	0	1	0	3
Totals				51	1	8	0	60

=== Clean sheets ===
On September 6, Jassem Koleilat secured his 11th clean sheet of the season to set a new CPL record for most shutouts in a single season.

Rank	Nat.	Player	CPL	CPL Playoffs	Canadian Championship	Champions Cup	TOTAL
1	(Czech Republic)	Jassem Koleilat	13	0	1	0	14
Totals			13	0	1	0	14

== Honours ==
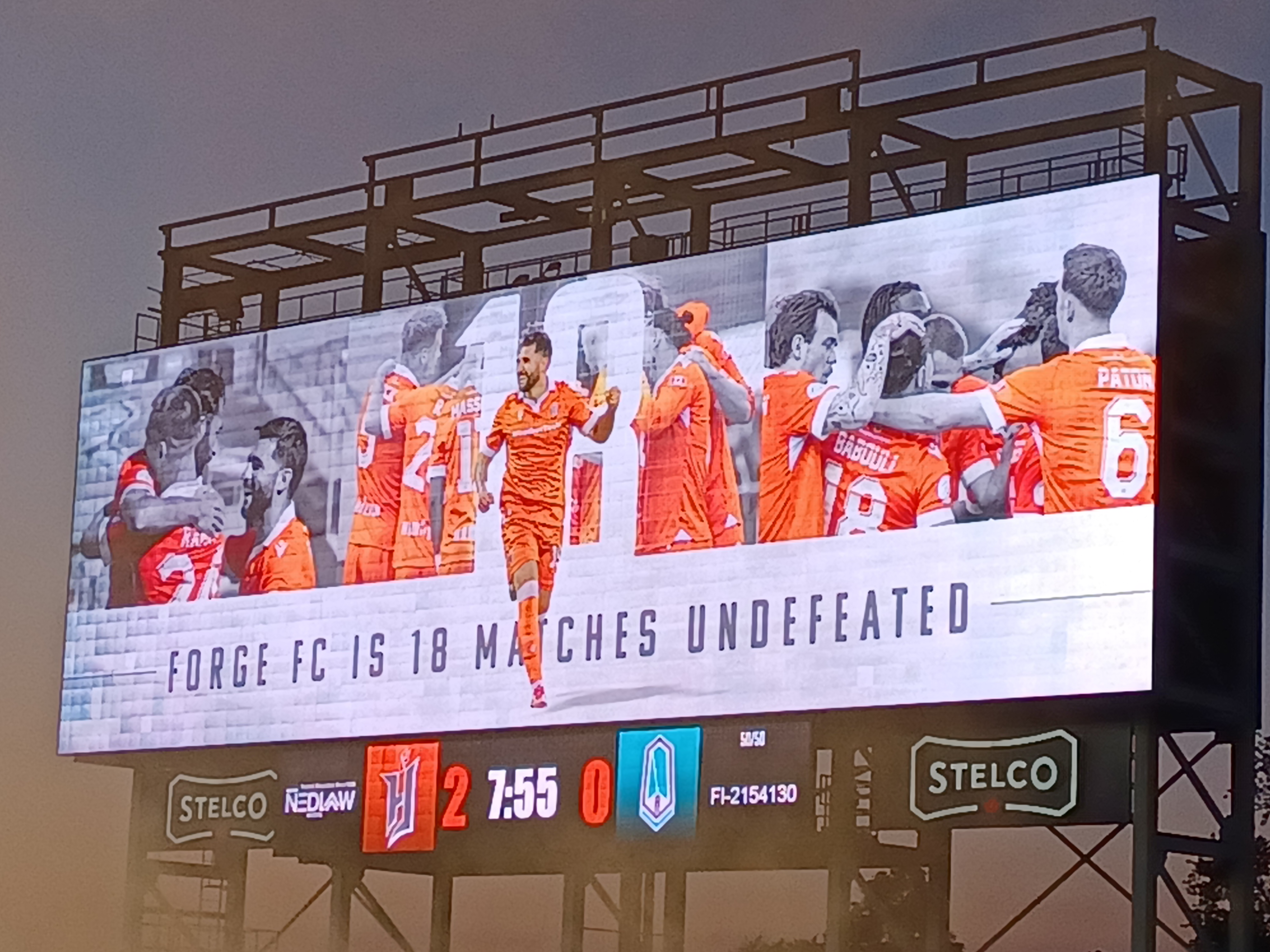
The Hamilton Stadium video board after Forge set a new CPL record for longest unbeaten run in league play on July 18, 2025

=== Canadian Premier League Awards ===
The 2025 Canadian Premier League Awards ceremony was held on November 7 in Gatineau, Quebec.

Name	Award	Status
Nana Ampomah	Player's Player of the Year	Nominated
Kyle Bekker	Player of the Year	Nominated
Kyle Bekker	Player's Player of the Year	Nominated
Jassem Koleilat	Golden Glove	Won
Hoce Massunda	Best Canadian U-21 Player	Nominated
Daniel Nimick	Defender of the Year	Won
Daniel Nimick	Player of the Year	Nominated
Daniel Nimick	Player's Player of the Year	Nominated
Rezart Rama	Defender of the Year	Nominated
Bobby Smyrniotis	Coach of the Year	Won

==== Best XI ====
The CPL's Best XI was selected by the league's soccer department.

Name	Source
Nana Ampomah; Kyle Bekker; Jassem Koleilat; Daniel Nimick; Rezart Rama	

==== Monthly awards ====
Month	Name	Award	Source
June	Daniel Nimick	Player of the Month	
July	Kyle Bekker	Player of the Month	
July	Jassem Koleilat	Goalkeeper of the Month	
August	Bobby Smyrniotis	Manager of the Month	

==== Player of the Week ====
Week	Name	Source
12	Brian Wright	
17	Nana Ampomah	
28	Brian Wright (2)	

==== Team of the Week ====
The Team of the Week is usually selected by the CPL's Kristian Jack and OneSoccer's Oliver Platt.

Week	Name	Source
1	Molham Babouli; Marko Jevremović; Jassem Koleilat; Daniel Nimick	
2	Alexander Achinioti-Jönsson; Nana Ampomah; Kyle Bekker; Khadim Kane	
4	Alessandro Hojabrpour	
5	Kyle Bekker (2)	
7	Nana Ampomah (2)	
8	Daniel Nimick (2)	
9	Nana Ampomah (3); Malik Owolabi-Belewu	
10	Hoce Massunda; Daniel Nimick (3); Brian Wright	
11	Kyle Bekker (3); Daniel Nimick (4)	
12	Nana Ampomah (4); Alessandro Hojabrpour (2); Daniel Nimick (5); Brian Wright (2)	
13	Rezart Rama; Brian Wright (3)	
14	Jassem Koleilat (2); Kyle Bekker (4)	
15	Nana Ampomah (5); Kyle Bekker (5); Daniel Nimick (6)	
16	Kyle Bekker (6); Ben Paton	
17	Nana Ampomah (6); Molham Babouli (2); Kyle Bekker (7); Rezart Rama (2)	
18	Tristan Borges; Alessandro Hojabrpour (3)	
19	Kyle Bekker (8); Alessandro Hojabrpour (4); Marko Jevremović (2); Brian Wright (4)	
20	Alexander Achinioti-Jönsson (2); Rezart Rama (3)	
22	Nana Ampomah (7)	
24	Hoce Massunda (2)	
25	Noah Jensen; Marko Jevremović (3); Hoce Massunda (3); Daniel Nimick (7)	
27	Alexander Achinioti-Jönsson (3)	
28	Alexander Achinioti-Jönsson (4); Tristan Borges (2); David Choinière; Brian Wright (5)	
