= Hoce Massunda =

Canadian soccer player (born 2005)

Personal information
- Date of birth: June 19, 2005 (age 21)
- Place of birth: Toronto, Ontario, Canada
- Height: 1.80 m (5 ft 11 in)
- Position: Forward

Team information
- Current team: Forge FC
- Number: 17

Youth career
- Sigma FC

Senior career*
Years	Team	Apps	(Gls)
2022–2024	Sigma FC	29	(1)
2024	→ Sigma FC B	7	(2)
2025–	Forge FC	51	(8)
2025–	→ Sigma FC (loan)	1	(0)
- * Club domestic league appearances and goals as of October 25, 2026

Hoce Massunda (born June 19, 2005) is a Canadian professional soccer player who plays for Canadian Premier League club Forge FC.

== Early life ==
Born in Toronto, Massunda played youth soccer with Sigma FC.

== Club career ==
In 2022, Massunda began playing with Sigma FC in League1 Ontario.

In February 2025, he signed a short-term contract with Canadian Premier League club Forge FC, ahead of their 2025 CONCACAF Champions Cup matches. In April 2025, he signed a standard contract with the club. On May 24, 2025, he scored his first professional goal, netting the winning goal in the 89th minute in a 1–0 victory over Pacific FC. At the end of the 2025 season, he was nominated for the Canadian Premier League's Best Canadian U-21 Player Award.

== Career statistics ==
As of November 3, 2025

Club	Season	League			Playoffs		National Cup		League Cup		Continental		Total	
Club	Season	Division	Apps	Goals	Apps	Goals	Apps	Goals	Apps	Goals	Apps	Goals	Apps	Goals
Sigma FC	2022	League1 Ontario	2	0	—		—		—		—		2	0
Sigma FC	2023	League1 Ontario	8	0	—		—		—		—		8	0
Sigma FC	2024	League1 Ontario Premier	19	1	—		—		2	2	—		21	3
Sigma FC	Total		29	1	0	0	0	0	2	2	0	0	31	3
Sigma FC B	2024	League2 Ontario	7	2	2	0	—		—		—		9	2
Forge FC	2025	Canadian Premier League	25	4	2	0	4	0	—		0	0	31	4
Sigma FC (loan)	2025	League1 Ontario Premier	1	0	—		—		0	0	—		1	0
Career total			62	7	4	0	4	0	2	2	0	0	72	9

== Honours ==
Forge FC

- CPL Shield: 2025
- Canadian Championship: 2026
