= Nana Ampomah =

Ghanaian footballer (born 1996)

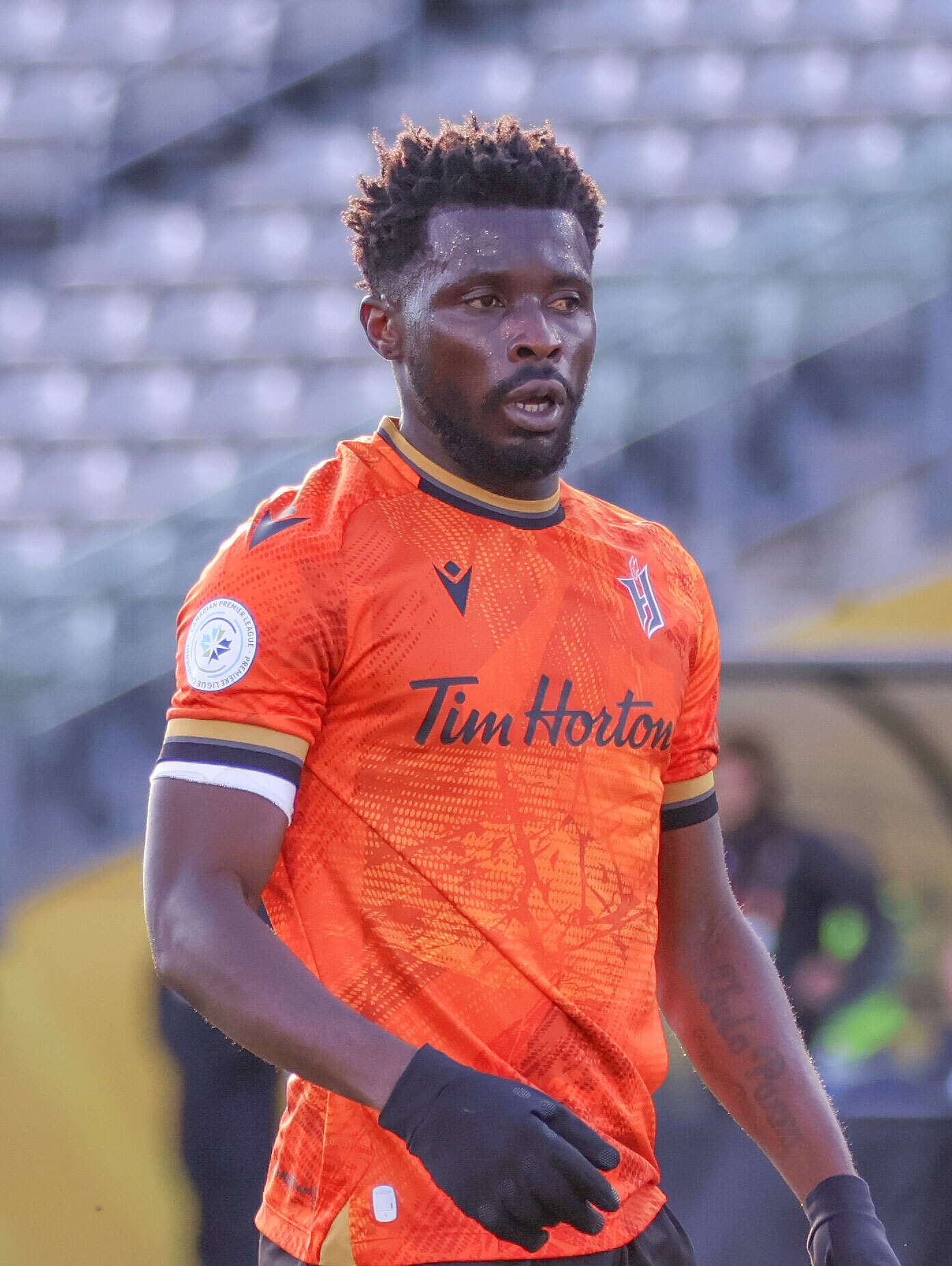
- Ampomah with Forge FC in 2024

Personal information
- Full name: Nana Opoku Ampomah
- Date of birth: 2 January 1996 (age 30)
- Place of birth: Tema, Ghana
- Height: 1.75 m (5 ft 9 in)
- Position: Winger

Team information
- Current team: Forge FC
- Number: 11

Youth career
- Prisco Minis
- Santos Academy
- Bravo Bravo
- 2016: KV Mechelen

Senior career*
Years	Team	Apps	(Gls)
2016–2019	Waasland-Beveren	84	(18)
2019–2023	Fortuna Düsseldorf	13	(0)
2020–2022	→ Royal Antwerp (loan)	15	(1)
2022–2023	→ Fortuna Düsseldorf II	8	(3)
2024–	Forge FC	47	(11)
2026–	→ Sigma FC (loan)	1	(1)

International career^{‡}
2017–2018	Ghana	4	(0)
- * Club domestic league appearances and goals as of 25 Ocotober 2026 ‡ National team caps and goals as of 18 November 2018

Nana Opoku Ampomah (born 2 January 1996) is a Ghanaian professional footballer who plays as a winger for Canadian Premier League club Forge FC.

== Early life ==
Ampomah played youth football with Prisco Minis, Santos Academy (the Ghanaian training center of Brazilian club Santos FC), and FC Bravo Bravo in his native Ghana. In 2016, he joined the U21 team of Belgian club KV Mechelen.

== Club career ==
In July 2016, Ampomah signed a three-year contract with an option for an additional season with Belgian Pro League club Waasland-Beveren.

In 2019, he signed with German Bundesliga club Fortuna Düsseldorf. In October 2020, he was loaned to Royal Antwerp of the Belgian Pro League. After failing to secure a move to another club in the summer of 2021, he returned to Antwerp for another season on loan. After his loan spell, he returned to Fortuna Düsseldorf in June 2022, after not making any appearances in his second season. After dealing with injuries upon his return, and arriving to pre-season late, he was sent to the second team, Fortuna Düsseldorf II, in the Regionalliga during the 2022–23 season. He departed the club at the end of June 2023, upon the expiry of his contract.

In February 2024, Ampomah signed a multi-year contract with Forge FC of the Canadian Premier League. Due to work permit issues, his arrival to the club was delayed, with Ampomah finally able to join the club in June 2024. He made his debut on 15 June, recording an assist in a 2–2 draw against the HFX Wanderers. He scored his first goal on 27 July in a 3–0 victory over the HFX Wanderers. In December 2025, he signed a multi-year extension with the club.

== International career ==
Ampomah has earned four caps for the Ghana national team (one appearance in World Cup qualification, one appearance in African Cup of Nations Qualification, and two friendly appearances).

== Career statistics ==
=== Club ===
As of November 3, 2025

Club	Season	League			Playoffs		National Cup (Note: Includes appearances in the Belgian Cup, the DFB-Pokal and the Canadian Championship)		Continental (Note: Includes appearances in UEFA Europa League)		Other		Total	
Club	Season	Division	Apps	Goals	Apps	Goals	Apps	Goals	Apps	Goals	Apps	Goals	Apps	Goals
Waasland-Beveren	2016–17	Belgian First Division A	18	2	—		2	0	—		—		20	2
Waasland-Beveren	2017–18	Belgian First Division A	36	8	—		2	1	—		—		38	9
Waasland-Beveren	2018–19	Belgian First Division A	30	8	—		0	0	—		—		30	8
Waasland-Beveren	Total		84	18	0	0	4	1	0	0	0	0	88	19
Fortuna Düsseldorf	2019–20	Bundesliga	12	0	—		4	2	—		—		16	2
Fortuna Düsseldorf	2020–21	2. Bundesliga	1	0	—		1	0	—		—		2	0
Fortuna Düsseldorf	2021–22	2. Bundesliga	0	0	—		0	0	—		—		0	0
Fortuna Düsseldorf	2022–23	2. Bundesliga	0	0	—		0	0	—		—		0	0
Fortuna Düsseldorf	Total		13	0	0	0	5	2	0	0	0	0	18	2
Royal Antwerp (loan)	2020–21	Belgian First Division A	15	1	—		2	0	7	0	—		24	1
Royal Antwerp (loan)	2021–22	Belgian First Division A	0	0	—		0	0	0	0	—		0	0
Royal Antwerp (loan)	Total		15	1	0	0	2	0	7	0	0	0	24	1
Fortuna Düsseldorf II	2022–23	Regionalliga West	8	3	—		—		—		—		8	3
Forge FC	2024	Canadian Premier League	14	2	3	0	2	0	0	0	—		19	2
Forge FC	2025	Canadian Premier League	19	6	2	0	5	1	1	0	—		27	7
Forge FC	Total		33	8	5	0	7	1	1	0	0	0	46	9
Career totals			153	30	5	0	18	4	8	0	0	0	184	34

=== International ===
As of 22 October 2024

Ghana
Year	Apps	Goals
2017	1	0
2018	3	0
Total	4	0

== Honours ==
Forge FC

- CPL Shield: 2024, 2025
- Canadian Championship: 2026
