= Marko Jevremović =

Serbian footballer (born 1996)

Personal information
- Date of birth: 23 February 1996 (age 30)
- Place of birth: Belgrade, FR Yugoslavia
- Height: 1.85 m (6 ft 1 in)
- Position: Left-back

Team information
- Current team: Forge FC
- Number: 3

Youth career
- Rad
- Brodarac

Senior career*
Years	Team	Apps	(Gls)
2014–2017	Radnički Obrenovac	92	(9)
2018–2019	Mladost Lučani	8	(1)
2018	→ Sloga Požega (loan)	16	(1)
2019–2022	Javor Ivanjica	95	(2)
2022–2023	Enosis Neon Paralimni	37	(2)
2023	Zvijezda 09	7	(0)
2024	Athens Kallithea	8	(0)
2025–	Forge FC	48	(2)

International career^{‡}
2021	Serbia	1	(0)
- * Club domestic league appearances and goals as of 25 October 2026 ‡ National team caps and goals as of 08:18, 29 January 2021 (UTC)

Marko Jevremović (Serbian Cyrillic: Марко Јевремовић; born 23 February 1996) is a Serbian professional footballer who plays as a left-back for Canadian Premier League club Forge FC.

== Club career ==
After coming through the youth system of Rad and Brodarac, Jevremović made his first-team debut for Radnički Obrenovac in the Serbian League Belgrade. He was later acquired by Serbian SuperLiga side Mladost Lučani in the 2018 winter transfer window, but immediately loaned to Serbian League West club Sloga Požega for the rest of the season. In January 2024, Jevremović joined Athens Kallithea FC.

On 31 January 2025, Jevremović signed a multi-year contract with Canadian Premier League side Forge FC.

== International career ==
Jevremović made his debut for Serbia in a January 2021 friendly match away against Panama, coming on as a 61st minute substitute for Slobodan Urošević.

== Honours ==
Forge FC

- CPL Shield: 2025
- Canadian Championship: 2026
