= Harry Paton (soccer) =

Canadian soccer player (born 1998)

Personal information
- Full name: Harrison Theodore Paton
- Date of birth: May 23, 1998 (age 28)
- Place of birth: Kitchener, Ontario, Canada
- Height: 1.75 m (5 ft 9 in)
- Position: Midfielder

Team information
- Current team: Cavalry FC

Youth career
- Kitchener SC
- 2015–2016: Fulham
- 2016–2017: Heart of Midlothian

Senior career*
Years	Team	Apps	(Gls)
2017–2018	Heart of Midlothian	0	(0)
2017–2018	→ Stenhousemuir (loan)	31	(8)
2018–2022	Ross County	89	(1)
2018–2019	→ Stenhousemuir (loan)	13	(1)
2023–2025	Motherwell	54	(2)
2025	Forge FC	4	(0)
2026–	Cavalry FC	23	(2)

International career^{‡}
2015	Canada U17	6	(0)
2015	Canada U20	1	(0)
2023–	Canada	1	(0)
- * Club domestic league appearances and goals as of October 12, 2026 ‡ National team caps and goals as of October 13, 2023

Harrison Theodore Paton (born May 23, 1998) is a Canadian soccer player who plays as a midfielder for Cavalry FC of the Canadian Premier League and the Canada national team.

== Early life ==
Paton began playing youth soccer at age five with Kitchener SC. He later moved to Europe, joining the Fulham Academy in England and the Heart of Midlothian Academy in Scotland.

== Club career ==
=== Early career ===
Paton began his senior career with Stenhousemuir of League Two on loan from Hearts and was part of their successful season getting promoted to League One. For his efforts with the club, he was named to the League 2 Team of the Season.

=== Ross County ===
Paton would sign a one-year deal with Scottish Championship side Ross County in July 2018. Paton made his debut for Ross County against Alloa in the Scottish League Cup, where he also scored his first goal for the club. In his first season with Ross County, Paton would spend the first half of the season back on loan with Stenhousemuir, but would return from loan in January, and would make 7 appearances for the club.

Ross County would re-sign Paton for the 2019-20 season, and he would make his first start for the club in September 2019. Paton would make 23 appearances for the club in 2019-20, breaking into the first team on a full-time basis.

On May 25, 2020, Ross County announced Paton had signed a new deal with the club. In June 2022, it was announced that Paton had turned down a new contract offer with the club, ending his time at Ross County after four seasons.

=== Motherwell ===
In April 2023, Paton signed for Scottish side Motherwell on a contract until the end of the season, making his debut for the club later the same day. In June 2023, he signed a new two-year contract to remain with the club. Paton scored his first goal on August 26 for Motherwell, netting a stoppage-time winner to complete a 2-1 comeback win against Kilmarnock.

On 28 May 2025, Motherwell announced that they were in discussions with Paton over a new contract, however on 16 June 2025 Motherwell confirmed that Paton had left the club after his contract hadn't been renewed.

=== Forge FC ===
In September 2025, Paton joined Canadian Premier League club Forge FC for the remainder of the 2025 season.

=== Cavalry FC ===
On February 5, 2026, Paton joined Canadian Premier League club Cavalry FC for the 2026 season.

== International career ==
=== Youth ===
Paton was part of the Canada U17 team who participated in the 2015 CONCACAF U-17 Championship where Paton played 6 times. He would be named to Canada's provisional squad for the 2020 CONCACAF Men's Olympic Qualifying Championship in February 2020. Paton was set to be named to the team ahead of the rescheduled tournament in March 2021, but Ross County opted to not release him.

=== Senior ===
In June 2021, Paton was named to Canada's 60-man preliminary squad for the 2021 CONCACAF Gold Cup. On July 1, he was named to the final 23-man squad. Paton would join the team late due to COVID-19 protocols after a number of Ross County players and staff tested positive for the virus prior to his departure. He would fail to make an appearance at the tournament.

In October 2023, Paton returned to the national team ahead of a friendly against Japan in Niigata. He made his debut for Canada in the match on October 13, coming on as a substitute for Samuel Piette at the 61st minute.

== Personal life ==
Paton's younger brother, Ben, is also a professional soccer player.

== Career statistics ==
=== Club ===
As of match played November 21, 2026

Appearances and goals by club, season and competition
Club	Season	League			Playoffs		National Cup		League Cup		Other		Total	
Club	Season	Division	Apps	Goals	Apps	Goals	Apps	Goals	Apps	Goals	Apps	Goals	Apps	Goals
Stenhousemuir (loan)	2017–18	Scottish League Two	31	8	—		2	0	2	0	4 (Note: Appearances in 2017–18 Scottish League One Play-offs)	0	39	8
Ross County	2018–19	Scottish Championship	4	0	—		0	0	1	1	2 (Note: Appearances in 2018–19 Scottish Challenge Cup)	0	7	1
Ross County	2019–20	Scottish Premiership	19	0	—		1	0	3	1	1 (Note: Appearances in 2019–20 Scottish Challenge Cup)	0	24	1
Ross County	2020–21	Scottish Premiership	35	1	—		0	0	5	1	0	0	40	2
Ross County	2021–22	Scottish Premiership	31	0	—		1	0	0	0	0	0	32	0
Ross County	Total		89	1	0	0	2	0	9	3	3	0	103	4
Stenhousemuir (loan)	2018–19	Scottish League One	13	1	—		1	0	0	0	0	0	14	1
Motherwell	2022–23	Scottish Premiership	7	0	—		0	0	0	0	0	0	7	0
Motherwell	2023–24	Scottish Premiership	26	2	—		2	0	4	0	0	0	32	2
Motherwell	2024–25	Scottish Premiership	21	0	—		0	0	3	0	0	0	24	0
Motherwell	Total		54	2	0	0	2	0	7	0	0	0	63	2
Forge FC	2025	CPL	4	0	2	0	0	0	—		0	0	6	0
Cavalry FC	2026	CPL	23	2	3	0	2	0	0	0	26	2		
Career total			215	14	5	0	7	0	19	3	7	0	252	17

=== International ===
As of match played October 13, 2023

Appearances and goals by national team and year
National team	Year	Apps	Goals
Canada	2023	1	0
Total		1	0

== Honours ==
=== Club ===
Ross County

- Scottish Championship: 2018–19
- Scottish Challenge Cup: 2018–19
