= Daniel Nimick =

Canadian soccer player (born 2000)

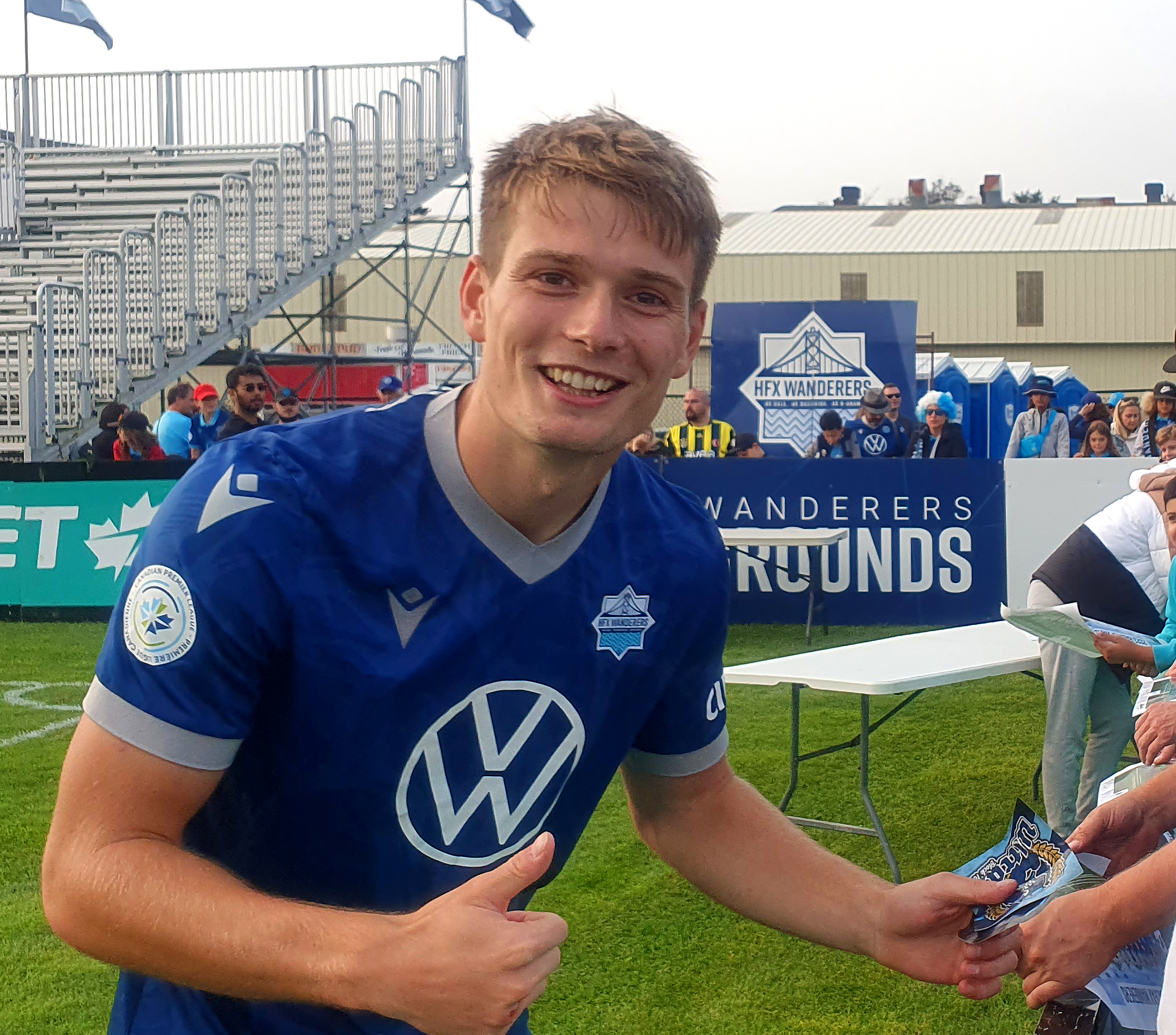
- Nimick with HFX Wanderers in 2023

Personal information
- Date of birth: September 22, 2000 (age 26)
- Place of birth: Happy Valley-Goose Bay, Canada
- Height: 6 ft 2 in (1.88 m)
- Position: Centre-back

Team information
- Current team: Forge FC
- Number: 5

Youth career
- Beckwithshaw Saints
- Pannal Ash
- 2009–2017: Leeds United
- 2017–2019: Harrogate Town

College career
Years	Team	Apps	(Gls)
2019–2022	Western Michigan Broncos	65	(12)

Senior career*
Years	Team	Apps	(Gls)
2019	Harrogate Town	0	(0)
2021	Grand Rapids FC	11	(1)
2022	South Bend Lions	9	(3)
2023–2024	HFX Wanderers	51	(14)
2025–	Forge FC	54	(6)
- * Club domestic league appearances and goals as of October 25, 2026

Daniel Nimick (born September 22, 2000) is a Canadian professional soccer player who plays for Forge FC in the Canadian Premier League.

== Early life ==
Nimick was born in Happy Valley-Goose Bay, Newfoundland and Labrador in Canada, to an English mother and an Irish/Northern Irish father, where his father who was part of the Royal Air Force and was posted at CFB Goose Bay. After he turned one, his family moved to Harrogate, England. Nimick first played youth football with the Beckwithshaw Saints Junior Football Club and Pannal Ash Junior Football Club. At age eight, he joined the Leeds United academy, where he played for eight years. He then joined Harrogate Town's youth program, where he captained the youth side to the U23 Pro Development League title in 2019.

== College career ==
In 2019, Nimick moved to the United States to attend Western Michigan University, where he played for the men's soccer team. On November 15, 2019, he scored his first collegiate goal in the team's Mid-American Conference Championship semifinal loss against the West Virginia Mountaineers. He was named to the All-MAC Tournament Team as a freshman. In his sophomore season, he was converted to a centre-back, after having previously playing as a holding midfielder. That season, he was named to the All-MAC First Team, the All-North Region Second Team, and was an Academic All-MAC selection. In his junior season, he was named to the All-MAC Second Team, and was an Academic All-MAC.

In his senior season, he scored eight goals (including five game-winning goals. He was named MAC Player of the Year and named to the All-MAC First Team. He was also named to the All-North Region First Team, as well as being named a 2022 NCAA Division I Men's All-American Second Team. He was also an Academic All-MAC selection and Scholar All-American First Team. Over his four seasons with the Broncos, he scored 12 goals and added seven assists.

== Club career ==
In 2019, he made his senior debut with Harrogate Town in a cup competition.

In 2021, Nimick played with Grand Rapids FC in USL League Two. In 2022, he joined fellow USL2 club South Bend Lions FC.

In December 2022, he was selected in the second-round (42nd overall) in the 2023 MLS SuperDraft by Vancouver Whitecaps FC. In training camp, he was assigned to train with the second team, Whitecaps FC 2 of MLS Next Pro, but chose not to sign with them.

In February 2023, he signed a one-year contract, with a club option for 2024, with Canadian Premier League club HFX Wanderers FC. In doing so, Nimick became the first player from Newfoundland and Labrador to sign for a club in the league. He made his professional debut on April 15, 2023, in a league match against Atlético Ottawa, before being named to the CPL Team of the Week following the match. On June 30, he scored his first goal, netting a penalty kick during stoppage time to give the Wanderers a 2–1 victory over Forge FC. After scoring his fourth goal of the season on August 26, he was named the CPL Player of the Week. He was subsequently named the CPL Player of the Month for August. At the end of the season, he was nominated for the league's Defender of the Year award, as well as the Players' Player of the Year award, and was named to the CPL Best XI. For the 2024 season, Nimick was named an assistant captain for HFX Wanderers. On July 18, 2024, he scored two penalties, before being denied another one by Jonathan Viscosi, in a 3–1 league victory over Valour FC. He departed the club following the 2024 season.

In January 2025, he signed with Forge FC on a multi-year contract. He was named the league's Player of the Month for June 2025. At the end of the 2025 season, he was named the league's Defender of the Year.

== Career statistics ==
As of November 3, 2025

Club	Season	League			Playoffs		Domestic Cup		Other		Total	
Club	Season	Division	Apps	Goals	Apps	Goals	Apps	Goals	Apps	Goals	Apps	Goals
Harrogate Town	2018–19	National League	0	0	0	0	0	0	1	0	1	0
Grand Rapids FC	2021	USL League Two	11	1	–		–		–		11	1
South Bend Lions	2022	USL League Two	9	3	1	0	–		–		10	3
HFX Wanderers	2023	Canadian Premier League	27	6	1	0	1	0	–		29	6
HFX Wanderers	2024	Canadian Premier League	24	8	–		1	1	–		25	9
HFX Wanderers	Total		51	14	1	0	2	1	0	0	54	15
Forge FC	2025	Canadian Premier League	28	2	2	0	5	0	2	0	37	2
Career total			99	20	4	0	7	1	3	0	113	21

== Honours ==
Forge FC

- CPL Shield: 2025
- Canadian Championship: 2026
