= Amadou Koné (soccer, born January 2005) =

Canadian soccer player (born 2005)

Personal information
- Date of birth: January 28, 2005 (age 21)
- Place of birth: Ottawa, Ontario, Canada
- Height: 6 ft 0 in (1.83 m)
- Position: Forward

Team information
- Current team: Forge FC
- Number: 41

Youth career
- West Ottawa SC

College career
Years	Team	Apps	(Gls)
2023	Carleton Ravens	12	(1)

Senior career*
Years	Team	Apps	(Gls)
2024–	Forge FC	28	(1)
2024–	→ Sigma FC (loan)	8	(1)
- * Club domestic league appearances and goals as of November 3, 2025

Amadou Koné (born January 28, 2005) is a Canadian professional soccer player who plays for Canadian Premier League club Forge FC.

== Early life ==
Koné played youth soccer with West Ottawa SC.

== University career ==
In 2023, Koné began attending Carleton University, where he played for the men's soccer team. In his first year, he scored one goal and added three assists in the regular season, before appearing in all three of their OUA playoff games. He was the team's nominee for the school's rookie of the year award.

== Club career ==
At the 2024 CPL-U Sports Draft, Koné was selected in the second round (16th overall) by Forge FC. Ahead of their 2024 CONCACAF Champions Cup matches in February, he signed a short-term contract with the club. In April 2024, he signed a U Sports contract for the 2024 season with the club, allowing him to maintain his university eligibility. He made his debut on April 13 against Cavalry FC. In August 2024, he extended his U Sports contract with the club for the rest of the season, rather than to return to university. In April 2025, he signed another U Sports contract with the club. In August 2025, he once again extended his U Sports contract for the remainder of the season.

== Career statistics ==
As of November 3, 2025

Club	Season	League			Playoffs		National Cup		Other		Total	
Club	Season	Division	Apps	Goals	Apps	Goals	Apps	Goals	Apps	Goals	Apps	Goals
Forge FC	2024	Canadian Premier League	17	0	1	0	1	0	0	0	19	0
Forge FC	2025	Canadian Premier League	11	1	0	0	1	0	1	0	13	1
Forge FC	Total		28	1	1	0	2	0	1	0	32	1
Sigma FC (loan)	2024	League1 Ontario Premier	7	1	—		—		0	0	7	1
Sigma FC (loan)	2025	League1 Ontario Premier	1	0	—		—		0	0	8	1
Sigma FC (loan)	Total		8	1	0	0	0	0	0	0	8	1
Career total			36	2	1	0	2	0	1	0	40	2
