= Dino Bontis =

Canadian soccer player (born 2004)

Personal information
- Date of birth: August 3, 2004 (age 22)
- Place of birth: Hamilton, Ontario, Canada
- Height: 1.83 m (6 ft 0 in)
- Position: Goalkeeper

Team information
- Current team: Forge FC

Youth career
- Hamilton Sparta SC
- Toronto FC

College career
Years	Team	Apps	(Gls)
2022–2024	Western Mustangs	28	(0)

Senior career*
Years	Team	Apps	(Gls)
2021	Toronto FC III	1	(0)
2022	Forge FC	0	(0)
2022	→ Sigma FC (loan)	13	(0)
2023	Sigma FC	11	(0)
2024–	Forge FC	6	(0)
2024–2025	→ Sigma FC (loan)	25	(0)

International career^{‡}
2019	Canada U15	4	(0)
2022	Canada U20	1	(0)
- * Club domestic league appearances and goals as of October 25, 2026 ‡ National team caps and goals as of April 15, 2022

Dino Bontis (born August 3, 2004) is a Canadian professional soccer player who plays as a goalkeeper for Forge FC in the Canadian Premier League.

== Early life ==
Bontis began playing youth soccer at age three with Hamilton Sparta SC. He later joined the Toronto FC Academy, when he won the Golden Glove award as top goalkeeper at the 2017 U13 Concacaf Club Championships.

== University career ==
In 2022, Bontis began attending the University of Western Ontario, where he played for the men's soccer team.

== Club career ==
In 2021, Bontis played with Toronto FC III in the League1 Ontario Summer Championship.

In April 2022, he signed a developmental contract with Forge FC in the Canadian Premier League. He spent the majority of the season with their League1 Ontario affiliate Sigma FC.

In 2023, he played with Sigma FC in League1 Ontario.

In January 2024, he signed a short-term contract with Forge, ahead of their 2024 CONCACAF Champions Cup matches. In April 2024, he signed a U Sports contract with Forge, allowing him to maintain his university eligibility. He continued to play with their affiliate Sigma FC as well. In August 2024, he departed the club to return to university, with the club retaining his U Sports rights. In April 2025, he signed another U Sports contract with the club. On July 5, 2025, he made his debut for Forge, in a 2-1 victory over Vancouver FC, but needed to be substituted in the 89th minute due to injury (Vancouver's goal occurred after his substitution). In August 2025, he departed the club to return to university, per the terms of his U Sports contract, with the club retaining his rights for the 2026 season. However, a few weeks later, he returned to Forge, signing a multi-year professional contract.

== International career ==
In June 2019, Bontis debuted in the Canada Soccer program, attending a camp with the Canada U15 team. He was subsequently named to the roster for the 2019 CONCACAF Boys' Under-15 Championship.

In April 2022, he was called up to a camp with the Canada U20. In June 2022, he was named to the squad for the 2022 CONCACAF U-20 Championship.

== Personal life ==
Bontis is the son of Canadian academic and former Canada Soccer President Nick Bontis.

== Career statistics ==
As of August 15, 2025

Club	Season	League			Playoffs		Domestic Cup		League Cup		Continental		Total	
Club	Season	Division	Apps	Goals	Apps	Goals	Apps	Goals	Apps	Goals	Apps	Goals	Apps	Goals
Toronto FC III	2021	League1 Ontario Summer Championship	1	0	—		—		—		–		1	0
Forge FC	2022	Canadian Premier League	0	0	0	0	0	0	—		0	0	0	0
Sigma FC (loan)	2022	League1 Ontario	13	0	—		—		—		–		13	0
Sigma FC	2023	League1 Ontario	11	0	—		—		—		–		11	0
Forge FC	2024	Canadian Premier League	0	0	0	0	0	0	—		0	0	0	0
Forge FC	2025	Canadian Premier League	1	0	0	0	0	0	—		0	0	1	0
Forge FC	Total		1	0	0	0	0	0	0	0	0	0	1	0
Sigma FC (loan)	2024	League1 Ontario Premier	17	0	—		—		0	0	—		17	0
Sigma FC (loan)	2025	League1 Ontario Premier	7	0	—		—		0	0	—		7	0
Sigma FC (loan)	Total		24	0	0	0	0	0	0	0	0	0	24	0
Career total			50	0	0	0	0	0	0	0	0	0	50	0
