= Maxime Filion =

Canadian soccer player (born 2003)

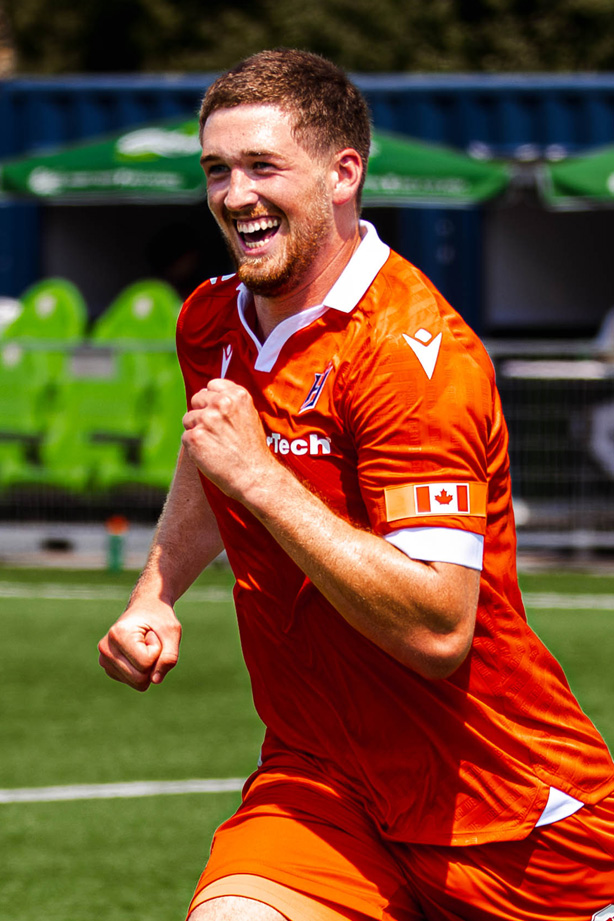

Personal information
- Date of birth: April 13, 2003 (age 23)
- Place of birth: Rockland, Ontario, Canada
- Position: Forward

Youth career
- Rockland United SC
- Ottawa TFC
- Ottawa Futuro

College career
Years	Team	Apps	(Gls)
2022–	Montreal Carabins		

Senior career*
Years	Team	Apps	(Gls)
2021	Ottawa South United	5	(0)
2025	Forge FC	30	(5)
2025	→ Sigma FC (loan)	2	(0)
- * Club domestic league appearances and goals as of October 25, 2026

Maxime Filion (born April 13, 2003) is a Canadian soccer player.

== Early life ==
Filion began playing youth soccer at age 10 in a house league in Rockland, Ontario. He later played youth soccer with Ottawa TFC.

== University career ==
Filion attended the Université de Montréal, where he played for the men's soccer team. In September 2024, he was named the RSEQ Student-Athlete of the Week. In 2024, he was named an RSEQ First Team All-Star.

== Club career ==
In 2021, he played with Ottawa South United in the Première ligue de soccer du Québec.

In 2022 and 2023, Maxime played for West Ottawa Soccer Club's Mens Premier team in the OCSL (Ottawa Carleton Soccer League).

At the 2025 CPL–U Sports Draft, Filion was selected in the second round (15th overall) by Forge FC. In February 2025, he signed a short-term contract with Forge ahead of the CONCACAF Champions Cup matches. On February 5, 2025, he made his professional debut in a substitute appearance against Mexican club Monterrey. In April 2025, he signed U Sports contract with the club, allowing him to maintain his university eligibility. On July 5, 2025, he scored his first goal in a 2–1 victory over Vancouver FC. In August 2025, he departed the club to return to university, per the terms of his U Sports contract, with the club retaining his rights for the 2026 season.

== Personal life ==
Filion is in a relationship with fellow soccer player Florence Belzile.

== Career statistics ==
As of August 15, 2025

Club	Season	League			Playoffs		Domestic Cup		Continental		Other		Total	
Club	Season	Division	Apps	Goals	Apps	Goals	Apps	Goals	Apps	Goals	Apps	Goals	Apps	Goals
Ottawa South United	2021	Première ligue de soccer du Québec	5	0	–		–		–		–		5	0
Forge FC	2025	Canadian Premier League	15	3	0	0	3	0	2	0	–		20	3
Sigma FC (loan)	2025	League1 Ontario	2	0	–		–		–		–		2	0
Career total			22	3	0	0	3	0	2	0	0	0	27	3
