= Keito Lipovschek =

Canadian soccer player (born 2005)

Personal information
- Full name: Keito Umaya Lipovschek
- Date of birth: April 3, 2005 (age 21)
- Place of birth: Guelph, Ontario, Canada
- Height: 1.83 m (6 ft 0 in)
- Position: Midfielder

Team information
- Current team: Forge FC
- Number: 28

Youth career
- Rockwood FC
- Guelph SC
- Cambridge United
- 2022–2023: Fleetwood Town

Senior career*
Years	Team	Apps	(Gls)
2023–2024	Fleetwood United		
2024–2025	Gulf United FC	5	(0)
2025–	Forge FC	4	(0)
2025–	→ Sigma FC (loan)	14	(2)
- * Club domestic league appearances and goals as of November 3, 2025

Keito Uyama Lipovschek (born April 3, 2005) is a Canadian soccer player who plays for Forge FC in the Canadian Premier League.

== Early life ==
Lipovschek played youth soccer with Rockwood FC, Guelph SC, and Cambridge United.

At age 17, whilst a student at Rossall School in the North West of England, he joined the youth system of English club Fleetwood Town, where he spent eighteen months, after participating in an identification camp in Canada. While in England, he also played for the Independent Schools Football Association U17 and U18 teams.

== Club career ==
In 2023, Lipovschek signed his first professional contract with UAE Second Division League club Fleetwood United, the sister club of English club Fleetwood Town. In 2024, he signed with Gulf United FC in the UAE First Division League.

In February 2025, he signed with Forge FC of the Canadian Premier League. He also spent time with their affiliate, Sigma FC, in League1 Ontario.
