= Ben Paton (soccer) =

Canadian soccer player (born 2000)

Personal information
- Full name: Benjamin Alan Paton
- Date of birth: 5 May 2000 (age 26)
- Place of birth: Kitchener, Ontario, Canada
- Height: 1.70 m (5 ft 7 in)
- Position: Midfielder

Team information
- Current team: Forge FC
- Number: 6

Youth career
- Kitchener SC
- 2016–2021: Blackburn Rovers

Senior career*
Years	Team	Apps	(Gls)
2021–2024	Ross County	17	(0)
2025–	Forge FC	53	(5)

International career
2016	Canada U17	2	(0)
- * Club domestic league appearances and goals as of October 25, 2026

Benjamin Alan Paton (born May 5, 2000) is a Canadian professional soccer player who plays as a midfielder for Canadian Premier League club Forge FC.

== Club career ==
=== Early career ===
In 2016, Paton joined the youth academy of Blackburn Rovers, after trialing the year previous. In March 2018 Blackburn signed Paton to a professional contract. In June 2021 it was announced that Paton would not be retained by the club.

=== Ross County ===
On July 8, 2021 Scottish Premiership club Ross County announced they had signed Paton to a deal, joining his older brother Harry. He made his professional debut for The Staggies on August 22 against Rangers.

In January 2023 Paton suffered a cruciate ligament injury during a training session, ruling him out for nine months. In January 2024, Ross County announced he had left the club following the expiration of his contract.

=== Forge FC ===
On 4 February 2025, Paton returned to Canada, signing with Canadian Premier League side Forge FC.

== International career ==
Paton has represented Canada at the under-17 level and was part of a squad that faced Jamaica in November 2016.

== Personal life ==
Ben Paton's older brother, Harry, is also a professional soccer player.

== Career statistics ==
As of match played January 2, 2023

Appearances and goals by club, season and competition
Club	Season	League			Playoffs		National Cup		League Cup		Continental		Total	
Club	Season	Division	Apps	Goals	Apps	Goals	Apps	Goals	Apps	Goals	Apps	Goals	Apps	Goals
Ross County	2021–22	Scottish Premiership	10	0	—		1	0	0	0	—		11	0
Ross County	2022–23	Scottish Premiership	7	0	—		0	0	4	0	—		11	0
Ross County	2023–24	Scottish Premiership	0	0	—		0	0	0	0	—		0	0
Ross County	Total		17	0	0	0	1	0	4	0	—		22	0
Forge FC	2025	Canadian Premier League	25	1	0	0	3	0	—		2	0	30	1
Career total			42	1	0	0	4	0	4	0	2	0	52	1
