= 2026 Canadian Championship =

Canadian men's soccer tournament

Championnat canadien 2026 (French)

Tournament details
- Country: Canada
- Date: May 5 – October 21
- Teams: 15 (from 6 leagues)

Final positions
- Champions: Forge FC (1st title)
- Runners-up: CF Montréal

Tournament statistics
- Matches played: 20
- Goals scored: 62 (3.1 per match)
- Attendance: 115,909 (5,795 per match)
- Top goal scorer: Ballou Tabla (4 goals)

Awards
- George Gross Memorial Trophy: Dimitry Bertaud
- Best young player: Jeevan Badwal

The 2026 Canadian Championship (French: Championnat canadien 2026) was the 19th edition of the Canadian Championship, the premier men's domestic cup competition in Canadian soccer, and the 25th competition for the Voyageurs Cup.

The tournament featured all 11 professional men's clubs in Canada—three from Major League Soccer and eight from the Canadian Premier League—along with the four 2025 semi-professional regional champions of the Premier Soccer Leagues Canada. This edition marked debut appearances of Calgary Blizzard SC, Langley United, FC Supra du Québec, and Woodbridge Strikers.

Vancouver Whitecaps FC entered the competition as four-time defending champions, but they were eliminated in the semi-finals by CF Montréal.

Forge FC defeated CF Montréal on penalties in the final, becoming the first Canadian Premier League team to win the tournament and just the second non-MLS side to do so after the Montreal Impact in 2008 (who still played in the USL at the time). As winners, they qualified for the 2027 CONCACAF Champions Cup.

== Format ==
The format for the 2026 tournament largely followed previous years. Seeding was determined using an expanded Canadian Championship ranking index, which evaluated teams based on their performance in the tournament over the previous four years, with recent results weighted more heavily. New for 2026, the four highest ranked teams were assigned positions in the bracket to guarantee that they could not face each other until the semi-finals. The tournament implemented football video support (FVS) for the first time, only used for the semi-finals and final.

The tournament consisted of four rounds. The preliminary round and final were single matches while the quarter-finals and semi-finals consisted of two-legged ties. For each round, draws were settled by extra time and, if required, a penalty shoot-out.

A player or team official was automatically suspended for the next match for the following offences:

- Receiving a red card (suspensions could be extended for serious offences);
- Accumulation of yellow cards in the tournament (three for players, two for team officials), (Note: As yellow cards were not carried forward to penalty shoot-outs, players or team officials could be shown two yellow cards in the same match without being sent off. However, these would still both count towards accumulation of yellow cards during the tournament.) with the exception that yellow card accumulation suspensions did not apply to the final.

== Teams ==
2026 Canadian Championship (Canada)
Montreal area clubs: CF Montréal; FC Supra du Québec; CS Saint-Laurent
Toronto area clubs: Toronto FC; Inter Toronto FC; Woodbridge Strikers
Vancouver area clubs: Vancouver Whitecaps FC; Vancouver FC; Langley United
Calgary area clubs: Cavalry FC; Calgary Blizzard SC

Canadian Premier League Major League Soccer Premier Soccer Leagues Canada

Rank	League	Team	Location	Entry round	App.	Previous best (last)
1	Major League Soccer	Vancouver Whitecaps FC	Vancouver, British Columbia	Quarter-finals	18th	Winners (2025)
2	Canadian Premier League	Forge FC	Hamilton, Ontario	Preliminary round	8th	Runners-up (2020)
3	Major League Soccer	Toronto FC	Toronto, Ontario	Preliminary round	19th	Winners (2020)
4	Major League Soccer	CF Montréal	Montreal, Quebec	Preliminary round	18th	Winners (2021)
5	Canadian Premier League	Pacific FC	Langford, British Columbia	Preliminary round	7th	Semi-finals (2024)
6	Canadian Premier League	Atlético Ottawa	Ottawa, Ontario	Preliminary round	6th	Semi-finals (2025)
7	Canadian Premier League	Vancouver FC	Langley, British Columbia	Preliminary round	4th	Runners-up (2025)
8	Canadian Premier League	Inter Toronto FC	Toronto, Ontario	Preliminary round	7th	Semi-finals (2022)
9	Canadian Premier League	Cavalry FC	Foothills County, Alberta	Preliminary round	7th	Semi-finals (2019)
10	Canadian Premier League	HFX Wanderers FC	Halifax, Nova Scotia	Preliminary round	7th	Quarter-finals (2022)
11	Canadian Premier League	FC Supra du Québec	Laval, Quebec	Preliminary round	1st	—
12	Premier Soccer Leagues Canada (regional champions)	Langley United (BCPL)	Langley, British Columbia	Preliminary round	1st	—
13	Premier Soccer Leagues Canada (regional champions)	CS Saint-Laurent (LS Pro)	Montreal, Quebec	Preliminary round	2nd	Quarter-finals (2024)
14	Premier Soccer Leagues Canada (regional champions)	Woodbridge Strikers (OPL)	Vaughan, Ontario	Preliminary round	1st	—
15	Premier Soccer Leagues Canada (regional champions)	Calgary Blizzard SC (APL)	Calgary, Alberta	Preliminary round	1st	—

== Schedule ==
Round	First leg	Second leg
Preliminary round	May 5–10	
Quarter-finals	July 8	July 12–13 and August 11
Semi-finals	September 1–2	September 15–16
Final	October 21	

== Draw ==
The draw was held on January 17, 2026. As defending champions, Vancouver Whitecaps FC were awarded a bye to the quarter-finals. Unlike previous years, a second draw was not held before the semi-finals. The four highest ranked teams were newly pre-assigned positions in the bracket such that they could not face each other until at least the semi-finals. As determined by the draw, the winner of series 5 (i.e. the mostly-western half of the bracket) hosted the final.

Pot 1 (seeded)	Pot 2 (west)	Pot 3 (east)
Vancouver Whitecaps FC; Forge FC; Toronto FC; CF Montréal	Pacific FC; Vancouver FC; Cavalry FC; Langley United; Calgary Blizzard SC	Atlético Ottawa; Inter Toronto FC; HFX Wanderers FC; FC Supra du Québec; CS Saint-Laurent; Woodbridge Strikers

== Bracket ==
Preliminary round single match
Langford, BC
CPL	Pacific FC	1
CPL	Cavalry FC	3
Montreal, QC
MLS	CF Montréal	5
APL	Calgary Blizzard SC	0
Langley, BC
CPL	Vancouver FC	2
BCPL	Langley United	0
Hamilton, ON
CPL	Forge FC	4
CPL	HFX Wanderers FC	0
Toronto (York Lions), ON
CPL	Inter Toronto FC	0
LS Pro	CS Saint-Laurent	1
Toronto (BMO), ON
MLS	Toronto FC	1
CPL	Atlético Ottawa	3
Laval, QC
CPL	FC Supra du Québec	3
OPL	Woodbridge Strikers	1

Quarter-finals two-legged tie
MLS	Vancouver Whitecaps FC	4	1	5
CPL	Cavalry FC	1	1	2
MLS	CF Montréal	2	2	4
CPL	Vancouver FC	1	1	2
CPL	Forge FC	1	2	3
LS Pro	CS Saint-Laurent	1	1	2
CPL	Atlético Ottawa	1	3	4
CPL	FC Supra du Québec	3	3	6

Semi-finals two-legged tie
MLS	Vancouver Whitecaps FC	1	1	2
MLS	CF Montréal	1	2	3
CPL	Forge FC	1	1	2
CPL	FC Supra du Québec	1	0	1

Final single match
Montreal, QC
MLS	CF Montréal	1 (2)
CPL	Forge FC (p)	1 (4)

== Preliminary round ==
The team with the higher ranking hosted the match.

=== Summary ===
Home team	Score	Away team
Toronto FC	1–3	Atlético Ottawa
CF Montréal	5–0	Calgary Blizzard SC
FC Supra du Québec	3–1	Woodbridge Strikers
Forge FC	4–0	HFX Wanderers FC
Pacific FC	1–3	Cavalry FC
Inter Toronto FC	0–1	CS Saint-Laurent
Vancouver FC	2–0	Langley United

Bye: Vancouver Whitecaps FC

=== Matches ===
May 5
7:30 pm EDT

Toronto FC	1–3	Atlético Ottawa
Kerr 16'	Report	Tabla 71', 81', 90+6' (pen.)

BMO Field, Toronto, Ontario
Attendance: 11,627
Referee: Scott Bowman

May 6
7:30 pm EDT

CF Montréal	5–0	Calgary Blizzard SC
Losenko 18'; Ríos 45'; Carmona 46'; Jaime 66'; Amaya 70'	Report

Saputo Stadium, Montreal, Quebec
Attendance: 10,166
Referee: Renzo Villanueva

May 8
6:00 pm EDT

FC Supra du Québec	3–1	Woodbridge Strikers
Abzi 16' (pen.); Sissoko 41'; Choinière 78'	Report	Spizzirri 29'

Stade Boréale, Laval, Quebec
Attendance: 1,300
Referee: Mathieu Souaré

May 9
4:00 pm EDT

Forge FC	4–0	HFX Wanderers FC
Borges 44', 51'; Batisse 45+2'; Wright 54'	Report

Hamilton Stadium, Hamilton, Ontario
Attendance: 3,865
Referee: Yusri Rudolf

May 9
4:00 pm PDT

Pacific FC	1–3	Cavalry FC
Belluz 78'	Report	Klomp 24'; Warschewski 88' (pen.); Baldisimo 90+4'

Starlight Stadium, Langford, British Columbia
Attendance: 2,043
Referee: Alain Ruch

May 10
3:00 pm EDT

Inter Toronto FC	0–1	CS Saint-Laurent
	Report	Chibane 18'

York Lions Stadium, Toronto, Ontario
Attendance: 817
Referee: Carly Shaw-MacLaren

May 10
3:00 pm PDT

Vancouver FC	2–0	Langley United
Field 74'; Mezquida 88'	Report

Willoughby Stadium, Langley, British Columbia
Attendance: 2,986
Referee: Iwan-Nikita Jecanski

== Quarter-finals ==
=== Summary ===
Team 1	Agg.	Team 2	1st leg	2nd leg
Vancouver Whitecaps FC	5–2	Cavalry FC	4–1	1–1
Vancouver FC	2–4	CF Montréal	1–2	1–2
CS Saint-Laurent	2–3	Forge FC	1–1	2–1
FC Supra du Québec	6–4	Atlético Ottawa	3–1	3–3

=== Matches ===
July 8
7:30 pm PDT

Vancouver Whitecaps FC	4–1	Cavalry FC
Pearlman 2' (o.g.); Müller 61'; White 63'; Elloumi 75'	Report	Klomp 45'

Swangard Stadium, Burnaby, British Columbia (Note: Typically, the team with the higher ranking hosted the second match; however, the order of the legs was reversed due to scheduling conflicts. BC Place was unavailable for both legs due to the 2026 FIFA World Cup and Swangard Stadium was only available for the first leg.)
Attendance: 5,086
Referee: Yusri Rudolf
July 13
7:30 pm MDT

Cavalry FC	1–1	Vancouver Whitecaps FC
Musse 75'	Report	Gherasimencov 86'

ATCO Field, Foothills County, Alberta
Attendance: 6,012
Referee: Michael Venne

Vancouver Whitecaps FC won 5–2 on aggregate.

July 8
7:00 pm PDT

Vancouver FC	1–2	CF Montréal
Mezquida 54'	Report	Campagna 63' (o.g.); Owusu 90+2' (pen.)

Willoughby Stadium, Langley, British Columbia
Attendance: 1,803
Referee: Scott Bowman
July 12
7:30 pm EDT

CF Montréal	2–1	Vancouver FC
Craig 56'; Ríos 68'	Report	Doner 79'

Saputo Stadium, Montreal, Quebec
Attendance: 12,222
Referee: Robert D'Alesio

CF Montréal won 4–2 on aggregate.

July 8
3:00 pm EDT

CS Saint-Laurent	1–1	Forge FC
Bahous 56'	Report	Ampomah 15'

Stade Boréale, Laval, Quebec (Note: CS Saint-Laurent hosted their home leg at Stade Boréale as their normal home stadium, at Vanier College, was not equipped to host professional matches.)
Attendance: 950
Referee: Mathieu Souaré
July 12
4:00 pm EDT

Forge FC	2–1	CS Saint-Laurent
Wright 2'; Batisse 90+4'	Report	Aristilde 75'

Hamilton Stadium, Hamilton, Ontario
Attendance: 3,048
Referee: Renzo Villanueva

Forge FC won 3–2 on aggregate.

July 8
7:00 pm EDT

FC Supra du Québec	3–1	Atlético Ottawa
Choinière 29'; Rea 50'; Condé 83'	Report	Timoteo 86'

Stade Boréale, Laval, Quebec
Attendance: 1,718
Referee: Sebastian Noshinravani
August 11
7:00 pm EDT

Atlético Ottawa	3–3	FC Supra du Québec
Fleuriau Chateau 51', 74'; Tabla 90+5'	Report	Kwemi 9'; Condé 16'; Rea 55'

TD Place Stadium, Ottawa, Ontario
Attendance: 3,147
Referee: Renzo Villanueva

FC Supra du Québec won 6–4 on aggregate.

== Semi-finals ==
=== Summary ===
Team 1	Agg.	Team 2	1st leg	2nd leg
Vancouver Whitecaps FC	2–3	CF Montréal	1–1	1–2
FC Supra du Québec	1–2	Forge FC	1–1	0–1

=== Matches ===
September 2
7:00 pm PDT

Vancouver Whitecaps FC	1–1	CF Montréal
Gauld 72'	Report	Pereira 16'

BC Place, Vancouver, British Columbia (Note: Typically, the team with the higher ranking hosted the second match; however, the order of the legs was reversed for this matchup.)
Attendance: 18,437
Referee: Renzo Villanueva
September 16
7:00 pm EDT

CF Montréal	2–1	Vancouver Whitecaps FC
Owusu 30' (pen.), 45'	Report	Sabbi 90+1'

Saputo Stadium, Montreal, Quebec
Attendance: 10,333
Referee: Filip Dujic

CF Montréal won 3–2 on aggregate.

September 1
7:00 pm EDT

FC Supra du Québec	1–1	Forge FC
Condé 36'	Report	Krutzen 90+5'

Stade Boréale, Laval, Quebec
Attendance: 3,150
Referee: Yusri Rudolf
September 15
7:00 pm EDT

Forge FC	1–0	FC Supra du Québec
Paton 26'	Report

Hamilton Stadium, Hamilton, Ontario
Attendance: 3,118
Referee: Pierre-Luc Lauzière

Forge FC won 2–1 on aggregate.

== Final ==
The winner, Forge FC, qualified for the 2027 CONCACAF Champions Cup.

October 21, 2026
7:00 pm EDT

CF Montréal	1–1 (a.e.t.)	Forge FC
Ríos 49'	Report	Batisse 45+6'
Penalties
Owusu (penalty missed); Longstaff (penalty scored); Synchuk (penalty missed); Pereira (penalty scored)	2–4	(penalty scored) Borges; (penalty scored) Paton; (penalty missed) Krutzen; (penalty scored) Nimick; (penalty scored) James

Saputo Stadium, Montreal, Quebec
Attendance: 14,081
Referee: Michael Venne

== Top goalscorers ==
Team eliminated or did not play in this round.

Rank	Player	Team	Goals	By round					
Rank	Player	Team	Goals	PR	QF1	QF2	SF1	SF2	F
1	(Canada) Ballou Tabla	Atlético Ottawa	4	3	0	1			
2	(France) Antoine Batisse	Forge FC	3	1	0	1	0	0	1
2	(Canada) Ibrahim Condé	FC Supra du Québec	3	0	1	1	1	0	
2	(Ghana) Prince Owusu	CF Montréal	3	0	1	0	0	2	0
2	(Mexico) Daniel Ríos	CF Montréal	3	1	0	1	0	0	1
6	(Canada) Tristan Borges	Forge FC	2	2	0	0	0	0	0
6	(Canada) David Choinière	FC Supra du Québec	2	1	1	0	0	0	
6	(Canada) Nicolas Fleuriau Chateau	Atlético Ottawa	2	0	0	2			
6	(Netherlands) Daan Klomp	Calvary FC	2	1	1	0			
6	(Uruguay) Nicolás Mezquida	Vancouver FC	2	1	1	0			
6	(Canada) Sean Rea	FC Supra du Québec	2	0	1	1	0	0	
6	(Canada) Brian Wright	Forge FC	2	1	0	1	0	0	0

Source: FotMob, CanPL

== Awards ==
- George Gross Memorial Trophy: (Democratic Republic of the Congo) Dimitry Bertaud (Forge FC)
- Best Young Canadian Player Award: (Canada) Jeevan Badwal (Vancouver Whitecaps FC)

== See also ==
- 2026–27 W Canadian Championship
