= Zayne Bruno =

Canadian soccer player (born 2007)

Personal information
- Full name: Zayne Jesse Bruno
- Date of birth: January 23, 2007 (age 19)
- Place of birth: Mississauga, Ontario, Canada
- Height: 6 ft 1 in (1.85 m)
- Position: Midfielder

Team information
- Current team: Forge FC
- Number: 32

Youth career
- Sigma FC

Senior career*
Years	Team	Apps	(Gls)
2023	Sigma FC	3	(0)
2025–	Forge FC	7	(0)
2024–	→ Sigma FC (loan)	35	(1)
2024	→ Sigma FC B (loan)	12	(3)

International career^{‡}
2025	Canada U18	2	(1)
2025–	Canada U20	9	(2)
- * Club domestic league appearances and goals as of October 25, 2026 ‡ National team caps and goals as of August 8, 2026

Zayne Jesse Bruno (born January 23, 2007) is a Canadian soccer player who plays for Forge FC in the Canadian Premier League.

== Club career ==
In 2023, Bruno began playing with Sigma FC in League1 Ontario.

In February 2024, he signed a developmental contract with Forge FC in the Canadian Premier League. He also played with Sigma FC in 2024. In 2024, he was named a League2 Ontario All-Star while playing with Sigma FC B. In April 2025, he signed an Exceptional Young Player contract with Forge. He made his professional debut for Forge on April 5, 2025, starting the match against Cavalry FC, but was sent off in the 72nd minute after picking up his second yellow card of the match.

== International career ==
In August 2025, Bruno was called up to the Canada U18 team for a series of friendlies. In May 2026, he was named as a training player for the Canada senior team camp to support the roster ahead of the 2026 FIFA World Cup. He helped Canada's U20s reach the FIFA U20 World Cup after 20 years of not qualifying.
