= Forge FC =

Canadian professional soccer club based in Hamilton

- Full name: Forge Football Club
- Nickname: The Hammers
- Founded: May 6, 2017; 9 years ago
- Stadium: Hamilton Stadium, Hamilton, Ontario
- Capacity: 23,218
- Owner: Hamilton Sports Group
- Chairman: Bob Young
- Coach: Bobby Smyrniotis
- League: Canadian Premier League
- 2026: Regular season: 2nd Playoffs: Semifinals
- Website: www.cplsoccer.com/forgefc
Home colours	Away colours	Third colours

Forge FC (full name Forge Football Club), also known as Forge FC Hamilton, or Hamilton Forge FC, is a Canadian professional soccer club based in Hamilton, Ontario, that competes in the Canadian Premier League, the top tier of Canadian soccer. The club plays its home matches at Hamilton Stadium. Forge FC joined the CPL in 2019 as one of the league's seven inaugural teams.

The club is four-time CPL champions, winning back-to-back league titles in 2019 and 2020, before doing the same in 2022 and 2023. Forge was the first CPL side to compete in a continental competition when it played in the 2019 CONCACAF League, and the first to compete in the highest tier of continental competition in the 2022 CONCACAF Champions League. Forge became the first Canadian Premier League club to reach the final of the Canadian Championship, which they did in 2020. The club also became the first CPL team to win the Canadian Championship, winning in 2026.

== History ==
Hamilton was linked to a professional soccer team as early as June 2013, when reports first emerged of a professional soccer league launching in Canada. Hamilton Tiger-Cats owner Bob Young was part of a group of investors, predominantly from the Canadian Football League, working with the Canadian Soccer Association and president Victor Montagliani.

Young and CEO Bob Mitchell originally met with executives from the MLS, USL and NASL to launch a Hamilton team in an American league. Executives from the Ti-Cats showed that the local fans wouldn't be interested in watching teams from southern USA playing in Hamilton, and the costs of running a MLS team would be too high.

In February 2016, the ownership group sought permission from Hamilton City Council to erect a dome over the Tim Hortons Field playing surface to allow for year-long activity, including soccer. When the Canadian Premier League was officially announced, it was revealed that Hamilton's club would be the flagship franchise.

On May 6, 2017, Hamilton was one of two cities accepted by the Canadian Soccer Association for professional club membership when the Canadian Premier League was unanimously approved.

Forge FC was officially unveiled as the league's sixth team on July 12, 2018. The club revealed its crest, colours and branding, as well as its place in the league for the 2019 launch season. The name was chosen to represent city's industrial heritage and forging ahead building its future.

=== Bobby Smyrniotis era ===
On October 1, 2018, Forge FC announced that Bobby Smyrniotis would be its first head coach and technical director. On November 29, 2018, Kyle Bekker and Chris Nanco were announced by the club as its first signings, coinciding with event that consisted where each team unveiled its initial player signings.

==== 2019 season ====
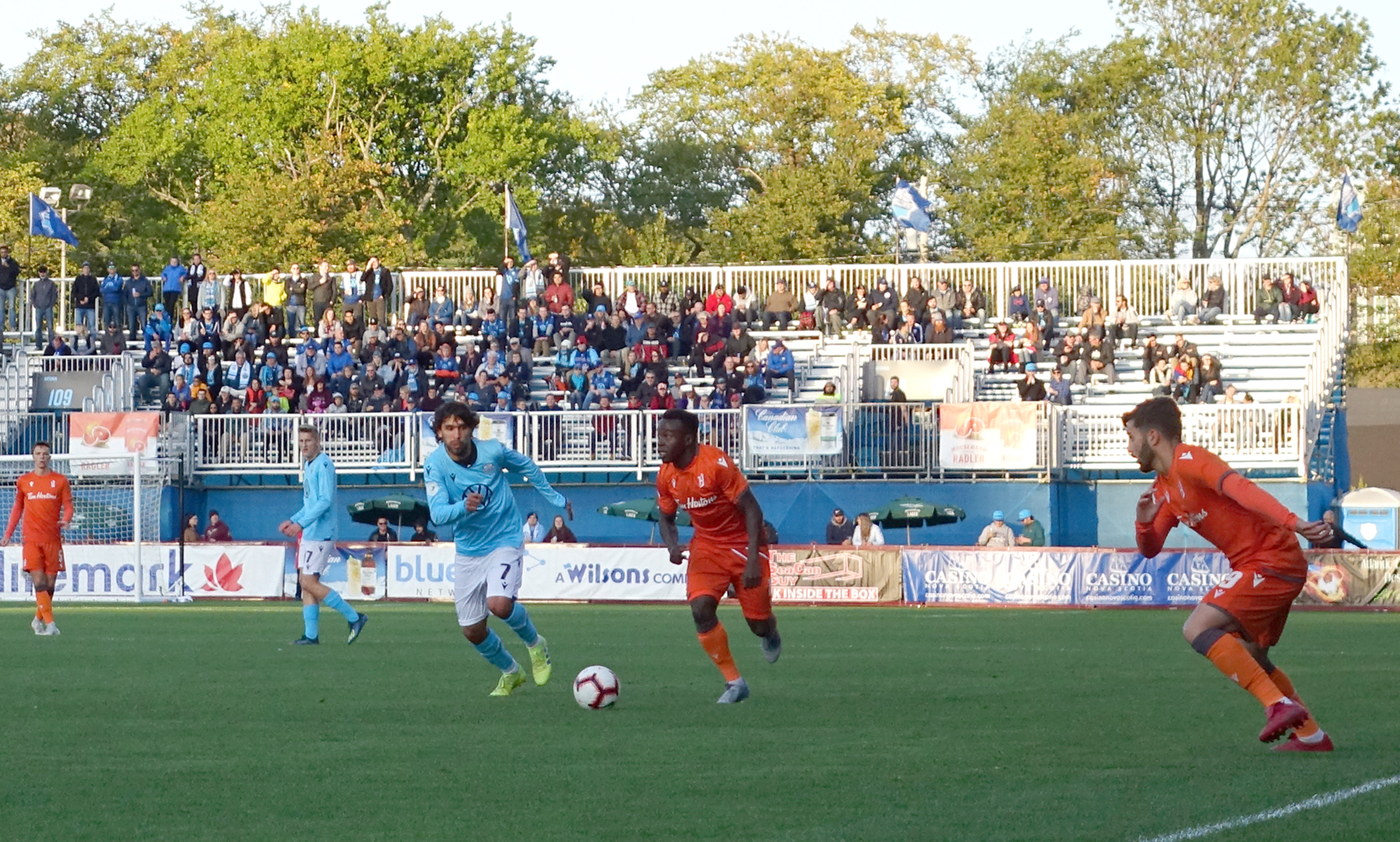
A game between Forge FC and HFX Wanderers FC during the 2019 CPL season

The club played its first ever game on April 27, 2019, in the CPL's inaugural match against York9 FC (now known as Inter Toronto FC). As one of the league's 'inaugural teams', the club competed against FC Edmonton and Valour FC for a spot in the 2019 CONCACAF League, qualifying after defeating Valour 2–0 on June 16, 2019. In their debut international match, Forge defeated Antigua GFC 2–1 on aggregate in the two-leg preliminary round series to advance to the round of 16. There, Forge FC was eliminated 4–2 on aggregate by Honduran club Olimpia.

Forge FC won the league championship in their inaugural season after defeating Cavalry FC 2–0 on aggregate in the 2019 CPL Finals. Golden Boot winner Tristan Borges scored the opening goal during the first leg on October 26 in Hamilton. David Choinière scored the final goal late in stoppage time during the second leg, held on November 2 in Calgary.

==== 2020 season ====
Due to the COVID-19 pandemic, the CPL delayed the 2020 Canadian Premier League season and played it as a shortened bubble tournament at the University of Prince Edward Island. There, Forge defended their title, defeating HFX Wanderers FC 2–0 in the CPL Final with goals from Alexander Achinioti-Jönsson and Maxim Tissot.

In the CONCACAF League, Forge defeated Municipal Limeño and Tauro in single-leg away matches before falling to Haitian club Arcahaie on penalties in the quarter-finals. The club had one final chance to qualify for the CONCACAF Champions League in a play-in match, but were defeated by Honduran club Marathón.

==== 2021 season ====
In the club's 2021 season, Forge competed in the CONCACAF League for a third consecutive season. This year, the club advanced to the semi-finals for the first time, coming from behind in the quarter-finals to defeat Santos de Guápiles 4–3 on aggregate to qualify for the 2022 CONCACAF Champions League. Domestically, Forge finished first in the CPL and qualified for the CPL Final, but were defeated 1–0 by Pacific FC, ending the club's quest for a third consecutive title.

==== 2022 season ====
On January 2, 2022, the club reorganized its ownership under the newly announced Hamilton Sports Group, an entity that also owns the Hamilton Tiger-Cats and the master licence for Tim Hortons Field. Bob Young continues to serve as chairman and the largest shareholder while also welcoming new investment from Hamilton-based steel company Stelco, club CEO Scott Mitchell, and Jim Lawson. On February 16, 2022, Forge FC became the first Canadian Premier League team to participate in the CONCACAF Champions League, hosting Cruz Azul in a 1–0 loss, and eliminated by them in the first round, 4–1 on aggregate.

During the CPL season, captain Kyle Bekker and four other players recorded their 100th match with the club. Each of these players was presented with a commemorative Forge jersey with the kit number 100 at a home match. On October 30, Forge FC defeated Atlético Ottawa 2–0 in the 2022 Canadian Premier League Final to claim their third CPL title.

==== 2023 season ====
In the spring of 2023, the club announced affiliations with ten local youth clubs, including League1 Ontario clubs: Sigma FC, Hamilton United, and St. Catharines Roma Wolves. In May, Forge signed head coach Bobby Smyrniotis to a four-year contract extension which also made him the club's sporting director.

Forge finished second at the end of the 2023 CPL regular season, qualifying for the play-offs once again; they eventually reached the final, which saw them lift their fourth league title through a 2–1 win over Cavalry FC at Tim Hortons Field.

==== 2024 season ====
In the Canadian Premier League, Forge were regular season winners for the second time, and the first time since the introduction of the CPL Shield. Forge reached the CPL Final for a sixth consecutive season but lost 2–1 to Cavalry FC.

==== 2025 season ====
Forge had a historic start to the 2025 Canadian Premier League season, which began with a record breaking 20 match unbeaten streak. This streak was part of a 22 match undefeated streak across all competitions. For the second consecutive season (and third time overall), Forge finished first place in the regular season and hoisted the CPL Shield. In the playoffs however, Forge fell short and did not reach the championship finals for the first time in league history, falling 0–1 at home to Cavalry FC in the semi-final.

==== 2026 season ====
On October 1, Kyle Bekker announced his retirement from professional soccer. Bekker had served as Forge captain since the inaugural season in 2019. Forge FC finished the 2026 season second in the table, two points behind Cavalry FC. They will face Atletico Ottawa in the playoffs semi-finals.

Forge won their first Canadian Championship in 2026, defeating CF Montréal 1–1 (4–2 on penalties) in the final. They were the first CPL team to win the tournament and the first to win all three domestic trophies available to CPL teams.

== Stadium ==
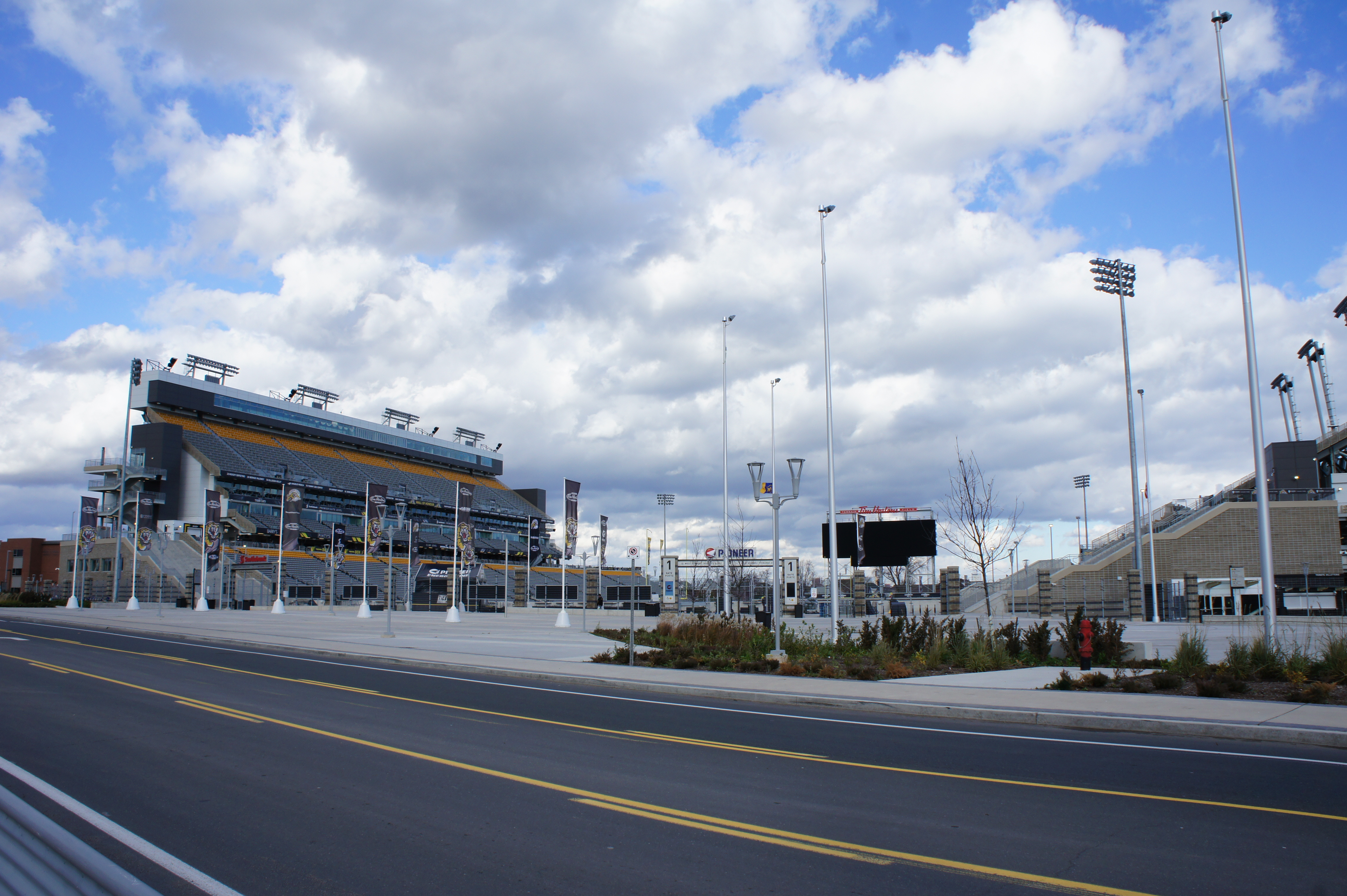
Hamilton Stadium is Forge FC's home stadium

The club plays its home games at Hamilton Stadium, a 23,218-seat multi-purpose stadium which is also used for Canadian football. In the inaugural season, capacity was reduced to only allow spectators in the lower decks and club and suite facilities to provide an intimate setting for supporters. In 2022 capacity has been reduced further with tickets available only in the east side lower deck and the club and suite levels except for matches with a high demand. Capacity was increased again for the 2026 season in response to league-best and club record average attendance in 2025, with west side lower deck seating being available to purchase at all regular season games in 2026 and 2027.

The stadium, then named Tim Hortons Field, opened in 2014 as the home venue for the Hamilton Tiger-Cats of the Canadian Football League, and was used as a soccer venue during the 2015 Pan American Games.

=== Stadiums during the COVID-19 pandemic ===
In response to the effects of the COVID-19 pandemic in Ontario, Forge played several home or neutral-site games during the 2020 and 2021 seasons behind closed doors in other venues.

Season	Stadium	Location	Competition	Games
2020	Alumni Field	Charlottetown, Prince Edward Island	2020 CPL season	6
2021	IG Field	Winnipeg, Manitoba	2021 CPL season	4
2021	Estadio Cuscatlán	San Salvador, El Salvador	2021 CONCACAF League	1

== Crest and colours ==
Forge secondary logo

The crest is designed to represent both an "H" for Hamilton and "F" for Forge. The open space in the lettering represents a waterfall, and the three orange sparks represent Forge FC's city, community and club.

The club's secondary crest is a hammer with the 'H' of the primary crest at the head, with six stripes on the handle to represent the six municipalities amalgamated in 2001 to form the new City of Hamilton: Dundas, Ancaster, Stoney Creek, Flamborough, Glanbrook, and of course, Hamilton.

The official club colours "spark orange", "platinum steel" grey, and "waterfall white", symbolizing the sparks that come from the strike of a hammer, the local manufacturing industry, and the area's many waterfalls. To celebrate Hamilton's founding date of June 9, 1846, Forge FC honoured the sporting colours worn by the Hamilton Tiger-Cats, the Hamilton Bulldogs, and the Hamilton Tigers by wearning a black and gold kit for its first ever June home game.

=== Kit history ===
Home, away, and third kits.

- Home

2019	2020	2021	2022	2023	2024	2025	2026

- Away

2019	2020–21	2022	2023	2024	2025	2026

- Third

2019	2026

=== Kit suppliers and shirt sponsors ===
Forge kits
Period	Kit manufacturer	Shirt sponsor (chest)	Shirt sponsor (sleeve)
2019–2022	Macron	Tim Hortons	None
2023–2024	Macron	Tim Hortons	CIBC
2025	Macron	WeatherTech Canada	None
2026–present	Hummel	WeatherTech Canada	Moneris

== Club culture ==
=== Supporters ===
The Barton St. Battalion is Forge FC's only recognized supporters' group. Located in section 112 of Tim Hortons Field, the group was founded in February 2016 after details of the Canadian Premier League and a Hamilton club emerged. At the club's official launch, supporters of the group sat behind the stage and were revealed as the club's first 75 founding members.

=== Mascot ===
The club mascot is Sparx, a large orange hammer-wielding dragon. He was unveiled to the public on April 18, 2019, before his debut at Forge FC's inaugural match on April 27, 2019.

=== The Anvil ===
Starting in the 2022 season, the club began celebrating home victories by having a prominent player from the match strike an anvil before the Barton St. Battalion.

=== Rivalries ===
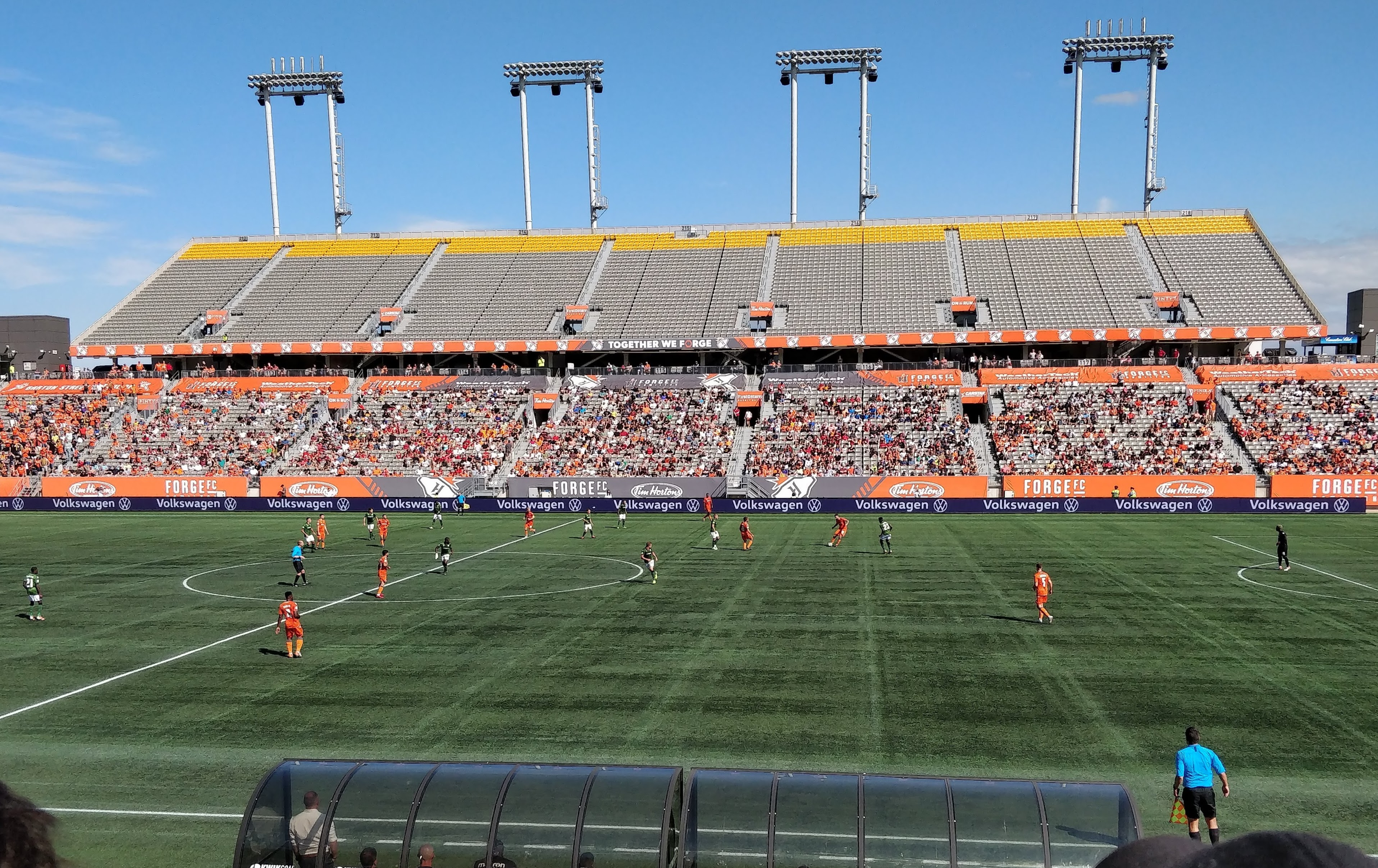
A game between Forge and Cavalry in August 2019

Forge has a rivalry with Inter Toronto FC, with matches between the two club referred to as 905 derbies. As two of the founding members of the Canadian Premier League, the clubs contested the league's inaugural league match on April 27, 2019 at Tim Hortons Field which ended in a 1–1 draw.

A competitive rivalry with Calgary-based Cavalry FC developed during the 2019 season, as the clubs broke out as the league's top teams and faced off nine times, including meetings in the Canadian Championship and the CPL Finals. The natural rivalry has been described as the best in the league.

== Honours ==
Forge FC honours
Type	Competition	Titles	Seasons
Domestic	Canadian Premier League	4	2019, 2020, 2022, 2023
Domestic	CPL Shield	3	2021, 2024, 2025
Domestic	Canadian Championship	1	2026

- record

=== Canadian Premier League Awards ===
Coach of the Year

- Bobby Smyrniotis: 2024, 2025

Defender of the Year

- Alexander Achinioti-Jönsson: 2022
- Daniel Nimick: 2025

Golden Boot

- Tristan Borges: 2019

Golden Glove

- Triston Henry: 2020, 2023
- Jassem Koleilat: 2025

Player of the Year

- Tristan Borges: 2019, 2024
- Kyle Bekker: 2020

Under 21 Canadian Player of the Year

- Tristan Borges: 2019
- Kwasi Poku: 2024

=== Canadian Championship Awards ===
George Gross Memorial Trophy

- Dimitry Bertaud: 2026

=== CONCACAF League Awards ===
Team of the Tournament

- Molham Babouli: 2021

== Players and staff ==
=== Roster ===
As of September 29, 2026

Note: Flags indicate national team as defined under FIFA eligibility rules; some limited exceptions apply. Players may hold more than one non-FIFA nationality.

No.	Pos.	Nation	Player
3	DF	SRB	Marko Jevremović
4	DF	NED	Daniël Krutzen
5	DF	CAN	Daniel Nimick
6	MF	CAN	Ben Paton
7	FW	ESP	Ismael Oketokoun
8	DF	FRA	Antoine Batisse
9	FW	CAN	Brian Wright
10	MF	CAN	Kyle Bekker (captain)
11	FW	GHA	Nana Ampomah
12	FW	CAN	Maxime Filion
14	FW	CAN	Levonte Johnson (on loan from Colorado Springs Switchbacks)
16	GK	COD	Dimitry Bertaud
17	FW	CAN	Hoce Massunda
18	FW	SYR	Molham Babouli

No.	Pos.	Nation	Player
19	FW	CAN	Tristan Borges
20	FW	CAN	Kevaughn Tavernier
22	MF	CAN	Noah Jensen
23	MF	CAN	Anthony Aromatario
24	DF	ALB	Rezart Rama
26	MF	CAN	Aghilas Sadek
28	MF	CAN	Keito Lipovschek
32	DF	CAN	Zayne Bruno
33	GK	CAN	Cuba Grant
36	GK	CAN	Dino Bontis
55	DF	CAN	Manjrekar James
64	MF	CAN	Khadim Kane
87	MF	CAN	Maxime Bourgeois
90	FW	CAN	Lucas Cavallini

=== Staff ===
As of September 28, 2026

Executive
Caretaker	(Canada) Bob Young
Chief executive officer	(Canada) Scott Mitchell
Executive vice president	Doug Rye
President	(Canada) Matt Afinec
Coaching staff
Head coach and sporting director	(Canada) Bobby Smyrniotis
Assistant coach	(Belgium) Peter Reynders
Goalkeeper coach and video analyst	(France) Johan Albert
Assistant coach	(Greece) George Kyriazis
Academy director and technical coach	John Zervos
Academy director and technical coach	Philip Opassinis
Director of soccer operations	(Guyana) Jelani Smith

=== Head coaches ===
As of November 9, 2025

Coach	Nation	Tenure	Record				
Coach	Nation	Tenure	G	W	D	L	Win %
Bobby Smyrniotis	Canada	October 1, 2018 – present	235	118	54	63	50.21

=== Club captains ===
Years	Name	Nation
2019–2026	Kyle Bekker	Canada

== Youth development ==
Forge FC operates a tiered youth structure consisting of development clubs and partner clubs. While both levels benefit from the Forge technical network, development clubs are deeply integrated into the first-team's tactical philosophy and scouting system, often serving as the primary source for professional signings. Partner clubs focus on grassroots growth, providing local youth players with technical training from Forge staff and a direct connection to the professional club.

=== Development clubs ===
==== Sigma FC ====
Forge FC has maintained a foundational relationship with Mississauga-based Sigma FC since 2018. Co-founded by Forge head coach Bobby Smyrniotis, Sigma serves as a primary pipeline, with over 25 graduates—including Kyle Bekker and Tristan Borges—signing professional terms with Forge. As an official development club, Forge utilizes the CPL's downward player movement to provide rostered players with competitive minutes in the Ontario Premier League.

==== Hamilton United ====
In March 2023, Hamilton United Elite was designated as an official development club. This partnership integrated the two organizations under a unified technical philosophy, with Hamilton United adopting Forge's "Spark Orange" and "Platinum Steel" colour palette for its competitive kits. The club operates teams in the Ontario Premier League, offering a direct local pathway into the professional ranks.

==== CS Mont-Royal Outremont ====
CS Mont-Royal Outremont (CSMRO) serves as a key development partner within the LS Pro Quebec system. This affiliation expands Forge's scouting and recruitment reach into the Quebec market, allowing for technical collaboration and the identification of high-potential talent within the province's semi-professional tier.

== Team records ==
=== Year-by-year ===
==== Key ====
Key to competitions:

- Canadian Premier League (CPL) – The top-flight of soccer in Canada, established in 2019.
- Canadian Championship (CC) – The premier knockout cup competition in Canadian soccer, first contested in 2008.
- CONCACAF Champions Cup – The premier club competition in North American soccer since 1962. It was named the CONCACAF Champions' Cup until 2008 and the CONCACAF Champions League from 2008 to 2023.
- CONCACAF League – The second-tier club competition in North American soccer from 2017 to 2022.

Key to colours and symbols:

1st or W	Winners
2nd or RU	Runners-up
3rd	Third place
†	Top attendance in league
♦	Top scorer in league

Key to league record:

- Pld = Matches played
- W = Matches won
- D = Matches drawn
- L = Matches lost
- GF = Goals scored
- GA = Goals against
- GD = Goal difference
- Pts = Points
- PPG = Points per game
- Pos = Final position

Key to cup record:

- DNQ = The club did not qualify
- R1 = Round one
- R2 = Round two
- R16 = Round of 16
- QF = Quarter-finals
- SF = Semi-finals
- RU = Runners-up
- W = Winners

==== Seasons ====
Season	League											Playoffs	CC	Continental		Average attendance (Note: Average attendance includes attendance from league matches only.)	Top goalscorer(s) (Note: Top goalscorer(s) includes all goals scored in league season, league playoffs, Canadian Championship, CONCACAF League, and CONCACAF Champions Cup/League matches.)	
Season	League	Pld	W	D	L	GF	GA	GD	Pts	PPG	Pos.	Playoffs	CC	Continental		Average attendance	Player(s)	Goals
2019	CPL	28	17	5	6	45	26	+19	56	2.00	2nd	W	R2	CONCACAF League	R16	6,872 †	(Canada) Tristan Borges	13 ♦
2020	CPL	10	5	4	1	17	10	+7	19	1.90	–	W	RU (Note: The 2020 Canadian Championship Final was played in June 2022 due to delays related to the COVID-19 pandemic.)	CONCACAF League	QF	N/A	(Belgium) Daniël Krutzen	4
2021	CPL	28	16	2	10	39	24	+15	50	1.79	1st	RU	SF	CONCACAF League	SF	4,335	(Canada) Molham Babouli	10
2022	CPL	28	14	5	9	47	25	+22	47	1.68	2nd	W	QF	Champions League	R16	3,456	(Canada) Woobens Pacius	13
2023	CPL	28	11	9	8	39	32	+7	42	1.50	2nd	W	SF	DNQ		5,318	(Canada) Woobens Pacius	11
2024	CPL	28	15	5	8	45	31	+14	50	1.79	1st	RU	SF	Champions Cup	R1	5,279	(Canada) Kwasi Poku	10
2025	CPL	28	16	10	2	51	22	+29	58	2.07	1st	SF	SF	Champions Cup	R1	6,932 †	(Canada) Brian Wright	14
2026	CPL	28	17	7	4	49	22	+27	58	2.07	2nd	SF	W	Champions Cup	R1			

=== International competition ===
The following is a list of results for Forge FC in international competitions. Forge FC's scores are listed first.

Year	Tournament	Round	Opponent	Home	Away	Agg.
2019	CONCACAF League	Preliminary Round	(Guatemala) Antigua	2–1	0–0	2–1
2019	CONCACAF League	Round of 16	(Honduras) Olimpia	1–0	1–4	2–4
2020	CONCACAF League	Preliminary Round	(El Salvador) Municipal Limeño		2–1	
2020	CONCACAF League	Round of 16	(Panama) Tauro		2–1	
2020	CONCACAF League	Quarter-finals	(Haiti) Arcahaie		1–1	
2020	CONCACAF League	Play-in Round	(Honduras) Marathón		0–1	
2021	CONCACAF League	Preliminary Round	(El Salvador) FAS	3–1	2–2	5–3
2021	CONCACAF League	Round of 16	(Panama) Independiente	0–0	2–0	2–0
2021	CONCACAF League	Quarter-finals	(Costa Rica) Santos de Guápiles	3–0	1–3	4–3
2021	CONCACAF League	Semi-finals	(Honduras) Motagua	2–2	0–0	2–2
2022	CONCACAF Champions League	Round of 16	(Mexico) Cruz Azul	0–1	1–3	1–4
2024	CONCACAF Champions Cup	Round One	(Mexico) Guadalajara	1–3	1–2	2–5
2025	CONCACAF Champions Cup	Round One	(Mexico) Monterrey	0–2	0–3	0–5
2026	CONCACAF Champions Cup	Round One	(Mexico) Tigres UANL	0–0	1–4	1–4
2027	CONCACAF Champions Cup	Round One	TBD			

== Player records ==
=== Most career goals ===
As of November 15, 2026

#	Pos.	Name	Nation	Career at club	Goals scored			
#	Pos.	Name	Nation	Career at club	CPL	CC	Int'l	Total
1	Midfielder	**Tristan Borges**	Canada	2019–2022, 2023–	38	4	1	**43**
2	Forward	Woobens Pacius	Haiti	2020–2023	29	3	0	**32**
3	Midfielder	David Choinière	Canada	2019–2025	23	3	5	**31**
4	Midfielder	Kyle Bekker	Canada	2019–2026	22	3	2	**27**
5	Forward	Brian Wright	Canada	2025–2026	16	4	1	**21**

Note: Bold indicates active player

=== Most career assists ===
As of November 15, 2026

#	Pos.	Name	Nation	Career at club	Goals assisted			
#	Pos.	Name	Nation	Career at club	CPL	CC	Int'l	Total
1	Midfielder	**Tristan Borges**	Canada	2019–2022, 2023–	37	2	3	**42**
2	Midfielder	Kyle Bekker	Canada	2019–2026	30	1	1	**32**
3	Midfielder	David Choinière	Canada	2019–2025	21	4	2	**27**
4	Midfielder	**Noah Jensen**	Canada	2020–	9	2	0	**11**
5	Forward	**Nana Ampomah**	Ghana	2024–	6	4	0	**10**

Note: Bold indicates active player

=== Most career appearances ===
As of November 15, 2026

#	Pos.	Name	Nation	Career at club	Games played			
#	Pos.	Name	Nation	Career at club	CPL	CC	Int'l	Total
1	Midfielder	Kyle Bekker	Canada	2019–2026	193	23	23	**239**
2	Midfielder	**Tristan Borges**	Canada	2019–2022, 2023–	181	24	18	**223**
3	Midfielder	Alexander Achinioti-Jönsson	Sweden	2019–2025	183	20	19	**222**
4	Midfielder	David Choinière	Canada	2019–2025	152	18	21	**191**
5	Defender	Dominic Samuel	Canada	2019–2024	127	13	19	**159**

Note: Bold indicates active player
