= CPL Shield =

Canadian soccer trophy

- League: Canadian Premier League
- Awarded for: Finishing the regular season with the best record

History
- First award: 2023; 2019 (retroactively)
- Most wins: Cavalry FC; Forge FC (3 shields each)
- Most recent: Cavalry FC (2026, 3rd shield)

The Canadian Premier League Shield or CPL Shield is a trophy awarded annually to the Canadian Premier League (CPL) club with the best regular season finish. Although this award does not signify a league championship, as that is decided during the Canadian Premier League Finals, the winning team is awarded an equal monetary prize to the eventual playoff champions, and a berth in the next season's CONCACAF Champions Cup.

== History ==
At the end of the 2022 season, the league announced that they would begin to recognize the regular season accomplishments of its member clubs to have more similarity with soccer competitions around the world, which put less emphasis on post-season results. At the time, the CPL did not recognize a regular season winner. The CPL Shield was first unveiled near the end of the 2023 regular season. Cavalry FC were the first team to hoist the trophy following their 2023 regular season championship. The CPL Shield was also awarded retroactively to the clubs with the best regular season records from all previous seasons, meaning that Cavalry FC were also the first de-facto winners of the trophy for their first place finish in the inaugural 2019 season. The 2019 season had a split season format with a 10 game spring season and an 18 game fall season, in which Cavalry FC led the league table in both phases. Due to the unconventional format used for a shortened season in 2020, due to the COVID-19 pandemic, the league did not retroactively award the trophy to any team for that year.

== Trophy ==
The trophy is a silver shield measuring about 46 centimetres (18 in) in diameter and weighing 9 kilograms (20 lb). The CPL Shield has 13 edges to represent each of the provinces and territories of Canada and features a gold CPL logo (which is a stylized maple leaf) in the centre. The trophy sits on a removable wooden base.

== Winners ==
The CPL Shield winner has home advantage in the first semi-final in the current play-off system. Notwithstanding, as of 2026, in the seven seasons where a CPL shield has been awarded, only Cavalry FC in 2026 has also won the overall league championship to attain the 'CPL double'. The most successful teams in this particular competition are Cavalry FC of Calgary and Forge FC of Hamilton with three victories each; only Atlético Ottawa in 2022 have broken the duopoly. In four of the seasons Forge did not win the CPL Shield, they won the overall championship for the North Star Cup, but have never both in the same season.

† – Trophy awarded retroactively

Season	Teams	Winner	Record							Playoff result	Coach
Season	Teams	Winner	Pld	W	D	L	Pts	Mar	PPG	Playoff result	Coach
2019 †	7	Cavalry FC	28	19	5	4	62	6	2.21	Runners-up	(England) Tommy Wheeldon Jr.
2020	8	Not awarded									
2021 †	8	Forge FC	28	16	2	10	50	0 (Note: 1st tiebreaker: total wins (+2))	1.79	Runners-up	(Canada) Bobby Smyrniotis
2022 †	8	Atlético Ottawa	28	13	10	5	49	2	1.75	Runners-up	(Spain) Carlos González
2023	8	Cavalry FC (2)	28	16	7	5	55	13	1.96	Runners-up	(England) Tommy Wheeldon Jr. (2)
2024	8	Forge FC (2)	28	15	5	8	50	2	1.79	Runners-up	(Canada) Bobby Smyrniotis (2)
2025	8	Forge FC (3)	28	16	10	2	58	2	2.07	Second semifinal	(Canada) Bobby Smyrniotis (3)
2026	8	Cavalry FC (3)	28	18	6	4	60	2	2.14	Champions	(England) Tommy Wheeldon Jr. (3)

== Records ==
=== Shield wins by club ===
Team	Winners	Runners-up	Year(s) won	Year(s) runners-up
Forge FC	3	4	2021, 2024, 2025	2019, 2022, 2023, 2026
Cavalry FC	3	2	2019, 2023, 2026	2021, 2024
Atlético Ottawa	1	1	2022	2025

=== Winner's records in the CONCACAF Champions Cup ===
Starting in 2023, the CPL Shield winner earned a berth to represent Canada in the following year's CONCACAF Champions Cup.

Year	Club	Starting round	Result
2022	Forge FC (Note: Although Forge was the regular season champion in 2021, they qualified to the Champions League due to their placement in the 2021 CONCACAF League, as the CPL Shield berth was only first awarded in 2023.)	Round of 16	Round of 16
2024	Cavalry FC	Round one	Round one
2025	Forge FC	Round one	Round one
2026	Forge FC	Round one	Round one
2027	Cavalry FC	Round one	TBD

== See also ==
- Maurice Podoloff Trophy, an NBA trophy having the same function as the CPL Shield.
- NWSL Shield, an NWSL trophy with the having function as the CPL Shield.
- Presidents' Trophy, an NHL trophy having the same function as the CPL Shield.
- Supporters' Shield, an MLS trophy having the same function as the CPL Shield.
- Wooden Spoon awards, an award given to a team with the worst regular season record.
