= 2025 Canadian Premier League season =

Professional soccer league season

Canadian Premier League
- Season: 2025
- Dates: April 5 – October 18 (regular season); October 22 – November 9 (playoffs)
- Champions: Atlético Ottawa (1st title)
- CPL Shield: Forge FC (3rd shield)
- CONCACAF Champions Cup: Atlético Ottawa; Forge FC; Vancouver FC
- Matches: 112
- Goals: 336 (3 per match)
- Top goalscorer: Samuel Salter (19 goals)
- Biggest home win: Forge FC 5–0 Valour FC (August 2)
- Biggest away win: Valour FC 0–5 Forge FC (June 22)
- Highest scoring: Cavalry FC 5–4 Vancouver FC (August 17)
- Longest winning run: 6 matches Forge FC (July 18 – August 22)
- Longest unbeaten run: 20 matches Forge FC (April 5 – August 22)
- Longest winless run: 11 matches Vancouver FC (May 17 – July 25)
- Longest losing run: 5 matches Valour FC (June 15 – July 20); Vancouver FC (August 10 – September 5)
- Highest attendance: 17,971; Forge FC 2–2 Atlético Ottawa (May 13)
- Lowest attendance: 1,178; Vancouver FC 2–2 Cavalry FC (October 18)
- Total attendance: 447,800
- Average attendance: 3,998

The 2025 Canadian Premier League season was the seventh season of the Canadian Premier League, the top men's professional level of the Canadian Soccer Association's league system.

== Rule changes ==
The CPL's total player compensation budget was increased by $69,500 to a total of $1,182,000 (or $1,282,000 for teams maximizing the U-21 salary incentive). Beginning in 2025, players who had three seasons of CPL experience or have lived in Canada for at least three years were considered domestic players for roster purposes.

== Teams ==
The same eight teams that competed in the 2024 season also competed in the 2025 season. This was the final season of play for Valour FC, who ceased operations.

=== Stadiums and locations ===
Location of the 2025 Canadian Premier League teams

Club	Results	Location	Stadium	Capacity
Atlético Ottawa	details	Ottawa, Ontario	TD Place Stadium	24,000
Cavalry FC	details	Foothills County, Alberta	ATCO Field	6,000
Forge FC	details	Hamilton, Ontario	Hamilton Stadium	23,218
HFX Wanderers FC	details	Halifax, Nova Scotia	Wanderers Grounds	7,500
Pacific FC	details	Langford, British Columbia	Starlight Stadium	6,000
Valour FC	details	Winnipeg, Manitoba	Princess Auto Stadium	32,343
Vancouver FC	details	Langley, British Columbia	Willoughby Community Park	6,560
York United FC	details	Toronto, Ontario	York Lions Stadium	4,000

=== Personnel and sponsorship ===
Team	Head coach	Captain	Kit manufacturer	Shirt sponsor
Atlético Ottawa	(Mexico) Diego Mejía	(Canada) Nathan Ingham	Macron	Maple Lodge Farms
Cavalry	(England) Tommy Wheeldon Jr.	(Canada) Marco Carducci	Macron	WestJet
Forge	(Canada) Bobby Smyrniotis	(Canada) Kyle Bekker	Macron	WeatherTech
HFX Wanderers	(Canada) Patrice Gheisar	(Trinidad and Tobago) Andre Rampersad	Macron	Volkswagen
Pacific	(Canada) James Merriman	(Wales) Josh Heard	Macron	Telus
Valour	(Canada) Phillip Dos Santos	(Ghana) Raphael Ohin	Macron	OneSoccer
Vancouver	(Canada) Martin Nash (interim)	(Canada) Callum Irving	Macron	Caffè Artigiano
York United	(Canada) Mauro Eustáquio	(England) Elijah Adekugbe	Macron	Carlsberg 0.0%

=== Coaching changes ===
Team	Outgoing coach	Manner of departure	Date of vacancy	Position in table	Incoming coach	Date of appointment
York United	(Mexico) Benjamín Mora	End of contract	November 10, 2024	Pre-season	(Canada) Mauro Eustáquio	November 21, 2024
Atlético Ottawa	(Spain) Carlos González	Mutual consent	November 21, 2024	Pre-season	(Mexico) Diego Mejía	January 15, 2025
Vancouver	(Iran) Afshin Ghotbi	Mutual consent	July 23, 2025	8th	(Canada) Martin Nash (interim)	July 24, 2025

== Regular season ==
=== Format ===
The regular season was played as a quadruple round-robin, with each team playing the other seven teams twice at home and twice away between April and October. The regular season winner Forge FC was awarded the CPL Shield and qualified for Round one of the 2026 CONCACAF Champions Cup.

The top five teams qualified for the playoffs.

=== Standings ===
Pos	Team	Pld	W	D	L	GF	GA	GD	Pts	Qualification
1	Forge (S)	28	16	10	2	51	22	+29	58	First semifinal and 2026 CONCACAF Champions Cup
2	Atlético Ottawa (C)	28	15	11	2	54	28	+26	56	First semifinal
3	Cavalry	28	11	9	8	47	36	+11	42	Quarterfinal
4	HFX Wanderers	28	11	6	11	41	34	+7	39	Play-in round
5	York United	28	10	8	10	43	38	+5	38	Play-in round
6	Valour	28	7	5	16	35	62	−27	26	
7	Pacific	28	5	8	15	30	59	−29	23	
8	Vancouver	28	4	9	15	35	57	−22	21	2026 CONCACAF Champions Cup (Note: Vancouver FC qualified for the Champions Cup as the runners-up of the 2025 Canadian Championship, due to the winners, Vancouver Whitecaps FC, qualifying through Major League Soccer.)

Source: CanPL
Rules for classification: 1) Points; 2) Total number of wins; 3) Head-to-head; 4) Goal differential; 5) Goals for; 6) Away goals differential; 7) Away goals for; 8) Home goals differential; 9) Home goals for; 10) Fewest disciplinary points; 11) Most under-21 domestic player minutes; 12) Drawing of lots.
(C) Champion (qualified to Champions Cup Round one); (S) CPL Shield winner (qualified to Champions Cup Round one)

=== Results ===
Home \ Away	ATO	CAV	FOR	HFX	PAC	VAL	VFC	YRK
Atlético Ottawa		2–2	1–1	2–2	3–1	5–2	3–1	3–2
Atlético Ottawa		3–0	1–1	2–0	2–0	3–0	0–0	0–0
Cavalry	1–3		4–1	0–0	4–0	4–0	1–1	2–1
Cavalry	0–2		1–1	3–1	1–0	3–0	5–4	0–1
Forge	2–2	1–0		2–1	2–0	1–1	2–1	2–2
Forge	2–0	1–1		1–0	4–0	5–0	1–1	3–0
HFX Wanderers	2–0	0–3	0–0		3–1	3–1	1–0	4–0
HFX Wanderers	0–1	1–1	1–2		3–0	4–1	1–2	1–1
Pacific	0–1	1–0	0–2	3–2		2–0	4–4	2–1
Pacific	0–2	3–3	0–1	2–2		1–4	1–1	1–3
Valour	1–2	1–2	0–5	0–1	0–0		1–3	2–1
Valour	3–3	2–1	2–1	0–3	1–1		3–1	0–0
Vancouver	1–4	0–0	0–2	0–2	1–1	1–3		0–2
Vancouver	2–2	2–2	0–1	3–1	2–3	2–5		2–1
York United	0–0	1–2	2–2	1–2	5–1	3–2	1–0	
York United	2–2	3–1	1–2	2–0	2–2	1–0	4–0	

Source: CanPL.ca
Legend: Blue = home team win; Yellow = draw; Red = away team win.

=== Positions by match week ===
Team ╲ Week	1	2	3	4	5	6	7	8	9	10	11	12	13	14	15	16	17	18	19	20	21	22	23	24	25	26	27	28
Atlético Ottawa	5	2	1	1	1	1	1	2	1	1	1	1	1	1	1	1	1	2	2	2	2	2	2	2	2	2	2	2
Cavalry	6	6	6	7	5	4	3	3	3	2	3	3	4	4	4	3	3	3	3	3	3	3	3	3	3	3	3	3
Forge	3	1	3	3	3	3	4	4	4	4	2	2	2	2	2	2	2	1	1	1	1	1	1	1	1	1	1	1
HFX Wanderers	4	3	2	2	2	2	2	1	2	3	4	4	3	3	3	4	5	5	5	5	5	4	5	4	5	5	4	5
Pacific	2	5	5	5	7	5	5	5	6	6	6	6	6	6	6	6	6	6	6	6	6	6	7	7	7	7	7	7
Valour	8	7	7	8	8	8	7	8	8	7	7	7	7	8	8	7	7	7	7	7	7	7	6	6	6	6	6	6
Vancouver	7	8	8	6	4	6	6	7	7	8	8	8	8	7	7	8	8	8	8	8	8	8	8	8	8	8	8	8
York United	1	4	4	4	6	7	8	6	5	5	5	5	5	5	5	5	4	4	4	4	4	5	4	5	4	4	5	4

Source: CanPL As It Stands articles, CanPL standings
= First semifinal; = Quarterfinal; = Play-in round

== Playoffs ==
The 2025 playoffs featured a series of single-leg matches for five teams following a modified Page playoff system; the top two regular season teams got byes to the first semifinal; the third-placed team got a bye to the quarterfinal; while the fourth- and fifth-placed teams contested a play-in match to reach the quarterfinal.

The winner of the quarterfinal and the loser of the first semifinal contested the second semifinal. The winner of the first semifinal hosted the winner of the second semifinal in the 2025 CPL Final to crown the league champion, who collected the North Star Cup, and qualified for the 2026 CONCACAF Champions Cup.

In playoffs, if the scores were equal at the end of normal time, two 15 minute periods of extra time were played, with each team allowed an extra substitution. If still tied, the winner was decided by a penalty shoot-out.

If a team completed the 'Double', that is, the regular season winner also won the 2025 CPL Final, then the second-highest seeded regular season team would have qualified for the 2026 CONCACAF Champions Cup.

=== Bracket ===
Play-in round
October 22 – Halifax
4	HFX Wanderers	2 (4)
5	York United (p)	2 (5)

First semifinal
October 26 – Hamilton
1	Forge	1
2	Atlético Ottawa	2
Quarterfinal
October 26 – Foothills County
3	Cavalry	4
5	York United	1

Second semifinal
November 2 – Hamilton
1	Forge	0
3	Cavalry	1

Final
November 9 – Ottawa
2	Atlético Ottawa (a.e.t.)	2
3	Cavalry	1

=== Play-in round ===
October 22
7:30 pm ADT (Note: In the 109th minute, the match was suspended for four minutes due to lightning in the area. The match was suspended for another 31 minutes in the 112th minute for the same reason.)

HFX Wanderers	2–2 (a.e.t.)	York United
Coimbra 45+1'; Gagnon-Laparé 114'	Report	Altobelli 86'; Hundal 119'
Penalties
Coimbra (penalty scored); Callegari (penalty missed); Timoteo (penalty scored); Johnston (penalty scored); Baï (penalty scored); Gagnon-Laparé (penalty missed)	4–5	(penalty scored) Altobelli; (penalty scored) Bitar; (penalty scored) Hundal; (penalty missed) Yeates; (penalty scored) Ferrin; (penalty scored) Kibato

Wanderers Grounds, Halifax, Nova Scotia
Attendance: 5,444
Referee: Sebastian Noshinravani

=== Quarterfinal ===
October 26
4:00 pm MDT

Cavalry	4–1	York United
Musse 8'; Warschewski 17', 58'; Singh 47' (o.g.)	Report	Hundal 44'

ATCO Field, Foothills County, Alberta
Attendance: 3,729
Referee: Ben Hoskins

=== First semifinal ===
October 26
2:00 pm EDT

Forge	1–2	Atlético Ottawa
Choinière 23'	Report	Antinoro 33'; Salter 58'

Hamilton Stadium, Hamilton, Ontario
Attendance: 6,463
Referee: Carly Shaw-MacLaren

=== Second semifinal ===
November 2
4:00 pm EST

Forge	0–1	Cavalry
	Report	Warschewski 57'

Hamilton Stadium, Hamilton, Ontario
Attendance: 6,125
Referee: Yusri Rudolf

=== Final ===
November 9
5:20 pm EST (Note: The match, originally scheduled for 5:00 pm, was delayed 20 minutes due to the need for snow removal.)

Atlético Ottawa	2–1 (a.e.t.)	Cavalry
Rodríguez 40', 107'	Report	Aird 33' (pen.)

TD Place Stadium, Ottawa, Ontario
Attendance: 13,132
Referee: Michael Venne

== Statistical leaders ==
=== Top scorers ===
Rank	Player	Club	Goals
1	(Canada) Samuel Salter	Atlético Ottawa	20
2	(Canada) Tiago Coimbra	HFX Wanderers	13
3	(Canada) Brian Wright	Forge	12
4	(Canada) Julian Altobelli	York United	11
4	(Canada) Ballou Tabla	Atlético Ottawa	11
4	(Germany) Tobias Warschewski	Cavalry	11
7	(Somalia) Ali Musse	Cavalry	10
8	(Canada) Shaan Hundal	Valour / York United	9
8	(United States) David Rodríguez	Atlético Ottawa	9
10	(Canada) Sergio Camargo	Cavalry	8

=== Hat-tricks ===
Player	For	Against	Result	Date	Ref.
(Canada) Samuel Salter^{4}	Atlético Ottawa	Valour	5–2 (H)	May 10	
(Canada) Brian Wright	Forge	Valour	5–0 (A)	June 22	
(Ivory Coast) Yann Toualy	Pacific	HFX Wanderers	3–2 (H)	July 12	
(Canada) Tiago Coimbra	HFX Wanderers	Valour	4–1 (H)	August 22	
(Canada) Shaan Hundal^{4}	York United	Pacific	5–1 (H)	August 24	
(Canada) Myles Morgan	Valour	Vancouver	5–2 (A)	September 5	

Note: ^{4} – player scored 4 goals

=== Top assists ===
Rank	Player	Club	Assists
1	(United States) David Rodríguez	Atlético Ottawa	9
2	(Somalia) Ali Musse	Cavalry	7
3	(Canada) Themi Antonoglou	Valour	6
3	(Canada) Manny Aparicio	Atlético Ottawa	6
3	(Canada) Thierno Bah	Vancouver	6
3	(Canada) Sergio Camargo	Cavalry	6
7	(Canada) Max Ferrari	York United	5
7	(Canada) Hoce Massunda	Forge	5
7	(Canada) Sean Rea	Halifax Wanderers	5
7	(Canada) Wesley Timóteo	Halifax Wanderers	5
7	(Germany) Tobias Warschewski	Cavalry	5

=== Clean sheets ===
Rank	Player	Club	Clean sheets
1	(Czech Republic) Jassem Koleilat	Forge	13
2	(Canada) Nathan Ingham	Atlético Ottawa	11
3	(Algeria) Rayane Yesli	HFX Wanderers	8
3	(Canada) Marco Carducci	Cavalry	8
5	(Mexico) Diego Urtiaga	York United	7

== Attendance ==
Pos	Team	Total	High	Low	Average	Change
1	Forge FC	97,054	17,971	4,371	6,932	+31.3%
2	HFX Wanderers	90,420	7,143	5,044	6,459	+6.6%
3	Atlético Ottawa	65,899	6,087	3,337	4,706	−14.2%
4	Cavalry FC	59,781	5,114	3,669	4,270	+1.1%
5	Valour FC	44,977	11,390	1,591	3,213	+3.4%
6	Pacific FC	41,459	4,300	2,281	2,961	−2.6%
7	York United	28,768	7,218	1,342	2,055	+37.1%
8	Vancouver FC	19,442	2,006	1,178	1,389	−56.1%
	League total	447,800	17,971	1,178	3,998	+0.4%

Source: CanPL, FotMob

== Awards ==
=== Canadian Premier League Awards ===
The 2025 Canadian Premier League Awards was held in Gatineau, Quebec, on November 7, 2025.

Award	Recipient	Finalists	Ref.
Golden Boot	(Canada) Samuel Salter (Atlético Ottawa)	N/A	
Golden Glove	(Czech Republic) Jassem Koleilat (Forge FC)	(Canada) Marco Carducci (Cavalry FC) (Canada) Nathan Ingham (Atlético Ottawa) (Czech Republic) Jassem Koleilat (Forge FC)	
Coach of the Year	(Canada) Bobby Smyrniotis (Forge FC)	(Canada) Mauro Eustáquio (York United FC) (Mexico) Diego Mejía (Atlético Ottawa) (Canada) Bobby Smyrniotis (Forge FC)	
Player of the Year	(Canada) Samuel Salter (Atlético Ottawa)	–	
Best Under 21 Canadian Player of the Year	(Canada) Tiago Coimbra (Halifax Wanderers FC)	(Canada) Noah Abatneh (Atlético Ottawa) (Brazil) Gabriel Antinoro (Atlético Ottawa) (Canada) Thierno Bah (Vancouver FC) (Canada) Tiago Coimbra (Halifax Wanderers FC) (Canada) Hoce Massunda (Forge FC)	
Defender of the Year	(Canada) Daniel Nimick (Forge FC)	(Canada) Noah Abatneh (Atlético Ottawa) (Canada) Daniel Nimick (Forge FC) (Albania) Rezart Rama (Forge FC)	
Players' Player of the Year	(Canada) Samuel Salter (Atlético Ottawa)	(Canada) Julian Altobelli (York United FC) (Ghana) Nana Ampomah (Forge FC) (Canada) Manuel Aparicio (Alético Ottawa) (Canada) Kyle Bekker (Forge FC) (Canada) Tiago Coimbra (Halifax Wanderers FC) (Somalia) Ali Musse (Cavalry FC) (Canada) Daniel Nimick (Forge FC) (United States) David Rodríguez (Atlético Ottawa) (Canada) Samuel Salter (Atlético Ottawa) (Canada) Ballou Tabla (Atlético Ottawa)	

=== Monthly awards ===
Month	Manager of the Month		Player of the Month		Goalkeeper of the Month		References
Month	Manager	Club	Player	Club	Goalkeeper	Club	References
April	(Canada) Patrice Gheisar	Halifax Wanderers FC	(United States) David Rodríguez	Atlético Ottawa	(Algeria) Rayane Yesli	Halifax Wanderers FC	
May	(England) Tommy Wheeldon Jr.	Cavalry FC	(Canada) Samuel Salter	Atlético Ottawa	(Canada) Marco Carducci	Cavalry FC	
June	(Mexico) Diego Mejía	Atlético Ottawa	(Canada) Daniel Nimick	Forge FC	(Canada) Nathan Ingham	Atlético Ottawa	
July	(Canada) Mauro Eustáquio	York United FC	(Canada) Kyle Bekker	Forge FC	(Czech Republic) Jassem Koleilat	Forge FC	
August	(Canada) Bobby Smyrniotis	Forge FC	(Somalia) Ali Musse	Cavalry FC	(Canada) Nathan Ingham	Atlético Ottawa	
September	(Mexico) Diego Mejía	Atlético Ottawa	(Canada) Ballou Tabla	Atlético Ottawa	(Canada) Nathan Ingham	Atlético Ottawa	
October	(England) Tommy Wheeldon Jr.	Cavalry FC	(Canada) Manuel Aparicio	Atlético Ottawa	(Canada) Callum Irving	Vancouver FC	

=== Team of the Week ===
The Gatorade Team of the Week were selected by the CPL's Kristian Jack and OneSoccer's Oliver Platt.

Team of the Week
Week	Goalkeeper	Defenders	Midfielders	Forwards	Ref
1	(Czech Republic) Koleilat (Forge)	(Serbia) Jevremović (Forge); (Colombia) Quintana (Pacific); (Canada) Nimick (Forge); (Canada) Chung (Pacific)	(Canada) Rea (HFX); (United States) Rodríguez (Ottawa); (England) Adekugbe (York); (Canada) Kratt (Pacific)	(Syria) Babouli (Forge); (Canada) Altobelli (York)	
2	(Canada) Ingham (Ottawa)	(Canada) Sow (HFX); (Sweden) Achinioti-Jönsson (Forge); (Canada) Kane (Forge)	(Portugal) Dos Santos (Ottawa); (Canada) Bekker (Forge); (Canada) Aparicio (Ottawa); (Ghana) Ampomah (Forge)	(United States) Rodríguez (Ottawa); (Canada) Coimbra (HFX); (Italy) Probo (HFX)	
3	(Canada) Carducci (Cavalry)	(Canada) Timoteo (HFX); (Uganda) Enyou (Vancouver); (Canada) Abatneh (Ottawa); (Canada) Fernandez (Valour)	(Canada) Aparicio (Ottawa); (Uruguay) Mezquida (Vancouver); (Canada) Fotsing (Vancouver)	(Canada) Rea (HFX); (Germany) Warschewski (Cavalry); (Italy) Probo (HFX)	
4	(Canada) Ingham (Ottawa)	(France) Ndom (Pacific); (Canada) Meilleur-Giguère (HFX); (Canada) Pearlman (HFX)	(Canada) Ferrazzo (York); (Canada) Hojabrpour (Forge); (Mexico) Castro (Ottawa); (Canada) Ferrari (York)	(Canada) Tabla (Ottawa); (Canada) Altobelli (York); (Brazil) Dias (HFX)	
5	(Canada) Ingham (Ottawa)	(Portugal) Dos Santos (Ottawa); (Canada) Meilleur-Giguère (HFX); (United States) O'Connor (Vancouver); (Canada) Aird (Cavalry)	(Canada) Camargo (Cavalry); (Bangladesh) Shome (Cavalry); (Canada) Bekker (Forge)	(Canada) Salter (Ottawa); (Mexico) Díaz (Vancouver); (Germany) Warschewski (Cavalry)	
6	(Canada) Ingham (Ottawa)	(Canada) Lajeunesse (Pacific); (France) Ndom (Pacific); (England) Laing (Cavalry); (Brazil) Antinoro (Ottawa)	(United States) Rodríguez (Ottawa); (Somalia) Musse (Cavalry); (Canada) Bustos (Pacific); (Bangladesh) Shome (Cavalry)	(Canada) Salter (Ottawa); (Germany) Warschewski (Cavalry)	
7	(Algeria) Yesli (HFX)	(Canada) Timoteo (HFX); (Canada) Montgomery (Cavalry); (Canada) Egwu (Valour); (Canada) Aird (Cavalry)	(Ghana) Ampomah (Forge); (Somalia) Musse (Cavalry); (Canada) Twardek (Valour); (Canada) Aparicio (Ottawa); (France) Callegari (HFX)	(Germany) Warschewski (Cavalry)	
8	(Canada) Carducci (Cavalry)	(Canada) Timoteo (HFX); (Canada) Meilleur-Giguère (HFX); (Canada) Nimick (Forge); (Canada) Pearlman (HFX)	(Canada) Camargo (Cavalry); (Somalia) Musse (Cavalry); (Canada) Johnston (HFX); (France) Callegari (HFX)	(Germany) Warschewski (Cavalry); (Canada) Altobelli (York)	
9	(Canada) Carducci (Cavalry)	(Mexico) Botello (York); (England) Owolabi-Belewu (Forge); (Canada) Adekugbe (York); (Portugal) Dos Santos (Ottawa)	(Canada) Kibato (York); (Trinidad and Tobago) Yeates (York); (Canada) Fotsing (Vancouver); (Ghana) Ampomah (Forge)	(Canada) Salter (Ottawa); (Canada) Altobelli (York)	
10	(Canada) Ingham (Ottawa)	(Canada) Montgomery (Cavalry); (Canada) Nimick (Forge); (Canada) Cloutier (Ottawa)	(Portugal) Dos Santos (Ottawa); (Portugal) Figueiredo (Valour); (Canada) Camargo (Cavalry); (Canada) Twardek (Valour)	(New Zealand) Herdman (Cavalry); (Canada) Wright (Forge); (Canada) Massunda (Forge)	
11	(Canada) Ingham (Ottawa)	(Mexico) Botello (York); (Canada) Nimick (Forge); (Canada) Pearlman (Halifax); (Brazil) Antinoro (Ottawa)	(Canada) Kibato (York); (Canada) Aparicio (Ottawa); (Canada) Bekker (Forge); (Canada) Accettola (York)	(United States) Rodríguez (Ottawa); (Canada) Coimbra (Halifax)	
12	(Canada) Pavela (York)	(Moldova) Gherasimencov (Cavalry); (Canada) Nimick (Forge); (Canada) Meilleur-Giguère (Halifax); (Canada) Pearlman (Halifax)	(Ghana) Ampomah (Forge); (Canada) Camargo (Cavalry); (Somalia) Musse (Cavalry); (Canada) Kibato (York); (Canada) Hojabrpour (Forge)	(Canada) Wright (Forge)	
13	(Canada) Ingham (Ottawa)	(Portugal) Dos Santos (Ottawa); (France) Ndom (Pacific); (Canada) Duhaney-Walker (Ottawa); (Albania) Rama (Forge)	(Canada) Rea (Halifax); (Peru) Fry (Vancouver); (Canada) Aparicio (Ottawa); (Canada) Reid (York)	(Canada) Coimbra (Halifax); (Canada) Wright (Forge)	
14	(Czech Republic) Koleilat (Forge)	(Mexico) Botello (York); (France) Ndom (Pacific); (Canada) Cloutier (Ottawa); (Canada) Kunle Dada-Luke (Vancouver)	(Republic of Ireland) Toualy (Pacific); (Canada) Bustos (Pacific); (Canada) Reid (York); (Canada) Kibato (York); (Canada) Bekker (Forge)	(Canada) Coimbra (Halifax)	
15	(Canada) Ingham (Ottawa)	(Canada) Ferrari (York); (Canada) Nimick (Forge); (Canada) Sturing (York); (Canada) Aird (Cavalry)	(Ghana) Ampomah (Forge); | (Lebanon) Bitar (York)|: (United States) Rodríguez (Ottawa); (Mexico) Castro (Ottawa); (Canada) Bekker (Forge)	(Canada) Salter (Ottawa)	
16	(Mexico) Urtiaga (York)	(Mexico) Botello (York); (Canada) Cloutier (Ottawa); (Canada) Sturing (York); (Canada) Fernandez (Valour)	(Canada) Froese (Valour); (United States) Rodríguez (Ottawa); (Canada) Paton (Forge); (France) Callegari (HFX); (Canada) Bekker (Forge)	(Canada) Salter (Ottawa)	
17	(Canada) Irving (Vancouver)	(Mexico) Botello (York); (United States) O'Connor (Vancouver); (Canada) Sturing (York); (Albania) Rama (Forge)	(Peru) Fry (Vancouver); (Canada) Young (Pacific); (Canada) Bekker (Forge); (Canada) Chung (Pacific)	(Syria) Babouli (Forge); (Ghana) Ampomah (Forge)	
18	(Canada) Carducci (Cavalry)	(Canada) Kozlovskiy (Ottawa); (Canada) Sow (HFX); (Canada) Chung (Pacific)	(Canada) Zanatta (Pacific); (Canada) Hojabrpour (Forge); (Canada) Aparicio (Ottawa); (Canada) Borges (Forge)	(Canada) Salter (Ottawa); (Mexico) Díaz (Vancouver); (United States) Rodríguez (Ottawa)	
19	(Canada) Ingham (Ottawa)	(Serbia) Jevremović (Forge); (Netherlands) Klomp (Cavalry); (Canada) Sturing (York); (Canada) Pearlman (Halifax)	(Canada) Bekker (Forge); (Canada) Hojabrpour (Forge); (Canada) Daniels (Pacific)	(Uruguay) Mezquida (Vancouver); (Canada) Wright (Forge); (Somalia) Musse (Cavalry)	
20	(Canada) Ingham (Ottawa)	(Mexico) Botello (York); (Sweden) Achinioti-Jönsson (Forge); (Albania) Rama (Forge)	(Canada) Ferrin (York); (Canada) Aparicio (Ottawa); (Mexico) López (York); (Canada) Johnston (HFX); (Somalia) Musse (Cavalry)	(Canada) Coimbra (Halifax); (Canada) Hundal (York)	
21	(Algeria) Yesli (HFX)	(Netherlands) Konincks (Valour); (Canada) Meilleur-Giguère (Halifax); (Netherlands) Klomp (Cavalry)	(Canada) Ntignee (Cavalry); (Canada) Aparicio (Ottawa); (Canada) Camargo (Cavalry); (Canada) Pearlman (Halifax)	(Republic of the Congo) Bahamboula (HFX); (Germany) Warschewski (Cavalry); (United States) Rodríguez (Ottawa)	
22	(Canada) Melvin (Pacific)	(Mexico) Botello (York); (Canada) Sturing (York); (Spain) Mbomio (Ottawa); (Canada) Ferrari (York)	(Canada) Tabla (Ottawa); (Canada) Aparicio (Ottawa); (Canada) Froese (Valour); (United States) Rodríguez (Ottawa)	(Canada) Morgan (Valour); (Ghana) Ampomah (Forge)	
23	(Canada) Irving (Vancouver)	(Canada) Antonoglou (Valour); (France) Ndom (Pacific); (Canada) Facchineri (Valour); (Canada) Ferrari (York)	(Canada) Ntignee (Cavalry); (Somalia) Musse (Cavalry); (Canada) Froese (Valour); (Canada) Aparicio (Ottawa); (Canada) Kobza (Cavalry)	(Canada) Salter (Ottawa)	
24	(Canada) Carducci (Cavalry)	(Canada) Bah (Vancouver); (Canada) Campagna (Vancouver); (Canada) Alphonse (HFX); (Brazil) Antinoro (Ottawa)	(Canada) Ntignee (Cavalry); (Canada) Johnston (HFX); (Canada) Kobza (Cavalry); (Canada) Massunda (Forge)	(Canada) Tabla (Ottawa); (Canada) Rea (Halifax)	
25	(Canada) Ingham (Ottawa)	(Serbia) Jevremović (Forge); (Canada) Nimick (Forge); (Canada) Sturing (York); (Canada) Kunle Dada-Luke (Vancouver)	(Canada) Tabla (Ottawa); (Peru) Fry (Vancouver); (Canada) Jensen (Forge); (Canada) Massunda (Forge)	(Canada) Salter (Ottawa); (Canada) Mbongue (Vancouver)	
26	(Canada) Irving (Vancouver)	(Canada) Antonoglou (Valour); (Algeria) Mekidèche (HFX); (Canada) Campagna (Vancouver)	(Canada) Kibato (York); (Canada) Fotsing (Vancouver); (Canada) Aparicio (Ottawa); (Canada) Ferrin (York)	(Canada) Ntignee (Cavalry); (Mexico) Díaz (Pacific); (Canada) Tabla (Ottawa)	
27	(Canada) Irving (Vancouver)	(Canada) Levis (Ottawa); (Uganda) Enyou (Vancouver); (Sweden) Achinioti-Jönsson (Forge)	(Canada) Sow (HFX); (Canada) Kibato (York); (Canada) Johnston (HFX); (Canada) Pearlman (Halifax)	(Canada) Camargo (Cavalry); (Mexico) Díaz (Pacific); (Canada) Bustos (Pacific)	
28	(Canada) Ingham (Ottawa)	(Canada) Antonoglou (Valour); (Sweden) Achinioti-Jönsson (Forge); (Netherlands) Konincks (Valour)	(Ukraine) Voytsekhovskyy (Valour); (Canada) Borges (Forge); (Canada) Aparicio (Ottawa); (Canada) Choinière (Forge)	(Canada) Morgan (Valour); (Canada) Wright (Forge); (Saint Lucia) Elva (Cavalry)	

== Player transfers ==
There were two transfer windows, the first open from January 31 to April 23 and the second from July 24 to August 21.

=== CPL–U Sports Draft ===
The 2025 CPL–U Sports Draft took place on December 5, 2024.

=== Foreign players ===
Canadian Premier League teams can sign a maximum of seven international players, out of which only five can be in the starting line-up for each match.

The following international players were signed for the 2025 season. To be considered domestic for CPL purposes, players must be Canadian citizens, permanent residents, refugees, or (new for 2025) foreign players with at least three seasons spent in the league. Note that these players may still represent other countries in international competitions.

Club	Player 1	Player 2	Player 3	Player 4	Player 5	Player 6	Player 7	Inactive players (Note: Players who remain under contract but have suffered season-ending injury and may not return to play. They do not count towards roster or cap restrictions and as such can be replaced by another foreign player.)	Former players
Atlético Ottawa	(Spain) Alberto Zapater	(Mexico) Juan Castro	(United States) David Rodríguez	(New Zealand) **Monty Patterson**	(Mexico) Kevin Ortega	(Mexico) Antonio Álvarez	(Spain) Roni Mbomio		(Mexico) Iker Moreno
Cavalry	(Germany) Nicolas Wähling	(England) Levi Laing	(Netherlands) Ayman Sellouf						(Australia) Jesse Daley
Forge	(Belgium) Béni Badibanga	(Ghana) **Nana Opoku Ampomah**	(Albania) Rezart Rama	(Serbia) **Marko Jevremović**	(Greece) Christos Liatifis	(Belgium) Victor Klonaridis			
HFX Wanderers	(France) Lorenzo Callegari	(Brazil) Vitor Dias	(France) Yohan Baï	(Republic of the Congo) **Jason Bahamboula**					(Italy) Giorgio Probo
Pacific	(France) Aly Ndom	(Brazil) Daniel de Pauli	(Sweden) Lukas Browning Lagerfeldt	(Mexico) Emanuel Montejano				(Colombia) Juan Quintana	(Portugal) Pedro Machado
Valour	(England) Kian Williams	(Portugal) Diogo Ressurreição	(Portugal) Xavier Venâncio	(Portugal) Bruno Figueiredo	(Netherlands) Diego Konincks	(New Zealand) **Oskar van Hattum**			
Vancouver	(Mexico) José Navarro	(Uganda) Allan Enyou	(Brazil) Juan Batista	(Brazil) Michel Cavalcante	(France) Abdoulaye Ouattara	(Senegal) Pathé Ndiaye	(Uruguay) Nicolás Mezquida		
York United	(Mexico) Oswaldo León	(Mexico) Orlando Botello	(Mexico) Diego Urtiaga	(Mexico) Leonel López					(Portugal) Bryan Rosa

Players in italic denote players who were new to their respective clubs for the 2025 season, sorted chronologically by their announcement. Players in bold indicate players who have represented their national teams at the senior level.
