= 2025 HFX Wanderers FC season =

Halifax Wanderers
2025 season
- President: Derek Martin
- Head coach: Patrice Gheisar
- Stadium: Wanderers Grounds
- Canadian Premier League: 4th
- CPL playoffs: Play-in round
- Canadian Championship: Preliminary round
- Top goalscorer: League: Tiago Coimbra (12); All: Tiago Coimbra (13)
- Highest home attendance: 7,143
- Lowest home attendance: 5,044
- Average home league attendance: 6,421
Home colours	Away colours

The 2025 HFX Wanderers FC season was the seventh season in the history of HFX Wanderers FC. In addition to the Canadian Premier League, the club competed in the Canadian Championship. On April 2, 2025, the announcement was made that the Wanderers would compete in the CPL's first regular season game ever played in Quebec, as part of the "CPL on Tour" series.

In addition to changes to the player roster, other offseason changes included the hiring of Mark Watson as Senior Football Strategy Advisor, Peter Clark as Vice-President of Business Development, and Nicholas Edwards as Head of Performance. The Wanderers Grounds stadium was also renovated to expand its capacity and improve the spectator experience.

== Squad ==
As of September 5, 2025

No.	Player	Nationality	Position(s)	Date of birth (age)	Previous club	Notes
Goalkeepers
13	Aiden Rushenas	(Canada)	GK	May 23, 2003 (aged 22)	(Canada) Dalhousie Tigers	
99	Rayane Yesli	(Algeria)	GK	October 12, 1999 (aged 26)	(Canada) Atlético Ottawa	
Defenders
4	Julian Dunn	(Canada)	CB	July 11, 2000 (aged 25)	(Finland) HamKam	
5	Adam Pearlman	(Canada)	CB	April 5, 2005 (aged 20)	(Canada) Toronto FC	U21, Loan
16	Kareem Sow	(Canada)	CB	September 28, 2000 (aged 25)	(Canada) Montreal Carabins	
17	Wesley Timoteo	(Canada)	FB / RW / LW	April 9, 2000 (aged 25)	(Canada) FC Edmonton	
21	Jefferson Alphonse	(Canada)	CB	June 12, 2003 (aged 22)	(Canada) CS Saint-Laurent	
26	Thomas Meilleur-Giguère	(Canada)	CB	November 13, 1997 (aged 28)	(Canada) Pacific FC	
44	Nassim Mekideche	(Algeria)	CB	April 30, 2000 (aged 25)	(Tunisia) US Monastir	
Midfielders
6	Lorenzo Callegari	(France)	CM	February 27, 1998 (aged 27)	(France) Chambly	INT
7	Ryan Telfer	(Trinidad and Tobago)	LW	March 4, 1994 (aged 31)	(United States) Miami FC	
8	Isaiah Johnston	(Canada)	CM	August 14, 2001 (aged 24)	(United States) Loudoun United	
11	Vitor Dias	(Brazil)	AM	April 30, 1998 (aged 27)	(United States) Sporting Kansas City II	INT
18	Andre Rampersad	(Trinidad and Tobago)	CM	February 2, 1995 (aged 30)	(Trinidad and Tobago) Santa Rosa	
19	Yohan Baï	(France)	RM / RW	September 28, 1996 (aged 29)	(Bulgaria) Lokomotiv Plovdiv	INT
23	Alessandro Biello	(Canada)	CM	July 20, 2005 (aged 20)	(Canada) CF Montréal	U21, Loan
28	Jérémy Gagnon-Laparé	(Canada)	CM	March 9, 1995 (aged 30)	(Canada) York United	
41	Camilo Vasconcelos	(Canada)	AM	March 19, 2005 (aged 20)	(Canada) Guelph United	U21
Forwards
9	Tiago Coimbra	(Canada)	CF	January 17, 2004 (aged 21)	(Brazil) Palmeiras	U21
10	Sean Rea	(Canada)	CF / CM	May 15, 2002 (aged 23)	(Spain) Castellón B	
14	Jason Bahamboula	(Republic of the Congo)	RW / CF	June 15, 2001 (aged 24)	(Latvia) Valmiera FC	INT
20	Tavio Ciccarelli	(Canada)	CF	July 24, 2006 (aged 19)	(England) Sheffield United Academy	U21, EYT
	Reshaun Walkes	(Canada)	CF	November 7, 1999 (aged 26)	(Canada) Simcoe County Rovers	

== Transfers ==
=== In ===
No.	Pos.	Player	From club	Fee/notes	Date	Source
	DF	(Canada) Thomas Meilleur-Giguère	(Canada) Pacific FC	Free	January 1, 2025	
	GK	(Algeria) Rayane Yesli	(Canada) Atlético Ottawa	Free	January 8, 2025	
	MF	(Canada) Isaiah Johnston	(United States) Loudoun United	Undisclosed fee	January 15, 2025	
	MF	(France) Yohan Baï	(Bulgaria) Lokomotiv Plovdiv	Free	January 27, 2025	
	FW	(Republic of the Congo) Jason Bahamboula	(Latvia) Valmiera FC	Free	January 29, 2025	
	MF	(Canada) Joven Mann	(Canada) UBC Thunderbirds	Selected 11th in the 2025 CPL–U Sports Draft, U-Sports contract	March 21, 2025	
	GK	(Canada) Sinclair Astridge	(Canada) Dalhousie Tigers	U-Sports contract	March 26, 2025	
	FW	(Canada) Reshaun Walkes	(Canada) Simcoe County Rovers	Free	September 5, 2025	

==== Loans in ====
No.	Pos.	Player	From club	Fee/notes	Date	Source
	MF	(Canada) Alessandro Biello	(Canada) CF Montréal	Season-long loan	February 18, 2025	
	DF	(Canada) Adam Pearlman	(Canada) Toronto FC	Season-long loan	February 24, 2025	

==== Draft picks ====
HFX Wanderers selected the following players in the 2025 CPL–U Sports Draft. Draft picks are not automatically signed to the team roster. Only those who are signed to a contract will be listed as transfers in.

Round	Selection	Pos.	Player	Nationality	University
1	3	DF	Matthew Paiva	Canada	McMaster
2	11	MF	Joven Mann	Canada	UBC

=== Out ===
No.	Pos.	Player	To club	Fee/notes	Date	Source
1	GK	(Canada) Yann-Alexandre Fillion	(Malta) Floriana	Contract expired	December 31, 2024	
2	DF	(Canada) Daniel Nimick	(Canada) Forge FC	Contract expired	December 31, 2024	
3	DF	(Canada) Zachary Fernandez	(Canada) Valour FC	Contract expired	December 31, 2024	
14	MF	(Canada) Clément Bayiha	(Canada) York United	Loan expired	December 31, 2024	
5	DF	(Canada) Cale Loughrey	(Romania) Corvinul Hunedoara	Option declined	December 31, 2024	
23	DF	(Canada) Riley Ferrazzo	(Canada) York United	Option declined	December 31, 2024	
10	MF	(Canada) Aidan Daniels	(Canada) Pacific FC	Option declined	December 31, 2024	
24	MF	(Canada) Tomas Giraldo		Option declined	December 31, 2024	
8	FW	(Canada) Massimo Ferrin	(Canada) York United	Undisclosed fee	February 3, 2025	
27	MF	(Italy) Giorgio Probo		Contract terminated by mutual consent	August 15, 2025	

== Pre-season and friendlies ==
Win Draw Loss Fixtures

6 August 2025 Friendly	Portland Hearts of Pine (United States)	2-1	(Canada) Halifax Wanderers FC	Portland, Maine
19:30 ADT	Lopez 18'; Kvite (yellow card) 21'; S. Wright (yellow card) 45+1'; O. Wright 90+2'; Oladapo (yellow card) 90+4'	Report	Gagnon-Laparé (yellow card) 26' (yellow-red card) 78'; Alphonse (yellow card) 38'; Ciccarelli 57'; Rushenas (yellow card) 88' (red card) 90+2'	Stadium: Fitzpatrick Stadium; Attendance: 5,645

== Competitions ==
Matches are listed in Halifax local time: Atlantic Daylight Time (UTC−03:00)

=== Overview ===
Competition	First match	Last match	Starting round	Final position	Record							
Competition	First match	Last match	Starting round	Final position	Pld	W	D	L	GF	GA	GD	Win %
Canadian Premier League	April 4	October 18	Matchday 1		6	3	2	1	8	7	+1	50.00
Canadian Championship	May 7	May 7	First round	eliminated	1	0	0	1	1	3	−2	0.00
Total					7	3	2	2	9	10	−1	42.86

Last updated: May 12
Source: Competitions

=== Canadian Premier League ===
==== Table ====
Pos	Team	Pld	W	D	L	GF	GA	GD	Pts	Qualification
1	Forge (S)	28	16	10	2	51	22	+29	58	First semifinal and 2026 CONCACAF Champions Cup
2	Atlético Ottawa (C)	28	15	11	2	54	28	+26	56	First semifinal
3	Cavalry	28	11	9	8	47	36	+11	42	Quarterfinal
4	HFX Wanderers	28	11	6	11	41	34	+7	39	Play-in round
5	York United	28	10	8	10	43	38	+5	38	Play-in round
6	Valour	28	7	5	16	35	62	−27	26	
7	Pacific	28	5	8	15	30	59	−29	23	
8	Vancouver	28	4	9	15	35	57	−22	21	2026 CONCACAF Champions Cup (Note: Vancouver FC qualified for the Champions Cup as the runners-up of the 2025 Canadian Championship, due to the winners, Vancouver Whitecaps FC, qualifying through Major League Soccer.)

Source: CanPL
Rules for classification: 1) Points; 2) Total number of wins; 3) Head-to-head; 4) Goal differential; 5) Goals for; 6) Away goals differential; 7) Away goals for; 8) Home goals differential; 9) Home goals for; 10) Fewest disciplinary points; 11) Most under-21 domestic player minutes; 12) Drawing of lots.
(C) Champion (qualified to Champions Cup Round one); (S) CPL Shield winner (qualified to Champions Cup Round one)

==== Results by match ====
Match	1	2	3	4	5	6	7	8	9	10	11	12	13	14	15	16	17	18	19	20	21	22	23	24	25	26	27	28
Result	D	W	W	W	D	L	W	W	L	L	D	W	W	L	L	L	L	D	D	W	W	L	L	W	L	D	W	L
Position	4	3	2	2	2	2	2	1	2	3	4	4	2	3	4	5	5	4	5	5	4	4	5	4	5	5	4	4

Updated to match(es) played on October 23. Source: #Matches
W = Win; D = Draw; L = Loss

3

==== Matches ====
5 April 2025 1	Atlético Ottawa	2–2	Halifax Wanderers FC	Ottawa, Ontario
15:00 ADT	Walker (yellow card) 4'; Rodríguez 60'; Sissoko 79'; Mejía (yellow card) 81'; Walker (red card) 86'	Report	Probo 20'; Rea 47'; Callegari (yellow card) 90+7'	Stadium: TD Place; Attendance: 5,286; Referee: Mathieu Souaré

13 April 2025 2	York United FC	1–2	Halifax Wanderers FC	Toronto, Ontario
16:00 ADT	Bitar 22'; Bitar (yellow card) 71'; Higgins (yellow card) 78'; Ferrari (yellow card) 86'; Adekugbe (yellow card) 86'	Report	Callegari (yellow card) 42'; Johnston (yellow card) 43'; Probo 53', (yellow card) 71'; Coimbra 81', (yellow card) 82'; Mekidèche (yellow card) 86'; Yesli (yellow card) 90+4'	Stadium: York Lions Stadium; Attendance: 2,087; Referee: Renzo Villanueva

19 April 2025 3	Halifax Wanderers FC	3–1	Pacific FC	Halifax, Nova Scotia
16:30 ADT	Timoteo 19'; Probo (yellow card) 45+5'; Pearlman (yellow card) 45+5'; Telfer 65'; Yesli (yellow card) 79'; Baï (yellow card) 84'; Baï 90+5'	Report	Chung (yellow card) 27'; Quintana (yellow card) 43'; Machado (yellow card) 45+2'; Zanatta 71'	Stadium: Wanderers Grounds; Attendance: 6,817; Referee: Michael Venne

25 April 2025 4	Valour FC	0–1	Halifax Wanderers FC	Winnipeg, Manitoba
21:00 ADT	Ohin (yellow card) 23'; Venâncio (yellow card) 58'	Report	Baï (yellow card) 71'; Dias (yellow card) 87'; Dias 90'	Stadium: Princess Auto Stadium; Attendance: 2,397; Referee: Fabrizio Stasolla

3 May 2025 5	Halifax Wanderers FC	0–0	Forge FC	Halifax, Nova Scotia
17:00 ADT	Meilleur-Giguère (yellow card) 86'	Report	Hojabrpour (yellow card) 79'; Nimick (yellow card) 90+1'; Nana Ampomah (yellow card) 90+5'	Stadium: Wanderers Grounds; Attendance: 6,104; Referee: Mario Al-Ayass

10 May 2025 6	Halifax Wanderers FC	0–3	Cavalry FC	Halifax, Nova Scotia
17:30 ADT	Alphonse (yellow card) 74'	Report	Warschewski 45+1' (pen.); Carducci (yellow card) 81'; Musse 82'; Musse 84'; Daley (yellow card) 90+1'	Stadium: Wanderers Grounds; Attendance: 5,044; Referee: Sebastian Noshinravani

17 May 2025 7	Vancouver FC	0-2	Halifax Wanderers FC	Langley, British Columbia
21:00 ADT	Campagna (yellow card) 20'; Norman Jr. (yellow card) 40'	Report	Yesli (yellow card) 53'; Telfer 59'; Bahamboula (yellow card) 53'; Coimbra 90+4'	Stadium: Willoughby Community Park; Attendance: 1,308; Referee: Roberto D'Alesio

24 May 2025 8	Halifax Wanderers FC	2-0	Atlético Ottawa	Halifax, Nova Scotia
16:00 ADT	Bahamboula (yellow card) 6'; Meilleur-Giguère 75'; Coimbra 79' (pen.); Rushenas (yellow card) 81'; Coimbra (yellow card) 82'; Biello (yellow card) 90+1'	Report	dos Santos (yellow card) 25'; Abatneh (yellow card) 66'; Mejia (yellow card) 66'	Stadium: Wanderers Grounds; Attendance: 6,077; Referee: Michael Venne

31 May 2025 9	York United FC	2-0	Halifax Wanderers FC	Québec City, Québec
17:00 ADT	Ferrazzo (yellow card) 12'; Altobelli 29'; Urtiaga (yellow card) 86'; León (yellow card) 88'; Yeates 89'; Reid (yellow card) 90'; Botello (yellow card) 90+3'	Report	Callegari (yellow card) 51'; Pearlman (yellow card) 61'	Stadium: Telus Stadium; Attendance: 7,218; Referee: Sebastian Noshinravani
Note: This game was played in Quebec City as part of the "CPL on Tour" promotion.

8 June 2025 10	Forge FC	2-1	Halifax Wanderers	Hamilton, Ontario
16:30 ADT	Hojabrpour (yellow card) 16'; Massunda 25'; Wright 76'	Report	Mekidèche (yellow card) 41'; Telfer (yellow card) 43'; Bahamboula 82'	Stadium: Hamilton Stadium; Attendance: 6,793; Referee: Carly Shaw-MacLaren

14 June 2025 11	Halifax Wanderers FC	1-1	Cavalry FC	Halifax, Nova Scotia
16:00 ADT	Coimbra 8'; Telfer (yellow card) 32'; Johnston (yellow card) 78'; Sow (yellow card) 90+4'	Report	Kobza (yellow card) 39'; Elva 69'	Stadium: Wanderers Grounds; Attendance: 6,339; Referee: Ben Hoskins

21 June 2025 12	Halifax Wanderers FC	1-0	Vancouver FC	Halifax, Nova Scotia
16:00 ADT	Johnston (yellow card) 12'; Coimbra (yellow card) 25'; Meilleur-Giguère 77'; Callegari (yellow card) 80'	Report	Enyou (yellow card) 17'; Bah (yellow card) 85'	Stadium: Wanderers Grounds; Attendance: 6,480; Referee: Renzo Villanueva

1 July 2025 13	Halifax Wanderers FC	3-1	Valour FC	Halifax, Nova Scotia
16:00 ADT	Baï (yellow card) 45+1'; Pearlman (yellow card) 60'; Coimbra 67'; Rea (yellow card) 80'; Dias 84'; Coimbra 86'	Report	Venâncio (yellow card) 13'; Williams 19'; Faria (yellow card) 90+4'	Stadium: Wanderers Grounds; Attendance: 7,049; Referee: Carly Shaw-MacLaren

12 July 2025 14	Pacific FC	3-2	Halifax Wanderers FC	Langford, British Columbia
19:00 ADT	Toualy 11'; Toualy 42'; Toualy 55' (pen.); Heard (yellow card) 58'; Melvin (yellow card) 90+4'	Report	Pearlman (yellow card) 14'; Coimbra 30'; Baï 35'; Rea (yellow card) 41'; Johnston (yellow card) 60'	Stadium: Starlight Stadium; Attendance: 2,576; Referee: Mario Alayass

18 July 2025 15	Atlético Ottawa	2-0	Halifax Wanderers FC	Ottawa, Ontario
20:00 ADT	Salter 10'; Tabla 47' (pen.)	Report	Coimbra (yellow card) 65'; Timoteo (yellow card) 73'	Stadium: TD Place; Attendance: 5,119; Referee: Michael Venne

25 July 2025 16	Halifax Wanderers FC	1-2	Forge FC	Halifax, Nova Scotia
19:00 ADT	Telfer 23'; Rampersad (yellow card) 45'; Timoteo (yellow card) 90'	Report	Paton 7'; Babouli (yellow card) 24'; Jevremović (yellow card) 39'; Wright (yellow card) 53'; Filion 88'	Stadium: Wanderers Grounds; Attendance: 6,577; Referee: Seyed-Mohammad Mohseni

4 August 2025 17	Halifax Wanderers FC	1-2	Vancouver FC	Halifax, Nova Scotia
16:00 ADT	Johnston (yellow card) 53'; Gheisar (yellow card) 80'; Meilleur-Giguère 89'	Report	Campagna 40'; Mbongue 46'; Fry (yellow card) 83'; Essoussi (yellow card) 84'; Mezquida (yellow card) 90+5'	Stadium: Wanderers Grounds; Attendance: 7,143; Referee: Alain Ruch

9 Aug 2025 18	Cavalry FC	0-0	Halifax Wanderers FC	Calgary, Alberta
18:00 ADT	Kobza (yellow card) 36'; Baldisimo (yellow card) 38'; Camargo (yellow card) 82'	Report	Alphonse (yellow card) 13'; Callegari (yellow card) 34'; Yesli (yellow card) 73'; Timoteo (yellow card) 86'	Stadium: ATCO Field; Attendance: 3,988; Referee: Sebastian Noshinravani

16 Aug 2025 19	Pacific FC	2-2	Halifax Wanderers FC	Langford, British Columbia
19:00 ADT	Chung 32'; Daniels 45+2'; Zanatta (yellow card) 61'; Young (yellow card) 71'	Report	Mansour 18' (o.g.); Coimbra 30'; Callegari (yellow card) 45+1'	Stadium: Starlight Stadium; Attendance: 2,879; Referee: Seyed-Mohammad Mohseni

22 Aug 2025 20	Halifax Wanderers FC	4-1	Valour FC	Halifax, Nova Scotia
19:00 ADT	Facchineri 38' (o.g.); Alphonse (yellow card) 40'; Coimbra 57' (pen.); Coimbra 73'; Coimbra 77'; Coimbra (yellow card) 78'	Report	Dos Santos (yellow card) 58'; Venâncio (yellow card) 74'; Ressurreição 83'	Stadium: Wanderers Grounds; Attendance: 6,581; Referee: Scott Bowman

1 Sept 2025 21	Halifax Wanderers FC	4-0	York United FC	Halifax, Nova Scotia
16:00 ADT	Dias 11'; Bahamboula 26' (pen.); Timoteo (yellow card) 45+2'; Bahamboula 57'; Sow (yellow card) 75'; Baï 80'	Report	Bitar (yellow card) 24'; Kibato (yellow card) 54'; León (yellow card) 70'; Altobelli (yellow card) 89'; León (yellow card) 90+3'	Stadium: Wanderers Grounds; Attendance: 6,811; Referee: Renzo Villanueva

6 Sept 2025 22	Forge FC	0-1	Halifax Wanderers FC	Hamilton, Ontario
17:00 ADT	Massunda (yellow card) 40'; Rama (yellow card) 62'; Babouli 81'; Ampomah (yellow card) 83'	Report	Bahamboula (yellow card) 10'; Yesli (yellow card) 30'; Callegari (yellow card) 48'; Rea (yellow card) 57'	Stadium: Hamilton Stadium; Attendance: 6,825; Referee: Mario Alayass

13 Sept 2025 23	Cavalry FC	3-1	Halifax Wanderers FC	Calgary, Alberta
17:00 ADT	Kobza 33'; Musse 46'; Camargo 53'; Ntignee (yellow card) 69'; Kobza (yellow card) 72'; Kamdem (yellow card) 73'; Baldisimo (yellow card) 74'	Report	Rampersad (yellow card) 50'; Pearlman 57'; Pearlman (yellow card) 58'; Mekidèche (yellow card) 78'; Dunn (yellow card) 90+2'	Stadium: ATCO Field; Attendance: 4,231; Referee: Roberto D'Alesio

20 Sept 2025 24	Halifax Wanderers FC	3-0	Pacific FC	Halifax, Nova Scotia
16:00 ADT	Pearlman (yellow card) 32'; Johnston 51'; Callegari 55' (pen.); Rea 69'; Rea (yellow card) 86'	Report	Young (yellow card) 27'; Juhmi (yellow card) 37'; Heard (yellow card) 72'; Greco-Taylor (yellow card) 86'	Stadium: Wanderers Grounds; Attendance: 6,978; Referee: Carly Shaw-MacLaren

28 Sept 2025 25	Vancouver FC	3-1	Halifax Wanderers FC	Langley, British Columbia
19:00 ADT	O'Connor (yellow card) 18'; Fry (yellow card) 26'; Mbongue 35'; Mbongue 44'; Mbongue (yellow card) 60'; Pathé 90+2'	Report	Baï (yellow card) 45+2'; Alphonse (yellow card) 54'; Meilleur-Giguère 90+4'	Stadium: Willoughby Community Park; Attendance: 1,318; Referee: Fabrizio Stasolla

4 Oct 2025 26	Halifax Wanderers FC	1-1	York United FC	Halifax, Nova Scotia
15:00 ADT	Mekidèche 15'; Pearlman (yellow card) 36'; Timoteo (yellow card) 45+3'; Baï (yellow card) 90+5'	Report	Ferrari (yellow card) 45+1'; López (yellow card) 45+3'; Sturing (yellow card) 62'; Ferrin 68'; Ferrazzo (yellow card) 90+3'	Stadium: Wanderers Grounds; Attendance: 6,188; Referee: Scott Bowman

11 Oct 2025 27	Valour FC	0-3	Halifax Wanderers FC	Winnipeg, Manitoba
15:00 ADT	Alarcón (yellow card) 54'; Ressurreição (yellow card) 60'; Konincks (yellow card) 82'; Dos Santos (yellow card) 84'; Twardek (yellow card) 85'	Report	Pearlman 35'; Callegari (yellow card) 40'; Rushenas (yellow card) 70'; Johnston 76'; Pearlman (yellow card) 81'; Coimbra 83' (pen.)	Stadium: Princess Auto Stadium; Referee: Ben Hoskins

18 Oct 2025 28	Halifax Wanderers FC	0-1	Atlético Ottawa	Halifax, Nova Scotia
17:00 ADT	Baï (yellow card) 40'; Johnston (yellow card) 60'; Gagnon-Laparé (yellow card) 90+4'	Report	Ennin 89'; Aparicio (yellow card) 90+4'; Mejía (red card) 90+5'	Stadium: Wanderers Grounds; Attendance: 6,232; Referee: Fabrizio Stasolla

==== Playoff matches ====
The Wanderers qualified for the CPL playoffs on September 20. After attaining fourth place in the regular season, Halifax's first game would be hosting the fifth-place team, York United in a knockout match. The evening game went through multiple lightning delays as well as an overtime period before York United prevailed in penalty kicks. Within 48 hours of the game's conclusion, the Wanderers announced that Patrice Gheisar's contract would not be renewed.

October 22 Knockout match	Halifax Wanderers FC	2–2 (4-5 p)	York United	Halifax, Nova Scotia,
19:30 ADT	Rea (yellow card) 13'; Coimbra 45+1'; Alphonse (yellow card) 51'; Callegari (yellow card) 66'; Gagnon-Laparé (yellow card) 105'; Gagnon-Laparé 114'; Johnston (yellow card) 118'	Report	Ferrazzo (yellow card) 16'; Reid (yellow card) 26'; Kibato (yellow card) 38'; Bitar (yellow card) 82'; Altobelli 86'; Jimoh (yellow card) 90'; Hundal 118'	Stadium: Wanderers Grounds; Attendance: 5,420; Referee: Sebastian Noshinravani
	Shootout
	Coimbra (penalty scored); Callegari (penalty missed); Timoteo (penalty scored); Johnston (penalty scored); Baï (penalty scored); Gagnon-Laparé (penalty missed)		(penalty scored) Altobelli; (penalty scored) Bitar; (penalty scored) Hundal; (penalty missed) Yeates; (penalty scored) Ferrin; (penalty scored) Kibato

=== Canadian Championship ===
May 7 Preliminary round	Forge FC (Ontario)	3-1	(Nova Scotia) Halifax Wanderers FC	Hamilton, Ontario
8:00 pm	Babouli 21', 90'; Sow 25' (o.g.); Nimick (yellow card) 56'; Paton (yellow card) 60'; Jensen (yellow card) 81'	Report	Meilleur-Giguère 40'; Sow (yellow card) 73'	Stadium: Hamilton Stadium; Attendance: 3,098; Referee: Alain Ruch
