= 2024 HFX Wanderers FC season =

Halifax Wanderers
2024 season
- President: Derek Martin
- Head coach: Patrice Gheisar
- Stadium: Wanderers Grounds
- Canadian Premier League: 6th
- Canadian Championship: Eliminated in preliminary round
- Top goalscorer: League: Daniel Nimick (8); All: Daniel Nimick (9)
- Highest home attendance: 6,500
- Lowest home attendance: 5,384
- Average home league attendance: 6,058
Home colours	Away colours

The 2024 HFX Wanderers FC season was the sixth season in the history of HFX Wanderers FC. In addition to the Canadian Premier League, the club competed in the Canadian Championship. During the off-season, coach Patrice Gheisar signed a two-year contract extension. The season was noteworthy for a difficult beginning, where the team set a league record for worst start to a season, and was eliminated from the Canadian Championship in the first round by losing to the Ligue 1 Québec club CS Saint-Laurent. The Wanderers also set a league record for most red cards in a season, with eight.

The six points earned on away games was tied for the second-lowest amount in CPL history, matching the 1-3-10 away record the HFX Wanderers FC ended with in 2019. Only FC Edmonton fared worse in 2022 with four points.

The average home attendance of 6,058 set a new club record.

== Squad ==
As of September 13, 2024

No.	Player	Nationality	Position(s)	Date of birth (age)	Previous club	Notes
Goalkeepers
1	Yann-Alexandre Fillion	(Canada)	GK	February 14, 1996 (aged 28)	(Finland) IFK Mariehamn	
12	Daniel Clarke	(England)	GK	April 17, 2003 (aged 21)	(Canada) CBU Capers	U21, U-S
13	Aiden Rushenas	(Canada)	GK	May 23, 2003 (aged 21)	(Canada) Dalhousie Tigers	U21
Defenders
2	Daniel Nimick	(Canada)	CB	September 22, 2000 (aged 24)	(United States) Western Michigan Broncos	
3	Zachary Fernandez	(Canada)	RB	September 24, 2001 (aged 23)	(Canada) A.S. Blainville	
4	Julian Dunn	(Canada)	CB	July 11, 2000 (aged 24)	(Finland) HamKam	IL
5	Cale Loughrey	(Canada)	CB	August 4, 2001 (aged 23)	(Canada) FC Edmonton	
16	Kareem Sow	(Canada)	CB	September 28, 2000 (aged 24)	(Canada) Montreal Carabins	
17	Wesley Timoteo	(Canada)	FB / RW / LW	April 9, 2000 (aged 24)	(Canada) FC Edmonton	
21	Jefferson Alphonse	(Canada)	CB	June 12, 2003 (aged 21)	(Canada) CS Saint-Laurent	U21
23	Riley Ferrazzo	(Canada)	FB	August 4, 1999 (aged 25)	(Canada) Vaughan Azzurri	
34	Yorgos Gavas	(Canada)	CB	November 1, 2006 (aged 18)	(Canada) Suburban FC	DEV
	David Mavakala	(Democratic Republic of the Congo)	FB	February 24, 2006 (aged 18)	(Canada) CF Montréal U23	DEV
	Nassim Mekideche	(Algeria)	CB	April 30, 2000 (aged 24)	(Tunisia) US Monastir	
Midfielders
6	Lorenzo Callegari	(France)	CM	February 27, 1998 (aged 26)	(France) Chambly	INT
7	Ryan Telfer	(Trinidad and Tobago)	LW	March 4, 1994 (aged 30)	(United States) Miami FC	
10	Aidan Daniels	(Canada)	AM	September 6, 1998 (aged 26)	(United States) OKC Energy	
11	Vitor Dias	(Brazil)	AM	April 30, 1998 (aged 26)	(United States) Sporting Kansas City II	INT
14	Clément Bayiha	(Canada)	RW / RB	March 8, 1999 (aged 25)	(Canada) York United	Loan
18	Andre Rampersad	(Trinidad and Tobago)	CM	February 2, 1995 (aged 29)	(Trinidad and Tobago) Santa Rosa	INT
27	Giorgio Probo	(Italy)	CM	July 19, 1999 (aged 25)	(United States) Vermont Green	INT
28	Jérémy Gagnon-Laparé	(Canada)	CM	March 9, 1995 (aged 29)	(Canada) York United	
41	Camilo Vasconcelos	(Canada)	AM	March 19, 2005 (aged 19)	(Canada) Guelph United	U21
Forwards
8	Massimo Ferrin	(Canada)	CF / RW / LW	December 6, 1998 (aged 26)	(Canada) Vaughan Azzurri	
19	Tiago Coimbra	(Canada)	CF	January 17, 2004 (aged 20)	(Brazil) Palmeiras	U21
20	Tavio Ciccarelli	(Canada)	CF	July 24, 2006 (aged 18)	(England) Sheffield United Academy	U21, EYT
33	Sean Rea	(Canada)	CF / CM	May 15, 2002 (aged 22)	(Spain) Castellón B	

== Transfers ==
=== In ===
No.	Pos.	Player	From club	Fee/notes	Date	Source
	MF	(Canada) Jérémy Gagnon-Laparé	(Canada) York United	Free	January 25, 2024	
	MF	(Trinidad and Tobago) Ryan Telfer	(United States) Miami FC	Free	February 7, 2024	
	DF	(Canada) Kareem Sow	(Canada) Montreal Carabins	Free	February 12, 2024	
	MF	(Brazil) Vitor Dias	(United States) Sporting Kansas City II	Free	February 14, 2024	
	FW	(United States) Christian Volesky	(United States) Monterey Bay FC	Free	February 14, 2024	
	MF	(Canada) Camilo Vasconcelos	(Canada) Guelph United	Free	February 16, 2024	
	MF	(Italy) Giorgio Probo	(United States) Vermont Green	Free	February 19, 2024	
	DF	(Canada) Julian Dunn	(Norway) HamKam	Free	February 21, 2024	
	FW	(Canada) Remi Agunbiade	(Canada) Vaughan Azzurri	Signed to a development contract	March 28, 2024	
	GK	(England) Daniel Clarke	(Canada) CBU Capers	Selected 5th in the 2024 CPL–U Sports Draft, U-Sports contract	April 10, 2024	
	DF	(Canada) Yorgos Gavas	(Canada) Suburban FC	Signed to a development contract	April 23, 2024	
	FW	(Canada) Tavio Ciccarelli	(England) Sheffield United Academy	Free	May 31, 2024	
	DF	(Canada) Jefferson Alphonse	(Canada) CS Saint-Laurent	Free	June 29, 2024	
	FW	(Canada) Sean Rea	(Spain) Castellón B	Free	July 31, 2024	
	DF	(Algeria) Nassim Mekidèche	(Tunisia) US Monastir	Free	September 13, 2024	
	DF	(Democratic Republic of the Congo) David Mavakala	(Canada) CF Montréal U23	Signed to a development contract	September 13, 2024	

==== Loans in ====
No.	Pos.	Player	Loaned from	Fee/notes	Date	Source
	MF	(Canada) Clément Bayiha	(Canada) York United	Loaned until end of season	May 28, 2024	

==== Draft picks ====
HFX Wanderers selected the following players in the 2024 CPL–U Sports Draft. Draft picks are not automatically signed to the team roster. Only those who are signed to a contract will be listed as transfers in.

Round	Selection	Pos.	Player	Nationality	University
1	5	GK	Daniel Clarke	England	Cape Breton
2	13	DF	Max Bodurtha	Canada	St. Francis Xavier

=== Out ===
No.	Pos.	Player	To club	Fee/notes	Date	Source
11	MF	(Brazil) João Morelli	Retired		November 3, 2023	
22	DF	(Canada) Mohamed Omar	(United States) San Antonio FC	Contract expired	December 31, 2023	
21	FW	(Canada) Jordan Perruzza	(Canada) Toronto FC	Loan ended	December 31, 2023	
4	DF	(Canada) Cristian Campagna		Option declined	December 31, 2023	
15	DF	(Canada) Doneil Henry		Option declined	December 31, 2023	
7	DF	(Canada) Ryan James		Option declined	December 31, 2023	
20	DF	(Canada) Jake Ruby		Option declined	December 31, 2023	
13	MF	(Canada) Armaan Wilson		Option declined	December 31, 2023	
37	MF	(England) Lifumpa Mwandwe	(England) Newtown	Option declined	December 31, 2023	
9	FW	(France) Théo Collomb		Option declined	December 31, 2023	
14	MF	(England) Callum Watson	(United States) Chattanooga FC	Undisclosed fee	January 26, 2024	
9	FW	(United States) Christian Volesky		Contract terminated by mutual consent	August 7, 2024	

==== Loans out ====
No.	Pos.	Player	Loaned to	Fee/notes	Date	Source
24	MF	(Canada) Tomas Giraldo	(Canada) York United	Loaned until end of season	May 28, 2024	

== Competitions ==
Matches are listed in Halifax local time: Atlantic Daylight Time (UTC−3)

=== Overview ===
Competition	First match	Last match	Starting round	Final position	Record							
Competition	First match	Last match	Starting round	Final position	Pld	W	D	L	GF	GA	GD	Win %
Canadian Premier League	April 13	October 19	Matchday 1		5	0	1	4	3	9	−6	0.00
Canadian Championship	May 2		First round	First round	1	0	1	0	2	2	+0	0.00
Total					6	0	2	4	5	11	−6	0.00

Last updated: May 20
Source: Competitions

=== Canadian Premier League ===
==== Table ====
Pos	Team	Pld	W	D	L	GF	GA	GD	Pts	Playoff qualification
1	Forge (S)	28	15	5	8	45	31	+14	50	First semifinal
2	Cavalry (C)	28	12	12	4	39	27	+12	48	First semifinal
3	Atlético Ottawa	28	11	11	6	42	31	+11	44	Quarterfinal
4	York United	28	11	6	11	35	36	−1	39	Play-in round
5	Pacific	28	9	7	12	27	32	−5	34	Play-in round
6	HFX Wanderers	28	7	9	12	37	43	−6	30 (Note: Head-to-head points: HFX Wanderers 7, Vancouver 4)	
7	Vancouver	28	7	9	12	29	43	−14	30	
8	Valour	28	7	7	14	31	42	−11	28	

Source: CanPL
Rules for classification: 1) Points; 2) Total number of wins; 3) Head-to-head; 4) Goal differential; 5) Goals for; 6) Away goals differential; 7) Away goals for; 8) Home goals differential; 9) Home goals for; 10) Fewest disciplinary points; 11) Most under-21 domestic player minutes; 12) Drawing of lots.
(C) Champion (qualified to Champions Cup Round one); (S) CPL Shield winner (qualified to Champions Cup Round one)

==== Results by match ====
Match	1	2	3	4	5	6	7	8	9	10	11	12	13	14	15	16	17	18	19	20	21	22	23	24	25	26	27	28
Result	L	L	L	D	L	L	D	D	D	W	W	L	W	L	W	L	L	L	D	W	L	W	D	D	D	D	L	W
Position	7	6	7	7	8	8	8	8	8	8	8	8	7	8	8	8	8	8	8	8	8	8	8	7	8	7	8	6

Updated to match(es) played on October 23. Source: #Matches
W = Win; D = Draw; L = Loss

==== Matches ====
13 April 2024	Pacific FC	1–0	Halifax Wanderers FC	Langford, British Columbia
20:00 ADT	Moore (yellow card) 25'; Meilleur-Giguère (yellow card) 28'; Sellouf 35'(pen.); Ndom (yellow card) 56'	Report	Nimick (yellow card) 86'	Stadium: Starlight Stadium; Attendance: 4,367; Referee: Michael Venne

18 April 2024	Vancouver FC	2–0	Halifax Wanderers FC	Langley, British Columbia
23:00 ADT	Romeo (yellow card) 4'; Romeo 17'; Díaz (yellow card) 44'; Díaz 52'; Kibato (yellow card) 84'; Chung (yellow card) 87'	Report		Stadium: Willoughby Community Park Stadium; Attendance: 2,702; Referee: Sebastian Noshinravan

27 April 2024	Halifax Wanderers FC	1–3	Atlético Ottawa	Halifax, Nova Scotia
14:00 ADT	Callegari (red card) 19'; Gagnon-Laparé (yellow card) 78'; Ferrazzo 89'	Report	Twardek (yellow card) 31'; del Campo 39'; Aparicio 39'; Tabla (yellow card) 68'; Tabla 73'	Stadium: Wanderers Grounds; Attendance: 6,500; Referee: Ben Hoskins

11 May 2024	Halifax Wanderers FC	1–1	Cavalry FC	Halifax, Nova Scotia
15:00 ADT	Coimbra (yellow card) 28'; Nimick (yellow card) 33'; Gagnon-Laparé (yellow card) 33'; Fernandez (yellow card) 42'; Telfer (yellow card) 45'; Probo 78'	Report	Trafford (yellow card) 34'; Akio 58'; Daley (yellow card) 69'; Kamdem (yellow card) 89'	Stadium: Wanderers Grounds; Attendance: 5,544; Referee: Carly Shaw-MacLaren

20 May 2024	Halifax Wanderers FC	1–2	Valour FC	Halifax, Nova Scotia
16:00 ADT	Nimick 67' (pen.); Nimick (yellow card) 73'; Fernandez (yellow card) 87'	Report	Murasiranwa (yellow card) 15'; Verhoeven (yellow card) 43'; Ressurreição 49'; Sánchez (yellow card) 58'; Faria (yellow card) 59'; Antonoglou (yellow card) 74'; Swibel 75'	Stadium: Wanderers Grounds; Attendance: 6,413; Referee: Myriam Marcotte

24 May 2024	York United FC	2-1	Halifax Wanderers FC	Toronto, Ontario
20:00 ADT	Ricci 20'; Salanović 32'; Botello (yellow card) 65'; Córdova (yellow card) 86'	Report	Dunn (yellow card) 8'; Fernandez (yellow card) 18'; Telfer 82'	Stadium: York Lions Stadium; Attendance: 1,226; Referee: Sebastian Noshiravani

2 June 2024	Atlético Ottawa	2-2	Halifax Wanderers FC	Ottawa, Ontario
15:00 ADT	Tabla (yellow card) 30'; Bassett 84'; de Brienne (yellow card) 90+2'; Roy (yellow card) 90+11'; Zapater 90+11'	Report	Callegari (yellow card) 14'; Ferrazzo 21'; Coimbra 75'; Coimbra (red card) 86'; Fillion (yellow card) 81'; Timoteo (yellow card) 90+8'	Stadium: TD Place Stadium; Attendance: 5,224; Referee: Renzo Villanueva

8 June 2024	Halifax Wanderers FC	0-0	Pacific FC	Halifax, Nova Scotia
15:00 ADT	Callegari (yellow card) 8'; Fillion (yellow card) 82'; Fernandez (yellow card) 82'	Report	Quintana (red card) 53'; Gazdov (yellow card) 87'; Greco Taylor (yellow card) 88'; Lamothe (yellow card) 88'	Stadium: Wanderers Grounds; Attendance: 6,034; Referee: Yusri Rudolf

15 June 2024	Halifax Wanderers FC	2–2	Forge FC	Halifax, Nova Scotia
17:00 ADT	Ferrin 52'; Ferrin 65' (pen.); Timoteo (yellow card) 79'	Report	Achinioti-Jönsson (yellow card) 9'; Hojabrpour (yellow card) 48'; Badibanga 49'; Duncan (yellow card) 64'; Poku 90+2'; Opoku Ampomah (yellow card) 90+3'	Stadium: Wanderers Grounds; Attendance: 5,384; Referee: Scott Bowman

23 June 2024	Vancouver FC	0–4	Halifax Wanderers FC	Langley, British Columbia
20:00 ADT	Gee (yellow card) 61'; Verhoven (yellow card) 74'	Report	Telfer 9', 18'; Fernandez (yellow card) 51'; Fillion (yellow card) 56'; Rampersad (red card) 68'; Nimick 77', 90' (pen.); Probo (yellow card) 81'	Stadium: Willoughby Community Park Stadium; Attendance: 3,060; Referee: Sebastian Noshinravani

1 July 2024	Halifax Wanderers FC	1–0	Cavalry FC	Halifax, Nova Scotia
17:00 ADT	Callegari (yellow card) 19'; Telfer 49'; Gagnon-Laparé (yellow card) 77'	Report	Kobza (yellow card) 17'; Trafford (yellow card) 37'; Field (yellow card) 69'	Stadium: Wanderers Grounds; Attendance: 6,200; Referee: Marie-Soleil Beaudoin

6 July 2024	York United FC	2–1	Halifax Wanderers FC	Toronto, Ontario
17:00 ADT	Voytsekhovskyy 17'; Martínez (yellow card) 51'; Córdova 58'	Report	Gagnon-Laparé (yellow card) 18'; Fillion (yellow card) 77'; Loughrey (yellow card) 77'; Probo 87'; Fernandez (yellow card) 90+2'	Stadium: York Lions Stadium; Attendance: 1,279; Referee: Mathieu Souaré

18 July 2024	Halifax Wanderers FC	3–1	Valour FC	Halifax, Nova Scotia
19:00 ADT	Loughrey 22'; Nimick 26' (pen.); Ferrazzo (yellow card) 37'; Nimick 53' (pen.)	Report	Hundal 15'; Facchineri (yellow card) 24'; Viscosi (yellow card) 53'; Verhoeven (yellow card) 82'	Stadium: Wanderers Grounds; Attendance: 6,242; Referee: Fabrizio Stasolla

27 July 2024	Forge FC	3-0	Halifax Wanderers FC	Hamilton, Ontario
20:00 ADT	Poku 15'; Poku 28'; Ampomah (yellow card) 40'; Poku (yellow card) 57'; Ampomah 69'; Owolabi-Belewu (yellow card) 90+1'	Report	Rampersad (yellow card) 83'	Stadium: Tim Hortons Field; Attendance: 6,179; Referee: Michael Venne

5 August 2024	Halifax Wanderers FC	3-2	Vancouver FC	Halifax, Nova Scotia
16:00 ADT	Coimbra 20'; Rampersad 55'; Nimick 63' (pen.); Fernandez (yellow card) 69'	Report	Cantave 4'; Garcia (yellow card) 29'; Romeo (yellow card) 36'; Cantave (yellow card) 44'; Gee (yellow card) 61'; Norman Jr. (yellow card) 90+5'; Díaz 90+7'	Stadium: Wanderers Grounds; Attendance: 6,500; Referee: Renzo Villanueva

10 August 2024	Cavalry FC	3-2	Halifax Wanderers FC	Calgary, Alberta
17:00 ADT	Klomp 10'; Loughrey 21' (o.g.); Musse (yellow card) 59'; Klomp 66'; Tommy Wheeldon Jr. (yellow card) 84'	Report	Coimbra 12'; Fillion (yellow card) 60'; Nimick 70' (pen.); Alphonse (yellow card) 90'	Stadium: ATCO Field; Attendance: 4,695; Referee: Mario Alayass

14 August 2024	Forge FC	2-0	Halifax Wanderers FC	Hamilton, Ontario
20:00 ADT	Hojabrpour 45+2'; Ampomah (yellow card) 61'; Hamilton 63'; Badibanga (yellow card) 67'; Samuel (yellow card) 82'	Report	Telfer (yellow card) 15'; Gagnon-Laparé (yellow card) 33' (red card) 33'; Daniels (yellow card) 43'; Patrice Gheisar (yellow card) 44'	Stadium: Tim Hortons Field; Attendance: 3,983; Referee: Michael Venne
Note: Game rescheduled from 7 May 2024 due to conflict with the Canadian Championship game between Forge FC and CF Montreal.

17 August 2024	Valour FC	2-1	Halifax Wanderers FC	Winnipeg, Manitoba
16:00 ADT	Swibel (yellow card) 33'; Facchineri (yellow card) 36'; Nimick 38' (o.g.); Ressurreição (yellow card) 50'; Hundal (yellow card) 62'; Swibel 63'; Antonoglou (yellow card) 90+5'	Report	Rea (yellow card) 17'; Ferrin 23'	Stadium: Princess Auto Stadium; Attendance: 3,099; Referee: Myriam Marcotte

24 August 2024	Halifax Wanderers FC	1-1	Atlético Ottawa	Halifax, Nova Scotia
14:00 ADT	Fillion (yellow card) 39'; Nimick 90+6' (pen.)	Report	Aparicio (yellow card) 33'; de Brienne (yellow card) 47'; Didić (yellow card) 61'; del Campo (yellow card) 81'; Zapater (yellow card) 84'; Salter 90+2'	Stadium: Wanderers Grounds; Attendance: 6,359; Referee: Roberto D'Alesio

2 September 2024	Halifax Wanderers FC	2-1	York United FC	Halifax, Nova Scotia
14:00 ADT	Ferrin 22'; Fillion (yellow card) 42'; Gagnon-Laparé (yellow card) 64'; Fernandez 67'; Callegari (yellow card) 75'; Nimick (yellow card) 90+2'	Report	Ferrari (yellow card) 39'; Córdova (yellow card) 57'; Márquez (yellow card) 70'; Nimick 76' (o.g.)	Stadium: Wanderers Grounds; Attendance: 6,022; Referee: Yusri Rudolf

7 September 2024	Pacific FC	3-0	Halifax Wanderers FC	Langford, British Columbia
23:00 ADT	Tirocveanu 33'; Quintana (yellow card) 38'; Toussaint (yellow card) 53'; Zanatta 63' (pen.); Dyer 81'; Bahous (yellow card) 88'	Report	Coimbra (yellow card) 9'; Nimick (yellow card) 38' (red card) 43'; Gagnon-Laparé (yellow card) 52'; Alphonse (yellow card) 62'; Loughrey (yellow card) 74' (red card) 74'	Stadium: Starlight Stadium; Attendance: 3,283

14 September 2024	Halifax Wanderers FC	3-0	Forge FC	Halifax, Nova Scotia
15:00 ADT	Rampersad (yellow card) 6'; Probo 30'; Rea (yellow card) 49'; Andre Rampersad 53'; Rea 61'	Report	Achinioti-Jönsson (yellow card) 28'; Parra (yellow card) 56'; Cissé (yellow card) 74'	Stadium: Wanderers Grounds; Attendance: 6,127

18 September 2024	Halifax Wanderers FC	2-2	Pacific FC	Halifax, Nova Scotia
19:00 ADT	Nimick (yellow card) 20' (red card) 31'; Ferrin 60'; Probo (yellow card) 64'; Mekideche 79'; Gagnon-Laparé (yellow card) 90'; Fillion (yellow card) 90+8'	Report	Meilleur-Giguère (yellow card) 11'; Dyer 67'; Meilleur-Giguère 90+6'	Stadium: Wanderers Grounds; Attendance: 5,793
Note: Game rescheduled from 11 July 2024 due to conflict with the Canadian Championship game between Pacific FC and Vancouver Whitecaps FC.

21 September 2024	Valour FC	1-1	Halifax Wanderers FC	Winnipeg, Manitoba
16:00 ADT	Alarcón (yellow card) 34'; Mourdoukoutas (yellow card) 35'; Faria (yellow card) 50'; Hundal 76'; Facchineri (yellow card) 86'	Report	Telfer (yellow card) 12'; Bayiha (yellow card) 18'; Mekideche (yellow card) 41'; Fernandez 89'; Alphonse (yellow card) 90+1'	Stadium: Princess Auto Stadium; Attendance: 2,938

29 September 2024	Atlético Ottawa	1-1	Halifax Wanderers FC	Ottawa, Ontario
15:00 ADT	Didić 4'; Ingham (yellow card) 19'; Carlos González (yellow card) 88'; del Amo (yellow card) 90+2'	Report	Mekidèche 79'; Alphonse (yellow card) 89'	Stadium: TD Place Stadium; Attendance: 5,662

5 October 2024	Halifax Wanderers FC	1-1	Vancouver FC	Halifax, Nova Scotia
15:00 ADT	Probo (yellow card) 33'; Gagnon-Laparé (yellow card) 35'; Fernandez (red card) 80'; Rea (yellow card) 83'; Nimick (yellow card) 87'; Dias 90+8'	Report	Bah (yellow card) 29' (red card) 32'; Romeo (yellow card) 45+1'; Díaz 50' (pen.); Bitar (yellow card) 53'; Ricci (yellow card) 80'	Stadium: Wanderers Grounds; Attendance: 5,850

12 October 2024	Cavalry FC	2-1	Halifax Wanderers FC	Calgary, Alberta
20:00 ADT	Aird (yellow card) 37'; Shome (yellow card) 45'; Warschewski 48'; Montgomery 79'	Report	Probo 53'; Gagnon-Laparé (yellow card) 58'; Mekidèche (yellow card) 77'	Stadium: ATCO Field; Attendance: 4,533

19 October 2024	Halifax Wanderers FC	2-1	York United FC	Halifax, Nova Scotia
TBD	Timoteo (yellow card) 9'; Fillion (yellow card) 43'; Ferrin 63'; Coimbra 82'; Coimbra (yellow card) 84'	Report	Nimick 9' (o.g.); Voytsekhovskyy (yellow card) 40'; Léon (yellow card) 44'; Córdova (yellow card) 54'	Stadium: Wanderers Grounds; Attendance: 5,844

=== Canadian Championship ===
Canada Soccer announced the preliminary round schedule for the Canadian Championship on March 11. Changes from the previous year include a later start date, assigned starting brackets, a home-and-away quarterfinal series, and a redraw for semi-final matchups, all of which allow the Wanderers a greater chance of hosting games in Halifax during the event. The preliminary round opponent for the Wanderers was CS Saint-Laurent, the championship team of Ligue1 Québec in 2023.

May 2 Preliminary round	Halifax Wanderers FC	2–2 (3–5 p)	CS Saint-Laurent	Halifax, Nova Scotia
7:00 pm	Callegari (yellow card) 11'; Nimick 29' (pen.); Loughrey (yellow card) 32'; Telfer 83'	Report	Kane 33' (pen.), (yellow card) 86'; Boughanmi (yellow card) 45+3'; Kwemi 65'; Mlah (yellow card) 76'; Wandje (yellow card) 76'; Aristilde (yellow card) 90+5'	Stadium: Wanderers Grounds; Referee: Filip Dujic
	Penalties
	Nimick (penalty scored); Callegari (penalty scored); Telfer (penalty scored); Volesky (penalty missed)		(penalty scored) Kwemi; (penalty scored) Mlah; (penalty scored) Boughanmi; (penalty scored) Sakande; (penalty scored) Kane
