= Aiden Rushenas =

Canadian soccer player

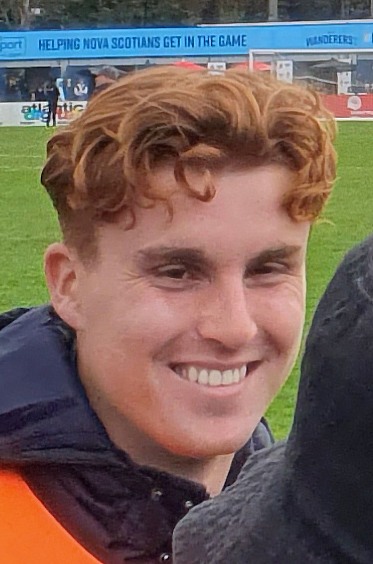
- Rushenas in 2023 at Wanderers Grounds

Personal information
- Date of birth: May 23, 2003 (age 23)
- Place of birth: Toronto, Ontario, Canada
- Height: 6 ft 3 in (1.91 m)
- Position: Goalkeeper

Team information
- Current team: DS Edusoccer

Youth career
- Weston Wolves SC
- Glen Shields SC
- 2021: North Toronto Nitros
- 2022: HFX Wanderers

College career
Years	Team	Apps	(Gls)
2021–2022	Dalhousie Tigers	23	(0)

Senior career*
Years	Team	Apps	(Gls)
2022–2025	HFX Wanderers FC	5	(0)
2026	Telavi	5	(0)
2026–	DS Edusoccer	0	(0)
- * Club domestic league appearances and goals as of October 27, 2025

Aiden Rushenas (born May 23, 2003) is a Canadian soccer player who plays for Puerto Rican club DS Edusoccer in the Liga Puerto Rico Pro

== Early life ==
Rushenas played with Glen Shields SC in the Ontario Soccer League’s U21 division, where he was named the 2019 Provincial Elite Goalkeeper of the Season. In 2021, he trained with the North Toronto Nitros of League1 Ontario. In 2022, he played with the HFX Wanderers U23 team.

== University career ==
In May 2021, Rushenas committed to attend Dalhousie University to play for the men's soccer team, beginning in September 2021. In his rookie season in 2021, he won the starting keeper role and went on to play every minute for the team that season and led the Atlantic University Sport Conference in saves with 81. In September 2022, he was named the AUS Male Athlete of the Week. At the end of the 2022 season, he was named an AUS Second Team All Star.

== Club career ==
During the 2022 season, Rushenas trained with the HFX Wanderers of the Canadian Premier League and signed a short-term contract to serve as the substitute goalkeeper in their match on August 1 against York United, as the team was short a goalkeeper. He also played with the HFX Wanderers U23 side that season. In December 2022, he was selected by the Wanderers in the second round (10th overall) of the 2023 CPL-U Sports Draft. In April 2023, he signed a developmental contract with the Wanderers, allowing him to maintain his university eligibility. On August 1, with his U Sports contract set to soon expire, he extended his contract for the remainder of the 2023 season. He signed a professional contract for the 2024 season, with an option for 2025. He made his professional debut on August 14, 2024 against Forge FC. He earned his first victory on October 19 against York United FC, earning CPL Team of the Week honours.

In March 2026, he signed with Telavi in the Georgian Erovnuli Liga 2.

== Career statistics ==
As of match played October 27, 2025

Club	Season	League			Playoffs		Domestic Cup		Continental		Total	
Club	Season	Division	Apps	Goals	Apps	Goals	Apps	Goals	Apps	Goals	Apps	Goals
HFX Wanderers FC	2022	Canadian Premier League	0	0	–		0	0	–		0	0
HFX Wanderers FC	2023	Canadian Premier League	0	0	0	0	0	0	–		0	0
HFX Wanderers FC	2024	Canadian Premier League	4	0	–		0	0	–		4	0
HFX Wanderers FC	2025	Canadian Premier League	1	0	0	0	0	0	–		1	0
Career total			5	0	0	0	0	0	0	0	5	0
