= Vitor Dias =

Brazilian footballer

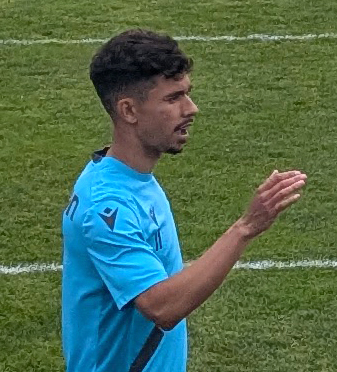
- Dias in 2025 with HFX Wanderers FC

Personal information
- Full name: Vitor Feitoza Almeida Dias
- Date of birth: 30 April 1998 (age 28)
- Place of birth: Brasília, Brazil
- Height: 1.78 m (5 ft 10 in)
- Position: Midfielder

Youth career
- São Paulo FC
- Boavista-RJ

College career
Years	Team	Apps	(Gls)
2019–2021	Marshall Thundering Herd	54	(14)

Senior career*
Years	Team	Apps	(Gls)
2022	St. Louis City 2	18	(6)
2023	Sporting Kansas City II	12	(1)
2024–2025	HFX Wanderers	39	(4)
- * Club domestic league appearances and goals as of 27 February 2026

Vitor Feitoza Almeida Dias (born 30 April 1998) is a Brazilian professional footballer who is currently a free agent.

== Early life ==
Dias played youth football in the São Paulo youth system, before later joining Boavista-RJ.

== College career ==
After beginning university in Brazil at Estácio de Sá University, in 2019, Dias began attending Marshall University for his sophomore year in the United States, where he played for the men's soccer team. After suffering an injury in preseason, he made his collegiate debut on 6 September 2019 against the Butler Bulldogs. On 27 September 2019, he scored his first collegiate goal in a victory over the Old Dominion Monarchs.

In his second season, he earned his first weekly honor, being named the Conference USA Offensive Player of the Week in February, following a two-goal and two-assist performance against the West Virginia Mountaineers. On 6 March, he had another two-goal performance in a 2–0 victory over the South Carolina Gamecocks. At the end of the season, he earned several Conference USA honors - All-First Team, Co-Midfielder of the Year, Offensive MVP, Player of the Year, and the Co-Male Athlete of the Year. He was also named to the All-Southeast Region First Team, a First-Team All-American, a MAC Hermann Trophy semi-finalist, and named to the NCAA All-Tournament Team, as Marshall won the national title.

Ahead of his senior season in 2021, he was named to the MAC Hermann Trophy Preseason watch list. In the first week of the season, he was named the Conference USA Offensive Player of the Week. He was named a finalist for the Senior CLASS Award. At the end of the season, he was named the Conference USA Co-Midfielder of the Year and selected to the All-First Team, named to the All-Southeast Region First Team, a Senior CLASS Second Team All-American and a Third-Team All-American. After the season, he was invited to participate in the MLS College Showcase.

== Club career ==
At the 2022 MLS SuperDraft, Dias was selected in the third round (86th overall) by Vancouver Whitecaps FC. However, he ultimately did not sign with the club and instead joined St. Louis City SC 2 in MLS Next Pro. On 25 March 2022, he scored a penalty kick in his debut in the first ever match in MLS Next Pro history against Rochester New York FC. In his first professional season, he scored six goals and added three assists, helping the club reach the playoff championship final, where they ultimately fell to Columbus Crew 2.

In April 2023, he signed with Sporting Kansas City II. On 9 August 2023, he scored his first goal in a match against the Tacoma Defiance.

In February 2024, he signed with Canadian Premier League club HFX Wanderers FC, through the 2025 season. Wanderers coach Patrice Gheisar had been interested in recruiting Dias since his time at Marshall University. On 5 October 2024, he scored in the eighth minute of second half stoppage time to give the Wanderers a 1-1 draw against Vancouver FC.

In January 2026, he signed with Tormenta FC in USL League One. However, 13 days before the 2026 season was set to begin, the club announced it was going on hiatus for the season, making Dias a free agent.

== Career statistics ==
As of 19 October 2024

Club	Season	League			Playoffs		Domestic Cup		Other		Total	
Club	Season	Division	Apps	Goals	Apps	Goals	Apps	Goals	Apps	Goals	Apps	Goals
St. Louis City SC 2	2022	MLS Next Pro	18	6	3	0	2	0	–		23	6
Sporting Kansas City II	2023	MLS Next Pro	12	1	1	0	–		–		13	1
HFX Wanderers FC	2024	Canadian Premier League	18	1	–		0	0	–		18	1
HFX Wanderers FC	2025	Canadian Premier League	21	3	0	0	1	0	—		22	3
HFX Wanderers FC	Total		39	4	0	0	1	0	0	0	40	4
Career total			79	11	4	0	3	0	0	0	89	11
