= Camilo Vasconcelos =

Canadian soccer player

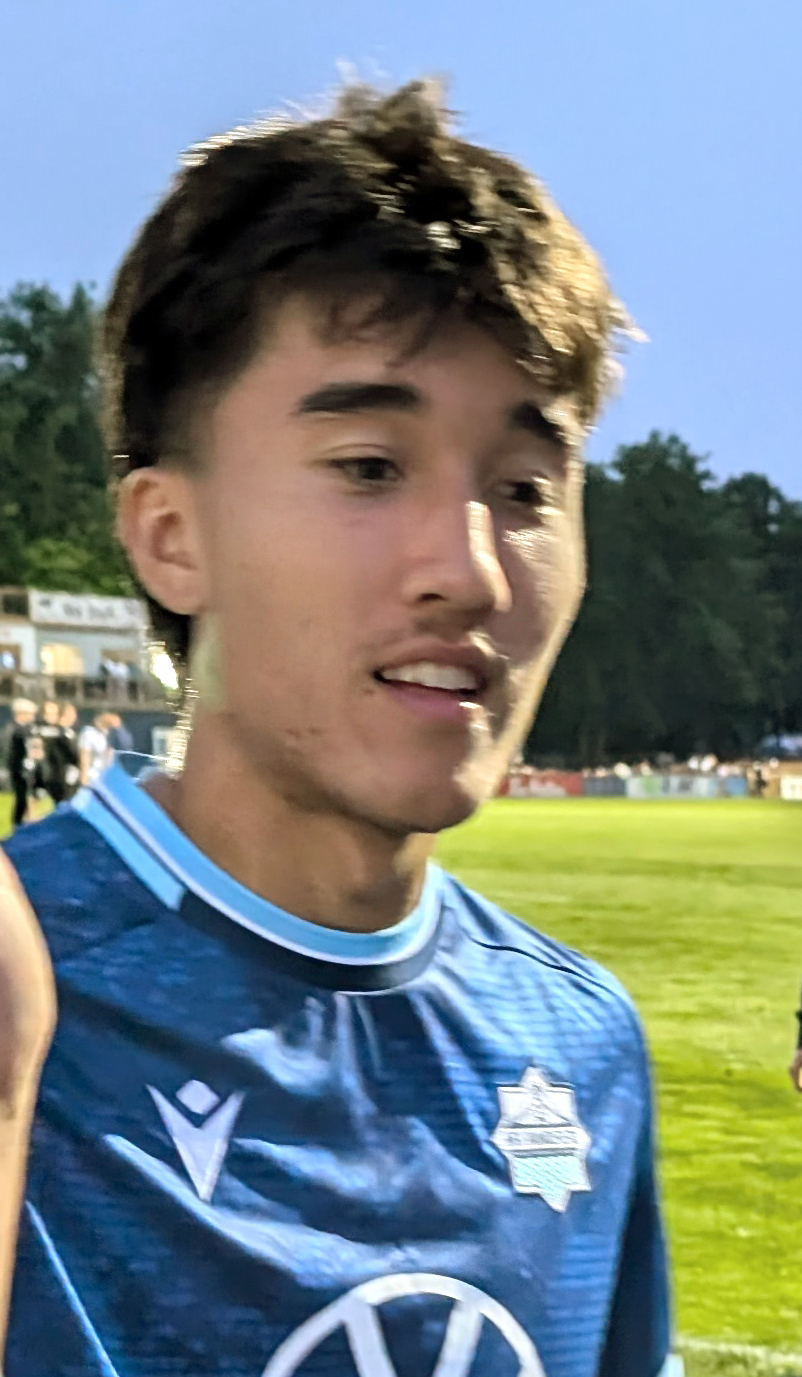
- Vasconcelos with the HFX Wanderers in 2024

Personal information
- Full name: Camilo Minh Vasconcelos
- Date of birth: March 19, 2005 (age 21)
- Place of birth: Cambridge, Ontario, Canada
- Height: 1.70 m (5 ft 7 in)
- Position: Midfielder

Team information
- Current team: Haiphong
- Number: 10

Youth career
- Cambridge United
- 2022–2023: Guelph United

Senior career*
Years	Team	Apps	(Gls)
2022–2023	Guelph United	21	(6)
2023	→ York United (loan)	0	(0)
2023–2025	HFX Wanderers	15	(0)
2026–	Haiphong	9	(0)
- * Club domestic league appearances and goals as of June 7, 2026

Camilo Minh Vasconcelos (born March 19, 2005) is a Canadian professional soccer player who play for V.League 1 club Haiphong.

== Early life ==
Vasconcelos was born in Canada to a father of Portuguese descent and a mother of Vietnamese descent. He attended high school St. Benedict CSS in Cambridge, Ontario, being named league MVP in June 2023. In 2023, he was set to begin attending the University of Vermont and play for the men's soccer team, however, some academic delays prevented him from joining the school.

== Club career ==
In 2022, Vasconcelos began playing in League1 Ontario with Guelph United, where he was named the team's U21 player of the year.

In June 2023, he joined Canadian Premier League club York United, on a short-term agreement, where he made the matchday squad three times in June and July, but did not make an appearance in a match. Later that summer, he went on trial with fellow CPL club the HFX Wanderers, including playing some friendly matches with their U23 side against German side Holstein Kiel U23. In September 2023, he signed a developmental contract with the Wanderers. He made his professional debut on October 6, 2023, coming on as a substitute against Valour FC. In February 2024, he signed a fully professional contract through the 2025 season with the club.

In February 2026, he signed with Vietnamese club Haiphong in the V.League 1.

== Career statistics ==
As of match played October 27, 2025

Club	Season	League			Playoffs		Domestic Cup		Continental		Total	
Club	Season	Division	Apps	Goals	Apps	Goals	Apps	Goals	Apps	Goals	Apps	Goals
Guelph United FC	2021	League1 Ontario	10	2	–		0	0	–		10	2
Guelph United FC	2022	League1 Ontario	11	4	0	0	–		–		11	4
Guelph United FC	Total		21	6	0	0	0	0	0	0	21	6
York United (loan)	2023	Canadian Premier League	0	0	0	0	0	0	–		0	0
HFX Wanderers	2023	Canadian Premier League	1	0	0	0	0	0	–		1	0
HFX Wanderers	2024	Canadian Premier League	12	0	–		0	0	–		12	0
HFX Wanderers	2025	Canadian Premier League	2	0	0	0	0	0	–		2	0
HFX Wanderers	Total		15	0	0	0	0	0	0	0	15	0
Career total			36	6	0	0	0	0	0	0	36	6
