= Tiago Coimbra =

Canadian soccer player (born 2004)

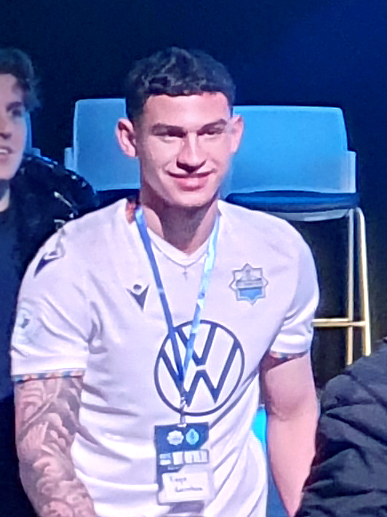
- Coimbra as a HFX Wanderers player in 2023

Personal information
- Full name: Tiago de Freitas Guimarães Coimbra
- Date of birth: 17 January 2004 (age 22)
- Place of birth: Fortaleza, Brazil
- Height: 1.88 m (6 ft 2 in)
- Position: Forward

Team information
- Current team: IFK Göteborg
- Number: 30

Youth career
- Escolinha do Flamengo
- Faly Academy
- 2020–2021: Juazeiro-CE
- 2021–2022: Palmeiras

Senior career*
Years	Team	Apps	(Gls)
2022	Palmeiras	0	(0)
2023–2025	HFX Wanderers	61	(19)
2026–	IFK Göteborg	7	(0)

International career^{‡}
2022	Canada U20	4	(1)
2026	Canada B	1	(0)
- * Club domestic league appearances and goals as of 16:22, 17 August 2026 (UTC) ‡ National team caps and goals as of January 17, 2026

Tiago de Freitas Guimarães Coimbra (born 17 January 2004), also known as Canadá, is a footballer who plays as a forward for Allsvenskan club IFK Göteborg. Born in Brazil, he represents Canada at youth international level.

== Early life ==
Coimbra began playing youth soccer at age three in Brazil with Escolinha do Flamengo. When he was nine years old, he moved to Orlando, Florida with his family, followed by a move to Vancouver, Canada, a couple of years later. In Canada, he played with Faly Academy for four years. In 2020, he returned to Brazil and joined Juazeiro. In June 2021, he joined the youth system of Palmeiras, where he played for their U17 and U20 squads. He departed the club in December 2022.

== Club career ==
In December 2022, he signed a two-year professional contract with a club option for 2025 with Canadian Premier League club HFX Wanderers beginning in the 2023 season. He scored his first goal on June 17, 2023 against Cavalry FC and was subsequently named to the CPL Team of the Week. In his first professional season, he made 20 league appearances for the side. A mid-season injury limited his playing time in the 2024 season, following a string of starts at the beginning of the season. In December 2024, he signed a two-year extension with the club, with options for 2027 and 2028. He also switched his jersey number from 19 to 9 for the 2025 season. In February 2025, he went on a training stint in England with West Ham United U21, while also spending some time training with the West Ham first team. On 1 July 2025, he scored a brace against Valour FC. On 22 August 2025, he scored the first hat trick in club history, in a 4-1 victory over Valour FC. At the end of the 2025 season, he won the league's Best Canadian U-21 Player Award. After the 2025 season, he went on a training stint with Major League Soccer club Houston Dynamo FC.

In January 2026, he transferred to Allsvenskan club IFK Göteborg, signing a contract through the summer of 2029, with HFX Wanderers receiving a club record transfer fee. On 21 February 2026, he made his debut in a Svenska Cupen match against Östersunds FK.

== International career ==
Born in Brazil, Coimbra spent his youth in Canada, and is a dual citizen, eligible for both national teams.

In April 2022, he was called up to the Canada U20 team for a pair of friendlies against Costa Rica U20. In June 2022, he was named to the squad for the 2022 CONCACAF U-20 Championship. He scored his first goal on 22 June against Saint Kitts and Nevis U20.

In January 2026, he was named to the Canada senior team for the first time, for a training camp and friendly against Guatemala. He appeared in the match against Guatamala, however, as it was designated a B-level friendly, it did not count as an official senior cap.

== Personal ==
While with Palmeiras, he was given the nickname Canadá, in reference to his dual nationality.

== Career statistics ==
As of August 17, 2026

Club	Season	League			Playoffs		Domestic Cup		Continental		Total	
Club	Season	Division	Apps	Goals	Apps	Goals	Apps	Goals	Apps	Goals	Apps	Goals
HFX Wanderers	2023	Canadian Premier League	19	3	1	0	1	0	0	0	21	3
HFX Wanderers	2024	Canadian Premier League	20	4	—		0	0	0	0	20	4
HFX Wanderers	2025	Canadian Premier League	22	12	1	1	0	0	0	0	23	13
HFX Wanderers	Total		61	19	2	1	1	0	0	0	64	20
IFK Göteborg	2026	Allsvenskan	7	0	—		3	0	2	0	12	0
Career total			68	19	2	1	4	0	2	0	75	20

== Honours ==
=== Individual ===
- CPL Best Under 21 Canadian Player of the Year: 2025
