= Bruno Figueiredo =

Portuguese footballer (born 1999)

Personal information
- Full name: Bruno Miguel Gomes Figueiredo
- Date of birth: July 9, 1999 (age 27)
- Place of birth: Almada, Portugal
- Height: 1.73 m (5 ft 8 in)
- Position: Midfielder

Team information
- Current team: Żabbar St. Patrick
- Number: 8

Youth career
- 2007–2011: Benfica
- 2011–2014: Vitória de Setúbal
- 2014–2015: Quinta do Conde
- 2015–2016: Almada
- 2016: Pinhalnovense
- 2016–2018: Fabril

Senior career*
Years	Team	Apps	(Gls)
2018–2019	Fabril	3	(0)
2019	Oriental Dragon FC	1	(0)
2019–2020	O Grandolense	10	(0)
2020–2021	Atlético Reguengos	8	(4)
2021–2022	Olímpico do Montijo	33	(9)
2022–2023	Oriental Dragon FC	24	(4)
2023–2024	Amora	12	(2)
2024	Covilhã	13	(1)
2024–2025	União de Santarém	15	(1)
2025	Valour FC	27	(2)
2026–	Żabbar St. Patrick	11	(1)
- * Club domestic league appearances and goals as of 18 May 2026

Bruno Miguel Gomes Figueiredo (born 9 July 1999) is a Portuguese professional footballer who plays as a midfielder for Maltese Premier League club Żabbar St. Patrick.

== Early life ==
Figueiredo was born in Almada, Portugal, before moving to island of São Miguel in the Azores, where his father was playing for Santa Clara until he was five, before moving back to continental Portugal. Figueiredo began playing youth football with Benfica, later joining the youth systems of Vitória de Setúbal, Quinta do Conde, Almada, Pinhalnovense, and Fabril.

== Career ==
Figueiredo began his senior career with Fabril in the fourth tier AF Setúbal 1ª Division. In 2019, he joined Oriental Dragon FC in the AF Setúbal 1ª Division. In late 2019, he moved to O Grandolense in the AF Setúbal 1ª Division. Later in 2020, he moved to Atlético Reguengos in the fourth tier AF Évora Divisão Elite. In August 2021, he joined Olímpico do Montijo in the AF Setúbal 1ª Division.

In 2022, he returned to Oriental Dragon FC in the new fourth tier Campeonato de Portugal. On 26 February 2023, he scored a brace in a 3-0 victory over Rabo de Peixe. On 19 March 2023, he scored another brace in a 2-1 victory over Ferreiras. In July 2023, he joined Amora in the third tier Liga 3. In late January 2024, he moved to Covilhã in Liga 3. In August 2024, he joined União de Santarém in Liga 3.

On 13 February 2025, he signed with Canadian Premier League club Valour FC on a one-year contract, with an option for 2026. He made his debut on April 5, 2025, against Pacific FC.

On 30 January 2026, he joined Maltese Premier League club Żabbar St. Patrick on a free transfer.

== Personal life ==
Figueiredo is the son of former Angola national team player Paulo Figueiredo.
