= Jefferson Alphonse =

Canadian soccer player (born 2003)

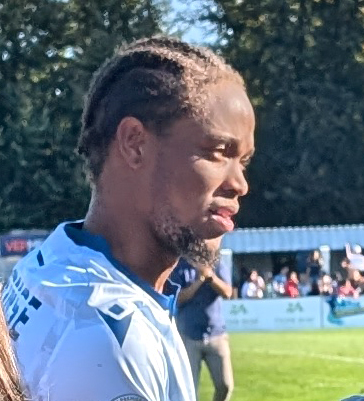
- Alphonse with HFX Wanderers FC in 2024

Personal information
- Full name: Jefferson Andrew Alphonse
- Date of birth: June 12, 2003 (age 23)
- Place of birth: Anjou, Quebec, Canada
- Height: 6 ft 1 in (1.85 m)
- Position: Defender

Team information
- Current team: HFX Wanderers FC
- Number: 21

Youth career
- FC Anjou
- CF Montréal

Senior career*
Years	Team	Apps	(Gls)
2022	CF Montréal U23	13	(0)
2023–2024	CS St-Laurent	9	(0)
2024–	HFX Wanderers	31	(0)

International career^{‡}
2022	Canada U20	3	(0)
- * Club domestic league appearances and goals as of October 27, 2025 ‡ National team caps and goals as of June 26, 2022

Jefferson Andrew Alphonse (born June 12, 2003) is a Canadian soccer player who plays for HFX Wanderers FC in the Canadian Premier League.

== Early life ==
Alphonse began playing youth soccer at age eight with FC Anjou. He later joined the CF Montréal Academy and was invited to attend pre-season with the first team ahead of the 2023 season.

== Club career ==
Alphonse began his senior career with CF Montréal U23 in the Première ligue de soccer du Québec. In 2023 and 2024, he played with CS St-Laurent. During 2023, he was invited to play with the HFX Wanderers U23 team for a couple of exhibition matches against German club Holstein Kiel U23. After playing with St-Laurent in the 2024 Canadian Championship, he went on trial with Cavalry FC of the Canadian Premier League for a week in June 2024, but did not sign as they had some issues with roster management.

In late June 2024, Alphonse signed a professional contract with the HFX Wanderers of the Canadian Premier League for the remainder of the 2024 CPL season with club options for 2025 and 2026. He made his debut on July 1, in a substitute appearance, against Cavalry FC. After the 2025 season, the club picked up his option for the 2026 season.

== International career ==
In April 2022, Alphonse was called up to the Canada U20 for the first time for a training camp, before later being named to the squad for the 2022 CONCACAF U-20 Championship.

== Career statistics ==
As of October 27, 2025

Appearances and goals by club, season and competition
Club	Season	League			Playoffs		Domestic cup		Total	
Club	Season	Division	Apps	Goals	Apps	Goals	Apps	Goals	Apps	Goals
CF Montréal U23	2022	Première ligue de soccer du Québec	13	0	—		—		13	0
CS St-Laurent	2023	Ligue1 Québec	5	0	—		—		5	0
CS St-Laurent	2024	Ligue1 Québec	4	0	—		3	0	7	0
CS St-Laurent	Total		9	0	0	0	3	0	12	0
HFX Wanderers	2024	Canadian Premier League	17	0	—		0	0	17	0
HFX Wanderers	2025	Canadian Premier League	14	0	1	0	0	0	15	0
HFX Wanderers	Total		31	0	1	0	3	0	32	0
Career total			53	0	1	0	3	0	57	0
