= Tavio Ciccarelli =

Canadian soccer player (born 2006)

- Tavio Ciccarelli (front) in 2026

Personal information
- Date of birth: July 24, 2006 (age 20)
- Place of birth: Winnipeg, Manitoba, Canada
- Height: 5 ft 8 in (1.73 m)
- Position: Forward

Team information
- Current team: HFX Wanderers
- Number: 20

Youth career
- 2014–2018: Bonivital SC
- Leeds United
- 2022–2024: Sheffield United

Senior career*
Years	Team	Apps	(Gls)
2024–	HFX Wanderers	15	(5)

International career^{‡}
2024–	Canada U20	6	(4)
- * Club domestic league appearances and goals as of May 30, 2026 ‡ National team caps and goals as of July 30, 2024

Tavio Ciccarelli (born July 24, 2006) is a Canadian soccer player who plays for HFX Wanderers in the Canadian Premier League.

== Early life ==
Ciccarelli player youth soccer in his native Winnipeg with Bonivital SC from 2014 to 2018. He also took part in the former Whitecaps Academy Manitoba Pre-Prospects Program. Afterwards, he went to England and played in the youth systems of Leeds United and Sheffield United.

== Club career ==
In May 2024, he signed with Canadian Premier League club HFX Wanderers on an Exceptional Young Talent contract through 2026, with the contract beginning in July, upon the opening of the transfer window. He made his professional debut on October 19 against York United. On April 12, 2026, he scored his first professional goal in a 2-2 draw with Inter Toronto FC.

== International career ==
In February 2024, Ciccarelli was named to the Canada U20 team for the 2024 CONCACAF U-20 Championship qualifying tournament. On February 23, 2024, he scored a hat trick in a 4–0 victory over Saint Vincent and the Grenadines U20. He was then subsequently called up to the squad for the official tournament in July.

== Career statistics ==
As of match played July 6, 2026

Club	Season	League			Playoffs		Domestic Cup		Continental		Total	
Club	Season	Division	Apps	Goals	Apps	Goals	Apps	Goals	Apps	Goals	Apps	Goals
HFX Wanderers FC	2024	Canadian Premier League	1	0	–		0	0	–		1	0
HFX Wanderers FC	2025	Canadian Premier League	3	0	0	0	0	0	–		3	0
HFX Wanderers FC	2026	Canadian Premier League	11	5	0	0	0	0	–		11	5
Career total			15	5	0	0	0	0	0	0	15	5
