= Wesley Timoteo =

Canadian soccer player (born 2000)

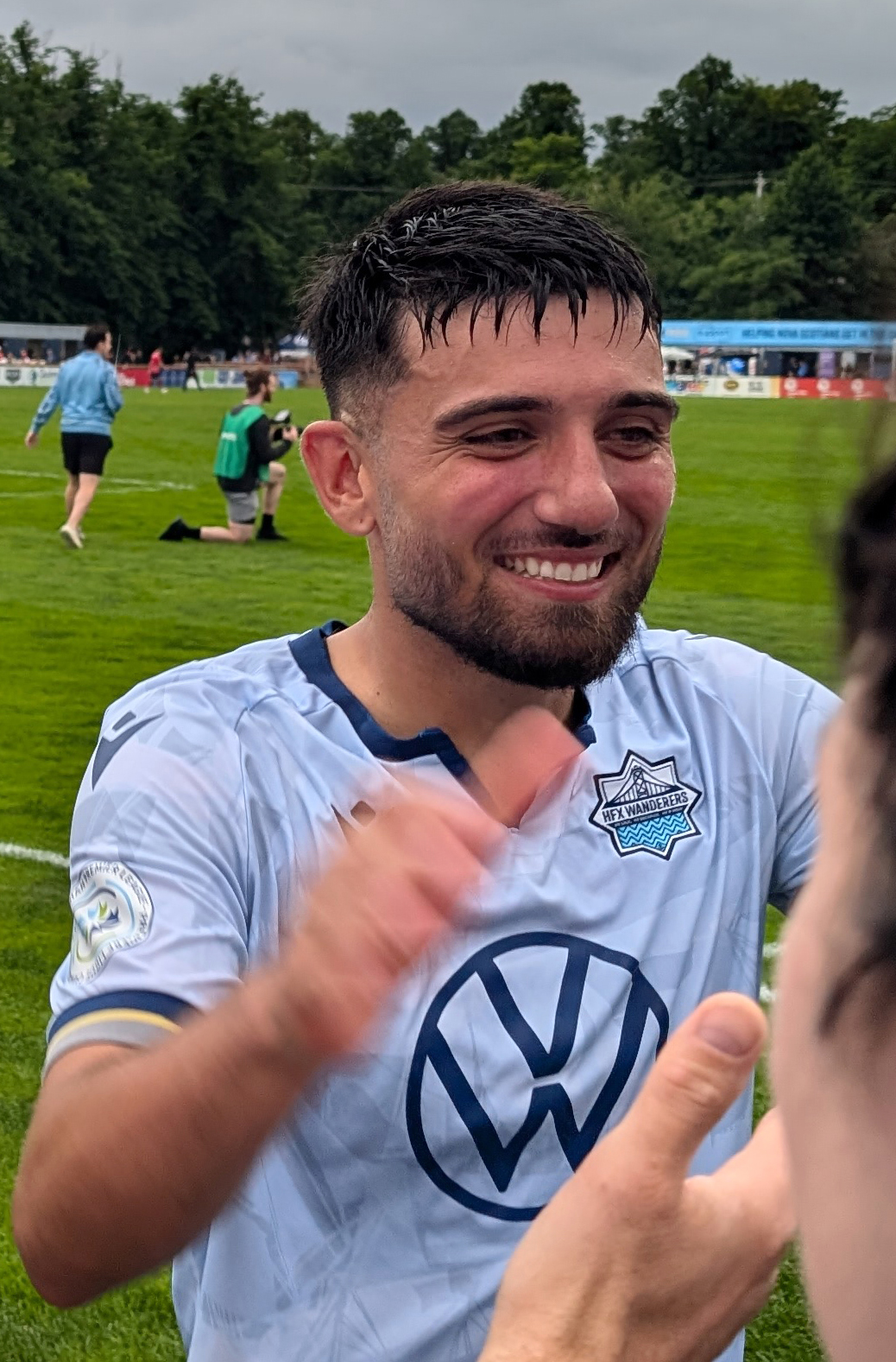
- Timoteo in 2024 with HFX Wanderers FC

Personal information
- Full name: Wesley-Thomas Lança Timóteo
- Date of birth: April 9, 2000 (age 26)
- Place of birth: Montreal, Quebec, Canada
- Height: 1.74 m (5 ft 9 in)
- Positions: Forward; fullback

Team information
- Current team: Atlético Ottawa

Youth career
- 2009–2014: SC Panellinios
- 2013–2014: Montreal Impact
- 2014–2015: Esperança de Lagos
- 2015–2018: Belenenses
- 2019–2020: Estoril Praia

Senior career*
Years	Team	Apps	(Gls)
2018	Belenenses	1	(0)
2019–2020	Estoril Praia B	19	(9)
2020–2021	PO Xylotymbou	20	(0)
2021–2022	Lusitânia	6	(1)
2022–2025	HFX Wanderers	72	(1)
2022	→ FC Edmonton (loan)	27	(3)
2026–	Atlético Ottawa	1	(0)
- * Club domestic league appearances and goals as of April 7, 2026

Wesley-Thomas Lança Timóteo (born April 9, 2000) is a Canadian professional soccer player who plays for Atlético Ottawa in the Canadian Premier League.

== Early life ==
Timoteo was born and raised in Montreal to parents of Portuguese descent. At the age of nine, he played youth soccer with SC Panellinios, while also being part of the École Sportive de Montréal Canada program. In 2013, he joined the Montreal Impact Academy.

At the age of fourteen, Timoteo headed to Europe and featured in the Swedish Gothia Cup tournament. From there, he moved to Portugal where he joined C.F. Esperança de Lagos, and later moved to Belenenses in June 2015. Prior to joining Belenenses, he had trials with the Sporting and Benfica academies, the latter of whom referred him to Belenenses. He later spent time in the academy of Estoril.

== Club career ==
In 2018, Timoteo made one appearance for Belenenses in the Portuguese fifth tier. during the 2019–20 season, he appeared for Estoril Praia B in the fifth tier.

In 2020, Timoteo signed with Cypriot First Division side PO Xylotymbou, making twenty league appearances and one appearance in the Cypriot Cup that season.

In 2021, he returned to Portugal with S.C. Lusitânia in the fifth tier Liga Meo Azores.

In March 2022, Timoteo trialed with Canadian Premier League club FC Edmonton. With Edmonton experiencing significant financial difficulties, Timoteo was signed by fellow CPL club HFX Wanderers and immediately loaned to the Edmonton. He scored his first professional goal on May 14 against Pacific FC. In the final game of the season on October 8, he scored the winning goal from a direct free kick in a 3–1 victory over Valour FC. In December 2022, HFX announced they had signed Timoteo to a new contract through 2024, with an option for 2025.

In March 2026, he signed with Atlético Ottawa in the Canadian Premier League for the 2026 season, with an option for 2027.

== International career ==
In 2012, he represented Canada at the 2012 Danone Nations Cup, an Under-12 tournament.

In February 2016, Timoteo participated in an evaluation camp for the Canadian U-17 national team.

== Career statistics ==
As of October 27, 2025

Club	Season	League			Playoffs		Cup		Continental		Total	
Club	Season	Division	Apps	Goals	Apps	Goals	Apps	Goals	Apps	Goals	Apps	Goals
Belenenses	2018–19	AF Lisboa 2ª Divisão	1	0	—		0	0	—		9	0
Estoril Praia B	2019–20	AF Lisboa 2ª Divisão	19	9	—		1 (Note: Appearances in the AF Lisboa Taça)	1	—		20	10
PO Xylotymbou	2020–21	Cypriot Second Division	20	0	—		1	0	—		21	0
S.C. Lusitânia	2021–22	Liga Meo Azores	6	1	—		0	0	—		6	1
HFX Wanderers	2022	Canadian Premier League	0	0	—		0	0	—		0	0
HFX Wanderers	2023	Canadian Premier League	24	0	1	0	1	0	—		26	0
HFX Wanderers	2024	Canadian Premier League	21	0	—		1	0	—		22	0
HFX Wanderers	2025	Canadian Premier League	27	1	1	0	1	0	—		29	1
HFX Wanderers	Total		72	1	2	0	3	0	0	0	77	1
FC Edmonton (loan)	2022	Canadian Premier League	27	3	—		1	0	—		28	3
Career total			145	13	2	0	6	1	0	0	153	15
