= Kareem Sow =

Canadian soccer player (born 2000)

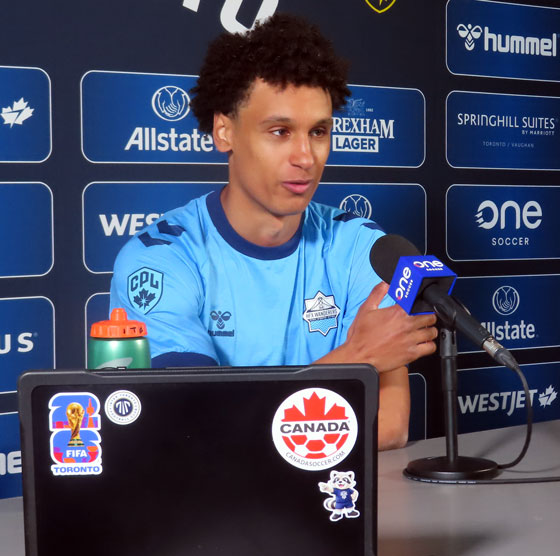
- Sow in 2026

Personal information
- Date of birth: September 28, 2000 (age 26)
- Place of birth: Fleurimont, Quebec, Canada
- Height: 1.86 m (6 ft 1 in)
- Position: Defender

Team information
- Current team: HFX Wanderers
- Number: 16

Youth career
- Ottawa Gloucester Hornets SC
- Montreal Impact

College career
Years	Team	Apps	(Gls)
2018–2023	Montreal Carabins		

Senior career*
Years	Team	Apps	(Gls)
2021–2022	HFX Wanderers	16	(0)
2024–	HFX Wanderers	33	(1)
- * Club domestic league appearances and goals as of May 17, 2026

Kareem Sow (born September 28, 2000) is a Canadian soccer player who plays as a defender for the HFX Wanderers in the Canadian Premier League.

== Early life ==
Sow played youth soccer with the Gloucester Hornets SC, before joining the Montreal Impact Academy at U13 level.

== University career ==
In 2018, Sow attended the University of Montreal playing for the Carabins soccer team where he was named to the first all-star team of the Quebec university network (RSEQ) in 2019. He won the national championship with the Carabins in 2021, while also being named to the RSEQ First Team All-Star, U SPORTS Second Team All-Star and Canadian Championship All-Star Team. In 2022, he was named an RSEQ First Team All-Star and a U Sports Second Team All-Star. In 2023, he was name RSEQ First Team All-Star and a U-Sports First Team All-Star and named to the U-Sports Championship All-Star Team. Over his time at university, he completed a degree in engineering.

== Club career ==
In the 2021 CPL-U Sports Draft, Sow was selected tenth overall by HFX Wanderers of the Canadian Premier League. In June 2021, he signed a developmental contract with HFX Wanderers for the 2021 season, allowing him to retain his university eligibility. On August 31, HFX announced Sow was returning to the Carabins and the University of Montreal. In 2022, he signed another developmental contract with the Wanderers. In August 2022, he once again returned to his university team, per the terms of his developmental contract.

In February 2024, he re-joined the Wanderers on a fully professional two-year contract, with an option for 2025, after having last played for the club in 2022. However, a series of injuries limited him to just one appearance in the 2024 season. After the 2025 season, the club picked up his option for the 2026 season. On April 11, 2026, he scored his first goal in a 2-2 draw against Inter Toronto FC.

== International career ==
In 2014, Sow attended a camp for the Canada U15 national team.

== Career statistics ==
As of October 19, 2024

Club	Season	League			Playoffs		Domestic Cup		Continental		Total	
Club	Season	Division	Apps	Goals	Apps	Goals	Apps	Goals	Apps	Goals	Apps	Goals
HFX Wanderers	2021	Canadian Premier League	11	0	—		0	0	—		11	0
HFX Wanderers	2022	Canadian Premier League	5	0	—		0	0	—		5	0
HFX Wanderers	2024	Canadian Premier League	1	0	—		0	0	—		1	0
HFX Wanderers	2025	Canadian Premier League	26	0	1	0	1	0	—		28	0
Career total			43	0	1	0	1	0	0	0	45	0
