= Nassim Mekidèche =

Canadian soccer player (born 2000)

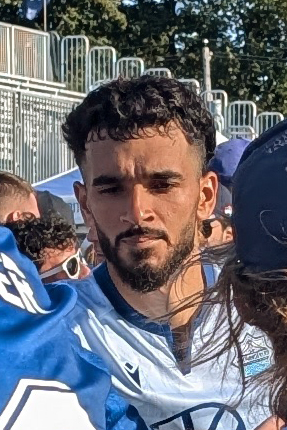
- Mekidèche with HFX Wanderers FC in 2024

Personal information
- Date of birth: April 30, 2000 (age 26)
- Place of birth: Laval, Québec, Canada
- Height: 1.88 m (6 ft 2 in)
- Position: Centre-back

Team information
- Current team: Olympique Akbou
- Number: 3

Youth career
- CS Fabrose
- CS Étoiles de L'Est
- 2018–2021: JS Kabylie

Senior career*
Years	Team	Apps	(Gls)
2018–2021	JS Kabylie	5	(0)
2021–2022	CS Hammam-Lif	4	(0)
2022	Valour FC	10	(0)
2023	Sporting Kansas City II	20	(2)
2024	US Monastir	0	(0)
2024–2025	HFX Wanderers	16	(3)
2026–	Olympique Akbou	6	(0)
- * Club domestic league appearances and goals as of 6 June 2026

Nassim Mekidèche (Arabic: نسيم مقيدش; born April 3, 2000) is a Canadian soccer player who plays for Olympique Akbou in the Algerian Ligue Professionnelle 1.

== Early life ==
Born in Laval, Quebec to parents of Algerian descent, Mekidèche played youth soccer with CS Fabrose and CS Étoiles de L'Est. He represented Quebec at the 2017 Canada Summer Games.

== Club career ==
In May 2018, Mekidèche signed a three-year contract with Algerian club JS Kabylie, initially joining the youth side, with the plan to train regularly with the first team. On November 23, 2018, he made his professional debut, coming on at halftime in a league match against CA Bordj Bou Arreridj. After making minimal appearances for JSK, the club was still interested in extending his contract, which he did signing for an additional two years in August 2020. In February 2021, he underwent surgery on his meniscus, leaving him out for the remainder of the season.

In September 2021, he joined Tunisian club CS Hammam-Lif in the Tunisian Ligue Professionnelle 1. After only making four appearances, he departed the club.

In July 2022, he joined Valour FC of the Canadian Premier League, despite interest from Algerian clubs CR Belouizdad and ES Sétif. He made ten appearances with the club, before departing at the end of the season.

After the expiry of his contract with Valour, he was invited to trial with Major League Soccer club Sporting Kansas City during their 2023 pre-season. In January 2023, he signed a contract with the second team, Sporting Kansas City II, in MLS Next Pro. He scored on his debut on March 26 against Colorado Rapids 2.

In January 2024, he signed with US Monastir in the Tunisian Ligue Professionnelle 1. Three months later, he was released by the club.

On September 13, 2024, he signed with the HFX Wanderers of the Canadian Premier League through the 2025 season, with an option for 2026. He made his debut the next day, starting against Forge FC. During the 2025 season, he struggled with injuries, after suffering an injury during pre-season and then re-aggravating it upon his initial return.

On 31 December 2025, Mekidèche joined Algerian club Olympique Akbou.

== Career statistics ==
As of match played October 27, 2025

Club	Season	League			Playoffs		National Cup		Continental		Other		Total	
Club	Season	Division	Apps	Goals	Apps	Goals	Apps	Goals	Apps	Goals	Apps	Goals	Apps	Goals
JS Kabylie	2018–19	Algerian Ligue Professionnelle 1	1	0	—		0	0	—		—		1	0
JS Kabylie	2019–20	Algerian Ligue Professionnelle 1	2	0	—		0	0	0	0	—		2	0
JS Kabylie	2020–21	Algerian Ligue Professionnelle 1	2	0	—		—		0	0	0	0	2	0
JS Kabylie	Total		5	0	0	0	0	0	0	0	0	0	5	0
CS Hammam-Lif	2021–22	Tunisian Ligue Professionnelle 1	4	0	—		0	0	—		—		4	0
Valour FC	2022	Canadian Premier League	10	0	—		0	0	—		—		10	0
Sporting Kansas City II	2023	MLS Next Pro	20	2	1	0	—		—		—		21	2
HFX Wanderers	2024	Canadian Premier League	7	2	—		0	0	—		—		7	2
HFX Wanderers	2025	Canadian Premier League	9	1	1	0	0	0	—		—		10	1
HFX Wanderers	Total		16	3	1	0	0	0	0	0	0	0	17	3
Career total			55	5	2	0	0	0	0	0	0	0	57	5
