= Pedro Machado =

Portuguese footballer

Personal information
- Full name: Pedro Miguel Ruas Machado
- Date of birth: 22 June 1996 (age 30)
- Place of birth: Amadora, Portugal
- Height: 1.91 m (6 ft 3 in)
- Position: Centre-back

Team information
- Current team: Al-Tadamon

Youth career
- 2006–2012: Quarteirense
- 2012–2015: Louletano

Senior career*
Years	Team	Apps	(Gls)
2014–2015	Louletano	13	(0)
2015–2016	Mirandela	12	(0)
2016–2017	Sertanense	20	(1)
2017	Olhanense	0	(0)
2017–2018	Louletano	18	(0)
2018–2019	Belenenses SAD	0	(0)
2019–2020	Casa Pia	24	(1)
2020–2021	Oliveirense	27	(1)
2021–2022	FC U Craiova	2	(0)
2022–2023	Torreense	15	(1)
2023	Vitória de Setúbal	15	(1)
2024	IFK Mariehamn	24	(0)
2025	Pacific FC	12	(0)
2025–	Al-Tadamon	0	(0)
- * Club domestic league appearances and goals as of 23 July 2025

Pedro Miguel Ruas Machado (born 22 June 1996) is a Portuguese professional footballer who plays as a centre-back for Al-Tadamon in the Kuwait Premier League.

== Career ==
He made his Taça da Liga debut for Casa Pia on 28 July 2019 in a game against Vilafranquense.

On 18 June 2021, Machado joined Romanian Liga I club FC U Craiova.

On 18 January 2024, Machado signed a one-year contract with Finnish Veikkausliiga club IFK Mariehamn.

On 11 February 2025, he signed with Pacific FC in Canadian Premier League. In July 2025, he agreed to a mutual termination of the remainder of his contract.

In August 2025, Machado joined Kuwait Premier League club Al-Tadamon.

== Career statistics ==
As of 23 July 2025

Appearances and goals by club, season and competition
Club	Season	League			Cup (Note: Includes Taça de Portugal and Suomen Cup)		Other		Total	
Club	Season	Division	Apps	Goals	Apps	Goals	Apps	Goals	Apps	Goals
Louletano	2014–15	Campeonato Nacional de Seniores	13	0	–		–		13	0
Mirandela	2015–16	Campeonato de Portugal	12	0	–		–		12	0
Sertanense	2016–17	Campeonato de Portugal	20	1	–		–		20	1
Louletano	2017–18	Campeonato de Portugal	18	0	–		–		18	0
Casa Pia	2018–19	Campeonato de Portugal	6	0	–		–		6	0
Casa Pia	2019–20	LigaPro	18	0	0	0	5 (Note: Includes Taça da Liga)	0	23	0
Casa Pia	Total		24	0	0	0	5	0	29	0
Oliveirense	2020–21	Liga Portugal 2	27	1	–		–		27	1
FC U Craiova	2021–22	Liga I	2	0	–		–		2	0
Torreense	2021–22	Liga 3	13	1	0	0	–		13	1
Torreense	2022–23	Liga Portugal 2	2	0	1	0	0	0	3	0
Torreense	Total		15	1	1	0	0	0	16	1
Vitória de Setúbal	2022–23	Liga 3	13	1	1	0	–		14	1
IFK Mariehamn	2024	Veikkausliiga	24	0	2	0	5 (Note: Includes Finnish League Cup)	0	31	0
Pacific FC	2025	Canadian Premier League	12	0	1	0	0	0	13	0
Career total			180	4	5	0	10	0	195	4
