= Xavier Venâncio =

Portuguese footballer

Personal information
- Full name: Xavier Catarino Venâncio
- Date of birth: 29 May 1999 (age 27)
- Place of birth: Mafra, Portugal
- Height: 1.76 m (5 ft 9 1/2 in)
- Positions: Midfielder; defender

Team information
- Current team: Valour FC
- Number: 20

Youth career
- 2008–2011: Foot 21
- 2011–2013: CR Foot
- 2013–2017: Real
- 2017–2018: Belenenses
- 2019–2020: Académica de Coimbra

Senior career*
Years	Team	Apps	(Gls)
2018–2019	Rieti	23	(0)
2020–2022	Académica de Coimbra	0	(0)
2021–2022	→ Olhanense (loan)	23	(6)
2023	Sintrense	11	(2)
2023–2024	Louletano	2	(0)
2024	Chieri	17	(1)
2025	Valour FC	24	(1)
- * Club domestic league appearances and goals as of 27 October 2025

Xavier Catarino Venâncio (born 29 May 1999) is a Portuguese professional footballer who plays as a midfielder.

== Club career ==
On 18 September 2018, Venâncio made his professional debut with Rieti in a 2018–19 Serie C match against Matera.

On 4 February 2025, Venâncio signed a one-year contract with a club option for an additional year with Canadian Premier League club Valour FC. He made his debut on April 5, 2025, against Pacific FC.
