= Zachary Fernandez =

Canadian soccer player (born 2001)

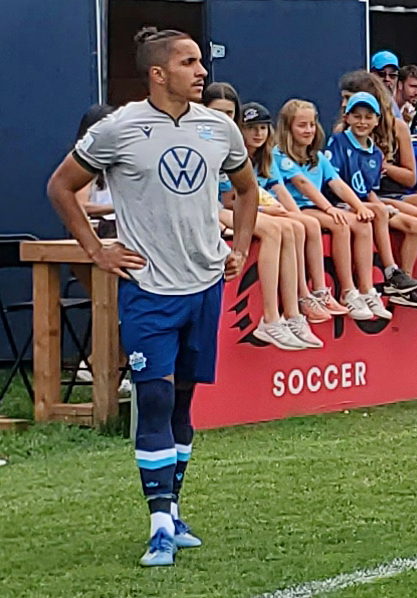
- Fernandez with HFX Wanderers FC

Personal information
- Full name: Zachary Tognon Fernandez
- Date of birth: September 24, 2001 (age 25)
- Place of birth: Laval, Quebec, Canada
- Height: 1.78 m (5 ft 10 in)
- Position: Right-back

Team information
- Current team: FC Supra du Québec

Youth career
- –2021: CF Montréal

Senior career*
Years	Team	Apps	(Gls)
2021	AS Blainville	15	(3)
2022–2024	HFX Wanderers	72	(5)
2025	Valour FC	14	(1)
2026–	FC Supra du Québec	0	(0)
- * Club domestic league appearances and goals as of June 5, 2026

Zachary Tognon Fernandez (born September 24, 2001) is a Canadian professional soccer player who plays as a right-back for FC Supra du Québec in the Canadian Premier League.

== Early life ==
In his youth, Fernandez played with the CF Montréal Academy. He attended training camp with the CF Montréal first team in 2020 and 2021. In 2021, he chose to depart the CF Montreal system to pursue other playing opportunities.

== Club career ==
In 2021, Fernandez joined Première ligue de soccer du Québec side AS Blainville and played in their 2021 Canadian Championship match against Canadian Premier League club HFX Wanderers FC.

In January 2022, Fernandez signed his first professional contract with Canadian Premier League side HFX Wanderers FC. He made his debut on April 7, 2022, in HFX's season opener against York United. In his rookie season, he led the team in assists with five. In December 2022, he signed an extension with the Wanderers, guaranteeing his contract through 2024. On April 15, 2023, Fernandez scored his first professional goal, as well as the first goal of the 2023 CPL season, netting the opener in a 1–1 draw against Atlético Ottawa. During the 2023 season, he scored 3 goals and added two assists.

In February 2025, Fernandez signed with Valour FC on a one-year contract, with an option for 2026. He made his debut for the club on April 19, 2025 against Forge FC. In August 2025, he suffered an ACL injury, causing him to miss the remainder of the season.

In June 2026, he signed with FC Supra du Québec in the Canadian Premier League for the remainder of the 2026 season, with an option for 2027.

== International career ==
Fernandez made his debut in the Canadian youth program at a Canada U14 identification camp in December 2015.

== Career statistics ==
As of October 19, 2024

Club statistics
Club	Season	League			Playoffs		National Cup (Note: Includes appearances in the Canadian Championship.)		Total	
Club	Season	Division	Apps	Goals	Apps	Goals	Apps	Goals	Apps	Goals
AS Blainville	2021	Première Ligue de soccer du Québec	15	3	—		1	0	16	3
HFX Wanderers	2022	Canadian Premier League	24	0	—		2	0	26	0
HFX Wanderers	2023	Canadian Premier League	23	3	1	0	1	0	25	3
HFX Wanderers	2024	Canadian Premier League	25	2	—		1	0	26	2
HFX Wanderers	Total		72	5	1	0	4	0	77	5
Valour FC	2025	Canadian Premier League	14	1	—		2	0	16	1
Career total			101	9	1	0	7	0	109	8
