= Jason Bahamboula =

French-Congolese footballer (born 2001)

- Bahamboula in 2026 with HFX Wanderers FC

Personal information
- Date of birth: 15 June 2001 (age 25)
- Place of birth: Caen, France
- Height: 1.78 m (5 ft 10 in)
- Position: Winger

Team information
- Current team: HFX Wanderers
- Number: 14

Youth career
- –2018: Caen

Senior career*
Years	Team	Apps	(Gls)
2018–2020	Caen II	1	(0)
2020–2023	Vitória Guimarães B	54	(6)
2022–2023	Vitória Guimarães	1	(0)
2024	Valmiera	29	(5)
2025–	HFX Wanderers	22	(3)

International career^{‡}
2024–	Congo	2	(0)
- * Club domestic league appearances and goals as of 27 October 2025 ‡ National team caps and goals as of 1 November 2024

Jason Bahamboula (born 15 June 2001) is a professional footballer who plays as a winger for Canadian Premier League club HFX Wanderers. Born in France, he plays for the Congo national team.

== Club career ==
Bahamboula is a youth product of the French club Caen, and moved to Vitória Guimarães in January 2020 where he was originally assigned to their reserves. He made his professional and Primeira Liga debut with Vitória Guimarães as a late substitute in a 1–0 loss to Casa Pia.

In the summer of 2023, Bahamboula's contract with Vitória expired and he left the club.

On 23 January 2024, Bahamboula joined Latvian Higher League club Valmiera.

Bahamboula signed with Canadian Premier League club HFX Wanderers on 29 January 2025 on a contract through the 2026 season, with a club option for 2027.

== International career ==
Born in Caen, France, Bahamboula is of Congo-Brazzaville descent. He was called up to the Congo national team in March 2024.

== Personal life ==
Jason is the cousin of footballers Yven Moyo and Plaisir, Dolan and Dylan Bahamboula.
