= Juan Quintana (footballer, born 2003) =

Colombian footballer (born 2003)

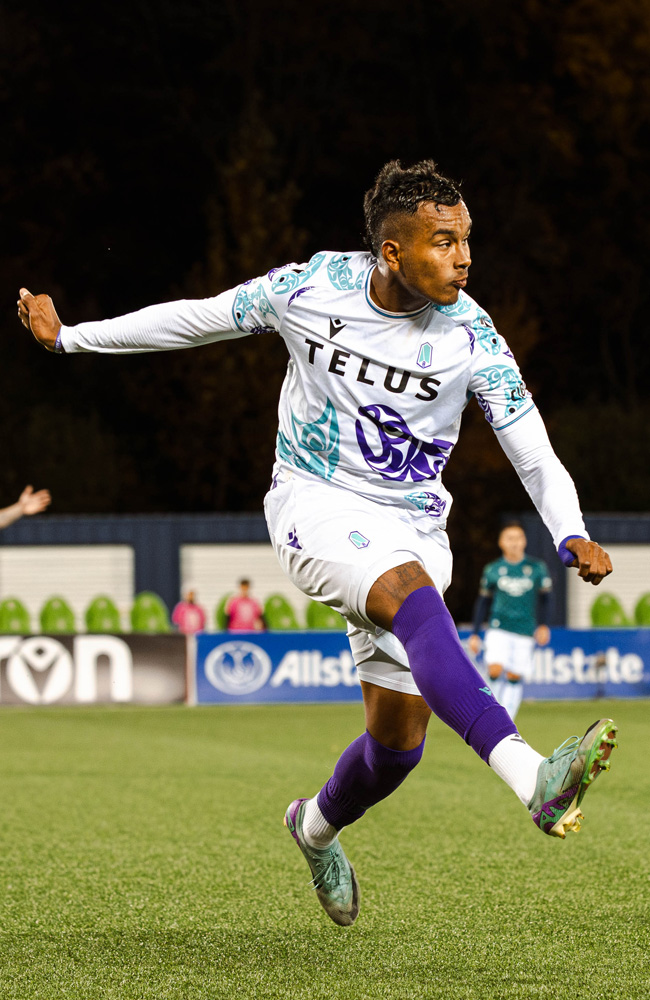

Personal information
- Full name: Juan David Quintana Echeverry
- Date of birth: 10 November 2003 (age 23)
- Place of birth: Palmira, Valle del Cauca, Colombia
- Height: 6 ft 0 in (1.83 m)
- Position: Defender

Team information
- Current team: Pacific FC
- Number: 5

Youth career
- SD Envigado Palmira
- Orsomarso

Senior career*
Years	Team	Apps	(Gls)
2022–2023	Orsomarso	37	(1)
2024–	Pacific FC	35	(0)
2026	→ TSS FC Rovers (loan)	1	(0)
- * Club domestic league appearances and goals as of October 24, 2026

Juan David Quintana Echeverry (born 10 November 2003) is a Colombian footballer who plays for Pacific FC in the Canadian Premier League.

== Early life ==
Quintana began playing youth football with SD Envigado Palmira.

== Club career ==
Quintana began playing at the senior level with Orsomarso in the Colombian Categoría Primera B in 2022.

In April 2024, he signed a one-year contract with Pacific FC of the Canadian Premier League, with club options for 2025 and 2026. In June 2024, he was named to the CPL Team of the Week for Week 8. At the end of the 2024 season, the club picked up his option for the 2025 season. In May 2025, he suffered an ACL injury causing him to miss the remainder of the season.

== International career ==
In May 2022, Quintana was called up to the Colombia U20 for a preparation camp ahead of the 2022 Maurice Revello Tournament, although, he was ultimately not named to the final squad.

== Career statistics ==
As of 6 May 2025

Club	Season	League			Playoffs		Domestic cup		Continental		Total	
Club	Season	Division	Apps	Goals	Apps	Goals	Apps	Goals	Apps	Goals	Apps	Goals
Orsomarso	2022	Categoría Primera B	21	0	—		1	0	—		22	0
Orsomarso	2023	Categoría Primera B	16	1	—		4	0	—		20	1
Orsomarso	Total		37	1	0	0	5	0	0	0	42	1
Pacific FC	2024	Canadian Premier League	16	0	1	0	5	0	—		22	0
Pacific FC	2025	Canadian Premier League	4	0	–		1	0	—		5	0
Pacific FC	Total		20	0	1	0	6	0	0	0	27	0
Career total			57	1	1	0	11	0	0	0	69	1
