= Patrice Gheisar =

Canadian soccer coach (born 1975)

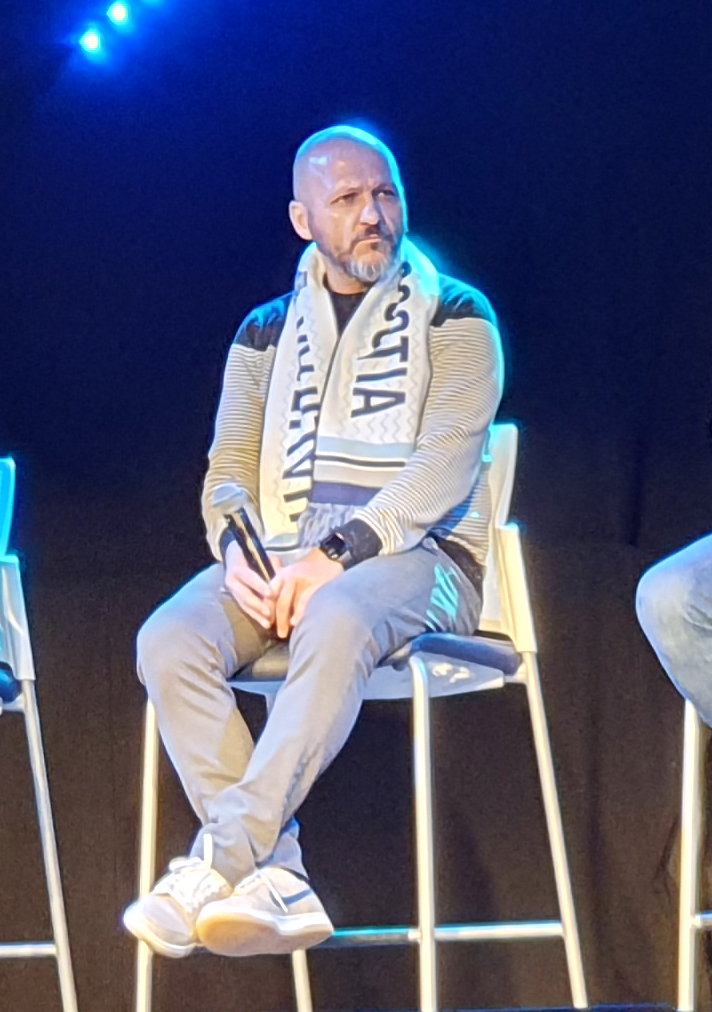
- Gheisar in 2023

Personal information
- Date of birth: June 15, 1975 (age 51)
- Place of birth: Etobicoke, Ontario, Canada

Team information
- Current team: Scrosoppi FC

College career
Years	Team	Apps	(Gls)
1998–2002	York Lions		

Senior career*
Years	Team	Apps	(Gls)
1998	York Region Shooters		

Managerial career
- 2010–2012: York University Lions (assistant)
- 2010–2011: SC Toronto (assistant)
- 2012: SC Toronto
- Ryerson University Rams (assistant)
- 2014–2018: Vaughan Azzurri (assistant)
- 2019–2022: Seneca College Sting
- 2019–2022: Vaughan Azzurri
- 2022–2025: HFX Wanderers FC
- 2026–: Scrosoppi FC
- * Club domestic league appearances and goals

Patrice Gheisar (born June 15, 1975) is a Canadian soccer coach who currently serves as the head coach of Scrosoppi FC in League1 Ontario.

== Playing career ==
Gheisar attended York University and played for the men's soccer team for five seasons.

He later played for the York Region Shooters in the Canadian Professional Soccer League.

== Coaching career ==
Gheisar began coaching with youth soccer club North York Hearts-Azzurri SC in 2005. Afterwards, he joined Vaughan Azzurri as a youth soccer coach where he remained in various roles for 16 years until 2022.

He also served as an assistant coach with Portugal FC/SC Toronto in the Canadian Soccer League under Carmine Isacco. In 2011, he was nominated for the Coach of the Year award while managing SC Toronto's reserve team in the CSL's second division. In 2012, he was named head coach of the first team, after Iascco moved to the role of Technical Director.

At the university level, he served as an assistant coach with the Ryerson Rams and York Lions.

In December 2018, he was announced as the head coach of the Seneca College's men's soccer team at the college level. With Seneca, Gheisar was named OCAA coach of the year in 2019.

He also served as coached Vaughan Azzurri in League1 Ontario, under Carmine Isacco (who he also worked with at SC Toronto and with the York Lions). In 2019, he was named head coach of the League1 Ontario side, taking over from Isacco. In 2019, Vaughan participated in the 2019 Canadian Championship, defeating professional club HFX Wanderers FC 1-0 on the road in the second leg, but were eliminated on away goals in the two-legged tie. In 2021, he was named East Division Coach of the Year, and the following season was named the overall league Coach of the Year.

On November 30, 2022, he was named head coach of HFX Wanderers FC of the Canadian Premier League. At the time of his hiring, Wanderers president Derek Martin emphasized Gheiser's history of developing strong attacking teams and his recruitment ability as prime reasons for his hiring. He won his first professional match on June 10 in a 2-0 victory over Valour FC and was named the CPL Manager of the Month for June. After his first season, he extended his contract with the club through 2025. In November 2024, he was invited to join the Canada men's team to assist with their training camp as part of Canada's Community Coaching program. After the 2025 season, he parted ways with the club, upon the conclusion of his contract.

In January 2026, he joined Scrosoppi FC as their Director of Football Operations and head coach of the men’s first team in League1 Ontario.

== Coaching statistics ==
The following statistics are for club teams only (playoff and cup matches are included).

As of October 27, 2025

Coaching record by team and tenure
Team	Nat.	League	From	To	Record							
Team	Nat.	League	From	To	G	W	D	L	GF	GA	GD	Win %
SC Toronto	CAN	Canadian Soccer League	2012		23	14	4	5	51	17	+34	60.87
Vaughan Azzurri	CAN	League1 Ontario	2019	2022	53	43	6	4	173	59	+114	81.13
HFX Wanderers	CAN	Canadian Premier League	2023	2025	89	29	26	34	123	120	+3	32.58
Total					165	86	36	43	347	196	+151	52.12
