= 2024 Canadian Premier League final =

Soccer match

- Event: 2024 Canadian Premier League season
Cavalry FC	Forge FC
2	1
- Date: November 9, 2024
- Venue: ATCO Field, Foothills County, Alberta
- CPL Finals MVP: Tobias Warschewski
- Referee: Renzo Villanueva
- Attendance: 7,052
- Weather: Cloudy; 4 °C (39 °F); 65% humidity

The 2024 Canadian Premier League final was the sixth edition of the CPL Finals, the post-season championship of the Canadian Premier League, the top level of Canadian soccer, which determined the winner of the 2024 Canadian Premier League season. It was played on November 9, 2024 at ATCO Field in Foothills County, Alberta between Cavalry FC and Forge FC. The 2024 final was a rematch of the 2023 final which was hosted and won by Forge FC.

Cavalry defeated Forge 2–1 to win their first CPL title. Tobias Warschewski and Sergio Camargo scored first half goals to give Cavalry a 2–0 half-time lead; Alexander Achinioti-Jönsson responded for Forge in the second half. Following the match, Warschewski was named the inaugural CPL Final MVP. Cavalry was awarded the North Star Cup as CPL champion and earned a spot in the 2025 CONCACAF Champions Cup.

== Path to the final ==
The 2024 CPL season was contested by eight teams. Each team played four games against each of the seven opponents for a total of 28 matches. The top-five teams from the regular season qualified for the playoffs which begin on October 23. The playoffs featured a Page playoff format where teams entered in different rounds depending on their finishing position. All matches in the playoffs were played as single legs. The finals were contested by the winner of the playoffs' first semifinal and the winner of the second semifinal.

=== Regular season standings ===
Pos	Team	Pld	W	D	L	GF	GA	GD	Pts	Playoff qualification
1	Forge (S)	28	15	5	8	45	31	+14	50	First semifinal
2	Cavalry (C)	28	12	12	4	39	27	+12	48	First semifinal
3	Atlético Ottawa	28	11	11	6	42	31	+11	44	Quarterfinal
4	York United	28	11	6	11	35	36	−1	39	Play-in round
5	Pacific	28	9	7	12	27	32	−5	34	Play-in round

Source: CanPL
Rules for classification: 1) Points; 2) Total number of wins; 3) Head-to-head; 4) Goal differential; 5) Goals for; 6) Away goals differential; 7) Away goals for; 8) Home goals differential; 9) Home goals for; 10) Fewest disciplinary points; 11) Most under-21 domestic player minutes; 12) Drawing of lots.
(C) Champion (qualified to Champions Cup Round one); (S) CPL Shield winner (qualified to Champions Cup Round one)

=== Playoff bracket ===
Play-in round
October 23
4	York United	2
5	Pacific FC	0

First semifinal
October 27
1	Forge FC	0
2	Cavalry FC	1
Quarterfinal
October 27
3	Atlético Ottawa (p)	2 (5)
4	York United	2 (4)

Second semifinal
November 2
1	Forge FC	1
3	Atlético Ottawa	0

Final
November 9
2	Cavalry FC	2
1	Forge FC	1

== Background ==
=== Cavalry FC ===
Cavalry reached the CPL final for the third time in six seasons and the second time in a row.

=== Forge FC ===
Forge qualified for the CPL playoffs on September 21 and clinched first place and the top seed in the playoffs on October 6.

Following a 1–0 win against Atlético Ottawa on November 2, Forge FC qualified for a record-extending sixth consecutive CPL final. Forge attempted to win their fifth CPL championship and tried to become the first CPL team to win the double by winning the CPL Shield and the North Star Cup in the same season.

=== Head-to-head ===
The 2024 CPL final was the sixth meeting of the season between these two teams and the twenty-sixth overall. Forge had the advantage in the 2024 regular season against Cavalry, leading the head-to-head with two wins, one draw, and one loss and finishing two points ahead in the standings. This was the second consecutive CPL final between Cavalry and Forge and the third overall. The previous occurrences in 2019 and 2023 were both won by Forge FC.

As the top-two teams in regular season, Forge hosted Cavalry in the first semifinal which was a non-elimination game. Cavalry won the game and earned the right to host the CPL final while Forge qualified to the second semifinal as losers. The match was the 29th of 31 games between the teams that was decided by one goal or fewer.

== Venue ==
ATCO Field in Foothills County, Alberta, home of Cavalry FC, was the host stadium for the final. This was determined by the outcome of the playoffs' first semifinal on October 27 between regular season winner Forge FC and second seed Cavalry FC; Cavalry won the match 1–0. ATCO Field has previously hosted the second leg of the 2019 Canadian Premier League finals.

== Broadcasting ==
The CPL final continued to be broadcast on OneSoccer. On October 9, the CPL and CBC jointly announced that the CBC would also broadcast the final for the first time since 2020 on its platforms CBC TV, CBC Gem, and cbcsports.ca.

== Pre-match ==
As part of its broadcasting announcement, the CPL announced that the final would be played on November 9 at 3:00 pm ET. The CPL confirmed the date and time following Cavalry's win in the first semifinal.

Associated with the final, the annual Canadian Premier League Awards took place on November 7 in Calgary. Matchday featured a "FanFest" headlined by singer Lu Kala.

== Match ==
November 9
1:00 pm MST (UTC−7)

Cavalry FC	2–1	Forge FC
Warschewski 32' (pen.); Camargo 38'	Report	Achinioti-Jönsson 52'

ATCO Field, Foothills County
Attendance: 7,052
Referee: Renzo Villanueva

Cavalry	Forge

GK	1	(Canada) Marco Carducci (c)
RB	33	(Canada) Fraser Aird		(substituted off) 82'
CB	4	(Netherlands) Daan Klomp	(yellow card) 90+4'
CB	3	(Canada) Callum Montgomery
LB	5	(France) Bradley Kamdem
CM	26	(Canada) Shamit Shome
CM	27	(Canada) Diego Gutiérrez	(yellow card) 51'
RW	7	(Somalia) Ali Musse
AM	10	(Canada) Sergio Camargo		(substituted off) 58'
LW	11	(New Zealand) Jay Herdman		(substituted off) 71'
CF	9	(Germany) Tobias Warschewski	(yellow card) 40'	(substituted off) 82'
Substitutes:
GK	31	(Canada) Joseph Holliday
MF	6	(Canada) Charlie Trafford		(substituted on) 71'
DF	12	(Republic of Ireland) Tom Field
FW	14	(Trinidad and Tobago) Malcolm Shaw	(yellow card) 74'	(substituted on) 58'
FW	17	(Germany) Nicolas Wähling
MF	24	(Canada) Eryk Kobza		(substituted on) 82'
FW	80	(Canada) Lowell Wright		(substituted on) 82'
Manager: (England) Tommy Wheeldon Jr.

GK	16	(Czech Republic) Jassem Koleilat
RB	2	(Canada) Malcolm Duncan		(substituted off) 81'
CB	13	(Sweden) Alexander Achinioti-Jönsson
CB	4	(Canada) Dominic Samuel
LB	81	(England) Malik Owolabi-Belewu
CM	10	(Canada) Kyle Bekker (c)
CM	21	(Canada) Alessandro Hojabrpour
RM	7	(Canada) David Choinière
AM	22	(Canada) Noah Jensen		(substituted off) 69'
LM	11	(Ghana) Nana Ampomah		(substituted off) 30'
CF	39	(Belgium) Béni Badibanga	(yellow card) 47'
Substitutes:
GK	29	(Canada) Christopher Kalongo
FW	9	(Canada) Jordan Hamilton
FW	14	(Canada) Terran Campbell		(substituted on) 81'
DF	17	(Mexico) Daniel Parra		(substituted on) 69'
FW	19	(Canada) Tristan Borges	(yellow card) 88'	(substituted on) 30'
MF	26	(Cuba) Orlendis Benítez
MF	64	(Canada) Khadim Kane
Manager: (Canada) Bobby Smyrniotis

CPL Final MVP:
Tobias Warschewski (Cavalry FC)

Assistant referees:
Marie-Han Gagnon-Chretien
Graham Forsyth
Fourth official:
Yusri Rudolf

Match rules

- 90 minutes
- 30 minutes of extra time if necessary
- Penalty shoot-out if score still level
- Maximum of five substitutions, with a sixth allowed in extra time

== Post-match ==
Following the match, Cavalry was awarded the North Star Cup and crowned CPL champions, while striker Tobias Warschewski was named the CPL Final MVP. Although the CPL champion team is awarded a spot in the next year's CONCACAF Champions Cup, Cavalry had already qualified for the 2025 edition as a result of both them and Forge qualifying for the final. (Note: Forge had previously qualified for the 2025 CONCACAF Champions Cup as CPL Shield winners.) Cavalry and Forge faced Pumas UNAM and Monterrey respectively in round one of the Champions Cup; neither club advanced to the competition's round of 16.

== See also ==
- Canadian Premier League Finals
- 2024 Canadian Championship final
