= List of Forge FC records and statistics =

Forge FC is a Canadian professional soccer club based in Hamilton, Ontario. The club was founded in 2017 by Hamilton Tiger-Cats owner Bob Young as part of a larger effort with the Canadian Soccer Association that resulted in the creation of the Canadian Premier League.

The club began play on April 27, 2019 in the CPL's inaugural match against York9 FC (now known as Inter Toronto FC). In addition to the CPL, Forge FC has competed in the Canadian Championship, the CONCACAF League, and the CONCACAF Champions Cup. (Note: The CONCACAF Champions Cup was named the CONCACAF Champions League from 2008 to 2023.)

This list encompasses the honours won by Forge FC and records set by the club, its players, and its manager.

== Team honours ==
- Canadian Premier League
  - Champions (4): 2019, 2020, 2022, 2023
    - Runners-up (2): 2021, 2024
- CPL Shield
  - Champions (3): 2021, 2024, 2025
    - Runners-up (4): 2019, 2022, 2023, 2026
- Canadian Championship
  - Champions (1): 2026
    - Runners-up (1): 2020

== Individual honours ==
=== Canadian Premier League ===
Coach of the Year

- Bobby Smyrniotis: 2024, 2025

Defender of the Year

- Alexander Achinioti-Jönsson: 2022
- Daniel Nimick: 2025

Golden Boot

- Tristan Borges: 2019

Golden Glove

- Triston Henry: 2020, 2023
- Jassem Koleilat: 2025

Player of the Year

- Tristan Borges: 2019, 2024
- Kyle Bekker: 2020

Under 21 Canadian Player of the Year

- Tristan Borges: 2019
- Kwasi Poku: 2024

=== Canadian Championship ===
George Gross Memorial Trophy

- Dimitry Bertaud: 2026

=== CONCACAF League ===
Team of the Tournament

- Molham Babouli: 2021

== Player records ==
=== Appearances ===
As of November 2, 2025

Rank	Player	Period	CPL	CPL playoffs	Canadian Championship	Continental	Total
1	(Sweden) Alexander Achinioti-Jönsson	2019–2025	168	15	20	19	222
2	(Canada) **Kyle Bekker**	2019–present	164	14	18	21	217
3	(Canada) David Choinière	2019–2025	138	14	18	21	191
4	(Canada) **Tristan Borges**	2019; 2021–present	140	12	19	16	187
5	(Canada) Dominic Samuel	2019–2024	116	12	11	19	158
6	(Canada) Triston Henry	2019–2023	105	10	9	18	142
7	(Canada) Alessandro Hojabrpour	2022–2025	92	10	14	6	122
8	(Canada) **Noah Jensen**	2022–present	92	7	12	5	116
9	(Canada) Garven Metusala	2021–2024	85	7	10	10	112
10	(Senegal) Elimane Cissé	2019–2021; 2024–2025	77	4	5	11	97

Bold signifies current Forge FC player

=== Goalscorers ===
As of November 2, 2025

Rank	Player	Period	CPL	CPL playoffs	Canadian Championship	Continental	Total
1	(Canada) **Tristan Borges**	2019; 2021–present	34	2	2	1	39
2	(Canada) Woobens Pacius	2021–2023	26	3	3	0	32
3	(Canada) David Choinière	2019–2025	19	4	3	5	31
4	(Canada) **Kyle Bekker**	2019–present	20	1	3	2	26
5	(Syria) **Molham Babouli**	2020–2021; 2025–present	12	0	2	4	18
5	(Canada) Terran Campbell	2022–2024	16	0	1	1	18
7	(Canada) **Brian Wright**	2025–present	12	0	2	0	14
7	(Canada) **Noah Jensen**	2022–present	12	0	2	0	14
9	(Canada) Kwasi Poku	2022–2024	11	0	2	0	13
10	(Ghana) **Nana Ampomah**	2025–present	8	0	1	0	9
10	(Belgium) **Daniël Krutzen**	2019–2022; 2026–present	6	0	0	3	9
10	(Canada) Chris Nanco	2019–2022	8	0	0	1	9
10	(Canada) Anthony Novak	2019–2020	8	0	0	1	9

Bold signifies current Forge FC player

=== Clean sheets ===
As of November 2, 2025

Rank	Player	Period	CPL	CPL playoffs	Canadian Championship	Continental	Total
1	(Canada) Triston Henry	2019–2023	38	4	3	6	**51**
2	(Czech Republic) Jassem Koleilat	2024–2025	20	1	1	0	**22**
3	(Canada) Christopher Kalongo	2021–2025	4	0	0	0	**4**
3	(Guyana) Quillan Roberts	2019	4	0	0	0	**4**
5	(Canada) Baj Maan	2020–2022	3	0	0	0	**3**

Bold signifies current Forge FC player

== Team records ==
=== Firsts ===
- First CPL match: Forge FC 1–1 York9 FC, April 27, 2019
- First CPL win: Forge FC 3–0 Pacific FC, May 8, 2019
- First Canadian Championship match: Forge FC 1–1 Cavalry FC, June 4, 2019
- First CONCACAF League match and win: Forge FC 2–1 Antigua, August 1, 2019
- First Canadian Championship win: Forge FC 2–1 Valour FC, September 15, 2021
- First CONCACAF Champions Cup match: Forge FC 0–1 Cruz Azul, February 16, 2022
- First CONCACAF Champions Cup draw: Forge FC 0–0 Tigres UANL, February 3, 2026

=== Record wins ===
- Record CPL win: 5 goals
  - Valour FC 0–5 Forge FC, June 22, 2025
  - Forge FC 5–0 Valour FC, August 2, 2025
  - Forge FC 5–0 Inter Toronto FC, October 12, 2026
- Record Canadian Championship win: Forge FC 4–0 HFX Wanderers FC, May 9, 2026
- Record CONCACAF League win: Forge FC 3–0 Santos de Guápiles, November 2, 2021

=== Record defeats ===
- Record CPL defeat: York9 FC 4–0 Forge FC, October 12, 2019
- Record Canadian Championship defeat: Vancouver Whitecaps FC 4–0 Forge FC, September 16, 2025
- Record CONCACAF League defeat: Olimpia 4–1 Forge FC, August 29, 2019
- Record CONCACAF Champions Cup defeat: 3 goals
  - Monterrey 3–0 Forge FC, February 11, 2025
  - Tigres UANL 4–1 Forge FC, February 10, 2026

=== Highest scores ===
- Highest scoring CPL game: 7 goals
  - FC Edmonton 3–4 Forge FC, May 31, 2022
  - Forge FC 4–3 Atlético Ottawa, June 25, 2023
  - Atlético Ottawa 4–3 Forge FC, June 28, 2024
- Highest scoring Canadian Championship game: 4 goals
  - Forge FC 3–1 York United FC, May 1, 2024
  - Forge FC 3–1 HFX Wanderers FC, May 7, 2025
  - CF Montréal 2–2 Forge FC, July 9, 2025
  - Forge FC 2–2 Vancouver Whitecaps FC, August 13, 2025
  - Vancouver Whitecaps FC 4–0 Forge FC, September 16, 2025
  - Forge FC 4–0 HFX Wanderers FC, May 9, 2026
- Highest scoring CONCACAF League game: 5 goals, Olimpia 4–1 Forge FC, August 29, 2019
- Highest scoring CONCACAF Champions Cup game: 5 goals, Tigres UANL 4–1 Forge FC, February 10, 2026

=== Streaks ===
- Longest unbeaten run in CPL: 20 matches, April 5 – August 22, 2025
- Longest unbeaten run to start a CPL season: 20 matches, 2025 season
- Longest unbeaten run in all competitions: 24 matches, April 5 – August 22, 2025
- Longest win streak in CPL: 6 matches
  - July 8 – August 6, 2022
  - July 18 – August 22, 2025
  - May 31 – July 26, 2026

=== Record attendances ===
- Highest home attendance: 17,971, against Atlético Ottawa, May 13, 2025 at Hamilton Stadium
- Highest away attendance: 28,724, against Cruz Azul, February 24, 2022 at Estadio Azteca in Mexico City, Mexico

== Coaching records ==
As of November 2, 2025

Coach	From	To	Record				
Coach	From	To	Pld	W	D	L	Win %
(Canada) Bobby Smyrniotis	October 1, 2018	Present	235	118	54	63	50.21
Total			235	118	54	63	50.21

== Domestic results ==
=== By competition ===
As of November 2, 2025

Competition	Pld	W	D	L	GF	GA	GD	W%
Canadian Premier League	193	103	41	49	295	178	+117	53.37
Canadian Championship	20	8	7	5	27	25	+2	40
Total	213	111	48	54	322	203	+119	52.11

=== By club ===
As of November 2, 2025

Club	Pld	W	D	L	GF	GA	GD
Atlético Ottawa	26	13	7	6	41	22	+19
Cavalry FC	37	15	10	12	42	42	±0
FC Edmonton †	13	7	2	4	21	12	+9
HFX Wanderers FC	29	14	10	5	44	25	+19
Inter Toronto FC	30	18	5	7	54	31	+23
FC Laval	1	1	0	0	3	0	+3
CF Montréal	7	2	3	2	6	9	−3
CS Mont-Royal Outremont	1	1	0	0	3	0	+3
Pacific FC	26	18	3	5	45	15	+30
Toronto FC	3	1	1	1	3	3	±0
Valour FC †	26	14	3	9	46	31	+15
Vancouver FC	12	7	3	2	20	11	+9
Vancouver Whitecaps FC	2	0	1	1	2	6	−4

† Defunct

=== By Canadian Championship season ===
As of October 21, 2026

Season	Round	Opposition	Home	Away	Aggregate
2019	Second qualifying round	Cavalry FC	1–1	1–2	**2–3**
2020	Final	**Toronto FC**	1–1 (Note: Toronto FC won 5–4 on penalties)	—N/a	—N/a
2021	Quarter-finals	Valour FC	2–1	—N/a	—N/a
2021	Semi-finals	**CF Montréal**	1–1 (Note: CF Montréal won 8–7 on penalties)	—N/a	—N/a
2022	Preliminary round	CS Mont-Royal Outremont	2–0	—N/a	—N/a
2022	Quarter-finals	**CF Montréal**	—N/a	0–3	—N/a
2023	Preliminary round	FC Laval	3–0	—N/a	—N/a
2023	Quarter-finals	Atlético Ottawa	1–1 (Note: Forge FC won 3–2 on penalties)	—N/a	—N/a
2023	Semi-finals	**CF Montréal**	—N/a	0–2	—N/a
2024	Preliminary round	York United FC	3–1	—N/a	—N/a
2024	Quarter-finals	**CF Montréal**	1–1	2–1	**3–2**
2024	Semi-finals	**Toronto FC**	2–1	0–1	**2–2 (a)** (Note: Toronto FC won on away goals)
2025	Preliminary round	HFX Wanderers FC	3–1	—N/a	—N/a
2025	Quarter-finals	**CF Montréal**	1–0	2–2	**3–2**
2025	Semi-finals	**Vancouver Whitecaps FC**	2–2	0–4	**2–6**
2026	Preliminary round	HFX Wanderers FC	4–0	—N/a	—N/a
2026	Quarter-finals	CS Saint-Laurent	2–1	1–1	**3–2**
2026	Semi-finals	FC Supra du Québec	1–0	1–1	**2–1**
2026	Final	**CF Montréal**	—N/a	1–1 (a.e.t.) (Note: Forge FC won 4–2 on penalties)	—N/a

Clubs in bold are members of Major League Soccer.

== International results ==
As of February 10, 2026

=== By competition ===
Competition	Pld	W	D	L	GF	GA	GD	W%
CONCACAF League	16	7	6	3	22	17	+5	43.75
CONCACAF Champions Cup	8	0	1	7	4	18	–14	0.00
Total	24	7	7	10	26	35	–9	29.17

=== By club ===
Club	Pld	W	D	L	GF	GA	GD
(Guatemala) Antigua	2	1	1	0	2	1	+1
(Haiti) Arcahaie	1	0	1	0	1	1	0
(El Salvador) FAS	2	1	1	0	5	3	+2
(Mexico) Cruz Azul	2	0	0	2	1	4	–3
(Mexico) Guadalajara	2	0	0	2	2	5	–3
(Panama) Independiente	2	1	1	0	2	0	+2
(Honduras) Marathón	1	0	0	1	0	1	–1
(Mexico) Monterrey	2	0	0	2	0	5	–5
(Honduras) Motagua	2	0	2	0	2	2	0
(El Salvador) Municipal Limeño	1	1	0	0	2	1	+1
(Honduras) Olimpia	2	1	0	1	2	4	–2
(Costa Rica) Santos de Guápiles	2	1	0	1	4	3	+1
(Panama) Tauro	1	1	0	0	2	1	+1
(Mexico) Tigres UANL	2	0	1	1	1	4	–3

=== By country ===
Country	Pld	W	D	L	GF	GA	GD
Costa Rica	2	1	0	1	4	3	+1
El Salvador	3	2	1	0	7	4	+3
Guatemala	2	1	1	0	2	1	+1
Haiti	1	0	1	0	1	1	0
Honduras	5	1	2	2	4	7	–3
Mexico	8	0	1	7	4	18	–14
Panama	3	2	1	0	4	1	+3

=== By season ===
Competition	Season	Round	Opposition	Home	Away	Aggregate	Ref.
CONCACAF League	2019	Preliminary round	(Guatemala) Antigua	2–1	0–0	2–1	
CONCACAF League	2019	Round of 16	(Honduras) Olimpia	1–0	1–4	2–4	
CONCACAF League	2020	Preliminary round	(El Salvador) Municipal Limeño	2–1 (A)			
CONCACAF League	2020	Round of 16	(Panama) Tauro	2–1 (A)			
CONCACAF League	2020	Quarter-finals	(Haiti) Arcahaie	1–1 (2–4 p) (A)			
CONCACAF League	2020	Play-in round	(Honduras) Marathón	0–1 (A)			
CONCACAF League	2021	Preliminary round	(El Salvador) FAS	3–1	2–2	5–3	
CONCACAF League	2021	Round of 16	(Panama) Independiente	0–0	2–0	2–0	
CONCACAF League	2021	Quarter-finals	(Costa Rica) Santos de Guápiles	3–0	1–3	4–3	
CONCACAF League	2021	Semi-finals	(Honduras) Motagua	2–2	0–0	2–2 (a)	
CONCACAF Champions League	2022	Round of 16	(Mexico) Cruz Azul	0–1	1–3	1–4	
CONCACAF Champions Cup	2024	Round one	(Mexico) Guadalajara	1–3	1–2	2–5	
CONCACAF Champions Cup	2025	Round one	(Mexico) Monterrey	0–2	0–3	0–5	
CONCACAF Champions Cup	2026	Round one	(Mexico) Tigres UANL	0–0	1–4	1–4	

== Global records ==
On May 12, 2019, Forge hosted Cavalry FC at Tim Hortons Field in the first men's top-level professional soccer game in the world refereed by an all-women staff.
