= 2024 Forge FC season =

Forge FC 2024 soccer season

Forge FC
2024 season
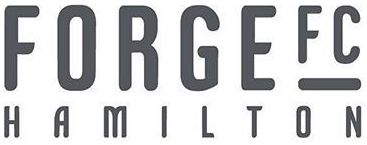
- Owner: Hamilton Sports Group
- Chairman: Bob Young
- Head coach: Bobby Smyrniotis
- Stadium: Tim Hortons Field
- Canadian Premier League: 1st
- CPL playoffs: Runners-up
- Canadian Championship: Semi-finals
- CONCACAF Champions Cup: Round one
- Top goalscorer: League: Tristan Borges; Kwasi Poku (8 each); All: Kwasi Poku (10)
- Highest home attendance: 14,923 vs. CF Montréal (May 7, CC)
- Lowest home attendance: 2,471 vs. York United FC (May 1, CC)
- Average home league attendance: 5,279
- Biggest win: 3–0 vs. York United FC (Away, April 21, CPL); 3–0 vs. York United FC (Home, June 1, CPL); 3–0 vs. HFX Wanderers FC (Home, July 27, CPL); 3–0 vs. Atlético Ottawa (Home, August 10, CPL)
- Biggest defeat: 0–3 vs. Atlético Ottawa (Away, May 25, CPL); 0–3 vs. HFX Wanderers FC (Away, September 14, CPL)
Home colours	Away colours

The 2024 Forge FC season was the sixth season in the history of Forge FC and the club's sixth season in the Canadian Premier League (CPL), the top flight in Canadian soccer. Forge was the defending CPL champions, having defeated Cavalry FC in the 2023 final for their fourth championship. The club was managed by Bobby Smyrniotis in his sixth season as head coach.

In CPL play, Forge clinched first place on October 6 to secure its second regular season title, winning the CPL Shield. This was Forge's sixth trophy in six seasons and qualified the Hammers for next season's CONCACAF Champions Cup. In the CPL playoffs, Forge advanced to the 2024 CPL final for a sixth consecutive year where they were ultimately defeated by Cavalry FC, finishing as runners-up.

In addition to the CPL, Forge competed in the Canadian Championship, defeating MLS opposition for the first time after prevailing against CF Montréal over two legs in the quarter-finals, advancing the club to the semi-finals for a second consecutive year. Forge began its season in February with continental play, facing Guadalajara in round one of the CONCACAF Champions Cup.

== Review ==
=== Background ===
Forge FC entered the season as the reigning Canadian Premier League champions after winning the 2023 Canadian Premier League final against Cavalry FC. This was the club's fourth CPL title and fifth finals appearance in five years, continuing their dynasty. They are also competing in the Canadian Championship, a domestic cup organized by the Canadian Soccer Association. In the 2023 edition, Forge reached the semifinal where they were knocked out by Major League Soccer (MLS) club CF Montréal for the third consecutive year.

Forge qualified for the 2024 CONCACAF Champions Cup on October 21, 2023, returning the club to international competition after a one-year absence. Their last appearance was in the 2022 CONCACAF Champions League, where they faced Mexican side Cruz Azul in the round of 16.

Head coach and sporting director Bobby Smyrniotis returned for his sixth season after signing a contract extension in 2023.

=== Preseason ===
On December 22, 2023, Forge announced that fifteen players from the previous season would be returning with guaranteed contracts while other players could possibly return pending negotiations for new contracts or the club activating contract extensions before December 31. This changed a week later when defender Manjrekar James, who was originally listed to return, was sold to Costa Rican side Alajuelense for an undisclosed fee. The club later announced that it had picked up the contract options of midfielder Sebastian Castello, defender Malcolm Duncan, and goalkeeper Christopher Kalongo.

On January 29, Forge re-signed Swedish midfielder and club original Alexander Achinioti-Jonsson to a multi-year deal. Over the following days, the club announced the return of versatile Senegalese midfielder Elimane Cissé, who was a member of Forge's 2019 and 2020 championship teams, and signed Ghanaian international forward Nana Ampomah, both to multi-year deals. They also signed several players to short-term and development contracts for the CONCACAF Champions Cup.

Striker Woobens Pacius announced on December 17 that he was departing Forge, with the club confirming that he was out of contract; he later signed with MLS side Nashville SC. On January 17, full-back Rezart Rama left the club, signing with KF Egnatia in the Albanian top flight. Midfielder Aboubacar Sissoko left Forge to join fellow Ontario side Atlético Ottawa.

=== CONCACAF Champions Cup ===

Starting XI for Champions Cup home match against Guadalajara on February 7.

Forge began its season in CONCACAF Champions Cup action against Liga MX giants C.D. Guadalajara. The Hammers hosted Chivas on February 7 at Tim Hortons Field where they fell 3–1. Chivas were led by United States international Cade Cowell who scored two goals and assisted on a third. Terran Campbell scored the lone goal for Forge off of a cross by Tristan Borges.

Facing difficulty in the second leg at the Estadio Akron, Forge lost 2–1 to Chivas to be defeated 5–2 on aggregate, knocking them out of the Champions Cup. Kevaughn Tavernier scored Forge's lone goal in the 93rd minute.

Forge was notably without Golden Glove winning goalkeeper Triston Henry for both matches; according to the club, he was away dealing with a personal matter. Christopher Kalongo started in his absence. Forge was also without Elimane Cissé and Nana Ampomah as they awaited their international transfer permits.

=== Canadian Premier League season ===
Prior to the start of the 2024 Canadian Premier League season, Forge brought in defender Daniel Parra on loan from Monterrey and midfielder Matteo Schiavoni on loan from CF Montréal. The club also signed goalkeeper Jassem Koleilat to a multi-year deal.

==== April ====
Forge opened its CPL campaign at home with a rematch of the 2023 CPL final against rival side Cavalry FC on April 13. Henry, Cissé, and Ampomah continued to be unavailable for the Hammers, while defender Garven Metusala missed the match due to injury. After falling behind 1–0, Forge came back on the strength of a goal and an assist from Tristan Borges and a 76th minute winning goal from Béni Badibanga to defeat Cavalry 2–1. This was Forge's first ever opening day win in its history.

The club followed-up their opening day win with victories away at 905 derby rival York United FC and back at home against Valour FC. After three matches, Tristan Borges had scored two goals and picked up three assists for five goal contributions, more than any CPLer had ever earned in the league's first three matchweeks. For his efforts, Borges was named the CPL's player of the month while Christopher Kalongo and Bobby Smyrniotis earned goalkeeper and manager of the month honours, respectively.

==== May ====

Starting XI for Canadian Championship away match against CF Montréal on May 22.

Forge's 2024 Canadian Championship run began on May 1 with a rematch against York United FC, this time at Tim Hortons Field. Jordan Hamilton scored a brace as part of a three goal first half en route to a convincing 3–1 win, advancing Forge to the quarterfinals. This set up a Canadian Championship rematch against CF Montréal for a fourth year in a row. Forge hosted the first leg on May 7 in the club's "School Day Match" before an announced crowd of 14,923 fans, the club's second most attended home match. David Choinière scored in the 31st minute to give Forge a 1–0 first half lead before Montréal responded in the second half to secure a 1–1 draw, leaving the teams tied on aggregate before the return leg later in the month.

Returning to CPL play, Forge FC traveled out west to face Pacific FC, battling them to a scoreless draw. Jassem Koleilat made his first appearance for the Hammers, keeping a clean sheet. The Hammers next returned home where they faced Vancouver FC, losing 2–1 for their first ever home defeat against the Eagles.

Forge next traveled to Montreal for the second leg of its Canadian Championship quarterfinal match. Tied 1–1 on aggregate and needing to score to overcome an away goals deficit, Forge jumped out to a 2–0 first half lead thanks to goals from Daniel Parra and Kwasi Poku. Following a two hour halftime delay due to lightning, Montréal came out and dominated the second half. However, they only managed to score one goal against the Hammers, resulting in a "historic" 2–1 Forge win and advancing them to the semifinals 3–2 on aggregate. This was the first time the club had defeated an MLS opponent. Following the win, Forge travelled to Ottawa where, tired from their Canadian Championship match, they fell 3–0 to Atlético Ottawa. It was the club's first ever defeat in Ottawa.

==== June ====
Forge FC returned home to face York United FC, securing a 3–0 victory for their third win of the season against the Nine Stripes in all competitions. Kyle Bekker, Tristan Borges, and Daniel Parra scored for Forge while Kwasi Poku contributed with two assists and a crucial goal-line clearance to help Jassem Koleilat keep the clean sheet. Forge followed this up with a trip to Calgary where a "poor" outing resulted in a 1–0 loss to Cavalry. This was Forge's third loss in their last four league matches and the third time the team had been shutout in a road match this season. Forge next traveled to Halifax to face HFX Wanderers where Béni Badibanga opened the scoring in the 49th minute and Kwasi Poku scored a stoppage time equalizer to help secure a 2–2 draw. After a delay in getting his work permit approved, Nana Ampomah made his long-awaited debut for Forge, appearing as a second-half substitute and assisting on Poku's late equalizer.

Returning home, Forge welcomed Valour back to Tim Hortons Field on June 23 where Kwasi Poku scored a first-half brace to propel Forge to a 2–1 win. The Hammers then returned to Ottawa on June 28 for their second away match against league-leaders Atlético Ottawa. In a "chaotic" and "thrilling" contest, Atlético scored a winning goal at the end of stoppage time to emerge as 4–3 winners after the sides traded leads in the second half. This was Forge's first ever CPL loss in a match in which the team had led in their history.

Forge ended the month with two wins, a draw, and two losses in league play. For scoring four goals and two assists in June, Kwasi Poku was named the CPL's player of the month.

==== July–September ====
In July, Forge began their most successful stretch of the season, amassing a record of 10 wins, 2 draws, and 2 losses between July 14 and October 6. Following wins that week against Halifax and Vancouver, Forge took over top spot in the CPL on August 18.

==== October ====
Forge traveled to Winnipeg with a chance to clinch the regular season title with a win against Valour on October 6. They had struggled to win away at Valour, securing only one victory in its seven most recent visits to Winnipeg. Noah Jensen scored in the 36th minute off of a cutback from Kyle Bekker in what proved to be the match's only goal, securing a trophy-clinching 1–0 road win. It was Forge's 100th win as a club. By winning the regular season, the Hammers won the CPL Shield, the top seed in the 2024 CPL playoffs, a berth in the 2025 CONCACAF Champions Cup, and prize money. This was Forge's second regular season title (after 2021) and sixth trophy in six years.

The Hammers returned to Hamilton to face Atlético Ottawa on October 12 in a match that didn't matter in the standings for Forge, but would be followed by a trophy ceremony. Forge surrendered two first half goals and Alessandro Hojabrpour was sent off on the way to a 2–0 loss, putting a damper on the celebrations. Daniel Parra received a caution during the match after he appeared to punch Atlético's Sam Salter; he subsequently received a three-match suspension however, as of October 27, 2024, Forge is appealing the decision. Following the match, Forge was awarded the CPL Shield before the club's supporters.

Forge completed its CPL regular season campaign away at Pacific on October 19. In a rain-soaked match, Forge fell 1–0 to end the season with a loss. It was the second year in a row Forge ended its season with consecutive defeats. Khadim Kane and Amadou Koné both started the match to help Forge surpass the CPL-mandated 2,000 minimum minutes to be played by U-21 Canadian players. By playing the match's full 90 minutes, Alexander Achinioti-Jönsson became the third outfield player in CPL history to have played every minute of a regular season.

Following the conclusion of the regular season, several Forge players were nominated for CPL awards. Tristan Borges was named Player of the Year and Bobby Smyrniotis was named Coach of the Year. Despite having left midseason, Kwasi Poku was named Best Canadian U-21 Player.

=== Canadian Premier League playoffs ===
Forge entered the CPL playoffs looking to become the first CPL team to win a league double. As the regular season winner, their playoffs began by hosting the Page playoff first semifinal at Tim Hortons Field against second seed Cavalry with a chance to advance directly to the CPL final. This repeated the matchup of the 2023 season's first semifinal where Forge defeated Cavalry in Calgary. Forge had finished two points ahead of Cavalry in the regular season and had won both home matches against the Cavs this season. Cavalry striker Tobias Warschewski's 27th-minute goal proved to be the matchwinner as Forge lost 1–0. It was only Forge's second ever loss in 14 playoff games.

Forge next hosted Atlético Ottawa in the second semifinal on November 2 with another chance to qualify for the final. Malik Owolabi-Belewu scored with a header off a corner kick in the 53rd minute to give Forge a 1–0 win, qualifying the Hammers for a sixth consecutive CPL final.

==== Canadian Premier League final ====
Forge faced Cavalry in the CPL final for the second year in a row and third time overall. This was Forge's chance to complete the league double and secure its third consecutive league championship and fifth overall. Daniel Parra made his return after completing his three-match suspension.

Cavalry were the better team in the first half, scoring twice to take a 2–0 lead into half time. Forge came to life in the second half with Alexander Achinioti-Jönsson scoring in the 52nd minute to bring the Hammers within a goal. However, Forge couldn't find an equalizer and eventually fell 2–1. This was Cavalry's first CPL title and only the second time Forge hadn't won the CPL final.

== Squad ==
As of November 9, 2024

No.	Player	Nationality	Position(s)	Date of birth (age)	Previous club	Notes
Goalkeepers
16	Jassem Koleilat	(Czech Republic)	GK	July 30, 1999 (aged 25)	(United States) Los Angeles FC 2	
29	Christopher Kalongo	(Canada)	GK	January 7, 2002 (aged 22)	(Canada) Sigma FC	
51	Daniil Antonov	(Canada)	GK	February 24, 2007 (aged 17)	(Canada) Sigma FC	U21, DEV
Defenders
2	Malcolm Duncan	(Canada)	DF	September 4, 1999 (aged 25)	(Canada) Sigma FC	
4	Dominic Samuel	(Canada)	DF	September 29, 1994 (aged 30)	(Canada) Sigma FC	
17	Daniel Parra	(Mexico)	DF	July 20, 1999 (aged 25)	(Mexico) Monterrey	INT, Loan
23	Garven-Michée Metusala	(Haiti)	DF	December 31, 1999 (aged 24)	(Canada) A.S. Blainville	
52	Oliver Clow	(Canada)	DF	May 5, 2007 (aged 17)	(Canada) Sigma FC	U21, DEV
81	Malik Owolabi-Belewu	(England)	DF	July 3, 2002 (aged 22)	(Italy) S.P.A.L.	INT
Midfielders
8	Elimane Cissé	(Senegal)	MF	March 12, 1995 (aged 29)	(Senegal) Diambars FC	INT
10	Kyle Bekker	(Canada)	MF	September 2, 1990 (aged 34)	(United States) North Carolina FC	
13	Alexander Achinioti-Jönsson	(Sweden)	MF	April 17, 1996 (aged 28)	(Sweden) IFK Värnamo	INT
21	Alessandro Hojabrpour	(Canada)	MF	January 10, 2000 (aged 24)	(Canada) Pacific FC	
22	Noah Jensen	(Canada)	MF	July 20, 1999 (aged 25)	(United States) Oakland University	
26	Orlendis Benítez	(Cuba)	MF	November 26, 1996 (aged 27)	(Canada) Simcoe County Rovers	
32	Zayne Bruno	(Canada)	MF	January 23, 2007 (aged 17)	(Canada) Sigma FC	U21, DEV
64	Khadim Kane	(Canada)	MF	May 17, 2005 (aged 19)	(Canada) CF Montréal U23	U21, EYT
88	Matteo Schiavoni	(Canada)	MF	April 5, 2005 (aged 19)	(Canada) CF Montréal	U21, Loan
Forwards
7	David Choinière	(Canada)	FW	February 7, 1997 (aged 27)	(Canada) Montreal Impact	
9	Jordan Hamilton	(Canada)	FW	March 17, 1996 (aged 28)	(Republic of Ireland) Sligo Rovers	
11	Nana Opoku Ampomah	(Ghana)	FW	January 2, 1996 (aged 28)	(Germany) Fortuna Düsseldorf	INT
12	Sebastian Castello	(Canada)	FW	October 8, 2003 (aged 21)	(Canada) Sigma FC	U21
14	Terran Campbell	(Canada)	FW	October 10, 1998 (aged 26)	(Canada) Pacific FC	
19	Tristan Borges	(Canada)	FW	August 26, 1998 (aged 26)	(Belgium) OH Leuven	
27	Victor Klonaridis	(Belgium)	FW	July 28, 1992 (aged 32)	(Greece) A.E. Kifisia	INT
39	Béni Badibanga	(Belgium)	FW	February 19, 1996 (aged 28)	(Belgium) RAAL La Louvière	INT
41	Amadou Koné	(Canada)	FW	January 28, 2005 (aged 19)	(Canada) Carleton Ravens	U21, U Sports
50	Kenan Hodzic	(Austria)	FW	January 23, 2005 (aged 19)	(Canada) Sigma FC	U21, DEV

== Transfers ==
=== In ===
==== Transferred in ====
No.	Pos.	Player	From club	Fee/notes	Date	Source
36	GK	(Canada) Dino Bontis	(Canada) Western Mustangs	Short-term contract (Note: Bontis later signed a U Sports development contract with Forge on April 12, 2024.)	January 31, 2024	
41	FW	(Canada) Amadou Koné	(Canada) Carleton Ravens	Short-term contract (Note: Koné later signed a U Sports development contract with Forge on April 12, 2024.)	January 31, 2024	
37	FW	(Canada) Kevaughn Tavernier	(Canada) Sigma FC	Short-term contract	January 31, 2024	
8	MF	(Senegal) Elimane Cissé	(Senegal) Diambars FC	Free	January 31, 2024	
11	FW	(Ghana) Nana Opoku Ampomah	(Germany) Fortuna Düsseldorf	Free	February 1, 2024	
32	MF	(Canada) Zayne Bruno	(Canada) Sigma FC	Development contract	February 7, 2024	
30	GK	(Czech Republic) Jassem Koleilat	(United States) Los Angeles FC 2	Short-term contract (Note: Koleilat later signed a multi-year deal with Forge on March 22, 2024.)	February 7, 2024	
42	GK	(Canada) Emmanuel Marmolejo	(Canada) Sigma FC	Development contract	August 14, 2024	
26	FW	(Cuba) Orlendis Benítez	(Canada) Simcoe County Rovers	Free	September 13, 2024	
51	GK	(Canada) Daniil Antonov	(Canada) Sigma FC	Development contract	September 13, 2024	
52	DF	(Canada) Oliver Clow	(Canada) Sigma FC	Development contract	September 13, 2024	
50	MF	(Austria) Kenan Hodzic	(Canada) Sigma FC	Development contract	September 13, 2024	
27	FW	(Belgium) Victor Klonaridis	(Greece) A.E. Kifisia	Free	September 13, 2024	

==== Loaned in ====
No.	Pos.	Player	From club	Fee/notes	Date	Source
17	DF	(Mexico) Daniel Parra	(Mexico) Monterrey	Season-long loan with second year option	March 12, 2024	
88	MF	(Canada) Matteo Schiavoni	(Canada) CF Montréal	Season-long loan	March 27, 2024	

==== Draft picks ====
Forge FC made two selections in the 2024 CPL–U Sports Draft. Draft picks are not automatically signed to the team roster; only those who are signed to a contract will be listed as transfers in.

Round	Selection	Pos.	Player	Nationality	University
1	8	MF	Mouhamed Ndiaye	Canada	UQTR
2	16	FW	Amadou Koné	Canada	Carleton

=== Out ===
No.	Pos.	Player	To club	Fee/notes	Date	Source
5	DF	(Canada) Manjrekar James	(Costa Rica) LD Alajuelense	Undisclosed	December 30, 2023	
24	DF	(Albania) Rezart Rama	(Albania) KF Egnatia	Contract expired	January 17, 2024	
33	MF	(Mali) Aboubacar Sissoko	(Canada) Atlético Ottawa	Contract expired	February 7, 2024	
17	FW	(Canada) Woobens Pacius	(United States) Nashville SC	Contract expired	February 15, 2024	
1	GK	(Canada) Triston Henry	(United States) Memphis 901 FC	Undisclosed	July 23, 2024	
36	GK	(Canada) Dino Bontis	(Canada) Western Mustangs	Contract expired	August 15, 2024	
20	MF	(Canada) Kwasi Poku	(Belgium) RWD Molenbeek	Undisclosed	August 21, 2024	

=== Loans out ===
Forge FC is affiliated with Sigma FC of League1 Ontario as part of the CPL's Downward Player Movement Pilot Project. The following Forge FC players featured for Sigma FC during the 2024 League1 Ontario season.

No.	Pos.	Player	Games	Notes	Source
36	GK	(Canada) Dino Bontis	17	First featured for Sigma FC on April 26, 2024.	
32	MF	(Canada) Zayne Bruno	46	First featured for Sigma FC on April 26, 2024.	
64	MF	(Canada) Khadim Kane	6	First featured for Sigma FC on July 12, 2024.	
41	FW	(Canada) Amadou Koné	7	First featured for Sigma FC on July 3, 2024.	
42	GK	(Canada) Emmanuel Marmolejo	4	First featured for Sigma FC on August 18, 2024.	
81	DF	(England) Malik Owolabi-Belewu	1	First featured for Sigma FC on July 20, 2024.	
37	FW	(Canada) Kevaughn Tavernier	19	First featured for Sigma FC on May 5, 2024.	

== Club ==
=== Staff ===
As of April 11, 2024

Executive
Caretaker	(Canada) Bob Young
Chief executive officer	(Canada) Scott Mitchell
Executive vice president	Doug Rye
President	(Canada) Matt Afinec
Vice chairman	Glenn Gibson
Coaching staff
Head coach and sporting director	(Canada) Bobby Smyrniotis
Director of youth football and assistant coach	(Canada) Kyt Selaidopoulos
Assistant and goalkeeper coach	(France) Johan Albert
Assistant coach	(Canada) David Edgar
Assistant coach	(Greece) Nikos Nentidis
Director of soccer operations	(Guyana) Jelani Smith

=== Ownership ===
In July, Hamilton-based steelmaker and Hamilton Sports Group minority owner Stelco was sold to American steel manufacturer Cleveland-Cliffs. This did not change Forge's ownership structure as Cliffs confirmed that it would retain Stelco's sports ownership. Following the approval of Stelco's sale in November, Cliffs CEO Lourenco Goncalves reaffirmed Stelco's community partnerships and expressed his interest in making Forge "a powerhouse of soccer."

=== Club partnerships ===
On May 23, Forge announced a new partnership with CS Mont-Royal Outremont. On June 25, the club announced a new partnership with the Burlington Soccer Club.

=== Community initiatives ===
==== School Day Match ====
On January 25, Forge announced a "School Day Match" as part of its CPL schedule to be played against HFX Wanderers FC on Tuesday, May 7 at 11:00 am when students in grades 6 to 12 would be able to attend. The announcement generated mixed reactions; while some fans saw this as a way to grow local interest and support, others considered the timing to be unfair to existing supporters. After Forge advanced to the Canadian Championship quarterfinals, its home quarterfinal match against CF Montréal took over the "School Day Match" slot and the CPL match against HFX Wanderers was rescheduled to later in the season. More than 10,000 students attended the match as part of the announced attendance of 14,923 fans.

=== Kits ===
Forge unveiled its 2024 primary and alternate kits at a supporters event on March 28 hosted at Tim Hortons Field. The kits continue to be produced by Macron and sponsored by Tim Hortons for a sixth consecutive season with sponsorship from CIBC on the left sleeve for a second consecutive season.

The club continued to use its 2023 home and away kits for matches in the Champions Cup.

Supplier: Macron / Sponsor: Tim Hortons / Sleeve sponsor: CIBC

Primary	Alternate	Home 2023	Away 2023

== Preseason and friendlies ==
Forge announced in a release that players reported to Hamilton for preseason on January 4, with medicals taking place on January 5 and training beginning at Redeemer University on January 6. The team traveled to Querétaro, Mexico on January 16 where they trained for two weeks before returning to Hamilton on January 31 in advance of their opening match in the CONCACAF Champions Cup on February 7 at Tim Hortons Field against C.D. Guadalajara. While in Mexico, they defeated Liga Premier side C.D. Irapuato 3–2 in a friendly with goals from Terran Campbell, Dominic Samuel, and Kevaughn Tavernier. Forge was also reported to have friendlies scheduled against other Mexican clubs, including a Liga MX opponent.

On March 13, Forge announced that the team had begun its training camp in advance of the Canadian Premier League season on March 11. They faced York United FC in a friendly on March 16, playing them to a 1–1 draw. They then played a friendly against HFX Wanderers FC on March 23.

== Competitions ==
Matches are listed in Hamilton local time: Eastern Daylight Time (UTC−4) from March 10 until November 3, and Eastern Standard Time (UTC−5) otherwise.

=== Overview ===
Competition	First match	Last match	Starting round	Final position	Record							
Competition	First match	Last match	Starting round	Final position	Pld	W	D	L	GF	GA	GD	Win %
Canadian Premier League	April 13	October 19	Matchday 1	Winners	28	15	5	8	45	31	+14	53.57
CPL Playoffs	October 27	November 9	First semifinal	Runner-up	3	1	0	2	2	3	−1	33.33
Canadian Championship	May 1	August 27	Preliminary round	Semifinals	5	3	1	1	8	5	+3	60.00
CONCACAF Champions Cup	February 7	February 13	Round one	Round one	2	0	0	2	2	5	−3	0.00
Total					38	19	6	13	57	44	+13	50.00

Last updated: November 9
Source: Competitions

=== Canadian Premier League ===
==== Table ====
Pos	Team	Pld	W	D	L	GF	GA	GD	Pts	Playoff qualification
1	Forge (S)	28	15	5	8	45	31	+14	50	First semifinal
2	Cavalry (C)	28	12	12	4	39	27	+12	48	First semifinal
3	Atlético Ottawa	28	11	11	6	42	31	+11	44	Quarterfinal
4	York United	28	11	6	11	35	36	−1	39	Play-in round
5	Pacific	28	9	7	12	27	32	−5	34	Play-in round
6	HFX Wanderers	28	7	9	12	37	43	−6	30 (Note: Head-to-head points: HFX Wanderers 7, Vancouver 4)	
7	Vancouver	28	7	9	12	29	43	−14	30	
8	Valour	28	7	7	14	31	42	−11	28	

Source: CanPL
Rules for classification: 1) Points; 2) Total number of wins; 3) Head-to-head; 4) Goal differential; 5) Goals for; 6) Away goals differential; 7) Away goals for; 8) Home goals differential; 9) Home goals for; 10) Fewest disciplinary points; 11) Most under-21 domestic player minutes; 12) Drawing of lots.
(C) Champion (qualified to Champions Cup Round one); (S) CPL Shield winner (qualified to Champions Cup Round one)

==== Results by match ====
Match	1	2	3	5	6	7	8	9	10	11	12	13	14	15	16	17	18	4^{1}	19	20	21	22	23	24	25	26	27	28
Result	W	W	W	D	L	L	W	L	D	W	L	D	W	D	W	L	W	W	W	D	W	W	L	W	W	W	L	L
Position	2	2	1	3	4	4	3	3	4	2	3	5	3	3	3	3	3	1	1	1	1	1	1	1	1	1	1	1

Source: #Matches
W = Win; D = Draw; L = Loss
Notes:
- Positions show the situation at the end of the corresponding game weeks, not the position at the conclusion of matches or game days.

^{1} Matchday 4 (vs HFX Wanderers) was postponed to August 14 due to Forge's participation in the Canadian Championship quarterfinals.

==== Matches ====
The Canadian Premier League announced each team's home openers on January 18. The full regular season schedule was released on January 23.

April 13 1	Forge FC	2–1	Cavalry FC	Hamilton, Ontario
4:00 pm	Badibanga (yellow card) 44', (goal) 76'; Parra Duran (yellow card) 51'; Borges 70'; Owolabi-Belewu (yellow card) 83'	Report	Klomp (yellow card) 54'; Camargo 60'	Stadium: Tim Hortons Field; Attendance: 7,395; Referee: Scott Bowman

April 21 2	York United FC	0–3	Forge FC	Toronto, Ontario
4:00 pm	Zeppieri (yellow card) 63'; Martin-Pereux (yellow card) 90+4'	Report	Achinioti-Jönsson (yellow card) 19'; Choinière 45+1', 67'; Badibanga (yellow card) 55', (goal) 61'; Borges (yellow card) 64'; Kane (yellow card) 90+1'	Stadium: York Lions Stadium; Attendance: 2,654; Referee: Myriam Marcotte

April 27 3	Forge FC	2–1	Valour FC	Hamilton, Ontario
4:00 pm	Choinière (yellow card) 33'; Parra Duran (yellow card) 42'; Borges 61', (yellow card) 76'; Metusala (yellow card) 70'; Jensen 90', (yellow card) 90+1'	Report	Facchineri (yellow card) 45'; Faria 65'	Stadium: Tim Hortons Field; Attendance: 3,051; Referee: Michael Venne

May 11 5	Pacific FC	0–0	Forge FC	Langford, British Columbia
5:00 pm	Quintana (yellow card) 46'; Lajeunesse (yellow card) 70'; Moore (red card) 90+3'	Report	Tavernier (yellow card) 88'	Stadium: Starlight Stadium; Attendance: 2,322; Referee: Scott Bowman

May 18 6	Forge FC	1–2	Vancouver FC	Hamilton, Ontario
4:00 pm	Metusala (yellow card) 2'; Hojabrpour (yellow card) 41'; Bekker 53'; Borges (yellow card) 61'	Report	Romeo 3', (yellow card) 71'; Dyer (yellow card) 17'; Fry 29'; Garcia (yellow card) 57'; Bah (yellow card) 83'; Cameron (yellow card) 90+5'	Stadium: Tim Hortons Field; Attendance: 4,379; Referee: Mathieu Souaré

May 25 7	Atlético Ottawa	3–0	Forge FC	Ottawa, Ontario
3:00 pm	Aparicio 13'; Sissoko (yellow card) 15'; Zapater 72'; del Campo 82'	Report	Owolabi-Belewu (yellow card) 24'; Parra Duran (yellow card) 25'; Hojabrpour (yellow card) 53'	Stadium: TD Place Stadium; Attendance: 5,895; Referee: Myriam Marcotte

June 1 8	Forge FC	3–0	York United FC	Hamilton, Ontario
4:00 pm	Bekker 29'; Borges 34', (yellow card) 45+4'; Badibanga (yellow card) 45+4'; Parra Duran 53'	Report	Botello (yellow card) 16'; Martínez (yellow card) 40'; Abatneh (yellow card) 45+4'; Ricci (yellow card) 45+4'; León (yellow card) 45+4'; Voytsekhovskyy (yellow card) 85'	Stadium: Tim Hortons Field; Attendance: 5,271; Referee: Mario Al-Ayass

June 8 9	Cavalry FC	1–0	Forge FC	Foothills County, Alberta
5:00 pm	Brooks (yellow card) 41'; Warschewski (yellow card) 45', (goal) 59'; Gutiérrez (yellow card) 45+1'; Shome (yellow card) 83'	Report	Badibanga (yellow card) 8'; Owolabi-Belewu (yellow card) 57'; Achinioti-Jönsson (yellow card) 79'; Kane (red card) 89'	Stadium: ATCO Field; Attendance: 4,691; Referee: Marie-Soleil Beaudoin

June 15 10	HFX Wanderers FC	2–2	Forge FC	Halifax, Nova Scotia
4:00 pm	Ferrin 52', 65' (pen.); Timoteo (yellow card) 79'	Report	Achinioti-Jönsson (yellow card) 9'; Hojabrpour (yellow card) 48'; Badibanga 49'; Duncan (yellow card) 64'; Kwasi Poku 90+2'; Ampomah (yellow card) 90+3'	Stadium: Wanderers Grounds; Attendance: 5,384; Referee: Scott Bowman

June 23 11	Forge FC	2–1	Valour FC	Hamilton, Ontario
4:00 pm	Kwasi Poku 12', 31'; Borges (yellow card) 79'	Report	Campbell (yellow card) 64'; Binate 71'; Swibel (yellow card) 73'; Antonoglou (yellow card) 77'; Facchineri (yellow card) 90+2'	Stadium: Tim Hortons Field; Attendance: 6,231; Referee: Renzo Villanueva

June 28 12	Atlético Ottawa	4–3	Forge FC	Ottawa, Ontario
7:00 pm	Sissoko 2', (yellow card) 81'; Ingham (yellow card) 57'; Didić 62'; del Campo 70'; Aparicio (yellow card) 86'; Torres 90+3'	Report	Samuel (yellow card) 41'; Singh 48' (o.g.); Achinioti-Jönsson 55'; Choinière (yellow card) 64'; Kwasi Poku 88'	Stadium: TD Place Stadium; Attendance: 5,081; Referee: Michael Venne

July 5 13	Forge FC	3–3	Vancouver FC	Hamilton, Ontario
7:00 pm	Owolabi-Belewu 36', (yellow card) 90+3'; Choinière (yellow card) 42', (goal) 85'; Parra Duran (yellow card) 54', (goal) 66'; Kwasi Poku (yellow card) 77'	Report	Bitar 12', 90+1', (yellow card) 75'; Wero Díaz 40'; Fry (red card) 53'	Stadium: Tim Hortons Field; Attendance: 4,301; Referee: Yusri Rudolf

July 14 14	Forge FC	2–1	Pacific FC	Hamilton, Ontario
7:00 pm	Owolabi-Belewu (yellow card) 44'; Kwasi Poku 47', 85'	Report	Sellouf 33' (pen.); Young (yellow card) 43'	Stadium: Tim Hortons Field; Attendance: 4,324; Referee: Carly Shaw-MacLaren

July 21 15	Cavalry FC	1–1	Forge FC	Foothills County, Alberta
5:00 pm	Klomp (yellow card) 23', (goal) 57'	Report	Parra Duran (yellow card) 24' (yellow-red card) 82'; Field 58' (o.g.)	Stadium: ATCO Field; Attendance: 4,569; Referee: Mathieu Souaré

July 27 16	Forge FC	3–0	HFX Wanderers FC	Hamilton, Ontario
7:00 pm	Kwasi Poku 15', 28', (yellow card) 57'; Ampomah (yellow card) 40', (goal) 69'; Owolabi-Belewu (yellow card) 90+1'	Report	Rampersad (yellow card) 84'	Stadium: Tim Hortons Field; Attendance: 6,179; Referee: Michael Venne

August 4 17	Valour FC	2–1	Forge FC	Winnipeg, Manitoba
3:00 pm	Swibel 11', (yellow card) 52'; Antonoglou (yellow card) 35'; Ressurreição 57'; Campbell (yellow card) 90+5'; Sánchez (yellow card) 90+7'	Report	Hojabrpour (yellow card) 33'; Borges (yellow card) 38', (goal) 53'; Kwasi Poku (yellow card) 64'	Stadium: Princess Auto Stadium; Attendance: 3,198; Referee: Marie-Soleil Beaudoin

August 10 18	Forge FC	3–0	Atlético Ottawa	Hamilton, Ontario
7:00 pm	Borges 21', 39'; Bekker (yellow card) 72'; Cissé 86'; Kalongo (yellow card) 90+1'	Report	de Brienne (yellow card) 42'	Stadium: Tim Hortons Field; Attendance: 5,813; Referee: Scott Bowman

August 14 4	Forge FC	2–0	HFX Wanderers FC	Hamilton, Ontario
7:00 pm	Hojabrpour 45+2'; Ampomah (yellow card) 61'; Hamilton 63'; Badibanga (yellow card) 67'; Samuel (yellow card) 82'	Report	Telfer (yellow card) 15'; Gagnon-Laparé (yellow card) 33' (red card) 33'; Daniels (yellow card) 43'	Stadium: Tim Hortons Field; Attendance: 3,983; Referee: Michael Venne
Note: Originally scheduled for May 7, the fixture was postponed due to Forge's participation in the Canadian Championship quarterfinals.

August 18 19	Vancouver FC	1–2	Forge FC	Langley, British Columbia
7:00 pm	Enyou (yellow card) 50'; Bah 72'	Report	Choinière 6'; Parra Duran (yellow card) 27'; Owolabi-Belewu (yellow card) 85'; Hojabrpour (yellow card) 87'; Schiavoni 89'	Stadium: Willoughby Community Park; Attendance: 2,524; Referee: Fabrizio Stasolla

August 23 20	York United FC	0–0	Forge FC	Toronto, Ontario
8:00 pm	Adekugbe (yellow card) 47'	Report	Bekker (yellow card) 45'; Badibanga (yellow card) 52'; Ampomah (yellow card) 59'	Stadium: York Lions Stadium; Attendance: 1,824; Referee: Mathieu Souaré
Note: Original kick-off time was moved from 7:00 pm.

August 30 21	Forge FC	2–0	Pacific FC	Hamilton, Ontario
7:00 pm	Jensen 25', 59'	Report	Domínguez (yellow card) 15'; Ceceri (yellow card) 61'; Reid (yellow card) 90+5'	Stadium: Tim Hortons Field; Attendance: 5,753; Referee: Sebastian Noshinravani

September 7 22	Forge FC	2–1	Cavalry FC	Hamilton, Ontario
7:00 pm	Borges 7', 57' (pen.), (yellow card) 62'; Owolabi-Belewu (yellow card) 45+1'; Bekker (yellow card) 90+5'	Report	Gutiérrez (yellow card) 56'; Kamdem (yellow card) 56'; Klomp 64'; Field (yellow card) 75'	Stadium: Tim Hortons Field; Attendance: 4,671; Referee: Michael Venne

September 14 23	HFX Wanderers FC	3–0	Forge FC	Halifax, Nova Scotia
2:00 pm	Rampersad (yellow card) 6', (goal) 53'; Probo 30'; Rea (yellow card) 49', (goal) 61'	Report	Achinioti-Jönsson (yellow card) 28'; Parra Duran (yellow card) 56'; Cissé (yellow card) 74'	Stadium: Wanderers Grounds; Attendance: 6,127; Referee: Mario Al-Ayass

September 21 24	Vancouver FC	1–3	Forge FC	Langley, British Columbia
6:00 pm	Rommens (yellow card) 45+1'; McDonnell (yellow card) 47'; Tahid 88'	Report	Owolabi-Belewu (yellow card) 3'; Choinière 35'; Badibanga 53'; Jensen 83'; Metusala (yellow card) 90+5'	Stadium: Willoughby Community Park; Attendance: 2,559; Referee: Yusri Rudolf

September 28 25	Forge FC	2–0	York United FC	Hamilton, Ontario
4:00 pm	Metusala (yellow card) 19'; Duncan (yellow card) 45'; Jensen 52'; Ampomah 86'	Report	Adekugbe (yellow card) 14'; Giraldo (yellow card) 41'; Córdova (yellow card) 90+3'	Stadium: Tim Hortons Field; Attendance: 6,376; Referee: Renzo Villanueva

October 6 26	Valour FC	0–1	Forge FC	Winnipeg, Manitoba
2:00 pm		Report	Jensen 36'; Hojabrpour (yellow card) 86'; Badibanga (yellow card) 90+1'	Stadium: Princess Auto Stadium; Attendance: 2,300; Referee: Ben Hoskins

October 12 27	Forge FC	0–2	Atlético Ottawa	Hamilton, Ontario
4:00 pm	Hojabrpour (yellow card) 38' (yellow-red card) 69'; Parra Duran (yellow card) 41'; Ampomah (yellow card) 73'	Report	Aparicio 14'; Salter 36'; Singh (yellow card) 43'; de Brienne (yellow card) 54'	Stadium: Tim Hortons Field; Attendance: 6,172; Referee: Marie-Soleil Beaudoin

October 19 28	Pacific FC	1–0	Forge FC	Langford, British Columbia
4:00 pm	Zanatta 32'; Reid (yellow card) 60'; Domínguez (yellow card) 85'	Report	Kane (yellow card) 45+1'	Stadium: Starlight Stadium; Attendance: 3,555; Referee: Michael Venne
Note: Original kick-off time was moved from 3:00 pm.

==== Playoff matches ====
Forge qualified for the CPL playoffs on September 21 and clinched first place and the top seed in the playoffs on October 6. That same day, the club announced that it would host the Page playoff first semifinal on October 27.

After losing the first semifinal, the CPL announced that the second semifinal was scheduled for November 2. After winning the second semifinal, the CPL confirmed that the 2024 CPL final would be played on November 9; the league had originally announced that date on October 9.

October 27 First semifinal	Forge FC	0–1	Cavalry FC	Hamilton, Ontario
4:00 pm	Owolabi-Belewu (yellow card) 90+5'	Report	Warschewski 27'	Stadium: Tim Hortons Field; Attendance: 6,521; Referee: Yusri Rudolf

November 2 Second semifinal	Forge FC	1–0	Atlético Ottawa	Hamilton, Ontario
4:00 pm	Owolabi-Belewu 53', (yellow card) 80'; Ampomah (yellow card) 70'; Badibanga (yellow card) 82'; Koleilat (yellow card) 90+5'	Report	Aparicio (yellow card) 78'	Stadium: Tim Hortons Field; Attendance: 6,315; Referee: Michael Venne

November 9 Final	Cavalry FC	2–1	Forge FC	Foothills County, Alberta
3:00 pm	Warschewski 32' (pen.); Camargo 38'; Gutiérrez (yellow card) 51'; Shaw (yellow card) 74'; Klomp (yellow card) 90+4'	Report	Achinioti-Jönsson (yellow card) 15', (goal) 52'; Badibanga (yellow card) 47'; Borges (yellow card) 88'	Stadium: ATCO Field; Attendance: 7,052; Referee: Renzo Villanueva

=== Canadian Championship ===
Canada Soccer announced the format and draw procedure for the Canadian Championship on February 22. The draw for the preliminary round and the quarterfinals was held on February 23. The draw for the semifinals and hosting rights for the single-leg final was held on May 29.

==== Preliminary round ====
The preliminary round schedule was announced on March 11.

May 1 Single leg	Forge FC	3–1	York United FC	Hamilton, Ontario
7:00 pm	Hamilton 8', 40'; Choinière 17'; Parra Duran (yellow card) 32'; Badibanga (yellow card) 61'	Report	Adekugbe (yellow card) 26'; Ferrari (yellow card) 30'; Sturing (yellow card) 70'; Martínez 87'; Córdova (yellow card) 90+4'	Stadium: Tim Hortons Field; Attendance: 2,471; Referee: Ben Hoskins

==== Quarterfinals ====
Forge announced the schedule of its quarterfinal matches against CF Montréal on May 2; Canada Soccer confirmed this the next day.

May 7 Leg 1	Forge FC	1–1	CF Montréal	Hamilton, Ontario
11:00 am	Choinière 31'; Parra Duran (yellow card) 54'	Report	Iliadis (yellow card) 9'; Jabang (yellow card) 28'; Waterman (yellow card) 51'; Duke 52'; Álvarez (yellow card) 72'	Stadium: Tim Hortons Field; Attendance: 14,923; Referee: Renzo Villanueva

May 22 Leg 2	CF Montréal	1–2 (2–3 agg.)	Forge FC	Montreal, Quebec
7:30 pm	Wanyama 65'; Campbell (yellow card) 77'	Report	Parra Duran 14', (yellow card) 48'; Kwasi Poku 24'; Choinière (yellow card) 65'; Duncan (yellow card) 69'	Stadium: Saputo Stadium; Attendance: 7,582; Referee: Marie-Soleil Beaudoin

==== Semifinals ====
Canada Soccer announced the semifinal match schedule on June 10.

July 10 Leg 1	Forge FC	2–1	Toronto FC	Hamilton, Ontario
7:00 pm	Badibanga 11', (yellow card) 66'; Kwasi Poku 14'	Report	Insigne (yellow card) 66'; Owusu 88'; Long (yellow card) 90+3'	Stadium: Tim Hortons Field; Attendance: 11,341; Referee: Ben Hoskins

August 27 Leg 2	Toronto FC	1–0 (2–2a agg.)	Forge FC	Toronto, Ontario
7:00 pm	Insigne (yellow card) 38', (goal) 50'; Etienne (yellow card) 67'; Wingo (yellow card) 67'; Franklin (yellow card) 85'	Report	Choinière (yellow card) 65'; Achinioti-Jönsson (yellow card) 88'	Stadium: BMO Field; Attendance: 20,173; Referee: Renzo Villanueva

=== CONCACAF Champions Cup ===
The CONCACAF Champions Cup draw was held on December 13, 2023. Having qualified as CPL champions, Forge entered the competition in round one and began play in February 2024.

==== Round one ====
The round one schedule was announced on December 18, 2023.

February 7 Leg 1	Forge FC (Canada)	1–3	(Mexico) Guadalajara	Hamilton, Ontario
8:00 pm	Campbell 31'; Tavernier (yellow card) 82'	Report	Cowell 26', 63'; Marín 45+1'; González (yellow card) 56'	Stadium: Tim Hortons Field; Attendance: 11,513; Referee: Victor Rivas (United States)

February 13 Leg 2	Guadalajara (Mexico)	2–1 (5–2 agg.)	(Canada) Forge FC	Zapopan, Jalisco
10:00 pm	Gutiérrez 8'; Castillo 62'	Report	Tavernier 90+3'	Stadium: Estadio Akron; Attendance: 25,059; Referee: Mario Escobar (Guatemala)

== Statistics ==
As of November 9, 2024

=== Squad and statistics ===
No.	Pos	Nat	Player	Total		CPL		CPL Playoffs		Canadian Championship		Champions Cup	
No.	Pos	Nat	Player	Apps	Goals	Apps	Goals	Apps	Goals	Apps	Goals	Apps	Goals
2	DF	(Canada) CAN	Malcolm Duncan	37	0	18+9	0	3+0	0	5+0	0	1+1	0
4	DF	(Canada) CAN	Dominic Samuel	26	0	5+13	0	2+1	0	0+3	0	1+1	0
7	FW	(Canada) CAN	David Choinière	37	7	25+2	5	3+0	0	5+0	2	1+1	0
8	MF	(Senegal) SEN	Elimane Cissé	11	1	6+5	1	0+0	0	0+0	0	0+0	0
9	FW	(Canada) CAN	Jordan Hamilton	30	3	7+15	1	0+1	0	3+2	2	0+2	0
10	MF	(Canada) CAN	Kyle Bekker	35	2	20+5	2	3+0	0	5+0	0	2+0	0
11	FW	(Ghana) GHA	Nana Opoku Ampomah	19	2	8+6	2	3+0	0	0+2	0	0+0	0
12	FW	(Canada) CAN	Sebastian Castello	2	0	0+2	0	0+0	0	0+0	0	0+0	0
13	MF	(Sweden) SWE	Alexander Achinioti-Jönsson	38	2	28+0	1	3+0	1	5+0	0	2+0	0
14	FW	(Canada) CAN	Terran Campbell	11	1	3+4	0	0+1	0	0+1	0	2+0	1
16	GK	(Czech Republic) CZE	Jassem Koleilat	18	0	14+0	0	3+0	0	1+0	0	0+0	0
17	DF	(Mexico) MEX	Daniel Parra	29	3	24+0	2	0+1	0	4+0	1	0+0	0
19	FW	(Canada) CAN	Tristan Borges	32	8	20+3	8	1+1	0	5+0	0	1+1	0
21	MF	(Canada) CAN	Alessandro Hojabrpour	37	1	26+1	1	3+0	0	5+0	0	2+0	0
22	MF	(Canada) CAN	Noah Jensen	34	6	14+11	6	2+1	0	0+4	0	1+1	0
23	DF	(Haiti) HAI	Garven Metusala	30	0	19+3	0	1+0	0	5+0	0	2+0	0
26	DF	(Cuba) CUB	Orlendis Benítez	3	0	0+2	0	0+1	0	0+0	0	0+0	0
27	FW	(Belgium) BEL	Victor Klonaridis	3	0	1+2	0	0+0	0	0+0	0	0+0	0
29	GK	(Canada) CAN	Christopher Kalongo	20	0	14+0	0	0+0	0	4+0	0	2+0	0
39	FW	(Belgium) BEL	Béni Badibanga	32	5	19+3	4	3+0	0	5+0	1	2+0	0
41	FW	(Canada) CAN	Amadou Koné	19	0	5+12	0	0+1	0	0+1	0	0+0	0
64	MF	(Canada) CAN	Khadim Kane	12	0	1+7	0	0+1	0	0+2	0	0+1	0
81	DF	(England) ENG	Malik Owolabi-Belewu	30	2	16+6	1	3+0	1	1+2	0	2+0	0
88	MF	(Canada) CAN	Matteo Schiavoni	14	1	1+13	1	0+0	0	0+0	0	0+0	0
Player(s) transferred out during this season
20	MF	(Canada) CAN	Kwasi Poku	22	10	14+3	8	0+0	0	2+2	2	1+0	0
37	FW	(Canada) CAN	Kevaughn Tavernier	7	1	0+5	0	0+0	0	0+0	0	0+2	1

=== Goal scorers ===
Rank	Nat.	Player	Pos.	CPL	CPL Playoffs	Canadian Championship	Champions Cup	TOTAL
1	(Canada)	Kwasi Poku	MF	8	0	2	0	10
2	(Canada)	Tristan Borges	FW	8	0	0	0	8
3	(Canada)	David Choinière	FW	5	0	2	0	7
4	(Canada)	Noah Jensen	MF	6	0	0	0	6
5	(Belgium)	Béni Badibanga	FW	4	0	1	0	5
6	(Canada)	Jordan Hamilton	FW	1	0	2	0	3
6	(Mexico)	Daniel Parra	DF	2	0	1	0	3
8	(Sweden)	Alexander Achinioti-Jönsson	MF	1	1	0	0	2
8	(Ghana)	Nana Opoku Ampomah	FW	2	0	0	0	2
8	(Canada)	Kyle Bekker	MF	2	0	0	0	2
8	(England)	Malik Owolabi-Belewu	DF	1	1	0	0	2
12	(Canada)	Terran Campbell	FW	0	0	0	1	1
12	(Senegal)	Elimane Cissé	MF	1	0	0	0	1
12	(Canada)	Alessandro Hojabrpour	MF	1	0	0	0	1
12	(Canada)	Matteo Schiavoni	MF	1	0	0	0	1
12	(Canada)	Kevaughn Tavernier	FW	0	0	0	1	1
Own goals				2	0	0	0	2
Totals				45	2	8	2	57

=== Clean sheets ===
Rank	Nat.	Player	CPL	CPL Playoffs	Canadian Championship	Champions Cup	TOTAL
1	(Czech Republic)	Jassem Koleilat	7	1	0	0	8
2	(Canada)	Christopher Kalongo	3	0	0	0	3
Totals			10	1	0	0	11

=== Disciplinary record ===
No.	Pos.	Nat.	Player	CPL		CPL Playoffs		Canadian Championship		Champions Cup		TOTAL	
No.	Pos.	Nat.	Player	Yellow card	Red card	Yellow card	Red card	Yellow card	Red card	Yellow card	Red card	Yellow card	Red card
2	DF	(Canada)	Malcolm Duncan	2	0	0	0	1	0	0	0	3	0
4	DF	(Canada)	Dominic Samuel	2	0	0	0	0	0	0	0	2	0
7	FW	(Canada)	David Choinière	3	0	0	0	2	0	0	0	5	0
8	MF	(Senegal)	Elimane Cissé	1	0	0	0	0	0	0	0	1	0
10	MF	(Canada)	Kyle Bekker	3	0	0	0	0	0	0	0	3	0
11	FW	(Ghana)	Nana Opoku Ampomah	5	0	1	0	0	0	0	0	6	0
13	MF	(Sweden)	Alexander Achinioti-Jönsson	4	0	1	0	1	0	0	0	6	0
16	GK	(Czech Republic)	Jassem Koleilat	0	0	1	0	0	0	0	0	1	0
17	DF	(Canada)	Daniel Parra	7	1	0	0	3	0	0	0	10	1
19	FW	(Canada)	Tristan Borges	7	0	1	0	0	0	0	0	8	0
20	MF	(Canada)	Kwasi Poku	3	0	0	0	0	0	0	0	3	0
21	MF	(Canada)	Alessandro Hojabrpour	6	1	0	0	0	0	0	0	6	1
22	MF	(Canada)	Noah Jensen	1	0	0	0	0	0	0	0	1	0
23	DF	(Haiti)	Garven Metusala	4	0	0	0	0	0	0	0	4	0
29	GK	(Canada)	Christopher Kalongo	1	0	0	0	0	0	0	0	1	0
37	FW	(Canada)	Kevaughn Tavernier	1	0	0	0	0	0	1	0	2	0
39	FW	(Belgium)	Béni Badibanga	7	0	2	0	2	0	0	0	11	0
64	MF	(Canada)	Khadim Kane	2	1	0	0	0	0	0	0	2	1
81	DF	(England)	Malik Owolabi-Belewu	9	0	2	0	0	0	0	0	11	0
Totals				68	3	8	0	9	0	1	0	86	3

== Honours ==
=== Canadian Premier League Awards ===
The 2024 Canadian Premier League Awards took place on November 7 in Calgary.

Name	Award	Status
Alexander Achinioti-Jönsson	Defender of the Year	Nominated
Béni Badibanga	Player's Player of the Year	Nominated
Kyle Bekker	Player's Player of the Year	Nominated
Kyle Bekker	Player of the Year	Nominated
Tristan Borges	Player's Player of the Year	Nominated
Tristan Borges	Player of the Year	Won
Alessandro Hojabrpour	Player's Player of the Year	Nominated
Alessandro Hojabrpour	Player of the Year	Nominated
Kwasi Poku	Best Canadian U-21 Player	Won
Bobby Smyrniotis	Coach of the Year	Won

==== Monthly awards ====
Month	Name	Award	Source
April	Tristan Borges	Player of the Month	
April	Bobby Smyrniotis	Manager of the Month	
April	Christopher Kalongo	Goalkeeper of the Month	
June	Kwasi Poku	Player of the Month	
September	Bobby Smyrniotis (2)	Manager of the Month	

==== Player of the Week ====
Week	Name	Source
2	David Choinière	
11	Kwasi Poku	
14	Kwasi Poku (2)	
18	Tristan Borges	
21	Noah Jensen	
24	David Choinière (2)	

==== Team of the Week ====
The Team of the Week is usually selected by the CPL's Kristian Jack and OneSoccer's Oliver Platt.

Week	Name	Source
1	Béni Badibanga; Tristan Borges; Malik Owolabi-Belewu	
2	Tristan Borges (2); David Choinière; Christopher Kalongo; Daniel Parra	
3	Tristan Borges (3); Christopher Kalongo (2); Daniel Parra (2)	
5	Alexander Achinioti-Jönsson; Alessandro Hojabrpour; Daniel Parra (3)	
8	Tristan Borges (4); Daniel Parra (4); Kwasi Poku	
9	Malik Owolabi-Belewu (2)	
10	Béni Badibanga (2)	
11	Kyle Bekker; Kwasi Poku (2)	
13	David Choinière (2)	
14	Tristan Borges (5); Alessandro Hojabrpour (2); Daniel Parra (5); Kwasi Poku (3)	
15	Kyle Bekker (2); Christopher Kalongo (3)	
16	Alexander Achinioti-Jönsson (2); Kyle Bekker (3); Jassem Koleilat; Kwasi Poku (4)	
18	Kyle Bekker (4); Tristan Borges (6); Alessandro Hojabrpour (3)	
19	Jordan Hamilton; Alessandro Hojabrpour (4); Jassem Koleilat (2)	
20	Alessandro Hojabrpour (5)	
21	Noah Jensen; Chris Kalongo (4); Dominic Samuel	
22	Alexander Achinioti-Jönsson (3); Tristan Borges (7); Jassem Koleilat (3)	
24	Béni Badibanga (3); David Choinière (3); Elimane Cissé	
25	Alexander Achinioti-Jönsson (4); Béni Badibanga (4); Kyle Bekker (5); Noah Jensen (2)	
26	Kyle Bekker (6); Noah Jensen (3); Garven Metusala	

== Sources ==
- "Club roster: 2024 Concacaf Champions Cup" (PDF). CONCACAF. January 30, 2024. p. 10. Archived (PDF) from the original on January 31, 2024.
