= Kevaughn Tavernier =

Canadian soccer player (born 2006)

Personal information
- Date of birth: February 24, 2006 (age 20)
- Place of birth: Brampton, Ontario, Canada
- Height: 1.75 m (5 ft 9 in)
- Position: Forward

Team information
- Current team: Forge FC

Youth career
- Brampton YSC
- –2022: Glen Shields SC

Senior career*
Years	Team	Apps	(Gls)
2023	Sigma FC	10	(2)
2023–2024	Forge FC	7	(0)
2024	→ Sigma FC (loan)	15	(15)
2024	→ Sigma FC B (loan)	0	(0)
2026–	Forge FC	3	(0)
2026–	→ Sigma FC (loan)	14	(9)

International career^{‡}
2023	Canada U17	6	(0)
2024	Canada U20	2	(2)
- * Club domestic league appearances and goals as of October 25, 2026 ‡ National team caps and goals as of February 27, 2024

Kevaughn Tavernier (born February 24, 2006) is a Canadian soccer player who plays for Forge FC in the Canadian Premier League.

== Early life ==
Tavernier played youth soccer with Glen Shields SC.

== Club career ==
In 2023, he began playing with Sigma FC in League1 Ontario. In his season debut, he scored a brace, earning the league's performance of the week honour.

In June 2023, he signed a developmental contract with Canadian Premier League club Forge FC. On September 9, he made his professional debut in a substitute appearance against Cavalry FC; he then made his first start the following week, on September 17, against Valour FC. In October of the same year, he was a part of the Forge squad that won their fourth league title, following a 2–1 victory over Cavalry FC in the play-off final. On February 13, 2024, Tavernier scored his first professional goal for Forge FC in a round one CONCACAF Champions Cup match against Mexican side Guadalajara. In March 2024, he went on trial with AS Monaco's reserves. In 2024, while playing with Sigma FC, he was named the League1 Ontario Young Player of the Season and a league Second Team All-Star.

On January 30, 2026, he returned to Forge FC, signing a multi-year professional contract, after last playing for the club in 2024.

== International career ==
Born in Canada, Tavernier is of Jamaican descent (where his mother was born). In September 2023, he earned his first international call-up to the Canadian U17 team, ahead of a pair of friendlies against Brazil. He then debuted for the team, in their first match on September 29. In November 2023, Tavernier was named to the roster for the 2023 FIFA U-17 World Cup. He appeared in all three of the team's matches at the tournament.

In February 2024, Tavernier was named to the Canadian U-20 side ahead of the 2024 CONCACAF U-20 Championship qualifying tournament. He scored in his debut for the under-20s on February 23, in an 8–0 win over Dominica.

== Career statistics ==
As of match played August 28, 2024

Club	Season	League			Playoffs		Domestic Cup		Continental		Other		Total	
Club	Season	Division	Apps	Goals	Apps	Goals	Apps	Goals	Apps	Goals	Apps	Goals	Apps	Goals
Sigma FC	2023	League1 Ontario	10	2	–		–		–		–		10	2
Forge FC	2023	Canadian Premier League	2	0	0	0	0	0	–		–		2	0
Forge FC	2024	Canadian Premier League	5	0	0	0	0	0	2 (Note: Appearances in CONCACAF Champions Cup)	1	–		7	1
Forge FC	Total		7	0	0	0	0	0	2	1	0	0	9	1
Sigma FC (loan)	2024	League1 Ontario Premier	15	15	–		–		–		2 (Note: Appearances in L1O Cup)	1	16	16
Sigma FC B (loan)	2024	League2 Ontario	0	0	2	0	–		–		–		2	0
Career total			32	17	2	0	0	0	2	1	2	1	38	19

== Honours ==
Individual

- League1 Ontario Premier Young Player of the Year Award: 2024
