= Dominic Samuel =

Dominic Samuel can refer to:

- Dominic Samuel (English footballer) (born April 1994), English professional soccer player who plays striker
- Dominic Samuel (Canadian soccer) (born September 1994), Canadian professional soccer player who plays defender
