= Alessandro Hojabrpour =

Canadian soccer player

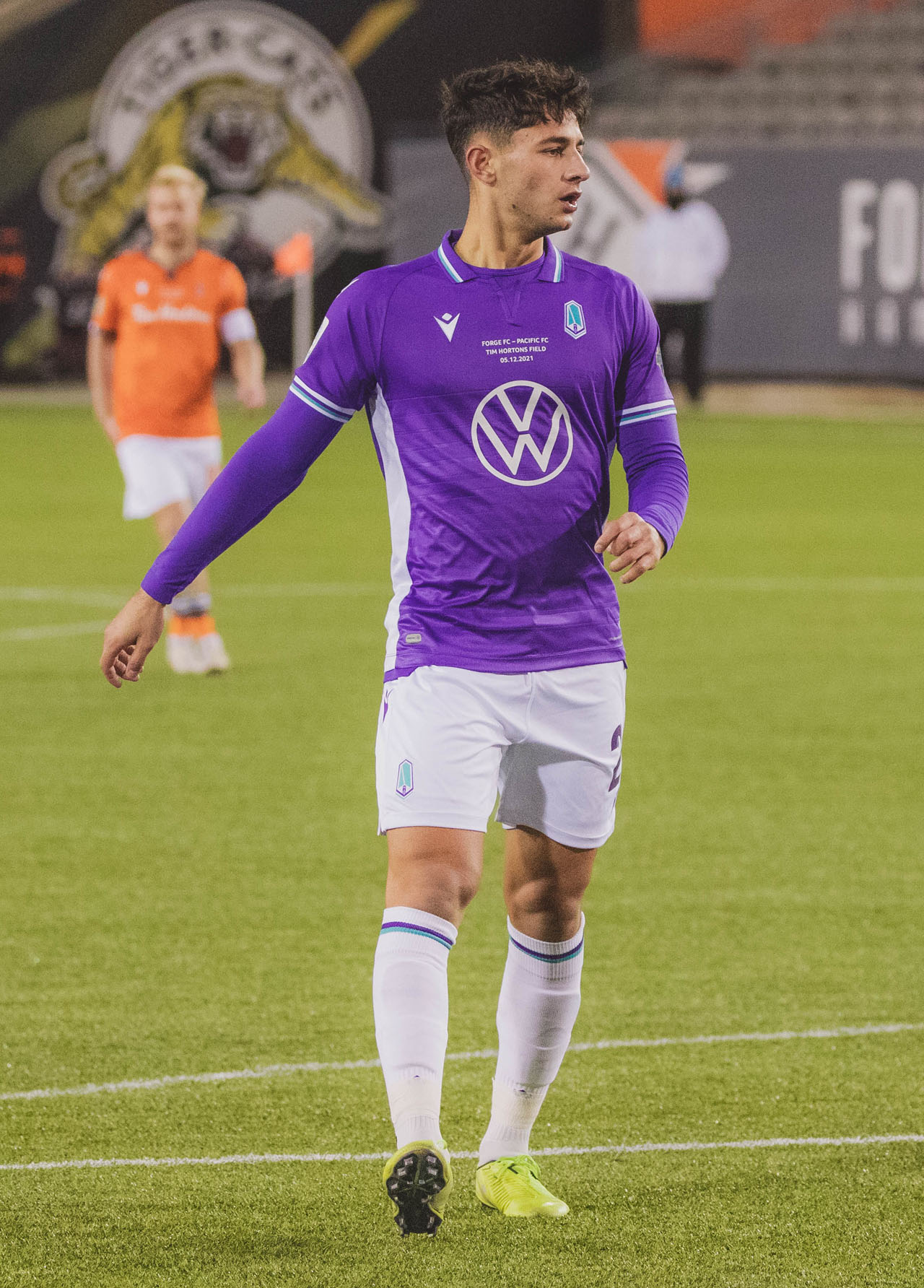
- Hojabrpour with Pacific FC in 2021

Personal information
- Full name: Alessandro Feridun Hojabrpour
- Date of birth: January 10, 2000 (age 26)
- Place of birth: Burnaby, Canada
- Height: 1.81 m (5 ft 11 1/2 in)
- Position: Defensive midfielder

Team information
- Current team: FC Emmen
- Number: 30

Youth career
- Italian Canadian SF
- Vancouver Whitecaps FC
- Coquitlam Metro-Ford SC
- 2012–2017: Vancouver Whitecaps FC
- 2017–2018: Lokomotiv Plovdiv

Senior career*
Years	Team	Apps	(Gls)
2019–2021	Pacific FC	56	(1)
2022–2025	Forge FC	93	(4)
2026–	FC Emmen	9	(0)

International career^{‡}
2017	Canada U17	3	(1)
- * Club domestic league appearances and goals as of April 28, 2026 ‡ National team caps and goals as of May 12, 2019

Alessandro Feridun Hojabrpour (Persian: آلساندرو فریدون هژبرپور; born January 10, 2000) is a Canadian professional soccer player who plays as a central midfielder for Eerste Divisie club FC Emmen.

== Early life ==
Hojabrpour began playing soccer at age three with the Italian Canadian Sports Federation. In 2007–08, he participated in the Vancouver Whitecaps FC Prospects program, before joining Coquitlam Metro-Ford SC. In 2012, he joined the Vancouver Whitecaps Academy Residency. In 2017, after playing in a youth tournament in Bulgaria, he was recruited and joined Lokomotiv Plovdiv's U19 team.

== Club career ==
=== Pacific FC ===
Hojabrpour signed with a professional contract with Pacific FC of the Canadian Premier League on January 15, 2019; making his club debut on May 12, 2019, against FC Edmonton. He was given his first start for the club in the next game during a Canadian Championship match against Cavalry FC on May 15, 2019. Hojabrpour re-signed with Pacific in December 2019 for the 2020 season and in December 2020 for the 2021 season.

During the 2021 Canadian Premier League season, Hojabrpour earned his first assist for the club on July 17 on a goal by Josh Heard against Forge FC. He scored his first goal for Pacific on October 6 against FC Edmonton at Clarke Stadium. Hojabrpour helped Pacific reach their first CPL final on November 20, 2021, after a 2–1 extra time win over Cavalry FC at ATCO Field. On December 5, 2021, Hojabrpour scored the winning goal to win Pacific the 2021 Canadian Premier League Final against two-time defending champions Forge FC at Tim Hortons Field. At the end of the season, he was given the 2021 under-21 player of the year award. After the season, he departed the club, having made 63 appearances for the club across all competitions over his three seasons, scoring two goals and adding two assists.

=== Forge FC ===
In January 2022, Hojabrpour signed with fellow Canadian Premier League side Forge FC ahead of the 2022 Canadian Premier League season. Hojabrpour made his club debut on February 16, 2022, in a CONCACAF Champions League match against Liga MX side Cruz Azul. He scored his first goal for Forge on April 16, 2022, in their 2022 home opener against Cavalry FC. On October 23, 2022, Hojabrpour provided an assist in the semifinal to help Forge reach the 2022 Canadian Premier League Final. On October 30, 2022, Hojabrpour scored in the final for his second consecutive championship-winning goal of the Canadian Premier League Finals, helping Forge win the 2022 championship over Atlético Ottawa.

On April 22, 2023, Hojabrpour made his 100th professional appearance in a 1–1 league draw against HFX Wanderers: in the process, he became the third player (behind Dominick Zator and Terran Campbell) to ever hit the 100-game milestone in all competitions for multiple CPL clubs. On October 14, 2023, Hojabrpour scored a goal in the semifinal to help lead Forge to the 2023 Canadian Premier League final. At the end of the season, he helped Forge win their fourth league title, which was his third consecutive title (Pacific in 2021 and Forge in 2022 and 2023).

The following 2024 season, Hojabrpour scored his first goal of the season on August 14, 2024, against HFX Wanderers. He earned five selections to the Team of the Week throughout the regular season. In October 2024, Hojabrpour was nominated for the Players' Player of the Year award, having established himself in the Forge midfield and appearing in all but one regular season match. In November 2024, Hojabrpour was also nominated for the Player of the Year award. Hojabrpour and Forge finished the regular season as CPL Shield winners. On November 2, 2024, Hojabrpour and Forge advanced to the 2024 Canadian Premier League final after a semi-final win over Atlético Ottawa. He departed the club after the 2024 season, following the expiration of his contract.

In February 2025, following a trial with MLS side Orlando City, Hojabrpour signed a new multi-year contract with Forge FC ahead of the 2025 season. He made his season debut on February 5, 2025, in a CONCACAF Champions Cup match against Liga MX side Monterrey. On August 18, 2025, he was named to his fourth CPL Team of the Week for the season. On October 18, 2025, Hojabrpour scored a goal against York United to help Forge win the 2025 CPL Shield for the second consecutive season.

=== FC Emmen ===
In January 2026, Hojabrpour signed for FC Emmen in the Eerste Divisie.

== International career ==
Hojabrpour was born in Burnaby, Canada to an Italian mother and Iranian father, and also holds an Italian passport.

In October 2014, he made his debut in the Canadian national program, attending a camp with the Canada U15 team. He represented the Canada men's national under-17 soccer team in the 2017 CONCACAF U-17 Championship, scoring a goal against Cuba on April 25, 2017.

== Style of play ==
Hojabrpour can operate as a central midfielder or defensive midfielder. He has been praised for his defensive abilities and reliability in midfield.

== Career statistics ==
As of November 3, 2025

Club	Division	Season	League		Playoffs		National Cup		Continental		Total	
Club	Division	Season	Apps	Goals	Apps	Goals	Apps	Goals	Apps	Goals	Apps	Goals
Pacific FC	Canadian Premier League	2019	22	0	—		2	0	—		24	0
Pacific FC	Canadian Premier League	2020	10	0	—		—		—		10	0
Pacific FC	Canadian Premier League	2021	24	1	2	1	3	0	—		29	2
Pacific FC	Total		56	1	2	1	5	0	0	0	63	2
Forge FC	Canadian Premier League	2022	26	2	3	1	3 (Note: Includes appearance(s) in both the 2020 Canadian Championship, which was held in 2022, and the 2022 Canadian Championship)	0	2 (Note: Appearances in CONCACAF Champions League)	0	34	3
Forge FC	Canadian Premier League	2023	22	0	2	1	3	0	0	0	17	1
Forge FC	Canadian Premier League	2024	27	1	3	0	5	0	2	0	37	1
Forge FC	Canadian Premier League	2025	18	1	2	0	3	0	2	0	25	1
Forge FC	Total		93	4	10	2	14	0	6	0	123	6
Career total			149	5	12	3	19	0	6	0	186	8

== Honours ==
Pacific FC

- Canadian Premier League: 2021

Forge FC

- Canadian Premier League: 2022, 2023
- CPL Shield: 2024, 2025

Individual

- Canadian Premier League Best Under 21 Canadian Player of the Year: 2021
