= Malik Owolabi-Belewu =

English professional footballer

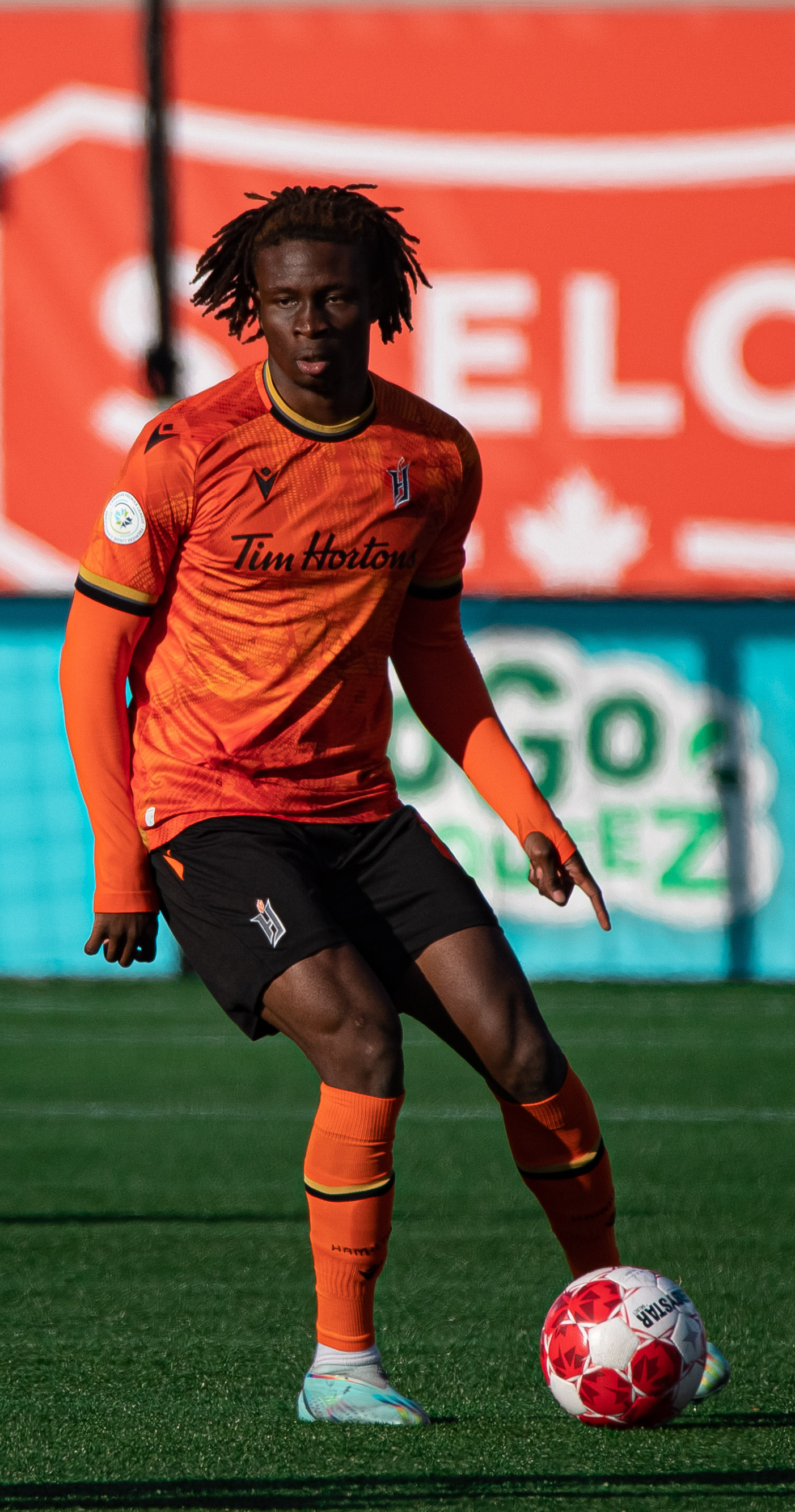
- Owolabi-Belewu with Forge FC in 2024

Personal information
- Full name: Abdul-Malik Justin Owolabi-Belewu
- Date of birth: 3 July 2002 (age 24)
- Place of birth: London, England
- Height: 1.88 m (6 ft 2 in)
- Position: Centre-back

Team information
- Current team: Chesterfield

Youth career
- Junior Red Spartans
- Whitecaps London SC
- 2018–2020: Toronto FC
- 2020–2021: SPAL

Senior career*
Years	Team	Apps	(Gls)
2022–2025	Forge FC	67	(2)
2024–2025	→ Sigma FC (loan)	1	(0)
2026–	Chesterfield	7	(0)
- * Club domestic league appearances and goals as of 08:30, 6 December 2025 (UTC)

Abdul-Malik Justin Owolabi-Belewu (born 3 July 2002) is an English professional footballer who plays as a centre-back for Chesterfield in EFL League Two.

== Early life ==
Born in London, England, Owolabi-Belewu began playing youth football with the Junior Red Spartans. When he was 13, he moved to London, Ontario, Canada with his family. He began playing with Whitecaps London SC, later being invited to try out for the official Vancouver Whitecaps FC Academy, however, due to an injury, he was unable to make the team. In 2018, he joined the Toronto FC Academy. While with the Toronto FC academy, he converted from striker to defender.

In 2020, he returned to England. In June 2020, he was invited to trial with English club Chelsea, however was unable to attend due to COVID-19 pandemic travel restrictions. He also had interest from English clubs Crystal Palace and Sunderland, Italian club AS Roma, German club Hertha Berlin, Belgian club Anderlecht, and French club OGC Nice. In 2020, he had been set to join Phoenix Sports F.C. in the English eighth tier Isthmian League, however, before officially signing, Italian club SPAL invited him for a trial.

== Club career ==
In 2020, he signed for Italian Serie B side SPAL. He spent the majority of the time with the U19 squad, making the bench for the first team for two cup matches, but not making an appearance.

In April 2022, he signed for Canadian Premier League club Forge FC. On 14 May 2022, Owolabi-Belewu made his debut for the club in a 1–1 draw with Atlético Ottawa. He scored his first goal on 1 October 2022, against York United. He won the CPL title with the club in 2022. In October 2023, he helped Forge win their fourth league title, following a 2–1 win over Cavalry FC in the play-off final. After the 2024 season, the club picked up his option for the 2025 season. On 7 August 2025, he agreed a deal to sign for League Two side Chesterfield on 1 January 2026 after the expiration of his contract with Forge.

== International career ==
At international level, he is eligible to represent England through birth, and Nigeria through his parents.

In 2017, he attended a camp with the Canada U15 national team.

In 2019, he was invited to a camp with the Nigeria U17 team, but was unable to accept the call-up.

In 2020, he committed to representing Nigeria at international level.

== Career statistics ==
As of 3 November 2025

Appearances and goals by club, season and competition
Club	Season	League			Playoffs		Domestic Cup		Continental		Total	
Club	Season	Division	Apps	Goals	Apps	Goals	Apps	Goals	Apps	Goals	Apps	Goals
Forge FC	2022	Canadian Premier League	18	1	3	0	2 (Note: Includes appearance in the 2020 Canadian Championship final (played in 2022))	0	0	0	23	1
Forge FC	2023	Canadian Premier League	16	0	2	0	1	0	—		19	0
Forge FC	2024	Canadian Premier League	22	1	3	1	3	0	2	0	30	2
Forge FC	2025	Canadian Premier League	11	0	2	0	2	0	0	0	15	0
Forge FC	Total		67	2	10	1	8	0	2	0	87	3
Sigma FC (loan)	2024	League1 Ontario Premier	1	0	—		—		0	0	1	0
Sigma FC (loan)	2025	League1 Ontario Premier	1	0	—		—		0	0	1	0
Sigma FC (loan)	Total		2	0	0	0	0	0	0	0	2	0
Career total			69	2	10	1	8	0	2	0	89	3
