= Orlendis Benítez =

Cuban footballer (born 1996)

Personal information
- Full name: Orlendis Carlos Benítez Hernández
- Date of birth: 26 November 1996 (age 29)
- Place of birth: Cuba
- Height: 1.71 m (5 ft 7 in)
- Position: Midfielder

Senior career*
Years	Team	Apps	(Gls)
2016–2019	FC La Habana		
2021–2022	Vaughan Azzurri	24	(8)
2022	→ Forge FC (loan)	3	(0)
2023–2024	Simcoe County Rovers	29	(20)
2024	Forge FC	2	(0)
2025	Scrosoppi FC	16	(8)
2026–	International FC	1	(1)
- * Club domestic league appearances and goals as of 18 April 2026

Orlendis Carlos Benítez Hernández (born 26 November 1996) is a Cuban professional footballer who plays for International FC in League1 Ontario.

== Playing career ==
He began his career in his native Cuba with FC La Habana. During the 2018–19 season, he was named the Best Player of the Campeonato Nacional de Fútbol de Cuba.

In 2021 and 2022, he played for Vaughan Azzurri in League1 Ontario. In June 2022, he joined Canadian Premier League club Forge FC on a short-term loan. He made his debut for Forge on 12 June against Pacific FC. He then returned to Vaughan, helping them win the league title.

In February 2023, he signed with the Simcoe County Rovers in League1 Ontario. He was named the L1O Midfielder of the Year and a First Team All-Star in 2023, after helping Simcoe win the league title.

In September 2024, he signed with Forge FC for the remainder of the 2024 season. After the season, the club picked up his option for 2025. However, he instead returned to League1 Ontario and joined Scrosoppi FC.

== International career ==
In late August 2019, he received his first call-up to the Cuba national football team for their 2019–20 CONCACAF Nations League matches against Canada in September. However, ahead of the match, he defected from the squad to settle in Canada and not return to Cuba, with the help of his uncle (whom he had never met) who was a baseball player who had also defected while in Canada.

== Career statistics ==
As of 23 August 2025

Club	Season	League			Playoffs		National Cup		League Cup		Continental		Total	
Club	Season	Division	Apps	Goals	Apps	Goals	Apps	Goals	Apps	Goals	Apps	Goals	Apps	Goals
Vaughan Azzurri	2021	League1 Ontario	8	3	1	0	—		—		—		9	3
Vaughan Azzurri	2022	League1 Ontario	16	5	2	1	—		—		—		18	6
Vaughan Azzurri	Total		24	8	3	1	0	0	0	0	0	0	27	9
Forge FC (loan)	2022	Canadian Premier League	3	0	0	0	0	0	—		0	0	3	0
Simcoe County Rovers FC	2023	League1 Ontario	19	15	2	1	—		—		—		21	16
Simcoe County Rovers FC	2024	League1 Ontario Premier	10	5	—		1	0	4	1	—		15	6
Simcoe County Rovers FC	Total		29	20	2	1	2	0	4	1	0	0	31	22
Forge FC	2024	Canadian Premier League	2	0	1	0	0	0	—		0	0	3	0
Scrosoppi FC	2025	League1 Ontario Premier	16	8	—		1	0	2	0	—		19	8
Career total			77	36	6	2	3	0	6	1	0	0	88	39
