= Béni Badibanga =

Belgian footballer (born 1996)

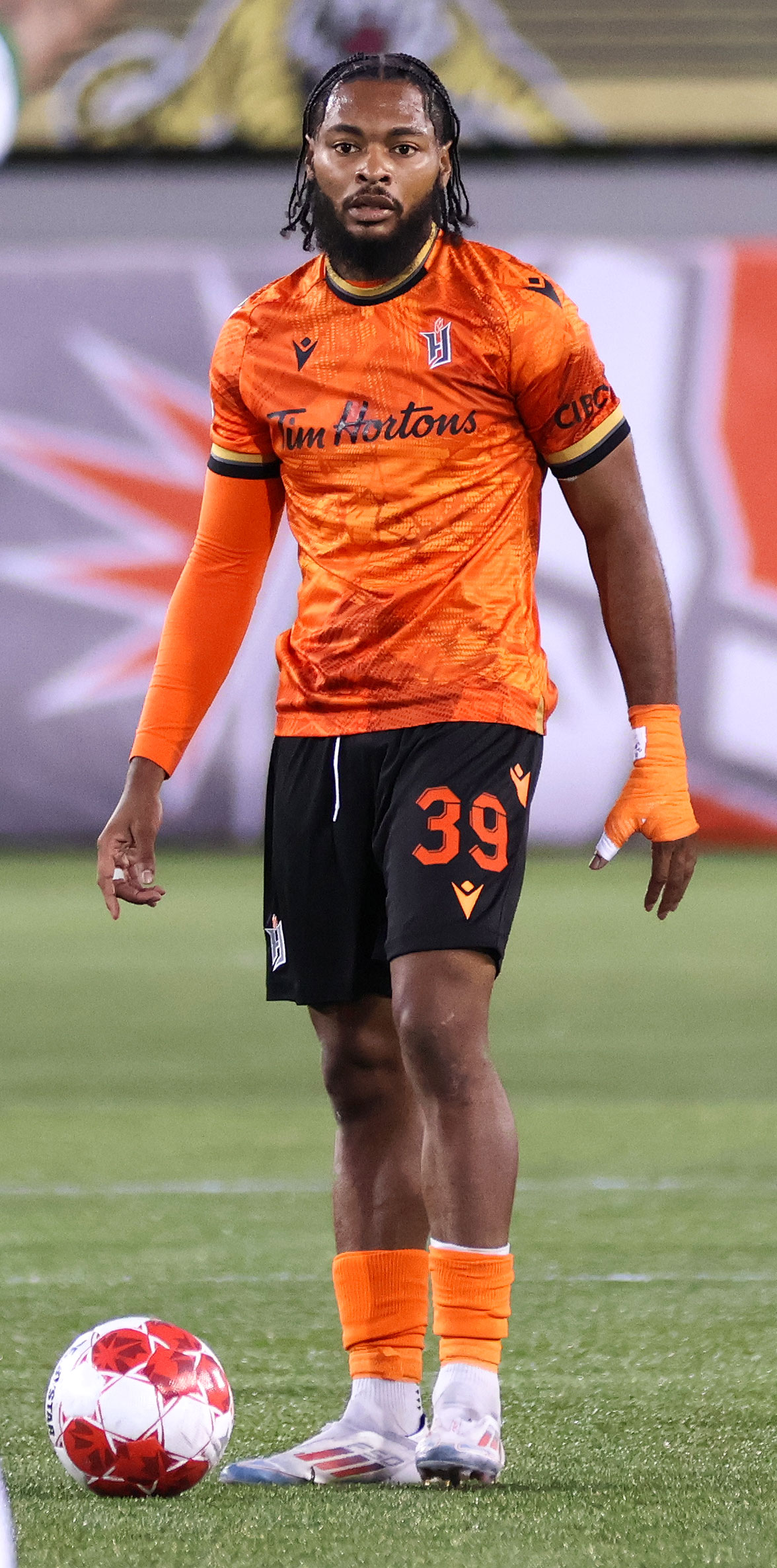
- Badibanga with Forge FC in 2024

Personal information
- Full name: Béni Badibanga Diata
- Date of birth: 19 February 1996 (age 30)
- Place of birth: Evere, Belgium
- Height: 1.76 m (5 ft 9 1/2 in)
- Position: Winger

Team information
- Current team: Inter Toronto FC

Youth career
- 2004–2005: RRC de Waterloo
- 2005–2008: RCS Brainois
- 2008–2011: AFC Tubize
- 2011–2015: Standard Liège

Senior career*
Years	Team	Apps	(Gls)
2015–2018	Standard Liège	27	(1)
2017	→ Roda JC (loan)	6	(0)
2018	→ Lierse (loan)	10	(0)
2018–2020	Waasland-Beveren	53	(4)
2020–2021	Excel Mouscron	26	(0)
2022	Raja Casablanca	8	(1)
2022–2023	RAAL La Louvière	22	(9)
2023–2025	Forge FC	32	(6)
2026–	Inter Toronto FC	19	(0)

International career^{‡}
2015	Belgium U19	5	(0)
2015	Belgium U21	1	(0)
- * Club domestic league appearances and goals as of 31 October 2026 ‡ National team caps and goals as of 12 November 2015

Béni Badibanga Diata (born 19 February 1996) is a Belgian footballer who plays for Inter Toronto FC in the Canadian Premier League. He spent most of his career in Belgium, with over 100 appearances in the Belgian top flight and has also played professionally in Morocco and Canada.

== Early life ==
Badibanga was born in Belgium and is a citizen of the Democratic Republic of the Congo. As his father was a businessman with a multinational Congolese company in the mining industry, he moved to London, England for a period, before moving to northern France near Lille. He later moved to Belgium, where he began playing youth football with RRC de Waterloo. He then joined RCS Brainois. At age 12, he joined AFC Tubize. When he was 14, he was approached by Standard Liège, but chose not to join as he was not yet mentally prepared to leave home. The following year, he was approached again by Standard Liège as well as Anderlecht, and chose to join Standard Liège, as his brother played at Anderlecht and he did not want to be in his shadow.

== Club career ==
In February 2015, he signed a professional contract with the Standard Liège first team. On 25 July 2015, he made his senior debut against KV Kortrijk in a league match. In January 2017, he went on loan with Dutch Eredivisie club Roda JC. At the end of January 2018, he was loaned to Lierse in the Belgian First Division B. He left Standard Liège in the summer of 2018, having scored one goal and adding two assists in 37 appearances.

In July 2018, he signed with Belgian First Division A side Waasland-Beveren.

In July 2020, Badibanga joined Belgian Pro League club Royal Excel Mouscron.

In January 2022, he signed with Moroccan club Raja Casablanca in the Botola. In August 2022, he terminated his contract with the club by mutual consent.

In September 2022, he signed with RAAL La Louvière in the third tier Belgian National Division 1. In December 2022, it was announced that he would leave the club and would not play in the second half of the season. His departure was finalized in May 2023.

In July 2023, Badibanga signed with Canadian Premier League club Forge FC. He made his debut for the club on 4 August 2023, in a substitute appearance against Cavalry FC. On 19 August, he scored his first goal for the club in a 1–1 draw against the HFX Wanderers. On 28 October, he helped Forge win their fourth league title, scoring a goal in a 2–1 win over Cavalry FC in the final. At the end of the season, he was named to the CPL Best XI. On 10 July 2024, he scored a goal from midfield against Toronto FC in the 2024 Canadian Championship. After the 2024 season, the club picked up his option for the 2025 season. The situation evolved into a contract dispute with Forge claiming he was under contract, while Badibanga claimed he terminated his contract with the club for just cause.

In January 2026, he signed a one-year contract with Inter Toronto FC.

== International career ==
Badibanga is eligible to play for DR Congo and Belgium.

In 2015, he played for Belgium U19 in the 2015 UEFA European Under-19 Championship qualification and Belgium U21 in the 2017 UEFA European Under-21 Championship qualification.

He was called up by the DR Congo national team for the 2021 Africa Cup of Nations qualification.

== Personal life ==
He is the son of Samy Badibanga, the former Prime Minister of the Democratic Republic of the Congo. He is the cousin of fellow professional footballers Ziguy Badibanga and Luis Pedro Cavanda.

He also works as a fashion model for American brand Fashion Nova.

== Career statistics ==
As of 9 November 2024

Club	Season	League			Playoffs		National Cup (Note: Includes appearances in the Belgian Cup and the Canadian Championship)		Continental (Note: Includes appearances in UEFA Europa League, CAF Champions League and the CONCACAF Champions Cup)		Other		Total	
Club	Season	Division	Apps	Goals	Apps	Goals	Apps	Goals	Apps	Goals	Apps	Goals	Apps	Goals
Standard Liège	2015–16	Belgian Pro League	23	1	—		3	0	3	0	—		29	1
Standard Liège	2016–17	Belgian First Division A	2	0	—		1	0	3	0	—		6	0
Standard Liège	2017–18	Belgian First Division A	2	0	—		0	0	—		—		2	0
Standard Liège	Total		27	1	0	0	4	0	6	0	0	0	37	1
Roda JC (loan)	2016–17	Eredivisie	6	0	3	0	0	0	—		—		9	0
Lierse (loan)	2017–18	Belgian First Division B	10	0	—		0	0	—		—		10	0
Waasland-Beveren	2018–19	Belgian First Division A	25	2	—		1	0	—		—		26	2
Waasland-Beveren	2019–20	Belgian First Division A	28	2	—		0	0	—		—		28	2
Waasland-Beveren	Total		53	4	0	0	1	0	0	0	0	0	54	4
Excel Mouscron	2020–21	Belgian First Division A	26	0	—		1	0	—		—		27	0
Raja Casablanca	2021–22	Botola Pro	8	1	—		0	0	3	0	—		11	1
RAAL La Louvière	2022–23	Belgian National Division 1	22	9	—		1	0	—		—		23	9
Forge FC	2023	Canadian Premier League	10	2	2	1	0	0	—		—		12	3
Forge FC	2024	Canadian Premier League	22	4	3	0	5	1	2	0	—		32	5
Forge FC	Total		32	6	5	1	5	1	2	0	0	0	44	8
Career totals			184	21	8	1	12	1	11	0	0	0	215	23
