= Matteo Schiavoni =

Canadian soccer player (born 2005)

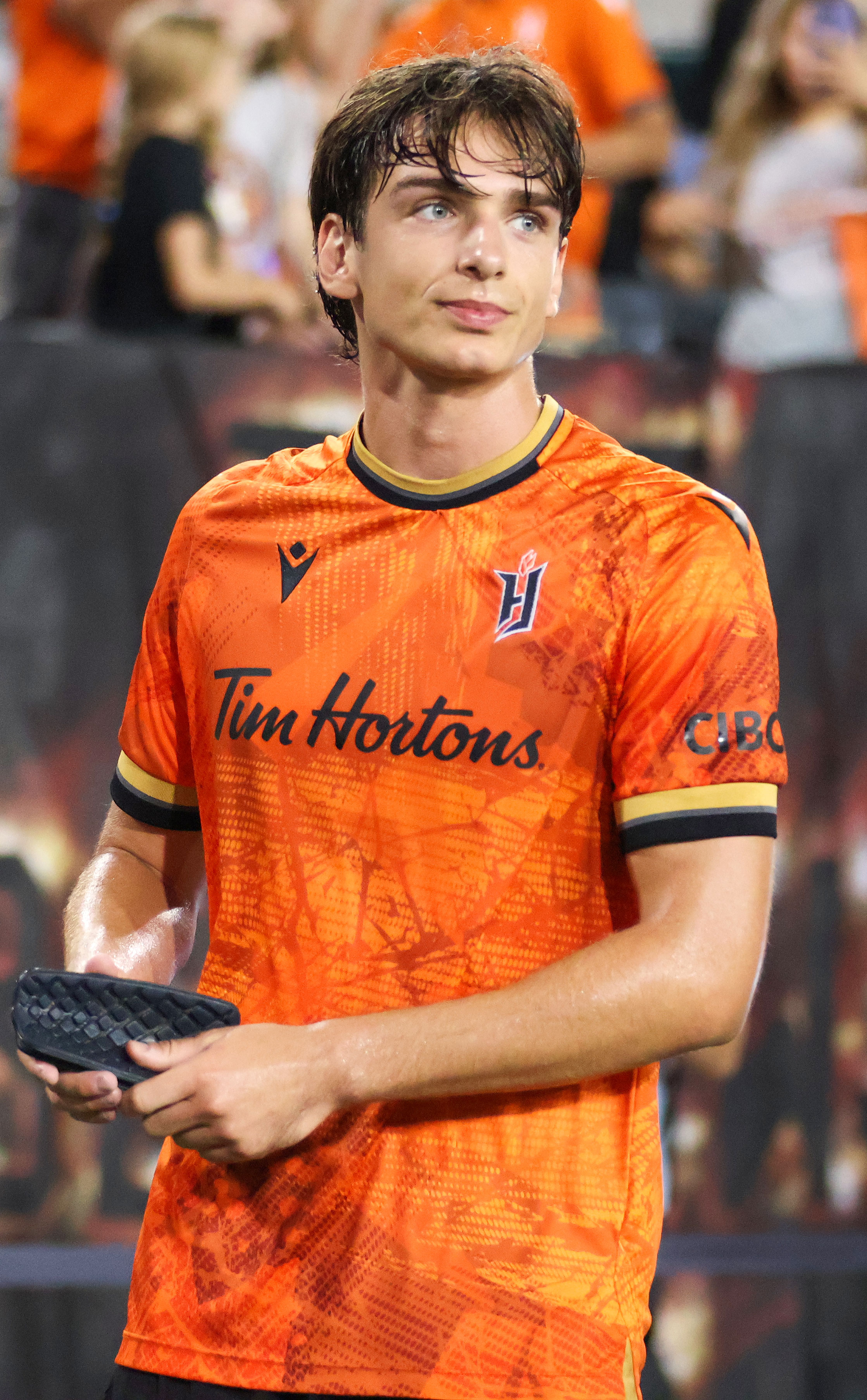
- Schiavoni with Forge FC in 2024

Personal information
- Full name: Matteo Claudio Schiavoni
- Date of birth: April 9, 2005 (age 21)
- Place of birth: Montréal, Québec, Canada
- Height: 6 ft 0 in (1.83 m)
- Position: Midfielder

Team information
- Current team: Pacific FC
- Number: 88

Youth career
- Lachine SC
- 2018–2022: CF Montréal
- 2022: → Bologna (loan)
- 2022–2023: Bologna

Senior career*
Years	Team	Apps	(Gls)
2022	CF Montréal U23	6	(0)
2024	CF Montréal	0	(0)
2024	→ Forge FC (loan)	14	(1)
2025–	Pacific FC	18	(0)
2026–	→ TSS FC Rovers (loan)	2	(1)

International career^{‡}
2024	Canada U20	2	(0)
- * Club domestic league appearances and goals as of October 27, 2026 ‡ National team caps and goals as of February 25, 2024

Matteo Claudio Schiavoni (born April 9, 2005) is a Canadian professional soccer player who plays as a midfielder for Canadian Premier League club Pacific FC.

== Early life ==
Schiavoni was born in Montréal. He began playing youth soccer with Lachine SC. In 2018, he played at the Quebec Games, where he was noticed by the CF Montréal Academy, who then signed him in 2019. In 2022, he attended pre-season camp with the CF Montréal first team. In March 2022, he was loaned to the youth side of Italian club Bologna to participate in the Torneo di Viareggio. In July 2022, he joined the Bologna academy on a permanent basis.

== Club career ==
In 2022, he played with CF Montréal U23 in the Première ligue de soccer du Québec.

After playing with Bologna's youth side in Italy, in March 2024, he signed a one-year contract with options for 2025 to 2027 with CF Montréal in Major League Soccer. He was then immediately sent on loan to Forge FC of the Canadian Premier League for the 2024 season. On August 18, 2024, he scored his first professional goal, scoring the winning goal in the 89th minute of a 2-1 victory over Vancouver FC. At the end of the season, Schiavoni's contract option would not be exercised, ending his time with the club.

On February 7, 2025, Schiavoni signed with Pacific FC on a two-year contract with an additional club option year.

== International career ==
Born in Canada, Schiavoni is of Italian descent and holds dual citizenship. In February 2024, he was named to the Canada U20 team for the 2024 CONCACAF U-20 Championship qualifying tournament.
