= Jassem Koleilat =

Czech footballer (born 1999)

Personal information
- Date of birth: 30 July 1999 (age 27)
- Place of birth: Prague, Czech Republic
- Height: 6 ft 2 in (1.88 m)
- Position: Goalkeeper

Team information
- Current team: Birmingham Legion FC
- Number: 1

Youth career
- –2016: Ultimate Goalkeeper Academy
- 2016–2018: Stade Lavallois
- 2018: Sparta Prague

College career
Years	Team	Apps	(Gls)
2019	Iowa Western Reivers	18	(0)
2021–2022	New Hampshire Wildcats	41	(0)

Senior career*
Years	Team	Apps	(Gls)
2017–2018	Stade Lavallois II	5	(0)
2022	Seacoast United Phantoms	10	(0)
2023	Los Angeles FC 2	7	(0)
2024–2025	Forge FC	41	(0)
2026–	Birmingham Legion FC	29	(0)
- * Club domestic league appearances and goals as of 23:38, 3 November 2026 (UTC)

Jassem Koleilat (born 30 July 1999) is a Czech professional footballer who plays as a goalkeeper for USL Championship club Birmingham Legion FC.

== Early life ==
Koleilat was born in Prague, Czech Republic to a Czech-Lebanese father, Aziz, and a Lebanese mother. They met in Lebanon, before moving to Montreal, Canada for six years, where his father attended McGill University. When he was two months old, Koleilat and his family relocated to Dubai, United Arab Emirates. In Dubai, he trained with the Ultimate Goalkeeper Academy.

In June 2016, he joined the youth system of French club Stade Lavallois. While part of the Laval academy, he made senior appearances for the club's reserve side, Stade Lavallois II, in the Championnat National 3 during the 2017–18 season.

In 2018, he moved to the youth system of Czech club Sparta Prague.

== College career ==
In 2019, Koleilat enrolled at Iowa Western Community College and played for the men's soccer team in the NJCAA. At the end of the season, he earned Second Team Academic honours and Second Team All-Region honours.

In 2021, he transferred to the University of New Hampshire to play NCAA Division I soccer. He made his NCAA debut on 26 August 2021 in a shutout victory over the Boston University Terriers. In September 2021, he was named the school's Student-Athlete of the Week, and in November he earned America East Conference Defensive Player of the Week honours. He was named to the America East All-Conference Second Team and the All-Northeast Region First Team at the conclusion of the season.

Ahead of the 2022 campaign, Koleilat was named to the MAC Hermann Trophy Watch List. In October 2022, he again received America East Defensive Player of the Week honours. After the season, he was named to the All-Northeast Region First Team and the All-America East Second Team for the second consecutive year. He also received the team's Most Dedicated Player Award.

== Club career ==
=== Early career ===
In 2022, Koleilat played for the Seacoast United Phantoms in USL League Two.

At the 2023 MLS SuperDraft, he was selected in the second round (58th overall) by Los Angeles FC. For the 2023 season, he signed with the club's MLS Next Pro affiliate, Los Angeles FC 2.

=== Forge FC ===
In February 2024, Koleilat joined Canadian Premier League club Forge FC on a short-term deal ahead of their CONCACAF Champions Cup matches. He had previously trained with the club before his senior year in college in 2022. In March 2024, Koleilat signed a multi-year deal with Forge.

He made his club debut on 11 May 2024, recording a clean sheet in a 0–0 league draw against Pacific FC. Throughout the season he formed a two-goalkeeper tandem with Christopher Kalongo, sharing starting duties. He helped Forge win the 2024 CPL Shield as regular-season champions, the first trophy of his professional career. After the season, the club exercised his option for 2025. At the end of the 2025 season, Koleilat won the Canadian Premier League Golden Glove award as the league's top goalkeeper.

=== Birmingham Legion FC ===
In February 2026, Koleilat signed with USL Championship club Birmingham Legion FC.

== Personal life ==
Koleilat holds Czech, Lebanese, and Canadian citizenship. He speaks English, Arabic, and French.

== Career statistics ==
As of match played 2 November 2025

Appearances and goals by club, season and competition
Club	Season	League			Playoffs		Domestic Cup		Continental		Total	
Club	Season	Division	Apps	Goals	Apps	Goals	Apps	Goals	Apps	Goals	Apps	Goals
Stade Lavallois II	2017–18	Championnat National 3	5	0	—		—		—		5	0
Seacoast United Phantoms	2022	USL League Two	10	0	2	0	—		—		12	0
Los Angeles FC 2	2023	MLS Next Pro	7	0	—		—		—		7	0
Forge FC	2024	Canadian Premier League	14	0	3	0	1	0	0	0	18	0
Forge FC	2025	Canadian Premier League	27	0	2	0	5	0	2	0	36	0
Forge FC	Total		41	0	5	0	6	0	2	0	53	0
Career total			63	0	7	0	6	0	2	0	78	0
