= Christopher Kalongo =

Canadian soccer player (born 2002)

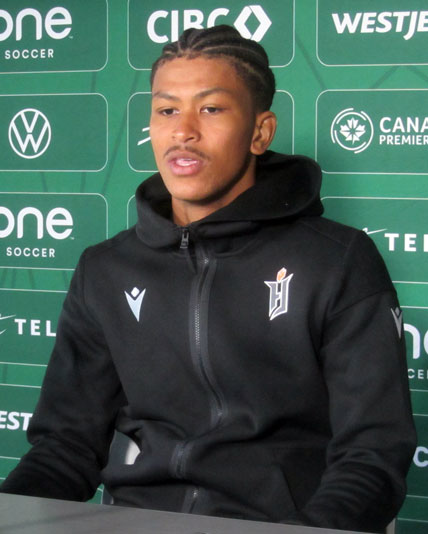
- Kalongo in 2024

Personal information
- Full name: Christopher Tinga Kalongo
- Date of birth: January 7, 2002 (age 24)
- Place of birth: Oakville, Ontario, Canada
- Height: 6 ft 0 in (1.83 m)
- Position: Goalkeeper

Team information
- Current team: Atlético Ottawa

Youth career
- Milton YSC
- Oakville SC
- Sigma FC

Senior career*
| Years | Team | Apps | (Gls) |
| 2021 | Sigma FC | 10 | (0) |
| 2021–2025 | Forge FC | 18 | (0) |
| 2025 | → Sigma FC (loan) | 7 | (0) |
| 2026 | Toronto FC II | 0 | (0) |
| 2026– | Atlético Ottawa | 17 | (0) |
- * Club domestic league appearances and goals as of October 18, 2026

Christopher Tinga Kalongo (born January 7, 2002) is a Canadian professional soccer player who plays as a goalkeeper for Atlético Ottawa in the Canadian Premier League.

== Early life ==
Kalongo was born in Canada to a South African mother and a Kenyan father. He played youth soccer with the Milton Youth SC. He later joined the youth system of Oakville SC and Sigma FC.

== Club career ==
In 2021, Kalongo played in League1 Ontario with Sigma FC.

In September 2021, he joined Forge FC of the Canadian Premier League on a developmental contract. In February 2022, he signed a standard contract with Forge. He made his debut on April 10, 2022, against Pacific FC. He won the CPL title with Forge in 2022. In March 2023, he re-signed with the club for another season. In October of the same year, he was a part of the Forge squad that won their fourth league title, following a 2–1 victory over Cavalry FC in the play-off final. In his first three seasons with the club, he made just three appearances, serving as the backup goalkeeper, however, after Triston Henry did not return to join the squad for the 2024 season, Kalongo began the 2024 season as the team's starting goalkeeper. He was named the Canadian Premier League Goalkeeper of the Month in April 2024. After the 2024 season, Forge picked up their option on Kalongo for the 2025 season.

In February 2026, Kalongo signed with Toronto FC II in MLS Next Pro for the 2026 season. In May 2026, he agreed to a mutual termination of his contract, after not having made any appearances for the club in their first 10 matches.

In May 2026, he returned to the Canadian Premier League, signing a one-year contract, with an option for an additional season with Atlético Ottawa.

== Personal life ==
In December 2024, Kalongo obtained his South African passport, with the goal of representing the South Africa national soccer team.

== Career statistics ==
As of May 19, 2026

| Club | Season | League | | | Playoffs | | Domestic Cup | | Continental | | Total | |
| Club | Season | Division | Apps | Goals | Apps | Goals | Apps | Goals | Apps | Goals | Apps | Goals |
|---|---|---|---|---|---|---|---|---|---|---|---|---|
| Sigma FC | 2021 | League1 Ontario | 10 | 0 | — | | — | | – | | 10 | 0 |
| Forge FC | 2021 | Canadian Premier League | 0 | 0 | 0 | 0 | 0 | 0 | 0 | 0 | 0 | 0 |
| Forge FC | 2022 | Canadian Premier League | 1 | 0 | 0 | 0 | 0 | 0 | 0 | 0 | 1 | 0 |
| Forge FC | 2023 | Canadian Premier League | 2 | 0 | 0 | 0 | 0 | 0 | – | | 2 | 0 |
| Forge FC | 2024 | Canadian Premier League | 14 | 0 | 0 | 0 | 4 | 0 | 2 | 0 | 20 | 0 |
| Forge FC | 2025 | Canadian Premier League | 1 | 0 | 0 | 0 | 0 | 0 | 0 | 0 | 1 | 0 |
| Forge FC | Total | | 18 | 0 | 0 | 0 | 4 | 0 | 2 | 0 | 24 | 0 |
| Sigma FC (loan) | 2025 | League1 Ontario Premier | 7 | 0 | — | | — | | – | | 7 | 0 |
| Toronto FC II | 2026 | MLS Next Pro | 0 | 0 | — | | — | | – | | 0 | 0 |
| Career total | | | 35 | 0 | 0 | 0 | 4 | 0 | 2 | 0 | 41 | 0 |

== Honours ==
Forge FC

- Canadian Premier League: 2022, 2023
- CPL Shield: 2021, 2024, 2025
