= Dominic Samuel (Canadian soccer) =

Canadian soccer player (born 1994)

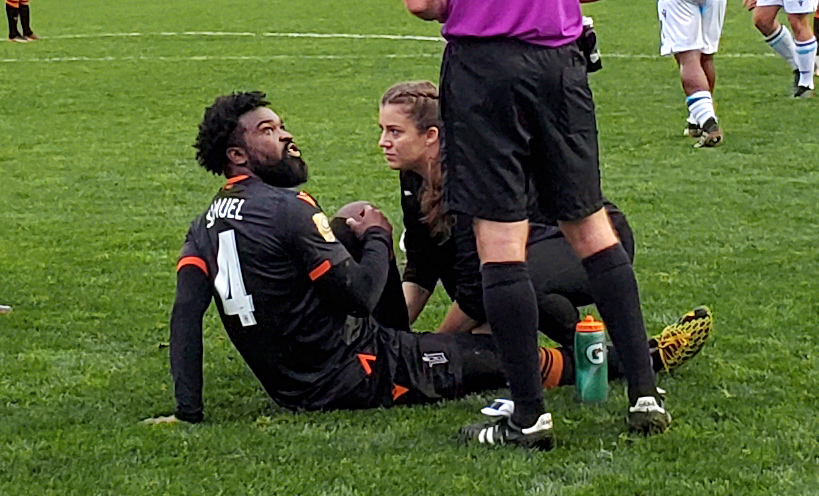
- Samuel with Forge FC in 2021

Personal information
- Full name: Dominic Edmund Samuel
- Date of birth: September 29, 1994 (age 32)
- Place of birth: Toronto, Ontario, Canada
- Height: 1.78 m (5 ft 10 in)
- Positions: Right-back; centre-back

Youth career
- 2004–2008: East York SC
- 2008–2012: Sigma FC

College career
Years	Team	Apps	(Gls)
2012–2015	Southern New Hampshire Penmen	87	(15)

Senior career*
Years	Team	Apps	(Gls)
2014	Seacoast United Phantoms	6	(0)
2015	Sigma FC		(2)
2016	Rochester Rhinos	26	(0)
2017–2018	Sigma FC	33	(3)
2019–2024	Forge FC	115	(0)
- * Club domestic league appearances and goals as of October 22, 2024

Dominic Edmund Samuel (born September 29, 1994) is a Canadian professional soccer player who plays as a defender.

== Early life ==
He began playing youth soccer with East York SC. Afterwards, he joined Sigma FC.

== College career ==
In 2012, he began attending Southern New Hampshire University, where he played for the men's soccer team. He scored his first collegiate goal on September 26, 2012, against the Saint Michael's Purple Knights. After his freshman season, he was named to the Northeast-10 Second Team and All-Rookie Team, as well as being a Daktronics Second Team All-Region. After his sophomore season, he was a NSCAA Second Team All-America selection, NSCAA First Team All-Region and Daktronics Second Team All-Region, Northeast-10 First Team All-Conference, and was named to the Northeast-10 and NCAA All-Championship teams. In 2014, he was a Northeast-10 First Team All-Conference Team and Northeast-10 All-Championship Team selection and was named to Daktronics Division II Conference Commissioners Association All-America Second Team. As a senior he was an NSCAA First-Team All-American, CCA First-Team All-American, CCA All-East Region First Team, and Northeast-10 Defender of the Year.

== Club career ==
In 2014, he played with the Seacoast United Phantoms in the Premier Development League.

In 2015, he played in League1 Ontario with Sigma FC. He was named the league Defender of the Year that season, as well as being named a league First-Team All-Star.

After college, Samuel trialed with Major League Soccer club New England Revolution, but ultimately did not sign with the club He instead joined the Rochester Rhinos in the American second-tier United Soccer League.

In 2017, he returned to Sigma FC, playing with them for two seasons. In 2018, he was named the league Defender of the Year for the second time, as well as a First-Team All-Star. Over his two seasons, he scored three goals in 33 regular season appearances. While with Sigma, Samuel worked 10 hour weekday shifts in a lumberyard, before heading to trainings, and five hour shifts on weekend gamedays. In 2020, he was named to the All-Time League1 Ontario Best XI.

In February 2019, Samuel signed with Canadian Premier League side Forge FC. In February 2021, the club picked up his club option for the 2021 season. He led the team in blocks and aerial duels won in 2021. In January 2022, he re-signed with the club on a new multi-year contract. In October 2023, Samuel helped Forge win their fourth league title, following a 2–1 win over Cavalry FC in the play-off final. After the 2024 season, he departed the club.

== International career ==
In April 2011, Samuel attended his first Canada national team camp with the under-17 team.

== Career statistics ==
As of November 9, 2024

Club	Season	League			Playoffs		Domestic Cup		League Cup		Continental		Total	
Club	Season	Division	Apps	Goals	Apps	Goals	Apps	Goals	Apps	Goals	Apps	Goals	Apps	Goals
Seacoast United Phantoms	2014	PDL	6	0	?	0	—		—		—		6	0
Sigma FC	2015	League1 Ontario	?	2	—		—		3	0	—		3+	2
Rochester Rhinos	2016	USL	26	0	2	0	1	0	—		—		29	0
Sigma FC	2017	League1 Ontario	17	2	—		—		1	0	—		18	2
Sigma FC	2018	League1 Ontario	16	1	1	0	—		3	0	—		20	1
Sigma FC	Total		33	3	1	0	0	0	4	0	0	0	38	3
Forge FC	2019	Canadian Premier League	25	0	1	0	2	0	—		4	0	32	0
Forge FC	2020	Canadian Premier League	9	0	1	0	—		—		4	0	14	0
Forge FC	2021	Canadian Premier League	26	0	2	0	2	0	—		7	0	37	0
Forge FC	2022	Canadian Premier League	18	0	3	0	1	0	—		2	0	24	0
Forge FC	2023	Canadian Premier League	19	0	2	0	3	0	—		—		24	0
Forge FC	2024	Canadian Premier League	18	0	3	0	5	0	—		2	0	28	0
Forge FC	Total		115	0	12	0	13	0	0	0	19	0	159	0
Career total			180	5	15	0	14	0	7	0	19	0	235	5

== Honours ==
Club

Forge FC

- Canadian Premier League: 2019, 2020, 2022, 2023

Individual

- League1 Ontario Defender of the Year: 2015, 2018
- League1 Ontario First-Team All-Star: 2015, 2018
