= 2023 Canadian Premier League final =

Soccer match

- Event: 2023 Canadian Premier League season
Forge FC	Cavalry FC
2	1
- After extra time
- Date: October 28, 2023
- Venue: Tim Hortons Field, Hamilton, Ontario
- Man of the Match: Béni Badibanga (Forge FC)
- Referee: Marie-Soleil Beaudoin
- Attendance: 13,925
- Weather: Mostly cloudy 9 °C (48 °F); 62% humidity

The 2023 Canadian Premier League final was the soccer match to determine the winner of the 2023 Canadian Premier League season. It was played October 28, 2023, in Hamilton, Ontario, between Forge FC and Cavalry FC. The match was the fifth edition of the CPL Finals, the post-season championship of the Canadian Premier League, the top level of Canadian soccer. Forge were the defending champions, having won the 2022 Canadian Premier League final.

Forge defeated Cavalry 2–1 in extra time to capture their fourth title. Cavalry opened the scoring in the 101st minute from a curling strike by Ali Musse before Forge's Béni Badibanga quickly scored an equalizer. Tristan Borges then scored a goal directly from a corner for Forge in the 111th minute that held up as the match winner to secure the championship.

== Path to the final ==
The 2023 CPL season was contested by eight teams. Each team played four games against each of the seven opponents for a total of 28 matches. The top-five teams from the regular season qualified for the playoffs which began on October 11, 2023. The playoffs featured a new Page playoff format where teams entered in different rounds depending on their finishing position. All matches in the playoffs were played as a single leg.

Regular season standings
Pos	Team	Pld	W	D	L	GF	GA	GD	Pts	Playoff qualification
1	Cavalry (S)	28	16	7	5	46	27	+19	55	First semifinal
2	Forge (C)	28	11	9	8	39	32	+7	42 (Note: Tie resolved by away goal differential; Forge: +4, Wanderers: −2)	First semifinal
3	HFX Wanderers	28	11	9	8	39	32	+7	42	Quarterfinal
4	Pacific	28	11	7	10	42	35	+7	40	Play-in round
5	York United	28	11	5	12	35	44	−9	38	Play-in round

Source: CanPL
Rules for classification: 1) Points; 2) Total wins; 3) Goal difference; 4) Goals scored; 5) Away goal differential; 6) Away goals scored; 7) Home goal differential; 8) Home goals scored; 9) Total minutes played by U-21 players; 10) Coin toss (2 teams tied) or drawing of lots (3+ teams tied).
(C) Champion (qualified to Champions Cup); (S) CPL Shield winner (qualified to Champions Cup)
Notes:

Playoffs
Forge FC		Round	Cavalry FC	
Opponent	Result	Round	Opponent	Result
Bye		Play-in round	Bye	
Bye		Quarterfinal	Bye	
Cavalry FC	2–1	First semifinal	Forge FC	1–2
Bye		Second semifinal	Pacific FC	2–1

=== Forge FC ===
Forge FC qualified for the playoffs on September 23. They finished the season in 2nd place with a record of 11 wins, 9 draws, and 8 losses and qualified directly to the first semifinal as one of the top-two teams. In the semifinal they defeated their rivals Cavalry FC to advance to a record extending fifth consecutive CPL Final. Forge had a record of three wins and one loss in CPL Finals.

=== Cavalry FC ===
Cavalry were the first team to clinch a spot in the playoffs, which they did on September 12. They captured the CPL Shield, finishing first in the regular season by a 13 point margin. This was Cavalry's second CPL Final, having lost their only other appearance to Forge FC in 2019.

=== Head-to-head ===
The 2023 CPL final was the sixth meeting of the season between these two teams and the twenty-sixth overall. Cavalry had the advantage in the regular season against Forge, leading the head-to-head with one win and three draws and finishing 13 points ahead in the standings.

As the top-two teams in regular season, Cavalry hosted Forge in the first semifinal which was a non-elimination game. Forge won the game and earned the right to host the CPL final while Cavalry qualified to the second semifinal as losers. The match was the 23rd of 25 games between the teams that was decided by one goal or fewer.

== Venue ==
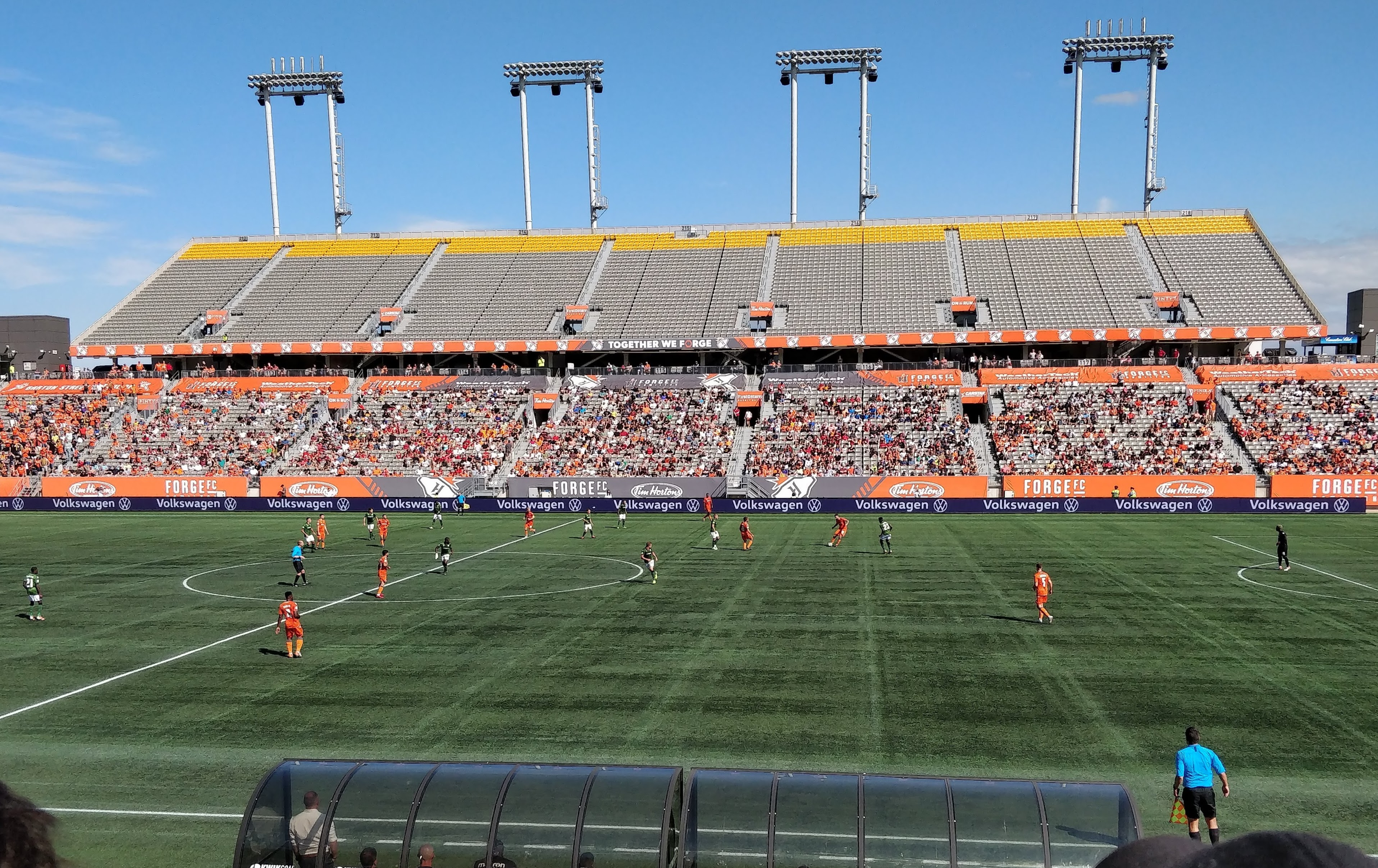
A 2019 match between Forge FC and Cavalry FC at Tim Hortons Field in Hamilton, Ontario

Tim Hortons Field, home of Forge FC was the host stadium for the final. This was its third time hosting the CPL final, following 2019 (leg 1) and 2021. The stadium also notably hosted the inaugural CPL match in 2019, and the Canadian Championship final in 2022, with both matches drawing large attendance. For the 2023 CPL final, attendance was expected to be high once again; The Hamilton Spectator reported that over 10,000 tickets had been sold by October 25.

Tim Hortons Field opened in 2014 and was built as a replacement for Ivor Wynne Stadium which was located on the same grounds. The 24,000 seat multi-purpose stadium is also home to the Hamilton Tiger-Cats of the Canadian Football League. The venue is scheduled to host the 110th Grey Cup on November 19, three weeks after the CPL final.

== Pre-match ==
On October 26, the Canadian Premier League Awards took place at LIUNA Station in Hamilton. Cavalry dominated the awards; Tommy Wheeldon Jr. won Coach of the Year, Ali Musse won Player's Player of the Year, and Daan Klomp won both Defender of the Year and Player of the Year. Forge's sole award winner was Triston Henry who was named the Golden Glove winner. The CPL also unveiled the North Star Cup, the new trophy that replaced the North Star Shield awarded to the CPL champion.

Forge had ruled out forward Woobens Pacius before the final due to injury while Cavalry were expected to have their full roster available for selection.

== Match ==
=== Summary ===
==== First half ====
The final was played in front of a crowd of 13,925 fans at Tim Hortons Field. The match kicked-off at 6 pm local time, just before sunset in Hamilton. Forge took the initiative to open the match, pinning Cavalry in its own half for stretches of time. Cavalry nearly opened the scoring late in the half from a shot from distance by Fraser Aird. The half ended scoreless despite several set piece opportunities for Cavalry.

==== Second half ====
While Forge seemed to have momentum, Cavalry generated more scoring chances. Myer Bevan, Ali Musse, and Jesse Daley all had chances to open the scoring for Cavalry, but none could beat Forge goalkeeper Triston Henry. Forge's Béni Badibanga thought he had scored after chipping the ball over Cavalry keeper Marco Carducci and into the net, but the goal was called back due to a foul. Musse had another good chance denied by Henry with ten minutes remaining in the half. The match was scoreless after 90 minutes, forcing it into extra time.

==== Extra time ====
Musse broke the deadlock in the 11th minute of extra time to give Cavalry a 1–0 lead; Bevan won the ball in Forge's penalty area before passing it to Daley who setup Musse for his strike. However, Forge quickly equalized when Badibanga took a short corner from Kyle Bekker and fired a long-range shot into the top corner of Cavalry's goal.

In the 21st minute of extra time, Forge substitute Tristan Borges fired a left-footed corner kick directly into Cavalry's goal past Carducci for an olimpico goal that stood up as the match winner.

=== Details ===
October 28, 2023
6:00 pm ET

Forge FC	2–1 (a.e.t.)	Cavalry FC
Badibanga 105+2'; Borges 111'	Recap; Report	Musse 101'

Tim Hortons Field, Hamilton, Ontario
Attendance: 13,925
Referee: Marie-Soleil Beaudoin

Forge	Cavalry

GK	1	(Canada) Triston Henry	(yellow card) 120+4'
CB	24	(Haiti) Garven Metusala
CB	13	(Sweden) Alexander Achinioti-Jönsson
CB	5	(Canada) Manjrekar James	(yellow card) 14'
RM	24	(Albania) Rezart Rama		(substituted off) 118'
CM	21	(Canada) Alessandro Hojabrpour		(substituted off) 105'
CM	10	(Canada) Kyle Bekker (c)
LM	20	(Canada) Kwasi Poku		(substituted off) 46'
AM	22	(Canada) Noah Jensen		(substituted off) 68'
CF	39	(Belgium) Béni Badibanga		(substituted off) 118'
CF	9	(Canada) Terran Campbell		(substituted off) 103'
Substitutes:
GK	29	(Canada) Christopher Kalongo
DF	4	(Canada) Dominic Samuel	(yellow card) 105'	(substituted on) 46'
FW	7	(Canada) David Choinière		(substituted on) 103'
FW	9	(Canada) Jordan Hamilton		(substituted on) 105'
FW	19	(Canada) Tristan Borges	(yellow card) 105+5'	(substituted on) 68'
MF	33	(Mali) Aboubacar Sissoko		(substituted on) 118'
DF	81	(England) Malik Owolabi-Belewu		(substituted on) 118'
Manager: (Canada) Bobby Smyrniotis
Assistant coach: (Canada) David Edgar			(red card) 77'

GK	1	(Canada) Marco Carducci (c)
RB	33	(Canada) Fraser Aird
CB	24	(Canada) Eryk Kobza
CB	4	(Netherlands) Daan Klomp
LB	5	(France) Bradley Kamdem	(yellow card) 105+5'	(substituted off) 115'
CM	8	(Australia) Jesse Daley	(yellow card) 57'	(substituted off) 112'
CM	6	(Canada) Charlie Trafford	(yellow card) 72'
RW	7	(Somalia) Ali Musse		(substituted off) 105+6'
AM	10	(Canada) Sergio Camargo	(yellow card) 30'	(substituted off) 73'
LW	19	(South Sudan) William Akio		(substituted off) 115'
CF	9	(New Zealand) Myer Bevan	(yellow card) 40'
Substitutes:
GK	21	(Canada) Sterling Kerr
DF	3	(Canada) Callum Montgomery		(substituted on) 105+6'
MF	17	(Canada) Ben Fisk		(substituted on) 115'
MF	18	(Canada) Maël Henry		(substituted on) 112'
FW	20	(Republic of Ireland) Joe Mason		(substituted on) 115'
FW	23	(Canada) Gareth Smith-Doyle
MF	26	(Canada) Shamit Shome		(substituted on) 73'
Manager: (England) Tommy Wheeldon Jr.

Player of the Match:
Béni Badibanga (Forge FC)

Assistant referees:
Peter Pendli
Gérard-Kader Lebuis
Fourth official:
Scott Bowman

Match rules

- 90 minutes
- 30 minutes of extra time if necessary
- Penalty shoot-out if score still level
- Maximum of five substitutions, with a sixth allowed in extra time

=== Statistics ===
Overall
Statistic	Forge FC	Cavalry FC
Goals scored	2	1
Total shots	17	21
Shots on target	4	5
Blocked shots	6	4
Ball possession	43%	57%
Passes	442	567
Corner kicks	5	3
Fouls conceded	19	17
Offsides	2	1
Yellow cards	4	5
Red cards	0	0

== Post-match ==
With their win, Forge FC earned their record-extending fourth CPL championship – all within a five year span. This final was the first where a team came from behind to win and the first where a team captured the title at home. Cavalry FC remained winless in CPL finals, with their only other appearance to date being a defeat to Forge in 2019. For the fourth straight year (excluding the shortened 2020 season), the regular season winner failed to achieve the double by winning the CPL championship, losing in the finals on all four occasions.

Forge and Cavalry qualified to the newly expanded 2024 CONCACAF Champions Cup as champions and regular season winners respectively. Had Cavalry won the final, Forge would have still qualified as regular season runners-up. Forge returned to the competition after having most recently competed in 2022 while Cavalry made their international debut. Both Forge and Cavalry bowed out in round one of the competition, losing to Guadalajara and Orlando City SC respectively.

== See also ==
- Canadian Premier League Finals
- 2023 Canadian Championship final
