= 2026 Forge FC season =

Forge FC 2026 soccer season

Forge FC
2026 season
- Chairman: Bob Young
- Head coach: Bobby Smyrniotis
- Stadium: Hamilton Stadium
- Canadian Premier League: 2nd
- CPL playoffs: Semifinals
- Canadian Championship: Winners
- CONCACAF Champions Cup: Round one
- Top goalscorer: League: Ismael Oketokoun (5); All: Antoine Batisse; Brian Wright (7 each)
- Highest home attendance: 15,122 vs. FC Supra du Québec (May 13, CPL)
- Lowest home attendance: 2,619 vs. Pacific FC (October 7, CPL)
- Average home league attendance: 5,126
- Biggest win: 5–0 vs. Inter Toronto FC (Home, October 12, CPL)
- Biggest defeat: 1–4 vs. Tigres UANL (Away, February 10, CCC)
Home colours	Away colours	Third colours

The 2026 Forge FC season was the eighth season in the history of Forge FC and the club's eighth season in the Canadian Premier League (CPL), the top flight in Canadian soccer. Forge entered the season as two-time defending CPL Shield winners, having finished first in the 2024 and 2025 CPL seasons.

On October 21, Forge won its first Canadian Championship, defeating CF Montréal in the final. In the CPL, Forge finished the season as runner-up to Cavalry FC for the CPL Shield. In the playoffs, the Hammers fell to Atlético Ottawa in the semifinals. The club also played in the CONCACAF Champions Cup, facing Liga MX side Tigres UANL in the first round.

== Review ==
=== Background ===
Forge FC entered the 2026 Canadian Premier League season as the two-time reigning regular season winners after having finished first and claiming the CPL Shield in both the 2024 and 2025 CPL seasons. The 2025 shield was the club's third regular season title and seventh trophy in seven years. In the CPL playoffs, Forge were eliminated in the semifinals, making the 2025 CPL final the first in league history not to feature Forge.

The Hammers are also competing in the 2026 Canadian Championship, a domestic cup organized by the Canadian Soccer Association. In the 2025 edition, Forge advanced to the semifinal, defeating MLS side CF Montréal in the quarterfinal for the second year in a row, before being knocked out by the eventual champion Vancouver Whitecaps FC.

Forge qualified for the 2026 CONCACAF Champions Cup as 2025 CPL regular season winners. This was Forge's fourth appearance in the competition and third appearance in a row. In the 2025 edition, Forge faced Mexican side Monterrey in round one, losing 5–0 on aggregate.

Head coach and sporting director Bobby Smyrniotis returned for his eighth season with the club after signing a four-year contract extension in 2023.

=== Preseason ===
Forge reported that it had opened its preseason in Hamilton with medicals on January 12 before starting training the next day. The club was then scheduled to travel to Cancun for two weeks of training and to play friendlies against Liga Premier club Inter Playa del Carmen and MLS club Orlando City SC.

== Squad ==
As of November 9, 2026

No.	Player	Nationality	Position	Date of birth (age)	Previous club	Notes
Goalkeepers
16	Dimitry Bertaud	(Democratic Republic of the Congo)	GK	June 6, 1998 (age 28)	(France) Montpellier HSC	INT
33	Cuba Grant	(Canada)	GK	July 13, 2002 (age 24)	(United States) Indiana Tech Warriors	
36	Dino Bontis	(Canada)	GK	August 3, 2004 (age 22)	(Canada) Western Mustangs	
Defenders
3	Marko Jevremović	(Serbia)	DF	February 23, 1996 (age 30)	(Greece) Athens Kallithea F.C.	INT
4	Daniël Krutzen	(Belgium)	DF	September 19, 1996 (age 30)	(United States) Phoenix Rising FC	
5	Daniel Nimick	(Canada)	DF	September 22, 2000 (age 26)	(Canada) HFX Wanderers FC	
8	Antoine Batisse	(France)	DF	January 13, 1995 (age 31)	(Serbia) FK IMT	INT
24	Rezart Rama	(Albania)	DF	December 4, 2000 (age 25)	(Albania) KF Egnatia	INT
32	Zayne Bruno	(Canada)	DF	January 23, 2007 (age 19)	(Canada) Sigma FC	U21, EYT
55	Manjrekar James	(Canada)	DF	August 5, 1993 (age 33)	(New Zealand) Wellington Phoenix	
Midfielders
6	Ben Paton	(Canada)	MF	May 5, 2000 (age 26)	(Scotland) Ross County	
22	Noah Jensen	(Canada)	MF	July 20, 1999 (age 27)	(United States) Oakland University	
23	Anthony Aromatario	(Canada)	MF	April 30, 2003 (age 23)	(Canada) Woodbridge Strikers	
26	Aghilas Sadek	(Canada)	MF	June 15, 2008 (age 18)	(Canada) CF Montréal Academy	U21, EYT
28	Keito Lipovschek	(Canada)	MF	April 3, 2005 (age 21)	(United Arab Emirates) Fleetwood United	U21
87	Maxime Bourgeois	(Canada)	MF	July 4, 2002 (age 24)	(Canada) Sherbrooke	U Sports
Forwards
7	Ismael Oketokoun	(Spain)	FW	April 8, 2006 (age 20)	(Spain) CF Platges de Calvià	INT
9	Brian Wright	(Canada)	FW	March 24, 1995 (age 31)	(Canada) York United FC	
11	Nana Opoku Ampomah	(Ghana)	FW	January 2, 1996 (age 30)	(Germany) Fortuna Düsseldorf	INT
12	Maxime Filion	(Canada)	FW	April 13, 2003 (age 23)	(Canada) Montreal Carabins	
14	Levonte Johnson	(Canada)	FW	March 15, 1999 (age 27)	(United States) Colorado Springs Switchbacks	
17	Hoce Massunda	(Canada)	FW	June 19, 2005 (age 21)	(Canada) Sigma FC	U21
18	Molham Babouli	(Syria)	FW	January 2, 1993 (age 33)	(Canada) York United FC	
19	Tristan Borges	(Canada)	FW	August 26, 1998 (age 28)	(Belgium) OH Leuven	
20	Kevaughn Tavernier	(Canada)	FW	February 24, 2006 (age 20)	(Canada) Sigma FC	U21
90	Lucas Cavallini	(Canada)	FW	December 28, 1992 (age 33)	(Mexico) Puebla	

=== Inactive list ===
The following players ended the season on the club's inactive list.

No.	Name	Nationality	Position(s)	Date of birth (age)	Previous club
10	Kyle Bekker	(Canada)	MF	September 2, 1990 (age 36)	(United States) North Carolina FC
64	Khadim Kane	(Canada)	MF	May 17, 2005 (age 21)	(Canada) CF Montréal U23

== Contracts and transfers ==
=== New contracts ===
No.	Pos.	Player	Contract details	Date	Source
11	FW	(Ghana) Nana Ampomah	Multi-year contract (length undisclosed)	December 22, 2025	
20	FW	(Canada) Kevaughn Tavernier	Undisclosed	January 30, 2026	
23	MF	(Canada) Anthony Aromatario	U Sports contract	March 13, 2026	
23	MF	(Canada) Anthony Aromatario	Multi-year contract (length undisclosed)	April 3, 2026	
12	FW	(Canada) Maxime Filion	U Sports contract	April 3, 2026	
87	MF	(Canada) Maxime Bourgeois	U Sports contract	April 3, 2026	
12	FW	(Canada) Maxime Filion	Multi-year contract (length undisclosed)	April 4, 2026	
87	MF	(Canada) Maxime Bourgeois	Multi-year contract (length undisclosed) beginning in 2027	April 4, 2026	

=== In ===
==== Transferred in ====
No.	Pos.	Player	From club	Fee/notes	Date	Source
4	DF	(Belgium) Daniël Krutzen	(United States) Phoenix Rising FC	Free	December 23, 2025	
7	FW	(Spain) Ismael Oketokoun	(Spain) CF Platges de Calvià	Free	January 8, 2026	
23	MF	(Canada) Anthony Aromatario	(Canada) York Lions	Short-term replacement contract	January 30, 2026	
30	GK	(Germany) Sjard Strauss	(Canada) Mount Royal Cougars	Short-term replacement contract	January 30, 2026	
8	DF	(France) Antoine Batisse	(Serbia) FK IMT	Free	January 31, 2026	
16	GK	(Democratic Republic of the Congo) Dimitry Bertaud	(France) Montpellier HSC	Free	February 1, 2026	
15	DF	(Canada) Noah Bickford	(Canada) TMU	Short-term contract	February 2, 2026	
87	MF	(Canada) Maxime Bourgeois	(Canada) Sherbrooke	Short-term contract	February 2, 2026	
12	FW	(Canada) Maxime Filion	(Canada) Montreal Carabins	Short-term contract	February 2, 2026	
26	MF	(Canada) Aghilas Sadek	(Canada) CF Montréal Academy	Exceptional Young Talent contract	April 2, 2026	
	MF	(Haiti) Woodensky Pierre	(Haiti) Violette AC	Free	August 27, 2026	
55	DF	(Canada) Manjrekar James	(New Zealand) Wellington Phoenix	Free	September 11, 2026	
90	FW	(Canada) Lucas Cavallini	(Mexico) Puebla	Free	September 18, 2026	
33	GK	(Canada) Cuba Grant	(United States) Indiana Tech Warriors	Short-term replacement contract until October 17	September 24, 2026	

==== Loaned in ====
No.	Pos.	Player	From club	Fee/notes	Date	Source
14	FW	(Canada) Levonte Johnson	(United States) Colorado Springs Switchbacks	On loan until November 30, 2026	July 29, 2026	

==== Draft picks ====
Forge FC made two selections in the 2026 CPL–U Sports Draft on November 28, 2025. Draft picks are not automatically signed to the team roster; only those who are signed to a contract will be listed as transfers in.

Round	Selection	Pos.	Player	Nationality	University
1	8	DF	Noah Bickford	Canada	TMU
2	15	MF	Maxime Bourgeois	Canada	Sherbrooke

=== Out ===
No.	Pos.	Player	To club	Fee/notes	Date	Source
81	DF	(England) Malik Owolabi-Belewu	(England) Chesterfield F.C.	Contract expired	December 31, 2025	
7	FW	(Canada) David Choinière	(Canada) FC Supra	Contract expired	December 31, 2025	
27	FW	(Belgium) Victor Klonaridis	(Greece) Aris Petroupolis F.C.	Contract expired	December 31, 2025	
39	FW	(Belgium) Béni Badibanga	(Canada) Inter Toronto FC	Contract expired	December 31, 2025	
1	GK	(Czech Republic) Jassem Koleilat	(United States) Birmingham Legion FC	Contract expired	December 31, 2025	
23	MF	(Canada) Harry Paton	(Canada) Cavalry FC	Contract expired	December 31, 2025	
29	GK	(Canada) Christopher Kalongo	(United States) Toronto FC II	Contract expired	December 31, 2025	
8	MF	(Senegal) Elimane Cissé	(Senegal) Teungueth FC	Contract expired	December 31, 2025	
13	MF	(Sweden) Alexander Achinioti-Jonsson	(Norway) Raufoss IL	Contract expired	December 31, 2025	
21	MF	(Canada) Alessandro Hojabrpour	(Netherlands) FC Emmen	Undisclosed	January 20, 2026 (Note: FC Emmen announced the transfer on January 20, 2026, while Forge FC announced the transfer on January 21, 2026.)	
99	MF	(Greece) Christos Liatifis	(Greece) Saronikos Anavyssos	Mutual contract termination	January 24, 2026 (Note: Saronikos Anavyssos announced it had signed Liatifis on January 24, 2026, while Forge FC announced his departure from the club on January 30, 2026.)	

== Club ==
Prior to the season, the Hamilton Sports Group welcomed businessman and investor Angelo Paletta as a minority owner.

=== Kits ===
In November 2025, Canadian Soccer Business announced a multi-year partnership with Hummel to be the CPL's new kit and apparel partner starting with the 2026 season, replacing Macron. In December, the league announced Moneris as the new sleeve sponsor for every CPL club.

On January 6, Forge unveiled a black and orange third kit that pays homage to the defunct Hamilton Steelers (1981–1992) and made available only to the club's season seat members. Later in the month, Forge unveiled its new orange primary kit and dark gray alternate kit.

== Competitions ==
Matches are listed in Hamilton local time: Eastern Daylight Time (UTC−4) from March 8 until November 1, and Eastern Standard Time (UTC−5) otherwise.

=== Overview ===
Competition	First match	Last match	Starting round	Final position	Record							
Competition	First match	Last match	Starting round	Final position	Pld	W	D	L	GF	GA	GD	Win %
Canadian Premier League	April 4	October 25	Matchday 1	2nd	28	17	7	4	49	22	+27	60.71
CPL Playoffs	November 1	November 7	Semifinals	Semifinals	2	0	1	1	4	5	−1	0.00
Canadian Championship	May 9	October 21	Preliminary round	Winners	6	3	3	0	10	4	+6	50.00
CONCACAF Champions Cup	February 3	February 10	Round one	Round one	2	0	1	1	1	4	−3	0.00
Total					38	20	12	6	64	35	+29	52.63

Last updated: November 7, 2026
Source: Competitions

=== Canadian Premier League ===
==== Regular season ====
===== Table =====
Pos	Team	Pld	W	D	L	GF	GA	GD	Pts	Qualification
1	Cavalry FC (S)	28	18	6	4	58	23	+35	60	Playoffs and 2027 CONCACAF Champions Cup
2	Forge FC (V)	28	17	7	4	49	22	+27	58	Playoffs and 2027 CONCACAF Champions Cup (Note: As winners of Canadian Championship)
3	Atlético Ottawa	28	13	4	11	42	45	−3	43	Playoffs and 2027 CONCACAF Champions Cup (Note: As either winners of the CPL Shield or the highest-ranked team not already qualified)
4	Supra du Québec	28	11	5	12	47	50	−3	38	Playoffs
5	Vancouver FC	28	10	7	11	39	37	+2	37	
6	Inter Toronto	28	7	9	12	42	65	−23	30	
7	HFX Wanderers	28	7	7	14	44	50	−6	28	
8	Pacific FC	28	2	9	17	33	62	−29	15	

Source: CPL
Rules for classification: 1) Points; 2) Total wins; 3) Head-to-head; 4) Goal differential; 5) Goals for; 6) Away goal differential; 7) Away goals for; 8) Home goal differential; 9) Home goals for; 10) Fewest disciplinary points; 11) Most under-21 domestic player minutes; 12) Drawing of lots.
(S) CPL Shield winner; (V) Canadian Championship winners

===== Results by match =====
Match	1	2	3	4	5	6	7	8	9	10	11	12	14	15	16	17	18	19	20	21	22	23	24	25	13^{1}	26	27	28
Result	W	W	D	W	W	W	L	W	W	W	W	W	W	D	L	L	W	W	L	D	W	D	D	D	W	W	W	D
Position	1	2	2	1	1	1	2	1	1	1	1	1	1	1	1	2	1	1	2	2	2	2	2	2	2	2	2	2

Source: #Matches
W = Win; D = Draw; L = Loss

^{1} Matchday 13 (vs Pacific FC) was postponed due to poor air quality and later rescheduled to October 7.

===== Matches =====
The Canadian Premier League announced its schedule on February 2. The schedule included a pause starting June 11 for the 2026 FIFA World Cup before resuming on June 26.

April 4 1	Forge FC	2–0	Atlético Ottawa	Hamilton, Ontario
12:00 pm	Wright 21' (pen.); Paton 68'; Aromatario (yellow card) 73'	Report	Castro (yellow card) 56'; Aparicio (yellow card) 61'; Walker (yellow card) 65'	Stadium: Hamilton Stadium; Attendance: 5,534; Referee: Yusri Rudolf
Note: Kick-off was rescheduled from 4:00 pm.

April 12 2	Vancouver FC	0–1	Forge FC	Langley, British Columbia
7:00 pm	Pecile (yellow card) 78'; Campagna (yellow card) 81'	Report	Oketokoun (yellow card) 59'; Aromatario (yellow card) 74'; Fillion 90'	Stadium: Willoughby Community Park; Attendance: 1,908; Referee: Renzo Villanueva

April 18 3	Forge FC	0–0	Cavalry FC	Hamilton, Ontario
4:00 pm	Nimick (yellow card) 9'; Rama (yellow card) 34' (yellow-red card) 56'	Report	Didić (yellow card) 15'; Kobza (yellow card) 90+3'	Stadium: Hamilton Stadium; Attendance: 4,178; Referee: Scott Bowman

April 26 4	Pacific FC	0–1	Forge FC	Victoria, British Columbia
6:00 pm	Gomulka (yellow card) 73'; Greco-Taylor (yellow card) 90+4'	Report	Wright 76'	Stadium: Royal Athletic Park; Attendance: 3,383; Referee: Mario Alayass

May 2 5	HFX Wanderers FC	1–3	Forge FC	Halifax, Nova Scotia
2:00 pm	Godinho (yellow card) 30'; Johnston 58' (pen.); Alphonse (yellow card) 63'; Kachwele (yellow card) 73'	Report	Wright 24'; Massunda (yellow card) 45', (goal) 68'; Batisse 51'	Stadium: Wanderers Grounds; Attendance: 6,044; Referee: Roberto D'Alesio

May 13 6	Forge FC	1–0	FC Supra	Hamilton, Ontario
11:00 am	Nimick 56'; Rama (yellow card) 90+1'	Report	Abzi (yellow card) 85'	Stadium: Hamilton Stadium; Attendance: 15,122; Referee: Sebastian Noshinravani

May 24 7	Atlético Ottawa	2–1	Forge FC	Ottawa, Ontario
2:00 pm	Aparicio (yellow card) 43'; Abatneh 67'; Coulanges 87'	Report	Aromatario (yellow card) 56'; Oketokoun 84'	Stadium: TD Place Stadium; Attendance: 3,591; Referee: Fabrizio Stasolla

May 31 8	Forge FC	1–0	Cavalry FC	Hamilton, Ontario
4:00 pm	Aromatario (yellow card) 5'; Batisse 70'	Report	Kobza (yellow card) 29'; Ingham (yellow card) 78'; Ntignee (yellow card) 86'	Stadium: Hamilton Stadium; Attendance: 6,101; Referee: Renzo Villanueva

June 7 9	Inter Toronto FC	1–4	Forge FC	Toronto, Ontario
2:00 pm	Córdova (yellow card) 32'; Ferrari 47'; López (yellow card) 74'	Report	Jevremović 17'; Massunda 26'; Borges 50'; Babouli (yellow card) 53'; Paton 70'	Stadium: York Lions Stadium; Attendance: 3,154; Referee: Mario Alayass

June 10 10	Forge FC	1–0	HFX Wanderers FC	Hamilton, Ontario
7:00 pm	Wright 57', (yellow card) 58'; Aromatario (yellow card) 72'	Report	Johnston (yellow card) 53'; Alphonse (yellow card) 64'; Ciccarelli (yellow card) 69'	Stadium: Hamilton Stadium; Attendance: 5,340; Referee: Scott Bowman

Mid-season break for the 2026 FIFA World Cup

July 1 11	Forge FC	3–2	Vancouver FC	Hamilton, Ontario
1:00 pm	Borges 61'; Krutzen 64'; Batisse 75'; Rama (yellow card) 90+7'	Report	Campbell 7'; Bah 45+2'; Mousset (yellow card) 90'	Stadium: Hamilton Stadium; Attendance: 4,259; Referee: Fabrizio Stasolla

July 5 12	FC Supra	1–2	Forge FC	Laval, Quebec
1:00 pm	Auguste (yellow card) 42'; Kwemi 56'; Bey (yellow card) 69'	Report	Nimick (yellow card) 89', (goal) 43' (pen.); Borges (yellow card) 65'; Filion 66'; Aromatario (yellow card) 76'; Ampomah (yellow card) 89'	Stadium: Stade Boréale; Attendance: 2,128; Referee: Ben Hoskins

July 26 14	Inter Toronto	1–3	Forge FC	Toronto, Ontario
5:00 pm	Córdova (yellow card) 19'; Skublak 44', (yellow card) 45+4'; Badibanga (yellow card) 71'	Report	Batisse (yellow card) 18'; Ampomah 41', 56'; Jevremović (yellow card) 82'; Oketokoun 86'	Stadium: York Lions Stadium; Attendance: 2,985; Referee: Scott Bowman

August 3 15	HFX Wanderers FC	0–0	Forge FC	Halifax, Nova Scotia
3:00 pm	Johnston (yellow card) 51'; Reid (yellow card) 80'	Report	Massunda (yellow card) 34'; Batisse (yellow card) 35'; Nimick (yellow card) 45+3'; Borges (yellow card) 79'; Oketokoun (yellow card) 90+4'	Stadium: Wanderers Grounds; Attendance: 6,188; Referee: Sebastian Noshinravani

August 7 16	Forge FC	0–1	Vancouver FC	Hamilton, Ontario
7:00 pm	Ampomah (yellow card) 39'; Paton (yellow card) 48'; Rama (yellow card) 68'; Bourgeois (yellow card) 87'; Batisse (yellow card) 90+6'	Report	Pecile 44'; Mezquida (yellow card) 86'	Stadium: Hamilton Stadium; Attendance: 4,365; Referee: Renzo Villanueva

August 15 17	Cavalry FC	2–1	Forge FC	Foothills County, Alberta
3:00 pm	Edwards (yellow card) 38'; Klomp 62'; Antoniuk 83'	Report	Oketokoun 20'; Rama (red card) 38'; Nimick (yellow card) 41'; Sadek (yellow card) 41'; Aromatario (yellow card) 66'; Bourgeois (yellow card) 79'; Jevremović (red card) 90'	Stadium: ATCO Field; Attendance: 4,721; Referee: Roberto D'Alesio

August 19 18	Forge FC	3–2	FC Supra	Hamilton, Ontario
7:00 pm	Massunda 22'; Nimick 30' (pen.); Aromatario (yellow card) 65'; Sadek 77'	Report	Condé 12', 39'; Auguste (yellow card) 29'; Kwemi (yellow card) 73'	Stadium: Hamilton Stadium; Attendance: 3,295; Referee: Michael Venne

August 22 19	Forge FC	2–0	Pacific FC	Hamilton, Ontario
7:30 pm	Oketokoun 57'; Sadek 78'; Jevremović (yellow card) 90+4'	Report	Joshua Belluz (yellow card) 15'	Stadium: Hamilton Stadium; Attendance: 4,089; Referee: Scott Bowman
Note: Kick-off was rescheduled from 7:00 pm to 7:30 pm due to inclement weather. The match was delayed for more than two hours in the second half due to lightning.

August 28 20	FC Supra	1–0	Forge FC	Laval, Quebec
7:00 pm	Kwemi (yellow card) 26', (goal) 37' (pen.); Auguste (yellow card) 28'; Sissoko (yellow card) 76'; Fernandez (yellow card) 90+6'	Report	Batisse (yellow card) 36'; Sadek (yellow card) 59'; Filion (yellow card) 90+8'	Stadium: Stade Boréale; Attendance: 2,145; Referee: Iwan-Nikita Jecanski

September 5 21	Forge FC	1–1	Inter Toronto FC	Hamilton, Ontario
7:00 pm	Rama (yellow card) 38'; Ampomah (yellow card) 64'; Massunda 70'; Tristan Borges (yellow card) 90'	Report	Clarke 12'; Almagro (yellow card) 25'; Onyeocha (yellow card) 75'	Stadium: Hamilton Stadium; Attendance: 4,172; Referee: Sebastian Noshinravani

September 12 22	Forge FC	3–0	Atlético Ottawa	Hamilton, Ontario
7:00 pm	Bekker (yellow card) 39', (goal) 60'; Wright (yellow card) 71'; Bourgeois 79', 90+2'; Oketokoun (yellow card) 82'	Report	Aparicio (yellow card) 15'; Kozlovskiy (yellow card) 65'; Mbomio (yellow card) 66'	Stadium: Hamilton Stadium; Attendance: 3,810; Referee: Renzo Villanueva

September 19 23	Cavalry FC	1–1	Forge FC	Foothills County, Alberta
5:00 pm	H. Paton (yellow card) 30'; Camargo (yellow card) 57'; Warschewski (yellow card) 68' (yellow-red card) 90+2'; Antoniuk 90'	Report	Massunda (yellow card) 36'; James (yellow card) 62'; Jensen 80'; Cavallini (yellow card) 90+5'	Stadium: ATCO Field; Attendance: 5,009; Referee: Michael Venne

September 26 24	Vancouver FC	1–1	Forge FC	Langley, British Columbia
6:00 pm	Doner 64'; Toomey (yellow card) 68'; Mezquida (yellow card) 86'; Polisi (yellow card) 90+8'	Report	James 16'	Stadium: Willoughby Community Park; Attendance: 1,827

October 3 25	Forge FC	3–3	HFX Wanderers FC	Hamilton, Ontario
4:00 pm	Cavallini 4'; Nimick (yellow card) 60', (goal) 78'; Oketokoun 90'; James (yellow card) 90+16'	Report	Pierre 81'; Mackenzie 90+4'; Ciccarelli 90+13'	Stadium: Hamilton Stadium; Attendance: 4,174; Referee: Mathieu Souaré

October 7 13	Forge FC	3–0	Pacific FC	Hamilton, Ontario
7:00 pm	Jensen 43'; Cavallini 50' (pen.); Aromatario (yellow card) 85'; Paton 90+3'	Report	Juhmi (yellow card) 65'; Díaz (yellow card) 77'	Stadium: Hamilton Stadium; Attendance: 2,619; Referee: Mario Alayass
Note: The match was originally scheduled for July 16 but was postponed due to poor air quality. Kick-off had previously been rescheduled on July 16 from 7:00 pm to 8:00 pm. It was later rescheduled to October 7.

October 12 26	Forge FC	5–0	Inter Toronto FC	Hamilton, Ontario
1:00 pm	Jensen 4'; Ampomah 9'; Batisse 28'; Jevremović 46'; Aromatario (yellow card) 73'; Paton 89'	Report		Stadium: Hamilton Stadium; Attendance: 2,619; Referee: Alain Ruch

October 17 27	Atlético Ottawa	1–2	Forge FC	Ottawa, Ontario
1:00 pm	Gutiérrez (yellow card) 19' (yellow-red card) 61'; García (yellow card) 40'; Antinoro 90+7' (pen.)	Report	Johnson (yellow card) 15', (goal) 54'; Aromatario 33'; Batisse (yellow card) 55'	Stadium: TD Place Stadium; Referee: Ben Hoskins

October 25 28	Pacific FC	1–1	Forge FC	Victoria, British Columbia
4:00 pm	Toualy (yellow card) 50'; Kratt 72'; Greco-Taylor (yellow card) 83'; Browning Lagerfeldt (yellow card) 90+5'; Gomulka (yellow card) 90+7'	Report	Borges 12'; Nimick (yellow card) 71'	Stadium: Royal Athletic Park; Attendance: 3,311

==== Playoffs ====
Forge clinched its spot in the CPL playoffs on September 20; the club later clinched a top two finish on October 7, ensuring it will host host the second leg of its semifinal playoff tie. That same day, the club announced that it would host its semifinal match on November 7.

November 1 SF leg 1	Atlético Ottawa	2–2	Forge FC	Ottawa, Ontario
2:00 pm	Gutiérrez 23'; Tabla 43'	Report	Aromatario 15'; Jevremović 35'; Ampomah (yellow card) 89'	Stadium: TD Place Stadium; Attendance: 6,108; Referee: Mario Alayass

November 7 SF leg 2	Forge FC	2–3 (4–5 agg.)	Atlético Ottawa	Hamilton, Ontario
1:00 pm	Anthony Aromatario (yellow card) 29'; Massunda 45+5'; Ampomah (yellow card) 71'; Nimick 90+11' (pen.)	Report	Fleuriau Chateau 25', 84', 90+13'	Stadium: Hamilton Stadium; Attendance: 7,412; Referee: Sebastian Noshinravani

=== Canadian Championship ===
The Canadian Championship draw was held on January 17. As one of the four-highest ranked clubs based on the Canadian Championship Club Ranking Index, Forge were pre-seeded for the draw.

==== Preliminary round ====
Canada Soccer announced the preliminary round schedule on February 5.

May 9 Single leg	Forge FC	4–0	HFX Wanderers FC	Hamilton, Ontario
4:00 pm	Nimick (yellow card) 24'; Borges 44', 51'; Batisse 45+2'; Wright 54'	Report	Telfer (yellow card) 47'	Stadium: Hamilton Stadium; Attendance: 3,865; Referee: Yusri Rudolf
Note: The match was delayed about one hour after the 70th minute due to lightning.

==== Quarterfinals ====
Canada Soccer announced the schedule for the two-legged quarterfinals on May 13. The match time for the first leg in Laval was later rescheduled.

July 8 Leg 1	CS Saint-Laurent	1–1	Forge FC	Laval, Quebec
3:00 pm	Bahous 56', (yellow card) 90+4'	Report	Ampomah 15'; Nimick (yellow card) 41'; Batisse (yellow card) 68'	Stadium: Stade Boréale; Attendance: 950; Referee: Mathieu Souaré

July 12 Leg 2	Forge FC	2–1 (3–2 agg.)	CS Saint-Laurent	Hamilton, Ontario
4:00 pm	Wright 2'; Ampomah (yellow card) 44'; Jevremović (yellow card) 64'; Batisse 90+4'	Report	Balbinotti (yellow card) 13'; Aristilde 75'; Bahous (yellow card) 90+6'; Nboucha (yellow card) 90+7'	Stadium: Hamilton Stadium; Attendance: 3,048; Referee: Renzo Villanueva

==== Semifinals ====
Canada Soccer announced the schedule for the two-legged semifinals on July 30.

September 1 Leg 1	FC Supra du Québec	1–1	Forge FC	Laval, Quebec
6:00 pm	Condé 36'; Mlah (yellow card) 51'; Biello (yellow card) 85'; Abzi (yellow card) 88'	Report	Ampomah (yellow card) 26'; Krutzen (yellow card) 75', (goal) 90+5'	Stadium: Stade Boréale; Attendance: 3,150; Referee: Yusri Rudolf

September 15 Leg 2	Forge FC	1–0 (2–1 agg.)	FC Supra du Québec	Hamilton, Ontario
7:00 pm	Paton 26'; Aromatario (yellow card) 45+5'	Report	Condé (yellow card) 28'; Bey (yellow card) 83'; Chrétien (yellow card) 90+1'	Stadium: Hamilton Stadium; Attendance: 3,118; Referee: Pierre-Luc Lauzière

==== Final ====
October 21 Single leg	CF Montréal	1–1 (a.e.t.) (2–4 p)	Forge FC	Montreal, Quebec
7:00 pm	Craig (yellow card) 18'; Vera (yellow card) 32' (yellow-red card) 54'; Ríos 49'; Synchuk (yellow card) 100'	Report	James (yellow card) 24'; Cavallini (yellow card) 27'; Batisse 45+6'; Jevremović (yellow card) 82'	Stadium: Saputo Stadium; Attendance: 14,081; Referee: Michael Venne
	Penalties
	Owusu (penalty missed); Longstaff (penalty scored); Synchuk (penalty missed); Pereira (penalty scored)		(penalty scored) Borges; (penalty scored) Paton; (penalty missed) Krutzen; (penalty scored) Nimick; (penalty scored) James

=== CONCACAF Champions Cup ===
The CONCACAF Champions Cup draw was held on December 9, 2025, with Forge drawing Liga MX side Tigres UANL in round one. Having qualified as CPL regular season winners, Forge entered the competition in round one and began play in February.

==== Round one ====
The round one schedule was announced on December 12, 2025.

February 3 Leg 1	Forge FC (Canada)	0–0	(Mexico) Tigres UANL	Hamilton, Ontario
7:00 pm	Oketokoun (yellow card) 48'	Report		Stadium: Hamilton Stadium; Attendance: 4,560; Referee: Armando Villarreal (United States)

February 10 Leg 2	Tigres UANL (Mexico)	4–1 (4–1 agg.)	(Canada) Forge FC	San Nicolás de los Garza, Mexico
10:00 pm	Aguirre 22', 71'; Gorriarán (yellow card) 40'; Correa (yellow card) 52', (goal) 81'; Joaquim 86'	Report	Oketokoun (yellow card) 11'; Wright 80' (pen.)	Stadium: Estadio Universitario; Attendance: 22,902; Referee: Juan Gabriel Calderón (Costa Rica)

== Statistics ==
As of November 7, 2026

=== Goal scorers ===
Rank	Nat.	Player	Pos.	CPL	CPL Playoffs	Canadian Championship	Champions Cup	TOTAL
1	(France)	Antoine Batisse	DF	4	0	3	0	7
1	(Canada)	Brian Wright	FW	4	0	2	1	7
3	(Canada)	Tristan Borges	FW	3	0	2	0	5
3	(Canada)	Hoce Massunda	FW	4	1	0	0	5
3	(Canada)	Daniel Nimick	DF	4	1	0	0	5
3	(Spain)	Ismael Oketokoun	FW	5	0	0	0	5
3	(Canada)	Ben Paton	MF	4	0	1	0	5
8	(Ghana)	Nana Ampomah	FW	3	0	1	0	4
9	(Canada)	Noah Jensen	MF	3	0	0	0	3
9	(Serbia)	Marko Jevremović	DF	2	1	0	0	3
11	(Canada)	Anthony Aromatario	MF	1	1	0	0	2
11	(Canada)	Maxime Bourgeois	MF	2	0	0	0	2
11	(Canada)	Lucas Cavallini	FW	2	0	0	0	2
11	(Canada)	Maxime Filion	FW	2	0	0	0	2
11	(Belgium)	Daniël Krutzen	DF	1	0	1	0	2
11	(Canada)	Aghilas Sadek	MF	2	0	0	0	2
17	(Canada)	Kyle Bekker	MF	1	0	0	0	1
17	(Canada)	Manjrekar James	DF	1	0	0	0	1
17	(Canada)	Levonte Johnson	FW	1	0	0	0	1
Totals				49	4	10	1	64

=== Clean sheets ===
Rank	Nat.	Player	CPL	CPL Playoffs	Canadian Championship	Champions Cup	TOTAL
1	(Democratic Republic of the Congo)	Dimitry Bertaud	10	0	2	1	13
2	(Canada)	Dino Bontis	2	0	0	0	2
Totals			12	0	2	1	15

== Honours ==
=== Canadian Premier League Awards ===
The 2026 Canadian Premier League Awards ceremony is scheduled for November 19.

Name	Award	Status	Source
Antoine Batisse	Defender of the Year	Nominated	
Antoine Batisse	Player of the Year	Nominated	
Antoine Batisse	Player's Player of the Year	Nominated	
Dimitry Bertaud	Golden Glove	Nominated	
Dimitry Bertaud	Player's Player of the Year	Nominated	
Hoce Massunda	Best Canadian U-21 Player	Nominated	
Daniel Nimick	Defender of the Year	Nominated	
Bobby Smyrniotis	Coach of the Year	Nominated	

==== Monthly awards ====
Month	Name	Award	Source
April	Bobby Smyrniotis	Manager of the Month	
April	Dimitry Bertaud	Goalkeeper of the Month	
June	Dimitry Bertaud (2)	Goalkeeper of the Month	
October	Dino Bontis	Goalkeeper of the Month	

=== Canadian Championship Awards ===
Name	Award	Source
Dimitry Bertaud	George Gross Memorial Trophy	
