= 2026 HFX Wanderers FC season =

Halifax Wanderers
2026 season
- President: Derek Martin
- Head coach: Vanni Sartini
- Stadium: Wanderers Grounds

The 2026 HFX Wanderers FC season is the eighth season in the history of HFX Wanderers FC. In addition to the Canadian Premier League, the club will compete in the Canadian Championship. This season is the first one in which IFAB's "daylight rule" to offside positions was incorporated as a trial run, and is also the introduction of Football Video Support (FVS) to league play.

This is the club's first season led by former Vancouver Whitecaps head coach Vanni Sartini, who was announced as the new head coach and general manager on December 10, 2025. At the end of the previous season, Halifax parted ways with their former coach, Patrice Gheisar.

== Squad ==
As of September 2, 2026

No.	Player	Nationality	Position(s)	Date of birth (age)	Previous club	Notes
Goalkeepers
1	Marco Carducci	(Canada)	GK	September 24, 1996 (age 30)	(Canada) Cavalry FC	
12	Sinclair Astridge	(Canada)	GK	April 12, 2005 (age 21)	(Canada) Dalhousie Tigers	U21
Defenders
2	Finn Linder	(New Zealand)	CB	May 6, 2004 (age 22)	(Canada) Whitecaps FC 2	
16	Kareem Sow	(Canada)	CB	September 28, 2000 (age 26)	(Canada) Montreal Carabins	
21	Jefferson Alphonse	(Canada)	CB	June 12, 2003 (age 23)	(Canada) CS Saint-Laurent	
26	Thomas Meilleur-Giguère	(Canada)	CB	November 13, 1997 (age 28)	(Canada) Pacific FC	
33	Ilan Ahmed	(Djibouti)	CB	February 20, 2009 (age 17)	(Canada) Edmonton Juventus	U21, EYT
41	Harvey Hughes	(England)	LB / CB	December 20, 2003 (age 22)	(Canada) CBU Capers	U-S
Midfielders
5	Lucas Olguin	(Canada)	CM	September 26, 2005 (age 21)	(Canada) Toronto FC II	U21
6	Lorenzo Callegari	(France)	CM	February 27, 1998 (age 28)	(France) Chambly	
8	Isaiah Johnston	(Canada)	CM	August 14, 2001 (age 25)	(United States) Loudoun United	
17	Francesco Troisi	(Canada)	MID	April 11, 2007 (age 19)	(Canada) Whitecaps FC Academy	U21
18	Andre Rampersad	(Trinidad and Tobago)	CM	February 2, 1995 (age 31)	(Trinidad and Tobago) Santa Rosa	
22	Sven Zitman	(Netherlands)	CM / DM	February 24, 2002 (age 24)	(Netherlands) TOP Oss	INT
23	Miguel Arilla	(Spain)	AM / LW	January 9, 2003 (age 23)	(United States) Creighton Bluejays	INT
	Liam Mackenzie	(Canada)	AM	March 15, 2007 (age 19)	(Canada) Vancouver Whitecaps	U21, Loan
Forwards
7	Ryan Telfer	(Trinidad and Tobago)	LW	March 4, 1994 (age 32)	(United States) Miami FC	
9	Victor Akinwale	(England)	ST	August 6, 2004 (age 22)	(England) Crystal Palace U21	INT
10	Yohan Baï	(France)	RM / RW	September 28, 1996 (age 30)	(Bulgaria) Lokomotiv Plovdiv	INT
11	Adonijah Reid	(Canada)	CF	August 13, 1999 (age 27)	(United States) Sporting JAX	
14	Jason Bahamboula	(Republic of the Congo)	RW / CF	June 15, 2001 (age 25)	(Latvia) Valmiera FC	INT
20	Tavio Ciccarelli	(Canada)	CF	July 24, 2006 (age 20)	(England) Sheffield United Academy	U21, EYT
27	Nelson Pierre	(Haiti)	CF	March 22, 2005 (age 21)	(Canada) Vancouver Whitecaps	INT, Loan

== Transfers ==
=== In ===
No.	Pos.	Player	From club	Fee/notes	Date	Source
	GK	(Canada) Marco Carducci	(Canada) Cavalry FC	Free	December 22, 2025	
	DF	(New Zealand) Finn Linder	(Canada) Whitecaps FC 2	Free	January 14, 2026	
	MF	(Canada) Lucas Olguin	(Canada) Toronto FC II	Free	January 15, 2026	
	MF	(Spain) Miguel Arilla	(United States) Creighton Bluejays	Free	January 21, 2026	
	MF	(Netherlands) Sven Zitman	(Netherlands) TOP Oss	Free	January 23, 2026	
	MF	(Canada) Francesco Troisi	(Canada) Whitecaps FC Academy	Free	January 26, 2026	
	DF	(Canada) Marcus Godinho	(Sweden) Degerfors IF	Free	January 28, 2026	
	FW	(England) Victor Akinwale	(England) Crystal Palace U21	Free	February 25, 2026	
	GK	(Canada) Sinclair Astridge	(Canada) Dalhousie Tigers	Free	March 19, 2026	
	DF	(England) Harvey Hughes	(Canada) CBU Capers	Selected 6th in the 2026 CPL–U Sports Draft, U Sports contract	March 20, 2026	
	DF	(Djibouti) Ilan Ahmed	(Canada) Edmonton Juventus	Free, Exceptional Young Talent contract	April 23, 2026	
	FW	(Canada) Adonijah Reid	(United States) Sporting JAX	Free	July 16, 2026	

==== Loans in ====
No.	Pos.	Player	From club	Fee/notes	Date	Source
	FW	(Tanzania) Cyprian Kachwele	(Canada) Whitecaps FC 2	Loaned until August 28, 2026	March 18, 2026	
	FW	(Haiti) Nelson Pierre	(Canada) Vancouver Whitecaps	Loaned until end of season	August 27, 2026	
	MF	(Canada) Liam Mackenzie	(Canada) Vancouver Whitecaps	Loaned until end of season	September 2, 2026	

==== Draft picks ====
HFX Wanderers selected the following players in the 2026 CPL–U Sports Draft. Draft picks are not automatically signed to the team roster. Only those who are signed to a contract will be listed as transfers in.

Round	Selection	Pos.	Player	Nationality	University
1	6	DF	Harvey Hughes	England	Cape Breton
2	13	FW	Kautchy Andji-Yapi	Canada	Moncton

=== Out ===
No.	Pos.	Player	To club	Fee/notes	Date	Source
5	DF	(Canada) Adam Pearlman	(Canada) Toronto FC	Loan ended	November 9, 2025	
23	MF	(Canada) Alessandro Biello	(Canada) CF Montréal	Loan ended	November 9, 2025	
13	GK	(Canada) Aiden Rushenas		Contract expired	December 31, 2025	
17	DF	(Canada) Wesley Timoteo	(Canada) Atlético Ottawa	Contract expired	December 31, 2025	
11	MF	(Brazil) Vitor Dias	(United States) Tormenta FC	Contract expired	December 31, 2025	
28	MF	(Canada) Jérémy Gagnon-Laparé		Contract expired	December 31, 2025	
10	FW	(Canada) Sean Rea	(Canada) FC Supra	Contract expired	December 31, 2025	
44	DF	(Algeria) Nassim Mekideche	(Algeria) Olympique Akbou	Option declined	December 31, 2025	
99	GK	(Algeria) Rayane Yesli	(Algeria) Olympique Akbou	Option declined	December 31, 2025	
4	DF	(Canada) Julian Dunn		Option declined	December 31, 2025	
41	MF	(Canada) Camilo Vasconcelos	(Vietnam) Hải Phòng FC	Option declined	December 31, 2025	
	FW	(Canada) Reshaun Walkes		Option declined	December 31, 2025	
9	FW	(Canada) Tiago Coimbra	(Sweden) IFK Göteborg	Undisclosed fee & sell-on clause	January 31, 2026	
28	DF	(Canada) Marcus Godinho	(United States) Sporting JAX	Contract terminated by mutual consent	July 16, 2026	

== Competitions ==
Matches are listed in Halifax local time: Atlantic Daylight Time (UTC−3) from March 8 until November 1, and Atlantic Standard Time (UTC−4) otherwise.

=== Overview ===
Competition	First match	Last match	Starting round	Record							
Competition	First match	Last match	Starting round	Pld	W	D	L	GF	GA	GD	Win %
Canadian Premier League	April 4	October 25	Matchday 1	2	1	1	0	3	2	+1	50.00
Canadian Championship	May 9		Preliminary round	0	0	0	0	0	0	+0	—
Total				2	1	1	0	3	2	+1	50.00

Last updated: April 12, 2026
Source: Competitions

=== Canadian Premier League ===
==== Table ====
Pos	Team	Pld	W	D	L	GF	GA	GD	Pts	Qualification
1	Cavalry FC (S)	28	18	6	4	58	23	+35	60	Playoffs and 2027 CONCACAF Champions Cup
2	Forge FC (V)	28	17	7	4	49	22	+27	58	Playoffs and 2027 CONCACAF Champions Cup (Note: As winners of Canadian Championship)
3	Atlético Ottawa	28	13	4	11	42	45	−3	43	Playoffs
4	Supra du Québec	28	11	5	12	47	50	−3	38	Playoffs
5	Vancouver FC	28	10	7	11	39	37	+2	37	
6	Inter Toronto	28	7	9	12	42	65	−23	30	
7	HFX Wanderers	28	7	7	14	44	50	−6	28	
8	Pacific FC	28	2	9	17	33	62	−29	15	

Source: CPL
Rules for classification: 1) Points; 2) Total wins; 3) Head-to-head; 4) Goal differential; 5) Goals for; 6) Away goal differential; 7) Away goals for; 8) Home goal differential; 9) Home goals for; 10) Fewest disciplinary points; 11) Most under-21 domestic player minutes; 12) Drawing of lots.
(S) CPL Shield winner; (V) Canadian Championship winners

==== Results by match ====
Match	1	2	3	4	5	6	7	8	9	10	11	12	13	14	15	16	17	18	19	20	21	22	23	24	25	26	27	28
Result	W	D	D	L	L	L	D	W	L	L	W	L	W	D	L													
Position	3	3																										

Updated to match(es) played on April 12, 2026. Source: #Matches
W = Win; D = Draw; L = Loss

==== Matches ====
4 April 2026 Match Week 1	Vancouver FC	0-1	Halifax Wanderers	Langley, British Columbia
16:00 PT (UTC-07:00)	Polisi (yellow card) 4'; Gee (yellow card) 90+2'; Field (yellow card) 90+5'	Report	Callegari (yellow card) 22'; Olguin (yellow card) 39'; Callegari 69'; Akinwale (yellow card) 90+3'	Stadium: Willoughby Stadium; Attendance: 3,528; Referee: Roberto D'Alesio

11 April 2026 Match Week 2	Inter Toronto	2-2	Halifax Wanderers	Toronto, Ontario
15:00 EDT (UTC-04:00)	Skublak (yellow card) 29'; Bitar (yellow card) 38'; Altobelli 43'; Altobelli 53'; Singh (yellow card) 68'	Report	Sow 49'; Godinho (yellow card) 77'; Ciccarelli 86'	Stadium: York Lions Stadium; Attendance: 2,589; Referee: Scott Bowman

18 April 2026 Match Week 3	Halifax Wanderers	2-2	Pacific FC	Halifax, Nova Scotia
14:00 ADT (UTC-03:00)	Telfer (yellow card) 35'; Kachwele 56'; Johnston 76' (pen.); Ciccarelli (yellow card) 78'	Report	Díaz 20'; Greco-Taylor (yellow card) 73'; Heard (red card) 79'; Juach 90+8'	Stadium: Wanderers Grounds; Attendance: 5,888; Referee: Fabrizio Stasolla

24 April 2026 Match Week 4	FC Supra	2-1	Halifax Wanderers	Montreal, Quebec
19:00 EDT (UTC-04:00)	Chrétien 26'; Abzi (yellow card) 48'; Biello (yellow card) 57'; Mlah 77', (yellow card) 86'	Report	Johnston 12' (pen.), (yellow card) 45+5'; Zitman (yellow card) 17'	Stadium: Stade du CEPSUM; Attendance: 3,803; Referee: Michael Venne

2 May 2026 Match Week 5	Halifax Wanderers	1-3	Forge FC	Halifax, Nova Scotia
15:00 ADT (UTC-03:00)	Godinho (yellow card) 30'; Johnston 58' (pen.); Alphonse (yellow card) 63'; Kachwele (yellow card) 73'	Report	Wright 24'; Massunda (yellow card) 45', (goal) 68'; Batisse 51'	Stadium: Wanderers Grounds; Attendance: 6,044; Referee: Roberto D'Alesio

17 May 2026 Match Week 6	Atlético Ottawa	1-0	Halifax Wanderers	Ottawa, Ontario
13:00 EDT (UTC-04:00)	Villal 31' (yellow card) 90+4'; Aguilar (yellow card) 46'	Report	Godinho (yellow card) 28'; Sow (yellow card) 45+1'; Arilla (yellow card) 89'	Stadium: TD Place Stadium; Attendance: 5,061; Referee: Renzo Villaneuva

23 May 2026 Match Week 7	Halifax Wanderers	1-1	Inter Toronto	Halifax, Nova Scotia
16:00 ADT (UTC-03:00)	Johnston 35'; Godinho (yellow card) 71'; Linder (yellow card) 77'	Report	Altobelli 22'; Gonzales (yellow card) 56'; Kibato (yellow card) 73'	Stadium: Wanderers Grounds; Referee: Mathieu Souaré

30 May 2026 Match Week 8	Halifax Wanderers	1-0	Vancouver FC	Halifax, Nova Scotia
16:00 ADT (UTC-03:00)	Callegari (yellow card) 29'; Johnston (yellow card) 76'; Ciccarelli (yellow card) 90+2' (yellow-red card) 90+5', (goal) 90+3'	Report	Bah (yellow card) 87'	Stadium: Wanderers Grounds; Referee: Michael Venne
Note: HFX Wanderers coach Vanni Sartini received a yellow card in the 82' minute.

6 June 2026 Match Week 9	Cavalry FC	2-0	Halifax Wanderers	Foothills County, Alberta
17:00 (UTC-06:00)	Kobza (yellow card) 30'; Pearlman (yellow card) 38'; Paton (yellow card) 55'; Ntignee 68'; Klomp 79'	Report	Callegari (yellow card) 76'; Godinho (yellow card) 84'	Stadium: ATCO Field; Attendance: 4,106; Referee: Sebastian Noshinravani

10 June 2026 Match Week 10	Forge FC	1-0	Halifax Wanderers	Hamilton, Ontario
19:00 EDT (UTC-04:00)	Wright 57', (yellow card) 58'; Aromatario (yellow card) 72'	Report	Johnston (yellow card) 53'; Alphonse (yellow card) 64'; Ciccarelli (yellow card) 69'	Stadium: Hamilton Stadium; Attendance: 5,340; Referee: Scott Bowman

26 June 2026 Match Week 11	Halifax Wanderers	5-2	Pacific FC	Halifax, Nova Scotia
18:30 ADT (UTC-03:00)	Lajeunesse 26' (o.g.); Arilla 32'; Olguin (yellow card) 58'; Callegari (yellow card) 63'; Chung 68' (o.g.); Johnston 74'; Ciccarelli 90+4' (pen.)	Report	Bustos 26'; Gomulka 64'	Stadium: Wanderers Grounds; Referee: Renzo Villanueva

1 July 2026 Match week 11	Halifax Wanderers	1-3	Atlético Ottawa	Halifax, Nova Scotia
16:00 ADT (UTC-03:00)	Ciccarelli 68'; Godinho (yellow card) 76'	Report	Tabla 3', 36' (pen.); Antinoro 26'; Kozlovskiy (yellow card) 56'	Stadium: Wanderers Grounds; Referee: Yusri Rudolf

5 July 2026 Match Week 12	Pacific FC	1-2	Halifax Wanderers	Langford, British Columbia
15:00 PT (UTC-07:00)	Heard (yellow card) 42'; Díaz 52' (pen.)	Report	Ciccarelli 21'; Callegari 60'	Stadium: Starlight Stadium; Referee: Alain Ruch

18 July 2026 13	Cavalry FC	1-1	Halifax Wanderers	Foothills County, Alberta
13:00 MDT (UTC-05:00)	Ntignee (yellow card) 39'; Warschewski 52' (pen.); Klomp (yellow card) 90+6'	Report	Johnston 77'	Stadium: ATCO Field; Attendance: 4,050; Referee: Renzo Villanueva

24 July 2026 Match Week 14	Halifax Wanderers	2-3	FC Supra	Halifax, Nova Scotia
19:00 ADT (UTC-03:00)	Kachwele 28'; Linder 45'; Meilleur-Giguère (yellow card) 76'	Report	Chrétien (yellow card) 40'; Kwemi 65', 67', 77' (pen.)	Stadium: Wanderers Grounds; Referee: Fabrizio Stasolla

2 Aug. 2026 Match Week 15	Halifax Wanderers	v	Forge FC	Halifax, Nova Scotia
19:00 ADT (UTC-03:00)				Stadium: Wanderers Grounds

8 Aug. 2026 Match Week 16	Atlético Ottawa	v	Halifax Wanderers	Ottawa, Ontario
				Stadium: TD Place Stadium

16 Aug. 2026 Match Week 17	Inter Toronto	v	Halifax Wanderers	Toronto, Ontario
				Stadium: York Lions Stadium

22 Aug. 2026 Match Week 19	Halifax Wanderers	v	Vancouver FC	Halifax, Nova Scotia
				Stadium: Wanderers Grounds

30 Aug. 2026 Match Week 20	Pacific FC	v	Halifax Wanderers	Langford, British Columbia
				Stadium: Starlight Stadium

7 Sept. 2026 Match Week 21	Halifax Wanderers	v	Cavalry FC	Halifax, Nova Scotia
				Stadium: Wanderers Grounds

20 Sept. 2026 Match Week 23	Halifax Wanderers	v	Inter Toronto	Halifax, Nova Scotia
				Stadium: Wanderers Grounds

26 Sept. 2026 Match Week 24	Halifax Wanderers	v	Atlético Ottawa	Halifax, Nova Scotia
				Stadium: Wanderers Grounds

3 Oct. 2026 Match Week 25	Forge FC	v	Halifax Wanderers	Hamilton, Ontario
				Stadium: Hamilton Stadium

12 Oct. 2026 Match Week 26	Halifax Wanderers	v	Cavalry FC	Halifax, Nova Scotia
				Stadium: Wanderers Grounds

16 Oct. 2026 Match Week 27	Vancouver FC	v	Halifax Wanderers	Langley, British Columbia
				Stadium: Willoughby Stadium

25 Oct. 2026 Match Week 28	Halifax Wanderers	v	FC Supra	Halifax, Nova Scotia
				Stadium: Wanderers Grounds

== Canadian Championship ==
9 May 2026 Preliminary Round	Forge FC	4-0	HFX Wanderers FC	Hamilton, Ontario
16:00 EDT	Borges 44', 51'; Batisse 45+2'; Wright 54'			Stadium: Hamilton Stadium; Attendance: 3,865; Referee: Yusri Rudolf
