= Tommy Wheeldon Jr. =

English footballer (born 1979)

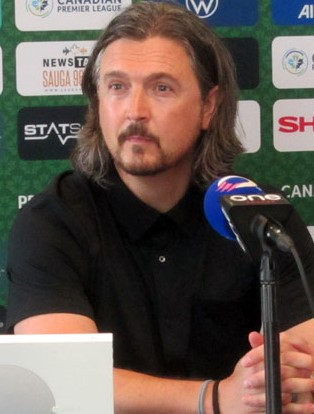
- Wheeldon in 2022

Personal information
- Full name: Thomas Wheeldon Jr.
- Date of birth: 3 May 1979 (age 47)
- Place of birth: Liverpool, England
- Position: Defender

Team information
- Current team: Cavalry FC (head coach)

Youth career
- Plymouth Argyle
- 1995–1997: Swindon Town
- Torquay United

Senior career*
Years	Team	Apps	(Gls)
- Torquay United
- Yeovil Town
- Salisbury City
1997	Cinderford Town		
1997	Witney Town		
- Weston-super-Mare
- Highworth Town
2002–2004	Calgary Storm	28	(0)
2005–2006	Calgary Callies		

Managerial career
- 2014–2016: Canada U17 (assistant)
- 2015–2018: Calgary Foothills
- 2018–: Cavalry FC
- * Club domestic league appearances and goals

Thomas Vincent Wheeldon Jr. (born 3 May 1979) is an English former professional footballer and current head coach of Cavalry FC in the Canadian Premier League.

== Playing career ==
Wheeldon began his playing career in England with Swindon Town before moving to Torquay United.

In May 2002, Wheeldon joined the Calgary Storm of the A-League to play under the management of his father, Tommy Wheeldon Sr. He went on to make 28 appearances for the club across two seasons. During his time as a player, he also worked as a full-time academy coach and soccer camp director for the club.

== Coaching career ==
=== Calgary Foothills ===
After the Calgary Storm folded, Wheeldon decided to remain in Canada and help develop grassroots football. After four years as a director for a local soccer academy, he joined the Calgary Foothills as assistant technical director in 2007 and was promoted to technical director a year later. In 2015, Wheeldon was named as head coach as the club joined the Premier Development League. In his second season as head coach, Wheeldon guided the team to an appearance in the PDL Championship Final before losing to the Michigan Bucks. In 2016, Wheeldon received the Jack Buckler Award for outstanding contribution to the sport of soccer within Calgary and area.

After having accepted the role as head coach and general manager of Cavalry FC, Wheeldon led Calgary Foothills to the 2018 PDL Championship, defeating Reading United AC 4–2.

=== Canada Soccer ===
In April 2014, Wheeldon began a two-year spell as assistant coach for the Canada U17 men's national team.

=== Cavalry FC ===
On 18 May 2018, Wheeldon was announced as the first head coach and general manager of Canadian Premier League club Cavalry FC. Wheeldon signed 12 players from the Foothills to Cavalry, including captain Nik Ledgerwood and goalkeeper Marco Carducci. Under Wheeldon's coaching, Cavalry won both the spring and fall seasons in the 2019 Canadian Premier League season. Cavalry also made it to the semifinals of the 2019 Canadian Championship, where they lost to the Major League Soccer team Montreal Impact. Along the way, Cavalry had defeated fellow Canadian Premier League sides Pacific FC and Forge FC as well as the Vancouver Whitecaps in the quarterfinals, becoming the first CPL team to win against an MLS team. Wheeldon won the CPL coach of the year for the 2019 season.

During the 2023 CPL campaign, Wheeldon led Cavalry to the victory of the regular season, and won his second Coach of the Year Award as a result. In January 2026, was called in to the technical staff for a Canadian national team camp as well as a friendly against Guatemala.

== Personal life ==
Wheeldon was born in Liverpool, England. His father, Tommy Wheeldon Sr, was a professional footballer who represented Everton and England Under-18s.

He attended the University of Surrey to study sports science and coaching.

Wheeldon is a lifelong Everton supporter.

== Career statistics ==
=== Player ===
Appearances and goals by club, season and competition
Club	Season	League			Cup		Continental		Total	
Club	Season	Division	Apps	Goals	Apps	Goals	Apps	Goals	Apps	Goals
Calgary Storm	2002	A-League	7	0	0	0	0	0	7	0
Calgary Storm	2003	A-League	21	0	0	0	0	0	21	0
Calgary Storm	Total		28	0	0	0	0	0	28	0
Career total			28	0	0	0	0	0	28	0

=== Manager ===
As of 9 November 2025

Managerial record by club and tenure
Team	From	To	Record							
Team	From	To	M	W	D	L	GF	GA	GD	Win %
Calgary Foothills	17 May 2015	4 August 2018	64	38	16	10	106	60	+46	59.38
Cavalry FC	17 May 2018	present	214	106	51	57	316	223	+93	49.53
Total			278	144	67	67	422	283	+139	51.80

== Honours ==
Calgary Foothills

- USL League Two
  - Champions: 2018
  - Western Conference Champions: 2016, 2018
  - Northwest Division Champions: 2016, 2018

Cavalry

- CPL Shield:
  - Champions: 2019, 2023
- Canadian Premier League Finals
  - Champions: 2024
  - Runners-up: 2019, 2023, 2025

Individual

- Canadian Premier League :
  - Coach of the Year: 2019, 2023
