= Jed Davies =

Welsh football coach (born 1988)

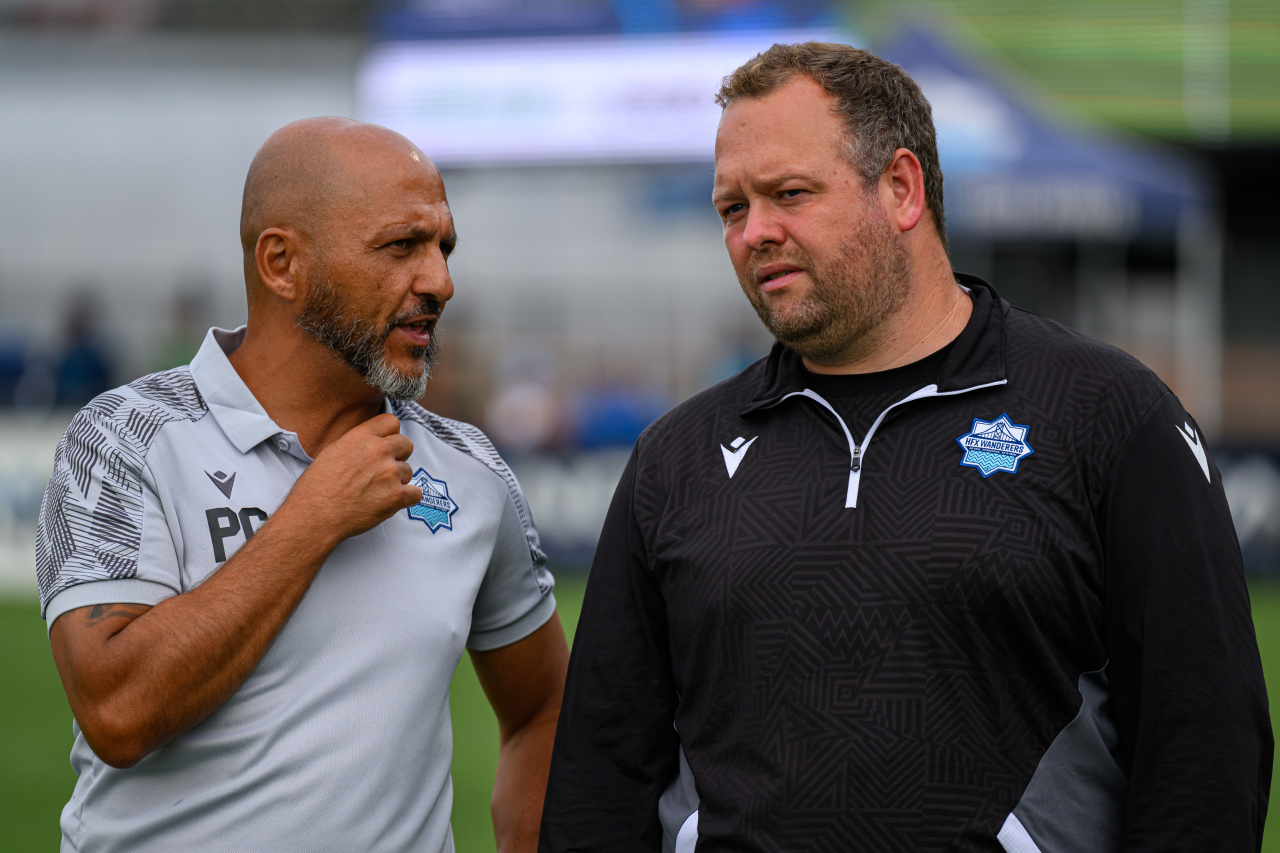
- Jed Davies with Patrice Gheisar, HFX Wanderers FC 2024

Personal information
- Full name: Jed Cynan Davies
- Date of birth: 6 January 1988 (age 38)
- Place of birth: Cardiff, Wales
- Height: 6 ft 0 in (1.83 m)
- Position: Defender

Team information
- Current team: HFX Wanderers

Youth career
- Years: Team
- 2000-2004: Cirencester Town

Managerial career
- 2013–2014: Oxford University
- 2014–2018: Iran National Team (tactical analyst)
- 2016–2019: Ottawa Fury (assistant)
- 2021–2022: Miami FC (assistant)
- 2023–2025: HFX Wanderers (assistant)
- 2023–2025: HFX Wanderers (U21 Head Coach)
- 2025-2026: UPEI Panthers
- 2025-2026: Canada Women's U17 (assistant)
- 2026-: HFX Wanderers (U21 Head Coach)
- 2026-: HFX Wanderers (assistant)

Jed Davies (born 6 January 1988) is a Welsh professional football coach who currently is the head of youth and first team assistant for HFX Wanderers.

== Coaching career ==
=== Oxford University AFC ===
Davies worked at Oxford University AFC alongside Mickey Lewis and Jon Collins from 2013 to 2014 before going on to work with Magnus Pehrsson, Manager of the Estonia national football team in 2015.

=== Iran National Team ===
Davies worked as a consultant-analyst for the Iran national football team at the 2015 AFC Asian Cup and 2018 FIFA World Cup where Iran defeated Morocco, tied Portugal and narrowly lost to Spain

=== Ottawa Fury FC ===
On 9 August 2016, Davies was hired by USL Championship side Ottawa Fury FC alongside Bruce Grobbelaar, Julian de Guzman and Martin Nash as a first team assistant coach, working under head coach Paul Dalglish.

=== Miami FC ===
Davies moved to Miami FC in the USL Championship In 2021 as an assistant coach.

=== Ottawa St. Anthony Futuro Soccer Academy ===
Davies worked as Head of Player Development at Ottawa St. Anthony Futuro Soccer Academy between July 2014 and February 2023. Tyr Walker, Antoine Coupland, Noah Abatneh, Eric Lajeunesse and Elage Bah were graduates who went on to play professionally in the Canadian Premier League and MLS. Sadie Sider-Echenberg, another graduate from the same age group at the club went on to play for Le Havre AC and became the youngest goal scorer in Division 1 Féminine in the club's history.

"One of the assistants for Halifax Wanderers, his name is Jed Davies, he taught me a lot about the tactical side of the game and a lot of the technical skills I use today is a product of the repetition I was doing at those ages."

— Noah Abatneh (York United FC) and the role coaches played on his youth development.

=== HFX Wanderers FC ===
On 6 February 2023, head coach Patrice Gheisar named Jed Davies as an Assistant Coach and Head of Youth Development at HFX Wanderers FC in the Canadian Premier League

In the club announcement HFX Wanderers Founder and President Derek Martin said:

“Jed's addition represents a significant investment on our behalf to improve the development pathway in our region, It remains our goal to see multiple Atlantic Canadian players earn their way onto the Wanderers’ first-team roster.”

During his time with HFX Wanderers, the club recorded its highest league finish in club history (2023 season) and a number of players from the HFX Wanderers under-21 team made their professional debuts including Tiago Coimbra, Camilo Vasconcelos, Jefferson Alphonse and Aiden Rushenas.

=== UPEI Panthers ===
On 18 December 2024, Jed Davies was named the new head coach of UPEI Soccer Panthers, taking over from Lewis Page who had departed to become head coach of Halifax Tides FC after 25 seasons with UPEI Soccer Panthers.

=== HFX Wanderers FC ===
On 14 January 2026, head coach Vanni Sartini welcomed back Jed Davies as an Assistant Coach and Head of Youth Development at HFX Wanderers FC in the Canadian Premier League

In the club announcement, Vanni Sartini spoke highly of Davies’ player development track record:

“Jed’s capacity as both a coach and a developer of young talent is incredible”

== Coach education ==
Davies was a co-founder of Inspire Football Coach Education UK, a coach education company that featured the likes of Dick Bate, Raymond Verheijen, FC Barcelona's Albert Capellas, Brian Ashton and many other reputable guests.

Davies has presented for a number of clubs and coach education companies and events such as the World Football Academy Expert Meeting, owned by Dutch coach Raymond Verheijen. Verheijen (former Wales Assistant Manager) referred to Davies as one of the "next generation" of coaches who he appreciated as an educator of football tactics.

In 2019, Davies became a professor at the University of Ottawa where he taught Strategy in Sport: Association Football.

== Published books ==
In 2013 Davies published Coaching the Tiki-Taka Style of Play, a book positively reviewed by Eddie Howe among many others. Eddie Howe commented how the book was one of "Inspiration, different ideas and new angles that can make you better" during his Soccer AM interview on Sky Sports.

The Philosophy of Football: In Shadows of Marcelo Bielsa was published in 2016. The book included insights from Michael Beale, Mark Sampson, Chris Davies and those close to the working methods of Marcelo Bielsa.

On 1 May 2026, Davies published ball., the first volume of his Technical-Tactical Football Theory trilogy. Matías Manna, analyst with the Argentina national team that won the 2022 World Cup, wrote in the foreword: "When you read this book, you cannot remain apathetic. You will carry Jed's flag and plant it in your club, in your barrio, in your team, or, most importantly, in your lenses for seeing the game."
