= Canadian Premier League Coach of the Year =

Soccer award for Canadian Premier League coaches

Coach of the Year
- Sport: Soccer
- League: Canadian Premier League
- Country: Canada

History
- First award: 2019
- First winner: (England) Tommy Wheeldon Jr.
- Most wins: Tommy Wheeldon Jr. Bobby Smyrniotis (2)
- Most recent: Bobby Smyrniotis (2025)
- Website: canpl.ca/awards/

The Canadian Premier League Coach of the Year award has been awarded since the inaugural 2019 season to a Canadian Premier League head coach. The award is given to the coach who receives the most votes from each head coach and one assistant coach from all the participating teams. It is awarded annually at the Canadian Premier League Awards ceremony.

Initially the award was based on the entire Canadian Premier League season, including the playoffs. In 2022, a change was made to all CPL awards so that they are only judged based on results from the regular season.

Bobby Smyrniotis and Tommy Wheeldon Jr., the current head coaches of Forge FC and Cavalry FC respectively, have won the most awards with two titles each. The only coach who won the award, while also winning the Canadian Premier League championship is Pa-Modou Kah, who led Pacific FC to their first league championship in 2021.

== Winners by year ==
Coach of the Year
Season	Coach	Nationality	Club	Regular season			Playoffs		Ref
Season	Coach	Nationality	Club	Record	Pts	Place	Starting round	Result	Ref
2019	Tommy Wheeldon Jr.	ENG	Cavalry	19–5–4	62	1st	Finals	Runner-up	
2020	Stephen Hart	TRI	HFX Wanderers	Regular season not played (Note: 3–3–1 (12 pts) in first stage. 1–1–1 (4 pts) in group stage.)			Final	Runner-up	
2021	Pa-Modou Kah	NOR	Pacific	13–6–9	45	3rd	Semifinals	Champions	
2022	Carlos González	ESP	Atlético Ottawa	13–10–5	49	1st	Semifinals	Runner-up	
2023	Tommy Wheeldon Jr. (2)	ENG	Cavalry	16–7–5	55	1st	First semifinal	Runner-up	
2024	Bobby Smyrniotis	CAN	Forge	15–5–8	50	1st	First semifinal	Runner-up	
2025	Bobby Smyrniotis (2)	CAN	Forge	16–10–2	58	1st	First semifinal	Semifinals	

== Records ==
Coach	Titles	Finalist	Years won	Years finalist
(Canada) Bobby Smyrniotis	2	5	2024, 2025	2019, 2020, 2021, 2022, 2023
(England) Tommy Wheeldon Jr.	2	2	2019, 2023	2021, 2024
(Spain) Carlos González	1	0	2022	–
(Trinidad and Tobago) Stephen Hart	1	0	2020	–
(Norway) Pa-Modou Kah	1	0	2021	–
(Canada) Jim Brennan	0	1	–	2019
(Canada) Mauro Eustáquio	0	1	–	2025
(Canada) Patrice Gheisar	0	1	–	2023
(Mexico) Diego Mejía	0	1	–	2025
(Canada) James Merriman	0	1	–	2022
(Spain) Mista	0	1	–	2020
(Mexico) Benjamín Mora	0	1	–	2024
