= Ismael Oketokoun =

Spanish footballer (born 2006)

Personal information
- Full name: Ismael Oketokoun Hassane
- Date of birth: 4 August 2006 (age 20)
- Place of birth: Mallorca, Spain
- Height: 1.78 m (5 ft 10 in)
- Position: Forward

Team information
- Current team: Forge FC
- Number: 7

Youth career
- Recreativo La Victoria
- CD La Salle
- Mallorca
- AD Penya Arrabal
- 2023–2025: CD San Francisco
- 2024: → Mallorca (loan)

Senior career*
Years	Team	Apps	(Gls)
2025	Platges de Calvià	7	(2)
2026–	Forge FC	22	(5)
- * Club domestic league appearances and goals as of 25 October 2026

Ismael Oketokoun Hassane (born 4 August 2006) is a Spanish footballer who plays for Forge FC in the Canadian Premier League.

== Early life ==
Oketokoun began playing youth football Recreativo La Victoria, before joining C.D. La Salle for four years, followed by the youth system of Mallorca. He then joined AD Penya Arrabal, followed by CD San Francisco, then re-joining Mallorca where he won the Copa del Rey Juvenil in 2023–24.

== Club career ==
In 2025, Oketokoun began playing with Platges de Calvià in the Tercera Federación.

In January 2026, he signed with Forge FC in the Canadian Premier League, on a multi-year contract. He made his debut on 3 February 2026, in a CONCACAF Champions League match against Mexican side Tigres UANL.

== Career statistics ==
As of 7 April 2026

Appearances and goals by club, season and competition
Club	Season	League			Playoffs		National cup		Continental		Total	
Club	Season	Division	Apps	Goals	Apps	Goals	Apps	Goals	Apps	Goals	Apps	Goals
Platges de Calvià	2025–26	Tercera Federación	7	2	—		—		—		7	2
Forge FC	2026	Canadian Premier League	1	0	0	0	0	0	2	0	3	0
Career total			8	2	0	0	0	0	2	0	10	2

== Honours ==
Forge FC

- Canadian Championship: 2026
