= Victor Akinwale =

English footballer (born 2004)

Personal information
- Full name: Victor Tolulope Oluwatosin Akinwale
- Date of birth: 6 August 2004 (age 22)
- Place of birth: London, England
- Height: 1.79 m (5 ft 10 in)
- Position: Forward

Team information
- Current team: HFX Wanderers FC
- Number: 9

Youth career
- 2017–2026: Crystal Palace

Senior career*
Years	Team	Apps	(Gls)
2022–2025	Crystal Palace	0	(0)
2025	→ Eastbourne Borough (loan)	11	(0)
2026–	HFX Wanderers	8	(0)

International career
2021	England U18	2	(0)
2022	England U17	2	(2)
- * Club domestic league appearances and goals as of 29 June 2026

Victor Tolulope Oluwatosin Akinwale (born 6 August 2004) is an English professional footballer who plays as a forward for HFX Wanderers in the Canadian Premier League.

== Early life ==
Akinwale was born in England and is of Nigerian descent. He developed as a footballer from a young age before joining the academy of Crystal Palace.

== Club career ==
=== Crystal Palace ===
Akinwale joined the academy of Crystal Palace in 2021 and progressed through the club's youth system. He became a prolific goalscorer at under-18 level and featured in the Under-18 Premier League South.

He later progressed to the club’s under-21 side, competing in Premier League 2.

=== Loan to Eastbourne Borough ===
In order to gain senior experience, Akinwale joined National League South club Eastbourne Borough on loan in 2025.

=== HFX Wanderers ===
In February 2026, Akinwale joined HFX Wanderers.

== International career ==
Akinwale is eligible to represent both England through birthplace and Nigeria due to ancestry at international level. In June 2022 he scored goals for England U17 against Norway and USA.

== Style of play ==
Akinwale plays primarily as a centre-forward. He is known for his pace, movement off the ball, finishing ability, and pressing from the front.

== Personal life ==
Akinwale holds English nationality and is of Nigerian heritage.

== Career statistics ==
As of match played 30 May 2026

Appearances and goals by club, season and competition
Club	Season	League			National Cup		Other		Total	
Club	Season	Division	Apps	Goals	Apps	Goals	Apps	Goals	Apps	Goals
Eastbourne Borough (loan)	2025–26	National League South	10	0	0	0	1 (Note: Appearance(s) in the FA Trophy)	1	11	1
HFX Wanderers	2026	Canadian Premier League	6	0	1 (Note: Appearance(s) in the Canadian Championship)	0	0	0	7	0
Career total			16	0	1	0	1	1	18	1
