= Finn Linder =

New Zealand footballer (born 2004)

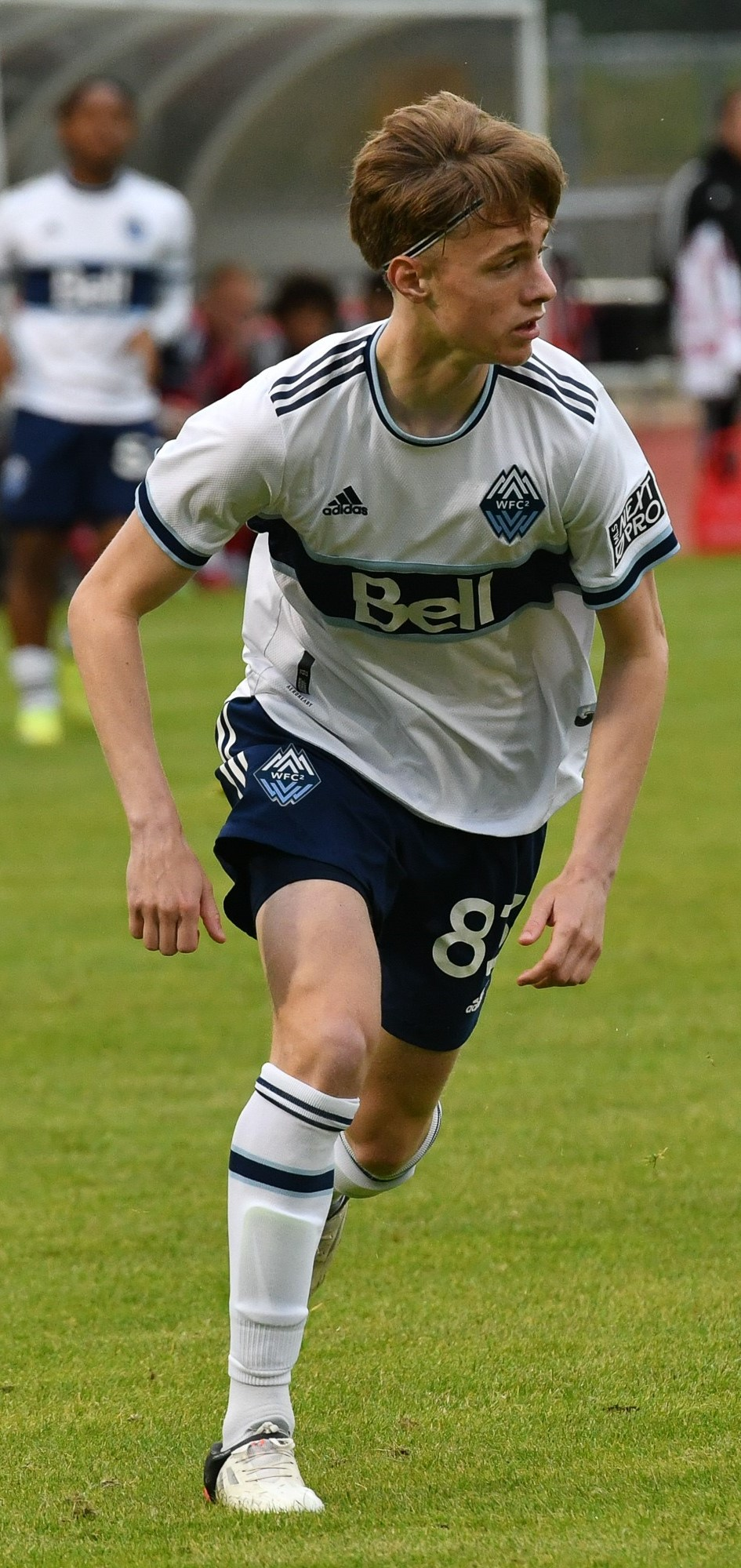

Personal information
- Date of birth: May 6, 2004 (age 22)
- Place of birth: Calgary, Alberta, Canada
- Height: 6 ft 3 in (1.91 m)
- Position: Centre-back

Team information
- Current team: HFX Wanderers FC
- Number: 2

Youth career
- 2013–2017: Calgary Blizzard SC
- 2018–2020: Whitecaps FC Alberta Academy
- 2020–2021: Vancouver Whitecaps FC

Senior career*
Years	Team	Apps	(Gls)
2022–2025	Whitecaps FC 2	44	(2)
2024	→ Vancouver Whitecaps FC (loan)	0	(0)
2026–	HFX Wanderers FC	24	(1)

International career^{‡}
2023	New Zealand U20	2	(0)
2023	New Zealand U23	1	(0)
- * Club domestic league appearances and goals as of October 24, 2026 ‡ National team caps and goals as of September 14, 2026

Finn Linder (born May 6, 2004) is a professional footballer who plays as a centre-back for HFX Wanderers FC. Born in Canada, he represents New Zealand at international level.

== Early life ==
Linder began playing youth soccer with Calgary Blizzard SC at age eight. In 2017, he was invited to trial with the English club Wigan's academy program. In December 2017, he was selected to join the Vancouver Whitecaps FC Alberta Academy Centre. He was named to Team Alberta in both 2017 and 2018 where he made the team of distinction. In 2020, he moved to Vancouver to join the Vancouver Whitecaps FC Academy.

== Club career ==
In March 2022, Linder signed a professional contract with Whitecaps FC 2 in MLS Next Pro. On June 12, 2022, he scored his first professional goal in a 2-2 draw against the Tacoma Defiance. At the end of the 2022 season, the club picked up his option for the 2023 season. After the 2023 season, he signed an extension for the 2024 season. In 2024, he signed three short-term loans with the Vancouver Whitecaps FC first team. On July 27, he made his first appearance with the first team in a friendly against Welsh side Wrexham AFC. On August 3, 2024, he made his first team debut in an official match, during a 2024 Leagues Cup match against Mexican side Tijuana. After the 2024 season, his option was picked up for 2025. He missed the 2025 season with an ACL injury.

In January 2026, he signed with Canadian Premier League club HFX Wanderers FC for the 2026 season, with options for 2027 and 2028.

== International career ==
Born in Canada, Linder has German and New Zealand heritage through his parents.

In March 2023, he was called up to the New Zealand U23 squad for a friendly series against China U23. In May 2023, he was named to the New Zealand U20 squad for the 2023 FIFA U-20 World Cup. He made his debut for the U20s on May 26, in the final group stage match against Argentina U20.

== Career statistics ==
As of August 12, 2026

Appearances and goals by club, season and competition
Club	Season	League			Playoffs		National cup (Note: Includes Canadian Championship)		Other		Total	
Club	Season	Division	Apps	Goals	Apps	Goals	Apps	Goals	Apps	Goals	Apps	Goals
Whitecaps FC 2	2022	MLS Next Pro	12	1	—		—		—		12	1
Whitecaps FC 2	2023	MLS Next Pro	10	1	—		—		—		10	1
Whitecaps FC 2	2024	MLS Next Pro	23	0	1	0	—		—		23	0
Whitecaps FC 2	2025	MLS Next Pro	0	0	0	0	—		—		0	0
Whitecaps FC 2	Total		45	2	1	0	0	0	0	0	45	2
Vancouver Whitecaps FC (loan)	2024	Major League Soccer	0	0	0	0	0	0	1 (Note: Appearance(s) in Leagues Cup)	0	1	0
HFX Wanderers FC	2026	Canadian Premier League	21	1	—		1	0	—		21	1
Career total			66	3	1	0	1	0	1	0	66	3
