= Bobby Smyrniotis =

Canadian soccer coach (born 1979)

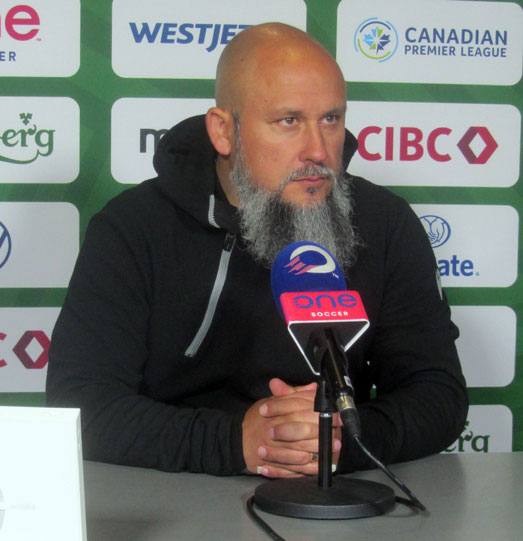
- Smyrniotis in 2023

Personal information
- Full name: Haralambos Smyrniotis
- Date of birth: April 24, 1979 (age 47)
- Place of birth: Scarborough, Ontario, Canada

Team information
- Current team: Forge FC (head coach)

College career
Years	Team	Apps	(Gls)
- Charleston Cougars
- York Lions

Managerial career
- 2003–2004: Olympiacos (academy)
- 2005–2018: Sigma FC
- 2018–: Forge FC

Haralambos "Bobby" Smyrniotis (born April 24, 1979) is a Canadian soccer coach and former player who works as head coach of Forge FC of the Canadian Premier League. Smyrniotis is the co-founder of the Sigma FC soccer academy based in Mississauga.

== Playing career ==
Smyrniotis played for the College of Charleston and York University.

== Coaching career ==
=== Early career ===
In 2003 and 2004, Smyrniotis was a coach in the academy system of Olympiacos. He co-founded Sigma FC, and was the team's head coach from 2005 to 2018.

=== Forge FC ===
==== 2019 season ====
On October 1, 2018, Smyrniotis was announced as the first head coach and technical director of Canadian Premier League club Forge FC. During the 2019 season, Forge finished in second place during the Spring and Fall Seasons, both times behind Cavalry FC. He became the first coach to win the Canadian Premier League when Forge defeated Cavalry FC in the 2019 Canadian Premier League Finals. Also during the 2019 season, Forge were knocked out in the second qualifying round of the Canadian Championship. They also played in the CONCACAF League where they were knocked out in the Round of 16.

==== 2020–present ====
Smyrniotis returned to coach Forge FC for the 2020 season. The 2020 Canadian Premier League season was played in three rounds. Forge qualified for the next round after finishing the first round in third place then qualified for the championship match after finishing in first place in the second round. Forge repeated as league champions after a 2–0 win in the Championship final against HFX Wanderers.

In the 2021 CONCACAF League, Smyrniotis guided Forge FC to the semi-finals, qualifying the club for the CONCACAF Champions League for the first time in its history.

In May 2023, Smyrniotis signed a four-year contract extension with Forge. He also became the club's sporting director in addition to his role as head coach. In 2024, Smyrniotis was nominated for Canadian Premier League Coach of the Year for a sixth consecutive season, ultimately winning the award for the first time. In 2025, he was named the Coach of the Year, for the second consecutive season.

== Coaching statistics ==
As of game played November 9, 2024

Team	From	To	Record								Ref.
Team	From	To	M	W	D	L	GF	GA	GD	Win %	Ref.
Sigma FC	2014	September 30, 2018	117	72	24	21	238	135	+103	61.54	
Forge FC	October 1, 2018	present	198	100	42	56	294	195	+99	50.51	
Total			315	172	66	77	532	330	+202	54.60	—

== Personal life ==
Born in Canada, Smyrniotis is of Greek descent. He received a Specialized Honours Bachelor of Arts degree in Kinesiology & Health Science from York University and a Master of Science degree in Sports Management from the University of Louisville.

Bobby and his brother Costa Smyrniotis were both co-founders of Sigma FC. The brothers also worked together at Forge FC where Costa was the director of football until 2023.

== Honours ==
=== Coach ===
Forge FC

- Canadian Premier League: 2019, 2020, 2022, 2023
- Canadian Premier League regular season: 2021, 2024, 2025
- Canadian Championship: 2026
- Canadian Premier League Coach of the Year: 2024, 2025
