= Noah Bickford =

Canadian soccer player

Personal information
- Full name: Noah Bickford
- Date of birth: February 28, 2004 (age 22)
- Place of birth: Milton, Ontario, Canada
- Height: 1.93 m (6 ft 4 in)
- Position: Defender

Team information
- Current team: Sigma FC

Youth career
- Milton Magic FC

College career
Years	Team	Apps	(Gls)
2022–23	Oakland Golden Grizzlies	8	(0)
2025–	TMU Bold	12	(2)

Senior career*
Years	Team	Apps	(Gls)
2021–22	Scrosoppi FC	17	(2)
2024	ProStars FC	19	(1)
2025	Simcoe County Rovers FC	18	(0)
2026	Forge FC	2	(0)
2026–	Sigma FC	5	(0)
- * Club domestic league appearances and goals as of May 19, 2026

Noah Bickford (born February 28, 2004) is a Canadian soccer player who plays as a defender for Sigma FC in the Ontario Premier League.

== Early life ==
In 2009, Bickford began playing youth soccer with the Milton Magic FC. Over the next 10 years with the youth club, he won three Ontario Cup titles at the U14, U15, and U17 levels.

Bickford played for the Oakland Golden Grizzlies at the NCAA Division I college level in the 2022 and 2023 seasons, before joining the TMU Bold U Sports team for the 2025 season.

== Club career ==
From 2021 to 2025, Bickford played with semi-professional clubs Scrosoppi FC, ProStars FC, and captained Simcoe County Rovers FC in League1 Ontario.

In the 2026 CPL–U Sports Draft, Forge FC drafted Bickford in Round 1 with the 8th overall pick. In February 2026, Bickford signed for Forge on a short-term contract ahead of the 2026 CONCACAF Champions Cup matches against Tigres UANL.

On April 3rd, 2026, Forge FC announced Bickford had signed a second short-term contract of the season for the club's first match of the 2026 Canadian Premier League season. On April 4th, 2026, Bickford made his professional debut, coming off the bench for one minute in Forge's 2–0 win over Atlético Ottawa.

== Career statistics ==
As of match played April 4, 2026

Club	Season	League			Playoffs		Domestic Cup		Total	
Club	Season	Division	Apps	Goals	Apps	Goals	Apps	Goals	Apps	Goals
Scrosoppi FC	2021	League1 Ontario	1	1	0	0	0	0	1	1
Scrosoppi FC	2022	League1 Ontario	16	1	0	0	0	0	16	1
ProStars FC	2024	League1 Ontario	19	1	0	0	1	0	20	1
Simcoe County Rovers	2025	League1 Ontario	18	0	0	0	3	1	21	1
Forge FC	2026	Canadian Premier League	1	0	0	0	0	0	1	0
Career total			55	3	0	0	4	1	59	4
