= Harvey Hughes =

English footballer (born 2000)

Personal information
- Date of birth: 20 December 2003 (age 22)
- Place of birth: Lyndhurst, Hampshire, England
- Height: 1.83 m (6 ft 0 in)
- Position: Defender

Team information
- Current team: HFX Wanderers FC
- Number: 41

Youth career
- 2017–2021: Portsmouth

College career
Years	Team	Apps	(Gls)
2024–	CBU Capers	23	(4)

Senior career*
Years	Team	Apps	(Gls)
2021–2022	Portsmouth	0	(0)
2021–2022	→ Bognor Regis Town (loan)	13	(1)
2022–2023	Blackpool	0	(0)
2022	→ Bamber Bridge (loan)	6	(0)
2023	Lewes	13	(0)
2023	AFC Totton	0	(0)
2024	Dorchester Town	2	(1)
2024	→ AFC Portchester (dual-registration)		
2025	Calgary Foothills FC	14	(2)
2026–	HFX Wanderers FC	1	(0)
- * Club domestic league appearances and goals as of 29 June 2026

Harvey Hughes (born 20 December 2003) is an English professional footballer who plays for HFX Wanderers FC in the Canadian Premier League.

== Early life ==
Hughes joined the Portsmouth Academy when he was 13. In April 2019, Hughes was named the CEFA (Community & Education Football Alliance) Male Player of the Season at the 2019 EFL Awards.

== University career ==
In 2024, Hughes moved to Canada to attend Cape Breton University, where he joined the men's soccer team. He was named the team's Rookie of the Year in 2024. In 2025, he was named an AUS Second Team All-Star.

== Club career ==
=== England ===
On 9 November 2021, Hughes made his senior debut with Portsmouth in the 2021–22 EFL Trophy against Crystal Palace U21. In late December 2021, he joined Bognor Regis Town on loan in the seventh tier Isthmian League Premier. He went on trial with Brighton & Hove Albion in April 2022, after his scholarship contract with Portsmouth expired and was not renewed.

In July 2022, he joined Blackpool on a one-year contract to join their developmental side in the Central League, but featured with the first team in pre-season. In August 2022, he was loaned to Bamber Bridge for one month in the seventh tier Northern Premier League Premier Division. At the end of the season, he was released by Blackpool.

In August 2023, he signed with Lewes in the seventh tier Isthmian League Premier. In December 2023, he joined AFC Totton in the seventh tier Southern Football League Premier Division South. In January 2024, he signed with Dorchester Town in the seventh tier Southern Football League Premier Division South. In February 2024, he joined AFC Portchester in the ninth tier Wessex Football League Premier Division on a dual-registration deal, allowing him to play for both sides.

=== Canada ===
At the 2025 CPL-U Sports Draft, he was selected in the first round (eighth overall) by Cavalry FC. However, he suffered a quad strain in the first weeks of pre-season, which led to him not signing a contract. He subsequently played with Calgary Foothills FC in League1 Alberta.

At the 2026 CPL-U Sports Draft, he was selected in the first round (sixth overall) by HFX Wanderers FC. In March 2026, he signed a U Sports contract with the club, allowing him to maintain his university eligibility.

== Career statistics ==
As of 19 April 2026

Appearances and goals by club, season and competition
Club	Season	League			Domestic Cup		Other		Total	
Club	Season	Division	Apps	Goals	Apps	Goals	Apps	Goals	Apps	Goals
Portsmouth	2021–22	EFL League One	0	0	0	0	1 (Note: Appearances in FA Trophy)	0	1	0
Bognor Regis Town (loan)	2021–22	Isthmian League Premier	13	1	0	0	1 (Note: Appearance in Sussex Senior Cup)	0	14	1
Blackpool	2022–23	EFL Championship	0	0	0	0	0	0	0	0
Bamber Bridge (loan)	2022–23	Northern Premier League Premier	6	0	0	0	0	0	6	0
Lewes	2023–24	Isthmian League Premier	13	0	3	0	3	1	19	1
AFC Totton	2023–24	Southern Football League Premier Division South	0	0	0	0	1 (Note: Appearance in Southampton Senior Cup)	0	1	0
Dorchester Town F.C.	2023–24	Southern Football League Premier Division South	2	0	0	0	0	0	2	0
AFC Portchester (dual registration)	2023–24	Wessex Football League Premier	?	?	0	0	?	?	?	?
Calgary Foothills FC	2025	League1 Alberta	14	2	—		—		14	2
HFX Wanderers FC	2026	Canadian Premier League	0	0	0	0	0	0	0	0
Career total			48	3	3	0	6	1	57	4
