= Raymond Verheijen =

Dutch football coach (born 1971)

Personal information
- Date of birth: 23 November 1971 (age 54)

Raymond Verheijen (born 23 November 1971) is a Dutch professional football coach.

== Career ==
Verheijen wrote a book called Complete Handbook of Conditioning for Soccer.

He has been a member of the coaching staff of the national teams at three World Cups and three European Championships, with Netherlands, and South Korea and Russia, who were both managed by Guus Hiddink at the times of the appointments.

He has also worked with a number of European club sides, including Barcelona of Spain, Zenit Saint Petersburg of Russia, English teams Chelsea F.C and Manchester City, and Australian team Brisbane Roar. He has also been a personal fitness coach to Craig Bellamy during his spells at Manchester City and Cardiff City, and advised Bayern Munich about the fitness of Arjen Robben.

Primarily a fitness coach, Verheijen has publicly criticised the training methods of a number of English teams, such as London-based clubs Chelsea, Arsenal and Tottenham Hotspur, as well as former club Manchester City. Earlier in his career, Verheijen publicly criticised the coaching methods of Dutch team Feyenoord, but returned there to advise on pre-season build up in July 2011.

In July 2013, he criticised the training methods of new Manchester United manager David Moyes and his coaches after an injury suffered to countryman Robin van Persie during pre-season training. He claimed Moyes was a "dinosaur" and that Van Persie had been "overtrained". Verheijen had previously made "scathing remarks" when news broke of Moyes' appointment in May. In December 2013, following further muscle injuries to Van Persie, Verheijen again criticised the training methods of Moyes, saying that, with regards to the overtraining he had detailed in July, "you don't have to be Einstein to understand that is gambling". In March 2016 Verheijen levelled a similar accusation against Real Madrid regarding Gareth Bale.

He has also repeatedly criticised the high-intensity methods of coach Jürgen Klopp, at both Borussia Dortmund and Liverpool, for example his lack of sports periodization.

=== Wales national team ===
Verheijen was appointed to the position of Assistant Manager to the Wales national team in February 2011, managed at the time by Gary Speed and in March 2011 made the news for his use of Twitter.

Two weeks after the death of Wales' national team manager Gary Speed, Verheijen said that he would like to become the new Wales manager and continue Speed's legacy (he described it as "Gary's wish"). His comments courted controversy, Speed had been buried two days earlier and the comments were considered by some to be inappropriate. They were described as "selfish" by former Wales international Iwan Roberts. In January 2012, he suggested that Wales should hire a foreigner as their new manager. On 19 January 2012, Chris Coleman was appointed Wales team manager as successor to his friend Gary Speed. Verheijen's contract was due to expire at the end of 2011, but he remained in the position until February 2012, when he resigned. In December 2012 Verheijen criticised the FAW, stating that they had "destroyed" the "legacy" of Gary Speed. On 10 October 2015, Wales' qualification for UEFA Euro 2016 was confirmed, meaning that Coleman had led Wales to their first tournament qualification since 1958.
