= Lucas Olguin =

Canadian soccer player (born 2005)

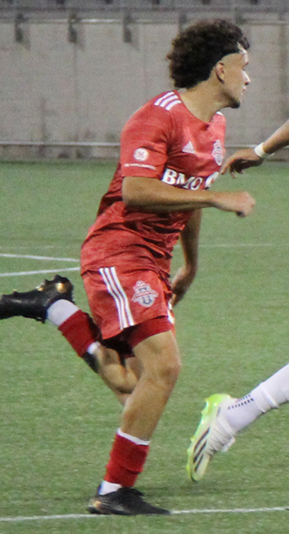
- Olguin in 2023

Personal information
- Date of birth: September 26, 2005 (age 21)
- Place of birth: Vaughan, Ontario, Canada
- Height: 5 ft 7 in (1.70 m)
- Position: Midfielder

Team information
- Current team: HFX Wanderers FC

Youth career
- Glen Shields FC
- 2015–2023: Toronto FC

Senior career*
Years	Team	Apps	(Gls)
2021	Toronto FC IV	6	(1)
2023–2025	Toronto FC II	74	(0)
2026–	HFX Wanderers FC	23	(1)
- * Club domestic league appearances and goals as of October 26, 2026

Lucas Olguin (born September 26, 2005) is a Canadian professional soccer player who plays as a centre-mid for HFX Wanderers FC in the Canadian Premier League.

== Early life ==
Olguin is the son of an Argentinian father and Cuban mother. Olguin played youth soccer with Glen Shields FC for four years, before joining the Toronto FC Academy in February 2015. He played with Team Ontario at the 2022 Canada Summer Games winning a silver medal and being named to the tournament All-Star Team.

== Club career ==
On March 27, 2023, Olguin made his professional debut with Toronto FC II in MLS Next Pro as an academy callup against FC Cincinnati 2. In March 2024, he signed a professional contract with the team.

In January 2026, he signed a one-year contract, with options for 2027 and 2028 with HFX Wanderers FC in the Canadian Premier League.

== Career statistics ==
As of October 12, 2025

Club	Season	League			Playoffs		Domestic Cup		Other		Total	
Club	Season	Division	Apps	Goals	Apps	Goals	Apps	Goals	Apps	Goals	Apps	Goals
Toronto FC IV	2021	League1 Ontario Summer Championship	6	1	–		–		–		6	1
Toronto FC II	2023	MLS Next Pro	24	0	–		–		–		24	0
Toronto FC II	2024	MLS Next Pro	27	0	–		–		–		27	0
Toronto FC II	2025	MLS Next Pro	23	0	–		–		–		23	0
Toronto FC II	Total		74	0	0	0	0	0	0	0	74	0
Career total			80	1	0	0	0	0	0	0	80	1
