= Sven Zitman =

Dutch footballer (born 2002)

Personal information
- Full name: Sven Rowan Zitman
- Date of birth: 24 February 2002 (age 24)
- Place of birth: Schiedam, Netherlands
- Position: Midfielder

Team information
- Current team: HFX Wanderers FC

Youth career
- 2006–2011: Excelsior '20
- 2011–2022: Feyenoord
- 2022: PEC Zwolle

Senior career*
| Years | Team | Apps | (Gls) |
| 2022–2023 | PEC Zwolle | 11 | (1) |
| 2023–2025 | TOP Oss | 38 | (0) |
| 2026- | HFX Wanderers | 6 | (0) |
- * Club domestic league appearances and goals as of 16 May 2025

Sven Rowan Zitman (born 24 February 2002) is a Dutch professional footballer who plays as a midfielder for Canadian club HFX Wanderers FC.

== Early life ==
Zitman was born in Schiedam, South Holland, and started playing football as a four-year-old at local club Excelsior '20.

== Club career ==
=== Feyenoord ===
He joined Feyenoord's youth academy from Excelsior '20 at the age of 10 years-old. On 19 November 2020, he signed his first professional contract with Feyenoord, keeping him at the club until the summer of 2021. In March 2022, he left Feyenoord on a free transfer before making his debut senior appearance.

=== PEC Zwolle ===
Zitman joined up with PEC Zwolle, and in October 2022 signed a two-and-a-half-year professional contract with the club. He made his senior league debut on 7 October 2022 in a 3–0 defeat against FC Dordrecht. Zitman himself said he was surprised by his fast introduction to the first team as he had been expecting to play youth team football for a longer time period after joining the club. He scored his first professional goal for PEC Zwolle in a 3–2 away win in the Eerste Divisie against Helmond Sport on 19 May 2023, with his goal coming in injury time as his club came from 2–1 down to win, with his goal proving to be the winner. He made eleven appearances for the club in the 2022–23 season as the club secured promotion to the Eredivisie, with the injury time winner over Helmond proving to be fii final appearance for the club.

=== Top OSS ===
On 16 August 2023, Zitman signed with TOP Oss on a two-year contract, with the option of an extra year. He made his debut for TOP Oss in the Eerste Divisie as a starter in a 4–1 home win against Jong PSV on 18 August 2023.

=== HFX Wanderers ===
In January 2026, Zitman signed for Canadian Premier League club HFX Wanderers FC.
