= Marco Carducci =

Canadian soccer player (born 1996)

- Carducci in 2026

Personal information
- Full name: Marco Christian Carducci
- Date of birth: September 24, 1996 (age 30)
- Place of birth: Calgary, Alberta, Canada
- Height: 1.85 m (6 ft 1 in)
- Position: Goalkeeper

Team information
- Current team: HFX Wanderers FC

Youth career
- 2000–2005: MSB United
- 2005–2006: MacKenzie FC
- 2006–2011: Calgary Villains FC
- 2011–2014: Vancouver Whitecaps FC

Senior career*
Years	Team	Apps	(Gls)
2013–2014	Vancouver Whitecaps U-23	6	(0)
2014–2016	Vancouver Whitecaps FC	0	(0)
2015–2016	→ Whitecaps FC 2 (loan)	16	(0)
2017	Rio Grande Valley FC Toros	6	(0)
2018	Calgary Foothills	10	(0)
2019–2025	Cavalry FC	163	(0)
2026–	HFX Wanderers FC	26	(0)

International career^{‡}
2012–2013	Canada U17	8	(0)
2014–2015	Canada U20	5	(0)
2016	Canada U23	2	(0)
- * Club domestic league appearances and goals as of October 25, 2026 ‡ National team caps and goals as of March 29, 2017

Marco Christian Carducci (born September 24, 1996) is a Canadian professional soccer player who plays as a goalkeeper for the HFX Wanderers in the Canadian Premier League.

== Club career ==
=== Vancouver Whitecaps FC ===
Carducci signed his first professional contract with Major League Soccer's Vancouver Whitecaps FC on March 4, 2014. He made his debut on May 7, 2014, in a Canadian Championship fixture against Toronto FC, which Vancouver lost 2–1. After three seasons with the Whitecaps, two of which were on loan to their reserve club Whitecaps FC 2, the Whitecaps announced that Carducci would not return for the 2017 season.

=== Rio Grande Valley FC Toros ===
Carducci signed with USL side Rio Grande Valley FC Toros in March 2017.

=== Calgary Foothills ===
In February 2018, Carducci would turn down multiple offers from USL clubs to sign with Premier Development League club Calgary Foothills FC, serving as a goalkeeper coach in addition to playing duties. Carducci would help Calgary Foothills to the 2018 PDL Championship, winning the Golden Glove as well as being named to the 2018 PDL All-League Team.

=== Cavalry FC ===
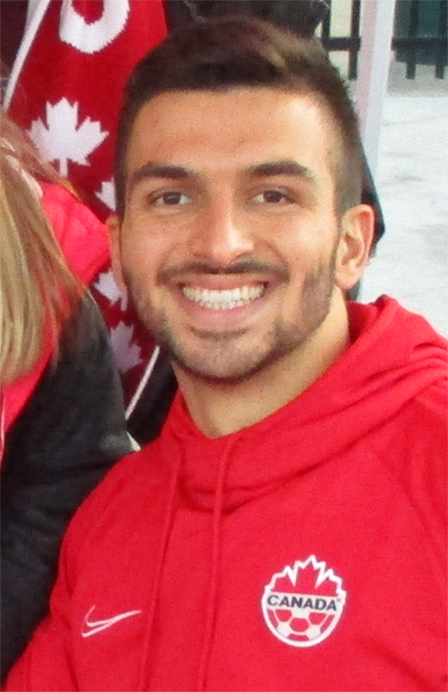
Carducci in 2019

Carducci signed for Cavalry FC of the Canadian Premier League in December 2018. Upon signing, he indicated his desire for playing time, and that his goal was to play for Canada in the 2026 World Cup with Canada as one of the three hosts. In the 2019 Canadian Premier League season, the first season in league history, Cavalry began with a seven-game winning streak, with Carducci starting in each, picking up four clean sheets in the process. The streak finally came to an end on June 22, with a 1–0 defeat against Forge FC. Cavalry also saw success in the Canadian Championship, becoming the first Canadian Premier League side to defeat MLS opposition as they defeated the struggling Vancouver Whitecaps FC 2–1 on aggregate in the quarterfinals. Carducci was instrumental in this victory, posting a clean sheet in the first leg and only conceding one goal in the second against his former club. In the semi-finals, however, they were knocked out of the tournament at the hands of the Montreal Impact. Carducci backstopped Cavalry to both the spring and fall championships and a berth to the 2019 Canadian Premier League Finals, where they faced Forge. In the first leg, Carducci was widely praised for his performance as he saved a Tristan Borges penalty to keep the score at zero, but Borges ended up scoring at the very end of the first half and the match ended at 1-0 for Forge. In the second leg, Cavalry was unable to score, and during stoppage time, with all the Cavalry defenders in the attacking zone, Forge players Elimane Cissé and David Choinière ran the length of a field on a 2 on 0, and there was not much Carducci could do to stop it. Choinière scored, and Forge won the championship. Despite losing the championship, Carducci had a good individual season, he finished with 9 clean sheets, tied with Triston Henry for the most in the league. Carducci would win the CPL goalkeeper of the year for the 2019 season.

Cavalry later confirmed that Carducci would return for the 2020 season. In the shortened season Carducci finished with three clean sheets in nine games, as his team finished the season in third place. He extended his contract for the 2021 and 2022 seasons.

In March 2022, Carducci would announce that he had been diagnosed with testicular cancer the prior month, and was recovery after having surgery to treat the issue shortly after. After serving as the team's backup for the first 3 games of the 2022 season, he would return to the net on May 1, 2022, posting a clean sheet against Pacific FC in his return. After his strong 2022 season with Cavalry, Carducci would win his second Golden Glove award. In May 2023, Carducci would be the first player to make 100 appearances for Cavalry. He departed the club at the end of the 2025 season, having made a total 193 appearances and recorded 67 clean sheets throughout his seven seasons at the club.

=== HFX Wanderers ===
On December 22, 2025, Carducci officially signed with the HFX Wanderers in the Canadian Premier League on a two-year contract through the 2027 season.

== International career ==
Carducci was born in Canada to a Canadian-Italian father and Uruguayan mother. He has represented Canada at various youth levels. He was on the Canadian team that went to the 2013 FIFA U-17 World Cup. In May 2014, he was named to the Canadian U-20 team that would participate in the Milk Cup later that summer. He played one game at the tournament, with his Vancouver Whitecaps compatriot Nolan Wirth playing the other two. Carducci would later participate again with the U20s in November, where he played two games against England and Russia in a 2–2 draw and a 2–1 victory, respectively.

In May 2016, Carducci was called to Canada's U23 national team for a pair of friendlies against Guyana and Grenada. Carducci started the second match against Grenada, posting the clean sheet

On August 28, 2019, Carducci was called up to the Canada men's national soccer team for a pair of CONCACAF Nations League matches against Cuba, his first call up as well as the first call up for any Canadian Premier League player.

== Career statistics ==
As of November 5, 2026

Appearances and goals by club, season and competition
Club	Season	League			Playoffs		Cup		Continental		Total	
Club	Season	Division	Apps	Goals	Apps	Goals	Apps	Goals	Apps	Goals	Apps	Goals
Vancouver Whitecaps FC	2014	Major League Soccer	0	0	0	0	2	0	0	0	2	0
Whitecaps FC 2 (loan)	2015	USL	9	0	0	0	0	0	—		9	0
Whitecaps FC 2 (loan)	2016	USL	7	0	0	0	0	0	—		7	0
Whitecaps FC 2 (loan)	Total		16	0	0	0	0	0	—		16	0
Rio Grande Valley FC Toros	2017	USL	6	0	0	0	0	0	—		6	0
Calgary Foothills	2018	Premier Development League	10	0	4	0	0	0	—		14	0
Cavalry FC	2019	Canadian Premier League	23	0	2	0	4	0	—		29	0
Cavalry FC	2020	Canadian Premier League	9	0	—		—		—		9	0
Cavalry FC	2021	Canadian Premier League	24	0	1	0	1	0	—		26	0
Cavalry FC	2022	Canadian Premier League	24	0	2	0	2	0	—		28	0
Cavalry FC	2023	Canadian Premier League	28	0	3	0	1	0	—		32	0
Cavalry FC	2024	Canadian Premier League	27	0	2	0	3	0	2	0	34	0
Cavalry FC	2025	Canadian Premier League	28	0	3	0	2	0	2	0	35	0
Cavalry FC	Total		163	0	13	0	13	0	4	0	193	0
HFX Wanderers FC	2026	Canadian Premier League	26	0	0	0	1	0	0	0	27	0
Career total			221	0	17	0	16	0	4	0	258	0

== Honours ==
=== Club ===
Vancouver Whitecaps FC

- Canadian Championship: 2015

Calgary Foothills

- PDL Championship: 2018

Calvary FC

- Canadian Premier League Finals runners-up: 2019
- Canadian Premier League (Regular season) Champions: Spring 2019, Fall 2019, 2023

=== Individual ===
- CPL Goalkeeper of the Year: 2019, 2022
- PDL Goalkeeper of the Year: 2018
- Canadian U-17 Player of the Year: 2012, 2013
- Canadian Premier League Volkswagen Premier Performer: 2019
