= Anthony Aromatario =

Canadian soccer player (born 2003)

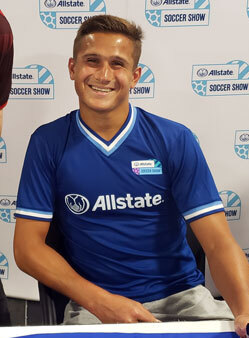
- Aromatario in 2026

Personal information
- Date of birth: April 30, 2003 (age 23)
- Place of birth: Woodbridge, Ontario, Canada
- Height: 1.77 m (5 ft 10 in)
- Position: Midfielder

Youth career
- Woodbridge Strikers
- International FC
- North Toronto Nitros
- 2021–2023: Viterbese

College career
| Years | Team | Apps | (Gls) |
| 2025– | York Lions | 17 | (0) |

Senior career*
| Years | Team | Apps | (Gls) |
| 2022–2023 | Viterbese | 0 | (0) |
| 2023–2024 | Tre Fiori | 21 | (0) |
| 2024 | North Toronto Nitros | 13 | (1) |
| 2024–2025 | TFA Dubai | | |
| 2025 | Woodbridge Strikers | 20 | (4) |
| 2026– | Forge FC | 24 | (1) |
- * Club domestic league appearances and goals as of October 25, 2026

Anthony Aromatario (born April 30, 2003) is a Canadian soccer player who plays for Forge FC in the Canadian Premier League.

== Early life ==
Aromatario played youth soccer with the Woodbridge Strikers, International FC, and the North Toronto Nitros, while also playing with the Ontario provincial team. Between 2019 and 2021, he had trials with Italian clubs Citadella, Vicenza, Este, Pescara and Frosinone. In 2021, he joined the academy of Viterbese.

== University career ==
In 2020, he committed to attend Oakland University to play for the men's soccer team, however, he ultimately went to Italy instead and joined the Viterbese academy.

In 2025, he began attending York University, where he played for the York Lions. In his first season, he helped York capture the OUA Silver medal and the U Sports national title, while also being named an OUA Second Team All-Star.

== Club career ==
In 2023, Aromatario played with Tre Fiori in the Campionato Sammarinese.

In 2024, Aromatario played with the North Toronto Nitros in League1 Ontario.

In the fall of 2024, he joined TFA Dubai in the UAE Third Division League. On October 21, 2024, he scored in a 2–1 victory over Dubai City B.

In 2025, he played with the Woodbridge Strikers. At the end of the 2025 season, he was named the League1 Ontario Premier Most Valuable Player, Midfielder of the Year, and a League First-Team All-Star.

In February 2026, Aromatario signed a short-term contract with Forge FC of the Canadian Premier League, ahead of their 2026 CONCACAF Champions Cup matches. On February 3, 2026, he made his debut against Mexican side Tigres UANL. In March 2026, he signed a U Sports contract with Forge. He made his CPL debut on April 4 against Atlético Ottawa, starting the match and earning Performance of the Match honours.

== Career statistics ==
As of June 11, 2026

| Club | Season | League | | | Playoffs | | National cup | | League Cup | | Continental | | Total | |
| Club | Season | Division | Apps | Goals | Apps | Goals | Apps | Goals | Apps | Goals | Apps | Goals | Apps | Goals |
|---|---|---|---|---|---|---|---|---|---|---|---|---|---|---|
| Viterbese | 2021–22 | Serie C | 0 | 0 | – | | – | | 0 | 0 | – | | 0 | 0 |
| Viterbese | 2022–23 | Serie C | 0 | 0 | – | | – | | 0 | 0 | – | | 0 | 0 |
| Tre Fiori | 2023–24 | Campionato Sammarinese di Calcio | 21 | 0 | – | | 4 | 0 | – | | – | | 25 | 0 |
| North Toronto Nitros | 2024 | League1 Ontario Premier | 13 | 1 | – | | – | | 1 | 0 | – | | 14 | 1 |
| Woodbridge Strikers | 2025 | League1 Ontario Premier | 20 | 4 | – | | – | | 3 | 1 | – | | 23 | 5 |
| Forge FC | 2026 | Canadian Premier League | 10 | 0 | 0 | 0 | 1 | 0 | – | | 2 | 0 | 13 | 0 |
| Career total | | | 64 | 5 | 0 | 0 | 5 | 0 | 4 | 1 | 2 | 0 | 75 | 6 |
