= Aghilas Sadek =

Algerian footballer (born 2008)

Personal information
- Full name: Aghilas Abdelmalek Sadek
- Date of birth: July 5, 2008 (age 18)
- Place of birth: El Harrach, Algeria
- Height: 1.81 m (5 ft 11 1/2 in)
- Position: Winger

Team information
- Current team: Forge FC
- Number: 26

Youth career
- CS Longueuil
- 2023–2026: CF Montréal

Senior career*
Years	Team	Apps	(Gls)
2026–	Forge FC	18	(2)

International career^{‡}
2021–	Canada U20	4	(1)
- * Club domestic league appearances and goals as of October 25, 2026 ‡ National team caps and goals as of October 17, 2026

Aghilas Abdelmalek Sadek (born July 5, 2008 in El Harrach, Algiers) is an footballer who plays for Forge FC in the Canadian Premier League. Born in Algeria, he represents Canada internationally.

== Club Career ==
Sadek was one of two academy players invited to CF Montréal's 2026 preseason camps in Marbella, Spain, and Bradenton, Florida.

== Honours ==
Forge FC

- Canadian Championship: 2026
