= HFX Wanderers FC =

Canadian professional soccer club based in Halifax

- Full name: Halifax Wanderers Football Club
- Short name: HFX Wanderers
- Founded: May 5, 2018; 8 years ago
- Stadium: Wanderers Grounds; Halifax, Nova Scotia
- Capacity: 7,500
- Owner(s): Sports & Entertainment Atlantic
- President: Derek Martin
- Manager: Vanni Sartini
- League: Canadian Premier League
- 2026: Regular season: 7th Playoffs: Did not qualify
- Website: https://www.canpl.ca/hfxwanderersfc
Home colours	Away colours

Halifax Wanderers FC, also written as HFX Wanderers FC, is a Canadian professional soccer club in Halifax, Nova Scotia. The club competes in the Canadian Premier League (CPL) at the top of the Canadian soccer league system, and play their home matches at Wanderers Grounds.

== History ==
=== Foundation ===
In December 2016, Sports & Entertainment Atlantic owner Derek Martin met with Canadian Premier League officials to discuss launching a franchise in Halifax. Martin pitched the idea of a pop-up stadium to Halifax City Councillors in March 2017, and approval was given three months later. On May 5, 2018, Halifax was one of four groups accepted by the Canadian Soccer Association for professional club membership.

HFX Wanderers Football Club was officially unveiled on May 25, 2018, as the third team to join the Canadian Premier League. As well as confirming their place in the league for the 2019 launch season, the club also revealed their crest, colours and branding. Stephen Hart was also announced as the club's inaugural manager.

On July 28, 2018, HFX Wanderers FC fielded an Atlantic Selects team to play a friendly against Fortuna Düsseldorf's under-21 squad at Wanderers Grounds. The Atlantic Selects won on penalties after a 2–2 score in regulation time. The official attendance was 4,809.

=== First seasons ===
The club played its first league match on April 28, 2019, a 0–1 away loss to Pacific FC. On May 4, 2019, the team defeated Forge FC 2–1 for its first-ever league victory. Trinidadian international Akeem Garcia opened the scoring and became the first league goal scorer in club history.

The 2020 season was shortened and modified because of the COVID-19 pandemic and branded as The Island Games because all matches were held on Prince Edward Island. The Wanderers advanced to the final, falling 0–2 to Forge FC in the final match. Akeem Garcia won the Golden Boot with six goals and Stephen Hart won the CPL's Coach of the Year award.

The 2021 season was also modified due to COVID-19 health restrictions, and the first portion of the season was held entirely at IG Field in Winnipeg, Manitoba. Upon returning to Halifax, the Wanderers were only able to play in front of season ticket holders in order to limit crowd sizes. Finally, the public was once again allowed to purchase tickets to the Canadian Championship game against CF Montréal, and the 6,413 spectators set a new attendance record. Although the Wanderers finished the season in 6th place, João Morelli won the league's Golden Boot by scoring 14 goals, a CPL record at the time, and the CPL Player of the Year award.

In April 2022 in the second match of the season, star striker Morelli suffered a season-ending ACL injury in a match against Atlético Ottawa. After the disappointing 2022 campaign, Stephen Hart was relieved as team manager, and Patrice Gheisar was brought in to replace him. It was announced in March 2023 that Morelli would miss at least the first half of the 2023 season as he recovered from the previous year's surgery. Despite this setback, the club had their most successful regular season in 2023, finishing third in the standings (equal in points to 2nd place Forge FC) and hosting their first-ever home playoff match. They also set club records for wins, points, and goals in a season, and were particularly successful in home matches.

== Stadium ==
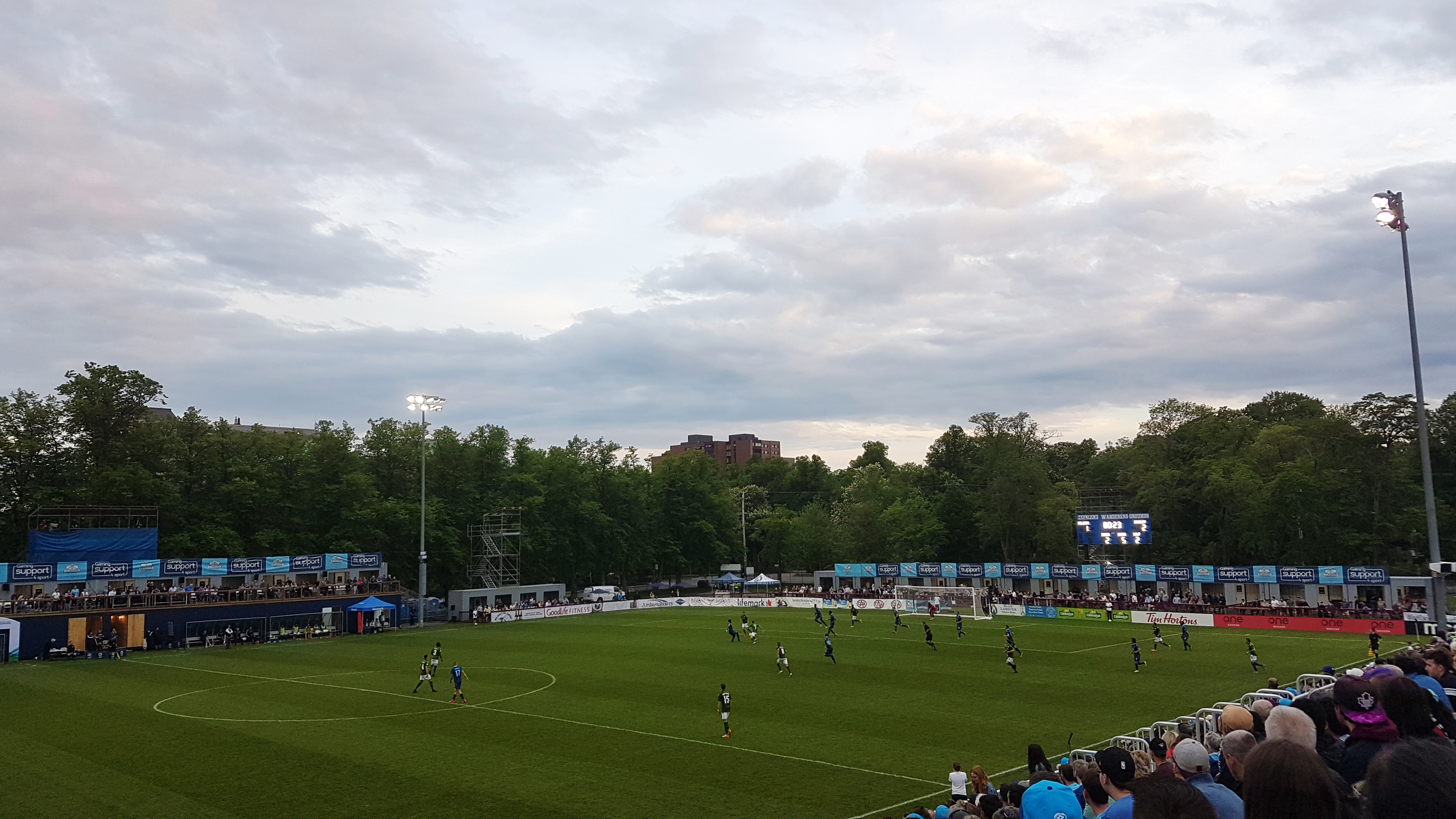
Wanderers Grounds is a stadium located in South End, Halifax

The club plays their home games at Wanderers Grounds. The modular stadium opened with a capacity of 6,500 spectators. The main grandstand (Sections 101–107) is along the north edge of the pitch, and the stands in the east end (Sections 108–111) are general admission seating, intended for the supporters groups. The general admission stands are commonly known as The Kitchen, a reference to "kitchen party", which is a common term in the region for an informal and well-attended house party.

The stadium's design allows for it to be expanded as required for future growth. Many structures are built out of shipping containers, which is an economical and flexible building option, but it also demonstrates a connection with Halifax's history as a port city. Past modifications include the addition of a patio area below The Kitchen, a premium cornerside area in the southwest portion, the installation of 18 separate entry points to maintain health protocols during the COVID-19 pandemic, a new media room installed to replace the camera platforms which were damaged in Hurricane Fiona, and a deployable giant screen.

The Wanderers Grounds is city property, and was leased to the Wanderers for a three-year test project in 2018, with the club's intention being to create a permanent stadium, should the club and league prove to be a fitting primary tenant for the site. The lease was renewed for another two years in 2021, to expire in April 2024. In September 2023, Derek Martin formally presented to Halifax city council, detailing a plan for the city to build a permanent stadium at the Wanderers Grounds. The proposed stadium would have a modular design, an initial capacity of 8,500 people, and an artificial turf which would increase its usability for other events. Including renovations to the surrounding landscape, the estimated cost to the city would be $40 million, and the Halifax Wanderers offered to sign a 30-year lease as a means of repayment. The proposal is under consideration.

== Crest and colours ==
The shape of the crest takes inspiration from the Halifax Citadel, located near the club's stadium. The crest includes the Angus L. Macdonald Bridge, which connects the Halifax Peninsula with Dartmouth, and an anchor to represent the Atlantic Ocean and Halifax Harbour.

Underneath the club's name reads the Scottish Gaelic motto, Ar Cala, Ar Dachaigh, Ar n-Anam, which translates to Our Harbour, Our Home, Our Soul. Scottish Gaelic is used to signify that Nova Scotia is one of the few places remaining where the language is still spoken.

The crest was created by Canadian graphic designer Mark Guilherme based on consultation and feedback from meetings with supporters, Halifax city leaders and local residents.

The official club colours are navy, grey, and cyan (branded by the club as "harbour blue", "naval grey", and "aqua ocean"). These colours symbolize the night sky, the Royal Canadian Navy, and the Atlantic Ocean.

=== Kit history ===
Home and away kits.

- Home

2019	2020	2021	2022	2023	2024	2025	2026

- Away

2019	2020–21	2022	2023	2024	2025	2026

=== Kit suppliers and shirt sponsors ===
HFX Wanderers kits
Period	Kit manufacturer	Shirt sponsor (chest)	Shirt sponsor (sleeve)
2019–2022	Macron	Volkswagen	None
2023–2024	Macron	Volkswagen	CIBC
2025	Macron	Volkswagen	None
2026–present	Hummel	Volkswagen	Moneris

== Club culture ==
The Wanderers are a popular CPL team, with great support within Halifax. The team recurrently tops the attendance charts, with frequent sellouts at the Wanderers Grounds, and local businesses regularly fly their flags of support on game day.

=== Supporters ===
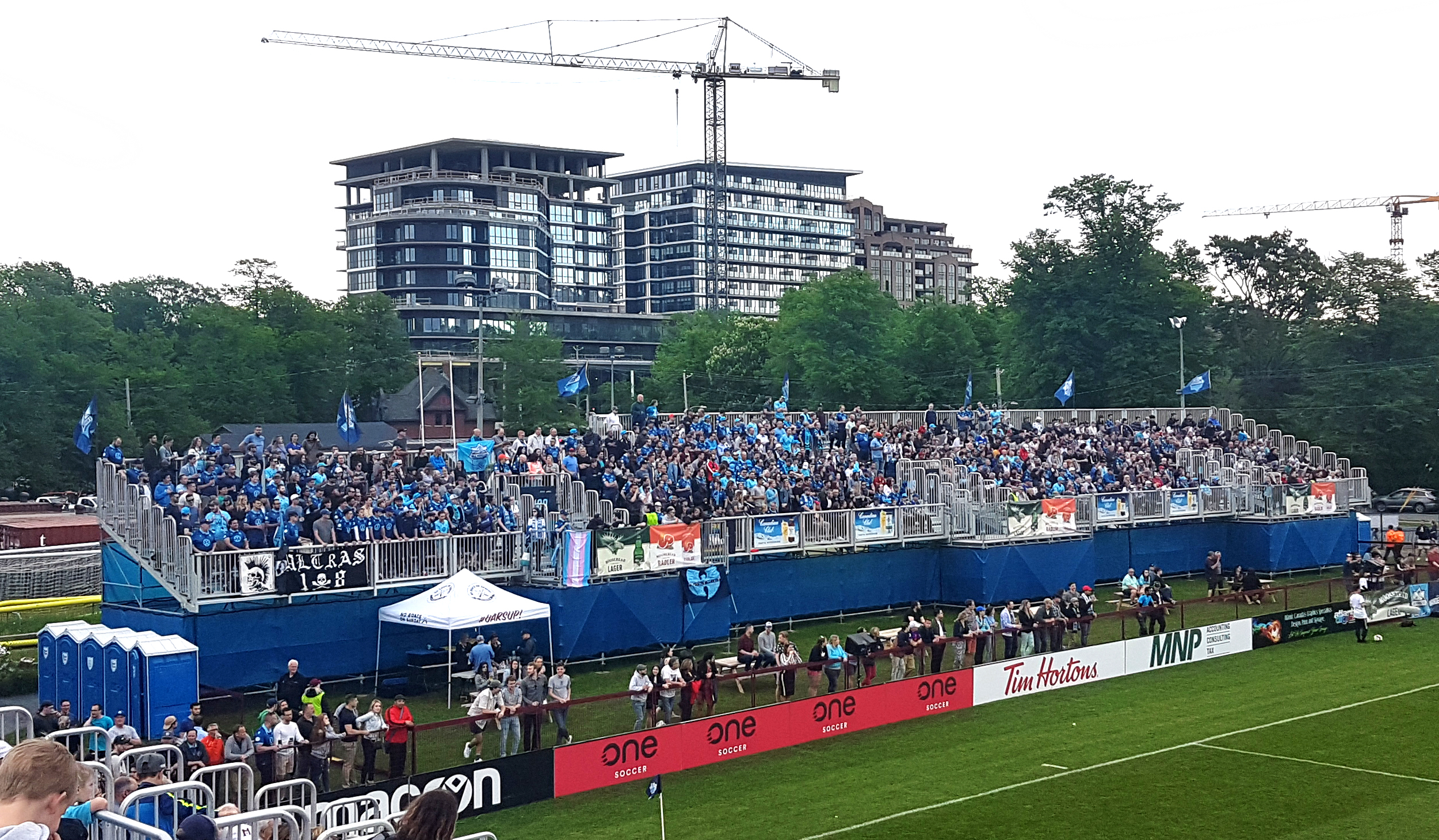
Supporters section at Wanderers Grounds.

The first supporters group to lobby for a Halifax team to join the Canadian Premier League was founded in September 2016 under the name Wanderers SG. At the launch event to unveil HFX Wanderers' identity, supporters announced they were changing their name to Privateers 1882 in order for the club to continue the Wanderers name. The 1882 signifies the year of formation for the Wanderers Amateur Athletic Club, who previously competed at the Wanderers Grounds. 'Privateers' refers to the history of privateering in the region, as well as the popular regional song "Barrett's Privateers". Other supporters groups affiliated with the Wanderers include the "Block 108 Ultras", the "Stonewall Pirates", and the "One Ten Den".

==== Social media ====
There are several long-running fan-based websites which cover the Wanderers, including "The Wanderers Notebook" and The Merchant Sailor. Local media site The Coast hosts the Wanderer Grounds (sic) podcast in addition to regular sports coverage. Most notable is the Down The Pub podcast, whose hosts have interviewed dozens of players and coaches, reviewed almost every game, and also worked with the club to co-host events. At the end of each season, the hosts award the "Pubbies" to notable players and events. Local press coverage of the Wanderers is available in Spanish through Pelota de Maple, and Josh Healey's HFX Football Post provides reviews, rumours, and interviews.

==== Travel ====
Given Halifax's distance from the other teams in the league, fan travel to away games is a relatively uncommon occurrence, although trips to Ontario are the most feasible. In 2023, Wanderers president Derek Martin queried the fans about possibly chartering a plane to a mid-week game in Toronto, and the response was so overwhelming that a plane was able to be booked almost exclusively for the use of Wanderers fans, until Porter discontinued that flight's service to Halifax.

== Honours ==
- Canadian Premier League
  - Runners-up: 2020

== Players and staff ==
=== Roster ===
As of September 11, 2026

Note: Flags indicate national team as defined under FIFA eligibility rules; some limited exceptions apply. Players may hold more than one non-FIFA nationality.

No.	Pos.	Nation	Player
1	GK	CAN	Marco Carducci
2	DF	NZL	Finn Linder
5	MF	CAN	Lucas Olguin
6	MF	FRA	Lorenzo Callegari
7	FW	TTO	Ryan Telfer
8	MF	CAN	Isaiah Johnston
9	FW	ENG	Victor Akinwale
10	FW	FRA	Yohan Baï
11	FW	CAN	Adonijah Reid
12	GK	CAN	Sinclair Astridge
14	FW	CGO	Jason Bahamboula
16	DF	CAN	Kareem Sow

No.	Pos.	Nation	Player
16	DF	CAN	Francesco Troisi
18	MF	TTO	Andre Rampersad (captain)
20	FW	CAN	Tavio Ciccarelli
21	DF	CAN	Jefferson Alphonse
22	MF	NED	Sven Zitman
23	MF	ESP	Miguel Arilla
25	MF	CAN	Liam Mackenzie
26	DF	CAN	Thomas Meilleur-Giguère
27	FW	HAI	Nelson Pierre (on loan from Vancouver Whitecaps)
33	DF	CAN	Ilan Ahmed
41	DF	ENG	Harvey Hughes
—	MF	TTO	Caden Trestrail

=== Current staff ===
As of January 17, 2025

Executive
President	(Canada) Derek Martin
Vice-president	(Canada) Peter Clark
Senior football strategy advisor	(Canada) Mark Watson
Vice President, Football Operations	(Canada) Matt Fegan
Coaching staff
Head coach	(Italy) Vanni Sartini
Assistant coach	(Northern Ireland) Daryl Fordyce
Assistant coach	(Wales) Jed Davies
Goalkeeping coach	(Trinidad and Tobago) Jan-Michael Williams
Head of Performance	(Canada) Nicolas Edwards
Head of Analysis	(Canada) Alex Sheppard

=== Head coaches ===
As of October 4, 2026

Record includes matches in the Canadian Championship and CPL playoffs.

Coach	Nation	Tenure	Record				
Coach	Nation	Tenure	G	W	D	L	Win %
Stephen Hart	Trinidad and Tobago	June 27, 2018 – October 13, 2022	105	31	31	43	29.52
Patrice Gheisar	Canada	November 30, 2022 – October 24, 2025	89	29	26	34	32.58
Vanni Sartini	Italy	December 10, 2025 –	26	7	6	13	26.92

=== Club captains ===
Years	Name	Nation
2019	Jan-Michael Williams	Trinidad and Tobago
2020–present	Andre Rampersad	Trinidad and Tobago

== Record ==
=== Year-by-year ===
Season	League												Playoffs	CC	Continental	Average attendance	Top goalscorer(s)	
Season	Div	League	Pld	W	D	L	GF	GA	GD	Pts	PPG	Pos.	Playoffs	CC	Continental	Average attendance	Name	Goals
2019	1	CPL	28	6	10	12	21	35	–14	28	1.00	7th	DNQ	R3	Ineligible	6,601	(Trinidad and Tobago) Akeem Garcia	7
2020	1	CPL	10	4	4	2	15	14	+1	16	1.60	–	RU	DNQ	DNQ	N/A	(Trinidad and Tobago) Akeem Garcia	6
2021	1	CPL	28	8	11	9	28	34	–6	35	1.25	6th	DNQ	QF	DNQ	5,198	(Brazil) João Morelli	15
2022	1	CPL	28	8	5	15	24	38	–14	29	1.04	7th	DNQ	QF	DNQ	5,825	(Canada) Samuel Salter	12
2023	1	CPL	28	11	9	8	39	32	+7	42	1.50	3rd	QF	PR	DNQ	5,854	(Canada) Massimo Ferrin	9
2024	1	CPL	28	7	9	12	37	43	–6	30	1.07	6th	DNQ	PR	DNQ	6,058	(Canada) Daniel Nimick	9
2025	1	CPL	28	11	6	11	41	34	+7	39	1.39	4th	PI	PR	DNQ	6,459	(Canada) Tiago Coimbra	13
2026	1	CPL	28	7	7	14	44	50	-6	28	1.00	7th	DNQ	PR	DNQ	5,740	(Canada) Isaiah Johnston	11

1. Average attendance include statistics from league matches only.
2. Top goalscorer(s) includes all goals scored in league season, league playoffs, Canadian Championship, CONCACAF League, and other competitive continental matches.

== Player Records ==
=== Most career goals ===
As of November 14, 2026

#	Pos.	Name	Nation	Career at club	Goals scored			
#	Pos.	Name	Nation	Career at club	CPL	CC	Int'l	Total
1	Forward	João Morelli	Brazil	2020–2023	23	1	0	**24**
2	Forward	Akeem García	Trinidad and Tobago	2019–2022	19	2	0	**21**
3	Forward	Tiago Coimbra	Canada	2023–2025	20	0	0	**20**
4	Forward	Samuel Salter	Canada	2021–2022	14	1	0	**15**
4	Defender	Dan Nimick	Canada	2023–2024	14	1	0	**15**

Note: Bold indicates active player

=== Most career assists ===
As of November 14, 2026

#	Pos.	Name	Nation	Career at club	Goals assisted			
#	Pos.	Name	Nation	Career at club	CPL	CC	Int'l	Total
1	Midfielder	**Lorenzo Callegari**	France	2023–	15	0	0	**15**
2	Defender	Wesley Timóteo	Canada	2023–2025	10	1	0	**11**
3	Forward	Massimo Ferrin	Canada	2022–2024	9	0	0	**9**
4	Midfielder	Jérémy Gagnon-Laparé	Canada	2021–2022, 2024–2025	6	2	0	**8**
4	Defender	Zachary Fernandez	Canada	2022–2024	0	0	0	**8**

Note: Bold indicates active player

=== Most career appearances ===
As of November 14, 2026

#	Pos.	Name	Nation	Career at club	Games played			
#	Pos.	Name	Nation	Career at club	CPL	CC	Int'l	Total
1	Midfielder	**Andre Rampersad**	Trinidad and Tobago	2019–	169	12	0	**181**
2	Midfielder	**Lorenzo Callegari**	France	2023–	106	4	0	**110**
3	Midfielder	Aidan Daniels	Canada	2022–2024	76	4	0	**80**
4	Midfielder	Jérémy Gagnon-Laparé	Canada	2021–2022, 2024–2025	74	4	0	**78**
5	Forward	Akeem García	Trinidad and Tobago	2019–2022	69	8	0	**77**

Note: Bold indicates active player

== See also ==
- Canadian Championship
- Nova Scotia Clippers
