= 2026 Pacific FC season =

Canadian soccer club's season of play

Pacific FC
2026 season
- Chairman: Dean Shillington
- Head coach: Terry Dunfield
- Stadium: Starlight Stadium
- Canadian Premier League: 8th
- CPL playoffs: Did not qualify
- Canadian Championship: Preliminary round

The 2026 Pacific FC season was the eighth season in the history of Pacific FC. In addition to the Canadian Premier League, the club also competed in the Canadian Championship.

After starting the season with James Merriman as head coach, after a disappointing start, Pacific announced the hiring of Terry Dunfield on May 28, who then began his coaching duties on July 7.

== Squad ==
As of July 30, 2026

No.	Player	Nationality	Position(s)	Date of birth (age)	Previous club	Notes
Goalkeepers
1	Eleias Himaras	(Canada)	GK	March 8, 2002 (age 24)	(Canada) Valour FC	
55	Sean Melvin	(Canada)	GK	July 9, 1994 (age 32)	(Canada) Atlético Ottawa	
Defenders
2	Tristan Marshall	(Saint Vincent and the Grenadines)	CB / LB	December 19, 2003 (age 22)	(Greece) Makedonikos	
3	Eric Lajeunesse	(Canada)	CB	March 10, 2003 (age 23)	(Canada) UBC Thunderbirds	U Sports
4	Diego Konincks	(Netherlands)	CB	November 30, 2000 (age 25)	(United States) Chicago Fire II	INT
5	Juan Quintana	(Colombia)	CB	November 10, 2003 (age 22)	(Colombia) Orsomarso S.C.	INT
7	Kadin Chung	(Canada)	RB	September 5, 1998 (age 28)	(Canada) Vancouver FC	
12	Joshua Belluz	(Canada)	CB	April 4, 2001 (age 25)	(United States) Colorado Rapids 2	
14	Fin Tugwell	(Canada)	CB	February 2, 2003 (age 23)	(Canada) Victoria Vikes	U Sports
15	Christian Greco-Taylor	(Canada)	LB	February 20, 2005 (age 21)	(Canada) Whitecaps FC Academy	U21
33	Matthew Baldisimo	(Philippines)	CB / DM / CM	January 20, 1998 (age 28)	(Canada) York United	
Midfielders
6	Lukas Browning Lagerfeldt	(Republic of Ireland)	CM	January 6, 1999 (age 27)	(Sweden) Gefle IF	INT
8	Aidan Daniels	(Canada)	AM	September 6, 1998 (age 28)	(Canada) HFX Wanderers	
11	Josh Heard	(Wales)	AM	November 29, 1994 (age 31)	(United States) Real Monarchs	
16	Taras Gomulka	(Australia)	CM	September 16, 2001 (age 25)	(Australia) Perth Glory	INT
21	Matteo Schiavoni	(Canada)	MF	April 5, 2005 (age 21)	(Canada) CF Montréal	U21
34	Sami Keshavarz	(Canada)	CM	August 18, 2006 (age 20)	(Canada) Van Isle Wave	U21
37	Mattias Vales	(Canada)	AM	February 29, 2008 (age 18)	(Canada) Van Isle Wave	U21, EYT
44	Marley Edwards	(Canada)	AM / FW		(United States) CSUN Matadors	
66	Roshawn Juhmi	(Canada)	DM	July 24, 2001 (age 25)	(Portugal) Vista Alegre	
	Damian Jamal-Olander	(Canada)	DM		(Canada) Vic West Soccer	DEV
	Max Piepgrass	(Canada)	CM	April 7, 2004 (age 22)	(Canada) Cavalry FC	U21
Forwards
9	Alejandro Díaz	(Mexico)	FW	January 27, 1996 (age 30)	(Canada) Vancouver FC	
10	Marco Bustos	(Canada)	RW / AM	April 22, 1996 (age 30)	(Sweden) IFK Värnamo	
27	Ronan Kratt	(Canada)	CF / LW / RW	September 2, 2003 (age 23)	(Germany) Werder Bremen II	
64	Yann Toualy	(Ivory Coast)	CF / LW	June 1, 2001 (age 25)	(United States) Vermont Green	
	Shaan Hundal	(Canada)	CF	July 14, 1999 (age 27)	(United States) Brooklyn FC	Loan

== Transfers ==
=== In ===
No.	Pos.	Player	From club	Fee/notes	Date	Source
99	FW	(Mexico) Alejandro Díaz	(Canada) Vancouver FC	Loan expired; permanent transfer option picked up	November 9, 2025	
	DF	(Netherlands) Diego Konincks	(United States) Chicago Fire II	Free	December 18, 2025	
	GK	(Canada) Eleias Himaras	(Canada) Valour FC	Free	January 8, 2026	
	DF	(Canada) Joshua Belluz	(United States) Colorado Rapids 2	Free	January 15, 2026	
	FW	(South Sudan) Bul Juach	(Australia) Heidelberg United	Free	February 12, 2026	
	MF	(Australia) Taras Gomulka	(Australia) Perth Glory	Free	February 17, 2026	
	DF	(Saint Vincent and the Grenadines) Tristan Marshall	(Greece) Makedonikos	Free	April 3, 2026	
	MF	(Canada) Damian Jamal-Olander	(Canada) Vic West Soccer	Development contract	April 21, 2026	
	MF	(Canada) Marley Edwards	(United States) CSUN Matadors	Free	May 1, 2026	
	MF	(Canada) Max Piepgrass	(Canada) Cavalry FC	Undisclosed fee & sell-on clause	July 30, 2026	

==== Loans in ====
No.	Pos.	Player	Loaned from	Fee/notes	Date	Source
	FW	(Canada) Shaan Hundal	(United States) Brooklyn FC	Loaned until end of season	July 30, 2025	

==== Draft picks ====
Pacific FC selected the following players in the 2026 CPL–U Sports Draft. Draft picks are not automatically signed to the team roster. Only those who are signed to a contract will be listed as transfers in.

Round	Selection	Pos.	Player	Nationality	University
1	4	DF	Archie Tugwell	Canada	Victoria
2	11	MF	Luke Norman	Canada	UBC

=== Out ===
No.	Pos.	Player	To club	Fee/notes	Date	Source
50	GK	(Canada) Max Anchor	(Canada) Vancouver Whitecaps	Loan expired	November 9, 2025	
2	DF	(Canada) Georges Mukumbilwa		Contract expired	December 31, 2025	
44	DF	(France) Aly Ndom	(Indonesia) Persijap Jepara	Contract expired	December 31, 2025	
16	DF	(Canada) Ahmad Mansour		Option declined	December 31, 2025	
21	MF	(Brazil) Daniel de Pauli		Option declined	December 31, 2025	
9	FW	(Canada) Dario Zanatta	(United States) Tormenta FC	Option declined	December 31, 2025	
17	FW	(Mexico) Emanuel Montejano		Option declined	December 31, 2025	
20	MF	(Canada) Sean Young	(United States) Loudoun United	Undisclosed fee	February 4, 2026	
19	FW	(South Sudan) Bul Juach		Contract terminated by mutual consent	July 2, 2026	

== Canadian Premier League ==
=== Regular season ===
April 5 Match Week 1	Pacific FC	1–2	Cavalry FC	Langford, British Columbia
15:00 PT (UTC-07:00)	Konincks 73'; Baldisimo (yellow card) 19'; Greco-Taylor (yellow card) 90+7'	Report	Warschewski 31' (pen); Paton 48'; Pearlman (yellow card) 43'; Camargo (yellow card) 45+5'; Ntignee (yellow card) 65'	Stadium: Starlight Stadium; Attendance: 3,362; Referee: Sebastian Noshinravani

April 11 Match Week 2	Pacific FC	2–3	FC Supra	Langford, British Columbia
15:00 PT (UTC-07:00)	Baldisimo (yellow card) 49'; Bustos 53'; Heard 69'; Belluz (yellow card) 90+1' (yellow-red card) 90+5'	Report	Auguste (yellow card) 30'; Kwemi 34'; Sissoko (yellow card) 45+2'; Rea 58'; Marcoux 90+7'	Stadium: Starlight Stadium; Referee: Alain Ruch

April 18 Match Week 3	HFX Wanderers	2–2	Pacific FC	Halifax, Nova Scotia
14:00 ADT (UTC-03:00)	Kachwele 56'; Johnston 76' (pen.); Ciccarelli (yellow card) 78'	Report	Díaz 20'; Greco-Taylor (yellow card) 73'; Heard (red card) 79'; Juach 90+8'	Stadium: Wanderers Grounds; Referee: Fabrizio Stasolla

April 26 Match Week 4	Pacific FC	0–1	Forge FC	Victoria, British Columbia
15:00 PT (UTC-07:00)	Gomulka (yellow card) 73'; Greco-Taylor (yellow card) 90+4'	Report	Wright 76'	Stadium: Royal Athletic Park; Referee: Mario Alayass

May 3 Match Week 5	Pacific FC	1–3	Vancouver FC	Victoria, British Columbia
16:00 PT (UTC-07:00)	Juhmi (yellow card) 65'; Bustos (yellow card) 71'; Toualy 78'	Report	Amissi 37'; Campbell 60', 82'; Polisi (yellow card) 68'	Stadium: Royal Athletic Park; Referee: Yusri Rudolf

May 17 Match Week 6	Pacific FC	0–1	Inter Toronto	Langford, British Columbia
14:00 PT (UTC-07:00)	Quintana (red card) 76'; Himaras (yellow card) 90+10'	Report	Ferrari (yellow card) 15'; Yeates (yellow card) 31'; Accettola (yellow card) 45+3'; Altobelli (yellow card) 66'; Gonzales 70'; Guzmán (yellow card) 82'; Bitar (yellow card) 90+4'	Stadium: Starlight Stadium

May 24 Match Week 7	Cavalry FC	3–0	Pacific FC	Foothills County, Alberta
15:00 MDT (UTC-06:00)	Pearlman (yellow card) 50'; Camargo 59'; Đidić 69'; Kobza (yellow card) 85'; Warschewski 90+4'	Report		Stadium: ATCO Field; Referee: Scott Bowman

May 30 Match Week 8	Pacific FC	2–2	Atlético Ottawa	Langford, British Columbia
15:00 PT (UTC-07:00)	Kratt 13'; Belluz (yellow card) 17' (yellow-red card) 89'; Toualy 50'; Juach (yellow card) 90+9'	Report	Cloutier 78'; García (yellow card) 69'; Tabla 90+11' (pen.)	Stadium: Starlight Stadium; Referee: Iwan-Nikita Jecanski

June 6 Match Week 9	FC Supra	1–1	Pacific FC	Quebec City, Quebec
19:00 EDT (UTC-04:00)	Rea 54'; Mlah (yellow card) 61'; Sissoko (yellow card) 78'; Abzi (yellow card) 84'	Report	Lajeunesse (yellow card) 20'; Greco-Taylor (yellow card) 39'; Díaz 43'; Toualy (yellow card) 45+1'	Stadium: Stade TELUS; Referee: Carly Shaw-MacLaren

June 14 Match Week 10	Vancouver FC	2–1	Pacific FC	Langley, British Columbia
16:00 PT (UTC-07:00)	Proctor 60'; Toomey 77'	Report	Bustos 34'; Schiavoni (yellow card) 84'; Lajeunesse (yellow card) 89'	Stadium: Willoughby Stadium; Referee: Roberto D'Alesio

June 26 Match Week 11	HFX Wanderers	5–2	Pacific FC	Halifax, Nova Scotia
18:30 ADT (UTC-03:00)	Lajeunesse 26' (o.g.); Arilla 32'; Olguin (yellow card) 58'; Callegari (yellow card) 63'; Chung 68' (o.g.); Johnston 74'; Ciccarelli 90+4' (pen.)	Report	Bustos 34'; Gomulka 64'	Stadium: Wanderers Grounds; Referee: Renzo Villanueva

July 5 Match Week 12	Pacific FC	1–2	HFX Wanderers	Langford, British Columbia
15:00 PT (UTC-07:00)	Heard (yellow card) 42'; Díaz 52' (pen.)	Report	Ciccarelli 21'; Callegari 60'	Stadium: Starlight Stadium; Referee: Alain Ruch

July 26 Match Week 14	Atlético Ottawa	3–2	Pacific FC	Ottawa, Ontario
14:00 EDT (UTC-04:00)	Timotéo (yellow card) 38'; Cloutier (yellow card) 45+3'; García 45+6'; Tabla 76'; Antinoro (yellow card) 90'; Castro (yellow card) 90+4'; Chateau 90+6'	Report	Díaz 53' (pen.); Heard (yellow card) 56'; Bustos 61'	Stadium: TD Place Stadium; Referee: Renzo Villanueva

July 31 Match Week 15	Pacific FC	1–2	FC Supra	Langford, British Columbia
19:00 PT (UTC-07:00)	Bustos 30', (red card) 80'; Heard (red card) 42'	Report	Kwemi 45'; Mlah 84'	Stadium: Starlight Stadium; Referee: Iwan-Nikita Jecanski

Aug 8 Match Week 16	Pacific FC	1–1	Inter Toronto	Langford, British Columbia
14:00 PT (UTC-07:00)	Gomulka (yellow card) 41'; Toualy 44'; Juhmi (yellow card) 66'; Hundal (yellow card) 79'	Report	Bassett (yellow card) 22'; Andrada (yellow card) 36'; Yeates (yellow card) 45+2'; Singh 63'; Gonzales (yellow card) 77'	Stadium: Starlight Stadium; Referee: Ben Hoskins

Aug 14 Match Week 17	Vancouver FC	1–1	Pacific FC	Langley, British Columbia
18:00 PT (UTC-07:00)	Campagna (yellow card) 40'; Bah (yellow card) 84'; Campbell 87'	Report	Kratt 36'; Juhmi (yellow card) 61'	Stadium: Willoughby Stadium; Referee: Michael Venne

Aug 22 Match Week 19	Forge FC	v	Pacific FC	Hamilton, Ontario
				Stadium: Hamilton Stadium

Aug 30 Match Week 20	Pacific FC	v	HFX Wanderers	Langford, British Columbia
				Stadium: Starlight Stadium

Sep 9 Match Week 21	Inter Toronto	v	Pacific FC	Toronto, Ontario
				Stadium: York Lions Stadium

Sep 5 Match Week 21	Atlético Ottawa	v	Pacific FC	Ottawa, Ontario
				Stadium: TD Place Stadium

Sep 13 Match Week 22	Pacific FC	v	Cavalry FC	Langford, British Columbia
				Stadium: Starlight Stadium

Sep 19 Match Week 23	Pacific FC	v	Vancouver FC	Langford, British Columbia
				Stadium: Starlight Stadium

Sep 27 Match Week 24	Inter Toronto	v	Pacific FC	Toronto, Ontario
				Stadium: York Lions Stadium

Oct 4 Match Week 25	FC Supra	v	Pacific FC	Laval, Quebec
				Stadium: Stade Boréale

Oct 7 Match Week 13 (Postponed)	Forge FC	v	Pacific FC	Hamilton, Ontario
				Stadium: Hamilton Stadium

Oct 11 Match Week 26	Pacific FC	v	Atlético Ottawa	Victoria, British Columbia
				Stadium: Royal Athletic Park

Oct 17 Match Week 27	Cavalry FC	v	Pacific FC	Foothills County, Alberta
				Stadium: ATCO Field

Oct 25 Match Week 28	Pacific FC	v	Forge FC	Victoria, British Columbia
				Stadium: Royal Athletic Park

== Canadian Championship ==
Pacific FC's Canadian Championship campaign ended in the preliminary round with a home loss against fellow Canadian Premier League team Cavalry FC.

May 9, 2026 Preliminary round	Pacific FC	1–3	Cavalry FC	Langford, BC
16:00 PT (UTC-07:00)	Marshall (yellow card) 18'; Chung (yellow card) 50'; Belluz 78'; Bustos (yellow card) 85'	Report	Klomp 78'; Musse (yellow card) 84'; Warschewski 88' (pen.); Baldisimo 90+4'	Stadium: Starlight Stadium; Attendance: 2,043; Referee: Alain Ruch
