= 2025 Pacific FC season =

Canadian soccer club's season of play

Pacific FC
2025 season
- Chairman: Dean Shillington
- Head coach: James Merriman
- Stadium: Starlight Stadium
- Canadian Premier League: 7th
- CPL playoffs: Did not qualify
- Canadian Championship: Preliminary round

The 2025 Pacific FC season was the seventh season in the history of Pacific FC. In addition to the Canadian Premier League, the club competed in the Canadian Championship.

== Squad ==
As of August 16, 2025

No.	Player	Nationality	Position(s)	Date of birth (age)	Previous club	Notes
Goalkeepers
50	Max Anchor	(Canada)	GK	July 21, 2004 (aged 21)	(Canada) Vancouver Whitecaps	U21, Loan
55	Sean Melvin	(Canada)	GK	July 9, 1994 (aged 31)	(Canada) Atlético Ottawa	
Defenders
2	Georges Mukumbilwa	(Canada)	RB	September 23, 1999 (aged 26)	(Canada) Vancouver Whitecaps FC	
5	Juan Quintana	(Colombia)	CB	November 10, 2003 (aged 22)	(Colombia) Orsomarso S.C.	INT
7	Kadin Chung	(Canada)	RB	September 5, 1998 (aged 27)	(Canada) Vancouver FC	
15	Christian Greco-Taylor	(Canada)	LB	February 20, 2005 (aged 20)	(Canada) Whitecaps FC Academy	U21
16	Ahmad Mansour	(Canada)	CB	November 3, 2000 (aged 25)	(Oman) Sur SC	
32	Mattias Hallam	(Canada)	CB	January 9, 2008 (aged 17)	(Canada) Van Isle Wave	DEV
36	Will Edgson	(Canada)	LB	February 29, 2008 (aged 17)	(Canada) Van Isle Wave	DEV
Midfielders
6	Lukas Browning Lagerfeldt	(Republic of Ireland)	CM	January 6, 1999 (aged 26)	(Sweden) Gefle IF	INT
8	Aidan Daniels	(Canada)	AM	September 6, 1998 (aged 27)	(Canada) HFX Wanderers	
10	Marco Bustos	(Canada)	RW / AM	April 22, 1996 (aged 29)	(Sweden) IFK Värnamo	
11	Josh Heard	(Wales)	AM	November 29, 1994 (aged 31)	(United States) Real Monarchs	
20	Sean Young	(Canada)	CM	April 20, 2001 (aged 24)	(Canada) Victoria Highlanders	
21	Daniel de Pauli	(Brazil)	DM	August 6, 1999 (aged 26)	(Bulgaria) FC Krumovgrad	INT
33	Matthew Baldisimo	(Philippines)	DM / CM	January 20, 1998 (aged 27)	(Canada) York United	
34	Sami Keshavarz	(Canada)	CM	August 18, 2006 (aged 19)	(Canada) Van Isle Wave	
37	Mattias Vales	(Canada)	AM	February 29, 2008 (aged 17)	(Canada) Van Isle Wave	DEV
44	Aly Ndom	(France)	DM / CB	May 30, 1996 (aged 29)	(Finland) IFK Mariehamn	INT
66	Roshawn Juhmi	(Canada)	DM	July 24, 2001 (aged 24)	(Portugal) Vista Alegre	
88	Matteo Schiavoni	(Canada)	MF	April 5, 2005 (aged 20)	(Canada) CF Montréal	U21
Forwards
9	Dario Zanatta	(Canada)	CF	May 24, 1997 (aged 28)	(Scotland) Hamilton Academical	
17	Emanuel Montejano	(Mexico)	ST	July 12, 2001 (aged 24)	(Mexico) Celaya	INT
27	Ronan Kratt	(Canada)	CF / LW / RW	September 2, 2003 (aged 22)	(Germany) Werder Bremen II	
39	Veniamin Chernyshev	(Ukraine)	ST	September 12, 2008 (aged 17)	(Canada) Van Isle Wave	DEV
64	Yann Toualy	(Ivory Coast)	CF / LW	June 1, 2001 (aged 24)	(United States) Vermont Green	
99	Alejandro Díaz	(Mexico)	FW	January 27, 1996 (aged 29)	(Canada) Vancouver FC	Loan

== Transfers ==
=== In ===
No.	Pos.	Player	From club	Fee/notes	Date	Source
	FW	(Canada) Ronan Kratt	(Germany) Werder Bremen II	Free	December 31, 2024	
	MF	(Canada) Aidan Daniels	(Canada) HFX Wanderers	Free	January 2, 2025	
	DF	(Canada) Kadin Chung	(Canada) Vancouver FC	Free	January 22, 2025	
	MF	(Canada) Marco Bustos	(Sweden) IFK Värnamo	Free	January 24, 2025	
	MF	(Brazil) Daniel de Pauli	(Bulgaria) FC Krumovgrad	Free	January 29, 2025	
	MF	(Republic of Ireland) Lukas Browning Lagerfeldt	(Sweden) Gefle IF	Free	January 31, 2025	
3	DF	(Canada) Eric Lajeunesse	(Canada) UBC Thunderbirds	U-Sports contract	February 5, 2025	
	MF	(Canada) Matteo Schiavoni	(Canada) CF Montréal	Free	February 7, 2025	
	DF	(Portugal) Pedro Machado	(Finland) IFK Mariehamn	Free	February 11, 2025	
	FW	(Mexico) Emanuel Montejano	(Mexico) Celaya	Free	March 5, 2025	
	MF	(Canada) Mattias Vales	(Canada) Van Isle Wave	Development contract	March 12, 2025	
	DF	(Canada) Fin Tugwell	(Canada) Victoria Vikes	Selected 12th in the 2025 CPL–U Sports Draft, U-Sports contract	March 19, 2025	
	DF	(Canada) Will Edgson	(Canada) Van Isle Wave	Development contract	March 21, 2025	
	DF	(Canada) Mattias Hallam	(Canada) Van Isle Wave	Development contract	March 21, 2025	
	FW	(Ivory Coast) Yann Toualy	(United States) Vermont Green	Free	April 2, 2025	
	FW	(Ukraine) Veniamin Chernyshev	(Canada) Van Isle Wave	Development contract	May 28, 2025	
33	MF	(Philippines) Matthew Baldisimo	(Canada) York United	Free	August 8, 2025	
16	DF	(Canada) Ahmad Mansour	(Oman) Sur SC	Free	August 8, 2025	
66	MF	(Canada) Roshawn Juhmi	(Portugal) Vista Alegre	Free	August 8, 2025	

==== Loans in ====
No.	Pos.	Player	From club	Fee/notes	Date	Source
	GK	(Canada) Max Anchor	(Canada) Vancouver Whitecaps	Season-long loan	March 14, 2025	
	FW	(Mexico) Alejandro Díaz	(Canada) Vancouver FC	Season-long loan with option for permanent transfer	July 23, 2025	

==== Draft picks ====
Pacific FC selected the following players in the 2025 CPL–U Sports Draft. Draft picks are not automatically signed to the team roster. Only those who are signed to a contract will be listed as transfers in.

Round	Selection	Pos.	Player	Nationality	University
1	4	FW	Niklas Hallam	Canada	Toronto
2	12	DF	Fin Tugwell	Canada	Victoria

=== Out ===
No.	Pos.	Player	To club	Fee/notes	Date	Source
18	FW	(New Zealand) Moses Dyer	(Canada) Vancouver FC	Loan expired	November 10, 2024	
4	DF	(Canada) Paul Amedume	(Canada) Edmonton BTB SC	Contract expired	December 31, 2024	
13	DF	(Canada) Kunle Dada-Luke	(Canada) Vancouver FC	Contract expired	December 31, 2024	
26	DF	(Canada) Thomas Meilleur-Giguère	(Canada) HFX Wanderers	Contract expired	December 31, 2024	
28	MF	(Canada) Cédric Toussaint	(Japan) Iwate Grulla	Contract expired	December 31, 2024	
21	MF	(Netherlands) Ayman Sellouf	(Bulgaria) Krumovgrad	Contract expired	December 31, 2024	
6	MF	(Guatemala) Marco Domínguez	(Guatemala) Comunicaciones F.C.	Contract terminated by mutual consent	December 31, 2024	
12	FW	(Trinidad and Tobago) Reon Moore		Contract terminated by mutual consent	December 31, 2024	
25	DF	(Argentina) Kevin Ceceri		Option declined	December 31, 2024	
8	MF	(Canada) Pierre Lamothe	(Vietnam) Hanoi FC	Option declined	December 31, 2024	
18	MF	(Canada) Zakaria Bahous		Option declined	December 31, 2024	
88	MF	(Romania) Andrei Tîrcoveanu	(Azerbaijan) Shamakhi FK	Option declined	December 31, 2024	
10	FW	(Canada) Adonijah Reid	(Canada) York United	Option declined	December 31, 2024	
17	FW	(Canada) Devin O'Hea	(Australia) Northcote City	Option declined	December 31, 2024	
7	MF	(Canada) Steffen Yeates	(Canada) York United	Undisclosed fee	January 20, 2025	
1	GK	(Canada) Emil Gazdov	(Canada) CF Montréal	Undisclosed fee & sell-on clause	February 28, 2025	
14	DF	(Portugal) Pedro Machado		Contract terminated by mutual consent	July 23, 2025	

== Competitions ==
=== Overview ===
Competition	Starting round	Final position	Record							
Competition	Starting round	Final position	Pld	W	D	L	GF	GA	GD	Win %
Canadian Premier League	Matchday 1	7th	28	5	8	15	30	59	−29	17.86
Canadian Championship	Preliminary round	Preliminary round	1	0	1	0	1	1	+0	0.00
Total			29	5	9	15	31	60	−29	17.24

Last updated: October 18, 2025
Source: Competitions

=== Canadian Premier League ===
==== Table ====
Pos	Team	Pld	W	D	L	GF	GA	GD	Pts	Qualification
1	Forge (S)	28	16	10	2	51	22	+29	58	First semifinal and 2026 CONCACAF Champions Cup
2	Atlético Ottawa (C)	28	15	11	2	54	28	+26	56	First semifinal
3	Cavalry	28	11	9	8	47	36	+11	42	Quarterfinal
4	HFX Wanderers	28	11	6	11	41	34	+7	39	Play-in round
5	York United	28	10	8	10	43	38	+5	38	Play-in round
6	Valour	28	7	5	16	35	62	−27	26	
7	Pacific	28	5	8	15	30	59	−29	23	
8	Vancouver	28	4	9	15	35	57	−22	21	2026 CONCACAF Champions Cup (Note: Vancouver FC qualified for the Champions Cup as the runners-up of the 2025 Canadian Championship, due to the winners, Vancouver Whitecaps FC, qualifying through Major League Soccer.)

Source: CanPL
Rules for classification: 1) Points; 2) Total number of wins; 3) Head-to-head; 4) Goal differential; 5) Goals for; 6) Away goals differential; 7) Away goals for; 8) Home goals differential; 9) Home goals for; 10) Fewest disciplinary points; 11) Most under-21 domestic player minutes; 12) Drawing of lots.
(C) Champion (qualified to Champions Cup Round one); (S) CPL Shield winner (qualified to Champions Cup Round one)

==== Results by match ====
Match	1	2	3	4	5	6	7	8	9	10	11	12	13	14	15	16	17	18	19	20	21	22	23	24	25	26	27	28
Ground	H	H	A	A	A	H	A	H	A	H	H	A	H	H	A	H	H	A	H	A	A	A	H	A	A	H	A	H
Result	W	L	L	D	L	W	L	L	D	L	L	L	D	W	L	L	W	W	D	L	D	L	D	L	L	D	D	L
Position (Note: Positions show the situation at the end of the corresponding game weeks, not the position at the conclusion of matches or game days.)	2	5	5	5	7	5	5	5	6	6	6	6	6	6	6	6	6	6	6	6	6	6	7	7	7	7	7	7

Source: #Matches
H = Home; N = Neutral; A = Away; W = Win; D = Draw; L = Loss; = Playoffs first semifinal; = Quarterfinal; = Play-in round

==== Matches ====
April 5 1	Pacific FC	2–0	Valour FC	Langford, British Columbia
5:00 PM PT	Zanatta 18'; Kratt 30'; Chung (yellow card) 51'; Heard (yellow card) 88'	Report	Alarcón (yellow card) 4'; Romeo (yellow card) 25'; Facchineri (yellow card) 34'	Stadium: Starlight Stadium; Attendance: 3,255

April 12 2	Pacific FC	0–2	Forge FC	Langford, British Columbia
2:00 PM PT	Zanatta (yellow card) 26'; de Pauli (yellow card) 27'; Quintana (yellow card) 75'	Report	Kane 44'; Achinioti-Jönsson 60'; Jevremović (yellow card) 75'; Rama (yellow card) 87'	Stadium: Starlight Stadium; Attendance: 3,420

April 19 3	HFX Wanderers FC	3–1	Pacific FC	Halifax, Nova Scotia
12:30 PM PT	Timoteo 19'; Probo (yellow card) 45+5'; Pearlman (yellow card) 45+5'; Gheisar (yellow card) 45+6'; Telfer 65'; Yesli (yellow card) 79'; Baï (yellow card) 84', (goal) 90+5'	Report	Chung (yellow card) 27'; Quintana (yellow card) 43'; Machado (yellow card) 45+2'; Zanatta 71'	Stadium: Wanderers Grounds; Attendance: 6,817

April 26 4	Vancouver FC	1–1	Pacific FC	Langley Township, British Columbia
5:00 PM PT	Mezquida 17' (yellow card) 69'; Dada-Luke (red card) 51'; Fry (yellow card) 56'; Gee (yellow card) 81'; Bah (yellow card) 90+2'	Report	Machado (yellow card) 43'; Heard (yellow card) 45'; Ndom 70'; Browning Lagerfeldt (yellow card) 80'	Stadium: Willoughby Community Park; Attendance: 1,283

May 3 5	Atlético Ottawa	3–1	Pacific FC	Ottawa, Ontario
10:00 AM PT	Didić (yellow card) 28'; dos Santos 55'; Castro (yellow card) 63'; Antinoro 64'; Rodríguez 69'	Report	Kratt 37'; Quintana (yellow card) 67'	Stadium: TD Place Stadium; Attendance: 3,628

May 10 6	Pacific FC	2–1	York United	Langford, British Columbia
5:00 PM PT	Zanatta 43' (pen.); Daniels (yellow card) 54'; Heard (yellow card) 56'; Montejano (yellow card) 67', (goal) 90+1'; Yeates (yellow card) 90+1'; Anchor (yellow card) 90+2'	Report	Ferrazzo (yellow card) 9'; Bitar 24'; Sturing (yellow card) 26'; León (yellow card) 90+9'	Stadium: Starlight Stadium; Attendance: 2,883

May 17 7	Cavalry FC	4–0	Pacific FC	Foothills County, Alberta
2:00 PM PT	Gherasimencov 6'; Warschewski 60' (pen.); Musse 68' (pen.); Wähling 90+4'	Report	Ndom (yellow card) 37'; Greco-Taylor (yellow card) 70' (yellow-red card) 87'; Bustos (yellow card) 82'	Stadium: ATCO Field; Attendance: 3,669

May 24 8	Pacific FC	0–1	Forge FC	Langford, British Columbia
2:00 PM PT	Young (yellow card) 84'	Report	Ampomah (yellow card) 29'; Massunda 88'	Stadium: Starlight Stadium; Attendance: 2,281

June 1 9	Valour FC	0–0	Pacific FC	Winnipeg, Manitoba
1:00 PM PT	Figueiredo (yellow card) 10'	Report	Heard (yellow card) 22'; Layne (yellow card) 52'; Ohin (yellow card) 73'; Egwu (yellow card) 85'	Stadium: Princess Auto Stadium; Attendance: 5,728

June 7 10	Pacific FC	0–1	Atlético Ottawa	Langford, British Columbia
3:00 PM PT	Young (yellow card) 44'; Browning-Lagerfeldt (yellow card) 67'; Schiavoni (yellow card) 88'	Report	Walker (yellow card) 38'; Tabla 43' (pen.); Castro (yellow card) 46'; Salter (yellow card) 51'; Rodríguez (yellow card) 64'	Stadium: Starlight Stadium; Attendance: 2,506

June 14 11	Pacific FC	1–3	York United	Langford, British Columbia
3:00 PM PT	Young (yellow card) 10'; Ndom 19', (yellow card) 58'	Report	Kibato (yellow card) 41'; Accettola 52'; Ferrazzo 59'; Botello 69'	Stadium: Starlight Stadium; Attendance: 2,604

June 21 12	Cavalry FC	1–0	Pacific FC	Foothills County, Alberta
3:00 PM PT	Musse 12'; Shome (yellow card) 31'; Gherasimencov (yellow card) 53'	Report	Schiavoni (yellow card) 47'; Lajeunesse (yellow card) 71'	Stadium: ATCO Field; Attendance: 3,450

June 27 13	Pacific FC	4–4	Vancouver FC	Langford, British Columbia
7:00 PM PT	Ndom 17', 54', (yellow card) 90+7'; Bustos (yellow card) 40'; Toualy 76'; Irving 90+3' (o.g.)	Report	Godbout 55'; Norman Jr. 64'; Ndiaye 89'; Mezquida 90+1', (yellow card) 90+2'	Stadium: Starlight Stadium; Attendance: 2,821

July 12 14	Pacific FC	3–2	HFX Wanderers FC	Langford, British Columbia
3:00 PM PT	Toualy 10', 41', 55' (pen.); Heard (yellow card) 57'; Melvin (yellow card) 90+3'	Report	Coimbra 29'; Baï 34'; Rea (yellow card) 40'; Johnston (yellow card) 59'	Stadium: Starlight Stadium; Attendance: 2,710

July 18 15	Forge FC	2–0	Pacific FC	Hamilton, Ontario
4:00 PM PT	Jevremović (yellow card) 42'; Nimick 77' (pen.); Ampomah 80'	Report	Ndom (yellow card) 42'; Bustos (yellow card) 73'	Stadium: Hamilton Stadium; Attendance: 5,844

July 26 16	Pacific FC	0–2	Atlético Ottawa	Langford, British Columbia
5:00 PM PT		Report	Tabla (yellow card) 32'; Salter 61'; Rodríguez 71'	Stadium: Starlight Stadium; Attendance: 2,732

August 4 17	Pacific FC	1–0	Cavalry FC	Langford, British Columbia
3:00 PM PT	Heard (yellow card) 7'; Chung (yellow card) 45+3', (goal) 90+1'; Browning Lagerfeldt (yellow card) 90+4'	Report	Gutiérrez (yellow card) 50'	Stadium: Starlight Stadium; Attendance: 2,918

August 10 18	Vancouver FC	2–3	Pacific FC	Langley Township, British Columbia
3:00 PM PT	Bah 33'; Ndiaye 49'; Norman Jr. (yellow card) 56'; Enyou (yellow card) 90+5'	Report	Díaz 45+4' (pen.), 60'; Heard 46'; Browning Lagerfeldt (yellow card) 69'	Stadium: Willoughby Community Park; Attendance: 1,408

August 16 19	Pacific FC	2–2	HFX Wanderers FC	Langford, British Columbia
3:00 PM PT	Chung 31'; Daniels 45+2'; Zanatta (yellow card) 60'; Young (yellow card) 70'	Report	Mansour 17' (o.g.); Coimbra 29'; Callegari (yellow card) 45'	Stadium: Starlight Stadium; Attendance: 2,879

August 24 20	York United	5–1	Pacific FC	Toronto, Ontario
1:00 PM PT	Hundall 10', 72', 80', 82'; López 16'; Reid (yellow card) 52'	Report	Díaz 45'; Zanatta (yellow card) 48'	Stadium: York Lions Stadium; Attendance: 1,583

August 31 21	Valour FC	1–1	Pacific FC	Winnipeg, Manitoba
12:00 PM PT	Konincks 14'; Froese (yellow card) 40'; Alarcón (yellow card) 54'	Report	Díaz 21' (pen.); Zanatta (yellow card) 53'	Stadium: Princess Auto Stadium; Attendance: 2,053

September 6 22	Atlético Ottawa	2–0	Pacific FC	TD Place Stadium
4:00 PM PT	Tabla 75'; Coulanges 80'; (yellow card) 90'	Report	Chung (yellow card) 42'; Schiavoni (yellow card) 72'; Toualy (yellow card) 82'; Ndom (yellow card) 87'	Stadium: Ottawa, Ontario; Attendance: 4,361

September 13 23	Pacific FC	1–1	Vancouver FC	Victoria, British Columbia
4:00 PM PT	Mukumbilwa (yellow card) 37'; Ndom (yellow card) 45', (goal) 90+3'	Report	Pathé (yellow card) 33'; Mbongue 44' (pen.); Dada-Luke (yellow card) 90+4'	Stadium: Royal Athletic Park; Attendance: 4,300

September 20 24	HFX Wanderers FC	3–0	Pacific FC	Halifax, Nova Scotia
12:00 PM PT	Johnston 50'; Callegari 54' (pen.); Juhmi 68' (o.g.); Rea (yellow card) 85'	Report	Young (yellow card) 26'; Pearlman (yellow card) 31'; Juhmi (yellow card) 36'; Heard (yellow card) 71'; Greco-Taylor (yellow card) 85'	Stadium: Wanderers Grounds; Attendance: 6,978

September 27 25	Forge FC	4–0	Pacific FC	Hamilton, Ontario
1:00 PM PT	Massunda 2'; Jensen 21'; Cissé 87'; Hojabrpour (yellow card) 88'; Wright 90+4'	Report	Juhmi (yellow card) 42'; Greco-Taylor (yellow card) 45+1'	Stadium: Hamilton Stadium; Attendance: 6,017

October 5 26	Pacific FC	3–3	Cavalry FC	Langford, British Columbia
3:00 PM PT	Ndom (yellow card) 16'; Young 42'; Greco-Taylor (yellow card) 44'; Chung (yellow card) 59'; Keshavarz 65'; Díaz 69'	Report	Ntignee 21', 51'; Baldisimo (yellow card) 33' (yellow-red card) 62'; Klomp 90+3'	Stadium: Starlight Stadium; Attendance: 3,774

October 9 27	York United	2–2	Pacific FC	Toronto, Ontario
4:30 PM PT	Ferrari (yellow card) 47'; López (yellow card) 53'; Jimoh (yellow card) 72'; Hundal 73'; Accettola 90+3'	Report	Bustos 20'; Juhmi (yellow card) 29'; Díaz 33' (pen.); Ndom (yellow card) 84'; Montejano (yellow card) 90+3'	Stadium: York Lions Stadium; Attendance: 1,431

October 18 28	Pacific FC	1–4	Valour FC	Langford, British Columbia
1:00 PM PT	Young (yellow card) 44'; Bustos 68', (yellow card) 79'; Heard (yellow card) 80' (yellow-red card) 82'	Report	Morgan 19', 64'; Konincks 22'; Voytsekhovskyy 39'; Ressurreição (yellow card) 76'	Stadium: Starlight Stadium

=== Canadian Championship ===
May 6 Preliminary round	Pacific FC	v (2–4 p)	Vancouver FC	Langford, British Columbia
7:00 PM PT	Lajeunesse (yellow card) 33'; Ndom 49'; Vales (yellow card) 66'; Anchor (yellow card) 73'	Report	Díaz 34' (pen.), (yellow card) 53'; Norman Jr. (yellow card) 62'; Dada-Luke (yellow card) 84'	Stadium: Starlight Stadium; Attendance: 2,017; Referee: Michael Venne
	Penalties
	Bustos (penalty missed); Ndom (penalty scored); Keshavarz (penalty scored); Montejano (penalty missed)		(penalty scored) Díaz; (penalty scored) Mezquida; (penalty missed) Fry; (penalty scored) O'Connor; (penalty scored) Norman Jr.
