= Veniamin Chernyshev =

Ukrainian footballer (born 2008)

Personal information
- Date of birth: 9 December 2008 (age 17)
- Place of birth: Kramatorsk, Ukraine
- Height: 1.83 m (6 ft 0 in)
- Position: Forward

Team information
- Current team: Pacific FC
- Number: 39

Youth career
- Okanagan United FC
- Vancouver Island Wave

Senior career*
Years	Team	Apps	(Gls)
2025–	Pacific FC	2	(0)
- * Club domestic league appearances and goals as of September 30, 2025

Veniamin Chernyshev (Ukrainian: Веніамін Чернишев; born 9 December 2008) is a Ukrainian professional footballer who plays for Pacific FC in the Canadian Premier League.

== Early and personal life ==
Chernyshev was born in Kramatorsk, Ukraine and grew up in Kiev, before moving to Kelowna, British Columbia in Canada in 2022, due to the Russia-Ukraine War. He began playing youth soccer in Canada with Okanagan United FC, before joining the Vancouver Island Wave program, after being scouted by Jamar Dixon, the Director of Football for Pacific FC. In 2025, he was named to the British Columbia roster for the 2025 Canada Summer Games.

He is currently in the process of becoming a permanent resident of Canada.

== Club career ==
In May 2025, Chernyshev signed a developmental contract with Pacific FC of the Canadian Premier League. He received a special dispensation to sign the developmental contract, which is reserved for domestic youth players allowing them to maintain their youth eligibility, as he was in the process of applying for Canadian permanent residency after leaving Ukraine due to the war. On 26 July 2025, he made his professional debut for the club.

== Career statistics ==
As of 30 September 2024

Club	Season	League			Playoffs		Domestic Cup		Continental		Total	
Club	Season	Division	Apps	Goals	Apps	Goals	Apps	Goals	Apps	Goals	Apps	Goals
Pacific FC	2025	Canadian Premier League	2	0	–		0	0	–		2	0
Career total			2	0	0	0	0	0	0	0	2	0
