= Dylan De Melo (soccer) =

Canadian soccer player (born 2009 )

Dylan de Melo
Personal information
- Full name: Dylan Nelson de Melo
- Date of birth: August 5, 2009 (age 17)
- Place of birth: London, Ontario, Canada
- Height: 1.67 m (5 ft 5 1/2 in)
- Position: Midfielder

Team information
- Current team: Pacific FC

Youth career
- Alliance FC
- London TFC

Senior career*
Years	Team	Apps	(Gls)
2025	FC London	3	(0)
2026–	Pacific FC	3	(0)
- * Club domestic league appearances and goals as of November 4, 2026

Dylan Nelson de Melo (born August 5, 2009) is a Canadian soccer player who plays for Canadian Premier League club Pacific FC.

== Early life ==
De Melo played youth soccer in his hometown of London, Ontario with Alliance FC, winning the 2022 and 2023 U13 and U14 Ontario Cup titles. He later joined London TFC.

== Club career ==
In 2025, de Melo debuted at the senior level with FC London (the senior side of his London TFC youth club team) in League1 Ontario.

In August 2026, he signed a developmental contract with Canadian Premier League club Pacific FC.

== Personal life ==
De Melo was born in Canada and is of Italian descent, holding dual Canadian and Italian citizenship.

== Career statistics ==
As of November 4, 2026

Appearances and goals by club, season and competition
Club	Season	League			Playoffs		National cup		League cup		Total	
Club	Season	Division	Apps	Goals	Apps	Goals	Apps	Goals	Apps	Goals	Apps	Goals
FC London	2025	League1 Ontario Premier	3	0	—		—		1	0	4	0
Pacific FC	2026	Canadian Premier League	3	0	—		0	0	—		3	0
Career total			6	0	0	0	0	0	1	0	7	0
