= Soccer at the 2025 Canada Summer Games =

European football tournament

Tournament details
- Dates: August 10–24, 2025
- Teams: 24
- Venues: 3 (in 1 host city)

Tournament statistics
- Matches played: 48
- Goals scored: 176 (3.67 per match)

Soccer at the 2025 Canada Summer Games was located at the CBS Soccer Complex located in Conception Bay South as well as Fortis Canada Games Complex and King George V Park in St. John's. The men's event ran August 10–15, 2025. The women's event was during August 19–24, 2025.

== Medallists ==
Soccer	Gold	Silver	Bronze
Men	Quebec	Alberta	British Columbia
Women	Ontario	Quebec	Nova Scotia

== Men ==
Men's Soccer at the 2025 Canada Summer Games
Tournament details
- Dates: August 10–15, 2025
- Teams: 12
- Venues: 3 (in 1 host city)

Final positions
- Champions: Quebec
- Runners-up: Alberta
- Third place: British Columbia

Tournament statistics
- Matches played: 24
- Goals scored: 85 (3.54 per match)
- Top scorer: (Saskatchewan) Zachary Kim (4 goals)
- Best player: (Quebec) Michael Adom Ampofo

=== Group Stage ===
==== Group A ====
Pos	Team	Pld	W	D	L	GF	GA	GD	Pts	Qualification
1	Quebec	2	2	0	0	4	1	+3	6	Advance to semifinals
2	Newfoundland and Labrador (H)	2	0	1	1	2	4	−2	1 (Note: Placement decided by penalty shootout on August 13: Newfoundland and Labrador 4–1 Manitoba.)	
3	Manitoba	2	0	1	1	1	2	−1	1	

Source: Canada Summer Games
Rules for classification: If two teams tied: 1) head-to-head; 2) penalty shootout.
If three teams tied: 1) head-to-head goal difference; 2) head-to-head goals scored; 3) overall goal difference; 4) overall goals scored; 5) drawing of lots.
(H) Hosts
Notes:
August 10, 2025
16:30

Manitoba	0–1	Quebec
	Report	Olumide 66' (o.g.)

King George V Park
Referee: Mariusz Buczkowski
August 11, 2025
19:30

Manitoba	1–1	Newfoundland and Labrador
Long 35'	Report	Bridon-Bridle 6'

King George V Park
Referee: Miguel Carrillo
August 12, 2025
19:30

Newfoundland and Labrador	1–3	Quebec
Foran 72' (pen.)	Report	Messoudi 25', 40'; Guay 33'

King George V Park
Referee: Cody Baldauf

==== Group B ====
Pos	Team	Pld	W	D	L	GF	GA	GD	Pts	Qualification
1	British Columbia	2	2	0	0	5	1	+4	6	Advance to semifinals
2	Ontario	2	1	0	1	3	2	+1	3	
3	Saskatchewan	2	0	0	2	0	5	−5	0	

Source: Canada Summer Games
Rules for classification: If two teams tied: 1) head-to-head; 2) penalty shootout.
If three teams tied: 1) head-to-head goal difference; 2) head-to-head goals scored; 3) overall goal difference; 4) overall goals scored; 5) drawing of lots.
August 10, 2025
16:30

Ontario	2–0	Saskatchewan
Frasca 51'; McKee 55'	Report

CBS Soccer Field
Referee: Redouane Benazza
August 11, 2025
19:30

British Columbia	3–0	Saskatchewan
Vales 3'; Troisi 39'; Nielsen 64'	Report

Fortis Canada Games Complex
Referee: Cody Baldauf
August 12, 2025
16:30

British Columbia	2–1	Ontario
Marsden 80+7' (pen.); Vales 80+9'	Report	Elmarakby 10'

King George V Park
Referee: Denzil Sharma

==== Group C ====
Pos	Team	Pld	W	D	L	GF	GA	GD	Pts	Qualification
1	Alberta	2	2	0	0	11	0	+11	6	Advance to semifinals
2	Prince Edward Island	2	1	0	1	4	4	0	3	
3	Yukon	2	0	0	2	1	12	−11	0	

Source: Canada Summer Games
Rules for classification: If two teams tied: 1) head-to-head; 2) penalty shootout.
If three teams tied: 1) head-to-head goal difference; 2) head-to-head goals scored; 3) overall goal difference; 4) overall goals scored; 5) drawing of lots.
August 10, 2025
19:30

Alberta	3–0	Prince Edward Island
Darpoh 7', 30'; Gebeyehu 40'	Report

King George V Park
Referee: Denzil Sharma
August 11, 2025
16:30

Prince Edward Island	4–1	Yukon
Guindon 4'; Dias 5', 49'; Munro 26'	Report	Chisholm 31'

Fortis Canada Games Complex
Referee: Liam Haley
August 12, 2025
19:30

Alberta	8–0	Yukon
Gebeyehu 16'; Gidney 24' (pen.), 39'; Ogbolu Jr. 29'; Zimola 50'; Abebe 73', 75', 76'	Report

Fortis Canada Games Complex
Referee: Redouane Benazza

==== Group D ====
Pos	Team	Pld	W	D	L	GF	GA	GD	Pts	Qualification
1	Nova Scotia	2	2	0	0	5	0	+5	6	Advance to semifinals
2	New Brunswick	2	1	0	1	5	1	+4	3	
3	Northwest Territories	2	0	0	2	0	9	−9	0	

Source: Canada Summer Games
Rules for classification: If two teams tied: 1) head-to-head; 2) penalty shootout.
If three teams tied: 1) head-to-head goal difference; 2) head-to-head goals scored; 3) overall goal difference; 4) overall goals scored; 5) drawing of lots.
August 10, 2025
19:30

New Brunswick	0–1	Nova Scotia
	Report	Hawes 44'

CBS Soccer Field
Referee: Thomas Noël
August 11, 2025
16:30

Nova Scotia	4–0	Northwest Territories
Marsh 19' (pen.), 79'; Gouthro 53'; Hawes 60'	Report

King George V Park
Referee: Xerxes Ng
August 12, 2025
16:30

New Brunswick	5–0	Northwest Territories
Alhajjy 9' (o.g.); Kaziya 10'; Oluseun 40', 77'; Boisvert 79'	Report

Fortis Canada Games Complex
Referee: Liam Haley

=== Qualification stage ===
==== 9th to 12th ====
9th to 12th
August 14
Manitoba	4
Northwest Territories	0
August 14
Saskatchewan	3
Yukon	0

9th / 10th
August 15
Manitoba	1
Saskatchewan	5
11th / 12th
August 15
Northwest Territories	1
Yukon	2

August 14, 2025
13:30

Manitoba	4–0	Northwest Territories
Benjamin 27'; Kir'Yanaki-Natashyn 36'; Galaz 49'; Long 67'	Report

King George V Park
Referee: Xerxes Ng
August 14, 2025
13:30

Saskatchewan	3–0	Yukon
Kim 23'; Artunduaga 63'; Olaleye 71'	Report

Fortis Canada Games Complex
Referee: Thomas Noël

August 15, 2025
09:30

Northwest Territories	1–2	Yukon
Alhajjy 38'	Report	Chisholm 65'; Krocker 69'

King George V Park
Referee: Liam Haley
August 15, 2025
09:30

Manitoba	1–5	Saskatchewan
Olumide 44'	Report	Kim 5', 21', 26'; Striker 30'; Laclaire 69'

Fortis Canada Games Complex
Referee: Xerxes Ng

==== 5th to 8th ====
5th to 8th
August 14
New Brunswick	3
Newfoundland and Labrador	0
August 14
Ontario	4
Prince Edward Island	1

5th / 6th
August 15
New Brunswick	3
Ontario	5
7th / 8th
August 15
Newfoundland and Labrador	2
Prince Edward Island	3

August 14, 2025
16:30

New Brunswick	3–0	Newfoundland and Labrador
Powell 6' (o.g.); Kaziya 17', 72'	Report

King George V Park
Referee: Mariusz Buczkowski
August 14, 2025
16:30

Ontario	4–1	Prince Edward Island
Singh 39'; Elmarakby 66'; Abraham 76'; Vecchiarelli 80+2'	Report	Munro 56'

Fortis Canada Games Complex
Referee: Redouane Benazza

August 15, 2025
13:30

Newfoundland and Labrador	2–3	Prince Edward Island
Foran 11'; Hynes 61'	Report	Guindon 17'; Dias 64'; Hebert 68'

King George V Park
Referee: Denzil Sharma
August 15, 2025
13:30

New Brunswick	3–5	Ontario
Kaziya 16'; Alhaj-Ali 44'; Boisvert 73'	Report	Abraham 10'; Singh 23'; Elmarakby 52' (pen.), 53'; McKee 80+1'

Fortis Canada Games Complex
Referee: Miguel Carrillo

==== Medal round ====
Semifinals
August 14
Nova Scotia	0
Quebec	1
August 14
Alberta (p)	1 (4)
British Columbia	1 (3)

Final
August 15
Quebec (p)	0 (4)
Alberta	0 (3)
Third place
August 15
British Columbia	4
Nova Scotia	0

August 14, 2025
19:30

Nova Scotia	0–1	Quebec
	Report	Douglas 17'

King George V Park
Referee: Miguel Carrillo
August 14, 2025
19:30

Alberta	1–1	British Columbia
Marchant 48'	Report	Jamal-Olander 80'
Penalties
Gebeyehu (penalty scored); Rojas (penalty scored); Gidney (penalty scored); Kohlman (penalty missed); Zimola (penalty scored)	4–3	(penalty scored) Marsden; (penalty scored) Vales; (penalty scored) Nielsen; (penalty missed) Troisi; (penalty missed) Froh

Fortis Canada Games Complex
Referee: Cody Baldauf

August 15, 2025
16:30

British Columbia	4–0	Nova Scotia
Blount 4', 39'; Muzio 32'; Chernyshev 63'	Report

King George V Park
Referee: Thomas Noël
August 15, 2025
19:30

Quebec	0–0 (a.e.t.)	Alberta
	Report
Penalties
Allou (penalty missed); Awonongbadje (penalty scored); Adom Ampofo (penalty scored); N'Sa (penalty scored); Makarova (penalty scored)	4–3	(penalty missed) Gebeyehu; (penalty scored) Rojas; (penalty missed) Gidney; (penalty scored) Marchant; (penalty scored) Munoz

King George V Park
Referee: Cody Baldauf

=== Final standings ===
Place	Team
1st place, gold medalist(s)	Quebec
2nd place, silver medalist(s)	Alberta
3rd place, bronze medalist(s)	British Columbia
4	Nova Scotia
5	Ontario
6	New Brunswick
7	Prince Edward Island
8	Newfoundland and Labrador
9	Saskatchewan
10	Manitoba
11	Yukon
12	Northwest Territories

== Women ==
Women's Soccer at the 2025 Canada Summer Games
Tournament details
- Dates: August 19–24, 2025
- Teams: 12
- Venues: 3 (in 1 host city)

Final positions
- Champions: Ontario
- Runners-up: Quebec
- Third place: Nova Scotia

Tournament statistics
- Matches played: 24
- Goals scored: 91 (3.79 per match)
- Top scorer(s): British Columbia Daniella Sprauer; Saskatchewan Calla Zimmer (4 goals each)

=== Group Stage ===
==== Group A ====
Pos	Team	Pld	W	D	L	GF	GA	GD	Pts	Qualification
1	Ontario	2	2	0	0	11	0	+11	6	Advance to semifinals
2	Prince Edward Island	2	1	0	1	1	4	−3	3	
3	Manitoba	2	0	0	2	0	8	−8	0	

Source: Canada Summer Games
Rules for classification: If two teams tied: 1) head-to-head; 2) penalty shootout.
If three teams tied: 1) head-to-head goal difference; 2) head-to-head goals scored; 3) overall goal difference; 4) overall goals scored; 5) drawing of lots.
August 19, 2025
15:30

Ontario	4–0	Prince Edward Island
Cortes-Browne 3'; Menard 64'; Rueffer 71'; Taylor 75'	Report

King George V Park
Referee: Emma Blanchet
August 20, 2025
19:30

Manitoba	0–1	Prince Edward Island
	Report	Langley 43'

CBS Soccer Field
Referee: Laura McNicholas
August 21, 2025
19:30

Manitoba	0–7	Ontario
	Report	Morra 34'; Nembhard 54'; Taylor 61'; Patterson 62'; Omeze 66'; Rueffer 70', 80'

Fortis Canada Games Complex
Referee: Laura McNicholas

==== Group B ====
Pos	Team	Pld	W	D	L	GF	GA	GD	Pts	Qualification
1	Quebec	2	2	0	0	11	0	+11	6	Advance to semifinals
2	British Columbia	2	1	0	1	8	1	+7	3	
3	Northwest Territories	2	0	0	2	0	18	−18	0	

Source: Canada Summer Games
Rules for classification: If two teams tied: 1) head-to-head; 2) penalty shootout.
If three teams tied: 1) head-to-head goal difference; 2) head-to-head goals scored; 3) overall goal difference; 4) overall goals scored; 5) drawing of lots.
August 19, 2025
15:30

Northwest Territories	0–10	Quebec
	Report	Pokou 2', 22'; Bélanger 21', 24'; Kamdem 34', 36'; Harvey 37'; Lanni 75'; Dzemua 77' (o.g.); Berthe 79'

Fortis Canada Games Complex
Referee: Lillian Ryu
August 20, 2025
19:30

British Columbia	8–0	Northwest Territories
Sprauer 4', 11', 12', 28'; Hill 25'; Burdeyny 38'; Cronkhite 52'; Rosse 69'	Report

King George V Park
Referee: Fatima Morabite
August 21, 2025
19:30

British Columbia	0–1	Quebec
	Report	Kamdem 10'

King George V Park
Referee: Nicole Rapin

==== Group C ====
Pos	Team	Pld	W	D	L	GF	GA	GD	Pts	Qualification
1	Nova Scotia	2	1	1	0	9	2	+7	4 (Note: Placement decided by penalty shootout immediately after August 21 match: New Brunswick 4–5 Nova Scotia.)	Advance to semifinals
2	New Brunswick	2	1	1	0	10	2	+8	4	
3	Yukon	2	0	0	2	0	15	−15	0	

Source: Canada Summer Games
Rules for classification: If two teams tied: 1) head-to-head; 2) penalty shootout.
If three teams tied: 1) head-to-head goal difference; 2) head-to-head goals scored; 3) overall goal difference; 4) overall goals scored; 5) drawing of lots.
Notes:
August 19, 2025
19:30

Nova Scotia	7–0	Yukon
Macdonald 1'; Mert 18'; Akao 21', 32'; Audain 64'; Hall 73'; McCormick 76'	Report

King George V Park
Referee: Nicole Rapin
August 20, 2025
15:30

New Brunswick	8–0	Yukon
Vandendort 9'; Girouard 11', 42' (pen.); St-Pierre 52'; Rioux 56', 73', 77'; Green 60'	Report

CBS Soccer Field
Referee: Victoria Warner
August 21, 2025
15:30

New Brunswick	2–2	Nova Scotia
Plourde 7'; Green 77'	Report	Kabba 4' (o.g.); Akao 31'
Penalties
Leroux (penalty scored); Green (penalty missed); Bourgeois (penalty scored); Leblanc (penalty scored); Girouard (penalty scored)	4–5	(penalty scored) Hall; (penalty scored) Akao; (penalty scored) J. Buchanan; (penalty scored) Young; (penalty scored) Workman

Fortis Canada Games Complex
Referee: Angelina Baldino

==== Group D ====
Pos	Team	Pld	W	D	L	GF	GA	GD	Pts	Qualification
1	Alberta	2	1	1	0	6	2	+4	4 (Note: Placement decided by penalty shootout immediately after August 21 match: Alberta 4–2 Newfoundland and Labrador.)	Advance to semifinals
2	Newfoundland and Labrador (H)	2	1	1	0	3	2	+1	4	
3	Saskatchewan	2	0	0	2	2	7	−5	0	

Source: Canada Summer Games
Rules for classification: If two teams tied: 1) head-to-head; 2) penalty shootout.
If three teams tied: 1) head-to-head goal difference; 2) head-to-head goals scored; 3) overall goal difference; 4) overall goals scored; 5) drawing of lots.
(H) Hosts
Notes:
August 19, 2025
19:30

Alberta	5–1	Saskatchewan
Pegg 4' (o.g.); Dancocks 17'; Jones 49'; Reid-Garvey 73'; Walia 80+1'	Report	Turnbull 50'

Fortis Canada Games Complex
Referee: Angelina Baldino
August 20, 2025
15:30

Newfoundland and Labrador	2–1	Saskatchewan
Janes 17' (pen.), 77'	Report	Zimmer 4'

King George V Park
Referee: Shaelyn Holdaway
August 21, 2025
15:30

Alberta	1–1	Newfoundland and Labrador
Dancocks 40+2'	Report	Janes 52'
Penalties
Colbert (penalty scored); Cha-Yang (penalty scored); Monck (penalty scored); Kunn (penalty scored)	4–2	(penalty missed) Janes; (penalty scored) Power; (penalty scored) Neville; (penalty missed) Winters

King George V Park
Referee: Lillian Ryu

=== Qualification stage ===
==== 9th to 12th ====
9th to 12th
August 23
Manitoba	2 (4)
Saskatchewan (p)	2 (5)
August 23
Northwest Territories	0 (1)
Yukon (p)	0 (3)

9th / 10th
August 24
Saskatchewan	6
Yukon	0
11th / 12th
August 24
Manitoba	4
Northwest Territories	0

August 23, 2025
10:30

Manitoba	2–2	Saskatchewan
Desautels 38'; Molina 77' (pen.)	Report	Zimmer 50'; Holt-Mellor 57'
Penalties
Molina (penalty scored); Simpson (penalty missed); Waller (penalty scored); E. Young (penalty scored); Paulic (penalty scored); Lavoie (penalty missed)	4–5	(penalty scored) Michell; (penalty scored) Zimmer; (penalty missed) Schmalenberg; (penalty scored) Louma; (penalty scored) Pegg; (penalty scored) Holt-Mellor

CBS Soccer Field
Referee: Emma Blanchet
August 23, 2025
10:30

Northwest Territories	0–0	Yukon
	Report
Penalties
Darku (penalty missed); Duru (penalty scored); Neglak-Voss (penalty missed); Dzemua (penalty missed)	1–3	(penalty missed) Sack; (penalty scored) Roberts; (penalty scored) Lawrence; (penalty scored) Minifie

Fortis Canada Games Complex
Referee: Shaelyn Holdaway

August 24, 2025
09:00

Manitoba	4–0	Northwest Territories
Petruskavich 11'; Zeid 27'; Lavoie 60'; Waller 71'	Report

CBS Soccer Field
Referee: Victoria Warner
August 24, 2025
09:00

Saskatchewan	6–0	Yukon
Michel 14' (pen.), 20', 40'; Zimmer 59', 66'; Pegg 73'	Report

Fortis Canada Games Complex
Referee: Nicole Rapin

==== 5th to 8th ====
5th to 8th
August 23
Prince Edward Island	1
Newfoundland and Labrador	0
August 23
British Columbia	5
New Brunswick	0

5th / 6th
August 24
Prince Edward Island	2
British Columbia	3
7th / 8th
August 24
Newfoundland and Labrador	0
New Brunswick	3

August 23, 2025
13:30

Prince Edward Island	1–0	Newfoundland and Labrador
Langley 60'	Report

King George V Park
Referee: Fatima Morabite
August 23, 2025
13:30

British Columbia	5–0	New Brunswick
Hill 34', 49'; Dirom 61'; Martel 71' (o.g.); Rosse 80'	Report

CBS Soccer Field
Referee: Victoria Warner

August 24, 2025
12:30

Newfoundland and Labrador	0–3	New Brunswick
	Report	Bourgeois 26' (pen.); Rose 42' (o.g.); Rioux 72'

CBS Soccer Field
Referee: Shaelyn Holdaway
August 24, 2025
12:30

Prince Edward Island	2–3	British Columbia
Rickards 44' (o.g.); Reardon 67'	Report	Boogemans 66', 72'; Dirom 80'

Fortis Canada Games Complex
Referee: Emma Blanchet

==== Medal round ====
Semifinals
August 23
Ontario (p)	0 (5)
Alberta	0 (4)
August 23
Quebec	1
Nova Scotia	0

Final
August 24
Ontario	1
Quebec	0
Third place
August 24
Alberta	0 (1)
Nova Scotia (p)	0 (4)

August 23, 2025
16:30

Ontario	0–0	Alberta
	Report
Penalties
Morra (penalty scored); Oppong (penalty scored); Nembhard (penalty missed); Rueffer (penalty scored); Omeze (penalty scored); Cochrane (penalty scored)	5–4	(penalty scored) Colbert; (penalty scored) Monck; (penalty scored) Schepp; (penalty scored) Tabot; (penalty missed) Dancocks; (penalty missed) Toye

King George V Park
Referee: Laura McNicholas
August 23, 2025
16:30

Quebec	1–0	Nova Scotia
Lanni 9'	Report

Fortis Canada Games Complex
Referee: Lillian Ryu

August 24, 2025
11:00

Alberta	0–0	Nova Scotia
	Report
Penalties
Monck (penalty scored); Jones (penalty missed); Tabot (penalty missed)	1–4	(penalty scored) Hall; (penalty scored) Buchanan; (penalty scored) Sherlock; (penalty scored) McDow

King George V Park
Referee: Lillian Ryu
August 24, 2025
14:00

Ontario	1–0	Quebec
Omeze 8'	Report

King George V Park
Referee: Angelina Baldino

=== Final standings ===
Place	Team
1st place, gold medalist(s)	Ontario
2nd place, silver medalist(s)	Quebec
3rd place, bronze medalist(s)	Nova Scotia
4	Alberta
5	British Columbia
6	Prince Edward Island
7	New Brunswick
8	Newfoundland and Labrador
9	Saskatchewan
10	Yukon
11	Manitoba
12	Northwest Territories

== See also ==
- Soccer at the Canada Games
- Canada Games
