= Ahmed Mansour =

Ahmed Mansour may refer to:

- Ahmed Subhy Mansour (born 1949), Egyptian-American Islamic scholar
- Ahmed Mansour (journalist) (born 1962), Egyptian journalist
- Ahmed Ayman Mansour (born 1994), Egyptian footballer

== See also ==
- Ahmad Mansour (born 2000), a Canadian soccer player
- Ahmad Mansour Al-Ahmad Al-Sabah (born 1969), Kuwaiti politician
- Ahmed Mansoor, Emirati blogger, one of the UAE Five
