= Christian Greco-Taylor =

Canadian soccer player (born 2005)

Personal information
- Full name: Christian Dean Greco-Taylor
- Date of birth: February 20, 2005 (age 21)
- Place of birth: Calgary, Alberta, Canada
- Height: 1.75 m (5 ft 9 in)
- Position: Defender

Team information
- Current team: Pacific FC
- Number: 15

Youth career
- 2016–2019: Calgary Foothills FC
- 2019–2023: Vancouver Whitecaps FC

Senior career*
Years	Team	Apps	(Gls)
2023	Whitecaps FC 2	21	(0)
2024–	Pacific FC	63	(0)

International career^{‡}
2024–	Canada U20	6	(0)
- * Club domestic league appearances and goals as of October 27, 2026 ‡ National team caps and goals as of July 30, 2024

Christian Dean Greco-Taylor (born February 20, 2005) is a Canadian professional soccer player who plays for Canadian Premier League club Pacific FC.

== Early life ==
Greco-Taylor began playing youth soccer with Calgary Foothills FC in 2016, before joining the Vancouver Whitecaps Academy in August 2019.

== Club career ==
In 2023, Greco-Taylor played with Whitecaps FC 2 in MLS Next Pro, recording two assists in 21 appearances.

In March 2024, Greco-Taylor signed with Pacific FC of the Canadian Premier League. With Pacific, he transitioned to playing fullback, after previously being a midfielder. He made his debut for his new club on May 17, entering the match as an early injury substitute for Aly Ndom against Atlético Ottawa. In January 2025, he went on a training stint with Bundesliga club VfL Bochum, who have a strategic partnership agreement with Pacific FC.

== International career ==
In February 2024, Greco Taylor was named to the Canada U20 team for the 2024 CONCACAF U-20 Championship qualifying tournament. He appeared in all three of the team's matches, including one start, at the tournament. Greco-Taylor was subsequently named to the squad for the official tournament in July.

== Career statistics ==
As of October 24, 2025

Club	Season	League			Playoffs		Domestic Cup		Continental		Total	
Club	Season	Division	Apps	Goals	Apps	Goals	Apps	Goals	Apps	Goals	Apps	Goals
Whitecaps FC 2	2023	MLS Next Pro	21	0	–		–		–		21	0
Pacific FC	2024	Canadian Premier League	14	0	1	0	0	0	–		15	0
Pacific FC	2025	Canadian Premier League	24	0	–		0	0	–		15	0
Pacific FC	Total		38	0	1	0	0	0	0	0	39	0
Career total			59	0	1	0	0	0	0	0	60	0
