= Tristan Marshall =

Vincentian footballer (born 2003)

Personal information
- Full name: Tristan Kendal Marshall
- Date of birth: December 19, 2003 (age 22)
- Place of birth: Toronto, Ontario, Canada
- Height: 6 ft 1 in (1.85 m)
- Position: Defender

Team information
- Current team: Pacific FC
- Number: 2

Youth career
- Toronto Skillz FC

College career
Years	Team	Apps	(Gls)
2021–2023	TMU Bold (Note: Ryerson Rams changed their name to TMU Bold in 2022)	21	(6)

Senior career*
Years	Team	Apps	(Gls)
2019–2021	Toronto Skillz FC	5	(0)
2022–2023	North Toronto Nitros	8	(0)
2024–2025	Scrosoppi FC	30	(0)
2024	→ Scrosoppi FC B	0	(0)
2026	Makedonikos	3	(0)
2026–	Pacific FC	17	(0)

International career^{‡}
2019	Saint Vincent and the Grenadines U17	3	(0)
2020–2021	Saint Vincent and the Grenadines U20	6	(0)
2019–	Saint Vincent and the Grenadines	19	(0)
- * Club domestic league appearances and goals as of October 27, 2026 ‡ National team caps and goals as of November 15, 2025

Tristan Kendal Marshall (born December 19, 2003) is a footballer who plays for Pacific FC in the Canadian Premier League. Born in Canada, he represents the Saint Vincent and the Grenadines national team. He plays as a centre-back.

== University career ==
In 2021, he began playing for the Toronto Metropolitan University (previously Ryerson University) men's soccer team, making one appearance in his first season. On October 2, 2022, he scored twice in a match against the Queen's Gaels for his first university goals.

== Club career ==
Marshall made his debut with Toronto Skillz FC in League1 Ontario on July 28, 2019, against Oakville Blue Devils FC.

In 2022, he played for North Toronto Nitros in League 1 Ontario. In 2024, he joined Scrosoppi FC, being named a league First Team All-Star at the end of the season.

In January 2026, he signed with Super League Greece 2 club Makedonikos until June 2026.

In April 2026, he joined Canadian Premier League club Pacific FC on a free transfer, signing a one-year contract with club options for 2027 and 2028. He made his debut on April 5, 2026 against Cavalry FC.

== International career ==
Born in Canada, Marshall represents the Saint Vincent and the Grenadines national team, where his parents were born. In 2019, he played for the U17 team at the 2019 CONCACAF U-17 Championship qualifying tournament. He captained the U20 team at the 2020 CONCACAF U-20 Championship qualifying tournament. At age 15, he made his debut for the senior team, at the 2019 Windward Islands Tournament, playing 90 minutes in their final match of the tournament, helping the team win the tournament.

== Career statistics ==
=== Club ===
As of April 19, 2026

Club	Season	League			Playoffs		Domestic Cup		League Cup		Total	
Club	Season	Division	Apps	Goals	Apps	Goals	Apps	Goals	Apps	Goals	Apps	Goals
Toronto Skillz FC	2019	League1 Ontario	2	0	–		–		–		2	0
Toronto Skillz FC	2021	League1 Ontario Summer Championship	3	0	–		–		–		3	0
Toronto Skillz FC	Total		5	0	0	0	0	0	0	0	5	0
North Toronto Nitros	2022	League1 Ontario	4	0	0	0	–		–		4	0
North Toronto Nitros	2023	League1 Ontario	4	0	–		–		–		4	0
North Toronto Nitros	Total		8	0	0	0	0	0	0	0	8	0
Scrosoppi FC	2024	League1 Ontario Premier	16	0	–		–		1	0	17	0
Scrosoppi FC	2025	League1 Ontario Premier	14	0	–		1	0	1	0	16	0
Scrosoppi FC	Total		30	0	0	0	1	0	2	0	33	0
Scrosoppi FC B	2024	League2 Ontario	0	0	2	0	–		–		2	0
Makedonikos	2025–26	Super League Greece 2	3	0	–		0	0	–		3	0
Pacific FC	2026	Canadian Premier League	3	0	0	0	0	0	–		3	0
Career total			49	0	2	0	1	0	2	0	54	0

=== International ===
As of matches played November 15, 2025

National team	Year	Apps	Goals
Saint Vincent and the Grenadines	2019	1	0
Saint Vincent and the Grenadines	2020	0	0
Saint Vincent and the Grenadines	2021	2	0
Saint Vincent and the Grenadines	2022	1	0
Saint Vincent and the Grenadines	2023	0	0
Saint Vincent and the Grenadines	2024	9	0
Saint Vincent and the Grenadines	2025	6	0
Total		19	0
