= SixFive Sports & Entertainment =

Canadian sports ownership group

- Type: Limited partnership
- Industry: Sports management
- Founded: 2018; 8 years ago
- Founders: Rob Friend; Josh Simpson; Dean Shillington
- Headquarters: Vancouver, British Columbia, Canada
- Area served: Canada
- Key people: Dean Shillington (Chairman); Rob Friend (CEO); Josh Simpson (President)
- Products: Professional soccer clubs, stadium development
- Owners: Rob Friend, Josh Simpson, Dean Shillington, Starlight Investments
- Subsidiaries: Pacific FC; Vancouver FC; SixFive Stadium Experience
- Website: sixfivesports.com

SixFive Sports & Entertainment LP is a Canadian privately held sports ownership and investment group headquartered in Vancouver, British Columbia. The company is the parent of two professional soccer clubs in the Canadian Premier League (CPL): Pacific FC, based in Langford, and Vancouver FC, based in the Township of Langley. SixFive is the only multi-club owner in the league. The group has also stated an intention to assemble a global portfolio of professional football clubs and operates an affiliated small-format stadium-development business, SixFive Stadium Experience.

== History ==
SixFive Sports & Entertainment was established in 2018 by Vancouver-based financier Dean Shillington, the founder and president of asset-based lender Knightsbridge Capital, together with former Canada men's national soccer team players Rob Friend and Josh Simpson. The trio became equal partners in the venture, with Shillington serving as chairman, Friend as chief executive officer and Simpson as president. According to interviews given by the founders, the name "SixFive" is a reference to the shared height (six feet, five inches) of Friend and Shillington.

The group's first sporting investment was Pacific FC, one of the seven inaugural clubs of the Canadian Premier League at the league's 2019 launch. Pacific won the 2021 Canadian Premier League final in December 2021, defeating defending champions Forge FC 1–0 at Tim Hortons Field in Hamilton on a 59th-minute goal by Alessandro Hojabrpour.

On 10 November 2021, the Canadian Premier League announced that it had awarded an expansion franchise in the Vancouver area to SixFive. The club, later branded as Vancouver FC, was launched on 2 November 2022 and began play in the 2023 season. With the addition of Vancouver FC, SixFive became the only ownership group operating two clubs in the CPL.

== Leadership ==
The group is led by three equal partners:

- Dean Shillington, chairman. Shillington is the founder and president of Knightsbridge Capital, a Vancouver-based asset-based lender that also acts as a financial advisor on the group's transactions.
- Rob Friend, chief executive officer of SixFive and of Pacific FC. Friend earned more than 30 caps for Canada and spent more than two decades as a professional player in the Bundesliga, Eredivisie and Major League Soccer before transitioning to sports administration.
- Josh Simpson, president of SixFive and of Pacific FC. Simpson, a former Canadian international, spent over a decade as a professional in European leagues. He took on the role of president of Vancouver FC ahead of its inaugural season.

Starlight Investments, a Toronto-based private real-estate investment manager, is also a financial backer of the consortium.

== Holdings ==
SixFive's simultaneous ownership of two clubs in the same domestic league is uncommon in professional football and has attracted scrutiny under multi-club ownership rules set by FIFA and confederation regulators. The group has publicly cited those considerations, alongside stadium-lease timing in Langford, as factors in its 2025 decision to explore a sale of Pacific FC while retaining Vancouver FC.

=== Pacific FC ===
Pacific FC was founded in 2018 and began play in the inaugural 2019 season of the Canadian Premier League. Under SixFive's ownership the club won the 2021 CPL Championship and went on to represent Canada in the 2022 CONCACAF League. The club has played its home matches at Starlight Stadium in Langford on Vancouver Island throughout the SixFive era.

In April 2024, media reports suggested that SixFive was looking to divest the club; the ownership group rebuked the claims at the time, with then-CEO Rob Friend stating that the team was "not for sale". In September 2025, however, SixFive formally announced that it was exploring a sale of Pacific FC, citing the expiration of the club's stadium lease in Langford and a desire to broaden the CPL's ownership base ahead of the 2026 FIFA World Cup co-hosted by Canada, Mexico and the United States. Knightsbridge Capital was retained to manage the sale process.

=== Vancouver FC ===
Vancouver FC began play in the Canadian Premier League in 2023 following the November 2021 expansion award. The club's home is a purpose-built modular venue at Willoughby Community Park, adjacent to the Langley Events Centre in the Township of Langley. The first head coach was Iranian-American manager Afshin Ghotbi, who was introduced at the club's official launch event on 2 November 2022. SixFive has publicly stated that, despite the proposed divestment of Pacific FC, it has no intention of selling Vancouver FC.

=== SixFive Stadium Experience ===
SixFive operates an affiliated stadium-development arm, SixFive Stadium Experience, focused on small-format professional soccer venues in Canada. The business was set up in part to develop Vancouver FC's Willoughby Stadium, which was constructed in approximately six weeks ahead of the 2023 CPL season.

=== Potential European acquisitions ===
SixFive has publicly stated an ambition to acquire a club in European football, particularly in English football. The group was reported among the parties to have explored a takeover of English club Huddersfield Town A.F.C. in 2023, before the club was ultimately sold to American investor Kevin M. Nagle.

== Legal and financial disputes ==
=== Dispute with the City of Langford ===
The September 2025 announcement that SixFive was exploring a sale of Pacific FC precipitated a public dispute with the City of Langford, the municipality that owns Starlight Stadium and the adjoining indoor training centre used by Pacific FC. In statements made to local and national media, Langford alleged that the club had accrued approximately CA$691,477.77 in arrears under the indoor training centre agreement, an amount the city said it had "held in abeyance" pending negotiation of a longer-term stadium-use deal, and had failed to remit a contractually required CA$1-per-ticket levy on any of its eleven home matches in Langford during the 2025 season.

The dispute escalated after Pacific FC president Josh Simpson, in remarks to reporters, suggested that relations with the municipality had deteriorated following the departure of long-serving former mayor Stew Young. In a written response, Langford described Simpson's comments as "inflammatory" and "factually incorrect", and reiterated the outstanding sums it said were owed by the club. The lease for Starlight Stadium was set to expire at the end of the 2025 season; as of late 2025 the parties had not initiated formal litigation.

=== Ghotbi v. SixFive Sports & Entertainment ===
In December 2025, former Vancouver FC head coach Afshin Ghotbi filed a notice of civil claim in the Supreme Court of British Columbia against SixFive Sports & Entertainment and managing partner Dean Shillington. Ghotbi alleges that in July 2023, after being told by SixFive director Rob Friend that Vancouver FC was experiencing cash-flow difficulties, he advanced the club a CA$500,000 loan at an annual interest rate of 12 percent, with a repayment date of 14 July 2024. The claim states the loan went unpaid on schedule and that, as of filing, Ghotbi is owed CA$715,879.45 in principal and accrued interest.

According to the claim, Shillington informed Ghotbi after the repayment demand that SixFive could not satisfy the loan because the group was actively pursuing the sale of its primary assets, including Pacific FC, and was subject to multiple senior secured charges ranking in priority to Ghotbi's interest.

SixFive and Shillington filed a counterclaim seeking general and punitive damages against Ghotbi for alleged breach of confidence and abuse of process. In a public statement, the group said it would "not litigate Mr. Ghotbi's claim in the media" and would "proceed with the usual court process to establish the facts and applicable law regarding the loan". None of the allegations in either the claim or the counterclaim have been tested in court.

== See also ==
- Canadian Premier League
- Pacific FC
- Vancouver FC
