= Dario Zanatta =

Canadian soccer player (born 1997)

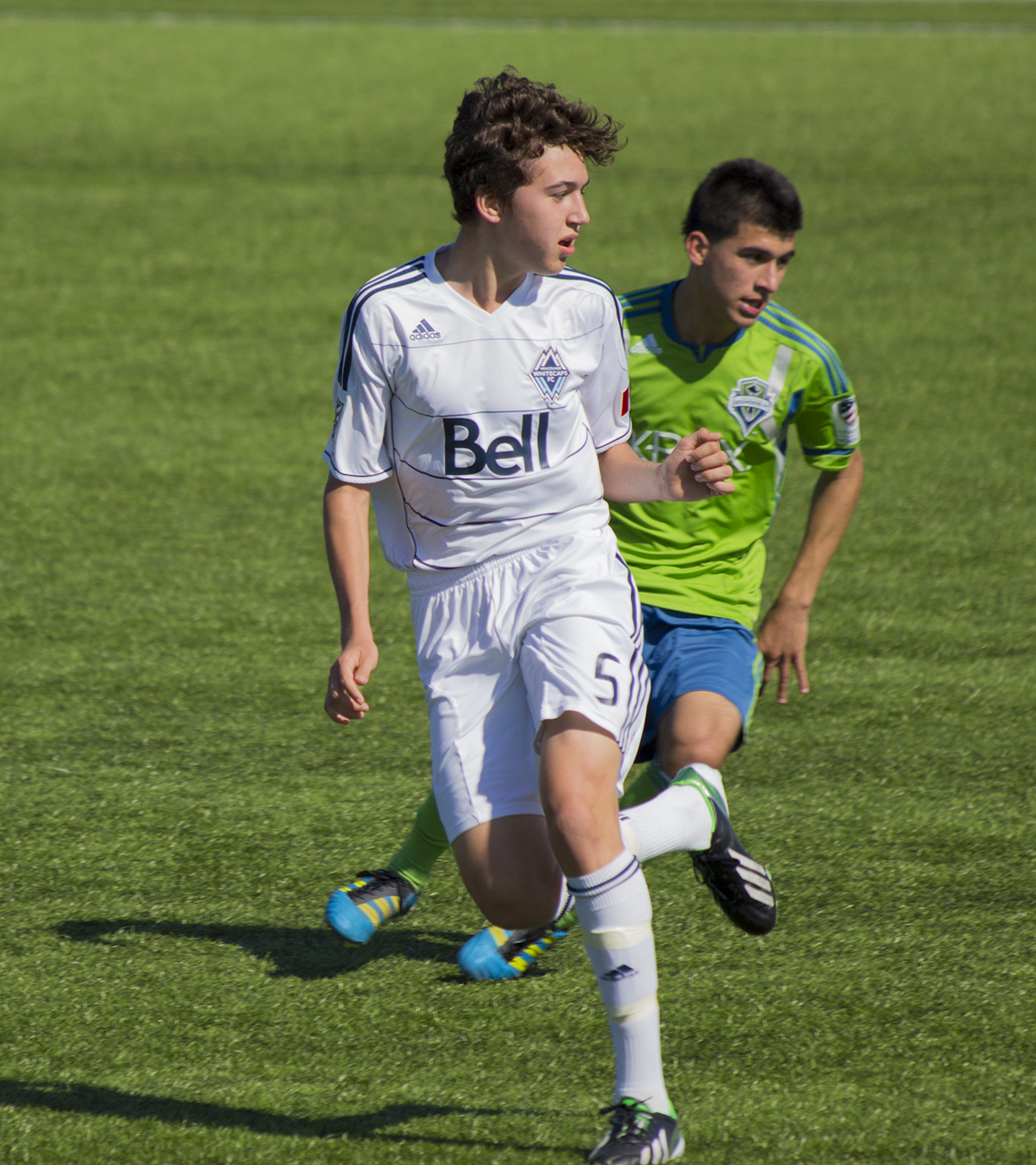
- Zanatta with Vancouver Whitecaps FC in 2013

Personal information
- Full name: Dario Zanatta
- Date of birth: May 24, 1997 (age 29)
- Place of birth: Victoria, British Columbia, Canada
- Height: 1.85 m (6 ft 1 in)
- Position: Forward

Youth career
- 2002–2007: Gorge FC
- 2008–2011: Victoria Capitals
- 2011–2015: Vancouver Whitecaps FC
- 2015: Heart of Midlothian

Senior career*
Years	Team	Apps	(Gls)
2015–2019	Heart of Midlothian	15	(1)
2016–2017	→ Queen's Park (loan)	24	(6)
2017–2018	→ Raith Rovers (loan)	25	(7)
2018–2019	→ Alloa Athletic (loan)	34	(6)
2019–2020	Partick Thistle	23	(3)
2020–2021	Ayr United	13	(0)
2021–2022	Raith Rovers	33	(8)
2022–2024	Hamilton Academical	36	(1)
2024–2025	Pacific FC	50	(8)
2026	Tormenta FC	0	(0)

International career^{‡}
2013	Canada U16	2	(2)
2014	Canada U18	1	(0)
2015–2017	Canada U20	7	(1)
- * Club domestic league appearances and goals as of October 24, 2025 ‡ National team caps and goals as of June 7, 2020

Dario Zanatta (born May 24, 1997) is a Canadian professional soccer player who plays as a forward.

Zanatta has spent most of his senior career in Scotland and has previously played for Heart of Midlothian, Queen's Park, Alloa Athletic, Partick Thistle, Ayr United, and Hamilton Academical. He then returned to Canada to play for Pacific FC. He has also represented Canada at youth level.

== Early life ==
Zanatta grew up playing for Gorge Soccer Association and Lower Island Metro during his childhood years. As a teenager, he played as a forward and midfielder for the Victoria Capitals youth program before joining Vancouver Whitecaps Residency in 2011, aged 14. Zanatta was offered a spot in the academy and slowly worked his way up the academy ranks. He left Vancouver in February 2015, having been unable to agree to terms on a contract and set his ambitions on Europe and went on trial with several European clubs, including Ipswich Town, IFK Göteborg and Heart of Midlothian.

== Club career ==
=== Scotland ===
Zanatta signed his first professional contract on August 6, 2015, signing with Scottish Premiership side Heart of Midlothian, on a two-year contract, initially joining up with the club's under-20 side. Zanatta made his first team debut on October 31, coming on as a 70th-minute substitute in a Scottish Premiership match against Partick Thistle at Firhill Stadium, replacing Sam Nicholson in a 4–0 win. In January 2016, Zanatta was originally expected to be loaned to a lower division club, but he impressed Hearts coach Robbie Neilson enough to stay with the first team.

In September 2016, Hearts announced they had loaned Zanatta to Queen's Park of the Scottish League One on a one-month emergency loan. He made his debut for Queen's Park on September 24, 2016 against Albion Rovers, impressing after only being with the squad for one training session. In November 2016, Zanatta scored his first goal as a professional in a match against Stranraer.

Zanatta returned from loan in December 2016, and made his Hearts season debut against Kilmarnock, drawing and missing a penalty. On 31 January 2017, Zanatta joined Queen's Park on another loan, this time, until the end of season.

On August 31, 2017, it was revealed that Zanatta had joined Raith Rovers on a loan deal until the end of the season. After impressing in his loan spell, Zanatta was recalled by Hearts in January 2018, and his departure was considered a significant blow to Rovers' promotion battle with Ayr United. In his first appearance with Hearts after his recall, Zanatta would score his first goal for the club in a 3–0 win over Hamilton Academical. At the end of January 2018, Zanatta was loaned again to Raith Rovers for the rest of the 2017–18 season.

In August 2018, Zanatta moved on loan to Scottish Championship club Alloa Athletic until January 2019. He would be named Championship player of the month for December 2018. After a strong first half of the season with Alloa, Zanatta was rewarded with a one-year contract extension with Hearts, with his loan being extended to the end of the 2018–19 season.

Zanatta left Hearts in August 2019 and signed a two-year contract with Partick Thistle. Zanatta made his Jags debut on the 31st of August against Ayr United, winning a penalty for the opener before assisting Shea Gordon after dribbling past 5 opposition players. He was named man of the match on his debut appearance. Zanatta scored his first goal for the Jags in a 3–1 away league win against Inverness Caledonian Thistle. Following Thistle's early relegation due to the COVID-19 pandemic, Zanatta invoked a release clause in his contract and he left the club on June 7, 2020.

In July 2020, Zanatta signed with Scottish Championship club Ayr United on a one-year deal. He scored on his debut for Ayr in a Scottish League Cup tie against Albion Rovers on October 6, 2020.

In March 2021, Zanatta signed a pre-contract with Scottish Championship club Raith Rovers for the 2021–22 season. He would make his debut for the club in July 2021 in a League Cup tie against Cowdenbeath.

In August 2022, Zanatta moved to fellow Scottish Championship side Hamilton Academical for an undisclosed transfer fee and signed a two-year contract.

=== North America ===
In February 2024, Pacific FC announced the signing of the Victoria native on a free transfer, ahead of the 2024 Canadian Premier League season.

In January 2026, he signed with Tormenta FC in USL League One.

== International career ==
In August 2016, Zanatta was called up to the Canada U-20 team for a pair of friendlies against Costa Rica and scored a goal in the first match. In February 2017, Zanatta was named to Canada's roster for the 2017 CONCACAF U-20 Championship

Zanatta was named to the Canadian U-23 provisional roster for the 2020 CONCACAF Men's Olympic Qualifying Championship on February 26, 2020.

== Personal life ==
Zanatta grew up in Victoria, British Columbia and attended Prospect Lake Elementary School, Royal Oak Middle School, then Holy Cross Regional High School in Surrey, British Columbia and graduated from Burnaby Central Secondary School.

== Career statistics ==
As of October 24, 2025

Appearances and goals by club, season and competition
Club	Season	League			National Cup		League Cup		Other (Note: Includes appearances in the Scottish Challenge Cup and Championship play-offs.)		Total	
Club	Season	Division	Apps	Goals	Apps	Goals	Apps	Goals	Apps	Goals	Apps	Goals
Heart of Midlothian	2015–16	Scottish Premiership	13	0	1	0	0	0	0	0	14	0
Heart of Midlothian	2016–17	Scottish Premiership	1	0	2	0	0	0	0	0	3	0
Heart of Midlothian	2017–18	Scottish Premiership	1	1	0	0	0	0	0	0	1	1
Heart of Midlothian	2018–19	Scottish Premiership	0	0	0	0	0	0	0	0	0	0
Heart of Midlothian	2019–20	Scottish Premiership	0	0	0	0	4	0	0	0	4	0
Heart of Midlothian	Total		15	1	3	0	4	0	0	0	22	1
Queen's Park (loan)	2016–17	Scottish League One	24	6	0	0	0	0	0	0	24	6
Raith Rovers (loan)	2017–18	Scottish League One	25	7	0	0	0	0	2	0	27	7
Alloa Athletic (loan)	2018–19	Scottish Championship	34	6	2	1	0	0	3	1	39	8
Partick Thistle	2019–20	Scottish Championship	23	3	2	0	0	0	0	0	25	3
Ayr United	2020–21	Scottish Championship	13	0	0	0	5	1	0	0	18	1
Raith Rovers	2021–22	Scottish Championship	31	8	3	0	6	2	5	0	45	10
Raith Rovers	2022–23	Scottish Championship	2	0	0	0	3	0	0	0	5	0
Raith Rovers	Total		33	8	3	0	9	2	5	0	50	10
Hamilton Academical	2022–23	Scottish Championship	27	1	3	0	0	0	8	5	38	6
Hamilton Academical	2023–24	Scottish League One	9	0	1	0	3	0	2	2	15	2
Hamilton Academical	Total		36	1	4	0	3	0	10	7	53	8
Pacific FC	2024	Canadian Premier League	24	5	4	0	—		1	0	29	5
Pacific FC	2025	Canadian Premier League	26	3	1	0	—		—		27	3
Pacific FC	Total		50	8	5	0	0	0	1	0	56	8
Total			253	40	19	1	21	3	21	8	314	52

== Honours ==
Raith Rovers

- Scottish Challenge Cup: 2021–22

Hamilton Academical

- Scottish Challenge Cup: 2022–23
