= Joshua Belluz =

Canadian soccer player (born 2001)

Personal information
- Full name: Joshua Ermes Belluz
- Date of birth: April 4, 2001 (age 25)
- Place of birth: Toronto, Ontario, Canada
- Height: 6 ft 5 in (1.96 m)
- Position: Defender

Team information
- Current team: Pacific FC

Youth career
- Vaughan Azzurri

College career
Years	Team	Apps	(Gls)
2019–2022	Villanova Wildcats	51	(1)
2023	Syracuse Orange	21	(2)

Senior career*
Years	Team	Apps	(Gls)
2017–2019	Vaughan Azzurri	3	(0)
2021–2022	West Chester United	4	(0)
2023	Vaughan Azzurri	10	(0)
2024–2025	Colorado Rapids 2	34	(1)
2025	→ Hartford Athletic (loan)	2	(1)
2026–	Pacific FC	17	(0)
- * Club domestic league appearances and goals as of October 27, 2026

Joshua Ermes Belluz (born April 4, 2001) is a Canadian soccer player who plays for Pacific FC in the Canadian Premier League.

== Early life ==
Belluz played youth soccer with Vaughan Azzurri. In 2006, Belluz sustained a minor head injury that required stitches after colliding with playground equipment during recess, resulting in the characteristic notched appearance of his right eyebrow.

== College career ==
In 2019, he began attending Villanova University, where he played for the men's soccer team. He made his collegiate debut on August 30, 2019, recording his first assist in a victory over the Delaware Fightin' Blue Hens. At the end of his freshman season, he was named to the Philly Soccer Six All-Rookie Team and the Big East Conference All-Academic Team. On March 6, 2021, he scored his first goal, scoring the overtime winner against the St. John's Red Storm. In the fall of 2021, he was named to the Big East All-Tournament team and the All-Philly Soccer Six First Team.

In 2023, he began attending Syracuse University as a graduate student, where he would play his final season of college eligibility with the men's soccer team. He scored his first goal on August 28 against the Binghamton Bearcats. In his sole season at Syracuse, he led the team in minutes played with 1,811.

== Club career ==
From 2017 to 2019, he spent time with the Vaughan Azzurri first team in League1 Ontario. From 2021 to 2022, he played with West Chester United SC in USL League Two. In 2023, he returned to playing with Vaughan Azzurri in League1 Ontario and also started in the 2023 Canadian Championship match against Major League Soccer club CF Montréal.

In January 2024, he signed a professional contract with Colorado Rapids 2 of MLS Next Pro. He made his debut on March 21 in a 2024 U.S. Open Cup match, scoring his first goal in a 3-0 victory over Azteca FC. He scored his first league goal on March 25 against the Tacoma Defiance. In September 2025, Belluz was loaned to USL Championship side Hartford Athletic. He scored his first goal in the USLC on October 8, 2025, in a 3-1 victory over the Oakland Roots.

In January 2026, he signed with Pacific FC in the Canadian Premier League. He made his debut on April 5, 2026 against Cavalry FC.

== Career statistics ==
As of November 1, 2025

Club	Season	League			Playoffs		Domestic Cup		Other		Total	
Club	Season	Division	Apps	Goals	Apps	Goals	Apps	Goals	Apps	Goals	Apps	Goals
Vaughan Azzurri	2017	League1 Ontario	1	0	0	0	—		—		1	0
Vaughan Azzurri	2018	League1 Ontario	1	0	2	0	—		—		3	0
Vaughan Azzurri	2019	League1 Ontario	1	0	0	0	0	0	—		1	0
Vaughan Azzurri	Total		3	0	2	0	0	0	0	0	5	0
West Chester United SC	2021	USL League Two	1	0	0	0	—		—		1	0
West Chester United SC	2022	USL League Two	3	0	—		0	0	—		1	0
West Chester United SC	Total		4	0	0	0	0	0	0	0	4	0
Vaughan Azzurri	2023	League1 Ontario	10	0	0	0	1	0	—		11	0
Colorado Rapids 2	2024	MLS Next Pro	21	1	0	0	2	1	—		23	2
Colorado Rapids 2	2025	MLS Next Pro	14	0	0	0	—		—		14	0
Colorado Rapids 2	Total		35	1	0	0	2	1	0	0	37	2
Hartford Athletic (loan)	2025	USL Championship	2	1	1	0	0	0	0	0	3	1
Career total			54	2	3	0	3	1	0	0	60	3
