= Fin Tugwell =

Canadian soccer player (born 2003)

Personal information
- Date of birth: February 2, 2003 (age 23)
- Place of birth: North Vancouver, British Columbia, Canada
- Height: 6 ft 3 in (1.91 m)
- Position: Defender

Youth career
- Mountain United FC

College career
Years	Team	Apps	(Gls)
2022–	Victoria Vikes	46	(2)

Senior career*
Years	Team	Apps	(Gls)
2025–	Pacific FC	4	(0)
- * Club domestic league appearances and goals as of August 15, 2025

Fin Tugwell (born February 2, 2003) is a Canadian soccer player who plays for Pacific FC in the Canadian Premier League.

== Early life ==
Tugwell played youth soccer with Mountain United FC.

== University career ==
In 2021, Tugwell began attending the University of Victoria, where he played for the men's soccer team. He reshirted the 2021 season and began playing in 2022. On October 20, 2023, he scored hie first goal in a match against the UFV Cascades. In 2023, he was named a Canada West Second Team All-Star. In 2024, he was named the Canada West Defensive Player of the Year, a Canada West First Team All-Star, and a U Sports First Team All-Canadian. In 2025, he was named a Canada West First Team All Star and U Sports Second Team All-Canadian.

== Club career ==
At the 2025 CPL-U Sports Draft, Tugwell was selected in the second round (12th overall) by Pacific FC. In March 2025, he signed a U Sports contract with the club. In August 2025, he departed the club to return to university, as per the terms of his U Sports contract, with the club retaining his rights for the 2026 season. In April 2026, he signed another U Sports contract for the 2026 season.
