= Yann Toualy =

Ivorian footballer (born 2001)

- Toualy in 2026

Personal information
- Date of birth: June 1, 2001 (age 25)
- Place of birth: Abidjan, Ivory Coast
- Height: 1.60 m (5 ft 3 in)
- Position: Forward

Team information
- Current team: Pacific FC
- Number: 64

Youth career
- 2011–2018: CS St-Laurent

College career
Years	Team	Apps	(Gls)
2021	Hill Rebels	10	(2)

Senior career*
Years	Team	Apps	(Gls)
2019	FC Gatineau	6	(0)
2020–2021	CS St-Hubert	14	(1)
2022–2024	CS St-Laurent	43	(31)
2024	→ Vermont Green FC (loan)	4	(1)
2025–	Pacific FC	49	(9)
- * Club domestic league appearances and goals as of October 25, 2026

Yann Régis Toualy (born 1 June 2001) is an Ivorian footballer who plays for Pacific FC in the Canadian Premier League.

== Early life ==
Born in the Ivory Coast, Toualy moved to Canada at age nine. He played youth soccer with CS St-Laurent from U10 to U17 level.

== College career ==
In the fall of 2021, he began attending Hill College, where he played for the men's soccer team.

== Club career ==
In 2019, he played with FC Gatineau in the Première ligue de soccer du Québec. In 2020 and 2021, he played with CS St-Hubert. In 2022, he joined CS St-Laurent. In 2022, he had trials with Atlético Ottawa of the Canadian Premier League, Toronto FC II of MLS Next Pro, and Detroit City FC of the USL Championship. On May 29, 2024, he was loaned to Vermont Green in USL League Two until August. Later in 2024, he went on trial with Gençler Birliği in Northern Cyprus.

In April 2025, he signed a professional contract with Pacific FC in the Canadian Premier League. On June 28, 2025, he scored his first goal in a 4-4 draw against Vancouver FC. On July 12, 2025, he scored a hat trick in a 3-2 victory over HFX Wanderers FC, which was just the 10th hat trick in league history.

== International career ==
In December 2022, Toualy was called up to a camp with the Canada national futsal team.

== Career statistics ==
As of October 24, 2025

Club	Season	League			Playoffs		National Cup		League Cup		Total	
Club	Season	Division	Apps	Goals	Apps	Goals	Apps	Goals	Apps	Goals	Apps	Goals
FC Gatineau	2019	Première ligue de soccer du Québec	6	0	—		—		0	0	6	0
CS St-Hubert	2020	Première ligue de soccer du Québec	8	0	—		—		—		8	0
CS St-Hubert	2021	Première ligue de soccer du Québec	6	1	—		—		—		6	1
CS St-Hubert	Total		14	1	0	0	0	0	0	0	14	1
CS St-Laurent	2022	Première ligue de soccer du Québec	19	15	—		—		0	0	19	15
CS St-Laurent	2023	Ligue1 Québec	18	12	—		—		3	2	21	14
CS St-Laurent	2024	Ligue1 Québec	6	4	—		3	0	0	0	9	4
CS St-Laurent	Total		43	31	0	0	3	0	3	2	49	33
Vermont Green FC (loan)	2024	USL League Two	4	1	0	0	0	0	—		4	1
Pacific FC	2025	Canadian Premier League	25	4	—		0	0	—		25	4
Career total			92	37	0	0	3	0	3	2	98	39
