= Daniel de Pauli =

Brazilian footballer

Daniel Oliveira
Personal information
- Full name: Daniel de Pauli Oliveira
- Date of birth: 6 August 1999 (age 27)
- Place of birth: Goiânia, Brazil
- Position: Defensive midfielder

Team information
- Current team: Goiatuba

Youth career
- Goiás

Senior career*
Years	Team	Apps	(Gls)
2019	Goiás	33	(0)
2022	→ Aparecidense (loan)	10	(0)
2023	→ Athletic Club (loan)	1	(0)
2023–2024	Cerrado		
2024	Goiânia	8	(1)
2024	Krumovgrad	12	(0)
2025	Pacific FC	7	(0)
2026–	Goiatuba	16	(0)
- * Club domestic league appearances and goals as of 19 November 2026

Daniel de Pauli Oliveira (born 6 August 1999), known as Daniel Oliveira or Daniel de Pauli, is a Brazilian professional footballer who plays for Goiatuba. Mainly a defensive midfielder, he can also play as a central defender.

== Club career ==
Born in Goiânia, Goiás, Daniel Oliveira was a Goiás youth graduate. He made his senior debut on 21 August 2019, starting in a 4–1 home routing of Brasiliense, for the year's Copa Verde.

Promoted to the first team ahead of the 2020 season, Daniel Oliveira played his first match of the season on 24 January of that year, coming on as a second-half substitute for Henrique Almeida in a 3–2 Campeonato Goiano home win against Aparecidense. He made his Série A debut on 16 August 2020, replacing Victor Andrade in 1–1 away draw against Palmeiras.

On 29 January 2025, Oliveira signed a one-year contract with an option for 2026 with Canadian Premier League side Pacific FC.

== Career statistics ==
As of 24 January 2021

Club	Season	League			State League		Cup		Continental		Other		Total	
Club	Season	Division	Apps	Goals	Apps	Goals	Apps	Goals	Apps	Goals	Apps	Goals	Apps	Goals
Goiás	2019	Série A	0	0	0	0	0	0	—		2 (Note: Appearance(s) in Copa Verde)	0	2	0
Goiás	2020	Série A	14	0	3	0	0	0	0	0	—		17	0
Career total			14	0	3	0	0	0	0	0	2	0	19	0
