= Marco Bustos =

Canadian soccer player (born 1996)

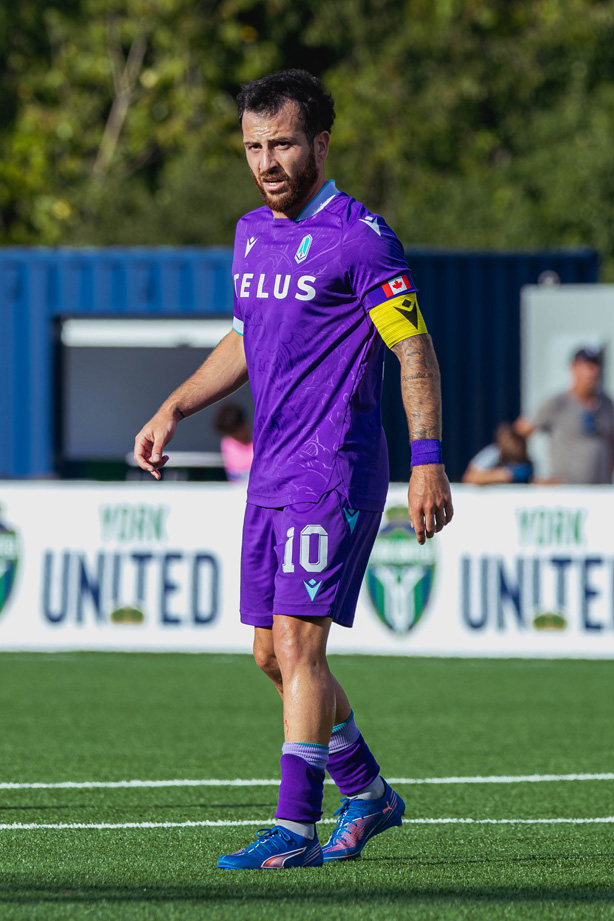

Personal information
- Full name: Marco Antonio Bustos
- Date of birth: April 22, 1996 (age 30)
- Place of birth: Winnipeg, Manitoba, Canada
- Height: 1.68 m (5 ft 6 in)
- Position: Winger

Team information
- Current team: Pacific FC
- Number: 10

Youth career
- Garden City CC
- 2007–2011: FC Northwest
- 2011–2014: Vancouver Whitecaps FC

Senior career*
| Years | Team | Apps | (Gls) |
| 2014 | Vancouver Whitecaps FC U-23 | 7 | (4) |
| 2015–2018 | Vancouver Whitecaps FC | 4 | (0) |
| 2015–2017 | → Whitecaps FC 2 (loan) | 57 | (22) |
| 2018 | → Zacatepec (loan) | 5 | (0) |
| 2018–2019 | Oklahoma City Energy | 16 | (1) |
| 2019 | Valour FC | 25 | (7) |
| 2020–2022 | Pacific FC | 57 | (14) |
| 2023–2024 | Värnamo | 37 | (3) |
| 2025– | Pacific FC | 51 | (10) |

International career^{‡}
| 2013 | Canada U17 | 8 | (0) |
| 2014–2015 | Canada U20 | 6 | (2) |
| 2015–2017 | Canada | 6 | (0) |
- * Club domestic league appearances and goals as of October 27, 2026 ‡ National team caps and goals as of March 22, 2017

Marco Antonio Bustos (born April 22, 1996) is a Canadian professional soccer player who plays as a winger for Canadian Premier League club Pacific FC.

== Early life ==
Bustos was born on April 22, 1996 in Winnipeg, Manitoba, Canada and grew up in the The Maples neighborhood in the city. He began playing soccer at age four with the Garden City CC. Bustos played for FC Northwest in his native Winnipeg for four years before joining the Vancouver Whitecaps's academy in 2011. Bustos played from the U-16 level up, and completed his time at the academy with a 19-goal performance during the 2013-14 USSDA season.

== Club career ==
=== Vancouver Whitecaps ===
Bustos began his senior career with seven games for the Vancouver U-23 PDL side, scoring four goals.

Bustos made his professional debut for Vancouver in the 2014 Canadian Championship, starting a game against Toronto FC on May 7, 2014. On September 15, it was announced Bustos had signed a pre-contract with Vancouver and would officially be added to the team's roster in January 2015. Bustos made his MLS league debut for the Whitecaps against FC Dallas on October 14, 2015. He played in the CONCACAF Champions Cup while playing for the club.

After the 2017 season, Bustos would re-sign an 18-month contract with the Whitecaps, with club options for the 2019, 2020 and 2021 seasons. He would also be loaned to Zacatepec of Ascenso MX for the duration of the 18-month contract. In August 2018, Bustos and Whitecaps FC mutually agreed to terminate his MLS contract.

=== OKC Energy ===
In August 2018, Bustos joined the United Soccer League's OKC Energy FC.

=== Valour FC ===
On May 7, 2019, Bustos signed for his hometown club, Canadian Premier League side Valour FC.

=== Pacific FC ===
On January 30, 2020, Bustos signed with Pacific FC. He made his debut on August 15 against the HFX Wanderers, netting a goal in a 2–2 draw. In his final match of 2020, Bustos scored twice and assisted twice in the first half to finish the season with five goals and three assists. Bustos continued with Pacific for the 2021 Canadian Premier League, and on July 10 he scored two goals against York United FC, making him the Canadian Premier League's all-time leading goalscorer, with 15 goals in three years between Valour and Pacific. The same year, he suffered a knee injury while playing for the club.

After the conclusion of the 2022 season, Bustos joined Major League Soccer side Toronto FC on trial. In January 2023, Pacific announced Bustos would be departing the club, following the expiration of his contract.

=== Värnamo ===
On January 14, 2023, Bustos officially joined Swedish club Värnamo on a free transfer, signing a two-year contract with the club. He made his Allsvenskan debut on April 2, starting in a 0–1 away win against IFK Göteborg. He then scored his first goal for the club on April 29, finding the net in a 3–1 league defeat to Häcken.

=== Return to Pacific FC ===
In January 2025, Bustos returned to his former club Pacific FC on a two-year contract through 2026.

== International career ==
=== Youth ===
Bustos has represented Canada at youth level and was a part of the Canadian team at the 2013 FIFA U-17 World Cup. He courted controversy in July 2014 when he accepted a call-up from the Chile U-20 squad for a training camp prior to an invitational tournament in the United States. This prompted a negative reaction from Canadian soccer media circles. Bustos would state in an interview that he was not spurning Canada, and simply "keeping his options open." He was cut from the final Chile squad, however. Bustos was subsequently left off the Canadian U-20 team that went to 2014 Milk Cup the following month, but returned to the team for a series of friendlies in November, where he scored a goal for Canada against Russia's U-21 side. In January 2015 Bustos made the Canadian team for the 2015 CONCACAF U-20 Championship.

=== Senior ===
Bustos received his first call up to the Canadian senior team for a friendly against Ghana on October 2, 2015. Bustos made his debut for the senior side on October 13 as a substitute, replacing fellow debutante Charlie Trafford.

== Style of play ==
Bustos plays as a winger. Left-footed, he is known for his dribbling ability.

== Personal life ==
Bustos has a Chilean father and an Italian mother. He is the brother of Chile international Melissa Bustos.

== Career statistics ==
As of October 24, 2025

Appearances and goals by club, season and competition
| Club | Season | League | | | National cup (Note: Includes the Canadian Championship and Copa MX) | | Continental (Note: Includes the CONCACAF Champions League) | | Other (Note: Includes the USL Cup Playoffs and the Ascenso MX Liguilla) | | Total | |
| Club | Season | Division | Apps | Goals | Apps | Goals | Apps | Goals | Apps | Goals | Apps | Goals |
|---|---|---|---|---|---|---|---|---|---|---|---|---|
| Vancouver Whitecaps FC U-23 | 2014 | USL PDL | 7 | 4 | – | | – | | 0 | 0 | 7 | 4 |
| Vancouver Whitecaps FC | 2014 | MLS | 0 | 0 | 1 | 0 | – | | 0 | 0 | 1 | 0 |
| Vancouver Whitecaps FC | 2015 | MLS | 1 | 0 | 0 | 0 | 4 | 0 | 0 | 0 | 5 | 0 |
| Vancouver Whitecaps FC | 2016 | MLS | 3 | 0 | 1 | 0 | 1 | 0 | 0 | 0 | 5 | 0 |
| Vancouver Whitecaps FC | 2017 | MLS | 0 | 0 | 2 | 0 | 0 | 0 | 0 | 0 | 2 | 0 |
| Vancouver Whitecaps FC | Total | | 4 | 0 | 4 | 0 | 5 | 0 | 0 | 0 | 13 | 0 |
| Whitecaps FC 2 (loan) | 2015 | USL | 17 | 7 | – | | – | | 0 | 0 | 17 | 7 |
| Whitecaps FC 2 (loan) | 2016 | USL | 19 | 7 | – | | – | | 2 | 0 | 21 | 7 |
| Whitecaps FC 2 (loan) | 2017 | USL | 21 | 8 | – | | – | | 0 | 0 | 21 | 8 |
| Whitecaps FC 2 (loan) | Total | | 57 | 22 | 0 | 0 | 0 | 0 | 2 | 0 | 59 | 22 |
| Zacatepec (loan) | 2017–18 | Ascenso MX | 5 | 0 | 2 | 1 | – | | 1 | 0 | 8 | 1 |
| Zacatepec (loan) | 2018–19 | Ascenso MX | 0 | 0 | 1 | 0 | – | | 0 | 0 | 1 | 0 |
| Zacatepec (loan) | Total | | 5 | 0 | 3 | 1 | 0 | 0 | 1 | 0 | 9 | 1 |
| OKC Energy | 2018 | USL Championship | 9 | 1 | 0 | 0 | – | | 0 | 0 | 9 | 1 |
| OKC Energy | 2019 | USL Championship | 7 | 0 | 0 | 0 | – | | 0 | 0 | 7 | 0 |
| OKC Energy | Total | | 16 | 1 | 0 | 0 | 0 | 0 | 0 | 0 | 16 | 1 |
| Valour FC | 2019 | Canadian Premier League | 25 | 7 | 2 | 1 | – | | 0 | 0 | 27 | 8 |
| Pacific FC | 2020 | Canadian Premier League | 10 | 5 | 0 | 0 | – | | 0 | 0 | 10 | 5 |
| Pacific FC | 2021 | Canadian Premier League | 17 | 7 | 1 | 0 | – | | 0 | 0 | 18 | 7 |
| Pacific FC | 2022 | Canadian Premier League | 28 | 2 | 1 | 0 | 4 | 1 | 2 | 0 | 35 | 4 |
| Pacific FC | Total | | 55 | 14 | 2 | 0 | 4 | 1 | 2 | 0 | 63 | 15 |
| Värnamo | 2023 | Allsvenskan | 18 | 3 | 1 | 0 | – | | 0 | 0 | 19 | 3 |
| Värnamo | 2024 | Allsvenskan | 19 | 0 | 3 | 1 | – | | 2 | 0 | 24 | 1 |
| Värnamo | Total | | 37 | 3 | 4 | 1 | 0 | 0 | 2 | 0 | 43 | 3 |
| Pacific FC | 2025 | Canadian Premier League | 26 | 2 | 1 | 0 | – | | – | | 27 | 2 |
| Career total | | | 232 | 53 | 16 | 3 | 9 | 1 | 7 | 0 | 264 | 57 |

== Honours ==
Pacific FC

- Canadian Premier League: 2021
