= Emanuel Montejano =

Mexican footballer (born 2001)

Personal information
- Full name: Emanuel Montejano Arroyo
- Date of birth: 12 July 2001 (age 25)
- Place of birth: Mexico City, Mexico
- Height: 1.77 m (5 ft 9 1/2 in)
- Position: Forward

Team information
- Current team: Irapuato
- Number: 7

Youth career
- 2014–2021: UNAM

Senior career*
Years	Team	Apps	(Gls)
2020–2023	UNAM	12	(1)
2021	→ Pumas Tabasco (loan)	18	(4)
2024	Celaya	12	(0)
2025	Pacific FC	16	(1)
2026–	Irapuato	1	(0)

International career
2018	Mexico U18	1	(0)
- * Club domestic league appearances and goals as of 6 September 2026

Emanuel Montejano Arroyo (born 12 July 2001) is a Mexican professional footballer who plays as a forward for Irapuato.

== Club career ==
Montejano made his professional debut with Pumas UNAM on January 17, 2020, in win against Mazatlán where he assisted and scored a goal.

On 5 March 2025, Montejano signed a one-year contract with an option for a further year with Canadian Premier League side Pacific FC.

== Career statistics ==
=== Club ===
As of match played 30 July 2023

Club	Season	League			Cup		Continental		Other		Total	
Club	Season	Division	Apps	Goals	Apps	Goals	Apps	Goals	Apps	Goals	Apps	Goals
UNAM	2019–20	Liga MX	—		2	0	—		—		2	0
UNAM	2020–21	Liga MX	6	1	—		—		1 (Note: Appearances in Leagues Cup)	0	7	1
UNAM	2021–22	Liga MX	6	0	—		—		—		6	0
UNAM	2023–24	Liga MX	0	0	—		—		1	1	1	1
UNAM	Total		12	1	2	0	0	0	2	1	16	2
Pumas Tabasco (loan)	2020–21	Liga de Expansión MX	3	1	—		—		—		3	1
Pumas Tabasco (loan)	2021–22	Liga de Expansión MX	7	2	—		—		—		7	2
Pumas Tabasco (loan)	2022–23	Liga de Expansión MX	8	1	—		—		—		8	1
Pumas Tabasco (loan)	Total		18	4	—		—		—		18	4
Career total			30	5	2	0	0	0	2	1	34	6
