= Lukas Browning Lagerfeldt =

Irish footballer (born 1999)

Personal information
- Full name: Lukas Edward Browning Lagerfeldt
- Date of birth: 6 January 1999 (age 27)
- Place of birth: Drogheda, Republic of Ireland
- Height: 1.90 m (6 ft 3 in)
- Position: Midfielder

Team information
- Current team: Pacific FC
- Number: 6

Youth career
- 2016–2017: IF Brommapojkarna
- 2017–2020: FC Twente

Senior career*
Years	Team	Apps	(Gls)
2020–2021	Örgryte IS	54	(1)
2022	Dalkurd FF	21	(1)
2023	Sligo Rovers	27	(1)
2024	Gefle	25	(2)
2025–	Pacific FC	28	(0)

International career^{‡}
2015–2016	Republic of Ireland U17	3	(0)
2017–2018	Sweden U19	4	(0)
- * Club domestic league appearances and goals as of 27 October 2026 ‡ National team caps and goals as of 7 April 2025

Lukas Edward Browning Lagerfeldt (born 6 January 1999) is an Irish footballer who plays as a midfielder for Canadian club Pacific FC.

== Early life ==
Born in the Republic of Ireland, Browning Lagerfeldt grew up in Stockholm, Sweden. Briefly relocating back to Ireland to attend school, Lukas returned to Sweden after one school year. He started playing football at the age of six.

== Youth career ==
As a youth player, Browning Lagerfeldt was regarded as a Swedish prospect and joined the youth academy of Dutch side FC Twente.

== Senior club career ==
Browning Lagerfeldt started his senior career with Swedish side Örgryte. In 2023, he signed for Irish side Sligo Rovers. He was released at the end of the season after scoring 1 goal in 27 league appearances with the club.

== International career ==
Browning Lagerfeldt has represented Sweden at youth international level.

== Style of play ==
Browning Lagerfeldt mainly operates as a midfielder and is known for his strength and passing ability.

== Personal life ==
Browning's father Brian who was an influential businessman in town of Drogheda died in 2024 after a illness. Browning Lagerfeldt can speak Swedish, Dutch, and English and has a sister.
