= Sami Keshavarz =

Canadian soccer player (born 2006)

Personal information
- Date of birth: August 14, 2006 (age 20)
- Place of birth: Saanich, British Columbia, Canada
- Height: 1.70 m (5 ft 7 in)
- Position: Midfielder

Team information
- Current team: Pacific FC
- Number: 34

Youth career
- Saanich Fusion FC
- Vancouver Island Wave

Senior career*
Years	Team	Apps	(Gls)
2023–	Pacific FC	44	(1)
- * Club domestic league appearances and goals as of October 27, 2026

Sami Keshavarz, previously known as Sami Marvasti, (born August 14, 2006) is a Canadian soccer player who plays for Pacific FC in the Canadian Premier League.

== Early life ==
Keshavarz played youth soccer with Saanich Fusion FC, before later joining the Vancouver Island Wave. In late 2023, he and some of his teammates from the VI Wave were invited to train with the Canadian women's national team to help in their preparation ahead of a friendly against Australia.

== Club career ==
In April 2023, he signed a developmental contract with Pacific FC of the Canadian Premier League. In April 2024, he signed another developmental contract with the club. He made his professional debut on June 1, 2024 against Cavalry FC in a substitute appearance, and made his first professional start on September 7, 2024 against the HFX Wanderers. In December 2024, he signed a professional contract through 2026 with an option for 2027 with the club. He scored his first professional goal on October 5, 2025, in a 3-3 draw against Cavalry FC.

== Personal life ==
Keshavarz's older brother Takin plays soccer for the University of Victoria Vikes and the two faced off against each other in an exhibition match while Keshavarz played with professional side Pacific FC.

== Career statistics ==
As of October 23, 2025

Club	Season	League			Playoffs		Domestic Cup		Other		Total	
Club	Season	Division	Apps	Goals	Apps	Goals	Apps	Goals	Apps	Goals	Apps	Goals
Pacific FC	2023	Canadian Premier League	0	0	0	0	0	0	–		0	0
Pacific FC	2024	Canadian Premier League	8	0	0	0	0	0	–		8	0
Pacific FC	2024	Canadian Premier League	24	1	–		1	0	–		25	1
Pacific FC	Total		32	1	0	0	1	0	0	0	33	1
Career total			32	1	0	0	1	0	0	0	33	1
