= Roshawn Juhmi =

Canadian soccer player (born 2001)

Personal information
- Full name: Roshawn Kadeem Delahaye Juhmi
- Date of birth: July 24, 2001 (age 25)
- Place of birth: Toronto, Ontario, Canada
- Height: 1.78 m (5 ft 10 in)
- Position: Midfielder

Team information
- Current team: Pacific FC
- Number: 66

Youth career
- 2019–2020: Marítimo

Senior career*
| Years | Team | Apps | (Gls) |
| 2020–2021 | Gafanha | | |
| 2021 | Alba | | |
| 2021–2022 | Vista Alegra | 20 | (1) |
| 2022–2023 | Salgueiros B | 21 | (4) |
| 2023 | Águeda | 9 | (1) |
| 2024 | Arronches e Benfica | 6 | (1) |
| 2024–2025 | Avanca | 19 | (0) |
| 2025 | Vista Alegra | 11 | (0) |
| 2025– | Pacific FC | 31 | (0) |
- * Club domestic league appearances and goals as of October 24, 2026

Roshawn Kadeem Delahaye Juhmi (born July 24, 2001) is a Canadian professional soccer player who plays for Pacific FC in the Canadian Premier League.

== Career ==
Juhmi began his senior career playing in the non-professional divisions in Portugal for six years with several different clubs.

In August 2025, he signed with Canadian Premier League club Pacific FC for the remainder of 2025, with an option for 2026. In January 2026, he signed an extension for the 2026 season, with an option for 2027.
