= James Merriman (soccer) =

Canadian soccer coach, born 1985

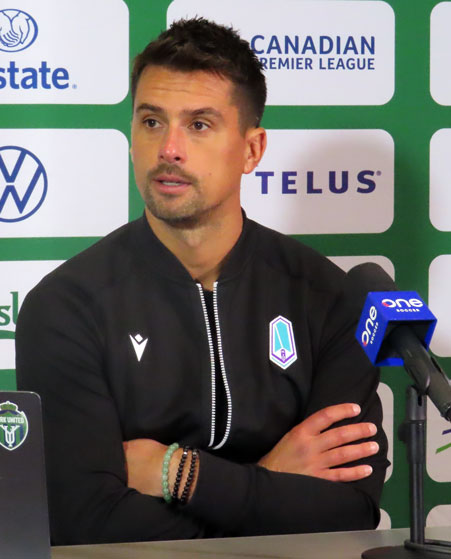
- Merriman in 2025

Personal information
- Date of birth: June 9, 1985 (age 41)
- Place of birth: Nanaimo, British Columbia, Canada

College career
Years	Team	Apps	(Gls)
2003–2006	Denver Pioneers	≥54	(≥5)

Senior career*
Years	Team	Apps	(Gls)
2006	Boulder Rapids Reserve	9	(0)
2008–2009	Colorado Lightning (indoor)	4	(4)
2010	Victoria Highlanders FC	8	(0)

Managerial career
- 2009–2011: VIU Mariners (assistant)
- 2012–2013: Simon Fraser athletics (assistant)
- 2019–2021: Pacific FC (assistant)
- 2022–2026: Pacific FC
- * Club domestic league appearances and goals

James Merriman is a Canadian soccer coach and former player. He most recently served as the head coach of Pacific FC in the Canadian Premier League.

== Playing career ==
Merriman played NCAA Division I soccer with the University of Denver Pioneers. His senior career included stints with Boulder Rapids Reserve, Victoria Highlanders FC, and Colorado Lightning.

== Coaching career ==
=== Early career ===
Merriman served as assistant coach of Vancouver Island University under his father Bill Merriman from 2009 to 2011 and at Simon Fraser University from 2012 to 2013. He also coached in various roles with the Whitecaps FC Academy.

=== Pacific FC ===
James Merriman was hired as an assistant coach under Michael Silberbauer for the inaugural season of Pacific FC and the Canadian Premier League. That 2019 season was disappointing for Pacific, and Silberbauer was fired before Pacific's final game of the year. This gave Merriman the opportunity to take the reins as interim manager, and he managed Pacific to a 2–0 victory over Valour FC to close out the season in fifth place.

Ahead of the 2020 season, Pacific hired Pa-Modou Kah as the new head coach and retained Merriman as his assistant. The season saw improvement for Pacific as the club finished the CPL season in fourth.

The 2021 season was even better as Pacific managed to win the 2021 Canadian Premier League Final to become league champions and also went on an impressive run in the Canadian Championship. Following the season, Kah departed the club to manage North Texas SC and Merriman was named as Pacific's new head coach.

In his first three seasons as head coach, Pacific qualified for the CPL playoffs each year and reached the Canadian Championship semifinals in 2023 and 2024. Following a disappointing second-to-last place finish in 2025 and an 0–1–5 start to 2026, Pacific FC and Merriman parted ways through mutual termination.
