= Ahmad Mansour =

Canadian soccer player (born 2000)

Personal information
- Full name: Ahmad Ali Mansour
- Date of birth: November 3, 2000 (age 26)
- Place of birth: Burlington, Ontario, Canada
- Height: 1.88 m (6 ft 2 in)
- Position: Defender

College career
Years	Team	Apps	(Gls)
2018–2019	Waterloo Warriors	23	(2)
2022	McMaster Marauders	14	(1)

Senior career*
Years	Team	Apps	(Gls)
2021	Ansar	0	(0)
2021	Waterloo United		
2022–2023	Hamilton United	20	(2)
2023–2024	Nejmeh	2	(0)
2024	Blue Devils FC	6	(0)
2024–2025	Sur	9	(0)
2025	Pacific FC	2	(0)
2026	Sloboda Tuzla	10	(1)
- * Club domestic league appearances and goals as of June 12, 2026

Ahmad Ali Mansour (born November 3, 2000) is a Canadian professional soccer player.

== University career ==
Mansour began his collegiate career in 2018 at the University of Waterloo, playing for the varsity soccer team. In 2022, he began attending McMaster University, also playing for their soccer team, where he was named an OUA Second Team All-Star at the end of the season.

== Club career ==
In 2021, Mansour signed with Waterloo United for the League1 Ontario Summer Championship as one of the club's inaugural signings. Later that year, he joined Lebanese Premier League club Ansar, but returned to Canada shortly after participating in the Lebanese Elite Cup, citing financial instability in Lebanon.

He played for Hamilton United in League1 Ontario during the 2022 and 2023 seasons. In July 2023, he signed with Nejmeh in the Lebanese Premier League, resolving prior contractual obligations with Ansar before officially joining the club in August.

In 2024, Mansour joined Blue Devils FC in League1 Ontario, before signing with Oman Professional League side Sur later that year. In August 2025, he signed with Pacific FC of the Canadian Premier League for the remainder of the season, with an option for 2026. At the end of the season, the club declined his option for 2026.

In February 2026, he signed with First League of the Federation of Bosnia and Herzegovina club Sloboda Tuzla.

== Personal life ==
Mansour is of Lebanese descent.
