= Aly Ndom =

French footballer (born 1996)

Personal information
- Date of birth: 30 May 1996 (age 30)
- Place of birth: Pontoise, France
- Height: 1.86 m (6 ft 1 in)
- Position: Defensive midfielder

Team information
- Current team: Visakha

Youth career
- AS Saint-Ouen-l'Aumône
- State Reims

Senior career*
Years	Team	Apps	(Gls)
2014–2018	Stade Reims B	31+	(3+)
2016–2019	Stade Reims	64	(2)
2019	→ Caen B (loan)	1	(0)
2019	→ Caen (loan)	1	(0)
2019–2021	Auxerre B	3	(1)
2019–2022	Auxerre	47	(2)
2022–2023	Chindia Târgoviște		
2023	Viterbese		
2023	IFK Mariehamn	23	(0)
2024–2025	Pacific FC	30	(5)
2026	Persijap Jepara	11	(0)
2026–	Visakha	0	(0)
- * Club domestic league appearances and goals as of July 14, 2026

Aly Ndom (born 30 May 1996) is a French professional footballer who plays as a defensive midfielder for Visakha in the Cambodian Premier League.

== Early life ==
Ndom played youth football with AS Saint-Ouen-l'Aumône. He joined the youth system of State Reims in 2012.

== Club career ==
In 2014, Ndom began playing at the senior level with Stade Reims B. Ndom made his debut with the Reims first team in Ligue 2 on 20 February 2016 in the 4-1 match against Paris Saint-Germain. Ndom helped Reims win the 2017–18 Ligue 2, helping promote them to the Ligue 1 for the 2018–19 season.

In January 2019, he was loaned to fellow Ligue 1 side Caen for the remainder of the season, with Caen holding a purchase option, upon the end of the loan. After suffering an injury soon after his arrival in a reserve match, he made his debut for the Caen first team on 31 March 2019 against Monaco. After his debut, he subsequently re-injured his knee, ending his time with the club with just a sole first-team appearance.

In July 2019, he signed with Ligue 2 club Auxerre.

In September 2022, Ndom signed with Romanian club Chindia Târgoviște in Liga I. In mid-January 2023, after appearing in one league match and two cup matches, he agreed to terminate his contract with the club by mutual consent.

In January 2023, he signed with Viterbese in the Italian third-tier Serie C. However, a month later, on 1 February 2023, Ndom's contract with Viterbese was terminated by mutual consent.

On 6 February 2023, he signed with Finnish Veikkausliiga club IFK Mariehamn. He was named to the league's Team of the Month for October.

On 8 February 2024, Ndom signed a two-year contract with Canadian Premier League club Pacific FC. On 17 May, he suffered an Achilles tendon rupture that would cause him to miss the remainder of the 2024 season. During his seven matches across all competitions in 2024, Pacific did not concede a single goal while Ndom was on the pitch. He returned to play in 2025, playing a prominent role, scoring six goals across all competitions.

In late December 2025, he signed with Indonesian Super League club Persijap Jepara for 2026.

In July 2026, he signed with Visakha in the Cambodian Premier League.

== Personal life ==
Born in France, Ndom is of Senegalese descent.

== Career statistics ==
As of match played 23 May 2026

Appearances and goals by club, season and competition
Club	Season	League			National Cup		League Cup		Other		Total	
Club	Season	Division	Apps	Goals	Apps	Goals	Apps	Goals	Apps	Goals	Apps	Goals
Stade Reims B	2013–14	CFA 2	5	0	—		—		—		5	0
Stade Reims B	2014–15	Régional 1	?	?	—		—		—		?	?
Stade Reims B	2015–16	CFA 2	13	1	—		—		—		13	1
Stade Reims B	2016–17	CFA	10	2	—		—		—		10	2
Stade Reims B	2017–18	National 2	1	0	—		—		—		1	0
Stade Reims B	2018–19	National 2	2	0	—		—		—		2	0
Stade Reims B	Total		31	3	—		—		—		31	3
Stade Reims	2015–16	Ligue 1	8	0	0	0	0	0	—		8	0
Stade Reims	2016–17	Ligue 2	19	0	1	0	1	0	—		21	0
Stade Reims	2017–18	Ligue 2	26	2	1	1	2	0	—		29	3
Stade Reims	2018–19	Ligue 1	11	0	0	0	1	0	—		12	0
Stade Reims	Total		64	2	2	1	4	0	—		70	3
Caen B (loan)	2018–19	National 3	1	0	—		—		—		1	0
Caen (loan)	2018–19	Ligue 1	1	0	0	0	0	0	—		1	0
Auxerre B	2019–20	National 3	1	1	—		—		—		1	1
Auxerre B	2021–22	National 3	2	0	—		—		—		2	0
Auxerre B	Total		3	1	0	0	0	0	0	0	3	1
Auxerre	2019–20	Ligue 2	8	1	0	0	0	0	—		8	1
Auxerre	2020–21	Ligue 2	19	0	1	0	0	0	—		20	0
Auxerre	2021–22	Ligue 2	20	1	3	0	0	0	0	0	23	1
Auxerre	Total		47	2	4	0	0	0	0	0	51	2
Chindia Târgoviște	2022–23	Liga I	1	0	2	0	—		—		3	0
Viterbese	2022–23	Serie C	0	0	0	0	—		—		0	0
IFK Mariehamn	2023	Veikkausliiga	21	0	2	0	2	0	2	0	27	0
Pacific FC	2024	Canadian Premier League	6	0	1	0	—		0	0	7	0
Pacific FC	2025	Canadian Premier League	24	5	1	1	—		—		25	6
Pacific FC	Total		30	5	2	1	0	0	0	0	32	6
Persijap Jepara	2025–26	Super League	11	0	0	0	0	0	0	0	11	0
Career total			210	13	12	2	6	0	2	0	230	15

== Honours ==
Reims

- Ligue 2: 2017–18
