= Diego Konincks =

Dutch footballer (born 2000)

Personal information
- Full name: Diego Juan Konincks
- Date of birth: 30 November 2000 (age 25)
- Place of birth: Montfoort, Netherlands
- Height: 6 ft 2 in (1.88 m)
- Position: Defender

Team information
- Current team: Pacific FC

Youth career
- 2005–2019: Montvoort SV '19

College career
Years	Team	Apps	(Gls)
2019	Midland Warriors	20	(3)
2020–2022	Campbell Fighting Camels	50	(5)
2023	Saint Louis Billikens	17	(4)

Senior career*
Years	Team	Apps	(Gls)
2021	FC Florida U23	4	(1)
2024–2025	Chicago Fire FC II	41	(3)
2024–2025	→ Chicago Fire FC (loan)	0	(0)
2025	→ Valour FC (loan)	9	(2)
2026–	Pacific FC	25	(3)
- * Club domestic league appearances and goals as of October 27, 2026

Diego Juan Konincks (born 30 November 2000) is a Dutch footballer who plays for Pacific FC in the Canadian Premier League.

== Early life ==
Konincks began playing youth football at age four with Montvoort SV '19, with whom he played with for 14 years.

== College career ==
In 2019, Konincks moved to the United States, where he began attending Midland University to play for the men's soccer team, which played in the NAIA. On September 30, 2019, he scored his first collegiate goal in a 2–0 victory over the Mount Marty Lancers. At the end of the season, he was named to the All-Great Plains Athletic Conference Second Team.

In 2020, he transferred to Campbell University to play for their men's soccer team in NCAA Division I. Ahead of the season, he was named vice-captain. In his first season, he was named to the All-Big South Conference First Team, the All-Tournament Team and the Big South Presidential Honor Roll. In 2021, he was named to the All-Big South First Team, the big South All-Academic Team and theBig South Presidential Honor Roll. In 2022, he was named to the All-Big South First Team, the Big South All-Academic team, an Academic All-District.

In 2023, he began attending Saint Louis University, joining their men's soccer team. In October 2023, he was named the Atlantic 10 Conference Defensive Player of the Week. At the end of the season, he was named the Atlantic 10 Defensive Player of the Year, named to the All-Atlantic 10 First Team, and the Atlantic 10 All-Academic Team. He was also named to the All-Region Second Team, and a Third Team Academic All-America selection.

== Club career ==
In 2021, Konincks played with FC Florida U23 in USL League Two.

In March 2024, Konincks signed a one-year contract with Chicago Fire FC II in MLS Next Pro. On 10 April 2024, he scored his first goal in a 2–0 victory over Crown Legacy FC. During the 2024 season, he signed multiple short-term loans with the Chicago Fire FC first team. He served as team captain for Chicago Fire II during the 2025 season. In 2025, he signed an additional two short-term loans with the first team. In August 2025, he was loaned to Canadian Premier League club Valour FC for the remainder of the 2025 season.

In December 2025, he signed a two-year contract with Pacific FC in the Canadian Premier League. He made his debut on April 5, 2026, against Cavalry FC.
