= Mattias Vales =

Canadian soccer player (born 2008)

Personal information
- Date of birth: February 29, 2008 (age 18)
- Height: 1.70 m (5 ft 7 in)
- Position: Midfielder

Team information
- Current team: Pacific FC
- Number: 37

Youth career
- Vancouver Island Wave

Senior career*
Years	Team	Apps	(Gls)
2025–	Pacific FC	25	(1)
2026–	→ TSS FC Rovers (loan)	2	(0)
- * Club domestic league appearances and goals as of October 27, 2026

Mattias Vales (born February 29, 2008) is a Canadian soccer midfielder for Pacific FC of the Canadian Premier League.

== Career ==
He played soccer for the Juan De Fuca and Gorge Soccer Associations in Greater Victoria, British Columbia before joining St. John's Academy and the Vancouver Isle Wave. He was signed by Pacific FC in June 2024.

On May 6, 2025, he made his professional for Pacific FC against Vancouver FC in a Canadian Championship match. He made his Canadian Premier League debut on May 17, 2025, against Calvary FC.
