= Pacific FC =

Canadian professional soccer club based in Langford, British Columbia

Pacific
- Nickname: The Tridents
- Short name: PFC
- Founded: June 1, 2018; 8 years ago
- Stadium: Starlight Stadium; Langford, British Columbia
- Capacity: 6,000
- Owner: SixFive Sports & Entertainment
- President: Josh Simpson
- Managing director: Paul Beirne
- Coach: Terry Dunfield
- League: Canadian Premier League
- 2026: Regular season: 8th Playoffs: Did not qualify
- Website: pacificfc.canpl.ca
Home colours	Away colours

Pacific Football Club is a Canadian professional soccer club based in Greater Victoria, British Columbia. The club competes in the Canadian Premier League (CPL), playing home matches at Starlight Stadium located in Langford.

Pacific FC were the second club to win a CPL title which they did in 2021. As a result of the win, they qualified for and played in the 2022 CONCACAF League.

== History ==
On May 5, 2018, "Port City FC" was one of four groups accepted by the Canadian Soccer Association for professional club membership, along with groups that would become Cavalry FC, HFX Wanderers, and York9. Port City was the only one of the four that was not identified with a specific city, and represented an as-of-yet undetermined location in British Columbia. The group was expected to launch a team in either Greater Victoria or Surrey, British Columbia. Former professional player Rob Friend, who grew up in British Columbia, was pictured as a representative of the region. On June 1, the Canadian Premier League granted the Port City ownership group a club on Vancouver Island.

Pacific FC was officially unveiled on July 20 as the seventh team to join the Canadian Premier League. As well as confirming its place in the league for the 2019 launch season, the club also revealed its crest, colours and branding. Former Denmark international Michael Silberbauer was announced as the first head coach on August 20.

They played their first competitive game on April 28, 2019, defeating visitors HFX Wanderers 1–0 with Hendrik Starostzik scoring the only goal and Mark Village keeping a clean sheet. The club parted ways with Silberbauer on October 18, 2019, and announced then-assistant coach James Merriman as interim head coach. Former Norway international Pa-Modou Kah was named permanent head coach before the 2020 season.

On August 26, 2021, they were matched against Major League Soccer opposition for the first time, being drawn against provincial opponents Vancouver Whitecaps FC in the quarterfinals of the Canadian Championship. Although underdogs, they defeated the Whitecaps 4–3, becoming the second CPL club to eliminate an MLS club in the competition.

On December 5, Pacific FC won its first Canadian Premier League title after defeating defending champions Forge FC 1–0 in the 2021 CPL Final at Tim Hortons Field. In doing so they became the second team to have been crowned Canadian Premier League champions. Head coach Pa-Modou Kah resigned during the offseason and was replaced by assistant coach James Merriman.

In 2022, Pacific participated in CONCACAF League for the first time. They won their preliminary round matchup but were eliminated in the round of 16 by Herediano of Costa Rica. In the CPL, Pacific recorded their highest point total to date (46 points) but were eliminated in the semifinals of the league playoffs.

In September 2025, SixFive Sports & Entertainment – owners of Pacific FC – announced that they were exploring a sale of the team. On May 26, 2026, Pacific parted ways with James Merriman following a 17-match winless streak. Merriman had served as head coach since 2022 and the been with the club since the inaugural 2019 season. The winless streak continued into the summer, reaching 27 matches and more than 365 days by August 15, 2026.

== Stadium ==
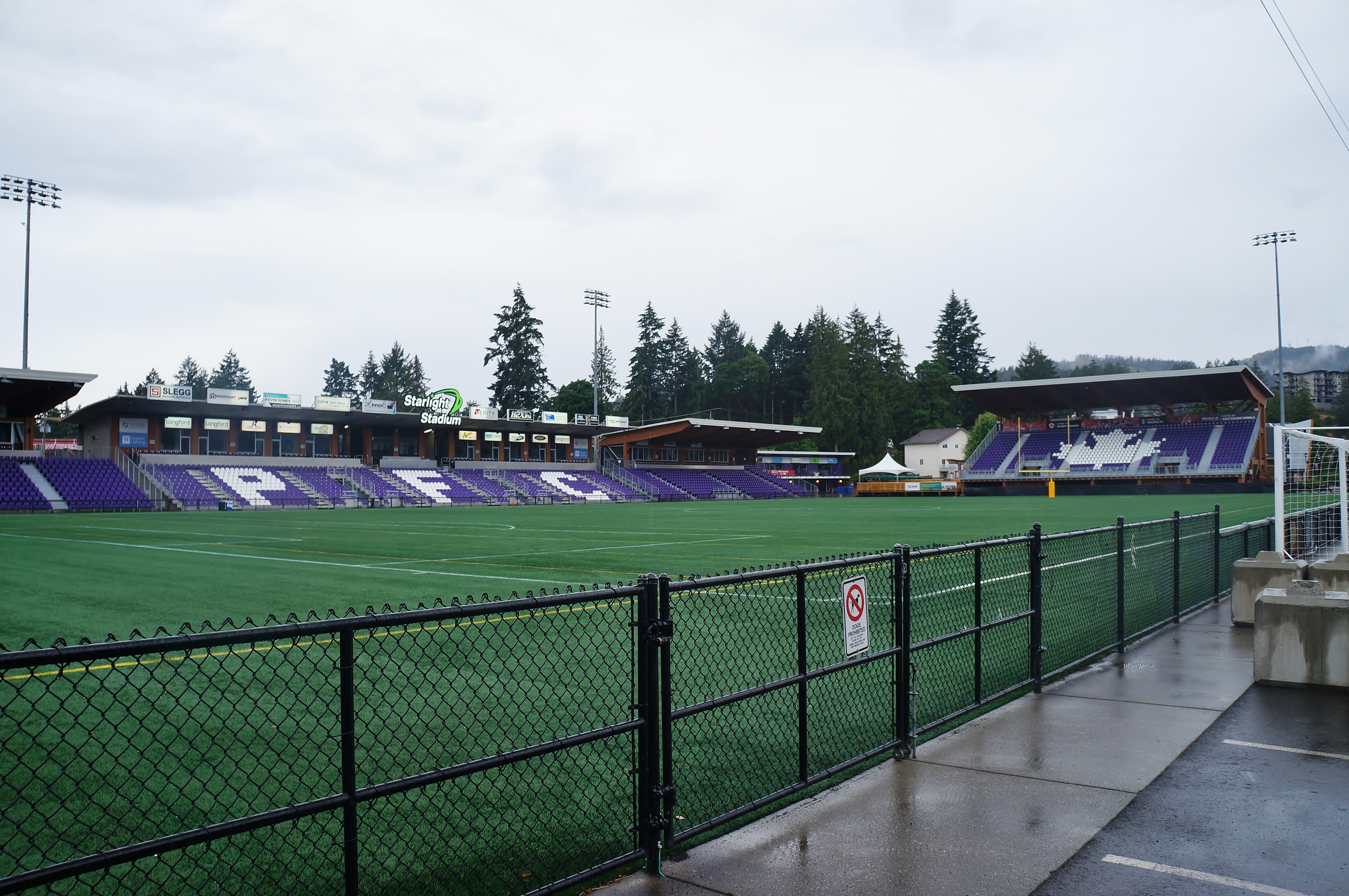
Starlight Stadium is a stadium in Langford, British Columbia that is used for home games by Pacific FC.

The club plays its home games at Starlight Stadium. The city of Langford planned to increase the capacity from 1,718 to 8,000, but a utility pole located on the north side of the stadium has prevented any upgrades on that side. By extending the existing south stand and adding seating behind both goals as well as new standing room on the north side, the capacity was increased to 6,200 for the 2019 season.

== Crest and colours ==
The club's branding is designed to represent Vancouver Island. The team's crest is the shape of a Douglas fir, a tree native to Vancouver Island, split into two segments, with the right side forming the shape of the island. The tree is bordered by the ocean and includes a single chevron to represent a wave of the ocean and a 'V' that can stand for Victoria, victory and Vancouver Island.

The secondary logo is a roundel with a trident, meant to represent the strength and courage of the island, as well as the weather attributed to the Pacific Ocean. The logo also includes the motto of the coat of arms of the city of Victoria, which is the Latin phrase Semper Liber (lit. 'Forever Free').

The official club colours are purple, teal, and white (branded by the club as "starfish purple", "lagoon blue", and "lighthouse white"). These colours symbolize the native Pisaster ochraceus sea star, the Pacific Ocean, and the region's lighthouses.

=== Kit history ===
Home and away kits.

- Home

2019	2020	2021	2022	2023	2024	2025	2026

- Away

2019	2020–21	2022	2023	2024	2025	2026

=== Kit suppliers and sponsors ===
Period	Kit manufacturer	Chest sponsor	Sleeve sponsor
2019–2022	Macron	Volkswagen	None
2023–2024	Macron	Telus	CIBC
2025	Macron	Telus	None
2026–present	Hummel	Telus	Moneris

== Club culture ==
=== Supporters ===
The first supporters group to show support for a Vancouver Island team to join the Canadian Premier League was the Lake Side Buoys, an existing group who followed the Victoria Highlanders of USL League Two. A second supporters group, called Torcida Oranizada Pacific (TOP) has also emerged.

=== Rivalries ===
==== Vancouver FC ====
Pacific first battled Vancouver FC during the opening match day of the 2023 season at Starlight Stadium with Pacific winning the contest 1–0 with a late winner by Manny Aparicio during the second meeting the teams met at Willoughby Community Park Stadium which lead to a thrilling 6–3 victory with the winner scored by Easton Ongaro.

==== Cavalry FC ====
Pacific FC met Cavalry FC for the first time in the Canadian Premier League in the final fixture of the 2019 Spring season, winning 3–1 at Westhills Stadium in an intense match which saw three players sent-off. Pacific FC and Cavalry FC's rivalry intensified during the 2021 season where they met eight times across three Canadian competitions (Canadian Premier League, CPL Playoffs, and the Canadian Championship). This rivalry is also fueled by a pre-existing cultural rivalry between each team's respective province: Alberta and British Columbia.

== Honours ==
Pacific FC honours
Type	Competition	Titles	Seasons
Domestic	Canadian Premier League	1	2021

Best results in other competitions
Competition	Result	Season
Canadian Championship	Semi-finals	2021, 2023, 2024
CONCACAF League	Round of 16	2022

== Players and staff ==
=== Roster ===
As of September 11, 2026

Note: Flags indicate national team as defined under FIFA eligibility rules; some limited exceptions apply. Players may hold more than one non-FIFA nationality.

No.	Pos.	Nation	Player
1	GK	CAN	Eleias Himaras
2	DF	VIN	Tristan Marshall
4	DF	NED	Diego Konincks
5	DF	COL	Juan Quintana
6	MF	SWE	Lukas Browning-Lagerfeldt
7	DF	CAN	Kadin Chung
8	MF	CAN	Aidan Daniels
9	FW	MEX	Alejandro Díaz
10	FW	CAN	Marco Bustos
11	FW	WAL	Josh Heard (captain)
12	DF	CAN	Josh Belluz
15	DF	CAN	Christian Greco-Taylor

No.	Pos.	Nation	Player
16	MF	AUS	Taras Gomulka
18	MF	CAN	Max Piepgrass
21	MF	CAN	Matteo Schiavoni
27	FW	CAN	Ronan Kratt
34	MF	CAN	Sami Keshavarz
37	MF	CAN	Mattias Vales
38	FW	CAN	Dylan De Melo
44	MF	CAN	Marley Edwards
55	GK	CAN	Sean Melvin
64	FW	CIV	Yann Toualy
66	MF	CAN	Roshawn Juhmi
99	FW	CAN	Shaan Hundal

=== Staff ===
As of November 9, 2026

Executive
President	(Canada) Josh Simpson
Chief executive officer	(Canada) Rob Friend
Chairman	(Canada) Dean Shillington
Managing Director	(Canada) Rob Jenkins
Coaching staff
Head coach	(Canada) Terry Dunfield
Assistant coach / youth coach	(Canada) Chris Merriman
Goalkeeper coach	(Canada) Trevor Stiles

=== Head coaches ===
As of October 27, 2026

Coach	Nation	Tenure	Record				
Coach	Nation	Tenure	G	W	D	L	Win %
Michael Silberbauer	Denmark	August 20, 2018 – October 18, 2019	29	7	7	15	24.14
James Merriman (interim)	Canada	October 18, 2019 – January 14, 2020	1	1	0	0	100.00
Pa-Modou Kah	Norway	January 14, 2020 – January 21, 2022	41	19	8	14	46.34
James Merriman	Canada	January 21, 2022 – May 21, 2026	140	46	35	59	32.86
Yiannis Tsalatsidis (interim)	Canada	May 21, 2026 – July 6, 2026	6	0	2	4	0.00
Terry Dunfield	Canada	July 7, 2026 – present	16	2	6	8	12.50

=== Club captains ===
Years	Name	Nation
2019–2020	Marcel de Jong	Canada
2021–2022	Jamar Dixon	Canada
2023–2026	Josh Heard	Canada

== Team records ==
=== Year-by-year ===
Season	League												Playoffs	CC	Continental		Average attendance	Top goalscorer(s)	
Season	Div	League	Pld	W	D	L	GF	GA	GD	Pts	PPG	Pos.	Playoffs	CC	Continental		Average attendance	Name	Goals
2019	1	CPL	28	8	7	13	35	46	–11	31	1.11	5th	DNQ	R1	Ineligible		3,102	(Canada) Terran Campbell	11
2020	1	CPL	10	4	2	4	16	13	+3	14	1.40	–	4th	DNQ	DNQ		N/A	(Canada) Marco Bustos	5
2021	1	CPL	28	13	6	9	47	34	+13	45	1.61	3rd	W	SF	DNQ		3,812	(Canada) Terran Campbell	11
2022	1	CPL	28	13	7	8	36	33	+3	46	1.64	4th	SF	QF	CONCACAF League	R16	3,176	(Mexico) Alejandro Díaz	16
2023	1	CPL	28	11	7	10	42	35	+7	40	1.43	4th	SF	SF	DNQ		3,241	(Netherlands) Ayman Sellouf	7
2024	1	CPL	28	9	7	12	27	32	–5	34	1.21	5th	Play-in	SF	DNQ		3,041	(Canada) Dario Zanatta (Netherlands) Ayman Sellouf	5
2025	1	CPL	28	5	8	15	30	59	–29	23	0.82	7th	DNQ	PR	DNQ			(Mexico) Alejandro Díaz (France) Aly Ndom	6
2026	1	CPL	28	2	9	17	33	62	–29	15	0.54	8th	DNQ	PR	DNQ				

1. Average attendance include statistics from league matches only.
2. Top goalscorer(s) includes all goals scored in league season, league playoffs, Canadian Championship, CONCACAF League, and other competitive continental matches.

=== International competition ===
The following is a list of results for Pacific FC in international competitions. Pacific FC's scores are listed first.

Year	Tournament	Round	Opponent	Home	Away	Agg.
2022	CONCACAF League	Preliminary Round	(Jamaica) Waterhouse	6–0	0–0	6–0
2022	CONCACAF League	Round of 16	(Costa Rica) Herediano	0–1	1–0	1–1

== Player records ==
=== Most career goals ===
As of November 8, 2026

#	Pos.	Name	Nation	Career at club	Goals scored			
#	Pos.	Name	Nation	Career at club	CPL	CC	Int'l	Total
1	Forward	**Alejandro Diaz**	Mexico	2020–2022, 2025–	37	2	3	**42**
2	Forward	**Marco Bustos**	Canada	2020–2022, 2025–	24	0	1	**25**
2	Forward	Terran Campbell	Canada	2019–2021	23	2	0	**25**
3	Forward	Josh Heard	Canada	2020–2026	18	3	2	**23**
4	Midfielder	Manny Aparicio	Canada	2021–2023	9	1	0	**10**

Note: Bold indicates active player

=== Most career assists ===
As of November 8, 2026

#	Pos.	Name	Nation	Career at club	Goals assisted			
#	Pos.	Name	Nation	Career at club	CPL	CC	Int'l	Total
1	Forward	**Marco Bustos**	Canada	2022–2022, 2025–	25	0	0	**25**
2	Midfielder	Manny Aparicio	Canada	2021–2023	14	1	1	**16**
3	Forward	**Alejandro Diaz**	Mexico	2020–2022, 2025–	11	0	0	**11**
4	Forward	Terran Campbell	Canada	2019–2021	8	2	0	**10**
4	Forward	Josh Heard	Canada	2020–2026	7	1	2	**10**

Note: Bold indicates active player

=== Most career appearances ===
As of November 8, 2026

#	Pos.	Name	Nation	Career at club	Games played			
#	Pos.	Name	Nation	Career at club	CPL	CC	Int'l	Total
1	Forward	Josh Heard	Canada	2020–2026	145	13	4	**162**
2	Midfielder	Sean Young	Canada	2020–2025	143	10	4	**157**
3	Defender	Thomas Meilleur-Giguère	Canada	2020–2024	106	10	4	**120**
4	Defender	Kunle Dada-Luke	Canada	2021–2024	102	11	4	**117**
5	Defender	**Kadin Chung**	Canada	2019–2021, 2025–	106	6	0	**112**

Note: Bold indicates active player
