= 2026 Inter Toronto FC season =

Inter Toronto FC
2026 season
- Head coach: Mauro Eustáquio
- Stadium: York Lions Stadium
- Canadian Premier League: 6th
- CPL playoffs: Did not qualify
- Canadian Championship: Preliminary round

The 2026 Inter Toronto FC season was the eighth season in the history of Inter Toronto FC, and the first after the rebrand from York United FC. In addition to the Canadian Premier League, the club also competed in the Canadian Championship.

== Squad ==
As of August 19, 2026.

No.	Player	Nationality	Position(s)	Date of birth (age)	Previous club	Notes
Goalkeepers
12	Ivan Pavela	(Canada) / (Croatia)	GK	March 3, 2005 (age 21)	(Croatia) NK Dugopolje	U21
17	Antonio Campos	(Canada)	GK	July 25, 2006 (age 20)	(United States) Fullerton Titans	U21
Defenders
2	Alexander Bergman	(Estonia) / (Canada)	CB	December 8, 2004 (age 21)	(Estonia) Harju JK	
3	Luke Singh	(Trinidad and Tobago) / (Canada)	CB	September 12, 2000 (age 26)	(Canada) Toronto FC	
4	Oswaldo León	(Mexico)	CB	June 15, 1999 (age 27)	(Mexico) Dorados de Sinaloa	INT
5	Frank Sturing	(Canada)	CB	May 29, 1997 (age 29)	(Austria) SV Horn	
6	Raúl López	(Mexico)	RB	February 23, 1993 (age 33)	(Andorra) FC Rànger's	INT
8	Carlos Guzmán	(Mexico)	RB	May 19, 1994 (age 32)	(United States) Monterey Bay FC	INT
23	Juan Córdova	(Canada) / (Chile)	FB	June 25, 1995 (age 31)	(Chile) Unión San Felipe	
Midfielders
7	Steffen Yeates	(Canada)	CM	January 4, 2000 (age 26)	(Canada) Pacific FC	
10	Ollie Bassett	(Northern Ireland)	AM / LW	March 6, 1998 (age 28)	(United States) Tampa Bay Rowdies	
13	Luca Accettola	(Canada)	CM / AM	February 19, 2004 (age 22)	(Canada) York Lions	
16	Max Ferrari	(Canada)	RW / RB	August 20, 2000 (age 26)	(Canada) Aurora FC	
20	Gabriel Bitar	(Lebanon) / (Canada)	AM / CF	August 23, 1998 (age 28)	(Canada) Vancouver FC	
21	Kembo Kibato	(Canada)	MF	September 16, 2000 (age 26)	(Canada) Vancouver FC	
28	Jesse Costa	(Canada)	CM	April 28, 2005 (age 21)	(Brazil) Corinthians	U21
34	Anthony Umanzor	(Guatemala) / (El Salvador)	CM / DM	March 29, 2008 (age 18)	(Canada) Toronto FC Academy	U21, EYT
36	Ty Clarke	(Saint Vincent and the Grenadines) / (Canada)	LW / AM		(Canada) Inter Toronto II	U21
Forwards
9	Sebastián Gonzales	(Peru)	CF	December 6, 1999 (age 26)	(Albania) KF Teuta	INT
11	Ariel Almagro	(Ecuador)	LW	February 14, 2001 (age 25)	(Ecuador) Aucas	INT
18	Julian Altobelli	(Canada)	CF / AM	November 4, 2002 (age 23)	(Canada) Toronto FC II	
19	Shola Jimoh	(Canada)	LW	April 8, 2008 (age 18)	(Canada) York United FC Academy	U21, EYT
35	Chimaobim Onyeocha	(Canada) / (Nigeria)	FW		(Canada) Inter Toronto II	U21
38	David Peraza	(Canada)	LW / RW		(Canada) Inter Toronto II	U21
39	Béni Badibanga	(Belgium)	FW	February 19, 1996 (age 30)	(Canada) Forge FC	INT
77	Tomasz Skublak	(Canada)	ST	December 8, 1997 (age 28)	(Canada) Scrosoppi FC	

== Transfers ==
=== In ===
No.	Pos.	Player	From club	Fee/notes	Date	Source
	MF	(Northern Ireland) Ollie Bassett	(United States) Tampa Bay Rowdies	Free	December 1, 2025	
	DF	(Mexico) Raúl López	(Andorra) FC Rànger's	Free	January 13, 2026	
	FW	(Ecuador) Ariel Almagro	(Ecuador) Aucas	Free	January 15, 2026	
	FW	(Belgium) Béni Badibanga	(Canada) Forge FC	Free	January 19, 2026	
	GK	(Canada) Antonio Campos	(United States) Fullerton Titans	Free	February 6, 2026	
	FW	(Peru) Sebastián Gonzales	(Albania) KF Teuta	Free	February 9, 2026	
	DF	(Mexico) Carlos Guzmán	(United States) Monterey Bay FC	Free	February 11, 2026	
	DF	(Canada) Juan Córdova	(Chile) Unión San Felipe	Free	February 13, 2026	
	FW	(Canada) Tomasz Skublak	(Canada) Scrosoppi FC	Free	February 18, 2026	
	FW	(Canada) Chimaobim Onyeocha	(Canada) Inter Toronto II	Free	April 27, 2026	
	FW	(Canada) David Peraza	(Canada) Inter Toronto II	Free	July 13, 2026	
	MF	(Saint Vincent and the Grenadines) Ty Clarke	(Canada) Inter Toronto II	Free	August 19, 2026	

==== Loans in ====
No.	Pos.	Player	Loaned from	Fee/notes	Date	Source
1	GK	(Mexico) Diego Urtiaga	(Mexico) Atlético San Luis	Loaned until July 17, 2026	April 8, 2026	

==== Draft picks ====
Inter Toronto selected the following players in the 2026 CPL–U Sports Draft. Draft picks are not automatically signed to the team roster. Only those who are signed to a contract will be listed as transfers in.

Round	Selection	Pos.	Player	Nationality	University
2	12	GK	Michael Williams	Canada	York

=== Out ===
==== Transferred out ====
No.	Pos.	Player	To club	Fee/notes	Date	Source
6	DF	(Mexico) Orlando Botello	(Mexico) C.F. Monterrey U23	Loan ended	November 9, 2025	
1	GK	(Mexico) Diego Urtiaga	(Mexico) Atlético San Luis	Loan ended	November 9, 2025	
62	DF	(Canada) Nyal Higgins		Contract expired	December 31, 2025	
17	MF	(Mexico) Leonel López	(Mexico) Cancún FC	Contract expired	December 31, 2025	
15	DF	(Canada) Cameron DaSilva		Option declined	December 31, 2025	
23	DF	(Canada) Riley Ferrazzo		Option declined	December 31, 2025	
8	MF	(England) Elijah Adekugbe	(Australia) Preston Lions	Option declined	December 31, 2025	
9	FW	(Canada) Shaan Hundal	(United States) Brooklyn FC	Option declined	December 31, 2025	
10	FW	(Canada) Adonijah Reid	(United States) Sporting JAX	Option declined	December 31, 2025	
11	FW	(Canada) Massimo Ferrin		Option declined	December 31, 2025	

== Canadian Premier League ==
=== Regular season ===
11 April 2026 Match Week 1	Inter Toronto	2–2	HFX Wanderers	Toronto, Ontario
15:00 EDT (UTC-04:00)	Skublak (yellow card) 29'; Bitar (yellow card) 38'; Altobelli 43', 53'; Singh (yellow card) 68'	Report	Sow 49'; Godinho (yellow card) 77'; Ciccarelli 86'	Stadium: York Lions Stadium; Referee: Scott Bowman

19 April 2026 Match Week 2	Inter Toronto	1–0	Vancouver FC	Toronto, Ontario
17:00 EDT (UTC-04:00)	Jimoh (yellow card) 5'; Bitar 6'; Ferrari (yellow card) 45+4'; Skublak (yellow card) 55'; Altobelli (yellow card) 75'; Yeates (yellow card) 88'	Report		Stadium: York Lions Stadium; Referee: Mathieu Souaré

25 April 2026 Match Week 3	Cavalry FC	1–1	Inter Toronto	Foothills County, Alberta
15:00 MDT (UTC-06:00)	Paton (yellow card) 17'; Klomp 36'; Laing (yellow card) 74'	Report	Singh (yellow card) 19'; Jimoh (yellow card) 35'; Skublak 41'; Sturing (yellow card) 42'; Córdova (yellow card) 73'	Stadium: ATCO Field; Referee: Yusri Rudolf

1 May 2026 Match Week 4	Inter Toronto	4–1	Atlético Ottawa	Toronto, Ontario
19:30 EDT (UTC-04:00)	Singh (yellow card) 27'; Skublak 50', 55'; Cloutier 61' (o.g.); Altobelli 63'	Report	Aparicio (yellow card) 80'; Timóteo 84'; Aguilar (yellow card) 89'; Antinoro (yellow card) 90+2'; Kozlovskiy (yellow card) 90+5'	Stadium: York Lions Stadium; Referee: Sebastian Noshinravani

17 May 2026 Match Week 5	Pacific FC	0–1	Inter Toronto	Langford, British Columbia
14:00 PT (UTC-07:00)	Quintana (red card) 76'; Himaras (yellow card) 90+10'	Report	Ferrari (yellow card) 15'; Yeates (yellow card) 31'; Accettola (yellow card) 45+3'; Altobelli (yellow card) 66'; Gonzales 70'; Guzmán (yellow card) 82'; Bitar (yellow card) 90+4'	Stadium: Starlight Stadium

23 May 2026 Match Week 6	HFX Wanderers	1–1	Inter Toronto	Halifax, Nova Scotia
16:00 ADT (UTC-03:00)	Johnston 35'; Godinho (yellow card) 71'; Linder (yellow card) 77'	Report	Altobelli 22'; Gonzales (yellow card) 56'; Kibato (yellow card) 73'	Stadium: Wanderers Grounds; Referee: Mathieu Souaré

29 May 2026 Match Week 7	FC Supra	3–1	Inter Toronto	Laval, Quebec
19:00 EDT (UTC-04:00)	Boughanmi (yellow card) 29' (yellow-red card) 90+3'; Mlah 66'; Kwemi 69'; Abzi (yellow card) 75'; Rea 86'	Report	Skublak 71'	Stadium: Stade Boréale; Referee: Scott Bowman

7 June 2026 Match Week 8	Inter Toronto	1–4	Forge FC	Toronto, Ontario
14:00 EDT (UTC-04:00)	Córdova (yellow card) 32'; Ferrari 47'; López (yellow card) 74'	Report	Jevremović 17'; Massunda 26'; Borges 50'; Babouli (yellow card) 53'; Paton 70'	Stadium: York Lions Stadium; Referee: Mario Alayass

10 June 2026 Match Week 9	Inter Toronto	1–5	Cavalry FC	Toronto, Ontario
19:30 EDT (UTC-04:00)	Singh (yellow card) 60'; Laing 68' (o.g.); Ferrari (yellow card) 90+1'	Report	Warschewski 10'; Camargo 44'; Edwards 52'; Klomp (yellow card) 73'; Elva 87'; Myroniuk 90+3'	Stadium: York Lions Stadium; Referee: Yusri Rudolf

4 July 2026 Match Week 12	Vancouver FC	4–0	Inter Toronto	Langley, British Columbia
16:00 PT (UTC-07:00)	Mezquida 1'; Amissi 6', 38', 43'	Report	León (yellow card) 53'; Jimoh (yellow card) 64'; Almagro (yellow card) 73'	Stadium: Willoughby Stadium; Referee: Renzo Villanueva

17 July 2026 Match Week 11	Atlético Ottawa	1–1	Inter Toronto	Ottawa, Ontario
19:00 EDT (UTC-04:00)	Tabla 54'; Dunn (yellow card) 84'; Assi (yellow card) 85'; Khoury (yellow card) 90+1'	Report	Skublak (yellow card) 33'; Altobelli (yellow card) 38', (goal) 56'	Stadium: TD Place Stadium; Referee: Ben Hoskins

26 July 2026 Match Week 12	Inter Toronto	1–3	Forge FC	Toronto, Ontario
17:00 EDT (UTC-04:00)	Córdova (yellow card) 19'; Skublak 44', (yellow card) 45+4'; Badibanga (yellow card) 71'	Report	Batisse (yellow card) 18'; Ampomah 41', 56'; Jevremović (yellow card) 82'; Oketokoun 86'	Stadium: York Lions Stadium; Referee: Scott Bowman

1 Aug. 2026 Match Week 13	Cavalry FC	5–0	Inter Toronto	Foothills County, Alberta
19:00 MDT (UTC-06:00)	Pearlman 17'; Antoniuk 51'; Musse 61'; Edwards 68'; Elva 86'	Report	Guzmán (yellow card) 65'; Skublak (yellow card) 74'	Stadium: ATCO Field; Referee: Carly Shaw-MacLaren

8 Aug. 2026 Match Week 14	Pacific FC	v	Inter Toronto	Langford, British Columbia
				Stadium: Starlight Stadium

16 Aug. 2026 Match Week 15	Inter Toronto	v	HFX Wanderers	Toronto, Ontario
				Stadium: York Lions Stadium

23 Aug. 2026 Match Week 16	Inter Toronto	v	FC Supra	Toronto, Ontario
				Stadium: York Lions Stadium

28 Aug. 2026 Match Week 17	Atlético Ottawa	v	Inter Toronto	Ottawa, Ontario
				Stadium: TD Place Stadium

9 Sept. 2026 Match Week 18	Inter Toronto	v	Pacific FC	Toronto, Ontario
				Stadium: York Lions Stadium

5 Sept. 2026 Match Week 19	Forge FC	v	Inter Toronto	Hamilton, Ontario
				Stadium: Hamilton Stadium

13 Sept. 2026 Match Week 20	Inter Toronto	v	Vancouver FC	Toronto, Ontario
				Stadium: York Lions Stadium

23 Sept. 2026 Match Week 21	Vancouver FC	v	Inter Toronto	Langley, British Columbia
				Stadium: Willoughby Stadium

20 Sept. 2026 Match Week 22	HFX Wanderers	v	Inter Toronto	Halifax, Nova Scotia
				Stadium: Wanderers Grounds

27 Sept. 2026 Match Week 23	Inter Toronto	v	Pacific FC	Toronto, Ontario
				Stadium: York Lions Stadium

3 Oct. 2026 Match Week 24	Inter Toronto	v	Cavalry FC	Toronto, Ontario
				Stadium: York Lions Stadium

7 Oct. 2026 Match Week 25	Inter Toronto	v	FC Supra	Toronto, Ontario
				Stadium: York Lions Stadium

12 Oct. 2026 Match Week 26	Forge FC	v	Inter Toronto	Hamilton, Ontario
				Stadium: Hamilton Stadium

17 Oct. 2026 Match Week 27	FC Supra	v	Inter Toronto	Laval, Quebec
				Stadium: Stade Boréale

25 Oct. 2026 Match Week 28	Inter Toronto	v	Atlético Ottawa	Toronto, Ontario
				Stadium: York Lions Stadium

== Canadian Championship ==
Inter Toronto entered the 2026 Canadian Championship in the preliminary round with a home match against tier three opponents, the 2025 Ligue 1 Québec champions, CS Saint-Laurent.

10 May 2026 Preliminary round	Inter Toronto FC	0–1	CS Saint-Laurent	Toronto, Ontario
15:00 EDT (UTC-04:00)	Bassett (yellow card) 35'; Skublak (yellow card) 88'; Singh (yellow card) 90+8'	Report	Chibane 18'; Catavolo (yellow card) 18'; Chaouki (yellow card) 76'; Toussaint (yellow card) 90+8'	Stadium: York Lions Stadium; Referee: Carly Shaw-MacLaren
