= 2025 York United FC season =

York United FC
2025 season
- Head coach: Mauro Eustáquio
- Stadium: York Lions Stadium
- Canadian Premier League: 5th
- CPL playoffs: Quarter-finals
- Canadian Championship: Quarter-finals
- Top goalscorer: League: Julian Altobelli (10); All: Julian Altobelli (15)
- Highest home attendance: 7,218 (May 31 vs HFX Wanderers FC)
- Average home league attendance: 2,055
Home colours	Away colours

The 2025 York United FC season was the seventh season in the history of York United FC, and the last before being rebranded as Inter Toronto FC. In addition to the Canadian Premier League, the club also competed in the Canadian Championship.

Following the 2024 season, manager Benjamín Mora departed the team, to become the new head coach of Liga MX club Querétaro. He was replaced by former interim manager Mauro Eustáquio, who became the youngest head coach in Canadian Premier League history.

== Squad ==
As of August 15, 2025.

No.	Player	Nationality	Position(s)	Date of birth (age)	Previous club	Notes
Goalkeepers
1	Diego Urtiaga	(Mexico)	GK	October 9, 1998 (aged 27)	(Mexico) Atlético San Luis	INT, Loan
12	Ivan Pavela	(Canada) / (Croatia)	GK	March 3, 2005 (aged 20)	(Croatia) NK Dugopolje	U21
Defenders
3	Luke Singh	(Trinidad and Tobago) / (Canada)	CB	September 12, 2000 (aged 25)	(Canada) Toronto FC	
4	Oswaldo León	(Mexico)	CB	June 15, 1999 (aged 26)	(Mexico) Dorados de Sinaloa	INT
5	Frank Sturing	(Canada)	CB	May 29, 1997 (aged 28)	(Austria) SV Horn	
6	Orlando Botello	(Mexico)	LB	August 6, 2001 (aged 24)	(Mexico) C.F. Monterrey U23	INT, Loan
15	Cameron DaSilva	(Canada)	CB	December 19, 2002 (aged 23)	(Canada) Simcoe County Rovers	
23	Riley Ferrazzo	(Canada)	FB	August 4, 1999 (aged 26)	(Canada) HFX Wanderers	
62	Nyal Higgins	(Canada)	CB	January 19, 1998 (aged 27)	(Canada) Vaughan Azzurri	
Midfielders
7	Steffen Yeates	(Canada)	CM	January 4, 2000 (aged 25)	(Canada) Pacific FC	
8	Elijah Adekugbe	(England) / (Canada)	MF	July 17, 1996 (aged 29)	(Canada) Cavalry FC	
16	Max Ferrari	(Canada)	LW / RW	August 20, 2000 (aged 25)	(Canada) Aurora FC	
17	Leonel López	(Mexico)	CM	May 24, 1994 (aged 31)	(Bolivia) The Strongest	INT
20	Gabriel Bitar	(Lebanon) / (Canada)	AM / CF	August 23, 1998 (aged 27)	(Canada) Vancouver FC	
21	Kembo Kibato	(Canada)	MF	September 16, 2000 (aged 25)	(Canada) Vancouver FC	
28	Jesse Costa	(Canada)	CM	April 28, 2005 (aged 20)	(Brazil) Corinthians	U21
32	Luca Accettola	(Canada)	CM / AM	February 19, 2004 (aged 21)	(Canada) York Lions	U21, U-S
33	Joshua Lopez	(Canada)	MF	May 26, 2008 (aged 17)	(Canada) TFC Academy	DEV
Forwards
9	Shaan Hundal	(Canada)	CF	July 14, 1999 (aged 26)	(Canada) Valour FC	
10	Adonijah Reid	(Canada)	CF	August 13, 1999 (aged 26)	(Canada) Pacific FC	
11	Massimo Ferrin	(Canada)	CF / RW / LW	December 6, 1998 (aged 27)	(Canada) HFX Wanderers	
18	Julian Altobelli	(Canada)	CF / AM	November 4, 2002 (aged 23)	(Canada) Toronto FC II	
19	Shola Jimoh	(Canada)	LW	April 8, 2008 (aged 17)	(Canada) York United FC Academy	U21, EYT
Out on loan
2	Alexander Bergman (at Harju JK Laagri)	(Estonia) / (Canada)	CB	December 8, 2004 (aged 21)	(Estonia) Nõmme United	U21

== Transfers ==
=== In ===
No.	Pos.	Player	From club	Fee/notes	Date	Source
10	FW	(Canada) Adonijah Reid	(Canada) Pacific FC	Free	January 7, 2025	
23	DF	(Canada) Riley Ferrazzo	(Canada) HFX Wanderers	Free	January 9, 2025	
20	MF	(Lebanon) Gabriel Bitar	(Canada) Vancouver FC	Transferred for the first round pick in the 2026 CPL–U Sports Draft	January 13, 2025	
15	DF	(Canada) Cameron DaSilva	(Canada) Simcoe County Rovers	Free	January 14, 2025	
7	MF	(Canada) Steffen Yeates	(Canada) Pacific FC	Undisclosed fee	January 20, 2025	
3	DF	(Trinidad and Tobago) Luke Singh	(Canada) Toronto FC	Free	January 22, 2025	
2	DF	(Estonia) Alexander Bergman	(Estonia) Nõmme United	Free	January 27, 2025	
22	FW	(Bulgaria) Marsel Bibishkov	(Italy) Juventus U17	Free	January 29, 2025	
18	FW	(Canada) Julian Altobelli	(Canada) Toronto FC II	Free	January 31, 2025	
11	FW	(Canada) Massimo Ferrin	(Canada) HFX Wanderers	Undisclosed fee	February 3, 2025	
12	GK	(Canada) Ivan Pavela	(Croatia) NK Dugopolje	Free	February 5, 2025	
33	MF	(Canada) Joshua Lopez	(Canada) TFC Academy	Developmental contract	April 4, 2025	
30	MF	(Canada) Christian Zeppieri	(Canada) York Lions	U-Sports contract	April 4, 2025	
32	MF	(Canada) Luca Accettola	(Canada) York Lions	Selected 5th in the 2025 CPL–U Sports Draft, U-Sports contract	April 4, 2025	
9	FW	(Portugal) Bryan Rosa	(Portugal) SC Pombal	Free	April 24, 2025	
9	FW	(Canada) Shaan Hundal	(Canada) Valour FC	Free	July 17, 2025	
	MF	(Mexico) Leonel López	(Bolivia) The Strongest	Free	July 25, 2025	
	MF	(Canada) Jesse Costa	(Brazil) Corinthians	Free	August 15, 2025	

==== Loans in ====
No.	Pos.	Player	Loaned from	Fee/notes	Date	Source
6	DF	(Mexico) Orlando Botello	(Mexico) C.F. Monterrey U23	Loaned until end of season	January 24, 2025	
1	GK	(Mexico) Diego Urtiaga	(Mexico) Atlético San Luis	Loaned until end of season	April 3, 2025	

==== Draft picks ====
York United selected the following players in the 2025 CPL–U Sports Draft. Draft picks are not automatically signed to the team roster. Only those who are signed to a contract will be listed as transfers in.

Round	Selection	Pos.	Player	Nationality	University
1	5	MF	Luca Accettola	Canada	York
2	13	FW	Matthew Fischer	Canada	York

=== Out ===
==== Transferred out ====
No.	Pos.	Player	To club	Fee/notes	Date	Source
15	MF	(Mexico) Josué Martínez		Loan expired	November 10, 2024	
24	MF	(Canada) Tomas Giraldo		Loan expired	November 10, 2024	
20	FW	(Mexico) Jorge Guzmán		Loan expired	November 10, 2024	
12	MF	(Mexico) Santiago Márquez		Loan expired	November 10, 2024	
18	GK	(Canada) Eleias Himaras	(Canada) Valour FC	Contract expired	December 31, 2024	
23	DF	(Canada) Noah Abatneh	(Canada) Atlético Ottawa	Contract expired	December 31, 2024	
12	MF	(Canada) Clément Bayiha	(Iceland) Þór Akureyri	Contract expired	December 31, 2024	
30	MF	(Canada) Kadin Martin-Pereux		Contract expired	December 31, 2024	
33	MF	(Philippines) Matthew Baldisimo		Contract expired	December 31, 2024	
9	FW	(Canada) Brian Wright	(Canada) Forge FC	Contract expired	December 31, 2024	
10	FW	(Syria) Molham Babouli	(Canada) Forge FC	Contract expired	December 31, 2024	
14	FW	(Canada) Theo Afework		Contract expired	December 31, 2024	
1	GK	(France) Thomas Vincensini		Option declined	January 13, 2025	
11	FW	(Liechtenstein) Dennis Salanović		Option declined	January 13, 2025	
7	MF	(Canada) Juan Córdova	(Chile) Unión San Felipe	Contract terminated by mutual consent	January 23, 2025	
9	FW	(Portugal) Bryan Rosa		Contract terminated by mutual consent	June 6, 2025	
22	FW	(Bulgaria) Marsel Bibishkov	(Bulgaria) Slavia Sofia	Contract terminated by mutual consent	June 30, 2025	
17	MF	(Ukraine) Markiyan Voytsekhovskyy	(Canada) Valour FC	Contract terminated by mutual consent	July 17, 2025	

==== Loans out ====
No.	Pos.	Player	Loaned to	Fee/notes	Date	Source
2	DF	(Estonia) Alexander Bergman	(Estonia) Harju JK Laagri	Loaned until end of season	July 2, 2025	

== Pre-season and friendlies ==
Win Draw Loss Fixtures

March 5, 2025 Friendly	York United FC	2-2	S.C.U. Torreense	Torres Vedras, Portugal
		Report		Stadium: Estádio Manuel Marques

March 14, 2025 Friendly	York United FC	v	AS Laval
Note: Game played behind closed doors

March 21, 2024 Friendly	York United FC	v	Valour FC
Note: Game played behind closed doors

March 28, 2024 Friendly	York United FC	v	Simcoe County Rovers FC
Note: Game played behind closed doors

== Competitions ==
Matches are listed in Toronto local time: Eastern Daylight Time (UTC−4) until November 3, and Eastern Standard Time (UTC−5) otherwise.

=== Overview ===
Competition	Record							
Competition	Pld	W	D	L	GF	GA	GD	Win %
Canadian Premier League	28	10	8	10	43	38	+5	35.71
Canadian Championship	3	1	0	2	9	6	+3	33.33
Total	31	11	8	12	52	44	+8	35.48

Last updated: Oct 18, 2025
Source: Competitions

=== Canadian Premier League ===
==== Table ====
Pos	Team	Pld	W	D	L	GF	GA	GD	Pts	Qualification
1	Forge (S)	28	16	10	2	51	22	+29	58	First semifinal and 2026 CONCACAF Champions Cup
2	Atlético Ottawa (C)	28	15	11	2	54	28	+26	56	First semifinal
3	Cavalry	28	11	9	8	47	36	+11	42	Quarterfinal
4	HFX Wanderers	28	11	6	11	41	34	+7	39	Play-in round
5	York United	28	10	8	10	43	38	+5	38	Play-in round
6	Valour	28	7	5	16	35	62	−27	26	
7	Pacific	28	5	8	15	30	59	−29	23	
8	Vancouver	28	4	9	15	35	57	−22	21	2026 CONCACAF Champions Cup (Note: Vancouver FC qualified for the Champions Cup as the runners-up of the 2025 Canadian Championship, due to the winners, Vancouver Whitecaps FC, qualifying through Major League Soccer.)

Source: CanPL
Rules for classification: 1) Points; 2) Total number of wins; 3) Head-to-head; 4) Goal differential; 5) Goals for; 6) Away goals differential; 7) Away goals for; 8) Home goals differential; 9) Home goals for; 10) Fewest disciplinary points; 11) Most under-21 domestic player minutes; 12) Drawing of lots.
(C) Champion (qualified to Champions Cup Round one); (S) CPL Shield winner (qualified to Champions Cup Round one)

==== Results by match ====
Match	1	2	3	4	5	6	7	8	9	10	11	12	13	14	15	16	17	18	19	20	21	22	23	24	25	26	27	28
Result	W	L	L	D	L	L	L	W	W	L	W	D	D	W	W	W	D	L	D	W	L	W	D	L	W	D	D	W
Position	1	4	4	4	6	7	7	6	5	5	5	5	5	5	5	5	4	4	4	4	4	5	4	5	4	4	5	5

Updated to match(es) played on Oct 18, 2025. Source: #Matches
W = Win; D = Draw; L = Loss

==== Matches ====
April 6 1	Vancouver FC	0–2	York United FC	Langley, British Columbia
7:00pm	Fry (yellow card) 54'	Report	Ferrin (yellow card) 20'; Altobelli 66' 84'; Singh (yellow card) 70'; Jimoh (yellow card) 75'	Stadium: Willoughby Community Park; Attendance: 1,435; Referee: Alain Ruch

April 13 2	York United FC	1–2	HFX Wanderers FC	Toronto, Ontario
3:00pm	Bitar 22' (yellow card) 71'; Higgins (yellow card) 78'; Ferrari (yellow card) 86'; Adekugbe (yellow card) 86'	Report	Callegari (yellow card) 42'; Johnston (yellow card) 43'; Probo 53' (yellow card) 71'; Coimbra 81' (yellow card) 82'; Mekidèche (yellow card) 86'; Yesli (yellow card) 90+4'	Stadium: York Lions Stadium; Attendance: 2,087; Referee: Renzo Villanueva

April 19 3	Atlético Ottawa	3–2	York United FC	Ottawa, Ontario
1:00pm	Abatneh (yellow card) 31' (goal) 90+5'; Rodríguez (yellow card) 43'; Salter 51'; Aparicio 56' (yellow card) 72'	Report	León (yellow card) 2'; Altobelli 11'; Bitar (yellow card) 21'; Singh (yellow card) 53'; Adekugbe (yellow card) 59'; Jimoh (yellow card) 66'; Kibato (yellow card) 68'; Ferrazzo 83' (yellow card) 90+5'	Stadium: TD Place Stadium; Attendance: 3,337; Referee: Mario Alayass

April 27 4	York United FC	2–2	Forge FC	Toronto, Ontario
2:00pm	Ferrazzo 14' (yellow card) 66'; Singh (yellow card) 25'; Altobelli 29' (pen.)	Report	Rama 12' (yellow card) 45+4'; Wright 33' (pen.)	Stadium: York Lions Stadium; Attendance: 1,679; Referee: Scott Bowman

May 2 5	York United FC	1–2	Cavalry FC	Toronto, Ontario
8:00pm	Higgins (yellow card) 6'; Yeates (yellow card) 36'; Altobelli 45+1'; Singh (yellow card) 75'; Ferrari (yellow card) 90+3'	Report	Warschewski 9'; Aird 69' (yellow card) 90+5'; Laing (yellow card) 77'	Stadium: York Lions Stadium; Attendance: 1,342; Referee: Fabrizio Stasolla

May 10 6	Pacific FC	2-1	York United FC	Langford, British Columbia
7:00pm	Zanatta 44' (pen.); Daniels (yellow card) 55'; Heard (yellow card) 57'; Montejano (yellow card) 68' (goal) 90+2'; Anchor (yellow card) 90+3'	Report	Ferrazzo (yellow card) 10'; Bitar 25'; Sturing (yellow card) 27'; Yeates (yellow card) 90+2'; León (yellow card) 90+10'	Stadium: Starlight Stadium; Attendance: 2,821; Referee: Renzo Villanueva

May 16 7	Valour FC	2-1	York United FC	Winnipeg, Manitoba
8:00pm	Romeo (yellow card) 37'; Egwu (yellow card) 43' (goal) 84'; Twardek 51'	Report	Ferrazzo (yellow card) 21'; Bitar 42'; Altobelli (yellow card) 45'; Kibato (yellow card) 45+3'; Adekugbe (yellow card) 47'; Botello (yellow card) 89'	Stadium: IG Field; Attendance: 1,591; Referee: Mathieu Souaré

May 25 8	York United FC	2-1	Vancouver FC	Toronto, Ontario
2:00pm	Altobelli 29'; Botello (yellow card) 87'; León (yellow card) 90+4'; Rosa (yellow card) 90+4'	Report	Essoussi (yellow card) 43'; Godbout (yellow card) 79'; Tahid (yellow card) 90+3'; O'Connor (yellow card) 90+3'	Stadium: York Lions Stadium; Attendance: 1,452; Referee: Mario Alayass

May 31 9	York United FC	2-0	HFX Wanderers FC	Quebec City, Quebec
4:00pm	Ferrazzo (yellow card) 12'; Altobelli 29'; Urtiaga (yellow card) 86'; Yeates 89'	Report	Callegari (yellow card) 51'; Pearlman (yellow card) 61'	Stadium: Telus Stadium; Attendance: 7,218; Referee: Sebastian Noshinravani
Note: Canadian Premier League “On Tour” match in Quebec City

June 8 10	Cavalry FC	2-1	York United FC	Calgary, Alberta
6:00pm	Camargo 2' 51'; Aird (yellow card) 35'; Field (yellow card) 45+1'; Herdman (yellow card) 90+1'	Report	Ferrari (yellow card) 9'; Kibato (yellow card) 50'; Ferrin 52'; Botello (yellow card) 53'; Adekugbe (yellow card) 78'; Zeppieri (yellow card) 85'; Umanzor (yellow card) 88'	Stadium: ATCO Field; Attendance: 5,114; Referee: Michael Venne

June 14 11	Pacific FC	1-3	York United FC	Langford, British Columbia
6:00pm	Young (yellow card) 11'; Ndom 20' (yellow card) 59'; Anchor (yellow card) 79'; Botello 70'	Report	Kibato (yellow card) 42'; Accettola 53'; Ferrazzo 60'	Stadium: Starlight Stadium; Attendance: 2,604; Referee: Alain Ruch

June 22 12	York United FC	0-0	Atlético Ottawa	Toronto, Ontario
1:00pm		Report	Kozlovskiy (yellow card) 10'	Stadium: York Lions Stadium; Attendance: 1,364; Referee: Yusri Rudolf

June 29 13	Forge FC	2-2	York United FC	Hamilton, Ontario
4:00pm	Rama (yellow card) 26'; Wright 40' (yellow card) 72'; Ampomah (yellow card) 66'; Owolabi-Belewu (yellow card) 69'; Choinière 79'	Report	Ferrin 19'; Adekugbe (yellow card) 27'; Reid 45+1' (yellow card) 50'; Yeates (yellow card) 84'	Stadium: Tim Hortons Field; Attendance: 6,621; Referee: Michael Venne

July 13 14	York United FC	3-2	Valour FC	Toronto, Ontario
6:00pm	Altobelli 45+1' (pen.); Yeates 54+4'; Reid 47'; León (yellow card) 53'; Ferrari (yellow card) 78'; Botello (yellow card) 89'; Jimoh (yellow card) 90+1'	Report	Ressurreição (yellow card) 15'; Williams 22'; Froese (yellow card) 36'; Viscosi (yellow card) 45'; Morgan 61'; Alarcón (yellow card) 90+2'	Stadium: York Lions Stadium; Attendance: 2,117; Referee: Scott Bowman

July 19 15	York United FC	4-0	Vancouver FC	Toronto, Ontario
4:00pm	Reid 3'; Bitar 84' 90+2'; Kibato 88'	Report	O'Connor (yellow card) 49'	Stadium: York Lions Stadium; Attendance: 1,349; Referee: Niko Jecanski

July 26 16	Cavalry FC	0-1	York United FC	Calgary, Alberta
5:00pm	Piepgrass (yellow card) 57'; Camargo (yellow card) 89'; Gutiérrez (yellow card) 90+8'	Report	Altobell 36'; Bitar (yellow card) 45'; Sturing (yellow card) 58'; León (yellow card) 75'; Jimoh (yellow card) 80'; Urtiaga (yellow card) 90+2'	Stadium: ATCO Field; Attendance: 4,496; Referee: Fabrizio Stasolla

August 3 17	Atlético Ottawa	0-0	York United FC	Ottawa, Ontario
4:00pm	Aparicio (yellow card) 16'; Castro (yellow card) 26'; Ingham (yellow card) 72'	Report	Reid (yellow card) 41'; Ferrin (yellow card) 62'; León (yellow card) 72'	Stadium: TD Place Stadium; Attendance: 5,175; Referee: Ben Hoskins

August 9 18	York United FC	1–2	Forge FC	Toronto, Ontario
1:00 pm	Bitar (yellow card) 5'; Reid (yellow card) 11'; Sturing (yellow card) 35'; López 38'	Report	Borges 14'; Filion 54'; Ampomah (yellow card) 63'	Stadium: York Lions Stadium; Attendance: 1,681; Referee: Roberto D'Alesio
Note: Kick-off was rescheduled from 2:00 pm.

August 17 19	Valour FC	0-0	York United FC	Winnipeg, Manitoba
3:00pm	Figueiredo (yellow card) 54'; Egwu (yellow card) 56'; Mlah (yellow card) 58'; Ohin (yellow card) 68'	Report	Sturingi (yellow card) 71'	Stadium: IG Field; Attendance: 2,294; Referee: Mathieu Souaré

August 24 20	York United FC	5–1	Pacific FC	Toronto, Ontario
4:00pm	Hundall 10', 72', 80', 82'; López 16'; Reid (yellow card) 52'	Report	Díaz 45'; Zanatta (yellow card) 48'	Stadium: York Lions Stadium; Attendance: 1,583; Referee: Ben Hoskins

Sept 1 21	HFX Wanderers FC	4-0	York United FC	Halifax, Nova Scotia
3:00pm	Dias 11'; Bahamboula 26' (pen.); Timoteo (yellow card) 45+2'; Bahamboula 57'; Sow (yellow card) 75'; Baï 80'	Report	Bitar (yellow card) 24'; Kibato (yellow card) 54'; León (yellow card) 70'; Altobelli (yellow card) 89'; León (yellow card) 90+3'	Stadium: Wanderers Grounds; Attendance: 6,811; Referee: Renzo Villanueva

Sept 5 22	York United FC	3-1	Cavalry FC	Toronto, Ontario
7:30pm	Higgins (yellow card) 6'; Reid (yellow card) 10', (goal) 40'; Singh (yellow card) 30'; López 59', (yellow card) 72'; Botello (yellow card) 70'; Ferrari 84'	Report	Klomp (yellow card) 55'; Kamdem (yellow card) 57'; Aird 87' (pen.)	Stadium: York Lions Stadium; Attendance: 1,546; Referee: Michael Venne

Sept 14 23	York United FC	2-2	Atlético Ottawa	Toronto, Ontario
2:00pm	Yeates 10'; Hundal (yellow card) 12'; Sturing 54'; Botello (yellow card) 62'	Report	Salter 8', 49'; Levis (yellow card) 38'; Assi (yellow card) 90+2'	Stadium: York Lions Stadium; Attendance: 2,108; Referee: Sebastian Noshinravani

Sept 21 24	Vancouver FC	2-1	York United FC	Langley, British Columbia
6:00pm	Pathé 31'; Gee 44' (yellow card) 59'; Campbell (yellow card) 74'	Report	Sturing (yellow card) 15'; Ferrin 40'	Stadium: Willoughby Community Park; Referee: Mathieu Souaré

Sept 28 25	York United FC	1-0	Valour FC	Toronto, Ontario
3:00pm	Altobelli 44' (yellow card) 52'; Bitar (yellow card) 80'	Report	Antonoglou (yellow card) 40'; Figueiredo (yellow card) 65'; Alarcón (yellow card) 72'	Stadium: York Lions Stadium; Referee: Mario Alayass

Oct 4 26	HFX Wanderers FC	1-1	York United FC	Halifax, Nova Scotia
2:00pm	Mekidèche 44'; Alphonse (yellow card) 36'; Pearlman (yellow card) 36'; Timoteo (yellow card) 45+3'; Baï (yellow card) 90+5'	Report	Ferrari (yellow card) 45+1'; López (yellow card) 45+3'; Sturing (yellow card) 62'; Ferrin 68'; Ferrazzo (yellow card) 90+3'	Stadium: Wanderers Grounds; Referee: Scott Bowman

Oct 9 27	York United FC	2-2	Pacific FC	Toronto, Ontario
7:30pm	Ferrari (yellow card) 48'; López (yellow card) 54'; Jimoh (yellow card) 73'; Hundal 74'; Accettola 90+4'	Report	Bustos 21'; Juhmi (yellow card) 30'; Díaz 34' (pen.); Ndom (yellow card) 85'; Montejano (yellow card) 90+4'	Stadium: York Lions Stadium; Referee: Mathieu Souaré

Oct 18 28	Forge FC	3-0	York United FC	Hamilton, Ontario
4:00pm	Hojabrpour 11'; Wright 45+2' 54'	Report	Singh (yellow card) 27'; Kibato (yellow card) 35'; Costa (yellow card) 90+2'	Stadium: Tim Hortons Field; Referee: Carly Shaw-MacLaren

==== Playoff matches ====
October 22 Play-In Round	HFX Wanderers FC	2-2 (4-5 p)	York United FC	Halifax, Nova Scotia
6:30pm	Rea (yellow card) 13'; Coimbra 45+1'; Alphonse (yellow card) 51'; Callegari (yellow card) 66'; Gagnon-Laparé (yellow card) 105' (goal) 114'; Johnston (yellow card) 118'	Report	Ferrazzo (yellow card) 16'; Reid (yellow card) 26'; Kibato (yellow card) 38'; Bitar (yellow card) 82'; Altobelli 86'; Singh (yellow card) 88'; Jimoh (yellow card) 90'; Hundal 119'	Stadium: Wanderers Grounds; Referee: Sebastian Noshinravani
	Penalties
	Coimbra (penalty scored); Callegari (penalty missed); Timoteo (penalty scored); Johnston (penalty scored); Baï (penalty scored); Gagnon-Laparé (penalty missed)		(penalty scored) Altobelli; (penalty scored) Bitar; (penalty scored) Hundal; (penalty missed) Yeates; (penalty scored) Ferrin; (penalty scored) Kibato

October 26 Quarterfinal	Cavalry FC	4-1	York United FC	Calgary, Alberta
6:00pm	Musse 8'; Warschewski 17' 58'; Singh 47' (o.g.)	Report	Kibato (yellow card) 38'; Ferrari (yellow card) 43'; Hundal 44'; Costa (yellow card) 85'; Altobelli (yellow card) 89'	Stadium: ATCO Field; Referee: Ben Hoskins

=== Canadian Championship ===
May 6 Preliminary Round	York United FC	5-0	FC Laval	Toronto, Ontario
7:00pm	Altobelli 45'; Ferrari 45+3'; Reid 52'; Rosa 64'; Ferrin 79' (pen.)	Report	Moteng (yellow card) 18'; Bouchemella (yellow card) 22'; Amla (yellow card) 40'; Eze (yellow card) 78'	Stadium: York Lions Stadium; Attendance: 1,072; Referee: Ben Hoskins

June 11 Quarter-Finals Leg 1	Atlético Ottawa	2-1	York United FC	Ottawa, Ontario
7:00pm	Tabla 16'; Rodríguez (yellow card) 18'; Abatneh (yellow card) 45+2'; Aparicio (yellow card) 73'; Coulanges (yellow card) 90+2'; Cloutier (yellow card) 90+5'	Report	Altobelli 5' (yellow card) 30'; Kibato (yellow card) 52'; Ferrazzo (yellow card) 74'	Stadium: TD Place Stadium; Attendance: 2,084; Referee: Mario Alayass

July 8 Quarter-Finals Leg 2	York United FC	3-4	Atlético Ottawa	Toronto, Ontario
7:00pm	Altobelli 13' 37'; Adekugbe (red card) 26'; Ferrazzo (yellow card) 45+1'; Ferrin 53'; Pavela (yellow card) 65'; Yeates (yellow card) 66'	Report	Rodríguez 7'; Salter 9' 84'; Tabla (yellow card) 31'; Antinoro (yellow card) 70'; Sissoko 90+2' (yellow card) 90+3'	Stadium: York Lions Stadium; Attendance: 688; Referee: Sebastian Noshinravani

== Statistics ==
=== Squad and statistics ===
As of October 26, 2025

No.	Pos	Nat	Player	Total		Canadian Premier League		Canadian Championship	
No.	Pos	Nat	Player	Apps	Goals	Apps	Goals	Apps	Goals
Goalkeepers
1	GK	(Mexico) MEX	Diego Urtiaga	24	0	23+0	0	1+0	0
12	GK	(Canada) CAN	Ivan Pavela	9	0	7+0	0	2+0	0
Defenders
2	DF	(Estonia) EST	Alexander Bergman	3	0	0+3	0	0+0	0
3	DF	(Trinidad and Tobago) TTO	Luke Singh	29	0	25+1	0	1+2	0
4	DF	(Mexico) MEX	Oswaldo León	22	0	19+0	0	3+0	0
5	DF	(Canada) CAN	Frank Sturing	24	1	21+0	1	3+0	0
6	DF	(Mexico) MEX	Orlando Botello	24	1	17+4	1	3+0	0
15	DF	(Canada) CAN	Cameron DaSilva	6	0	0+5	0	0+1	0
23	DF	(Canada) CAN	Riley Ferrazzo	26	3	18+5	3	2+1	0
62	DF	(Canada) CAN	Nyal Higgins	18	0	9+7	0	0+2	0
Midfielders
7	MF	(Canada) CAN	Steffen Yeates	22	3	19+1	3	2+0	0
8	MF	(England) ENG	Elijah Adekugbe	25	0	18+5	0	2+0	0
16	MF	(Canada) CAN	Max Ferrari	32	2	23+6	1	1+2	1
17	MF	(Mexico) MEX	Leonel López	11	3	9+2	3	0+0	0
17	MF	(Ukraine) UKR	Markiyan Voytsekhovskyy	2	0	0+2	0	0+0	0
20	MF	(Lebanon) LBN	Gabriel Bitar	27	5	11+15	5	0+1	0
21	MF	(Canada) CAN	Kembo Kibato	33	1	26+4	1	3+0	0
28	MF	(Canada) CAN	Jesse Costa	5	0	0+5	0	0+0	0
30	MF	(Canada) CAN	Christian Zeppieri	3	0	0+2	0	0+1	0
32	MF	(Canada) CAN	Luca Accettola	16	2	5+10	2	1+0	0
33	MF	(Canada) CAN	Joshua Lopez	5	0	0+4	0	0+1	0
34	MF	(El Salvador) ESA	Anthony Umanzor	1	0	0+1	0	0+0	0
Forwards
9	FW	(Canada) CAN	Shaan Hundal	16	9	7+9	9	0+0	0
9	FW	(Portugal) POR	Bryan Rosa	6	1	0+5	0	1+0	1
10	FW	(Canada) CAN	Adonijah Reid	30	5	20+7	4	2+1	1
11	FW	(Canada) CAN	Massimo Ferrin	30	6	23+4	4	3+0	2
18	FW	(Canada) CAN	Julian Altobelli	31	15	23+5	11	3+0	4
19	FW	(Canada) CAN	Shola Jimoh	25	0	7+16	0	0+2	0
35	FW	(Canada) CAN	Kemari Record-Wright	1	0	0+1	0	0+0	0
38	FW	(Cambodia) CAM	David Chhoeun	1	0	0+1	0	0+0	0

=== Top scorers ===
Rank	Nat.	Player	Pos.	Canadian Premier League	Canadian Championship	TOTAL
1	(Canada)	Julian Altobelli	FW	11	4	15
2	(Canada)	Shaan Hundal	FW	9	0	9
3	(Canada)	Massimo Ferrin	FW	4	2	6
4	(Lebanon)	Gabriel Bitar	MF	5	0	5
4	(Canada)	Adonijah Reid	FW	4	1	5
5	(Canada)	Riley Ferrazzo	DF	3	0	3
5	(Mexico)	Leonel López	FW	3	0	3
5	(Trinidad and Tobago)	Steffen Yeates	MF	3	0	3
6	(Canada)	Luca Accettola	MF	2	0	2
6	(Canada)	Max Ferrari	MF	1	1	2
7	(Mexico)	Orlando Botello	FW	1	0	1
7	(Canada)	Kembo Kibato	MF	1	0	1
7	(Portugal)	Bryan Rosa	FW	0	1	1
7	(Canada)	Frank Sturing	DF	1	0	1
Totals				46	9	55

Updated to match played October 26, 2025
Source: Canadian Premier League

=== Top assists ===
Rank	Nat.	Player	Pos.	Canadian Premier League	Canadian Championship	TOTAL
1	(Mexico)	Orlando Botello	DF	4	1	5
1	(Canada)	Max Ferrari	MF	5	0	5
1	(Canada)	Massimo Ferrin	FW	3	2	5
1	(Canada)	Adonijah Reid	FW	4	1	5
2	(Canada)	Shola Jimoh	FW	4	0	4
3	(Canada)	Julian Altobelli	FW	3	0	3
3	(Canada)	Shaan Hundal	FW	2	1	3
4	(Lebanon)	Gabriel Bitar	MF	2	0	2
4	(Canada)	Kembo Kibato	MF	1	1	2
4	(Mexico)	Oswaldo León	DF	1	1	2
4	(Canada)	Steffen Yeates	MF	0	2	2
5	(Canada)	Elijah Adekugbe	MF	1	0	1
5	(Canada)	Riley Ferrazzo	DF	1	0	1
5	(Canada)	Luke Singh	DF	1	0	1
Totals				32	9	41

Updated to match played October 26, 2025
Source: Canadian Premier League

=== Clean sheets ===
Rank	Nat.	Player	Canadian Premier League	Canadian Championship	TOTAL
1	(Mexico)	Diego Urtiaga	7	1	8
2	(Canada)	Ivan Pavela	2	0	2
Totals			9	1	10

Updated to match played October 26, 2025
Source: Canadian Premier League

=== Disciplinary record ===
No.	Pos.	Nat.	Player	Canadian Premier League		Canadian Championship		TOTAL	
No.	Pos.	Nat.	Player	Yellow card	Red card	Yellow card	Red card	Yellow card	Red card
1	GK	(Mexico)	Diego Urtiaga	2	0	0	0	2	0
3	DF	(Trinidad and Tobago)	Luke Singh	7	0	0	0	7	0
4	DF	(Mexico)	Oswaldo León	7	1	0	0	7	1
5	DF	(Canada)	Frank Sturing	6	0	0	0	6	0
6	MF	(Mexico)	Orlando Botello	7	0	0	0	7	0
7	MF	(Canada)	Steffen Yeates	3	0	1	0	4	0
8	MF	(Canada)	Elijah Adekugbe	5	0	0	1	5	1
9	MF	(Canada)	Shaan Hundal	2	0	1	0	3	0
9	MF	(Portugal)	Bryan Rosa	1	0	0	0	1	0
10	MF	(Canada)	Adonijah Reid	7	0	0	0	7	0
11	FW	(Canada)	Massimo Ferrin	2	0	0	0	2	0
12	GK	(Canada)	Ivan Pavela	0	0	1	0	1	0
16	MF	(Canada)	Max Ferrari	7	0	0	0	7	0
17	MF	(Mexico)	Leonel López	3	0	0	0	3	0
18	FW	(Canada)	Julian Altobelli	4	0	1	0	5	0
19	FW	(Canada)	Shola Jimoh	6	0	0	0	6	0
20	MF	(Lebanon)	Gabriel Bitar	7	0	0	0	7	0
21	MF	(Canada)	Kembo Kibato	8	0	1	0	9	0
23	DF	(Canada)	Riley Ferrazzo	7	0	2	0	9	0
28	MF	(Canada)	Jesse Costa	2	0	0	0	2	0
30	MF	(Canada)	Christian Zeppieri	1	0	0	0	1	0
34	MF	(El Salvador)	Anthony Umanzor	1	0	0	0	1	0
62	DF	(Canada)	Nyal Higgins	3	0	0	0	3	0
Totals				97	1	7	1	104	2

Updated to match played October 26, 2025
Source: Canadian Premier League
