= List of Estonian football transfers summer 2022 =

This is a list of Estonian football transfers in the 2022 summer transfer window by club.

This transfer window was open during the 2022 Meistriliiga season.

== Meistriliiga ==
=== FCI Levadia ===
In:

No.	Pos.	Nation	Player
—	FW	(Australia) AUS	Aamir Yunis Abdallah (loan return from Vaprus)
—	DF	(Mali) MLI	Bourama Fomba (from (Belarus) Minsk)
—	DF	(Estonia) EST	Anton Krutogolov (loan return from Vaprus) →
—	GK	(Estonia) EST	Georg Mattias Lagus (loan from Nõmme United)
—	DF	(Serbia) SRB	Luka Luković (loan return from Vaprus) →
—	MF	(Slovenia) SVN	Til Mavretič (from (Slovenia) Tabor Sežana)
—	FW	(Tajikistan) TJK	Rustam Soirov (from (Tajikistan) Istiklol)

Out:

No.	Pos.	Nation	Player
36	MF	(Estonia) EST	Mihkel Ainsalu (to (Netherlands) Telstar)
19	FW	(Ukraine) UKR	Oleksiy Khoblenko (loan return to (Ukraine) Kryvbas Kryvyi Rih)
—	DF	(Estonia) EST	Anton Krutogolov (career break)
7	FW	(Estonia) EST	Frank Liivak (to (Republic of Ireland) Sligo Rovers)
—	DF	(Serbia) SRB	Luka Luković (mutual consent)
30	GK	(Estonia) EST	Daniil Pareiko (to (Italy) SPAL academy)
70	MF	(Serbia) SRB	Marko Putinčanin (mutual consent)
45	MF	(Ukraine) UKR	Artem Schedryi (loan return to (Ukraine) Kryvbas Kryvyi Rih)
—	FW	(Russia) RUS	Daniil Timofejev (loan to Tallinna Kalev)
59	FW	(Estonia) EST	Bogdan Vaštšuk (to (Poland) Stal Mielec)

=== Flora ===
In:

No.	Pos.	Nation	Player
—	DF	(Estonia) EST	Mihhail Kolobov (from TJK Legion)
—	MF	(Estonia) EST	Vladislav Kreida (loan return from (Sweden) Skövde AIK)
—	GK	(Estonia) EST	Kristen Lapa (loan return from FC Kuressaare)

Out:

No.	Pos.	Nation	Player
38	FW	(Estonia) EST	Andreas Kiivit (loan to Pärnu Vaprus)
29	FW	(Estonia) EST	Tristan Koskor (to (Cyprus) Peyia 2014)
1	GK	(Estonia) EST	Ingmar Krister Paplavskis (loan to FC Kuressaare)
15	DF	(Estonia) EST	Joonas Tamm (loan return to (Ukraine) Vorskla Poltava)
16	DF	(Estonia) EST	Erko Jonne Tõugjas (loan to TJK Legion)

=== Paide Linnameeskond ===
In:

No.	Pos.	Nation	Player
—	FW	(Uganda) UGA	Edrisa Lubega (loan return from (Portugal) Estrela Amadora)
—	MF	(The Gambia) GAM	Foday Darboe (from (The Gambia) Real de Banjul)
—	FW	(Estonia) EST	Sten Viidas (from (Portugal) Vitória S.C. U19)

Out:

No.	Pos.	Nation	Player
31	FW	(Netherlands) NED	Deabeas Owusu-Sekyere (to (China) Cangzhou Mighty Lions)
27	FW	(The Gambia) GAM	Ebrima Singhateh (to (Czech Republic) Slavia Prague)
80	MF	(Estonia) EST	Kevor Palumets (to (Belgium) Zulte Waregem)

=== Nõmme Kalju ===
In:

No.	Pos.	Nation	Player
—	MF	(Austria) AUT	Daniel Sudar (from (Greece) Pierikos)
—	FW	(Liberia) LBR	William Jebor

Out:

No.	Pos.	Nation	Player
26	DF	(Ukraine) UKR	Andriy Markovych (end of contract)
16	DF	(Russia) RUS	Daniil Shevyakov (loan to Tallinna Kalev)
18	MF	(Brazil) BRA	Welves (loan return to (Ukraine) FC Lviv)

=== Tallinna Legion ===
In:

No.	Pos.	Nation	Player
—	FW	(Estonia) EST	Daniil Tarassenkov
—	DF	(Estonia) EST	Erko Jonne Tõugjas (loan from Flora)

Out:

No.	Pos.	Nation	Player
23	DF	(Estonia) EST	Mihhail Kolobov (to Flora)

=== Narva Trans ===
In:

No.	Pos.	Nation	Player
—	MF	(Germany) GER	Cem Felek
—	DF	(Estonia) EST	Aleksandr Kulinitš
—	DF	(Ukraine) UKR	Denys Taraduda (from (Ukraine) VPK-Ahro Shevchenkivka)

Out:

No.	Pos.	Nation	Player
42	DF	(Canada) CAN	Ryan Lindsay

=== Kuressaare ===
In:

No.	Pos.	Nation	Player
—	GK	(Estonia) EST	Ingmar Krister Paplavskis (loan from Flora)

Out:

No.	Pos.	Nation	Player
16	DF	(Estonia) EST	Tristan Teeväli (loan to Tallinna Kalev)
77	GK	(Estonia) EST	Kristen Lapa (loan return to Flora)

=== Tartu Tammeka ===
In:

No.	Pos.	Nation	Player
—	GK	(Estonia) EST	Richard Aland (from Tartu Kalev)

Out:

No.	Pos.	Nation	Player
7	FW	(Estonia) EST	Martin Jõgi (end of professional career)

=== Pärnu Vaprus ===
In:

No.	Pos.	Nation	Player
—	DF	(Estonia) EST	Siim Aer (loan from Paide Linnameeskond U21)
—	FW	(Estonia) EST	Andreas Kiivit (loan from Flora)
—	DF	(Estonia) EST	Kevin Metso (loan from Paide Linnameeskond U21)

Out:

No.	Pos.	Nation	Player
—	FW	(Australia) AUS	Aamir Yunis Abdallah (loan return to Levadia)
—	DF	(Estonia) EST	Anton Krutogolov (loan return to Levadia)
—	DF	(Serbia) SRB	Luka Luković (loan return to Levadia)

=== Tallinna Kalev ===
In:

No.	Pos.	Nation	Player
—	MF	(Estonia) EST	Kristofer Käit (loan return from (Portugal) FC Porto) →
—	DF	(Russia) RUS	Daniil Shevyakov (loan from Nõmme Kalju)
—	DF	(Estonia) EST	Tristan Teeväli (loan from Kuressaare)
—	FW	(Russia) RUS	Daniil Timofejev (loan from FCI Levadia)

Out:

No.	Pos.	Nation	Player
3	DF	(Estonia) EST	Alexander Bergman (loan to Nõmme United)
—	MF	(Estonia) EST	Kristofer Käit (to (Portugal) Rio Ave)
