= Bryan Rosa =

Portuguese footballer (born 2002)

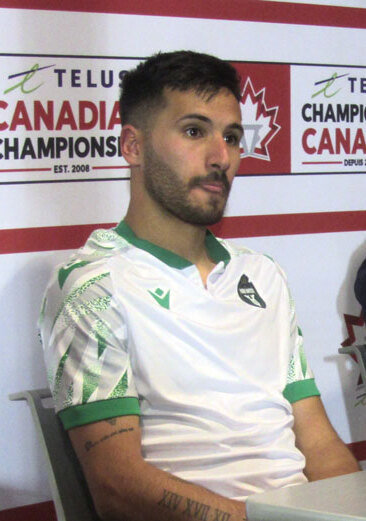
- Rosa in 2025

Personal information
- Full name: Bryan Alexandre Pereira Rosa
- Date of birth: 14 December 2002 (age 23)
- Place of birth: Northern Ireland
- Height: 1.84 m (6 ft 0 in)
- Position: Forward

Team information
- Current team: Peniche

Youth career
- 2011–2020: União de Leiria
- 2020: Tondela
- 2020–2021: União de Leiria

Senior career*
Years	Team	Apps	(Gls)
2020	União de Leiria	4	(0)
2020–2021	União de Leiria B	8	(5)
2021	União de Leiria	1	(0)
2021–2022	Peniche	12	(0)
2022	Peniche B	3	(2)
2022–2023	Pombal	27	(18)
2023	Dumiense/CJPII	2	(0)
2023–2025	Pombal	44	(18)
2025	York United FC	5	(0)
2025–2026	Anadia	20	(1)
2026–	Peniche	0	(0)
- * Club domestic league appearances and goals as of 28 July 2026

Bryan Alexandre Pereira Rosa (born 14 December 2002) is a Portuguese professional footballer who plays for Campeonato de Portugal club Peniche.

== Early life ==
Rosa was born in Northern Ireland, but grew up in Portugal. He began playing youth football with União de Leiria at age nine. In May 2020, he joined the youth system of Tondela, before returning to Leiria soon after.

== Career ==
In January 2020, Rosa began playing with União de Leiria at the senior level in the third tier Campeonato de Portugal. After a brief stint with youth system of Tondela, he returned to União de Leiria.

In 2021, he signed with Peniche in the now fourth tier Campeonato de Portugal.

In 2022, despite interest from Guiense, he signed with Pombal in the fifth tier AF Leiria Divisão Honra.

In July 2023, Rosa signed with Dumiense/CJPII in the Campeonato de Portugal.

In November 2023, he returned to Pombal in the fifth tier AF Leiria Divisão Honra (the club earned promotion to the fourth tier Campeonato de Portugal for the following season).

In April 2025, he signed with Canadian Premier League club York United FC. He made his debut for the club on 27 April 2025, in a substitute appearance against Forge FC. He scored his first goal for the club on 6 May 2025, in a 2025 Canadian Championship match against FC Laval. In June 2025, Rosa and the club agreed to a mutual termination of the remainder of his contract.

In July 2025, he returned to Portugal to sign with Campeonato de Portugal club Anadia.

== Career statistics ==
As of 6 June 2025

Appearances and goals by club, season and competition
Club	Season	League			National cup		League cup		Other		Total	
Club	Season	Division	Apps	Goals	Apps	Goals	Apps	Goals	Apps	Goals	Apps	Goals
União de Leiria	2019–20	Campeonato de Portugal	4	0	0	0	–		–		4	0
União de Leiria B	2020–21	AF Leiria 1ª Divisão	8	5	–		–		–		8	5
União de Leiria	2020–21	Campeonato de Portugal	1	0	0	0	–		–		1	0
Peniche	2021–22	Campeonato de Portugal	12	0	1	0	–		–		13	0
Peniche B	2021–22	AF Leiria 1ª Divisão	3	2	–		–		–		3	2
Pombal	2022–23	AF Leiria Divisão Honra	27	18	3	1	5	4	1	1	36	24
Dumiense/CJPII	2023–24	Campeonato de Portugal	2	0	1	0	–		–		3	0
Pombal	2023–24	AF Leiria Divisão Honra	21	10	–		4	2	1	0	26	12
Pombal	2024–25	Campeonato de Portugal	23	8	2	2	–		–		25	10
Pombal	Total		44	18	2	2	4	2	1	0	51	22
York United FC	2025	Canadian Premier League	5	0	1	1	–		–		6	1
Career total			106	43	8	4	9	6	2	1	125	54
