= Antonio Campos (soccer) =

Canadian soccer player (born 2006)

Personal information
- Full name: Kai Antonio Campos Ralston
- Date of birth: 25 July 2006 (age 20)
- Place of birth: Red Deer, Alberta, Canada
- Height: 1.85 m (6 ft 1 in)
- Position: Goalkeeper

Team information
- Current team: Inter Toronto
- Number: 17

Youth career
- –2025: Ventura County Fusion

College career
Years	Team	Apps	(Gls)
2025–	Cal State Fullerton Titans	0	(0)

Senior career*
Years	Team	Apps	(Gls)
2025–2026	Ventura County Fusion	0	(0)
2026–	Inter Toronto	10	(0)
- * Club domestic league appearances and goals as of October 31, 2026

Antonio Campos (born 25 July 2006) is a Canadian professional soccer player who plays for Canadian Premier League club Inter Toronto.

== Personal life and early career ==
Campos is the son of Canadian Marcy Ralston and Jorge Campos, a Mexican international who represented the country in two FIFA World Cups. He was born in Red Deer, Alberta and grew up in the Pacific Palisades area of Los Angeles. As a student at Loyola High School, the young Campos played both basketball and soccer. He eventually chose to focus on soccer while training with his father during the COVID-19 pandemic.

== Club career ==
As a youth, Campos played for the academy of the USL League Two's Ventura County Fusion. He was part of the first-team squad that competed against AV Alta FC in the First Round of the 2025 U.S. Open Cup. However he did not see any minutes in the match.

In 2025, Campos committed to playing college soccer for the Cal State Fullerton Titans of the NCAA Division I. He did not see any minutes during his freshman season, mostly serving as an understudy to the older and more experienced goalkeepers on the squad.

In February 2026, it was announced that Campos had signed a four-year deal with Inter Toronto FC of the Canadian Premier League. He had previously trained with the club in 2024, impressing the coaching staff. The deal was the player's first professional contract.

== International career ==
Campos holds multiple citizenships and is eligible to represent Canada, Mexico, and the United States internationally.

== Career statistics ==
As of September 13, 2026

Club	Season	League			Playoffs		Domestic Cup		Continental		Total	
Club	Season	Division	Apps	Goals	Apps	Goals	Apps	Goals	Apps	Goals	Apps	Goals
Inter Toronto FC	2026	Canadian Premier League	3	0	0	0	0	0	0	0	3	0
Career total			3	0	0	0	0	0	0	0	3	0
