= Cameron DaSilva =

Canadian soccer player

Personal information
- Date of birth: December 19, 2002 (age 23)
- Place of birth: Bowmanville, Ontario, Canada
- Height: 1.90 m (6 ft 3 in)
- Position: Defender

Team information
- Current team: York United

Youth career
- Darlington SC
- Ajax FC
- Toronto FC

Senior career*
Years	Team	Apps	(Gls)
2023–2024	Simcoe County Rovers FC	35	(6)
2025	York United	4	(0)
2025	→ York United FC Academy (loan)	7	(1)
2026–	International FC	1	(0)

International career^{‡}
2017	Canada U15	5	(1)
- * Club domestic league appearances and goals as of May 23, 2026 ‡ National team caps and goals as of August 13, 2017

Cameron DaSilva (born December 19, 2002) is a Canadian soccer player who plays for International FC in the Ontario Premier League.

== Early life ==
DaSilva played youth soccer with Ajax FC and Darlington SC. In 2014, he joined the Toronto FC Academy at age 11.

== Club career ==
In 2023, DaSilva began playing with Simcoe County Rovers FC in League1 Ontario. In 2024, he was named an Honourable Mention on the league's year-end All-Star teams.

In January 2025, he signed a professional contract for the 2025 season with York United FC of the Canadian Premier League, with options for 2026 and 2027, after having spent some time training with the club the previous season.

== International career ==
In August 2017, DaSilva was called up to the Canada U15 team for the 2017 CONCACAF Boys' Under-15 Championship.

== Career statistics ==
As of October 28, 2025

Club	Season	League			Playoffs		Domestic Cup		League Cup		Total	
Club	Season	Division	Apps	Goals	Apps	Goals	Apps	Goals	Apps	Goals	Apps	Goals
Simcoe County Rovers FC	2023	League1 Ontario	18	2	2	0	–		–		20	2
Simcoe County Rovers FC	2024	League1 Ontario Premier	17	4	–		1	0	3	0	21	4
Simcoe County Rovers FC	Total		35	6	2	0	1	0	3	0	41	6
York United FC	2025	Canadian Premier League	4	0	1	0	1	0	–		6	0
York United FC Academy	2025	League1 Ontario Championship	7	1	–		–		0	0	7	1
Career total			46	7	3	0	2	0	3	0	52	7
