= Kemari Record-Wright =

Canadian soccer player (born 2008)

Personal information
- Full name: Kemari Record-Wright
- Date of birth: May 14, 2008 (age 18)
- Place of birth: Scarborough, Ontario, Canada
- Height: 1.80 m (5 ft 11 in)
- Position: Right back

Team information
- Current team: Inter Toronto FC
- Number: 35

Youth career
- Unionville Milliken SC
- Toronto FC Academy
- 2025-: Inter Toronto Pathway (Note: York United FC Academy changed its name to Inter Toronto Pathway in 2026)

Senior career*
Years	Team	Apps	(Gls)
2025-	Inter Toronto Pathway	16	(0)
2025-	Inter Toronto FC (Note: York United FC changed its name to Inter Toronto FC in 2026)	1	(0)

International career^{‡}
2024	Canada U15	3	(0)
- * Club domestic league appearances and goals as of October 18, 2025 ‡ National team caps and goals as of August 10, 2023

Kemari Record-Wright (born May 14, 2008) is a Canadian soccer player who plays as a right back for Inter Toronto FC of the Canadian Premier League.

== Career and personal life ==
Record-Wright starting playing soccer at 5 years old, and played for Unionville Milliken SC and the Toronto FC Academy at a youth level. Before switching to right back, Record-Wright played as a forward.

He is the cousin of Canadian professional soccer goalkeeper Triston Henry. He is a Chelsea FC supporter.

=== York United ===
After attending open tryouts, Record-Wright played for the York United FC Academy for most of the 2025 League1 Ontario Championship season.

Record-Wright went on to play for Team Ontario at the 2025 Canada Summer Games in St. John's, Newfoundland and Labrador.

On 5 September 2025, Record-Wright signed a development contract with York United and made his professional debut in a 3–1 win against Cavalry FC.

== International career ==
Record-Wright represented Canada's U15 national team at the 2023 CONCACAF Boys' Under-15 Championship, and made three appearances.
