= Jesse Costa =

Canadian soccer player (born 2005)

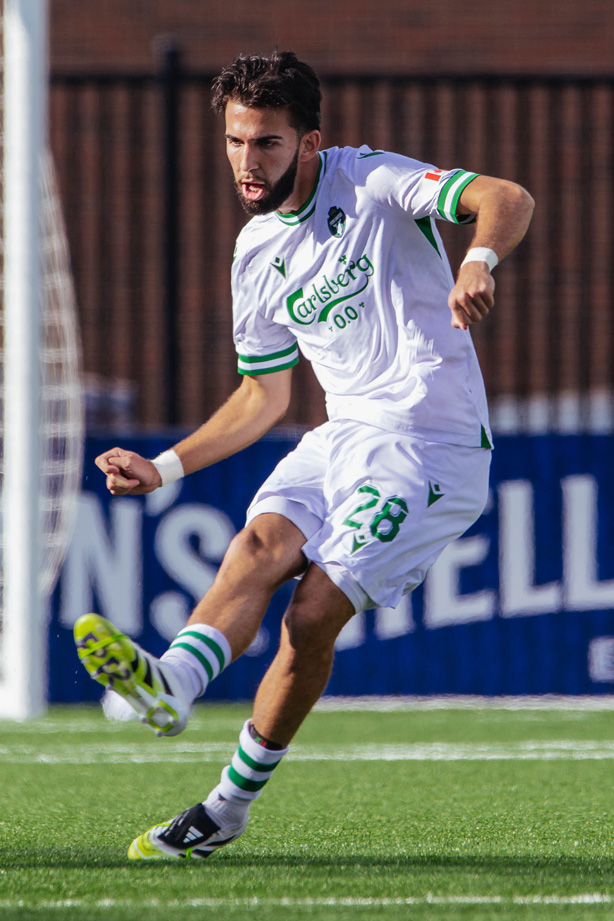
- Costa in 2025

Personal information
- Full name: Jessé Nicolás Costa
- Date of birth: April 28, 2005 (age 21)
- Place of birth: Brampton, Ontario, Canada
- Height: 1.84 m (6 ft 0 in)
- Position: Midfielder

Team information
- Current team: Inter Toronto FC
- Number: 28

Youth career
- Brampton YSC
- –2021: ProStars FC
- 2021–2024: VfL Wolfsburg
- 2024–2025: Corinthians

Senior career*
Years	Team	Apps	(Gls)
2025–	Inter Toronto FC (Note: York United FC changed its name to Inter Toronto FC in 2026)	11	(0)

International career^{‡}
2023	Portugal U18	2	(1)
2022–2024	Canada U20	11	(1)
- * Club domestic league appearances and goals as of October 31, 2026 ‡ National team caps and goals as of July 31, 2024

Jessé Nicolás Costa (born April 28, 2005) is a Canadian professional soccer player who plays as a midfielder for Canadian Premier League club Inter Toronto FC. Born in Canada, he has represented Portugal and Canada internationally at youth level.

== Early life ==
Costa was three years old when he started playing soccer with Brampton YSC.

As a youth player, Costa joined the youth academy of Canadian side ProStars FC and trialed for Hungarian side Puskás Akadémia FC and Portuguese side Sporting CP. In 2021, he joined the youth academy of German Bundesliga side VfL Wolfsburg, where he played in the Premier League International Cup. Three years later, he joined the youth academy of Brazilian side Sport Club Corinthians Paulista.

== Club career ==
On August 15, 2025, York United announced that the club had signed the Canadian midfielder on a contract through the end of the 2026 season, with a club option for 2027.

== International career ==
Costa has represented Portugal and Canada internationally at youth level. In April 2022, Costa debuted in the Canada Soccer program, attending a camp with the Canada U20 team. He was named to the Canada squad for the 2022 CONCACAF U-20 Championship.

During the summer of 2023, he played for the Portugal national under-18 football team the at the 2023 Torneio Internacional de Lisboa.

He then returned to the Canada men's national under-20 soccer team for the 2024 CONCACAF U-20 Championship.

== Career statistics ==
As of October 27, 2025

Club	Season	League			Playoffs		Domestic Cup		League Cup		Total	
Club	Season	Division	Apps	Goals	Apps	Goals	Apps	Goals	Apps	Goals	Apps	Goals
Inter Toronto FC	2025	Canadian Premier League	4	0	1	0	0	0	–		5	0
Career total			4	0	1	0	0	0	0	0	5	0
