= Sebastián Gonzales =

Peruvian footballer (born 2005)

- Gonzales in 2026

Personal information
- Full name: Sebastián Gonzales Zela
- Date of birth: 6 December 1999 (age 26)
- Place of birth: Lima, Peru
- Height: 1.86 m (6 ft 1 in)
- Position: Forward

Team information
- Current team: Inter Toronto

Youth career
- Sporting Cristal

Senior career*
Years	Team	Apps	(Gls)
2018–2019	Sport Boys	23	(2)
2020–2023	Alianza Lima	8	(0)
2020	→ San Martín (loan)	20	(3)
2022	→ Ayacucho (loan)	20	(2)
2023	→ Coopsol (loan)	26	(7)
2024–2025	Comerciantes Unidos	45	(11)
2025	Teuta	12	(0)
2026–	Inter Toronto	2	(1)

International career^{‡}
2018–2019	Peru U20	5	(0)
2019–2020	Peru U23	8	(1)
- * Club domestic league appearances and goals as of 17 May 2026 ‡ National team caps and goals as of 1 February 2020

Sebastián Gonzales Zela (born 6 December 1999) is a Peruvian professional footballer who plays as a forward for Inter Toronto.

== Club career ==
Gonzales started his career with Peruvian side Sport Boys, where he made twenty-three league appearances and scored two goals. Ahead of the 2020 season, he signed for Alianza Lima, where he made eight league appearances and scored one goal and helped the club win the league title.

Following his stint there, he signed for Albanian side Teuta in 2025, where he made twelve league appearances and scored zero goals. Six months later, he signed for Canadian side Inter Toronto.

== International career ==
Gonzales is a Peru youth international. During January 2019, he played for the Peru national under-20 football team at the 2019 South American U-20 Championship.

== Style of play ==
Gonzales plays as a forward. Peruvian newspaper La República wrote in 2025 that he "possesses the physique of a classic number nine".
