= Chimaobim Onyeocha =

Canadian soccer player (born 2010

Personal information
- Date of birth: June 4, 2010 (age 16)
- Place of birth: Timmins, Ontario, Canada
- Height: 6 ft 1 in (1.85 m)
- Position: Forward

Team information
- Current team: Inter Toronto FC

Youth career
- Whitby FC
- Inter Toronto FC

Senior career*
Years	Team	Apps	(Gls)
2026–	Inter Toronto III	7	(1)
2026–	Inter Toronto II	17	(5)
2026–	Inter Toronto	4	(0)

International career^{‡}
2026	Canada U16		
- * Club domestic league appearances and goals as of October 14, 2026 ‡ National team caps and goals as of October 14, 2026

Chimaobim Onyeocha (born June 4, 2010) is a Canadian soccer player who plays as a forward for Inter Toronto FC in the Canadian Premier League. He is the youngest player to appear in a match for Inter Toronto FC.

== Early life ==
Onyeocha was born in Timmins, Ontario, before moving to Whitby, Ontario at age four.

== Club career ==
In April 2026, at the age of 15 years and 10 months old, he signed a developmental and a professional contract with Inter Toronto FC of the Canadian Premier League through 2029, with an option for 2030. On July 4, 2026, at the age of 16 years and 30 days old, he made his professional debut for the first team, in a match against Vancouver FC, breaking the club record previously held by Shola Jimoh and becoming the second youngest player in league history (after T.J. Tahid).

== International career ==
Born in Canada, Onyeocha is of Nigerian descent and holds dual Canadian and Nigerian nationality. In August 2026, Onyeocha was called up to the Canada U16 team for a training camp and pair of friendlies.

== Career statistics ==
As of October 14, 2026

Club	Season	League			Playoffs		Domestic Cup		League Cup		Total	
Club	Season	Division	Apps	Goals	Apps	Goals	Apps	Goals	Apps	Goals	Apps	Goals
Inter Toronto FC III	2026	Ontario Premier League 3	7	1	–		–		–		7	1
Inter Toronto FC II	2026	Ontario Premier League 2	17	5	–		–		1	0	18	5
Inter Toronto FC	2026	Canadian Premier League	4	0	–		0	0	–		4	0
Career total			28	6	0	0	0	0	1	0	29	6
