= Orlando Botello =

Mexican footballer (born 2001)

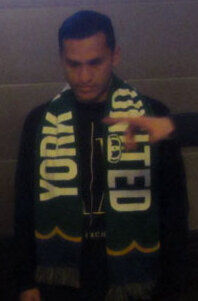
- Botello in 2024

Personal information
- Full name: Orlando Botello Linares
- Date of birth: 6 August 2001 (age 25)
- Place of birth: Ocotlán, Mexico
- Height: 1.71 m (5 ft 7 1/2 in)
- Position: Defender

Team information
- Current team: Atlético Morelia
- Number: 15

Youth career
- 2014–2020: Monarcas Morelia
- 2020–2021: Mazatlán

Senior career*
| Years | Team | Apps | (Gls) |
| 2021–2022 | Mazatlán | 0 | (0) |
| 2022 | → Cancún (loan) | 25 | (0) |
| 2023–2025 | Monterrey | 0 | (0) |
| 2023 | → Raya2 Expansión (loan) | 2 | (0) |
| 2024–2025 | → York United (loan) | 45 | (1) |
| 2026– | Atlético Morelia | 5 | (0) |
- * Club domestic league appearances and goals as of 21 September 2026

Orlando Botello Linares (born 6 August 2001) is a Mexican professional footballer who plays for Atlético Morelia in Liga de Expansión MX.

== Early life ==
Botello played youth football with Atlético Morelia. In 2021, he joined the youth system of Mazatlán. In 2023, after having appeared at the senior level with Cancún, he joined the U20 team of Monterrey.

== Club career ==
On 1 October 2019, he made his senior debut with Atlético Morelia, in a Copa MX match against Puebla.

In January 2022, Botello signed with Cancún in the second tier Liga de Expansión MX.

In January 2023, he joined Raya2 Expansión, the second team of Monterrey, while also playing for the youth sides. In February 2024, he was loaned to York United FC in the Canadian Premier League for the 2024 season. On 24 January 2025, York extended Botello's loan for the 2025 season. On June 14, 2025, he scored his first professional goal in a 3–1 victory over Pacific FC, subsequently earning CPL Team of the Week honours.

In January 2026, Botello joined Liga de Expansión MX side Atlético Morelia.

== International career ==
In October 2017, Botello was called up to a training camp with the Mexico U16 team. In January 2019, he was called up to a camp with the Mexico U18 team.
