= Frank Sturing =

Dutch-Canadian soccer player (born 1997)

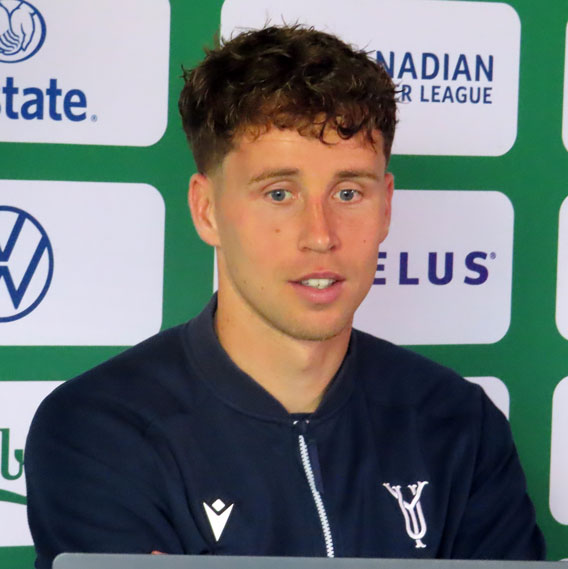
- Sturing in 2025

Personal information
- Date of birth: 29 May 1997 (age 29)
- Place of birth: Nijmegen, Netherlands
- Height: 1.85 m (6 ft 1 in)
- Position: Centre-back

Team information
- Current team: Inter Toronto FC

Youth career
- Oranje Blauw
- 2007–2016: NEC

Senior career*
Years	Team	Apps	(Gls)
2017–2020	NEC	43	(1)
2020–2021	Den Bosch	18	(0)
2021–2023	SV Horn	44	(2)
2024–	Inter Toronto FC (Note: York United FC changed its name to Inter Toronto FC in 2026)	52	(1)

International career^{‡}
2014	Netherlands U18	3	(0)
2015	Netherlands U19	1	(0)
2016	Netherlands U20	1	(0)
2021	Canada	2	(1)
- * Club domestic league appearances and goals as of October 31, 2026 ‡ National team caps and goals as of June 5, 2021

Frank Sturing (born May 29, 1997) is a professional soccer player who plays as a centre-back for Inter Toronto FC in the Canadian Premier League. Born in the Netherlands, he represents Canada at international level.

== Early life ==
Sturing began playing youth soccer in the Netherlands at age five with Oranje Blauw. He joined the youth academy of NEC at age 10.

== Club career ==
On 2 April 2017, Sturing made his senior debut for his debut for NEC in the Dutch Eredivisie against Vitesse. In February 2018, he signed an extension until June 2020 with an option for an additional year. At the end of the 2019–20 season, he departed the club, upon the expiry of his contract, after 13 years with the club.

In October 2020, Sturing joined Eerste Divisie side FC Den Bosch on an amateur basis.

In September 2021, Sturing signed with Austrian 2. Liga side SV Horn. In April 2022, he extended his contract for an additional season. He departed the club in June 2023.

In January 2024, he signed with Canadian Premier League club York United FC (later re-branded as Inter Toronto FC. Cavalry FC and Pacific FC had also been interested in signing him. He made his debut for York on April 26 against Vancouver FC. In January 2025, Sturing re-signed with York United FC for the 2025 season. In January 2026, he once again re-signed with the club for another season.

== International career ==
Sturing was born in the Netherlands to a Dutch mother and a Canadian father.

He played at the youth international level with the Netherlands U18, Netherlands U19, and Netherlands U20 teams.

In 2019, Sturing reached out to the Canadian Soccer Association to let them know he was eligible and interested in representing Canada at international level. In 2020, Sturing obtained his Canadian passport with the goal of representing Canada at the 2020 Olympic Games, despite never having been to Canada before. In March 2020, he was named to the provisional squad for the Canada U23 for their Olympic qualification matches. However, the 2020 qualifiers were postponed due to the COVID-19 pandemic. In January 2021, he was called up to a training camp with the Canada senior team for the first time. In March 2021, he was originally called up to the Canada U23 for their postponed Olympic qualifies, but was then named to the Canada senior team roster for World Cup qualifiers. On March 29, 2021, he made his senior international debut and scored his first goal in an 11–0 victory over the Cayman Islands in a 2022 World Cup qualification match. He made a second appearance against Aruba, but has not appeared since.

== Career statistics ==
=== Club ===
As of match played October 27, 2025

Appearances and goals by club, season and competition
Club	Season	League			Playoffs		National cup		Other		Total	
Club	Season	Division	Apps	Goals	Apps	Goals	Apps	Goals	Apps	Goals	Apps	Goals
NEC	2016–17	Eredivisie	3	0	—		0	0	0	0	3	0
NEC	2017–18	Eerste Divisie	19	1	—		2	0	1 (Note: Appearance in the Promotion playoffs)	1	22	2
NEC	2018–19	Eerste Divisie	7	0	—		1	0	0	0	8	0
NEC	2018–19	Eerste Divisie	14	0	—		1	0	—		15	0
NEC	Total		43	1	0	0	4	0	1	1	48	2
Den Bosch	2020–21	Eerste Divisie	18	0	—		1	0	—		19	0
SV Horn	2021–22	2. Liga	21	2	—		0	0	—		21	2
SV Horn	2022–23	2. Liga	23	0	—		3	0	—		26	0
SV Horn	Total		44	2	0	0	3	0	0	0	47	2
York United	2024	Canadian Premier League	17	0	2	0	1	0	—		20	0
York United	2025	Canadian Premier League	19	1	2	0	3	0	—		24	1
York United	Total		36	1	4	0	4	0	0	0	44	1
Career total			141	3	4	0	12	0	1	1	158	5

=== International ===
As of match played June 5, 2021

Appearances and goals by national team and year
National team	Year	Apps	Goals
Canada	2021	2	1
Total		2	1

==== International goals ====
Scores and results list Canada's goal tally first.

No	Date	Venue	Opponent	Score	Result	Competition
1.	29 March 2021	IMG Academy, Bradenton, United States	Cayman Islands	1–0	11–0	2022 FIFA World Cup qualification
