= Julian Altobelli =

Canadian soccer player (born 2002)

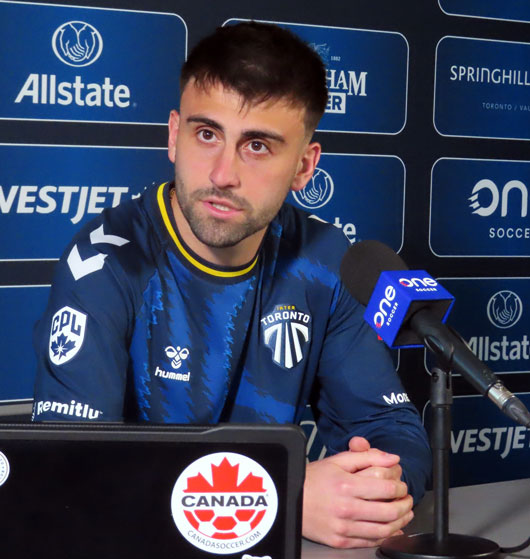
- Altobelli in 2026

Personal information
- Full name: Julian Anthony Altobelli
- Date of birth: November 4, 2002 (age 24)
- Place of birth: Toronto, Ontario, Canada
- Height: 1.78 m (5 ft 10 in)
- Positions: Midfielder; forward

Team information
- Current team: Inter Toronto FC (Note: York United FC changed its name to Inter Toronto FC in 2026)
- Number: 18

Youth career
- Bolton Wanderers SC
- Vaughan Azzurri
- Woodbridge Strikers
- 2014–2020: Toronto FC

Senior career*
Years	Team	Apps	(Gls)
2020	York9	0	(0)
2021–2024	Toronto FC II	92	(21)
2023	→ Toronto FC (loan)	0	(0)
2024	→ Toronto FC (loan)	0	(0)
2025–	Inter Toronto FC	42	(18)

International career^{‡}
2019	Canada U17	6	(0)
- * Club domestic league appearances and goals as of October 31, 2026 ‡ National team caps and goals as of October 6, 2020

Julian Anthony Altobelli (born November 4, 2002) is a Canadian professional soccer player who plays for Inter Toronto FC of the Canadian Premier League.

== Early life ==
Altobelli was born in Toronto and is of Italian descent, where his grandparents were born. He grew up in Bolton, Ontario, where he played for local club Bolton Wanderers SC. He later moved with his family to Vaughan, where he played for youth teams of Vaughan Azzurri and Woodbridge Strikers. He later joined the Toronto FC Academy in 2014.

== Club career ==
After posting a highlight reel on Instagram, he caught the attention of his future player agent, who informed him that Canadian Premier League club York9 was interested in him. After feeling the opportunities at Toronto FC lacking, he left the club's academy and signed with York9 on May 13, 2020, with options until 2023, becoming the club's youngest ever signing. After not making any appearances in the 2020 CPL season, which was shortened due to the COVID-19 pandemic, he requested and was granted his release from the club.

In December 2020, he returned to the TFC system, signing with Toronto FC II of USL League One for the 2021 season. He made his debut on May 26, coming on as a substitute against FC Tucson. He scored his first goal on June 19, against Fort Lauderdale CF.

In October 2023, he signed a short-term loan with the Toronto FC first team, ahead of their match against Charlotte FC. In March 2024, he re-signed with TFC2 for the 2024 season. He served as team captain for the 2024 season.

In 2024, he signed another three short-term loans with the first team. On July 14, 2024, he became the all-time appearance leader for Toronto FC II, with his 85th cap across all competitions. He was awarded the MLS Next Pro Goal of the Matchweek twice that season.

On September 15, 2024, he scored in his eighth consecutive match (the second longest streak in league history), netting his 20th goal for the club, tying him for the club all-time lead with Jordan Perruzza. Altobelli's contract expired following the 2024 season. He departed the club, having scored 21 goals in 94 appearances across all competitions.

In January 2025, Altobelli signed a one-year contract with an option for 2026 with his former club York United FC (previously York9) of the Canadian Premier League. On April 6, 2025, he scored a brace in his debut in a 2-0 victory over Vancouver FC.

== International career ==
Altobelli has represented the Canada U17 team at the 2019 CONCACAF U-17 Championship and the 2019 FIFA U-17 World Cup.

He scored in a penalty kick shootout victory against Costa Rica U17 in the quarter-finals of the CONCACAF tournament which qualified the team for the U17 World Cup.

== Career statistics ==
As of October 27, 2025

Club	Season	League			Playoffs		National Cup		Other		Total	
Club	Season	Division	Apps	Goals	Apps	Goals	Apps	Goals	Apps	Goals	Apps	Goals
York9	2020	Canadian Premier League	0	0	–		–		–		0	0
Toronto FC II	2021	USL League One	23	2	–		–		–		23	2
Toronto FC II	2022	MLS Next Pro	21	5	2	0	–		–		23	5
Toronto FC II	2023	MLS Next Pro	25	3	–		–		–		25	3
Toronto FC II	2024	MLS Next Pro	23	11	–		–		–		23	11
Toronto FC II	Total		92	21	2	0	0	0	0	0	94	21
Toronto FC (loan)	2023	Major League Soccer	0	0	–		0	0	0	0	0	0
Toronto FC (loan)	2024	Major League Soccer	0	0	–		0	0	0	0	0	0
Toronto FC (loan)	Total		0	0	0	0	0	0	0	0	0	0
Inter Toronto FC	2025	Canadian Premier League	26	10	2	1	3	4	–		32	15
Career total			118	31	4	1	3	4	0	0	126	36
