= Ariel Almagro =

Ecuadorian footballer (born 2001)

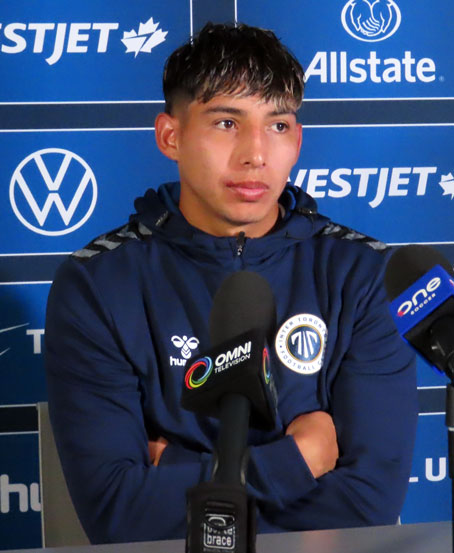
- Almagro in 2026

Personal information
- Full name: Jorge Ariel Almagro Albán
- Date of birth: 14 February 2001 (age 25)
- Place of birth: Quito, Ecuador
- Height: 1.71 m (5 ft 7 in)
- Position: Forward

Team information
- Current team: Inter Toronto FC

Youth career
- Universidad Católica
- 2019–2020: LDU Quito

Senior career*
Years	Team	Apps	(Gls)
2019	Norte América		
2019–2021	LDU Quito B		
2020	→ Atlético Kin (loan)		
2021–2022	América de Quito		
2022–2024	Cumbayá	50	(5)
2025	Aucas	26	(2)
2026–	Inter Toronto FC	31	(3)
- * Club domestic league appearances and goals as of 31 October 2026

Jorge Ariel Almagro Albán (born 14 February 2001) is an Ecuadorian professional footballer who plays for Inter Toronto FC in the Canadian Premier League.

== Club career ==
Early in his career, Almagro played football with Universidad Católica, Norte América, LDU Quito, Atlético Kin, and América de Quito.

In 2022, he joined Aucas.

In December 2024, he signed with Aucas in the LigaPro Serie A.

In January 2026, he signed a one-year contract with an option for 2027, with Canadian Premier League club Inter Toronto FC.
