= Steffen Yeates =

Trinidadian footballer (born 2000)

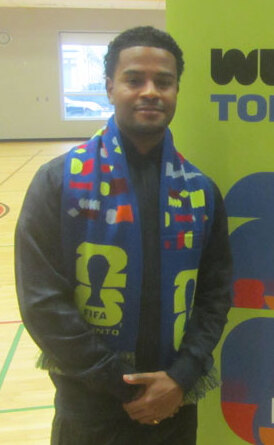
- Yeates in 2025

Personal information
- Date of birth: January 4, 2000 (age 26)
- Place of birth: Toronto, Ontario, Canada
- Height: 1.75 m (5 ft 9 in)
- Position: Midfielder

Team information
- Current team: Inter Toronto FC
- Number: 7

Youth career
- Vaughan SC
- 2013–2018: Toronto FC

College career
Years	Team	Apps	(Gls)
2018	Connecticut Huskies	17	(1)
2019	Oregon State Beavers	14	(2)

Senior career*
Years	Team	Apps	(Gls)
2016–2018	Toronto FC III	22	(2)
2018	Toronto FC II	4	(0)
2021–2022	Toronto FC II	42	(3)
2022	→ Toronto FC (loan)	2	(0)
2023–2024	Pacific FC	54	(2)
2025–	Inter Toronto FC (Note: York United FC changed its name to Inter Toronto FC in 2026)	43	(8)

International career^{‡}
2017	Canada U17	3	(0)
2018	Canada U20	1	(1)
2024–	Trinidad and Tobago	5	(1)
- * Club domestic league appearances and goals as of October 31, 2026 ‡ National team caps and goals as of March 21, 2025

Steffen Yeates (born January 4, 2000) is a professional footballer who plays as a midfielder for Canadian Premier League side Inter Toronto FC. Born in Canada, he represents Trinidad and Tobago at international level.

== Early life ==
Yeates began his youth career with Vaughan SC. In 2013, he joined the Toronto FC Academy.

== College career ==
In 2018, he attended the University of Connecticut, joining the men's soccer team. He scored his first goal against the University of Cincinnati.

In 2019, he transferred to Oregon State University and joined their men's soccer team. He scored his first goal on September 15 against the UC Santa Barbara Gauchos.

== Club career ==
=== Toronto FC ===
While with Toronto FC Academy, he debuted with Toronto FC III in League1 Ontario in 2016. He scored his first goal on June 19, 2016 against Durham United FA.

He made his professional debut with Toronto FC II in the USL on April 26, 2018 against the Richmond Kickers, as an academy call-up. In 2019, he was close to an agreement with Danish club FC Helsingør, but decided against it at the last minute. In 2020, he went on trial with French club US Boulogne. He signed his first professional contract with Toronto FC II on April 22, 2021 ahead of the 2021 season.

On May 4, 2022, he signed a short-term four-day loan with the first team, Toronto FC of Major League Soccer. He made his debut that same day, as a second half substitute, in their match against FC Cincinnati. He signed an additional four-day loan on May 7.

=== Pacific FC ===
In December 2022, Yeates signed a multi-year contract with Pacific FC of the Canadian Premier League, beginning in 2023. On September 14, 2023, he scored his first goal for the club in a 1-1 draw with Atlético Ottawa.

=== York United ===
In January 2025, he joined York United FC on a two-year contract with an option for an additional season, with Pacific receiving an undisclosed fee.

== International career ==
Yeates played for the Canada U17 team at the 2017 CONCACAF U-17 Championship in 2017, where he started in all three of the team's matches. In 2018, he was part of the Canada U20 team at the 2018 CONCACAF U-20 Championship where he scored a goal and an assist in his single appearance against Martinique.

In May 2024, he was named to a 39-man preliminary squad for the Trinidad and Tobago senior team ahead of their World Cup qualifying matches. He made his debut on June 8 in a 2026 FIFA World Cup qualification match against The Bahamas. He scored his first international goal on March 21, 2025, netting the winning goal in a 2-1 victory Cuba in a 2025 CONCACAF Gold Cup qualification match.

== Career statistics ==
As of October 23, 2024

Club	Season	League			Playoffs		Domestic Cup		League Cup		Continental		Total	
Club	Season	Division	Apps	Goals	Apps	Goals	Apps	Goals	Apps	Goals	Apps	Goals	Apps	Goals
Toronto FC III	2016	League1 Ontario	8	1	–		–		?	?	–		8	1
Toronto FC III	2017	League1 Ontario	8	0	–		–		?	?	–		8	0
Toronto FC III	2018	League1 Ontario	6	1	–		–		1+?	?	–		7	1
Toronto FC III	Total		22	2	0	0	0	0	1	?	0	0	23	2
Toronto FC II	2018	USL	4	0	–		–		–		–		4	0
Toronto FC II	2021	USL League One	20	0	–		–		–		–		20	0
Toronto FC II	2022	MLS Next Pro	22	3	2	0	–		–		–		24	3
Toronto FC II	Total		46	3	2	0	0	0	0	0	0	0	48	3
Toronto FC (loan)	2022	Major League Soccer	2	0	–		0	0	–		–		2	0
Pacific FC	2023	Canadian Premier League	28	1	1	0	3	0	–		–		32	1
Pacific FC	2024	Canadian Premier League	26	1	1	0	5	0	–		–		32	1
Pacific FC	Total		54	2	2	0	8	0	0	0	0	0	64	2
Inter Toronto FC	2023	Canadian Premier League	18	3	2	0	2	0	–		–		22	3
Career total			142	10	6	0	10	0	1	0	0	0	159	10
