= Max Ferrari (soccer) =

Canadian soccer player (born 2000)

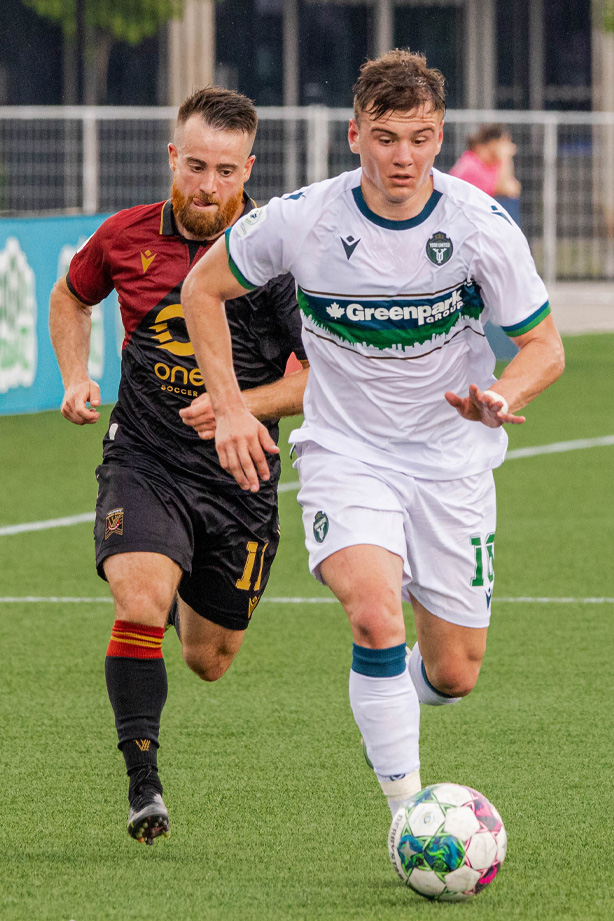
- Ferrari (right) with York United in 2022

Personal information
- Full name: Maximilian Ferrari
- Date of birth: August 20, 2000 (age 26)
- Place of birth: Newmarket, Ontario, Canada
- Height: 1.75 m (5 ft 9 in)
- Positions: Midfielder; full-back

Team information
- Current team: Inter Toronto FC
- Number: 16

Youth career
- Newmarket SC
- Richmond Hill SC
- ANB Futbol
- Aurora Youth SC

College career
Years	Team	Apps	(Gls)
2019	Humber Hawks	8	(2)

Senior career*
Years	Team	Apps	(Gls)
2017–2019	Aurora FC	37	(9)
2020–	Inter Toronto FC (Note: York United FC changed its name to Inter Toronto FC in 2026)	149	(4)
- * Club domestic league appearances and goals as of October 24, 2026

Maximilian Ferrari (born August 20, 2000) is a Canadian professional soccer player who plays for Inter Toronto FC of the Canadian Premier League. He plays as a midfielder and full-back.

== Early life ==
Ferrari grew up in Newmarket, Ontario. He is of Italian and German descent. He began playing youth soccer at age three or four with Newmarket SC. Afterwards, he played for Richmond Hill SC and ANB Futbol, before later moving to Aurora Youth SC. He also played hockey in his youth, winning two titles at the International Silver Stick hockey tournament.

== College career ==
In 2019, Ferrari attended Humber College where he played for he men's soccer team, winning the OCAA title. He scored his first goal on September 21, 2019, against the St. Clair Saints. He was named an OCAA West Division First-Team All-Star and was named the Humber College Coaches Pick.

== Club career ==
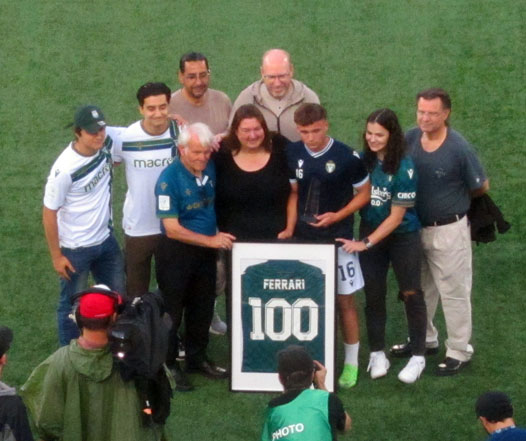
York United FC midfielder Max Ferrari with family receiving plaque for his 100th appearance for York United

From 2017 to 2019, Ferrari played with Aurora FC in League1 Ontario. On July 29, 2018, he scored two goals to lead Aurora to a 3–2 victory over North Mississauga SC. In November 2019, he was named to the CPL's U-21 Showcase Match for Team Ontario.

In February 2020, Ferrari signed his first professional contract with York9 (which became York United the following season) of the Canadian Premier League.

He made his debut on August 15, 2020, against Atlético Ottawa, recording an assist. In October 2020, he extended his contract through the end of 2022, with a club option for the 2023 season.

In August 2021, he further extended his contract through 2024. In September 2021, he was named the CPL Player of the Week. After scoring three goals and adding four assists in 30 appearances during the 2021 season, he was nominated for the CPL U21 Player of the Year Award, which was ultimately won by Alessandro Hojabrpour.

After the season, York United confirmed that they had received interest from various foreign clubs interested in signing Ferrari. After missing a large portion of the 2022 season due to injury, he returned to full health in 2023, often playing in a full-back role, rather than his usual winger role, as a result of injuries to other players on the squad.

On September 17, 2023, he captained the side for the first time, in his 77th appearance for the club, which made him the club's all-time appearance leader.

In December 2024, he extended his contract for the 2025 season, with an option for 2026. As of 2025, he is the club's longest-serving player, entering his sixth season with the club.

== Career statistics ==
As of October 27, 2025

Club statistics
Club	Season	League			Playoffs		National Cup		League Cup		Total	
Club	Season	Division	Apps	Goals	Apps	Goals	Apps	Goals	Apps	Goals	Apps	Goals
Aurora FC	2017	League1 Ontario	6	0	—		—		0	0	6	0
Aurora FC	2018	League1 Ontario	16	6	—		—		1	0	17	6
Aurora FC	2019	League1 Ontario	15	3	—		—		—		15	3
Aurora FC	Total		37	9	0	0	0	0	1	0	38	9
Inter Toronto FC	2020	Canadian Premier League	7	0	—		—		—		7	0
Inter Toronto FC	2021	Canadian Premier League	27	2	1	0	2	1	—		30	3
Inter Toronto FC	2022	Canadian Premier League	13	0	—		1	0	—		14	0
Inter Toronto FC	2023	Canadian Premier League	26	0	1	0	2	0	—		29	0
Inter Toronto FC	2024	Canadian Premier League	26	0	1	0	1	0	—		28	0
Inter Toronto FC	2025	Canadian Premier League	27	1	2	0	3	1	—		32	2
Inter Toronto FC	Total		126	3	5	0	9	2	0	0	140	5
Career total			163	12	5	0	9	2	1	0	178	14
