= Luca Accettola =

Canadian soccer player (born 2004)

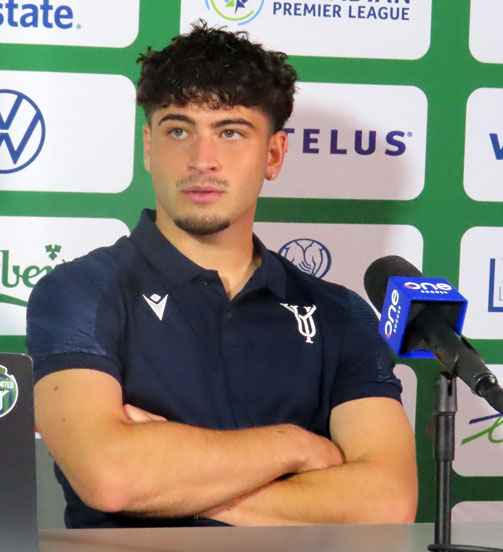
- Accettola in 2025

Personal information
- Date of birth: February 19, 2004 (age 22)
- Place of birth: Richmond Hill, Ontario, Canada
- Height: 5 ft 8 in (1.73 m)
- Position: Midfielder

Team information
- Current team: Inter Toronto FC
- Number: 32

Youth career
- 2007–2015: Vaughan Azzurri
- 2015–2022: Toronto FC

College career
Years	Team	Apps	(Gls)
2024	York Lions	17	(7)

Senior career*
Years	Team	Apps	(Gls)
2021	Toronto FC III	5	(3)
2022–2024	Toronto FC II	12	(1)
2024	→ Toronto FC III (loan)	4	(5)
2025–	Inter Toronto FC (Note: York United FC changed its name to Inter Toronto FC in 2026)	39	(5)
2025	→ York United FC Academy (loan)	5	(2)

International career^{‡}
2019	Canada U15	4	(0)
- * Club domestic league appearances and goals as of October 31, 2026 ‡ National team caps and goals as of August 10, 2019

Luca Accettola (born February 19, 2004) is a Canadian soccer player who plays for Inter Toronto FC in the Canadian Premier League.

== Early life ==
Accettola began playing youth soccer at age three with Vaughan Azzurri. In February 2015, he joined the Toronto FC Academy.

== University career ==
In 2024, Accettola began attending York University, where he played for the men's soccer team. He scored his first goal in his debut on August 30 against the McMaster Marauders.

In late September 2024, he was named the York University Male Athlete of the Week. In his rookie season, he recorded seven goals and added five assists.

At the end of his rookie season, he was named the OUA West Rookie of the Year and an OUA West First Team All-Star. He was also named the U Sports Rookie of the Year and selected to the U Sports All-Rookie Team.

== Club career ==
In 2021, he played with Toronto FC III in the League1 Ontario Summer Championship division.

Accettola began playing with Toronto FC II in MLS Next Pro in 2022 as an academy call-up, making his debut on April 3, 2022, against FC Cincinnati 2. He signed a professional contract with the team ahead of the 2023 season. He scored his first goal on August 3, 2024, against Chattanooga FC.

On August 22, 2024, he agreed to a mutual termination of his contract to allow him to attend York University. He also spent some time with the third team in the League1 Ontario Championship in 2024.

At the 2025 CPL–U Sports Draft, Accettola was selected in the first round (5th overall) by York United FC. In April 2025, he signed a U Sports contract with the club, which would allow him to keep his university eligibility. He made his debut in the team's second game of the season against HFX Wanderers FC.

On June 14, 2025, he scored his first goal in a 3-1 victory over Pacific FC. In July 2025, he signed a full professional contract with the club, giving up his university eligibility. After the 2025 season, he began training with Mexican club CF Monterrey.

== International career ==
In July 2019, he made his debut in the Canadian national program, attending a camp with the Canada U15 team. The next month he was named to the roster for the 2019 CONCACAF Boys' Under-15 Championship which took place at the IMG Academy in Brandenton, Florida.

== Career statistics ==
As of October 27, 2025

Club	Season	League			Playoffs		Domestic Cup		Other		Total	
Club	Season	Division	Apps	Goals	Apps	Goals	Apps	Goals	Apps	Goals	Apps	Goals
Toronto FC III	2021	League1 Ontario Summer Championship	5	3	–		–		–		5	3
Toronto FC II	2022	MLS Next Pro	6	0	0	0	–		–		6	0
Toronto FC II	2023	MLS Next Pro	1	0	–		–		–		1	0
Toronto FC II	2024	MLS Next Pro	5	1	–		–		–		5	1
Toronto FC II	Total		12	1	0	0	0	0	0	0	12	1
Toronto FC III (loan)	2024	League1 Ontario Championship	4	5	–		–		0	0	4	5
York United FC	2025	Canadian Premier League	13	2	2	0	1	0	–		16	2
York United FC Academy (loan)	2025	League1 Ontario Championship	5	2	–		–		0	0	5	2
Career total			39	13	2	0	1	0	0	0	42	13
