= Anthony Umanzor =

Canadian soccer player (born 2008)

Personal information
- Full name: Anthony Orlando Umanzor
- Date of birth: March 29, 2008 (age 18)
- Place of birth: Toronto, Ontario, Canada
- Height: 1.80 m (5 ft 11 in)
- Position: Midfielder

Team information
- Current team: Inter Toronto FC
- Number: 34

Youth career
- 2016–2020: Clarkson Soccer Club
- 2021-2024: Vaughan Azzurri
- 2024: Toronto FC Academy

Senior career*
Years	Team	Apps	(Gls)
2024-2025	Inter Toronto Pathway	14	(7)
2024–	Inter Toronto FC (Note: York United FC changed its name to Inter Toronto FC in 2026)	2	(0)

International career^{‡}
2024	Guatemala U17	2	(0)
2025	El Salvador U17	3	(0)
- * Club domestic league appearances and goals as of October 31, 2026 ‡ National team caps and goals as of November 10, 2025

Anthony Umanzor (born March 29, 2008) is a footballer player who plays as a midfielder for Inter Toronto FC of the Canadian Premier League. Born in Canada, he represents El Salvador and previously represented Guatemala at the youth level.

== Club career ==
Umanzor played on the youth clubs of Vaughan Azzurri and Toronto FC Academy. He played at the 2022 and 2024 Ontario Summer Games.

=== York United ===
In September 2024, Umanzor signed a development contract with York United FC after joining open tryouts. He would later play with the York United FC Academy for most of the 2025 League1 Ontario Championship season, where he captained the squad and won the academy player of the year.

Umanzor made his professional debut with York United coming off the bench away against Cavalry FC in a 2–1 loss on 8 June 2025. He would receive a yellow card two minutes into his debut.

Umanzor then went on to play for Team Ontario at the 2025 Canada Summer Games in St. John's, Newfoundland and Labrador.

On 15 October 2025, Umanzor signed an Exceptional Young Talent Standard Player Contract with York United, to take effect on 1 January 2026, with club options for 2028 and 2029.

== International career ==
=== Guatemala ===
On 1 November 2024, Vaughan Azzurri announced Anthony Umanzor had been called up to the Guatemala U17 national team. He made an appearance against Costa Rica in a behind closed doors friendly on 24 November which ended 0–0.

=== El Salvador ===
On 29 October 2025, Umanzor was selected for the El Salvador squad in the 2025 FIFA U-17 World Cup. He made his debut against North Korea in El Salvador's opening match of the tournament on 4 November 2025, and he would go on to play every minute of the three games El Salvador played before being eliminated in the group stage.
