= Diego Urtiaga =

Mexican footballer (born 1998)

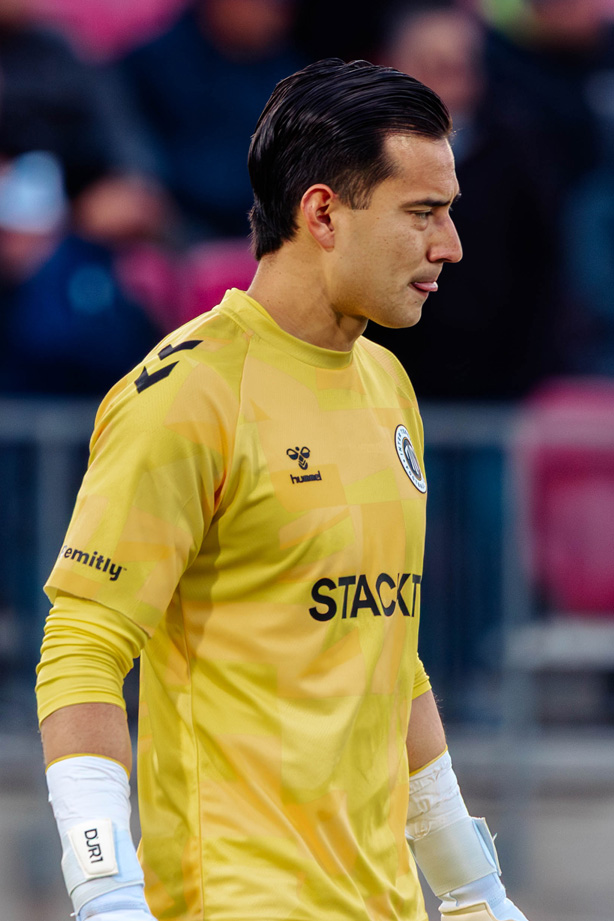
- Urtiage with Inter Toronto in 2026

Personal information
- Full name: Diego Urtiaga Ramírez
- Date of birth: 9 October 1998 (age 28)
- Place of birth: Puerto Vallarta, Mexico
- Height: 1.86 m (6 ft 1 in)
- Position: Goalkeeper

Youth career
- 2016–2018: Club Necaxa
- 2021–2024: Atlético San Luis

Senior career*
Years	Team	Apps	(Gls)
2014–2015	Tigres Blancos de Bengala	1	(0)
2015–2016	Cocúla	9	(0)
2018	Necaxa Premier	1	(0)
2019–2021	Atlético San Luis Premier	22	(0)
2020–2026	Atlético San Luis	10	(0)
2023	→ Tlaxcala (loan)	3	(0)
2025	→ York United (loan)	21	(0)
2026	→ Inter Toronto (Note: York United FC changed its name to Inter Toronto FC in 2026) (loan)	11	(0)
- * Club domestic league appearances and goals as of July 18, 2026

Diego Urtiaga Ramírez (born 9 October 1998) is a Mexican footballer who plays as a goalkeeper.

== Club career ==
Urtiaga began his career the fourth tier Tercera División de México with Club Colegio Albert Schweltzer Tigres Blancos de Bengala in 2014-15, before moving to Cocúla FC for 2015-16. He then joined Club Necaxa, where he played with Club Necaxa Premier in the third tier Serie A de México in 2017-18.

In 2019, he joined Atlético San Luis Premier in the third tier Liga Premier de México, where he made 22 appearances for the team.

In May 2021, Urtiaga was promoted to the Atlético de San Luis first team on a full-time basis, having occasional appeared as a substitute the prior year. In April 2022, he signed an eighteen month extension with the club.

In December 2022, he was loaned to Tlaxcala in the second tier Liga de Expansión MX for five months beginning in January. He made his debut for the club in July 2023, coming on as a substitute following an injury to starter Andrés Sánchez in a 2023 Leagues Cup match against the New England Revolution.

He made his Liga MX debut for Atlético de San Luis on 18 August 2023, in a match against Club Puebla. In September 2023, he signed an extension with the club through 2025.

In April 2025, he was loaned to Canadian Premier League club York United for the remainder of the year. He made his debut for the club on 19 April 2025 against Atlético Ottawa.

In April 2026, he returned to the side on a new loan until 17 July (with the club having since re-branded to Inter Toronto from York United).

== Honours ==
- Canadian Premier League Goalkeeper of the Month: May 2026
