= Ivan Pavela =

Canadian soccer player (born 2005)

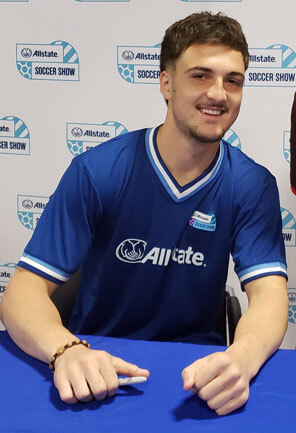
- Pavela in 2026

Personal information
- Full name: Ivan Josip Pavela
- Date of birth: March 3, 2005 (age 21)
- Place of birth: Toronto, Ontario, Canada
- Height: 1.94 m (6 ft 4 1/2 in)
- Position: Goalkeeper

Team information
- Current team: Inter Toronto FC
- Number: 12

Youth career
- ProStars FC
- 2021–2022: Puskás Akadémia
- 2023: Lokomotiva
- 2024: Hajduk Split

Senior career*
Years	Team	Apps	(Gls)
2021	ProStars FC	5	(0)
2022	ProStars FC	1	(0)
2023	York United FC	0	(0)
2023	→ ProStars FC (loan)	5	(0)
2024	NK Dugopolje	0	(0)
2025–	Inter Toronto FC (Note: York United FC changed its name to Inter Toronto FC in 2026)	14	(0)

International career^{‡}
2024	Canada U20	1	(0)
- * Club domestic league appearances and goals as of October 18, 2026 ‡ National team caps and goals as of May 12, 2025

Ivan Josip Pavela (born March 3, 2005) is a Canadian professional soccer player who plays as a goalkeeper for Inter Toronto FC in the Canadian Premier League.

== Early life ==
After playing with ProStars FC's senior team in 2021, he joined the U19 side of Hungarian club Puskás Akadémia, before returning to ProStars in 2022.

In 2023, he joined the U19 side of Croatian club NK Lokomotiva, followed by HNK Hajduk Split U19 in 2024. He spent a month with the Hajduk Split first team, following a pair of injuries to their goalkeepers.

== Club career ==
In 2021, Pavela played with ProStars FC in League1 Ontario. He returned to the team in 2022, following a stint in Hungary.

In April 2023, he signed a developmental contract with York United FC in the Canadian Premier League. He also played with ProStars FC that season.

In 2024, he signed with Croatian second tier side NK Dugopolje.

In February 2025, he signed a two-year contract with York United, with an option for 2026. He made his debut on April 6, 2025, in a 2–0 victory over Vancouver FC.

== International career ==
In February 2024, Pavela was called up to the Canada U20.
