= Alexander Bergman =

Polish-Estonian footballer (born 2004)

Personal information
- Full name: Alexander Kapitan Bergman
- Date of birth: 8 December 2004 (age 21)
- Place of birth: Warsaw, Poland
- Height: 1.87 m (6 ft 2 in)
- Position: Centre-back

Team information
- Current team: Inter Toronto FC
- Number: 2

Youth career
- –2020: Tallinna Kalev

Senior career*
Years	Team	Apps	(Gls)
2020–2023	Tallinna Kalev II	53	(1)
2021–2023	Tallinna Kalev	11	(0)
2022–2023	→ Nõmme United (loan)	28	(3)
2024	Nõmme United	23	(1)
2024	Nõmme United II	8	(2)
2025–	Inter Toronto FC (Note: York United FC changed its name to Inter Toronto FC in 2026)	3	(0)
2025	→ York United FC Academy	2	(1)
2025	→ Harju JK Laagri (loan)	14	(0)
2026–	→ Inter Toronto II (Note: York United FC Academy changed its name to Inter Toronto Pathway in 2026)	1	(0)

International career
2018	Estonia U15	3	(0)
2019	Estonia U16	2	(0)
2020	Estonia U17	2	(0)
2021	Estonia U18	1	(0)
2022	Estonia U19	5	(0)
- * Club domestic league appearances and goals as of January 1, 2026

Alexander Kapitan Bergman (born 8 December 2004) is a professional footballer who plays as a centre back for Canadian Premier League club Inter Toronto FC. Born in Poland, he represents Estonia at youth international level.

== Early life ==
Bergman played youth football with Tallinna Kalev. In October 2021, he went on trial with the U18 side of Italian club Hellas Verona. In February 2023, he went on trial with American teams Chicago Fire FC II and Union Omaha.

== Club career ==
Bergman began playing with JK Tallinna Kalev U21 in the Estonian third tier in 2020. He made his debut in the first tier Meistriliiga with them in 2022. In July 2022, he went on loan to Nõmme United in the second tier Esiliiga. In July 2023, he was once again loaned to Nõmme United. Ahead of the 2024 season, he signed with Nõmme United on a permanent basis. On May 4, 2024, he scored his first goal in the top tier in a 1–1 draw against Kuressaare.

In January 2025, he signed with Canadian Premier League club York United FC, on a one-year contract with options for 2026 and 2027. He also spent some time with their League1 Ontario championship side York United FC Academy. In July 2025, he was loaned to Harju JK Laagri of the Estonian Meistriliiga for the remainder of 2025.

== International career ==
Born in Poland, Bergman is also eligible to represent Estonia and Canada at international level.

Bergman has represented Estonia at international level from U15 to U19. In October 2025, he was called up to the Estonia U21.

== Career statistics ==
As of October 26, 2024

Appearances and goals by club, season and competition
Club	Season	League			Playoffs		Cup		Other		Total	
Club	Season	Division	Apps	Goals	Apps	Goals	Apps	Goals	Apps	Goals	Apps	Goals
Tallinna Kalev U21	2020	Esiliiga B	17	1	–		1	0	–		18	1
Tallinna Kalev U21	2021	Esiliiga B	17	0	–		0	0	–		17	0
Tallinna Kalev U21	2022	Esiliiga B	11	0	–		0	0	–		11	0
Tallinna Kalev U21	2023	Esiliiga B	8	0	–		0	0	–		8	0
Tallinna Kalev U21	Total		53	1	0	0	1	0	0	0	54	1
Tallinna Kalev	2021	Esiliiga	4	0	–		0	0	0	0	4	0
Tallinna Kalev	2022	Meistriliiga	7	0	–		1	0	–		8	0
Tallinna Kalev	2023	Meistriliiga	0	0	–		1	1	–		1	1
Tallinna Kalev	Total		11	0	0	0	2	1	0	0	12	1
Nõmme United (loan)	2022	Esiliiga	15	3	–		0	0	–		15	3
Nõmme United (loan)	2023	Esiliiga	13	0	–		0	0	–		13	0
Nõmme United	2024	Meistriliiga	23	1	–		2	0	–		25	1
Nõmme United	Total		51	4	0	0	2	0	0	0	53	4
Nõmme United U21	2024	II liiga	8	2	–		–		–		8	2
Career total			123	7	0	0	5	1	0	0	128	8

== Honours ==
Nõmme United

- Esiliiga: 2023
