= Inter Toronto FC =

Canadian professional soccer club based in Toronto

Inter Toronto
- Full name: Inter Toronto Football Club
- Nickname: The Nine Stripes
- Founded: May 5, 2018; 8 years ago (as York 9 Football Club)
- Stadium: York Lions Stadium; Toronto, Ontario
- Capacity: 4,000
- Owner: Game Plan Sports Group
- President: Ricardo Pasquel
- Head coach: Mauro Eustáquio
- League: Canadian Premier League
- 2026: Regular season: 6th Playoffs: Did not qualify
- Website: www.canpl.ca/intertoronto
| Home colours | Away colours |

Inter Toronto Football Club (formerly known as York United FC and York9 FC) is a Canadian professional soccer club based in Toronto, Ontario. The club competes in the Canadian Premier League and plays its home games at York Lions Stadium in Toronto.

== History ==
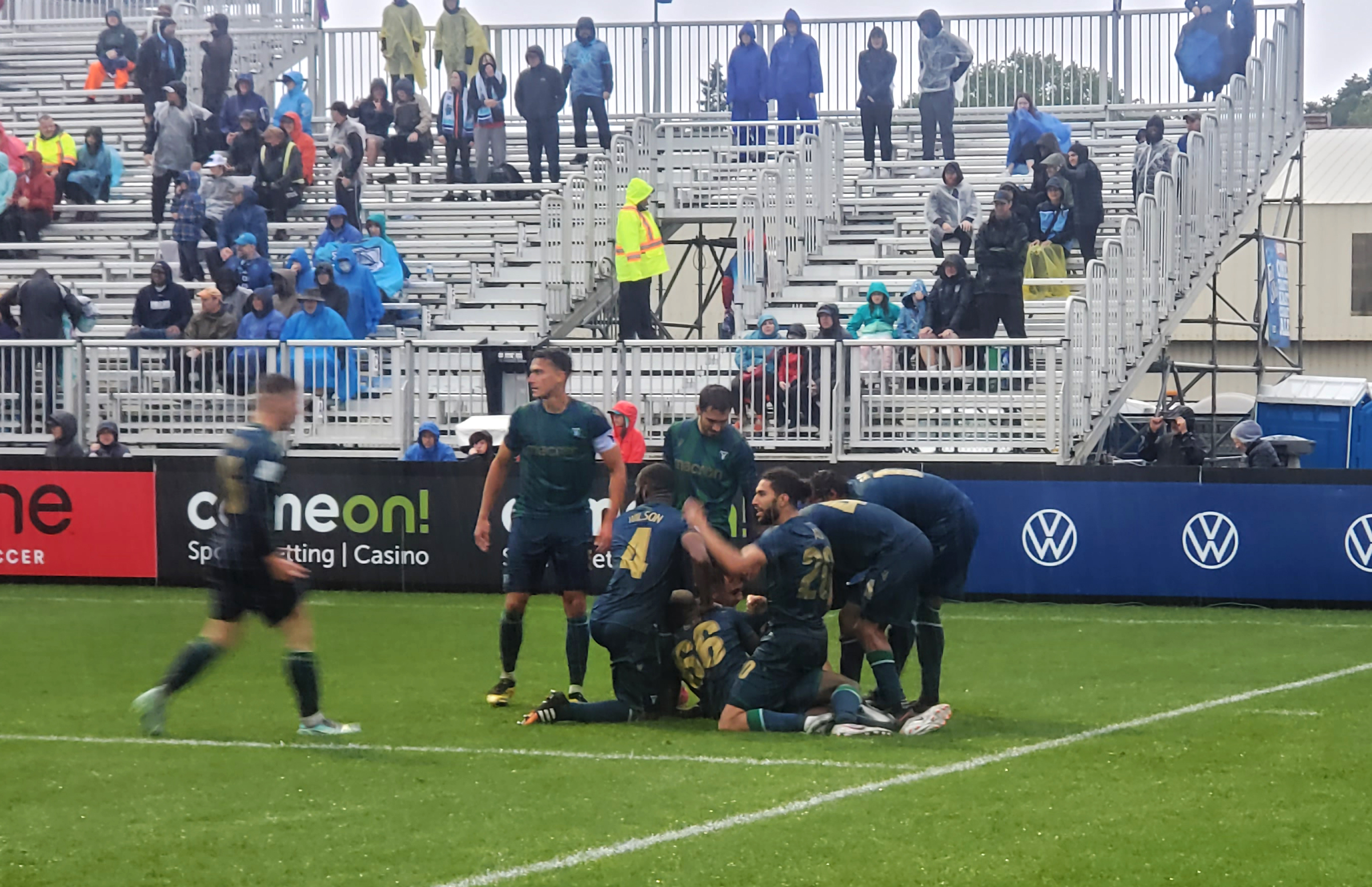
York United players celebrate a goal by Álvaro Rivero against HFX Wanderers during a game in September 2021.

In December 2017, former Canadian international Jimmy Brennan stepped down as executive director of Aurora FC and announced his intentions to take a role within the Canadian Premier League. In March 2018, it was revealed that Brennan had been named executive vice-president of York Sports & Entertainment back in January. The following day, it was revealed that the company's president Preben Ganzhorn named himself as president of an unknown entity called York9 FC, believed to be a Canadian Premier League franchise.

On May 5, 2018, York Region was one of four groups accepted by the Canadian Soccer Association for professional club membership. Greenpark Group, headed by Carlo Baldassarra, was revealed as the owner of York9, with his son Mike as the chairman. Both Brennan and Ganzhorn were pictured at the Annual Meeting of the Members when the group was announced.

York9 FC was officially unveiled on May 10, 2018, as the first team to join the Canadian Premier League. As well as confirming their place in the league for the 2019 launch season, the club also revealed their crest, colours, and branding. The club adopted the name York9 FC to represent the nine municipalities that make up York Region – Aurora, East Gwillimbury, Georgina, King, Markham, Newmarket, Richmond Hill, Vaughan, and Whitchurch-Stouffville. On July 27, 2018, York9 announced executive vice president of soccer operations Jimmy Brennan as the club's first head coach.

In August, York9 fielded a York Region Soccer Association Selects team to compete in the U17 International Soccer Cup held at York Lions Stadium. The team beat Juventus FC before losing to Toronto FC in the final.

=== York9 era ===
The inaugural "York9 FC" logo used during the club's first two seasons

The team has been called "Y9" and "The Nine Stripes" by the media and the league. York9's first match was the inaugural CPL match at Forge FC on April 27, 2019, launching the 905 Derby with a 1–1 draw, as Ryan Telfer scored the first goal in Canadian Premier League history.

To determine the Canadian Soccer Association's representative in the CONCACAF Champions League, York9 played in the 2019 Canadian Championship competing for the Voyageurs Cup. The team lost the quarterfinal to Montreal Impact after a 2–2 draw at home and a 1–0 loss at Montreal.

In early 2020, the team announced the departure of Preben Ganzhorn from the club. He was replaced by Angus McNab, initially as a management consultant and later as the team's President, GM, and CEO.

York9 was expected to begin their second season in the Canadian Premier League in April 2020 but the season was delayed by the COVID-19 pandemic. During the postponement, the club sold young midfielder Emilio Estevez to Dutch Eredivisie side ADO Den Haag, the first CPL player to be sold to a European top flight.

=== York United era ===
Logo used from 2021 through 2025

On December 11, 2020, the club was rebranded as York United FC, adopting a new crest and colour scheme with the name change. Although the original club name exclusively targeted York Region, the new branding also represents the City of Toronto. In their first season as York United FC, the club finished fourth in the 2021 Canadian Premier League season. They were eliminated from the playoffs after a 3–1 loss to Forge FC. Following the season, head coach Jim Brennan's tenure at the club ended after it was announced November 23, 2021, that his contract would not be extended. He was replaced by Martin Nash on December 21, 2021.

During the 2023 season, the club was sold from the Baldassarra family to the Canadian Soccer Business with plans to transfer the club to new ownership. Angus McNab stepped down from his role as president, CEO, and general manager following the season on November 3, 2023. On November 30, 2023, the Canadian Premier League announced that Mexican-based Game Plan Sports Group had purchased York United with immediate effect. The ownership group is led by brothers Eduardo, Ricardo, and Miguel Pasquel, who each took roles in the day-to-day operations of the club, respectively, as chief executive officer, president, and general manager, and chief commercial officer.

On May 21, 2024, manager Martin Nash was relieved of head-coaching duties and replaced by Mauro Eustáquio on an interim basis. On June 4, 2024, York United FC announced Benjamín Mora as their new head coach. At the end of the 2024 season, Benjamin Mora and the club mutually parted ways. On November 21, 2024, York United announced the appointment of Mauro Eustáquio as permanent head coach. At 31, Eustáquio became the youngest manager in Canadian Premier League history and the first former Canadian Premier League player to manage a CPL club.

In November 2024, the club announced the formation of the York United FC Academy to play in the League1 Ontario Championship, featuring a U20 roster (along with up to 3 U23 players), as well as being able to send up to three first-team players to the squad on short-term loans.

=== Inter Toronto era ===
On November 27, 2025, the club rebranded from York United FC to Inter Toronto FC. The club’s president, Ricardo Pasquel spoke on this, "Toronto is one of the most beautiful cities around the world and one of the most important cities. So we wanted to make a club that really identifies with where we are right now. It's a privilege to have the word Toronto in our name." As part of the rebrand, the club ownership is considering upgrading Lamport Stadium to make the 50-year-old venue its new home.

== Stadium ==
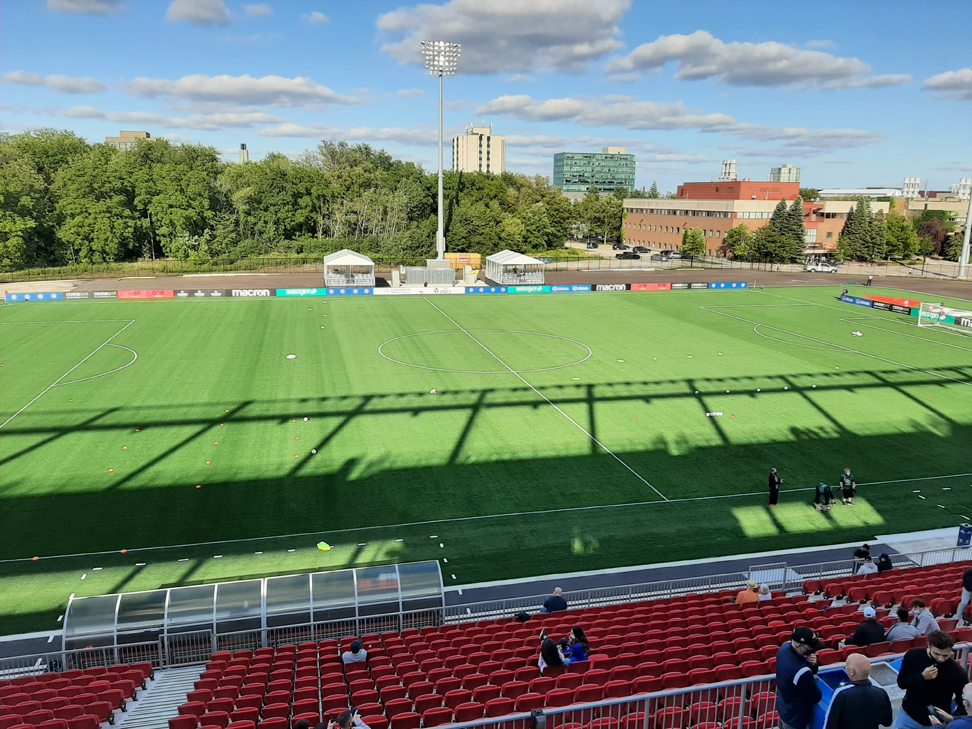
York Lions Stadium is a stadium at York University Heights used by Inter Toronto FC for home matches.

Inter Toronto FC plays its home matches at York Lions Stadium in York University's Keele Campus in York University Heights, a neighbourhood of North York, Toronto. Initially, the club had planned to use Alumni Field, on the same campus, while York Lions Stadium was being renovated for use at the end of the season. Before the start of the 2021 season, the stadium was renovated with a larger, artificial turf pitch and the removal of the athletic track which surrounded the playing surface.

In 2018, the club announced plans to build a modular, wooden, 15,000-seat stadium within the next three years. As of August 2021, financing and location of the new stadium was yet to be determined.

In March 2022, Woodbine Racetrack announced plans to add an 8,000 seat soccer-specific stadium and adjoining training facilities in the northeast corner of their property in Rexdale, Etobicoke; this would be the presumed new home of then-named York United and possibly house a future professional women's soccer club.

In November 2025, after rebranding to Inter Toronto FC, it was announced that the club ownership is also looking at moving to Lamport Stadium after investments and renovations.

== Crest and colours ==
After the rebrand to Inter Toronto FC, the club's colours include "Lake Ontario Blue, Trillium White, Sunrise Gold, and Tower Stone."

=== Former crest and colours ===
The club used its original branding while it was known as York9 FC, between 2018 and 2020. The main feature of the crest's design was nine beams at the top of the crest, one for each municipality in York Region. The upward angle of the bars is a nod to the region's motto "Ontario's Rising Star". A white trillium at the base of the crest recognized Ontario, the province's floral emblem since 1937.

The official club colours were light green, grey, and black (branded by the club as "electric green", "charcoal grey", and "black on black"). These colours symbolized the region's nature (in tandem with the club's environmental focus) and Black Creek.

The club's former namesake of York and crest pays homage to The Queen's York Rangers, as well as Toronto and York Region's predecessors, York, Upper Canada and York County. The crest's shape was derived from that of The Queen's York Rangers, a Canadian Army regiment based in Toronto and York Region. A blue element on top of the shield symbolized Lake Ontario, a body of water that rivers in York Region and Toronto flow into. The shield featured a YU monogram and nine vertical stripes, a nod to the club's nickname "The Nine Stripes". A crown at the top of the shield represented Canada's monarchical history. A trillium and a maple leaf were incorporated into the crown's design, with the former representing Ontario.

Although the club did insinuate that the crest of the original Town of York, that then became the City of Toronto, was used as inspiration, the club's colours of dark green, dark blue, white, and gold, were taken from the coat of arms of the City of York, a former city that was later amalgamated into the new City of Toronto in 1998. Unlike the majority of clubs in the CPL, York typically used home kits that were primarily white.

=== Kit suppliers and sponsors ===
| Period | Kit manufacturer | Front sponsor | Sleeve sponsor |
|---|---|---|---|
| 2019–2021 | Macron | Macron | None |
| 2022 | Macron | Greenpark Group | None |
| 2023–2024 | Macron | Carlsberg | CIBC |
| 2025 | Macron | Carlsberg | None |
| 2026– | Hummel | StackTV | Moneris (left); Remitly (right) |

== Club culture ==
Much more so than other CPL teams, Inter Toronto FC is a club which relies heavily on data and analytics to make decisions.

=== Supporters ===
A supporters' group called Generation IX was present at the club's launch event; the group later ended its support following the club's 2020 rebrand. Prior to the team's second season in 2020, two new supporters' groups formed: a student supporters' group based out of York University called The Green Lions and a female-led supporters' group called Dames of York.

Three new supporters' groups, Centre of the Universe, The Northern Corridor, and Eastenders 416, were formed in 2021.

=== Rivalries ===
Inter Toronto FC has a geographic rivalry with Forge FC in nearby Hamilton. The derby is named after the 905 area code which is used by Hamilton and York Region – the original home of Inter Toronto. On January 29, 2019, the Canadian Premier League announced that the inaugural match of the league was going to be a 905 Derby on April 27, 2019, in Hamilton. The match ended in a 1–1 draw.

== Players and staff ==
=== Roster ===
As of September 11, 2026

Note: Flags indicate national team as defined under FIFA eligibility rules; some limited exceptions apply. Players may hold more than one non-FIFA nationality.

| No. | Pos. | Nation | Player |
|---|---|---|---|
| 2 | DF | EST | Alexander Bergman |
| 3 | DF | TTO | Luke Singh |
| 4 | DF | MEX | Oswaldo León |
| 5 | DF | CAN | Frank Sturing |
| 6 | DF | MEX | Raúl López |
| 7 | MF | TTO | Steffen Yeates |
| 8 | DF | MEX | Carlos Guzmán |
| 9 | FW | PER | Sebastián Gonzales |
| 10 | MF | NIR | Ollie Bassett |
| 11 | FW | ECU | Ariel Almagro |
| 12 | GK | CAN | Ivan Pavela |
| 13 | MF | CAN | Luca Accettola |
| 16 | MF | CAN | Max Ferrari |
| 17 | GK | CAN | Kai Campos |

| No. | Pos. | Nation | Player |
|---|---|---|---|
| 18 | FW | CAN | Julian Altobelli |
| 19 | FW | CAN | Shola Jimoh |
| 20 | FW | LBN | Gabriel Bitar |
| 21 | MF | CAN | Kembo Kibato |
| 23 | DF | CAN | Juan Córdova |
| 24 | GK | CAN | Michael Williams |
| 28 | MF | CAN | Jesse Costa |
| 34 | MF | ESA | Anthony Umanzor |
| 35 | FW | CAN | Chimaobim Onyeocha |
| 36 | MF | VIN | Ty Clarke |
| 37 | DF | CAN | Nicolas Andrada |
| 38 | FW | CAN | David Peraza |
| 39 | FW | COD | Béni Badibanga |
| 77 | FW | CAN | Tomasz Skublak |

=== Out on loan ===
Note: Flags indicate national team as defined under FIFA eligibility rules; some limited exceptions apply. Players may hold more than one non-FIFA nationality.

| No. | Pos. | Nation | Player |

=== Staff ===
As of July 23, 2025

Executive
| Chief executive officer | Eduardo Pasquel |
| President | Ricardo Pasquel |
| Chief commercial officer | Miguel Pasquel |
| General manager | Jorge Villalpando |
Technical and coaching staff
| Head coach | Mauro Eustáquio |
| Assistant coach | José Guadalupe Cruz |
| Assistant coach | John Yacou |
| Goalkeeping coach | Karman Singh |
| Fitness coach | Marcos González |

=== Head coaches ===
As of Oct 26, 2025

| Coach | Nation | Tenure | Record | | | | |
| Coach | Nation | Tenure | G | W | D | L | Win % |
|---|---|---|---|---|---|---|---|
| Jimmy Brennan | Canada | July 27, 2018 – November 23, 2021 | 72 | 22 | 25 | 25 | 30.56 |
| Martin Nash | Canada | December 21, 2021 – May 21, 2024 | 67 | 25 | 13 | 29 | 37.31 |
| Mauro Eustáquio (interim) | Canada | May 21, 2024 – June 4, 2024 | 2 | 1 | 0 | 1 | 50.00 |
| Benjamín Mora | Mexico | June 4, 2024 – November 10, 2024 | 22 | 9 | 5 | 8 | 40.91 |
| Mauro Eustáquio | Canada | November 21, 2024 – present | 33 | 12 | 8 | 13 | 36.36 |

Statistics include regular season and Canadian Championship matches.

=== Club captains ===
| Years | Name | Nation |
|---|---|---|
| 2019–2020 | Manny Aparicio | Canada |
| 2021–2023 | Roger Thompson | Canada |
| 2024 | Molham Babouli | Syria |
| 2025 | Elijah Adekugbe | England |
| 2026–present | Oswaldo León | Mexico |

== Records ==
=== Year-by-year ===
| Season | League | | | | | | | | | | | | Playoffs | CC | Continental / other | Average attendance (Note: Average attendance include statistics from league matches only) | Top goalscorer(s) (Note: Top goalscorer(s) includes all goals scored in league season, league playoffs, Canadian Championship, CONCACAF League, and other competitive continental matches) | |
| Season | Div | League | Pld | W | D | L | GF | GA | GD | Pts | PPG | Pos. | Playoffs | CC | Continental / other | Average attendance | Name | Goals |
|---|---|---|---|---|---|---|---|---|---|---|---|---|---|---|---|---|---|---|
| **2019** (Note: Split season format was used with 10 games in spring season and 18 games in fall season) | 1 | CPL | 28 | 9 | 7 | 12 | 39 | 37 | +2 | 34 | 1.21 | 3rd | DNQ | R3 | Ineligible | 2,668 | (Chile) Rodrigo Gattas | 11 |
| **2020** (Note: Due to the COVID-19 Pandemic, the season was held in Charlottetown, Prince Edward Island, as a two stage round-robin season with a single match final) | 1 | CPL | 7 | 2 | 4 | 1 | 8 | 7 | +1 | 10 | 1.43 | 5th | DNQ | DNQ | DNQ | N/A | (Canada) Joseph Di Chiara | 3 |
| **2021** | 1 | CPL | 28 | 8 | 12 | 8 | 35 | 39 | -4 | 36 | 1.29 | 4th | SF | QF | DNQ | 1,118 | 3 players tied (Note: Diyaeddine Abzi, Álvaro Rivero, Lowell Wright) | 6 |
| **2022** | 1 | CPL | 28 | 9 | 7 | 12 | 31 | 37 | -6 | 34 | 1.21 | 6th | DNQ | SF | DNQ | 1,234 | (Guyana) Osaze De Rosario | 13 |
| **2023** | 1 | CPL | 28 | 11 | 5 | 12 | 35 | 44 | -9 | 38 | 1.36 | 5th | Play-in | QF | DNQ | 1,242 | (Syria) Molham Babouli | 7 |
| **2024** | 1 | CPL | 28 | 11 | 6 | 11 | 35 | 36 | -1 | 39 | 1.39 | 4th | QF | PR | DNQ | 1,499 | (Canada) Brian Wright | 9 |
| **2025** | 1 | CPL | 28 | 10 | 8 | 10 | 43 | 38 | +5 | 38 | 1.35 | 5th | QF | QF | DNQ | 2,055 (Note: Average includes Inter Toronto's CPL on Tour Match at Quebec City. Attendance was 7,218) | (Canada) Julian Altobelli | 14 |

=== All-time top scorers ===
As of October 26, 2025

| # | Name | Nation | Career at club | Goals scored | | | |
| # | Name | Nation | Career at club | CPL | Cup | Int'l | Total |
|---|---|---|---|---|---|---|---|
| 1 | Molham Babouli | Syria | 2022–2024 | 18 | 1 | 0 | 19 |
| 1 | Osaze De Rosario | Guyana | 2022–2023 | 18 | 1 | 0 | 19 |
| 3 | **Julian Altobelli** | Canada | 2020, 2025– | 11 | 4 | 0 | 15 |
| 4 | Rodrigo Gattas | Chile | 2019 | 9 | 2 | 0 | 11 |
| 4 | Brian Wright | Canada | 2023–2024 | 11 | 0 | 0 | 11 |
| 6 | Ryan Telfer | Trinidad and Tobago | 2019–2020 | 8 | 2 | 0 | 10 |
| 7 | Shaan Hundal | Canada | 2025 | 9 | 0 | 0 | 9 |
| 8 | Diyaeddine Abzi | Canada | 2019–2021 | 7 | 1 | 0 | 8 |
| 8 | Simon Adjei | Sweden | 2019 | 7 | 1 | 0 | 8 |
| 8 | Austin Ricci | Canada | 2019, 2022–2024 | 7 | 1 | 0 | 8 |

Note: Bold indicates active player

=== All-time top assists ===
As of October 26, 2025

| # | Name | Nation | Career at club | Assists | | | |
| # | Name | Nation | Career at club | CPL | Cup | Int'l | Total |
|---|---|---|---|---|---|---|---|
| 1 | **Max Ferrari** | Canada | 2020– | 12 | 0 | 0 | 12 |
| 2 | Diyaeddine Abzi | Canada | 2019–2021 | 8 | 1 | 0 | 9 |
| 3 | Brian Wright | Canada | 2023–2024 | 8 | 0 | 0 | 8 |
| 4 | Michael Petrasso | Canada | 2020–2023 | 5 | 2 | 0 | 7 |
| 4 | Kyle Porter | Canada | 2019–2020 | 5 | 2 | 0 | 7 |
| 6 | Molham Babouli | Syria | 2022–2024 | 6 | 0 | 0 | 6 |
| 7 | **Orlando Botello** | Mexico | 2025– | 4 | 1 | 0 | 5 |
| 7 | Osaze De Rosario | Guyana | 2022–2023 | 5 | 0 | 0 | 5 |
| 7 | **Massimo Ferrin** | Canada | 2025– | 3 | 2 | 0 | 5 |
| 7 | Jérémy Gagnon-Laparé | Canada | 2023 | 5 | 0 | 0 | 5 |
| 7 | **Shola Jimoh** | Canada | 2025– | 5 | 0 | 0 | 5 |
| 7 | Isaiah Johnston | Canada | 2020–2022 | 5 | 0 | 0 | 5 |
| 7 | Jorge Guzman | Mexico | 2024 | 5 | 0 | 0 | 5 |
| 7 | **Adonijah Reid** | Canada | 2025– | 4 | 1 | 0 | 5 |
| 7 | Noah Verhoeven | Canada | 2019 | 5 | 0 | 0 | 5 |
| 7 | Lowell Wright | Canada | 2020–2022 | 3 | 2 | 0 | 5 |

Note: Bold indicates active player

=== All-time most appearances ===
As of October 26, 2025

| # | Name | Nation | Career at club | Games played | | | |
| # | Name | Nation | Career at club | CPL | Cup | Int'l | Total |
|---|---|---|---|---|---|---|---|
| 1 | **Max Ferrari** | Canada | 2020– | 131 | 9 | 0 | 140 |
| 2 | Diyaeddine Abzi | Canada | 2019–2022 | 65 | 11 | 0 | 76 |
| 3 | **Elijah Adekugbe** | England | 2023– | 67 | 4 | 0 | 71 |
| 4 | Nathan Ingham | Canada | 2019–2021 | 54 | 8 | 0 | 62 |
| 5 | Roger Thompson | Canada | 2019–2023 | 56 | 4 | 0 | 60 |
| 5 | Austin Ricci | Canada | 2019, 2022–2024 | 54 | 6 | 0 | 60 |
| 7 | Chrisnovic N'sa | Canada | 2021–2022 | 54 | 5 | 0 | 59 |
| 8 | Dominick Zator | Canada | 2021–2022 | 53 | 5 | 0 | 58 |
| 9 | Osaze De Rosario | Guyana | 2022–2023 | 52 | 5 | 0 | 57 |
| 9 | Jordan Wilson | Canada | 2021–2022 | 52 | 5 | 0 | 57 |

Note: Bold indicates active player

=== Single-season records ===
As of Oct 26, 2025

| Record | Name | Statistic | Season |
|---|---|---|---|
| Goals (all competitions) | **Julian Altobelli** | 15 | 2025 |
| Goals (league matches) | Osaze De Rosario | 12 | 2022 |
| Assists (all competitions) | Michael Petrasso | 7 | 2021 |
| Assists (league matches) | Brian Wright | 6 | 2024 |
| Clean sheets (all competitions) | Nathan Ingham **Diego Urtiaga** | 8 | 2019 2025 |
| Clean sheets (league matches) | Thomas Vincensini **Diego Urtiaga** | 7 | 2024 2025 |

Note: Bold indicates active player

== Awards ==
=== Canadian Premier League Awards ===
| Year | Name | Award | Status |
|---|---|---|---|
| 2019 | Nathan Ingham | Golden Glove | Nominated |
| 2019 | Diyaeddine Abzi | Under 21 Canadian Player of the Year | Nominated |
| 2019 | Jimmy Brennan | Coach of the Year | Nominated |
| 2021 | Max Ferrari | Under 21 Canadian Player of the Year | Nominated |
| 2022 | Dominick Zator | Defender of the Year | Nominated |
| 2022 | Molham Babouli | Player's Player of the Year | Nominated |
| 2022 | Osaze De Rosario | Under 21 Canadian Player of the Year | Nominated |
| 2024 | Thomas Vincensini | Golden Glove | Nominated |
| 2024 | Brian Wright | Player's Player of the Year | Won |
| 2024 | Brian Wright | Player of the Year | Nominated |
| 2024 | Benjamín Mora | Coach of the Year | Nominated |
| 2024 | Noah Abatneh | Under 21 Canadian Player of the Year | Nominated |
| 2025 | Mauro Eustáquio | Coach of the Year | Nominated |
| 2025 | Julian Altobelli | Player's Player of the Year | Nominated |

=== Fan Voted Awards ===
| Year | Name | Award |
|---|---|---|
| 2019 | Morey Doner | Fan Voted Player of the Year |
| 2020 | Not awarded due to shortened season | |
| 2021 | Diyaeddine Abzi | Supporters Choice Player of the Year |
| 2021 | Max Ferrari | Supporters Choice U21 Player of the Year |
| 2022 | Niko Giantsopoulos | Supporters Choice Player of the Year |
| 2022 | Osaze De Rosario | Supporters Choice U21 Player of the Year |
| 2023 | Brem Soumaoro | Supporters Choice Player of the Year |
| 2024 | Brian Wright | Supporters Choice Player of the Year |
| 2025 | Julian Altobelli | Supporters Choice Player of the Year |
