= 2024 Canadian Premier League season =

Professional soccer league season

Canadian Premier League
- Season: 2024
- Dates: April 13 – October 19 (regular season); October 23 – November 9 (playoffs)
- Champions: Cavalry FC (1st title)
- CPL Shield: Forge FC (2nd shield)
- CONCACAF Champions Cup: Cavalry FC; Forge FC
- Matches: 112
- Goals: 285 (2.54 per match)
- Best player: Tristan Borges
- Top goalscorer: Tobias Warschewski (12 goals)
- Biggest home win: 3 goal difference (10 games) (Note: Vancouver 4–1 Valour (April 14) York United 3–0 Vancouver (April 26) Atlético Ottawa 3–0 Forge (May 25) Forge 3–0 York United (June 1) York United 4–1 Atlético Ottawa (July 26) Forge 3–0 HFX Wanderers (July 27) Forge 3–0 Atlético Ottawa (August 10) Pacific 3–0 HFX Wanderers (September 7) HFX Wanderers 3–0 Forge (September 14) Pacific 3–0 Vancouver (September 14))
- Biggest away win: Vancouver 0–4 HFX Wanderers (June 23)
- Highest scoring: Atlético Ottawa 4–3 Forge (June 28)
- Longest winning run: 5 matches Cavalry (July 26 – August 24)
- Longest unbeaten run: 10 matches Cavalry (April 20 – June 21)
- Longest winless run: 9 matches HFX Wanderers (April 13 – June 15)
- Longest losing run: 5 matches Valour (April 14 – May 10)
- Highest attendance: 7,395; Forge 2–1 Cavalry (April 13)
- Lowest attendance: 843; York United 3–0 Vancouver (April 26)
- Total attendance: 445,891
- Average attendance: 3,981

The 2024 Canadian Premier League season was the sixth season of the Canadian Premier League, the top men's professional level of the Canadian Soccer Association's league system. Forge FC were the defending champions, having beaten Cavalry FC, the CPL Shield winners, in the 2023 final.

Forge won the CPL Shield as regular season champions, their second CPL shield and sixth league trophy. In the 2024 CPL final, Cavalry won their first league title by defeating Forge 2–1 to claim the North Star Cup, their third league trophy.

== Team and rule changes ==
The same eight teams that competed in the 2023 season also competed in the 2024 season. The CPL's total player compensation budget was increased by $87,500 to a total of $1,112,500 (or $1,212,500 for teams maximizing the U21 salary incentive).

York United was bought by a new ownership group from Mexico, Game Plan Sports Group.

== Teams ==
Location of the 2024 Canadian Premier League teams

Club	Results	Location	Stadium	Capacity
Atlético Ottawa	details	Ottawa, Ontario	TD Place Stadium	24,000
Cavalry FC	details	Foothills County, Alberta	ATCO Field	6,000
Forge FC	details	Hamilton, Ontario	Tim Hortons Field	23,218
HFX Wanderers FC	details	Halifax, Nova Scotia	Wanderers Grounds	6,500
Pacific FC	details	Langford, British Columbia	Starlight Stadium	6,000
Valour FC	details	Winnipeg, Manitoba	Princess Auto Stadium	32,343
Vancouver FC	details	Langley, British Columbia	Willoughby Community Park	6,560
York United FC	details	Toronto, Ontario	York Lions Stadium	4,000

=== Personnel and sponsorship ===
Team	Head coach	Captain	Kit manufacturer	Shirt sponsor (chest)	Shirt sponsor (sleeve)
Atlético Ottawa	(Spain) Carlos González	(Canada) Maxim Tissot	Macron	Maple Lodge Farms	CIBC
Cavalry	(England) Tommy Wheeldon Jr.	(Canada) Marco Carducci	Macron	WestJet	CIBC
Forge	(Canada) Bobby Smyrniotis	(Canada) Kyle Bekker	Macron	Tim Hortons	CIBC
HFX Wanderers	(Canada) Patrice Gheisar	(Trinidad and Tobago) Andre Rampersad	Macron	Volkswagen	CIBC
Pacific	(Canada) James Merriman	(Wales) Josh Heard	Macron	Telus	CIBC
Valour	(Canada) Phillip Dos Santos	(Ghana) Raphael Ohin	Macron	OneSoccer	CIBC
Vancouver	(Iran) Afshin Ghotbi	(Canada) Callum Irving	Macron	CIBC	Carlsberg 0.0%
York United	(Mexico) Benjamín Mora	(Syria) Mo Babouli	Macron	Carlsberg 0.0%	CIBC

=== Number of teams by province or territory ===
Rank	Province or territory	Number	Teams
1	Ontario	3	Atlético Ottawa; Forge; York United
2	British Columbia	2	Pacific; Vancouver FC
3	Alberta	1	Cavalry
3	Manitoba	1	Valour
3	Nova Scotia	1	HFX Wanderers

=== Coaching changes ===
Team	Outgoing coach	Manner of departure	Date of vacancy	Position in table	Incoming coach	Date of appointment
York United	(Canada) Martin Nash	Fired	May 21, 2024	5th	(Mexico) Benjamín Mora	June 4, 2024

== Regular season ==
=== Format ===
The regular season was played as a quadruple round-robin, with each team playing the other seven teams twice at home and twice away between April and October. The regular season winner (the team ranked first after all 28 games) qualified for the 2025 CONCACAF Champions Cup and the top five teams qualified for the playoffs; the top two got byes to the semifinals.

=== Standings ===
Pos	Team	Pld	W	D	L	GF	GA	GD	Pts	Playoff qualification
1	Forge (S)	28	15	5	8	45	31	+14	50	First semifinal
2	Cavalry (C)	28	12	12	4	39	27	+12	48	First semifinal
3	Atlético Ottawa	28	11	11	6	42	31	+11	44	Quarterfinal
4	York United	28	11	6	11	35	36	−1	39	Play-in round
5	Pacific	28	9	7	12	27	32	−5	34	Play-in round
6	HFX Wanderers	28	7	9	12	37	43	−6	30 (Note: Head-to-head points: HFX Wanderers 7, Vancouver 4)	
7	Vancouver	28	7	9	12	29	43	−14	30	
8	Valour	28	7	7	14	31	42	−11	28	

Source: CanPL
Rules for classification: 1) Points; 2) Total number of wins; 3) Head-to-head; 4) Goal differential; 5) Goals for; 6) Away goals differential; 7) Away goals for; 8) Home goals differential; 9) Home goals for; 10) Fewest disciplinary points; 11) Most under-21 domestic player minutes; 12) Drawing of lots.
(C) Champion (qualified to Champions Cup Round one); (S) CPL Shield winner (qualified to Champions Cup Round one)

=== Results ===
Home \ Away	ATO	CAV	FOR	HFX	PAC	VAL	VFC	YRK
Atlético Ottawa		1–1	3–0	2–2	0–1	2–0	1–0	2–1
Atlético Ottawa		1–2	4–3	1–1	1–1	2–2	0–0	1–2
Cavalry	1–1		1–0	3–2	0–0	1–1	3–1	2–2
Cavalry	2–2		1–1	2–1	1–0	2–2	0–0	1–2
Forge	3–0	2–1		3–0	2–1	2–1	1–2	3–0
Forge	0–2	2–1		2–0	2–0	2–1	3–3	2–0
HFX Wanderers	1–3	1–1	2–2		0–0	1–2	3–2	2–1
HFX Wanderers	1–1	1–0	3–0		2–2	3–1	1–1	2–1
Pacific	0–1	1–1	0–0	1–0		2–0	1–2	2–0
Pacific	0–3	1–4	1–0	3–0		0–3	3–0	1–1
Valour	0–2	0–1	2–1	2–1	2–3		2–0	1–0
Valour	1–1	1–2	0–1	1–1	1–0		1–2	0–1
Vancouver	1–1	0–0	1–2	2–0	2–1	4–1		1–1
Vancouver	0–3	0–1	1–3	0–4	1–0	1–1		0–1
York United	4–1	1–2	0–3	2–1	2–0	3–1	3–0	
York United	1–0	0–2	0–0	2–1	1–2	1–1	2–2	

Source: CanPL.ca
Legend: Blue = home team win; Yellow = draw; Red = away team win.

=== Positions by matchweek ===
Team ╲ Week	1	2	3	4	5	6	7	8	9	10	11	12	13	14	15	16	17	18	19	20	21	22	23	24	25	26	27	28
Atlético Ottawa	3	4	2	1	1	1	1	1	1	1	1	1	1	1	1	1	1	2	2	2	2	2	2	2	2	3	3	3
Cavalry	5	5	6	5	6	6	6	6	5	6	6	6	6	6	6	4	4	4	4	3	3	4	4	3	3	2	2	2
Forge	2	2	1	3	3	4	4	3	3	4	2	3	5	5	3	3	3	3	1	1	1	1	1	1	1	1	1	1
HFX Wanderers	7	6	7	7	7	8	8	8	8	8	8	8	8	8	7	8	8	8	8	8	8	8	8	7	8	8	8	6
Pacific	4	3	3	2	2	2	3	4	4	2	4	5	4	4	5	6	6	6	7	7	7	6	6	5	5	6	5	5
Valour	8	8	8	8	8	7	7	7	7	7	7	7	7	7	8	7	7	7	6	6	6	7	7	8	7	7	7	8
Vancouver	1	1	4	4	4	3	2	2	2	3	5	2	3	3	4	5	5	5	5	5	5	5	5	6	6	5	6	7
York United	6	7	5	6	5	5	5	5	6	5	3	4	2	2	2	2	2	1	3	4	4	3	3	4	4	4	4	4

Source: CanPL As It Stands articles, CanPL standings
= Playoffs first semifinal; = Quarterfinal; = Play-in round

== Playoffs ==
The 2024 season used the Page playoff system. The team who finished first in the regular-season table played the team who finished second, with the winner hosting the final. The fourth- and fifth-placed teams played in a play-in round, and the winner then played the third-placed team in a quarterfinal. The quarterfinal winner then played the loser of the game between the first and second-placed teams for the other spot in the final.

In playoffs, if the scores were equal when normal playing time expires, extra time would be played for two periods of 15 minutes each. This would then be followed, if required, by a penalty shoot-out to determine the winners.

Forge FC and Atlético Ottawa were the first teams to qualify for the playoffs, doing so on September 21 and 22 respectively. After some initial confusion over Cavalry FC's qualification status and a "review of the league's playoff clinch scenarios," Cavalry officially qualified on September 28. York United FC became the fourth qualifier on October 1. With two matchweeks left in the season, all remaining teams were still able to qualify for the fifth playoff spot. This changed on October 12 when HFX Wanderers FC became the first team eliminated from playoff contention following a loss in the club's penultimate match. Pacific FC clinched the fifth and final playoff spot on the final day of the season.

On October 6, Forge clinched the CPL regular season title, winning the CPL Shield and securing the top playoff seed.

=== Bracket ===
Play-in round
October 23 – Toronto
4	York United	2
5	Pacific FC	0

First semifinal
October 27 – Hamilton
1	Forge FC	0
2	Cavalry FC	1
Quarterfinal
October 27 – Ottawa
3	Atlético Ottawa (p)	2 (5)
4	York United	2 (4)

Second semifinal
November 2 – Hamilton
1	Forge FC	1
3	Atlético Ottawa	0

Final
November 9 – Foothills County
2	Cavalry FC	2
1	Forge FC	1

=== Matches ===
==== Play-in round ====
October 23
7:30 pm EDT (UTC−4)

York United	2–0	Pacific FC
León 47'; Babouli 90+2'	Report

York Lions Stadium, Toronto
Attendance: 2,203
Referee: Mathieu Souaré

==== Quarterfinal ====
October 27
1:00 pm EDT (UTC−4)

Atlético Ottawa	2–2 (a.e.t.)	York United
Bassett 47'; del Campo 92' (pen.)	Report	Jimoh 90+4'; Babouli 94'
Penalties
Didić (penalty scored); Tissot (penalty scored); del Campo (penalty scored); Zapater (penalty scored); Iliadis (penalty scored)	5–4	(penalty scored) Córdova; (penalty missed) Babouli; (penalty scored) Wright; (penalty scored) Botello; (penalty scored) Martínez

TD Place Stadium, Ottawa
Attendance: 4,630
Referee: Marie-Soleil Beaudoin

==== First semifinal ====
October 27
4:00 pm EDT (UTC−4)

Forge FC	0–1	Cavalry FC
	Report	Warschewski 27'

Tim Hortons Field, Hamilton
Attendance: 6,521
Referee: Yusri Rudolf

==== Second semifinal ====
November 2
4:00 pm EDT (UTC−4)

Forge FC	1–0	Atlético Ottawa
Owolabi-Belewu 53'	Report

Tim Hortons Field, Hamilton
Attendance: 6,315
Referee: Michael Venne

==== Final ====
November 9
1:00 pm MST (UTC−7)

Cavalry FC	2–1	Forge FC
Warschewski 32' (pen.); Camargo 38'	Report	Achinioti-Jönsson 52'

ATCO Field, Foothills County
Attendance: 7,052
Referee: Renzo Villanueva

== Statistical leaders ==
=== Top scorers ===
Rank	Player	Club	Goals
1	(Germany) Tobias Warschewski	Cavalry	14
2	(Switzerland) Rubén del Campo	Atlético Ottawa	12
3	(Mexico) Alejandro Díaz	Vancouver	10
4	(Canada) Brian Wright	York United	9
5	(Canada) Tristan Borges	Forge	8
5	(New Zealand) Moses Dyer	Vancouver / Pacific	8
5	(Canada) Daniel Nimick	HFX Wanderers	8
5	(Canada) Kwasi Poku	Forge	8
9	(Syria) Mo Babouli	York United	7
9	(Canada) Shaan Hundal	Valour	7
9	(Australia) Jordan Swibel	Valour	7

=== Top assists ===
Rank	Player	Club	Assists
1	(Canada) Themi Antonoglou	Valour	7
1	(Canada) Kyle Bekker	Forge	7
3	(Canada) Tristan Borges	Forge	6
3	(Spain) Dani Morer	Atlético Ottawa	6
3	(Canada) Brian Wright	York United	6
6	(Canada) David Choinière	Forge	5
6	(Canada) Jordan Faria	Valour	5
6	(Mexico) Jorge Guzmán	York United	5
9	(Canada) Fraser Aird	Cavalry	4
9	(Northern Ireland) Ollie Bassett	Atlético Ottawa	4
9	(Canada) Clément Bayiha	York United / HFX Wanderers	4
9	(Canada) Sergio Camargo	Cavalry	4
9	(Canada) Paris Gee	Vancouver	4
9	(Somalia) Ali Musse	Cavalry	4
9	(Canada) Ballou Tabla	Atlético Ottawa	4

=== Clean sheets ===
Rank	Player	Club	Clean sheets
1	(Canada) Marco Carducci	Cavalry	9
2	(Czech Republic) Jassem Koleilat	Forge	8
3	(Canada) Emil Gazdov	Pacific	7
3	(Canada) Nathan Ingham	Atlético Ottawa	7
3	(France) Thomas Vincensini	York United	7

== Attendance ==
Pos	Team	Total	High	Low	Average	Change
1	HFX Wanderers	84,812	6,500	5,384	6,058	+3.5%
2	Atlético Ottawa	76,764	7,091	3,886	5,483	+10.6%
3	Forge FC	73,899	7,395	3,051	5,279	−0.7%
4	Cavalry FC	59,120	5,043	2,876	4,223	+3.3%
5	Vancouver FC	44,255	6,281	2,109	3,161	+13.4%
6	Valour FC	43,481	4,750	2,242	3,106	−3.5%
7	Pacific FC	42,574	4,367	2,161	3,041	−6.2%
8	York United	20,986	2,654	843	1,499	+20.7%
	League total	445,891	7,395	843	3,981	+3.7%

Source: CanPL, LeonardFC

== Awards ==
=== Canadian Premier League Awards ===
The 2024 Canadian Premier League Awards were held in Calgary, Alberta, on November 7, 2024.

Award	Recipient	Finalists	Ref.
Golden Boot	(Germany) Tobias Warschewski (Cavalry FC)	N/A	
Golden Glove	(Canada) Emil Gazdov (Pacific FC)	(Canada) Callum Irving (Vancouver FC) (France) Thomas Vincensini (York United FC)	
Coach of the Year	(Canada) Bobby Smyrniotis (Forge FC)	(Mexico) Benjamín Mora (York United FC) (Canada) Tommy Wheeldon Jr. (Cavalry FC)	
Player of the Year	(Canada) Tristan Borges (Forge FC)	(Canada) Kyle Bekker (Forge FC) (Canada) Alessandro Hojabrpour (Forge FC) (Germany) Tobias Warschewski (Cavalry FC) (Canada) Brian Wright (York United FC)	
Best Under 21 Canadian Player of the Year	(Canada) Kwasi Poku (Forge FC)	(Canada) Emil Gazdov (Pacific FC) (Canada) Noah Abatneh (York United FC)	
Defender of the Year	(Netherlands) Daan Klomp (Cavalry FC)	(Sweden) Alexander Achinioti-Jönsson (Forge FC) (Canada) Themi Antonoglou (Valour FC)	
Players' Player of the Year	(Canada) Brian Wright (York United FC)	N/A	

=== Canadian Premier League Best XI ===
Goalkeeper	Defenders	Midfielders	Forwards	Ref
(Canada) Gazdov (Pacific)	(Canada) Antonoglou (Valour); (Netherlands) Klomp (Cavalry); (Sweden) Achinioti-Jönsson (Forge); (Canada) Aird (Cavalry)	(Canada) Bekker (Forge); (Canada) Hojabrpour (Forge); (Canada) Borges (Forge)	(Germany) Warschewski (Cavalry); (Canada) Wright (York); (Somalia) Musse (Cavalry)	

=== Team of the Week ===
The Gatorade Team of the Week was selected by the CPL's Kristian Jack and OneSoccer's Oliver Platt.

Team of the Week
Week	Goalkeeper	Defenders	Midfielders	Forwards	Ref
1	(Canada) Gazdov (Pacific)	(Canada) Gee (Vancouver); (England) Owolabi-Belewu (Forge); (Canada) Meilleur-Giguère (Pacific); (Canada) Twardek (Ottawa)	(Canada) Borges (Forge); (Canada) Aparicio (Ottawa); (Belgium) Badibanga (Forge); (Lebanon) Bitar (Vancouver); (Netherlands) Sellouf (Pacific)	(Mexico) Díaz (Vancouver)	
2	(Canada) Kalongo (Forge)	(Mexico) Parra (Forge); (Canada) Romeo (Vancouver); (Canada) Didić (Ottawa); (Canada) Twardek (Ottawa)	(Canada) Borges (Forge); (Brazil) Garcia (Vancouver); (Canada) Young (Pacific); (Canada) Choinière (Forge)	(New Zealand) Dyer (Vancouver); (Trinidad and Tobago) Moore (Pacific)	
3	(Canada) Kalongo (Forge)	(Mexico) Parra (Forge); (Canada) Sturing (York); (Canada) Córdova (York)	(Canada) Antonoglou (Valour); (Canada) Aparicio (Ottawa); (Haiti) Toussaint (Pacific); (Canada) Tabla (Ottawa)	(Canada) Borges (Forge); (Canada) Wright (York); (Northern Ireland) Bassett (Ottawa)	
4	(Canada) Ingham (Ottawa)	(France) Kamdem (Cavalry); (France) Ndom (Pacific); (Canada) Didić (Ottawa); (Canada) Aird (Cavalry)	(Canada) Trafford (Cavalry); (Haiti) Toussaint (Pacific); (Canada) Yeates (Pacific)	(Switzerland) del Campo (Ottawa); (Trinidad and Tobago) Moore (Pacific); (Germany) Warschewski (Cavalry)	
5	(Canada) Irving (Vancouver)	(Mexico) Parra (Forge); (Sweden) Achinioti-Jönsson (Forge); (Canada) Nimick (HFX); (Canada) Chung (Vancouver)	(Liberia) Soumaoro (York); (Canada) Hojabrpour (Forge); (Canada) Campbell (Valour)	(Syria) Babouli (York); (Switzerland) del Campo (Ottawa); (Canada) Dias (Cavalry)	
6	(France) Vincensini (York)	(Canada) Antonoglou (Valour); (Uganda) Enyou (Vancouver); (Canada) Romeo (Vancouver); (Canada) Aird (Cavalry)	(Peru) Fry (Vancouver); (Portugal) Ressurreição (Valour); (Canada) Aparicio (Ottawa)	(Switzerland) del Campo (Ottawa); (Trinidad and Tobago) Shaw (Cavalry); (Canada) Ricci (York)	
7	(Algeria) Yesli (Ottawa)	(Canada) Gee (Vancouver); (Canada) Abatneh (York); (Canada) Didić (Ottawa); (Canada) Aird (Cavalry)	(Canada) Aparicio (Ottawa); (Peru) Fry (Vancouver); (United States) Sánchez (Valour)	(Switzerland) del Campo (Ottawa); (New Zealand) Dyer (Vancouver); (Canada) Ricci (York)	
8	(Canada) Viscosi (Valour)	(Mexico) Parra (Forge); (Colombia) Quintana (Pacific); (Australia) Mourdoukoutas (Valour); (Canada) Fernandez (HFX)	(Canada) Borges (Forge); (Canada) Yeates (Pacific); (Spain) Zapater (Ottawa); (Canada) Ferrazzo (HFX)	(Canada) Poku (Forge); (Australia) Swibel (Valour)	
9	(Canada) Carducci (Cavalry)	(England) Owolabi-Belewu (Forge); (Canada) Meilleur-Giguère (Pacific); (Netherlands) Klomp (Cavalry)	(Canada) de Brienne (Ottawa); (England) Adekugbe (York); (Northern Ireland) Bassett (Ottawa); (Canada) Aird (Cavalry)	(Ukraine) Voytsekhovskyy (York); (Germany) Warschewski (Cavalry); (New Zealand) Dyer (Vancouver)	
10	(France) Vincensini (York)	(Canada) Lajeunesse (Pacific); (Canada) Sturing (York); (Netherlands) Klomp (Cavalry); (Canada) Chung (Vancouver)	(Canada) Ferrin (HFX); (Belgium) Badibanga (Forge); (Canada) Bayiha (HFX); (Canada) Yeates (Pacific); (Canada) Young (Pacific)	(Canada) Wright (York)	
11	(Canada) Fillion (HFX)	(Republic of Ireland) Field (Cavalry); (Canada) Adekugbe (York); (Canada) Nimick (HFX)	(Mexico) Martínez (York); (Canada) Bekker (Forge); (Canada) Callegari (HFX); (Spain) Zapater (Ottawa)	(Canada) Poku (Forge); (Canada) Wright (York); (Trinidad and Tobago) Telfer (HFX)	
12	(Canada) Irving (Vancouver)	(Canada) Facchineri (Valour); (Canada) Didić (Ottawa); (Canada) Romeo (Vancouver)	(Canada) Antonoglou (Valour); (Canada) Callegari (HFX); (Mali) Sissoko (Ottawa); (Canada) Ferrazzo (HFX)	(Portugal) Ressurreição (Valour); (Trinidad and Tobago) Telfer (HFX); (Spain) Morer (Ottawa)	
13	(Canada) Gazdov (Pacific)	(Canada) Mukumbilwa (Pacific); (Canada) Kobza (Cavalry); (Colombia) Quintana (Pacific); (Canada) Aird (Cavalry)	(Canada) Córdova (York); (Canada) Bahous (Pacific); (Ukraine) Voytsekhovskyy (York); (Lebanon) Bitar (Vancouver); (Canada) Choinière (Forge)	(Germany) Warschewski (Cavalry)	
14	(Canada) Ingham (Ottawa)	(Mexico) Parra (Forge); (Mexico) León (York); (Canada) Walker (Ottawa)	(Canada) Jimoh (York); (Canada) Hojabrpour (Forge); (Northern Ireland) Bassett (Ottawa); (Canada) Borges (Forge)	(Canada) Tabla (Ottawa); (Canada) Poku (Forge); (Syria) Babouli (York)	
15	(Canada) Kalongo (Forge)	(Canada) Antonoglou (Valour); (Netherlands) Klomp (Cavalry); (Canada) Nimick (HFX); (Canada) Ferrari (York)	(Canada) Mlah (Valour); (Canada) Callegari (HFX); (Canada) Bekker (Forge)	(Republic of Ireland) McDonnell (Vancouver); (Switzerland) del Campo (Ottawa); (Canada) Camargo (Cavalry)	
16	(Czech Republic) Koleilat (Forge)	(Canada) Antonoglou (Valour); (Republic of Ireland) Field (Cavalry); (Sweden) Achinioti-Jönsson (Forge)	(Canada) Henry (Cavalry); (Canada) Gutiérrez (Cavalry); (Canada) Córdova (York); (England) Adekugbe (York); (Canada) Bekker (Forge)	(Canada) Hundal (Valour); (Canada) Poku (Forge)	
17	(Canada) Viscosi (Valour)	(Canada) Timoteo (HFX); (Netherlands) Klomp (Cavalry); (Canada) Facchineri (Valour); (Canada) Dada-Luke (Pacific)	(Mexico) Guzmán (York); (Somalia) Musse (Cavalry); (Canada) Faria (Valour); (Trinidad and Tobago) Rampersad (HFX); (Canada) Gutiérrez (Cavalry)	(Australia) Swibel (Valour)	
18	(France) Vincensini (York)	(Canada) Cameron (Vancouver); (Netherlands) Klomp (Cavalry); (Canada) Abatneh (York); (Canada) Aird (Cavalry)	(Canada) Bekker (Forge); (Canada) Hojabrpour (Forge); (Mexico) Martínez (York)	(Canada) Borges (Forge); (Mexico) Díaz (Vancouver); (Somalia) Musse (Cavalry)	
19	(Czech Republic) Koleilat (Forge)	(Greece) Iliadis (Ottawa); (Netherlands) Klomp (Cavalry); (Canada) Didić (Ottawa)	(Canada) Antonoglou (Valour); (Canada) Mlah (Valour); (Canada) Henry (Cavalry); (Canada) Aird (Cavalry); (Canada) Hojabrpour (Forge)	(Canada) Hamilton (Forge); (Australia) Swibel (Valour)	
20	(Canada) Gazdov (Pacific)	(France) Kamdem (Cavalry); (Netherlands) Klomp (Cavalry); (Canada) Nimick (HFX); (Canada) Campbell (Valour)	(Canada) Córdova (York); (Canada) Hojabrpour (Forge); (Canada) Gutiérrez (Cavalry); (Netherlands) Sellouf (Vancouver)	(Lebanon) Bitar (Vancouver); (Canada) Salter (Ottawa)	
21	(Canada) Kalongo (Forge)	(Canada) Antonoglou (Valour); (Greece) Iliadis (Ottawa); (Canada) Samuel (Forge); (Spain) Morer (Ottawa)	(Ghana) Ohin (Valour); (Trinidad and Tobago) Rampersad (HFX); (Canada) Gutiérrez (Cavalry); (Canada) Jensen (Forge)	(Canada) Ferrin (HFX); (Trinidad and Tobago) Telfer (HFX)	
22	(Czech Republic) Koleilat (Forge)	(Greece) Iliadis (Ottawa); (Canada) Higgins (York); (Sweden) Achinioti-Jönsson (Forge); (Canada) Dada-Luke (Pacific)	(Canada) Borges (Forge); (England) Adekugbe (York); (Ghana) Ohin (Valour); (Canada) Zanatta (Pacific)	(New Zealand) Dyer (Pacific); (Canada) Hundal (Valour)	
23	(Canada) Viscosi (Valour)	(Canada) Fernandez (HFX); (Canada) Meilleur-Giguère (Pacific); (Netherlands) Klomp (Cavalry); (Canada) Bayiha (HFX)	(Romania) Tîrcoveanu (Pacific); (England) Adekugbe (York); (Canada) Aparicio (Ottawa)	(Italy) Probo (HFX); (Canada) Zanatta (Pacific); (Somalia) Musse (Cavalry)	
24	(Canada) Viscosi (Valour)	(Canada) Fernandez (HFX); (Algeria) Mekidèche (HFX); (Canada) Meilleur-Giguère (Pacific); (Senegal) Cissé (Forge)	(Belgium) Badibanga (Forge); (Canada) Camargo (Cavalry); (Canada) Callegari (HFX); (Canada) Choinière (Forge)	(Germany) Warschewski (Cavalry); (New Zealand) Dyer (Pacific)	
25	(Canada) Irving (Vancouver)	(Canada) Antonoglou (Valour); (Canada) Didić (Ottawa); (Australia) Mourdoukoutas (Valour); (Sweden) Achinioti-Jönsson (Forge); (Canada) Cameron (Vancouver)	(Canada) Jensen (Forge); (Canada) Callegari (HFX); (Canada) Bekker (Forge)	(Trinidad and Tobago) Telfer (HFX); (Belgium) Badibanga (Forge)	
26	(Canada) Irving (Vancouver)	(Republic of Ireland) Field (Cavalry); (Canada) Norman (Vancouver); (Haiti) Metusala (Forge); (Canada) Ferrari (York)	(New Zealand) Herdman (Cavalry); (Brazil) Dias (HFX); (Canada) Jimoh (York); (Canada) Bekker (Forge); (Canada) Jensen (Forge)	(Germany) Warschewski (Cavalry)	
27	(Canada) Melvin (Pacific)	(Canada) de Brienne (Ottawa); (Canada) Montgomery (Cavalry); (Canada) Didić (Ottawa); (Canada) Dada-Luke (Pacific)	(Germany) Warschewski (Cavalry); (Canada) Salter (Ottawa); (Somalia) Musse (Cavalry); (Northern Ireland) Bassett (Ottawa); (Canada) Aparicio (Ottawa)	(Trinidad and Tobago) Moore (Pacific)	
28	(Canada) Rushenas (HFX)	(Canada) Meilleur-Giguère (Pacific); (Colombia) Quintana (Pacific); (Netherlands) Klomp (Cavalry)	(Canada) Zanatta (Pacific); (Peru) Fry (Vancouver); (Canada) Young (Pacific); (Canada) Ferrin (HFX)	(Germany) Warschewski (Cavalry); (Canada) Coimbra (HFX); (Somalia) Musse (Cavalry)	

=== Monthly awards ===
Month	Manager of the Month		Player of the Month		Goalkeeper of the Month		References
Month	Manager	Club	Player	Club	Goalkeeper	Club	References
April	(Canada) Bobby Smyrniotis	Forge FC	(Canada) Tristan Borges	Forge FC	(Canada) Christopher Kalongo	Forge FC	
May	(Spain) Carlos González	Atlético Ottawa	(Switzerland) Rubén del Campo	Atlético Ottawa	(Canada) Callum Irving	Vancouver FC	
June	(Canada) Patrice Gheisar	HFX Wanderers FC	(Canada) Kwasi Poku	Forge FC	(France) Thomas Vincensini	York United FC	
July	(Mexico) Benjamín Mora	York United FC	(Syria) Mo Babouli	York United FC	(Canada) Marco Carducci	Cavalry FC	
August	(England) Tommy Wheeldon Jr.	Cavalry FC	(Netherlands) Daan Klomp	Cavalry FC	(France) Thomas Vincensini	York United FC	
September	(Canada) Bobby Smyrniotis	Forge FC	(New Zealand) Moses Dyer	Pacific FC	(Canada) Jonathan Viscosi	Valour FC	
October	(England) Tommy Wheeldon Jr.	Cavalry FC	(Germany) Tobias Warschewski	Cavalry FC	(Canada) Nathan Ingham	Atlético Ottawa	

== Player transfers ==
According to FIFA's worldwide registration periods calendar, the Canadian Soccer Association's (CSA's) 2024 pre-season transfer window opened on January 31 and closed on April 23; the mid-season transfer window would open on July 18 and close on August 14. However, the CPL later announced that its mid-season transfer window would instead open on July 5 and close on August 2, contradicting FIFA's published dates. This discrepancy was resolved on July 11 when the CSA announced that the mid-season transfer window would open on July 12 and close on August 8 as a compromise between the CPL's and Major League Soccer's interests.

CPL clubs were required to be fully roster compliant by April 1 at 5:00 pm ET; rosters were frozen on September 13 at 4:00 pm ET.

=== U Sports Draft ===
The 2024 CPL–U Sports Draft took place on December 14, 2023. Each team made two picks in the draft, for a total of 16 selections.

=== Foreign players ===
Canadian Premier League teams can sign a maximum of seven international players, out of which only five can be in the starting line-up for each match.

The following international players were signed for the 2024 season. Note that players may be considered domestic for CPL purposes (Canadian citizens, permanent residents, or refugees) while still representing other countries in international competitions.

Club	Player 1	Player 2	Player 3	Player 4	Player 5	Player 6	Player 7	Inactive players (Note: Players who remain under contract but have suffered season-ending injury and may not return to play. They do not count towards roster or cap restrictions and as such can be replaced by another foreign player.)	Former players
Atlético Ottawa	(Northern Ireland) Ollie Bassett	(Spain) Alberto Zapater	(Switzerland) Rubén del Campo	(Ecuador) Liberman Torres	(Portugal) Kévin dos Santos	(Spain) Dani Morer	(Spain) Jesús del Amo		(France) Aboubakary Sacko
Cavalry	(Netherlands) Daan Klomp	(Australia) Jesse Daley	(Republic of Ireland) Tom Field	(Germany) Tobias Warschewski	(Germany) Nicolas Wähling				(England) Jack Barrett (Australia) Lleyton Brooks
Forge	(Sweden) Alexander Achinioti-Jönsson	(England) Malik Owolabi-Belewu	(Belgium) Béni Badibanga	(Senegal) **Elimane Cissé**	(Ghana) **Nana Opoku Ampomah**	(Mexico) Daniel Parra	(Belgium) Victor Klonaridis		
HFX Wanderers	(Trinidad and Tobago) **Andre Rampersad**	(France) Lorenzo Callegari	(Brazil) Vitor Dias	(Italy) Giorgio Probo					(United States) Christian Volesky
Pacific	(Trinidad and Tobago) **Reon Moore**	(Romania) Andrei Tîrcoveanu	(Colombia) Juan Quintana	(Argentina) Kevin Ceceri	(New Zealand) **Moses Dyer**			(France) Aly Ndom	(Netherlands) Ayman Sellouf
Valour	(Spain) Roberto Alarcón	(Australia) Tass Mourdoukoutas	(Australia) Jordan Swibel	(Germany) Charalampos Chantzopoulos	(Portugal) Diogo Ressurreição			(England) Kian Williams	
Vancouver	(Mexico) Alejandro Díaz	(Brazil) Renan Garcia	(Mexico) José Navarro	(Uganda) Allan Enyou	(Belgium) Olivier Rommens	(Netherlands) Ayman Sellouf			(New Zealand) **Moses Dyer**
York United	(Liechtenstein) **Dennis Salanović**	(Mexico) Oswaldo León	(Mexico) Orlando Botello	(Mexico) Josué Martínez	(France) Thomas Vincensini	(Mexico) Jorge Guzmán	(Mexico) Santiago Márquez		(Liberia) **Brem Soumaoro**

Players in italic denote players who were new to their respective clubs for the 2024 season, sorted chronologically by their announcement. Players in Bold indicate players who have represented their national teams at the senior level.
