= 2024 York United FC season =

York United FC
2024 season
- Head coach: Martin Nash (until May 21); Mauro Eustáquio (interim, from May 21 until June 4); Benjamín Mora (from June 4)
- Stadium: York Lions Stadium
- Canadian Premier League: 4th
- CPL playoffs: Quarter-finals
- Canadian Championship: Preliminary round
- Top goalscorer: League: Brian Wright (9); All: Brian Wright (9)
- Highest home attendance: 2,654 (April 21 vs Forge FC)
- Average home league attendance: 1,499
Home colours	Away colours

The 2024 York United FC season was the sixth season in the history of York United FC. In addition to the Canadian Premier League, the club also competed in the Canadian Championship.

After a 2023 season in which it was operated by Canadian Soccer Business, York United was sold to a new Mexican ownership group, Game Plan Sports, in late November 2023. York United played the 2024 season at York Lions Stadium, while the new owners were looking into alternative permanent venues for the future.

On May 21, manager Martin Nash was relieved of his head coaching duties and replaced by Mauro Eustáquio on an interim basis. On June 4, York United FC announced Benjamín Mora as their new head coach.

== Squad ==
As of September 13, 2024.

No.	Player	Nationality	Position(s)	Date of birth (age)	Previous club	Notes
Goalkeepers
1	Thomas Vincensini	(France)	GK	September 12, 1993 (aged 31)	(Belgium) Virton	INT
18	Eleias Himaras	(Canada)	GK	March 8, 2002 (aged 22)	(Canada) Electric City	
Defenders
4	Oswaldo León	(Mexico)	CB	June 15, 1999 (aged 25)	(Mexico) Dorados de Sinaloa	INT
5	Frank Sturing	(Canada)	CB	May 29, 1997 (aged 27)	(Austria) SV Horn	
6	Orlando Botello	(Mexico)	LB	August 6, 2001 (aged 23)	(Mexico) C.F. Monterrey U23	INT, Loan
16	Max Ferrari	(Canada)	LW / RW	August 20, 2000 (aged 24)	(Canada) Aurora FC	
23	Noah Abatneh	(Canada)	RB / CB	September 28, 2004 (aged 20)	(Italy) AC Campodarsego	U21
30	Kadin Martin-Pereux	(Canada)	FB / MF	October 9, 2002 (aged 22)	(Germany) SC Paderborn 07 II	IL
62	Nyal Higgins	(Canada)	CB	January 19, 1998 (aged 26)	(Canada) Vaughan Azzurri	
	Finn Raible	(Canada)	CB	April 15, 2008 (aged 16)	(Canada) Edmonton BTB SC	DEV
Midfielders
7	Juan Córdova	(Canada) / (Chile)	FB	June 25, 1995 (aged 29)	(Chile) Ñublense	
8	Elijah Adekugbe	(England) / (Canada)	MF	July 17, 1996 (aged 28)	(Canada) Cavalry FC	
12	Santiago Márquez	(Mexico)	CM	December 13, 2003 (aged 21)	(Mexico) Necaxa	INT, Loan
15	Josué Martínez	(Mexico)	CM	March 28, 2002 (aged 22)	(Mexico) C.F. Monterrey U23	INT, Loan
21	Kembo Kibato	(Canada)	MF	September 16, 2000 (aged 24)	(Canada) Vancouver FC	
24	Tomas Giraldo	(Canada)	AM / CM	March 8, 2003 (aged 21)	(Canada) HFX Wanderers	U21, Loan
26	Joshua Lopez	(Canada)	MF	May 26, 2008 (aged 16)	(Canada) TFC Academy	DEV
27	Lukas Pareja	(Canada)	MF		(Canada) Cavalry FC U21	DEV
33	Matthew Baldisimo	(Philippines) / (Canada)	DM / CM	January 20, 1998 (aged 26)	(Canada) Pacific FC	
37	Trivine Esprit	(Canada)	MF	February 14, 2002 (aged 22)	(Canada) Darby FC	U-S
	Anthony Umanzor	(Canada) / (El Salvador)	DM / CM	March 29, 2008 (aged 16)	(Canada) TFC Academy	DEV
Forwards
9	Brian Wright	(Canada)	CF	March 24, 1995 (aged 29)	(Canada) Atlético Ottawa	
10	Molham Babouli	(Syria) / (Canada)	CF / LW / RW	February 1, 1993 (aged 31)	(Qatar) Muaither SC	
11	Dennis Salanović	(Liechtenstein)	LW / RW	February 26, 1996 (aged 28)	(Spain) CF Talavera	INT
14	Theo Afework	(Canada)	CF	January 24, 2004 (aged 20)	(Germany) Nürnberg U19	U21
17	Markiyan Voytsekhovskyy	(Ukraine) / (Canada)	AM / LW / RW	November 27, 2003 (aged 21)	(Canada) ProStars FC	U21
19	Shola Jimoh	(Canada)	LW	April 8, 2008 (aged 16)	(Canada) York United FC Academy	U21, EYT
20	Jorge Guzmán	(Mexico)	CF / LW	December 13, 2003 (aged 21)	(Mexico) Atlas FC	INT, Loan

== Transfers ==
=== In ===
No.	Pos.	Player	From club	Fee/notes	Date	Source
11	MF	(Liechtenstein) Dennis Salanović	(Spain) CF Talavera	Free	January 3, 2024	
7	DF	(Canada) Juan Córdova	(Chile) Ñublense	Free	January 4, 2024	
4	DF	(Mexico) Oswaldo León	(Mexico) Dorados de Sinaloa	Free	January 23, 2024	
5	DF	(Canada) Frank Sturing	(Austria) SV Horn	Free	January 30, 2024	
1	GK	(France) Thomas Vincensini	(Belgium) Virton	Free	February 27, 2024	
62	DF	(Canada) Nyal Higgins	(Canada) Vaughan Azzurri	Free	April 12, 2024	
21	MF	(Canada) Christian Zeppieri	(Canada) Vaughan Azzurri	Selected 4th in the 2024 CPL–U Sports Draft, U-Sports contract	April 12, 2024	
37	MF	(Canada) Trivine Esprit	(Canada) Darby FC	U-Sports contract	April 21, 2024	
13	MF	(Canada) Jason Hartill	(Canada) Cape Breton University	U-Sports contract	May 4, 2024	
19	FW	(Canada) Shola Jimoh	(Canada) York United FC Academy	Exceptional Young Talent contract	June 8, 2024	
27	MF	(Canada) Lukas Pareja	(Canada) Cavalry FC U21	Developmental contract	September 5, 2024	
21	MF	(Canada) Kembo Kibato	(Canada) Vancouver FC	Free	September 13, 2024	
	DF	(Canada) Finn Raible	(Canada) Edmonton BTB SC	Developmental contract	September 13, 2024	
	MF	(Canada) Anthony Umanzor	(Canada) TFC Academy	Developmental contract	September 13, 2024	
	MF	(Canada) Joshua Lopez	(Canada) TFC Academy	Developmental contract	September 13, 2024	

==== Loans in ====
No.	Pos.	Player	Loaned from	Fee/notes	Date	Source
6	DF	(Mexico) Orlando Botello	(Mexico) C.F. Monterrey U23	Loaned until end of season	February 2, 2024	
15	MF	(Mexico) Josué Martínez	(Mexico) C.F. Monterrey U23	Loaned until end of season	February 2, 2024	
24	MF	(Canada) Tomas Giraldo	(Canada) HFX Wanderers	Loaned until end of season	May 28, 2024	
20	FW	(Mexico) Jorge Guzmán	(Mexico) Atlas FC	Loaned until end of season	July 26, 2024	
12	MF	(Mexico) Santiago Márquez	(Mexico) Necaxa	Loaned until end of season	August 13, 2024	

==== Draft picks ====
York United selected the following players in the 2024 CPL–U Sports Draft. Draft picks are not automatically signed to the team roster. Only those who are signed to a contract will be listed as transfers in.

Round	Selection	Pos.	Player	Nationality	University
1	4	MF	Christian Zeppieri	Canada	York
2	12	MF	Jason Hartill	Canada	Cape Breton

=== Out ===
==== Transferred out ====
No.	Pos.	Player	To club	Fee/notes	Date	Source
3	DF	(Australia) Tass Mourdoukoutas	(Canada) Valour FC	Contract expired	December 4, 2023	
6	DF	(Canada) Roger Thompson	Retired		December 20, 2023	
2	DF	(Canada) Paris Gee	(Canada) Vancouver FC	Contract expired	December 22, 2023	
7	DF	(Guyana) Jonathan Grant	(Canada) Atlético Ottawa	Contract expired	December 22, 2023	
21	MF	(Canada) Michael Petrasso		Contract expired	December 22, 2023	
27	MF	(Canada) Carson Buschman-Dormond	(Canada) Altitude FC	Contract expired	December 22, 2023	
28	MF	(Canada) Jérémy Gagnon-Laparé	(Canada) HFX Wanderers	Contract expired	December 22, 2023	
11	MF	(Portugal) Kévin dos Santos	(Canada) Atlético Ottawa	Contract expired	February 20, 2024	
24	FW	(Guyana) Osaze De Rosario	(United States) Tacoma Defiance	Undisclosed sell-on clause	March 19, 2024	
1	GK	(Canada) Niko Giantsopoulos	(Canada) Vancouver FC	Contract expired	April 5, 2024	
32	MF	(Liberia) Brem Soumaoro	(United States) Indy Eleven	Contract terminated by mutual consent	August 6, 2024	
22	FW	(Canada) Austin Ricci	(Canada) Vancouver FC	Free	September 13, 2024	

==== Loans out ====
No.	Pos.	Player	Loaned to	Fee/notes	Date	Source
12	MF	(Canada) Clément Bayiha	(Canada) HFX Wanderers	Loaned until end of season	May 28, 2024	

== Pre-season and friendlies ==
Win Draw Loss Fixtures

February 24, 2024 Friendly	York United FC	4–0	CS Saint-Laurent	Toronto, Ontario
		Report
Note: Game played behind closed doors

March 1, 2024 Friendly	York United FC	v	Vaughan Azzurri	Toronto, Ontario
		Report
Note: Game played behind closed doors

March 10, 2024 Friendly	York United FC	v	Toronto FC II	Toronto, Ontario
		Report
Note: Game played behind closed doors

March 16, 2024 Friendly	Forge FC	1–1	York United FC	Hamilton, Ontario
		Report		Stadium: Tim Hortons Field
Note: Game played behind closed doors

March 22, 2024 Friendly	Tigres UANL	1–0	York United FC	San Nicolás de los Garza, Nuevo León
		Report		Stadium: Estadio Universitario
Note: Game played behind closed doors

March 24, 2024 Friendly	C.F. Monterrey	0–0	York United FC	Guadalupe, Nuevo León
		Report		Stadium: Estadio BBVA

April 6, 2024 Friendly	Simcoe County Rovers FC	2–3	York United FC	Barrie, Ontario
		Report		Stadium: J.C. Massie Field at Georgian College

== Competitions ==
Matches are listed in Toronto local time: Eastern Daylight Time (UTC−4) until November 3, and Eastern Standard Time (UTC−5) otherwise.

=== Overview ===
Competition	Record							
Competition	Pld	W	D	L	GF	GA	GD	Win %
Canadian Premier League	28	11	6	11	35	36	−1	39.29
Canadian Championship	1	0	0	1	1	3	−2	0.00
Total	29	11	6	12	36	39	−3	37.93

Last updated: Oct 19, 2024
Source: Competitions

=== Canadian Premier League ===
==== Table ====
Pos	Team	Pld	W	D	L	GF	GA	GD	Pts	Playoff qualification
1	Forge (S)	28	15	5	8	45	31	+14	50	First semifinal
2	Cavalry (C)	28	12	12	4	39	27	+12	48	First semifinal
3	Atlético Ottawa	28	11	11	6	42	31	+11	44	Quarterfinal
4	York United	28	11	6	11	35	36	−1	39	Play-in round
5	Pacific	28	9	7	12	27	32	−5	34	Play-in round
6	HFX Wanderers	28	7	9	12	37	43	−6	30 (Note: Head-to-head points: HFX Wanderers 7, Vancouver 4)	
7	Vancouver	28	7	9	12	29	43	−14	30	
8	Valour	28	7	7	14	31	42	−11	28	

Source: CanPL
Rules for classification: 1) Points; 2) Total number of wins; 3) Head-to-head; 4) Goal differential; 5) Goals for; 6) Away goals differential; 7) Away goals for; 8) Home goals differential; 9) Home goals for; 10) Fewest disciplinary points; 11) Most under-21 domestic player minutes; 12) Drawing of lots.
(C) Champion (qualified to Champions Cup Round one); (S) CPL Shield winner (qualified to Champions Cup Round one)

==== Results by match ====
Match	1	2	3	4	5	6	7	8	9	10	11	12	13	14	15	16	17	18	19	20	21	22	23	24	25	26	27	28
Result	L	L	W	L	W	D	W	L	D	W	W	L	W	W	D	W	D	W	L	D	L	W	D	L	L	W	L	L
Position	6	7	5	5	5	5	5	5	6	5	3	4	2	2	2	2	2	2	3	4	4	3	3	4	4	4	4	4

Updated to match(es) played on Oct 19, 2024. Source: #Matches
W = Win; D = Draw; L = Loss

==== Matches ====
April 13 1	Atlético Ottawa	2–1	York United FC	Ottawa, Ontario
1:00pm	Singh (yellow card) 43'; Aparicio 63' (yellow card) 90+4'; Twardek (yellow card) 78' (goal) 79'	Report	Abatneh (yellow card) 45'; Ricci 48' (yellow card) 77'; Botello (yellow card) 84'	Stadium: TD Place Stadium; Referee: Yusri Rudolf

April 21 2	York United FC	0–3	Forge FC	Toronto, Ontario
4:00pm	Zeppieri (yellow card) 63'; Martin-Pereux (yellow card) 90+4'	Report	Achinioti-Jönsson (yellow card) 19'; Choinière 45+1' 67'; Badibanga (yellow card) 55' (goal) 61'; Borges (yellow card) 64'; Kane (yellow card) 90+1'	Stadium: York Lions Stadium; Attendance: 2,654; Referee: Myriam Marcotte

April 26 3	York United FC	3–0	Vancouver FC	Toronto, Ontario
7:00pm	Wright 70' 90+3'; Salanović 83' (yellow card) 87'; Ferrari (yellow card) 85'	Report	Fry (yellow card) 10'; Kibato (yellow card) 28'; Renan (yellow card) 74'	Stadium: York Lions Stadium; Attendance: 843; Referee: Renzo Villanueva

May 4 4	Pacific FC	2–0	York United FC	Langford, British Columbia
7:00pm	Moore 15'; Dada-Luke (yellow card) 28'; Toussaint (yellow card) 41'; Ferrari 77' (o.g.)	Report	Soumaoro (yellow card) 41'; Salanović (yellow card) 43'; Adekugbe (yellow card) 90+2'	Stadium: Starlight Stadium; Attendance: 2,161; Referee: Sebastian Noshinravani

May 10 5	York United FC	3–1	Valour FC	Toronto, Ontario
7:00pm	Ferrari (yellow card) 11'; Babouli (yellow card) 45+3' (goal) 90+1'; Abatneh 68'; Wright 74'; Sturing (yellow card) 82'; Botello (yellow card) 90+2'; Ricci (yellow card) 90+6'	Report	Campbell 15'; Sánchez (yellow card) 28'; Ressurreição (yellow card) 36'; Hanson (yellow card) 60'	Stadium: York Lions Stadium; Attendance: 1,049; Referee: Yusri Rudolf

May 18 6	Cavalry FC	2–2	York United FC	Calgary, Alberta
7:00pm	Warschewski 24' (pen.); Dias (yellow card) 45'; Shaw 72'; Myroniuk (yellow card) 77'	Report	Ferrari (yellow card) 23'; Ricci (yellow card) 40' (goal) 62'; Wright 68'; Vincensini (yellow card) 79'; Botello (yellow card) 79'; Martínez (yellow card) 81'	Stadium: ATCO Field; Referee: Renzo Villanueva

May 24 7	York United FC	2–1	HFX Wanderers FC	Toronto, Ontario
7:00pm	Ricci 20'; Salanović 32'; Botello (yellow card) 65'; Córdova (yellow card) 86'	Report	Dunn (yellow card) 8'; Fernandez (yellow card) 19'; Telfer 82'	Stadium: York Lions Stadium; Attendance: 1,226; Referee: Sebastian Noshinravani

June 1 8	Forge FC	3–0	York United FC	Hamilton, Ontario
4:00pm	Bekker 29'; Borges 34' (yellow card) 45+4'; Badibanga (yellow card) 45+4'; Parra 53'	Report	Botello (yellow card) 16'; Martínez (yellow card) 40'; Abatneh (yellow card) 45+4'; Ricci (yellow card) 45+4'; León (yellow card) 45+4'; Voitsekhovskyi (yellow card) 85'	Stadium: Tim Hortons Field; Referee: Mario Alayass

June 9 9	York United FC	2–2	Vancouver FC	Toronto, Ontario
6:00pm	Voytsekhovskyy 18' (yellow card) 56'; Córdova 42' (yellow card) 90+2'; Abatneh (yellow card) 59'; Martínez (yellow card) 66'	Report	Díaz 21'; Gee (yellow card) 68'; Dyer 77' (pen.); Dzikowski (yellow card) 84'	Stadium: York Lions Stadium; Attendance: 1,167; Referee: Michael Venne

June 15 10	Atlético Ottawa	1–2	York United FC	Ottawa, Ontario
1:00pm	Sissoko (yellow card) 50'; Đidić 69'; Singh (yellow card) 90+1'	Report	Wright 36' 49'; Botello (yellow card) 56'; Martin-Pereux (yellow card) 77'; Adekugbe (yellow card) 90+4'	Stadium: TD Place Stadium; Referee: Fabrizio Stasolla

June 19 11	York United FC	2–0	Pacific FC	Toronto, Ontario
7:00pm	Wright 37'; Ricci (red card) 38'; Soumaoro (yellow card) 43'; Babouli 53'; Vincensini (yellow card) 73'; Botello (yellow card) 90+1'	Report	Young (yellow card) 38'	Stadium: York Lions Stadium; Attendance: 844; Referee: Marie-Soleil Beaudoin

June 27 12	Valour FC	1–0	York United FC	Winnipeg, Manitoba
7:30pm	Ressurreição 29' (yellow card) 68'; Ohin (yellow card) 76'; Alarcón (yellow card) 81'; Hanson (yellow card) 87'	Report	Botello (yellow card) 32'; Adekugbe (yellow card) 89'	Stadium: IG Field; Referee: Iwan-Nikita Jecanski

July 6 13	York United FC	2–1	HFX Wanderers FC	Toronto, Ontario
4:00pm	Voytsekhovskyi 17'; Martínez (yellow card) 51'; Córdova 58'	Report	Gagnon-Laparé (yellow card) 18'; Fillion (yellow card) 77'; Loughrey (yellow card) 77'; Probo 87'; Fernandez (yellow card) 90+2'	Stadium: York Lions Stadium; Attendance: 1,279; Referee: Mathieu Souaré

July 13 14	Cavalry FC	1–2	York United FC	Calgary, Alberta
4:00pm	Aird (yellow card) 35'; Klomp (yellow card) 52'; Montgomery (yellow card) 61'; Warschewski 90+8'	Report	Wright (yellow card) 18'; Abatneh (yellow card) 24'; León (yellow card) 35'; Babouli 63'; Sturing (yellow card) 78'; Jimoh 82'; Higgins (yellow card) 83'; Botello (yellow card) 90+2'	Stadium: ATCO Field; Attendance: 4,234; Referee: Roberto D'Alesio

July 20 15	Vancouver FC	1–1	York United FC	Langley, British Columbia
6:00pm	Garcia (yellow card) 57'; Díaz 90+3'; Enyou (yellow card) 90+5'	Report	M. Williams (yellow card) 41'; Babouli 46'; Martínez (yellow card) 73'; Baldisimo (yellow card) 82'	Stadium: Willoughby Community Park; Referee: Michael Venne

July 26 16	York United FC	4–1	Atlético Ottawa	Toronto, Ontario
7:00pm	Adekugbe (yellow card) 12' (goal) 41'; Córdova 51'; Babouli 78'; León (yellow card) 82'; Wright 89'	Report	Bassett 6' (yellow card) 82'; Singh (yellow card) 38'; Twardek (yellow card) 54'; Zapater (yellow card) 56'; Aparicio (yellow card) 69'; Morer (yellow card) 90+1'	Stadium: York Lions Stadium; Attendance: 2,019; Referee: Renzo Villaneuva

August 2 17	Pacific FC	1–1	York United FC	Langford, British Columbia
10:00pm	Meilleur-Giguère 2'; Domínguez (yellow card) 40'; Mukumbilwa (yellow card) 55'	Report	Wright 9'; Martínez (yellow card) 43'	Stadium: Starlight Stadium; Referee: Sebastian Noshinravani

August 11 18	Valour FC	0–1	York United FC	Winnipeg, Manitoba
8:00pm	Campbell (yellow card) 62'; Kwemi (yellow card) 89'	Report	Vincensini (yellow card) 51'; Ricci 77'; Martínez (yellow card) 90+6'; Babouli (yellow card) 90+6'	Stadium: IG Field; Referee: Renzo Villanueva

August 16 19	York United FC	1–2	Cavalry FC	Toronto, Ontario
7:00pm	Babouli (yellow card) 4'; Martínez 43'; León (yellow card) 51' (yellow-red card) 90+4'; Córdova (yellow card) 65'	Report	Klomp (yellow card) 27'; Henry 35' (yellow card) 67'; Aird 52'; Carducci (yellow card) 76'; Daley (yellow card) 90+5'	Stadium: York Lions Stadium; Attendance: 1,594; Referee: Ben Hoskins

August 23 20	York United FC	0–0	Forge FC	Toronto, Ontario
7:00pm	Adekugbe (yellow card) 47'	Report	Bekker (yellow card) 45'; Badibanga (yellow card) 52'; Ampomah (yellow card) 59'	Stadium: York Lions Stadium; Attendance: 1,824; Referee: Mathieu Souaré

September 2 21	HFX Wanderers	2–1	York United FC	Halifax, Nova Scotia
3:00pm	Ferrin 22'; Fillion (yellow card) 42'; Gagnon-Laparé (yellow card) 64'; Fernandez 67'; Callegari (yellow card) 75'; Nimick (yellow card) 90+2'	Report	Ferrari (yellow card) 39'; Córdova (yellow card) 57'; Márquez (yellow card) 70'; Nimick 76' (o.g.)	Stadium: Wanderers Grounds; Referee: Yusri Rudolf

September 6 22	Vancouver FC	0–1	York United FC	Langley, British Columbia
10:00pm	Chung (yellow card) 37'; Ghotbi (yellow card) 38'; Fry (yellow card) 71'; Rommens (yellow card) 79'	Report	Higgins 4' (yellow card) 30'; Botello (yellow card) 64'	Stadium: Willoughby Community Park; Attendance: 2,773; Referee: Marie-Soleil Beaudoin

September 13 23	York United FC	1–1	Valour FC	Toronto, Ontario
7:00pm	Jimoh 19'; Botello (yellow card) 38'; Ferrari (yellow card) 51'; León (yellow card) 57'; Guzmán (yellow card) 87'	Report	Wahid (yellow card) 31'; Hundal 44'; Ohin (yellow card) 79'	Stadium: York Lions Stadium; Attendance: 1,607; Referee: Sebastian Noshinravani

September 20 24	York United FC	0–2	Cavalry FC	Toronto, Ontario
7:00pm	León (yellow card) 45+1'; Ferrari (yellow card) 45+2'; Botello (yellow card) 53'; Córdova (yellow card) 73'; Adekugbe (yellow card) 77'; Guzmán (yellow card) 90+10' (yellow-red card) 90+10'	Report	Musse 20'; Field (yellow card) 57'; Warschewski (yellow card) 59'; Camargo 62'; Chanda (yellow card) 86'; Kamdem (yellow card) 90+1'	Stadium: York Lions Stadium; Attendance: 1,732; Referee: Scott Bowman

September 28 25	Forge FC	2–0	York United FC	Hamilton, Ontario
4:00pm	Metusala (yellow card) 19'; Duncan (yellow card) 45'; Jensen 52'; Opoku Ampomah 86'	Report	Adekugbe (yellow card) 14'; Giraldo (yellow card) 41'; Córdova (yellow card) 90+3'	Stadium: Tim Hortons Field; Referee: Renzo Villanueva

October 6 26	York United FC	1–0	Atlético Ottawa	Toronto, Ontario
5:00pm	Botello (yellow card) 4'; Higgins (yellow card) 68'; Jimoh 69'; Baldisimo (yellow card) 88'	Report	Torres (red card) 25'; Iliadis (yellow card) 90+3'	Stadium: York Lions Stadium; Attendance: 2,114; Referee: Yusri Rudolf

October 10 27	York United FC	1–2	Pacific FC	Toronto, Ontario
7:00pm	Vincensini (yellow card) 24'; León 44'; Márquez (yellow card) 62'; Baldisimo (yellow card) 67'; Ferrari (yellow card) 90+7'	Report	Greco-Taylor (yellow card) 49'; Yeates (yellow card) 49'; Quintana (yellow card) 69'; Moore 82' 88'	Stadium: York Lions Stadium; Attendance: 1,034; Referee: Ben Hoskins

October 19 28	HFX Wanderers FC	2–1	York United FC	Halifax, Nova Scotia
3:00pm	Timoteo (yellow card) 9'; Fillion (yellow card) 43'; Ferrin 63'; Coimbra 82' (yellow card) 84'	Report	Nimick 9' (o.g.); Voytsekhovskyy (yellow card) 40'; León (yellow card) 44'; Córdova (yellow card) 54'	Stadium: Wanderers Grounds; Referee: Marie-Soleil Beaudoin

==== Playoff matches ====
October 23 Play-In Round	York United FC	2–0	Pacific FC	Toronto, Ontario
7:30pm	Córdova (yellow card) 40'; Salanović (yellow card) 43'; León 47'; Babouli 90+2'	Report	Zanatta (yellow card) 64'	Stadium: York Lions Stadium; Attendance: 2,203; Referee: Mathieu Souaré

October 27 Quarterfinal	Atlético Ottawa	2–2 (5–4 p)	York United FC	Ottawa, Ontario
1:00pm	Morer (yellow card) 29'; Bassett 47'; Del Campo (yellow card) 90' (goal) 92' (pen.); Salter (yellow card) 92'	Report	Higgins (yellow card) 74'; Jimoh 90+4'; Adekugbe (yellow card) 91'; Babouli 94'; Botello (yellow card) 109'	Stadium: TD Place Stadium; Referee: Marie-Soleil Beaudoin
	Penalties
	(penalty scored) Didic; (penalty scored) Tissot; (penalty scored) Del Campo; (penalty scored) Zapater; (penalty scored) Iliadis		(penalty scored) Córdova; (penalty missed) Babouli; (penalty scored) Wright; (penalty scored) Botello; (penalty scored) Martínez

=== Canadian Championship ===
May 1 Preliminary Round	Forge FC	3–1	York United FC	Hamilton, Ontario
7:00pm	Hamilton 8' 40'; Choinière 17'; Parra (yellow card) 32'; Badibanga (yellow card) 61'	Report	Adekugbe (yellow card) 26'; Ferrari (yellow card) 30'; Sturing (yellow card) 70'; Martinez 87'; Córdova (yellow card) 90+4'	Stadium: Tim Hortons Field; Attendance: 2,471; Referee: Ben Hoskins

== Statistics ==
=== Squad and statistics ===
As of October 27, 2024

No.	Pos	Nat	Player	Total		Canadian Premier League		Canadian Championship	
No.	Pos	Nat	Player	Apps	Goals	Apps	Goals	Apps	Goals
Goalkeepers
1	GK	(France) FRA	Thomas Vincensini	31	0	30+0	0	1+0	0
18	GK	(Canada) CAN	Eleias Himaras	0	0	0+0	0	0+0	0
Defenders
4	DF	(Mexico) MEX	Oswaldo León	20	2	17+3	2	0+0	0
5	DF	(Canada) CAN	Frank Sturing	20	0	18+1	0	1+0	0
6	DF	(Mexico) MEX	Orlando Botello	27	0	22+4	0	1+0	0
16	MF	(Canada) CAN	Max Ferrari	28	0	25+2	0	1+0	0
23	DF	(Canada) CAN	Noah Abatneh	23	1	20+2	1	1+0	0
30	DF	(Canada) CAN	Kadin Martin-Pereux	14	0	5+9	0	0+0	0
32	DF	(Liberia) LBR	Brem Soumaoro	12	0	10+1	0	1+0	0
62	DF	(Canada) CAN	Nyal Higgins	19	1	13+5	1	0+1	0
Midfielders
7	DF	(Canada) CAN	Juan Córdova	23	3	21+1	3	1+0	0
8	MF	(Canada) CAN	Elijah Adekugbe	30	1	23+6	1	1+0	0
12	MF	(Canada) CAN	Clément Bayiha	5	0	2+2	0	0+1	0
12	MF	(Mexico) MEX	Santiago Márquez	12	0	5+7	0	0+0	0
13	MF	(Canada) CAN	Jason Hartill	2	0	1+1	0	0+0	0
15	MF	(Mexico) MEX	Josué Martínez	29	2	21+7	1	0+1	1
21	MF	(Canada) CAN	Kembo Kibato	5	0	4+1	0	0+0	0
21	MF	(Canada) CAN	Christian Zeppieri	8	0	0+8	0	0+0	0
24	MF	(Canada) CAN	Tomas Giraldo	5	0	2+3	0	0+0	0
26	MF	(Canada) CAN	Joshua Lopez	1	0	0+1	0	0+0	0
27	MF	(Canada) CAN	Lukas Pareja	1	0	0+1	0	0+0	0
33	MF	(Philippines) PHI	Matthew Baldisimo	15	0	9+5	0	0+1	0
37	MF	(Canada) CAN	Trivine Esprit	13	0	2+11	0	0+0	0
Forwards
9	FW	(Canada) CAN	Brian Wright	25	9	23+1	9	1+0	0
10	FW	(Syria) SYR	Molham Babouli	24	7	22+1	7	1+0	0
11	MF	(Liechtenstein) LIE	Dennis Salanović	12	2	6+5	2	0+1	0
14	FW	(Canada) CAN	Theo Afework	0	0	0+0	0	0+0	0
17	MF	(Ukraine) UKR	Markiyan Voytsekhovskyy	14	2	5+9	2	0+0	0
19	FW	(Canada) CAN	Shola Jimoh	16	4	4+12	4	0+0	0
20	FW	(Mexico) MEX	Jorge Guzmán	11	0	11+0	0	0+0	0
22	FW	(Canada) CAN	Austin Ricci	17	4	10+6	4	1+0	0

=== Top scorers ===
Rank	Nat.	Player	Pos.	Canadian Premier League	Canadian Championship	TOTAL
1	(Canada)	Brian Wright	FW	9	0	9
2	(Syria)	Molham Babouli	FW	7	0	7
3	(Canada)	Shola Jimoh	FW	4	0	4
3	(Canada)	Austin Ricci	FW	4	0	4
4	(Canada)	Juan Córdova	MF	3	0	3
5	(Mexico)	Oswaldo León	DF	2	0	2
5	(Mexico)	Josué Martínez	MF	1	1	2
5	(Liechtenstein)	Dennis Salanović	FW	2	0	2
5	(Ukraine)	Markiyan Voytsekhovskyy	MF	2	0	2
6	(Canada)	Noah Abatneh	DF	1	0	1
6	(Canada)	Elijah Adekugbe	MF	1	0	1
6	(Canada)	Nyal Higgins	DF	1	0	1
Totals				37	1	38

Updated to match played Oct 27, 2024
Source: Canadian Premier League

=== Top assists ===
Rank	Nat.	Player	Pos.	Canadian Premier League	Canadian Championship	TOTAL
1	(Canada)	Brian Wright	FW	6	0	6
2	(Mexico)	Jorge Guzmán	FW	5	0	5
3	(Canada)	Juan Córdova	MF	3	0	3
3	(Canada)	Max Ferrari	DF	3	0	3
4	(Canada)	Elijah Adekugbe	MF	2	0	2
4	(Syria)	Molham Babouli	FW	2	0	2
4	(Canada)	Kadin Martin-Pereux	DF	2	0	2
5	(Canada)	Clément Bayiha	MF	1	0	1
5	(Canada)	Nyal Higgins	DF	1	0	1
5	(Canada)	Shola Jimoh	FW	1	0	1
5	(Mexico)	Santiago Márquez	MF	1	0	1
5	(Mexico)	Josué Martínez	MF	1	0	1
5	(Canada)	Austin Ricci	FW	1	0	1
5	(Liberia)	Brem Soumaoro	DF	1	0	1
5	(Ukraine)	Markiyan Voytsekhovskyy	MF	1	0	1
Totals				31	0	31

Updated to match played Oct 27, 2024
Source: Canadian Premier League

=== Clean sheets ===
Rank	Nat.	Player	Canadian Premier League	Canadian Championship	TOTAL
1	(France)	Thomas Vincensini	7	0	7
Totals			7	0	7

Updated to match played Oct 27, 2024
Source: Canadian Premier League

=== Disciplinary record ===
No.	Pos.	Nat.	Player	Canadian Premier League		Canadian Championship		TOTAL	
No.	Pos.	Nat.	Player	Yellow card	Red card	Yellow card	Red card	Yellow card	Red card
1	GK	(France)	Thomas Vincensini	4	0	0	0	4	0
4	DF	(Mexico)	Oswaldo León	6	1	0	0	6	1
5	DF	(Canada)	Frank Sturing	2	0	1	0	3	0
6	DF	(Mexico)	Orlando Botello	14	0	0	0	14	0
7	MF	(Canada)	Juan Córdova	8	0	1	0	9	0
8	MF	(Canada)	Elijah Adekugbe	8	0	1	0	9	0
9	FW	(Canada)	Brian Wright	1	0	0	0	1	0
10	FW	(Syria)	Mo Babouli	3	0	0	0	3	0
11	FW	(Liechtenstein)	Dennis Salanović	3	0	0	0	3	0
12	MF	(Mexico)	Santiago Márquez	2	0	0	0	2	0
15	MF	(Mexico)	Josué Martínez	7	0	0	0	7	0
16	DF	(Canada)	Max Ferrari	7	0	1	0	8	0
17	FW	(Ukraine)	Markiyan Voytsekhovskyy	3	0	0	0	3	0
20	FW	(Ukraine)	Jorge Guzmán	1	1	0	0	1	1
21	MF	(Canada)	Christian Zeppieri	1	0	0	0	1	0
22	FW	(Canada)	Austin Ricci	4	1	0	0	4	1
23	DF	(Canada)	Noah Abatneh	4	0	0	0	4	0
24	MF	(Canada)	Tomas Giraldo	1	0	0	0	1	0
30	MF	(Canada)	Kadin Martin-Pereux	2	0	0	0	2	0
32	DF	(Liberia)	Brem Soumaoro	2	0	0	0	2	0
33	MF	(Philippines)	Matthew Baldisimo	3	0	0	0	3	0
62	DF	(Canada)	Nyal Higgins	4	0	0	0	4	0
67	GK	(Canada)	Michael Williams	1	0	0	0	1	0
Totals				88	3	4	0	92	3

Updated to match played Oct 27, 2024
Source: Canadian Premier League
