= Josué Martínez =

Josué Martínez may refer to:

- Josué Martínez (footballer, born 1990), Costa Rican footballer
- Josué Martínez (footballer, born 2002), Mexican footballer
