= Rafael Márquez (disambiguation) =

Rafael Márquez may refer to:

- Rafael Márquez (born 1979) former Mexican footballer who played as a centre back or defensive midfielder.
- Rafael Márquez (boxer) (born 1975), Mexican professional boxer
- Rafael Márquez Lugo (born 1981), former Mexican footballer who played as a striker
- Rafael Márquez Esqueda (1947–2002), Mexican footballer who played as a defender

== See also ==
- Rafael Marques (disambiguation)
