= Joshua López =

Canadian soccer player (born 2008)

Personal information
- Date of birth: May 26, 2008 (age 18)
- Place of birth: Toronto, Ontario, Canada
- Position: Forward

Team information
- Current team: York United FC
- Number: 26

Youth career
- Vaughan Azzurri
- Toronto FC
- Vaughan Azzurri

Senior career*
Years	Team	Apps	(Gls)
2024–	Inter Toronto FC (Note: York United FC changed its name to Inter Toronto FC in 2026)	5	(0)
2025	→ York United FC Academy	8	(1)
- * Club domestic league appearances and goals as of September 16, 2025

Joshua López (born May 26, 2008) is a Canadian soccer player who plays for Inter Toronto FC in the Canadian Premier League.

== Early life ==
López played youth soccer with Vaughan Azzurri before joining the Toronto FC Academy. He later returned to Vaughan.

== Club career ==
In September 2024, López signed a developmental contract with York United FC in the Canadian Premier League. He made his professional debut on September 28 against Forge FC. He signed another developmental contract for 2025 and would also play for the York United FC Academy team in League1 Ontario Championship.

== International career ==
In July 2025, López was called up to a training camp with the Uruguay U20 team.

== Career statistics ==
As of September 16, 2025

Club	Season	League			Playoffs		Domestic Cup		League Cup		Total	
Club	Season	Division	Apps	Goals	Apps	Goals	Apps	Goals	Apps	Goals	Apps	Goals
York United FC	2024	Canadian Premier League	1	0	0	0	0	0	–		1	0
York United FC	2025	Canadian Premier League	4	0	0	0	1	0	–		5	0
York United FC	Total		5	0	0	0	1	0	0	0	6	0
York United FC Academy	2025	League1 Ontario Championship	8	1	–		–		2	0	10	1
Career total			13	1	0	0	1	0	2	0	16	1
