= Rafael Marques =

Rafael Marques may refer to:

- Rafael Marques (journalist) (born 1971), Angolan journalist and human rights activist
- Rafael Marques (footballer, born May 1983), full name Rafael Marques Mariano, Brazilian football striker
- Rafael Marques (footballer, born September 1983), full name Rafael Marques Pinto, Brazilian football centre-back
- Rafael Marques (footballer, born 1989), Portuguese footballer who plays as a goalkeeper
- Rafaël Marques Dias Brito (born 1991), Portuguese footballer who plays as a midfielder

== See also ==
- Rafael Márquez (disambiguation)
