= Jorge Guzmán (footballer, born 2003) =

Mexican footballer (born 2003)

Personal information
- Full name: Jorge Luis Guzmán Rodríguez
- Date of birth: 13 December 2003 (age 22)
- Place of birth: Puerto Vallarta, Jalisco, Mexico
- Height: 1.73 m (5 ft 8 in)
- Position: Midfielder

Team information
- Current team: Željezničar
- Number: 17

Youth career
- Ixtapa
- Hipocampos Vallarta
- 2017–2022: Atlas

Senior career*
Years	Team	Apps	(Gls)
2022–2025	Atlas	33	(0)
2024	→ York United (loan)	11	(0)
2025–2026	Tapatío	28	(2)
2026	Željezničar	2	(0)
- * Club domestic league appearances and goals as of 2 September 2026

Jorge Luis Guzmán Rodríguez, also known as Vallarta (born 13 December 2003) is a Mexican professional footballer who plays as a midfielder.

== Early life ==
Guzmán began playing football with Ixtapa and Hipocampos Vallarta. In January 2018, he joined the academy of Atlas.

== Club career ==
On 12 September 2022, Guzmán made his professional debut with Atlas in Liga MX against Atlético de San Luis wearing kit number 209. In September 2023, he gave his jersey to a fan who requested it as a birthday present. In July 2024, he was loaned to Canadian Premier League club York United for the remainder of the 2024 season, reuniting with head coach Benjamín Mora, who gave his professional debut while coach of the Atlas first team. He made his debut for York United on 26 July against Atlético Ottawa, recording two assists in a 4–1 victory. He recorded another assist in the next match, becoming the first CPL player to record three assists in their first two matches.

On 30 July 2026, Guzmán signed a two-year contract with Bosnian Premier League side Željezničar. He debuted in a 2–0 away loss to Zrinjski Mostar on 23 August. After playing one more game for Željezničar, he left the club in October, citing "personal reasons."

== International career ==
In April 2021, Guzmán was called up to the Mexico U18. In September 2023, he was called up to the Mexico U20 for the first time.

== Career statistics ==
As of match played 2 September 2026

Club	Season	League			Cup		Continental		Other		Total	
Club	Season	Division	Apps	Goals	Apps	Goals	Apps	Goals	Apps	Goals	Apps	Goals
Atlas	2022–23	Liga MX	4	0	—		—		—		4	0
Atlas	2023–24	Liga MX	18	0	—		—		3 (Note: Appearances in Leagues Cup)	0	21	0
Atlas	2024–25	Liga MX	11	0	—		—		—		11	0
Atlas	Total		33	0	—		—		3	0	36	0
York United (loan)	2024	Canadian Premier League	11	0	—		—		—		11	0
Tapatío	2025–26	Liga de Expansión MX	28	2	—		—		—		28	2
Željezničar	2026–27	Bosnian Premier League	2	0	0	0	—		—		2	0
Career total			74	2	0	0	—		3	0	77	2
