= Markiyan Voytsekhovskyy =

Canadian-Ukrainian soccer player

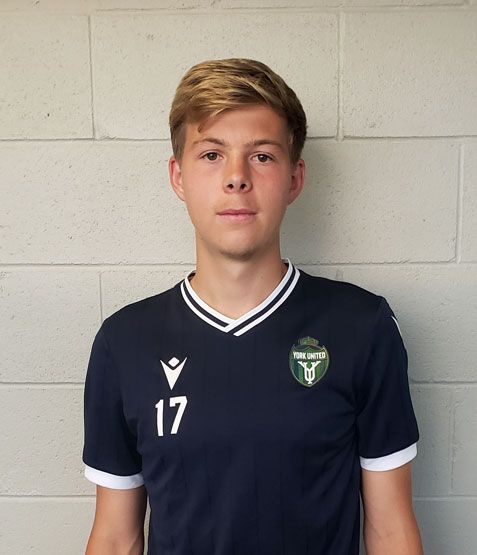
- Voytsekhovskyy in 2024

Personal information
- Date of birth: November 27, 2003 (age 22)
- Place of birth: Lviv, Ukraine
- Height: 1.83 m (6 ft 0 in)
- Position: Midfielder

Youth career
- Shakhtar Donetsk
- Rush Canada Academy
- 2021: Guelph United FC

Senior career*
Years	Team	Apps	(Gls)
2022	ProStars FC	21	(10)
2023–2025	York United FC	23	(3)
2025	→ York United FC Academy (loan)	1	(2)
2025	Valour FC	8	(1)
- * Club domestic league appearances and goals as of October 27, 2025

Markiyan Voytsekhovskyy (Ukrainian: Маркіян Войцеховський; born November 27, 2003) is a Ukrainian professional footballer who plays as a midfielder.

== Early life ==
In his youth, Voytsekhovskyy was part of the Shakhtar Donetsk academy. After moving to Canada, he joined the Rush Canada Academy. In 2021, he played with the Guelph United FC U21 team in the League1 Ontario Reserve division.

== Club career ==
In 2022, Voytsekhovskyy joined League1 Ontario club ProStars. He was named the league's Young Player of the Year, and was named a league First Team All-Star and was named to the U20 Best XI. After the season, he began training with FC Tigers Vancouver.

In December 2022, Voytsekhovskyy signed his first professional contract with York United of the Canadian Premier League for the 2023 season, joining on a two-year contract, with a club option for a further season. On April 16, 2023, he made his professional debut for York, starting in a 2–0 league loss to Valour. On April 22, he scored his first professional goal in a 2–1 league defeat to Vancouver. On June 21, 2023, he suffered a Jones fracture in a match against the HFX Wanderers, causing him to miss the remainder of the season. At the end of the 2024 season, the club picked up his option for the 2025 season.

In July 2025, he moved to Valour FC in a player swap, with Shaan Hundal moving to York United in return, signing for the remainder of 2025 with an option for 2026.

== Career statistics ==
As of October 27, 2025

Club	Season	League			Playoffs		Domestic Cup		Other		Total	
Club	Season	Division	Apps	Goals	Apps	Goals	Apps	Goals	Apps	Goals	Apps	Goals
ProStars FC	2022	League1 Ontario	21	10	1	0	–		–		22	10
York United	2023	Canadian Premier League	7	1	0	0	1	0	–		8	1
York United	2024	Canadian Premier League	14	2	0	0	0	0	–		14	2
York United	2025	Canadian Premier League	2	0	0	0	0	0	–		2	0
York United	Total		23	3	0	0	1	0	0	0	24	3
York United FC Academy (loan)	2025	League1 Ontario Championship	1	2	–		–		0	0	1	2
Valour FC	2025	Canadian Premier League	8	1	–		0	0	–		8	1
Career total			53	16	1	0	1	0	0	0	55	16
