= Austin Ricci =

Canadian soccer player (born 1996)

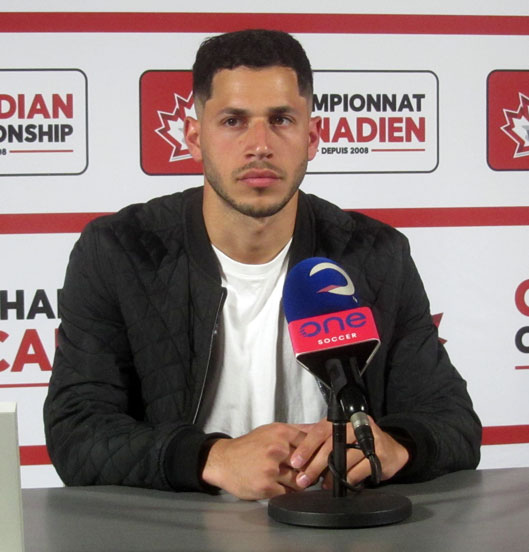
- Austin Ricci in 2023

Personal information
- Date of birth: April 8, 1996 (age 30)
- Place of birth: Richmond Hill, Ontario, Canada
- Height: 1.78 m (5 ft 10 in)
- Position: Forward

Youth career
- Richmond Hill SC
- 2010–2013: Ajax SC

College career
Years	Team	Apps	(Gls)
2014–2017	Oakland Golden Grizzlies	71	(22)

Senior career*
Years	Team	Apps	(Gls)
2014–2015	Vaughan Azzurri		
2016	K-W United FC	7	(3)
2017–2018	Michigan Bucks	28	(17)
2018	Vaughan Azzurri	8	(5)
2019	York9 FC	9	(0)
2020–2021	Valour FC	22	(5)
2022–2024	York United FC	45	(7)
2024	Vancouver FC	3	(0)
- * Club domestic league appearances and goals as of October 5, 2024

Austin Ricci (born April 8, 1996) is a Canadian professional soccer player who plays as a forward.

== Early life ==
Ricci played youth soccer with Richmond Hill SC. In 2010, he joined Ajax SC.

Ricci played high school soccer for the St. Theresa of Lisieux Catholic High School Lions, winning gold at OFSAA in 2014, and being named MVP of the team for three consecutive seasons.

== College career ==
In February 2014, he committed to Oakland University to play for the men's soccer team in the fall. He scored his first goal on September 12, 2014 against the Denver Pioneers. He won the Horizon League with the team in his freshman season in 2014. In 2015, he was named Horizon League Co-Offensive Player of the Year and a Horizon League First-Team All Star, and was named to the NSCAA All-Great Lakes Regional Second Team. In his junior season in 2016, he was named to the NSCAA All-Great Lakes Regional Third Team. In his senior season in 2017, he was named a Horizon League First-Team All-Star.

== Club career ==
In 2014 and 2015, he appeared for Vaughan Azzurri in League1 Ontario.

In 2016, he played for K-W United FC in the Premier Development League. He scored a hat trick in the season opener on May 17 against Toronto FC III.

He played for the Michigan Bucks in the Premier Development League in 2017 and 2018. In 2017, he won the Great Lakes Division with the team. On July 10, 2018, he scored four goals and added four assists in a 14-1 victory over the Derby City Rovers, a performance which earned him PDL Player of the Week honours.

He later returned to Vaughan Azzurri in 2018, scoring six goals in twelve appearances, across the regular season and playoffs, as Vaughan won the league title.

In December 2018, Ricci signed his first professional contract with Canadian Premier League side York 9 FC for the 2019 season. He made 11 appearances for the club in 2019 across all competitions, tallying one assist.

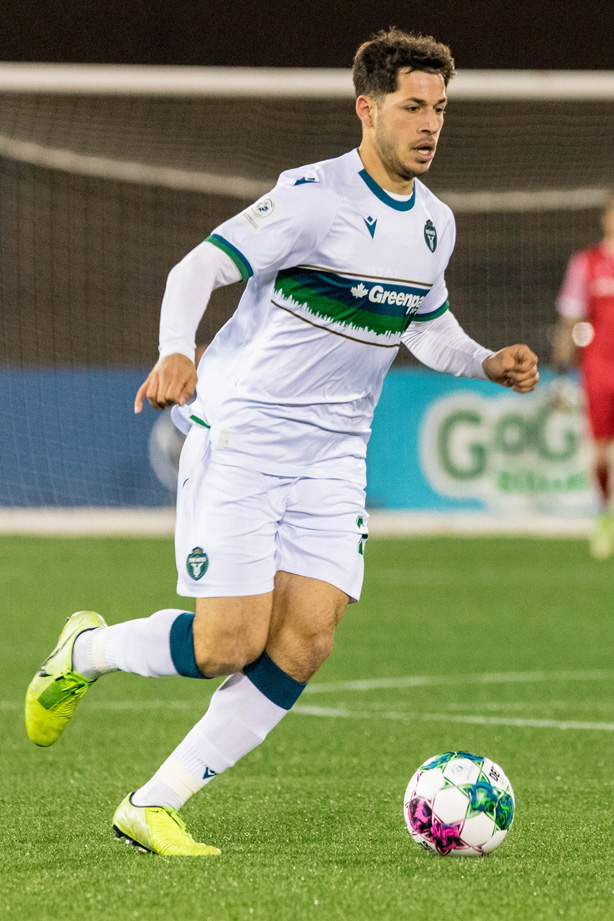
Ricci playing for York United in 2022

In February 2020, he went on trial with Valour FC, also in the Canadian Premier League, and had been set to sign a contract in March, when the COVID-19 pandemic hit, delaying the signing. In July 2020, he officially signed with the club. In his first season with the club, he made six appearances during the shortened season, drawing two earning two penalty kicks for the team. In November 2020, he re-signed with the club. On June 27, 2021, he scored his first professional goal in a match against Forge FC. His second goal gave his team a 1-0 victory over Forge FC on July 11. On July 19, he scored a brace to help Valour to a 3-0 victory over York United FC. He was named to the CPL Team of the Week three times in 2021. On August 22, 2021, he scored a brace against Atlético Ottawa in a Canadian Championship match, to help lead Valour to their first ever victory in the competition. He finished as the top goalscorer in the 2021 Canadian Championship domestic cup competition, winning the Golden Boot, with three goals. His season was cut short after he was injured in a collision with Forge goalkeeper Triston Henry during a match in September.

In March 2022, he went on trial with his former club York United FC (who had previously been York9 during his last stint). In April 2022, he officially signed with the club for the 2022 season. He joined on a one-year contract with club options through 2024. On May 11, he re-aggravated his knee injury against Atlético Ottawa in a Canadian Championship match, forcing him to undergo surgery, causing him to miss the remainder of the season. In October 2022, he re-signed with the club for the 2023 season. Following a red card in a match in June 2024, his playing time began to dip, ultimately leading to the club pushing him to accept a transfer, a move Ricci characterized as "pretty disrespectful".

In September 2024, Ricci was transferred to Vancouver FC, signing a contract through 2024, in a player swap deal with Kembo Kibato moving to York United.

== Career statistics ==
As of match played on October 5, 2024

Club	Season	League			Playoffs		Domestic cup		League cup		Total	
Club	Season	Division	Apps	Goals	Apps	Goals	Apps	Goals	Apps	Goals	Apps	Goals
K-W United FC	2016	Premier Development League	7	3	0	0	—		—		7	3
Michigan Bucks	2017	Premier Development League	14	5	1	0	1	0	—		16	5
Michigan Bucks	2018	Premier Development League	14	12	0	0	0	0	—		14	12
Michigan Bucks	Total		28	17	1	0	1	0	—		30	17
Vaughan Azzurri	2018	League1 Ontario	8	5	4	1	—		0	0	12	6
York9 FC	2019	Canadian Premier League	9	0	—		2	0	—		11	0
Valour FC	2020	Canadian Premier League	6	0	—		—		—		6	0
Valour FC	2021	Canadian Premier League	16	5	—		2	3	—		18	8
Valour FC	Total		22	5	—		2	3	—		24	8
York United FC	2022	Canadian Premier League	3	0	—		1	0	—		4	0
York United FC	2023	Canadian Premier League	26	3	0	0	2	0	—		28	3
York United FC	2024	Canadian Premier League	16	4	0	0	1	0	—		17	4
York United FC	Total		45	7	0	0	4	0	—		49	7
Vancouver FC	2024	Canadian Premier League	3	0	—		0	0	—		3	0
Career total			120	37	5	1	9	3	0	0	134	41
