= Juan Córdova =

Canadian-Chilean soccer player (born 1995)

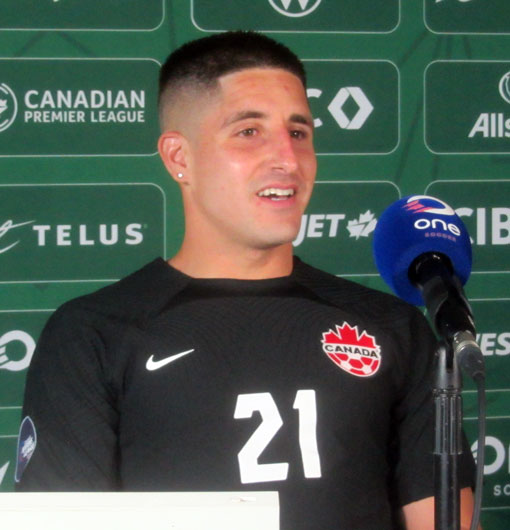
- Córdova with York United in 2024

Personal information
- Full name: Juan Guillermo Córdova Torres
- Date of birth: 25 June 1995 (age 31)
- Place of birth: Los Andes, Chile
- Height: 1.65 m (5 ft 5 in)
- Position: Full-back

Team information
- Current team: Inter Toronto FC
- Number: 23

Youth career
- Nogales
- Unión San Felipe

Senior career*
Years	Team	Apps	(Gls)
2013–2017	Unión San Felipe	57	(1)
2017–2022	Huachipato	95	(0)
2023	Ñublense	8	(0)
2024	York United	22	(3)
2025	Unión San Felipe	26	(1)
2026–	Inter Toronto FC	24	(1)

International career^{‡}
2014	Chile U20	5	(0)
2017	Canada U23	2	(0)
2017	Canada	2	(0)
- * Club domestic league appearances and goals as of 31 October 2026 ‡ National team caps and goals as of 8 October 2017

Juan Guillermo Córdova Torres (born 25 June 1995) is a professional soccer player who plays as a full-back for Canadian Premier League club Inter Toronto. Born in Chile, he has represented the Canada national team.

== Club career ==
Córdova joined Unión San Felipe at the age of 16. He scored his first league goal for the club against Rangers on 21 January 2017.

In May 2017, Córdova joined Huachipato of the Chilean Primera División.

In December 2022, Córdova departed Huachipato and joined fellow Chilean side Ñublense.

On 4 January 2024, he signed with Canadian Premier League club York United on a one-year deal, plus a club option for a further twelve months.

Back in Chile, Córdova signed with Unión San Felipe in January 2025 until the end of the season.

In February 2026, Córdova returned to Canada and rejoined Inter Toronto, formerly called York United.

== International career ==
Born in Chile, Córdova holds a Canadian passport through his father, who was also born in Chile, but is a Canadian citizen. He represented Chile at the U-20 level, making 5 appearances in 2014. Córdova was called up to the Canadian U-23 side for the 2017 Aspire tournament held in Qatar on 19 March 2017. He made his debut against Uzbekistan on 25 March in a 1–0 win.

In May 2017 Córdova was called up to the senior team for a friendly against Curaçao.

In May 2019, Córdova was called up to the 40-man provisional squad for the 2019 CONCACAF Gold Cup.

== Career statistics ==
As of match played 27 October 2024

Appearances and goals by club, season and competition
Club	League	Season	League		Playoffs		Domestic Cup		Continental		Total	
Club	League	Season	Apps	Goals	Apps	Goals	Apps	Goals	Apps	Goals	Apps	Goals
Unión San Felipe	Primera B	2013–14	2	0	—		0	0	—		2	0
Unión San Felipe	Primera B	2014–15	17	0	—		2	0	—		19	0
Unión San Felipe	Primera B	2015–16	15	0	—		4	1	—		19	1
Unión San Felipe	Primera B	2016–17	23	1	—		2	0	—		25	1
Unión San Felipe	Total		57	1	0	0	8	1	0	0	65	2
Huachipato	Chilean Primera División	2017	7	0	—		6	1	—		13	1
Huachipato	Chilean Primera División	2018	16	0	—		3	0	—		19	0
Huachipato	Chilean Primera División	2019	16	0	—		2	0	—		18	0
Huachipato	Chilean Primera División	2020	16	0	—		0	0	3	0	19	0
Huachipato	Chilean Primera División	2021	23	0	—		7	0	7	0	37	0
Huachipato	Chilean Primera División	2022	17	0	—		4	0	0	0	21	0
Huachipato	Total		95	0	0	0	22	1	10	0	127	1
Ñublense	Chilean Primera División	2023	8	0	—		1	0	—		9	0
York United FC	Canadian Premier League	2024	20	3	2	0	1	0	—		23	3
Career total			180	1	2	0	31	2	11	0	224	6

== Personal life ==
Córdova was born in Chile and lived with his father's family in Canada. Eventually, he returned to Chile along with his mother. Since the age of five, he has held dual Chilean-Canadian citizenship.
