= Rafael Márquez Esqueda =

Mexican footballer (1947-2002)

Personal information
- Full name: Rafael Márquez Esqueda
- Date of birth: 12 October 1947
- Place of birth: Zamora, Michoacán, Mexico
- Date of death: 11 October 2002 (aged 54)
- Place of death: Guadalajara, Mexico
- Height: 1.74 m (5 ft 9 in)
- Position: Defender

Senior career*
Years	Team	Apps	(Gls)
?	Zamora	?	(?)
?	Oro	?	(?)
?	Querétaro	?	(?)
?	San Luis	?	(?)
1972–1973	Tigres UANL	?	(?)
1973–1975	Irapuato	?	(?)
- * Club domestic league appearances and goals

Rafael Márquez Esqueda (12 October 1947 – 11 October 2002) was a Mexican professional footballer who played as a defender. He is the father of footballer Rafael Márquez and grandfather of Santiago Márquez. He married Rosa Maria Álvarez.

He died of a liver ailment on 10 October 2002 at age 54 in Guadalajara, Jalisco.
