= Shola Jimoh =

Canadian soccer player (born 2008)

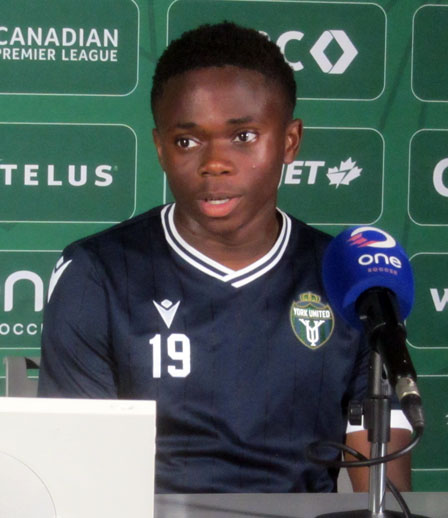
- Jimoh in 2024

Personal information
- Full name: Olusola El-Ameen Opemipo Jimoh
- Date of birth: April 8, 2008 (age 18)
- Place of birth: Newcastle upon Tyne, England
- Height: 1.68 m (5 ft 6 in)
- Position: Forward

Team information
- Current team: Inter Toronto FC
- Number: 19

Youth career
- Brampton East SC
- Toronto FC
- 2023: United Football Academy

Senior career*
Years	Team	Apps	(Gls)
2023–	Inter Toronto FC (Note: York United FC changed its name to Inter Toronto FC in 2026)	46	(3)

International career^{‡}
2023	Canada U15	4	(0)
2024	Canada U17	14	(4)
2025–	Canada U20	8	(1)
2026	Canada B	1	(0)
- * Club domestic league appearances and goals as of October 31, 2026 ‡ National team caps and goals as of June 6, 2026

Olusola El-Ameen Opemipo "Shola" Jimoh (born April 8, 2008) is a soccer player who plays as a forward for Inter Toronto FC in the Canadian Premier League. Born in England, he represents Canada at youth level.

== Early life ==
Jimoh was born in Newcastle-Upon-Tyne, England and grew up in Brampton, Ontario, Canada. Jimoh began playing soccer after a teacher at school spotted him playing in the schoolyard and recommended to his parents to register him in the sport.

He then began playing with Brampton East SC at age six. He later joined the Toronto FC Academy, followed by a stint with the United Football Academy.

== Club career ==
In September 2023, Jimoh signed a developmental contract with York United FC in the Canadian Premier League.

In June 2024, he signed an Exceptional Young Talent contract with the club through 2026, with an option for 2027. On June 9, 2024, he made his professional debut in a substitute appearance against Vancouver FC.

He scored his first goal on July 13 against Cavalry FC, becoming the league's second-youngest ever goal-scorer at 16 years and 96 days of age (behind T.J. Tahid).

On September 13, 2024, he started his first professional match, scoring his second goal, in a 1-1 draw with Valour FC. In his first season, he scored four goals across all competitions, of which two were game-winning goals, while also recording one assist.

== International career ==
Jimoh was born in England to Nigerian parents, and moved to Canada at a young age. He holds dual Canadian and British citizenship. He played with the Canada U15 at the 2023 CONCACAF Boys' Under-15 Championship.

In November 2024, Jimoh was called to a training camp with the Canada senior team for the first time, as a 16 year old, being the only non-MLS player called to the North American-based player camp. Immediately following the senior camp, he joined the Canada U17 for a pair of international friendlies.

He made his debut in the first match against Costa Rica U17, followed by scoring his first international goal for Canada with the U17s in the next match on November 18, in a friendly against Mexico U17.

In January 2026, he was called up to the Canada senior team, ahead of a friendly against Guatemala. He started in the match against Guatemala, however, as it was designated a B-level friendly, it did not count as an official senior cap.

== Career statistics ==
As of July 24, 2026

Club	Season	League			Playoffs		Domestic Cup		Continental		Total	
Club	Season	Division	Apps	Goals	Apps	Goals	Apps	Goals	Apps	Goals	Apps	Goals
Inter Toronto FC	2024	Canadian Premier League	14	3	2	1	0	0	–		16	4
Inter Toronto FC	2025	Canadian Premier League	22	0	1	0	2	0	–		25	0
Inter Toronto FC	2026	Canadian Premier League	8	0	0	0	1	0	–		9	0
Career total			44	3	3	1	3	0	0	0	50	4
