= Dennis Salanović =

Liechtensteiner footballer (born 1996)

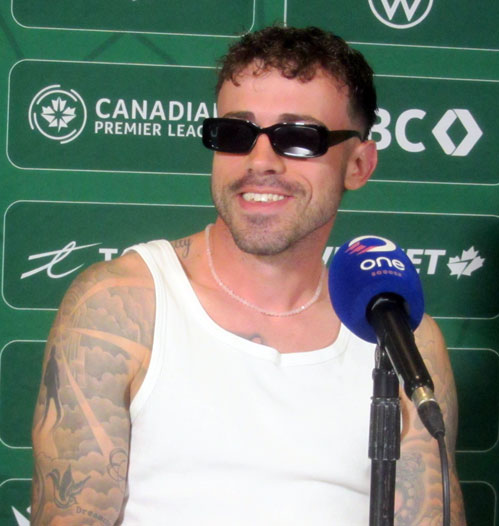
- Salanović in 2024

Personal information
- Date of birth: 26 February 1996 (age 30)
- Place of birth: Vaduz, Liechtenstein
- Height: 1.79 m (5 ft 10 in)
- Position: Winger

Team information
- Current team: FC Linth 04
- Number: 10

Youth career
- 2002–2013: FC Schaan
- 2014–2015: Atlético Madrid

Senior career*
Years	Team	Apps	(Gls)
2013–2014	FC Schaan	15	(7)
2015	Istra 1961	8	(0)
2015	→ Istra 1961 B	4	(0)
2016	FC Balzers	12	(8)
2016–2018	FC Rapperswil-Jona	53	(7)
2018–2021	FC Thun	72	(7)
2021	→ AC Oulu (loan)	13	(4)
2022	AC Oulu	4	(1)
2022–2023	Lahti	6	(0)
2023	Talavera	4	(0)
2024	York United	11	(2)
2025–2026	FC Balzers	6	(4)
2026–	FC Linth 04	3	(0)

International career^{‡}
2014–2018	Liechtenstein U21	9	(1)
2014–	Liechtenstein	67	(4)
- * Club domestic league appearances and goals as of 6 June 2026 ‡ National team caps and goals as of 7 June 2026

Dennis Salanović (born 26 February 1996) is a Liechtensteiner professional footballer who plays as a winger for Swiss 2. Liga Interregional club Linth 04 and the Liechtenstein national team.

== Club career ==
In 2018, Salanović joined the Swiss club, FC Thun.

After playing for AC Oulu in Finland on loan in the 2021 season, on 7 December 2021, he agreed to return to the club on a permanent basis for 2022. On 27 June 2022, Oulu announced that Salanović had left the club as his contract expired and the option to extend was not exercised.

On 4 August 2022, he joined fellow Finnish team, Lahti.

On 9 March 2023, he joined Spanish side Talavera.

On 3 January 2024, Salanović joined Canadian Premier League team York United on a one-year deal, with an option for 2025. After the season, the club declined his option for 2025.

Following his release from Toronto, he returned to play with FC Balzers in the Swiss 2. Liga Interregional. His second stint with Balzers was short-lived, as he left the club in January 2026.

== International career ==
Salanović played his first international game with the senior national team on 4 September 2014 in and against Bosnia and Herzegovina (3–0), after he came on as a substitute for Philippe Erne in the 63rd minute of that game. At the time of his senior debut for Liechtenstein, rumors were abound that Salanović had chosen to represent Bosnia and Herzegovina over the country of his birth, however, four days later, Salanović appeared in Liechtenstein's starting 11 for their UEFA Euro 2016 qualifying match against Russia, thus permanently cap-tying him to the principality. In 2019, Salanović was voted Liechtenstein Footballer of the Year.

== Career statistics ==
=== Club ===
As of 27 October 2024.

Appearances and goals by club, season and competition
Club	Season	League			Cup (Note: Includes Croatian Cup, Swiss Cup, Suomen Cup, Canadian Championship)		League cup (Note: Includes Finnish League Cup)		Other		Total	
Club	Season	Division	Apps	Goals	Apps	Goals	Apps	Goals	Apps	Goals	Apps	Goals
Schaan	2013–14	Swiss 2. Liga	15	7	–		–		–		15	7
Istra 1961	2014–15	1. HNL	6	0	1	0	–		–		7	0
Istra 1961	2015–16	1. HNL	2	0	0	0	–		–		2	0
Istra 1961	Total		8	0	1	0	0	0	0	0	9	0
Balzers	2015–16	Swiss 1. Liga	12	8	–		–		–		12	8
Rapperswil-Jona	2016–17	Swiss Promotion League	23	5	1	0	–		–		24	5
Rapperswil-Jona	2017–18	Swiss Challenge League	30	2	2	0	–		–		32	2
Rapperswil-Jona	Total		53	7	3	0	0	0	0	0	56	7
Thun	2018–19	Swiss Super League	30	5	6	1	–		–		36	6
Thun	2019–20	Swiss Super League	19	1	2	0	–		2 (Note: Appearances in UEFA Europa League)	0	23	1
Thun	2020–21	Swiss Challenge League	25	2	0	0	–		–		25	2
Thun	Total		74	8	8	1	0	0	2	0	84	9
AC Oulu (loan)	2021	Veikkausliiga	15	5	–		–		–		15	5
AC Oulu	2022	Veikkausliiga	4	1	0	0	1	0	–		5	1
Lahti	2022	Veikkausliiga	7	0	1	0	0	0	–		8	0
Talavera	2022–23	Primera Federación	4	0	–		–		–		4	0
York United	2024	Canadian Premier League	9	2	1	0	–		2	0	12	2
Career total			201	38	14	1	1	0	2	0	220	39

=== International goals ===
Scores and results list Liechtenstein's goal tally first.

#	Date	Venue	Opponent	Score	Result	Competition
1.	14 December 2017	Hamad bin Khalifa Stadium, Doha, Qatar	Qatar	1–1	2–1	Friendly
2.	9 September 2018	Rheinpark Stadion, Vaduz, Liechtenstein	Gibraltar	1–0	2–0	2018–19 UEFA Nations League D
3.	16 October 2018	Victoria Stadium, Gibraltar	Gibraltar	1–0	1–2	2018–19 UEFA Nations League D
4.	8 September 2019	Olympic Stadium, Athens, Greece	Greece	1–1	1–1	UEFA Euro 2020 qualification

== Personal life ==
Salanović's family is from Bosnia and Herzegovina. They moved to Liechtenstein during the Bosnian War.

== Honours ==
Individual

- Liechtensteiner Footballer of the Year: 2019
