= Clément Bayiha =

Canadian soccer player (born 1999)

Personal information
- Full name: Clément Yvan Landry Bayiha
- Date of birth: March 8, 1999 (age 27)
- Place of birth: Yaoundé, Cameroon
- Height: 1.74 m (5 ft 8 1/2 in)
- Position: Defender

Team information
- Current team: FC Supra du Québec
- Number: 12

Youth career
- US Bain de Bretagne
- AS Blainville
- 2016–2018: Montreal Impact

Senior career*
Years	Team	Apps	(Gls)
2018	Ottawa Fury	2	(0)
2018	→ Montreal Impact (loan)	0	(0)
2019–2021	CF Montréal (Note: Montreal Impact changed its name to CF Montréal in 2021)	25	(0)
2022	HamKam	8	(0)
2023–2024	York United	31	(2)
2024	→ HFX Wanderers (loan)	18	(0)
2025	Þór Akureyri	18	(3)
2026–	FC Supra du Québec	7	(0)

International career^{‡}
2018	Canada U20	5	(1)
2018	Canada U21	2	(0)
- * Club domestic league appearances and goals as of June 29, 2026 ‡ National team caps and goals as of November 10, 2018

Clément Yvan Landry Bayiha (born March 8, 1999) is a soccer player who plays for FC Supra du Québec in the Canadian Premier League. Born in Cameroon, he represented Canada at youth international level.

== Early life ==
Born in Cameroon, he moved to Guipry, France at the age of five with his family. He began playing youth soccer in France at age eight with US Bain de Bretagne. At age 11, he moved to Ste-Thérèse, Quebec in Canada with his family. In Canada, he played youth soccer with AS Blainville, before joining the Montreal Impact Academy in 2016. In 2018, he attended pre-season training camp with the Montreal Impact first team.

== Club career ==
In July 2018, Bayiha signed a contract with Ottawa Fury FC in the USL for the remainder of the season, immediately being sent on a short-term loan for a few days to the Montreal Impact. He made his professional debut with the Fury a month later on August 22 against the Bethlehem Steel. He made two appearances with the Fury, before departing the club.

In November 2018, Bayiha signed a homegrown player contract with the Montreal Impact (later renamed CF Montréal) of Major League Soccer. After the 2021 season, CF Montreal would announce that they would not exercise the option on Bayiha's contract, ending his time with the club after three seasons.

In January 2022, Bayiha joined HamKam of the Norwegian Eliteserien. At the end of the season, he departed the club, choosing to return to Canada following limited playing time.

In January 2023, Bayiha signed a two-year contract with Canadian Premier League side York United. However, he suffered an injury at the beginning of the season, delaying his debut. On May 28, he scored his first goal in a 1-0 victory over Cavalry FC. In May 2024, he was loaned to HFX Wanderers FC for the remainder of the season, as part of a loan swap with Tomas Giraldo heading on loan in the opposite direction.

On February 27, 2025, Bayiha signed a two-year contract with Þór Akureyri in the Icelandic 1. deild karla.

In January 2026, he signed with FC Supra du Québec in the Canadian Premier League, on a one-year contract with an option for 2027.

== International career ==
In 2017, he was called up to a Quebec-Canada U20 team to play friendlies against Haiti U20, who were preparing for the 2017 Jeux de la Francophonie.

In January 2018, he made his debut in the Canadian national program, attending a camp with the Canada U23 team. On June 3, he made his international debut with Canada U21 at the 2018 Toulon Tournament against Japan. He was then subsequently named to the Canada U20 roster for the 2018 CONCACAF U-20 Championship.

== Career statistics ==
As of match played October 19, 2024

Appearances and goals by club, season and competition
Club	Season	League			Playoffs		National Cup		Continental		Total	
Club	Season	Division	Apps	Goals	Apps	Goals	Apps	Goals	Apps	Goals	Apps	Goals
Ottawa Fury	2018	USL	2	0	—		0	0	—		2	0
Montreal Impact (loan)	2018	Major League Soccer	0	0	—		0	0	—		0	0
CF Montréal	2019	Major League Soccer	11	0	—		5	0	—		16	0
CF Montréal	2020	Major League Soccer	4	0	0	0	—		0	0	4	0
CF Montréal	2021	Major League Soccer	10	0	—		2	0	—		12	0
CF Montréal	Total		25	0	0	0	7	0	0	0	32	0
HamKam	2022	Eliteserien	8	0	—		0	0	—		8	0
York United	2023	Canadian Premier League	27	2	1	0	2	0	—		30	2
York United	2024	Canadian Premier League	4	0	0	0	1	0	—		5	0
York United	Total		31	2	1	0	3	0	0	0	35	2
HFX Wanderers (loan)	2024	Canadian Premier League	18	0	—		0	0	—		18	0
Career total			84	2	1	0	10	0	0	0	95	2

== Honours ==
Montreal Impact

- Canadian Championship: 2019, 2021
