= Tomas Giraldo =

Canadian soccer player (born 2003)

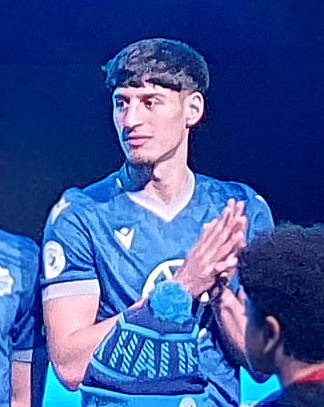

Personal information
- Full name: Tomas Giraldo Ortiz
- Date of birth: March 8, 2003 (age 23)
- Place of birth: Medellín, Colombia
- Height: 1.84 m (6 ft 0 in)
- Position: Midfielder

Youth career
- Instituto Jorge Robledo
- CS Braves d'Ahuntsic
- FS Salaberry
- 2015–2020: Montreal Impact

Senior career*
Years	Team	Apps	(Gls)
2020–2022	CF Montréal (Note: Montreal Impact changed its name to CF Montréal in 2021)	0	(0)
2021	→ FC Edmonton (loan)	0	(0)
2023–2024	HFX Wanderers	20	(2)
2024	→ York United FC (loan)	5	(0)

International career^{‡}
2019	Canada U17	6	(0)
- * Club domestic league appearances and goals as of September 28, 2024 ‡ National team caps and goals as of October 29, 2019

Tomas Giraldo Ortiz (born March 8, 2003) is a soccer player. Born in Colombia, he represented Canada at youth international level.

== Early life ==
Ortiz began playing youth soccer at age six, in his native Colombia, with Instituto Jorge Robledo. At age eight, he moved to Canada with his family and began playing with CS Braves d'Ahuntsic. Afterwards, he joined FS Salaberry. In 2015, he joined the Montreal Impact Academy.

== Club career ==
In June 2020, he signed a professional contract with the Montreal Impact (later renamed CF Montréal) as a homegrown player. In 2021, he went on loan with FC Edmonton of the Canadian Premier League. However, he was unable to appear for Edmonton, after suffering an injury that kept him out for the entire season. In July 2022, he suffered a Jones fracture in his right foot, forcing his to miss the remainder of the 2022 season with Montreal. After the 2022 season, he won CF Montréal's new Jason Di Tullio Trophy, voted on by the player's in honour of the former assistant coach to the player who best demonstrated his courage and resolve.

In February 2023, he signed a contract with the HFX Wanderers of the Canadian Premier League for the 2023 season, with club options for the following two seasons. He made his debut in a substitute appearance on May 20 against York United FC. On August 26, 2023, he scored his first professional goal, in a victory over Valour FC. On September 18, he scored the game-winning goal in stoppage time, to give the Wanderers a 3–2 victory over Atlético Ottawa. In May 2024, he was loaned to York United FC with a purchase option, as part of a loan swap with Clément Bayiha heading on loan in the opposite direction.

== International career ==
Born in Colombia and spending much of his youth in Canada, Giraldo is eligible to represent both national teams.

He made his debut in the Canadian national program at a Canada U17 camp in March 2019. He was subsequently named to the roster for the 2019 CONCACAF U-17 Championship and 2019 FIFA U-17 World Cup. He made one appearance at the U17 World Cup, coming on as a substitute against Angola.
