= Santiago Márquez =

Mexican footballer (born 2003)

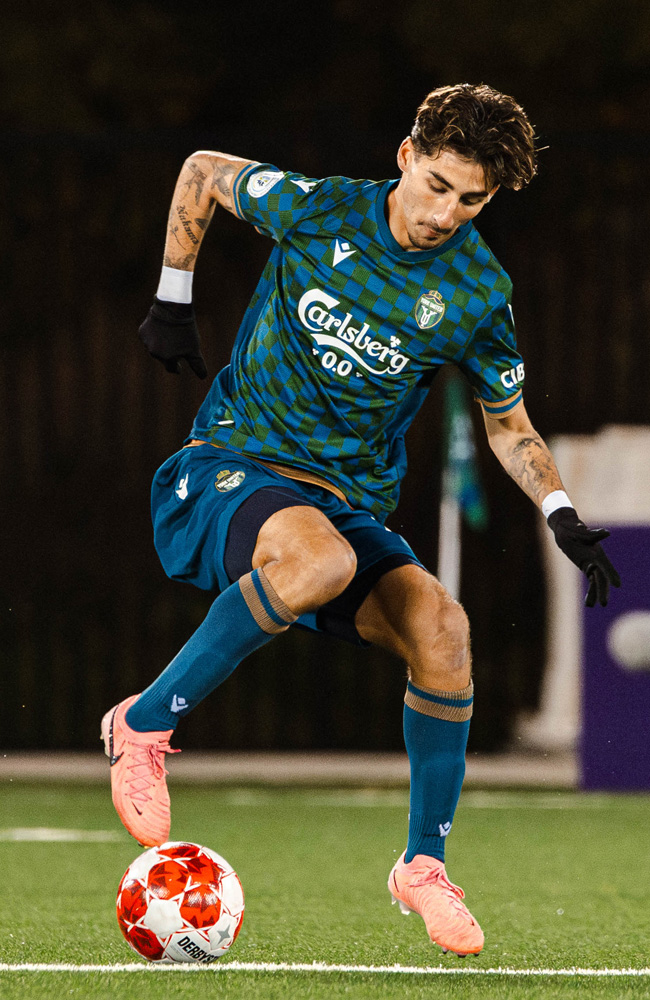
- Marquez playing with York United in 2024

Personal information
- Full name: Santiago Rafael Márquez Lavat
- Date of birth: 13 December 2003 (age 22)
- Place of birth: Centre-Val de Loire, France
- Position: Midfielder

Youth career
- Pumas UNAM
- 2019–2022: Atlas
- 2023–2024: Necaxa

Senior career*
Years	Team	Apps	(Gls)
2024–2025	Necaxa	0	(0)
2024	→ York United (loan)	10	(0)
2025	Atlante	0	(0)
Total		10	(0)
- * Club domestic league appearances and goals

Santiago Rafael Márquez Lavat (born 17 January 2003) is a Mexican former professional footballer.

== Early life ==
The son of Mexican footballer Rafa Márquez, he was born in France, while his father was playing for Monaco. He began his youth career in Mexico with Pumas UNAM. In 2019, he joined the youth system of Atlas. At the beginning of 2023, he joined the youth system of Necaxa.

== Club career ==
On 3 March 2023, Márquez was called up to the matchday squad of Necaxa for a Liga MX match for the first time, although he did not make an appearance. In August 2024, he was loaned to Canadian Premier League club York United FC for the remainder of the 2024 season. He made his debut for York United on 16 August 2024 against Cavalry FC. After the 2024 season, he returned to his parent club, upon the conclusion of his loan.

In February 2025, he signed with Atlante in the Liga de Expansión MX.

In May 2025, he decided to retire from professional football at the age of 22.

== Personal life ==
He is the son of Mexican football player Rafa Márquez (son of footballer Rafael Márquez Esqueda) and actress Adriana Lavat (daughter of actor Jorge Lavat).

== Career statistics ==
As of 26 May 2025

Club	Season	League			Playoffs		National cup		Other		Total	
Club	Season	Division	Apps	Goals	Apps	Goals	Apps	Goals	Apps	Goals	Apps	Goals
Necaxa	2024–25	Liga MX	0	0	–		–		0	0	0	0
York United FC (loan)	2024	Canadian Premier League	10	0	2	0	0	0	–		12	0
Atlante	2024–25	Liga de Expansión MX	0	0	–		–		–		0	0
Career total			10	0	2	0	0	0	0	0	12	0
