= Oswaldo León =

Mexican footballer (born 1999)

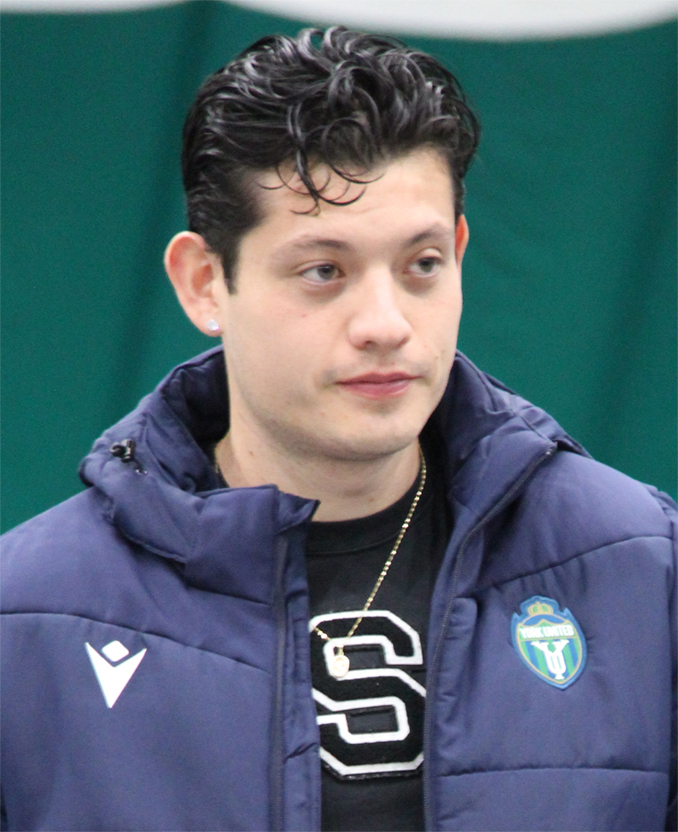
- León in 2024

Personal information
- Full name: Oswaldo Jesús León Montoya
- Date of birth: 15 June 1999 (age 27)
- Place of birth: Santa Cruz de Juventino Rosas, Mexico
- Height: 1.88 m (6 ft 2 in)
- Position: Centre-back

Team information
- Current team: Inter Toronto FC
- Number: 4

Youth career
- Celaya
- 2016–2018: América

Senior career*
| Years | Team | Apps | (Gls) |
| 2018–2021 | América | 0 | (50) |
| 2019–2020 | → Zacatepec (loan) | 9 | (0) |
| 2020–2021 | → Cancún (loan) | 21 | (0) |
| 2021–2022 | Tlaxcala | 23 | (0) |
| 2022–2023 | Venados | 22 | (0) |
| 2023 | Dorados de Sinaloa | 7 | (0) |
| 2024– | York United / Inter Toronto | 57 | (1) |

International career
| 2018–2019 | Mexico U20 | 7 | (0) |
- * Club domestic league appearances and goals as of 31 October 2026

Oswaldo Jesús León Montoya (born 15 June 1999) is a Mexican professional footballer who plays as a centre-back for Inter Toronto in the Canadian Premier League.

== Early life ==
León was born in Santa Cruz de Juventino Rosas, Mexico. He began playing youth football with Celaya. In 2016, he joined the Club América U17 team.

== Club career ==
On 31 July 2018, León made his senior debut with Club América in a Copa MX match against Veracruz, as a substitute.

In June 2019, he was loaned to Atlético Zacatepec in the Ascenso MX. On 21 September 2019, he made his debut for Zacatepec against Correcaminos UAT.

In April 2020, he returned to América after the Mexican federation cancelled the Ascenso MX division as part of a league system restructuring. In July 2020, he went on loan with Cancún in the Liga de Expansión MX.

In June 2021, he signed with Tlaxcala. In June 2022, he signed with Venados. In July 2023, he signed with Dorados de Sinaloa.

In January 2024, he signed with Canadian Premier League club York United FC. He scored his first goal for the club on 10 October against Pacific FC. At the end of the 2024 season, he signed another one-year contract for 2025, with an option for 2026.

== International career ==
León played with the Mexico U20 at the 2018 CONCACAF U-20 Championship and then again at the 2019 FIFA U-20 World Cup.

== Career statistics ==
As of 27 October 2025

| Club | Season | League | | | Playoffs | | National Cup | | Continental | | Total | | |
| Club | Season | Division | Apps | Goals | Apps | Goals | Apps | Goals | Apps | Goals | Apps | Goals | |
|---|---|---|---|---|---|---|---|---|---|---|---|---|---|
| América | 2018–19 | Liga MX | 0 | 0 | – | | 4 | 0 | – | | 4 | 0 | |
| Zacatepec (loan) | 2019–20 | Ascenso MX | 9 | 0 | – | | 4 | 0 | – | | 13 | 0 | |
| Cancún (loan) | 2020–21 | Liga de Expansión MX | 21 | 0 | – | | – | | – | | 21 | 0 | |
| Tlaxcala | 2021–22 | Liga de Expansión MX | 23 | 0 | – | | – | | – | | 23 | 0 | |
| Venados | 2022–23 | Liga de Expansión MX | 22 | 0 | – | | – | | – | | 22 | 0 | |
| Dorados de Sinaloa | 2023–24 | Liga de Expansión MX | 7 | 0 | – | | – | | – | | 7 | 0 | |
| York United / Inter Toronto | 2024 | Canadian Premier League | 18 | 1 | 2 | 1 | 0 | 0 | – | | 20 | 2 | |
| York United / Inter Toronto | 2024 | Canadian Premier League | Canadian Premier League | 19 | 0 | 0 | 0 | 3 | 0 | – | | 22 | 0 |
| York United / Inter Toronto | Career total | | Canadian Premier League | 119 | 1 | 2 | 1 | 11 | 0 | 0 | 0 | 132 | 2 |
