= Josué Martínez (footballer, born 2002) =

Mexican footballer (born 2004)

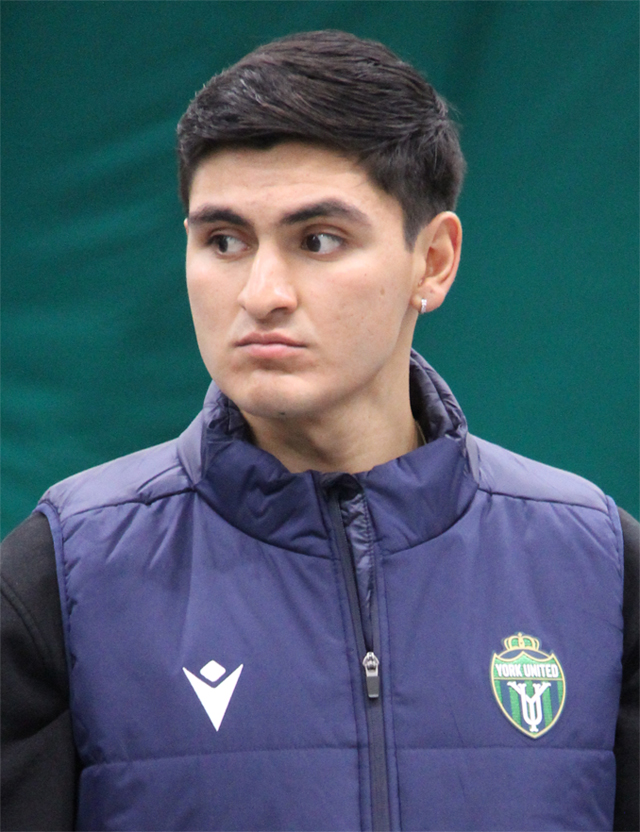
- Martínez in 2024

Personal information
- Full name: Édgar Josué Martínez Huerta
- Date of birth: 28 March 2002 (age 24)
- Place of birth: Saltillo, Mexico
- Height: 1.71 m (5 ft 7 1/2 in)
- Position: Midfielder

Team information
- Current team: Atlético Morelia
- Number: 8

Youth career
- Monterrey

Senior career*
Years	Team	Apps	(Gls)
2021–2024	Monterrey	0	(0)
2021–2023	→ Raya2 Expansión	50	(0)
2024	→ York United FC (loan)	26	(1)
2025–	Atlético Morelia	55	(1)

International career^{‡}
2019	Mexico U17	14+	(0)
2019	Mexico U18	3	(0)
Medal record
Men's football
Representing Mexico
FIFA U-17 World Cup
Runner-up	2019 Brazil	Team
CONCACAF U-17 Championship
Winner	2019 United States
- * Club domestic league appearances and goals as of 21 September 2026 ‡ National team caps and goals as of 26 June 2022

Édgar Josué Martínez Huerta (born 28 March 2002) is a Mexican professional footballer who plays for Atlético Morelia in the Liga de Expansión MX.

== Early life ==
Martínez joined the youth sides of Monterrey at U13 level.

== Club career ==
Martínez began his senior career playing with Raya2 Expansión, the second team of Monterrey, in the second tier Liga de Expansión MX. In February 2024, he was loaned to York United FC in the Canadian Premier League for the 2024 season. On 1 May 2024, he scored his first goal for York United in a 2024 Canadian Championship match against Forge FC.

In December 2024, he joined Atlético Morelia in the Liga de Expansión MX for the 2025 Clausura.

== International career ==
Martínez represented the Mexico U17 at the 2019 CONCACAF U-17 Championship, winning the title, and at the 2019 FIFA U-17 World Cup, where they finished as runner-ups, also appearing in a couple of other U17 friendly tournaments. He also made three appearances with the Mexico U18 team.

== Personal life ==
He is the younger brother of fellow footballer Jaziel Martínez. Alongside his brother, he formed a youth football academy known as Jabatos in 2022, in his hometown of Saltillo.

== Career statistics ==
As of 27 October 2024

Club	Season	League			Playoffs		National cup		Continental		Total	
Club	Season	Division	Apps	Goals	Apps	Goals	Apps	Goals	Apps	Goals	Apps	Goals
Raya2 Expansión	2021–22	Liga de Expansión MX	27	0	–		–		–		27	0
Raya2 Expansión	2022–23	Liga de Expansión MX	23	0	–		–		–		23	0
Raya2 Expansión	Total		50	0	–		–		–		50	0
York United FC (loan)	2024	Canadian Premier League	26	1	2	0	1	1	–		29	2
Career total			76	1	2	0	1	1	0	0	79	2
