= Benjamín Mora =

Mexican football manager

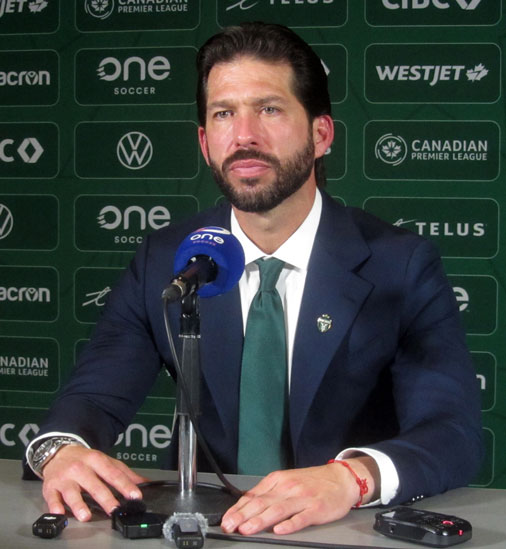
- Mora in 2024

Personal information
- Full name: Benjamín Mora Mendívil
- Date of birth: 25 June 1979 (age 47)
- Place of birth: Mexico City, Mexico

Team information
- Current team: Pachuca (head coach)

Managerial career
- Years: Team
- 2011–2012: Tijuana Reserves
- 2012: Querétaro (assistant)
- 2013: Atlante (assistant)
- 2014–2015: Atlético Chiapas
- 2015: Tapachula (assistant)
- 2015–2016: Johor Darul Ta'zim II
- 2017: Johor Darul Ta'zim
- 2017–2018: Johor Darul Ta'zim II
- 2020–2022: Johor Darul Ta'zim
- 2022–2023: Atlas
- 2024: York United
- 2024–2025: Querétaro
- 2025–2026: Wuhan Three Towns
- 2026–: Pachuca

Benjamín Mora Mendívil (born 25 June 1979) is a Mexican professional football manager who is the head coach of Liga MX club Pachuca.

== Early life ==
Mora described his early life as "nomadic" as he lived in several cities and moved about 20 times. His father, Benjamín Mora Mercado, was a businessman and wrestling promoter. His mother, María Antonieta Mendívil, was a national volleyball player in the 1970s.

In 2005, he was a contestant on Big Brother México in its third season.

== Managerial career ==
Mora started his coaching career in 2011 with Tijuana Reserves in the Mexican lower divisions, before becoming manager of Atlético Chiapas in 2014. Between 2012 and 2015, he also served as an assistant coach at various Mexican clubs, including Querétaro, Atlante and Tapachula.

In December 2015, Mora was appointed manager of JDT II, the reserve team of Johor Darul Ta'zim (JDT), for the 2016 season. In January 2017, Mora took the vacant manager position of the main JDT team after Mario Gómez left the club. With JDT, he won the Malaysian Super League title in 2021.

In April 2022, JDT, managed by Mora, became the first Malaysian team to reach the round of 16 of the AFC Champions League after defeating Ulsan Hyundai 2–1 at the Sultan Ibrahim Stadium. He resigned as manager on 27 July 2022 for personal reasons.

On 6 October 2022, Mora returned to Mexico and became the manager of Liga MX side Atlas, replacing Diego Cocca. On 30 October 2023, Mora was dismissed from his position following a series of poor results.

On 4 June 2024, Mora was appointed as head coach for York United of the Canadian Premier League. He helped the club reach a club record in points that season and was nominated for the league's Coach of the Year award, but departed the club by mutual consent at the end of the season.

In December 2024, he was named as manager of Querétaro in Liga MX. He was relieved of his duties on 14 November 2025.

On January 2, 2026, Mora was appointed as the manager of Wuhan Three Towns, team that plays in the Chinese Super League. This marked his return to Asian football three years after leaving JDT. On May 8, 2026, he was dismissed from his position following a series of poor results that led the team to relegation positions, in addition to differences between the project proposed by Mora and the objectives of the Wuhan board.

One month after leaving Wuhan, on June 10, 2026, he was announced as the new coach of Pachuca of Liga MX.

== Managerial statistics ==
As of 21 November 2026

Managerial record by team and tenure
Team	Nat.	From	To	Record					Ref.
Team	Nat.	From	To	G	W	D	L	Win %	Ref.
Johor Darul Ta'zim II	(Malaysia)	1 December 2015	18 January 2017	29	14	8	7	48.28	
Johor Darul Ta'zim	(Malaysia)	19 January 2017	19 June 2017	27	17	5	5	62.96	
Johor Darul Ta'zim II	(Malaysia)	20 June 2017	9 August 2018	30	15	9	6	50.00	
Johor Darul Ta'zim	(Malaysia)	21 October 2020	27 July 2022	63	47	9	7	74.60	
Atlas	(Mexico)	6 October 2022	30 October 2023	41	13	15	13	31.71	
York United	(Canada)	2 June 2024	11 November 2024	22	9	6	7	40.91	
Queretaro	(Mexico)	7 December 2024	14 November 2025	34	11	4	19	32.35	
Wuhan Three Towns	(China)	2 January 2026	8 May 2026	10	2	2	6	20.00	
Pachuca	(Mexico)	10 June 2026	Present	20	8	4	8	40.00	
Career Total				276	136	62	78	49.28	

== Honours ==
=== Manager ===
Johor Darul Ta'zim

- Malaysia Super League: 2021
- Malaysia Charity Shield: 2021, 2022

Individual

- Canadian Premier League Manager of the Month: July 2024
