= Renan Garcia =

Brazilian footballer

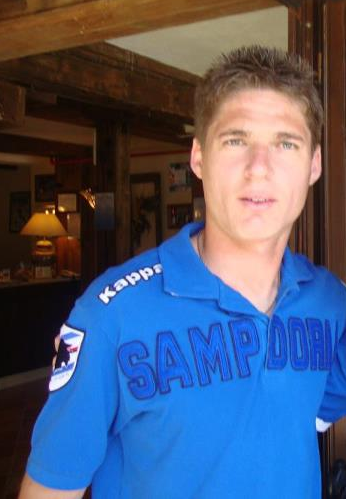

Personal information
- Full name: Renan Fernandes Garcia
- Date of birth: June 19, 1986 (age 40)
- Place of birth: Batatais, Brazil
- Height: 1.86 m (6 ft 1 in)
- Position: Midfielder

Youth career
- 2003–2004: Batatais

Senior career*
| Years | Team | Apps | (Gls) |
| 2005–2009 | Atlético Mineiro | 32 | (0) |
| 2006 | → Santa Cruz (loan) | 11 | (2) |
| 2008–2009 | → Celta Vigo (loan) | 17 | (2) |
| 2009 | → Sport Recife (loan) | 2 | (0) |
| 2009 | → Fortaleza (loan) | 2 | (0) |
| 2009–2011 | Vitória Guimarães | 5 | (0) |
| 2010–2011 | → Beira-Mar (loan) | 30 | (3) |
| 2011–2012 | CFR Cluj | 18 | (3) |
| 2012 | → Sampdoria (loan) | 18 | (0) |
| 2012–2014 | Sampdoria | 23 | (2) |
| 2014–2015 | Al Nasr | 25 | (0) |
| 2015–2016 | Emirates Club | 23 | (2) |
| 2019 | Batatais | 2 | (0) |
| 2021 | Comercial | 1 | (0) |
| 2023–2024 | Vancouver FC | 41 | (1) |
- * Club domestic league appearances and goals as of 19 October 2024

Renan Fernandes Garcia (born June 19, 1986 in Batatais) is a Brazilian footballer.

== Career ==
=== Sampdoria ===
On 30 January 2012, Renan signed for Sampdoria for €3.2 million. Previously, the Genovese club paid CFR Cluj €1 million for the player's loan. On 1 December 2013, he scored his first goal against F.C. Internazionale Milano.

== Honours ==
Atlético Mineiro

- Campeonato Brasileiro Série B: 2006
- Campeonato Mineiro: 2007

CFR Cluj

- Liga I: 2011–12

Al Nasr

- UAE President's Cup: 2014–15
- UAE League Cup: 2014–15
