= Thomas Vincensini =

French footballer (born 1993)

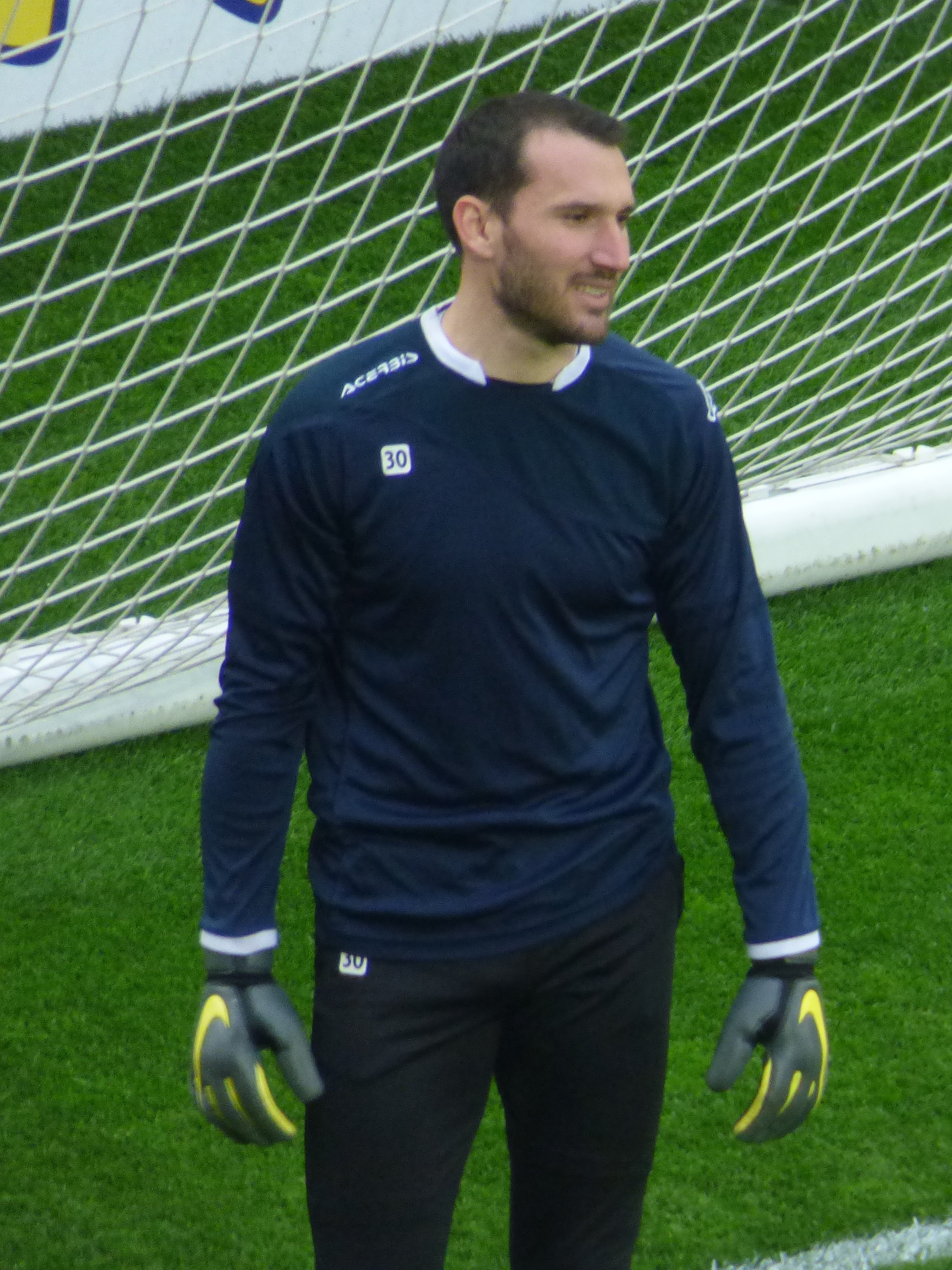
- Vincensini in 2019

Personal information
- Date of birth: 12 September 1993 (age 33)
- Place of birth: Bastia, Corsica, France
- Height: 1.80 m (5 ft 11 in)
- Position: Goalkeeper

Youth career
- Bastia

Senior career*
Years	Team	Apps	(Gls)
2010–2017	Bastia	6	(0)
2012–2017	→ Bastia B	62	(0)
2017–2018	Bastia-Borgo	8	(0)
2018–2019	Valenciennes	0	(0)
2019–2021	Lens	1	(0)
2019–2021	→ Lens II	2	(0)
2020–2021	→ Bastia (loan)	33	(0)
2021–2022	Bastia	19	(0)
2022–2023	Virton	24	(0)
2024	York United FC	28	(0)
Total		183	(0)

International career
2016	Corsica	1	(0)
- * Club domestic league appearances and goals

Thomas Vincensini (born 12 September 1993) is a French professional footballer who plays as a goalkeeper.

== Early life ==
Vincensini joined the youth sector of Bastia at age six.

== Club career ==
Vincensini began his senior career with Bastia. He made his senior debut for the club in a Ligue 2 match in May 2012 against Istres. He signed his first professional contract in 2013. After the side won promotion in 2013 to the top tier, he continued to serve as the backup keeper and made his Ligue 1 debut in 2015 as a substitute in a 1-1 draw against FC Lorient. He made his first Ligue 1 start the next year, keeping a clean sheet against Stade Reims. After the 2016-2017 season, Bastia was administratively relegated to the fifth tier Championnat National 3 and the club lost its professional status, resulting in his contract being automatically terminated. He then went on trial with Stade Brestois.

He played with Bastia-Borgo during the 2017-18 season.

In June 2018, he signed with Ligue 2 side Valenciennes.

In June 2019, he signed with Ligue 2 club Lens.

In June 2020, he was loaned to his former club Bastia, now in the third tier Championnat National. In June 2021, he joined Bastia on a permanent contract, who were now in Ligue 2. On 12 July 2022, Vincensini's contract with Bastia was terminated by mutual consent.

In July 2022, he moved to Virton in Belgium. He began the season as the starting keeper. He also spent some time serving as team captain. After a poor match in March 2023 against Deinze, he was dropped from the matchday squad for the following match, attributed to his poor reaction upon the backup keeper being named the starter. He departed the club at the end of the season.

In February 2024, he signed with Canadian Premier League club York United FC. He was twice named the league's Goalkeeper of the Month in June and August 2024. At the end of the 2024 season, he was nominated for the league's Goalkeeper of the Year award.

== International career ==
He played with the non-affiliated Corsica football team, representing the Corsica region of France, in a friendly against Spanish regional team Basque Country on 27 May 2016. He was later selected to the squad for the 2018 Tournoi des 4.
