= 2026 Vancouver FC season =

Canadian soccer club's season of play

Vancouver FC
2026 season
- President: Rob Friend
- Head coach: Martin Nash
- Stadium: Willoughby Stadium
- Canadian Premier League: 5th
- CPL playoffs: Did not qualify
- Canadian Championship: Quarter-finals
- CONCACAF Champions Cup: Round one
- Top goalscorer: League: Mohamed Amissi; Terran Campbell (7 each); All: Mohamed Amissi; Terran Campbell (7 each)

The 2026 Vancouver FC season was the fourth season in the history of Vancouver FC. In addition to the Canadian Premier League, the club also competed in the Canadian Championship and, for the first time, the CONCACAF Champions Cup.

After taking over as interim head coach during the 2025 season, Martin Nash was confirmed as permanent head coach, on January 14, 2026.

== Squad ==
As of August 26, 2026

No.	Player	Nationality	Position(s)	Date of birth (age)	Previous club	Notes
Goalkeepers
1	Callum Irving	(Canada)	GK	March 16, 1993 (age 33)	(Canada) Pacific FC	
33	Henrik Regitnig	(Canada)	GK	June 20, 1997 (age 29)	(Germany) VfB Hallbergmoos	
35	Matheus de Souza	(Canada)	GK	January 10, 2005 (age 21)	(Canada) UFV Cascades	U21, U-S
Defenders
2	Paris Gee	(Canada)	LB / RB	July 5, 1994 (age 32)	(Canada) York United	
3	Morey Doner	(Canada)	RB	March 25, 1994 (age 32)	(United States) Oakland Roots	
4	Isak Ssewankambo	(Sweden)	CB / DM	February 27, 1996 (age 30)	(Sweden) IF Brommapojkarna	INT
5	Matteo Campagna	(Canada)	CB / DM	June 27, 2004 (age 22)	(Canada) Vancouver Whitecaps FC	
23	Kian Proctor	(Canada)	FB	August 24, 2005 (age 21)	(Canada) TSS Rovers	U21
28	Nicolas Nadeau	(Canada)	CB / DM		(Canada) UBC Thunderbirds	U21, U-S
30	Tom Field	(Republic of Ireland)	LB / CB	March 14, 1997 (age 29)	(Canada) Cavalry FC	
Midfielders
6	Damiano Pecile	(Canada)	DM	April 11, 2002 (age 24)	(Portugal) Covilhã	
7	Thierno Bah	(Canada)	RW / RB	July 30, 2004 (age 22)	(Canada) Whitecaps FC 2	
8	Luis Toomey	(New Zealand)	AM	July 1, 2001 (age 25)	(New Zealand) Auckland FC	INT
15	Abdoulaye Ouattara	(France)	DM / CM	January 8, 2001 (age 25)	(United Arab Emirates) Elite Falcons FC	INT
16	Ben Lee	(Canada)	CM	August 5, 2006 (age 20)	(Republic of Ireland) Treaty United	U21
17	Emrick Fotsing	(Canada)	CM	September 27, 2007 (age 19)	(Canada) CF Montréal Academy	U21, EYT, Loan
18	Thomas Powell	(Canada)	AM	May 11, 2001 (age 25)	(Canada) Unity FC	
20	Nicolás Mezquida	(Uruguay)	AM / RW	January 21, 1992 (age 34)	(Uruguay) Rampla Juniors	
21	Marcello Polisi	(Canada)	CM / DM	January 24, 1997 (age 29)	(United States) Detroit City FC	
26	Carson Rassak	(Canada)	CM	October 20, 2008 (age 18)	(Canada) Whitecaps FC 2	U21, EYT
Forwards
9	Lys Mousset	(France)	ST	February 8, 1996 (age 30)	(Republic of Ireland) Bohemians	INT
10	Mohamed Amissi	(Burundi)	CF	August 3, 2000 (age 26)	(Egypt) Modern Sport	INT
11	Aboubacar Traore	(Ivory Coast)	CF	April 4, 2003 (age 23)	(United States) FAU Owls	INT
14	Terran Campbell	(Canada)	ST / LW	October 10, 1998 (age 28)	(Canada) Forge FC	
19	Marsel Bibishkov	(Canada)	CF	April 11, 2007 (age 19)	(Bulgaria) Septemvri Sofia	U21
24	Henri Godbout	(United States)	FW	April 27, 2005 (age 21)	(Canada) UBC Thunderbirds	U21, U-S
	Vitor Lucas	(Brazil)	CF	April 5, 2006 (age 20)	(Brazil) Bragantino U20	INT
Out on loan
16	Michel Cavalcante (at Palmeiras)	(Brazil)	DM	May 23, 2006 (age 20)	(Brazil) Fortaleza U20	INT

== Transfers ==
=== In ===
No.	Pos.	Player	From club	Fee/notes	Date	Source
	DF	(Canada) Morey Doner	(United States) Oakland Roots	Free	January 6, 2026	
	MF	(Canada) Marcello Polisi	(United States) Detroit City FC	Free	January 6, 2026	
	MF	(New Zealand) Luis Toomey	Free Agent	Free	January 6, 2026	
	DF	(Republic of Ireland) Tom Field	(Canada) Cavalry FC	Free	January 12, 2026	
	FW	(Burundi) Mohamed Amissi	(Egypt) Modern Sport	Free	January 12, 2026	
	FW	(United States) Henri Godbout	(Canada) UBC Thunderbirds	U-Sports contract	January 20, 2026	
	GK	(Canada) Matheus de Souza	(Canada) UFV Cascades	Selected 5th in the 2026 CPL–U Sports Draft, U Sports contract	January 29, 2026	
	DF	(Canada) Kian Proctor	(Canada) TSS Rovers	Free	January 29, 2026	
	MF	(Canada) Damiano Pecile	(Portugal) Covilhã	Free	February 2, 2026	
	DF	(Canada) Nicolas Nadeau	(Canada) UBC Thunderbirds	U-Sports contract	February 3, 2026	
	DF	(Sweden) Isak Ssewankambo	(Sweden) IF Brommapojkarna	Free	March 6, 2026	
	FW	(Canada) Marsel Bibishkov	(Bulgaria) Septemvri Sofia	Free	March 12, 2026	
	FW	(France) Lys Mousset	(Republic of Ireland) Bohemians	Free	March 23, 2026	
	FW	(Brazil) Vitor Lucas	(Brazil) Bragantino U20	Free	March 27, 2026	
	GK	(Canada) Henrik Regitnig	(Germany) VfB Hallbergmoos	Free	April 2, 2026	
	FW	(Ivory Coast) Aboubacar Traore	(United States) FAU Owls	Free	April 10, 2026	
	MF	(Canada) Ben Lee	(Republic of Ireland) Treaty United	Free	August 5, 2026	
	MF	(Canada) Carson Rassak	(Canada) Whitecaps FC 2	Free	September 21, 2026	

==== Loans in ====
No.	Pos.	Player	From club	Fee/notes	Date	Source
17	MF	(Canada) Emrick Fotsing	(Canada) Vancouver Whitecaps	Loaned from September 2026 until end of season	August 26, 2026	

==== Draft picks ====
Vancouver FC selected the following players in the 2026 CPL–U Sports Draft. Draft picks are not automatically signed to the team roster. Only those who are signed to a contract will be listed as transfers in.

Round	Selection	Pos.	Player	Nationality	University
1	3	DF	Joseph Green	Canada	Mount Royal
1	5 (Note: Inter Toronto FC's first round pick (5th overall) went to Vancouver FC as a result of a trade on January 13, 2025 in exchange for Gabriel Bitar.)	GK	Matheus De Souza	Canada	Fraser Valley
2	10	DF	Nicolas Nadeau	Canada	UBC

=== Out ===
No.	Pos.	Player	To club	Fee/notes	Date	Source
4	DF	(Uganda) Allan Enyou	(Spain) Leganés B	Loan ended	November 9, 2025	
15	DF	(United States) Aidan O'Connor	(United States) New York Red Bulls II	Loan ended	November 9, 2025	
25	DF	(Senegal) Pathé Ndiaye	(Spain) Leganés B	Loan ended	November 9, 2025	
9	FW	(Canada) Hugo Mbongue	(Canada) Toronto FC	Loan ended	November 9, 2025	
11	FW	(New Zealand) Jay Herdman	(Canada) Cavalry FC	Loan ended	November 9, 2025	
31	GK	(Canada) Jakob Frank		Contract expired	December 31, 2025	
	MF	(Canada) Zach Verhoven		Contract expired	December 31, 2025	
3	DF	(Canada) Kunle Dada-Luke		Option declined	December 31, 2025	
10	MF	(Brazil) Juan Batista		Option declined	December 31, 2025	
19	FW	(Mexico) José Navarro		Option declined	December 31, 2025	
13	DF	(Canada) David Norman Jr.	Retired		February 23, 2026	
6	MF	(Peru) Vasco Fry		Contract terminated by mutual consent	March 6, 2026	
29	FW	(Canada) Kevin Podgorni		Contract terminated by mutual consent	April 2, 2026	
41	GK	(Colombia) Felipe Jaramillo		Contract terminated by mutual consent	June 1, 2026	
12	DF	(Canada) Tyler Crawford	(Vietnam) Thep Xanh Nam Dinh	Undisclosed fee & sell-on clause	July 23, 2026	
17	MF	(Canada) Emrick Fotsing	(Canada) Vancouver Whitecaps	Undisclosed fee & future considerations	August 26, 2026	

==== Loans out ====
No.	Pos.	Player	To club	Fee/notes	Date	Source
16	MF	(Brazil) Michel Cavalcante	(Brazil) Palmeiras	Loaned until January 26, 2027; undisclosed fee & permanent transfer option	February 10, 2026	

== Competitions ==
=== Overview ===
Competition	Starting round	Final position	Record							
Competition	Starting round	Final position	Pld	W	D	L	GF	GA	GD	Win %
Canadian Premier League	Matchday 1	Fifth Place	28	10	7	11	39	37	+2	35.71
Canadian Championship	First round	Quarter Finals	3	1	0	2	4	4	+0	33.33
CONCACAF Champions Cup	First round	First Round	2	0	0	2	0	8	−8	0.00
Total			33	11	7	15	43	49	−6	33.33

Last updated: October 25, 2026
Source: Competitions

=== Canadian Premier League ===
==== Results by match ====
Match	1	2	3	4	5	6	7	8	9	10	11	12	13	14	15	16	17	18	19	20	21	22	23	24	25	26	27	28
Result	L	L	L	D	W	L	D	L	W	W	L	W	W	W	W	W	D	L	L	L	W	L	D	D	D	D	W	L
Position	7	7	8	8	6	7	7	7	7	6	6	4	4	4	3	3	3	4	4	4	4	4	4	4	4	4	4	5

Updated to match(es) played on October 25, 2026. Source: #Matches
W = Win; D = Draw; L = Loss

==== Regular season ====
4 April 2026 Match Week 1	Vancouver FC	0–1	HFX Wanderers	Langley, British Columbia
	Polisi (yellow card) 4'; Gee (yellow card) 90+2'; Field (yellow card) 90+5'	Report	Callegari (yellow card) 22', (goal) 69'; Olguin (yellow card) 39'; Akinwale (yellow card) 90+3'	Stadium: Willoughby Stadium; Attendance: 3,528; Referee: Roberto D'Alesio

12 April 2026 Match Week 2	Vancouver FC	0–1	Forge FC	Langley, British Columbia
	Pecile (yellow card) 78'; Campagna (yellow card) 81'	Report	Oketokoun (yellow card) 59'; Aromatario (yellow card) 74'; Filion 90'	Stadium: Willoughby Stadium; Attendance: 1,908; Referee: Renzo Villanueva

19 April 2026 Match Week 3	Inter Toronto	1–0	Vancouver FC	Toronto, Ontario
	Jimoh (yellow card) 5'; Bitar 6'; Ferrari (yellow card) 45+4'; Skublak (yellow card) 55'; Altobelli (yellow card) 75'; Yeates (yellow card) 88'	Report		Stadium: York Lions Stadium; Referee: Mathieu Souaré

26 April 2026 Match Week 4	Atlético Ottawa	1–1	Vancouver FC	Ottawa, Ontario
	Tabla (yellow card) 57'; García 90+7'	Report	Polisi (yellow card) 21'; Toomey (yellow card) 45+4'; Amissi 61', (yellow card) 72'	Stadium: TD Place Stadium; Referee: Renzo Villanueva

3 May 2026 Match Week 5	Pacific FC	1–3	Vancouver FC	Victoria, British Columbia
	Juhmi (yellow card) 65'; Bustos (yellow card) 71'; Toualy 78'	Report	Amissi 37'; Campbell 60', 82'; Polisi (yellow card) 68'	Stadium: Royal Athletic Park; Referee: Yusri Rudolf

17 May 2026 Match Week 6	Vancouver FC	0–2	Cavalry FC	Langley, British Columbia
	Amissi (yellow card) 11'; Traore (yellow card) 23'; Campbell (yellow card) 54'; Mousset (yellow card) 88'	Report	Ingham (yellow card) 66'; Warschewski (yellow card) 66', (goal) 70'; Laing 90+7'	Stadium: Willoughby Stadium; Referee: Mario Alayass

23 May 2026 Match Week 7	Vancouver FC	1–1	FC Supra	Langley, British Columbia
	Polisi (yellow card) 16'; Field (yellow card) 78'; Amissi 87'	Report	Boughanmi (yellow card) 34'; Kaboré (yellow card) 41'; Chrétien 90+5'	Stadium: Willoughby Stadium; Referee: Roberto D'Alesio

30 May 2026 Match Week 8	HFX Wanderers	1–0	Vancouver FC	Halifax, Nova Scotia
	Callegari (yellow card) 29'; Johnston (yellow card) 76'; Ciccarelli (yellow card) 90+2' (yellow-red card) 90+5', (goal) 90+3'	Report	Bah (yellow card) 87'	Stadium: Wanderers Grounds; Referee: Michael Venne
Note: HFX Wanderers coach Vanni Sartini received a yellow card in the 82' minute.

5 June 2026 Match Week 9	Vancouver FC	2–1	Atlético Ottawa	Langley, British Columbia
	Campbell 14'; Mousset 35'; Field (yellow card) 86'		Timoteo (yellow card) 31'; Tabla 73'; Aparicio (yellow card) 83'; Aguilar (yellow card) 87'	Stadium: Willoughby Stadium; Referee: Mathieu Souaré
Note: Atlético Ottawa player Gabriel Antinoro received a red card in the 90+7' minute from the bench.

14 June 2026 Match Week 10	Vancouver FC	2–1	Pacific FC	Langley, British Columbia
	Proctor 60'; Toomey 77'		Bustos 34'; Schiavoni (yellow card) 84'; Lajeunesse (yellow card) 89'	Stadium: Willoughby Stadium; Referee: Roberto D'Alesio

1 July 2026 Match Week 11	Forge FC	3–2	Vancouver FC	Hamilton, Ontario
	Borges 61'; Krutzen 64'; Batisse 75'; Rama (yellow card) 90+7'	Report	Campbell 7'; Bah 45+2'; Mousset (yellow card) 90'	Stadium: Hamilton Stadium; Referee: Fabrizio Stasolla
Note: Forge FC manager Bobby Smyrniotis received a yellow card in the 45+7' minute from the bench.

4 July 2026 Match Week 12	Vancouver FC	4–0	Inter Toronto	Langley, British Columbia
	Mezquida 1'; Amissi 6', 38', 43'	Report	León (yellow card) 53'; Jimoh (yellow card) 64'; Almagro (yellow card) 73'	Stadium: Willoughby Stadium; Referee: Renzo Villanueva

17 July 2026 Match Week 13	FC Supra	1–5	Vancouver FC	Laval, Quebec
	Biello (yellow card) 12'; Bayiha 46'; Bey (red card) 90'	Report	Pecile (yellow card) 11', (goal) 21'; Campagna 32'; Mousset 53' (pen.); Campbell 82'; Traore 86'	Stadium: Stade Boréale; Referee: Michael Venne

24 July 2026 Match Week 14	Vancouver FC	1–0	Cavalry FC	Langley, British Columbia
	Polisi (yellow card) 25'; Traore (yellow card) 37'; Mousset 59'; Bah (yellow card) 70'	Report	Kobza (yellow card) 23' (yellow-red card) 42'; Paton (yellow card) 90+5'	Stadium: Willoughby Stadium; Referee: Mathieu Souaré
Note: Vancouver FC manager Martin Nash received a yellow card in the 39' minute from the bench.

1 Aug. 2026 Match Week 15	Vancouver FC	3–1	Atlético Ottawa	Langley, British Columbia
	Amissi 7'; Mousset 14' (pen.); Pecile 45+2'; Ouattara (yellow card) 58'; Field (yellow card) 90+3'	Report	Arnaud 50'; Tabla (yellow card) 78'; Aguilar (yellow card) 84'; Habibullah (yellow card) 85'	Stadium: Willoughby Stadium; Referee: Roberto D'Alesio

7 Aug. 2026 Match Week 16	Forge FC	0–1	Vancouver FC	Hamilton, Ontario
	Ampomah (yellow card) 39'; Paton (yellow card) 48'; Rama (yellow card) 68'; Bourgeois (yellow card) 87'; Batisse (yellow card) 90+6'	Report	Pecile 44'; Mezquida (yellow card) 86'	Stadium: Hamilton Stadium; Referee: Renzo Villanueva
Note: Forge FC manager Bobby Smyrniotis received a yellow card in the 68' minute from the bench.

14 Aug. 2026 Match Week 17	Vancouver FC	1–1	Pacific FC	Langley, British Columbia
	Campagna (yellow card) 40'; Bah (yellow card) 84'; Campbell 87'	Report	Kratt 36'; Juhmi (yellow card) 61'	Stadium: Willoughby Stadium; Referee: Michael Venne

19 Aug. 2026 Match Week 18	Atlético Ottawa	4–0	Vancouver FC	Ottawa, Ontario
	Assi 13', 59'; García (yellow card) 51', (goal) 73'; Fleuriau Chateau 63'	Report	Mezquida (yellow card) 39'; Ouattara (yellow card) 90+3'	Stadium: TD Place Stadium; Referee: Myriam Marcotte

22 Aug. 2026 Match Week 19	HFX Wanderers	1–0	Vancouver FC	Halifax, Nova Scotia
	Bahamboula 18'; Callegari (yellow card) 78'; Olguin (yellow card) 83'	Report	Bah (yellow card) 45+3'; Gee (yellow card) 57'; Polisi (yellow card) 72'	Stadium: Wanderers Grounds; Referee: Roberto D'Alesio

29 Aug. 2026 Match Week 20	Cavalry FC	1–0	Vancouver FC	Foothills County, Alberta
	Kamdem (yellow card) 31', (goal) 58'	Report	Campagna (yellow card) 42'; Proctor (yellow card) 57'	Stadium: ATCO Field; Referee: Michael Venne

6 Sept. 2026 Match Week 21	Vancouver FC	3–2	FC Supra	Langley, British Columbia
	Ferdinand 35' (o.g.); Mousset 43'; Bah 72'	Report	Chrétien 10', (yellow card) 45+3'; Condé 14'; Abzi (yellow card) 45+1'; Lebeuf (yellow card) 87'	Stadium: Willoughby Stadium; Referee: Carly Shaw-MacLaren

13 Sept. 2026 Match Week 22	Inter Toronto	3–1	Vancouver FC	Toronto, Ontario
	Skublak (yellow card) 27', (goal) 50'; Accettola 39'; Irving 56' (o.g.); Clarke (yellow card) 78'	Report	Bah (yellow card) 58', (goal) 72'	Stadium: York Lions Stadium; Referee: Iwan-Nikita Jecanski

19 Sept. 2026 Match Week 23	Pacific FC	1–1	Vancouver FC	Langford, British Columbia
	Toualy 45+3'; Hundal (yellow card) 90+1'	Report	Toomey 10', (yellow card) 50'; Lee (yellow card) 90+3'	Stadium: Starlight Stadium; Referee: Mathieu Souaré

23 Sept. 2026 Match Week 24	Vancouver FC	3–3	Inter Toronto	Langley, British Columbia
	Doner 8'; Proctor 71'; Toomey 90+2'; Mezquida (yellow card) 90+6'	Report	Almagro 24'; Yeates 44'; Badibanga (yellow card) 90+6'; Skublak 90+7'	Stadium: Willoughby Stadium; Referee: Yusri Rudolf

26 Sept. 2026 Match Week 25	Vancouver FC	1–1	Forge FC	Langley, British Columbia
	Doner 64'; Toomey (yellow card) 68'; Mezquida (yellow card) 86'; Polisi (yellow card) 90+8'	Report	James 16'	Stadium: Willoughby Stadium; Referee: Iwan-Nikita Jecanski

10 Oct. 2026 Match Week 26	FC Supra	2–2	Vancouver FC	Laval, Quebec
	Kwemi 7'; Mlah 88', (yellow card) 90+5'; Brault-Guillard (yellow card) 90+5'	Report	Campagna (yellow card) 25', (goal) 90+6'; Toomey (yellow card) 47'; Campbell 59'; Lee (yellow card) 90+4'	Stadium: Stade Boréale; Referee: Renzo Villanueva

16 Oct. 2026 Match Week 27	Vancouver FC	2–1	HFX Wanderers	Langley, British Columbia
	Bah 24'; Ssewankambo (yellow card) 53'; Campagna 76'	Report	Olguin 44'; Reid (yellow card) 69'	Stadium: Willoughby Stadium; Referee: Alain Ruch

25 Oct. 2026 Match Week 28	Cavalry FC	1–0	Vancouver FC	Foothills County, Alberta
	Musse 29'	Report	Polisi (red card) 90+8'	Stadium: ATCO Field; Referee: Mario Alayass

=== Canadian Championship ===
Vancouver FC, runners up in the 2025 Canadian Championship open their campaign in the preliminary round against British Colombia Premier League team, Langley United.

10 May 2026 Preliminary round	Vancouver FC	2–0	Langley United	Langley, British Columbia
	Field 74', (yellow card) 90+4'; Mezquida 87'	Report	Papakyriakopoulos (yellow card) 26'; Green (yellow card) 35'; Jones (yellow card) 40'; Mejia (yellow card) 67'	Stadium: Willoughby Stadium; Referee: Iwan-Nikita Jecanski

8 July 2026 QF Leg 1	Vancouver FC	1–2	CF Montréal	Langley, British Columbia
	Mezquida 54'; Polisi (yellow card) 87'	Report	Campagna 63' (o.g.); Þórhallsson (yellow card) 68'; Owusu 90+2' (pen.); Amaya (yellow card) 90+4'	Stadium: Willoughby Stadium; Referee: Scott Bowman

12 July 2026 QF Leg 2	CF Montréal	2–1 (4–2 agg.)	Vancouver FC	Montreal, Quebec
	Morales (yellow card) 27' (yellow-red card) 43'; Craig 56'; Bugaj (yellow card) 62'; Loturi (yellow card) 65'; Ríos 68'	Report	Field (yellow card) 55'; Doner 79'; Ssewankambo (yellow card) 84'	Stadium: Saputo Stadium; Referee: Robert D'Alesio
Note: CF Montréal wins 4-2 on aggregate

=== Round one ===
February 4 First leg	Vancouver FC (Canada)	0–3	Cruz Azul	Langley, British Columbia
7:00 PM	Pecile (yellow card) 2'; Mezquida (yellow card) 90+1'		Paradela 22', (yellow card) 82'; Piovi (yellow card) 30'; Morales 44'; Palavecino 65'; Ditta (yellow card) 90+5'	Stadium: Willoughby Stadium; Referee: José Torres

February 12 Second leg	Cruz Azul	5–0 (8–0 agg.)	(Canada) Vancouver FC	Puebla, Mexico
7:00 PM	Ditta (yellow card) 15'; Romero 37', 45+1', 62'; Rodarte 68'; Ibáñez 74'		Norman Jr. (yellow card) 82'	Stadium: Estadio Cuauhtémoc
Note: Cruz Azul wins 8-0 on aggregate

== Statistics ==
=== Appearances and goals ===
As of October 25, 2026

No.	Pos	Nat	Player	Total		CPL		Canadian Championship		Champions Cup	
No.	Pos	Nat	Player	Apps	Goals	Apps	Goals	Apps	Goals	Apps	Goals
Goalkeepers
1	GK	(Canada) CAN	Callum Irving	29	0	24	0	3	0	2	0
33	GK	(Canada) CAN	Henrik Regitnig	3	0	3	0	0	0	0	0
35	GK	(Canada) CAN	Matheus de Souza	1	0	1	0	0	0	0	0
Defenders
2	DF	(Canada) CAN	Paris Gee	21	0	10+7	0	1+1	0	2	0
3	DF	(Canada) CAN	Morey Doner	33	3	28	2	3	1	2	0
4	DF	(Sweden) SWE	Isak Ssewankambo	13	0	8+2	0	0+3	0	0	0
5	DF	(Canada) CAN	Matteo Campagna	33	3	28	3	3	0	2	0
23	DF	(Canada) CAN	Kian Proctor	31	2	21+5	2	2+1	0	1+1	0
30	DF	(Republic of Ireland) IRL	Tom Field	32	1	27	0	3	1	2	0
Midfielders
6	MF	(Canada) CAN	Damiano Pecile	30	3	20+5	3	2+1	0	2	0
7	MF	(Canada) CAN	Thierno Bah	32	4	24+3	4	3	0	2	0
8	MF	(New Zealand) NZL	Luis Toomey	25	3	6+15	3	0+2	0	2	0
15	MF	(France) FRA	Abdoulaye Ouattara	14	0	3+9	0	0	0	0+2	0
16	MF	(Canada) CAN	Ben Lee	10	0	2+8	0	0	0	0	0
17	MF	(Canada) CAN	Emrick Fotsing	17	0	9+5	0	3	0	0	0
18	MF	(Canada) CAN	Thomas Powell	5	0	0+4	0	0	0	0+1	0
20	MF	(Uruguay) URU	Nicolás Mezquida	31	3	13+13	1	3	2	0+2	0
21	MF	(Canada) CAN	Marcello Polisi	29	0	22+2	0	1+2	0	2	0
26	MF	(Canada) CAN	Carson Rassak	2	0	0+2	0	0	0	0	0
Forwards
9	FW	(France) FRA	Lys Mousset	22	5	12+8	5	0+2	0	0	0
10	FW	(Burundi) BDI	Mohamed Amissi	28	7	21+2	7	3	0	2	0
11	FW	(Ivory Coast) CIV	Aboubacar Traore	23	1	9+12	1	0+2	0	0	0
14	FW	(Canada) CAN	Terran Campbell	31	7	16+11	7	3	0	0+1	0
19	FW	(Canada) CAN	Marsel Bibishkov	1	0	0+1	0	0	0	0	0
24	FW	(United States) USA	Henri Godbout	6	0	0+6	0	0	0	0	0
29	FW	(Brazil) BRA	Vitor Lucas	1	0	0+1	0	0	0	0	0
Players transferred out during the season
12	DF	(Canada) CAN	Tyler Crawford	4	0	1+1	0	0	0	1+1	0
13	DF	(Canada) CAN	David Norman Jr.	2	0	0	0	0	0	0+2	0

Source: Competitions

=== Goalscorers ===
As of October 25, 2026

Rank	No.	Pos	Nat	Name	CPL	Canadian Championship	Champions Cup	Total
1	10	FW	(Burundi)	Mohamed Amissi	7	0	0	7
1	14	FW	(Canada)	Terran Campbell	7	0	0	7
3	9	FW	(France)	Lys Mousset	5	0	0	5
4	7	MF	(Canada)	Thierno Bah	4	0	0	4
5	3	DF	(Canada)	Morey Doner	2	1	0	3
5	5	DF	(Canada)	Matteo Campagna	3	0	0	3
5	6	MF	(Canada)	Damiano Pecile	3	0	0	3
5	8	MF	(New Zealand)	Luis Toomey	3	0	0	3
5	20	MF	(Uruguay)	Nicolás Mezquida	1	2	0	3
10	23	DF	(Canada)	Kian Proctor	2	0	0	2
11	11	FW	(Ivory Coast)	Aboubacar Traore	1	0	0	1
11	30	DF	(Republic of Ireland)	Tom Field	0	1	0	1
Own Goals					1	0	0	1
Totals					39	4	0	43

=== Clean sheets ===
As of October 25, 2026

Rank	No.	Pos	Nat	Name	CPL	Canadian Championship	Champions Cup	Total
1	1	GK	(Canada)	Callum Irving	2	1	0	3
2	33	GK	(Canada)	Henrik Regitnig	1	0	0	1
Totals					3	1	0	4

=== Disciplinary record ===
As of October 25, 2026

No.	Pos	Nat	Player	CPL			Canadian Championship			Champions Cup			Total		
No.	Pos	Nat	Player	Yellow card	(yellow card) (yellow-red card)	Red card	Yellow card	(yellow card) (yellow-red card)	Red card	Yellow card	(yellow card) (yellow-red card)	Red card	Yellow card	(yellow card) (yellow-red card)	Red card
2	DF	(Canada)	Paris Gee	2	0	0	0	0	0	0	0	0	2	0	0
4	DF	(Sweden)	Isak Ssewankambo	1	0	0	1	0	0	0	0	0	2	0	0
5	DF	(Canada)	Matteo Campagna	4	0	0	0	0	0	0	0	0	4	0	0
6	MF	(Canada)	Damiano Pecile	2	0	0	0	0	0	1	0	0	3	0	0
7	MF	(Canada)	Thierno Bah	5	0	0	0	0	0	0	0	0	5	0	0
8	MF	(New Zealand)	Luis Toomey	4	0	0	0	0	0	0	0	0	4	0	0
9	FW	(France)	Lys Mousset	2	0	0	0	0	0	0	0	0	2	0	0
10	FW	(Burundi)	Mohamed Amissi	2	0	0	0	0	0	0	0	0	2	0	0
11	FW	(Ivory Coast)	Aboubacar Traore	2	0	0	0	0	0	0	0	0	2	0	0
13	DF	(Canada)	David Norman Jr.	0	0	0	0	0	0	1	0	0	1	0	0
14	FW	(Canada)	Terran Campbell	1	0	0	0	0	0	0	0	0	1	0	0
15	MF	(France)	Abdoulaye Ouattara	2	0	0	0	0	0	0	0	0	2	0	0
16	MF	(Canada)	Ben Lee	2	0	0	0	0	0	0	0	0	2	0	0
20	MF	(Uruguay)	Nicolás Mezquida	4	0	0	0	0	0	1	0	0	5	0	0
21	MF	(Canada)	Marcello Polisi	7	0	1	1	0	0	0	0	0	8	0	1
23	DF	(Canada)	Kian Proctor	1	0	0	0	0	0	0	0	0	1	0	0
30	DF	(Republic of Ireland)	Tom Field	4	0	0	2	0	0	0	0	0	6	0	0
Totals				45	0	1	4	0	0	3	0	0	52	0	1
