= Pacific FC–Vancouver FC rivalry =

Soccer rivalry in Canada

Salish Sea Derby
- Other names: SixFive Derby
- Location: Coastal British Columbia
- Teams: Pacific FC; Vancouver FC
- First meeting: Pacific 1–0 Vancouver; CPL (April 15, 2023)
- Latest meeting: Pacific 1–1 Vancouver; CPL (September 19, 2026)
- Next meeting: TBD
- Stadiums: Starlight Stadium; Willoughby Community Park

Statistics
- Total meetings: 17
- Most wins: Vancouver (7)
- Top scorer: Alejandro Díaz; Aly Ndom (5 goals each)
- All-time series: Vancouver 7–6–4
- Largest victory: Vancouver 3–6 Pacific CPL (June 2, 2023); Pacific 3–0 Vancouver CPL (September 14, 2023)
- Current win streak: 0

The Salish Sea Derby, also known as the BC Derby and Pacific FC–Vancouver FC rivalry, is a British Columbian intra-provincial soccer rivalry between Pacific FC of Langford, and Vancouver FC of Langley Township. They regularly compete with each other in the Canadian Premier League. In addition to being geographic rivals, both clubs have the same owner – SixFive Sports and Entertainment.

== History ==
Pacific FC are an inaugural member of the Canadian Premier League, and played their first season in 2019. Despite having developed small and/or temporary rivalries with Cavalry FC and the Vancouver Whitecaps FC, the rivalries were considered secondary, as Cavalry would view their rivalries with FC Edmonton and Forge FC as being more important, while the Whitecaps played in a different league (MLS) completely. However, this would change following the foundation of Vancouver FC, a Canadian Premier League expansion team that started play in 2023.

The idea of a British Columbia derby or rivalry was quickly adopted by the league and supporters' groups of both clubs. In addition to their geographic proximity, the pair of clubs drew attention for sharing the same ownership group. The first player to sign with Vancouver FC was Callum Irving who had been the starting goalkeeper for Pacific for the past three seasons.

In an attempt to further instigate the rivalry, the league scheduled Pacific FC and Vancouver FC to play their first match of the regular season against each other. Since Vancouver FC was an expansion team in their inaugural season, this match was also their first ever match as a team, excluding preseason friendlies. Pacific FC would win the first match of the rivalry 1–0 in front of 4,825 spectators at Starlight Stadium. The winning goal was scored by Manny Aparicio in the eighty-first minute, which was quickly followed by a provocative celebration in front of the traveling supporters' section.

As the season progressed, Pacific FC would stay near the top of the table, while Vancouver quickly fell into last place, having won only one league match in their first seven games. Pacific FC triumphed again in their second league game against Vancouver with a 6–3 away win. Vancouver FC's first win against Pacific occurred in their third meeting of the regular season. Despite Pacific being up 2–1 late in the game, Gabriel Bitar scored two late goals for Vancouver in the last fourteen minutes, including an 87th minute winner to give Vancouver a 3–2 victory. A second win for Vancouver followed as they closed out their first season strongly, bringing the series to a tie with two wins apiece at the end of 2023.

Both teams started the 2024 season strongly, although the prolonged tussle for second place did not prevent Vancouver from notching up another two victories to take the lead in the series. As both teams faded in the latter half of the season, the fight became one to stay in playoffs contention, with Vancouver securing yet another narrow win at home to bring their series winning streak to five games, a run that was ended by a strong 3–0 Pacific victory at home in the last derby match of the season, a result that helped them pip Vancouver to the final playoffs spot.

== Statistics ==
=== Head-to-head record ===
As of September 19, 2026

	Matches	Wins		Draws	Goals	
	Matches	PAC	VFC	Draws	PAC	VFC
Canadian Premier League	16	4	7	5	28	28
Canadian Championship	1	0	0	1	1	1
Total matches	17	4	7	6	29	29

=== Honours ===
Pacific FC	Competition	Vancouver FC
1	CPL Championships	—
—	CPL Shield	—
—	Canadian Championship	—
1	Aggregate	0

== Results ==
Legend
Pacific FC win
Vancouver FC win
Tie

Season	Competition	Date	Home team	Result	Away team	Venue	Attendance	Series	Recap
2023	Canadian Premier League	April 15, 2023	Pacific	1–0	Vancouver	Starlight Stadium	4,825	PAC 1–0–0	
2023	Canadian Premier League	June 2, 2023	Vancouver	3–6	Pacific	Willoughby Community Park	3,438	PAC 2–0–0	
2023	Canadian Premier League	August 19, 2023	Vancouver	3–2	Pacific	Willoughby Community Park	2,363	PAC 2–0–1	
2023	Canadian Premier League	September 30, 2023	Pacific	1–2	Vancouver	Starlight Stadium	4,404	Tied 2–0–2	
2024	Canadian Premier League	May 25, 2024	Vancouver	2–1	Pacific	Willoughby Community Park	3,127	VFC 3–0–2	
2024	Canadian Premier League	June 27, 2024	Pacific	1–2	Vancouver	Starlight Stadium	3,255	VFC 4–0–2	
2024	Canadian Premier League	August 11, 2024	Vancouver	1–0	Pacific	Willoughby Community Park	3,258	VFC 5–0–2	
2024	Canadian Premier League	September 14, 2024	Pacific	3–0	Vancouver	Starlight Stadium	2,807	VFC 5–0–3	
2025	Canadian Premier League	April 26, 2025	Vancouver	1–1	Pacific	Willoughby Community Park	1,283	VFC 5–1–3	
2025	Canadian Championship	May 6, 2025	Pacific	1–1 (Note: Vancouver won 4–2 on penalties.)	Vancouver	Starlight Stadium	2,017	VFC 5–2–3	
2025	Canadian Premier League	June 27, 2025	Pacific	4–4	Vancouver	Starlight Stadium	2,821	VFC 5–3–3	
2025	Canadian Premier League	August 10, 2025	Vancouver	2–3	Pacific	Willoughby Community Park	1,408	VFC 5–3–4	
2025	Canadian Premier League	September 13, 2025	Pacific	1–1	Vancouver	Royal Athletic Park	4,300	VFC 5–4–4	
2026	Canadian Premier League	May 3, 2026	Pacific	1–3	Vancouver	Royal Athletic	3,507	VFC 6–4–4	
2026	Canadian Premier League	June 14, 2026	Vancouver	2–1	Pacific	Willoughby Community Park	1,820	VFC 7–4–4	
2026	Canadian Premier League	August 14, 2026	Vancouver	1–1	Pacific	Willoughby Community Park	2,218	VFC 7–5–4	
2026	Canadian Premier League	September 19, 2026	Pacific	1–1	Vancouver	Starlight Stadium	2,646	VFC 7–6–4	

== League ranking by season ==
P.	2023		2024		2025		2026	
P.	Season	Playoffs	Season	Playoffs	Season	Playoffs	Season	Playoffs
1								
2								
3		SF						
4	4							
5			5	PI			5	
6								
7	7		7		7			
8					8		8	

== Player statistics ==
=== Goalscorers ===
As of September 19, 2026

Rank	Pos	Nat	Player	Pacific	Vancouver	Total
1	FW	(Mexico)	Alejandro Díaz	2	3	5
1	MF	(France)	Aly Ndom	5		5
3	MF	(Lebanon)	Gabriel Bitar		3	3
3	FW	(Canada)	Terran Campbell		3	3
3	FW	(Ivory Coast)	Yann Toualy	3		3
6	MF	(Canada)	Manny Aparicio	2		2
6	MF	(Canada)	Thierno Bah		2	2
6	FW	(New Zealand)	Moses Dyer	1	1	2
6	MF	(Peru)	Vasco Fry		2	2
6	MF	(Wales)	Josh Heard	2		2
6	DF	(Canada)	Thomas Meilleur-Giguère	2		2
6	MF	(Uruguay)	Nicolás Mezquida		2	2
6	DF	(Senegal)	Ndiaye Pathé		2	2
6	FW	(Canada)	Easton Ongaro	2		2
6	FW	(Netherlands)	Ayman Sellouf	2		2
6	MF	(New Zealand)	Luis Toomey		2	2
6	FW	(Canada)	Dario Zanatta	2		2
18	FW	(Burkina Faso)	Mohamed Amissi		1	1
18	FW	(Canada)	Marco Bustos	1		1
18	FW	(Haiti)	Mikaël Cantave		1	1
18	FW	(Netherlands)	Djenairo Daniels	1		1
18	DF	(Canada)	Amer Didić	1		1
18	FW	(Canada)	Henri Godbout		1	1
18	FW	(Canada)	Shaan Hundal		1	1
18	GK	(Canada)	Callum Irving	1 (Note: Own goal)		1
18	FW	(Canada)	Ronan Kratt	1		1
18	MF	(Canada)	Min-jae Kwak		1	1
18	MF	(The Gambia)	Kekuta Manneh	1		1
18	FW	(Canada)	Hugo Mbongue		1	1
18	DF	(Canada)	David Norman Jr.		1	1
18	DF	(Canada)	Kian Proctor		1	1
18	MF	(Canada)	Taryck Tahid		1	1
Totals				29	29	58

== Players who played for both clubs ==
As of July 30, 2026

=== Multiple switches ===
- (Canada) Kadin Chung (Pacific: 2019–2021, Vancouver: 2023–2024, Pacific: 2025–present)
- (Mexico) Alejandro Díaz (Pacific: 2020–2022, Vancouver: 2023–2024 (loan), 2025, Pacific: 2025 (loan), 2026–present)

=== Pacific, then Vancouver ===
- (Canada) Callum Irving (Pacific: 2020–2022, Vancouver: 2023–present)
- (Canada) Ben Fisk (Pacific: 2019, Vancouver: 2024)
- (Canada) David Norman Jr. (Pacific: 2019 (loan), Vancouver: 2024–2025)
- (Canada) Zach Verhoven (Pacific: 2019–2020, Vancouver: 2024, 2025)
- (Netherlands) Ayman Sellouf (Pacific: 2023–2024, Vancouver: 2024 (loan))
- (Canada) Terran Campbell (Pacific: 2019–2021, Vancouver: 2025–present)
- (Canada) Kunle Dada-Luke (Pacific: 2021–2024, Vancouver: 2025)

=== Vancouver, then Pacific ===
- (New Zealand) Moses Dyer (Vancouver: 2024, Pacific: 2024 (loan))
- (Canada) Shaan Hundal (Vancouver: 2023, Pacific: 2026–present (loan))
