= BC Derby =

BC Derby may refer to:

- British Columbia Derby, an annual Thoroughbred horse race in Vancouver, British Columbia
- Pacific FC–Vancouver FC rivalry, a Canadian Premier League soccer rivalry

== See also ==
- Derby, British Columbia, a locality in the Lower Mainland of British Columbia
