= Vitor Lucas =

Brazilian footballer (born 2006)

Personal information
- Full name: Vitor Lucas de Araujo
- Date of birth: 5 April 2006 (age 20)
- Place of birth: Brazil
- Position: Forward

Team information
- Current team: Vancouver FC

Youth career
- Corinthians
- Santo André
- 2021–2025: Red Bull Bragantino
- 2025: → Coritiba (loan)
- 2025: → Coimbra (loan)

Senior career*
Years	Team	Apps	(Gls)
2026–	Vancouver FC	1	(0)
2026–	→ Langley United (loan)	4	(3)
- * Club domestic league appearances and goals as of September 14, 2026

Vitor Lucas de Araujo (born 5 April 2006) is a Brazilian professional footballer who plays for Vancouver FC in the Canadian Premier League.

== Early life ==
He played youth football with Coritiba, Coimbra, and Red Bull Bragantino.

== Club career ==
In March 2026, he signed a three-year contract with Canadian Premier League club Vancouver FC. On April 11, 2026, he debuted with their affiliate club Langley United in the British Columbia Premier League, scoring twice in a 5-0 victory over Kamloops United FC.

== Career statistics ==
As of September 20, 2026

Club	Season	League			Playoffs		Domestic Cup		Continental		Total	
Club	Season	Division	Apps	Goals	Apps	Goals	Apps	Goals	Apps	Goals	Apps	Goals
Vancouver FC	2026	Canadian Premier League	1	0	0	0	0	0	0	0	1	0
Langley United (loan)	2026	British Columbia Premier League	4	3	–		0	0	–		4	3
Career total			5	3	0	0	0	0	0	0	5	3
