= Marsel Bibishkov =

Canadian soccer player (born 2007)

Personal information
- Full name: Marsel Krum Bibishkov
- Date of birth: 11 April 2007 (age 19)
- Place of birth: Sofia, Bulgaria
- Height: 1.90 m (6 ft 3 in)
- Position: Forward

Team information
- Current team: Vancouver FC

Youth career
- 2011–2016: DIT Sofia
- 2016–2017: CFA Toronto
- 2017–2022: Toronto FC
- 2019: → Real Mississauga
- 2022–2023: Pirin Blagoevgrad
- 2023–2024: Juventus

Senior career*
Years	Team	Apps	(Gls)
2022–2023	Pirin Blagoevgrad	2	(0)
2025	York United	0	(0)
2025	→ York United Academy (loan)	3	(2)
2025	Septemvri Sofia II	7	(1)
2025	Septemvri Sofia	4	(0)
2026–	Vancouver FC	1	(0)
2026–	→ Langley United (loan)	4	(1)

International career^{‡}
2022–2023	Bulgaria U16	5	(1)
2023	Bulgaria U17	2	(0)
2025	Canada U18	1	(0)
2025–	Canada U20	10	(6)
- * Club domestic league appearances and goals as of October 7, 2026 ‡ National team caps and goals as of August 8, 2026

Marsel Krum Bibishkov (Bulgarian: Марсел Крум Бибишков; born 11 April 2007) is a professional footballer who plays as a forward for Canadian Premier League side Vancouver FC. Born in Bulgaria, he has represented Canada and Bulgaria at youth level.

== Career ==
Born in Sofia, Bulgaria, Marsel is the son of former Bulgaria international player Krum Bibishkov. He started his career in DIT Sofia Academy, before moving to Toronto, Canada with his family. He joined Canada First Academy, where he was coached by his father, before moving to Toronto FC Academy. After several unsuccessful tryouts in Italy, he once more trained under his father's tutelage this time in his father's academy team in 2019.

In June 2022 he returned to Bulgaria and signed a contract with Pirin Blagoevgrad. He made his debut for Pirin at the age of 15 on 19 November 2022 in a cup match against Chavdar Etropole. He completed his professional debut for the team on 5 March 2023 in a league match against Ludogorets Razgrad.

In July 2023, after having a successful trial, he signed a contract with Juventus Academy. Bibishkov would help the Juventus youth side win an international tournament held in Berlin, Germany.

On 29 January 2025, Bibishkov signed a two-year contract with options for two additional years with Canadian Premier League side York United. In June 2025, he terminated the remainder of his contract by mutual consent.

In June 2025, he was reported to have signed with Slavia Sofia in the Bulgarian first tier. Despite training with the team and being presented, on 9 August 2025 he signed a contract with Septemvri Sofia, the parrent team of his first youth team. He made his professional debut for the team on 11 August 2025, in a league match against Beroe.

In March 2026, he returned to the Canadian Premier League, signing with Vancouver FC.

== International career ==
Marsel holds dual citizenship making him available for both Bulgaria and Canada. He received his first call-up for Bulgaria U16 in 2022 and scored his first goal in a friendly match against North Macedonia U16 on 23 March 2023.

In August 2025, he was called up to the Canada U18 team for a series of friendlies.

== Career statistics ==
As of October 7, 2026

Club	Season	League			Domestic Cup		Continental		Other		Total	
Club	Season	Division	Apps	Goal	Apps	Goals	Apps	Goals	Apps	Goals	Apps	Goals
Pirin Blagoevgrad	2022–23	First League	2	0	1	0	—		—		3	0
York United FC	2025	Canadian Premier League	0	0	0	0	—		0	0	0	0
York United FC Academy	2025	League1 Ontario Championship	3	2	—		—		0	0	3	2
Vancouver FC	2026	Canadian Premier League	1	0	0	0	—		0	0	1	0
Langley United (loan)	2026	British Columbia Premier League	4	1	0	0	—		—		4	1
Career total			10	3	1	0	0	0	0	0	11	3
