= Lys Mousset =

French footballer (born 1996)

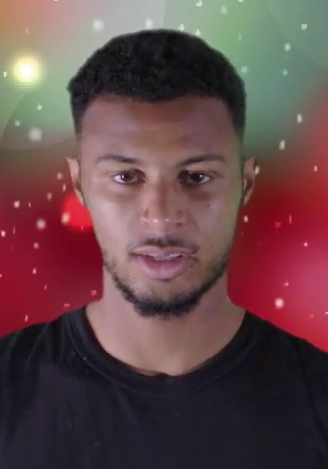
- Mousset in 2018

Personal information
- Full name: Lys Émilien Mousset
- Date of birth: 8 February 1996 (age 30)
- Place of birth: Montivilliers, France
- Height: 1.84 m (6 ft 0 in)
- Position: Forward

Team information
- Current team: Vancouver FC
- Number: 9

Youth career
- 2003–2004: Soquence Graville
- 2004–2006: Havre Caucriauville
- 2006–2012: Le Havre

Senior career*
| Years | Team | Apps | (Gls) |
| 2012–2015 | Le Havre B | 57 | (14) |
| 2014–2016 | Le Havre | 34 | (14) |
| 2016–2019 | AFC Bournemouth | 58 | (3) |
| 2019–2022 | Sheffield United | 48 | (9) |
| 2022 | → Salernitana (loan) | 4 | (0) |
| 2022–2024 | VfL Bochum | 0 | (0) |
| 2023 | → Nîmes (loan) | 11 | (1) |
| 2025 | Bohemians | 9 | (1) |
| 2026– | Vancouver FC | 20 | (5) |
| 2026 | → Langley United (loan) | 1 | (1) |

International career
| 2015–2016 | France U20 | 8 | (1) |
| 2017–2018 | France U21 | 8 | (5) |
- * Club domestic league appearances and goals as of 11:16, 11 November 2026 (UTC)

Lys Émilien Mousset (born 8 February 1996) is a French professional footballer who plays as a forward for Canadian Premier League club Vancouver FC.

== Club career ==
=== Le Havre ===
Mousset joined the Le Havre academy in 2006, after playing for local clubs Soquence Graville and Havre Caucriauville. He began playing for the reserve side in 2012, where he impressed, before making his debut for the first team in 2014. Mousset would go on to score fourteen goals in thirty-six games for Le Havre.

=== AFC Bournemouth ===
On 30 June 2016, Mousset joined AFC Bournemouth from Le Havre for a €7.3 million transfer fee. He scored his first goal for Bournemouth in an FA Cup tie against Wigan Athletic on 6 January 2018.

=== Sheffield United ===
On 21 July 2019, Mousset signed for newly promoted Premier League club Sheffield United. The Blades paid a club-record fee in the region of £10 million for Mousset, and he put pen to paper on a three-year contract. On 21 September 2019, He scored his first goal for Sheffield United in a 2–0 away win against Everton. On 30 September Wilder confirmed that Mousset's toe injury could keep him out for at least another two months. He still finished the 2019–20 season as joint highest scorer for Sheffield United along with Oli McBurnie on six goals, and joint highest assist provider along with Enda Stevens on four assists.

==== Loan to Salernitana ====
On 31 January 2022, Mousset was loaned to Serie A club Salernitana until the end of the season. He made just 4 appearances during his time with the club, failing to score.

=== VfL Bochum ===
On 15 August 2022, Mousset signed a two-year contract with VfL Bochum in Germany. In January 2023, Mousset was suspended from the team due to disciplinary issues including a "lack of motivation, unpunctuality and unprofessionalism", with Bochum sporting director Patrick Fabian stating: "We kept giving him a chance, now there's no point. It's pretty disappointing because we naturally had a lot of hopes from him in terms of sport. At some point, however, the time has come when we have to protect the group as a whole." He was loaned out to Ligue 2 club Nîmes on 31 January 2023. He suffered a ruptured Achilles tendon in May 2023 with Nîmes. On 9 January 2024, Mousset's contract with Bochum was terminated by mutual consent, without having played a game for the club.

=== Bohemians ===
After spending 13 months without a club, on 5 February 2025, Mousset signed for League of Ireland Premier Division club Bohemians following a successful trial period with the club. He made his debut for the club on 16 February 2025, in a 1–0 win over Shamrock Rovers in the Dublin Derby at the Aviva Stadium. On 10 May 2025, he scored his first goal for the club on his 9th appearance, with an 88th minute winner 10 minutes after coming off the bench in a 1–0 win away to Sligo Rovers at The Showgrounds. That proved to be his final appearance for Bohs as on 2 July 2025, it was announced that he had left the club by mutual consent, with manager Alan Reynolds stating "Getting him fit was the issue. We tried everything with him. All the staff did. But he picked up niggles and things like that which slowed it down all the time. One thing is for sure, if he wants to play football, he needs to get fit."

=== Vancouver FC ===
On 23 March 2026, Canadian Premier League club Vancouver FC announced the signing of Mousset for the 2026 season with an option to extend through 2027. On 10 April 2026, he appeared with their affiliate club Langley United in the British Columbia Premier League, scoring in the match against Kamloops United FC.

== International career ==
Mousset was born in France to a Senegalese father and a French mother, and is eligible for both countries. He made his France U20 debut in 2015.

== Career statistics ==
As of match played 17 October 2026

Appearances and goals by club, season and competition
| Club | Season | League | | | National cup (Note: Includes Coupe de France, FA Cup, DFB-Pokal & Canadian Championship) | | League cup (Note: Includes Coupe de la Ligue & EFL Cup) | | Other | | Total | |
| Club | Season | Division | Apps | Goals | Apps | Goals | Apps | Goals | Apps | Goals | Apps | Goals |
|---|---|---|---|---|---|---|---|---|---|---|---|---|
| Le Havre | 2013–14 | Ligue 2 | 5 | 0 | 0 | 0 | 0 | 0 | — | | 5 | 0 |
| Le Havre | 2014–15 | Ligue 2 | 1 | 0 | 1 | 0 | 0 | 0 | — | | 2 | 0 |
| Le Havre | 2015–16 | Ligue 2 | 28 | 14 | 0 | 0 | 1 | 0 | — | | 29 | 14 |
| Le Havre | Total | | 34 | 14 | 1 | 0 | 1 | 0 | — | | 36 | 14 |
| AFC Bournemouth | 2016–17 | Premier League | 11 | 0 | 1 | 0 | 2 | 0 | — | | 14 | 0 |
| AFC Bournemouth | 2017–18 | Premier League | 23 | 2 | 2 | 1 | 4 | 0 | — | | 29 | 3 |
| AFC Bournemouth | 2018–19 | Premier League | 24 | 1 | 1 | 0 | 3 | 1 | — | | 28 | 2 |
| AFC Bournemouth | Total | | 58 | 3 | 4 | 1 | 9 | 1 | — | | 71 | 5 |
| Sheffield United | 2019–20 | Premier League | 30 | 6 | 1 | 0 | 2 | 0 | — | | 33 | 6 |
| Sheffield United | 2020–21 | Premier League | 11 | 0 | 2 | 0 | 0 | 0 | — | | 13 | 0 |
| Sheffield United | 2021–22 | Championship | 7 | 3 | 0 | 0 | 0 | 0 | — | | 7 | 3 |
| Sheffield United | Total | | 48 | 9 | 3 | 0 | 2 | 0 | — | | 53 | 9 |
| Salernitana (loan) | 2021–22 | Serie A | 4 | 0 | — | | — | | — | | 4 | 0 |
| VfL Bochum | 2022–23 | Bundesliga | 0 | 0 | 0 | 0 | — | | — | | 0 | 0 |
| VfL Bochum | 2023–24 | Bundesliga | 0 | 0 | 0 | 0 | — | | — | | 0 | 0 |
| VfL Bochum | Total | | 0 | 0 | 0 | 0 | — | | — | | 0 | 0 |
| Nîmes (loan) | 2022–23 | Ligue 2 | 11 | 1 | — | | — | | — | | 11 | 1 |
| Bohemians | 2025 | LOI Premier Division | 9 | 1 | — | | — | | 0 (Note: Appearance(s) in the Leinster Senior Cup) | 0 | 9 | 1 |
| Vancouver FC | 2026 | Canadian Premier League | 20 | 5 | 2 | 0 | — | | 0 | 0 | 22 | 5 |
| Langley United (loan) | 2026 | British Columbia Premier League | 1 | 1 | — | | — | | — | | 1 | 1 |
| Career total | | | 185 | 34 | 10 | 1 | 12 | 1 | 0 | 0 | 206 | 36 |
