= Matheus de Souza =

Canadian soccer player (born 2005)

Personal information
- Date of birth: October 1, 2005 (age 21)
- Place of birth: Surrey, British Columbia, Canada
- Height: 6 ft 4 in (1.93 m)
- Position: Goalkeeper

Team information
- Current team: Vancouver FC

Youth career
- Surrey United SC
- 2021–2024: Vancouver Whitecaps FC

College career
Years	Team	Apps	(Gls)
2025–	UFV Cascades	16	(0)

Senior career*
Years	Team	Apps	(Gls)
2023–2024	Whitecaps FC Academy	4	(0)
2024	Whitecaps FC 2	0	(0)
2025	Langley United	14	(0)
2025	→ Vancouver FC (loan)	0	(0)
2026–	Vancouver FC	1	(0)
- * Club domestic league appearances and goals as of April 7, 2026

Matheus de Souza (born October 1, 2005) is a Canadian soccer player who plays for Vancouver FC in the Canadian Premier League.

== Early life ==
de Souza played youth soccer with Surrey United SC, before joining the Vancouver Whitecaps FC Academy in 2021.

== University career ==
In 2025, de Souza began attending the University of the Fraser Valley, where he played for the men's soccer team. During the 2025 season, he set program records with the most clean sheets in a season and the longest shutout sheet with 462 minutes and 35 seconds. At the end of his first season, he was named to the Canada West All-Rookie Team, Canada West First Team All-Star, and a U Sports Second Team All-Canadian.

== Club career ==
In 2023, he began playing with the Whitecaps FC Academy in League1 British Columbia. During the 2024 season, he served as an unused substitute for multiple matches with Whitecaps FC 2 in MLS Next Pro. In 2025, he joined Langley United. In June 2025, he joined Vancouver FC in the Canadian Premier League on a short-term basis due to goalkeeper injuries.

At the 2026 CPL-U Sports Draft, de Souza was selected in the first round (fifth overall) by Vancouver FC. In January 2026, he signed a U Sports contract with the club, allowing him to maintain his university eligibility. On April 5, 2026, he made his debut in the season opener against Cavalry FC.

== Career statistics ==
As of August 4, 2025

Club	Season	League			Playoffs		Domestic Cup		League Cup		Total	
Club	Season	Division	Apps	Goals	Apps	Goals	Apps	Goals	Apps	Goals	Apps	Goals
Whitecaps FC Academy	2023	League1 British Columbia	1	0	0	0	–		–		1	0
Whitecaps FC Academy	2023	League1 British Columbia	3	0	1	0	–		–		4	0
Whitecaps FC Academy	Total		4	0	1	0	0	0	0	0	5	0
Whitecaps FC 2	2024	MLS Next Pro	0	0	0	0	–		–		0	0
Langley United	2025	League1 British Columbia	14	0	–		–		–		14	0
Vancouver FC (loan)	2025	Canadian Premier League	0	0	–		0	0	–		0	0
Vancouver FC	2026	Canadian Premier League	1	0	–		0	0	0	0	1	0
Vancouver FC	Total		1	0	0	0	0	0	0	0	1	0
Career total			19	0	1	0	0	0	0	0	20	0
