= Tom Field =

Irish footballer (born 1997)

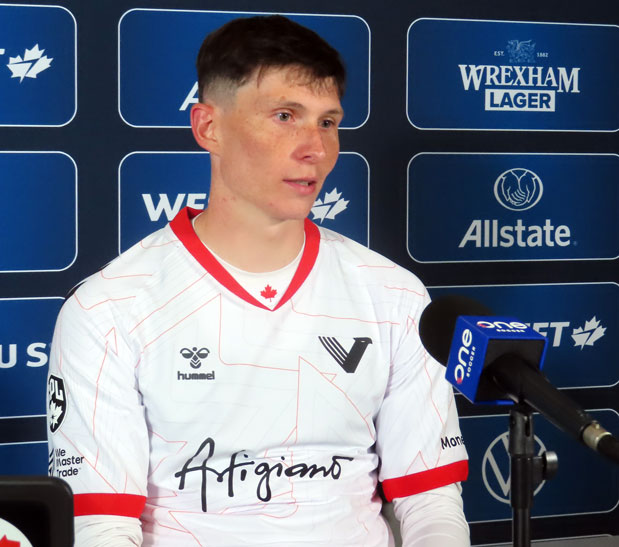
- Field while with Vancouver FC in 2026

Personal information
- Full name: Thomas Geoffrey Field
- Date of birth: 14 March 1997 (age 29)
- Place of birth: Kingston upon Thames, England
- Height: 5 ft 10 in (1.78 m)
- Position: Left back

Team information
- Current team: Vancouver FC
- Number: 30

Youth career
- Kingstonian
- –2012: Leatherhead
- 2012–2015: Brentford

Senior career*
Years	Team	Apps	(Gls)
2015–2020	Brentford	17	(1)
2017–2018	→ Bradford City (loan)	8	(0)
2018–2019	→ Cheltenham Town (loan)	6	(0)
2020	Dundee	1	(0)
2021–2022	Cavalry FC	11	(0)
2023	Calgary Foothills	0	(0)
2023–2025	Cavalry FC	41	(0)
2026–	Vancouver FC	27	(0)

International career
2012	Republic of Ireland U16	2	(0)
- * Club domestic league appearances and goals as of 12:34, 27 October 2026 (UTC)

Thomas Geoffrey Field (born 14 March 1997) is a professional footballer who plays as a left-back for Canadian Premier League club Vancouver FC. Born in England, he represented the Republic of Ireland at youth level.

A product of the Brentford Academy, Field graduated into the senior team in 2016. A fringe player, he departed to join Dundee in 2020. He moved to Canada later that year and played for Cavalry FC, Calgary Foothills and Vancouver FC. Born in England, Field was capped by the Republic of Ireland at U16 level.

== Club career ==
=== Brentford ===
==== Youth years (2012–2016) ====
Field began his career with spells in the youth systems at non-League clubs Kingstonian and Leatherhead and then joined the academy at Brentford at age 15. He was a part of the Bees' U15 team which won the Junior category in the 2012 Milk Cup. Field progressed to sign scholarship forms at the end of the 2012–13 season and made 45 appearances and scored two goals for the youth team over the following two seasons.

Moving from the wing to left back, Field made his Development Squad debut while an U17 and signed a one-year Development Squad contract at the end of the 2014–15 season. Field signed a new 18-month contract in November 2015 and made his first team debut with a start in a 3–0 victory over West London rivals Fulham on 30 April 2016. He assisted Scott Hogan for one of the goals from a corner, but was forced off after 53 minutes with a calf injury.

==== First team (2016–17) ====
Field was promoted into the first team group during the 2016–17 pre-season. The departure of long-term left back Jake Bidwell on 1 July 2016 meant that Field became the club's only available senior left back, which allowed him to play the full 90 minutes in friendlies versus Vfl Bochum and Wycombe Wanderers. Field made his first competitive appearance of the season versus Exeter City in the EFL Cup first round on 9 August 2016, and played the full 120 minutes of the extra time defeat, but he could not break into the league lineup due to the arrival of loan left back Callum Elder.

After a period out with an injured groin, Field made his first league appearance of the 2016–17 season as a second-half substitute for Yoann Barbet during a 2–1 victory over Burton Albion on 10 December. After two further starts, Field signed a 3 1/2-year first team contract on 23 December. He scored the first senior goals of his career with a brace in a 5–1 FA Cup third round victory over Eastleigh on 7 January 2017. Field lost his place to fit-again Rico Henry in February and ended the 2016–17 season with 17 appearances and three goals.

==== Out of favour (2017–2020) ====
With ample cover for Rico Henry at full back, Field joined League One club Bradford City on loan until 1 January 2018, as cover for the injured Adam Chicksen. He made five appearances before dropping to the bench in mid-September after Chicksen returned to fitness. Despite Chicksen suffering a long-term injury in mid-October, Field made just three further appearances before returning to Brentford when his loan expired. Field's only call into a Brentford matchday squad during the second half of 2017–18 came on the final day of the season, when he was an unused substitute during a 1–1 draw with Hull City.

After two EFL Cup appearances in August 2018, Field joined League Two club Cheltenham Town on loan until 1 January 2019. During an injury-affected spell, he made just 11 appearances before his loan expired. After his return to Brentford, injuries to full backs Henrik Dalsgaard and Rico Henry saw Field make his final appearance of the season as a substitute for stand-in right back Sergi Canós after 83 minutes of a 1–0 win over Aston Villa on 13 February 2019.

After failing to win a call into a matchday squad thus far during the 2019–20 season, Field was made available for transfer in January 2020. He departed the club on the final day of the January 2020 transfer window and ended his time at Griffin Park with 21 appearances and three goals.

=== Dundee ===
On 31 January 2020, Field joined Scottish Championship club Dundee on a contract running until the end of the 2019–20 season. Field made his only appearance for the club as a substitute for Declan McDaid after 75 minutes of a 0–0 draw with Ayr United on 7 March 2020. As a result of the COVID-19 pandemic leading to the suspension and cancellation of the season, Field's contract was extended to 1 July, after which he was released.

=== Cavalry FC ===
On 28 December 2020, Field signed a multi-year contract with Canadian Premier League club Cavalry FC. Either side of three months sidelined with a torn hip flexor, he made 12 appearances during a 2021 season which ended with defeat in the play-off semi-finals. Field was retained for the 2022 season, but missed the club's pre-season training camp due to a "freak training accident", in which he ruptured "pretty much everything in my knee and then my hamstring came off in two different places around my knee as well". He immediately underwent surgery and on 8 November 2022, after missing the entire regular season, it was announced that Field had departed the club.

=== Calgary Foothills ===
In January 2023, Field joined FC Tigers Vancouver for off-season training and he trialled unsuccessfully with Vancouver FC. On 5 May 2023, he transferred to League1 Alberta club Calgary Foothills and played in the non-competitive 2023 Exhibition Series season. Off the back of an unbeaten regular season, Field captained the club to victory in the championship final.

=== Return to Cavalry FC ===
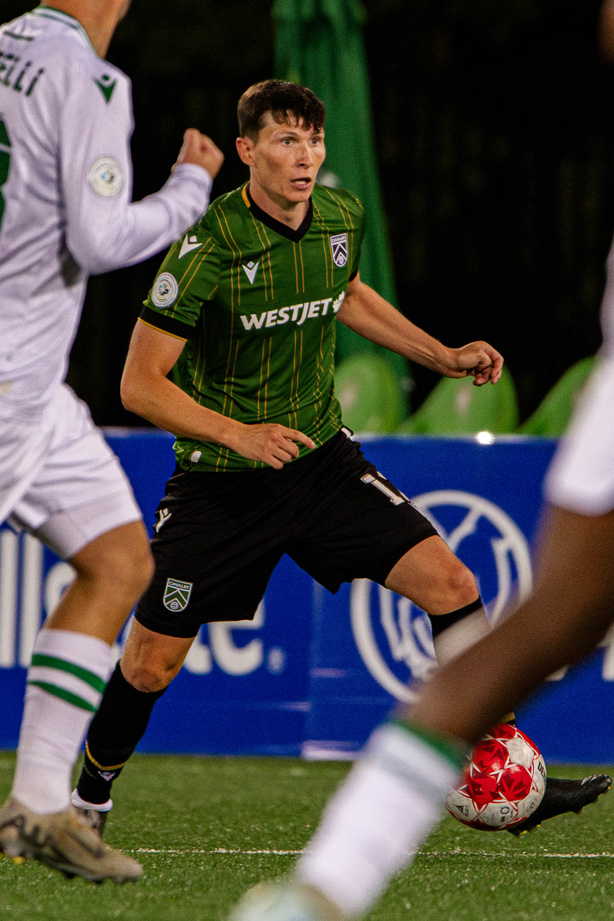
Field playing for Cavalry FC in 2025.

Having proved his fitness while away from the club, Field returned to Cavalry FC on 11 August 2023 and signed a contract running until the end of the 2023 season, with the option of a further year. He made four appearances during the remainder of the season, which culminated in defeat in the 2023 Canadian Premier League final. On 25 January 2024, the club exercised its option on Field's contract for the 2024 season. He made 22 appearances during the 2024 season, which culminated in victory in the 2024 Canadian Premier League final. Field signed a new contract for the 2025 season, with the option of a further year. He made 21 appearances during the season, which culminated in defeat in the 2025 Canadian Premier League final. Field was released at the end of the season, when the club declined to take up the option on his contract.

=== Vancouver FC ===
On 12 January 2026, Field transferred to Canadian Premier League club Vancouver FC and signed a one-year contract, with the option of a further year.

== International career ==
Field was capped by the Republic of Ireland U16 team in two friendlies versus Estonia in Dublin in November 2012.

== Personal life ==
Field is a Brentford supporter.

== Career statistics ==
As of match played 2 August 2026

Appearances and goals by club, season and competition
Club	Season	League			National cup (Note: Includes FA Cup, Canadian Championship)		League cup (Note: Includes EFL Cup)		Continental		Other		Total	
Club	Season	Division	Apps	Goals	Apps	Goals	Apps	Goals	Apps	Goals	Apps	Goals	Apps	Goals
Brentford	2015–16	Championship	1	0	0	0	0	0	—		—		1	0
Brentford	2016–17	Championship	15	1	1	2	1	0	—		—		17	3
Brentford	2017–18	Championship	0	0	0	0	—		—		—		0	0
Brentford	2018–19	Championship	1	0	—		2	0	—		—		3	0
Brentford	Total		17	1	1	2	3	0	—		—		21	3
Bradford City (loan)	2017–18	League One	8	0	0	0	1	0	—		0	0	9	0
Cheltenham Town (loan)	2018–19	League Two	6	0	1	0	—		—		4 (Note: Appearances in EFL Trophy)	0	11	0
Dundee	2019–20	Scottish Championship	1	0	—		—		—		—		1	0
Cavalry FC	2021	Canadian Premier League	11	0	0	0	—		—		1 (Note: Appearance(s) in Canadian Premier League play-offs)	0	12	0
Cavalry FC	2023	Canadian Premier League	4	0	—		—		—		—		4	0
Cavalry FC	2024	Canadian Premier League	21	0	1	0	—		0	0	0	0	22	0
Cavalry FC	2025	Canadian Premier League	16	0	1	0	—		1 (Note: Appearance(s) in CONCACAF Champions Cup)	0	3	0	21	0
Cavalry FC	Total		52	0	2	0	—		1	0	4	0	59	0
Vancouver FC	2026	Canadian Premier League	14	0	3	1	—		2	0	—		19	1
Career total			98	1	7	3	4	0	3	0	8	0	120	4

== Honours ==
Calgary Foothills

- League1 Alberta Exhibition Series: 2023

Cavalry FC

- Canadian Premier League: 2024
