= Isak Ssewankambo =

Swedish footballer

Personal information
- Full name: Isak Shumai Ssewankambo
- Date of birth: 27 February 1996 (age 30)
- Place of birth: Angered, Sweden
- Height: 1.79 m (5 ft 10 in)
- Positions: Defender; midfielder

Team information
- Current team: Vancouver FC

Youth career
- 2001–2005: Lärje-Angereds IF
- 2005–2007: IFK Göteborg
- 2007–2012: Lärje-Angereds IF
- 2012–2014: Chelsea

Senior career*
| Years | Team | Apps | (Gls) |
| 2014 | NAC Breda | 13 | (0) |
| 2015–2016 | Derby County | 0 | (0) |
| 2016–2018 | Molde | 30 | (0) |
| 2018 | → Malmö (loan) | 5 | (0) |
| 2019–2021 | Östersund | 70 | (3) |
| 2022 | Sirius | 9 | (0) |
| 2023–2024 | IFK Norrköping | 13 | (0) |
| 2025–2026 | IF Brommapojkarna | 10 | (0) |
| 2026– | Vancouver FC | 10 | (0) |

International career
| 2012–2013 | Sweden U17 | 19 | (2) |
| 2013–2014 | Sweden U19 | 9 | (1) |
| 2014–2018 | Sweden U21 | 21 | (1) |
- * Club domestic league appearances and goals as of 27 October 2026

Isak Ssali Ssewankambo (born 27 February 1996) is a Swedish professional footballer who plays as a defender in the Canadian Premier League club Vancouver.

== Club career ==
=== Early career ===
Ssewankambo started playing football at age five and immediately joined Lärje-Angereds IF. He then moved to IFK Göteborg when he was nine and after two years later, returned to Lärje-Angereds IF. At fourteen, Ssewankambo left Sweden to move to Premier League side Chelsea, bringing his family with him. During his time at Chelsea, Ssewankambo played in the club's Reserves and Academy.

After being released by Chelsea, Ssewankambo joined Eredivisie side NAC Breda on a one-year contract with an option for another year. Upon joining the club, he explained leaving Chelsea, citing first team football. Ssewankambo made his NAC Breda debut (also his professional debut) in the opening game of the season, as the club drew 1–1 against Excelsior. Since joining NAC Breda, he quickly established himself in the starting eleven, playing in the right–back position. By the time Ssewankambo left the club, he made fifteen appearances in all competitions.

It was announced on 2 January 2015 that Ssewankambo joined Derby County of the Sky Bet Championship following a trial. Immediately after joining the club, he was assigned to Derby County's reserve team for the rest of the 2014–15 season. Ahead of the 2015–16 season, Ssewankambo was given a number thirty shirt for the club. He made his debut for Derby County in a League Cup tie against Portsmouth on 12 August 2015. Following this, Ssewankambo returned to playing for the club's reserve side. However, his time at the club was overshadowed by injuries.

=== Molde FK ===
On 3 March 2016, Ssewankambo left Derby County to join manager Ole Gunnar Solskjær at Molde FK for an undisclosed fee, signing a three–year contract.

He made his debut for the club, coming on as an 85th-minute substitute, in a 1–1 draw against Tromsø in the opening game of the season. Following this, Ssewankambo made his seven starts for the next seven matches for Molde. However, during a 1–0 win against Aalesunds on 30 April 2016, he suffered a knee injury, resulting being substituted in the 57th minute and was sidelined for two months. It wasn't until on 23 July 2016 when Ssewankambo made his return to the first team, coming on as a second-half substitute, in a 1–0 loss against Sarpsborg 08. However, his return was short–lived when he suffered another knee injury that kept him out for three months. It wasn't until on 30 October 2016 when Ssewankambo made his return to the first team against Stabæk, starting a match and played 71 minutes before being substituted, in a 3–0 win. At the end of the 2016 season, he went on to make eleven appearances in all competitions.

However at the start of the 2017 season, Ssewankambo suffered a muscle injury while on international duty that saw him out for the club's first six league matches. It wasn't until on 6 May 2017 when he returned to the first team, coming on as a 78th-minute substitute, in a 1–0 loss against Aalesunds. Ssewankambo started in the next three matches for Molde before missing the next three matches, due to international duty with Sweden U21. It wasn't until on 26 June 2017 when he made his return to the first team, coming on as a 70th-minute substitute, in a 1–1 draw against Strømsgodset. Following this, Ssewankambo regained his first team place, where he played in different positions in the defence and midfield position. Ssewankambo later helped the club finish second place in the league after drawing 2–2 against Sarpsborg in the last game of the season. At the end of the 2017 season, he went on to make twenty–one appearances in all competitions.

After a short loan spell at Malmö FF, Ssewankambo made his first appearance of the 2018 season, coming on as a second-half substitute in the second leg of the UEFA Europa League second round against KF Laçi, as Molde FK won 2–0 to advance to the next round of the tournament. Following this, he found his playing time, mostly coming from the substitute bench, making four more appearances for Molde FK. At the end of the 2018 season, Ssewankambo went on to make five appearances in all competitions. Following this, he was released by the club after they did not offer him a new contract.

==== Loan to Malmö FF ====
It was announced on 19 March 2018 when Ssewankambo joined Malmö on loan until the summer.

He made his debut for the club, coming on as a late substitute, in a 2–1 win against Elfsborg in the opening game of the season. Ssewankambo appeared as an unused substitute in the Svenska Cupen Final against Djurgården, as Malmö FF lost 3–0. He later made four more appearances for Malmö FF, making a total of five appearances in all competitions. On 13 July 2018, Ssewankambo returned to his parent club after the club decided against signing him on a permanent basis.

=== Östersunds FK ===
It was announced on 21 February 2019 that Ssewankambo joined Östersunds FK on a three-year contract, until December 2021.

He made his debut for the club, starting the whole game in the right–midfield position, in a 0–0 draw against AIK in the opening game of the season. Since joining Östersunds FK, Ssewankambo quickly established himself, playing in different positions in the defence and midfield. It wasn't until on 29 April 2019 when he scored his first goal for the club, in a 3–0 win against Helsingborg. Following Östersunds FK's 3–0 win against IK Sirius on 6 July 2019, Ssewankambo was subjected of attention after the opposition team reported claims that the club breached the requirements for home-grown players on him. Following an investigation, no charges were taken against Östersunds FK. Shortly after, he suffered a knee injury during a 0–0 draw against Malmö FF on 28 July 2019 and was substituted at half time. It was announced that Ssewankambo was out for a month. It wasn't until on 14 September 2019 when he returned to the first team, coming on as a 63rd-minute substitute, in a 2–1 loss against Kalmar. However, his return was short–lived when Ssewankambo was suspended for one match after he was booked for a yellow during the match against Kalmar. But Ssewankambo returned to the starting line–up against Örebro on 25 September 2019, as the club lost 2–0. His second goal for Östersund FK then came on 19 October 2019 against IK Sirius, as the club won 2–0, ending their twelve matches without a win. After the match, he was named Team of the Week by Aftonbladet. Eventually, Östersund FK managed to avoid relegation despite losing the last two remaining matches of the 2019 season. In his first season at the club, Ssewankambo made twenty–four appearances and scoring two times in all competitions.

At the start of the 2020 season, Ssewankambo appeared three times in Östersunds FK's matches in the Svenska Cupen. However, due to the pandemic, the season was pushed back to three months. Once the season resumed, he continued to regain his first team place, playing in the defensive midfield position. It wasn't until on 1 July 2020 when Ssewankambo scored his first goal of the season, in a 2–1 win against Kalmar. He also later set up two goals for the club, coming against Elfsborg on 23 August 2020 and then later against Hammarby on 25 October 2020. Ssewankambo captained Östersunds FK for the first time in his career against IK Sirius on 18 October 2020, as he helped the club win 3–2. Despite missing two matches during the 2020 season, Ssewankambo went on to make thirty–one appearances and scoring once in all competitions.

=== Sirius ===
On 31 March 2022, Ssewankambo joined Sirius until the summer of 2022. He left Sirius in June 2022 after his contract expired.

=== IFK Norrköping ===
In November 2022, IFK Norrköping announced that they had signed Ssewankambo on a two-year contract.

=== IF Brommapojkarna ===
On 28 June 2025, Ssewankambo signed for IF Brommapojkarna on a contract until end of 2025.

== International career ==
Ssewankambo is eligible to play for Sweden and Uganda.

=== Sweden youth teams ===
In May 2012, Ssewankambo was called up to the Sweden U16 squad for the first time. He made his U16 national team debut, starting a match and played 76 minutes before being substituted, in a 2–0 win against Bulgaria U16 on 29 May 2012. Ssewankambo scored his first Sweden U16 goal, in a 4–1 win against Faroe Islands U19 on 9 August 2012. This was followed up by scoring his second U16 national team goal, in a 2–0 win against England U16. He went on to make nine appearances and scoring two times for Sweden U16.

In September 2012, Ssewankambo was called up to the Sweden U17 for the first time. He made his U17 national team debut, starting the whole game, in a 1–1 draw against Republic of Ireland U17 on 29 September 2012. Ssewankambo then set up two goals for Sweden U21, as they beat Belarus U17 on 26 March 2013. In April 2013, he was called up to the U17 national team squad for the UEFA European Under-17 Championship. Ssewankambo played four times in the tournament, as the U17 national team were eliminated in the semi–finals against Russia U17. For his performance, he was named Team of the Tournament, along with four of his teammates. Following the tournament, he captained Sweden U17 for the first time, starting a match and played 80 minutes before being substituted, in a 1–1 draw against Iraq U17 on 5 September 2013. Shortly after, Ssewankambo was called up to the U17 national team squad for the FIFA U-17 World Cup. However, he suffered a thigh injury while training and missed the opening game of the group stage match against Iraq U17. But Ssewankambo did make an appearance for Sweden U17 in the tournament against Nigeria U17 on 22 October 2013, coming on as a 75th-minute substitute, in a 3–3 draw. However, he was once again injured and never played in the tournament again. Ssewankambo went on to make thirteen appearances and scoring once for the U17 national team.

In February 2014, Ssewankambo was called up to the Sweden U19 squad for the first time. He made his debut for the U19 national team, starting the whole game in the right–back position, in a 3–0 loss against Iceland U19 on 4 March 2014. Ssewankambo went on to play in the right–back position for four more matches for Sweden U19. It wasn't until on 12 November 2014 when he scored his first U19 national team goal, in a 2–2 draw against Ukraine U19. Ssewankambo went on to make nine appearances and scoring once for Sweden U19.

In May 2014, Ssewankambo was called up to the Sweden U21 squad for the first time. He made his debut for the U21 national team, coming on as an 81st-minute substitute, in a 2–0 win against Sweden U21 on 4 June 2014. Three months later on 9 September 2014, Ssewankambo made his first start for Sweden U21 and played the whole game, in a 4–3 win against Turkey U21. In a follow–up match, he made another start for the U21 national team and played 73 minutes before being substituted, in a 2–0 loss against France U21. In a return leg, Ssewankambo was placed on the substitute bench, as the U21 national team managed to overcome the deficit by beating them 4–1 to qualify for the UEFA European Under-21 Championship. He made two appearances for Sweden U21 between 11 June 2015 and 16 June 2015 against Denmark U21 and Albania U21. However, Ssewankambo did not make the cut the U21 national team squad for the UEFA European Under-21 Championship. After spending almost a year away from the U21 national team, he made his first appearance for Sweden U21, starting a match against Serbia U21 on 24 March 2017, but suffered an injury that saw him substituted in the 10th minute. In May 2017, Ssewankambo was called up to the Sweden U21 squad for the UEFA European Under-21 Championship. However, he appeared three times as an unused substitute, as Sweden U21 were eliminated in the group stage tournament. Following this, Ssewankambo became a regular for the U21 national team, making ten consecutive starts between September 2017 and October 2018. During which, he scored his first Sweden U21 goal, in a 3–0 win against Malta U21 on 10 October 2017. However, in a match against Belgium U21 on 16 October 2018, Ssewankambo was sent–off in the 41st minute for a straight red card, in a 3–0 loss, in what turned out to be his last appearance for the U21 national team. Following this, he went on to make twenty–one appearances and scoring once for Sweden U21.

In June 2016, Ssewankambo was considered to be in a short–list for the Sweden Olympic squad ahead of the 2016 Summer Olympics in Rio de Janeiro, Brazil. However, he was failed to make the cut.

== Personal life ==
Ssewankambo has an older brother, Moses, who is his advisor. At the time at Chelsea, Ssewankambo resided in London, where he lived five miles from the Cobham Training Centre and his family residing in the city.

Ssewankambo revealed that he started out as a striker, saying: "I started as a striker. Everyone starts as a striker. But I thought I was better in midfield, you're involved in everything there. I like to be involved in a lot of things. I'm a midfielder, creating chances is big, but scoring is the best thing you can do." Since playing in the position, Ssewankambo also plays in a right–back position and different midfield positions.

In May 2018, while playing for Malmö FF, Ssewankambo and teammate Carlos Strandberg were rescued by the Swedish rescue service after being stranded at sea for twenty minutes.

== Career statistics ==
As of match played 24 November 2018

Appearances and goals by club, season and competition
| Club | Season | League | | | National Cup | | League Cup | | Continental | | Other | | Total | |
| Club | Season | Division | Apps | Goals | Apps | Goals | Apps | Goals | Apps | Goals | Apps | Goals | Apps | Goals |
|---|---|---|---|---|---|---|---|---|---|---|---|---|---|---|
| NAC Breda | 2014–15 | Eredivisie | 13 | 0 | 1 | 0 | — | | — | | — | | 14 | 0 |
| Derby County | 2015–16 | EFL Championship | 0 | 0 | 0 | 0 | 0 | 0 | — | | 0 | 0 | 0 | 0 |
| Derby County | 2016–17 | EFL Championship | 0 | 0 | 0 | 0 | 1 | 0 | — | | — | | 1 | 0 |
| Derby County | Total | | 0 | 0 | 0 | 0 | 1 | 0 | — | — | — | — | 1 | 0 |
| Molde | 2016 | Eliteserien | 9 | 0 | 2 | 0 | — | | — | | — | | 11 | 0 |
| Molde | 2017 | Eliteserien | 17 | 0 | 4 | 0 | — | | — | | — | | 21 | 0 |
| Molde | 2018 | Eliteserien | 4 | 0 | 0 | 0 | — | | 1 | 0 | — | | 5 | 0 |
| Molde | Total | | 30 | 0 | 6 | 0 | — | — | 1 | 0 | — | — | 37 | 0 |
| Malmö (loan) | 2018 | Allsvenskan | 5 | 0 | 0 | 0 | — | | 0 | 0 | — | | 5 | 0 |
| Career total | | | 48 | 0 | 7 | 0 | 1 | 0 | 1 | 0 | — | — | 57 | 0 |

== Honours ==
Sweden U17

- FIFA U-17 World Cup third place: 2013
