= Kian Proctor =

Canadian soccer player (born 2005)

Personal information
- Full name: Kian Hugh Proctor
- Date of birth: August 24, 2005 (age 21)
- Place of birth: Delta, British Columbia, Canada
- Height: 6 ft 3 in (1.91 m)
- Position: Defender

Team information
- Current team: Vancouver FC

Youth career
- North Delta FC
- Coastal FC

College career
| Years | Team | Apps | (Gls) |
| 2023 | UFV Cascades | 16 | (5) |
| 2024–2025 | Simon Fraser Red Leafs | 33 | (8) |

Senior career*
| Years | Team | Apps | (Gls) |
| 2023–2025 | TSS FC Rovers | 40 | (6) |
| 2026– | Vancouver FC | 26 | (2) |
- * Club domestic league appearances and goals as of October 27, 2026

Kian Hugh Proctor (born August 24, 2005) is a Canadian professional soccer player who plays for Canadian Premier League club Vancouver FC.

== Early life ==
Proctor played youth soccer with North Delta FC and Coastal FC, as well as the BC provincial program. In 2022, he played for Team BC at the 2022 Canada Summer Games.

== College career ==
In 2023, Proctor began attending the University of the Fraser Valley, where he played for the men's soccer team. On September 16, 2023, he scored his first goal in a 3-1 loss to the Alberta Golden Bears. At the end of the season, he was named to the Canada West All-Rookie Team and a Canada West Second Team All-Star.

In 2024, he moved to Simon Fraser University, where he joined the men's soccer team. On September 7, 2024, he scored his first goal, in a 3-0 victory over the Stanislaus State Warriors. On November 18, 2024, he scored a hat trick in a 4-2 victory over the Saint Martin's Saints, earning Great Northwest Athletic Conference Offensive Player of the Week honours. In 2025, he was named the GNAC Co-Defensive Player of the Year, and named to the All-GNAC First Team and the All-West Region Second Team.

== Club career ==
In 2023, Proctor began playing with TSS FC Rovers in League1 British Columbia.

In January 2026, he signed with Vancouver FC in the Canadian Premier League for the 2026 season, with options for 2027 and 2028. On February 5, 2026, he made his debut in the CONCACAF Champions League against Mexican side Cruz Azul.

== Career statistics ==
As of April 19, 2026

| Club | Season | League | | | Playoffs | | National Cup | | Continental | | Total | |
| Club | Season | Division | Apps | Goals | Apps | Goals | Apps | Goals | Apps | Goals | Apps | Goals |
|---|---|---|---|---|---|---|---|---|---|---|---|---|
| TSS FC Rovers | 2023 | League1 British Columbia | 13 | 4 | 1 | 0 | 0 | 0 | — | | 14 | 4 |
| TSS FC Rovers | 2024 | League1 British Columbia | 12 | 0 | 2 | 1 | 0 | 0 | — | | 14 | 1 |
| TSS FC Rovers | 2025 | League1 British Columbia | 15 | 2 | — | | 1 | 0 | — | | 16 | 2 |
| TSS FC Rovers | Total | | 40 | 6 | 3 | 1 | 1 | 0 | 0 | 0 | 44 | 7 |
| Vancouver FC | 2026 | Canadian Premier League | 2 | 0 | 0 | 0 | 0 | 0 | 2 | 0 | 4 | 0 |
| Career total | | | 42 | 6 | 3 | 1 | 1 | 0 | 2 | 0 | 48 | 7 |
