= Marcello Polisi =

Canadian soccer player (born 1997)

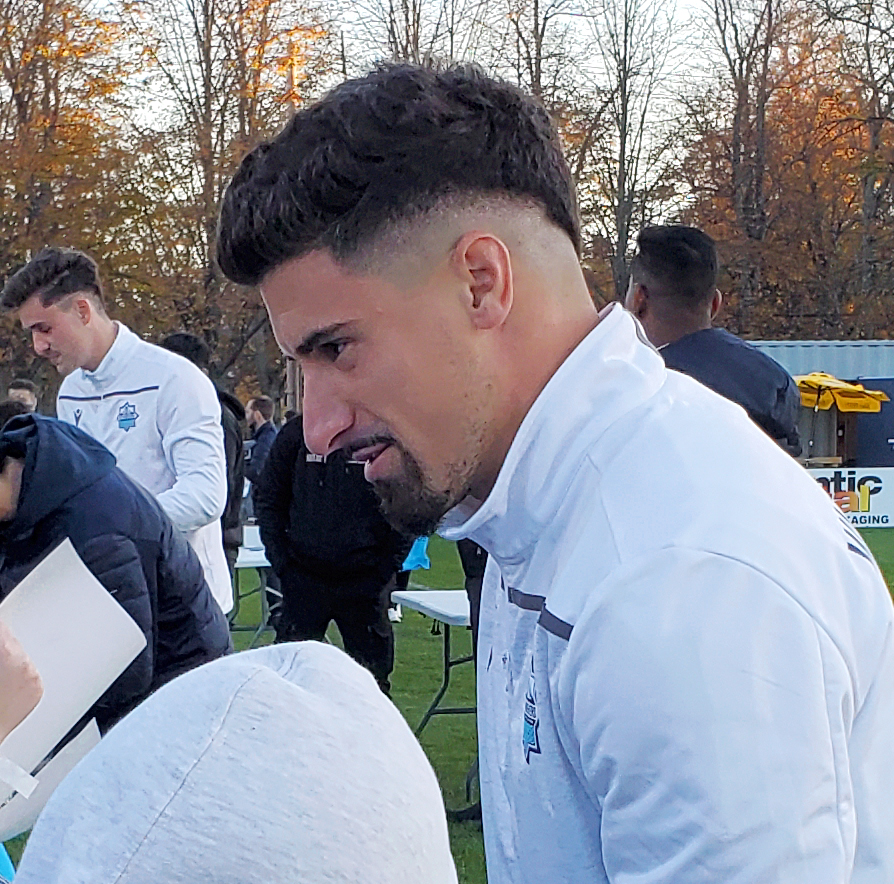
- Polisi with HFX Wanderers in 2021

Personal information
- Date of birth: January 24, 1997 (age 29)
- Place of birth: Burnaby, British Columbia, Canada
- Height: 1.78 m (5 ft 10 in)
- Position: Midfielder

Team information
- Current team: Vancouver FC

Youth career
- 2001–2011: Coquitlam Metro-Ford
- 2011–2016: Vancouver Whitecaps

College career
Years	Team	Apps	(Gls)
2016–2019	Simon Fraser Clan	51	(6)

Senior career*
Years	Team	Apps	(Gls)
2017–2019	TSS FC Rovers	22	(0)
2021–2022	HFX Wanderers FC	32	(0)
2023–2024	Valour FC	22	(1)
2025	Detroit City FC	8	(0)
2026–	Vancouver FC	24	(0)

International career^{‡}
2012	Canada U15	3	(0)
- * Club domestic league appearances and goals as of October 27, 2026 ‡ National team caps and goals as of July 11, 2021

Marcello Polisi (born January 24, 1997) is a Canadian soccer player who currently plays for Canadian Premier League side Vancouver FC.

== Early life ==
Born in Burnaby, British Columbia, Polisi grew up in nearby Coquitlam. He began playing soccer at age four with Coquitlam Metro-Ford SC, from 2001 to 2011. In 2008 and 2009, he had training stints with the youth teams of Belgian club Standard Liège. In 2011, he joined the Vancouver Whitecaps Academy, after having previously been part of the Whitecaps Prospects program, which he captained the U11 and U12 levels and appeared with the U11 squad in Europe against European club academy teams. He also played on the British Columbia provincial team, serving as U13 captain and as a member of their U14 team and also trained in the Canadian Soccer Association’s National Training Centre program at U13 level. While with the Whitecaps Academy, he often served as captain at the various age levels. In 2015, he helped his high school win the AAA provincial championship.

== University career ==
In August 2016, he committed to attend Simon Fraser University, where he would play for the men's soccer team. In his second game of his first season, he suffered an ankle injury against Seattle Pacific Falcons, which ended his season. He scored his first goal on August 31, 2017, against the University of Mary Marauders. In 2017, he was named Great Northwest Athletic Conference Player of the Year and a GNAC First-Team All-Star. He was also named an NCAA D2 All-American in 2017. In 2019, he was named to a GNAC First Team All-Star for the third consecutive year and was named to the All-West Region Second Team. His 2020 season was cancelled due to the COVID-19 pandemic. Over his time with Simon Fraser, he scored six goals and added seven assists in 51 appearances. He declared for the 2021 MLS SuperDraft, but was ultimately not selected.

== Club career ==
In 2017, Polisi joined USL PDL club TSS FC Rovers, and played for the club through the 2019 season.

In June 2021, Polisi turned professional, joining Canadian Premier League side HFX Wanderers on a one-year contract, with an option for a further year. He made his debut for the Wanderers on July 3 against Cavalry FC. In January 2022, the Wanderers announced they had exercised Polisi's contract option for the 2022 season. After the conclusion of the 2022 season, HFX announced Polisi would be departing the club.

In January 2023, Polisi signed with Valour FC. He missed the entire 2024 season due to injury.

In January 2025, Polisi signed with Detroit City FC in the USL Championship.

In January 2026, he signed a one-year contract, with an option for 2027 with Vancouver FC of the Canadian Premier League.

== International career ==
In June 2009, Polisi was captain and Most Valuable Player with the Western Canada team at the Danone Nations Cup. He was then selected to represent Canada at the 2010 Danone Nations Cup.

Polisi was called up to the Canadian National U-15 Team for the Copa Mexico de Naciones Sub-15, a boys' U-15 tournament in Ciudad de Mexico from June 16 to 25.

== Personal life ==
He is the older brother of Matteo Polisi, who is also a professional soccer player.

== Career statistics ==
As of October 19, 2025

Club	Season	League			Playoffs		Domestic Cup		Continental		Total	
Club	Season	Division	Apps	Goals	Apps	Goals	Apps	Goals	Apps	Goals	Apps	Goals
TSS FC Rovers	2017	Premier Development League	5	0	–		–		–		5	0
TSS FC Rovers	2018	Premier Development League	14	0	–		–		–		14	2
TSS FC Rovers	2019	USL League Two	3	0	–		–		–		3	0
TSS FC Rovers	Total		22	0	0	0	0	0	0	0	22	0
HFX Wanderers FC	2021	Canadian Premier League	15	0	–		2	0	–		17	0
HFX Wanderers FC	2022	Canadian Premier League	17	0	–		2	0	–		19	0
HFX Wanderers FC	Total		32	0	0	0	4	0	0	0	36	0
Valour FC	2023	Canadian Premier League	22	1	–		0	0	–		22	1
Valour FC	2024	Canadian Premier League	0	0	–		0	0	–		0	0
Valour FC	Total		22	1	0	0	0	0	0	0	22	1
Detroit City	2025	USL Championship	8	0	0	0	2	0	0	0	10	0
Career total			84	1	0	0	6	0	0	0	90	1
