= Paris Gee =

Canadian soccer player (born 1994)

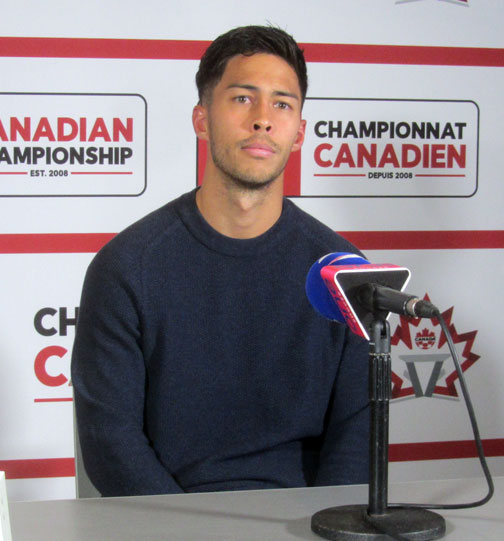
- Gee in 2023

Personal information
- Full name: Paris Donald Gee
- Date of birth: July 5, 1994 (age 32)
- Place of birth: Burnaby, British Columbia, Canada
- Height: 1.80 m (5 ft 11 in)
- Positions: Midfielder; defender

Team information
- Current team: Vancouver FC

Youth career
- Burnaby Selects SC
- Mountain United FC
- Coquitlam Metro-Ford SC
- Vancouver Whitecaps FC

College career
| Years | Team | Apps | (Gls) |
| 2012 | Simon Fraser Clan | 0 | (0) |

Senior career*
| Years | Team | Apps | (Gls) |
| 2014–2016 | Rudeš | 35 | (0) |
| 2017–2018 | Tulsa Roughnecks | 52 | (3) |
| 2019–2020 | Saint Louis FC | 35 | (0) |
| 2021 | FC Edmonton | 27 | (0) |
| 2022–2023 | York United | 33 | (0) |
| 2024– | Vancouver FC | 66 | (2) |
- * Club domestic league appearances and goals as of October 27, 2026

Paris Donald Gee (born July 5, 1994) is a Canadian professional soccer player who plays as a defender for Vancouver FC in the Canadian Premier League.

== Early life ==
Gee played youth soccer with Burnaby Selects SC and was named to the U16 British Columbia provincial team in 2010. He later played with Mountain United FC and Coquitlam Metro-Ford SC. and the Vancouver Whitecaps Academy. He also played with Croatia SC Vancouver at senior adult amateur level, helping them win the BC Provincial Cup in 2014.

== University career ==
In 2012, Gee began attending Simon Fraser University and joined the men's soccer team. However, he redshirted the season and did not play.

== Club career ==
In July 2014, Gee began his professional career in Croatia with NK Rudeš in the Croatian second tier.

In March 2017, Gee signed with United Soccer League club Tulsa Roughnecks. He made his debut on March 25, 2017 as a 74th-minute substitute in a 4–1 win over Colorado Springs Switchbacks, however, it was later ruled that Gee had been ineligible to play in the match, as his signing had not been officially processed by the league, resulting in the league overturning the match, resulting in a 3–0 forfeit loss for Tulsa. He scored his first goal for the club on October 21, 2017, in Tulsa's first ever playoff game, in a 2–1 defeat to San Antonio FC. After the season, Gee would re-sign with the club for the 2018 season.

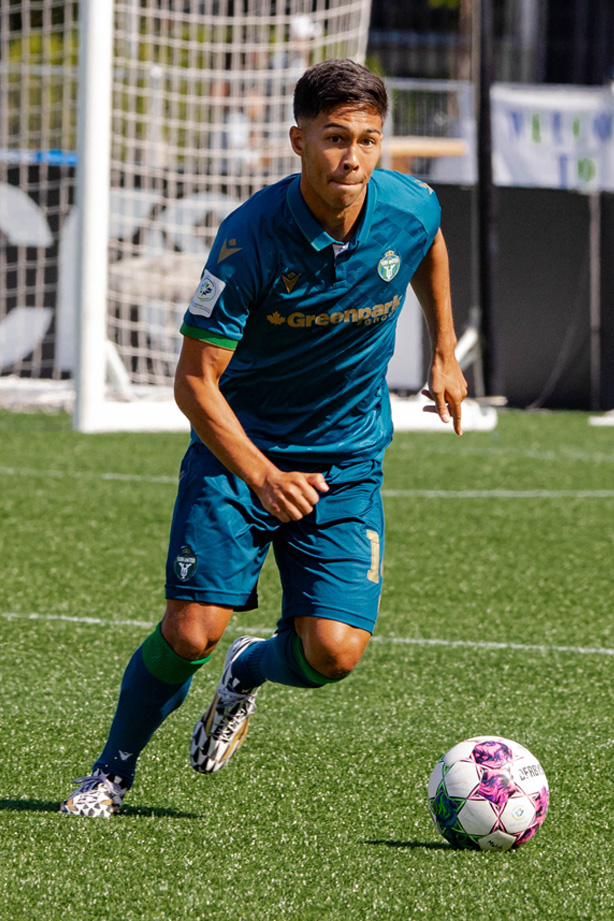
Paris Gee playing for York United in 2022

Gee joined Saint Louis FC in the USL Championship on December 29, 2018, ahead of their 2019 season. Gee would return to the club for a second season in 2020. With St. Louis City SC starting play in MLS in 2023, Saint Louis FC would fold at the end of the 2020 season, ending Gee's time at the club after two seasons.

In December 2020, Gee signed with FC Edmonton of the Canadian Premier League for the 2021 season. He made his debut in the season opener on June 26 against Atlético Ottawa.

In July 2022, he signed with York United of the Canadian Premier League for the remainder of the 2022 season. In December 2022, he re-signed with the club for the 2023 season, with a club option for 2024. In December 2023, he departed the club.

In January 2024, he signed with Vancouver FC. On April 14, 2024, he scored the winning goal in his debut, in a 4–1 victory over Valour FC. The performance earned him CPL Player of the Week honours. He was later awarded the CPL Goal of the Month honour for April 2024. In December 2025, he signed a two-year extension with the club.
