= Mohamed Amissi =

Belgian-Burundian footballer (born 2000)

Personal information
- Date of birth: 3 August 2000 (age 26)
- Place of birth: Brussels, Belgium
- Height: 1.79 m (5 ft 10 in)
- Position: Winger

Team information
- Current team: Vancouver FC
- Number: 10

Youth career
- Beerschot
- –2014: Anderlecht
- 2014–2019: NAC Breda
- 2019–2020: Heracles Almelo

Senior career*
Years	Team	Apps	(Gls)
2020–2022	Heracles Almelo	10	(0)
2022–2023	Roda JC Kerkrade	12	(0)
2023	União de Leiria	5	(0)
2023–2024	Baladiyat El Mahalla	21	(0)
2024–2025	Modern Sport	13	(0)
2026–	Vancouver FC	23	(7)

International career^{‡}
2019	Burundi U20	2	(0)
2019–	Burundi	27	(0)
- * Club domestic league appearances and goals as of 27 October 2026 ‡ National team caps and goals as of 1 August 2026

Mohamed Amissi (born 3 August 2000) is a professional footballer who plays as a winger for Vancouver FC in the Canadian Premier League. Born in Belgium, he plays for the Burundi national team.

== Club career ==
On 13 August 2019, Amissi signed a two-year contract with an option for one further season with Heracles Almelo.

On 31 January 2022, Amissi moved to Roda on a 1.5-year contract. On 18 January 2023, Amissi's contract with Roda was terminated by mutual consent.

On 23 January 2023, Portugal's Liga 3 side União de Leiria announced the signing of Amissi on a two-and-a-half-year contract. On 6 August 2023, after making just 5 appearances for the club, Leiria announced that Amissi's contract had been terminated by mutual agreement. Later that month, he moved to Egypt to play for Baladiyat El Mahalla, followed by Modern Sport a year later.

In January 2026, he signed with Vancouver FC in the Canadian Premier League.

== International career ==
He made his Burundi national team debut on 11 June 2019 in a friendly against Algeria, as a 58th-minute substitute for Hussein Shabani. He had not played on the senior level in club football at that point.

Amissi played for the national team in the 2019 Africa Cup of Nations, the first continental tournament in their history.

== Career statistics ==
=== International ===
As of match played 10 June 2025

Appearances and goals by national team and year
National team	Year	Apps	Goals
Burundi	2019	9	0
Burundi	2020	1	0
Burundi	2021	3	0
Burundi	2022	5	0
Burundi	2023	1	0
Burundi	2024	4	0
Burundi	2025	4	0
Total		27	0
