= Thierno Bah (soccer, born 2004) =

Canadian soccer player (born 2004)

- Bah in 2026

Personal information
- Full name: Thierno Maadiou Bah
- Date of birth: July 30, 2004 (age 22)
- Place of birth: Ottawa, Ontario, Canada
- Height: 1.70 m (5 ft 7 in)
- Position: Defender

Team information
- Current team: Vancouver FC
- Number: 24

Youth career
- 2013–2020: Ottawa St. Anthony SC
- 2020–2021: Vancouver Whitecaps FC

Senior career*
Years	Team	Apps	(Gls)
2022–2023	Whitecaps FC 2	45	(1)
2024–	Vancouver FC	68	(8)
- * Club domestic league appearances and goals as of October 27, 2026

Thierno Maadiou Bah (born July 30, 2004), also known as Elage Bah, is a Canadian soccer player who plays for Vancouver FC in the Canadian Premier League.

== Early life ==
Bah was born in Ottawa, Ontario. He began playing youth soccer at age nine with Ottawa St. Anthony SC. In August 2020, he joined the Vancouver Whitecaps FC Academy. In 2021, he regularly played with the Vancouver Whitecaps FC U-23.

== Club career ==
In March 2022, Bah signed a professional contract with Whitecaps FC 2 in MLS Next Pro. On June 5, 2022, he scored his first professional goal in a 4–0 victory over the Real Monarchs.

In February 2024, he signed a two-year contract with an option for 2026 with Vancouver FC of the Canadian Premier League. He made his debut on May 3 against Cavalry FC. On June 27, 2024, he scored his first CPL goal, netting the winner in a 2-1 victory over Pacific FC.

== International career ==
In May 2022, he was named to the 60-man provisional roster for the Canada U20 team ahead of the 2022 CONCACAF U-20 Championship, although he was not named to the final squad.

== Personal life ==
During the 2025 season, Bah wrote a series of articles for the Langley Advance Times called Player's Diary about his season with Vancouver FC beginning in September (taking over from T.J. Tahid who began the article series).

== Career statistics ==
As of match played October 22, 2025

Club	Season	League			Playoffs		Domestic Cup		Continental		Total	
Club	Season	Division	Apps	Goals	Apps	Goals	Apps	Goals	Apps	Goals	Apps	Goals
Whitecaps FC 2	2022	MLS Next Pro	19	1	–		–		–		19	1
Whitecaps FC 2	2023	MLS Next Pro	26	0	–		–		–		26	0
Whitecaps FC 2	Total		45	1	0	0	0	0	0	0	45	1
Vancouver FC	2024	Canadian Premier League	14	2	–		0	0	–		14	2
Vancouver FC	2025	Canadian Premier League	27	2	–		6	1	–		33	3
Vancouver FC	Total		41	4	0	0	6	1	0	0	47	5
Career total			86	5	0	0	6	1	0	0	92	6
