= Luis Toomey =

New Zealand footballer (born 2001)

Personal information
- Full name: Luis Noel Toomey
- Date of birth: 1 July 2001 (age 25)
- Place of birth: Napier, New Zealand
- Height: 1.84 m (6 ft 0 in)
- Position: Attacking midfielder

Team information
- Current team: Vancouver FC

Youth career
- 2004–2018: Napier Marist

Senior career*
Years	Team	Apps	(Gls)
2018–2019	Hawke's Bay United	9	(0)
2019–2022	Wellington Phoenix Reserves	49	(17)
2021	→ Lower Hutt City		(11)
2022	→ Wellington Phoenix FC	0	(0)
2022	Pallo-Iirot	6	(6)
2023–2024	Eastern Suburbs AFC	26	(13)
2024–2025	Auckland FC	8	(0)
2026–	Vancouver FC	21	(3)

International career^{‡}
2023	New Zealand U23	2	(1)
- * Club domestic league appearances and goals as of 27 October 2026 ‡ National team caps and goals as of 2 November 2024

Luis Noel Toomey (born 1 July 2001) is a New Zealand professional footballer who plays as an attacking midfielder for Canadian Premier League club Vancouver FC.

== Early life ==
Toomey began playing youth football with Napier Marist FC at age three.

== Club career ==
In 2018, Toomey played with Hawke's Bay United FC in the New Zealand Football Championship.

In late 2019, he joined the Wellington Phoenix Reserves in the New Zealand Football Championship. In 2021, he played the first half of the season with Wellington Phoenix affiliate Lower Hutt City AFC in the Central League, a qualifying league for the new National League, before joining the Phoenix Reserves for the National League Championship Series (the Phoenix Reserves did not participate in the qualifying season in 2021, and Lower Hutt City could not participate in the Championship Series as an affiliate). At the end of 2021, he was named to the New Zealand National League Team of the Season. In April 2022, he was called up to the Wellington Phoenix first team in the A-League for a match.

In September 2022, he signed with Finnish club Pallo-Iirot in the fourth tier Kolmonen.

In 2023, he joined Eastern Suburbs AFC in the New Zealand Northern League.

In June 2024, Toomey signed with Auckland FC in the A-League on a scholarship contract, ahead of the club's inaugural season. On 2 November 2024, Toomey made his debut, in a match against former club Wellington Phoenix, recording an assist in a 2–0 victory. In July 2025, he departed the club, upon the expiry of his contract.

In January 2026, he signed with Canadian Premier League club Vancouver FC.

== International career ==
On 16 August 2023, Toomey was named in the New Zealand U23 for the 2023 OFC Men's Olympic Qualifying Tournament. He scored in the first match on 30 August 2023, in a 3-1 victory over Fiji U23. In July 2024, Toomey was named as a non-travelling reserve for the Olympic team. However, he was later named an alternate for the side.

== Honours ==
Auckland FC

- A-League Premiership: 2024-25

Individual

- New Zealand National League Team of the Season: 2021
