= Vancouver FC =

Canadian professional soccer team

- Full name: Vancouver Football Club
- Nickname: The Eagles
- Short name: VanFC, VFC
- Founded: November 2, 2022; 4 years ago
- Stadium: Willoughby Stadium, Langley, British Columbia
- Capacity: 6,042
- Owner: SixFive Sports & Entertainment
- President: Rob Friend
- Coach: Martin Nash
- League: Canadian Premier League
- 2026: Regular season: 5th Playoffs: Did not qualify
- Website: vancouverfc.canpl.ca
Home colours	Away colours

Vancouver Football Club is a Canadian professional soccer club that competes in the Canadian Premier League, the top tier of the Canadian soccer league system. The club is based in Langley, British Columbia and plays their home matches at Willoughby Stadium.

== History ==
On November 10, 2021, the Canadian Premier League announced that it had awarded an expansion club in Vancouver to SixFive Sports and Entertainment LP. More details were announced on April 13, 2022, when the CPL and SixFive announced that the new club would play in Langley, British Columbia, at Willoughby Stadium, adjacent to the Langley Events Centre.

On November 2, 2022, the club held its official launch event where it announced its name; revealed its branding; and presented Afshin Ghotbi as the club's first head coach. The CPL announced that the club would begin league play for the 2023 season.

In March 2023, Eugene Martínez was called up to the Belize national team for 2022–23 CONCACAF Nations League B matches against Guatemala and the Dominican Republic. In the process he became the first Vancouver FC player to be called for international duty as a member of the club.

=== First seasons ===
Vancouver FC played its first league match on April 15, 2023, away to provincial rivals Pacific FC. The match ended in a 1–0 victory for Pacific with Manny Aparicio becoming the first-ever goalscorer against Vancouver. On matchday two, Vancouver defeated York United FC 2–1 for the club's inaugural victory. Shaan Hundal scored the first-ever goal for the club, while Gael Sandoval scored the eventual game-winner.

The club faced Cavalry FC in its first home match at the newly-constructed Willoughby Stadium at Langley Events Centre in front of a sell-out crowd of over 6,000 fans on May 7, 2023. Despite playing a man-down for over an hour after a red card was shown to Rocco Romeo, the club managed a 1–1 draw. First-ever Vancouver FC scorer Shaan Hundal scored the equalizing goal which was also the first home goal in club history.

Vancouver participated in the 2023 Canadian Championship for the first time but lost in the opening round to York United. The club ended their inaugural CPL season in seventh place out of eight – with a record of 8 wins, 5 draws, and 15 losses – and missed the playoffs by nine points. In 2024, Vancouver once again lost in the first round of the Canadian Championship and finished second last in the CPL. Vancouver started the season strong and sat in 2nd place at the end of June but then won only two of their final sixteen matches to fall out of playoff contention.

On July 23, 2025, Vancouver FC relieved manager Afshin Ghotbi of his duties. Despite still being active in the semifinals of the 2025 Canadian Championship at the time of the coaching change, the club sat in last place in the CPL with only 8 points through 15 matches played. Over Ghotbi's two-and-a-half year tenure, the club held a combined 16–22–38 record. Under interim manager Martin Nash, the team earned 13 points in their final 13 games but still finished the season in last place in the CPL. The team did reach the finals of the Canadian Championship where they were defeated by their crosstown rivals Vancouver Whitecaps FC by a score of 4–2. Despite the loss in the final and their regular season record, Vancouver FC qualified for the 2026 CONCACAF Champions Cup.

In December 2025, former head coach Afshin Ghotbi filed a civil claim against Vancouver FC's ownership group, SixFive Sports & Entertainment, alleging the club failed to repay a $500,000 loan he provided in July 2023 to assist with the team's cash flow. After Ghotbi's departure as head coach in July 2025, he sought repayment of the principal plus accrued interest, by then totalling over $700,000, and is seeking damages for breach of contract and misrepresentation. The defendants have disputed the allegations and stated they will contest the claim through the legal process. The lawsuit was publicly reported by CBC News and other outlets in late 2025.

== Crest and colours ==
The primary crest is a stylized eagle in the shape of the letter V. The club colours are black, grey, and red (branded as charcoal black, silver, warm red, dark grey, and cinder).

=== Kit history ===
Home and away kits.

- Home

2023	2024	2025	2026

- Away

2023	2024	2025	2026

=== Sponsorship ===
Period	Kit manufacturer	Shirt partner (chest)	Shirt partner (sleeve)
2023–2024	Macron	CIBC, Carlsberg	
2025	Macron	Cafe Artigiano	
2026–present	Hummel	Cafe Artigiano	Moneris

== Stadium ==
Vancouver FC play in a new stadium at Willoughby Stadium at Langley Events Centre. It has a capacity of 6,137 seats in its initial configuration, with potential for further expansion. The construction operations began in February 2023 and involved the usage of modular prefabricated elements.

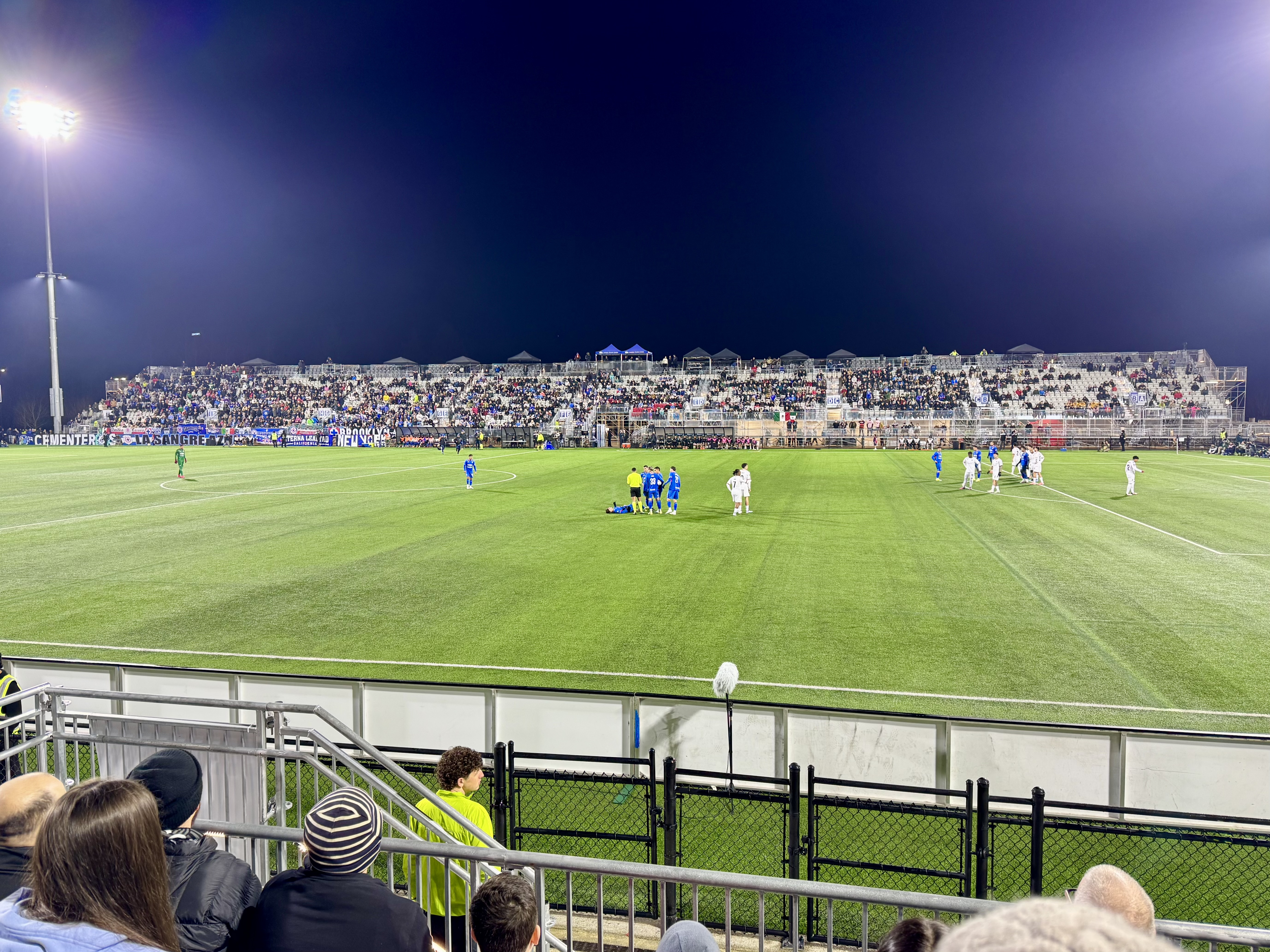
Willoughby Community Park during a CONCACAF Champions Cup match between Vancouver FC and Cruz Azul in 2026

== Players and staff ==
=== Roster ===
As of September 11, 2026

Note: Flags indicate national team as defined under FIFA eligibility rules; some limited exceptions apply. Players may hold more than one non-FIFA nationality.

No.	Pos.	Nation	Player
1	GK	CAN	Callum Irving (captain)
2	DF	CAN	Paris Gee
3	DF	CAN	Morey Doner
4	DF	SWE	Isak Ssewankambo
5	DF	CAN	Matteo Campagna
6	MF	CAN	Damiano Pecile
7	DF	CAN	Thierno Bah
8	MF	NZL	Luis Toomey
9	FW	FRA	Lys Mousset
10	FW	BDI	Mohamed Amissi
11	FW	CIV	Aboubacar Traore
14	FW	CAN	Terran Campbell

No.	Pos.	Nation	Player
15	MF	FRA	Abdoulaye Ouattara
16	MF	CAN	Benjamin Lee
18	MF	CAN	Thomas Powell
19	FW	CAN	Marsel Bibishkov
20	MF	URU	Nicolás Mezquida
21	MF	CAN	Marcello Polisi
23	FW	CAN	Kian Proctor
24	FW	USA	Henri Godbout
29	MF	BRA	Victor Lucas De Araujo
30	DF	IRL	Tom Field
33	GK	CAN	Henrik Regiting
34	GK	CAN	Matheus de Souza

=== Out on loan ===
As of February 12, 2026

Note: Flags indicate national team as defined under FIFA eligibility rules; some limited exceptions apply. Players may hold more than one non-FIFA nationality.

No.	Pos.	Nation	Player
16	MF	BRA	Michel da Silva (at Palmeiras U20 until January 26, 2027)

=== Staff ===
As of July 22, 2025

Executive
President	(Canada) Rob Friend
Coaching staff
Head coach	(Canada) Martin Nash
Assistant coach	(Denmark) Philip Lund
Assistant coach	(Canada) Azad Palani
Goalkeeping coach	(Canada) Niko Giantsopoulos

=== Head coaches ===
As of October 18, 2025

Coach	Nation	Tenure	Record				
Coach	Nation	Tenure	G	W	D	L	Win %
Afshin Ghotbi	Iran	November 2, 2022 – July 23, 2025	76	16	22	38	21.05
Martin Nash (interim)	Canada	July 23, 2025 – January 14, 2026	16	4	4	8	25.00
Martin Nash	Canada	January 14, 2026 – present	33	11	7	15	33.33

=== Club captains ===
Years	Name	Nation
2023–2026	Callum Irving	Canada

== Records ==
=== Year-by-year ===
Season	League												Playoffs	CC	Continental	Top goalscorer(s)	
Season	Div	League	Pld	W	D	L	GF	GA	GD	Pts	PPG	Pos.	Playoffs	CC	Continental	Name	Goals
2023	1	CPL	28	8	5	15	28	50	-22	29	1.04	7th	DNQ	R1	Ineligible	(Lebanon) Gabriel Bitar (Canada) Shaan Hundal	6
2024	1	CPL	28	7	9	12	29	43	-14	30	1.07	7th	DNQ	R1	DNQ	(Mexico) Alejandro Díaz	10
2025	1	CPL	28	4	9	15	35	57	-22	21	0.75	8th	DNQ	RU	DNQ	(Senegal) Ndiaye Pathé (Canada) Hugo Mbongue	6
2026	1	CPL	28	10	7	11	39	37	2	37	1.32	5th	DNQ	QF	R1	(Burundi) Mohamed Amissi (Canada) Terran Campbell	7

=== International competition ===
The following is a list of results for Vancouver FC in international competitions. Vancouver FC's scores are listed first.

Year	Tournament	Round	Opponent	Home	Away	Agg.
2026	CONCACAF Champions Cup	Round One	(Mexico) Cruz Azul	0–3	0–5	0–8

=== All-time top scorers ===
As of October 25, 2026

#	Name	Nation	Career at club	Goals			
#	Name	Nation	Career at club	CPL	Cup	Int'l	Total
1	Alejandro Díaz	Mexico	2023–2025	13	1	0	14
2	**Nicolás Mezquida**	Uruguay	2025–present	6	5	0	11
3	Gabriel Bitar	Lebanon	2023–2024	10	0	0	10
3	**Terran Campbell**	Canada	2025–present	10	0	0	10
5	**Thierno Bah**	Canada	2024–present	8	1	0	9
6	**Mohamed Amissi**	Burundi	2026–present	7	0	0	7
6	Hugo Mbongue	Canada	2025	6	1	0	7
8	Shaan Hundal	Canada	2023	6	0	0	6
8	Ndiaye Pathé	Senegal	2025	6	0	0	6
10	Mikaël Cantave	Haiti	2023–2025	5	0	0	5
10	Vasco Fry	Peru	2023–2025	5	0	0	5
10	**Lys Mousset**	France	2026-present	5	0	0	5

Note: Bold indicates active player

=== All-time top assists ===
As of October 25, 2026

#	Name	Nation	Career at club	Assists			
#	Name	Nation	Career at club	CPL	Cup	Int'l	Total
1	**Thierno Bah**	Canada	2024–present	11	3	0	14
2	Gabriel Bitar	Lebanon	2023–2024	6	0	0	6
3	Mikaël Cantave	Haiti	2023–2025	5	0	0	5
4	Vasco Fry	Peru	2023–2025	4	0	0	4
4	**Paris Gee**	Canada	2024–present	4	0	0	4
4	**Nicolás Mezquida**	Uruguay	2025–present	3	1	0	4
4	**Damiano Pecile**	Canada	2026–present	3	1	0	4
8	**Terran Campbell**	Canada	2025–present	3	0	0	3
8	Kadin Chung	Canada	2023–2024	3	0	0	3
8	Alejandro Díaz	Mexico	2023–2025	3	0	0	3
8	Gael Sandoval	Mexico	2023	3	0	0	3

Note: Bold indicates active player

=== All-time most appearances ===
As of November 13, 2026

#	Name	Nation	Career at club	Games played			
#	Name	Nation	Career at club	CPL	Cup	Int'l	Total
1	Callum Irving	Canada	2023–2026	107	11	2	120
2	**Thierno Bah**	Canada	2024–present	68	9	2	79
3	**Matteo Campagna**	Canada	2024–present	66	9	2	77
4	**Paris Gee**	Canada	2024–present	66	7	2	75
5	Vasco Fry	Peru	2023–2025	56	7	0	63
6	**Terran Campbell**	Canada	2025–present	50	9	1	60
7	Alejandro Díaz	Mexico	2023–2025	52	3	0	55
8	**Nicolás Mezquida**	Uruguay	2025–present	44	8	2	54
9	Gabriel Bitar	Lebanon	2023–2024	51	2	0	53
10	Rocco Romeo	Canada	2023–2024	48	2	0	50
10	Allan Enyou	Uganda	2024–2025	46	4	0	50

Note: Bold indicates active player

== Awards ==
=== Canadian Premier League Awards ===
Year	Name	Award	Status				
Year	Name	Award	Status	2023	James Cameron	Best Canadian U-21 Player	Nominated
