= Willoughby Stadium at Langley Events Centre =

Soccer/rugby stadium in the Township of Langley, British Columbia, Canada

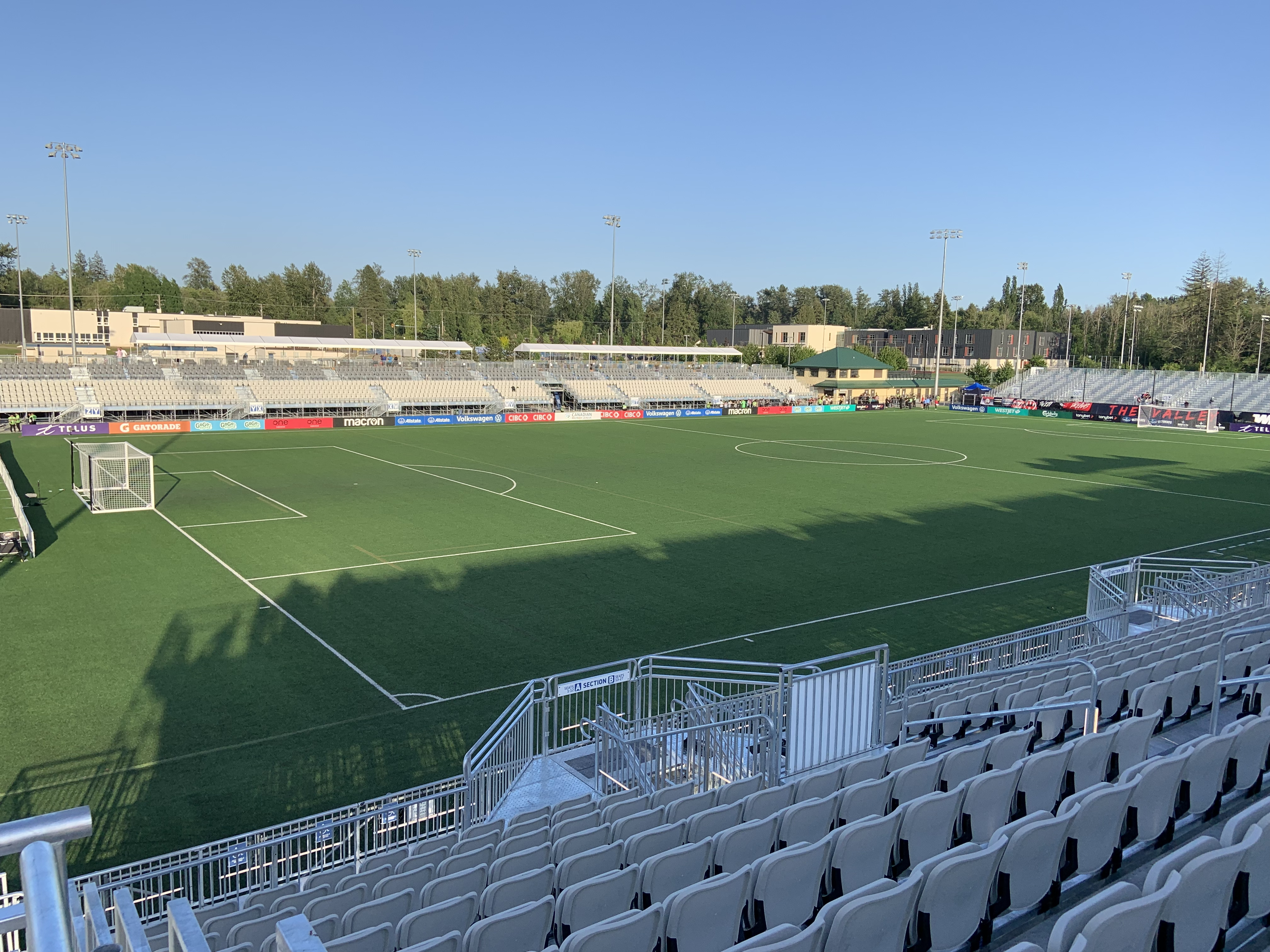
- Interactive map of Willoughby Stadium at Langley Events Centre
- Coordinates: 49.143849°N 122.665662°W
- Elevation: 75 m (246 ft)
- Operator: Ten Feet Sports and Entertainment Ltd.
- Capacity: 6,560
- Surface: Artificial turf

Construction
- Expanded: 2022–2023

Tenants
- Vancouver FC (CPL) 2023–present Trinity Western Spartans (rugby) 2023–present Langley United (BCPL) 2025–present

Website
- Langley Events Centre

Willoughby Stadium at Langley Events Centre is a soccer/rugby stadium located in the Township of Langley, British Columbia. In 2023, spectator stands were constructed around the existing turf field for the newly founded club named Vancouver FC. It is one of four sports fields in Willoughby Community Park.

The stadium hosted its first match on May 7, 2023, as Vancouver FC drew 1–1 against Calgary's Cavalry FC with an attendance of 6,177.

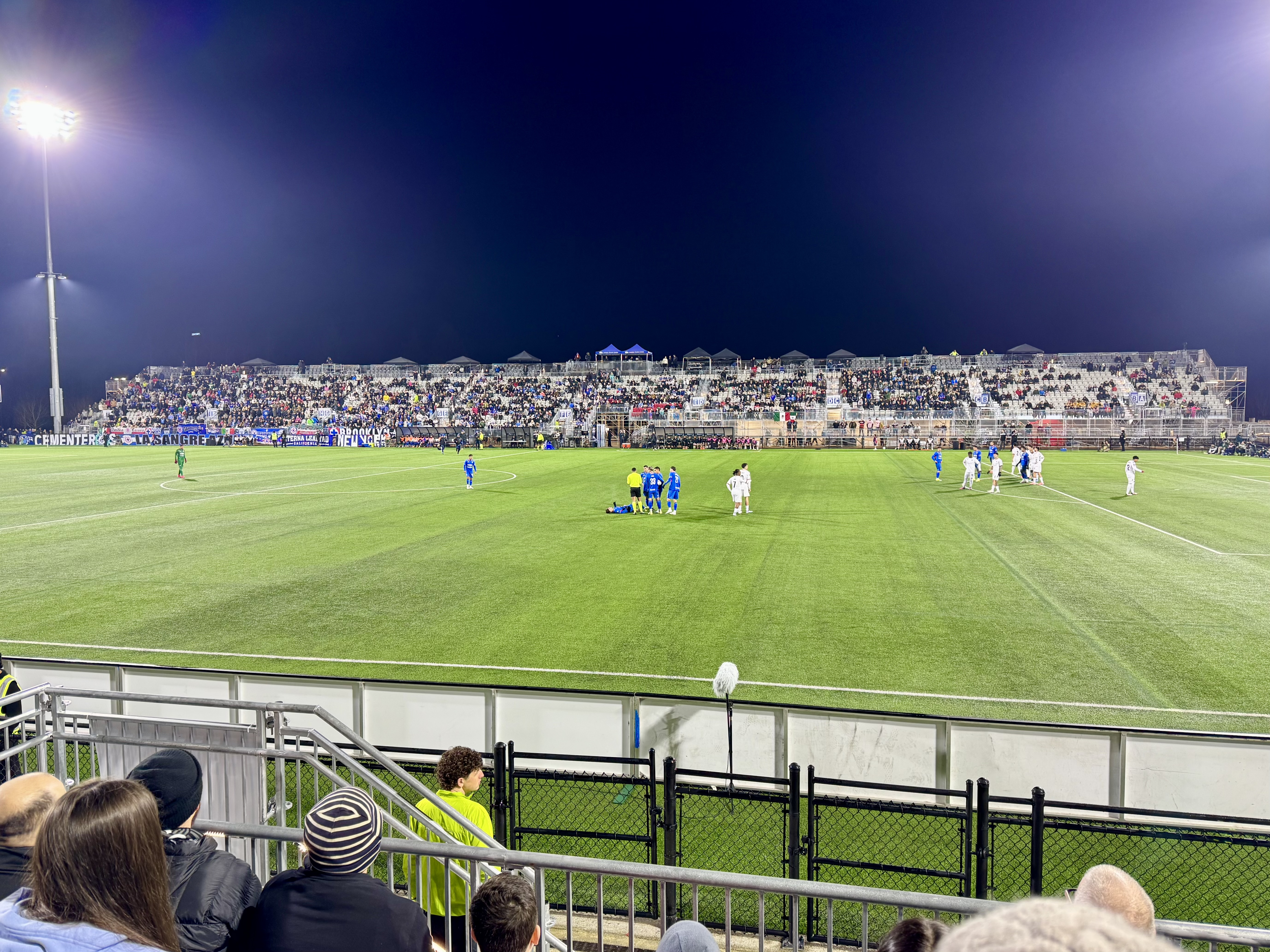
Willoughby Stadium during a CONCACAF Champions Cup match between Vancouver FC and Cruz Azul in 2026

== See also ==
- Langley Events Centre
- Percy Perry Stadium
- Swangard Stadium
