= 2025 Cavalry FC season =

Cavalry FC
2025 season
- Owner: Spruce Meadows Sports & Entertainment
- President: Ian Allison
- Head coach: Tommy Wheeldon Jr.
- Stadium: ATCO Field
- Canadian Premier League: 3rd
- CPL playoffs: Runners-up
- Canadian Championship: Quarter-finals
- CONCACAF Champions Cup: Round one
- Top goalscorer: League: Ali Musse (9); All: Tobias Warschewski (14)
- Highest home attendance: 5,114 vs. York United (June 8, CPL)
- Lowest home attendance: 2,552 vs. Edmonton Scottish (April 29, CC)
- Average home league attendance: 4,223
- Biggest win: 6–0 vs. Edmonton Scottish (Home, April 29, CC)
- Biggest defeat: 0–3 vs. Atlético Ottawa (Away, September 27, CPL)
Home colours	Away colours	Third colours

The 2025 Cavalry FC season was the seventh season in the history of Cavalry FC. In addition to the Canadian Premier League, the club competed in the Canadian Championship and the CONCACAF Champions Cup.

On February 6, Cavalry FC made history by becoming the first Canadian Premier League side to obtain a win in the CONCACAF Champions Cup, after defeating Liga MX team Pumas UNAM. The 2025 season also saw Cavalry come runner-up in the club's fourth Canadian Premier League Final appearance in the league's 7 seasons, and third appearance in a row.

== Squad ==
As of September 4, 2025

No.	Player	Nationality	Position(s)	Date of birth (age)	Previous club	Notes
Goalkeepers
1	Marco Carducci	(Canada)	GK	September 24, 1996 (aged 29)	(Canada) Calgary Foothills	
21	Joseph Holliday	(Canada)	GK	January 18, 2005 (aged 20)	(Canada) Cavalry FC U21	U21
Defenders
2	Michael Harms	(Canada)	CB / RB	December 31, 2005 (aged 20)	(Canada) Calgary Foothills	U21
3	Callum Montgomery	(Canada)	CB	May 14, 1997 (aged 28)	(United States) Minnesota United	
4	Daan Klomp	(Netherlands)	CB	August 10, 1998 (aged 27)	(Belgium) La Louvière	
5	Bradley Kamdem	(France)	LB / CB	August 18, 1994 (aged 31)	(Malta) Valletta	
12	Tom Field	(Republic of Ireland)	LB	March 14, 1997 (aged 28)	(Canada) Calgary Foothills	
15	Levi Laing	(England)	CB	April 12, 2003 (aged 22)	(England) Aldershot Town	INT
19	Mihail Gherasimencov	(Moldova)	LB	March 25, 2005 (aged 20)	(Canada) Whitecaps FC 2	U21, Loan
24	Eryk Kobza	(Canada)	CB / DM	November 23, 2001 (aged 24)	(Canada) Calgary Dinos	
33	Fraser Aird	(Canada)	RB / RW	February 2, 1995 (aged 30)	(Canada) FC Edmonton	
Midfielders
10	Sergio Camargo	(Canada)	AM	August 16, 1994 (aged 31)	(Canada) Calgary Foothills	
18	Maël Henry	(Canada)	CM	May 26, 2004 (aged 21)	(Canada) Vancouver FC	U21
26	Shamit Shome	(Bangladesh)	CM	September 5, 1997 (aged 28)	(Canada) FC Edmonton	
27	Diego Gutiérrez	(Canada)	CM / RM / RB	February 18, 1997 (aged 28)	(Canada) Valour FC	
28	Niko Myroniuk	(Canada)	CM	July 21, 2005 (aged 20)	(Canada) Mount Royal Cougars	U21
30	James McGlinchey	(Canada)	MID	May 18, 2007 (aged 18)	(Canada) Cavalry FC U21	U21, EYT
55	Michael Baldisimo	(Philippines)	DM	April 13, 2000 (aged 25)	(United States) San Jose Earthquakes	
Forwards
7	Ali Musse	(Somalia)	ST / AM	January 1, 1996 (aged 29)	(Germany) 1. FCA Darmstadt	
9	Tobias Warschewski	(Germany)	CF / RW	February 6, 1998 (aged 27)	(Canada) FC Edmonton	
14	Caniggia Elva	(Saint Lucia)	AM / ST / RW	July 14, 1996 (aged 29)	(Germany) Rot-Weiß Erfurt	
17	Nicolas Wähling	(Germany)	RW / LW	August 24, 1997 (aged 28)	(Germany) TSV Steinbach	INT
20	Goteh Ntignee	(Canada)	LW / AM / RW	May 10, 2002 (aged 23)	(France) FC Annecy	
25	Ayman Sellouf	(Netherlands)	LW / CF	August 25, 2001 (aged 24)	(Bulgaria) FC Krumovgrad	INT
Out on loan
11	Jay Herdman (at Vancouver FC)	(New Zealand)	AM / CM / CF	August 14, 2004 (aged 21)	(Canada) Whitecaps FC 2	U21

=== Staff ===
As of May 9, 2025

Executive
Owner, chairman, and CEO	(Canada) Linda Southern-Heathcott
President and COO	(Canada) Ian Allison
General manager	(England) Tommy Wheeldon Jr.
Assistant general manager	(Canada) Tofa Fakunle
Coaching staff
Head coach	(England) Tommy Wheeldon Jr.
Technical director and assistant coach	(England) Jay Wheeldon
Assistant coach	(Canada) Nik Ledgerwood
Goalkeeper coach	(Canada) David Odorico

== Transfers ==
=== In ===
No.	Pos.	Player	From club	Fee/notes	Date	Source
11	MF	(New Zealand) Jay Herdman	(Canada) Whitecaps FC 2	Free	January 14, 2025	
31	GK	(Canada) Neven Fewster	(Canada) Cavalry FC U21	Signed to a development contract	January 29, 2025	
25	MF	(Canada) Josh Belbin	(Canada) Cavalry FC U21	Short-term contract for 2025 CONCACAF Champions Cup matches	January 29, 2025	
30	MF	(Canada) James McGlinchey	(Canada) Cavalry FC U21	Signed to a development contract	January 29, 2025	
14	MF	(Saint Lucia) Caniggia Elva	(Germany) Rot-Weiß Erfurt	Free	February 3, 2025	
55	MF	(Philippines) Michael Baldisimo	(United States) San Jose Earthquakes	Free	April 2, 2025	
29	MF	(Canada) Owen Antoniuk	(Canada) Calgary Dinos	Selected 16th in the 2025 CPL–U Sports Draft, U-Sports contract	April 4, 2025	
15	DF	(England) Levi Laing	(England) Aldershot Town	Free	April 15, 2025	
22	MF	(Canada) Max Piepgrass	(Canada) CBU Capers	Signed to a U-Sports contract	April 28, 2025	
41	GK	(England) Daniel Clarke	(Canada) CBU Capers	Signed to a U-Sports contract	May 30, 2025	
34	DF	(Canada) Matas Jakubaitis	(Canada) Cavalry FC U21	Signed to a development contract	June 11, 2025	
20	FW	(Canada) Goteh Ntignee	(France) FC Annecy	Free	July 16, 2025	
25	FW	(Netherlands) Ayman Sellouf	(Bulgaria) FC Krumovgrad	Free	July 24, 2025	
4	DF	(Netherlands) Daan Klomp	(Belgium) La Louvière	Free	August 14, 2025	

==== Loans in ====
No.	Pos.	Player	Loaned from	Fee/notes	Date	Source
	DF	(Moldova) Mihail Gherasimencov	(Canada) Whitecaps FC 2	Season-long loan	March 8, 2024	

==== Draft picks ====
Cavalry FC selected the following players in the 2025 CPL–U Sports Draft. Draft picks are not automatically signed to the team roster. Only those who are signed to a contract will be listed as transfers in.

Round	Selection	Pos.	Player	Nationality	University
1	8	FW	Harvey Hughes	England	Cape Breton
2	16	FW	Owen Antoniuk	Canada	Calgary

=== Out ===
==== Transferred out ====
No.	Pos.	Player	To club	Fee/notes	Date	Source
19	FW	(South Sudan) William Akio	(Australia) Canberra Tigers	Contract terminated by mutual consent	December 6, 2024	
4	DF	(Netherlands) Daan Klomp	(Belgium) La Louvière	Contract expired	December 31, 2024	
11	MF	(New Zealand) Jay Herdman	(Canada) Whitecaps FC 2	Loan expired	December 31, 2024	
9	FW	(Trinidad and Tobago) Malcolm Shaw	(Republic of Ireland) Galway United	Option declined	December 31, 2024	
80	FW	(Canada) Lowell Wright	(Canada) TSS FC Rovers	Contract terminated by mutual consent	January 29, 2025	
6	MF	(Canada) Charlie Trafford	Retired		March 25, 2025	
25	MF	(Canada) Josh Belbin		Left club following 2025 CONCACAF Champions Cup matches	April 3, 2025	
8	MF	(Australia) Jesse Daley	(Singapore) Tanjong Pagar United	Contract terminated by mutual consent	June 11, 2025	
29	MF	(Canada) Owen Antoniuk	(Canada) Calgary Dinos	U-Sports contract expired, rights retained for 2026 season	August 15, 2025	
41	GK	(England) Daniel Clarke	(Canada) CBU Capers	U-Sports contract expired	August 15, 2025	
34	DF	(Canada) Matas Jakubaitis		Contract terminated by mutual consent	August 15, 2025	
31	GK	(Canada) Neven Fewster	(United States) UNLV Rebels	Contract terminated by mutual consent	August 15, 2025	
22	MF	(Canada) Max Piepgrass	(Canada) CBU Capers	U-Sports contract expired, rights retained for 2026 season	September 4, 2025	
23	FW	(Canada) Chanan Chanda	(Canada) Mount Royal Cougars	Contract terminated by mutual consent	September 4, 2025	

==== Loans out ====
No.	Pos.	Player	Loaned to	Fee/notes	Date	Source
11	FW	(New Zealand) Jay Herdman	(Canada) Vancouver FC	Loaned until end of season	August 8, 2025	

== Competitions ==
=== Overview ===
Competition	First match	Last match	Starting round	Final position	Record							
Competition	First match	Last match	Starting round	Final position	Pld	W	D	L	GF	GA	GD	Win %
Canadian Premier League	April 5	October 18	Matchday 1	3rd	28	11	9	8	47	36	+11	39.29
Canadian Premier League playoffs	October 26	November 9	Quarter-finals	Runners-up	3	2	0	1	6	3	+3	66.67
Canadian Championship	April 29	July 8	Preliminary round	Quarter-finals	3	1	1	1	8	0	+8	33.33
CONCACAF Champions Cup	February 6	February 13	Round one	Round one	2	1	0	1	2	3	−1	50.00
Total					36	15	10	11	63	42	+21	41.67

Source: Competitions

=== Canadian Premier League ===
==== Standings ====
Pos	Team	Pld	W	D	L	GF	GA	GD	Pts	Qualification
1	Forge (S)	28	16	10	2	51	22	+29	58	First semifinal and 2026 CONCACAF Champions Cup
2	Atlético Ottawa (C)	28	15	11	2	54	28	+26	56	First semifinal
3	Cavalry	28	11	9	8	47	36	+11	42	Quarterfinal
4	HFX Wanderers	28	11	6	11	41	34	+7	39	Play-in round
5	York United	28	10	8	10	43	38	+5	38	Play-in round
6	Valour	28	7	5	16	35	62	−27	26	
7	Pacific	28	5	8	15	30	59	−29	23	
8	Vancouver	28	4	9	15	35	57	−22	21	2026 CONCACAF Champions Cup (Note: Vancouver FC qualified for the Champions Cup as the runners-up of the 2025 Canadian Championship, due to the winners, Vancouver Whitecaps FC, qualifying through Major League Soccer.)

Source: CanPL
Rules for classification: 1) Points; 2) Total number of wins; 3) Head-to-head; 4) Goal differential; 5) Goals for; 6) Away goals differential; 7) Away goals for; 8) Home goals differential; 9) Home goals for; 10) Fewest disciplinary points; 11) Most under-21 domestic player minutes; 12) Drawing of lots.
(C) Champion (qualified to Champions Cup Round one); (S) CPL Shield winner (qualified to Champions Cup Round one)

==== Matches ====
The Canadian Premier League season began on April 5, 2025.

April 5 1	Forge FC	1–0	Cavalry FC	Hamilton, Ontario
	Bruno (yellow card) 48' (yellow-red card) 72'; Babouli 58'; Ampomah (yellow card) 90'	Report	Kamdem (yellow card) 53'	Stadium: Hamilton Stadium; Attendance: 7,963; Referee: Michael Venne

April 18 2	Cavalry FC	1–1	Vancouver FC	Foothills County, Alberta
	Shome (yellow card) 38'; Henry (yellow card) 50'; Warschewski 90+5' (pen.)	Report	Mezquida 19'; Campagna (yellow card) 21'; Norman (yellow card) 27'; Bah (yellow card) 85'	Stadium: ATCO Field; Attendance: 4,335; Referee: Ben Hoskins

April 26 3	Cavalry FC	1–3	Atlético Ottawa	Foothills County, Alberta
	Field (yellow card) 22'; Kamdem (red card) 64'; Henry (yellow card) 68'; Elva 87'; Laing (yellow card) 89'	Report	Kamdem 59' (own); Kozlovskiy (yellow card) 63'; Tabla 66'; Castro (yellow card) 80'; Coulanges 82'	Stadium: ATCO Field; Attendance: 3,763; Referee: Carly Shaw-MacLaren

May 2 4	York United FC	1–2	Cavalry FC	Toronto, Ontario
	Higgins (yellow card) 6'; Yeates (yellow card) 36'; Julian Altobelli 45+1'; Singh (yellow card) 75'; Ferrari (yellow card) 90+3'	Report	Warschewski 42'; Aird 69', (yellow card) 90+5'; Laing (yellow card) 77'	Stadium: York Lions Stadium; Attendance: 1,342; Referee: Fabrizio Stasolla

May 10 5	HFX Wanderers FC	0–3	Cavalry FC	Halifax, Nova Scotia
	Alphonse (yellow card) 75'	Report	Warschewski 45+2'; Carducci (yellow card) 82'; Musse 83', 85'; Daley (yellow card) 90+2'	Stadium: Wanderers Grounds; Attendance: 5,044; Referee: Sebastian Noshinravani

May 17 6	Cavalry FC	4–0	Pacific FC	Foothills County, Alberta
	Gherasimencov 7'; Warschewski 61' (pen.); Musse 69' (pen.); Wähling 90+5'	Report	Ndom (yellow card) 38'; Greco-Taylor (yellow card) 71' (yellow-red card) 88'; Bustos (yellow card) 83'	Stadium: ATCO Field; Attendance: 3,669; Referee: Scott Bowman

May 25 7	Cavalry FC	4–0	Valour FC	Foothills County, Alberta
	Laing 14'; Camargo 50'; Warschewski 60'; Musse 72', (yellow card) 84'; Daley (yellow card) 90+3'	Report	Layne (yellow card) 40'; Ressurreição (yellow card) 74'; Figueiredo (yellow card) 82'; Romeo (yellow card) 90+2'	Stadium: ATCO Field; Attendance: 3,654; Referee: Alain Ruch

May 31 8	Forge FC	1–1	Cavalry FC	Hamilton, Ontario
	Ampomah 17', (yellow card) 21'; Owolabi-Belewu (yellow card) 55'	Report	Camargo 2', (yellow card) 83'; Daley (yellow card) 63'	Stadium: Hamilton Stadium; Attendance: 6,578; Referee: Yusri Rudolf

June 8 9	Cavalry FC	2–1	York United FC	Foothills County, Alberta
	Camargo 2', 51'; Aird (yellow card) 35'; Field (yellow card) 45+1'; Herdman (yellow card) 90+1'	Report	Ferrari (yellow card) 9'; Kibato (yellow card) 50'; Ferrin 52'; Botello (yellow card) 53'; Adekugbe (yellow card) 78'; Zeppieri (yellow card) 85'; Umanzor (yellow card) 88'	Stadium: ATCO Field; Attendance: 5,114; Referee: Michael Venne

June 14 10	HFX Wanderers FC	1–1	Cavalry FC	Halifax, Nova Scotia
	Coimbra 8'; Telfer (yellow card) 32'; Johnston (yellow card) 78'; Sow (yellow card) 90+4'	Report	Kobza (yellow card) 39'; Elva 69'	Stadium: Wanderers Grounds; Attendance: 6,339; Referee: Ben Hoskins

June 22 11	Cavalry FC	1–0	Pacific FC	Foothills County, Alberta
	Musse 13'; Shome (yellow card) 32'; Gherasimencov (yellow card) 54'	Report	Schiavoni (yellow card) 48'; Lajeunesse (yellow card) 72'	Stadium: ATCO Field; Attendance: 3,450; Referee: Mario Al-Ayass

June 28 12	Cavalry FC	0–2	Atlético Ottawa	Foothills County, Alberta
	Laing (yellow card) 13'; Montgomery (yellow card) 38'; Gutiérrez (yellow card) 62'	Report	Santos 9'; Salter 61'; Tabla (yellow card) 87'	Stadium: ATCO Field; Attendance: 4,452; Referee: Renzo Villanueva

July 13 13	Vancouver FC	0–0	Cavalry FC	Langley, British Columbia
	Enyou (yellow card) 21'; Fry (yellow card) 27'; Norman (yellow card) 48'; Mezquida (red card) 62'	Report	Gherasimencov (yellow card) 19'; Piepgrass (yellow card) 29'; Warschewski (yellow card) 69'	Stadium: Willoughby Community Park; Attendance: 1,718; Referee: Ben Hoskins

July 20 14	Valour FC	1–2	Cavalry FC	Winnipeg, Manitoba
	Williams (yellow card) 22'; Ohin (yellow card) 59'; Himaras (on bench) (yellow card) 65'; Figueiredo 82'; Mlah (yellow card) 90+6'	Report	Laing (yellow card) 42'; Montgomery 51', (yellow card) 88'; Piepgrass (yellow card) 61'; Camargo 90+3'	Stadium: Princess Auto Stadium; Attendance: 2,961; Referee: Roberto D'Alesio

July 26 15	Cavalry FC	0–1	York United FC	Foothills County, Alberta
	Piepgrass (yellow card) 57'; Camargo (yellow card) 89'; Gutiérrez (yellow card) 90+8'; Musse (red card) 90+8'	Report	Altobelli 36'; Bitar (yellow card) 45'; Sturing (yellow card) 58'; León (yellow card) 75'; Jimoh (yellow card) 80'; Urtiaga (yellow card) 90+2'	Stadium: ATCO Field; Attendance: 4,496; Referee: Fabrizio Stasolla
Note: Musse was shown a red card following the final whistle of the match and received a 3-match suspension for violent conduct.

July 29 16	Valour FC	2–1	Cavalry FC	Winnipeg, Manitoba
	Fernandez 23'; Morgan 56'; Ohin (yellow card) 86'; Pop (yellow card) 90+6'; Facchineri (yellow card) 90+8'; Himaras (on bench) (red card) 90+10'	Report	Gutiérrez 60'; Camargo (yellow card) 70'; Ntignee (yellow card) 90+7' (yellow-red card) 90+8'	Stadium: Princess Auto Stadium; Attendance: 2,369; Referee: Amir Saman Soltani
Note: Himaras (on bench) received a 3-match suspension for violent conduct following the red card.

August 4 17	Pacific FC	1–0	Cavalry FC	Langford, British Columbia
	Heard (yellow card) 8'; Chung (yellow card) 45+4'; Young 90+2'; Browning Lagerfeldt (yellow card) 90+5'	Report	Gutiérrez (yellow card) 51'	Stadium: Starlight Stadium; Attendance: 2,918; Referee: Renzo Villanueva

August 9 18	Cavalry FC	0–0	HFX Wanderers FC	Foothills County, Alberta
	Kobza (yellow card) 36'; Baldisimo (yellow card) 38'; Camargo (yellow card) 82'	Report	Alphonse (yellow card) 13'; Callegari (yellow card) 34'; Timóteo (yellow card) 86'	Stadium: ATCO Field; Attendance: 3,988; Referee: Sebastian Noshinravani

August 17 19	Cavalry FC	5–4	Vancouver FC	Foothills County, Alberta
	Ntignee 3'; Warschewski 4'; Baldisimo 26', (yellow card) 59'; Gherasimencov 88'; Carducci (yellow card) 90+4'; Klomp 90+7'	Report	Mezquida 18' (pen.); Campbell 33'; Mbongue (yellow card) 38', (goal) 58'; Dada-Luke (yellow card) 48'; O'Connor (yellow card) 62'; Fotsing 90+5'	Stadium: ATCO Field; Attendance: 4,291; Referee: Mario Alayass

August 23 20	Atlético Ottawa	2–2	Cavalry FC	Ottawa, Ontario
	Tabla (yellow card) 56'; Salter 69'; Rodríguez 72'; Kozlovskiy (yellow card) 90+3'	Report	Musse 23', 35'; Camargo (yellow card) 29'; Klomp (yellow card) 49'; Montgomery (yellow card) 76'; Kamdem (yellow card) 84'; Aird (yellow card) 90+5'	Stadium: TD Place Stadium; Attendance: 5,248; Referee: Yusri Rudolf

August 30 21	Cavalry FC	4–1	Forge FC	Foothills County, Alberta
	Warschewski 14', 55'; Aird (yellow card) 45+1'; Gutiérrez (yellow card) 45+1'; Musse 50'; Camargo 62'; Kobza (yellow card) 90+4'	Report	Ampomah 60'; Borges (yellow card) 70'; Rama (yellow card) 90+4'	Stadium: ATCO Field; Attendance: 4,786; Referee: Alain Ruch

September 5 22	York United FC	3–1	Cavalry FC	Toronto, Ontario
	Higgins (yellow card) 6'; Reid (yellow card) 10', (goal) 40'; Singh (yellow card) 30'; López 59', (yellow card) 72'; Botello (yellow card) 70'; Ferrari 84'	Report	Klomp (yellow card) 55'; Kamdem (yellow card) 57'; Aird 87' (pen.)	Stadium: York Lions Stadium; Attendance: 1,546; Referee: Michael Venne

September 13 23	Cavalry FC	3–1	HFX Wanderers FC	Foothills County, Alberta
	Kobza 33', (yellow card) 72'; Musse 46'; Camargo 53'; Ntignee (yellow card) 69'; Kamdem (yellow card) 73'; Baldisimo (yellow card) 74'	Report	Rampersad (yellow card) 50'; Pearlman 57', (yellow card) 58'; Dunn (yellow card) 90+2'	Stadium: ATCO Field; Attendance: 4,231; Referee: Roberto D'Alesio

September 20 24	Cavalry FC	3–0	Valour FC	Foothills County, Alberta
	Kobza 3'; Ntignee 55'; Baldisimo (yellow card) 75'; Carducci (yellow card) 77'; Shome (yellow card) 84'; Elva 89'	Report	Froese (yellow card) 74'	Stadium: ATCO Field; Attendance: 4,789; Referee: Yusri Rudolf

September 27 25	Atlético Ottawa	3–0	Cavalry FC	Ottawa, Ontario
	Salter 18'; Kozlovskiy (yellow card) 55'; Tabla 72', 80'; Ortega (yellow card) 78'	Report	Musse (yellow card) 28'; Aird (yellow card) 45+2'; Kobza (yellow card) 55'; Myroniuk (yellow card) 86'; Warschewski (yellow card) 88'	Stadium: TD Place Stadium; Attendance: 4,632; Referee: Ben Hoskins

October 5 26	Pacific FC	3–3	Cavalry FC	Langford, British Columbia
	Ndom (yellow card) 17'; Young 43'; Greco-Taylor (yellow card) 45'; Chung (yellow card) 59'; Keshavarz 65'; Díaz 70'; Heard (yellow card) 90+3'	Report	Ntignee 22', 52'; Baldisimo (yellow card) 34' (yellow-red card) 61'; Klomp 90+3'	Stadium: Starlight Stadium; Attendance: 3,774; Referee: Sebastian Noshinravani

October 10 27	Cavalry FC	1–1	Forge FC	Foothills County, Alberta
	Camargo 25'; Klomp (yellow card) 27'; Laing (yellow card) 29'	Report	Choinière (yellow card) 15'; Wright 31' (pen.); Hojabrpour (yellow card) 47'; Rama (yellow card) 69'; Jevremović (yellow card) 86'	Stadium: ATCO Field; Attendance: 4,763; Referee: Alain Ruch

October 18 28	Vancouver FC	2–2	Cavalry FC	Langley, British Columbia
	Gee (yellow card) 48'; Ouattara (yellow card) 54'; Crawford (red card); Pathé 82'; Norman 90+6' (pen.)	Report	Musse (yellow card) 26'; Myroniuk 78'; Kobza (yellow card) 81'; Elva 90+1'	Stadium: Willoughby Community Park; Attendance: 1,178; Referee: Renzo Villanueva

==== Playoff matches ====
Cavalry qualified for the CPL playoffs on September 21.

In their first playoff match, Cavalry faced the winner of the play-in round in the quarter-finals. After beating York United in the quarter-finals, they would go on to face the losers of the first semi-final in a Page playoff system. As a result of this playoff system, Cavalry's only possible home game would be in the quarter-finals. After Cavalry beat first semi-final losers Forge FC in the second semi-final, Cavalry went on to face first semi-final winners Atlético Ottawa in the final.

October 26 Quarterfinal	Cavalry FC	4–1	York United FC	Foothills County, Alberta
	Musse 8'; Warschewski 17', 58'; Singh 57' (o.g.)	Report	Kibato (yellow card) 38'; Ferrari (yellow card) 43'; Hundal 44'; Costa (yellow card) 85'; Altobelli (yellow card) 89'	Stadium: ATCO Field; Attendance: 3,729; Referee: Ben Hoskins

November 2 Second semifinal	Forge FC	0–1	Cavalry FC	Hamilton, Ontario
	Owolabi-Belewu (yellow card) 44'; Hojabrpour (yellow card) 45+1'; Ampomah (yellow card) 56'; Borges (yellow card) 90+8'	Report	Kobza (yellow card) 30'; Warschewski 57'; Ntignee (yellow card) 90+3'; Gutiérrez (yellow card) 90+4'; Carducci (yellow card) 90+7'	Stadium: Hamilton Stadium; Attendance: 6,125; Referee: Yusri Rudolf

November 9 Final	Atlético Ottawa	2–1 (a.e.t.)	Cavalry FC	Ottawa, Ontario
	Rodríguez 40', 107'; Salter (yellow card) 45+8'; Sissoko (yellow card) 75'; Abatneh (yellow card) 91'; Antinoro (yellow card) 120+2'	Report	Aird 33' (pen.); Gherasimencov (yellow card) 50'; Shome (yellow card) 82'; Ntignee (yellow card) 114'; Kobza (yellow card) 116'	Stadium: TD Place Stadium; Attendance: 13,132; Referee: Michael Venne

=== Canadian Championship ===
The draw for the preliminary round and quarter-finals was held on December 12, 2024.

==== Preliminary round ====
May 6 Single leg	Cavalry FC	6–0	Edmonton Scottish	Calgary, Alberta
7:00 PM MDT	Elva 9' (yellow card) 70'; Myroniuk 18'; Wähling 61'; Musse 72'; Piepgrass 79'; Warschewski 87'	Report	Masri (yellow card) 34'	Stadium: ATCO Field; Attendance: 2,552; Referee: Yusri Rudolf

==== Quarter-finals ====
May 21 First leg	Vancouver FC	1–1	Cavalry FC	Langley, British Columbia
	O'Connor (yellow card) 21'; Bah (yellow card) 28'; Norman 41'; Fry (yellow card) 51'; Díaz (yellow card) 51'	Report	Gherasimencov (yellow card) 25'; Piepgrass (yellow card) 29'; Warschewski 84'	Stadium: Willoughby Community Park; Attendance: 1,434; Referee: Renzo Villanueva

July 8 Second leg	Cavalry FC	1–1 (2–2 agg.) (4–5 p)	Vancouver FC	Foothills County, Alberta
	Gutiérrez (yellow card) 45+1'; Shome (yellow card) 62'; O'Connor 66' (o.g.); Musse (yellow card) 72'	Report	Mezquida 23' (pen.); Fry (yellow card) 26'; O'Connor (yellow card) 32'; Godbout (yellow card) 76'	Stadium: ATCO Field; Attendance: 2,177; Referee: Michael Venne
	Penalties
	Warschewski (penalty missed); Elva (penalty scored); Gherasimencov (penalty scored); Aird (penalty scored); Musse (penalty scored); Henry (penalty missed)		(penalty scored) Mezquida; (penalty scored) Norman; (penalty scored) O'Connor; (penalty scored) Campbell; (penalty missed) Powell; (penalty scored) Batista

=== CONCACAF Champions Cup ===
The CONCACAF Champions Cup draw was held on December 10, 2024, with Cavalry drawing Liga MX side Pumas UNAM in round one. Because of potential weather issues in Calgary in February, the club announced shortly after the draw that their first round match would be played at Pacific FC's Starlight Stadium in Langford, BC.

==== Round one ====
February 6 First leg	Cavalry FC (Canada)	2–1	(Mexico) Pumas UNAM	Langford, Canada
10:00 pm	Trafford (yellow card) 5', (goal) 53'; Shome (yellow card) 39'; Warschewski 80', (yellow card) 90+1'; Aird (yellow card) 90+1'; Carducci (yellow card) 90+3'	Report	Galindo (yellow card) 1'; López 44'	Stadium: Starlight Stadium; Attendance: 3,139; Referee: Mario Escobar (Guatemala)

February 13 Second leg	Pumas UNAM (Mexico)	2–0 (3–2 agg.)	(Canada) Cavalry FC	Mexico City, Mexico
8:00 pm	Martínez 53', 74'; Monroy (yellow card) 88'	Report	Camargo (yellow card) 8'; Trafford (yellow card) 19'; Herdman (red card) 45+4'	Stadium: Estadio Olímpico Universitario; Attendance: 8,778; Referee: Juan Gabriel Calderón (Costa Rica)

== Statistics ==
As of November 9, 2025

=== Squad and statistics ===
No.	Pos	Nat	Player	Total		CPL		CPL Playoffs		Canadian Championship		Champions Cup	
No.	Pos	Nat	Player	Apps	Goals	Apps	Goals	Apps	Goals	Apps	Goals	Apps	Goals
1	GK	(Canada) CAN	Marco Carducci	35	0	28	0	3	0	2	0	2	0
21	GK	(Canada) CAN	Joseph Holliday	1	0	0	0	0	0	1	0	0	0
4	DF	(Netherlands) NED	Daan Klomp	13	2	10	2	3	0	0	0	0	0
12	DF	(Republic of Ireland) IRL	Tom Field	21	0	16	0	3	0	1	0	1	0
19	DF	(Moldova) MDA	Mihail Gherasimencov	30	2	24	2	3	0	3	0	0	0
3	DF	(Canada) CAN	Callum Montgomery	27	1	24	1	0	0	1	0	2	0
24	DF	(Canada) CAN	Eryk Kobza	25	2	19	2	3	0	1	0	2	0
5	DF	(France) FRA	Bradley Kamdem	20	0	14	0	2	0	2	0	2	0
15	DF	(England) ENG	Levi Laing	25	1	20	1	2	0	3	0	0	0
2	DF	(Canada) CAN	Michael Harms	3	0	2	0	0	0	1	0	0	0
26	MF	(Bangladesh) BAN	Shamit Shome	25	0	17	0	3	0	3	0	2	0
10	MF	(Canada) CAN	Sergio Camargo	32	8	27	8	1	0	2	0	2	0
33	DF	(Canada) CAN	Fraser Aird	36	3	28	2	3	1	3	0	2	0
55	MF	(Philippines) PHI	Michael Baldisimo	17	1	15	1	2	0	0	0	0	0
27	MF	(Canada) CAN	Diego Gutiérrez	15	1	11	1	2	0	1	0	1	0
14	FW	(Saint Lucia) LCA	Caniggia Elva	25	5	18	4	3	0	2	1	2	0
28	MF	(Canada) CAN	Niko Myroniuk	16	2	13	1	1	0	2	1	0	0
30	MF	(Canada) CAN	James McGlinchey	2	0	1	0	0	0	1	0	0	0
9	FW	(Germany) GER	Tobias Warschewski	35	14	27	8	3	3	3	2	2	1
7	FW	(Somalia) SOM	Ali Musse	31	11	23	9	3	1	3	1	2	0
17	FW	(Germany) GER	Nicolas Wähling	29	2	22	1	2	0	3	1	2	0
25	FW	(Netherlands) NED	Ayman Sellouf	16	0	14	0	2	0	0	0	0	0
20	FW	(Canada) CAN	Goteh Ntignee	16	4	13	4	3	0	0	0	0	0
18	MF	(Canada) CAN	Maël Henry	15	0	12	0	0	0	2	0	1	0
Player(s) transferred out during this season
41	GK	(England) ENG	Daniel Clarke	0	0	0	0	0	0	0	0	0	0
31	GK	(Canada) CAN	Neven Fewster	0	0	0	0	0	0	0	0	0	0
11	FW	(New Zealand) NZL	Jay Herdman	18	0	14	0	0	0	2	0	2	0
8	MF	(Australia) AUS	Jesse Daley	7	0	4	0	0	0	1	0	2	0
22	MF	(Canada) CAN	Max Piepgrass	17	1	15	0	0	0	2	1	0	0
29	MF	(Canada) CAN	Owen Antoniuk	6	0	4	0	0	0	2	0	0	0
23	FW	(Canada) CAN	Chanan Chanda	3	0	2	0	0	0	1	0	0	0
6	MF	(Canada) CAN	Charlie Trafford	2	1	0	0	0	0	0	0	2	1
25	MF	(Canada) CAN	Josh Belbin	0	0	0	0	0	0	0	0	0	0
34	DF	(Canada) CAN	Matas Jakubaitis	0	0	0	0	0	0	0	0	0	0

=== Goal scorers ===
Rank	Nat.	Player	Pos.	CPL	CPL Playoffs	Canadian Championship	Champions Cup	TOTAL
1	(Germany)	Tobias Warschewski	FW	8	3	2	1	14
2	(Somalia)	Ali Musse	FW	9	1	1	0	11
3	(Canada)	Sergio Camargo	MF	8	0	0	0	8
4	(Saint Lucia)	Caniggia Elva	FW	4	0	1	0	5
5	(Canada)	Goteh Ntignee	FW	4	0	0	0	4
6	(Canada)	Fraser Aird	DF	2	1	0	0	3
7	(Germany)	Nicolas Wähling	FW	1	0	1	0	2
7	(Moldova)	Mihail Gherasimencov	DF	2	0	0	0	2
7	(Canada)	Eryk Kobza	DF/MF	2	0	0	0	2
7	(Canada)	Niko Myroniuk	MF	1	0	1	0	2
7	(Netherlands)	Daan Klomp	DF	2	0	0	0	2
12	(England)	Levi Laing	DF	1	0	0	0	1
12	(Canada)	Callum Montgomery	DF	1	0	0	0	1
12	(Canada)	Max Piepgrass	MF	0	0	1	0	1
12	(Philippines)	Michael Baldisimo	MF	1	0	0	0	1
12	(Canada)	Diego Gutiérrez	MF	1	0	0	0	1
12	(Canada)	Charlie Trafford	MF	0	0	0	1	1
Own goals				0	1	1	0	2
Totals				47	6	8	2	63

=== Clean sheets ===
Rank	Nat.	Player	CPL	CPL Playoffs	Canadian Championship	Champions Cup	TOTAL
1	(Canada)	Marco Carducci	7	1	0	0	8
2	(Canada)	Joseph Holliday	0	0	1	0	1
3	(England)	Daniel Clarke	0	0	0	0	0
3	(Canada)	Neven Fewster	0	0	0	0	0
Totals			7	1	1	0	9

=== Disciplinary Record ===
No.	Pos.	Nat.	Player	CPL		CPL Playoffs		Canadian Championship		Champions Cup		TOTAL	
No.	Pos.	Nat.	Player	Yellow card	Red card	Yellow card	Red card	Yellow card	Red card	Yellow card	Red card	Yellow card	Red card
1	GK	(Canada)	Marco Carducci	3	0	1	0	0	0	1	0	5	0
4	DF	(Netherlands)	Daan Klomp	3	0	0	0	0	0	0	0	3	0
12	DF	(Republic of Ireland)	Tom Field	2	0	0	0	0	0	0	0	2	0
19	DF	(Moldova)	Mihail Gherasimencov	2	0	1	0	1	0	0	0	4	0
3	DF	(Canada)	Callum Montgomery	3	0	0	0	0	0	0	0	3	0
24	DF/MF	(Canada)	Eryk Kobza	6	0	2	0	0	0	0	0	8	0
5	DF	(France)	Bradley Kamdem	4	1	0	0	0	0	0	0	4	1
15	DF	(England)	Levi Laing	5	0	0	0	0	0	0	0	5	0
26	MF	(Bangladesh)	Shamit Shome	3	0	1	0	1	0	1	0	6	0
11	FW	(New Zealand)	Jay Herdman	1	0	0	0	0	0	0	1	1	1
10	MF	(Canada)	Sergio Camargo	5	0	0	0	0	0	1	0	6	0
33	DF	(Canada)	Fraser Aird	5	0	0	0	0	0	1	0	6	0
55	MF	(Philippines)	Michael Baldisimo	4	1	0	0	0	0	0	0	4	1
27	MF	(Canada)	Diego Gutiérrez	5	0	1	0	1	0	0	0	7	0
8	MF	(Australia)	Jesse Daley	3	0	0	0	0	0	0	0	3	0
14	FW	(Saint Lucia)	Caniggia Elva	0	0	0	0	1	0	0	0	1	0
28	MF	(Canada)	Niko Myroniuk	1	0	0	0	0	0	0	0	1	0
6	MF	(Canada)	Charlie Trafford	0	0	0	0	0	0	2	0	2	0
20	FW	(Canada)	Max Piepgrass	3	0	0	0	1	0	0	0	4	0
9	FW	(Germany)	Tobias Warschewski	4	0	0	0	0	0	1	0	5	0
7	FW	(Somalia)	Ali Musse	3	0	0	0	1	0	0	0	4	0
20	FW	(Canada)	Goteh Ntignee	1	1	2	0	0	0	0	0	3	1
18	MF	(Canada)	Maël Henry	2	0	0	0	0	0	0	0	2	0
Totals				68	3	8	0	6	0	7	1	89	4

== Honours ==
=== Canadian Premier League Awards ===
The 2025 Canadian Premier League Awards was held in Gatineau, Quebec, on November 7, 2025.

Nat.	Name	Award	Status
(Canada)	Marco Carducci	Golden Glove	Nominated
(Somalia)	Ali Musse	Player of the Year	Nominated

Best XI

The 2025 Canadian Premier League Best XI was announced on December 11, and was selected by the CPL's soccer department.

Pos.	Nat.	Name
MF	(Canada)	Sergio Camargo

==== Monthly awards ====
Month	Nat.	Name	Award	Source
May	(England)	Tommy Wheeldon Jr.	Manager of the Month	
May	(Canada)	Marco Carducci	Goalkeeper of the Month	
August	(Somalia)	Ali Musse	Player of the Month	
October	(England)	Tommy Wheeldon Jr. (2)	Manager of the Month	

==== Player of the week ====
Week	Nat.	Name	Source
6	(Somalia)	Ali Musse	
7	(Germany)	Tobias Warschewski	
10	(Canada)	Sergio Camargo	
19	(Somalia)	Ali Musse (2)	
21	(Germany)	Tobias Warschewski (2)	
26	(Canada)	Goteh Ntignee	

==== Team of the week ====
The Team of the Week is usually selected by the CPL's Kristian Jack and OneSoccer's Oliver Platt.

Week		Name	Source
3	(Canada)	Marco Carducci	
3	(Germany)	Tobias Warschewski	
5	(Canada)	Fraser Aird	
5	(Canada)	Sergio Camargo	
5	(Bangladesh)	Shamit Shome	
5	(Germany)	Tobias Warschewski (2)	
6	(England)	Levi Laing	
6	(Somalia)	Ali Musse	
6	(Bangladesh)	Shamit Shome (2)	
6	(Germany)	Tobias Warschewski (3)	
7	(Canada)	Callum Montgomery	
7	(Canada)	Fraser Aird (2)	
7	(Somalia)	Ali Musse (2)	
7	(Germany)	Tobias Warschewski (4)	
8	(Canada)	Marco Carducci (2)	
8	(Canada)	Sergio Camargo (2)	
8	(Somalia)	Ali Musse (3)	
8	(Germany)	Tobias Warschewski (5)	
9	(Canada)	Marco Carducci (3)	
10	(Canada)	Callum Montgomery (2)	
10	(Canada)	Sergio Camargo (3)	
10	(New Zealand)	Jay Herdman	
12	(Moldova)	Mihail Gherasimencov	
12	(Canada)	Sergio Camargo (4)	
12	(Somalia)	Ali Musse (4)	
15	(Canada)	Fraser Aird (3)	
18	(Canada)	Marco Carducci (4)	
19	(Netherlands)	Daan Klomp	
19	(Somalia)	Ali Musse (5)	
20	(Somalia)	Ali Musse (6)	
21	(Netherlands)	Daan Klomp (2)	
21	(Canada)	Sergio Camargo (5)	
21	(Germany)	Tobias Warschewski (6)	
23	(Canada)	Goteh Ntignee	
23	(Somalia)	Ali Musse (7)	
23	(Canada)	Eryk Kobza	
24	(Canada)	Marco Carducci (5)	
24	(Canada)	Goteh Ntignee (2)	
24	(Canada)	Eryk Kobza (2)	
26	(Canada)	Goteh Ntignee (3)	
27	(Canada)	Sergio Camargo (6)	
28	(Saint Lucia)	Caniggia Elva	
