= 2025 Vancouver FC season =

Vancouver FC
2025 season
- President: Rob Friend
- Head coach: Afshin Ghotbi (until July 23); Martin Nash (from July 23)
- Stadium: Willoughby Stadium
- Canadian Premier League: 8th
- CPL playoffs: Did not qualify
- Canadian Championship: Runners-up
- Top goalscorer: League: Hugo Mbongue; Ndiaye Pathé (6 each); All: Nicolás Mezquida (8)
Home colours	Away colours

The 2025 Vancouver FC season was the third season in the history of Vancouver FC. In addition to the Canadian Premier League, the club also competed in the Canadian Championship.

Although the Eagles finished as the bottom of the CPL table, the club made an unlikely run to the Canadian Championship final, ultimately qualifying for the 2026 CONCACAF Champions Cup. Based on a comment from manager Afshin Ghotbi (who was relieved of his duties mid-season), the 2025 team became known as "the best last-place team in the history of the league."

== Squad ==
As of August 16, 2025

No.	Player	Nationality	Position(s)	Date of birth (age)	Previous club	Notes
Goalkeepers
1	Callum Irving	(Canada)	GK	March 16, 1993 (aged 32)	(Canada) Pacific FC	
31	Jakob Frank	(Canada)	GK		(Canada) Coastal FC	
Defenders
2	Paris Gee	(Canada)	LB / RB	July 5, 1994 (aged 31)	(Canada) York United	
3	Kunle Dada-Luke	(Canada)	RB / RW	January 12, 2000 (aged 25)	(Canada) Pacific FC	
4	Allan Enyou	(Uganda)	CB	December 24, 2003 (aged 22)	(Spain) Leganés B	INT, Loan
5	Matteo Campagna	(Canada)	CB / DM	June 27, 2004 (aged 21)	(Canada) Vancouver Whitecaps FC	U21
7	Thierno Bah	(Canada)	RB	July 30, 2004 (aged 21)	(Canada) Whitecaps FC 2	U21
12	Tyler Crawford	(Canada)	LB	March 9, 2004 (aged 21)	(United States) Michigan State Spartans	U21
13	David Norman Jr.	(Canada)	LB / MF	May 31, 1998 (aged 27)	(Republic of Ireland) St Patrick's Athletic	
15	Aidan O'Connor	(United States)	CB	October 7, 2001 (aged 24)	(United States) New York Red Bulls II	INT, Loan
40	Joey Buchanan	(Canada)	CB / DM	May 13, 2007 (aged 18)	(Canada) Burnaby FC	DEV
25	Pathé Ndiaye	(Senegal)	DF	April 27, 2004 (aged 21)	(Spain) CD Leganés B	INT, Loan
Midfielders
6	Vasco Fry	(Peru)	CM	July 30, 2000 (aged 25)	(Canada) Whitecaps FC 2	
10	Juan Batista	(Brazil)	DM / CM	September 26, 2001 (aged 24)	(Brazil) Foz do Iguaçu	INT
17	Emrick Fotsing	(Canada)	CM	September 27, 2007 (aged 18)	(Canada) CF Montréal Academy	U21, EYT
18	Thomas Powell	(Canada)	AM	May 11, 2001 (aged 24)	(Canada) Unity FC	U-S
20	Nicolás Mezquida	(Uruguay)	AM / RW	January 21, 1992 (aged 33)	(Uruguay) Rampla Juniors	INT
29	Kevin Podgorni	(Canada)	AM	February 24, 2008 (aged 17)	(Canada) ProStars FC	U21
32	Dominic Joseph	(Trinidad and Tobago)	MF	June 26, 2008 (aged 17)	(Canada) Vancouver FC U-19	DEV
16	Michel Cavalcante	(Brazil)	DM	May 23, 2006 (aged 19)	(Brazil) Fortaleza U20	INT
23	Abdoulaye Ouattara	(France)	DM / CM	January 8, 2001 (aged 24)	(United Arab Emirates) Elite Falcons FC	INT
	Zach Verhoven	(Canada)	MF	August 7, 1998 (aged 27)	(Australia) New Lambton FC	
Forwards
9	Hugo Mbongue	(Canada)	FW	July 27, 2004 (aged 21)	(Canada) Toronto FC	U21, Loan
11	Jay Herdman	(New Zealand)	AM / CM / CF	August 14, 2004 (aged 21)	(Canada) Cavalry FC	U21, Loan
14	Terran Campbell	(Canada)	ST / LW	October 10, 1998 (aged 27)	(Canada) Forge FC	
19	José Navarro	(Mexico)	CF	February 20, 2003 (aged 22)	(Mexico) UNAM	INT
Out on loan
	Alejandro Díaz	(Mexico)	FW	January 27, 1996 (aged 29)	(Canada) Pacific FC	
	Felipe Jaramillo	(Colombia)	GK	April 18, 2008 (aged 17)	(Canada) Toronto FC II	U21

== Transfers ==
=== In ===
No.	Pos.	Player	From club	Fee/notes	Date	Source
	MF	(Trinidad and Tobago) Dominic Joseph	(Canada) Vancouver FC U-19	Signed to a development contract	February 5, 2025	
	MF	(Canada) Emrick Fotsing	(Canada) CF Montréal Academy	Free	February 11, 2025	
	FW	(Canada) Terran Campbell	(Canada) Forge FC	Free	February 13, 2025	
	DF	(Canada) Kunle Dada-Luke	(Canada) Pacific FC	Free	March 6, 2025	
	MF	(Canada) Kevin Podgorni	(Canada) ProStars FC	Free	March 13, 2025	
	GK	(Colombia) Felipe Jaramillo	(Canada) VanCity Pro FA	Free	March 21, 2025	
	FW	(United States) Henri Godbout	(Canada) UBC Thunderbirds	Selected 2nd in the 2025 CPL–U Sports Draft, U-Sports contract	March 25, 2025	
	MF	(Tunisia) Mehdi Essoussi	(Canada) Toronto Varsity Blues	Selected 10th in the 2025 CPL–U Sports Draft, U-Sports contract	March 25, 2025	
	MF	(Canada) Thomas Powell	(Canada) Unity FC	U-Sports contract	March 28, 2025	
	MF	(Brazil) Juan Batista	(Brazil) Foz do Iguaçu	Free	April 6, 2025	
	MF	(Brazil) Michel Cavalcante	(Brazil) Fortaleza U20	Free	April 6, 2025	
	MF	(France) Abdoulaye Ouattara	(United Arab Emirates) Elite Falcons FC	Free	April 6, 2025	
	MF	(Uruguay) Nicolás Mezquida	(Uruguay) Rampla Juniors	Free	April 6, 2025	
	MF	(Canada) Zach Verhoven	(Australia) New Lambton FC	Free	September 12, 2025	
	GK	(Canada) Jakob Frank	(Canada) Coastal FC	Free	September 12, 2025	

==== Loans in ====
No.	Pos.	Player	Loaned from	Fee/notes	Date	Source
9	FW	(Mexico) Alejandro Díaz	(Norway) Sogndal	Loaned until June 30, 2025	July 7, 2023	
4	DF	(Uganda) Allan Enyou	(Spain) Leganés B	Loaned until end of season	February 20, 2025	
	DF	(Senegal) Pathé Ndiaye	(Spain) Leganés B	Loaned until end of season	April 6, 2025	
	DF	(United States) Aidan O'Connor	(United States) New York Red Bulls II	Loaned until end of season	May 1, 2025	
	FW	(Canada) Hugo Mbongue	(Canada) Toronto FC	Loaned until end of season	July 23, 2025	
11	FW	(New Zealand) Jay Herdman	(Canada) Cavalry FC	Loaned until end of season	August 8, 2025	

==== Draft picks ====
Vancouver FC selected the following players in the 2025 CPL–U Sports Draft. Draft picks are not automatically signed to the team roster. Only those who are signed to a contract will be listed as transfers in.

Round	Selection	Pos.	Player	Nationality	University
1	2	FW	Henri Godbout	USA	UBC
2	10	MF	Mehdi Essoussi	Tunisia	Toronto

=== Out ===
==== Transferred out ====
No.	Pos.	Player	To club	Fee/notes	Date	Source
18	FW	(Netherlands) Ayman Sellouf		Loan ended	November 10, 2024	
3	DF	(Canada) Rocco Romeo	(Canada) Valour FC	Contract expired	December 31, 2024	
21	FW	(Canada) Austin Ricci		Contract expired	December 31, 2024	
18	FW	(New Zealand) Moses Dyer	(Republic of Ireland) Galway United	Contract expired	December 31, 2024	
10	MF	(Lebanon) Gabriel Bitar	(Canada) York United	Transferred for York's first round pick in the 2026 CPL–U Sports Draft	January 13, 2025	
2	DF	(Canada) Kadin Chung	(Canada) Pacific FC	Option declined	January 13, 2025	
20	DF	(Canada) Anthony White		Option declined	January 13, 2025	
8	MF	(Brazil) Renan Garcia		Option declined	January 13, 2025	
16	MF	(Belgium) Olivier Rommens		Option declined	January 13, 2025	
17	MF	(Canada) Zach Verhoven	(Australia) New Lambton FC	Option declined	January 13, 2025	
7	MF	(Canada) Ben Fisk	Retired		January 16, 2025	
23	MF	(Republic of Ireland) Grady McDonnell	(Belgium) Club Brugge	Undisclosed fee & sell-on clause	January 31, 2025	
25	DF	(Canada) James Cameron	(United States) Colorado Rapids 2	Undisclosed fee & sell-on clause	February 28, 2025	
28	GK	(Canada) Niko Giantsopoulos	Retired		March 5, 2025	
11	FW	(Haiti) Mikaël Cantave		Contract terminated by mutual consent	July 23, 2025	
26	MF	(Canada) Taryck Tahid	(Albania) KF Skënderbeu Korçë	Free Transfer, with potential for additional future compensation	September 10, 2025	

==== Loans out ====
No.	Pos.	Player	To club	Fee/notes	Date	Source
9	FW	(Mexico) Alejandro Díaz	(Canada) Pacific FC	Loaned until end of season, with option for permanent transfer	July 23, 2025	
43	GK	(Colombia) Felipe Jaramillo	(Canada) Toronto FC II	Loaned until end of season	September 12, 2025	

== Competitions ==
=== Overview ===
Competition	Starting round	Record							
Competition	Starting round	Pld	W	D	L	GF	GA	GD	Win %
Canadian Premier League	Matchday 1	28	4	9	15	35	57	−22	14.29
Canadian Championship	First round	6	1	3	2	8	9	−1	16.67
Total		34	5	12	17	43	66	−23	14.71

Last updated: October 18, 2025
Source: Competitions

=== Canadian Premier League ===
==== Table ====
Pos	Team	Pld	W	D	L	GF	GA	GD	Pts	Qualification
1	Forge (S)	28	16	10	2	51	22	+29	58	First semifinal and 2026 CONCACAF Champions Cup
2	Atlético Ottawa (C)	28	15	11	2	54	28	+26	56	First semifinal
3	Cavalry	28	11	9	8	47	36	+11	42	Quarterfinal
4	HFX Wanderers	28	11	6	11	41	34	+7	39	Play-in round
5	York United	28	10	8	10	43	38	+5	38	Play-in round
6	Valour	28	7	5	16	35	62	−27	26	
7	Pacific	28	5	8	15	30	59	−29	23	
8	Vancouver	28	4	9	15	35	57	−22	21	2026 CONCACAF Champions Cup (Note: Vancouver FC qualified for the Champions Cup as the runners-up of the 2025 Canadian Championship, due to the winners, Vancouver Whitecaps FC, qualifying through Major League Soccer.)

Source: CanPL
Rules for classification: 1) Points; 2) Total number of wins; 3) Head-to-head; 4) Goal differential; 5) Goals for; 6) Away goals differential; 7) Away goals for; 8) Home goals differential; 9) Home goals for; 10) Fewest disciplinary points; 11) Most under-21 domestic player minutes; 12) Drawing of lots.
(C) Champion (qualified to Champions Cup Round one); (S) CPL Shield winner (qualified to Champions Cup Round one)

==== Results by match ====
Match	1	2	3	4	5	6	7	8	9	10	11	12	13	14	15	16	17	18	19	20	21	22	23	24	25	26	27	28
Result	L	L	D	D	W	L	L	D	L	L	L	D	L	D	L	L	W	L	L	L	L	L	D	W	W	D	D	D
Position	7	7	8	7	4	6	7	7	8	8	8	8	8	8	8	8	8	8	8	8	8	8	8	8	8	8	8	8

Updated to match(es) played on October 18, 2025. Source: #Matches
W = Win; D = Draw; L = Loss

==== Matches ====
April 6 1	Vancouver FC	0–2	York United FC	Langley Township, British Columbia
4:00pm PT	Fry (yellow card) 54'	Report	Ferrin (yellow card) 20'; Altobelli 66', 84'; Singh (yellow card) 70'; Jimoh (yellow card) 75'	Stadium: Willoughby Stadium; Referee: Alain Ruch
Note: Vancouver FC player Vasco Fry was issued a 2-match suspension after the game for serious foul play.

April 13 2	Vancouver FC	1–4	Atlético Ottawa	Langley Township, British Columbia
3:00pm PT	Campbell 66'; Díaz (yellow card) 90+1'	Report	Rodríguez 20'; Santos 37'; Tabla 42'; Castro (yellow card) 45+1'; Didić (yellow card) 54'; Patterson 83'	Stadium: Willoughby Stadium; Referee: Scott Bowman

April 18 3	Cavalry FC	1–1	Vancouver FC	Foothills County, Alberta
5:00pm MT	Shome (yellow card) 38'; Henry (yellow card) 50'; Warschewski 90+5'	Report	Mezquida 19'; Campagna (yellow card) 21'; Norman Jr. (yellow card) 27'; Bah (yellow card) 85'; Díaz (yellow card) 90+7'	Stadium: ATCO Field; Referee: Ben Hoskins

April 26 4	Vancouver FC	1–1	Pacific FC	Langley Township, British Columbia
5:00pm PT	Mezquida 17' (yellow card) 69'; Dada-Luke (red card) 51'; Fry (yellow card) 56'; Gee (yellow card) 81'; Bah (yellow card) 90+2'	Report	Machado (yellow card) 43'; Heard (yellow card) 45'; Ndom 70'; Browning Lagerfeldt (yellow card) 80'	Stadium: Willoughby Stadium; Referee: Mathieu Souaré

May 3 5	Valour FC	1–3	Vancouver FC	Winnipeg, Manitoba
6:00pm CT	Twardek (yellow card) 12' (yellow-red card) 64'; Layne (yellow card) 46' (yellow-red card) 85'; Venâncio 66'	Report	Fry 33'; Díaz 38'; Fotsing (yellow card) 80'; Norman Jr. (yellow card) 83'; Ndiaye 90+5'	Stadium: Princess Auto Stadium; Referee: Carly Shaw-MacLaren

May 17 6	Vancouver FC	0–2	HFX Wanderers FC	Langley Township, British Columbia
5:00pm PT	Campagna (yellow card) 20'; Norman Jr. (yellow card) 40'	Report	Yesli (yellow card) 53'; Telfer 59'; Bahamboula (yellow card) 77'; Coimbra 90+4'	Stadium: Willoughby Stadium; Referee: Roberto D'Alesio

May 25 7	York United FC	1–0	Vancouver FC	Toronto, Ontario
2:00pm ET	Altobelli 29'; Botello (yellow card) 87'; León (yellow card) 90+4'; De La Rosa (yellow card) 90+4'	Report	Essoussi (yellow card) 43'; Godbout (yellow card) 79'; O'Connor (yellow card) 90+3'; Tahid (yellow card) 90+3'	Stadium: York Lions Stadium; Referee: Mario Alayass

May 30 8	Vancouver FC	2–2	Atlético Ottawa	Langley Township, British Columbia
7:00pm PT	Cloutier 13' (o.g.); Díaz (yellow card) 28'; Bah (yellow card) 35'; Fotsing 45'; Fry (yellow card) 48'; Mezquida (yellow card) 84'	Report	Salter 55'; Rodríguez 64'; Walker (yellow card) 90+2'	Stadium: Willoughby Stadium; Referee: Scott Bowman

June 4 9	Valour FC	3–1	Vancouver FC	Winnipeg, Manitoba
11:00am CT	Ohin (yellow card) 37'; Twardek 44'; Facchineri (red card) 45+6'; Figueiredo (yellow card) 69'; Egwu 73'; Faria 82'	Report	Fotsing 17', (yellow card) 63'; Dada-Luke (red card) 45+6'; Norman Jr. (yellow card) 45+6'	Stadium: Princess Auto Stadium; Referee: Yusri Rudolf

June 15 10	Vancouver FC	0–2	Forge FC	Langley Township, British Columbia
1:00pm PT	Navarro (yellow card) 37'; Norman Jr. (yellow card) 45+2'; Fry (yellow card) 80'	Report	Bekker 52', (yellow card) 58'; Owolabi-Belewu (yellow card) 64'; Nimick 79' (pen.)	Stadium: Willoughby Stadium; Referee: Sebastian Noshinravani

June 21 11	HFX Wanderers FC	1–0	Vancouver FC	Halifax, Nova Scotia
4:00pm AT	Johnston (yellow card) 12'; Coimbra (yellow card) 25'; Meilleur-Giguère 77'; Callegari (yellow card) 80'	Report	Enyou (yellow card) 17'; Bah (yellow card) 85'	Stadium: Wanderers Grounds; Referee: Renzo Villanueva

June 27 12	Pacific FC	4–4	Vancouver FC	Langford, British Columbia
7:00pm PT	Ndom 17', 54', (yellow card) 90+7'; Bustos (yellow card) 40'; Toualy 76'; Irving 90+3' (o.g.)	Report	Godbout 55'; Norman Jr. 64'; Ndiaye 89'; Mezquida 90+1', (yellow card) 90+2'	Stadium: Starlight Stadium; Attendance: 2821; Referee: Roberto D'Alesio

July 5 13	Forge FC	2–1	Vancouver FC	Hamilton, Ontario
7:00pm ET	Campagna 23' (o.g.); Paton (yellow card) 60'; Filion 73'	Report	Campagna (yellow card) 36'; Fry 90+3'; Enyou (yellow card) 90+7'	Stadium: Tim Hortons Field; Referee: Yusri Rudolf

July 13 14	Vancouver FC	0–0	Cavalry FC	Langley Township, British Columbia
6:00pm PT	Enyou (yellow card) 21'; Fry (yellow card) 27'; Norman Jr. (yellow card) 48'; Mezquida (red card) 62'	Report	Gherasimencov (yellow card) 19'; Piepgrass (yellow card) 29'; Warschewski (yellow card) 69'	Stadium: Willoughby Stadium; Referee: Ben Hoskins

July 19 15	York United FC	4–0	Vancouver FC	Toronto, Ontario
4:00pm ET	Reid 3'; Bitar 84', 90+2'; Kibato 88'	Report	O'Connor (yellow card) 49'	Stadium: York Lions Stadium; Referee: Iwan-Nikita Jecanski

July 25 16	Vancouver FC	1–3	Valour FC	Langley Township, British Columbia
7:00pm PT	Bah 29'; Enyou (yellow card) 51'	Report	Froese 3'; Facchineri (yellow card) 9', (goal) 66'; Mlah (yellow card) 22'; Egwu (yellow card) 43'; Twardek (yellow card) 71', (goal) 73'; Viscosi (yellow card) 80'	Stadium: Willoughby Stadium; Referee: Renzo Villanueva

August 4 17	HFX Wanderers FC	1–2	Vancouver FC	Halifax, Nova Scotia
4:00pm AT	Johnston (yellow card) 53'; Meilleur-Giguère 89'	Report	Campagna 40'; Mbongue 46'; Fry (yellow card) 83'; Essoussi (yellow card) 84'; Mezquida (yellow card) 90+5'	Stadium: Wanderers Grounds; Referee: Alain Ruch

August 10 18	Vancouver FC	2–3	Pacific FC	Langley Township, British Columbia
3:00pm PT	Bah 33'; Ndiaye 49'; Norman Jr. (yellow card) 56'; Enyou (yellow card) 90+5'	Report	Díaz 45+4' (pen.), 60'; Heard 46'; Browning Lagerfeldt (yellow card) 69'	Stadium: Willoughby Stadium; Referee: Scott Bowman

August 17 19	Cavalry FC	5–4	Vancouver FC	Foothills County, Alberta
4:00pm MT	Ntignee 3'; Warschewski 4'; Baldisimo 26', (yellow card) 59'; Gherasimencov 88'; Carducci (yellow card) 90+4'; Klomp 90+7'	Report	Mezquida 18' (pen.); Campbell 33'; Mbongue (yellow card) 38', (goal) 58'; Dada-Luke (yellow card) 48'; O'Connor (yellow card) 62'; Fotsing 90+5'	Stadium: ATCO Field; Referee: Mario Alayass

August 22 20	Vancouver FC	0–1	Forge FC	Langley Township, British Columbia
7:00pm PT	Bah (yellow card) 42'; Campagna (yellow card) 87'	Report	Babouli 45+1'; Wright (yellow card) 56'	Stadium: Willoughby Stadium; Referee: Seyed Mohammad Mohseni

August 30 21	Atlético Ottawa	3–1	Vancouver FC	Ottawa, Ontario
7:00pm ET	Rodríguez 30'; Salter 40'; O'Connor 80' (o.g.); Sissoko (yellow card) 90+3'	Report	Mezquida 25'; Campagna (yellow card) 38'; O'Connor (yellow card) 81'; Ndiaye (yellow card) 85'	Stadium: TD Place Stadium; Referee: Carly Shaw-MacLaren

September 5 22	Vancouver FC	2–5	Valour FC	Langley Township, British Columbia
7:30pm PT	Campbell 1'; Mbongue 65'; Norman Jr. (yellow card) 69'; Ndiaye (yellow card) 85'	Report	Morgan 16', 44', 61'; Faria 47'; Figueiredo 90+5'	Stadium: Willoughby Stadium; Referee: Youcef Boumsied

September 13 23	Pacific FC	1–1	Vancouver FC	Langford, British Columbia
4:00pm PT	Mukumbilwa (yellow card) 38'; Ndom (yellow card) 46', (goal) 90+4'	Report	Ndiaye (yellow card) 34'; Mbongue 45' (pen.); Dada-Luke (yellow card) 90+5'	Stadium: Starlight Stadium; Referee: Ben Hoskins

September 21 24	Vancouver FC	2–1	York United FC	Langley Township, British Columbia
3:00pm PT	Ndiaye 31'; Gee 44', (yellow card) 59'; Campbell (yellow card) 74'	Report	Sturing (yellow card) 15'; Ferrin 40'	Stadium: Willoughby Stadium; Referee: Mathieu Souaré

September 28 25	Vancouver FC	3–1	HFX Wanderers FC	Langley Township, British Columbia
3:00pm PT	O'Connor (yellow card) 18'; Fry (yellow card) 26'; Mbongue 35', 44', (yellow card) 66'; Ndiaye 90+2'	Report	Baï (yellow card) 45+2'; Alphonse (yellow card) 54'; Meilleur-Giguère 90+4'	Stadium: Willoughby Stadium; Referee: Fabrizio Stasolla

October 4 26	Forge FC	1–1	Vancouver FC	Hamilton, Ontario
5:00pm ET	Borges 45'; Rama (yellow card) 60'; Koné (yellow card) 89'	Report	Norman Jr. (yellow card) 43'; Crawford (yellow card) 52'; Fotsing 72', (yellow card) 90+6'; Ouattara (yellow card) 77'	Stadium: Tim Hortons Field; Referee: Yusri Rudolf

October 12 27	Atlético Ottawa	0–0	Vancouver FC	Ottawa, Ontario
3:00pm ET	Abatneh (yellow card) 90+3'	Report	Fry (yellow card) 35'; Ouattara (yellow card) 39'; Michel (yellow card) 72'; Campagna (yellow card) 88'; Dada-Luke (yellow card) 90+5'; Mezquida (yellow card) 90+5'	Stadium: TD Place Stadium; Referee: Michael Venne

October 18 28	Vancouver FC	2–2	Cavalry FC	Langley Township, British Columbia
1:00pm PT	Gee (yellow card) 48'; Ouattara (yellow card) 54'; Crawford (red card) 60'; Ndiaye 82'; Norman Jr. 90+6' (pen.)	Report	Musse (yellow card) 26'; Myroniuk 78'; Kobza (yellow card) 81'; Elva 90+1'	Stadium: Willoughby Stadium; Referee: Renzo Villanueva

=== Canadian Championship ===
May 6 First round	Pacific FC	1–1 (2–4 p)	Vancouver FC	Langford, British Columbia
7:00pm PT	Lajeunesse (yellow card) 33'; Ndom 49'; Vales (yellow card) 66'; Anchor (yellow card) 73'	Report	Díaz 34' (pen.), (yellow card) 53'; Norman Jr. (yellow card) 62'; Dada-Luke (yellow card) 84'	Stadium: Starlight Stadium; Referee: Michael Venne
	Penalties
	Bustos (penalty missed); Ndom (penalty scored); Keshavarz (penalty scored); Montejano (penalty missed)		(penalty scored) Díaz; (penalty scored) Mezquida; (penalty missed) Fry; (penalty scored) O'Connor; (penalty scored) Norman Jr.

May 21 QF Leg 1	Vancouver FC	1–1	Cavalry FC	Langley Township, British Columbia
7:00pm PT	O'Connor (yellow card) 21'; Bah (yellow card) 28'; Norman Jr. 41'; Fry (yellow card) 51'; Díaz (yellow card) 51'	Report	Gherasimencov (yellow card) 25'; Piepgrass (yellow card) 29'; Warschewski 84'	Stadium: Willoughby Stadium; Referee: Renzo Villanueva

July 8 QF Leg 2	Cavalry FC	1–1 (2–2 agg.) (4–5 p)	Vancouver FC	Foothills County, Alberta
7:30pm MT	Gutiérrez (yellow card) 45+1'; Shome (yellow card) 62'; O'Connor 66' (o.g.); Musse (yellow card) 72'	Report	Mezquida 23' (pen.); Fry (yellow card) 26'; O'Connor (yellow card) 32'; Godbout (yellow card) 76'	Stadium: ATCO Field; Referee: Michael Venne
	Penalties
	Warschewski (penalty missed); Elva (penalty scored); Gherasimencov (penalty scored); Aird (penalty scored); Musse (penalty scored); Henry (penalty missed)		(penalty scored) Mezquida; (penalty scored) Norman Jr.; (penalty scored) O'Connor; (penalty scored) Campbell; (penalty missed) Powell; (penalty scored) Batista

August 13 SF Leg 1	Vancouver FC	3–1	Atlético Ottawa	Langley Township, British Columbia
7:00pm PT	Michel 21'; Mbongue 69'; Mezquida 90+1'	Report	Salter 58'	Stadium: Willoughby Stadium; Referee: Pierre Luc Lauziere

September 18 SF Leg 2	Atlético Ottawa	1–0 (2–3 agg.)	Vancouver FC	Ottawa, Ontario
7:00pm ET	Coulanges (yellow card) 24'; Rodríguez 45', (yellow card) 90+2'	Report	Cavalcante (yellow card) 29'; Bah (yellow card) 77'; Gee (yellow card) 90+2'	Stadium: TD Place Stadium; Referee: Filip Dujic

October 1 Final	Vancouver Whitecaps FC	4–2	Vancouver FC	Vancouver, British Columbia
7:00pm PT	Ahmed 5', 36'; Müller 10' (pen.); Gauld 83'	Report	Bah 35'; Mezquida 85'	Stadium: BC Place; Attendance: 18,372; Referee: Drew Fischer

== Statistics ==
=== Appearances and goals ===
As of October 18, 2025

No.	Pos	Nat	Player	Total		CPL		Canadian Championship	
No.	Pos	Nat	Player	Apps	Goals	Apps	Goals	Apps	Goals
Goalkeepers
1	GK	(Canada) CAN	Callum Irving	34	0	28	0	6	0
Defenders
2	DF	(Canada) CAN	Paris Gee	29	1	13+12	1	2+2	0
3	DF	(Canada) CAN	Kunle Dada-Luke	29	0	21+2	0	6	0
4	DF	(Uganda) UGA	Allan Enyou	27	0	22+1	0	1+3	0
5	DF	(Canada) CAN	Matteo Campagna	33	1	26+1	1	5+1	0
7	DF	(Canada) CAN	Thierno Bah	33	3	25+2	2	6	1
12	DF	(Canada) CAN	Tyler Crawford	5	0	3	0	0+2	0
13	DF	(Canada) CAN	David Norman Jr.	29	3	20+3	2	3+3	1
15	DF	(United States) USA	Aidan O'Connor	24	0	16+2	0	6	0
25	DF	(Senegal) SEN	Pathé Ndiaye	26	6	10+11	6	2+3	0
Midfielders
6	MF	(Peru) PER	Vasco Fry	29	2	22+1	2	6	0
8	MF	(Tunisia) TUN	Mehdi Essoussi	18	0	10+5	0	3	0
8	MF	(Canada) CAN	Zach Verhoven	2	0	0+2	0	0	0
10	MF	(Brazil) BRA	Juan Batista	17	0	3+11	0	1+2	0
11	MF	(Canada) CAN	Jay Herdman	3	0	2+1	0	0	0
16	MF	(Brazil) BRA	Michel Cavalcante	16	1	5+8	0	3	1
17	MF	(Canada) CAN	Emrick Fotsing	26	4	15+6	4	1+4	0
18	MF	(Canada) CAN	Thomas Powell	20	0	6+12	0	0+2	0
20	MF	(Uruguay) URU	Nicolás Mezquida	23	8	11+7	5	4+1	3
23	MF	(France) FRA	Abdoulaye Ouattara	7	0	4+3	0	0	0
29	MF	(Canada) CAN	Kevin Podgorni	7	0	1+6	0	0	0
32	MF	(Trinidad and Tobago) TTO	Dominic Joseph	1	0	0+1	0	0	0
Forwards
9	FW	(Canada) CAN	Hugo Mbongue	15	7	11+1	6	3	1
14	FW	(Canada) CAN	Terran Campbell	29	3	16+7	3	5+1	0
19	FW	(Mexico) MEX	José Navarro	4	0	1+3	0	0	0
24	FW	(Canada) CAN	Henri Godbout	17	1	5+11	1	1	0
Players transferred out during the season
9	FW	(Mexico) MEX	Alejandro Díaz	12	2	10	1	2	1
26	MF	(Canada) CAN	Taryck Tahid	10	0	2+8	0	0	0

Source: Competitions

=== Goalscorers ===
As of October 18, 2025

Rank	No.	Pos	Nat	Name	CPL	Canadian Championship	Total
1	20	MF	(Uruguay)	Nicolás Mezquida	5	3	8
2	9	FW	(Canada)	Hugo Mbongue	6	1	7
3	25	DF	(Senegal)	Pathé Ndiaye	6	0	6
4	17	MF	(Canada)	Emrick Fotsing	4	0	4
5	7	DF	(Canada)	Thierno Bah	2	1	3
5	13	DF	(Canada)	David Norman Jr.	2	1	3
5	14	FW	(Canada)	Terran Campbell	3	0	3
8	6	MF	(Peru)	Vasco Fry	2	0	2
8		FW	(Mexico)	Alejandro Díaz	1	1	2
10	2	DF	(Canada)	Paris Gee	1	0	1
10	5	DF	(Canada)	Matteo Campagna	1	0	1
10	16	MF	(Brazil)	Michel Cavalcante	0	1	1
10	24	FW	(Canada)	Henri Godbout	1	0	1
Own Goals					1	0	1
Totals					35	8	43

=== Clean sheets ===
As of October 18, 2025

Rank	No.	Pos	Nat	Name	CPL	Canadian Championship	Total
1	1	GK	(Canada)	Callum Irving	2	0	2
Totals					2	0	2

=== Disciplinary record ===
As of October 18, 2025

No.	Pos	Nat	Player	CPL			Canadian Championship			Total		
No.	Pos	Nat	Player	Yellow card	(yellow card) (yellow-red card)	Red card	Yellow card	(yellow card) (yellow-red card)	Red card	Yellow card	(yellow card) (yellow-red card)	Red card
1	GK	(Canada)	Callum Irving	0	0	0	0	0	0	0	0	0
2	DF	(Canada)	Paris Gee	3	0	0	1	0	0	4	0	0
3	DF	(Canada)	Kunle Dada-Luke	3	0	2	2	0	0	5	0	2
4	DF	(Uganda)	Allan Enyou	5	0	0	0	0	0	5	0	0
5	DF	(Canada)	Matteo Campagna	6	0	0	0	0	0	6	0	0
6	MF	(Peru)	Vasco Fry	8	0	0	3	0	0	11	0	0
7	DF	(Canada)	Thierno Bah	5	0	0	2	0	0	7	0	0
8	MF	(Tunisia)	Mehdi Essoussi	1	0	0	0	0	0	1	0	0
8	MF	(Canada)	Zach Verhoven	0	0	0	0	0	0	0	0	0
9	FW	(Canada)	Hugo Mbongue	2	0	0	0	0	0	2	0	0
9	FW	(Mexico)	Alejandro Díaz	3	0	0	2	0	0	5	0	0
10	MF	(Brazil)	Juan Batista	0	0	0	0	0	0	0	0	0
11	MF	(Canada)	Jay Herdman	0	0	0	0	0	0	0	0	0
12	DF	(Canada)	Tyler Crawford	1	0	1	0	0	0	1	0	1
13	DF	(Canada)	David Norman Jr.	9	0	0	1	0	0	10	0	0
14	FW	(Canada)	Terran Campbell	1	0	0	0	0	0	1	0	0
15	DF	(United States)	Aidan O'Connor	5	0	0	2	0	0	7	0	0
16	MF	(Brazil)	Michel Cavalcante	1	0	0	2	0	0	3	0	0
17	MF	(Canada)	Emrick Fotsing	3	0	0	0	0	0	3	0	0
18	MF	(Canada)	Thomas Powell	0	0	0	0	0	0	0	0	0
19	FW	(Mexico)	José Navarro	1	0	0	0	0	0	1	0	0
20	MF	(Uruguay)	Nicolás Mezquida	5	0	1	0	0	0	5	0	1
23	MF	(France)	Abdoulaye Ouattara	3	0	0	0	0	0	3	0	0
24	FW	(Canada)	Henri Godbout	1	0	0	1	0	0	2	0	0
25	DF	(Senegal)	Pathé Ndiaye	3	0	0	1	0	0	4	0	0
26	MF	(Ghana)	Taryck Tahid	1	0	0	0	0	0	1	0	0
29	MF	(Canada)	Kevin Podgorni	0	0	0	0	0	0	0	0	0
32	MF	(Trinidad and Tobago)	Dominic Joseph	0	0	0	0	0	0	0	0	0
Totals				70	0	4	17	0	0	87	0	4
