= 2025 Canadian Championship final =

Final match of a Canadian soccer tournament

Canadian Championship final
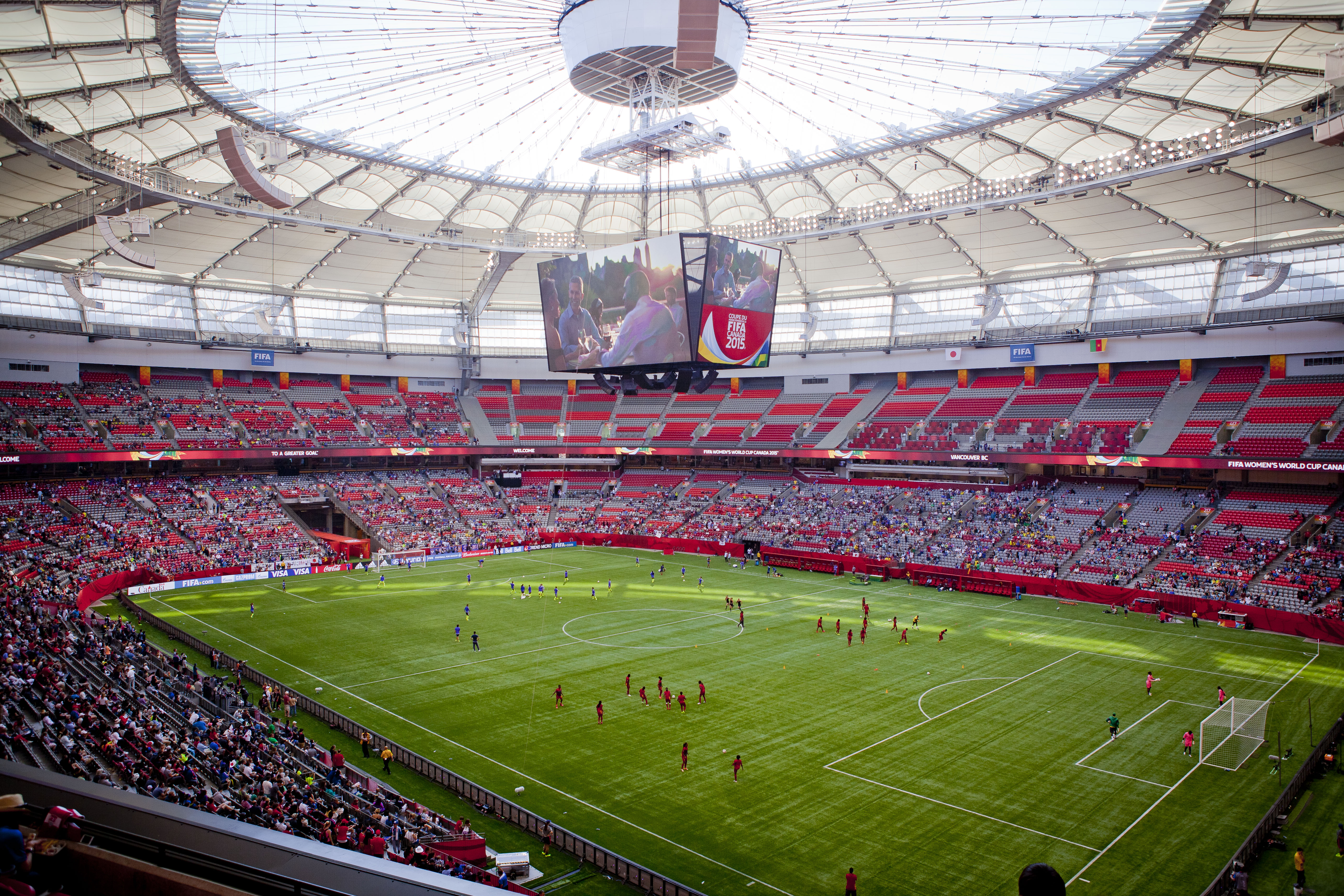
- BC Place in Vancouver hosted the match.
- Event: 2025 Canadian Championship
Vancouver Whitecaps FC	Vancouver FC
4	2
- Date: October 1, 2025
- Venue: BC Place, Vancouver, British Columbia
- Player of the Match: Ali Ahmed (Vancouver Whitecaps FC)
- Referee: Drew Fischer
- Attendance: 18,372

The 2025 Canadian Championship final was the deciding match of the 2025 Canadian Championship and was played on October 1, 2025. For the fourth year in a row, it was hosted at BC Place in Vancouver, British Columbia, by three-time defending champions Vancouver Whitecaps FC, who faced first-time finalists Vancouver FC. This marked the first ever meeting between the two professional teams from the Greater Vancouver area.

Vancouver Whitecaps FC won a 4–2 victory, earning their fourth consecutive title. This was the second time in event history that a team won four times in a row, after Toronto FC from 2009 to 2012. As winners, the Whitecaps qualified for the 2026 CONCACAF Champions Cup; after the Whitecaps qualified for the tournament through MLS, the berth was transferred to Vancouver FC.

== Teams ==
Team	League	City	Previous finals appearances (bold indicates winners)
Vancouver Whitecaps FC	Major League Soccer	Vancouver, British Columbia	8 (2011, 2012, 2013, **2015**, 2016, 2018, **2022**, **2023**, **2024**)
Vancouver FC	Canadian Premier League	Langley, British Columbia	0

== Background ==
This was the first ever meeting between the two clubs.

=== Path to the final ===
Vancouver Whitecaps FC		Round	Vancouver FC	
Opponent	Result	Round	Opponent	Result
Bye		Preliminary round	Pacific FC	1–1 (4–2 p) (away)
Valour FC	4–3 agg.	Quarter-finals	Cavalry FC	2–2 agg. (5–4 p)
Forge FC	6–2 agg.	Semi-finals	Atlético Ottawa	3–2 agg.

== Match details ==
October 1, 2025
7:00 pm PDT

Vancouver Whitecaps FC	4–2	Vancouver FC
Ahmed 5', 36'; Müller 10' (pen.); Gauld 83'	Report	Bah 35'; Mezquida 85'

BC Place, Vancouver, British Columbia
Attendance: 18,372
Referee: Drew Fischer

**Vancouver Whitecaps FC**	**Vancouver FC**

GK	32	(Canada) Isaac Boehmer
RB	18	(Colombia) Édier Ocampo	(substituted off) 85'
CB	12	(Syria) Belal Halbouni
CB	2	(Uruguay) Mathías Laborda
LB	28	(United States) Tate Johnson
CM	16	(United States) Sebastian Berhalter	(substituted off) 86'
CM	20	(Paraguay) Andrés Cubas
RW	11	(United States) Emmanuel Sabbi
AM	13	(Germany) Thomas Müller (c)	(substituted off) 79'
LW	22	(Canada) Ali Ahmed	(substituted off) 79'
CF	75	(Tunisia) Rayan Elloumi	(substituted off) 68'
Substitutes:
GK	1	(Japan) Yohei Takaoka
MF	6	(Canada) Ralph Priso	(substituted on) 86'
FW	7	(Canada) Jayden Nelson	(substituted on) 79'
MF	17	(Peru) Kenji Cabrera	(substituted on) 68'
MF	25	(Scotland) Ryan Gauld	(substituted on) 79'
MF	26	(Cameroon) J.C. Ngando
DF	27	(Australia) Giuseppe Bovalina	(substituted on) 85'
DF	53	(United States) Mark O'Neill
MF	59	(Canada) Jeevan Badwal
Manager: (Denmark) Jesper Sørensen

GK	1	(Canada) Callum Irving (c)
RB	3	(Canada) Kunle Dada-Luke	(yellow card) 16'	(substituted off) 46'
CB	5	(Canada) Matteo Campagna
CB	15	(United States) Aidan O'Connor
LB	2	(Canada) Paris Gee
CM	6	(Peru) Vasco Fry		(substituted off) 68'
CM	16	(Brazil) Michel Cavalcante	(yellow card) 39'	(substituted off) 68'
CM	20	(Uruguay) Nicolás Mezquida		(substituted off) 87'
RW	14	(Canada) Terran Campbell		(substituted off) 56'
CF	9	(Canada) Hugo Mbongue
LW	7	(Canada) Thierno Bah	(yellow card) 48'
Substitutes:
GK	31	(Canada) Jakob Frank
DF	4	(Uganda) Allan Enyou		(substituted on) 87'
DF	12	(Canada) Tyler Crawford		(substituted on) 46'
DF	13	(Canada) David Norman Jr.		(substituted on) 68'
MF	17	(Canada) Emrick Fotsing		(substituted on) 68'
MF	18	(Canada) Thomas Powell
MF	23	(Ivory Coast) Abdoulaye Ouattara
FW	25	(Senegal) Ndiaye Pathé	(yellow card) 72'	(substituted on) 56'
FW	29	(Canada) Kevin Podgorni
Manager: (Canada) Martin Nash

Player of the Match:
Ali Ahmed (Vancouver Whitecaps FC)

Assistant referees:
Chris Wattam
Lyes Arfa
Fourth official:
Pierre-Luc Lauzière
Fifth official:
Peter Pendli
