= 2025 Canadian Championship =

Canadian men's soccer tournament

Championnat canadien 2025 (French)

Tournament details
- Country: Canada
- Date: April 29 – October 1
- Teams: 15 (from 6 leagues)

Final positions
- Champions: Vancouver Whitecaps FC (5th title)
- Runners-up: Vancouver FC

Tournament statistics
- Matches played: 20
- Goals scored: 69 (3.45 per match)
- Attendance: 114,943 (5,747 per match)
- Top goal scorer(s): Julian Altobelli; Samuel Salter (4 goals each)

Awards
- George Gross Memorial Trophy: Ali Ahmed
- Best young player: Jayden Nelson

The 2025 Canadian Championship (French: Championnat canadien 2025) was the eighteenth edition of the Canadian Championship, the premier men's domestic cup competition in Canadian soccer, and the 24th competition staged to determine the winner of the Voyageurs Cup.

It featured all eleven professional men's soccer teams in Canada, three from Major League Soccer and eight from the Canadian Premier League, along with the champions of the four semi-professional League1 Canada competitions: Edmonton Scottish, FC Laval, TSS Rovers FC, and Scrosoppi FC. This tournament marked the first Voyageurs Cup campaign for Edmonton Scottish and Scrosoppi FC. Edmonton Scottish were the first ever representatives of League1 Alberta in the Canadian Championship's history.

Vancouver Whitecaps FC earned their fourth consecutive title after defeating Vancouver FC 4–2 in the final, held at BC Place in Vancouver. As winners, they would have qualified for the 2026 CONCACAF Champions Cup but because they also qualified for a spot based on their standings in the 2025 MLS season, Vancouver FC qualified as Canadian Championship runners-up.

== Format ==
The tournament consisted of four rounds. The preliminary round consisted of single matches; ties were decided by a penalty shoot-out. The quarter-finals and semi-finals were two-legged ties; if the aggregate score was level, the tie was decided by penalty shoot-out. The final was a single leg; if tied, the champion would have been decided by extra time and, if required, a penalty shoot-out.

The winner of the 2024 Canadian Championship, Vancouver Whitecaps FC, received a bye to the quarter-finals; the remaining fourteen teams began the competition in the preliminary round. Hosting privileges up to the semi-finals were determined based on the Canadian Championship ranking index; for two-legged ties, the team with the higher ranking hosted the second match.

== Teams ==
2025 Canadian Championship (Canada)
Montreal area clubs: CF Montréal; FC Laval
Toronto area clubs: Toronto FC; York United FC
Vancouver area clubs: Vancouver Whitecaps FC; Vancouver FC; TSS Rovers FC

Canadian Premier League Major League Soccer League1 Canada

Rank	League	Team	Location	Entry round	App.	Previous best (last)
1	Major League Soccer	Vancouver Whitecaps FC	Vancouver, BC	Quarter-finals	17th	Winners (2024)
2	Major League Soccer	Toronto FC	Toronto, Ontario	Preliminary round	18th	Winners (2020)
3	Major League Soccer	CF Montréal	Montreal, Quebec	Preliminary round	17th	Winners (2021)
4	Canadian Premier League	Forge FC	Hamilton, Ontario	Preliminary round	7th	Runners-up (2020)
5	Canadian Premier League	Pacific FC	Langford, BC	Preliminary round	6th	Semi-finals (2024)
6	Canadian Premier League	York United FC	Toronto, Ontario	Preliminary round	6th	Semi-finals (2022)
7	Canadian Premier League	Cavalry FC	Foothills County, Alberta	Preliminary round	6th	Semi-finals (2019)
8	Canadian Premier League	Atlético Ottawa	Ottawa, Ontario	Preliminary round	5th	Quarter-finals (2024)
9	Canadian Premier League	HFX Wanderers FC	Halifax, Nova Scotia	Preliminary round	6th	Quarter-finals (2022)
10	Canadian Premier League	Valour FC	Winnipeg, Manitoba	Preliminary round	6th	Quarter-finals (2021)
11	Canadian Premier League	Vancouver FC	Langley, BC	Preliminary round	3rd	Preliminary round (2024)
12	League1 Canada (division champions)	TSS Rovers FC (L1BC)	Burnaby, BC	Preliminary round	3rd	Quarter-finals (2023)
13	League1 Canada (division champions)	FC Laval (L1QC)	Laval, Quebec	Preliminary round	2nd	Preliminary round (2023)
14	League1 Canada (division champions)	Scrosoppi FC (L1ON)	Milton, Ontario	Preliminary round	1st	—
15	League1 Canada (division champions)	Edmonton Scottish (L1AB)	Edmonton, Alberta	Preliminary round	1st	—

== Schedule ==
Round	Draw date	First leg	Second leg
Preliminary round	December 12	April 29 – May 7	
Quarter-finals	December 12	May 20–21 & June 11	July 8–9
Semi-finals	July 9	August 13	September 16 & 18
Final	July 9	October 1	

== Draw ==
There were two draws to determine the matchups of the tournament: one draw to determine the preliminary round and quarter-final matchups, and another to determine the semi-final and final rounds.

=== First draw ===
The first draw to determine preliminary round matchups and the pathway through the quarter-finals was conducted on December 12, 2024. Teams were separated into east and west regions for the draw, and semi-pro teams could not be drawn against each other in the preliminary round. Vancouver Whitecaps FC were given a bye to the quarter-finals as 2024 champions.

West	West semi-pro	East	East semi-pro	Bye
Cavalry FC; Pacific FC; Valour FC; Vancouver FC	Edmonton Scottish; TSS Rovers FC	Atlético Ottawa; CF Montréal; Forge FC; HFX Wanderers FC; Toronto FC; York United FC	FC Laval; Scrosoppi FC	Vancouver Whitecaps FC

=== Second draw ===
The second draw was held at half-time of the last quarter-final match between Vancouver Whitecaps FC and Valour FC on July 9. The draw resulted in Forge FC against Vancouver Whitecaps FC, with the winner also hosting the final. In the other semi-final, Atlético Ottawa was matched up with Vancouver FC.

== Bracket ==
Preliminary round single match
Winnipeg, MB
CPL	Valour FC	1
L1BC	TSS Rovers FC	0
Toronto (BMO), ON
MLS	Toronto FC	2 (2)
MLS	CF Montréal (p)	2 (3)
Hamilton, ON
CPL	Forge FC	3
CPL	HFX Wanderers FC	1
Ottawa, ON
CPL	Atlético Ottawa	2
L1O	Scrosoppi FC	0
Toronto (York Lions), ON
CPL	York United FC	5
L1Q	FC Laval	0
Langford, BC
CPL	Pacific FC	1 (2)
CPL	Vancouver FC (p)	1 (4)
Foothills County, AB
CPL	Cavalry FC	6
L1AB	Edmonton Scottish	0

Quarter-finals two-legged tie
MLS	Vancouver Whitecaps FC	2	2	4
CPL	Valour FC	2	1	3
MLS	CF Montréal	0	2	2
CPL	Forge FC	1	2	3
CPL	Atlético Ottawa	2	4	6
CPL	York United FC	1	3	4
CPL	Vancouver FC	1	1	2 (5)
CPL	Cavalry FC	1	1	2 (4)

Semi-finals two-legged tie
MLS	Vancouver Whitecaps FC	2	4	6
CPL	Forge FC	2	0	2
CPL	Atlético Ottawa	1	1	2
CPL	Vancouver FC	3	0	3

Final single match
Vancouver, BC
MLS	Vancouver Whitecaps FC	4
CPL	Vancouver FC	2

== Preliminary round ==
=== Summary ===
Home team	Score	Away team
Valour FC	1–0	TSS Rovers FC
Pacific FC	1–1 (2–4 p)	Vancouver FC
Cavalry FC	6–0	Edmonton Scottish
Atlético Ottawa	2–0	Scrosoppi FC
York United FC	5–0	FC Laval
Toronto FC	2–2 (2–3 p)	CF Montréal
Forge FC	3–1	HFX Wanderers FC

=== Matches ===
May 7
7:00 pm CDT

Valour FC	1–0	TSS Rovers FC
Ressurreição 65'	Report

Princess Auto Stadium, Winnipeg, Manitoba
Attendance: 1,438
Referee: Mario Al-Ayass

May 6
7:00 pm PDT

Pacific FC	1–1	Vancouver FC
Ndom 50'	Report	Díaz 34' (pen.)
Penalties
Bustos (penalty missed); Ndom (penalty scored); Keshavarz (penalty scored); Montejano (penalty missed)	2–4	(penalty scored) Díaz; (penalty scored) Mezquida; (penalty missed) Fry; (penalty scored) O'Connor; (penalty scored) Norman

Starlight Stadium, Langford, British Columbia
Attendance: 2,017
Referee: Michael Venne

April 29
7:00 pm MDT

Cavalry FC	6–0	Edmonton Scottish
Elva 9'; Myroniuk 18'; Wähling 61'; Musse 72'; Piepgrass 79'; Warschewski 87'	Report

ATCO Field, Foothills County, Alberta
Attendance: 2,552
Referee: Yusri Rudolf

April 29
7:00 pm EDT

Atlético Ottawa	2–0	Scrosoppi FC
Dos Santos 12'; Salter 86'	Report

TD Place Stadium, Ottawa, Ontario
Attendance: 2,229
Referee: Sebastian Noshinravani

May 6
7:00 pm EDT

York United FC	5–0	FC Laval
Altobelli 45'; Ferrari 45+3'; Reid 52'; Rosa 64'; Ferrin 79' (pen.)	Report

York Lions Stadium, Toronto, Ontario
Attendance: 1,072
Referee: Ben Hoskins

April 30
7:00 pm EDT

Toronto FC	2–2	CF Montréal
Corbeanu 29'; Spicer 74'	Report	Waterman 70'; Vrioni 88'
Penalties
Spicer (penalty missed); Franklin (penalty scored); Coello (penalty scored); Corbeanu (penalty missed); Brynhildsen (penalty missed)	2–3	(penalty scored) Waterman; (penalty scored) Sealy; (penalty scored) Yankov; (penalty missed) Pearce

BMO Field, Toronto, Ontario
Attendance: 20,265
Referee: Michael Venne

May 7
7:00 pm EDT

Forge FC	3–1	HFX Wanderers FC
Babouli 22', 90+1'; Sow 26' (o.g.)	Report	Meilleur-Giguère 41'

Hamilton Stadium, Hamilton, Ontario
Attendance: 3,098
Referee: Alain Ruch

== Quarter-finals ==
=== Summary ===
Team 1	Agg.	Team 2	1st leg	2nd leg
Valour FC	3–4	Vancouver Whitecaps FC	2–2	1–2
Vancouver FC	2–2 (5–4 p)	Cavalry FC	1–1	1–1
Atlético Ottawa	6–4	York United FC	2–1	4–3
Forge FC	3–2	CF Montréal	1–0	2–2

=== Matches ===
May 20
7:30 pm CDT

Valour FC	2–2	Vancouver Whitecaps FC
Romeo 38'; Figueiredo 51'	Report	Adekugbe 6'; Ahmed 80'

Princess Auto Stadium, Winnipeg, Manitoba
Attendance: 3,476
Referee: Yusri Rudolf
July 9
7:00 pm PDT

Vancouver Whitecaps FC	2–1	Valour FC
Sabbi 79'; Utvik 90'	Report	Layne 86'

BC Place, Vancouver, British Columbia
Attendance: 14,536
Referee: Alain Ruch

Vancouver Whitecaps FC won 4–3 on aggregate.

May 21
7:00 pm PDT

Vancouver FC	1–1	Cavalry FC
Norman 41'	Report	Warschewski 81'

Willoughby Community Park, Langley, British Columbia
Attendance: 1,434
Referee: Renzo Villanueva
July 8
7:30 pm MDT

Cavalry FC	1–1	Vancouver FC
O'Connor 66' (o.g.)	Report	Mezquida 23' (pen.)
Penalties
Warschewski (penalty missed); Elva (penalty scored); Gherasimencov (penalty scored); Aird (penalty scored); Musse (penalty scored); Henry (penalty missed)	4–5	(penalty scored) Mezquida; (penalty scored) Norman; (penalty scored) O'Connor; (penalty scored) Campbell; (penalty missed) Powell; (penalty scored) Batista

ATCO Field, Foothills County, Alberta
Attendance: 2,177
Referee: Michael Venne

2–2 on aggregate. Vancouver FC won 5–4 on penalties.

June 11
7:00 pm EDT

Atlético Ottawa	2–1	York United FC
Tabla 16'; Rodríguez 18'	Report	Altobelli 5'

TD Place Stadium, Ottawa, Ontario
Attendance: 2,084
Referee: Mario Al-Ayass
July 8
7:00 pm EDT

York United FC	3–4	Atlético Ottawa
Altobelli 13', 37'; Ferrin 53'	Report	Rodríguez 20'; Salter 22', 84'; Sissoko 90+2'

York Lions Stadium, Toronto, Ontario
Attendance: 688
Referee: Sebastian Noshinravani

Atlético Ottawa won 6–4 on aggregate.

May 20
7:00 pm EDT

Forge FC	1–0	CF Montréal
Wright 78'	Report

Hamilton Stadium, Hamilton, Ontario
Attendance: 3,064
Referee: Ben Hoskins
July 9
7:00 pm EDT

CF Montréal	2–2	Forge FC
Owusu 58', 90+5'	Report	Borges 79'; Bekker 82'

Saputo Stadium, Montreal, Quebec
Attendance: 13,125
Referee: Renzo Villanueva

Forge FC won 3–2 on aggregate.

== Semi-finals ==
=== Summary ===
Team 1	Agg.	Team 2	1st leg	2nd leg
Forge FC	2–6	Vancouver Whitecaps FC	2–2	0–4
Vancouver FC	3–2	Atlético Ottawa	3–1	0–1

=== Matches ===
August 13
7:00 pm EDT

Forge FC	2–2	Vancouver Whitecaps FC
Ampomah 11'; Wright 34'	Report	Blackmon 18'; White 29'

Hamilton Stadium, Hamilton, Ontario
Attendance: 8,324
Referee: Yusri Rudolf
September 16
7:00 pm PDT

Vancouver Whitecaps FC	4–0	Forge FC
Blackmon 7'; Ngando 28'; Berhalter 49' (pen.); Nelson 83'	Report

BC Place, Vancouver, British Columbia
Attendance: 10,752
Referee: Michael Venne

Vancouver Whitecaps FC won 6–2 on aggregate.

August 13
7:00 pm PDT

Vancouver FC	3–1	Atlético Ottawa
Michel 21'; Mbongue 69'; Mezquida 90+1'	Report	Salter 58'

Willoughby Community Park, Langley, British Columbia
Attendance: 1,380
Referee: Pierre-Luc Lauzière
September 18
7:00 pm EDT

Atlético Ottawa	1–0	Vancouver FC
Rodríguez 45'	Report

TD Place Stadium, Ottawa, Ontario
Attendance: 2,860
Referee: Filip Dujic

Vancouver FC won 3–2 on aggregate.

== Final ==
The winner qualified for the 2026 CONCACAF Champions Cup.

October 1, 2025
7:00 pm PDT

Vancouver Whitecaps FC	4–2	Vancouver FC
Ahmed 5', 36'; Müller 10' (pen.); Gauld 83'	Report	Bah 35'; Mezquida 85'

BC Place, Vancouver, British Columbia
Attendance: 18,372
Referee: Drew Fischer

== Top goalscorers ==
Source: FotMob, CanPL

Rank	Player	Team	Goals
1	(Canada) Julian Altobelli	York United FC	4
1	(Canada) Samuel Salter	Atlético Ottawa	4
3	(Canada) Ali Ahmed	Vancouver Whitecaps FC	3
3	(Uruguay) Nicolás Mezquida	Vancouver FC	3
3	(United States) David Rodríguez	Atlético Ottawa	3
6	(Syria) Molham Babouli	Forge FC	2
6	(United States) Tristan Blackmon	Vancouver Whitecaps FC	2
6	(Canada) Massimo Ferrin	York United FC	2
6	(Germany) Prince Owusu	CF Montréal	2
6	(Germany) Tobias Warschewski	Cavalry FC	2
6	(Canada) Brian Wright	Forge FC	2
