= Mehdi Essoussi =

Tunisian footballer (born 2001)

Personal information
- Date of birth: 28 February 2001 (age 25)
- Place of birth: Tunis, Tunisia
- Height: 6 ft 1 in (1.85 m)
- Position: Midfielder

Team information
- Current team: Unionville Milliken SC

Youth career
- Nepean Hotspurs
- 2011: Ottawa Fury
- 2010–2016: Ottawa South United
- 2017–2021: Toronto FC

College career
Years	Team	Apps	(Gls)
2023–	Toronto Varsity Blues	30	(5)

Senior career*
Years	Team	Apps	(Gls)
2018	Toronto FC III	13	(1)
2019–2022	Toronto FC II	24	(0)
2022	→ Toronto FC (loan)	0	(0)
2023–2024	Alliance United FC	30	(1)
2025	Vancouver FC	15	(0)
2025–2026	Canadian Crusaders (indoor)	3	(2)
2026–	Unionville Milliken SC	8	(0)
- * Club domestic league appearances and goals as of May 31, 2026

Mehdi Essoussi (born 28 February 2001) is a Tunisian footballer who plays as a midfielder for Unionville Milliken SC in the Ontario Premier League.

== Early life ==
Essoussi was born in Tunis, Tunisia, before moving to Montreal, Canada, when he was one, followed by a move to Ottawa at age two. He began playing youth soccer at age four with the Nepean Hotspurs SC, before moving on to Ottawa South United and spending some time in the Ottawa Fury Academy. He then moved on to join the Toronto FC Academy. He also played with the Team Ontario provincial team and attended a Canada national team identification camp.

== University career ==
Essoussi began attending the University of Toronto while playing professionally with Toronto FC II, thereby being ineligible to play for the school team until one full year after his final professional appearance. In 2023, after sitting out the beginning of the season due to the eligibility rules, he eventually joined the men's soccer team, making one appearance that season. In 2024, he was named the team captain and was named an OUA East First Team All-Star. In 2025, he was again named an OUA East First Team All-Star and was also named a U Sports Second Team All-Canadian.

== Club career ==
In 2018, he began playing for Toronto FC III in the semi-professional League1 Ontario. He scored his first goal on 12 August against Sigma FC. He was named a 2nd team all-star at the end of the season.

On 27 September 2018, he signed his first professional contract with Toronto FC II to join them for the 2019 season. He made his debut on June 19 against the Lansing Ignite. On 21 May 2022, he signed a short-term loan with the first team Toronto FC.

In 2023, he began playing with Alliance United FC in League1 Ontario.

At the 2025 CPL–U Sports Draft, Essoussi was selected in the second round (10th overall) by Vancouver FC. On 24 March 2025, he signed a U-Sports contract with Vancouver for the 2025 season. In August 2025, he departed the club to return to university, as per the terms of his U-Sports contract, with the club retaining his rights for the 2026 season.

== International career ==
Eligible to represent both his native Tunisia and Canada, he was called up to the Canadian under-15 national team camp in March 2016.

== Career statistics ==
As of August 19, 2025

Club	Season	League			Playoffs		Domestic Cup		League Cup		Continental		Total	
Club	Season	Division	Apps	Goals	Apps	Goals	Apps	Goals	Apps	Goals	Apps	Goals	Apps	Goals
Toronto FC III	2018	League1 Ontario	13	1	–		–		2	0	–		15	1
Toronto FC II	2019	USL League One	6	0	–		–		–		–		6	0
Toronto FC II	2021	USL League One	15	0	–		–		–		–		15	0
Toronto FC II	2022	MLS Next Pro	3	0	0	0	–		–		–		3	0
Toronto FC II	Total		24	0	0	0	0	0	0	0	0	0	24	0
Toronto FC (loan)	2022	Major League Soccer	0	0	–		0	0	–		–		0	0
Alliance United FC	2023	League1 Ontario	12	0	–		–		–		–		12	0
Alliance United FC	2024	League1 Ontario Premier	18	1	–		–		1	0	–		19	1
Alliance United FC	Total		30	1	0	0	0	0	1	0	0	0	31	1
Vancouver FC	2025	Canadian Premier League	15	0	–		3	0	–		–		18	0
Career total			82	2	0	0	3	0	3	0	0	0	98	2
