= Max Piepgrass =

Canadian soccer player (born 2004)

Personal information
- Full name: Maxwell Reed Pieprass
- Date of birth: February 7, 2004 (age 22)
- Place of birth: Canada
- Height: 1.75 m (5 ft 9 in)
- Position: Midfielder

Team information
- Current team: Pacific FC

Youth career
- 2013–2021: Calgary Foothills

College career
Years	Team	Apps	(Gls)
2022–	CBU Capers	21	(2)

Senior career*
Years	Team	Apps	(Gls)
2021	Cavalry FC	2	(0)
2024–2026	Cavalry FC II	10	(0)
2024–2026	Cavalry FC	16	(0)
2026–	Pacific FC	7	(0)
- * Club domestic league appearances and goals as of October 27, 2026

Maxwell Reed Piepgrass (born April 7, 2004) is a Canadian soccer player who plays as a midfielder for Canadian Premier League club Pacific FC.

== Early life ==
Piepgrass played youth soccer with the Calgary Foothills. In 2019, he played for Team Alberta at the Western Canada Summer Games. He became part of the Cavalry FC U20 development squad and in August 2020 was invited to train with the club's first team during the 2020 season.

== University career ==
In November 2021, he committed to Cape Breton University to play for the men's soccer team beginning in the fall of 2022. In 2023, he was named an AUS First Team All-Star. In 2024, he was named an AUS Second Team All-Star. In 2025, he was named the AUS Most Valuable Player, and named an AUS First Team All Star and U Sports First Team All-Canadian.

== Club career ==
=== Cavalry FC ===
In August 2021, he signed a developmental contract with Cavalry FC in the Canadian Premier League. He made his professional debut for the club on August 11 against Pacific FC. In 2023, Piepgrass played for League1 Alberta club Calgary Foothills in the 2023 League1 Alberta Exhibition Series. In April 2024, he signed a U Sports contract with Cavalry, allowing him to maintain his university eligibility. In August 2024, he departed the club to return to university, per the terms of his U Sports contract, with the club retaining his rights for 2025. In February 2025, he signed a short-term contract with the club for their CONCACAF Champions Cup matches. Piepgrass would score his first goal for the club in a 6-0 win in the 2025 Canadian Championship against League1 Alberta side Edmonton Scottish. In August 2025, he extended his U Sports contract for the remainder of the season. In September 2025, it was confirmed that Piepgrass would return to University with Cape Breton for the remainder of the 2025 season.

=== Pacific FC ===
In July 2026, Piepgrass would transfer to fellow Canadian Premier League club Pacific FC.

== International career ==
In April 2022, Piepgrass was called up to the Canadian Under-20 side for two matches against Costa Rica.

== Career statistics ==
As of match played July 10, 2026

Club	Season	League			Playoffs		Domestic Cup		Continental		Total	
Club	Season	Division	Apps	Goals	Apps	Goals	Apps	Goals	Apps	Goals	Apps	Goals
Cavalry FC	2023	Canadian Premier League	2	0	0	0	1	0	0	0	3	0
Cavalry FC II	2024	Alberta Premier League	6	0	—		—		—		6	0
Cavalry FC II	2026	Alberta Premier League	4	0	—		—		—		4	0
Cavalry FC II	Total		10	0	0	0	0	0	0	0	10	0
Cavalry FC	2025	Canadian Premier League	15	0	0	0	2	0	0	0	17	0
Cavalry FC	2026	Canadian Premier League	1	0	0	0	0	0	0	0	1	0
Cavalry FC	Career total		16	0	0	0	2	0	0	0	18	0
Career total			28	0	0	0	3	0	0	0	31	0
