= Allan Enyou =

Ugandan footballer (born 2003)

Personal information
- Date of birth: 24 December 2003 (age 22)
- Place of birth: Uganda
- Height: 1.89 m (6 ft 2 in)
- Position: Defender

Team information
- Current team: Tukums 2000
- Number: 46

Youth career
- Maroons
- 2022: KCCA

Senior career*
Years	Team	Apps	(Gls)
2022–2023	KCCA		
2022–2023	→ Elite Falcons FC (loan)		
2023	Elite Falcons FC		
2023–2025	Leganés B	1	(0)
2023	→ Super Nova (loan)	10	(0)
2024–2025	→ Vancouver FC (loan)	46	(0)
2026–	Tukums 2000	15	(0)
- * Club domestic league appearances and goals as of 10 November 2026

Allan Enyou (born 24 December 2003) is a Ugandan professional footballer who plays for Latvian Higher League side Tukums 2000.

== Early life ==
Enyou played youth football with Maroons FC. He later played with the Kampala Capital City Authority FC U20 team, helping them win the Cambiasso and Rainbow U-20 Tournament held in Tanzania.

== Club career ==
In July 2022, Enyou signed with Uganda Premier League club Kampala Capital City Authority FC (KCCA) on a five-year contract. In September 2022, he was loaned to UAE Third Division League club Elite Falcons FC, with a purchase option.

In February 2023, he joined the Elite Falcons on a permanent contract, signing a five-year deal. However, later that month, he transferred to Spanish side CD Leganés B in the fourth tier Segunda Federación. In July 2023, he was loaned to SK Super Nova in the Latvian first tier Virslīga. In May 2024, he joined Canadian Premier League club Vancouver FC on a full-year loan. In 2025, his loan was extended for a second season.

== International career ==
In January 2023, Enyou was named to a preliminary camp with the Uganda U20 team. He was named to another camp the following month.

In May 2023, he was called up to the Uganda senior team for the first time, for a preliminary camp.

== Career statistics ==
As of 22 October 2025

Club	Season	League			Domestic Cup		Other		Total	
Club	Season	Division	Apps	Goals	Apps	Goals	Apps	Goals	Apps	Goals
Leganés B	2022–23	Segunda Federación	1	0	–		–		1	0
Super Nova (loan)	2023	Virslīga	10	0	0	0	–		10	0
Vancouver FC (loan)	2024	Canadian Premier League	23	0	0	0	–		23	0
Vancouver FC (loan)	2025	Canadian Premier League	23	0	4	0	–		27	0
Vancouver FC (loan)	Total		46	0	4	0	0	0	50	0
Career total			57	0	4	0	0	0	61	0
