= Matteo Campagna =

Canadian soccer player (born 2004)

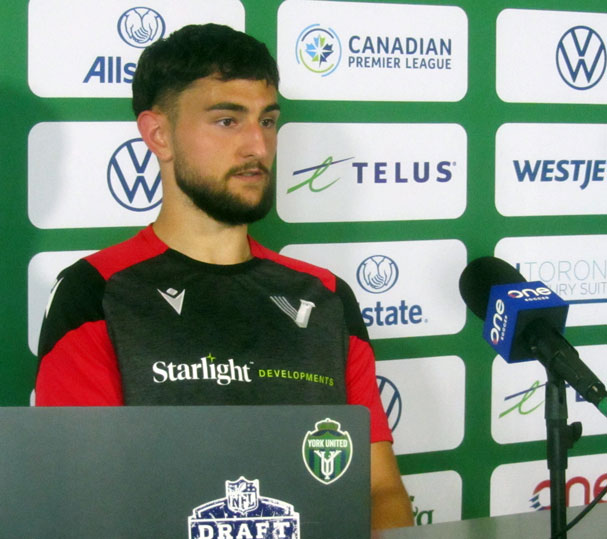
- Campagna in 2025

Personal information
- Full name: Matteo William Campagna
- Date of birth: June 27, 2004 (age 22)
- Place of birth: Vancouver, British Columbia, Canada
- Height: 1.88 m (6 ft 2 in)
- Positions: Defender; defensive midfielder

Team information
- Current team: Vancouver FC
- Number: 5

Youth career
- Surrey United SC
- 2017–2021: Vancouver Whitecaps FC

Senior career*
Years	Team	Apps	(Gls)
2021–2023	Vancouver Whitecaps FC	0	(0)
2021	→ York United (loan)	5	(0)
2022–2023	→ Whitecaps FC 2 (loan)	29	(1)
2024–	Vancouver FC	66	(4)

International career^{‡}
2019	Canada U15	5	(0)
2022	Canada U20	6	(0)
- * Club domestic league appearances and goals as of October 27, 2026 ‡ National team caps and goals as of June 26, 2022

Matteo William Campagna (born June 27, 2004) is a Canadian professional soccer player who plays for Vancouver FC in the Canadian Premier League.

== Early life ==
Campagna began playing soccer at age five with Surrey United SC. He was also part of the BC Soccer Provincial Program. In 2017, he joined the Vancouver Whitecaps FC Academy.

== Club career ==
In April 2021, Campagna signed a Homegrown player contract with Vancouver Whitecaps FC. On August 24, 2021, Campagna was loaned to Canadian Premier League side York United for the remainder of the season. He made his professional debut four days later on August 28, against Forge FC. In 2022, he was loaned to the second team, Whitecaps FC 2 in MLS Next Pro. On March 15, 2023, he made his debut for the first team in a CONCACAF Champions League match against Honduran club Real España, coming on as a substitute. On May 25, 2023, he scored his first professional goal with Whitecaps 2, scoring against San Jose Earthquakes II. After the 2023 season, Campagna's contract option for the 2024 season would be declined by the Whitecaps, ending his time with the club.

In April 2024, he signed a one-year contract with club options for 2025 and 2026 with Vancouver FC of the Canadian Premier League. He made his debut on May 3 against Cavalry FC. An early season injury led to him entering a battle to earn minutes, eventually becoming a consistent substitute upon his return, earning him the nickname "The Closer" for the team. After the 2024 season, the club picked up his option for the 2025 season.

== International career ==
In 2019, Campagna made his debut in the Canadian youth program attending a camp with the Canada U15 team. He was then subsequently named to the roster for the 2019 CONCACAF Boys' Under-15 Championship, where he played in all five of the team's matches, making four starts. In April 2022, Campagna was called up to the Canadian U20 side for two friendlies against Costa Rica. In June 2022, he was named to the roster for the 2022 CONCACAF U-20 Championship.

== Personal life ==
Campagna was born in Canada to an Italian father and Canadian mother. He is the younger brother of professional soccer player Cristian Campagna.

== Career statistics ==
As of October 22, 2025

Club	Season	League			Playoffs		Domestic Cup		Continental		Other		Total	
Club	Season	Division	Apps	Goals	Apps	Goals	Apps	Goals	Apps	Goals	Apps	Goals	Apps	Goals
Vancouver Whitecaps FC	2021	Major League Soccer	0	0	0	0	0	0	–		–		0	0
Vancouver Whitecaps FC	2022	Major League Soccer	0	0	–		0	0	–		–		0	0
Vancouver Whitecaps FC	2023	Major League Soccer	0	0	–		0	0	1	0	0	0	1	0
Vancouver Whitecaps FC	Total		0	0	0	0	0	0	1	0	0	0	1	0
York United FC (loan)	2021	Canadian Premier League	5	0	0	0	0	0	–		–		5	0
Whitecaps FC 2 (loan)	2022	MLS Next Pro	16	0	–		–		–		–		16	0
Whitecaps FC 2 (loan)	2023	MLS Next Pro	10	1	–		–		–		–		10	1
Whitecaps FC 2 (loan)	Total		26	1	0	0	0	0	0	0	0	0	26	1
Vancouver FC	2024	Canadian Premier League	11	0	–		0	0	–		–		11	0
Vancouver FC	2025	Canadian Premier League	27	1	–		6	0	–		–		33	1
Vancouver FC	Total		38	1	0	0	6	0	0	0	0	0	44	1
Career total			69	2	0	0	6	0	1	0	0	0	76	2
