= Henri Godbout =

American soccer player (born 2005)

Personal information
- Full name: Henri Kim Godbout
- Date of birth: April 27, 2005 (age 21)
- Place of birth: Seattle, Washington, United States
- Height: 6 ft 1 in (1.85 m)
- Position: Forward

Team information
- Current team: Vancouver FC
- Number: 24

Youth career
- Crossfire Premier SC
- FC Tokyo

College career
Years	Team	Apps	(Gls)
2024–	UBC Thunderbirds	21	(10)

Senior career*
Years	Team	Apps	(Gls)
2024	Altitude FC	1	(0)
2025–	Vancouver FC	22	(1)
2025	→ Langley United (loan)	1	(0)
- * Club domestic league appearances and goals as of October 27, 2026

Henri Kim Godbout (born April 27, 2005) is an American soccer player who plays for Vancouver FC in the Canadian Premier League.

== Early life ==
Godbout grew up in Seattle and played youth soccer with Crossfire Premier SC, before later moving to Japan and playing in the academy of FC Toripletta.

== University career ==
In 2024, Godbout began attending the University of British Columbia, where he played for the men's soccer team. On August 24, 2024, he scored his first goal for UBC in a 3-1 victory over the Thompson Rivers WolfPack. On September 7, 2024, he scored a brace in a 4-1 victory over the UFV Cascades, which earned him Canada West Player of the Week honours. He scored another brace on November 7, 2024 over the UNB Reds to help UBC advance to the U Sports semi-finals. At the end of his first season, he was named the Canada West Rookie of the Year and named to the Canada West All-Rookie Team, Canada West Second Team All-Star, the U Sports All-Rookie Team, and the U Sports All-Tournament team (where UBC won the national title).

== Club career ==
In 2024, he played with Altitude FC in League1 British Columbia.

At the 2025 CPL-U Sports Draft, Godbout was selected in the first round (2nd overall) by Vancouver FC. In March 2025, he signed a U Sports contract with the club, allowing him to maintain his university eligibility. On June 27, 2025, he scored his first goal in a 4-4 draw with Pacific FC. In August 2025, he departed the club to return to university, as per the terms of his U Sports contract, with the club retaining his rights for the 2026 season. In January 2026, he returned to Vancouver on another U-Sports contract.

== Career statistics ==
As of August 15, 2025

Club	Season	League			Playoffs		Domestic Cup		League Cup		Total	
Club	Season	Division	Apps	Goals	Apps	Goals	Apps	Goals	Apps	Goals	Apps	Goals
Altitude FC	2024	League1 British Columbia	1	0	2	0	–		–		3	0
Vancouver FC	2025	League1 British Columbia	16	1	–		1	0	–		17	1
Langley United (loan)	2025	League1 British Columbia	1	0	–		–		–		3	0
Career total			18	1	2	0	1	0	0	0	21	1
