= Ndiaye Pathé =

Senegalese footballer (born 2004)

Personal information
- Date of birth: 27 April 2004 (age 22)
- Place of birth: Dakar, Senegal
- Height: 1.89 m (6 ft 2 1/2 in)
- Position: Defender

Team information
- Current team: Super Nova
- Number: 27

Youth career
- Noliane FC

Senior career*
Years	Team	Apps	(Gls)
2023–2024	Elite Falcons		
2024–2025	Leganés B	0	(0)
2025	→ Vancouver FC (loan)	21	(6)
2026–	Super Nova	29	(1)
- * Club domestic league appearances and goals as of 12 November 2026

Ndiaye Pathé (born 27 April 2004) is a Senegalese footballer who plays for Latvian Virslīga side Super Nova.

== Early life ==
Pathé played youth football in his native Senegal with Noliane FC.

== Club career ==
Pathé began his senior career with UAE Third Division League club Elite Falcons FC.

In July 2024, he joined Spanish Tercera Federación side Leganés B. In May 2025, he joined Canadian Premier League club Vancouver FC on a season-long loan. He scored his first goal in his debut appearance on 3 May 2025, against Valour FC.
