= Kevin Podgorni =

Canadian soccer player (born 2008)

Personal information
- Date of birth: February 24, 2008 (age 18)
- Place of birth: Kitchener, Ontario, Canada
- Height: 1.85 m (6 ft 1 in)
- Position: Midfielder

Team information
- Current team: Whitecaps FC Academy
- Number: 87

Youth career
- ProStars FC

Senior career*
Years	Team	Apps	(Gls)
2025–2026	Vancouver FC	7	(0)
2025	→ Langley United (loan)	4	(1)
2026–	Whitecaps FC Academy	3	(0)

International career^{‡}
2025–	Canada U17	1	(0)
- * Club domestic league appearances and goals as of October 7, 2026 ‡ National team caps and goals as of June 3, 2025

Kevin Podgorni (born February 24, 2008) is a Canadian professional soccer player who plays for British Columbia Premier League club Whitecaps FC Academy.

== Early life ==
Podgorni began playing youth soccer with ProStars FC at age eight.

== Club career ==
In March 2025, Podgorni signed a professional contract with Vancouver FC in the Canadian Premier League through 2026, with options for 2027 and 2028. He made his debut on April 6 against York United FC. In April 2026, just ahead of the start of the 2026 season, he agreed to a mutual contract termination with the club.

During the 2026 season, he played with Whitecaps FC Academy in the British Columbia Premier League.

== International career ==
In May 2025, Podgorni was called up to the Canada U17 for a training camp.
