= 2025 CPL–U Sports Draft =

Seventh annual Canadian Premier League sports draft

General information
- Sport: Soccer
- Date: December 5, 2024
- Time: 5:00 PM ET
- Networks: CBC Gem and cbcsports.ca OneSoccer; YouTube

Overview
- 16 total selections in 2 rounds
- League: Canadian Premier League
- Teams: 8
- First selection: Jevontae Layne, Valour FC

The 2025 CPL–U Sports Draft was the seventh annual CPL–U Sports Draft. Canadian Premier League (CPL) teams selected 16 eligible U Sports soccer players to be invited to their respective preseason camps with the opportunity to earn development contracts for the 2025 Canadian Premier League season.

== Format ==
Players could be selected if they had one to four years of U Sports eligibility remaining, were in good academic standing, were planning to return to school the following year, and completed the CPL's draft declaration form. Players who were selected can sign a full professional contract or a U Sports development contract, which allows them to return to university for the following season, without losing their eligibility.

Players interested in being selected were required to declare for the draft by November 21 at 5:00 pm ET. On November 29, the CPL released the full list of 184 players available for selection in the draft.

Each CPL team made two selections in the draft with selections made in the reverse order of the previous season's standings, including playoffs and final standings.

== Broadcasting ==
On November 28, the CPL confirmed the draft order and announced that the draft would be broadcast on CBC Gem, cbcsports.ca, OneSoccer, and YouTube on December 5, 2024 at 5:00 pm ET.

== Player selection ==
| ^{*} | Denotes player who has signed a professional contract for the 2025 season |
| ^{^} | Denotes player who has signed a developmental contract for the 2025 season |

The following players were selected:

=== Round 1 ===
| Pick # | CPL team | Player | Position | Nationality | University | Last team/academy |
|---|---|---|---|---|---|---|
| 1 | Valour FC | Jevontae Layne^{^} | FW | Canada | Toronto Metropolitan University | Simcoe County Rovers (L1O) |
| 2 | Vancouver FC | Henri Godbout^{^} | FW | USA (Note: Also holds Canadian citizenship) | University of British Columbia | Altitude FC (L1BC) |
| 3 | HFX Wanderers FC | Matthew Paiva | DF | Canada | McMaster University | Scrosoppi FC (L1O) |
| 4 | Pacific FC | Niklas Hallam | FW | Canada | University of Toronto | |
| 5 | York United FC | Luca Accettola^{^} | MF | Canada | York University | Toronto FC II (MLSNP) |
| 6 | Atlético Ottawa | Jason Hartill^{^} | MF | Canada | Cape Breton University | York United (CPL) |
| 7 | Forge FC | Paul Ekwueme | MF | Canada | McMaster University | Alliance United (L1O) |
| 8 | Cavalry FC | Harvey Hughes | FW | England | Cape Breton University | |

=== Round 2 ===
| Pick # | CPL team | Player | Position | Nationality | University | Last team/academy |
|---|---|---|---|---|---|---|
| 9 | Valour FC | Ibrahim Chami | DF | Lebanon | McGill University | AS Blainville (L1Q) |
| 10 | Vancouver FC | Mehdi Essoussi^{^} | MF | Canada | University of Toronto | Alliance United (L1O) |
| 11 | HFX Wanderers FC | Joven Mann^{^} | MF | Canada | University of British Columbia | Burnaby FC (L1BC) |
| 12 | Pacific FC | Fin Tugwell^{^} | DF | Canada | University of Victoria | |
| 13 | York United FC | Matthew Fischer | FW | Canada | York University | |
| 14 | Atlético Ottawa | Adam N’Goran | DF | Canada | Carleton University | Ottawa South United (L1Q) |
| 15 | Forge FC | Maxime Filion^{^} | FW | Canada | Université de Montréal | Ottawa South United (L1Q) |
| 16 | Cavalry FC | Owen Antoniuk^{^} | FW | Canada | University of Calgary | Calgary Foothills FC (L1A) |

== Selection statistics ==
=== Draftees by nationality ===
| Rank | Country | Selections |
|---|---|---|
| 1 | Canada | 13 |
| 2 | England | 1 |
| 2 | Lebanon | 1 |
| 2 | United States | 1 |
