= Emrick Fotsing =

Canadian soccer player (born 2007)

Personal information
- Full name: Emrick Durand Fotsing
- Date of birth: September 27, 2007 (age 19)
- Place of birth: Montréal, Québec, Canada
- Height: 1.80 m (5 ft 11 in)
- Position: Midfielder

Team information
- Current team: Vancouver FC (on loan from Vancouver Whitecaps FC)
- Number: 17

Youth career
- AS Mascouche
- AS Blainville
- 2021–2024: CF Montréal

Senior career*
Years	Team	Apps	(Gls)
2024	CF Montréal U23	5	(1)
2025–2026	Vancouver FC	31	(4)
2026–	Vancouver Whitecaps FC	0	(0)
2026–	→ Vancouver FC (loan)	0	(0)

International career^{‡}
2025	Canada U18	2	(1)
2025–	Canada U20	4	(2)
- * Club domestic league appearances and goals as of August 26, 2026 ‡ National team caps and goals as of July 29, 2026

Emrick Durand Fotsing (born September 27, 2007) is a Canadian soccer player who plays as midfielder for Vancouver FC in the Canadian Premier League, on loan from Major League Soccer club Vancouver Whitecaps FC.

== Early life ==
After beginning to play youth soccer in Laval, he moved to Mascouche, Quebec at age 8 joining AS Mascouche (now known as Union Lanaudière Sud) until the age of 13, before joining AS Blainville. He initially tried out for the CF Montréal Academy at U11 level, but was not accepted, before eventually joining at U14 level, eventually become team captain of the U18s. In December 2023, he was invited to train with Italian club Bologna's U17 and U18 team for three weeks. In January 2024, he was participated in pre-season training camp with the CF Montréal first team.

== Club career ==
In 2024, he played with CF Montréal U23 in Ligue1 Québec.

In February 2025, he signed an Exceptional Young Talent contract with Vancouver FC in the Canadian Premier League through 2027, with a club option for 2028. On May 30, 2025, he scored his first professional goal in a 2-2 draw against Atlético Ottawa. He began his first professional season serving mainly as a substitute, before earning a regular role in the starting XI by the end.

In August 2026, he joined Major League Soccer club Vancouver Whitecaps FC, signing through the 2029-30 season, with an option for an additional season. The deal was for a club record selling fee for Vancouver FC, and Fotsing would remain with Vancouver FC on loan for the remainder of the 2026 season.

== International career ==
In August 2025, Fotsing was called up to the Canada U18 team for a series of friendlies, his first ever international call-up.

== Career statistics ==
As of July 24, 2026

Club	Season	League			Playoffs		Domestic Cup		League Cup		Total	
Club	Season	Division	Apps	Goals	Apps	Goals	Apps	Goals	Apps	Goals	Apps	Goals
CF Montréal U23	2024	Ligue1 Québec	5	1	–		–		2	1	7	2
Vancouver FC	2025	Canadian Premier League	21	4	–		5	0	–		26	4
Vancouver FC	2026	Canadian Premier League	10	0	0	0	3	0	0	0	13	0
Vancouver FC	Total		31	4	0	0	8	0	0	0	39	4
Career total			36	5	0	0	8	0	2	1	46	6
