= Abdoulaye Ouattara (footballer, born 2005) =

French footballer (born 2005)

Personal information
- Date of birth: 25 August 2005 (age 21)
- Place of birth: France
- Height: 1.80 m (5 ft 11 in)
- Position: Midfielder

Team information
- Current team: Vancouver FC
- Number: 23

Senior career*
Years	Team	Apps	(Gls)
2024–2025	Elite Falcons FC		
2025–	Vancouver FC	19	(0)
2026–	→ Langley United (loan)	2	(1)
- * Club domestic league appearances and goals as of 27 October 2026

Abdoulaye Ouattara (born 25 August 2005) is a French professional footballer who plays for Canadian Premier League club Vancouver FC.

== Club career ==
During the 2024–2025 season, Ouattara played with Elite Falcons FC, helping them win the UAE Second Division League title.

In April 2025, Ouattara signed with Canadian Premier League club Vancouver FC on a one-year contract. However, he was initially unable to join the club, before officially joining in July 2025. After the 2025 season, the club picked up his option for 2026.
