= Michel da Silva =

Brazilian footballer (born 2002)

Personal information
- Full name: Michel Cavalcante Fonseca da Silva
- Date of birth: 23 February 2006 (age 20)
- Place of birth: Fortaleza, Brazil
- Height: 1.70 m (5 ft 7 in)
- Position: Midfielder

Team information
- Current team: Palmeiras (on loan from Vancouver FC)

Youth career
- 2009–2025: Fortaleza

Senior career*
Years	Team	Apps	(Gls)
2025–	Vancouver FC	13	(0)
2026–	→ Palmeiras (loan)	0	(0)
- * Club domestic league appearances and goals as of October 22, 2025

Michel Cavalcante Fonseca da Silva (born 23 February 2006) is a Brazilian professional footballer who plays for Brazilian Série A side Palmeiras, on loan from Vancouver FC in the Canadian Premier League.

== Early life ==
da Silva began playing youth football with Fortaleza at the U13 level. In April 2022, he signed his first professional contract with the club.

== Club career ==
In April 2025, da Silva signed with Canadian Premier League club Vancouver FC on a one-year contract. However, he was initially unable to join the club, before officially joining in July 2025. He scored his first goal in the semi-finals of the 2026 Canadian Championship against Atlético Ottawa.

In February 2026, he was loaned to Brazilian Série A side Palmeiras through January 2027, with Palmeiras also holding a purchase option. He is set to join the club's U20 team, during his loan stint.

== Career statistics ==
As of August 25, 2025

Club	Season	League			Playoffs		Domestic Cup		League Cup		Total	
Club	Season	Division	Apps	Goals	Apps	Goals	Apps	Goals	Apps	Goals	Apps	Goals
Vancouver FC	2025	Canadian Premier League	13	0	–		3	1	–		16	1
Career total			13	0	0	0	3	1	0	0	16	1
