= Juan Batista =

Brazilian footballer (born 2002)

Personal information
- Full name: Juan Batista Lopes da Silva
- Date of birth: 26 September 2001 (age 25)
- Place of birth: Recife, Brazil
- Height: 1.68 m (5 ft 6 in)
- Position: Midfielder

Youth career
- Figueirense
- 2019–2020: Atlético Paranaense
- 2020–2021: Santa Cruz

Senior career*
Years	Team	Apps	(Gls)
2021	Santa Cruz	0	(0)
2021	Treze	1	(0)
2021–2022	Masfout		
2023	Nacional-AM	6	(0)
2023	Unidos do Alvorada	5	(1)
2024	Baraúnas	1	(0)
2024	Taquaritinga	9	(5)
2024–2025	Foz do Iguaçu	5	(0)
2025	Vancouver FC	14	(0)
- * Club domestic league appearances and goals as of 22 October 2025

Juan Batista Lopes da Silva (born 26 September 2001) is a Brazilian professional footballer.

== Early life ==
Batista played youth football with Figueirense and Atlético Paranaense. In 2020, he joined the U20 side of Santa Cruz.

== Club career ==
During the 2020–21 season, Batista was promoted to the Santa Cruz first team.

In May 2021, he signed with Treze.

In September 2021, he signed with Masfout in the UAE First Division League.

In November 2022, Batista signed with Nacional for the 2023 season. In July 2023, he departed the club by mutual agreement, after having made six appearances.

He then joined Unidos do Alvorada.

In December 2023, he signed with Baraúnas.

In March 2024, he moved to Taquaritinga. On 24 March 2024, he scored a highlight reel goal in a 1–0 victory over América-SP, with the club launching a campaign to try to have the goal nominated for the FIFA Puskás Award.

In April 2024, Batista joined Foz do Iguaçu.

In April 2025, Batista joined Canadian Premier League club Vancouver FC on a one-year contract, with an option for 2026.
