= Elite Falcons FC =

Emirati football club

نادي النخبة فالكونز لكرة القدم Elite Falcons FC
- Full name: Elite Falcons Football Club
- Founded: 2022
- Ground: The Sevens Stadium
- Capacity: 4,000
- Owner: Blue Crow Sports Group
- League: UAE Second Division

Elite Falcons FC (Arabic: نادي النخبة فالكونز لكرة القدم) is an Emirati football club currently competing in the UAE Second Division.

== Ownership ==
The club is owned by Blue Crow Sports Group which owns clubs around the world including RFS, Cancún, CD Leganés, MFK Vyškov and Le Havre Athletic Club.

== Stadium ==
Elite Falcons FC plays its home matches at the 4,000-seat The Sevens Stadium in Dubai.

== History ==
The club was founded in 2022 and began playing in the UAE Third Division. It earned promotion to the Second Division in their first season in the league. In the 2024–25 season, the club has won the UAE Second Division League
