= David Norman Jr. =

Canadian soccer player (born 1998)

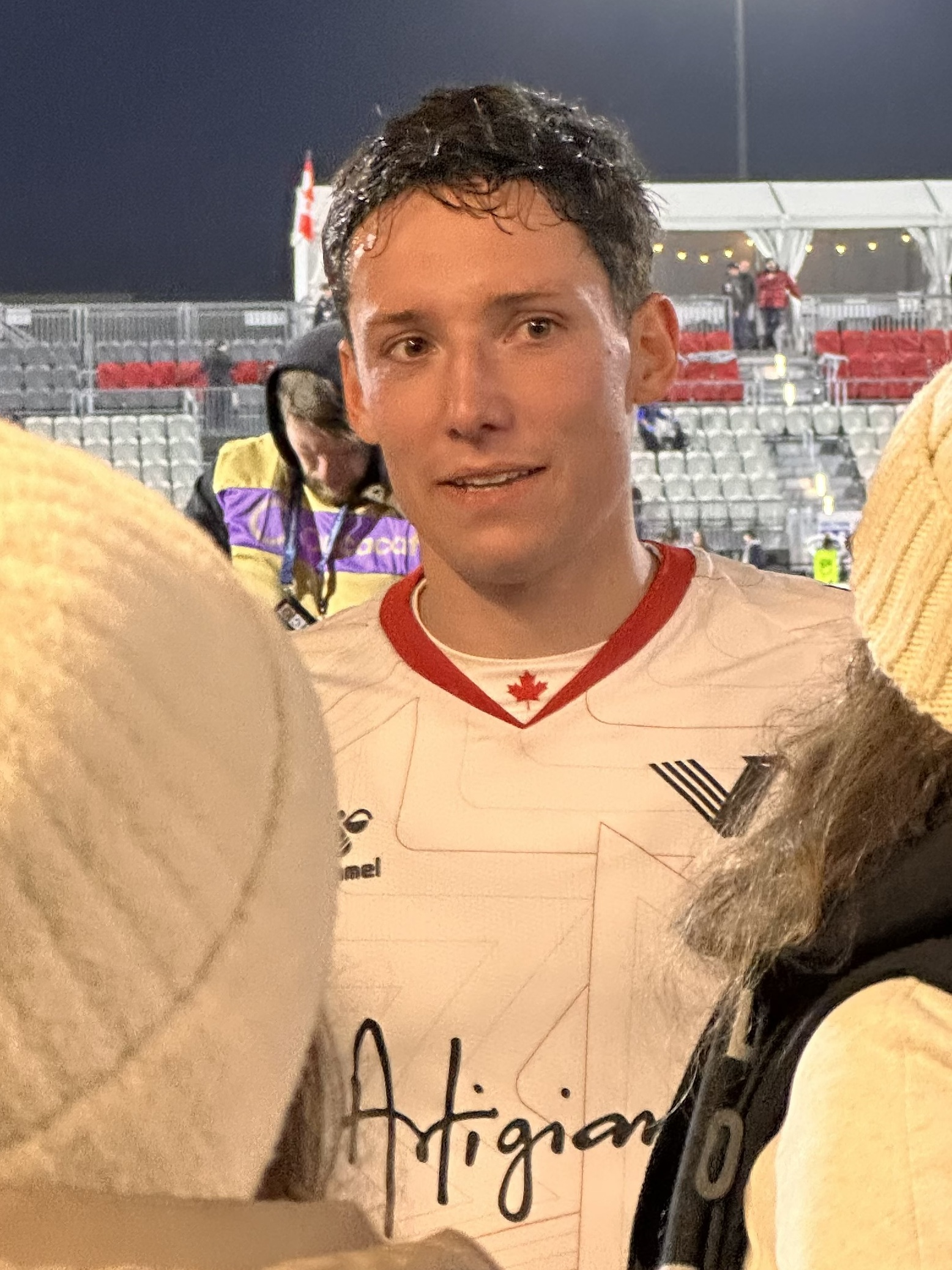
- Norman in 2026

Personal information
- Full name: David Daniel Norman
- Date of birth: May 31, 1998 (age 28)
- Place of birth: New Westminster, British Columbia, Canada
- Height: 1.88 m (6 ft 2 in)
- Position: Defender

Youth career
- Coquitlam Metro-Ford
- 2011–2012: Vancouver Whitecaps FC
- 2011: Mainz 05
- 2012–2016: Vancouver Whitecaps FC

College career
Years	Team	Apps	(Gls)
2016	Oregon State Beavers	17	(2)

Senior career*
Years	Team	Apps	(Gls)
2017	Whitecaps FC 2	26	(1)
2017	→ Vancouver Whitecaps FC (loan)	0	(0)
2018–2019	Vancouver Whitecaps FC	0	(0)
2018	→ Queen of the South (loan)	10	(0)
2019	→ Pacific FC (loan)	8	(0)
2020	Inter Miami	0	(0)
2021–2022	Cavalry FC	42	(1)
2023	Northampton Town	6	(1)
2023	St Patrick's Athletic	8	(0)
2024–2025	Vancouver FC	40	(3)
Total		140	(6)

International career^{‡}
2018	Canada U21	4	(0)
2021	Canada U23	4	(0)
- * Club domestic league appearances and goals as of October 22, 2025 ‡ National team caps and goals as of August 3, 2023

David Daniel Norman Jr. (born May 31, 1998) is a Canadian former professional soccer player who played as a defender.

== Early life ==
Norman began playing youth soccer with Coquitlam Metro-Ford SC at the age of four. Between the ages of nine and twelve, Norman was part of the Whitecaps FC Prospects program. In the summer of 2011, he trained with the academy of German club Mainz 05, before returning to Canada to join the Vancouver Whitecaps FC Academy.

In 2016, he attended Oregon State University, where he played for the men's soccer team.

== Club career ==
=== Whitecaps FC 2 ===
In January 2017, Norman signed a professional contract with Whitecaps FC 2. In May 2017, Norman was named to the Whitecaps roster for the 2017 Canadian Championship on a short-term contract. Norman would be named the player of the year for Whitecaps FC 2 upon conclusion of the 2017 season. Norman would spend one season with Whitecaps FC 2 before the club ceased operations after the 2017 season.

=== Vancouver Whitecaps FC ===
In December 2017, Norman signed an MLS contract with Vancouver Whitecaps FC for the 2018 season, with options for the 2019, 2020 and 2021 seasons.

==== Loan to Queen of the South ====
In September 2018, Norman was loaned to Scottish Championship club Queen of the South. On October 20, 2018, Norman had his first league start for the Doonhamers at East End Park versus Dunfermline Athletic in a 1–0 win. In total he played 12 first team QoS games in his loan spell comprising 1 Challenge Cup game, 10 league games and 1 Scottish Cup game. Norman departed after the league match at Palmerston versus Dunfermline on December 22, 2018.

==== Loan to Pacific FC ====
On September 3, 2019, Norman was loaned to Canadian Premier League side Pacific FC until the end of the season. He made his debut as a starter the following day in a 1–1 draw against Forge FC.

=== Inter Miami ===
On September 3, 2019, after only one appearance for the Whitecaps, Norman was traded to expansion side Inter Miami in exchange for a conditional pick in the 2022 MLS SuperDraft, effective January 2020.

Miami opted to decline his contract option following the 2020 season.

=== Cavalry FC ===
On March 2, 2021, Norman returned to Canada, signing a multi-year deal with Canadian Premier League side Cavalry FC. In January 2022, it was announced Norman would return for the 2022 season. Cavalry would announce that Norman would leave the club upon completion of the 2022 season.

=== Northampton Town ===
On March 25, 2023, Norman signed for League Two club Northampton Town on a contract until the end of the season. At the end of the season it was announced that Norman would be leaving the club.

=== St Patrick's Athletic ===
On July 1, 2023, Norman signed for League of Ireland Premier Division club St Patrick's Athletic. He made his debut for the club on July 7, 2023, in a 1–1 draw against Cork City at Richmond Park. On July 12, 2023, Norman made his first appearance in European competition in a 2–1 loss against F91 Dudelange in the first qualifying round of the UEFA Europa Conference League at the Stade Jos Nosbaum. On November 12, 2023, Norman was part of the starting XI in the 2023 FAI Cup Final, in a 3–1 win over Bohemians in front of a record breaking FAI Cup Final crowd of 43,881 at the Aviva Stadium.

=== Vancouver FC ===
On January 31, 2024, Norman signed with Canadian Premier League side Vancouver FC. In December 2025, he signed a one-year extension with the club. In February 2026, he announced his retirement.

== International career ==
In May 2018, Norman Jr. was named to Canada's under-21 squad for the 2018 Toulon Tournament. He was named to the Canadian U-23 provisional roster for the 2020 CONCACAF Men's Olympic Qualifying Championship on February 26, 2020, and was named to the final squad on March 10, 2021.

== Personal life ==
Norman Jr. is the son of Scottish-born former Canada national team player David Norman. Norman Jr. holds citizenship in both Canada and the United Kingdom.

== Career statistics ==
As of match played October 22, 2025

Appearances and goals by club, season and competition
Club	Season	League			Playoffs		National Cup		League Cup		Other		Total	
Club	Season	Division	Apps	Goals	Apps	Goals	Apps	Goals	Apps	Goals	Apps	Goals	Apps	Goals
Whitecaps FC 2	2017	USL Championship	26	1	–		–		–		–		26	1
Vancouver Whitecaps	2018	Major League Soccer	0	0	–		1	0	–		–		1	0
Vancouver Whitecaps	2019	Major League Soccer	0	0	–		0	0	–		–		0	0
Vancouver Whitecaps	Total		0	0	–		1	0	–		0	0	1	0
Queen of the South (loan)	2018–19	Scottish Championship	10	0	–		1	0	1	0	0	0	12	0
Pacific FC (loan)	2019	Canadian Premier League	8	0	–		0	0	–		–		8	0
Inter Miami	2020	Major League Soccer	0	0	0	0	–		–		–		0	0
Cavalry FC	2021	Canadian Premier League	23	1	1	0	2	0	–		–		26	1
Cavalry FC	2022	Canadian Premier League	19	0	2	0	0	0	–		–		21	0
Cavalry FC	Total		42	1	3	0	2	0	–		–		47	1
Northampton Town	2022–23	EFL League Two	6	1	–		0	0	0	0	0	0	6	1
St Patrick's Athletic	2023	LOI Premier Division	8	0	–		3	0	–		2 (Note: Appearances in the UEFA Europa Conference League)	0	13	0
Vancouver FC	2024	Canadian Premier League	17	1	–		1	0	–		–		18	1
Vancouver FC	2025	Canadian Premier League	23	2	–		6	1	–		–		29	3
Vancouver FC	Total		40	3	–		7	1	–		–		47	4
Career total			140	6	3	0	14	2	1	0	2	0	160	7

== Honours ==
Northampton Town

- League Two Third Place (Promotion): 2022–23

St Patrick's Athletic

- FAI Cup: 2023
