= Vasco Fry =

Peruvian footballer (born 2000)

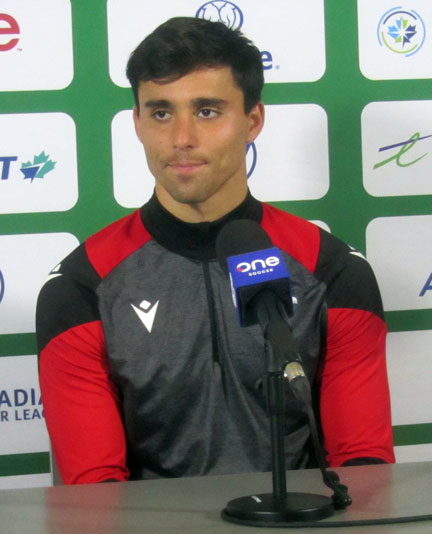
- Fry in 2025

Personal information
- Full name: Vasco Fry Conroy
- Date of birth: 30 July 2000 (age 26)
- Place of birth: Lima, Peru
- Height: 1.78 m (5 ft 10 in)
- Position: Midfielder

Youth career
- Regatas Lima
- 2015–2019: Sporting Cristal
- 2018–2019: → Vancouver Whitecaps FC (loan)
- 2019–2022: Vancouver Whitecaps FC

Senior career*
Years	Team	Apps	(Gls)
2022–2023	Whitecaps FC 2	40	(1)
2022–2023	→ Vancouver Whitecaps FC (loan)	0	(0)
2023	→ Vancouver FC (loan)	10	(1)
2024–2025	Vancouver FC	46	(4)
2026–	Regatas Lima		

International career^{‡}
2017	Peru U17	2	(0)
- * Club domestic league appearances and goals as of 19 October 2025 ‡ National team caps and goals as of 4 March 2017

Vasco Fry Conroy (born 30 July 2000) is a Peruvian professional footballer who plays for Regatas Lima.

== Early life ==
Fry played at the youth level in Peru with Regatas Lima and Sporting Cristal. In August 2018, he joined the Vancouver Whitecaps Academy, initially on a one-year loan, after moving to Canada with his family. In July 2019, he joined Whitecaps FC development squad. In 2020, he spent some time playing with FC Tigers Vancouver at the senior amateur level, before returning to the Whitecaps. He began attending the University of British Columbia, pursuing a degree in psychology, continuing his studies alongside his professional football career.

== Club career ==
In March 2022, he signed a professional contract with Whitecaps FC 2 in MLS Next Pro. He made his professional debut on March 26 against Houston Dynamo 2.

In April 2022, he signed a short-term loan with the Vancouver Whitecaps FC first team. In March 2023, he once again signed another short-term loan with the first team. He made his debut for the first team on March 15 in a 2023 CONCACAF Champions League match against Honduran club Real C.D. España. He signed another short-term loan agreement a week later.

In August 2023, he was loaned to Vancouver FC of the Canadian Premier League for the remainder of the 2023 season. He scored his first goal for the club on September 30, in a 2–1 victory over Pacific FC. After his contract with Whitecaps 2 expired, in January 2024, he signed a permanent contract with Vancouver FC through the 2025 season, with a club option for 2026. On 18 May 2024, he scored an scoring an Olympico goal in a 2–1 victory over Forge FC. In early 2026, it was confirmed that he departed the club after the 2025 season, having agreed to a mutual contract termination.

In 2026, he returned to Peru, joining Regatas Lima in the lower divisions.

== International career ==
Fry is a dual Peruvian-Canadian citizen and eligible for both national teams. In 2017, Fry played with the Peru U17 team, where he made two appearances, including one substitute appearance at the 2017 South American U-17 Championship against Paraguary U17.

== Career statistics ==
As of match played October 22, 2025

Club	Season	League			Playoffs		Domestic Cup		Continental		Total	
Club	Season	Division	Apps	Goals	Apps	Goals	Apps	Goals	Apps	Goals	Apps	Goals
Whitecaps FC 2	2022	MLS Next Pro	23	1	–		–		–		23	1
Whitecaps FC 2	2023	MLS Next Pro	17	0	–		–		–		17	0
Whitecaps FC 2	Total		40	1	0	0	0	0	0	0	40	1
Vancouver Whitecaps FC (loan)	2022	Major League Soccer	0	0	–		0	0	–		0	0
Vancouver Whitecaps FC (loan)	2023	Major League Soccer	0	0	0	0	0	0	1	0	1	0
Vancouver Whitecaps FC (loan)	Total		0	0	0	0	0	0	1	0	1	0
Vancouver FC (loan)	2023	Canadian Premier League	10	1	–		0	0	–		10	1
Vancouver FC	2024	Canadian Premier League	23	2	–		1	0	–		24	2
Vancouver FC	2025	Canadian Premier League	23	2	–		6	0	–		29	2
Vancouver FC	Total		46	4	0	0	7	0	0	0	53	4
Career total			96	6	0	0	7	0	1	0	104	6
