= Aidan O'Connor (soccer) =

American soccer player (born 2001)

Personal information
- Full name: Aidan Charles O'Connor
- Date of birth: October 7, 2001 (age 25)
- Place of birth: Grand Rapids, Michigan, U.S.
- Height: 6 ft 3 in (1.91 m)
- Position: Defender

Team information
- Current team: Loudoun United
- Number: 4

Youth career
- West Michigan Fire

College career
Years	Team	Apps	(Gls)
2020–2021	Western Michigan Broncos	22	(2)
2022–2023	Virginia Cavaliers	31	(1)

Senior career*
Years	Team	Apps	(Gls)
2024	New York Red Bulls	2	(0)
2024	→ New York Red Bulls II (loan)	24	(1)
2025	New York Red Bulls II	5	(0)
2025	→ Vancouver FC (loan)	18	(0)
2026–	Loudoun United	2	(0)
- * Club domestic league appearances and goals as of October 21, 2026

Aidan Charles O'Connor (born October 7, 2001) is an American professional soccer player who plays as a defender for USL Championship club Loudoun United.

== Early life ==
Born in Grand Rapids, Michigan, O'Connor played youth soccer with the West Michigan Fire.

O'Connor attended Forest Hills Northern High School, where he played for the boys soccer team, winning the state title in 2019 and named an All-American in 2018 and 2019. In 2019, he earned Michigan's Mr. Soccer honors, and was named the Michigan Gatorade Player of the Year in both 2018-19 and 2019-20 seasons.

== College career ==
In 2020, O'Connor began attending Western Michigan University, where he played for the men's soccer team. On August 26, 2021, he scored his first collegiate goal in a match against the Virginia Cavaliers. At the end of the 2021 season, he was named to the MAC All-Academic Team.

In 2022, he transferred to the University of Virginia to play for the men's soccer team for his junior season. On September 13, 2022, he scored his first goal for Virginia in a victory over the La Salle Explorers. After the 2022 season, he was named to the Virginia All-State Second Team and the All-ACC Academic Team. On October 31, 2023, he was named the ACC Defensive Player of the Week. At the end of the 2023 season, he was named to the Academic All-District Team and the ACC All-Academic Team.

== Club career ==
At the 2024 MLS SuperDraft, O'Connor was selected in the first round (12th overall) by the New York Red Bulls. In January 2024, he signed a one-year contract with the club with options for 2025, 2026, and 2027. O'Connor was sent on loan to MLS Next Pro side New York Red Bulls II during the 2024 season. On March 17, 2024, O'Connor made his professional debut, appearing as a starter in a 2-0 victory for New York Red Bulls II over Columbus Crew 2. On June 1, 2024, O'Connor made his first team and Major League Soccer debut, in a 1-0 victory over Orlando City SC.

In January 2025, he signed a one-year contract with New York Red Bulls II. At the end of April 2025, he was loaned to Canadian Premier League club Vancouver FC.

On January 14, 2026 O'Connor signed a two-year contract with USL Championship club Loudoun United.

== Career statistics ==
As of October 22, 2025

Appearances and goals by club, season and competition
Club	Season	League			Playoffs		National cup (Note: Includes U.S. Open Cup, Canadian Championship)		Other		Total	
Club	Season	Division	Apps	Goals	Apps	Goals	Apps	Goals	Apps	Goals	Apps	Goals
New York Red Bulls	2024	Major League Soccer	2	0	0	0	—		0	0	2	0
New York Red Bulls II	2024	MLS Next Pro	24	1	0	0	1	0	—		25	1
New York Red Bulls II	2025	MLS Next Pro	5	0	0	0	0	0	—		5	0
New York Red Bulls II	Total		29	1	0	0	1	0	—		30	1
Vancouver FC (loan)	2025	Canadian Premier League	18	0	—		6	0	—		24	0
Career total			49	1	0	0	7	0	0	0	56	1
