= T-Boy Fayia =

Liberian footballer (born 2001)

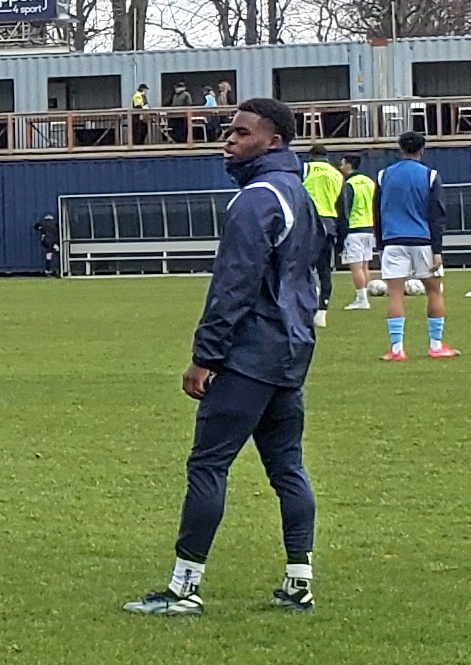
- Fayia in 2022 with FC Edmonton

Personal information
- Full name: Saah Tboy Fayia
- Date of birth: February 1, 2001 (age 25)
- Place of birth: Monrovia, Liberia
- Height: 5 ft 9 in (1.75 m)
- Position: Defender

Team information
- Current team: Edmonton Scottish

Youth career
- Edmonton Strikers SC
- Sherwood Park SA
- 2015–2019: Vancouver Whitecaps FC
- 2019–2021: FC Edmonton

College career
Years	Team	Apps	(Gls)
2023–	MacEwan Griffins	29	(1)

Senior career*
Years	Team	Apps	(Gls)
2021–2022	FC Edmonton	32	(0)
2024	St. Albert Impact	9	(0)
2025	Edmonton Scottish	0	(0)
2026–	St. Albert Impact	4	(0)
- * Club domestic league appearances and goals as of October 5 2026

Saah Tboy "T-Boy" Fayia (born February 1, 2001) is a Liberian footballer who plays as a defender for Edmonton Scottish in League1 Alberta.

== Early life ==
Fayia was born in Monrovia, Liberia, but grew up in Edmonton, Alberta. Fayia began playing youth soccer at age five with Edmonton Strikers SC. Afterwards, he played for Sherwood Park SA. In August 2015, he joined the Vancouver Whitecaps Residency program. In 2019, he moved to the academy system of FC Edmonton.

== College career ==
In 2023, Fayia began attending MacEwan University, where he played for the men's soccer team.

== Club career ==
In June 2021, Canadian Premier League club FC Edmonton announced they had signed Fayia to a contract. He made his professional debut on August 3 against Cavalry FC. In October 2021, he earned league Team of the Week honors, after a standout performance in a match against Cavalry FC, in which he earned an assist. In February 2022, Edmonton announced Fayia would be returning to the club ahead of the 2022 CPL season.

In 2023, he joined Edmonton BTB SC, who played in the 2023 League1 Alberta Exhibition Series.

In 2024, he signed with St. Albert Impact for the official debut season of League1 Alberta.

== International career ==
In 2015 and 2016, Fayia participated in U-15 identification camps for Canada.

== Personal life ==
Fayia is the cousin of former FC Edmonton player Hanson Boakai.

== Career statistics ==
As of October 5, 2026

Appearances and goals by club, season and competition
Club	Season	League			Playoffs		Domestic Cup		Other		Total	
Club	Season	Division	Apps	Goals	Apps	Goals	Apps	Goals	Apps	Goals	Apps	Goals
FC Edmonton	2021	Canadian Premier League	10	0	—		1	0	—		11	0
FC Edmonton	2022	Canadian Premier League	22	0	—		1	0	—		23	0
FC Edmonton	Total		32	0	0	0	2	0	0	0	34	0
St. Albert Impact	2024	League1 Alberta	9	0	—		—		—		9	0
Edmonton Scottish	2025	League1 Alberta	0	0	—		1	0	—		1	0
St. Albert Impact	2026	Alberta Premier League	4	0	—		—		—		4	0
Career total			45	0	0	0	1	0	2	0	48	0
