= Antony Caceres =

Canadian soccer player

Personal information
- Full name: Antony Caceres Claure
- Date of birth: January 31, 2000 (age 26)
- Place of birth: Leduc, Alberta, Canada
- Height: 1.73 m (5 ft 8 in)
- Position: Midfielder

Team information
- Current team: St. Albert Impact
- Number: 20

Youth career
- Edmonton Juventus
- FC Edmonton
- 2016–2018: Vancouver Whitecaps FC
- 2018–2019: FC Edmonton

College career
Years	Team	Apps	(Gls)
2023	MacEwan Griffins	12	(4)

Senior career*
Years	Team	Apps	(Gls)
2020–2021	FC Edmonton	18	(0)
2023	Hamilton United	6	(2)
2024	BTB SC	2	(0)
2025	St. Albert Impact	7	(2)
2026–	BTB SC	3	(0)
- * Club domestic league appearances and goals as of June 12, 2026

Antony Caceres Claure (born January 31, 2000) is a Canadian professional soccer player who plays for St. Albert Impact in League1 Alberta.

== Early life ==
Caceres began playing youth soccer with Edmonton Juventus, before joining the FC Edmonton Academy. In August 2016, he joined the Vancouver Whitecaps Academy, before returning to the FC Edmonton youth program. In the fall of 2019, he trained with the FC Edmonton first team.

== Club career ==
In March 2020, Caceres signed a professional contract with FC Edmonton in the Canadian Premier League. He made his professional debut for Edmonton on August 15 against Forge FC. He was nominated for the Assist of the Year in the 2020 season. At the end of the season, Edmonton picked up his option for the 2021 season.

In 2023, he played with Hamilton United in League1 Ontario. On July 2, he scored two goals against BVB IA Waterloo.

In 2024, he signed with BTB SC for the official debut season of League1 Alberta.

== International career ==
Caceres was born in Canada and is of Bolivian descent. In October 2014, he was called up to an identification camp for the Canada U15 team.

== Career statistics ==
As of match played June 12, 2026

Club	Season	League			Playoffs		National Cup		Other		Total	
Club	Season	Division	Apps	Goals	Apps	Goals	Apps	Goals	Apps	Goals	Apps	Goals
FC Edmonton	2020	Canadian Premier League	7	0	—		—		—		7	0
FC Edmonton	2021	Canadian Premier League	11	0	—		0	0	—		11	0
FC Edmonton	Total		18	0	0	0	0	0	0	0	18	0
Hamilton United	2023	League1 Ontario	6	2	—		—		—		6	2
Edmonton BTB SC	2024	League1 Alberta	2	0	—		—		—		2	0
St. Albert Impact	2025	League1 Alberta	7	2	—		—		—		7	2
Edmonton BTB SC	2026	Alberta Premier League	3	0	—		—		—		3	0
Career total			36	4	0	0	0	0	0	0	36	3
