= 2024 League1 Canada season =

League1 Canada
- Season: 2024

Men's soccer
- League1 Alberta: Edmonton Scottish
- League1 BC: TSS Rovers
- League1 Ontario: Scrosoppi FC
- Ligue1 Québec: FC Laval

Women's soccer
- League1 Alberta: Calgary Blizzard SC
- League1 BC: Whitecaps FC Girls Elite
- League1 Ontario: NDC Ontario
- Ligue1 Québec: CS Mont-Royal Outremont
- Inter-Provincial Championship: Whitecaps FC Girls Elite

The 2024 League1 Canada season is the third edition of League1 Canada, the 3rd division soccer in Canada. It includes league competitions from its four member leagues, and an inter-provincial championship for select teams from the women's divisions. The 2024 League1 Canada season is the first to include the men's and women's divisions of League1 Alberta.

== Men's competitions ==
=== Provincial leagues ===
League1 Alberta
League1 BC

Pos	Team	Pld	Pts
1	Edmonton Scottish (C)	12	23
2	Calgary Foothills FC	12	23
3	Calgary Blizzard SC	12	21
4	St. Albert Impact	12	21
5	Cavalry FC U21	12	15
6	Edmonton BTB SC	12	9
7	Callies United	12	7

Source: L1AB
(C) Champions

Pos	Team	Pld	Pts
1	TSS FC Rovers (C)	12	24
2	Altitude FC	12	21
3	Whitecaps FC Academy	12	19
4	Harbourside FC	12	17
5	Unity FC	12	16
6	Rivers FC	12	13
7	Burnaby FC	12	6

Source: L1BC Schedules and Standings
(C) Champions
League1 Ontario Premier
Ligue1 Québec

Pos	Team	Pld	Pts
1	Scrosoppi FC (C)	22	53
2	Vaughan Azzurri	22	49
3	Woodbridge Strikers SC	22	37
4	North Toronto Nitros	22	34
5	Simcoe County Rovers FC	22	34
6	Alliance United FC	22	30
7	Blue Devils FC	22	30
8	Burlington SC	22	29
9	Sigma FC	22	25
10	ProStars FC	22	24
11	Guelph United F.C. (R)	22	16
12	Hamilton United (R)	22	5

Source: League1 Ontario
(C) Champions; (R) Relegated
See also: L1O Championship and League2 Ontario divisions

Pos	Team	Pld	Pts
1	FC Laval (C)	20	39
2	CS Saint-Laurent	20	37
3	AS Blainville	20	30
4	CS St-Hubert	20	27
5	Royal-Sélect de Beauport	20	27
6	CF Montréal U23	20	26
7	CS Longueuil	20	24
8	CS Mont-Royal Outremont	20	23
9	Ottawa South United	20	23
10	Celtix du Haut-Richelieu	20	21
11	AS Laval	20	20

Source: Spordle
(C) Champions
See also: Reserve Division

== Women's competitions ==
=== Provincial leagues ===
League1 Alberta
League1 BC
League1 Ontario

Pos	Team	Pld	Pts
1	Calgary Blizzard SC (C)	12	23
2	Callies United	12	18
3	ASA High Performance	12	18
4	Edmonton BTB SC	12	17
5	Calgary Foothills WFC	12	16
6	Edmonton Scottish	12	15
7	St. Albert Impact	12	14

Source: L1AB
(C) Champions

Pos	Team	Pld	Pts
1	Whitecaps FC Girls Elite (C)	12	32
2	Unity FC	12	23
3	Burnaby FC	12	20
4	TSS FC Rovers	12	17
5	Altitude FC	12	10
6	Harbourside FC	12	8
7	Rivers FC	12	7

Source: L1BC Schedules and Standings
(C) Champions

Pos	Team	Pld	Pts
1	NDC Ontario (C)	18	46
2	FC London	18	38
3	North Toronto Nitros	18	36
4	Woodbridge Strikers	18	30
5	Vaughan Azzurri	18	25
6	Guelph United F.C.	18	24
7	Simcoe County Rovers FC	18	21
8	Alliance United FC	18	19
9	North Mississauga SC (O)	18	13
10	Blue Devils FC (R)	18	1

Source: League1 Ontario
(C) Champions; (O) Play-off winners; (R) Relegated
See also: L1O Championship and League2 Ontario divisions
Ligue1 Québec (group A)
Ligue1 Québec (group B)

Pos	Team	Pld	Pts
1	CF Montréal Academy	16	31
2	CS Mont-Royal Outremont (C)	16	29
3	FC Laval	16	28
4	Ottawa South United	16	24
5	AS Pierrefonds	16	23
6	CS St-Hubert	16	4

Source: Spordle
(C) Champions
See also: L1Q reserve division

Pos	Team	Pld	Pts
1	A.S. Blainville	16	34
2	Royal-Sélect de Beauport	16	29
3	Celtix du Haut-Richelieu	16	26
4	CS Longueuil	16	19
5	AS Laval	16	17
6	Rapides de Chaudière-Ouest	16	8

Source: Spordle

=== Inter-Provincial Championship ===
2024 Inter-Provincial Championship
Tournament details
- Venue(s): Tim Hortons Field, Hamilton, Ontario
- Dates: August 9–11
- Teams: 4

Final positions
- Champions: (British Columbia) Whitecaps FC Girls Elite (2nd title)

Tournament statistics
- Matches played: 4
- Goals scored: 9 (2.25 per match)

The 2024 Women's Inter-Provincial Championship was held on August 9 and 11 at Tim Hortons Field in Hamilton, Ontario. The winner qualified for the 2025–26 CONCACAF W Champions Cup.

==== Details ====
Qualified teams
Team	Method
(Alberta) Calgary Blizzard WSC	L1AB champions
(British Columbia) Whitecaps FC Girls Elite	L1BC regular season winners
NDC Ontario	L1O champions
(Quebec) CS Mont-Royal Outremont	L1QC champions

Host
Ontario
City	Stadium(s)	Capacity
Hamilton, Ontario	Tim Hortons Field	23,218

==== Bracket ====
Semifinals
ON	NDC Ontario	1 (4)
QC	CS Mont-Royal Outremont	1 (5)
BC	Whitecaps FC Girls Elite	2
AB	Calgary Blizzard WSC	0

Championship Game
QC	CS Mont-Royal Outremont	2 (2)
BC	Whitecaps FC Girls Elite	2 (3)
Third place
ON	NDC Ontario	1
AB	Calgary Blizzard WSC	0
