= 2026 Alberta Premier League season =

2026 Alberta Premier League
Tournament details
- Country: Alberta, Canada
- Dates: May 1 – August 7
- Teams: 8 (men); 8 (women)
- Men's champions: Edmonton BTB SC
- Women's champions: Calgary Wild FC U23

The 2026 Alberta Premier League season was the third official season of the Alberta Premier League (and first since re-branding from League1 Alberta), a Division 3 men's and women's soccer league in the Canadian soccer league system and the highest level of soccer based in the Canadian province of Alberta.

== Teams ==
Team	City	Principal stadium (Note: Calgary teams did not have permanent home stadiums. Stadium that hosted majority listed.)	Men's Division	Women's Division
Calgary Blizzard SC	Calgary	Broadview Park	Participating	Participating
Calgary Foothills FC	Calgary	Broadview Park	Participating	Participating
Calgary Rangers SC	Calgary	Webber Athletic Park	Participating	Participating
Calgary Villains FC	Calgary	Villains Dome	Participating	Participating
Calgary Wild FC U23	Calgary	Macron Performance Centre	Did not enter	Participating
Callies United	Calgary	Broadview Park	Participating	Participating
Cavalry FC II	Calgary	Shouldice Athletic Park	Participating	Did not enter
Edmonton BTB SC	Edmonton	Clarke Stadium	Participating	Participating
St. Albert Impact	St. Albert	Riel Recreation Park	Participating	Participating

== Changes from 2025 ==
The league re-branded from League1 Alberta to the Alberta Premier League following the 2025 season. Edmonton Scottish departed the league after the 2025 season, although they planned to return in the future. On the women's side, Calgary Wild's team was no longer U21, and Calgary Wild FC U23 participated as a full team, after the U21s played only exhibition matches last season.

== Men's division ==
The 14-game season was played as a double round-robin, with each team playing the other seven teams once at home and once away.

=== Standings ===
Pos	Team	Pld	W	D	L	GF	GA	GD	Pts	Qualification
1	Edmonton BTB SC (C)	14	12	1	1	33	12	+21	37	2027 Canadian Championship
2	Calgary Blizzard SC	14	12	0	2	45	12	+33	36	
3	Calgary Foothills FC	14	8	2	4	41	17	+24	26	
4	Cavalry FC II	14	6	4	4	24	16	+8	22	
5	St. Albert Impact	14	6	2	6	26	29	−3	20	
6	Calgary Villains FC	14	2	2	10	13	49	−36	8	
7	Calgary Rangers SC	14	1	3	10	15	31	−16	6	
8	Callies United	14	1	2	11	11	42	−31	5	

Source: APL
Rules for classification: 1) Points between tied teams; 2) Goal difference between tied teams; 3) Goal difference in all matches; 4) Goals scored in all matches; 5) Least yellow cards; 6) Least red cards; 7) Coin toss.
(C) Champions

=== Statistics ===
Top goalscorers

Rank	Player	Club	Goals
1	Fraser Aird	Calgary Foothills FC	12
1	Marco Plenzik	Calgary Blizzard SC	12
1	Noah Lechelt	St. Albert Impact	12
1	Tristao Hein	Edmonton BTB SC	12
5	Chanan Chanda	Calgary Foothills FC	7
5	Robert Woodroffe-Brown	Calgary Foothills FC	7
5	William Omoreniye	Calgary Blizzard SC	7
8	Moe El Gandour	Calgary Blizzard SC	6
9	Emmanuel Dan-Adokiene	Calgary Foothills FC	5
9	Rilind Idrizi	Edmonton BTB SC	5
9	Shadrach Boakye	Calgary Villains FC	5

Source: APL

=== League honours ===
==== Awards ====
Award	Player	Team	Ref
Most Valuable Player	Fraser Aird	Calgary Foothills FC	
Best Goalkeeper	Stephen Bowen	Calgary Foothills FC	
Top Youth Players	Daniel Pribytov; Kyle Welch; Evan Cicoria	Cavalry FC II; Edmonton BTB SC; Calgary Villains FC	
Golden Boot (Top Scorer)	Fraser Aird; Marko Plenzik; Noah Lechelt; Tristao Hein	Calgary Foothills FC; Calgary Blizzard SC; St. Albert Impact; Edmonton BTB SC	

==== League All-Stars ====
The following players were named Alberta Premier League All-Stars for the 2026 season:

Player	Position
Stephen Bowen (Calgary Foothills FC)	Goalkeeper
Kacper Plocinski (Cavalry FC II)	Defender
Paul Amedume (Edmonton BTB SC)	Defender
David Doe (Edmonton BTB SC)	Defender
William Omoreniye (Calgary Blizzard SC)	Defender
Marko Plenzik (Calgary Blizzard SC)	Midfielder
James Greco-Taylor (Calgary Blizzard SC)	Midfielder
Fraser Aird (Calgary Foothills FC)	Midfielder
Rilind Idrizi (Edmonton BTB SC)	Midfielder
Tristao Hein (Edmonton BTB SC)	Forward
Noah Lechelt (St. Albert Impact)	Forward
Kondeh Mansaray (Edmonton BTB SC)	Head Coach

== Women's division ==
The 14-game season was played as a double round-robin, with each team playing the other seven teams once at home and once away.

=== Standings ===
Pos	Team	Pld	W	D	L	GF	GA	GD	Pts
1	Calgary Wild FC U23 (C)	14	11	1	2	55	14	+41	34
2	Calgary Foothills FC	14	8	3	3	30	16	+14	27
3	Calgary Blizzard SC	14	8	3	3	32	19	+13	27
4	Edmonton BTB SC	14	7	4	3	33	17	+16	25
5	St. Albert Impact	14	6	5	3	32	15	+17	23
6	Calgary Rangers SC	14	2	4	8	14	37	−23	10
7	Calgary Villains FC	14	3	0	11	24	33	−9	9
8	Callies United	14	1	0	13	7	76	−69	3

Source: APL
Rules for classification: 1) Points between tied teams; 2) Goal difference between tied teams; 3) Goal difference in all matches; 4) Goals scored in all matches; 5) Least yellow cards; 6) Least red cards; 7) Coin toss.
(C) Champions

=== Statistics ===
Top goalscorers

Rank	Player	Club	Goals
1	Avril Jamieson	Calgary Foothills WFC	9
1	Mykena Walker	Calgary Blizzard SC	9
1	Ojong Tabot	Calgary Wild FC U23	9
4	Ayana Reid Garvey	Calgary Wild FC U23	6
4	Emma Nicholson	Calgary Foothills WFC	6
4	Gabrielle Linford	Edmonton BTB SC	6
4	Isabelle Lachance	Calgary Villains FC	6
4	Maiya Emberly	Calgary Wild FC U23	6
4	Makeena van der Veen	Edmonton BTB SC	6
10	Hanna Hassan	Edmonton BTB SC	5
10	Raegan McCarthy	St. Albert Impact	5
10	Samantha Bouchard	Edmonton BTB SC	5
10	Shaden Al-Asad	Calgary Wild FC U23	5
10	Tamara Djurisic	Edmonton BTB SC	5

Source: APL

=== League honours ===
==== Awards ====
Award	Player	Team	Ref
Most Valuable Player	Ojong Tabot	Calgary Wild FC U23	
Best Goalkeeper	Sienna Szysky	Calgary Wild FC U23	
Top Youth Players	Maiya Emberly; Elise Hornick; Ava Beuk	Calgary Wild FC U23; Calgary Foothills WFC; Calgary Rangers SC	
Golden Boot (Top Scorer)	Avril Jamieson; Mykena Walker; Ojong Tabot	Calgary Foothills WFC; Calgary Blizzard SC; Calgary Wild FC U23	

==== League All-Stars ====
The following players were named Alberta Premier League All-Stars for the 2026 season:

Player	Position
Sienna Szysky (Calgary Wild FC U23)	Goalkeeper
Haden Thomas (Edmonton BTB SC)	Defender
Clara Monck (Calgary Wild FC U23)	Defender
Jamie Erickson (St. Albert impact)	Defender
Mykena Walker (Calgary Blizzard SC)	Defender
Aislin Phillips (Calgary Blizzard SC)	Midfielder
Samantha Bouchard (Edmonton BTB SC)	Midfielder
Shaden Al-Asad (Calgary Wild FC U23)	Midfielder
Grace Mwasalla (Calgary Foothills WFC)	Forward
Avril Jamieson (Calgary Foothills WFC)	Forward
Ojong Tabot (Calgary Wild FC U23)	Forward
Kennedi Kiarash (Calgary Wild FC U23)	Head Coach
