= 2024 in Canadian soccer =

Soccer in Canada
- Season: 2024

Men's soccer
- CPL Championship: Cavalry FC
- CPL Shield: Forge FC
- MLS Cup: (United States) LA Galaxy (Note: Vancouver Whitecaps FC was the best Canadian club in the MLS Cup playoffs.)
- Supporters' Shield: (United States) Inter Miami CF (Note: Vancouver Whitecaps FC was the best Canadian club in the Supporters' Shield standings.)
- League1 Canada: List of champions: AB: Edmonton Scottish; BC: TSS FC Rovers; ON: Scrosoppi FC; QC: FC Laval
- Canadian Championship: Vancouver Whitecaps FC
- Challenge Trophy: Gloucester Celtic FC

Women's soccer
- League1 Canada: List of champions: AB: Calgary Blizzard SC; BC: Whitecaps FC Girls Elite; ON: NDC Ontario; QC: CS Mont-Royal Outremont
- Inter-provincial Championship: Whitecaps FC Girls Elite
- Jubilee Trophy: CS Trident

The following are events related to Canadian soccer in the year 2024.

== National teams ==
=== Men’s ===
==== Senior ====
The Canada men's national soccer team will complete in 2024–25 CONCACAF Nations League and 2024 Copa América play-in match.

As of November 20, 2024:

Wins	Losses	Draws
6	3	5

===== Friendlies =====
June 6	Netherlands	4–0	Canada	Rotterdam, Netherlands
20:45 (UTC+2)	Depay 50'; Frimpong 57'; Weghorst 63'; Van Dijk 83'	Report		Stadium: De Kuip; Referee: Rohit Saggi (Norway)

June 9	France	0–0	Canada	Bordeaux, France
21:15 (UTC+2)		Report		Stadium: Malmut Atlantique; Attendance: 40,835; Referee: Fábio Veríssimo (Portugal)

September 7	United States	1–2	Canada	Kansas City, United States
15:00 (UTC-5)	De la Torre 66'	Report	Shaffelburg 17'; David 58'	Stadium: Children's Mercy Park; Attendance: 10,523; Referee: Keylor Herrera (Costa Rica)

September 10	Mexico	0–0	Canada	Arlington, United States
20:00 (UTC-5)		Report		Stadium: AT&T Stadium; Attendance: 32,623; Referee: Victor Rivas (United States)

October 15	Canada	2–1	Panama	Toronto, Ontario
19:30 (UTC-4)	Larin 44'; David 87'	Report	Fajardo 69'	Stadium: BMO Field; Attendance: 23,315; Referee: Tori Penso (United States)

===== Copa América qualifying play-offs =====
March 23	Canada	2–0	Trinidad and Tobago	Frisco, United States
16:00 ET (15:00 UTC−5)		Report		Stadium: Toyota Stadium; Referee: Marco Ortíz (Mexico)

===== 2024 Copa América =====
====== Group A ======
Pos	Team	Pld	W	D	L	GF	GA	GD	Pts	Qualification
1	Argentina	3	3	0	0	5	0	+5	9	Advance to knockout stage
2	Canada	3	1	1	1	1	2	−1	4	Advance to knockout stage
3	Chile	3	0	2	1	0	1	−1	2	
4	Peru	3	0	1	2	0	3	−3	1	

Source: CONMEBOL

June 20	Argentina	2–0	Canada	Atlanta, United States
22:00 USA (UTC−4)	Álvarez 49'; La. Martínez 88'	Report		Stadium: Mercedes-Benz Stadium; Referee: Jesús Valenzuela (Venezuela)

June 25	Peru	0–1	Canada	Kansas City, United States
17:00 UTC−5		Report		Stadium: Children's Mercy Park

June 29	Canada	0–0	Chile	Orlando, United States
20:00 UTC−4		Report		Stadium: Exploria Stadium

====== Knockout stage ======
July 5 QF	Venezuela	1–1 (3–4 p)	Canada	Arlington, United States
8:00 pm CDT (UTC−5)	Rondón 65'		Shaffelburg 13'	Stadium: AT&T Stadium
	Penalties
	Rondón (penalty scored); Herrera (penalty missed); Rincón (penalty scored); Savarino (penalty missed); Cádiz (penalty scored); Ángel (penalty missed)		(penalty scored) David; (penalty missed) Millar; (penalty scored) Bombito; (penalty missed) Eustáquio; (penalty scored) Davies; (penalty scored) Koné

July 9 SF	Argentina	2–0	Canada	East Rutherford, United States
8:00 pm EDT (UTC−4)		Report		Stadium: MetLife Stadium

July 13 3rd	Canada	2–2 (3–4 p)	Uruguay	Charlotte, United States
	Koné 22'; David 80'		Bentancur 8'; Suárez 90+2'	Stadium: Bank of America Stadium; Attendance: 24,386; Referee: Alexis Herrera (Venezuela)
	Penalties
	David (penalty scored); Bombito (penalty scored); Koné (penalty missed); Choinière (penalty scored); Davies (penalty missed)		(penalty scored) Valverde; (penalty scored) Bentancur; (penalty scored) De Arrascaeta; (penalty scored) Suárez

===== 2024–25 CONCACAF Nations League =====
====== Quarter-finals ======
Team 1	Agg.	Team 2	1st leg	2nd leg
Suriname	0–4	Canada	0–1	0–3

==== U-20 ====
As of July 30, 2024:

Wins	Losses	Draws
5	1	1

===== CONCACAF Men's U-20 Qualifiers =====
====== Group D ======
Pos	Team	Pld	W	D	L	GF	GA	GD	Pts	Qualification
1	Canada	3	3	0	0	15	0	+15	9	2024 CONCACAF U-20 Championship
2	Trinidad and Tobago (H)	3	2	0	1	8	5	+3	6	
3	Saint Vincent and the Grenadines	3	1	0	2	5	9	−4	3	
4	Dominica	3	0	0	3	2	16	−14	0	

Source: CONCACAF
(H) Hosts

February 23	Canada	8–0	Dominica	Port of Spain, Trinidad and Tobago
	Morgan 8', 36', 47'; López 26', 65'; Tavernier 27'; Kozlovskiy 87', 90+4'	Report		Stadium: Hasely Crawford Stadium; Referee: Kimbell Ward (Saint Kitts and Nevis)

February 25	Saint Vincent and the Grenadines	0–4	Canada	Port of Spain, Trinidad and Tobago
		Report	Ciccarelli 23', 54', 89' (pen.); Biello 51'	Stadium: Hasely Crawford Stadium; Referee: Okeito Nicholson (Jamaica)

February 27	Trinidad and Tobago	0–3	Canada	Port of Spain, Trinidad and Tobago
		Report	Morgan 10'; López 54'; Tavernier 79'	Stadium: Hasely Crawford Stadium; Referee: Shavin Greene (Guyana)

===== CONCACAF U-20 Championship =====
====== Group B ======
Pos	Team	Pld	W	D	L	GF	GA	GD	Pts	Qualification
1	Honduras	3	2	1	0	11	5	+6	7	Advance to knockout stage
2	Canada	3	2	1	0	5	3	+2	7	Advance to knockout stage
3	El Salvador	3	1	0	2	3	6	−3	3	
4	Dominican Republic	3	0	0	3	2	7	−5	0	

Source: CONCACAF
Rules for classification: tiebreakers

July 20	Honduras	2–2	Canada	Irapuato, Guanajuato, Mexico
	López 17'; Morgan 43'	Report		Stadium: Estadio Sergio León Chávez; Referee: Kwinsi Williams (Trinidad and Tobago)

July 23	Canada	1–0	Dominican Republic	Irapuato, Guanajuato, Mexico
	Ciccarelli 86'	Report		Stadium: Estadio Sergio León Chávez; Referee: David Gómez (Costa Rica)

July 26	El Salvador	1–2	Canada	Irapuato, Guanajuato, Mexico
	Castillo 77'	Report	López 21'; Bunbury 90+3'	Stadium: Estadio Sergio León Chávez; Referee: Fernando Morón (Panama)

====== Knockout stage ======
July 30 QF	Panama	2–1 (a.e.t.)	Canada	León, Mexico
20:06 CST (UTC−6)	Mosquera 68' (pen.); Modelo 95'	Report	López 78'	Stadium: Estadio Nou Camp; Referee: Hakeem Harvey (Saint Kitts and Nevis)

=== Women’s ===
==== Senior ====
The Canada women's national soccer team are competing in 2024 CONCACAF W Gold Cup and will compete in the 2024 Olympics.

As of November 29, 2024.

Wins	Losses	Draws
11	0	6

===== Friendlies =====
June 1	Canada	2–0	Mexico	Montréal, Québec
	Leon 73'; Lacasse 86'	Report		Stadium: Stade Saputo; Referee: Alyssa Nichols (United States)

June 4	Canada	1–1	Mexico	Toronto, Ontario
	Buchanan 48'	Report	Ovalle 70'	Stadium: BMO Field; Attendance: 18,805; Referee: Marianela Araya (Costa Rica)

July 13	Australia	1–2	Canada	Marbella, Spain
21:00 UTC+02:00		Source		Attendance: 0 (behind closed doors)

July 17	Nigeria	0–1	Canada

October 25	Spain	1–1	Canada	Almendralejo, Spain
4:00PM ET		Report		Stadium: Estadio Francisco de la Hera

November 29	Canada	0–0	Iceland	Murcia, Spain
1:00PM ET		Report		Stadium: Pinatar Arena; Referee: Zuzana Valentová (Slovakia)

December 3	Canada	5–1	South Korea	San Pedro del Pinatar, Spain
12:00PM ET	Seon-joo 22' (o.g.); Alidou 52'; Smith 58'; Gilles 78'; Leon 90+2'	Report	Hyo-kyeong 76'	Stadium: Pinatar Arena; Attendance: 25; Referee: Zuzana Valentová (Slovakia)

===== CONCACAF W Gold Cup =====
====== Group C ======
Pos	Team	Pld	W	D	L	GF	GA	GD	Pts	Qualification
1	Canada	3	3	0	0	13	0	+13	9	Advance to knockout stage
2	Paraguay	3	2	0	1	4	6	−2	6	Advance to knockout stage
3	Costa Rica	3	1	0	2	2	4	−2	3	Advance to knockout stage
4	El Salvador	3	0	0	3	2	11	−9	0	

Source: CONCACAF
Rules for classification: Tiebreakers

February 22	Canada	6–0	El Salvador	Houston, United States
21:00 ET	Lacasse 3'; Huitema 24'; Leon 28', 59' (pen.); Buchanan 62'; Smith 86'	Report		Stadium: Shell Energy Stadium; Referee: Melissa Borjas (Honduras)

February 25	Paraguay	0–4	Canada	Houston, United States
17:00 ET		Report	Leon 25', 49', 57'; Smith 39'	Stadium: Shell Energy Stadium; Referee: Katia García (Mexico)

February 28	Canada	3–0	Costa Rica	Houston, United States
18:00 ET	Huitema 11'; Zadorsky 27', 57'	Report		Stadium: Shell Energy Stadium; Referee: Tori Penso (United States)

====== Knockout Stage ======
March 2 QF	Canada	1–0 (a.e.t.)	Costa Rica	Los Angeles, United States
19:00 ET	Viens 104'	Report		Stadium: BMO Stadium; Referee: Odette Hamilton (Jamaica)

March 6 SF	Canada	2–2 (a.e.t.) (1–3 p)	United States	San Diego, United States
19:00 ET	Huitema 82'; Leon 120+7' (pen.)	Report	Shaw 20'; Smith 99'	Stadium: Snapdragon Stadium; Referee: Katia García (Mexico)
	Penalties
	Leon (penalty missed); Huitema (penalty missed); Quinn (penalty scored); Fleming (penalty missed)		(penalty scored) Smith; (penalty missed) Albert; (penalty scored) Naeher; (penalty scored) Horan

===== SheBelieves Cup =====
Semi-finals
April 6 – Atlanta, Georgia
United States	2
Japan	1
April 6 – Atlanta, Georgia
Brazil	1 (2)
Canada (p)	1 (4)

Final
April 9 – Columbus, Ohio
United States (p)	2 (5)
Canada	2 (4)
Third place
April 9 – Columbus, Ohio
Japan	1 (0)
Brazil (p)	1 (3)

April 6 SF	Canada	1–1 (4–2 p)	Brazil	Atlanta, United States
15:30 ET	Gilles 77'	Report	Tarciane 22' (pen.)	Stadium: Mercedes-Benz Stadium; Referee: Tori Penso (United States)
	Penalties
	Lawrence (penalty missed); Leon (penalty scored); J. Rose (penalty scored); Awujo (penalty scored); Grosso (penalty scored)		(penalty missed) Marta; (penalty scored) Cristiane; (penalty missed) Antônia; (penalty scored) Tarciane

April 9 F	United States	2–2 (5–4 p)	Canada	Columbus, United States
	Smith 50', 68'	Report	Leon 40', 86' (pen.)	Stadium: Lower.com Field; Attendance: 19,049; Referee: Crystal Sobers (Trinidad and Tobago)
	Penalties
	Rodman (penalty missed); Smith (penalty scored); Naeher (penalty scored); Horan (penalty scored); Sonnett (penalty missed); Dahlkemper (penalty scored); Fox (penalty scored)		(penalty scored) Fleming; (penalty scored) Leon; (penalty missed) Rose; (penalty missed) Lacasse; (penalty scored) Grosso; (penalty scored) Lawrence; (penalty missed) Viens

===== 2024 Summer Olympics =====
====== Group A ======
Pos	Team	Pld	W	D	L	GF	GA	GD	Pts	Qualification
1	France (H)	3	2	0	1	6	5	+1	6	Advance to knockout stage
2	Canada	3	3	0	0	5	2	+3	3 (Note: On 27 July 2024, Canada was penalized 6 points by FIFA for their coaching staff's involvement in illegal drone spying at an official training venue. The decision was upheld by CAS on 31 July.)	Advance to knockout stage
3	Colombia	3	1	0	2	4	4	0	3	Advance to knockout stage
4	New Zealand	3	0	0	3	2	6	−4	0	

Source: FIFA
(H) Hosts
Notes:

July 25	Canada	2–1	New Zealand	Saint-Étienne, France
11:00 ET	Lacasse 45+4'; Viens 79'	Report	Barry 13'	Stadium: Stade Geoffroy-Guichard; Attendance: 2,674; Referee: Tess Olofsson (Sweden

July 28	France	1–2	Canada	Saint-Étienne, France
15:00 ET		Report		Stadium: Stade Geoffroy-Guichard; Referee: Bouchra Karboubi (Morocco)

July 31	Colombia	0–1	Canada	Nice, France
15:00 ET		Report	Gilles 61'	Stadium: Stade de Nice; Referee: Rebecca Welch (Great Britain)

====== Knockout-stage ======
August 3 QF	Canada	0–0 (a.e.t.) (2–4 p)	Germany	Marseille, France
13:00 ET		Report		Stadium: Stade de Marseille; Referee: Edina Alves Batista (Brazil)
	Penalties
	Quinn (penalty scored); Lawrence (penalty missed); Leon (penalty missed); Beckie (penalty scored)		(penalty scored) Gwinn; (penalty scored) Minge; (penalty missed) Lohmann; (penalty scored) Rauch; (penalty scored) Berger

==== U–20 ====
As of September 11, 2024:

Wins	Losses	Draws
1	2	1

===== 2024 FIFA U-20 Women's World Cup =====
====== Group B ======
Pos	Team	Pld	W	D	L	GF	GA	GD	Pts	Qualification
1	Brazil	3	3	0	0	14	0	+14	9	Knockout stage
2	France	3	1	1	1	14	6	+8	4	Knockout stage
3	Canada	3	1	1	1	12	5	+7	4	Knockout stage
4	Fiji	3	0	0	3	0	29	−29	0	

Source: FIFA
Rules for classification: Group stage tiebreakers

August 31	France	3–3	Canada	Estadio Atanasio Girardot, Medellín
15:00	Scannapiéco 8', 49'; Diaz 67'	Report	Rose 4'; Markesini 22'; Chukwu 84'	Referee: Dong Fangyu (China)

September 3	Fiji	0–9	Canada	Estadio Atanasio Girardot, Medellín
20:00		Report	Smith 7', 28'; Chukwu 24', 34', 41'; Briggs 32', 35'; Ottey 54'; McBride 67'	Referee: Shahenda El-Maghrabi (Egypt)

September 6	Canada	0–2	Brazil	Estadio El Campín, Bogotá
20:00		Report	Vendito 35'; Carol 90+9'	Referee: Maria Sole Ferrieri (Italy)

====== Knockout stage ======
September 11 R16	Spain	2–1	Canada	Estadio Pascual Guerrero, Cali
16:30	Amezaga 65'; Lloris 81'	Report	Jourde 63'	Referee: Oh Hyeon-jeong (South Korea)

==== U-17 ====
As of February 11, 2024:

Wins	Losses	Draws
3	2	0

===== 2024 CONCACAF Women's U-17 Championship =====
====== Group B ======
Pos	Team	Pld	W	D	L	GF	GA	GD	Pts	Qualification
1	United States	3	3	0	0	21	1	+20	9	Knockout stage
2	Canada	3	2	0	1	10	6	+4	6	Knockout stage
3	Panama	3	1	0	2	5	20	−15	3	
4	Puerto Rico	3	0	0	3	3	12	−9	0	

Source: CONCACAF

February 2	Canada	5–0	Puerto Rico	Toluca, Mexico
16:00 ET	Chukwu 10', 16', 24'; Tarasco 21'; Bianchin 74'	Report		Stadium: Campo 2 – FMF; Referee: Vimarest Díaz (Dominican Republic)

February 4	Panama	1–5	Canada	Toluca, Mexico
16:00 ET	Onodera 83'	Report	Hunter 9'; Martin 20'; A. Chukwu 56'; Bianchin 71'	Stadium: Campo 2 – FMF; Referee: Suleimy Linares Sáez (Cuba)

February 6	United States	5–0	Canada	Toluca, Mexico
13:00 ET		Report		Stadium: Campo 2 – FMF

====== Knockout stage ======
February 9 SF	Canada	1–2 (a.e.t.)	Mexico	Toluca, Mexico
16:00 ET	Montes 25'; Aguilar 101'	Report	Chukwu 75'	Stadium: Campo 1 – FMF; Referee: Deily Gomez (Costa Rica)

February 11 3rd	Canada	4–1	Haiti	Toluca, Mexico
	Hunter 45+3' (pen.), 46', 53'; Tarasco 51'	Report	L. Étienne 7'	Stadium: Campo 1 – FMF; Referee: Amairany García (Mexico)

== Club competitions ==
=== Men’s ===
==== Domestic leagues ====
===== Canadian Premier League =====
====== Regular season ======
Pos	Team	Pld	W	D	L	GF	GA	GD	Pts	Playoff qualification
1	Forge (S)	28	15	5	8	45	31	+14	50	First semifinal
2	Cavalry (C)	28	12	12	4	39	27	+12	48	First semifinal
3	Atlético Ottawa	28	11	11	6	42	31	+11	44	Quarterfinal
4	York United	28	11	6	11	35	36	−1	39	Play-in round
5	Pacific	28	9	7	12	27	32	−5	34	Play-in round
6	HFX Wanderers	28	7	9	12	37	43	−6	30 (Note: Head-to-head points: HFX Wanderers 7, Vancouver 4)	
7	Vancouver	28	7	9	12	29	43	−14	30	
8	Valour	28	7	7	14	31	42	−11	28	

Source: CanPL
Rules for classification: 1) Points; 2) Total number of wins; 3) Head-to-head; 4) Goal differential; 5) Goals for; 6) Away goals differential; 7) Away goals for; 8) Home goals differential; 9) Home goals for; 10) Fewest disciplinary points; 11) Most under-21 domestic player minutes; 12) Drawing of lots.
(C) Champion (qualified to Champions Cup Round one); (S) CPL Shield winner (qualified to Champions Cup Round one)

====== Playoffs ======
Bracket

Play-in round
October 23 – Toronto
4	York United	2
5	Pacific FC	0

First semifinal
October 27 – Hamilton
1	Forge FC	0
2	Cavalry FC	1
Quarterfinal
October 27 – Ottawa
3	Atlético Ottawa (p)	2 (5)
4	York United	2 (4)

Second semifinal
November 2 – Hamilton
1	Forge FC	1
3	Atlético Ottawa	0

Final
November 9 – Foothills County
2	Cavalry FC	2
1	Forge FC	1

Final

November 9
1:00 pm MST (UTC−7)

Cavalry FC	2–1	Forge FC
Warschewski 32' (pen.); Camargo 38'	Report	Achinioti-Jönsson 52'

ATCO Field, Foothills County
Attendance: 7,052
Referee: Renzo Villanueva

===== Canadian Soccer League =====
Regular season winner	Regular season runner-up
Serbian White Eagles	Scarborough SC

==== Domestic cups ====
===== Canadian Championship =====
====== Bracket ======
Preliminary round single match
Foothills County, AB
CPL	Cavalry FC	1
CPL	Vancouver FC	0
Langford, BC
CPL	Pacific FC (p)	1 (5)
L1BC	TSS FC Rovers	1 (4)
Ottawa, ON
CPL	Atlético Ottawa	7
CPL	Valour FC	0
Toronto (BMO), ON
MLS	Toronto FC	5
L1O	Simcoe County Rovers FC	0
Halifax, NS
CPL	HFX Wanderers FC	2 (3)
L1Q	CS Saint-Laurent (p)	2 (5)
Hamilton, ON
CPL	Forge FC	3
CPL	York United FC	1

Quarter-finals two-legged tie
MLS	Vancouver Whitecaps FC (a)	2	0	2
CPL	Cavalry FC	1	1	2
CPL	Pacific FC	0	2	2
CPL	Atlético Ottawa	0	1	1
MLS	Toronto FC	3	8	11
L1Q	CS Saint-Laurent	0	1	1
MLS	CF Montréal	1	1	2
CPL	Forge FC	1	2	3

Semi-finals two-legged tie
MLS	Vancouver Whitecaps FC	1	1	2
CPL	Pacific FC	0	0	0
MLS	Toronto FC (a)	1	1	2
CPL	Forge FC	2	0	2

Final single match
Vancouver, BC
MLS	Vancouver Whitecaps FC (p)	0 (4)
MLS	Toronto FC	0 (2)

====== Final ======
September 25, 2024
7:00 pm PDT

Vancouver Whitecaps FC	0–0	Toronto FC
	Report
Penalties
Gauld (penalty scored); Armstrong (penalty missed); Berhalter (penalty scored); White (penalty scored); Utvik (penalty scored)	4–2	(penalty scored) Owusu; (penalty missed) Longstaff; (penalty missed) Thompson; (penalty scored) Osorio

BC Place, Vancouver, British Columbia
Attendance: 12,516
Referee: Marie-Soleil Beaudoin

===== Major League Soccer =====
====== Regular season ======
Overall MLS standings table
Pos	Team	Pld	W	L	T	GF	GA	GD	Pts	Qualification
1	Inter Miami CF (S)	34	22	4	8	79	49	+30	74	Qualification for the FIFA Club World Cup group stage and the CONCACAF Champions Cup round one (Note: As 2024 MLS Supporters' Shield champions)
2	Columbus Crew (L)	34	19	6	9	72	40	+32	66	Qualification for the CONCACAF Champions Cup round of 16 (Note: As winners of Leagues Cup)
3	Los Angeles FC (U)	34	19	8	7	63	43	+20	64	Qualification for the CONCACAF Champions Cup round one (Note: As runners-up of Leagues Cup)
4	LA Galaxy (C)	34	19	8	7	69	50	+19	64	Qualification for the CONCACAF Champions Cup round of 16 (Note: As 2024 MLS Cup champions)
5	FC Cincinnati	34	18	11	5	58	48	+10	59	Qualification for the CONCACAF Champions Cup round one (Note: As highest-ranked club in 2024 MLS Supporters' Shield not already qualified)
6	Real Salt Lake	34	16	7	11	65	48	+17	59	Qualification for the CONCACAF Champions Cup round one (Note: As second highest-ranked club in 2024 MLS Supporters' Shield not already qualified)
7	Seattle Sounders FC	34	16	9	9	51	35	+16	57	Qualification for the CONCACAF Champions Cup round one (Note: As third highest-ranked club in 2024 MLS Supporters' Shield not already qualified)
8	Houston Dynamo FC	34	15	10	9	47	39	+8	54	Qualification for the U.S. Open Cup round of 32 (Note: As one of the best U.S. teams in the overall table to not qualify for the 2025 CONCACAF Champions Cup)
9	Orlando City SC	34	15	12	7	59	50	+9	52	Qualification for the U.S. Open Cup round of 32
10	Minnesota United FC	34	15	12	7	58	49	+9	52	Qualification for the U.S. Open Cup round of 32
11	Charlotte FC	34	14	11	9	46	37	+9	51	Qualification for the U.S. Open Cup round of 32
12	Colorado Rapids	34	15	14	5	61	60	+1	50	Qualification for the CONCACAF Champions Cup round one (Note: As third place of Leagues Cup)
13	New York City FC	34	14	12	8	54	49	+5	50	Qualification for the U.S. Open Cup round of 32
14	Vancouver Whitecaps FC (V)	34	13	13	8	52	49	+3	47	Qualification for the CONCACAF Champions Cup round one (Note: As winners of Canadian Championship)
15	Portland Timbers	34	12	11	11	65	56	+9	47	Qualification for the U.S. Open Cup round of 32
16	New York Red Bulls	34	11	9	14	55	50	+5	47	Qualification for the U.S. Open Cup round of 32
17	CF Montréal	34	11	13	10	48	64	−16	43	
18	Austin FC	34	11	14	9	39	48	−9	42	Qualification for the U.S. Open Cup round of 32 (Note: As one of the U.S. teams who did not qualify for the 2025 CONCACAF Champions Cup or the 2025 Leagues Cup)
19	FC Dallas	34	11	15	8	54	56	−2	41	Qualification for the U.S. Open Cup round of 32
20	Atlanta United FC	34	10	14	10	46	49	−3	40	
21	D.C. United	34	10	14	10	52	70	−18	40	Qualification for the U.S. Open Cup round of 32
22	Toronto FC	34	11	19	4	40	61	−21	37	
23	Philadelphia Union	34	9	15	10	62	55	+7	37	Qualification for the U.S. Open Cup round of 32
24	St. Louis City SC	34	8	13	13	50	63	−13	37	Qualification for the U.S. Open Cup round of 32
25	Nashville SC	34	9	16	9	38	54	−16	36	Qualification for the U.S. Open Cup round of 32
26	New England Revolution	34	9	21	4	37	74	−37	31	Qualification for the U.S. Open Cup round of 32
27	Sporting Kansas City	34	8	19	7	51	66	−15	31	Qualification for the CONCACAF Champions Cup round one (Note: Sporting Kansas City qualified as 2024 U.S. Open Cup finalists as the winners, Los Angeles FC, had already qualified via the 2024 Leagues Cup.)
28	Chicago Fire FC	34	7	18	9	40	62	−22	30	Qualification for the U.S. Open Cup round of 32
29	San Jose Earthquakes	34	6	25	3	41	78	−37	21	Qualification for the U.S. Open Cup round of 32

Source: MLS
Rules for classification: 1) points; 2) total wins; 3) total goal differential; 4) total goals scored; 5) fewer disciplinary points; 6) away goal differential; 7) away goals scored; 8) home goals differential; 9) home goals scored; 10) coin toss (2 clubs tied) or drawing of lots (≥3 clubs tied)
(C) MLS Cup champions; (L) Leagues Cup winners; (S) Supporters' Shield winners; (U) U.S. Open Cup winners; (V) Canadian Championship winners

====== MLS Cup Playoffs ======
Wild Card

Home team	Score	Away team
CF Montréal	2–2 (4–5 p)	Atlanta United FC
Portland Timbers	0–5	Vancouver Whitecaps FC

Round one

Team 1	Series	Team 2	Game 1	Game 2	Game 3
Los Angeles FC	2–1	Vancouver Whitecaps FC	2–1	0–3	1–0

==== International leagues/cups ====
===== CONCACAF Champions Cup =====
Cavalry FC, Forge FC, and Vancouver Whitecaps FC are competing in 2024 CONCACAF Champions Cup.

====== Round One ======
Team 1	Agg.	Team 2	1st leg	2nd leg
Forge FC (Canada)	2–5	(Mexico) Guadalajara	1–3	1–2
Vancouver Whitecaps FC (Canada)	1–4	(Mexico) UANL	1–1	0–3
Cavalry FC (Canada)	1–6	(United States) Orlando City SC	0–3	1–3

===== Leagues Cup =====
====== Group Stage ======
East

East 2

Pos	Team	Pld	Pts
1	(United States Soccer Federation) Orlando City SC	2	5
2	(Canadian Soccer Association) CF Montréal	2	3
3	(Mexican Football Federation) Atlético San Luis	2	1

Source: Leagues Cup
East 6

Pos	Team	Pld	Pts
1	(Canadian Soccer Association) Toronto FC	2	5
2	(Mexican Football Federation) Pachuca	2	2
3	(United States Soccer Federation) New York Red Bulls	2	2

Source: Leagues Cup

West

West 7

Pos	Team	Pld	Pts
1	(Canadian Soccer Association) Vancouver Whitecaps FC	2	5
2	(United States Soccer Federation) Los Angeles FC	2	4
3	(Mexican Football Federation) Tijuana	2	0

Source: Leagues Cup

====== Knockout Stage ======
Round of 32

Team 1	Score	Team 2
Vancouver Whitecaps FC (Canada)	0–2	(Mexico) UNAM
Inter Miami CF (United States)	4–3	(Canada) Toronto FC
Philadelphia Union (United States)	2–0	(Canada) CF Montréal

=== Women’s ===
==== CONCACAF competitions ====
===== 2024–25 CONCACAF W Champions Cup =====
====== Group B ======
Pos	Team	Pld	W	D	L	GF	GA	GD	Pts	Qualification	AME	POR	SDW	WFC	SFE
1	(Mexico) América	4	3	0	1	14	3	+11	9	Advance to knockout stage	—	—	—	7–0	5–0
2	(United States) Portland Thorns	4	3	0	1	13	5	+8	9	Advance to knockout stage	3–1	—	—	—	2–1
3	(United States) San Diego Wave	4	3	0	1	7	3	+4	9		0–1	3–2	—	—	—
4	(Canada) Whitecaps Girls Elite	4	1	0	3	2	16	−14	3		—	0–6	0–2	—	—
5	(Panama) Santa Fe	4	0	0	4	2	11	−9	0		—	—	0–2	1–2	—

Source: CONCACAF
Rules for classification: Tiebreakers
