= Marcus Simmons (footballer) =

Guyanese footballer (born 2000)

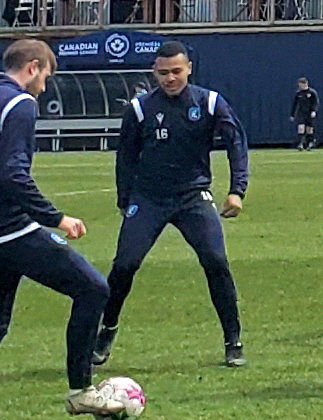
- Simmons in 2022 with FC Edmonton

Personal information
- Full name: Kapri Marcus Douglas Simmons
- Date of birth: July 16, 2000 (age 26)
- Place of birth: Edmonton, Alberta, Canada
- Height: 1.80 m (5 ft 11 in)
- Position: Forward

Team information
- Current team: Edmonton Scottish

Youth career
- Edmonton Green & Gold
- FC Edmonton

College career
Years	Team	Apps	(Gls)
2018–2019	MacEwan Griffins	23	(1)
2021	York Lions	12	(1)

Senior career*
Years	Team	Apps	(Gls)
2022	FC Edmonton	24	(0)
2023	Vancouver FC	5	(0)
2023	Valletta	0	(0)
2025–	Edmonton Scottish	2	(0)

International career^{‡}
2023–	Guyana	1	(0)
- * Club domestic league appearances and goals as of June 17, 2025 ‡ National team caps and goals as of November 21, 2023

Kapri Marcus Douglas Simmons (born July 16, 2000) is a footballer who plays for League1 Alberta club Edmonton Scottish. Born in Canada, he represents Guyana at international level.

== Early career ==
Simmons played youth soccer with Edmonton Green & Gold, and was later a part of the FC Edmonton academy. He won a silver medal with Team Alberta at the 2017 Canada Summer Games.

In the offseason of 2021, Simmons played with amateur club Edmonton Scottish and participated in the 2021 Summer Series and AMSL, notably scoring a 1st-minute goal against Calgary Foothills in the home opener.

== University career ==
In 2018, he began attending MacEwan University, playing for the men's soccer team. He made his debut for MacEwan on September 8, 2018, earning an assist on the game-winning goal against the Mount Royal Cougars. He scored his first goal exactly a year later on September 8, 2019, also against the Mount Royal Cougars. He played two seasons with the Griffins, scoring once and adding three assists in 23 appearances.

Following a summer stint with Edmonton Scottish, he transferred to York University and began playing for the York Lions in 2021. He appeared in nine season games, scoring once, along with appearing in the all three of the team's playoff matches for the Lions, helping them to an OUA silver medal.

== Club career ==
After impressing in his pre-season trial, Simmons signed a professional contract with FC Edmonton of the Canadian Premier League in 2022.

In January 2023, Simmons joined Vancouver FC in the Canadian Premier League. He made his debut for Vancouver on May 19 against Forge FC.

In September 2023, he joined Valletta in the Maltese Premier League.

== International career ==
In May 2023, Simmons was invited to a Guyana national team training camp by coach Jamaal Shabazz. The next month on June 13, he was named to the final 23-man squad for the 2023 CONCACAF Gold Cup qualification tournament.
