= 2023 League1 Alberta Exhibition Series =

League1 Alberta Exhibition Series
Tournament details
- Country: Alberta, Canada
- Dates: May 12–July 28, 2023
- Teams: 10 total from 6 clubs
- Men's champions: Calgary Foothills FC
- Women's champions: Calgary Blizzard SC

The 2023 League1 Alberta Exhibition Series was an exhibition showcase season by the recently founded League1 Alberta soccer league, which is scheduled to organize its first official season in 2024.

== Format ==
League1 Alberta was launched in 2023 with an anticipated debut season in 2024. For 2023, interested clubs participated in an exhibition series as a trial run to test the feasibility of the league. Five clubs participated in each of the male and female divisions (four clubs will enter clubs in both, while two other clubs will enter a single team in one of the divisions). Each participating team played eight matches (four home and four away), facing every opponent twice between May 12 and July 24. A final was played on July 28.

== Teams ==
The following clubs are set to participate in the league.

Team	City	Principal stadium	Men's Division	Women's Division
Calgary Blizzard SC	Calgary	Broadview Park	Did not enter	Participating
Calgary Foothills FC	Calgary	Broadview Park	Participating	Participating
Cavalry FC U21	Calgary	Shouldice Athletic Park	Participating	Did not enter
Edmonton BTB SC	Edmonton	Clarke Stadium	Participating	Participating
Edmonton Scottish	Edmonton	Hamish Black Field	Participating	Participating
St. Albert Impact	St. Albert	Riel Recreation Park	Participating	Participating

== Men's standings ==
Pos	Team	Pld	W	D	L	GF	GA	GD	Pts	Qualification	CFH	STA	BTB	CAV	SCO
1	Calgary Foothills FC (C)	8	6	2	0	20	5	+15	20	Championship final	—	3–0	2–1	2–0	1–1
2	St. Albert Impact	8	3	2	3	10	14	−4	11	Championship final	1–3	—	0–3	1–1	1–1
3	Edmonton BTB SC	8	3	1	4	14	13	+1	10		2–2	2–4	—	3–0	0–1
4	Cavalry FC U21	8	2	2	4	10	17	−7	8		0–4	1–2	3–1	—	2–1
5	Edmonton Scottish	8	1	3	4	8	13	−5	6		0–3	0–1	1–2	3–3	—

Source: L1AB
(C) Champions

Championship final

July 28, 2023
7:00 PM

Calgary Foothills FC	3–0	St. Albert Impact
El Gandour 11' (pen.); Nana 41', 62'	Report

Broadview Park, Calgary, Alberta
Referee: Mazzen Black

=== Statistics ===
Top goalscorers
(regular season only)

Rank	Player	Club	Goals
1	(Canada) Habib Assem	Edmonton BTB SC	5
2	(Canada) Michael Cox	Edmonton Scottish	4
2	(Canada) Moe El Gandour	Calgary Foothills FC	4
4	(Canada) Emmanuel Dan-Adokiene	Calgary Foothills FC	3
4	(Canada) Garry Onyejelem	Calgary Foothills FC	3
4	(Canada) Kimia Kassanda	Cavalry FC U21	3
4	(Canada) Philip Masri	Edmonton BTB SC	3

Updated:July 27, 2023 Source: League1 Alberta

== Women's standings ==
Pos	Team	Pld	W	D	L	GF	GA	GD	Pts	Qualification	STA	CBL	CFH	BTB	SCO
1	St. Albert Impact	8	7	1	0	33	3	+30	22	Championship final	—	3–0	4–1	6–0	5–0
2	Calgary Blizzard SC (C)	8	5	1	2	24	5	+19	16	Championship final	0–0	—	3–0	5–0	10–0
3	Calgary Foothills WFC	8	5	0	3	25	13	+12	15		1–4	2–0	—	4–0	10–0
4	Edmonton BTB SC	8	1	0	7	7	34	−27	3		0–6	0–2	2–4	—	2–5
5	Edmonton Scottish	8	1	0	7	8	42	−34	3		1–5	0–4	0–3	2–3	—

Source: L1AB
(C) Champions

Championship final

July 28, 2023
6:00 PM

St. Albert Impact	1–1	Calgary Blizzard SC
Mwasalla 40'	Report	D'Agnone 38'
Penalties
Van Dolder (penalty scored); Mitchell (penalty scored); Martens (penalty missed); Odinga (penalty scored); Mostowich (penalty missed); Engen (penalty scored); Bretzer (penalty missed)	4–5	Barlow (penalty scored); DiGiacomo (penalty missed); Wright (penalty scored); Phillips (penalty scored); Mysko (penalty missed); Murray (penalty scored); Houghton (penalty scored)

Riel Recreation Park, St. Albert, Alberta

=== Statistics ===
Top goalscorers

Rank	Player	Club	Goals
1	(Canada) Grace Mwasalla	St. Albert Impact FC	8
2	(Canada) Alyssa D'Agnone	Calgary Blizzard SC	7
2	(Canada) Kaylee Hunter	Calgary Blizzard SC	7
4	(Canada) Kaitlyn Fraser	St. Albert Impact FC	6
5	(Canada) Sariyah Bailey	Edmonton Scottish	5

Updated:July 27, 2023 Source: League1 Alberta

== See also ==
- 2021 Summer Series
- 2023 Maritime Super Series
