= Ousman Maheshe =

Congolese footballer (born 2002)

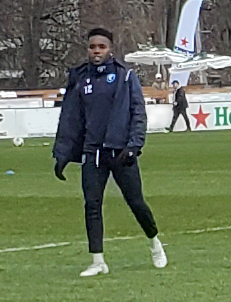
- Maheshe in 2022 with FC Edmonton

Personal information
- Date of birth: 2 April 2002 (age 24)
- Place of birth: Goma, DR Congo
- Height: 1.76 m (5 ft 9 in)
- Position: Forward

Youth career
- South Clareview Cobras
- Edmonton Xtreme FC
- Edmonton Victoria SC
- St. Albert Impact
- 2016–2020: FC Edmonton

College career
Years	Team	Apps	(Gls)
2021	NAIT Ooks	10	(18)
2022	MacEwan Griffins	10	(3)
2024	Carleton Ravens	11	(5)

Senior career*
Years	Team	Apps	(Gls)
2022	HFX Wanderers FC	0	(0)
2022	→ FC Edmonton (loan)	1	(0)
2024	St. Albert Impact	12	(9)
2025	Edmonton BTB SC	5	(1)
- * Club domestic league appearances and goals as of July 18, 2025

Ousman Maheshe (born 2 April 2002) is a Congolese professional footballer.

== Early life ==
Born in the Democratic Republic of Congo, Mahesle grew up in Edmonton, Canada. He began playing youth soccer at age four with the South Clareview Cobras, later playing with Xtreme FC, Victoria FC, and St. Albert Impact, also playing for the Alberta provincial team, where after impressing at nationals, he was selected to join a Canada U15 camp. At the age of 14, he joined the FC Edmonton Academy.

== College career ==
In 2019, he committed to attend the Northern Alberta Institute of Technology, where he would play for the men's soccer team beginning in 2020. In his first season playing for the Ooks in 2021, he scored 10 goals in six league games, to lead the Alberta Colleges Athletics Conference. He scored another eight goals in four national championship matches, helping the Ooks to a third-place finish, including a four-goal performance against the Brandon Bobcats and a hat trick the next day against St. Thomas Tommies. That year, he was named to the 2021-22 ACAC Men's Soccer All-Conference Team and a 2021 CCAA Men's Soccer Championship All-Star.

In 2022, he began attending MacEwan University, playing for the men's soccer team.

In 2024, he began attending Carleton University. At the end of the 2024 season, he was named an OUA East First Team All-Star.

== Club career ==
In 2021, he played with Edmonton Scottish in the 2021 Summer Series exhibition tournament.

On 29 March 2022, he signed a contract with HFX Wanderers FC of the Canadian Premier League, immediately being sent on loan to FC Edmonton. He made his professional debut, in a substitute appearance, on May 15 against Pacific FC. In August, he departed the club, returning to university, as part of his developmental contract.

In 2024, he played with the St. Albert Impact in League1 Alberta.

== International career ==
In November 2016, he attended a training camp with the Canada U15 team.
