= Chance Carter =

Canadian soccer player

Personal information
- Full name: Chance Ethan Ryan Carter
- Date of birth: 15 September 2001 (age 25)
- Place of birth: Edmonton, Alberta, Canada
- Height: 6 ft 0 in (1.83 m)
- Position: Midfielder

Team information
- Current team: Edmonton Scottish
- Number: 22

Youth career
- Edmonton Drillers SC
- FC Edmonton
- 2017–2019: Vancouver Whitecaps FC

College career
Years	Team	Apps	(Gls)
2021–2024	MacEwan Griffins	36	(4)

Senior career*
Years	Team	Apps	(Gls)
2020	FC Edmonton	6	(0)
2024–	Edmonton Scottish	5	(0)
- * Club domestic league appearances and goals as of July 19, 2024

Chance Ethan Ryan Carter (born September 15, 2001) is a Canadian soccer player who plays for Edmonton Scottish in League1 Alberta.

== Early life ==
Born in Canada, Carter is of Jamaican and Guyanese descent through his parents. Carter played youth soccer with the Edmonton Drillers, followed by the FC Edmonton Academy, before joining the Vancouver Whitecaps Academy in early 2017. He signed with the Whitecaps' developmental squad in June 2018, and attended pre-season camp with the first team in 2018 and 2019. He then departed the Whitecaps in the fall of 2019 and returned to Edmonton.

== University career ==
In 2021, Carter began playing for the men's soccer team at MacEwan University, where he was already enrolled as a student. He helped the team achieve their first Canada West playoff berth in his first season, however, he spent the majority of 2022 dealing with an injury that limited his playing time.

== Club career ==
In February 2020, Carter signed a professional contract with FC Edmonton of the Canadian Premier League. In his first professional season, he made six appearances, including one start, in the COVID-19 abbreviated season. In November 2020, the club picked up the option on his contract for the 2021 season. However, in June 2021, ahead of the start of the 2021 season, he announced his retirement from the professional game, to pursue other career aspirations, as he was attending university for dentistry.

In 2024, he played at the semi-professional level with Edmonton Scottish in League1 Alberta.
