= AMSL (disambiguation) =

AMSL is an acronym for "Above Mean Sea Level", the elevation of a location above a standardized sea level.

AMSL may also refer to:

- Alberta Major Soccer League, a Canadian soccer league
- Airbus Military Sociedad Limitada, a former aerospace company based in Spain
- Aéroport Montréal Saint-Hubert Longueuil, a Canadian airport
