= Alberta Major Soccer League =

- Founded: 1991
- First season: 1991 (1992 for women's)
- Country: Canada
- Confederation: CONCACAF
- Number of clubs: 8
- Relegation to: Local Tier 1 Senior Leagues
- Domestic cup(s): Challenge Trophy (men); Jubilee Trophy (women)
- League cup: Mike Traficante Challenge Cup
- Current champions: Edmonton Scottish (2024)
- Most championships: Calgary Callies (10 titles)
- Broadcaster: CFN Media

The Alberta Major Soccer League (AMSL) is the highest level of amateur soccer in Alberta. The champions of the League Cup, renamed the Mike Traficante Challenge Cup in 2008, go on to compete in the national senior men's and women's championships.

== Overview ==
Founded in 1991, the AMSL consists of two divisions, the Men's Division of eight teams and the Women's Division of eight (the Women's Division was added in 1992). Every year since the league's founding, the champions of the league have gone on to compete for the Canadian National Challenge Cup (men) and the Jubilee Trophy (women).

The AMSL is operated by the Alberta Soccer Association (ASA), the provincial governing body for soccer in Alberta. This has been at times a problematic arrangement, but it has stood up for the time that the league has been in existence. The various district associations in Calgary, Edmonton, Lethbridge and Red Deer fulfill some of the administrative functions that would normally be handled by such a league, and this has led to rules being interpreted differently for different teams in the same league. Districts other than Edmonton and Calgary can use their entire men's or woman's league program as "reserve teams". Calgary and Edmonton clubs are expected to field reserve teams in the local tier 1 senior leagues. The teams to be entered into the AMSL for the following season shall be based on previous season league results and relegation-promotion games, unless accepted as an expansion team. Teams wishing to withdraw or enter the league must notify the ASA in writing before November 15 of each year and attend the fall planning meeting on the last weekend in November.

=== Challenge Cup & Jubilee Shield ===
This competition determines the Provincial Champions and traditionally has the top 6 teams from the AMSL Standings competing. There are non-AMSL members who can challenge but this is rare, it designates the Alberta Provincial Champion and Canadian National Challenge Cup representative. With 4 of the most populous of the 18 districts having teams in the AMSL; however, the majority of the soccer players in the province are represented.

== Teams ==
Teams taking part to the 2025 Season

=== Men's division ===
- Calgary Blizzard
- Callies United
- Calgary Villains FC
- Edmonton Drillers
- Edmonton Scottish
- Lethbridge FC
- St. Albert Impact
- Edmonton Southwest United

=== Women's division ===
- Calgary Blizzard SC
- Callies United
- Calgary Foothills WFC
- Edmonton Angels Scottish
- Edmonton Drillers
- Edmonton Northwest United/Impact
- Lethbridge FC
- FC Viktoria

== Year-by-year ==
Gender	Men's			Women's		
Year	League	Cup	Challenge Trophy	League	Cup	Jubilee Trophy
1992	Edmonton Ital-Canadians	Edmonton Scottish SC	Edmonton Scottish Runners-up		Edmonton International Azzurre	Edmonton International Azzurre 3rd Place
1993	Edmonton Ital-Canadians	Edmonton Ital-Canadians	Edmonton Ital-Canadians 3rd Place	Edmonton International	Lethbridge Chargers	Lethbridge Chargers Runners-up
1994	Edmonton Scottish SC	Edmonton Ital-Canadians	Edmonton Ital-Canadians Champions	Edmonton International	Lethbridge Chargers	Lethbridge Chargers Runners-up
1995	Edmonton Victoria SC	Edmonton Ital-Canadians	Edmonton Ital-Canadians 5th Place	Edmonton Angels	Edmonton Angels	Edmonton Angels Champions
1996	Calgary Dinosaurs	Edmonton Scottish SC	Edmonton Scottish SC 7th Place	Edmonton Angels	Calgary Dinosaurs Raiders	Calgary Dinosaurs Raiders 4th Place
1997	Edmonton Victoria SC	Edmonton Ital-Canadians	Edmonton Ital-Canadians Champions	Edmonton Angels	Lethbridge Chargers	Lethbridge Chargers 3rd Place
1998	Calgary Celtic	Calgary Dinosaurs	Calgary Dinosaurs 3rd Place	Edmonton Ital Azzure	Edmonton Ital-Canadians	Edmonton International 4th Place
1999	Calgary Celtic	Calgary Celtic	Calgary Celtic Champions	Edmonton Ital Azzure	Edmonton Angels	Edmonton Angels Champions
2000	Calgary Celtic	Calgary Celtic	Calgary Celtic 4th Place	Edmonton Angels	Edmonton Angels	Edmonton Angels Champions
2001	Edmonton Victoria SC	Edmonton Victoria SC	Edmonton Victoria SC 5th Place	Calgary Dinosaurs	Edmonton Ital-Canadians	Edmonton International 3rd Place
2002	Calgary Callies	Calgary Callies	Calgary Callies 4th Place	Edmonton Victoria	Edmonton Victoria	Edmonton Victoria Runners-up
2003	Edmonton Scottish SC	Calgary Callies	Calgary Callies Champions	Calgary Saints	Edmonton Victoria	Edmonton Victoria 3rd Place
2004	Calgary Callies	Calgary Callies	Calgary Callies 9th Place	Edmonton Victoria	Edmonton Victoria	Edmonton Victoria Champions
2005	Calgary Callies	Edmonton Green & Gold	Edmonton Green & Gold Runners-up, Calgary Dinosaurs 3rd Place	Edmonton Victoria	Edmonton Victoria	Edmonton Victoria Champions
2006	Calgary Callies	Calgary Callies	Calgary Callies Runners-up	Edmonton NW United	Calgary Dinosaurs Raiders	Calgary Dinosaurs Raiders 7th Place
2007	Calgary Callies	Calgary Callies	Calgary Callies Champions	Calgary Saints	Edmonton Victoria	Edmonton Victoria 3rd Place
2008	Calgary Callies	Calgary Callies	Calgary Callies Champions	Edmonton NW United	Edmonton Angels	Edmonton NW United 5th Place
2009	Edmonton Scottish SC	Calgary Callies	Calgary Callies 4th Place	Edmonton NW United	Edmonton Victoria	Edmonton Victoria Champions
2010	Calgary Dinosaurs	Calgary Dinosaurs	Calgary Dinosaurs 5th Place	Edmonton Angels	Edmonton Victoria	Edmonton Victoria Runners-up
2011	Calgary Dinosaurs	Edmonton Green & Gold	Edmonton Green & Gold 7th Place	Edmonton Victoria	Edmonton Victoria	Edmonton Victoria 4th Place
2012	Edmonton Scottish SC	Edmonton Scottish SC	Edmonton Scottish SC Runners-up	Edmonton Victoria	Edmonton Angels	Edmonton Angels 7th Place
2013	Edmonton Scottish SC	Edmonton Scottish SC	Edmonton Scottish SC 7th Place	Edmonton Victoria	Edmonton Victoria	Edmonton Victoria Champions
2014	Lethbridge FC	Calgary Callies	Calgary Callies Runners-up	Edmonton NW United	Edmonton Victoria	Edmonton Victoria Champions
2015	Calgary Villains Elite FC	Edmonton Scottish SC	Edmonton Scottish SC Runners-up, Edmonton Green & Gold 4th Place	Edmonton NW United	Edmonton Victoria	Edmonton Victoria Champions
2016	Edmonton Scottish SC	Edmonton Scottish SC	Edmonton Scottish SC Champions, Edmonton Green & Gold 5th Place	Edmonton NW United	Edmonton NW United	Edmonton NW United 4th Place
2017	Calgary Callies	Calgary Callies	Calgary Callies 9th Place	Edmonton Victoria	Edmonton Victoria	Edmonton Victoria Champions
2018	Edmonton Green & Gold	Edmonton Scottish SC	Edmonton Scottish SC 5th Place	Edmonton NW United	Edmonton Victoria	Edmonton Victoria 5th Place
2019	Edmonton Green & Gold	Edmonton Scottish SC	Edmonton Scottish SC 4th Place	Edmonton NW United	Edmonton NW United	Edmonton NW United Runners-up

Note: In 1999 and 2000 the Calgary Callies played as Calgary Celtic SFC.

== Men's Titles ==
Club	Wins	Winning seasons
Calgary Celtic / Calgary Callies	10	1998, 1999, 2000, 2002, 2004, 2005, 2006, 2007, 2008, 2017
Edmonton Scottish SC	9	1994, 2003, 2009, 2012, 2013, 2016, 2022, 2023, 2024
Edmonton Victoria SC	3	1995, 1997, 2001
Calgary Dinosaurs	3	1996, 2010, 2011
Edmonton Ital-Canadians	2	1992, 1993
Edmonton Green & Gold	2	2018, 2019
Lethbridge FC	1	2014
Calgary Villains Elite FC	1	2015

== Women's Titles ==
Club	Wins	Winning seasons
Edmonton NW United	8	2006, 2008, 2009, 2014, 2015, 2016, 2018, 2019
Edmonton Victoria	7	2002, 2004, 2005, 2011, 2012, 2013, 2017
Edmonton Angels	5	1995, 1996, 1997, 2000, 2010
Edmonton International	2	1993, 1994
Edmonton Ital Azzure	2	1998, 1999
Calgary Saints	2	2003, 2007
Calgary Dinosaurs	1	2001

== Clubs ==
There have been a number of changes with the Alberta Soccer Association and also to the AMSL in 2011. With the addition of FC Edmonton to the Alberta soccer system their reserve team will be playing an exhibition schedule with 7 of the 8 AMSL teams.

The Calgary Dinosaurs and Edmonton Green and Gold are affiliated with the summer CIS soccer programs for the University of Calgary and University of Alberta respectively. A number of alumni typically play on these teams as well.

Clubs that have competed in the Alberta Major Soccer League

Club	Years
Edmonton Croatia Dinamo	2011 – 2015
Edmonton Drillers	2006–Present
Edmonton Green & Gold	2002? – present
Edmonton Knights of Columbus Trojans	2007–09
Edmonton Scottish	1992 – present
Edmonton Victoria	2004 – 2018
Calgary Caledonian (Callies)	1998? – present
Calgary Darts	2010
Calgary Dinosaurs	2002? – present
Calgary Villains Elite	1991 – present
Calgary PARS	2009–2011
Cavalry FC U20	2019–present
FC Edmonton Reserves	Exhibition 2011–12
FC Edmonton U20	2019
Lethbridge FC	2007? – present
Red Deer Renegades	2005–08

Source and
