= 2021 Summer Series =

Canadian soccer exhibition series

Série d'été 2021
- 2021 Summer Series Logo

Tournament details
- Country: Canada
- Dates: 26 June to 8 August
- Teams: 6

Tournament statistics
- Matches played: 8
- Goals scored: 23 (2.88 per match)
- Top goal scorer(s): Sebastian Cabrera; Erik Edwardson; Michele Paolucci (2 goals each)

The 2021 Summer Series was a series of friendly soccer matches played between six clubs from Alberta, British Columbia, and Manitoba. The eight matches were held to showcase a potential national second division within the Canadian soccer league system.

The Summer Series ran from 26 June to 8 August, 2021. All fixtures played were sanctioned by the Canadian Soccer Association.

== Teams ==
Team	Location	League	Manager
Calgary Foothills U23	Calgary, AB	USL League Two	Jay Wheeldon
Edmonton Scottish SC	Edmonton, AB	Alberta Major Soccer League	Jeff Paulus
FC Manitoba	Winnipeg, MB	USL League Two	Jose Borg
FC Tigers Vancouver	Vancouver, BC	Pacific Coast Soccer League	Colin Miller
Okanagan FC	Kelowna, BC	Pacific Coast Soccer League	Andrew Stevenson
Vancouver Whitecaps U23	Vancouver, BC	N/A (MLS reserve team)	Vanni Sartini

== Results ==
=== Matches ===
26 June 2021	Edmonton Scottish	2–1	Calgary Foothills U23	Edmonton, AB
2:00 PM UTC−7	Simmons 1'; Maheshe 79'	Report	Plenzik 56'	Stadium: Hamish Black Field

8 July 2021	Edmonton Scottish	0–2	Vancouver Whitecaps U23	Calgary, AB
7:00 PM UTC−7		Report	Brienza 70'; Camacho 81'	Stadium: Encana Field

10 July 2021	Calgary Foothills U23	0–1	Vancouver Whitecaps U23	Calgary, AB
12:00 PM UTC−7		Report	Ahmed 9'	Stadium: Encana Field

23 July 2021	FC Tigers Vancouver	2–0	Calgary Foothills U23	Kelowna, BC
7:30 PM UTC−8	Edwardson 26'; Torabi 90+6'	Report		Stadium: Apple Bowl

25 July 2021	Okanagan FC	1–2	Calgary Foothills U23	Kelowna, BC
10:00 AM UTC−8	Hutchings 60' (o.g.)	Report	McCallum 58' (o.g.); Smith-Doyle 86'	Stadium: Apple Bowl

30 July 2021	Edmonton Scottish	2–4	FC Manitoba	Edmonton, AB
7:00 PM UTC−7	Gakona 72'; Parker 90+1'	Report	Truong 32'; Paolucci 33', 45+2'; Gharahmadani 89'	Stadium: Hamish Black Field

1 August 2021	Edmonton Scottish	3–1	FC Manitoba	Edmonton, AB
11:00 AM UTC−7	Kevac 55'; Cabrera 61' (pen.), 90+7'	Report	Cabral 88'	Stadium: Hamish Black Field

8 August 2021	Vancouver Whitecaps U23	1–1	FC Tigers Vancouver	Burnaby, BC
12:00 PM UTC−8	Apostol 28'	Report	Edwardson 6'	Stadium: Swangard Stadium; Referee: Joey Ratcliffe

=== Table ===
Pos	Team	Pld	W	D	L	GF	GA	GD	Pts	PPG
1	Vancouver Whitecaps U23	3	2	1	0	4	1	+3	7	2.33
2	FC Tigers Vancouver	2	1	1	0	3	1	+2	4	2.00
3	Edmonton Scottish SC	4	2	0	2	7	8	−1	6	1.50
4	FC Manitoba	2	1	0	1	5	5	0	3	1.50
5	Calgary Foothills U23	4	1	0	3	3	6	−3	3	0.75
6	Okanagan FC	1	0	0	1	1	2	−1	0	0.00

Source: Matches

== See also ==
- 2023 League1 Alberta Exhibition Series
- 2023 Maritime Super Series
