= 2024 League1 Alberta season =

2024 League1 Alberta
Tournament details
- Country: Alberta, Canada
- Dates: May 7 – July 26, 2024
- Teams: 7 (men); 7 (women)
- Men's champions: Edmonton Scottish
- Women's champions: Calgary Blizzard SC

The 2024 League1 Alberta season is the first official season of League1 Alberta, a Division 3 men's and women's soccer league in the Canadian soccer pyramid and the highest level of soccer based in the Canadian province of Alberta.

== Format ==
In 2024, the league operated as an official League1 Canada division, after running an exhibition series in 2023. Seven clubs participated in each of the men's and women's divisions. In the men's divisions, two new clubs joined who did not participate in the 2023 Exhibition Series: Callies United and Calgary Blizzard SC (the Blizzard operated a women's team in 2023). In the women's division, two new clubs also joined: Callies United and ASA High Performance. At the end of the season, the first place team in both the men's and women's divisions were declared League1 Alberta Champions with the men's winner qualifying for the 2025 Canadian Championship and the women's winner qualifying for the League1 Canada Women's Inter-Provincial Championship.

== Teams ==
The following clubs participated in the league.

Team	City	Principal Stadium (Note: Calgary teams do not have permanent home stadiums. Stadium that hosts majority listed below.)	Men's Division	Women's Division
Calgary Blizzard SC	Calgary	Broadview Park	Participating	Participating
Calgary Foothills FC	Calgary	Broadview Park	Participating	Participating
Callies United	Calgary	Broadview Park	Participating	Participating
Cavalry FC U21	Calgary	Shouldice Athletic Park	Participating	Did not enter
Edmonton BTB SC	Edmonton	Clarke Stadium	Participating	Participating
Edmonton Scottish	Edmonton	Hamish Black Field	Participating	Participating
ASA High Performance	Calgary	Macron Performance Centre - Foothills	Did not enter	Participating
St. Albert Impact	St. Albert	Riel Recreation Park	Participating	Participating

== Men's division ==
=== Standings ===
Pos	Team	Pld	W	D	L	GF	GA	GD	Pts	Qualification
1	Edmonton Scottish (C)	12	7	2	3	22	17	+5	23	Qualified for 2025 Canadian Championship and League1 Alberta Championship Final
2	Calgary Foothills FC	12	7	2	3	22	12	+10	23	League1 Alberta Championship Final
3	Calgary Blizzard SC	12	7	0	5	27	18	+9	21	
4	St. Albert Impact	12	6	3	3	27	18	+9	21	
5	Cavalry FC U21	12	4	3	5	19	19	0	15	
6	Edmonton BTB SC	12	2	3	7	13	22	−9	9	
7	Callies United	12	2	1	9	10	34	−24	7	

Source: L1AB
(C) Champions

Championship final

July 26, 2024
9:00 PM

Edmonton Scottish	3–1 (a.e.t.)	Calgary Foothills FC
Idrizi 4'; Habib Assem 92', 107'		Antoniuk 13'

Emerald Hills, Sherwood Park
Referee: Noel Kelly

=== Statistics ===
Top goalscorers
(does not include playoffs)

Rank	Player	Club	Goals
1	(Canada) Owen Antoniuk	Calgary Foothills FC	10
2	(Canada) Ousman Maheshe	St. Albert Impact	9
3	(Canada) Chanan Chanda	Cavalry FC U21	7
4	(Canada) Miguel De Rocha	Calgary Blizzard SC	6
5	(Canada) Josh Flaksman	Calgary Blizzard SC	5
5	(Canada) Michael Cox	Edmonton BTB SC	5
5	(Canada) Philip Masri	Edmonton Scottish	5
5	(Canada) Prince Amanda	St. Albert Impact	5
5	(Canada) Zavier Ghebrezghi	Edmonton BTB SC	5
10	3 players tied		4

Source: L1A

== Women's division ==
=== Standings ===
Pos	Team	Pld	W	D	L	GF	GA	GD	Pts	Qualification
1	Calgary Blizzard SC (C)	12	7	2	3	20	13	+7	23	2024 Inter-Provincial Championship
2	Callies United	12	5	3	4	25	21	+4	18	
3	ASA High Performance	12	6	0	6	24	22	+2	18	
4	Edmonton BTB SC	12	5	2	5	20	17	+3	17	
5	Calgary Foothills WFC	12	5	1	6	17	18	−1	16	
6	Edmonton Scottish	12	5	0	7	17	28	−11	15	
7	St. Albert Impact	12	4	2	6	17	21	−4	14 (Note: St. Albert Impact's first six games were later forfeited due to a violation of affiliate player rules. They had a record of 5–0–1 and were in first place at the time.)	

Source: L1AB
(C) Champions

=== Statistics ===
Top goalscorers
(does not include playoffs)

Rank	Player	Club	Goals
1	(Canada) Kendall Showers	Callies United	9
2	(Canada) Janai Martens	St. Albert Impact	7
2	(Canada) Taegan Stewart	ASA High Performance	7
4	(Canada) Tamara Djurisic	Edmonton BTB SC	6
5	(Canada) Makenna Van Der Veen	Edmonton BTB SC	5
6	(Canada) Aislin Phillips	Calgary Blizzard SC	4
6	(Canada) Allie Pazarka	ASA High Performance	4
6	(Canada) Alyssa D'Agnone	Calgary Blizzard SC	4
6	(Canada) Ruth Adekugbe	Calgary Foothills WFC	4
10	7 players tied		3

Source: L1A
