= Michael Cox (soccer) =

Canadian soccer player

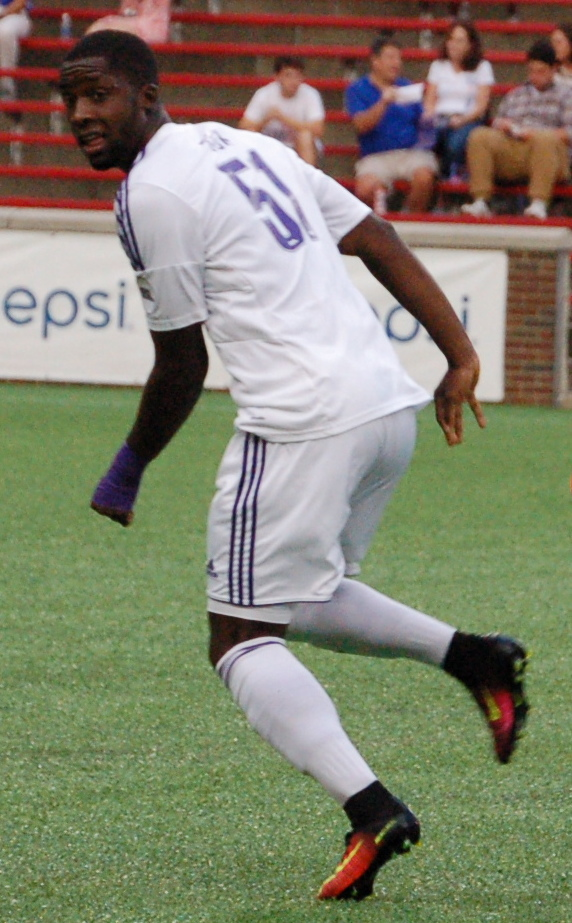
- Cox with Orlando City B in 2016

Personal information
- Date of birth: August 2, 1992 (age 34)
- Place of birth: Calgary, Alberta, Canada
- Height: 1.88 m (6 ft 2 in)
- Position: Forward

Team information
- Current team: Edmonton Scottish

Youth career
- Calgary Villains FC

College career
Years	Team	Apps	(Gls)
2015	York Lions	22	(24)

Senior career*
Years	Team	Apps	(Gls)
2010–2013	FC Edmonton	51	(9)
2014	KuFu-98	1	(0)
2014	KuPS	11	(2)
2016–2017	Orlando City B	45	(13)
2018	Nashville SC	5	(1)
2018	Saint Louis FC	11	(2)
2019	York9	5	(0)
2024	Edmonton BTB SC	8	(5)
2025–	Edmonton Scottish	0	(0)
- * Club domestic league appearances and goals as of April 29, 2025

Michael Cox (born August 2, 1992) is a Canadian soccer player who plays as a forward for Edmonton Scottish in League1 Alberta.

== Early life ==
Cox played youth soccer with Calgary Villains FC.

== University career ==
In 2015, Cox began attending York University, where he played for the men's soccer team. On August 30, he scored his first goal in a 3-2 victory over the McMaster Marauders. On October 24 and 25, he had three and four goals matches in back-to-back matches against the Algoma Thunderbirds. In November 2015, he was named the York University Athlete of the Week twice, the OUA Athlete of the Week twice, and the CIS Athlete of the Week twice, all in the same back-to-back weeks. He led the OUA and CIS in regular season scoring with 16 goals in 16 games. On November 12, he scored a hat trick in a 4-1 victory over the Cape Breton Capers in the national quarter-finals. He helped York win the OUA West and CIS title that season and was named to the OUA West First Team All-Star and the CIS Championship Tournament MVP. He was named the York Male Athlete of the Year at the end of the year.

== Club career ==
In 2010, Cox turned professional as a 17-year-old, joining FC Edmonton for their exhibition season, ahead of their official inaugural season in 2011. On June 16, 2010, he scored FC Edmonton's first-ever goal in an exhibition win over the Montreal Impact. On August 21, 2011, he scored his first official professional goals, netting a brace in a 3–0 victory over the Atlanta Silverbacks. At the end of the 2011 season, the club picked up his option for the 2012 season. He departed the club at the end of the 2013 season, upon the expiry of his contract.

In May 2014, he briefly joined Finnish Kakkonen club KuFu-98. In June 2014, he signed a short-term contract with KuPS in the Veikkausliiga. He made his debut for the team on June 10, 2014. At the end of the July 2014, he departed the club upon the expiry of his short-term deal. Afterwards, he spent time training with clubs in France and Portugal, including Atlético CP.

In January 2016, Cox signed with USL side Orlando City B. In his preseason game against the University of Central Florida, he scored a hat-trick in just 35 minutes of action. On April 9, 2016, he scored his first official goal for the club, in his first official appearance, in a match against Louisville City FC. In his first season with the club, he led the team in scoring with 11 goals. On August 26, 2017, he scored a brace in a 3-0 victory over Louisville City. At the end of the 2017 season, the club declined his option for the 2018 season.

In December 2017, Cox signed with new USL side Nashville SC ahead of their inaugural season. On March 31, 2018, Cox scored the first goal in club history, converting a penalty kick, to give the club their first ever victory, defeating Bethlehem Steel FC by a score of 1-0. He appeared in five matches with the club, before being traded.

In July 2018, he was traded to Saint Louis FC, in exchange for an international roster slot.

In February 2019, he signed with York9 FC of the Canadian Premier League. Throughout the 2019 season, Cox dealt with injury issues, limiting his playing opportunities.

In 2024, he signed with BTB SC for the official debut season of League1 Alberta.
