= Calgary Rangers SC =

Canadian soccer team

- Full name: Calgary Rangers Soccer Club
- Founded: 2001; 25 years ago
- Men's Head coach: Rory Keys
- Women's Head coach: Will Feria
- League: Alberta Premier League
- 2025: L1AB, 6th (men); L1AB, 7th (women)
- Website: https://calgaryrangers.com/
| Home colours | Away colours |

Calgary Rangers Football Club is a Canadian soccer team based in Calgary, Alberta that plays in the men's and women's divisions of the Alberta Premier League.

== History ==
Calgary Rangers FC was established as a youth soccer club in 2001. In July 2019, they were among the first 39 teams in Canada to be awarded a National Youth License by the Canadian Soccer Association. In 2025, it was announced that they club would enter men's and women's teams in League1 Alberta.

== Seasons ==
=== Men ===
| Season | League | Teams | Record | Rank | Playoffs | Ref |
|---|---|---|---|---|---|---|
| 2025 | League1 Alberta | 9 | 7–4–5 | 6th | — | |

=== Women ===
| Season | League | Teams | Record | Rank | Playoffs | Ref |
|---|---|---|---|---|---|---|
| 2025 | League1 Alberta | 8 | 4–1–9 | 7th | — | |
