= Maritime Super Series =

Soccer tournament in the Maritimes, Canada

- Sport: Association football
- First season: 2023
- Most recent season: 2024
- No. of teams: 3
- Country: Canada
- Region: The Maritimes
- Most recent champions: Suburban FC (men, 2023); Fredericton Picaroons Reds (women, 2024)

The Maritime Super Series was an annual soccer exhibition tournament contested by three teams in the Maritimes, Canada. The competition was a showcase series for a potential semi-professional League1 Canada competition for teams in the region, to be known as "League1 Atlantic".

== Format and teams ==
The series was formed in response to an interest in the formation of a potential League1 Atlantic division that would form part of League1 Canada. Three clubs, one from each Maritime province, participated in the inaugural 2023 edition of the men's and women's tournaments, which were played over three weekends and each culminated in a final. The HFX Wanderers initially intended to field teams in the 2024 edition, however, they ultimately did not.

In May 2024, it was announced that the competition would return for the 2024 season, but solely as a women's competition. Two clubs would return from 2023, while Suburban FC was replaced by United Dartmouth FC.

Team	Location	2023	2024
Suburban FC	Bedford, NS	Participating	Did not enter
Winsloe Charlottetown Royals FC	Charlottetown, PEI	Participating	Participating
Fredericton Picaroons Reds	Fredericton, NB	Participating	Participating
United Dartmouth FC	Dartmouth, NS	Did not enter	Participating

== 2023 tournaments ==
=== Men's ===
Pos	Team	Pld	W	D	L	GF	GA	GD	Pts	Qualification
1	Suburban FC (C)	6	6	0	0	22	6	+16	18	Championship final
2	Fredericton Picaroons Reds	6	2	0	4	9	18	−9	6	Championship final
3	Winsloe Charlottetown Royals FC	6	1	0	5	8	15	−7	3	

Source: Standings
(C) Champions

August 5, 2023 Final	Suburban FC	7–0	Fredericton Picaroons Reds	Halifax, Nova Scotia
21:00 ADT	Greedy 17', 35'; Waters 30', 75'; Bent 41'; Jaber 66', 88'			Stadium: Wickwire Field, Dalhousie University

=== Women's ===
Pos	Team	Pld	W	D	L	GF	GA	GD	Pts	Qualification
1	Suburban FC (C)	6	4	2	0	17	6	+11	14	Championship final
2	Winsloe Charlottetown Royals FC	6	1	3	2	11	10	+1	6	Championship final
3	Fredericton Picaroons Reds	6	1	1	4	5	17	−12	4	

Source: Standings
(C) Champions

August 5, 2023 Final	Suburban FC	4–3	Winsloe Charlottetown Royals FC	Halifax, Nova Scotia
17:15 ADT	Kennedy 16'; Longley 39', 49' (pen.), 79' (pen.)		21' (o.g.); Lepine 50'; MacIntyre 62'	Stadium: Wickwire Field, Dalhousie University

== 2024 tournament ==
=== Women's ===
Pos	Team	Pld	W	D	L	GF	GA	GD	Pts	
1	Fredericton Picaroons Reds (C)	6	5	0	1	13	6	+7	15	Champions
2	United Dartmouth FC	5	3	0	2	13	5	+8	9	
3	Winsloe Charlottetown Royals FC	5	0	0	5	3	18	−15	0	

Updated to match(es) played on July 20, 2024. Source: Standings
(C) Champions

Final	–

== See also ==
- 2021 Summer Series
