= Callies United =

Canadian soccer team

- Full name: Calgary South West United Soccer Club
- League: Alberta Premier League
- 2025: L1AB, 8th (men); L1AB, 5th (women)
- Website: https://cswusoccer.com/
Home colours	Away colours

Callies United is a Canadian soccer team based in Calgary, Alberta that plays in the men's and women's divisions of the Alberta Premier League. The team is a partnership between Calgary South West United SC and Calgary Caledonian FC.

== History ==
Calgary South West United logo

The Calgary South West United Soccer Club was founded as a youth soccer club in 2003. In July 2019, they were awarded a National Youth License by the Canadian Soccer Association. In December 2023, it was announced that they would join League1 Alberta in both the men's and women's divisions. In March 2024, they announced that they would partner with Calgary Caledonian FC to run their League1 Alberta squads, with the teams to operate under the name Callies United.

== Seasons ==
=== Men ===
Season	League	Teams	Record	Rank	Playoffs	Ref
2024	League1 Alberta	7	2–1–9	7th	did not qualify	
2025	League1 Alberta	9	4–1–11	8th	—	

=== Women ===
Season	League	Teams	Record	Rank	Playoffs	Ref
2024	League1 Alberta	7	5–3–4	2nd	—	
2025	League1 Alberta	8	4–2–8	5th	—	
