= 2025 League1 Alberta season =

2025 League1 Alberta
Tournament details
- Country: Alberta, Canada
- Dates: April 18 – August 8
- Teams: 9 (men); 9 (women)
- Men's champions: Calgary Blizzard SC (1st title)
- Women's champions: Calgary Blizzard SC (2nd title)

Tournament statistics
- Matches played: 72
- Goals scored: 292 (4.06 per match)

The 2025 League1 Alberta season was the second official season of League1 Alberta, a Division 3 men's and women's soccer league in the Canadian soccer pyramid and the highest level of soccer based in the Canadian province of Alberta.

== Teams ==
For 2025, Calgary Rangers SC and Calgary Villains FC joined the league as expansion clubs. In the women's division, ASA High Performance re-branded as Calgary Wild U21. Calgary Wild U21 will operate as a friendly-only team, with their matches not counting to the league standings.

Team	City	Principal Stadium (Note: Calgary teams do not have permanent home stadiums. Stadium that hosts majority listed below.)	Men's Division	Women's Division
Calgary Blizzard SC	Calgary	Broadview Park	Participating	Participating
Calgary Foothills FC	Calgary	Broadview Park	Participating	Participating
Calgary Rangers SC	Calgary	Webber Athletic Park	Participating	Participating
Calgary Villains FC	Calgary	Villains Dome	Participating	Participating
Calgary Wild FC U21	Calgary	Macron Performance Centre - Foothills	Did not enter	Exhibition-only
Callies United	Calgary	Broadview Park	Participating	Participating
Cavalry FC U21	Calgary	Shouldice Athletic Park	Participating	Did not enter
Edmonton BTB SC	Edmonton	Clarke Stadium	Participating	Participating
Edmonton Scottish	Edmonton	Hamish Black Field	Participating	Participating
St. Albert Impact	St. Albert	Riel Recreation Park	Participating	Participating

== Men's division ==
Each team will play home and away against every other team resulting in a 16-game regular season. The winner earns a berth in the 2026 Canadian Championship.

=== Standings ===
Pos	Team	Pld	W	D	L	GF	GA	GD	Pts	Qualification
1	Calgary Blizzard SC (C)	16	10	5	1	37	21	+16	35	Qualified for 2026 Canadian Championship
2	St. Albert Impact	16	9	3	4	48	26	+22	30	
3	Edmonton BTB SC	16	8	5	3	37	21	+16	29	
4	Calgary Foothills FC (Note: The game between Callies United and Calgary Foothills FC initially ended in a 1–4 but was later turned into a 3–0 forfeit win in favour of Callies United)	16	8	2	6	35	20	+15	26	
5	Edmonton Scottish	16	7	5	4	31	27	+4	26	
6	Calgary Rangers SC	16	7	4	5	29	24	+5	25	
7	Cavalry FC U21	16	5	3	8	27	22	+5	18	
8	Callies United	16	4	1	11	32	55	−23	13	
9	Calgary Villains FC	16	0	0	16	16	76	−60	0	

Source: L1AB
(C) Champions

=== Results table ===
Home \ Away	BTB	CAV	CBL	CFH	CRA	CSW	CVI	SCO	STA
Edmonton BTB SC		2–1	0–0	0–1	1–1	3–3	5–1	1–2	3–0
Cavalry FC U21	2–1		0–1	0–1	0–0	8–1	2–0	1–2	1–1
Calgary Blizzard SC	3–3	1–1		2–0	2–0	5–4	6–1	1–1	5–3
Calgary Foothills FC	1–1	1–0	1–2		1–1	5–0	4–0	5–0	4–6
Calgary Rangers SC	2–3	5–2	0–2	2–0		3–1	3–2	2–2	0–2
Callies United	0–4	3–2	1–3	3–0	1–3		7–2	3–4	0–7
Calgary Villains FC	3–5	1–5	1–4	0–6	1–5	0–5		0–5	3–8
Edmonton Scottish	1–2	2–0	1–1	2–5	0–2	2–0	3–0		3–3
St. Albert Impact	0–3	0–2	4–0	1–0	4–0	4–0	4–1	1–1	

Source: "League1 Men's".
Legend: Blue = home team win; Yellow = draw; Red = away team win.

=== Statistics ===
Top goalscorers

Rank	Player	Club	Goals
1	(Canada) Noah Lechelt	St. Albert Impact	18
2	(Canada) Tristao Hein	Edmonton BTB SC	14
3	(Canada) Marco Plenzik	Calgary Blizzard SC	10
4	(Canada) Habib Assem	Edmonton Scottish	9
5	(Canada) Jack Ferraro	Edmonton BTB SC	7
5	(Canada) Jamie Nicholson	Calgary Foothills FC	7
5	(Canada) Moe El Gandour	Calgary Blizzard SC	7
5	(Canada) Owen Antoniuk	Cavalry FC U21	7
5	(Canada) Rilind Idrizi	Edmonton Scottish	7
5	(Canada) Robert Woodruff-Brown	Calgary Foothills FC	7

Source: L1A

=== Awards ===
Award	Player	Team	Ref
Most Valuable Player	Noah Lechelt	St. Albert Impact	
Best Goalkeeper	Samuel Diltz	Calgary Foothills FC	
Top Youth Players	Thomas Stuber; Tristao Hein; Spencer McCallum	Cavalry FC U21; Edmonton BTB SC; Calgary Blizzard SC	
Golden Boot (Top Scorer)	Noah Lechelt	St. Albert Impact	

== Women's division ==
=== Standings ===
Pos	Team	Pld	W	D	L	GF	GA	GD	Pts	
1	Calgary Blizzard SC (C)	14	11	2	1	30	14	+16	35	Inter-Provincial Championship
2	Calgary Foothills WFC	14	11	0	3	41	7	+34	33	
3	St. Albert Impact	14	10	1	3	38	14	+24	31	
4	Edmonton BTB SC	14	5	3	6	23	21	+2	18	
5	Callies United	14	4	2	8	21	32	−11	14	
6	Calgary Villains FC	14	4	1	9	19	32	−13	13	
7	Calgary Rangers SC	14	4	1	9	14	39	−25	13	
8	Edmonton Scottish	14	1	2	11	17	44	−27	5	
9	Calgary Wild U21	0	–	–	–	–	–	—	0	Exhibition-only

Updated to match(es) played on August 1, 2025. Source: L1AB
(C) Champions

Friendly Matches vs Calgary Wild U21 (H/A)
Calgary Blizzard SC	2–0	6–0
Calgary Foothills WFC	1–0	2–0
St. Albert Impact	10–0	2–2
Edmonton BTB SC	8–1	4–1
Callies United	5–3	DNP
Calgary Villains FC	1–1	3–1
Calgary Rangers SC	4–0	1–0
Edmonton Scottish	0–0	0–4

=== Statistics ===
Top goalscorers
(does not include Exhibition Series)

Rank	Player	Club	Goals
1	(Canada) Avril Jamieson	Calgary Foothills WFC	10
2	(Canada) Isabelle Lachance	Calgary Villains FC	9
2	(Canada) Kendall Showers	Calgary Foothills WFC	9
2	(Canada) Sariyah Bailey	St. Albert Impact	9
5	(Canada) Makenna Van Der Veen	Edmonton BTB SC	8
6	(Canada) Adalyn Fairweather	St. Albert Impact	6
6	(Canada) Ally Tannas	Callies United	6
6	(Canada) Grace Moore	Calgary Blizzard SC	6
6	(Canada) Janai Martens	St. Albert Impact	6
6	(Canada) Samantha Bouchad	Edmonton BTB SC	6

Source: L1A

=== Awards ===
Award	Player	Team	Ref
Most Valuable Player	Avril Jamieson	Calgary Foothills WFC	
Best Goalkeeper	Sarah Bach	Calgary Foothills WFC	
Top Youth Players	Avril Jamieson; Adalyn Fairweather; Addison White	Calgary Foothills WFC; St. Albert Impact; Calgary Blizzard SC	
Golden Boot (Top Scorer)	Avril Jamieson	Calgary Foothills WFC	
