= Calgary Callies =

Canadian soccer club

- Full name: Calgary Caledonian Football Club
- Nickname(s): Callies
- Founded: April 26, 1904; 120 years ago
- League: Alberta Major Soccer League
Home colours	Away colours

The Calgary Caledonian Football Club, better known as the Calgary Callies, is a Canadian soccer club which currently plays in the Alberta Major Soccer League.

== History ==
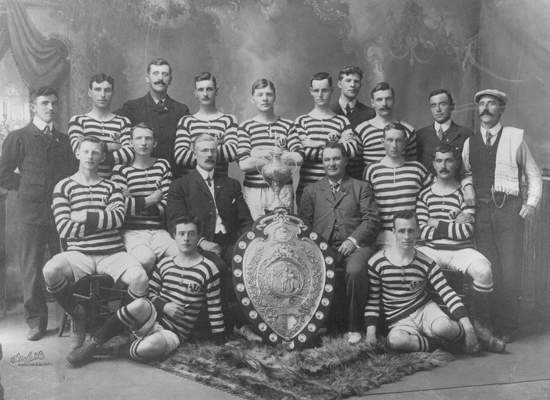
The 1907 champions, posing with the People Shield.

This club was founded on April 26, 1904. Over the years they have become a dominant club in Alberta and Canadian soccer.

In 2007, the Canadian Soccer Hall of Fame inducted the Calgary Caledonians from 1907 as a team of distinction. Calgary Caledonians were unofficial champions of Canada in 1907, 1908 and 1909 winning the People's Shield in each of those years. They won the championship of Western Canada in 1906 by beating Minnedosa 2–0 in Manitoba. The Callies great run in the People's Shield began in 1907, a year in which they dominated the Calgary League, winning 14 of the 16 games played with two being drawn. The People's Shield finals were played in Winnipeg, where the Callies beat Toronto Thistles in the semi-final and Winnipeg Brittania 1–0 in the final. The team won the championship of Alberta six times between 1908 and 1923.

The Calgary Callies played at the Canadian National Challenge Cup in 1999 and 2000 as the Calgary Celtic SFC.

In April 2008 the Callies sent senior players Chris Kooy and André Duberry to Livingston F.C. and youth player Charlie Beaulieu to Kilmarnock FC for a 2-week trial.

== Year-by-year ==
Year	League	AMSL League Table	Alberta Provincials	Canadian Nationals
1998	AMSL	1st	??	DNQ
1999	AMSL	1st	Champion	Champion
2000	AMSL	1st	Champion	4th
2001	AMSL	1st	??	DNQ
2002	AMSL	1st	3rd	4th
2003	AMSL	2nd	Champion	Champion
2004	AMSL	1st	Champion	9th
2005	AMSL	1st	5th	DNQ
2006	AMSL	1st	Champion	2nd
2007	AMSL	1st	Champion	Champion
2008	AMSL	1st	Champion	Champion
2009	AMSL	3rd	Champion	4th
2010	AMSL	7th	DNQ	DNQ
2011	AMSL	4th	Runners Up	DNQ
2012	AMSL	3rd	3rd Place	DNQ
2013	AMSL	2nd	3rd Place	DNQ
2014	AMSL	3rd	Champion	2nd

== Honours ==
- Canadian National Challenge Cup
  - Champions (4): 1907(People's Shield), 1908(People's Shield), 1909(People's Shield), (Calgary Celtic) 1999, 2003, 2007, 2008
  - Runners-up (2): 2006, 2014
  - 4th Place: 2009
  - 9th Place: 2004
- Alberta Senior Provincial Championship
  - Champions (10): 1999, 2000, 2002, 2003, 2004, 2006, 2007, 2008, 2009, 2014
  - Runners Up (1): 2011
  - 5th Place: 2005
