= Calgary Blizzard SC =

Canadian soccer team

- Full name: Calgary Blizzard Soccer Club
- Founded: 1967; 59 years ago
- Stadium: Broadview Park
- Men's Head coach: Ramon Mifflin
- Women's Head coach: Diogo Raposo
- League: Alberta Premier League
- 2025: L1AB, 1st (men); L1AB, 1st (women)
- Website: calgaryblizzard.com
| Home colours | Away colours |

Calgary Blizzard Soccer Club is a Canadian soccer team based in Calgary, Alberta that plays in the men's and women's divisions of the Alberta Premier League.

== History ==
The club was founded in 1967 with a team of 11 and 12-year-old boys, who represented the province of Alberta at an Expo 67 soccer competition in Montreal, and upon their return, they adopted the name of a defunct Canadian Junior Football team (North Hill Blizzards) and became an official club. In March 1977, the club was registered as a Society in the Province of Alberta.

In August 2019, they received the National Youth Club Licence from the Canadian Soccer Association, which recognizes the highest achieving organizations from across Canada and must adhere to a set of standards for club and player development. However, in January 2022, their national youth license was revoked due to player recruitment infractions. In June 2023, they re-obtained a National youth license.

In 2023, they joined the semi-professional League1 Alberta, operating a team in the women's division for the league's Exhibition Series. During the 2023 League1 Alberta Exhibition Series, which was run in advance of the league's formal debut in 2024, the Blizzard finished second in the regular season stage, before defeating St. Albert Impact in the championship final on penalty kicks.

For 2024, they added a men's team in League1 Alberta, enabling them to field a team in both the men's and women's divisions for the league's first official season. In 2024, the women's team won the league title, qualifying for the League1 Canada Women's Inter-Provincial Championship. In 2025, both the men's and women's teams won their respective divisions. As 2025 champions, the men's team qualified for the 2026 Canadian Championship, where they were defeated by Major League Soccer club CF Montreal in the first round.

== Seasons ==
=== Men ===
| Season | League | Teams | Record | Rank | Playoffs | Ref |
|---|---|---|---|---|---|---|
| 2024 | League1 Alberta | 7 | 7–0–5 | 3rd | did not qualify | |
| 2025 | League1 Alberta | 9 | 10–5–1 | Champions | did not qualify | |

=== Women ===
| Season | League | Teams | Record | Rank | Playoffs | Inter-Provincial Championship | Ref |
|---|---|---|---|---|---|---|---|
| 2023 | League1 Alberta Exhibition Series | 5 | 5–1–2 | 2nd | Champions | Not eligible | |
| 2024 | League1 Alberta | 7 | 7–2–3 | Champions | — | 4th | |
| 2025 | League1 Alberta | 8 | 11–2–1 | Champions | — | 3rd | |
