= St. Albert Impact =

Canadian soccer team

St. Albert Impact FC
- Full name: St. Albert Soccer Association Impact Football Club
- Stadium: Riel Recreation Park
- Women's Head Coach: Dean Cordeiro
- League: Alberta Premier League
- 2025: L1AB, 2nd(men); L1AB, 3rd (women)
- Website: https://www.stalbertsoccer.com/
Home colours

St. Albert Soccer Association Impact FC, commonly known as St. Albert Impact FC or SASA Impact FC is a Canadian soccer team based in St. Albert, Alberta that plays in the men's and women's division of the Alberta Premier League.

== History ==

The St. Albert Soccer Association was founded in 1999 as a youth soccer club. The club is one of seven Alberta clubs to be a Canadian Soccer Association (CSA) National Youth License Member.

In 2021, the club joined the US-based pro-am United Women's Soccer as an expansion franchise, becoming the league's second Canadian club after Calgary Foothills WFC. The team's budget is $100,000-$150,000 depending on travel. Their initial season was in jeopardy, after missing the deadline to be approved by the Canadian Soccer Association to apply for cross-border play, but after being given a 24 hour extension, they were able to complete their registration. For their initial season, they were to play a shortened six-game season due to the COVID-19 pandemic. In their debut match, on July 2, they defeated Calgary Foothills 1–0. The match was the first all-Canadian UWS match. Ultimately they were only able to play four of the six matches for the season.

In 2023, they joined the newly founded League1 Alberta, with teams in both the men's and women's division and would participate in the 2023 League1 Alberta Exhibition Series, ahead of the league's anticipated formal launch in 2024. During the exhibition series, the men finished second in the regular season stage, before being defeated in the championship final by the Calgary Foothills, while the women's team finished first in the regular season stage, before being defeated by the Calgary Blizzard on penalty kicks in the championship final.

== Seasons ==
Men

Season	League	Teams	Record	Rank	Playoffs	Ref
2023	League1 Alberta Exhibition Series	5	3–2–3	2nd	Finalists	
2024	League1 Alberta	7	6–3–3	4th	did not qualify	
2025	League1 Alberta	9	9–3–4	2nd	—	

Women

Season	League	Division	Teams	Record	Rank	Playoffs	Ref
2021	United Women's Soccer	West Conference	5	2–0–2	3rd	did not qualify	
2022	United Women's Soccer	West Conference	6	4–1–5	3rd	did not qualify	
2023	League1 Alberta Exhibition Series		5	7–0–1	1st	Finalists	
2024	League1 Alberta		7	4–2–6 (Note: St. Albert Impact's first six games were later forfeited due to a violation of affiliate player rules. They had a record of 5-0-1 and were in first place at the time. Their overall record would have been 10–2–0)	7th	—	
2025	League1 Alberta		8	10–1–3	3rd	—	

== Notable former players ==
The following players have either played at the professional or international level, either before or after playing for the League1 Alberta team:

- (Canada) Prince Amanda
- (Liberia) (Canada) T-Boy Fayia
- (Democratic Republic of the Congo) (Canada) Ousman Maheshe
