= Edmonton BTB SC =

Canadian soccer team (2013– )

BTB SC
- Full name: Born to Be Soccer Club
- Founded: 2013
- Stadium: Clarke Stadium; Edmonton, Alberta
- Capacity: 5,100
- Founder: Kondeh Mansaray
- Men's Head coach: Kondeh Mansaray
- Women's Head coach: Andreas Shilin
- League: Alberta Premier League
- 2026 Alberta Premier League: L1AB, 1st(men); L1AB, 4th (women)
- Website: https://www.btbsoccer.com/
Home colours

Born to Be Soccer Club is a Canadian soccer team based in Edmonton, Alberta that plays in the Alberta Premier League.

== History ==
BTB Academy was founded in 2013 by Kondeh Mansaray. Canadian national team player Alphonso Davies serves as an ambassador for the club and regularly joins the club for training and sponsors and donates equipment to the club. In 2020, BTB became an academy, with approximately 450 players. In December 2021, the club was named as a Canada Soccer Quality Soccer Provider.

In 2022, the club participated in an exhibition showcase was organized by four clubs in an entity known as Central League1. In March 2023, the club joined the League1 Alberta exhibition series. The following season, the league had its first official season.

== Seasons ==
=== Men ===
Season	League	Teams	Record	Rank	Playoffs	Ref
2023	League1 Alberta Exhibition Series	5	3–1–4	3rd	did not qualify	
2024	League1 Alberta	7	2–3–7	6th	did not qualify	
2025	League1 Alberta	9	8–5–3	3rd	—	

=== Women ===
Season	League	Teams	Record	Rank	Playoffs	Ref
2023	League1 Alberta Exhibition Series	5	1–0–7	4th	did not qualify	
2024	League1 Alberta	7	5–2–5	4th	—	
2025	League1 Alberta	8	5–3–6	4th	—	

== Notable former players ==
The following players have either played at the professional or international level, either before or after playing for the League1 Alberta team:

- (Canada) Antony Caceres
- (Canada) Michael Cox
- (Liberia) David Doe
