= MacEwan Griffins =

MacEwan University athletic teams

- University: MacEwan University
- Association: U Sports
- Conference: Canada West
- Athletic director: Joel Mrak
- Location: Edmonton, Alberta, Canada
- Varsity teams: 8 (4 men's, 4 women's)
- Basketball arena: Christenson Family Centre
- Ice hockey arena: Downtown Community Arena
- Soccer stadium: Edmonton Scottish Dome
- Volleyball arena: Christenson Family Centre
- Nickname: Griffins
- Colors: Maroon and White
- Website: macewangriffins.ca
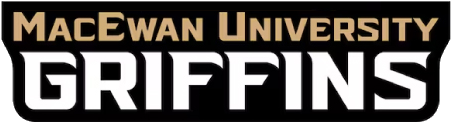

The MacEwan Griffins are the athletic teams that represent MacEwan University in Edmonton, Alberta, Canada. In Canadian intercollegiate competition, teams compete in U Sports. USPORTS associations oversee the Canada West Universities Athletic Association regional conferences for which the MacEwan Griffins are members.

== Teams ==
Across 4 varsity sports disciplines, MacEwan University fields eight teams overall.

Men's sports	Women's sports
Basketball	Basketball
Ice hockey	Ice hockey
Soccer	Soccer
Volleyball	Volleyball

== Facilities ==
Venue	Sport(s)	Ref.
Edmonton Scottish Dome Clarke Stadium	Soccer	
Christenson Family Centre for Sport	Basketball; Volleyball	
Downtown Community Arena	Ice hockey	
