= Edmonton Scottish =

Canadian soccer club

Edmonton Scottish SC
- Full name: Edmonton Scottish Soccer Club
- Nicknames: Ellerslie Boot Boys; Tartans
- Short name: SCO
- Founded: List: 11 April 1907; 119 years ago, as Edmonton Caledonians Athletic Club 23 May 1937; 89 years ago, as Edmonton Scottish Soccer Club
- Stadium: Hamish Black Field; Ellerslie, Edmonton, Alberta
- Capacity: 1,612
- Coordinates: 53°24′13″N 113°29′21″W
- Head Coach: Paul Hamilton (League1); John Pegg (AMSL)
- 2025: L1AB, 5th (men); L1AB, 8th (women)
- Website: https://www.scottishunited.com/
Home colours	Away colours	Third colours

The Edmonton Scottish Soccer Club, better known as Edmonton Scottish, is a Canadian semi-professional soccer club based in Edmonton, Alberta.

They competed in League1 Alberta from 2023 to 2025 using its youth affiliate's moniker Scottish United, the club has also competed continuously in the Alberta Major Soccer League (AMSL) since 1992 – simultaneously fielding reserve squads and adult teams across several leagues within the Edmonton and District Soccer Association (EDSA). The teams train at the Edmonton Soccer Dome and play home matches at Hamish Black Field, both of which are located at Grant MacEwan Park in the Ellerslie area of southeast Edmonton.

In 2016, Edmonton Scottish completed the amateur domestic treble, capping off an undefeated season by winning the Challenge Trophy to become Canada Soccer national champions for the first time — having previously finished as runners-up in 1992, 2012, and 2015. They are eight-time AMSL league winners and thirteen-time provincial champions, capturing the Bennett Shield in 1913 and the Alberta Soccer Challenge Cup a total of twelve times since 1972. The club was recognized by the Canada Soccer Hall of Fame in 2019 as an Organisation of Distinction, and in 2021 it was announced that they have formed a semi-professional team and would begin seeking entry to an interprovincial league – eventually joining the League1 Canada pyramid in 2023.

The club is affiliated with nine-time Jubilee Trophy champions, Edmonton Angels.

== History ==

The club was founded in 1909 by Scottish immigrants who settled in the Edmonton area. The senior men participate in the Alberta Major Soccer League (AMSL), where they have won multiple league titles.

In 1972, they participated in the Challenge Trophy, the Canadian national amateur championship, reaching the quarter-finals. In 1987, they won the bronze medal in the Challenge Trophy, followed by silver medal performances in 1992, 2012, and 2015. In 2016, following an undefeated outdoor season in the AMSL, they were able to capture their first title as Canadian amateur champions.

Edmonton Angels logo

The Angels Scottish women's team has won nine Jubilee Trophies as women's national amateur champions, including the inaugural title in 1982, which was the first of five consecutive national titles.

In 2021, the club announced their intention to launch semi-professional men's and women's teams with the goal of participated in a new interprovincial league in 2022. In 2023, they became part of the new League1 Alberta, competing under the name Edmonton Scottish United SC. They won the men's league title in 2024, earning qualification to the 2025 Canadian Championship. In March 2026, they announced that they would pause operation of the team and not participate in the 2026 season.

== Facilities ==
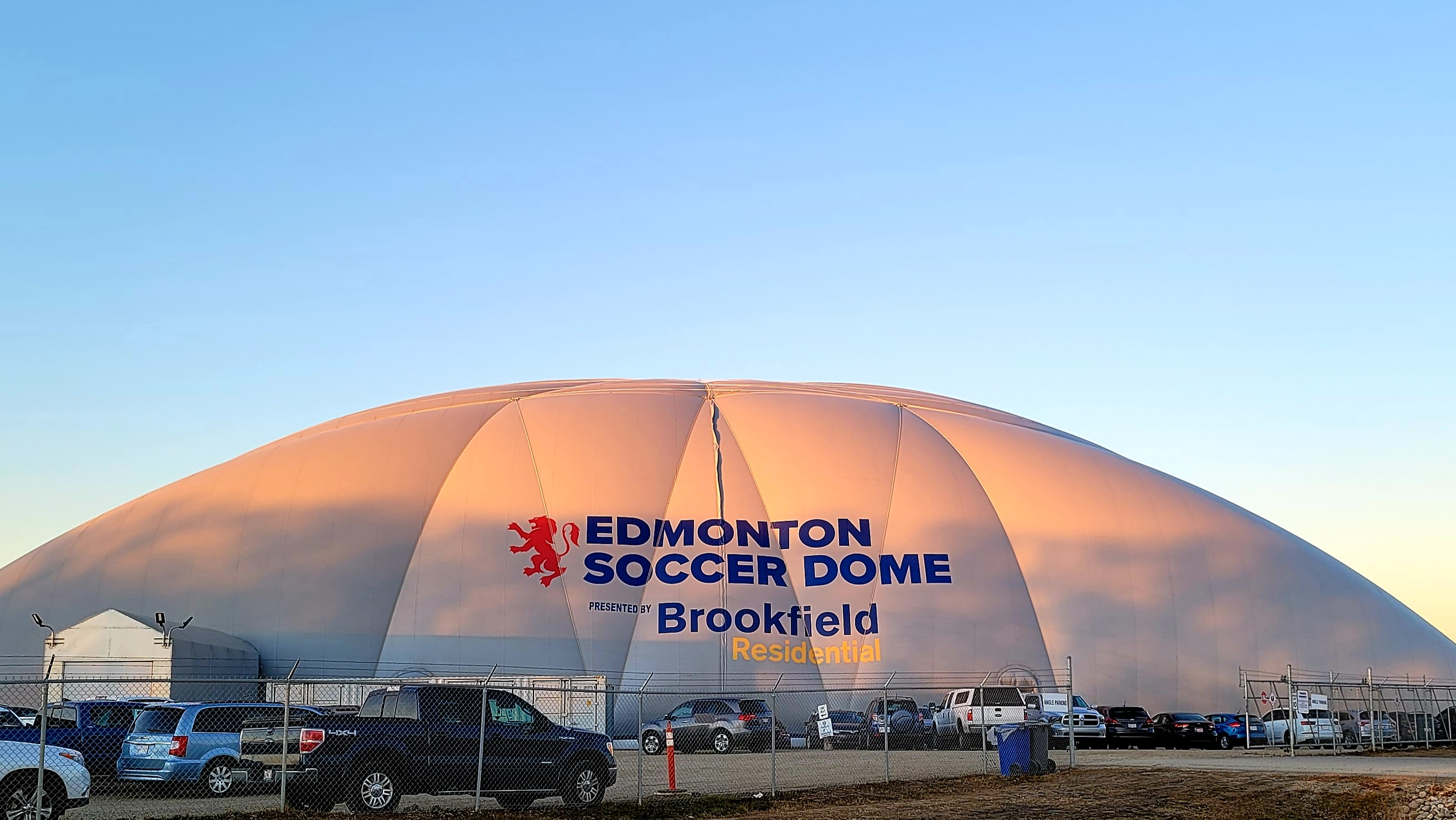
Edmonton Scottish are primary tenants of the Edmonton Soccer Dome, pictured here in November 2021.

=== Grant MacEwan Park ===
As part of a 1967 Centennial project, the Edmonton Scottish Society acquired a 20-acre parcel of ancestral land in the Ellerslie neighbourhood of Edmonton — an area that had been previously settled by Scots, dating back to as early as 1895. Constructing six soccer fields and a fully fixtured soccer pavilion for its senior teams on the land, the society would officially open the park in 1970 and name it after Lieutenant Governor Grant MacEwan.

In 2018, the grounds were named in the United 2026 FIFA World Cup bid as a potential team base camp. In 2019, plans to build a new, 2,200 m^{2} (24,000 sq ft) banquet hall and clubhouse (including twelve changing rooms, a bar, and a restaurant) were announced, with further plans to build a microstadium revealed in 2021.

==== Hamish Black Field ====
Located within Grant MacEwan Park, Hamish Black Field is a natural grass pitch that measures 105 metres (115 yd) long by 73 metres (80 yd) wide and serves as the home field for Edmonton Scottish teams. For ticketed matches such as the 2021 Summer Series, the club sets up beer gardens and brings in temporary seating, increasing the capacity to 1,612 spectators.

==== Edmonton Soccer Dome ====
In October 2018, construction was completed on the Edmonton Soccer Dome, a CA$7 million air-supported structure that features a FieldTurf CORE artificial turf playing surface. Located in Grant MacEwan Park, the dome is the club's primary training facility and is occasionally used for matches that may have otherwise been impacted by inclement weather.

== Club culture ==
=== Rivalries ===
Bertie Mee says to Bill Shankly
'Have you heard of Callies from Calgary?'
Shanks says 'no, I don't think so',
'but I've heard of the Ellerslie Boot Boys!'

Da da da dadadada da da da (x3),
We are the Ellerslie Boot Boys!

— Edmonton Scottish supporters' chant

Since 1907, the Callies, and later Edmonton Scottish, have maintained three distinct rivalries. Most prominently, the club has had a century-long rivalry with their Scottish Battle of Alberta counterparts, the Calgary Callies, and throughout the 1950s, developed a cross-city rivalry with 1st DFC Victoria following consecutive meetings in Dragoon Cup Finals. A third rivalry with Edmonton Ital-Canadians emerged in the 1970s, with the teams often competing for league titles in EDSA, and later the first iteration of AMSL.

=== Supporters ===
==== Tartan Army ====
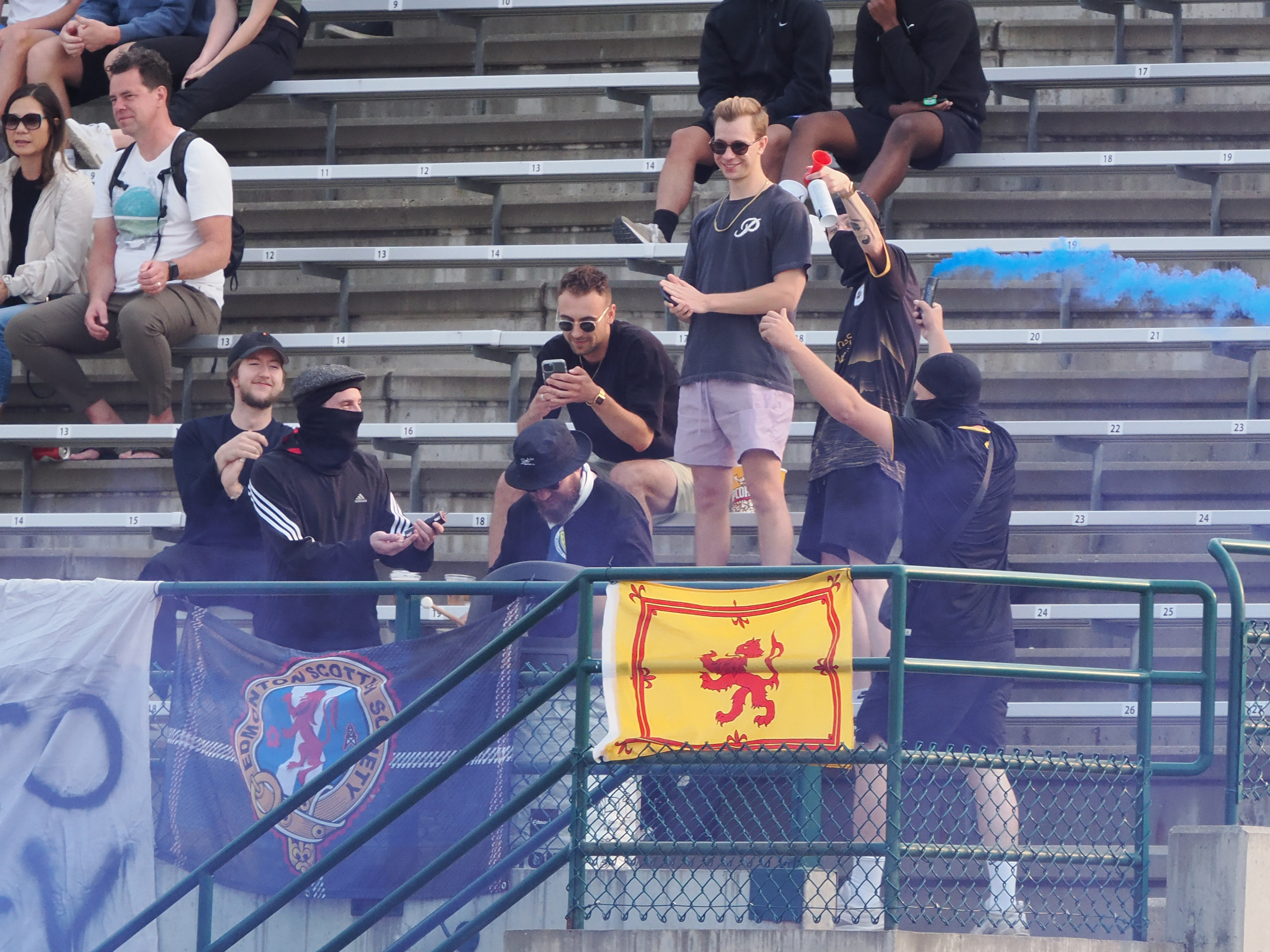
Members of the Highland Herd Crew pictured cheering on Edmonton Scottish during a League1 Alberta match.

Supporters of Edmonton Scottish are known collectively as the tartan army. For ticketed matches, they are joined by the Clan MacNaughton pipe band, who provide a guard of honour as teams walk onto the pitch.

==== Highland Herd Crew ====
In 2023, an independent group of ultras called the Highland Herd Crew was founded by Scottish supporters to cheer on its League1 Alberta and AMSL squads. Occupying the north stands of Hamish Black Field, they quickly became known for their drumming, use of smoke grenades, and tifo displays.

=== Team colours and crest ===
Edmonton Scottish SC's crest is inspired by the crest worn by Scotland's national soccer team. A roundel encloses a shield, with the words "Edmonton Scottish Soccer Club" written around the outside. In the shield's background lays a lion rampant surrounded by 11 thistle, representing the national flower of Scotland and the number of players on a soccer pitch. The club's official colours are Big Stone Blue and Polo Blue, which symbolize loyalty, strength, trust, and their connection to Scotland, as well as Maroon Flush, which pays homage to the autumn colours of the nearby Ewing Trail tree tunnel.

== Kits and sponsorship ==
Beginning in 2009, Edmonton Scottish have signed deals with specific kit manufacturers, with Macron currently supplying the club until at least 2024. The club wore Scotland replica kits throughout the '80s and '90s, but have since moved back to their traditional dark blue shirts with white shorts and white socks as its home kit — reversing the colours for its change strip.

Having previously partnered with local businesses, the club has gone without shirt or sleeve sponsors since moving to Macron in 2019.

The club has permanently retired number 20 in honour of midfielder Chris Kooy, who died from colon cancer in 2020.

Period	Kit manufacturer	Shirt sponsor (chest)	Shirt sponsor (sleeve)
2009–2011	Umbro	Aristocrat Liquor Mart	–
2012–2015	Umbro	Antrim Construction	Ashley Fine Floors
2016–2018	Umbro	Blackrock EMI	–
2019–	Macron	–	–

== Players and staff ==
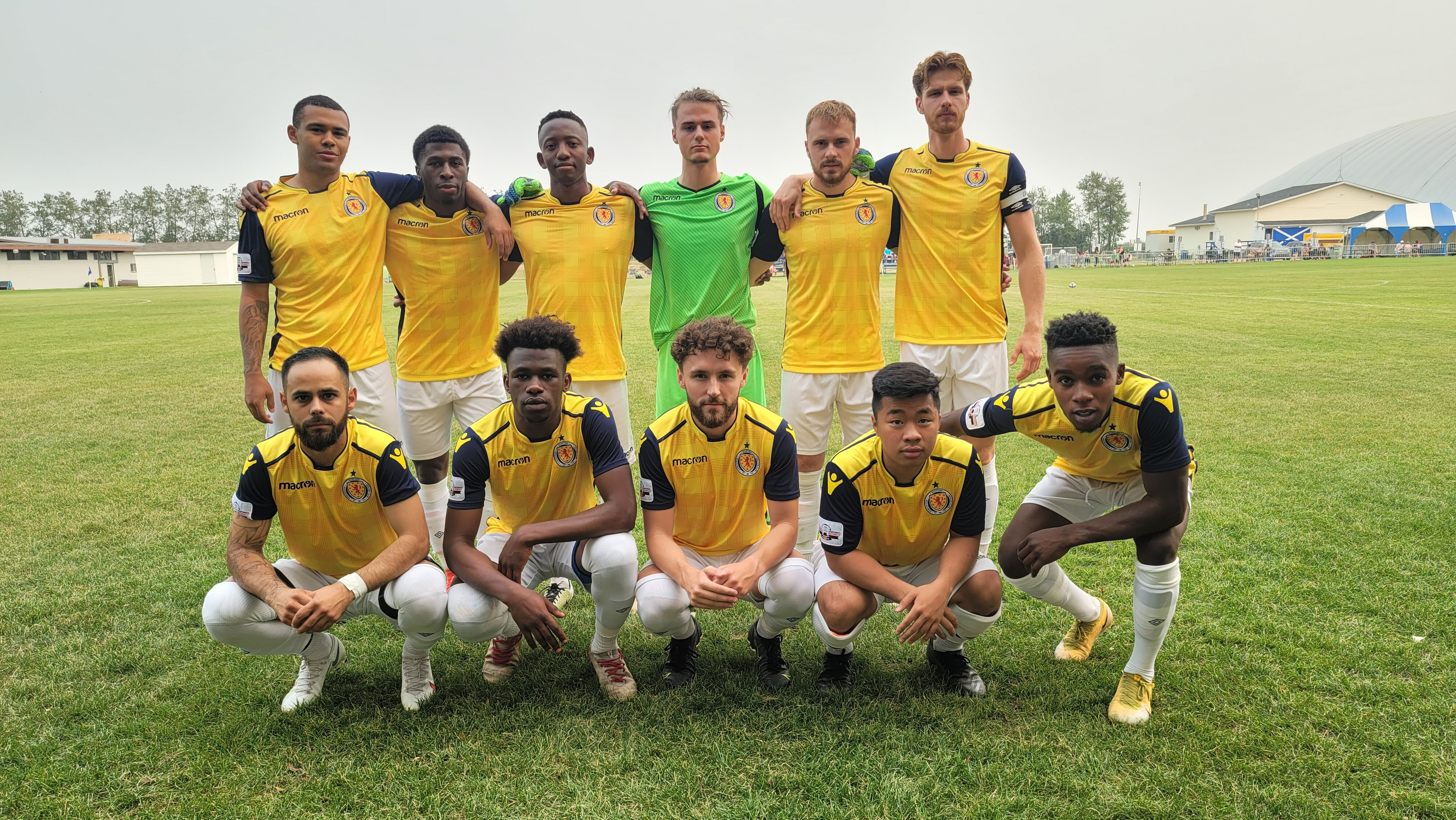
Edmonton Scottish's starting XI, pictured ahead of a 2021 Summer Series match vs. USL2's FC Manitoba

=== Roster ===
==== Current squad ====
As of July 31, 2023

Note: Flags indicate national team as defined under FIFA eligibility rules; some limited exceptions apply. Players may hold more than one non-FIFA nationality.

No.	Pos.	Nation	Player
1	GK	CAN	Connor James
2	DF	CAN	Bryce Prochnau
3	DF	SCO	Cameron Borrett
4	MF	CAN	Mike McCormick (vice-captain)
5	DF	SCO	Stewart Jamieson
6	DF	CAN	Josh Samuel
7	MF	HKG	Sam Lam
8	DF	CAN	Morgan Graham
9	FW	SOM	Izak Bahdon
10	MF	CAN	Sebastián Cabrera
11	FW	BIH	Almir Gazić
12	MF	CAN	Justin Demers
13	FW	SCO	Conor MacDonald

No.	Pos.	Nation	Player
14	FW	CAN	Dexter MacLachlan
15	FW	ENG	Tomi Ameobi
16	MF	BIH	Haris Kevac
17	MF	CAN	Stefan Gajić
18	DF	CAN	Paul Hamilton (captain)
19	MF	CAN	Francesco Guido
21	MF	HKG	Matt Lam
22	DF	ZIM	Zibusiso Moyo
23	MF	CAN	Nicholas Lechelt
24	DF	CAN	Noah Cunningham
25	GK	CAN	Jay Vetsch (vice-captain)
30	GK	UKR	Oleksandr Popravka

=== Current staff ===
- (Canada) Kevin Poissant – Head Coach
- (Canada) James Black – Assistant Coach

=== Notable players ===
This is a list of players who have played for a national team or have played professionally, either before or after joining Edmonton Scottish.

- (England) Tomi Ameobi
- (Canada) James Black
- (Canada) Chance Carter
- (Canada) Michael Cox
- (Canada) André Duberry
- (Poland) Waldemar Dutra
- (Bosnia and Herzegovina) Amer Halilić
- (Canada) Paul Hamilton
- (Canada) Harold Hansen
- (Canada) Connor James
- (Canada) Chris Kooy
- (Canada) Matt Lam
- (Canada) Sam Lam
- (Canada) Chris Lemire
- (England) Shaun Lowther
- (Democratic Republic of the Congo) Ousman Maheshe
- (Scotland) Gordon Menzies
- (Ghana) Edem Mortotsi
- (Canada) Dylon Powley
- (Canada) Niko Saler
- (Canada) Ajeej Sarkaria
- (Canada) Marcus Simmons
- (Ethiopia) (El Salvador) (Canada) Marcus Velado-Tsegaye
- (Canada) Kyle Yamada

== Player development ==
=== Scottish United ===
Founded in 2004, Scottish United serves as the youth extension of Edmonton Scottish. Among the inaugural recipients of the Canada Soccer National Youth Club Licence, its youth teams compete in the Alberta Youth Soccer League (AYSL) and within the Edmonton Minor Soccer Association (EMSA). As of 2022, its youth teams encompass over 1,300 players — with over 40% of the female teams in the Greater Edmonton Area playing for the club.

Players training in the youth stream receive MLS homegrown player benefits and are generally eligible to play for the first team or reserve squads as youth trialists by age 16. In recent years, Scottish United players have gone on trial with FC Edmonton, joined Whitecaps FC Academy, or have graduated from youth soccer to the senior club's AMSL or EDSA teams.

== Broadcasting ==
In order to provide programming to its members during the COVID-19 pandemic, Edmonton Scottish began its own free, in-house streaming service called Fitba.TV along with its youth affiliate, Scottish United in 2020. While the club has since began using its Fitba.TV service to broadcast its 2021 Summer Series home matches, its AMSL matches are live-streamed by CFN Media.

== Honours ==
=== National competitions ===
- Challenge Trophy

Winners (1): 2016
Runners-up (3): 1992, 2012, 2015

=== Provincial competitions ===
==== League titles ====
- Alberta Major Soccer League (present)

Winners (8): 1994, 2003, 2009, 2012, 2013, 2016, 2022, 2023
Runners-up (8): 1998, 2000, 2001, 2004, 2005, 2011, 2014, 2019

- Alberta Major Soccer League (1975–1980)

Winners (2): 1975, 1980

==== Cups ====
- Bennett Shield

Winners (1): 1913
Runners-up (4): 1908, 1909, 1912, 1926

- Campbell Cup

Runners-up (1): 1935

- Jack Bushnell League Cup

Runners-up (3): 2000, 2002, 2003

- John Dolan League Cup

Winners (2): 1976, 1978

- Mike Traficante Challenge Cup

Winners (12): 1972, 1979, 1987, 1992, 1996, 2012, 2013, 2015, 2016, 2018, 2019, 2023
Runners-up (5): 1993, 1994, 2001, 2010, 2022

==== Awards ====
- Alberta Soccer Golden Shoe

Winners (3): 1992, 2012, 2016

=== Local competitions ===
==== League titles ====
- Edmonton City Football League Series

Winners (6): 1908, 1909, 1910, 1912, 1913, 1914

- Edmonton Senior League Championship

Runners-up (3): 1922, 1926, 1927

==== Cups and tournaments ====
- Charity Shield

Winners (4): 1912, 1913, 1924, 1927
Runners-up (1): 1928

- Dragoon Cup

Winners (11): 1921, 1926, 1927, 1933, 1934, 1958, 1960, 1963, 1973, 1974, 1975
Runners-up (5): 1925, 1928, 1930, 1959, 1964

- Germania Cup

Winners (1): 1958

- Klondike Cup

Winners (1): 1972
Runners-up (1): 1974

- Vets-Martin Trophy

Winners (3): 1925, 1926, 1927
Runners-up (4): 1928, 1931, 1934, 1936

== Record ==
=== Year-by-year ===
Season	League									Other Competitions			Ref.
Season	League	Pld	W	D	L	GF	GA	Pts	Pos.	AMSL League Cup	Challenge Cup	Challenge Trophy	Ref.
1992 Outdoor	AMSL	17	7	6	4	34	18	20^{†}	4th	–	1st	2nd	
1993 Outdoor	AMSL	18	11	3	4	40	20	25^{†}	3rd	–	2nd	–	
1994 Outdoor	AMSL	18	14	0	4	56	24	28^{†}	1st	–	2nd	–	
1995 Outdoor	AMSL	[?]	[?]	[?]	[?]	[?]	[?]	[?]	[?]	–	6th	–	
1996 Outdoor	AMSL	[?]	[?]	[?]	[?]	[?]	[?]	[?]	[?]	–	1st	7th	
1997 Outdoor	AMSL	[?]	[?]	[?]	[?]	[?]	[?]	[?]	[?]	–	–	–	–
1998 Outdoor	AMSL	16	12	1	3	57	16	37	2nd	–	7th	–	
1999 Outdoor	AMSL	20	6	4	10	39	37	22	5th	–	5th	–	
2000 Outdoor	AMSL	14	8	3	3	26	15	27	2nd	2nd	4th	–	
2001 Outdoor	AMSL	14	8	5	1	27	11	29	2nd	5th	2nd	–	
2002 Outdoor	AMSL	14	8	0	6	26	25	24	3rd	2nd	4th	–	
2003 Outdoor	AMSL	14	11	1	2	34	15	34	1st	2nd	4th	–	
2004 Outdoor	AMSL	16	8	3	5	30	24	27	2nd	–	5th	–	
2005 Outdoor	AMSL	16	10	3	3	33	13	33	2nd	–	6th	–	
2006 Outdoor	AMSL	16	8	2	6	29	21	26	4th	–	3rd	–	
2007 Outdoor	AMSL	18	8	4	6	33	30	28	5th	–	3rd	–	
2008 Outdoor	AMSL	17	6	2	9	20	29	20	6th	–	4th	–	
2009 Outdoor	AMSL	18	12	2	4	46	20	38	1st	–	4th	–	
2010 Outdoor	AMSL	18	9	4	5	27	16	31	3rd	–	2nd	–	
2011 Outdoor	AMSL	14	9	4	1	22	9	31	2nd	–	3rd	–	
2012 Outdoor	AMSL	13	12	0	1	33	10	36	1st	–	1st	2nd	
2013 Outdoor	AMSL	14	9	4	1	36	15	31	1st	–	1st	7th	
2014 Outdoor	AMSL	14	8	4	2	28	11	28	2nd	–	4th	–	
2015 Outdoor	AMSL	14	7	3	4	29	16	24	3rd	–	1st	2nd	
2016 Outdoor	AMSL	14	11	3	0	48	15	36	1st	–	1st	1st	
2017 Outdoor	AMSL	14	8	3	3	26	14	27	3rd	–	3rd	–	
2018 Outdoor	AMSL	14	8	3	3	28	12	27	3rd	–	1st	5th	
2019 Outdoor	AMSL	17	9	5	3	47	18	32	2nd	–	1st	4th	
2020 Outdoor	AMSL	Competitions cancelled due to COVID-19 pandemic											
2021 Outdoor	AMSL	Competitions cancelled due to COVID-19 pandemic											
2022 Outdoor	AMSL	15	10	2	3	39	16	32	1st	–	2nd	–	
2023 Outdoor	AMSL	12	11	0	1	37	3	33	1st	–	1st	6th	
Totals	AMSL	419	248	74	97	930	473	–	–	–	–	–	–

^{†} Prior to 1995, two points were awarded for a win and one point was awarded for a draw

=== Challenge Trophy ===
Year	Pld	W	D	L	GF	GA	Result	Ref.
1972	1	0	0	1	0	1	Qualifiers	
1979	2	1	0	1	4	2	Qualifiers	
1987	3	2	1	0	5	3	3rd	
1992	3	2	0	1	2	1	2nd	
(Soccer New Brunswick) 1996	4	1	2	1	3	4	7th	
2012	5	3	2	0	7	4	2nd	
2013	5	2	0	3	5	9	7th	
2015	5	2	2	1	7	5	2nd	
2016	5	5	0	0	9	0	1st	
2018	5	2	1	2	8	6	5th	
2019	5	2	1	2	9	8	4th	
2023	5	2	1	2	7	6	6th	
Totals	48	24	10	14	66	49	–	–
