= Alberta Premier League =

Canadian soccer league founded in 2023

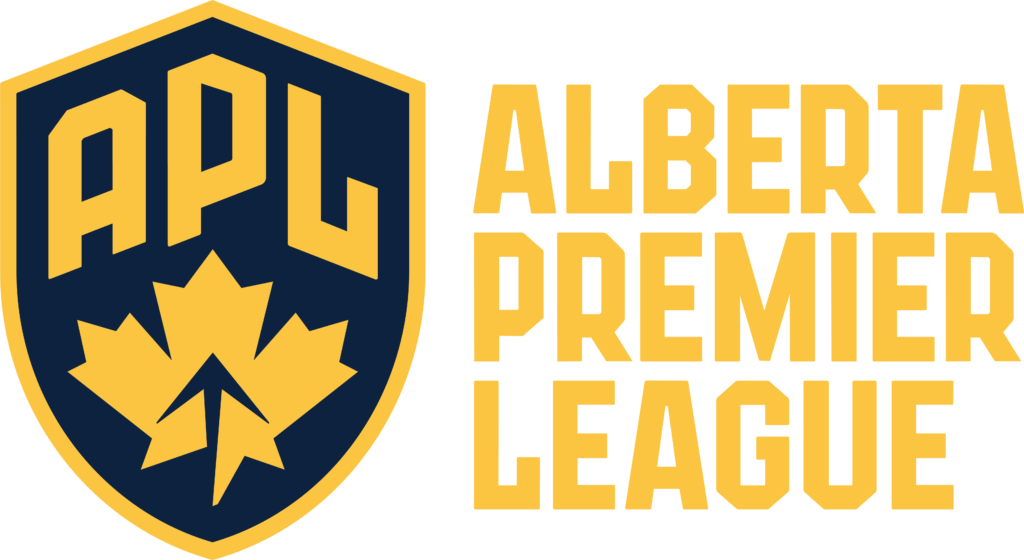
- Organising body: Canadian Soccer Association; Alberta Soccer Association
- Founded: 2023
- First season: 2024
- Country: Canada
- Confederation: CONCACAF
- Number of clubs: 8 (men's); 8 (women's)
- Level on pyramid: 3
- Domestic cups: Canadian Championship (men); Interprovincial Championship (women)
- Current champions: Edmonton BTB SC (men); Calgary Wild FC U23 (women); (2026)
- Most championships: Three teams (1 title, men); Calgary Blizzard SC (2 titles, women)
- Broadcaster(s): Alberta's Own
- Website: aplsoccer.ca
- Current: 2026 Alberta Premier League season

The Alberta Premier League (formerly League1 Alberta) is a semi-professional men's and women's soccer league in Alberta, Canada. The league is sanctioned by the Canadian Soccer Association and the Alberta Soccer Association as a third division pro–am league in the Canadian soccer league system.

In the Canadian soccer league system, the men's division is below the Canadian Premier League (CPL). It is part of Premier Soccer Leagues Canada, the national third tier with regional divisions, with Alberta Premier League equivalent to LS Pro (Quebec), Ontario Premier League, and British Columbia Premier League. The men's league champion qualifies for the Canadian Championship, the domestic cup championship, while the women's league champion qualifies for the Premier Soccer Leagues Canada Women's Inter-Provincial Championship.

== History ==
In 2021, a group of clubs from British Columbia, Alberta, and Manitoba organized the 2021 Summer Series, a series of friendly soccer matches played between Western Canadian soccer clubs to showcase a potential national second division. In 2022, another exhibition showcase was organized by four clubs – three from Alberta (Calgary Foothills FC, Edmonton Scottish, BTB Soccer Academy) and one from Manitoba (FC Manitoba) – as an entity known as Central League1.

In March 2023, League1 Alberta was announced with an exhibition series being organized, with six clubs participating (five in each gendered division) – the Calgary Foothills, Edmonton Scottish, St. Albert Impact, and BTB Soccer Academy fielded teams of both genders, while Cavalry FC fielded a team in the men's series and the Calgary Blizzard in the women's division. The first matches were played on May 12, 2023, with an official league season planned to be launch for the following season.

In December 2023, it was announced that the league would officially be sanctioned for official competition under the League1 Canada umbrella for the 2024 season, with seven clubs participating in each division.

In January 2026, the league re-branded as the Alberta Premier League, in line with a move across all the leagues in Canada.

== Clubs ==
Eight men's teams and eight women's teams are participating in the 2026 season, of which six are based in Greater Calgary and two are based in Greater Edmonton.

Calgary Alberta Premier League

Edmonton Alberta Premier League

=== Alberta Premier League ===
As of May 8, 2026

Current teams
Team	City	Stadium	Capacity	Founded	Debut	Male	Female
Callies United	Calgary	Shane Homes West Soccer Dome	300	2024	2024	Yes	Yes
Calgary Blizzard SC	Calgary	Broadview Park	1000	1967	2024	Yes	Yes
Calgary Foothills FC	Calgary	Macron Performance Centre	2000	1972	2023	Yes	Yes
Calgary Rangers SC	Springbank	Webber Athletic Park	320	2001	2025	Yes	Yes
Calgary Wild FC U23	Calgary	Macron Performance Centre	2000	2024	2024	No	Yes
Calgary Villains FC	Calgary	Villains Dome		1981	2025	Yes	Yes
Cavalry FC II	Calgary	Shouldice Athletic Park	2000	2023	2023	Yes	No
Edmonton BTB SC	Edmonton	Clarke Stadium	5130	2013	2023	Yes	Yes
St. Albert Impact	St. Albert	Riel Recreation Park		1999	2023	Yes	Yes

=== Former clubs ===
Former clubs
Team	City	Stadium	First season	Last season
Edmonton Scottish	Edmonton	Hamish Black Field	2023	2025

== Seasons ==
Champions
Season	Men's champion	Women's champion
2023 (Note: Exhibition series)	Calgary Foothills FC	Calgary Blizzard SC
2024	Edmonton Scottish (1)	Calgary Blizzard SC (1)
2025	Calgary Blizzard SC (1)	Calgary Blizzard SC (2)
2026	Edmonton BTB SC (1)	Calgary Wild FC U23 (1)

== See also ==
- 2021 Summer Series
- Canadian soccer league system
- Soccer in Canada
