= 2026 Cavalry FC season =

Cavalry FC
2026 season
- Owner: Spruce Meadows Sports & Entertainment
- President: Ian Allison
- Head coach: Tommy Wheeldon Jr.
- Stadium: ATCO Field
- Canadian Premier League: 1st
- CPL playoffs: Winners
- Canadian Championship: Quarter-finals
- Top goalscorer: League: Tobias Warschewski (11); All: Tobias Warschewski (15)
- Highest home attendance: 6,012 vs. Vancouver Whitecaps (July 13, CC)
- Lowest home attendance: 3,001 vs. Inter Toronto (April 25, CPL)
- Average home league attendance: 3,944
- Biggest win: 6–0 vs. FC Supra (Home, September 25, CPL)
- Biggest defeat: 1–4 vs. Vancouver Whitecaps (Away, July 8, CC)
Home colours	Away colours

The 2026 Cavalry FC season was the eighth season in the history of Cavalry FC. In addition to the Canadian Premier League, the club also competed in the Canadian Championship.

Cavalry FC won the both the CPL Shield and the Canadian Premier League title, becoming the first team in the league to complete a domestic double, and also qualified for the 2027 CONCACAF Champions Cup.

== Squad ==
As of September 22, 2026

No.	Player	Nationality	Position(s)	Date of birth (age)	Previous club	Notes
Goalkeepers
21	Joseph Holliday	(Canada)	GK	January 18, 2005 (age 21)	(Canada) Cavalry FC U21	U21
29	Nathan Ingham	(Canada)	GK	January 27, 1993 (age 33)	(Canada) Atlético Ottawa	
41	Cristiano de Sousa	(Canada)	GK	2009 or 2010 (age 16)	(Canada) Cavalry FC II	U21, DEV
Defenders
3	Curtis Ofori	(United States)	LB	November 20, 2005 (age 21)	(United States) New York Red Bulls	INT
4	Daan Klomp	(Netherlands)	CB	August 10, 1998 (age 28)	(Belgium) La Louvière	
5	Bradley Kamdem	(France)	LB	August 18, 1994 (age 32)	(Malta) Valletta	
15	Levi Laing	(England)	CB	April 12, 2003 (age 23)	(England) Aldershot Town	INT
16	Adam Pearlman	(Canada)	RB	April 5, 2005 (age 21)	(Canada) Toronto FC	U21, Loan
24	Eryk Kobza	(Canada)	CB / DM	November 23, 2001 (age 24)	(Canada) Calgary Dinos	
32	Kacper Plocinski	(Canada)	RB	July 1, 2010 (age 16)	(Canada) Cavalry FC II	U21, DEV
55	Amer Didic	(Canada)	CB	December 28, 1994 (age 31)	(Canada) Atlético Ottawa	
	Daniel Pribytov	(Canada)	CB	2009 (age 17)	(Canada) Cavalry FC II	U21, DEV
Midfielders
6	Michael Baldisimo	(Philippines)	DM	April 13, 2000 (age 26)	(United States) San Jose Earthquakes	
8	Harry Paton	(Canada)	CM	May 23, 1998 (age 28)	(Canada) Forge FC	
10	Sergio Camargo	(Canada)	AM	August 16, 1994 (age 32)	(Canada) Calgary Foothills	
17	Nathaniel Edwards	(Canada)	RW / LW	October 18, 2002 (age 24)	(Canada) Toronto FC	
18	Maël Henry	(Canada)	CM / RW	May 26, 2004 (age 22)	(Canada) Vancouver FC	
28	Niko Myroniuk	(Canada)	CM / LM	July 21, 2005 (age 21)	(Canada) Mount Royal Cougars	U21
30	James McGlinchey	(Canada)	CM	May 18, 2007 (age 19)	(Canada) Cavalry FC U21	U21, EYT
	Micah Hyatt	(Canada)	CM	2009 (age 17)	(Canada) Cavalry FC II	U21, DEV
Forwards
7	Ali Musse	(Somalia)	RW / ST / LW	January 1, 1996 (age 30)	(Germany) 1. FCA Darmstadt	
9	Tobias Warschewski	(Germany)	ST / AM	February 6, 1998 (age 28)	(Canada) FC Edmonton	
11	Hassan Ayari	(Tunisia)	AM / LW / RW	December 8, 2002 (age 23)	(Bulgaria) OFC Vihren	INT
14	Caniggia Elva	(Saint Lucia)	AM / ST / RW	July 14, 1996 (age 30)	(Germany) Rot-Weiß Erfurt	
19	Owen Antoniuk	(Canada)	ST / LW / RW	August 26, 2002 (age 24)	(Canada) Calgary Dinos	U-S
20	Goteh Ntignee	(Canada)	LW	May 10, 2002 (age 24)	(France) Annecy	
35	Owen Graham-Roache	(Canada)	ST	February 11, 2008 (age 18)	(Canada) CF Montréal	U21, Loan

=== Staff ===
As of May 8, 2026

Executive
Owner, chairman, and CEO	(Canada) Linda Southern-Heathcott
President and COO	(Canada) Ian Allison
General manager	(England) Tommy Wheeldon Jr.
Assistant general manager	(Canada) Tofa Fakunle
Coaching staff
Head coach	(England) Tommy Wheeldon Jr.
Technical director and assistant coach	(England) Jay Wheeldon
Assistant coach	(Canada) Nik Ledgerwood
Goalkeeper coach	(England) Jack Hadley

== Transfers ==
=== In ===
No.	Pos.	Player	From club	Fee/notes	Date	Source
29	GK	(Canada) Nathan Ingham	(Canada) Atlético Ottawa	Free	January 1, 2026	
55	DF	(Canada) Amer Didić	(Canada) Atlético Ottawa	Free	January 15, 2026	
8	MF	(Canada) Harry Paton	(Canada) Forge FC	Free	February 5, 2026	
17	MF	(Canada) Nathaniel Edwards	(Canada) Toronto FC	Free	February 9, 2026	
3	DF	(United States) Curtis Ofori	(United States) New York Red Bulls	Free	February 11, 2026	
22	MF	(Canada) Max Piepgrass	(Canada) CBU Capers	Signed to a U-Sports contract	April 2, 2026	
19	FW	(Canada) Owen Antoniuk	(Canada) Calgary Dinos	Signed to a U-Sports contract	April 2, 2026	
27	DF	(Canada) Luc Ihama	(Canada) TMU Bold	Signed to a U-Sports contract	May 22, 2026	
41	GK	(Canada) Cristiano de Sousa	(Canada) Cavalry FC II	Signed to a Development Contract	July 28, 2026	
32	DF	(Canada) Kacper Plocinski	(Canada) Cavalry FC II	Signed to a Development Contract	August 20, 2026	
	DF	(Canada) Daniel Pribytov	(Canada) Cavalry FC II	Signed to a Development Contract	August 20, 2026	
11	FW	(Tunisia) Hassan Ayari	(Bulgaria) OFC Vihren	Free	September 10, 2026	
	MF	(Canada) Micah Hyatt	(Canada) Cavalry FC II	Signed to a Development Contract	September 22, 2026	

==== Loans in ====
No.	Pos.	Player	From club	Fee/notes	Date	Source
16	DF	(Canada) Adam Pearlman	(Canada) Toronto FC	Season-long loan	March 23, 2026	
35	FW	(Canada) Owen Graham-Roache	(Canada) CF Montréal	Until end of 2026	September 17, 2026	

==== Draft picks ====
Cavalry FC selected the following players in the 2026 CPL–U Sports Draft. Draft picks are not automatically signed to the team roster. Only those who are signed to a contract will be listed as transfers in.

Round	Selection	Pos.	Player	Nationality	University
1	7	FW	Emmanuel Dan-Adokiene	Canada	Trinity Western
2	14	DF	Luc Ihama	Canada	TMU

=== Out ===
==== Transferred out ====
No.	Pos.	Player	To club	Fee/notes	Date	Source
19	DF	(Moldova) Mihail Gherasimencov	(Canada) Whitecaps FC 2	Loan ended	November 9, 2025	
1	GK	(Canada) Marco Carducci	(Canada) Halifax Wanderers	Contract expired	December 31, 2025	
33	DF	(Canada) Fraser Aird	(Canada) Calgary Foothills	Contract expired	December 31, 2025	
26	MF	(Bangladesh) Shamit Shome	(United States) New York Cosmos	Contract expired	December 31, 2025	
17	FW	(Germany) Nicolas Wähling	(Germany) FC Carl Zeiss Jena	Contract expired	December 31, 2025	
12	DF	(Republic of Ireland) Tom Field	(Canada) Vancouver FC	Option declined	December 31, 2025	
27	MF	(Canada) Diego Gutiérrez	(Cambodia) Phnom Penh Crown	Option declined	December 31, 2025	
25	FW	(Netherlands) Ayman Sellouf	(Netherlands) Vitesse	Option declined	December 31, 2025	
3	DF	(Canada) Callum Montgomery	(United States) Detroit City FC	Undisclosed fee	February 3, 2026	
2	DF	(Canada) Michael Harms	(Canada) St. Francis Xavier X-Men	Contract terminated by mutual consent	July 2, 2026	
22	MF	(Canada) Max Piepgrass	(Canada) Pacific FC	Undisclosed fee & sell-on clause	July 30, 2026	
11	FW	(New Zealand) Jay Herdman	(Indonesia) Bali United FC	Undisclosed fee	August 17, 2026	
27	DF	(Canada) Luc Ihama	(Canada) TMU Bold	U-Sports contract expired, rights retained for 2027 season	August 19, 2026	

== Competitions ==
=== Overview ===
Competition	First match	Last match	Starting round	Final position	Record							
Competition	First match	Last match	Starting round	Final position	Pld	W	D	L	GF	GA	GD	Win %
Canadian Premier League	April 5	October 25	Matchday 1	Winners	28	18	6	4	58	23	+35	64.29
Canadian Premier League playoffs	November 1	November 21	Semi-finals	Winners	3	2	0	1	6	4	+2	66.67
Canadian Championship	May 9	July 13	Preliminary round	Quarter-finals	3	1	1	1	5	6	−1	33.33
Total					34	21	7	6	69	33	+36	61.76

Source: Competitions

=== Canadian Premier League ===
==== Table ====
Pos	Team	Pld	W	D	L	GF	GA	GD	Pts	Qualification
1	Cavalry FC (S, C)	28	18	6	4	58	23	+35	60	2027 CONCACAF Champions Cup and Playoffs (Note: As CPL Shield winner)
2	Forge FC (V)	28	17	7	4	49	22	+27	58	2027 CONCACAF Champions Cup and Playoffs (Note: As winners of Canadian Championship)
3	Atlético Ottawa	28	13	4	11	42	45	−3	43	2027 CONCACAF Champions Cup and Playoffs (Note: As the highest-ranked team not already qualified)
4	Supra du Québec	28	11	5	12	47	50	−3	38	Playoffs
5	Vancouver FC	28	10	7	11	39	37	+2	37	
6	Inter Toronto	28	7	9	12	42	65	−23	30	
7	HFX Wanderers	28	7	7	14	44	50	−6	28	
8	Pacific FC	28	2	9	17	33	62	−29	15	

Source: CPL
Rules for classification: 1) Points; 2) Total wins; 3) Head-to-head; 4) Goal differential; 5) Goals for; 6) Away goal differential; 7) Away goals for; 8) Home goal differential; 9) Home goals for; 10) Fewest disciplinary points; 11) Most under-21 domestic player minutes; 12) Drawing of lots.
(C) Champion; (S) CPL Shield winner; (V) Canadian Championship winners

==== Matches ====
The Canadian Premier League season began on April 4, 2026.

April 5 1	Pacific FC	1–2	Cavalry FC	Langford, British Columbia
15:00 (UTC-07:00)	Konincks 73'; Baldisimo (yellow card) 19'; Greco-Taylor (yellow card) 90+7'	Report	Warschewski 31' (pen.); Paton 48'; Pearlman (yellow card) 43'; Camargo (yellow card) 45+5'; Ntignee (yellow card) 65'	Stadium: Starlight Stadium; Attendance: 3,362; Referee: Sebastian Noshinravani; Assistant referees: Marko Kalic, Michael Hood; Fourth official: Mario Alayass; Man of the Match: Harry Paton

April 12 2	Cavalry FC	3–1	Atlético Ottawa	Foothills County, Alberta
14:00 (UTC-06:00)	Klomp 17'; Paton 22', (yellow card) 24'; Ntignee 67'; Pearlman (yellow card) 45+3'; Camargo (yellow card) 77'	Report	Habibullah 88'; Mejia (coach) (yellow card) 87'	Stadium: ATCO Field; Attendance: 3,567; Referee: Michael Venne; Assistant referees: Marko Kalic, Sean Hornsby; Fourth official: Mathieu Souaré; Man of the Match: Harry Paton

April 18 3	Forge FC	0–0	Cavalry FC	Hamilton, Ontario
16:00 (UTC-04:00)	Nimick (yellow card) 9'; Rama (yellow card) 34' (yellow-red card) 56'; Smyrniotis (coach) (yellow card) 61'	Report	Didić (yellow card) 15'; Kobza (yellow card) 90+3'	Stadium: Hamilton Stadium; Attendance: 4,178; Referee: Scott Bowman; Assistant referees: Graham Forsyth, Vasyl Dzikh; Fourth official: Sebastian Noshinravani; Man of the Match: Nathan Ingham

April 25 4	Cavalry FC	1–1	Inter Toronto FC	Foothills County, Alberta
15:00 (UTC-06:00)	Klomp 36'; Paton (yellow card) 17'; Laing (yellow card) 74'	Report	Skublak 41'; Singh (yellow card) 19'; Jimoh (yellow card) 35'; Sturing (yellow card) 42'; Córdova (yellow card) 73'	Stadium: ATCO Field; Attendance: 3,001; Referee: Yusri Rudolf; Assistant referees: Sangmuk Choi, Aubrey Kotelko; Fourth official: Iwan-Nikita Jecanski; Man of the Match: Tomasz Skublak

May 3 5	FC Supra du Québec	0–1	Cavalry FC	Laval, Quebec
15:00 (UTC-04:00)	Ferdinand (yellow card) 12'; Chrétien (yellow card) 45'; Mlah (yellow card) 50'; Abzi (yellow card) 66'; Rea (yellow card) 82'; El Kalkouli (yellow card) 90+5'; Biello (red card) 90+13'	Report	Ntignee (yellow card) 84'; Warschewski 88' (pen.)	Stadium: Stade Boréale; Attendance: 4,008; Referee: Fabrizio Stasolla; Assistant referees: Paulin-Junior Vanié, Igho Hope; Fourth official: Mario Alayass; Man of the Match: Diyaeddine Abzi

May 17 6	Vancouver FC	0–2	Cavalry FC	Langley, British Columbia
18:00 (UTC-07:00)	Amissi (yellow card) 11'; Traoré (yellow card) 23'; Campbell (yellow card) 54'; Mousset (yellow card) 88'	Report	Ingham (yellow card) 66'; Warschewski (yellow card) 66', (goal) 70'; Laing 90+7'	Stadium: Willoughby Community Park; Attendance: 2,298; Referee: Mario Alayass; Assistant referees: Michael Hood, Prem Gundarah; Fourth official: Mario Alayass; Man of the Match: Goteh Ntignee

May 24 7	Cavalry FC	3–0	Pacific FC	Foothills County, Alberta
15:00 (UTC-06:00)	Pearlman (yellow card) 50'; Camargo 59'; Didić 69'; Kobza (yellow card) 85'; Warschewski 90+4'	Report		Stadium: ATCO Field; Attendance: 4,044; Referee: Scott Bowman; Assistant referees: Sangmuk Choi, Prem Gundarah; Fourth official: Thomas Noel; Man of the Match: Tobias Warschewski

May 31 8	Forge FC	1–0	Cavalry FC	Hamilton, Ontario
16:00 (UTC-04:00)	Aromatario (yellow card) 5'; Batisse 70'	Report	Kobza (yellow card) 29'; Ingham (yellow card) 78'; Ntignee (yellow card) 86'	Stadium: Hamilton Stadium; Attendance: 6,101; Referee: Renzo Villanueva; Assistant referees: Brad Doubrough, Vasyl Dzikh; Fourth official: Mathieu Souaré; Man of the Match: Antoine Batisse

June 6 9	Cavalry FC	2–0	HFX Wanderers FC	Foothills County, Alberta
17:00 (UTC-06:00)	Kobza (yellow card) 30'; Pearlman (yellow card) 38'; Paton (yellow card) 55'; Ntignee 68'; Klomp 79'	Report	Callegari (yellow card) 76'; Godinho (yellow card) 84'	Stadium: ATCO Field; Attendance: 4,106; Referee: Sebastian Noshinravani; Assistant referees: Daniel Boudreau, Eray Demirtas; Fourth official: Mazzen Black; Man of the Match: Daan Klomp

June 10 10	Inter Toronto FC	1–5	Cavalry FC	Toronto, Ontario
19:30 (UTC-04:00)	Singh (yellow card) 60'; Laing 68' (o.g.); Ferrari (yellow card) 90+1'	Report	Warschewski 10'; Camargo 44'; Edwards 52'; Klomp (yellow card) 73'; Elva 87'; Myroniuk 90+3'	Stadium: York Lions Stadium; Attendance: 2,200; Referee: Yusri Rudolf; Assistant referees: Vasyl Dzikh, Prem Gundarah; Fourth official: Melvin Christopher; Man of the Match: Tobias Warschewski

July 4 12	Atlético Ottawa	0–3	Cavalry FC	Ottawa, Ontario
15:00 (UTC-04:00)	Khoury (yellow card) 80'; Castro (yellow card) 86'	Report	Ntignee (yellow card) 4', (goal) 17'; Camargo 9'; Elva 39'; Kamdem (yellow card) 45+4'; Paton (yellow card) 53'; Ingham (yellow card) 84'	Stadium: TD Place Stadium; Attendance: 4,007; Referee: Carly Shaw-MacLaren; Assistant referees: Gerard-Kader Lebuis, Twayne Anderson; Fourth official: Michael Venne; Man of the Match: Caniggia Elva

July 18 13	Cavalry FC	1–1	HFX Wanderers FC	Foothills County, Alberta
13:00 (UTC-06:00)	Ntignee (yellow card) 39'; Warschewski 52' (pen.); Klomp (yellow card) 90+6'	Report	Johnston 77'	Stadium: ATCO Field; Attendance: 4,050; Referee: Renzo Villanueva; Assistant referees: Sangmuk Choi, Vasyl Dzikh; Fourth official: Carly Shaw-MacLaren; Man of the Match: Isaiah Johnston

July 24 14	Vancouver FC	1–0	Cavalry FC	Langley, British Columbia
19:00 (UTC-07:00)	Polisi (yellow card) 25'; Traore (yellow card) 37'; Nash (coach) (yellow card) 39'; Mousset 59'; Bah (yellow card) 70'	Report	Kobza (yellow card) 23' (yellow-red card) 42'; Paton (yellow card) 90+5'	Stadium: Willoughby Community Park; Attendance: 2,018; Referee: Mathieu Souaré; Assistant referees: Eray Demirtas, Theo Diederichsen; Fourth official: Amer Ramic; Man of the Match: Kian Proctor

July 28 11	Cavalry FC	2–1	FC Supra du Québec	Foothills County, Alberta
19:00 (UTC-06:00)	Edwards 3'; Laing (yellow card) 43'; Camargo (yellow card) 53'; Didić 90+3', (yellow card) 90+4'; Antoniuk (yellow card) 90+8'	Report	Abzi (yellow card) 38'; Ferdinand 55', (yellow card) 90+8'	Stadium: ATCO Field; Attendance: 3,710; Referee: Ben Hoskins; Assistant referees: Michael Hood, Sangmuk Choi; Fourth official: Mazzen Black; Man of the Match: Amer Didić
Note: Match rescheduled from June 28 due to inclement weather in the Calgary area.

August 1 15	Cavalry FC	5–0	Inter Toronto FC	Foothills County, Alberta
19:00 (UTC-06:00)	Pearlman 17'; Antoniuk 51'; Musse 61'; Edwards 68'; Elva 86'	Report	Guzmán (yellow card) 65'; Skublak (yellow card) 74'	Stadium: ATCO Field; Attendance: 3,806; Referee: Carly Shaw-MacLaren; Assistant referees: Daniel Boudreau, Paulin-Junior Vanié; Fourth official: Amer Ramic; Man of the Match: Tobias Warschewski
Note: Match rescheduled from July 31 to accommodate the rescheduled week 11 match.

August 8 16	FC Supra du Québec	1–1	Cavalry FC	Laval, Quebec
20:00 (UTC-06:00)	El Kalkouli (yellow card) 40'; Lebeuf (yellow card) 67'; Sissoko 80'	Report	Kobza (yellow card) 31'; Paton (yellow card) 59'; Pearlman (yellow card) 68'; Elva 88'	Stadium: Stade Boréale; Attendance: 2,152; Referee: Sebastian Noshinravani; Assistant referees: Travis Lefebvre, Reda Fazazi; Fourth official: Thomas Noel; Man of the Match: Aboubacar Sissoko

August 15 17	Cavalry FC	2–1	Forge FC	Foothills County, Alberta
15:00 (UTC-06:00)	Edwards (yellow card) 38'; Klomp 62'; Antoniuk 83'	Report	Oketokoun 20'; Rama (red card) 38'; Nimick (yellow card) 41'; Sadek (yellow card) 41'; Aromatario (yellow card) 66'; Bourgeois (yellow card) 79'; Jevremović (red card) 90'	Stadium: ATCO Field; Attendance: 4,721; Referee: Roberto D'Alesio; Assistant referees: Graham Forsyth, Sangmuk Choi; Fourth official: Renzo Villanueva; Man of the Match: Tobias Warschewski

August 22 18	Cavalry FC	3–1	Atlético Ottawa	Foothills County, Alberta
14:30 (UTC-06:00)	Edwards 13'; Warschewski 18', 53'; Paton (yellow card) 45+4'; Didić (yellow card) 61'	Report	Fleuriau Chateau 22'; Assi (yellow card) 22'; Mbomio (yellow card) 59'; Khoury (yellow card) 85'	Stadium: ATCO Field; Attendance: 4,429; Referee: Yusri Rudolf; Assistant referees: Marko Kalic, Camille Raymond; Fourth official: Mazzen Black; Man of the Match: Tobias Warschewski

August 29 19	Cavalry FC	1–0	Vancouver FC	Foothills County, Alberta
15:00 (UTC-06:00)	Kamdem (yellow card) 31', (goal) 58'	Report	Campagna (yellow card) 42'; Proctor (yellow card) 57'	Stadium: ATCO Field; Attendance: 4,510; Referee: Michael Venne; Assistant referees: Daniel Boudreau, Sangmuk Choi; Fourth official: Amer Ramic; Man of the Match: Bradley Kamdem

September 7 20	HFX Wanderers FC	1–3	Cavalry FC	Halifax, Nova Scotia
16:00 (UTC-03:00)	Johnston 87' (pen.), (yellow card) 90+5'	Report	Myroniuk (yellow card) 26'; Edwards 48', (yellow card) 59'; Warschewski 64'; Camargo 75'; Ofori (yellow card) 90+5'	Stadium: Wanderers Grounds; Referee: Scott Bowman; Assistant referees: André Pickler, Onder Yilmaz; Fourth official: Scott Decker; Man of the Match: Sergio Camargo

September 13 21	Pacific FC	0–1	Cavalry FC	Langford, British Columbia
15:00 (UTC-07:00)	Kratt (yellow card) 28'	Report	Kobza (yellow card) 15'; Klomp 81'	Stadium: Starlight Stadium; Attendance: 2,067; Referee: Alain Ruch; Assistant referees: Eray Demirtas, Michael Hood; Fourth official: David Schmidt-Schweda; Man of the Match: Daan Klomp

September 19 22	Cavalry FC	1–1	Forge FC	Foothills County, Alberta
15:00 (UTC-06:00)	Paton (yellow card) 30'; Camargo (yellow card) 57'; Warschewski (yellow card) 68' (yellow-red card) 90+2'; Antoniuk 90'	Report	Massunda (yellow card) 36'; James (yellow card) 62'; Jensen 80'; Cavallini (yellow card) 90+5'	Stadium: ATCO Field; Attendance: 5,009; Referee: Michael Venne; Assistant referees: Jasmain Parr, Graham Forsyth; Fourth official: Iwan-Nikita Jecanski; Man of the Match: Tobias Warschewski

September 25 23	Cavalry FC	6–0	FC Supra du Québec	Foothills County, Alberta
19:00 (UTC-06:00)	Musse 7' (pen.), 68', 90+2'; Edwards 16'; Pearlman (yellow card) 29'; Didić 62'; Henry 84'	Report	Kwemi (yellow card) 66'; dos Santos (yellow card) 70'; Condé (yellow card) 73'; Lebeuf (yellow card) 77'; Chrétien (yellow card) 90'	Stadium: ATCO Field; Attendance: 3,261; Referee: Sebastian Noshinravani; Assistant referees: Sangmuk Choi, Onder Yilmaz; Fourth official: Yusri Rudolf; Man of the Match: Ali Musse

September 30 24	Atlético Ottawa	3–2	Cavalry FC	Ottawa, Ontario
19:00 (UTC-06:00)	Gutiérrez (yellow card) 43'; Habibullah 59', 73'; Antinoro 90+10'	Report	Eryk Kobza 9'; Paton (yellow card) 51'; Pearlman (yellow card) 57'; Ntignee (yellow card) 80' (yellow-red card) 81'; Warschewski 90+4'; Baldisimo (yellow card) 90+8'	Stadium: TD Place Stadium; Attendance: 3,181; Referee: Carly Shaw-MacLaren; Assistant referees: Sean Hornsby, Paulin-Junior Vanié; Fourth official: Sebastian Noshinravani; Man of the Match: Kamron Habibullah

October 3 25	Inter Toronto FC	3–1	Cavalry FC	Toronto, Ontario
13:00 (UTC-04:00)	Gonzales 6'; Yeates 12', 69', (yellow card) 50'; López (yellow card) 33'; Singh (yellow card) 73'; Almagro (yellow card) 77'	Report	Paton (yellow card) 71'; Kobza (yellow card) 78'; Didić 83'; Musse (yellow card) 90+2'	Stadium: York Lions Stadium; Attendance: 1,025; Referee: Roberto D'Alesio; Assistant referees: Graham Forsyth, Vasyl Dzikh; Fourth official: Mario Alayass; Man of the Match: Ariel Almagro

October 12 26	HFX Wanderers FC	2–2	Cavalry FC	Halifax, Nova Scotia
17:00 (UTC-03:00)	Bahamboula 6'; Zitman (yellow card) 71'; Meilleur-Giguère 90+2'; Callegari (yellow card) 90+7'	Report	Klomp (yellow card) 32'; Kobza (yellow card) 34'; Elva 40'; Musse 55'; Kamdem (yellow card) 72'; Paton (red card) 77'	Stadium: Wanderers Grounds; Attendance: 5,214; Referee: Scott Bowman; Assistant referees: Travis Lefebvre, Vasyl Dzikh; Fourth official: Ben Hoskins; Man of the Match: Ryan Telfer

October 17 27	Cavalry FC	4–2	Pacific FC	Foothills County, Alberta
14:00 (UTC-06:00)	Klomp 12'; Warschewski 17' (pen.); Pearlman (yellow card) 42'; Kamdem 45+1'; Musse 51' (pen.); Henry (yellow card) 82'	Report	Vales 9'; Chung (yellow card) 25'; Bustos 44' (pen.); Quintana (yellow card) 50'; Juhmi (yellow card) 53'	Stadium: ATCO Field; Attendance: 3,476; Referee: Renzo Villanueva; Assistant referees: Sangmuk Choi, Marko Kalic; Fourth official: Iwan-Nikita Jecanski; Man of the Match: Bradley Kamdem

October 25 28	Cavalry FC	1–0	Vancouver FC	Foothills County, Alberta
14:00 (UTC-06:00)	Musse 29'	Report	Polisi (red card) 90+8'	Stadium: ATCO Field; Attendance: 3,527; Referee: Mario Alayass; Assistant referees: Twayne Anderson, Graham Forsyth; Fourth official: Scott Bowman; Man of the Match: Ali Musse

==== Playoff matches ====
===== Semi-finals =====
November 1 First leg	FC Supra du Quebec	2–1	Cavalry FC	Laval, Quebec
16:00 (UTC-05:00)	Brault-Guillard 4'; Kobza 9' (own); Biello (yellow card) 40'	Report	Baldisimo (yellow card) 14'; Warschewski 45+1'; Paton (yellow card) 77'	Stadium: Stade Boréale; Attendance: 4,432; Referee: Yusri Rudolf; Assistant referees: Travis Lefebvre, Aubrey Kotelko; Fourth official: Ben Hoskins; Man of the Match: Loïc Kwemi

November 7 Second leg	Cavalry FC	2–0 (3–2 agg.)	FC Supra du Quebec	Foothills County, Alberta
15:00 (UTC-06:00)	Elva 25'; Kamdem (yellow card) 38'; Musse 60'; Baldisimo (yellow card) 74'	Report	Biello (yellow card) 65' (red card) 90+9'; Kwemi (yellow card) 70'	Stadium: ATCO Field; Attendance: 5,199; Referee: Michael Venne; Assistant referees: Graham Forsyth, Prem Gundarah; Fourth official: Roberto D'Alesio; Man of the Match: Ali Musse

===== Final =====
November 21 Single leg	Cavalry FC	v	Atlético Ottawa	Foothills County, Alberta
14:00 (UTC-06:00)		Report		Stadium: ATCO Field

=== Canadian Championship ===
The draw for the preliminary round and quarter-finals was held on January 17, 2026.

==== Preliminary round ====
May 9 Single leg	Pacific FC	1–3	Cavalry FC	Langford, British Columbia
16:00 (UTC-07:00)	Marshall (yellow card) 18'; Chung (yellow card) 50'; Belluz 78'; Bustos (yellow card) 85'	Report	Klomp 24'; Musse (yellow card) 84'; Warschewski 88' (pen.); Baldisimo 90+4'	Stadium: Starlight Stadium; Attendance: 2,043; Referee: Alain Ruch; Assistant referees: Prem Gundarah, Jasmain Parr; Fourth official: Roberto D'Alesio; Man of the Match: Daan Klomp

==== Quarter-finals ====
July 8 First leg	Vancouver Whitecaps FC	4–1	Cavalry FC	Burnaby, British Columbia
19:30 (UTC-07:00)	Pearlman 2' (o.g.); Blackmon (yellow card) 45+2'; Müller 61'; White 64'; Elloumi 75'; Ngando (yellow card) 77'	Report	Klomp 45'; Kobza (yellow card) 53'; Ntignee (yellow card) 90+3'	Stadium: Swangard Stadium; Attendance: 5,086; Referee: Yusri Rudolf; Assistant referees: Jasmain Parr, Prem Gundarah; Fourth official: Fabrizio Stasolla; Man of the Match: Brian White

July 13 Second leg	Cavalry FC	1–1 (2–5 agg.)	Vancouver Whitecaps FC	Foothills County, Alberta
19:30 (UTC-06:00)	Didić (yellow card) 38'; Kobza (yellow card) 52'; Musse 75'	Report	Laborda (yellow card) 1'; Gherasimencov 86'	Stadium: ATCO Field; Attendance: 6,012; Referee: Michael Venne; Assistant referees: Graham Forsyth, Michael Hood; Fourth official: Alain Ruch; Man of the Match: Ali Musse

== Statistics ==
As of November 7, 2026

=== Squad and statistics ===
No.	Pos	Nat	Player	Total		CPL		CPL playoffs		Canadian Championship	
No.	Pos	Nat	Player	Apps	Goals	Apps	Goals	Apps	Goals	Apps	Goals
29	GK	(Canada) CAN	Nathan Ingham	32	0	27	0	2	0	3	0
21	GK	(Canada) CAN	Joseph Holliday	1	0	1	0	0	0	0	0
41	GK	(Canada) CAN	Cristiano de Sousa	0	0	0	0	0	0	0	0
3	DF	(United States) USA	Curtis Ofori	15	0	13	0	0	0	2	0
4	DF	(Netherlands) NED	Daan Klomp	32	8	27	6	2	0	3	2
5	DF	(France) FRA	Bradley Kamdem	29	2	24	2	2	0	3	0
15	DF	(England) ENG	Levi Laing	20	1	15	1	2	0	3	0
16	DF	(Canada) CAN	Adam Pearlman	30	1	27	1	0	0	3	0
24	DF	(Canada) CAN	Eryk Kobza	29	1	25	1	1	0	3	0
32	DF	(Canada) CAN	Kacper Plocinski	1	0	1	0	0	0	0	0
55	DF	(Canada) CAN	Amer Didić	31	4	26	4	2	0	3	0
	DF	(Canada) CAN	Daniel Pribytov	0	0	0	0	0	0	0	0
6	MF	(Philippines) PHI	Michael Baldisimo	21	1	16	0	2	0	3	1
8	MF	(Canada) CAN	Harry Paton	27	2	23	2	2	0	2	0
10	MF	(Canada) CAN	Sergio Camargo	26	4	22	4	1	0	3	0
17	MF	(Canada) CAN	Nathaniel Edwards	28	6	25	6	2	0	1	0
18	MF	(Canada) CAN	Maël Henry	13	1	11	1	2	0	0	0
28	MF	(Canada) CAN	Niko Myroniuk	24	1	21	1	1	0	2	0
30	MF	(Canada) CAN	James McGlinchey	7	0	7	0	0	0	0	0
	MF	(Canada) CAN	Micah Hyatt	0	0	0	0	0	0	0	0
7	FW	(Somalia) SOM	Ali Musse	29	9	24	7	2	1	3	1
9	FW	(Germany) GER	Tobias Warschewski	30	13	26	11	2	1	2	1
11	FW	(Tunisia) TUN	Hassan Ayari	3	0	3	0	0	0	0	0
14	FW	(Saint Lucia) LCA	Caniggia Elva	30	6	25	5	2	1	3	0
19	FW	(Canada) CAN	Owen Antoniuk	16	3	15	3	1	0	0	0
20	FW	(Canada) CAN	Goteh Ntignee	22	3	19	3	0	0	3	0
35	FW	(Canada) CAN	Owen Graham-Roache	6	0	4	0	2	0	0	0
Player(s) transferred out during this season
2	DF	(Canada) CAN	Michael Harms	0	0	0	0	0	0	0	0
27	DF	(Canada) CAN	Luc Ihama	0	0	0	0	0	0	0	0
22	MF	(Canada) CAN	Max Piepgrass	1	0	1	0	0	0	0	0
11	FW	(New Zealand) NZL	Jay Herdman	11	0	9	0	0	0	2	0

=== Goal scorers ===
Rank	Nat.	Player	Pos.	CPL	CPL Playoffs	Canadian Championship	TOTAL
1	(Germany)	Tobias Warschewski	FW	11	1	1	13
2	(Somalia)	Ali Musse	FW	7	1	1	9
3	(Netherlands)	Daan Klomp	DF	6	0	2	8
4	(Canada)	Nathaniel Edwards	MF	6	0	0	6
4	(Saint Lucia)	Caniggia Elva	FW	5	1	0	6
6	(Canada)	Sergio Camargo	MF	4	0	0	4
6	(Canada)	Amer Didić	DF	4	0	0	4
8	(Canada)	Goteh Ntignee	FW	3	0	0	3
8	(Canada)	Owen Antoniuk	FW	3	0	0	3
10	(Canada)	Harry Paton	MF	2	0	0	2
10	(France)	Bradley Kamdem	DF	2	0	0	2
12	(Philippines)	Michael Baldisimo	MF	0	0	1	1
12	(Canada)	Niko Myroniuk	MF	1	0	0	1
12	(England)	Levi Laing	DF	1	0	0	1
12	(Canada)	Adam Pearlman	DF	1	0	0	1
12	(Canada)	Eryk Kobza	MF	1	0	0	1
12	(Canada)	Maël Henry	MF	1	0	0	1
Own goals				0	0	0	0
Totals				58	0	5	63

=== Clean sheets ===
Rank	Nat.	Player	CPL	CPL Playoffs	Canadian Championship	TOTAL
1	(Canada)	Nathan Ingham	11	1	0	12
2	(Canada)	Joseph Holliday	0	0	0	0
2	(Canada)	Cristiano de Sousa	0	0	0	0
Totals			11	1	0	12

=== Disciplinary record ===
No.	Pos.	Nat.	Player	CPL		CPL Playoffs		Canadian Championship		TOTAL	
No.	Pos.	Nat.	Player	Yellow card	Red card	Yellow card	Red card	Yellow card	Red card	Yellow card	Red card
21	GK	(Canada)	Joseph Holliday	0	0	0	0	0	0	0	0
29	GK	(Canada)	Nathan Ingham	3	0	0	0	0	0	3	0
41	GK	(Canada)	Cristiano de Sousa	0	0	0	0	0	0	0	0
3	DF	(United States)	Curtis Ofori	1	0	0	0	0	0	1	0
4	DF	(Netherlands)	Daan Klomp	3	0	0	0	0	0	3	0
5	DF	(France)	Bradley Kamdem	3	0	1	0	0	0	4	0
15	DF	(England)	Levi Laing	2	0	0	0	0	0	2	0
16	DF	(Canada)	Adam Pearlman	8	0	0	0	0	0	8	0
24	DF/MF	(Canada)	Eryk Kobza	8	1	0	0	2	0	10	1
32	DF	(Canada)	Kacper Plocinski	0	0	0	0	0	0	0	0
55	DF	(Canada)	Amer Didić	3	0	0	0	1	0	4	0
	DF	(Canada)	Daniel Pribytov	0	0	0	0	0	0	0	0
6	MF	(Philippines)	Michael Baldisimo	1	0	2	0	0	0	3	0
8	MF	(Canada)	Harry Paton	10	1	1	0	0	0	11	1
10	MF	(Canada)	Sergio Camargo	4	0	0	0	0	0	4	0
11	MF	(Tunisia)	Hassan Ayari	0	0	0	0	0	0	0	0
17	MF	(Canada)	Nathaniel Edwards	2	0	0	0	0	0	2	0
18	MF	(Canada)	Maël Henry	2	0	0	0	0	0	2	0
22	MF	(Canada)	Max Piepgrass	0	0	0	0	0	0	0	0
28	MF	(Canada)	Niko Myroniuk	1	0	0	0	0	0	1	0
30	MF	(Canada)	James McGlinchey	0	0	0	0	0	0	0	0
	MF	(Canada)	Micah Hyatt	0	0	0	0	0	0	0	0
7	FW	(Somalia)	Ali Musse	2	0	0	0	1	0	3	0
9	FW	(Germany)	Tobias Warschewski	1	1	0	0	0	0	1	1
11	FW	(New Zealand)	Jay Herdman	0	0	0	0	0	0	0	0
14	FW	(Saint Lucia)	Caniggia Elva	0	0	0	0	0	0	0	0
19	FW	(Canada)	Owen Antoniuk	1	0	0	0	0	0	1	0
20	FW	(Canada)	Goteh Ntignee	5	1	0	0	1	0	6	1
35	FW	(Canada)	Owen Graham-Roache	0	0	0	0	0	0	0	0
Totals				60	4	4	0	5	0	69	4

== Honours ==
=== Canadian Premier League Awards ===
Nat.	Name	Award	Status	Source
(Canada)	Nathan Ingham	Golden Glove	Nominated	
(Canada)	Adam Pearlman	U-21 Player of the Year	Nominated	
(Netherlands)	Daan Klomp	Defender of the Year	Nominated	
(Netherlands)	Daan Klomp	Players' Player of the Year	Nominated	
(Somalia)	Ali Musse	Players' Player of the Year	Nominated	
(Germany)	Tobias Warschewski	Players' Player of the Year	Nominated	
(Germany)	Tobias Warschewski	Player of the Year	Nominated	

==== Monthly awards ====
Month	Nat.	Winner	Award	Source
May	(Germany)	Tobias Warschewski	Player of the Month	
May	(England)	Tommy Wheeldon Jr.	Manager of the Month	
May	(Canada)	Adam Pearlman	U-21 Player of the Month	
June	(Canada)	Goteh Ntignee	Player of the Month	
September	(England)	Tommy Wheeldon Jr. (2)	Manager of the Month	
September	(Canada)	Nathan Ingham	Goalkeeper of the Month	
September	(Canada)	Adam Pearlman (2)	U-21 Player of the Month	

==== Player of the week ====
Week	Nat.	Player	Source
2	(Canada)	Harry Paton	
7	(Germany)	Tobias Warschewski	
10	(Canada)	Goteh Ntignee	
15	(Germany)	Tobias Warschewski (2)	
18	(Germany)	Tobias Warschewski (3)	
20	(Canada)	Sergio Camargo	
23	(Somalia)	Ali Musse	

==== Team of the week ====
The Team of the Week is usually selected by the CPL's Kristian Jack and OneSoccer's Oliver Platt.

Week	Nat.	Player	Source
1	(Canada)	Harry Paton	
1	(Germany)	Tobias Warschewski	
1	(New Zealand)	Jay Herdman	
2	(Canada)	Harry Paton (2)	
2	(Netherlands)	Daan Klomp	
2	(Canada)	Sergio Camargo	
3	(Canada)	Adam Pearlman	
4	(Netherlands)	Daan Klomp (2)	
4	(Somalia)	Ali Musse	
5	(Netherlands)	Daan Klomp (3)	
5	(Canada)	Eryk Kobza	
6	(Canada)	Eryk Kobza (2)	
6	(Canada)	Goteh Ntignee	
6	(Germany)	Tobias Warschewski (2)	
7	(Canada)	Adam Pearlman (2)	
7	(Canada)	Amer Didić	
7	(Canada)	Sergio Camargo (2)	
7	(Germany)	Tobias Warschewski (3)	
8	(England)	Levi Laing	
9	(Canada)	Nathan Ingham	
9	(Canada)	Adam Pearlman (3)	
9	(Netherlands)	Daan Klomp (4)	
9	(Canada)	Goteh Ntignee (2)	
10	(Canada)	Sergio Camargo (3)	
10	(Canada)	Goteh Ntignee (3)	
10	(Germany)	Tobias Warschewski (4)	
12	(Canada)	Adam Pearlman (4)	
12	(Canada)	Goteh Ntignee (4)	
12	(Saint Lucia)	Caniggia Elva	
13	(Germany)	Tobias Warschewski (5)	
15	(Canada)	Joseph Holliday	
15	(Canada)	Adam Pearlman (5)	
15	(Canada)	Amer Didić (2)	
15	(Canada)	Eryk Kobza (3)	
15	(Canada)	Nathaniel Edwards	
15	(Germany)	Tobias Warschewski (6)	
17	(Canada)	Amer Didić (3)	
17	(Netherlands)	Daan Klomp (5)	
17	(Canada)	Harry Paton (3)	
18	(Canada)	Adam Pearlman (6)	
18	(Germany)	Tobias Warschewski (7)	
19	(Canada)	Nathan Ingham (2)	
19	(France)	Bradley Kamdem	
20	(Canada)	Adam Pearlman (7)	
20	(Canada)	Sergio Camargo (4)	
20	(Canada)	Nathaniel Edwards (2)	
20	(Germany)	Tobias Warschewski (8)	
21	(Canada)	Nathan Ingham (3)	
21	(Netherlands)	Daan Klomp (6)	
22	(Canada)	Amer Didić (4)	
23	(Canada)	Amer Didić (5)	
23	(Canada)	Eryk Kobza (4)	
23	(Canada)	Nathaniel Edwards (3)	
23	(Somalia)	Ali Musse (2)	
26	(Netherlands)	Daan Klomp (7)	
26	(France)	Bradley Kamdem (2)	
26	(Germany)	Tobias Warschewski (9)	
27	(Canada)	Amer Didić (6)	
27	(Somalia)	Ali Musse (3)	
