= Joseph Holliday (soccer) =

Canadian soccer player (born 2005)

Personal information
- Date of birth: January 18, 2005 (age 21)
- Place of birth: Edmonton, Alberta, Canada
- Position: Goalkeeper

Team information
- Current team: Cavalry FC
- Number: 21

Youth career
- SouthWest Sting SC
- 2017–2019: FC Edmonton
- 2019: Edmonton Internazionale SC

Senior career*
Years	Team	Apps	(Gls)
2021–2022	FC Edmonton	1	(0)
2023–	Cavalry FC	1	(0)
2024–	Cavalry FC II	13	(0)
- * Club domestic league appearances and goals as of July 28, 2026

Joseph Holliday (born January 18, 2005) is a Canadian professional soccer player who plays for Cavalry FC in the Canadian Premier League

== Early life ==
He began playing soccer at age ten with the Southwest Sting SC. In 2017, he joined the FC Edmonton Academy, at the age of twelve. He later represented Alberta at the U14 level at a combine against the Vancouver Whitecaps Academy, while he was a member of Edmonton Internazional SC. In 2019, he represented Alberta at the 2019 Western Canada Summer Games.

== Club career ==
=== FC Edmonton ===
In June 2021, he signed a developmental contract with FC Edmonton in the Canadian Premier League, at the age of sixteen. In May 2022, he signed another developmental contract with Edmonton. On October 8, 2022, he made his professional debut, coming on as a substitute in stoppage time in the season finale against Valour FC.

=== Cavalry FC ===
In March 2023, he signed a developmental contract with Cavalry FC. During 2023, he spent time with Cavalry's U21 side in the exhibition series of League1 Alberta. He began the 2024 season with Cavalry FC U21 in League1 Alberta before signing a fully professional contract with the first team for the remainder of the 2024 season, with an option for 2025 in late June. Holliday would get his first start for the club in the 2025 Canadian Championship against League1 Alberta side Edmonton Scottish, picking up a clean sheet in a 6-0 win. In January 2026, he signed a one-year extension with options for 2027 and 2028.

== Personal life ==
In 2025, Holliday started a charity foundation named Holliday Play.

== Career statistics ==
As of July 28, 2026

Club	Season	League			Playoffs		Domestic Cup		Continental		Total	
Club	Season	Division	Apps	Goals	Apps	Goals	Apps	Goals	Apps	Goals	Apps	Goals
FC Edmonton	2021	Canadian Premier League	0	0	–		0	0	–		0	0
FC Edmonton	2022	Canadian Premier League	1	0	–		0	0	–		1	0
FC Edmonton	Total		1	0	0	0	0	0	0	0	1	0
Cavalry FC	2023	Canadian Premier League	0	0	0	0	0	0	–		0	0
Cavalry FC	2024	Canadian Premier League	0	0	0	0	0	0	0	0	0	0
Cavalry FC	2025	Canadian Premier League	0	0	0	0	1	0	0	0	1	0
Cavalry FC	2026	Canadian Premier League	1	0	0	0	0	0	0	0	1	0
Cavalry FC	Total		1	0	0	0	1	0	0	0	2	0
Cavalry FC II	2024	Alberta Premier League	8	0	—		—		—		8	0
Cavalry FC II	2025	Alberta Premier League	3	0	—		—		—		3	0
Cavalry FC II	2026	Alberta Premier League	2	0	—		—		—		2	0
Cavalry FC II	Total		13	0	0	0	0	0	0	0	13	0
Career total			15	0	0	0	1	0	0	0	16	0
