= Adam Pearlman =

Adam Pearlman may refer to:

- Adam Pearlman (soccer) (born 2005), South African-Canadian soccer player
- Adam Yahiye Gadahn (1978–2015), born Adam Pearlman, American-born al-Qaeda operative
