= Curtis Ofori =

American soccer player (born 2005)

Personal information
- Date of birth: November 20, 2005 (age 20)
- Place of birth: Hopewell Junction, New York, United States
- Height: 5 ft 10 in (1.78 m)
- Position: Left-back

Team information
- Current team: Cavalry FC

Youth career
- Wappingers Lightning
- 2017–2022: New York Red Bulls

Senior career*
Years	Team	Apps	(Gls)
2021–2022	New York Red Bulls II	47	(0)
2023–2025	New York Red Bulls	0	(0)
2023–2025	→ New York Red Bulls II	37	(2)
2026–	Cavalry FC II	2	(0)
2026–	Cavalry FC	13	(0)
- * Club domestic league appearances and goals as of October 12, 2026

Curtis Ofori (born November 20, 2005) is an American professional soccer player who plays as a left-back for Canadian Premier League club Cavalry FC.

== Early life ==
Born in Hopewell Junction, New York, Ofori first began playing soccer at the age of three in nearby Wappingers Falls. He later joined the Wappingers Lightning, a club team coached by his father. In 2017, Ofori was recruited into the youth setup of the New York Red Bulls, joining the club's under-13 side. He progressed through the ranks of the academy and began playing for the under-19's in 2020, scoring his first goal for the side against Cedar Stars Monmouth. With the Red Bulls academy, Ofori scored a total of 5 goals in 67 matches.

== Club career ==
=== New York Red Bulls II ===
On March 22, 2021, Ofori signed a professional contract with New York Red Bulls II, the reserve affiliate of the New York Red Bulls in the USL Championship. He was the youngest professional signing in Red Bulls II history, joining the club at the age of 15 years and 122 days old. Prior to signing, Red Bulls II head coach John Wolyniec stated that Ofori had trained with Red Bulls II the previous season.

Ofori made his senior debut for New York Red Bulls II on May 7, 2021, against the Charleston Battery, coming on as a late-substitute in the 1–1 draw. On June 1, 2024, Ofori scored his first goal as a professional in a 3–2 loss to local rival New York City FC II. On September 1, 2024, he scored his second of the season in a 4–2 loss to Carolina Core FC. On November 8, 2025, Ofori appeared as a starter for New York Red Bulls II in a 3–3 tie in regulation against Colorado Rapids 2, a match New York won 4–3, in a penalty shootout at Sports Illustrated Stadium to claim the club's first MLS NEXT Pro Cup title.

=== New York Red Bulls ===
On December 1, 2022, it was announced that Ofori had signed a homegrown contract with the New York Red Bulls, starting from the 2023 season. On November 26, 2025, the team announced that they had declined his contract option.

=== Cavalry FC ===
In February 2026, Ofori signed a two-year contract with Canadian Premier League club Cavalry FC, with a club option for 2028.

== International career ==
Born in the United States, Ofori is of Ghanaian descent. While with the Red Bulls youth academy, Ofori was selected to be part of the roster for the United States under-14 boys national talent identification east team in April 2019.

== Career statistics ==
As of match played October 12, 2026

Appearances and goals by club, season and competition
Club	Season	League			Playoffs		National cup		Other		Total	
Club	Season	Division	Apps	Goals	Apps	Goals	Apps	Goals	Apps	Goals	Apps	Goals
New York Red Bulls II	2021	USL Championship	14	0	—		—		—		14	0
New York Red Bulls II	2022	USL Championship	27	0	—		—		—		27	0
New York Red Bulls II	Total		41	0	0	0	0	0	0	0	41	0
New York Red Bulls	2023	Major League Soccer	0	0	0	0	0	0	0	0	0	0
New York Red Bulls II (loan)	2023	MLS Next Pro	6	0	0	0	—		—		6	0
New York Red Bulls II (loan)	2024	MLS Next Pro	18	2	—		0	0	—		18	2
New York Red Bulls II (loan)	2025	MLS Next Pro	13	0	4	0	—		—		17	0
New York Red Bulls II (loan)	Total		37	2	4	0	0	0	0	0	41	2
Cavalry FC II	2026	Alberta Premier League	2	0	0	0	0	0	0	0	2	0
Cavalry FC	2026	CPL	13	0	0	0	2	0	0	0	15	0
Career total			93	2	4	0	2	0	0	0	99	2
