= Maël Henry =

Canadian soccer player (born 2004)

Personal information
- Date of birth: May 26, 2004 (age 22)
- Place of birth: Montreal, Quebec, Canada
- Height: 5 ft 10 in (1.78 m)
- Position: Midfielder

Team information
- Current team: Cavalry FC
- Number: 18

Youth career
- 2009–2015: CS Boucaniers
- 2016–2017: FS Salaberry
- 2017–2022: CF Montréal

Senior career*
| Years | Team | Apps | (Gls) |
| 2022 | CF Montréal U23 | 13 | (5) |
| 2023 | Vancouver FC | 3 | (0) |
| 2023– | Cavalry FC | 44 | (5) |
| 2026– | Cavalry FC II | 5 | (0) |

International career^{‡}
| 2019 | Canada U15 | 5 | (1) |
| 2022 | Canada U20 | 3 | (1) |
- * Club domestic league appearances and goals as of October 25, 2026 ‡ National team caps and goals as of June 22, 2022

Maël Henry (born May 26, 2004) is a Canadian soccer player who plays for Cavalry FC in the Canadian Premier League.

== Early life ==
Henry began playing youth soccer at age five with CS Boucaniers. He later played with FS Salaberry before joining the CF Montréal Academy in 2017. In November 2018, he was named the Academy's Player of the Month.

Henry also trialed with French clubs FC Lorient, AJ Auxerre and Stade Malherbe Caen.

== Club career ==
In 2022, he played with CF Montréal U23 in the Première ligue de soccer du Québec. After the season he had a two-week trial with French club FC Lorient, followed by a trial with the FC Nantes reserves, who offered him a pro trainee contract, but he was unable to sign due to some administrative issues.

In February 2023, he signed with Vancouver FC in the Canadian Premier League.

On June 29, 2023, he joined Cavalry FC in an intra-league swap for Mikaël Cantave. He made his debut for Cavalry on July 15 against the HFX Wanderers. He scored his first CPL goal on September 12, 2023 against the HFX Wanderers. He missed the first months of the 2024 season due to injury, returning in July, before suffering a season ending injury on August 24. In January 2025, Henry would sign a 2 year contract extension with Cavalry, keeping him at the club through the 2026 season, with a club option for 2027.

== International career ==
Henry was born in Canada to a French father and Canadian mother. In July 2019, he made his debut in the Canadian youth program in 2019 at a Canada U15 camp and was subsequently named to the roster for the 2019 CONCACAF Boys' Under-15 Championship. He was then named to the Canada U20 team for the 2022 CONCACAF U-20 Championship. On June 22, 2022, he scored against Saint Kitts and Nevis U20.

== Career statistics ==
As of November 21, 2026

| Club | Season | League | | | Playoffs | | Domestic Cup | | Continental | | Total | |
| Club | Season | Division | Apps | Goals | Apps | Goals | Apps | Goals | Apps | Goals | Apps | Goals |
|---|---|---|---|---|---|---|---|---|---|---|---|---|
| CF Montréal U23 | 2022 | Première ligue de soccer du Québec | 13 | 5 | – | | – | | – | | 13 | 5 |
| Vancouver FC | 2023 | Canadian Premier League | 3 | 0 | – | | 0 | 0 | – | | 3 | 0 |
| Cavalry FC | 2023 | Canadian Premier League | 12 | 2 | 3 | 0 | 0 | 0 | – | | 15 | 2 |
| Cavalry FC | 2024 | Canadian Premier League | 9 | 2 | 0 | 0 | 0 | 0 | 1 | 0 | 10 | 2 |
| Cavalry FC | 2025 | Canadian Premier League | 12 | 0 | 0 | 0 | 2 | 0 | 1 | 0 | 15 | 0 |
| Cavalry FC | 2026 | Canadian Premier League | 11 | 1 | 3 | 0 | 0 | 0 | 0 | 0 | 14 | 1 |
| Cavalry FC | Total | | 44 | 5 | 6 | 0 | 2 | 0 | 2 | 0 | 54 | 5 |
| Cavalry FC II | 2026 | Alberta Premier League | 5 | 0 | 0 | 0 | 0 | 0 | 0 | 0 | 5 | 0 |
| Career total | | | 65 | 10 | 6 | 0 | 2 | 0 | 2 | 0 | 75 | 10 |
