= Michael Harms =

Canadian soccer player (born 2005)

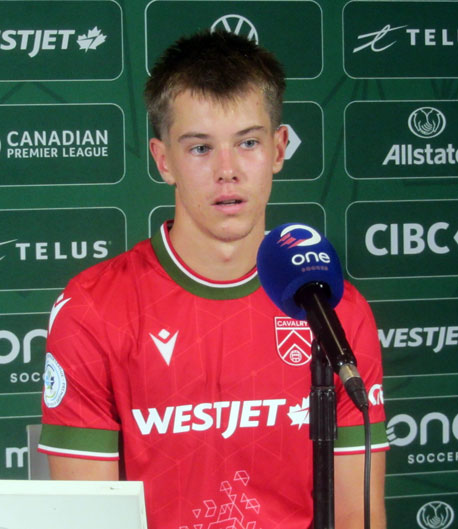
- Harms in 2024

Personal information
- Date of birth: October 8, 2005 (age 21)
- Place of birth: Calgary, Alberta, Canada
- Height: 5 ft 9 in (1.75 m)
- Position: Defender

Youth career
- Calgary Foothills FC
- 2022–2023: Cavalry FC

College career
Years	Team	Apps	(Gls)
2026-	St. Francis Xavier X-Men		

Senior career*
Years	Team	Apps	(Gls)
2022–2026	Cavalry FC	10	(0)
2024–2026	Cavalry FC II	22	(1)
- * Club domestic league appearances and goals as of May 19, 2026

Michael Harms (born October 8, 2005) is a Canadian soccer player who most recently played for Cavalry FC in the Canadian Premier League.

== Early life ==
Harms was born and raised in Calgary, Alberta. He played youth soccer with Calgary Foothills FC and later played with the Cavalry FC U20 in 2022. He played with Alberta at the 2022 Canada Summer Games.

== Club career ==
In July 2022, he signed a developmental contract with Cavalry FC of the Canadian Premier League, as a sixteen year old. In April 2023, he signed a second developmental contract with the club. During 2023, he spent time with the Cavalry U21 team in the League1 Alberta Exhibition Series. He made his professional debut for the first team on July 12, 2023, starting the match against Atlético Ottawa. In September 2023, he signed a full professional contract with the club through the 2024 season, with an additional two-year option. In January 2026, he signed a one-year extension with options for 2027 and 2028. In July 2026, it was announced that Harms' contract was terminated by mutual consent.

== Career statistics ==
As of match played May 19, 2026

Club	Season	League			Playoffs		Domestic Cup		Continental		Total	
Club	Season	Division	Apps	Goals	Apps	Goals	Apps	Goals	Apps	Goals	Apps	Goals
Cavalry FC	2023	Canadian Premier League	3	0	0	0	0	0	—		3	0
Cavalry FC	2024	Canadian Premier League	5	0	0	0	0	0	0	0	5	0
Cavalry FC	2025	Canadian Premier League	2	0	0	0	1	0	0	0	3	0
Cavalry FC	Total		10	0	0	0	1	0	0	0	11	0
Cavalry FC II	2024	Alberta Premier League	9	0	—		—		—		9	0
Cavalry FC II	2025	Alberta Premier League	10	1	—		—		—		10	1
Cavalry FC II	2026	Alberta Premier League	3	0	—		—		—		3	0
Cavalry FC II	Total		22	1	0	0	0	0	0	0	22	1
Career total			32	1	0	0	1	0	0	0	33	1
