= Niko Myroniuk =

Canadian soccer player (born 2005)

Personal information
- Full name: Nikolas Martin Myroniuk
- Date of birth: July 21, 2005 (age 21)
- Place of birth: Calgary, Alberta, Canada
- Height: 1.80 m (5 ft 11 in)
- Position: Midfielder

Team information
- Current team: Cavalry FC
- Number: 28

Youth career
- Calgary South West United SC
- Calgary Blizzard SC
- Whitecaps Alberta Academy Centre
- 2020–2022: Vancouver Whitecaps
- 2022–: Cavalry FC

College career
Years	Team	Apps	(Gls)
2023–	Mount Royal Cougars	16	(4)

Senior career*
Years	Team	Apps	(Gls)
2022–	Cavalry FC	46	(2)
2024–	Cavalry FC II	8	(3)
- * Club domestic league appearances and goals as of October 17, 2026

Nikolas Martin Myroniuk (born July 21, 2005) is a Canadian soccer player who plays for Cavalry FC in the Canadian Premier League.

== Early life ==
Myroniuk began playing soccer at age six with Calgary South West United SC. He later played with Calgary Blizzard SC, before joining the Vancouver Whitecaps Alberta Academy Centre. He also played for the Alberta provincial team at U14 and U15 level. In August 2020, he joined the official Vancouver Whitecaps Academy. In 2022, he returned to Alberta and played with the Cavalry FC U20 and also represented Alberta at the 2022 Canada Summer Games, winning a bronze medal.

== University career ==
In 2023, Myroniuk began attending Mount Royal University, where he played for the men's soccer team. On September 9, 2023, he scored his first goal in a victory over the MacEwan Griffins. In late September, he was named the school's Athlete of the Week after netting a brace. At the end of the season, he was named to the Canada West All-Rookie Team.

== Club career ==
=== Cavalry FC ===
In September 2022, he joined Cavalry FC of the Canadian Premier League on a developmental contract. He signed another developmental contract in April 2023. He made his debut on April 20 in a 2023 Canadian Championship match against Pacific FC. During 2023, he spent time with Cavalry U21 side in the exhibition series of League1 Alberta. In April 2024, he signed a U Sports contract with Cavalry, allowing him to maintain his university eligibility. In January 2025, Myroniuk would sign a one year contract extension with Cavalry, with club options for the 2026 and 2027 seasons. Myroniuk would score his first goal for the club in a 6-0 win in the 2025 Canadian Championship against League1 Alberta side Edmonton Scottish. On October 18, 2025, he scored his first CPL goal in a 2-2 draw against Vancouver FC. Myroniuk's option for the 2026 season would be exercised by the club.

== International career ==
In December 2022 and December 2023, Myroniuk was called up to camps with the Canada national futsal team.

== Career statistics ==
As of match played November 21, 2026

Club	Season	League			Playoffs		Domestic Cup		Continental		Total	
Club	Season	Division	Apps	Goals	Apps	Goals	Apps	Goals	Apps	Goals	Apps	Goals
Cavalry FC	2023	Canadian Premier League	1	0	0	0	1	0	—		2	0
Cavalry FC	2024	Canadian Premier League	11	0	0	0	0	0	—		11	0
Cavalry FC	2025	Canadian Premier League	13	1	1	0	2	1	0	0	16	2
Cavalry FC	2026	Canadian Premier League	21	1	2	0	2	0	0	0	25	1
Cavalry FC	Total		46	2	3	0	5	1	0	0	54	3
Cavalry FC II	2024	League1 Alberta	3	0	—		—		—		3	0
Cavalry FC II	2025	League1 Alberta	5	3	—		—		—		5	3
Cavalry FC II	Total		8	3	0	0	0	0	0	0	8	3
Career total			54	5	3	0	5	1	0	0	62	5
