= Levi Laing =

English footballer (born 2003)

Personal information
- Full name: Levi Alexander Laing
- Date of birth: 12 April 2003 (age 23)
- Place of birth: Kingston upon Thames, England
- Height: 1.88 m (6 ft 2 in)
- Position: Centre-back

Team information
- Current team: Cavalry FC
- Number: 15

Youth career
- 2008–2014: Hampton & Richmond Borough
- 2014–2016: Brentford
- 2016–2021: Arsenal
- 2021–2023: West Ham United

Senior career*
Years	Team	Apps	(Gls)
2023–2025	West Ham United	0	(0)
2024–2025	→ Cheltenham Town (loan)	6	(0)
2025	Aldershot Town	4	(0)
2025–	Cavalry FC	35	(2)

International career
2018	England U15	1	(0)
2018	England U16	1	(0)
- * Club domestic league appearances and goals as of October 25, 2026

Levi Alexander Laing (born 12 April 2003) is an English professional footballer who plays as a centre-back for Cavalry FC in the Canadian Premier League.

== Club career ==
Laing is a youth product of the academies of Hampton & Richmond Borough and Brentford, before moving to Arsenal's youth academy in 2016. He signed a scholarship contract with Arsenal in July 2019.

Laing joined West Ham United on trial in January 2021, and was formally released by Arsenal in the summer of 2021. He signed a professional contract with West Ham United on 1 July 2021 for 2 seasons. He made his senior and professional debut with West Ham United as a substitute in a 4–0 UEFA Europa Conference League win over AEK Larnaca on 16 March 2023.

On 26 July 2024, Laing signed for EFL League Two club Cheltenham Town on a season-long loan. In January 2025, he returned to West Ham having made eight appearances for Cheltenham in all competitions, his time with the club having been interrupted by a knee injury sustained in October 2024.

On 22 March 2025, Laing joined Aldershot Town as a non-contract player.

On 14 April 2025, Laing joined Canadian Premier League side Cavalry FC, signing a two-year guaranteed contract with an option for a third year. He made his debut for Cavalry FC on 26 April against Atlético Ottawa, being substituted in after 70 minutes and picking up a yellow card in a 1–3 loss at home. On 25 May 2025, he scored his first ever professional goal in a 4–0 league victory against Valour FC.

== International career ==
Laing is a youth international for England, having played up to the England U16s.

== Playing style ==
Laing is a centre-back who also plays as a right-back or defensive midfielder as needed.

== Career statistics ==
=== Club ===
As of match played November 21, 2026

Appearances and goals by club, season and competition
Club	Season	League			National Cup		League Cup		Continental		Other		Total	
Club	Season	Division	Apps	Goals	Apps	Goals	Apps	Goals	Apps	Goals	Apps	Goals	Apps	Goals
Arsenal U21	2020–21	–	–		–		–		–		2 (Note: Appearances in EFL Trophy)	0	2	0
West Ham United	2021–22	Premier League	0	0	0	0	0	0	–		1	0	1	0
West Ham United	2022–23	Premier League	0	0	0	0	0	0	1 (Note: Appearance in UEFA Europa Conference League)	0	3	0	4	0
West Ham United	2023–24	Premier League	0	0	0	0	0	0	0	0	5	0	5	0
West Ham United	2024–25	Premier League	0	0	0	0	0	0	–		0	0	0	0
West Ham United	Total		0	0	0	0	0	0	1	0	9	0	10	0
Cheltenham Town (loan)	2024–25	League Two	6	0	0	0	1	0	–		1	0	8	0
Aldershot Town	2024–25	National League	4	0	–		–		–		0	0	4	0
Cavalry FC	2025	Canadian Premier League	20	1	3	0	0	0	0	0	2	0	25	1
Cavalry FC	2026	Canadian Premier League	15	1	3	0	0	0	0	0	3	0	21	1
Cavalry FC	Total		35	2	6	0	0	0	0	0	5	0	46	2
Career total			45	2	6	0	1	0	1	0	17	0	70	2
