= Eryk Kobza =

Canadian soccer player (born 2001)

- Kobza in 2026

Personal information
- Date of birth: November 23, 2001 (age 24)
- Place of birth: North Vancouver, British Columbia, Canada
- Height: 6 ft 3 in (1.91 m)
- Position: Center back

Team information
- Current team: Cavalry FC
- Number: 24

Youth career
- 2007–2012: North Vancouver FC
- 2012–2013: Vancouver Whitecaps FC
- 2013–2014: Mountain United FC
- 2014–2019: Vancouver Whitecaps FC

College career
| Years | Team | Apps | (Gls) |
| 2019–2022 | Calgary Dinos | 41 | (7) |

Senior career*
| Years | Team | Apps | (Gls) |
| 2020–2021 | Sokół Ostróda | 6 | (1) |
| 2021 | Podlasie Biała Podlaska | 20 | (1) |
| 2023– | Cavalry FC | 88 | (5) |
- * Club domestic league appearances and goals as of October 25, 2026

Eryk Kobza (born November 23, 2001) is a Canadian professional soccer player who plays as a center back for Canadian Premier League club Cavalry FC.

== Early life ==
Kobza began playing youth soccer at age five with North Vancouver FC. In 2012, he joined the Vancouver Whitecaps Academy, before joining Mountain United FC in 2013. In 2014, he returned to the Whitecaps academy. In March 2016, he was named the Whitecaps FC Youth Player of the Month.

== University career ==
In 2019, he began attending the University of Calgary, where he played for the men's soccer team. He made his collegiate debut and first start in the season opener on August 24, 2019 against the Mount Royal Cougars. He scored his first goals on September 13, netting a brace in a 3–2 victory over the UFV Cascades, including the first goal just 20 seconds into the match. That season, he helped the team reach the men’s soccer National Championship for the first time in 40 years, as well as earning the school's male Rookie of the Year honours (across all sports), and was also named to the Canada West All-Rookie Team. In 2022, he was named team captain. On October 16, 2022, he scored another brace in a 3–2 win over the Saskatchewan Huskies. At the end of the 2022 season, he was named a Canada West Second Team All-Star.

== Club career ==
In August 2020, he signed with Sokół Ostróda in the Polish II liga. He made his debut on September 19 against Olimpia Grudziądz, in a substitute appearance. In the next match on September 26, he scored his first goal in a 2–0 victory over Znicz Pruszków. On January 6, 2021, it was announced that he had terminated his contract with the club by mutual consent.

In late January 2021, he signed with Podlasie Biała Podlaska in the III liga.

=== Cavalry FC ===
At the 2023 CPL-U Sports Draft, Kobza was selected in the second round (14th overall) by Cavalry FC. In April 2023, he signed a U Sports developmental contract with the club. He scored his first CPL goal on July 8, in a 2–1 victory over Pacific FC. In July 2023, Kobza signed a professional deal with Cavalry until the end of the 2025 season, with a club option for 2026. Kobza's option for the 2026 season would be exercised by the club.

== International career ==
Kobza was born in Canada to Polish parents. In February 2016, he was called up to a training camp with the Canada U15 team.

== Career statistics ==
As of match played November 1, 2026

| Club | Season | League | | | Playoffs | | Domestic Cup | | Continental | | Total | |
| Club | Season | Division | Apps | Goals | Apps | Goals | Apps | Goals | Apps | Goals | Apps | Goals |
|---|---|---|---|---|---|---|---|---|---|---|---|---|
| Sokół Ostróda | 2020–21 | II liga | 6 | 1 | — | | 0 | 0 | — | | 6 | 1 |
| Podlasie Biała Podlaska | 2020–21 | III liga, group IV | 20 | 1 | — | | — | | — | | 20 | 1 |
| Cavalry FC | 2023 | Canadian Premier League | 26 | 2 | 3 | 0 | 0 | 0 | — | | 29 | 2 |
| Cavalry FC | 2024 | Canadian Premier League | 18 | 0 | 2 | 0 | 3 | 0 | 2 | 0 | 25 | 0 |
| Cavalry FC | 2025 | Canadian Premier League | 19 | 2 | 3 | 0 | 1 | 0 | 2 | 0 | 25 | 2 |
| Cavalry FC | 2026 | Canadian Premier League | 25 | 1 | 1 | 0 | 3 | 0 | 0 | 0 | 29 | 1 |
| Cavalry FC | Total | | 88 | 5 | 9 | 0 | 7 | 0 | 4 | 0 | 108 | 5 |
| Career total | | | 114 | 7 | 9 | 0 | 7 | 0 | 4 | 0 | 134 | 7 |
