= Owen Graham-Roache =

Canadian soccer player (born 2008)

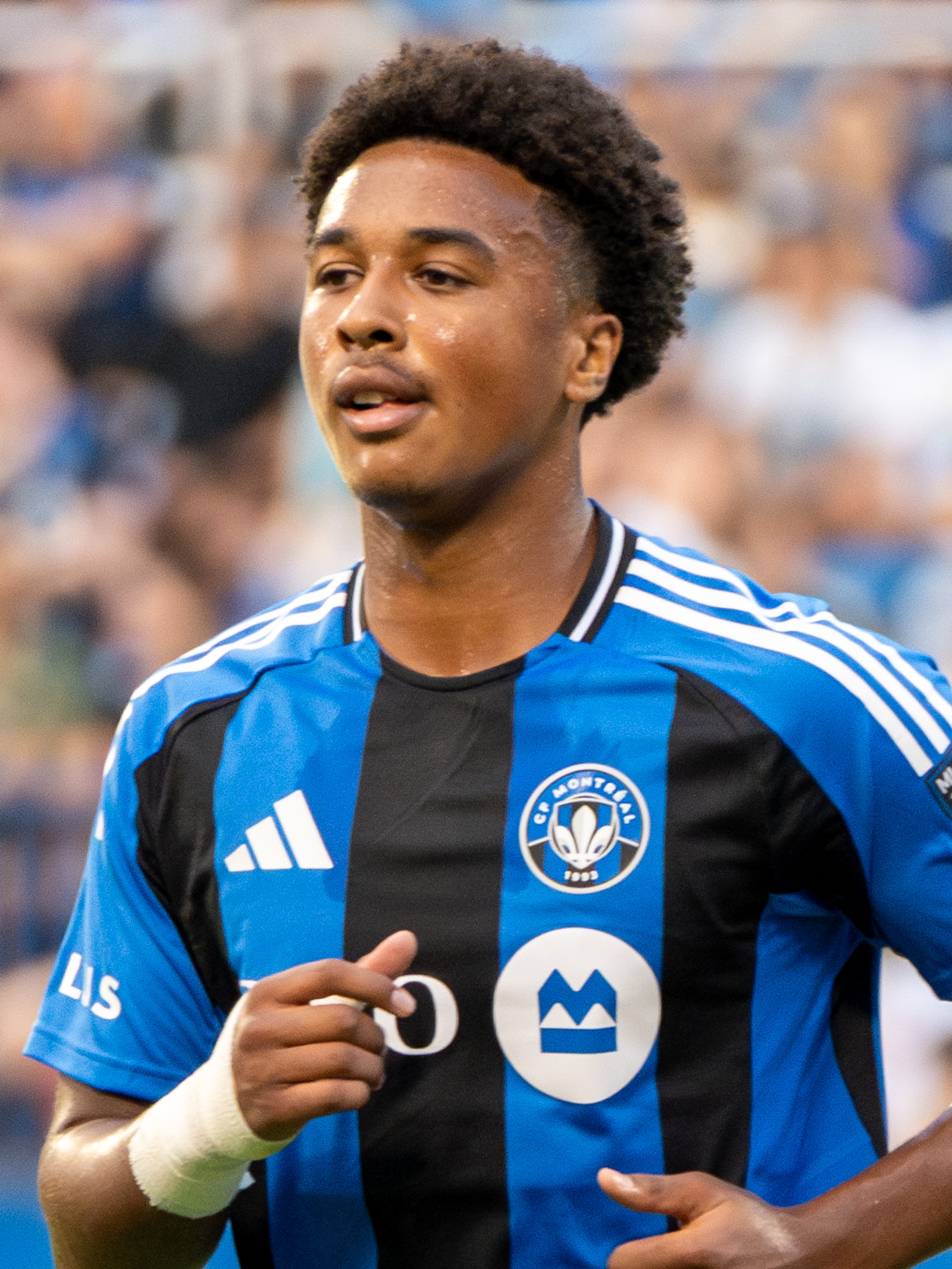
- Graham-Roache with CF Montréal in 2025

Personal information
- Full name: Owen Graham-Roache
- Date of birth: 11 February 2008 (age 18)
- Place of birth: Montreal, Quebec, Canada
- Height: 1.83 m (6 ft 0 in)
- Position: Striker

Team information
- Current team: Cavalry FC (on loan from CF Montréal))
- Number: 35

Youth career
- Rapides de LaSalle
- 2019–2020: CF Montréal

Senior career*
Years	Team	Apps	(Gls)
2025–	CF Montréal	8	(0)
2026–	→ Cavalry FC (loan)	5	(0)

International career^{‡}
2025	Canada U17	6	(2)
2026–	Canada U20	12	(8)
- * Club domestic league appearances and goals as of November 2, 2026 ‡ National team caps and goals as of August 8, 2026

Owen Graham-Roache (born February 11, 2008) is a Canadian professional footballer who plays as a striker for Canadian Premier League club Cavalry FC, on loan from Major League Soccer club CF Montréal.

== Club career ==
=== CF Montréal ===
A youth product of the Rapides de LaSalle, Graham-Roache joined the youth academy of CF Montréal on 2020 where he finished his development. In January 2025, he started training with the senior CF Montréal team for the preseason. On 5 February 2025, he signed his first professional contract with CF Montréal until 2026, with options extending to 2029. He made his senior and professional debut with CF Montréal as a late substitute in a 1–0 Major League Soccer loss to the New York Red Bulls on 27 April 2025.

=== Cavalry FC ===
In September 2026, Graham-Roache would be loaned to Canadian Premier League club Cavalry FC for the remainder of the 2026 season.

== International career ==
Born in Canada, Graham-Roache is of Jamaican descent. He was first called up by Canada for the CONCACAF Under-17 World Cup Qualification. He debuted February 9, 2025 against Turks and Caicos. He missed the rest of the tournament due to injury.

== Career statistics ==
As of match played November 7, 2026

Appearances and goals by club, season and competition
Club	Season	League			Playoffs		Can. Championship		Continental		Other		Total	
Club	Season	Division	Apps	Goals	Apps	Goals	Apps	Goals	Apps	Goals	Apps	Goals	Apps	Goals
CF Montréal	2025	Major League Soccer	6	0	0	0	3	0	—		2 (Note: Appearances in Leagues Cup)	0	11	0
CF Montréal	2026	Major League Soccer	2	0	0	0	2	0	—		0	0	4	0
CF Montréal	Total		8	0	0	0	5	0	—		2	0	15	0
Cavalry FC (loan)	2026	Canadian Premier League	4	0	2	0	0	0	0	0	0	0	6	0
Career total			12	0	2	0	5	0	0	0	2	0	21	0
