= Goteh Ntignee =

Beninese footballer (born 2002)

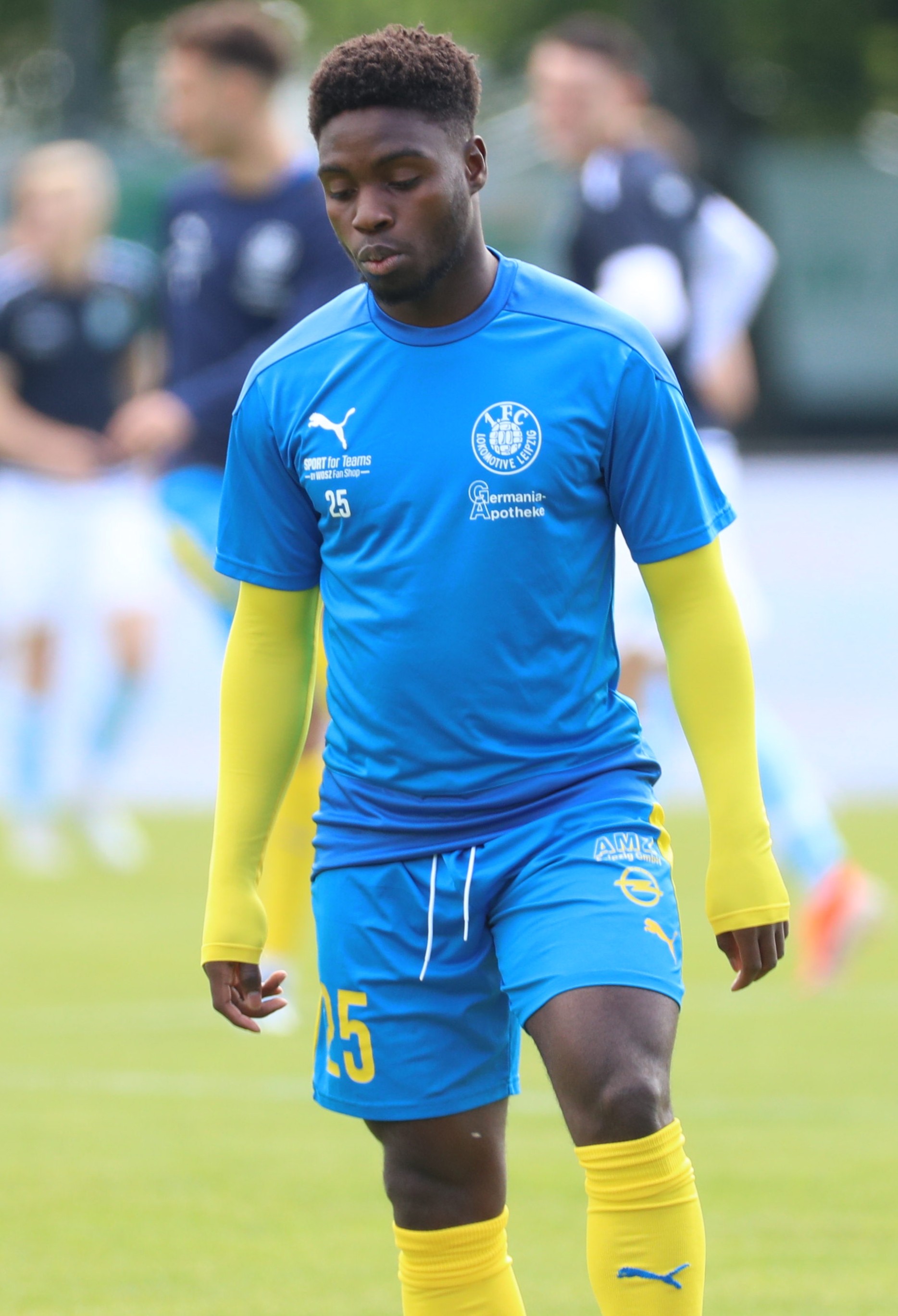
- Ntignee in 2021 with Lokomotive Leipzig

Personal information
- Date of birth: May 10, 2002 (age 24)
- Place of birth: Kpomassè, Benin
- Height: 1.75 m (5 ft 9 in)
- Position: Forward

Team information
- Current team: Cavalry FC

Youth career
- Grasslands SA
- Eastside Memorial FC
- Pacific Elite Soccer Institute

Senior career*
Years	Team	Apps	(Gls)
2019	Victoria Highlanders	8	(4)
2020–2022	Lokomotive Leipzig	2	(0)
2022	FC Grimma	12	(0)
2022–2024	Cavalry FC	18	(2)
2023–2024	→ Annecy II (loan)		
2024–2025	Annecy	1	(0)
2024–2025	Annecy II		
2025–	Cavalry FC	32	(7)
- * Club domestic league appearances and goals as of October 25, 2026

Goteh Ntignee (born 10 May 2002) is a Beninese professional footballer player who plays as a forward for Cavalry FC in the Canadian Premier League.

== Early life ==
Born in Kpomassè, Benin, Ntignee moved to Canada at age four, first settling in Moose Jaw, Saskatchewan, before later moving to Brooks, Alberta and then Coaldale, Alberta, at ages nine and ten respectively. Ntignee began playing youth soccer with Grasslands SA at age nine. Afterwards, he played with Eastside Memorial FC, later joining the Pacific Elite Soccer Institute. In 2018/19, he played at the senior amateur level with Westcatle United in the Vancouver Island Soccer League winning the league title, while winning the finals MVP and finishing as a finalist for Rookie of the Year.

== Club career ==
In April 2019, Ntignee joined the Victoria Highlanders in USL League Two. He scored four goals in eight games during the 2019 season.

In August 2020, he signed with German Regionalliga Nordost club FC Lokomotive Leipzig.

On January 31, 2022, he moved to NOFV-Oberliga Süd club FC Grimma.

On August 10, 2022, Ntignee signed a multi-year contract with Canadian Premier League club Cavalry FC. On October 8, he made his debut in the final game of the season against Pacific FC, helping set up the winning goal by Ben Fisk. On June 24, he scored his first goal for the club against York United FC. He was named to the CPL Team of the Week on three occasions that season.

On August 31, 2023, Ntignee joined French Ligue 2 side Annecy on an initial loan for the remainder of the 2023–24 season, with the deal set to become permanent at the end of the 2023–24 season. The transfer will be for a reported fee of $500,000 with additional add-ons, setting a new Canadian Premier League record for the league's highest transfer fee. After nursing an injury upon his arrival, he initially made a bench appearance as an unused substitute against Amiens on October 21, before appearing for the Annecy second team on October 22 against FC Échirolles in the sixth-tier Régional 1, in his club debut. He spent the remainder of the season with the second team, never appearing for the first team. on 16 November 2024, he scored his first goals for Annecy, netting a hat trick in a Coupe de France match against sixth tier side FC Vesoul. He continued to spend the bulk of his time playing with the second team.

In July 2025, he returned to Cavalry FC, signing through the 2027 season, with an option for 2028.

== International career ==
Ntingee was born in Benin and raised in Canada, and is of Nigerian descent. In 2017, Ntingee attended a development camp with the Canada U15 team.

In 2019, he attended a camp with the Nigeria U17 team ahead of the 2019 FIFA U-17 World Cup.

== Career statistics ==
As of match played October 25, 2026

Appearances and goals by club, season and competition
Club	Season	League			Playoffs		National cup		Other		Total	
Club	Season	Division	Apps	Goals	Apps	Goals	Apps	Goals	Apps	Goals	Apps	Goals
Victoria Highlanders FC	2019	USL League Two	8	4	—		—		—		8	4
1. FC Lokomotive Leipzig	2020–21	Regionalliga Nordost	2	0	—		—		0 (Note: Appearance(s) in Saxony Cup)	0	2	0
1. FC Lokomotive Leipzig	2021–22	Regionalliga Nordost	0	0	—		0	0	1	0	1	0
1. FC Lokomotive Leipzig	Total		2	0	0	0	0	0	1	0	3	0
FC Grimma	2021–22	NOFV-Oberliga Süd	12	0	—		—		0	0	12	0
Cavalry FC	2022	Canadian Premier League	1	0	1	0	0	0	—		2	0
Cavalry FC	2023	Canadian Premier League	17	2	0	0	1	0	—		18	2
Cavalry FC	Total		18	2	1	0	1	0	0	0	20	2
FC Annecy (loan)	2023–24	Ligue 2	0	0	—		0	0	—		0	0
FC Annecy	2024–25	Ligue 2	1	0	—		2	3	—		3	3
Cavalry FC	2025	Canadian Premier League	13	4	3	0	0	0	0	0	16	4
Cavalry FC	2026	Canadian Premier League	19	3	0	0	3	0	0	0	22	3
Cavalry FC	Total		32	7	3	0	3	0	0	0	38	7
Career total			72	13	4	0	6	3	1	0	83	16
