= Bradley Kamdem =

French footballer (born 1994)

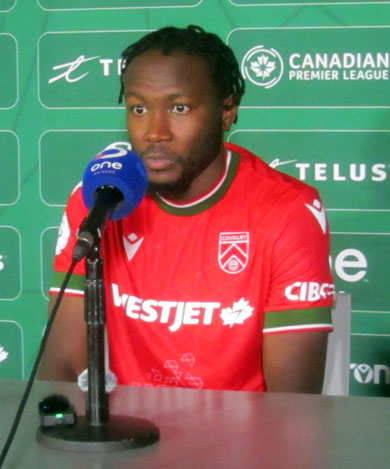
- Kamdem in 2024

Personal information
- Full name: Bradley Steede Kamdem Fewo
- Date of birth: 18 August 1994 (age 32)
- Place of birth: Paris, France
- Height: 1.83 m (6 ft 0 in)
- Position: Defender

Team information
- Current team: Cavalry FC
- Number: 5

Youth career
- Calgary Chinooks SC

College career
Years	Team	Apps	(Gls)
2012	Huntington Foresters		
2013–2015	UNLV Rebels	49	(4)

Senior career*
Years	Team	Apps	(Gls)
2015	Calgary Foothills	8	(0)
2016–2017	Rochester Rhinos	49	(1)
2018	Fresno FC	20	(0)
2019	Saint Louis FC	19	(0)
2020–2021	Atlanta United 2	29	(1)
2022–2023	Valletta	20	(0)
2023–	Cavalry FC	79	(3)
- * Club domestic league appearances and goals as of October 25, 2026

Bradley Steede Kamdem Fewo (born 18 August 1994) is a French professional footballer who plays as a left back for Cavalry FC in the Canadian Premier League.

== Early life ==
Kamdem was born in Paris, France to Cameroonian parents, but later moved to Montreal, Canada, before later moving to Calgary with his family as a child. He played youth soccer with the Calgary Chinooks SC.

== College career ==
In 2012, Kamdem began attending Huntington University, where he played for the men's soccer team. At the end of the season, he was named to the Crossroads League Second Team All-Conference.

In 2013, Kamdem began attending the University of Nevada, Las Vegas, where he played for the men's soccer team. He scored his first goal on November 9, 2013 against the Cal State Bakersfield Roadrunners. In 2014, he helped them win the Western Athletic Conference tournament championship, scoring in the penalty shootout. In September 2015, he was named the WAC Men's Soccer Defensive Player of the Week, which was his first career collegiate weekly honour, and was also named the UNLV Outstanding Rebel of the Week. That season, he also earned Academic All-District VIII Men's Soccer team honours, was named to the NSCAA All-West Region Second Team, and the NSCAA Scholar All-America Third Team. Over his three season with UNLV, he scored four goals in 49 games.

== Club career ==
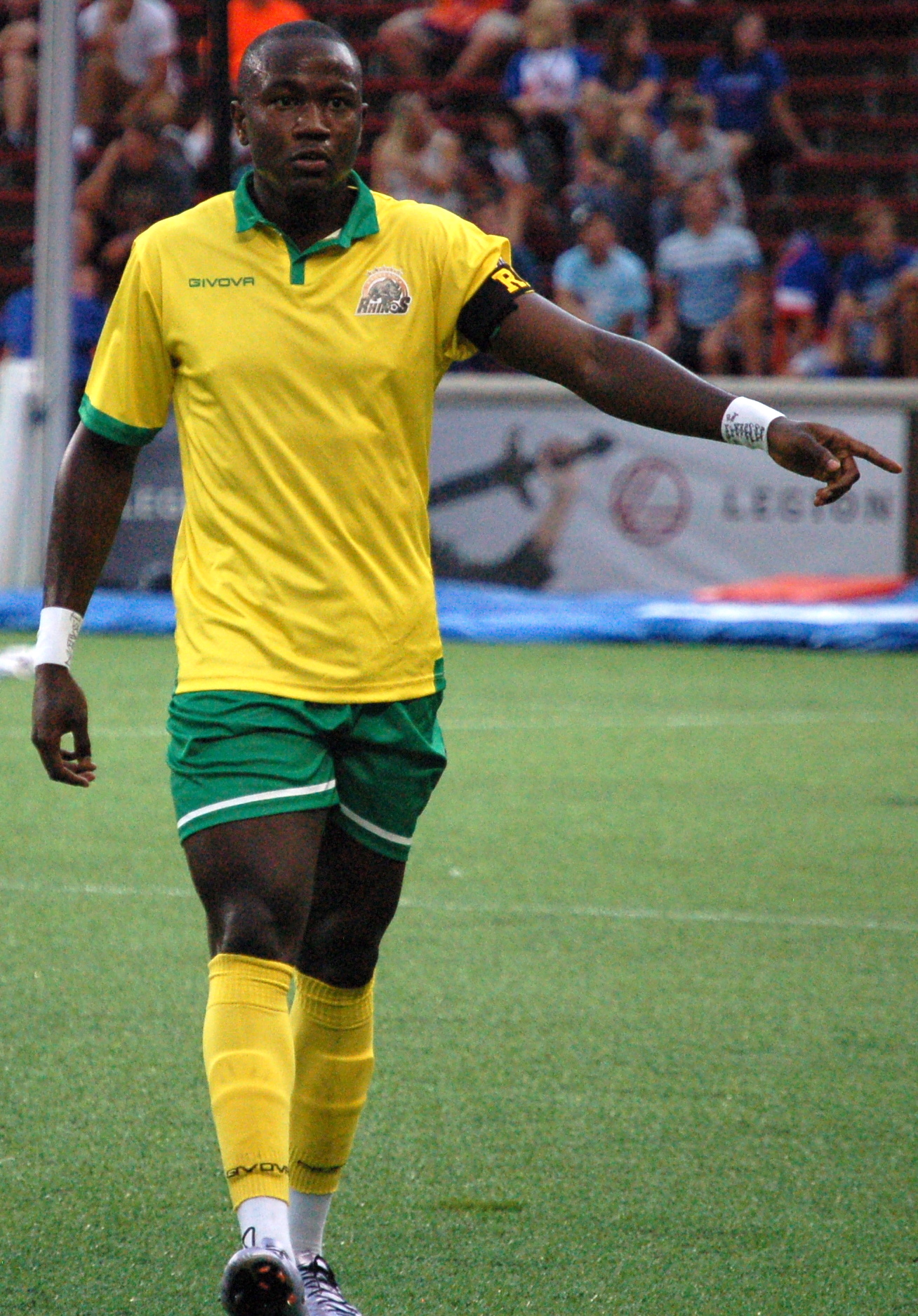
Kamdem playing for Rochester Rhinos in 2016

In 2015, Kamdem played with Calgary Foothills FC in the Premier Development League.

At the 2016 MLS SuperDraft, Kamdem was selected in the third round (58th overall) by the Colorado Rapids. However, in March 2016, he would instead sign with USL club Rochester Rhinos for the 2016 season. On June 3, 2017, he scored his first professional goal in a 1-0 victory over FC Cincinnati, which also earned him USL Team of the Week honours.

In January 2018, he joined Fresno FC.

In January 2019, he signed with Saint Louis FC.

In January 2020, he signed with Atlanta United 2 of the USL Championship. He returned for the 2021 season, serving as one of the team's two captains. On June 9, 2021, he scored his first goal for Atlanta, in a 2-2 draw with Sporting Kansas City II, which was his first goal since 2017.

In July 2022, he signed with Valletta of the Maltese Premier League.

In April 2023, he joined Canadian Premier League side Cavalry FC, returning to his hometown of Calgary, and re-uniting with his Foothills coach Tommy Wheeldon Jr., with whom he had kept in contact with throughout his career. In January 2025, Kamdem would sign a 3 year contract extension with cavalry, keeping him at the club through the 2027 season.

== Career statistics ==
As of November 21, 2026

Club	Season	League			Playoffs		Domestic Cup		Continental		Total	
Club	Season	Division	Apps	Goals	Apps	Goals	Apps	Goals	Apps	Goals	Apps	Goals
Calgary Foothills FC	2015	Premier Development League	8	0	—		—		—		8	0
Rochester Rhinos	2016	USL	25	0	2	0	1	0	—		28	0
Rochester Rhinos	2017	USL	24	1	0	0	2	0	—		26	1
Rochester Rhinos	Total		49	1	2	0	3	0	0	0	54	1
Fresno FC	2018	USL	20	0	—		2	0	—		22	0
Saint Louis FC	2019	USL Championship	19	0	—		2	0	—		21	0
Atlanta United 2	2020	USL Championship	1	0	—		—		—		1	0
Atlanta United 2	2021	USL Championship	28	1	—		—		—		28	1
Atlanta United 2	Total		29	1	0	0	0	0	0	0	29	1
Valletta	2022–23	Maltese Premier League	20	0	—		2	0	—		22	0
Cavalry FC	2023	Canadian Premier League	22	0	3	0	0	0	—		25	0
Cavalry FC	2024	Canadian Premier League	19	1	2	0	3	0	2	0	26	1
Cavalry FC	2025	Canadian Premier League	14	0	2	0	2	0	2	0	20	0
Cavalry FC	2026	Canadian Premier League	24	2	3	0	3	0	0	0	30	2
Cavalry FC	Total		79	3	10	0	8	0	4	0	101	3
Career total			224	6	12	0	17	0	4	0	257	6
