= Owen Antoniuk =

Canadian soccer player (born 2002)

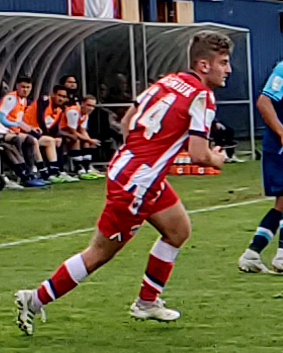
- Antoniuk with Atlético Ottawa in 2022

Personal information
- Full name: Robert Owen Antoniuk
- Date of birth: August 26, 2002 (age 24)
- Place of birth: Calgary, Alberta, Canada
- Height: 1.70 m (5 ft 7 in)
- Position: Winger

Team information
- Current team: Cavalry FC
- Number: 19

Youth career
- Rosedale Community Association
- Calgary Blizzard SC
- Calgary Foothills SC
- Vancouver Whitecaps

College career
Years	Team	Apps	(Gls)
2023–	Calgary Dinos	31	(18)

Senior career*
Years	Team	Apps	(Gls)
2022	Whitecaps FC 2	13	(3)
2022	→ Atlético Ottawa (loan)	5	(0)
2023	Windsor City FC	20	(13)
2024	Calgary Foothills FC	10	(10)
2025–	Cavalry FC II	10	(9)
2025–	Cavalry FC	19	(3)
- * Club domestic league appearances and goals as of October 3, 2026 ‡ National team caps and goals as of November 2, 2019

Robert Owen Antoniuk (born August 26, 2002) is a Canadian soccer player.

== Early life ==
Antoniuk was born in Calgary, Alberta. He began playing soccer at age five with the Rosedale Community Association. Afterwards, he played with Calgary Blizzard SC and Calgary Foothills SC. He then joined the Whitecaps FC Alberta Academy Centre, before moving to the official Whitecaps FC Academy in 2018. In 2021, he joined the Vancouver Whitecaps FC U-23, while also getting the opportunity to train with the first team.

== University career ==
In 2023, Antoniuk began attending the University of Calgary, where he played for the men's soccer team. At the end of the 2023 season, he was named an Academic All-Canadian. On August 24, 2024, he scored his first goal in a victory over the Saskatchewan Huskies. On September 22, he scored a hat trick against the UFV Cascades. At the end of the 2024 season, he was named a Canada West First Team All-Star and a U Sports Second Team All-Canadian. At the end of the 2025 season, he was again named a Canada West First Team All Star and was also named a U Sports First Team All-Canadian.

== Club career ==
In March 2022, he signed a professional contract with Whitecaps FC 2 in MLS Next Pro. He made his professional debut on March 26, against Houston Dynamo 2. He scored his first goals on April 10, when he scored two goals against Portland Timbers 2, converting a penalty kick in the 75th minute, before scoring a 95th minute equalizer.

In July 2022, he was loaned to Atlético Ottawa of the Canadian Premier League. After the season, Whitecaps 2 declined his club option for 2023.

In 2023, he played with Windsor City FC in League1 Ontario.

In 2024, Antoniuk signed with League1 Alberta club Calgary Foothills FC. He finished as the league's top scorer in 2024 with ten goals.

At the 2025 CPL–U Sports Draft, Antoniuk was selected in the second round (16th overall) by Cavalry FC. In February 2025, he signed a short-term contract with the club for their CONCACAF Champions Cup matches. In April 2025, he signed a U Sports contract with the club for the 2025 season, allowing him to maintain his university eligibility. In August 2025, he departed the club to return to university, as per the terms of his U Sports contract, with the club retaining his rights for the 2026 season.

== International career ==
In 2014, he represented Canada at the U12 Danone Nations Cup.

In 2017, he was selected to join a training camp for the Canada U15 team. In May 2017, he attended the Canada Soccer U15 Showcase.

== Career statistics ==
As of match played November 1, 2026

Club	Season	League			Playoffs		Domestic Cup		Other		Total	
Club	Season	Division	Apps	Goals	Apps	Goals	Apps	Goals	Apps	Goals	Apps	Goals
Whitecaps FC 2	2022	MLS Next Pro	13	3	—		—		—		13	3
Atlético Ottawa (loan)	2022	Canadian Premier League	5	0	0	0	0	0	—		5	0
Windsor City FC	2023	League1 Ontario	20	13	—		—		—		20	13
Calgary Foothills FC	2024	League1 Alberta	10	10	1	1	—		—		11	11
Cavalry FC II	2025	Alberta Premier League	7	7	0	0	—		—		7	7
Cavalry FC II	2026	Alberta Premier League	3	2	0	0	—		—		3	2
Cavalry FC II	Total		10	9	0	0	0	0	0	0	10	9
Cavalry FC	2025	Canadian Premier League	4	0	0	0	2	0	0	0	6	0
Cavalry FC	2026	Canadian Premier League	15	3	1	0	0	0	0	0	16	3
Cavalry FC	Total		19	3	1	0	2	0	0	0	22	3
Career total			77	38	2	1	2	0	0	0	81	39

== Honours ==
Atlético Ottawa

- Canadian Premier League
  - Regular Season: 2022
