= James McGlinchey =

Canadian soccer player (born 2007)

Personal information
- Full name: James McGlinchey
- Date of birth: May 18, 2007 (age 19)
- Place of birth: Calgary, Alberta, Canada
- Height: 1.80 m (5 ft 11 in)
- Position: Midfielder

Team information
- Current team: Cavalry FC
- Number: 30

Youth career
- 2015-2024: Calgary Foothills
- Whitecaps FC Academy

Senior career*
Years	Team	Apps	(Gls)
2024–	Cavalry FC II	35	(2)
2024–	Cavalry FC	8	(0)

International career^{‡}
2026–	Canada U20	1	(0)
- * Club domestic league appearances and goals as of October 17, 2026 ‡ National team caps and goals as of February 26, 2026

James McGlinchey (born May 18, 2007) is a Canadian soccer player who plays as a midfielder for Cavalry FC of the Canadian Premier League.

== Early life ==
McGlinchey played youth soccer with the Calgary Foothills and the Whitecaps FC Academy. At Canadian Soccer's inaugural U-17 Player-Development Program Championship held in Edmonton, Alberta in 2024, McGlinchey captained the Calgary Foothills team. After being identified at the Cavalry FC Southern Alberta ID program, he then went on to join the Cavalry FC U21 development squad, playing in League1 Alberta.

== Club career ==
=== Cavalry FC ===
In September 2024, it was announced McGlinchey signed a developmental contract with Cavalry FC in the Canadian Premier League, along with two other players from the Cavalry FC U21 squad, Neven Fewster and Josh Belbin. McGlinchey would make his debut for the club coming in as a substitute in a 6-0 win in the 2025 Canadian Championship against League1 Alberta side Edmonton Scottish. McGlinchey made his second club appearance, and first Canadian Premier League appearance on June 8, 2025 in a 2-1 victory against York United FC, after coming off the bench at the 98th minute for Tobias Warschewski.

On September 4, 2025, McGlinchey signed an Exceptional Young Player contract through the 2027 season, with a club option for 2028.

== International career ==
In February 2026, McGlinchey would be called up to the Canada U-20 team for the 2026 CONCACAF U-20 Championship qualifying tournament.

== Career statistics ==
As of match played October 17, 2026

Club	Season	League			Playoffs		Domestic Cup		Total	
Club	Season	Division	Apps	Goals	Apps	Goals	Apps	Goals	Apps	Goals
Cavalry FC II	2024	Alberta Premier League	12	0	0	0	0	0	12	0
Cavalry FC II	2025	Alberta Premier League	13	1	0	0	0	0	13	1
Cavalry FC II	2026	Alberta Premier League	10	1	0	0	0	0	10	1
Cavalry FC II	Total		35	2	0	0	0	0	35	2
Cavalry FC	2025	Canadian Premier League	1	0	0	0	1	0	2	0
Cavalry FC	2026	Canadian Premier League	7	0	0	0	0	0	7	0
Cavalry FC	Total		8	0	0	0	1	0	9	0
Career total			43	2	0	0	1	0	44	2
