= 2023 Cavalry FC season =

Cavalry FC
2023 season
- President: Ian Allison
- Head coach: Tommy Wheeldon Jr.
- Stadium: ATCO Field
- Canadian Premier League: 1st
- CPL playoffs: Runners-up
- Canadian Championship: Preliminary round
- Top goalscorer: League: Myer Bevan (11); All: Myer Bevan (12)

The 2023 Cavalry FC season was the fifth season in the history of Cavalry FC. In addition to the Canadian Premier League, the club also competed in the Canadian Championship.

Cavalry FC won the 2023 CPL Shield, and qualified for the 2024 CONCACAF Champions Cup, but lost the 2023 CPL final against Forge FC.

== Squad ==
As of August 31, 2023

No.	Player	Nationality	Position(s)	Date of birth (age)	Previous club
Goalkeepers
1	Marco Carducci	(Canada)	GK	September 24, 1996 (aged 27)	(Canada) Calgary Foothills
21	Sterling Kerr	(Canada)	GK		(Canada) Mount Royal Cougars
31	Joseph Holliday	(Canada)	GK	January 8, 2005 (aged 18)	(Canada) FC Edmonton
Defenders
2	Roberto Alarcón	(Spain)	RB	April 21, 1998 (aged 25)	(Romania) Universitatea Cluj
3	Callum Montgomery	(Canada)	CB	May 14, 1997 (aged 26)	(United States) Minnesota United
4	Daan Klomp	(Netherlands)	CB	August 10, 1998 (aged 25)	(Netherlands) NAC Breda
5	Bradley Kamdem	(France)	LB / CB	August 18, 1994 (aged 29)	(Malta) Valletta
12	Tom Field	(Republic of Ireland)	LB	March 14, 1997 (aged 26)	(Canada) Calgary Foothills
15	Udoka Chima	(Nigeria)	CB	February 1, 2002 (aged 21)	(England) Kings Langley
24	Eryk Kobza	(Canada)	CB / DM	November 23, 2001 (aged 22)	(Canada) Calgary Dinos
29	Niko Myroniuk	(Canada)	CM	July 21, 2005 (aged 18)	(Canada) Cavalry U-20
33	Fraser Aird	(Canada)	RB / RW / ST	February 2, 1995 (aged 28)	(Canada) FC Edmonton
	Michael Harms	(Canada)	CB	December 31, 2005 (aged 18)	(Canada) Calgary Foothills
Midfielders
6	Charlie Trafford	(Canada)	DM	May 24, 1992 (aged 31)	(Wales) Wrexham
8	Jesse Daley	(Australia)	CM	October 16, 1997 (aged 26)	(Australia) Brisbane Roar
10	Sergio Camargo	(Canada)	AM	August 16, 1994 (aged 29)	(Canada) Calgary Foothills
17	Ben Fisk	(Canada)	RW / LW	February 4, 1993 (aged 30)	(Canada) Atlético Ottawa
18	Maël Henry	(Canada)	CM	May 26, 2004 (aged 19)	(Canada) Vancouver FC
26	Shamit Shome	(Canada)	AM	September 5, 1997 (aged 26)	(Canada) FC Edmonton
	William Omoreniye	(Canada)	RW / LW / FB		(Canada) Calgary Dinos
Forwards
7	Ali Musse	(Somalia)	ST / AM	January 1, 1996 (aged 27)	(Germany) 1. FCA Darmstadt
9	Myer Bevan	(New Zealand)	ST	April 23, 1997 (aged 26)	(New Zealand) Auckland City
14	Ethan Beckford	(England)	ST	June 21, 1999 (aged 24)	(Canada) Simcoe County Rovers
19	William Akio	(South Sudan)	CF	July 23, 1998 (aged 25)	(Scotland) Ross County
20	Joe Mason	(Republic of Ireland)	FW	May 13, 1991 (aged 32)	(England) Milton Keynes Dons
23	Gareth Smith-Doyle	(Canada)	FW	June 10, 2002 (aged 21)	(Canada) Cavalry U-20

== Transfers ==
=== In ===
No.	Pos.	Player	From club	Fee/notes	Date	Source
	MF	(Australia) Jesse Daley	(Australia) Brisbane Roar	Free	December 14, 2022	
	MF	(Canada) Shamit Shome	(Canada) Forge FC	Free	January 18, 2023	
	FW	(England) Ethan Beckford	(Canada) Simcoe County Rovers	Free	January 20, 2023	
	DF	(Canada) Callum Montgomery	(United States) Minnesota United	Free	February 9, 2023	
	DF	(Nigeria) Udoka Chima	(England) Kings Langley	Free	February 13, 2023	
	GK	(Canada) Sterling Kerr	(Canada) Mount Royal Cougars	Signed to a U Sports contract	March 17, 2023	
	GK	(Canada) Joseph Holliday	(Canada) FC Edmonton	Signed to a development contract	March 17, 2023	
	MF	(Canada) William Omoreniye	(Canada) Calgary Dinos	Selected 7th overall in the 2023 CPL–U Sports Draft	April 14, 2023	
	DF	(Canada) Eryk Kobza	(Canada) Calgary Dinos	Selected 14th overall in the 2023 CPL–U Sports Draft	April 14, 2023	
	DF	(France) Bradley Kamdem	(Malta) Valletta	Free	April 24, 2023	
	MF	(Canada) Maël Henry	(Canada) Vancouver FC	Free	June 29, 2023	
	FW	(South Sudan) William Akio	(Scotland) Ross County	Undisclosed fee	July 14, 2023	
	DF	(Republic of Ireland) Tom Field	(Canada) Calgary Foothills	Free	November 7, 2022	

==== Draft picks ====
Cavalry FC selected the following players in the 2023 CPL–U Sports Draft. Draft picks are not automatically signed to the team roster. Only those who are signed to a contract will be listed as transfers in.

Round	Selection	Pos.	Player	Nationality	University
1	7	MF	William Omoreniye	Canada	Calgary
2	14	DF	Eryk Kobza	Canada	Calgary

=== Out ===
==== Transferred out ====
No.	Pos.	Player	To club	Fee/notes	Date	Source
3	DF	(Republic of Ireland) Tom Field	(Canada) Calgary Foothills	Contract expired	November 7, 2022	
8	MF	(Canada) Elijah Adekugbe	(Canada) York United	Contract expired	November 7, 2022	
14	MF	(Canada) Joseph Di Chiara	(Canada) Vaughan Azzurri	Contract expired	November 7, 2022	
15	MF	(Canada) Elliot Simmons	(Canada) Vancouver FC	Contract expired	November 7, 2022	
19	FW	(Canada) Anthony Novak	(Canada) Valour FC	Contract expired	November 7, 2022	
21	MF	(Canada) Jean-Aniel Assi	(Canada) CF Montréal	End of loan	November 7, 2022	
24	MF	(Canada) David Norman Jr.	(England) Northampton Town	Contract expired	November 7, 2022	
25	DF	(Canada) Karifa Yao	(Canada) CF Montréal	End of loan	November 7, 2022	
18	DF	(Netherlands) Bradley Vliet	(Canada) Pacific FC	Option declined	December 21, 2022	
12	GK	(Germany) Julian Roloff	(Germany) 1. FC Köln II	Undisclosed sell-on clause	January 13, 2023	
5	DF	(Canada) Mason Trafford	Retired		February 10, 2023	
19	MF	(Haiti) Mikaël Cantave	(Canada) Vancouver FC		June 29, 2023	

==== Loans out ====
No.	Pos.	Player	Loaned to	Fee/notes	Date	Source
11	MF	(Honduras) José Escalante	(Honduras) F.C. Motagua	One-year loan	July 10, 2023	
30	FW	(Benin) Goteh Ntignee	(France) FC Annecy	One-year loan, with option to buy for undisclosed fee	August 31, 2023	

== Competitions ==
=== Overview ===
Competition	First match	Last match	Starting round	Final position	Record							
Competition	First match	Last match	Starting round	Final position	Pld	W	D	L	GF	GA	GD	Win %
Canadian Premier League	April 15	October 7	Matchday 1	Winners	28	16	7	5	46	27	+19	57.14
CPL Playoffs	October 14	October 28	First semifinal	Final	3	1	0	2	4	5	−1	33.33
Canadian Championship	April 20	April 20	Preliminary round	Preliminary round	1	0	1	0	1	1	+0	0.00
Total					32	17	8	7	51	33	+18	53.13

Last updated: October 28
Source: Competitions
