= Adam Pearlman (soccer) =

Canadian soccer player (born 2005)

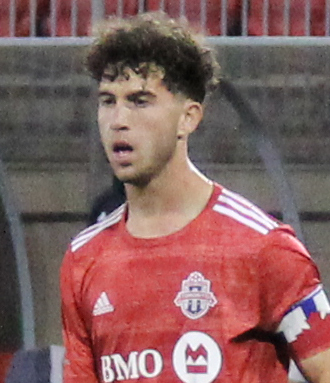
- Pearlman with Toronto FC II in 2023

Personal information
- Date of birth: April 5, 2005 (age 21)
- Place of birth: Johannesburg, South Africa
- Height: 6 ft 2 in (1.88 m)
- Position: Defender

Team information
- Current team: Cavalry FC (on loan from Toronto FC)
- Number: 16

Youth career
- Highlands Park FC
- Glen Shields SC
- Future Soccer Academy
- 2016–2022: Toronto FC

Senior career*
Years	Team	Apps	(Gls)
2021	Toronto FC III	5	(0)
2022–2023	Toronto FC II	45	(0)
2022–2023	→ Toronto FC (loan)	1	(0)
2024–	Toronto FC	0	(0)
2024	→ Toronto FC II (loan)	24	(0)
2025	→ HFX Wanderers (loan)	26	(2)
2026–	→ Cavalry FC (loan)	27	(1)

International career^{‡}
2024	Canada U20	5	(0)
- * Club domestic league appearances and goals as of October 25, 2026 ‡ National team caps and goals as of July 30, 2024

Adam Pearlman (born April 5, 2005) is a professional soccer player who plays as a defender for Cavalry FC in the Canadian Premier League, on loan from Toronto FC in Major League Soccer. Born in South Africa, he represents Canada at youth international level.

== Early life ==
Born in Johannesburg, South Africa, Pearlman began playing soccer at age four with Highlands Park. In 2012, he moved to Thornhill, Ontario, Canada with his family, when he was seven years old, and joined Glen Shields SC, and later Future Soccer Academy. In October 2016, he joined the Toronto FC Academy, playing across the U12 to U19 levels and also participated in the 2018 U13 CONCACAF Champions League. During high school, he attended Crestwood Preparatory College.

== Club career ==
Pearlman played with Toronto FC III in the League1 Ontario Summer Championship in 2021.

In April 2022, he signed a professional contract with Toronto FC II in MLS Next Pro. He made his debut on April 10 against New York City FC II.

On April 15, 2022, he signed a short-term four-day loan with the first team, Toronto FC, ahead of their Major League Soccer match against the Philadelphia Union, but was an unused substitute. He signed additional short-term agreements on May 14 and May 24. He was named to the East roster for the 2022 MLS Next All-Star Game for MLS U18 Academy prospects. On July 4, 2023, he again signed a short-term loan with the first team. He signed additional short-term loans on July 8, August 30, and October 7. He made his Major League Soccer debut for the first team on July 8 against St. Louis City SC.

In February 2024, he signed a homegrown player contract with Toronto FC through the 2027 season, with an option for 2028. He began the 2024 season on loan with the second team. In February 2025, he was loaned to the HFX Wanderers of the Canadian Premier League for the 2025 season. He made his first appearance for the Wanderers on April 5, 2025 against Atlético Ottawa. In March 2026, he was loaned to Cavalry FC in the Canadian Premier League for the 2026 season.

== International career ==
In December 2021, Pearlman was invited to a camp for the Canada U20 team, however the camp was cancelled due to a rise in the COVID-19 pandemic. In May 2022, he was named to the 60-man provisional Canada U20 team for the 2022 CONCACAF U-20 Championship, and in June was named to the extended five-man training squad for the team.

In February 2024, Pearlman was named to the Canada U20 squad for the 2024 CONCACAF Under-20 Championship qualifiers. In July 2024, he was named to the final squad for the tournament.

== Career statistics ==
As of match played November 21, 2026

Appearances and goals by club, season and competition
Club	Season	League			Playoffs		National cup		Continental		Total	
Club	Season	Division	Apps	Goals	Apps	Goals	Apps	Goals	Apps	Goals	Apps	Goals
Toronto FC III	2021	League1 Ontario	5	0	—		–		–		5	0
Toronto FC II	2022	MLS Next Pro	20	0	2	0	–		–		22	0
Toronto FC II	2023	MLS Next Pro	25	0	–		–		–		25	0
Toronto FC II	Total		45	0	2	0	0	0	0	0	47	0
Toronto FC (loan)	2022	Major League Soccer	0	0	–		0	0	–		0	0
Toronto FC (loan)	2023	Major League Soccer	1	0	–		0	0	–		1	0
Toronto FC (loan)	Total		1	0	0	0	0	0	0	0	1	0
Toronto FC II (loan)	2024	MLS Next Pro	24	0	–		–		–		24	0
HFX Wanderers FC (loan)	2025	Canadian Premier League	26	2	1	0	1	0	–		28	2
Cavalry FC (loan)	2026	Canadian Premier League	27	1	1	0	3	0	–		31	1
Career total			128	3	4	0	4	0	0	0	135	3
