= Cavalry FC =

Canadian professional soccer club based in Calgary

Cavalry
- Full name: Cavalry Football Club
- Short name: Cavs
- Founded: May 5, 2018; 8 years ago
- Stadium: ATCO Field
- Capacity: 6,000
- Owner: Spruce Meadows Sports & Entertainment
- President: Ian Allison
- Coach: Tommy Wheeldon Jr.
- League: Canadian Premier League
- 2026: Regular season: 1st Playoffs: Champions
- Website: cavalryfc.canpl.ca
Home colours	Away colours

Cavalry Football Club is a Canadian professional soccer club based in the Calgary metropolitan region of Alberta. The club competes at the top of the Canadian soccer league system in the Canadian Premier League, and plays their home matches at ATCO Field on the grounds of Spruce Meadows in Foothills County.

The team is managed by Tommy Wheeldon Jr. and owned by Spruce Meadows Sports & Entertainment.

== History ==
On May 5, 2018, Calgary was one of four cities accepted by the Canadian Soccer Association for professional club membership.

Cavalry FC was announced on May 17, 2018, as the second team to officially join the Canadian Premier League. Spruce Meadows Sports & Entertainment Group CEO Linda Southern-Heathcott and COO Ian Allison were joined by league commissioner David Clanachan and league president Paul Beirne to unveil the team.

The club's name, crest and colours were all revealed at the event at Spruce Meadows, while Tommy Wheeldon Jr. was announced as head coach and general manager. Plans to renovate existing facilities at Spruce Meadows, resulting in a soccer-specific stadium with a capacity of at least 5,000 seats, were also revealed.

On June 26, 2019, Cavalry FC qualified for the 2019 Canadian Premier League finals by winning the inaugural CPL Spring season. The following month the Cavs became the first CPL club to defeat a Major League Soccer club in the Canadian Championship by upsetting Vancouver Whitecaps FC in 2019 over two-legs. In 2019, Cavalry FC goalkeeper Marco Carducci became the first CPL player called up to the Canada men's national soccer team. In the 2019 CPL final, Cavalry lost 2–0 to Forge FC of Hamilton, Ontario in a two-legged tie.

On November 9, 2024, Cavalry won its first ever Canadian Premier League championship by defeating four-time winners Forge FC 2–1 at ATCO Field. The team earned a 2025 CONCACAF Champions Cup berth in the process. In February 2025, Cavalry became the first Canadian Premier League team to win a match in CONCACAF Champions Cup, defeating Pumas UNAM 2–1 during the first leg of the first round matchup.

On November 21 2026, Cavalry won their second championship, beating Atlético Ottawa 3-2 in the final of the playoffs.

== Colours and crest ==
The team's crest was designed by Jon Rogers. The crest features a chevron in homage to the Lord Strathcona's Horse armoured regiment, Alberta Foothills and Rocky Mountains, and a football to represent the past and future of Calgary as a sporting city.

The club's colours are green, red and black (branded by the club as "army green," "Calgary red," and "black on black"). These colours symbolize the green of Calgary's nature and Spruce Meadows, and the red and black of other Calgary sports teams and the flag of Lord Strathcona's Horse. The official mascot is a red horse named Sarge.

=== Kit history ===
Home, away, and third kits.

- Home

2019	2020	2021	2022	2023	2024	2025	2026

- Away

2019	2020–21	2022	2023	2024	2025	2026

- Third

2024

=== Kit suppliers and sponsors ===
Period	Kit manufacturer	Chest sponsor	Sleeve sponsor
2019–2022	Macron	WestJet	None
2023–2024	Macron	WestJet	CIBC
2025	Macron	WestJet	None
2026	Hummel	WestJet	Moneris, Firefly Solar

== Stadium ==
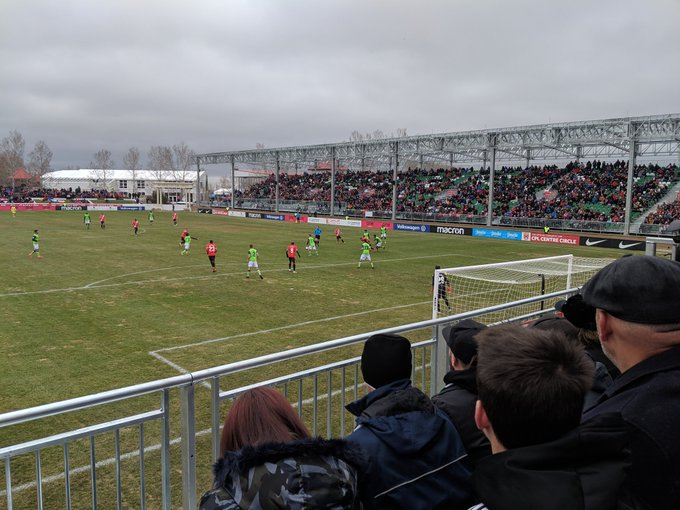
View of ATCO Field from section 203. The field is used by Cavalry FC for home games.

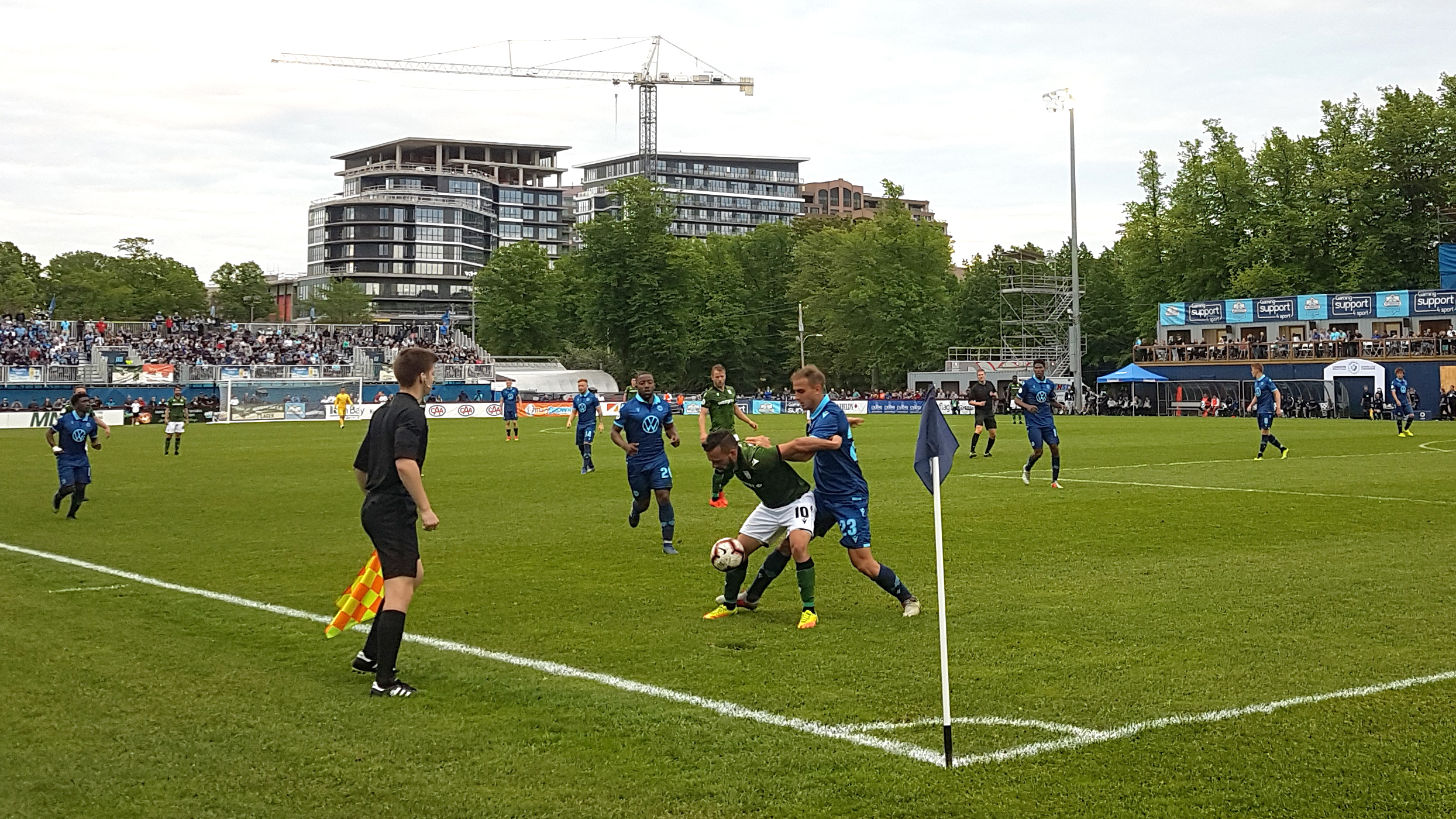
A game between Cavalry FC and HFX Wanderers FC during the CPL's inaugural season in 2019.

Cavalry FC play at ATCO Field, a 6,000-seat stadium located at Spruce Meadows, at the 'Meadows on the Green' equestrian ring. The stadium is modular to allow for future growth and uses natural grass. In September 2019, Spruce Meadows presented a new area plan to Foothills County, that includes a 12,000 seat soccer-specific stadium on the grounds that would replace ATCO Field over the next 30 years. The record attendance for a game at ATCO Field is 7,052, during the 2024 Canadian Premier League final.

Because ATCO Field is not suited to hosting matches in Canadian winter, Cavalry have played their February home games in the CONCACAF Champions Cup at Starlight Stadium, a 6,000-seat multi-purpose stadium in Langford, British Columbia and home to fellow CPL club Pacific FC.

== Club culture ==
=== Supporters ===
The Foot Soldiers are a supporters' group originally formed in 2015 to support USL League Two club Calgary Foothills and the Calgary Foothills UWS team. The group began supporting Cavalry in the lead-up to the first match, with the group's numbers swelling. Fans sitting in sections 108 and 109 have created a group called the Mighty 109 / 108 who sit on the other side of the entrance arch. The Frontline Ultras stand in section 201 and have supported the team since 2019.

=== Rivalries ===
Al Classico

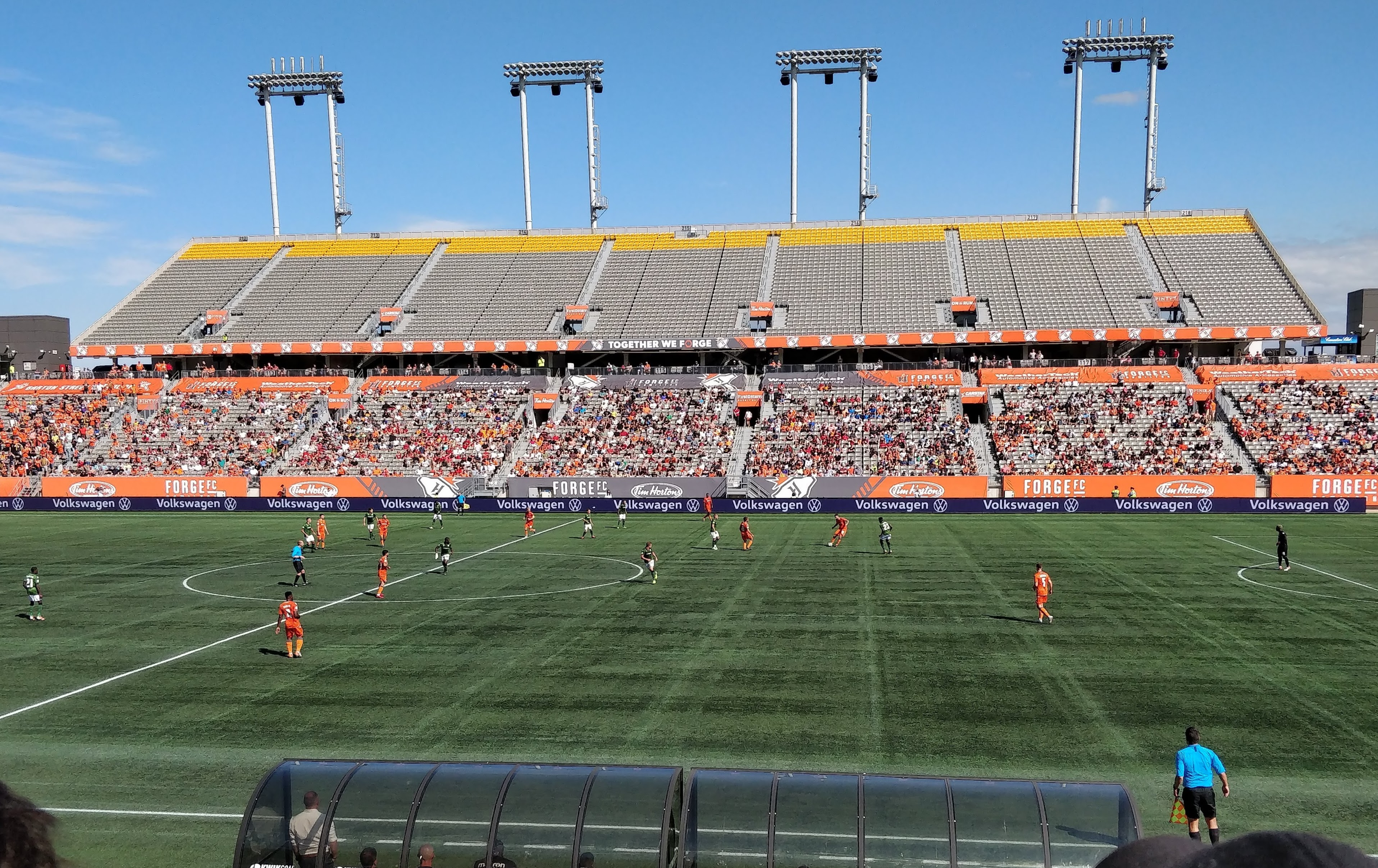
A game between Cavalry and Forge FC

The Al Classico existed with FC Edmonton as a geographical rivalry between the two Alberta-based clubs in the Canadian Premier League. The rivalry is part of a larger sporting rivalry between teams based in Calgary and Edmonton; the two largest cities in the province. The Wildrose Cup was awarded annually to the team that wins the most points from the series in league play (excluding 2020 due to the COVID-19 pandemic), which Cavalry won each year until FC Edmonton ceased operations in 2022.

Cavalry FC–Forge FC rivalry

The Cavalry FC–Forge FC rivalry developed during the 2019 spring season as the two top clubs in the league. The rivalry bled into the 2019 Canadian Championship in which Cavalry defeated Forge 3–2 over two legs on aggregate. The first leg, which resulted in a 1–1 draw, ended with heated altercations between both sides on the pitch, leading to a disciplinary review by the Canadian Soccer Association.

== Honours ==
Cavalry FC honours
Type	Competition	Titles	Seasons
Domestic	Canadian Premier League	2	2024, 2026
Domestic	CPL Shield	3	2019, 2023, 2026

== Players and staff ==
=== Roster ===
As of September 22, 2026

Note: Flags indicate national team as defined under FIFA eligibility rules; some limited exceptions apply. Players may hold more than one non-FIFA nationality.

No.	Pos.	Nation	Player
3	DF	USA	Curtis Ofori
4	DF	NED	Daan Klomp
5	DF	FRA	Bradley Kamdem
6	MF	PHI	Michael Baldisimo
7	FW	SOM	Ali Musse
8	MF	CAN	Harry Paton
9	FW	GER	Tobias Warschewski
10	MF	CAN	Sergio Camargo (captain)
11	FW	TUN	Hassan Ayari
14	FW	LCA	Caniggia Elva
15	DF	ENG	Levi Laing
16	DF	CAN	Adam Pearlman (on loan from Toronto FC)
17	MF	CAN	Nathaniel Edwards

No.	Pos.	Nation	Player
18	MF	CAN	Maël Henry
19	FW	CAN	Owen Antoniuk
20	FW	CAN	Goteh Ntignee
21	GK	CAN	Joseph Holliday
24	DF	CAN	Eryk Kobza
27	DF	CAN	Luc Ihama
28	MF	CAN	Niko Myroniuk
29	GK	CAN	Nathan Ingham
30	MF	CAN	James McGlinchey
32	DF	CAN	Kacper Plocinski
35	FW	CAN	Owen Graham-Roache (on loan from CF Montréal)
41	GK	CAN	Cristiano de Sousa
55	DF	CAN	Amer Didić
—	DF	CAN	Daniel Pribytov
—	MF	CAN	Micah Hyatt

=== Staff ===
As of May 8, 2026

Executive
Owner, chairman, and CEO	(Canada) Linda Southern-Heathcott
President and COO	(Canada) Ian Alisson
General manager	(England) Tommy Wheeldon Jr.
Assistant general manager	(Canada) Tofa Fakunle
Coaching staff
Head coach	(England) Tommy Wheeldon Jr.
Technical director and assistant coach	(England) Jonathan Wheeldon
Assistant coach	(Canada) Nik Ledgerwood
Goalkeeper coach	(England) Jack Hadley

=== Head coaches ===
As of November 10, 2024

Coach	Nation	Tenure	Record				
Coach	Nation	Tenure	G	W	D	L	Win %
Tommy Wheeldon Jr.	England	May 17, 2018 – present	178	91	44	43	51.12

=== Club captains ===
Years	Name	Nation
2019–2021	Nikolas Ledgerwood	Canada
2022	Mason Trafford	Canada
2023–2025	Marco Carducci	Canada
2026–present	Sergio Camargo	Canada

== Team record ==
=== Year-by-year ===
Season	League												Playoffs	CC	Continental		Average attendance	Top goalscorer(s)	
Season	Div	League	Pld	W	D	L	GF	GA	GD	Pts	PPG	Pos.	Playoffs	CC	Continental		Average attendance	Player(s)	Goals
2019	1	CPL	28	19	5	4	51	19	+32	62	2.21	1st	RU	SF	Ineligible		3,292	(Republic of the Congo) Dominique Malonga	13
2020	1	CPL	10	5	1	4	14	11	+3	16	1.60	–	DNQ	DNQ	DNQ		N/A	(England) Jordan Brown (England) Nathan Mavila	3
2021	1	CPL	28	14	8	6	34	30	+4	50	1.79	2nd	SF	QF	DNQ		2,544	(Republic of Ireland) Joe Mason	8
2022	1	CPL	28	14	5	9	39	33	+6	47	1.68	3rd	SF	QF	DNQ		3,492	(Republic of Ireland) Joe Mason	8
2023	1	CPL	28	16	7	5	46	27	+19	55	1.96	1st	RU	PR	DNQ		4,090	(New Zealand) Myer Bevan	11
2024	1	CPL	28	12	12	4	39	27	+12	48	1.71	2nd	W	QF	Champions Cup	R1	4,223	(Germany) Tobias Warschewski	15
2025	1	CPL	28	11	9	8	47	36	+11	42	1.50	3rd	RU	QF	Champions Cup	R1	TBD	(Germany) Tobias Warschewski	14

1. Average attendance include statistics from league matches only.
2. Top goalscorer(s) includes all goals scored in league season, league playoffs, Canadian Championship, CONCACAF League, and other competitive continental matches.

=== International competition ===
The following is a list of results for Cavalry FC in international competitions. Cavalry FC's scores are listed first.

Year	Tournament	Round	Opponent	Home	Away	Agg.
2024	CONCACAF Champions Cup	Round One	(United States) Orlando City SC	0–3	1–3	1–6
2025	CONCACAF Champions Cup	Round One	(Mexico) Pumas UNAM	2–1	0–2	2–3
2027	CONCACAF Champions Cup	Round One	TBD			

== Reserve team ==
Cavalry operates a reserve team, Cavalry FC II, in the semi-professional Alberta Premier League.
