= Cavalry FC II =

Canadian soccer team

- Full name: Cavalry Football Club II
- Founded: 2023
- Stadium: Shouldice Athletic Park
- Owner: Cavalry FC
- Head coach: Francesco Bartolillo
- League: Alberta Premier League
- 2025: L1AB, 7th
- Website: https://cavalryfc.canpl.ca/u21-team

Cavalry FC II is a Canadian soccer team based in Calgary, Alberta, Canada that plays in the Alberta Premier League. They are the academy and reserve club of Canadian Premier League club Cavalry FC. The team was originally known as Cavalry FC U21.

== History ==
In March 2019, Cavalry FC created a U20 side to participate in the amateur Alberta Major Soccer League, which was the top amateur league in the province of Alberta.

In May 2023, Cavalry FC announced the formation of a U21 side that would compete in the new semi-professional League1 Alberta that was launching that year. The club would also feature players from the first team squad playing via the Canadian Premier League's downward player movement project.

In September 2025, Cavalry FC announced that it would be rebranding the reserve side from Cavalry FC U21 to Cavalry FC II, along with the announcement of a new full-time academy for the club. It also announced the academy was fully funded and there would be no cost to the players.

== Players and Staff ==
=== Roster ===
As of September 3, 2025

Note: Flags indicate national team as defined under FIFA eligibility rules; some limited exceptions apply. Players may hold more than one non-FIFA nationality.

No.	Pos.	Nation	Player
—	GK	CAN	Cristiano De Sousa
—	GK	CAN	Blake Morrison
—	DF	CAN	Ben Zimola
—	DF	CAN	Max Gwynne
—	DF	CAN	Daniel Pribytov
—	DF	CAN	Robson Massey
—	DF	CAN	Xavier Chahal
—	MF	CAN	Thomas Stuber
—	MF	CAN	Beckham Loyer Beswick

No.	Pos.	Nation	Player
—	MF	CAN	Zario Reyes
—	MF	CAN	Micah Hyatt
—	MF	CAN	Ben Lam-Petryk
—	FW	CAN	Azariah Abebe
—	FW	CAN	Ethan Darpoh
—	FW	CAN	Luka Kaiser
—		CAN	Tomas Rojas
—		CAN	Kacper Plocinski
—		CAN	Jax Wheeldon

=== Staff ===
As of September 3, 2025

Coaching staff
Head Coach & Head of Youth Development	(Canada) Francesco Bartolillo

== Year-by-year ==
Season	League	Teams	Record	Rank	Playoffs	Top scorer		Ref
2023	League1 Alberta Exhibition Series	5	2–2–4	4th	did not qualify	(Canada) Kimia Kassanda	3	
2024	League1 Alberta	7	4–3–5	5th	did not qualify	(Canada) Chanan Chanda	7	
2025	League1 Alberta	9	5–3–8	7th	—	(Canada) Owen Antoniuk	7	

== Notable former players ==
The following players have either played at the professional or international level, either before or after playing for the academy or League1 Alberta team:

- (Canada) Owen Antoniuk
- (Canada) Michael Baldisimo
- (Canada) Chanan Chanda
- (Canada) Michael Harms
- (Canada) Joseph Holliday
- (Canada) Daniel Kaiser
- (Canada) Markus Kaiser
- (Canada) Victor Loturi
- (Canada) James McGlinchey
- (Canada) Callum Montgomery
- (Canada) Niko Myroniuk
- (Canada) Lukas Pareja
- (England) Aribim Pepple
- (Canada) Max Piepgrass
- (Canada) Skyler Rogers
- (Canada) Gareth Smith-Doyle
