= 2024 Vancouver FC season =

Vancouver FC
2024 season
- President: Rob Friend
- Head coach: Afshin Ghotbi
- Stadium: Willoughby Community Park Stadium
- Canadian Premier League: 7th
- CPL playoffs: Did not qualify
- Canadian Championship: Preliminary round
- Top goalscorer: League: Alejandro Díaz (10); All: Alejandro Díaz (10)
- Highest home attendance: 6,281 vs. Cavalry FC (June 16)
- Lowest home attendance: 2,151 vs. York United FC (July 20)
- Average home league attendance: 3,298
- Biggest win: 4–1 vs. Valour FC (Home, April 14, CPL)
- Biggest defeat: 0–4 vs. HFX Wanderers FC (Home, June 23, CPL)
Home colours	Away colours

The 2024 Vancouver FC season was the second season of Vancouver FC. In addition to the Canadian Premier League, the club also competed in the Canadian Championship.

== Squad ==
As of September 13, 2024

No.	Player	Nationality	Position(s)	Date of birth (age)	Previous club	Notes
Goalkeepers
1	Callum Irving	(Canada)	GK	March 16, 1993 (aged 31)	(Canada) Pacific FC	
28	Niko Giantsopoulos	(Canada)	GK	June 24, 1994 (aged 30)	(Canada) York United	
Defenders
2	Kadin Chung	(Canada)	RB	September 5, 1998 (aged 26)	(Canada) Toronto FC	
3	Rocco Romeo	(Canada)	CB	March 25, 2000 (aged 24)	(Canada) Valour FC	
4	Allan Enyou	(Uganda)	CB	December 24, 2003 (aged 21)	(Spain) Leganés B	INT, Loan
5	Matteo Campagna	(Canada)	CB / DM	June 4, 2004 (aged 20)	(Canada) Vancouver Whitecaps FC	U21
12	Tyler Crawford	(Canada)	LB	March 9, 2004 (aged 20)	(United States) Michigan State Spartans	U21
13	David Norman Jr.	(Canada)	LB / MF	May 31, 1998 (aged 26)	(Republic of Ireland) St Patrick's Athletic	
20	Anthony White	(Canada)	CB	August 1, 2003 (aged 21)	(Canada) Toronto Varsity Blues	U21
23	Paris Gee	(Canada)	LB / RB	July 5, 1994 (aged 30)	(Canada) York United	
24	Elage Bah	(Canada)	RB	July 30, 2004 (aged 20)	(Canada) Whitecaps FC 2	U21
25	James Cameron	(Canada)	RB	January 24, 2005 (aged 19)	(Canada) Unity FC	U21
40	Joey Buchanan	(Canada)	CB / DM	May 13, 2007 (aged 17)	(Canada) Burnaby FC	DEV
Midfielders
6	Vasco Fry	(Peru)	CM	July 30, 2000 (aged 24)	(Canada) Whitecaps FC 2	
7	Ben Fisk	(Canada)	RW / LW	February 4, 1993 (aged 31)	(Canada) Cavalry FC	
8	Renan Garcia	(Brazil)	CM	June 19, 1986 (aged 38)	(Brazil) Comercial	INT
10	Gabriel Bitar	(Lebanon)	AM / CF	August 23, 1998 (aged 26)	(Canada) FC Edmonton	
11	Mikaël Cantave	(Haiti)	AM / CF	October 25, 1996 (aged 28)	(Canada) Cavalry FC	
17	Zach Verhoven	(Canada)	LW / RW / RB	August 17, 1998 (aged 26)	(Canada) Atlético Ottawa	
26	Taryck Tahid	(Canada)	AM / CF	April 20, 2007 (aged 17)	(Canada) VanCity Pro FA	U21, EYT
27	Grady McDonnell	(Republic of Ireland)	CM	February 17, 2008 (aged 16)	(Canada) Whitecaps FC Academy	U21
29	Thomas Powell	(Canada)	AM	May 11, 2001 (aged 23)	(Canada) Unity FC	U21, U-S
	Olivier Rommens	(Belgium)	CM	February 3, 1995 (aged 29)	(Malta) Balzan F.C.	INT
Forwards
9	Alejandro Díaz	(Mexico)	FW	January 27, 1996 (aged 28)	(Norway) Sogndal	INT, Loan
18	Ayman Sellouf	(Netherlands)	LW / CF	August 25, 2001 (aged 23)	(Canada) Pacific FC	INT, Loan
19	José Navarro	(Mexico)	CF	February 20, 2003 (aged 21)	(Mexico) UNAM	INT
44	Sebastian Dzikowski	(Canada)	FW	August 23, 2001 (aged 23)	(Canada) UBC Thunderbirds	U21, U-S
	Austin Ricci	(Canada)	CF	April 8, 1996 (aged 28)	(Canada) York United	

== Transfers ==
=== In ===
No.	Pos.	Player	From club	Fee/notes	Date	Source
	MF	(Canada) Ben Fisk	(Canada) Cavalry FC	Transferred for a lower draft pick in the 2024 CPL–U Sports Draft	January 9, 2024	
13	MF	(Peru) Vasco Fry	(Canada) Whitecaps FC 2	Loan ended; signed on a permanent deal	January 11, 2024	
	DF	(Canada) David Norman Jr.	(Republic of Ireland) St Patrick's Athletic	Free	January 15, 2024	
	MF	(Republic of Ireland) Grady McDonnell	(Canada) Whitecaps FC Academy	Free	January 17, 2024	
	DF	(Canada) Paris Gee	(Canada) York United	Free	January 23, 2024	
	FW	(Mexico) José Navarro	(Mexico) UNAM	Free	February 16, 2024	
	DF	(Canada) Elage Bah	(Canada) Whitecaps FC 2	Free	February 20, 2024	
	MF	(Canada) Kembo Kibato	(United States) Hartford Athletic	Free	February 29, 2024	
	MF	(Canada) Zach Verhoven	(Canada) Atlético Ottawa	Free	March 14, 2024	
	FW	(New Zealand) Moses Dyer	(United States) FC Tulsa	Free	March 20, 2024	
	GK	(Canada) Niko Giantsopoulos	(Canada) York United	Free	April 5, 2024	
	MF	(Canada) Thomas Powell	(Canada) Unity FC	Selected 15th in the 2024 CPL–U Sports Draft, signed a U-Sports Contract	April 6, 2024	
	FW	(Canada) Sebastian Dzikowski	(Canada) UBC Thunderbirds	Signed a U-Sports Contract	April 6, 2024	
	DF	(Canada) Matteo Campagna	(Canada) Vancouver Whitecaps	Free	April 8, 2024	
	DF	(Canada) Joey Buchanan	(Canada) Burnaby FC	Signed to a development contract	April 10, 2024	
	MF	(Belgium) Olivier Rommens	(Malta) Balzan F.C.	Free	July 19, 2024	
	FW	(Canada) Austin Ricci	(Canada) York United	Free	September 13, 2024	

==== Loans in ====
No.	Pos.	Player	Loaned from	Fee/notes	Date	Source
	FW	(Mexico) Alejandro Díaz	(Norway) Sogndal	One year loan, extended through June 30, 2025	July 7, 2023	
	DF	(Uganda) Allan Enyou	(Spain) Leganés B	Season-long loan, extended through the 2025 season	May 7, 2024	
	FW	(Netherlands) Ayman Sellouf	(Canada) Pacific FC	Season-long loan	August 16, 2024	

==== Draft picks ====
Vancouver FC selected the following players in the 2024 CPL–U Sports Draft. Draft picks are not automatically signed to the team roster. Only those who are signed to a contract will be listed as transfers in.

Round	Selection	Pos.	Player	Nationality	University
1	2	MF	Luke Norman	Canada	UBC
2	15	MF	Thomas Powell	Canada	Trinity Western

=== Out ===
==== Transferred out ====
No.	Pos.	Player	To club	Fee/notes	Date	Source
21	GK	(United States) Jeremy Zielinski		Option declined	November 9, 2023	
14	MF	(Ghana) Nicky Gyimah		Option declined	November 9, 2023	
7	FW	(Canada) Nathaniel St. Louis	(Canada) Simcoe County Rovers	Option declined	November 9, 2023	
10	FW	(Canada) Shaan Hundal	(Canada) Valour FC	Option declined	November 9, 2023	
8	MF	(Iran) Nima Moazeni Zadeh		Contract expired	December 31, 2023	
17	MF	(South Korea) Min-jae Kwak	(United States) Chattanooga FC	Contract expired	December 31, 2023	
24	MF	(Canada) Lennon Thompson	(Scotland) Hearts B	Contract expired	December 31, 2023	
33	MF	(Colombia) Ivan Mejia	(Canada) TSS Rovers	Contract expired	December 31, 2023	
18	FW	(Iraq) Ameer Kinani		Contract expired	December 31, 2023	
4	DF	(England) Ibrahim Bakare	(England) Cheltenham Town	Contract terminated by mutual consent	February 15, 2024	
15	DF	(Canada) Mouhamadou Kane	(Canada) CS Saint-Laurent	Contract terminated by mutual consent	March 20, 2024	
16	MF	(England) Elliot Simmons	(England) Wealdstone	Contract terminated by mutual consent	May 28, 2024	
22	MF	(Canada) Kembo Kibato	(Canada) York United	Contract terminated by mutual consent	September 13, 2024	

==== Loans out ====
No.	Pos.	Player	Loaned to	Fee/notes	Date	Source
18	FW	(New Zealand) Moses Dyer	(Canada) Pacific FC	Season-long loan	August 16, 2024	

== Competitions ==
=== Overview ===
Competition	Starting round	Final position	Record							
Competition	Starting round	Final position	Pld	W	D	L	GF	GA	GD	Win %
Canadian Premier League	Matchday 1	Seventh	28	7	9	12	29	43	−14	25.00
Canadian Championship	First round	First Round	1	0	0	1	0	1	−1	0.00
Total			29	7	9	13	29	44	−15	24.14

Last updated: October 19, 2024
Source: Competitions

=== Canadian Premier League ===
==== Table ====
Pos	Team	Pld	W	D	L	GF	GA	GD	Pts	Playoff qualification
1	Forge (S)	28	15	5	8	45	31	+14	50	First semifinal
2	Cavalry (C)	28	12	12	4	39	27	+12	48	First semifinal
3	Atlético Ottawa	28	11	11	6	42	31	+11	44	Quarterfinal
4	York United	28	11	6	11	35	36	−1	39	Play-in round
5	Pacific	28	9	7	12	27	32	−5	34	Play-in round
6	HFX Wanderers	28	7	9	12	37	43	−6	30 (Note: Head-to-head points: HFX Wanderers 7, Vancouver 4)	
7	Vancouver	28	7	9	12	29	43	−14	30	
8	Valour	28	7	7	14	31	42	−11	28	

Source: CanPL
Rules for classification: 1) Points; 2) Total number of wins; 3) Head-to-head; 4) Goal differential; 5) Goals for; 6) Away goals differential; 7) Away goals for; 8) Home goals differential; 9) Home goals for; 10) Fewest disciplinary points; 11) Most under-21 domestic player minutes; 12) Drawing of lots.
(C) Champion (qualified to Champions Cup Round one); (S) CPL Shield winner (qualified to Champions Cup Round one)

==== Results by match ====
Match	1	2	3	4	5	6	7	8	9	10	11	12	13	14	15	16	17	18	19	20	21	22	23	24	25	26	27	28
Result	W	W	L	L	D	W	W	L	D	D	L	W	D	L	D	L	L	W	L	W	L	L	L	L	D	D	D	D
Position	1	1	4	5	4	4	2	2	3	4	5	2	3	4	5	5	5	5	5	5	5	5	6	6	6	5	6	7

Updated to match(es) played on October 19, 2024. Source: #Matches
W = Win; D = Draw; L = Loss

==== Matches ====
April 14 1	Vancouver FC	4–1	Valour FC	Langley Township, British Columbia
4:00pm PT	Dyer (yellow card) 31', (goal) 45'; Gee 47'; Fry (yellow card) 52'; Bitar 53'; Norman Jr. 67'; Cantave (yellow card) 79'	Report	Swibel 24'; Faria (yellow card) 48' (yellow-red card) 56'; Campbell (yellow card) 80'	Stadium: Willoughby Community Park; Attendance: 4,038; Referee: Alain Ruch

April 18 2	Vancouver FC	2–0	HFX Wanderers FC	Langley Township, British Columbia
7:00pm PT	Romeo (yellow card) 4', (goal) 17'; Díaz (yellow card) 44', (goal) 52'; Kibato (yellow card) 84'; Chung (yellow card) 87'	Report		Stadium: Willoughby Community Park; Attendance: 2,702; Referee: Sebastian Noshinravani

April 26 3	York United FC	3–0	Vancouver FC	Toronto, Ontario
7:00pm ET	Wright 70', 90+3'; Salanović 83', (yellow card) 87'; Ferrari (yellow card) 85'	Report	Fry (yellow card) 10'; Kibato (yellow card) 28'; Garcia (yellow card) 74'	Stadium: York Lions Stadium; Attendance: 843; Referee: Renzo Villanueva

May 3 4	Cavalry FC	3–1	Vancouver FC	Foothills County, Alberta
7:00pm MT	Warschewski 26', 60' (pen.); Trafford 38'; Kamdem (yellow card) 80'; Akio (yellow card) 80'	Report	Norman Jr. (yellow card) 8'; Campagna (yellow card) 59'; Powell (yellow card) 77'; Dyer 81', (yellow card) 88'	Stadium: ATCO Field; Attendance: 2,876; Referee: Myriam Marcotte

May 12 5	Vancouver FC	1–1	Atlético Ottawa	Langley Township, British Columbia
4:00pm PT	Cantave (yellow card) 46'; Díaz 68'; Bah (yellow card) 73'; Verhoven (yellow card) 80'; Dyer (yellow card) 83'; Fry (yellow card) 90+3'	Report	Aparicio (yellow card) 19'; Tabla (yellow card) 36'; del Campo 56'; de Brienne (yellow card) 76'; Sissoko (yellow card) 90+6'	Stadium: Willoughby Community Park; Attendance: 2,612; Referee: Robert D'Alesio

May 18 6	Forge FC	1–2	Vancouver FC	Hamilton, Ontario
4:00pm ET	Metusala (yellow card) 2'; Hojabrpour (yellow card) 41'; Bekker 53'; Borges (yellow card) 61'	Report	Romeo 3', (yellow card) 71'; Dyer (yellow card) 17'; Fry 29'; Garcia (yellow card) 57'; Bah (yellow card) 83'; Cameron (yellow card) 90+5'	Stadium: Tim Hortons Field; Attendance: 4,379; Referee: Mathieu Souaré

May 25 7	Vancouver FC	2–1	Pacific FC	Langley Township, British Columbia
3:00pm PT	Dyer 40', (yellow card) 65'; Fry (yellow card) 45', (goal) 85'; Giantsipoulos (yellow card) 62'; Garcia (yellow card) 81'; Navarro (yellow card) 90+2'	Report	Sellouf 6' (pen.); Bahous (yellow card) 26'; Dada-Luke (yellow card) 51'	Stadium: Willoughby Community Park; Attendance: 3,127; Referee: Ben Hoskins

June 2 8	Valour FC	2–0	Vancouver FC	Winnipeg, Manitoba
4:00pm CT	Swibel 38', 48'; Hundal (yellow card) 59'; Binate (yellow card) 89'; Sukunda (yellow card) 90+2'	Report	Fry (yellow card) 44'	Stadium: IG Field; Attendance: 4,262; Referee: Alain Ruch

June 9 9	York United FC	2–2	Vancouver FC	Toronto, Ontario
6:00pm ET	Voytsekhovskyy 18', (yellow card) 56'; Córdova 42', (yellow card) 90+2'; Abatneh (yellow card) 59'; Martínez (yellow card) 66'	Report	Díaz 21'; Gee (yellow card) 68'; Dyer 77' (pen.); Dzikowski (yellow card) 84'	Stadium: York Lions Stadium; Attendance: 1,167; Referee: Michael Venne

June 16 10 – CPL On Tour	Vancouver FC	0–0	Cavalry FC	Kelowna, British Columbia
2:00pm PT	Enyou (yellow card) 48'	Report		Stadium: Apple Bowl; Attendance: 6,281; Referee: Carly Shaw-MacLaren

June 23 11	Vancouver FC	0–4	HFX Wanderers FC	Langley Township, British Columbia
4:00pm PT	Gee (yellow card) 61'; Verhoven (yellow card) 74'	Report	Telfer 9', 18'; Fernandez (yellow card) 51'; Fillion (yellow card) 56'; Rampersad (red card) 68'; Nimick 77', 90' (pen.); Probo (yellow card) 81'	Stadium: Willoughby Community Park; Attendance: 3,060; Referee: Sebastian Noshinravani

June 27 12	Pacific FC	1–2	Vancouver FC	Langford, British Columbia
7:30pm PT	Meilleur-Giguère 38'; Young (yellow card) 90'	Report	Romeo (yellow card) 4'; Díaz 40'; Gee (yellow card) 76'; Bah 82'	Stadium: Starlight Stadium; Attendance: 3,255; Referee: Alain Ruch

July 5 13	Forge FC	3–3	Vancouver FC	Hamilton, Ontario
4:00pm PT	Owolabi-Belewu 36', (yellow card) 90+3'; Choinière (yellow card) 42', (goal) 85'; Parra (yellow card) 54', (goal) 66'; Poku (yellow card) 77'	Report	Bitar 12', (yellow card) 75', (goal) 90+1'; Díaz 40'; Fry (red card) 53'	Stadium: Tim Hortons Field; Attendance: 4,301; Referee: Yusri Rudolf

July 12 14	Vancouver FC	0–3	Atlético Ottawa	Langley Township, British Columbia
7:00pm PT	Norman Jr. (yellow card) 54'	Report	del Campo (yellow card) 12', (goal) 69'; Aparicio (yellow card) 26'; de Brienne (yellow card) 48'; Tabla 57'; Walker (yellow card) 85'; Salter 90+1'	Stadium: Willoughby Community Park; Attendance: 2,503; Referee: Scott Bowman

July 20 15	Vancouver FC	1–1	York United FC	Langley Township, British Columbia
3:00pm PT	Garcia (yellow card) 57'; Díaz 90+3'; Enyou (yellow card) 90+5'	Report	Williams (yellow card) 41'; Babouli 46'; Martínez (yellow card) 73'; Baldisimo (yellow card) 82'	Stadium: Willoughby Community Park; Attendance: 2,151; Referee: Michael Venne

July 26 16	Vancouver FC	0–1	Cavalry FC	Langley Township, British Columbia
7:00pm PT		Report	Henry 23'; Shome (yellow card) 61'	Stadium: Willoughby Community Park; Attendance: 3,286; Referee: Alain Ruch

August 5 17	HFX Wanderers FC	3–2	Vancouver FC	Halifax, Nova Scotia
12:00pm PT	Coimbra 20'; Rampersad 55'; Nimick 63' (pen.); Fernandez (yellow card) 69'	Report	Cantave 4', (yellow card) 44'; Garcia (yellow card) 29'; Romeo (yellow card) 36'; Gee (yellow card) 61'; Norman Jr. (yellow card) 90+5'; Díaz 90+7'	Stadium: Wanderers Grounds; Attendance: 6,500; Referee: Renzo Villanueva

August 11 18	Vancouver FC	1–0	Pacific FC	Langley Township, British Columbia
2:00pm PT	Rommens (yellow card) 51'; Díaz 62'; Fry (yellow card) 75'; Cameron (yellow card) 90+4'	Report	Heard (yellow card) 26'; Domínguez (yellow card) 43'; Quintana (yellow card) 57'	Stadium: Willoughby Community Park; Attendance: 3,258; Referee: Roberto D'Alesio

August 18 19	Vancouver FC	1–2	Forge FC	Langley Township, British Columbia
4:00pm PT	Enyou (yellow card) 50'; Bah 72'	Report	Choinière 6'; Parra (yellow card) 27'; Owolabi-Belewu (yellow card) 85'; Hojabrpour (yellow card) 87'; Schiavoni 89'	Stadium: Willoughby Community Park; Referee: Fabrizio Stasolla

August 25 20	Valour FC	1–2	Vancouver FC	Winnipeg, Manitoba
12:00pm PT	Campbell (yellow card) 45+2'; Swibel (yellow card) 64'; Hundal 87'	Report	Cameron (yellow card) 19' (red card) 69'; Bitar 30'; Sellouf 90+7'	Stadium: Princess Auto Stadium; Referee: Mario Alayass

August 31 21	Atlético Ottawa	1–0	Vancouver FC	Ottawa, Ontario
4:00pm PT	Iliadis 2'; de Brienne (yellow card) 45+3'	Report	Garcia (yellow card) 64'	Stadium: TD Place Stadium; Referee: Mathieu Souaré

September 6 22	Vancouver FC	0–1	York United FC	Langley Township, British Columbia
7:00pm PT	Chung (yellow card) 38'; Fry (yellow card) 71'; Rommens (yellow card) 79'	Report	Higgins 4', (yellow card) 30'; Botello (yellow card) 64'	Stadium: Willoughby Community Park; Attendance: 2,773; Referee: Marie-Soleil Beaudoin
Note: Vancouver FC manager Afshin Ghotbi was issued a yellow card (yellow card) in the 38th minute.

September 14 23	Pacific FC	3–0	Vancouver FC	Langford, British Columbia
2:00pm PT	Zanatta 7', 72'; Domínguez (yellow card) 14'; Dyer 43', (yellow card) 68'; Tîrcoveanu (yellow card) 44'	Report	Fry (yellow card) 18'; Irving (yellow card) 43'; Cantave (yellow card) 71'; Campagna (yellow card) 72'	Stadium: Starlight Stadium; Referee: Scott Bowman

September 21 24	Vancouver FC	1–3	Forge FC	Langley Township, British Columbia
3:00pm PT	Rommens (yellow card) 45+1'; McDonnell (yellow card) 47'; Tahid 88'	Report	Owolabi-Belewu (yellow card) 3'; Choinière 35'; Badibanga 53'; Jensen 83'; Metusala (yellow card) 90+4'	Stadium: Willoughby Community Park; Referee: Yusri Rudolf

September 28 25	Cavalry FC	0–0	Vancouver FC	Foothills County, Alberta
4:00pm PT	Musse (yellow card) 90+2'; Herdman (yellow card) 90+7'; Warschewski (yellow card) 90+8'	Report	Ricci (yellow card) 26'; Cameron (yellow card) 90'	Stadium: ATCO Field; Attendance: 4,493; Referee: Sebastian Noshinravani

October 5 26	HFX Wanderers FC	1–1	Vancouver FC	Halifax, Nova Scotia
11:00am PT	Probo (yellow card) 33'; Gagnon-Laparé (yellow card) 35'; Fernandez (red card) 80'; Rea (yellow card) 83'; Nimick (yellow card) 87'; Dias 90+8'	Report	Bah (yellow card) 29' (red card) 32'; Romeo (yellow card) 45+1'; Díaz 50' (pen.); Bitar (yellow card) 53'; Ricci (yellow card) 80'	Stadium: Wanderers Grounds; Referee: Michael Venne

October 13 27	Vancouver FC	1–1	Valour FC	Langley Township, British Columbia
2:00pm PT	Fry (yellow card) 52'; Díaz 76'; Cameron (yellow card) 79'; Enyou (yellow card) 83'; Tahid (yellow card) 90'	Report	Faria 54'; Kwemi (yellow card) 56'; Hundal (yellow card) 84'	Stadium: Willoughby Community Park; Referee: Mathieu Souaré

October 19 28	Atlético Ottawa	0–0	Vancouver FC	Ottawa, Ontario
1:00pm PT	Sissoko (yellow card) 18'; Aparicio (yellow card) 45+1'; de Brienne (yellow card) 69'; Bassett (yellow card) 83'; del Amo (yellow card) 85'; Iliadis (yellow card) 90+5'	Report	Cantave (yellow card) 25'	Stadium: TD Place Stadium; Referee: Renzo Villanueva

=== Canadian Championship ===
April 23 First round	Cavalry FC	1–0	Vancouver FC	Foothills County, Alberta
7:00pm MT	Shome (yellow card) 17' (red card) 61'; Dias (yellow card) 37'; Trafford (yellow card) 54'; Warschewski 66'	Report	Norman Jr. (yellow card) 41'	Stadium: ATCO Field; Attendance: 1,946; Referee: Pierre Luce Lauziere

== Statistics ==
=== Appearances and goals ===
As of October 19, 2024

No.	Pos	Nat	Player	Total		CPL		Canadian Championship	
No.	Pos	Nat	Player	Apps	Goals	Apps	Goals	Apps	Goals
Goalkeepers
1	GK	(Canada) CAN	Callum Irving	29	0	28	0	1	0
28	GK	(Canada) CAN	Niko Giantsopoulos	0	0	0	0	0	0
Defenders
2	DF	(Canada) CAN	Kadin Chung	20	0	17+2	0	1	0
3	DF	(Canada) CAN	Rocco Romeo	24	2	22+1	2	1	0
4	DF	(Uganda) UGA	Allan Enyou	23	0	22+1	0	0	0
5	DF	(Canada) CAN	Matteo Campagna	11	0	2+9	0	0	0
12	DF	(Canada) CAN	Tyler Crawford	8	0	1+7	0	0	0
13	DF	(Canada) CAN	David Norman Jr.	18	1	14+3	1	1	0
20	DF	(Canada) CAN	Anthony White	1	0	1	0	0	0
23	DF	(Canada) CAN	Paris Gee	25	1	23+1	1	1	0
24	DF	(Canada) CAN	Elage Bah	14	2	7+7	2	0	0
25	DF	(Canada) CAN	James Cameron	18	0	13+4	0	0+1	0
40	DF	(Canada) CAN	Joey Buchanan	0	0	0	0	0	0
Midfielders
6	MF	(Peru) PER	Vasco Fry	24	2	22+1	2	1	0
7	MF	(Canada) CAN	Ben Fisk	22	0	6+15	0	1	0
8	MF	(Brazil) BRA	Renan Garcia	28	0	26+1	0	1	0
10	MF	(Lebanon) LBN	Gabriel Bitar	27	4	20+6	4	1	0
11	MF	(Haiti) HAI	Mikaël Cantave	26	1	16+9	1	0+1	0
16	MF	(Belgium) BEL	Olivier Rommens	14	0	13+1	0	0	0
17	MF	(Canada) CAN	Zach Verhoven	4	0	0+4	0	0	0
26	MF	(Canada) CAN	Taryck Tahid	16	1	2+14	1	0	0
27	MF	(Republic of Ireland) IRL	Grady McDonnell	17	0	3+14	0	0	0
29	MF	(Canada) CAN	Thomas Powell	6	0	3+3	0	0	0
	MF	(Canada) CAN	Kembo Kibato	10	0	3+6	0	0+1	0
Forwards
9	FW	(Mexico) MEX	Alejandro Díaz	29	10	26+2	10	1	0
18	FW	(Netherlands) NED	Ayman Sellouf	10	1	4+6	1	0	0
19	FW	(Mexico) MEX	José Navarro	8	0	1+6	0	0+1	0
21	FW	(Canada) CAN	Austin Ricci	3	0	1+2	0	0	0
44	FW	(Canada) CAN	Sebastian Dzikowski	6	0	0+6	0	0	0
	FW	(New Zealand) NZL	Moses Dyer	14	4	12+1	4	1	0

Source: Competitions

=== Goalscorers ===
As of October 19, 2024

Rank	No.	Pos	Nat	Name	CPL	Canadian Championship	Total
1	9	FW	(Mexico)	Alejandro Díaz	10	0	10
2	10	MF	(Lebanon)	Gabriel Bitar	4	0	4
2		FW	(New Zealand)	Moses Dyer	4	0	4
4	3	DF	(Canada)	Rocco Romeo	2	0	2
4	6	MF	(Peru)	Vasco Fry	2	0	2
4	24	DF	(Canada)	Elage Bah	2	0	2
7	11	MF	(Haiti)	Mikaël Cantave	1	0	1
7	13	DF	(Canada)	David Norman Jr.	1	0	1
7	18	FW	(Netherlands)	Ayman Sellouf	1	0	1
7	23	DF	(Canada)	Paris Gee	1	0	1
7	26	MF	(Canada)	Taryck Tahid	1	0	1
Totals					29	0	29

=== Clean sheets ===
As of October 19, 2024

Rank	No.	Pos	Nat	Name	CPL	Canadian Championship	Total
1	1	GK	(Canada)	Callum Irving	5	0	5
Totals					5	0	5

=== Disciplinary record ===
As of October 19, 2024

No.	Pos	Nat	Player	CPL			Canadian Championship			Total		
No.	Pos	Nat	Player	Yellow card	(yellow card) (yellow-red card)	Red card	Yellow card	(yellow card) (yellow-red card)	Red card	Yellow card	(yellow card) (yellow-red card)	Red card
1	GK	(Canada)	Callum Irving	1	0	0	0	0	0	1	0	0
2	DF	(Canada)	Kadin Chung	2	0	0	0	0	0	2	0	0
3	DF	(Canada)	Rocco Romeo	5	0	0	0	0	0	5	0	0
4	DF	(Uganda)	Allan Enyou	4	0	0	0	0	0	4	0	0
5	DF	(Canada)	Matteo Campagna	2	0	0	0	0	0	2	0	0
6	MF	(Peru)	Vasco Fry	9	0	1	0	0	0	9	0	1
7	MF	(Canada)	Ben Fisk	0	0	0	0	0	0	0	0	0
8	MF	(Brazil)	Renan Garcia	6	0	0	0	0	0	6	0	0
9	FW	(Mexico)	Alejandro Díaz	1	0	0	0	0	0	1	0	0
10	MF	(Lebanon)	Gabriel Bitar	2	0	0	0	0	0	2	0	0
11	MF	(Haiti)	Mikaël Cantave	5	0	0	0	0	0	5	0	0
12	DF	(Canada)	Tyler Crawford	0	0	0	0	0	0	0	0	0
13	DF	(Canada)	David Norman Jr.	3	0	0	1	0	0	4	0	0
16	MF	(Belgium)	Olivier Rommens	3	0	0	0	0	0	3	0	0
17	MF	(Canada)	Zach Verhoven	2	0	0	0	0	0	2	0	0
18	FW	(Netherlands)	Ayman Sellouf	0	0	0	0	0	0	0	0	0
19	FW	(Mexico)	José Navarro	1	0	0	0	0	0	1	0	0
20	DF	(Canada)	Anthony White	0	0	0	0	0	0	0	0	0
21	FW	(Canada)	Austin Ricci	2	0	0	0	0	0	2	0	0
23	DF	(Canada)	Paris Gee	4	0	0	0	0	0	4	0	0
24	DF	(Canada)	Elage Bah	3	1	0	0	0	0	3	1	0
25	DF	(Canada)	James Cameron	5	1	0	0	0	0	5	1	0
26	MF	(Canada)	Taryck Tahid	1	0	0	0	0	0	1	0	0
27	MF	(Republic of Ireland)	Grady McDonnell	1	0	0	0	0	0	1	0	0
28	GK	(Canada)	Niko Giantsopoulos	1	0	0	0	0	0	1	0	0
29	MF	(Canada)	Thomas Powell	1	0	0	0	0	0	1	0	0
40	DF	(Canada)	Joey Buchanan	0	0	0	0	0	0	0	0	0
44	FW	(Canada)	Sebastian Dzikowski	1	0	0	0	0	0	1	0	0
	FW	(New Zealand)	Moses Dyer	5	0	0	0	0	0	5	0	0
	MF	(Canada)	Kembo Kibato	2	0	0	0	0	0	2	0	0
Totals				72	2	1	1	0	0	73	2	1

== Honours ==
=== Canadian Premier League Awards ===
The Canadian Premier League Awards were held in Calgary, Alberta, on November 7, 2024.

Name	Award	Status	Source
Callum Irving	Golden Glove	Nominated	

=== Monthly Awards ===
Month	Name	Award	Source
May	Callum Irving	Goalkeeper of the Month	

=== Team of the Week ===
The Gatorade Team of the Week is selected by the CPL's Kristian Jack and OneSoccer's Oliver Platt.

Week	Name	Source
1	Paris Gee; Gabriel Bitar; Alejandro Díaz	
2	Rocco Romeo; Renan Garcia; Moses Dyer	
5	Callum Irving; Kadin Chung	
6	Allan Enyou; Rocco Romeo (2); Vasco Fry	
7	Paris Gee (2); Vasco Fry (2); Moses Dyer (2)	
9	Moses Dyer (3)	
10	Kadin Chung (2)	
12	Callum Irving (2); Rocco Romeo (3)	
13	Gabriel Bitar (2)	
15	Grady McDonnell	
18	James Cameron; Alejandro Díaz (2)	
20	Gabriel Bitar (3); Ayman Sellouf	
25	Callum Irving (3); James Cameron (2)	
26	Callum Irving (4); David Norman Jr.	
28	Vasco Fry (3)	
