= 2024 Cavalry FC season =

Cavalry FC
2024 season
- Owner: Spruce Meadows Sports & Entertainment
- President: Ian Allison
- Head coach: Tommy Wheeldon Jr.
- Stadium: ATCO Field
- Canadian Premier League: 2nd
- CPL playoffs: Winners
- Canadian Championship: Quarter-finals
- CONCACAF Champions Cup: Round one
- Top goalscorer: League: Tobias Warschewski (12); All: Tobias Warschewski (15)
- Highest home attendance: 7,052 vs. Forge FC (November 9, CPL Final)
- Lowest home attendance: 1,946 vs. Vancouver FC (May 7, CC)
- Average home league attendance: 4,223
- Biggest win: 4–1 vs. Pacific FC (Away, October 5, CPL)
- Biggest defeat: 0–3 vs. Orlando City (Home (Note: Due to expected winter weather issues in Calgary, Cavalry FC played their first round match at Starlight Stadium in Langford, British Columbia.), February 21, CCC)
Home colours	Away colours	Third colours

The 2024 Cavalry FC season was the sixth season in the history of Cavalry FC. In addition to the Canadian Premier League, the club competed in the Canadian Championship and, for the first time ever, in the CONCACAF Champions Cup. The 2024 season also saw the club win the Canadian Premier League Finals for the first time in club history, beating rivals Forge FC in the deciding match.

== Squad ==
As of September 13, 2024

No.	Player	Nationality	Position(s)	Date of birth (age)	Previous club	Notes
Goalkeepers
1	Marco Carducci	(Canada)	GK	September 24, 1996 (aged 28)	(Canada) Calgary Foothills	
31	Joseph Holliday	(Canada)	GK	January 18, 2005 (aged 19)	(Canada) Cavalry FC U21	U21
35	Neven Fewster	(Canada)	GK	April 22, 2007 (aged 17)	(Canada) Cavalry FC U21	DEV
Defenders
3	Callum Montgomery	(Canada)	CB	May 14, 1997 (aged 27)	(United States) Minnesota United	
4	Daan Klomp	(Netherlands)	CB	August 10, 1998 (aged 26)	(Netherlands) NAC Breda	INT
5	Bradley Kamdem	(France)	LB / CB	August 18, 1994 (aged 30)	(Malta) Valletta	
12	Tom Field	(Republic of Ireland)	LB	March 14, 1997 (aged 27)	(Canada) Calgary Foothills	INT
25	Caden Rogozinski	(Canada)	CB	April 23, 2002 (aged 22)	(Canada) Mount Royal Cougars	U-S
29	Michael Harms	(Canada)	CB / RB	December 31, 2005 (aged 19)	(Canada) Calgary Foothills	U21
33	Fraser Aird	(Canada)	RB / RW / ST	February 2, 1995 (aged 29)	(Canada) FC Edmonton	
Midfielders
6	Charlie Trafford	(Canada)	DM	May 24, 1992 (aged 32)	(Wales) Wrexham	
8	Jesse Daley	(Australia)	CM	October 16, 1997 (aged 27)	(Australia) Brisbane Roar	INT
10	Sergio Camargo	(Canada)	AM	August 16, 1994 (aged 30)	(Canada) Calgary Foothills	
11	Jay Herdman	(New Zealand)	CM	August 14, 2004 (aged 20)	(Canada) Whitecaps FC 2	U21, Loan
15	Max Piepgrass	(Canada)	CM	April 7, 2004 (aged 20)	(Canada) Calgary Foothills	U21, U-S
17	Nicolas Wähling	(Germany)	RW / LW	August 24, 1997 (aged 27)	(Germany) TSV Steinbach	INT
18	Maël Henry	(Canada)	CM	May 26, 2004 (aged 20)	(Canada) Vancouver FC	U21, IL
24	Eryk Kobza	(Canada)	DM / CB	November 23, 2001 (aged 23)	(Canada) Calgary Dinos	
26	Shamit Shome	(Canada)	AM	September 5, 1997 (aged 27)	(Canada) FC Edmonton	
27	Diego Gutiérrez	(Canada)	RM / RB	February 18, 1997 (aged 27)	(Canada) Valour FC	
28	Niko Myroniuk	(Canada)	CM	July 21, 2005 (aged 19)	(Canada) Mount Royal Cougars	U21, U-S
25	Josh Belbin	(Canada)	CM	January 3, 2007 (aged 17)	(Canada) Cavalry FC U21	DEV
30	James McGlinchey	(Canada)	MID	May 18, 2007 (aged 17)	(Canada) Cavalry FC U21	DEV
Forwards
7	Ali Musse	(Somalia)	ST / AM	January 1, 1996 (aged 28)	(Germany) 1. FCA Darmstadt	
9	Malcolm Shaw	(Trinidad and Tobago)	CF / RW	July 27, 1995 (aged 29)	(Canada) Atlético Ottawa	
16	Tobias Warschewski	(Germany)	CF / RW	February 6, 1998 (aged 26)	(Canada) FC Edmonton	INT
19	William Akio	(South Sudan)	CF	July 23, 1998 (aged 26)	(Scotland) Ross County	IL
23	Chanan Chanda	(Canada)	CF	September 6, 2006 (aged 18)	(Canada) Cavalry FC U21	U21, EYT
80	Lowell Wright	(Canada)	CF	August 19, 2003 (aged 21)	(Canada) Whitecaps FC 2	U21
	Myer Bevan	(New Zealand)	ST	April 23, 1997 (aged 27)	(New Zealand) Auckland City	IL

=== Staff ===
As of May 21, 2024

Executive
Owner, chairman, and CEO	(Canada) Linda Southern-Heathcott
President and COO	(Canada) Ian Allison
General manager	(England) Tommy Wheeldon Jr.
Assistant general manager	(Canada) Tofa Fakunle
Coaching staff
Head coach	(England) Tommy Wheeldon Jr.
Technical director and assistant coach	(England) Jonathan Wheeldon
Assistant coach	(Canada) Nik Ledgerwood
Goalkeeper coach	(Canada) Jake Davis

== Transfers ==
=== In ===
No.	Pos.	Player	From club	Fee/notes	Date	Source
	FW	(Australia) Lleyton Brooks	(Australia) Melbourne Victory	Free	December 26, 2023	
	MF	(Canada) Diego Gutiérrez	(Canada) Valour FC	Free	January 2, 2024	
	FW	(Germany) Tobias Warschewski		Free	January 16, 2024	
	FW	(Trinidad and Tobago) Malcolm Shaw	(Canada) Atlético Ottawa	Free	April 4, 2024	
	MF	(Canada) Niko Myroniuk	(Canada) Mount Royal Cougars	U-Sports contract	April 10, 2024	
	MF	(Canada) Max Piepgrass	(Canada) CBU Capers	U-Sports contract	April 10, 2024	
	DF	(Canada) Caden Rogozinski	(Canada) Mount Royal Cougars	Selected 7th in the 2024 CPL–U Sports Draft, U-Sports contract	April 10, 2024	
	FW	(Canada) Chanan Chanda	(Canada) Cavalry FC U21	Signed to an Exceptional Young Talent contract	June 21, 2024	
	GK	(Canada) Joseph Holliday	(Canada) Cavalry FC U21	Free	June 29, 2024	
	MF	(Germany) Nicolas Wähling	(Germany) TSV Steinbach	Free	July 5, 2024	
	FW	(Canada) Lowell Wright	(Canada) Whitecaps FC 2	Free	July 25, 2024	
	GK	(Canada) Neven Fewster	(Canada) Cavalry FC U21	Signed to a development contract	September 3, 2024	
	MF	(Canada) Josh Belbin	(Canada) Cavalry FC U21	Signed to a development contract	September 3, 2024	
	MF	(Canada) James McGlinchey	(Canada) Cavalry FC U21	Signed to a development contract	September 3, 2024	

==== Loans in ====
No.	Pos.	Player	Loaned from	Fee/notes	Date	Source
	MF	(Canada) Lucas Dias	(Portugal) Sporting CP B	Loaned until June 30, 2024	February 5, 2024	
	GK	(England) Jack Barrett	(England) Everton F.C. Reserves	Loaned until June 30, 2024	February 9, 2024	
	MF	(New Zealand) Jay Herdman	(Canada) Whitecaps FC 2	Loaned until end of season	September 13, 2024	

==== Draft picks ====
Cavalry FC selected the following players in the 2024 CPL–U Sports Draft. Draft picks are not automatically signed to the team roster. Only those who are signed to a contract will be listed as transfers in.

Round	Selection	Pos.	Player	Nationality	University
1	7	DF	Caden Rogozinski	Canada	Mount Royal
2	10	MF	Rodane Cato	Canada	Alberta

=== Out ===
==== Transferred out ====
No.	Pos.	Player	To club	Fee/notes	Date	Source
2	DF	(Spain) Roberto Alarcón	(Canada) Valour FC	Option declined	November 30, 2023	
23	FW	(Canada) Gareth Smith-Doyle		Option declined	November 30, 2023	
15	DF	(Nigeria) Udoka Chima	(England) Worthing F.C.	Contract terminated by mutual consent	November 30, 2023	
21	GK	(Canada) Sterling Kerr		Contract expired	December 31, 2023	
20	FW	(Republic of Ireland) Joe Mason		Contract expired	December 31, 2023	
17	MF	(Canada) Ben Fisk	(Canada) Vancouver FC	Transferred for a higher draft pick in the 2024 CPL–U Sports Draft	January 9, 2024	
14	FW	(England) Ethan Beckford	(England) Havant & Waterlooville	Undisclosed	January 30, 2024	
11	FW	(Australia) Lleyton Brooks		Contract terminated by mutual consent	July 25, 2024	

==== Loans out ====
No.	Pos.	Player	Loaned to	Fee/notes	Date	Source
11	MF	(Honduras) José Escalante	(Honduras) F.C. Motagua	One-year loan	July 10, 2023	
30	FW	(Benin) Goteh Ntignee	(France) FC Annecy	One-year loan, with option to buy for undisclosed fee	August 31, 2023	

== Competitions ==
=== Overview ===
Competition	First match	Last match	Starting round	Final position	Record							
Competition	First match	Last match	Starting round	Final position	Pld	W	D	L	GF	GA	GD	Win %
Canadian Premier League	April 13	October 19	Matchday 1	2nd	28	12	12	4	24	27	−3	42.86
Canadian Premier League playoffs	October 27	November 9	First semi-finals	Winners	3	2	0	1	3	1	+2	66.67
Canadian Championship	April 23	May 21	Preliminary round	Quarter-finals	4	2	0	2	3	2	+1	50.00
CONCACAF Champions Cup	February 21	February 27	Round one	Round one	1	0	0	1	1	6	−5	0.00
Total					36	16	12	8	31	36	−5	44.44

Source: Competitions

=== Canadian Premier League ===
==== Table ====
Pos	Team	Pld	W	D	L	GF	GA	GD	Pts	Playoff qualification
1	Forge (S)	28	15	5	8	45	31	+14	50	First semifinal
2	Cavalry (C)	28	12	12	4	39	27	+12	48	First semifinal
3	Atlético Ottawa	28	11	11	6	42	31	+11	44	Quarterfinal
4	York United	28	11	6	11	35	36	−1	39	Play-in round
5	Pacific	28	9	7	12	27	32	−5	34	Play-in round
6	HFX Wanderers	28	7	9	12	37	43	−6	30 (Note: Head-to-head points: HFX Wanderers 7, Vancouver 4)	
7	Vancouver	28	7	9	12	29	43	−14	30	
8	Valour	28	7	7	14	31	42	−11	28	

Source: CanPL
Rules for classification: 1) Points; 2) Total number of wins; 3) Head-to-head; 4) Goal differential; 5) Goals for; 6) Away goals differential; 7) Away goals for; 8) Home goals differential; 9) Home goals for; 10) Fewest disciplinary points; 11) Most under-21 domestic player minutes; 12) Drawing of lots.
(C) Champion (qualified to Champions Cup Round one); (S) CPL Shield winner (qualified to Champions Cup Round one)

==== Matches ====
The Canadian Premier League announced each team's home openers on January 18. The full regular season schedule was released on January 23. The season kicked off on Saturday, April 13.

April 13 1	Forge FC	2–1	Cavalry FC	Hamilton, Ontario
14:00 (UTC-04:00)	Badibanga (yellow card) 44', (goal) 76'; Parra (yellow card) 51'; Borges 70'; Owolabi-Belewu (yellow card) 83'	Report	Klomp (yellow card) 55'; Camargo 60'	Stadium: Tim Hortons Field; Attendance: 7,395; Referee: Scott Bowman

April 20 2	Atlético Ottawa	1–1	Cavalry FC	Ottawa, Ontario
	Zapater (yellow card) 4'; Twardek (yellow card) 37'; Didić 47', (yellow card) 81'; Del Campo (yellow card) 85'	Report	Twardek 37' (own)	Stadium: TD Place Stadium; Attendance: 4,569; Referee: Mathieu Souaré

April 28 3	Cavalry FC	0–0	Pacific FC	Foothills County, Alberta
		Report	Heard (yellow card) 63'; Toussaint (yellow card) 85'	Stadium: ATCO Field; Attendance: 4,183; Referee: Yusri Rudolf

May 3 4	Cavalry FC	3–1	Vancouver FC	Foothills County, Alberta
	Warschewski 26', 60' (pen.); Trafford 38'; Kamdem (yellow card) 80'; Akio (yellow card) 80'	Report	Norman (yellow card) 8'; Campagna (yellow card) 59'; Powell (yellow card) 77'; Dyer 81', (yellow card) 88'	Stadium: ATCO Field; Attendance: 2,876; Referee: Myriam Marcotte

May 11 5	HFX Wanderers FC	1–1	Calvary FC	Halifax, Nova Scotia
	Coimbra (yellow card) 28'; Gagnon-Laparé (yellow card) 33'; Nimick (yellow card) 33'; Fernandez (yellow card) 42'; Telfer (yellow card) 45'; Probo 78'	Report	Trafford (yellow card) 34'; Akio 58'; Daley (yellow card) 69'; Kamdem (yellow card) 89'	Stadium: Wanderers Grounds; Attendance: 5544; Referee: Carly Shaw-MacLaren

May 18 6	Cavalry FC	2–2	York United FC	Foothills County, Alberta
	Warschewski 24' (pen.); Dias (yellow card) 45'; Shaw 72'; Myroniuk (yellow card) 77'	Report	Ferrari (yellow card) 23'; Ricci (yellow card) 40', (goal) 62'; Wright 68'; Botello (yellow card) 79'; Vincensini (yellow card) 79'; Martínez (yellow card) 81'	Stadium: ATCO Field; Attendance: 3551; Referee: Renzo Villanueva

May 26 7	Cavalry FC	1–1	Valour FC	Foothills County, Alberta
	Trafford (yellow card) 11'; Aird 39'	Report	Sánchez 31'; Abdul Binate (yellow card) 34'; Ohin (yellow card) 79'; Faria (yellow card) 88'	Stadium: ATCO Field; Attendance: 3395; Referee: Michael Venne

June 1 8	Pacific FC	1–1	Calvary FC	Langford, British Columbia
	Yeates 6'; Lamothe (yellow card) 45+1'; Young (yellow card) 71'	Report	Warschewski 67'	Stadium: Starlight Stadium; Attendance: 3264; Referee: Scott Bowman

June 8 9	Cavalry FC	1–0	Forge FC	Foothills County, Alberta
	Brooks (yellow card) 41'; Warschewski (yellow card) 45', (goal) 59'; Gutiérrez (yellow card) 45+1'; Shome (yellow card) 83'	Report	Badibanga (yellow card) 8'; Owolabi-Belewu (yellow card) 57'; Achinioti-Jönsson (yellow card) 79'; Kane (red card) 89'	Stadium: ATCO Field; Attendance: 4691; Referee: Marie-Soleil Beaudoin

June 16 10 CPL On Tour	Vancouver FC	0–0	Calvary FC	Kelowna, British Columbia
	Enyou (yellow card) 48'	Report		Stadium: Apple Bowl; Attendance: 6281; Referee: Carly Shaw-MacLaren

June 21 11	Cavalry FC	1–1	Atlético Ottawa	Foothills County, Alberta
	Warschewski 2'; Gutiérrez (yellow card) 64'; Daley (yellow card) 90'	Report	Zapater 39'; Torres (yellow card) 90+4'	Stadium: ATCO Field; Attendance: 4235; Referee: Ben Hoskins

July 1 12	HFX Wanderers FC	1–0	Cavalry FC	Halifax, Nova Scotia
	Callegari (yellow card) 19'; Telfer 49'; Gagnon-Laparé (yellow card) 77'	Report	Kobza (yellow card) 17'; Trafford (yellow card) 37'; Field (yellow card) 69'	Stadium: Wanderers Grounds; Attendance: 6200; Referee: Marie-Soleil Beaudoin

July 7 13	Valour FC	0–1	Cavalry FC	Winnipeg, Manitoba
	Campbell (yellow card) 36'; Alarcón (red card) 80'	Report	Aird 34', (yellow card) 77'; Gutiérrez (yellow card) 41'; Daley (yellow card) 81'	Stadium: Princess Auto Stadium; Attendance: 3770; Referee: Michael Venne

July 13 14	Cavalry FC	1–2	York United FC	Foothills County, Alberta
	Aird (yellow card) 35'; Klomp (yellow card) 52'; Montgomery (yellow card) 61'; Warschewski 90+8'	Report	Wright (yellow card) 18'; Abatneh (yellow card) 24'; León (yellow card) 35'; Babouli 63'; Sturing (yellow card) 78'; Jimoh 82'; Higgins (yellow card) 83'; Botello (yellow card) 90+2'	Stadium: ATCO Field; Attendance: 4234; Referee: Roberto D'Alesio

July 21 15	Cavalry FC	1–1	Forge FC	Foothills County, Alberta
	Klomp (yellow card) 23', (goal) 57'	Report	Parra (yellow card) 24' (yellow-red card) 82'; Field 58' (own)	Stadium: ATCO Field; Attendance: 4569; Referee: Mathieu Souaré

July 26 16	Vancouver FC	0–1	Cavalry FC	Langley, British Columbia
		Report	Henry 23'; Shome (yellow card) 61'	Stadium: Willoughby Community Park at the Langley Events Centre; Attendance: 3286; Referee: Alain Ruch

August 3 17	Atlético Ottawa	1–2	Cavalry FC	Ottawa, Ontario
	Salter 87'	Report	Camargo (yellow card) 33'; Musse 72', 89'; Shome (yellow card) 76'; Aird (yellow card) 89'	Stadium: TD Place Stadium; Attendance: 5711; Referee: Ben Hoskins

August 10 18	Cavalry FC	3–2	HFX Wanderers FC	Foothills County, Alberta
	Klomp 10', 66'; Loughrey 21' (own); Musse (yellow card) 59'	Report	Coimbra 12'; Fillion (yellow card) 60'; Nimick 70' (pen.); Alphone (yellow card) 90'	Stadium: ATCO Field; Attendance: 4,695; Referee: Mario Al Ayass

August 16 19	York United FC	1–2	Cavalry FC	Toronto, Ontario
	Babouli (yellow card) 4'; Martínez 43'; León (yellow card) 51' (yellow-red card) 90+4'; Córdova (yellow card) 65'	Report	Klomp (yellow card) 27'; Henry 35', (yellow card) 67'; Aird 52'; Carducci (yellow card) 76'; Daley (yellow card) 90+5'	Stadium: York Lions Stadium; Attendance: 1,594; Referee: Ben Hoskins

August 24 20	Cavalry FC	1–0	Pacific FC	Foothills County, Alberta
	Klomp 90+1', (yellow card) 90+1'	Report	Quintana (yellow card) 57'; Gazdov (yellow card) 85'	Stadium: ATCO Field; Attendance: 5,043; Referee: Carly Shaw-MacLaren

August 30 21	Cavalry FC	2–2	Valour FC	Foothills County, Alberta
	Kamdem 56', (yellow card) 71'; Viscosi 61' (own)	Report	Mourdoukoutas (yellow card) 11'; Ohin 66', (yellow card) 90+5'; Binate 70'; Facchineri (yellow card) 90+1'	Stadium: ATCO Field; Attendance: 4,055; Referee: Scott Bowman

September 7 22	Forge FC	2–1	Cavalry FC	Hamilton, Ontario
	Borges 7', 57' (pen.), (yellow card) 62'; Owolabi-Belewu (yellow card) 45+1'; Bekker (yellow card) 90+5'	Report	Kamdem (yellow card) 56'; Gutiérrez (yellow card) 56'; Klomp 64'; Field (yellow card) 75'	Stadium: Tim Hortons Field; Attendance: 4,671; Referee: Michael Venne

September 15 23	Cavalry FC	2–2	Atlético Ottawa	Foothills County, Alberta
	Klomp (yellow card) 8', (goal) 66'; Musse 16'; Kamdem (yellow card) 55'; Gutiérrez (yellow card) 74'	Report	Aparicio 5'; Del Campo 48'; Didić (yellow card) 55'; Iliadis (yellow card) 65'	Stadium: ATCO Field; Attendance: 4,567; Referee: Myriam Marcotte

September 20 24	York United FC	0–2	Cavalry FC	Toronto, Ontario
	León (yellow card) 45+1'; Ferrari (yellow card) 45+2'; Botello (yellow card) 53'; Córdova (yellow card) 73'; Adekugbe (yellow card) 77'; Guzmán (yellow card) 90+10' (yellow-red card) 90+10'	Report	Musse 20'; Field (yellow card) 57'; Warschewski (yellow card) 59'; Camargo 62'; Chanda (yellow card) 86'; Kamdem (yellow card) 90+1'	Stadium: York Lions Stadium; Attendance: 1,732; Referee: Scott Bowman

September 28 25	Cavalry FC	0–0	Vancouver FC	Foothills County, Alberta
	Musse (yellow card) 90+2'; Herdman (yellow card) 90+7'; Warschewski (yellow card) 90+8'	Report	Ricci (yellow card) 26'; Cameron (yellow card) 90'	Stadium: ATCO Field; Attendance: 4,493; Referee: Sebastian Noshinravani

October 5 26	Pacific FC	1–4	Cavalry FC	Langford, British Columbia
	Gazdov (red card) 3'; Meilleur-Giguère (yellow card) 31'; Zanatta 38' (pen.); Domínguez (yellow card) 49'; Ceceri (yellow card) 81' (yellow-red card) 84'	Report	Herdman 35', (yellow card) 63'; Warschewski 61', 75'; Wright 77'	Stadium: Starlight Stadium; Attendance: 3,187; Referee: Mathieu Souaré

October 12 27	Cavalry FC	2–1	HFX Wanderers FC	Foothills County, Alberta
	Aird (yellow card) 37'; Shome (yellow card) 45'; Warschewski 48'; Montgomery 79'	Report	Probo 53'; Gagnon-Laparé (yellow card) 58'; Mekidèche (yellow card) 77'	Stadium: ATCO Field; Attendance: 4,533; Referee: Renzo Villanueva

October 19 28	Valour FC	1–2	Cavalry FC	Winnipeg, Manitoba
	Binate 7'; Alarcón (yellow card) 14'; Campbell (yellow card) 22'; Mlah (yellow card) 33'; Swibel (yellow card) 75'; Ohin (yellow card) 90'	Report	Warschewski 56', 89' (pen.)	Stadium: Princess Auto Stadium; Attendance: 2,244; Referee: Yusri Rudolf

==== Playoff matches ====
Cavalry qualified for the CPL playoffs on September 28.

After winning the first semifinal against Forge FC, Cavalry hosted the Final on November 9 against the winner of the second semi-final in a Page playoff system. Forge won the second semifinal against Atlético Ottawa, meaning Cavalry would play only Forge in the 2024 playoffs.

October 27 First semifinal	Forge FC	0–1	Cavalry FC	Hamilton, Ontario
4:00 pm	Owolabi-Belewu (yellow card) 90+5'	Report	Warschewski 27'	Stadium: Tim Hortons Field; Attendance: 6,521; Referee: Yusri Rudolf

November 9 Final	Cavalry FC	2–1	Forge FC	Foothills County, Alberta
3:00 pm	Warschewski 32' (pen.); Camargo 38'; Gutiérrez (yellow card) 51'; Shaw (yellow card) 74'; Klomp (yellow card) 90+4'	Report	Achinioti-Jönsson (yellow card) 15', (goal) 52'; Badibanga (yellow card) 47'; Borges (yellow card) 88'	Stadium: ATCO Field; Attendance: 7,052; Referee: Renzo Villanueva

=== Canadian Championship ===
The Canadian Championship campaign kicked off on Tuesday, April 23, 2024.

Preliminary round

April 23	Cavalry FC	1–0	Vancouver FC	Foothills County, Alberta
19:00 (UTC-06:00)	Shome (yellow card) 17', (red card) 61'; Diaz (yellow card) 37'; Trafford (yellow card) 54'; Warschewski 66'	Report	Norman (yellow card) 41'	Stadium: ATCO Field; Attendance: 1,946; Referee: Pierre-Luc Lauzière

Quarter-finals

May 7 First leg	Cavalry FC	1–2	Vancouver Whitecaps FC	Foothills County, Alberta
	Trafford (yellow card) 27'; Montgomery (yellow card) 52'; Klomp (yellow card) 62'; Shaw 90+3'	Report	Johnson 45+2', 80', (yellow card) 75'	Stadium: ATCO Field; Attendance: 4,084; Referee: Ben Hoskins

May 21 Second leg	Vancouver Whitecaps FC	0–1 (2 (a) –2 agg.)	Cavalry FC	Vancouver, British Columbia
	Vite (yellow card) 22'; Ahmed (yellow card) 45'	Report	Daley (yellow card) 7'; Veselinovic 32' (o.g.); Brooks (yellow card) 44'; Klomp (yellow card) 59'; Camargo (yellow card) 60'	Stadium: BC Place; Attendance: 11,863; Referee: Mathieu Souaré

=== CONCACAF Champions Cup ===
The CONCACAF Champions Cup draw was held on December 13, 2023. Having qualified as CPL Shield winners, Cavalry FC entered the competition in round one and began play in February 2024. Because of potential weather issues in Calgary in February, the club announced shortly after the draw that their first round match would be played at Pacific FC's Starlight Stadium in Langford, BC.

==== Round one ====
February 21 First leg	Cavalry FC (Canada)	0–3	(United States) Orlando City SC	Langford, British Columbia
22:00 (19:00 UTC−08:00)	Trafford (yellow card) 55'; Montgomery (yellow card) 60'	Report	McGuire 21'; Torres 38', 75'	Stadium: Starlight Stadium; Attendance: 2,484; Referee: Juan Gabriel Calderón (Costa Rica)

February 27 Second leg	Orlando City SC (United States)	3–1 (6–1 agg.)	(Canada) Cavalry FC	Orlando, Florida
18:00	Lodeiro 48'; Enrique 71'; Smith 88'	Report	Klomp (yellow card) 57'; Bevan 64'	Stadium: Inter&Co Stadium; Attendance: 5,141; Referee: Fernando Guerrero (Mexico)

== Statistics ==
As of November 9, 2024

=== Squad and statistics ===
No.	Pos	Nat	Player	Total		CPL		CPL Playoffs		Canadian Championship		Champions Cup	
No.	Pos	Nat	Player	Apps	Goals	Apps	Goals	Apps	Goals	Apps	Goals	Apps	Goals
1	GK	(Canada) CAN	Marco Carducci	34	0	27	0	2	0	3	0	2	0
31	GK	(Canada) CAN	Joseph Holliday	0	0	0	0	0	0	0	0	0	0
31	GK	(Canada) CAN	Mitchell Barrett	0	0	0	0	0	0	0	0	0	0
35	GK	(Canada) CAN	Neven Fewster	0	0	0	0	0	0	0	0	0	0
4	DF	(Netherlands) NED	Daan Klomp	34	6	27	6	2	0	3	0	2	0
12	DF	(Republic of Ireland) IRL	Tom Field	22	0	21	0	0	0	1	0	0	0
3	DF	(Canada) CAN	Callum Montgomery	27	1	21	1	2	0	2	0	2	0
5	DF	(France) FRA	Bradley Kamdem	26	1	19	1	2	0	3	0	2	0
24	DF	(Canada) CAN	Eryk Kobza	25	0	18	0	2	0	3	0	2	0
29	DF	(Canada) CAN	Michael Harms	2	0	2	0	0	0	0	0	0	0
26	MF	(Canada) CAN	Shamit Shome	33	0	28	0	2	0	1	0	2	0
33	DF	(Canada) CAN	Fraser Aird	33	3	26	3	2	0	3	0	2	0
10	MF	(Canada) CAN	Sergio Camargo	31	3	24	2	2	1	3	0	2	0
11	FW	(New Zealand) NZL	Jay Herdman	8	1	6	1	2	0	0	0	0	0
27	MF	(Canada) CAN	Diego Gutiérrez	34	0	27	0	2	0	3	0	2	0
8	MF	(Australia) AUS	Jesse Daley	20	0	17	0	0	0	2	0	1	0
28	MF	(Canada) CAN	Niko Myroniuk	11	0	11	0	0	0	0	0	0	0
6	MF	(Canada) CAN	Charlie Trafford	27	1	20	1	2	0	3	0	2	0
22	MF	(Canada) CAN	James McGlinchey	0	0	0	0	0	0	0	0	0	0
25	MF	(Canada) CAN	Josh Belbin	0	0	0	0	0	0	0	0	0	0
9	FW	(Germany) GER	Tobias Warschewski	31	15	24	12	2	2	3	1	2	0
7	FW	(Somalia) SOM	Ali Musse	22	4	16	4	2	0	2	0	2	0
17	FW	(Germany) GER	Nicolas Wähling	14	0	13	0	1	0	0	0	0	0
14	FW	(Trinidad and Tobago) TTO	Malcolm Shaw	26	2	21	1	2	0	3	1	0	0
80	FW	(Canada) CAN	Lowell Wright	12	1	11	1	1	0	0	0	0	0
18	MF	(Canada) CAN	Maël Henry	10	2	9	2	0	0	0	0	1	0
23	FW	(Canada) CAN	Chanan Chanda	7	0	7	0	0	0	0	0	0	0
23	FW	(South Sudan) SSD	William Akio	13	1	8	1	0	0	3	0	2	0
Player(s) transferred out during this season
9	FW	(New Zealand) NZL	Myer Bevan	2	1	0	0	0	0	0	0	2	1
23	FW	(Australia) AUS	Lleyton Brooks	17	0	13	0	0	0	3	0	1	0
22	MF	(Canada) CAN	Max Piepgrass	0	0	0	0	0	0	0	0	0	0
25	DF	(Canada) CAN	Caden Rogozinski	0	0	0	0	0	0	0	0	0	0
21	GK	(England) ENG	Jack Barrett	1	0	1	0	0	0	0	0	0	0
20	FW	(Canada) CAN	Lucas Dias	15	0	11	0	0	0	3	0	1	0

=== Goal scorers ===
Rank	Nat.	Player	Pos.	CPL	CPL Playoffs	Canadian Championship	Champions Cup	TOTAL
1	(Germany)	Tobias Warschewski	FW	12	2	1	0	15
2	(Netherlands)	Daan Klomp	DF	6	0	0	0	6
3	(Somalia)	Ali Musse	FW	4	0	0	0	4
4	(Canada)	Sergio Camargo	MF	2	1	0	0	3
4	(Canada)	Fraser Aird	DF	3	0	0	0	3
6	(Trinidad and Tobago)	Malcolm Shaw	FW	1	0	1	0	2
6	(Canada)	Maël Henry	MF	2	0	0	0	2
8	(Canada)	Charlie Trafford	MF	1	0	0	0	1
8	(Canada)	Callum Montgomery	DF	1	0	0	0	1
8	(France)	Bradley Kamdem	DF	1	0	0	0	1
8	(New Zealand)	Jay Herdman	FW	1	0	0	0	1
8	(New Zealand)	Myer Bevan	FW	0	0	0	1	1
8	(Canada)	Lowell Wright	FW	1	0	0	0	1
8	(South Sudan)	William Akio	FW	1	0	0	0	1
Own goals				1	0	1	0	2
Totals				37	3	3	1	44

=== Clean sheets ===
Rank	Nat.	Player	CPL	CPL Playoffs	Canadian Championship	Champions Cup	TOTAL
1	(Canada)	Marco Carducci	8	1	2	0	11
2	(England)	Jack Barrett	0	0	0	0	0
2	(Canada)	Mitchell Barrett	0	0	0	0	0
2	(Canada)	Joseph Holliday	0	0	0	0	0
2	(Canada)	Neven Fewster	0	0	0	0	0
Totals			8	1	2	0	11

=== Disciplinary record ===
No.	Pos.	Nat.	Player	CPL		CPL Playoffs		Canadian Championship		Champions Cup		TOTAL	
No.	Pos.	Nat.	Player	Yellow card	Red card	Yellow card	Red card	Yellow card	Red card	Yellow card	Red card	Yellow card	Red card
1	GK	(Canada)	Marco Carducci	1	0	0	0	0	0	0	0	1	0
4	DF	(Netherlands)	Daan Klomp	7	0	1	0	2	0	1	0	11	0
12	DF	(Republic of Ireland)	Tom Field	3	0	0	0	0	0	0	0	3	0
3	DF	(Canada)	Callum Montgomery	1	0	0	0	1	0	1	0	3	0
5	DF	(France)	Bradley Kamdem	6	0	0	0	0	0	0	0	6	0
26	MF	(Canada)	Shamit Shome	4	0	0	0	1	1	0	0	5	1
33	DF	(Canada)	Fraser Aird	4	0	0	0	0	0	0	0	4	0
10	MF	(Canada)	Sergio Camargo	1	0	0	0	1	0	0	0	2	0
11	FW	(New Zealand)	Jay Herdman	2	0	0	0	0	0	0	0	2	0
27	MF	(Canada)	Diego Gutiérrez	5	0	1	0	0	0	0	0	6	0
8	MF	(Australia)	Jesse Daley	4	0	0	0	1	0	0	0	5	0
28	MF	(Canada)	Niko Myroniuk	1	0	0	0	0	0	0	0	1	0
6	MF	(Canada)	Charlie Trafford	3	0	0	0	1	0	1	0	5	0
20	FW	(Canada)	Lucas Dias	4	0	0	0	1	0	0	0	2	0
9	FW	(Germany)	Tobias Warschewski	3	0	0	0	0	0	0	0	3	0
7	FW	(Somalia)	Ali Musse	2	0	0	0	0	0	0	0	2	0
18	MF	(Canada)	Maël Henry	1	0	0	0	0	0	0	0	1	0
23	FW	(Canada)	Chanan Chanda	1	0	0	0	0	0	0	0	1	0
11	FW	(Australia)	Lleyton Brooks	1	0	0	0	1	0	0	0	2	0
14	FW	(Trinidad and Tobago)	Malcolm Shaw	0	0	1	0	0	0	0	0	1	0
Totals				54	0	3	0	9	1	3	0	68	1

== Honours ==
=== Canadian Premier League Awards ===
The 2024 Canadian Premier League Awards took place on November 7 in Calgary.

Nat.	Name	Award	Status
(Germany)	Tobias Warschewski	Golden Boot	Won
(Germany)	Tobias Warschewski	CPL Final MVP	Won
(Germany)	Tobias Warschewski	Player of the Year	Nominated
(Netherlands)	Daan Klomp	Defender of the Year	Won
(England)	Tommy Wheeldon Jr.	Coach of the Year	Nominated

==== Best XI ====
The 2024 Canadian Premier League Best XI was announced on November 21, and were selected by the league's football department.

Pos.	Nat.	Name
DF	(Canada)	Fraser Aird
DF	(Netherlands)	Daan Klomp
FW	(Somalia)	Ali Musse
FW	(Germany)	Tobias Warschewski

==== Monthly awards ====
Month	Nat.	Name	Award	Source
July	(Canada)	Marco Carducci	Goalkeeper of the Month	
August	(England)	Tommy Wheeldon Jr.	Manager of the Month	
August	(Netherlands)	Daan Klomp	Player of the Month	
October	(England)	Tommy Wheeldon Jr. (2)	Manager of the Month	
October	(Germany)	Tobias Warschewski	Player of the Month	

==== Player of the week ====
Week	Nat.	Name	Source
4	(Germany)	Tobias Warschewski	
6	(Canada)	Fraser Aird	
17	(Somalia)	Ali Musse	
19	(Canada)	Maël Henry	
20	(Netherlands)	Daan Klomp	
28	(Germany)	Tobias Warschewski (2)	

==== Team of the week ====
The Team of the Week is usually selected by the CPL's Kristian Jack and OneSoccer's Oliver Platt.

Week		Name	Source
4	(France)	Bradley Kamdem	
4	(Canada)	Fraser Aird	
4	(Canada)	Charlie Trafford	
4	(Germany)	Tobias Warschewski	
5	(Canada)	Lucas Dias	
6	(Canada)	Fraser Aird (2)	
6	(Trinidad and Tobago)	Malcolm Shaw	
7	(Canada)	Fraser Aird (3)	
9	(Canada)	Marco Carducci	
9	(Netherlands)	Daan Klomp	
9	(Canada)	Fraser Aird (4)	
9	(Germany)	Tobias Warschewski (2)	
10	(Netherlands)	Daan Klomp (2)	
11	(Republic of Ireland)	Tom Field	
13	(Canada)	Eryk Kobza	
13	(Canada)	Fraser Aird (5)	
13	(Germany)	Tobias Warschewski (3)	
15	(Netherlands)	Daan Klomp (3)	
15	(Canada)	Sergio Camargo	
16	(Republic of Ireland)	Tom Field (2)	
16	(Canada)	Diego Gutiérrez	
16	(Canada)	Maël Henry	
17	(Netherlands)	Daan Klomp (4)	
17	(Somalia)	Ali Musse	
17	(Canada)	Diego Gutiérrez (2)	
18	(Netherlands)	Daan Klomp (5)	
18	(Canada)	Fraser Aird (6)	
18	(Somalia)	Ali Musse (2)	
19	(Netherlands)	Daan Klomp (6)	
19	(Canada)	Fraser Aird (7)	
19	(Canada)	Maël Henry (2)	
20	(France)	Bradley Kamdem (2)	
20	(Netherlands)	Daan Klomp (7)	
20	(Canada)	Diego Gutiérrez (3)	
21	(Canada)	Diego Gutiérrez (4)	
23	(Netherlands)	Daan Klomp (8)	
23	(Somalia)	Ali Musse (3)	
24	(Canada)	Sergio Camargo (2)	
24	(Germany)	Tobias Warschewski (4)	
26	(Republic of Ireland)	Tom Field (3)	
26	(New Zealand)	Jay Herdman	
26	(Germany)	Tobias Warschewski (5)	
27	(Canada)	Callum Montgomery	
27	(Germany)	Tobias Warschewski (6)	
27	(Somalia)	Ali Musse (4)	
28	(Netherlands)	Daan Klomp (9)	
28	(Germany)	Tobias Warschewski (7)	
28	(Somalia)	Ali Musse (5)	
