= Chanan Chanda =

Canadian soccer player

Personal information
- Date of birth: September 6, 2006 (age 20)
- Height: 5 ft 10 in (1.78 m)
- Position: Forward

Youth career
- MSB United SC
- Calgary West FC
- Calgary Blizzard SC
- 2023–2024: Cavalry FC

College career
Years	Team	Apps	(Gls)
2025–	Mount Royal Cougars	19	(14)

Senior career*
Years	Team	Apps	(Gls)
2024–2025	Cavalry FC U21	16	(8)
2024–2025	Cavalry FC	9	(0)
2026–	Calgary Foothills FC	8	(7)
- * Club domestic league appearances and goals as of June 26, 2026

Chanan Chanda (born September 6, 2006) is a Canadian soccer player who plays for Calgary Foothills FC in the Alberta Premier League.

== Early life ==
Chanda played youth soccer with MSB United, Calgary West FC, and Calgary Blizzard SC. In 2023, he began playing with Cavalry FC U21 and attended training camp with the first team in 2024.

== University career ==
In 2025, Chanda began attending Mount Royal University, where he played for the men's soccer team. On August 24, 2025, he scored his first goals, netting a brace in a 3-1 victory over the MacEwan Griffins. At the end of his rookie season, he was named to a Canada West Second Team All-Star and named to the Canada West All-Rookie Team. He was also named the U Sports Rookie of the Year and named to the U Sports All-Rookie Team.

== Club career ==
Chanda began the 2024 season with Cavalry FC U21 in League1 Alberta. In June 2024, he signed an Exceptional Young Talent contract with Cavalry FC of the Canadian Premier League through the 2026 season, with a club option for 2027. At the time of his first team signing, he had been the leading scorer in League1 Alberta with seven goals. He made his CPL debut on June 21, 2024 against Atlético Ottawa. In September 2025, it was announced that Chanda would have his contract terminated by mutual consent, as he would choose to play for Mount Royal University for the 2025 U Sports season.

== Career statistics ==
As of match played June 26, 2026

Club	Season	League			Playoffs		Domestic Cup		Continental		Total	
Club	Season	Division	Apps	Goals	Apps	Goals	Apps	Goals	Apps	Goals	Apps	Goals
Cavalry FC U21	2024	League1 Alberta	8	7	—		—		—		8	7
Cavalry FC U21	2025	League1 Alberta	8	1	—		—		—		8	1
Cavalry FC U21	Total		16	8	0	0	0	0	0	0	16	8
Cavalry FC	2024	Canadian Premier League	7	0	0	0	0	0	0	0	7	0
Cavalry FC	2025	Canadian Premier League	2	0	0	0	1	0	0	0	3	0
Cavalry FC	Total		9	0	0	0	1	0	0	0	10	0
Calgary Foothills	2026	Alberta Premier League	8	7	0	0	0	0	0	0	8	7
Career total			33	15	0	0	1	0	0	0	34	15
