= Grady McDonnell =

Irish footballer (born 2008)

Personal information
- Full name: Grady Francis McDonnell
- Date of birth: February 17, 2008 (age 18)
- Place of birth: Surrey, British Columbia, Canada
- Height: 1.85 m (6 ft 1 in)
- Position: Midfielder

Team information
- Current team: Nottingham Forest
- Number: 49

Youth career
- Coastal FC
- Supra Academy
- 2022–2023: Vancouver Whitecaps FC
- 2026–: Nottingham Forest

Senior career*
| Years | Team | Apps | (Gls) |
| 2024–2025 | Vancouver FC | 17 | (0) |
| 2025–2026 | Club NXT | 5 | (0) |
| 2026– | Nottingham Forest | 0 | (0) |

International career^{‡}
| 2022–2023 | Republic of Ireland U15 | 11 | (0) |
| 2023 | Canada U15 | 4 | (2) |
| 2023 | Republic of Ireland U16 | 2 | (1) |
| 2023–2025 | Republic of Ireland U17 | 17 | (2) |
| 2026– | Republic of Ireland U19 | 3 | (0) |
| 2026– | Republic of Ireland U21 | 1 | (0) |
- * Club domestic league appearances and goals as of 17:43, 23 June 2026 (UTC) ‡ National team caps and goals as of 20:30, 6 October 2026 (UTC)

Grady Francis McDonnell (born February 17, 2008) is a professional footballer who plays as a midfielder for the academy of Premier League club Nottingham Forest. Born in Canada, he is a youth international for Ireland.

== Early life ==
Born in Surrey, British Columbia, McDonnell began playing youth soccer with Coastal FC at the age of five. Afterwards, he played with the Supra Academy, until the age of 13. He spent some time with the Whitecaps FC Pre-Academy, before officially joining the Vancouver Whitecaps Academy in August 2022. He then had training stints with Blackburn Rovers in England, Schalke 04 in Germany, and Shamrock Rovers in Ireland.

== Club career ==
=== Vancouver FC ===
On January 17, 2024, McDonnell signed a professional contract with Vancouver FC of the Canadian Premier League through the 2026 season. He became the youngest player in the league's history to ever sign a professional deal, at 15 years and 11 months. He made his professional debut for the club on May 3, aged 16, in a 3–1 league loss to Cavalry FC; in the process, he became the second-youngest player to ever debut in Vancouver's history (behind only T.J. Tahid), and the third-youngest in the league's history. In July 2024, he was named to the CPL Team of the Week for the first time, being included in the Best XI for week 15.

=== Club Brugge ===
On January 31, 2025, McDonnell moved to Club NXT, the second team of Belgian club Club Brugge, for an undisclosed fee of $350,000, plus add-ons, making it the second-largest fee in Canadian Premier League history.

=== Nottingham Forest ===
On 23 June 2026, he signed a three-year-contract with Premier League club Nottingham Forest.

== International career ==
McDonnell is eligible to represent Canada, where he was born, and Ireland, where his grandfather was from.

In September 2022, McDonnell was invited to join a training camp with the Ireland U15 national team for the first time; the following month, he was subsequently called up to the squad for the UEFA Development Tournament. While with the Ireland U15, he served as the team captain.

In August 2023, he was called up to the Canada U15 national team for the 2023 CONCACAF Boys' Under-15 Championship. He scored two goals in a group stage victory over the Dominican Republic.

In October 2023, he was called up to the Republic of Ireland U17 national team for three 2024 UEFA European Under-17 Championship qualification matches. In November of the same year, he played with the Republic of Ireland U16 team, helping them win the Victory Shield, a friendly tournament involving the U16 teams of Scotland, Republic of Ireland, Northern Ireland and Wales. On 5 September 2024, McDonnell scored his first goal for the Republic of Ireland U17s in a 2–1 loss to Denmark. McDonnell was named in the squad for the 2025 FIFA U-17 World Cup in Qatar in November 2025.

In September 2026, McDonnell received his first call up to the Republic of Ireland U21 side. On 6 October 2026, he made his debut for the side, in a 3–1 win over England U21 at Turners Cross.
