= José Navarro (footballer, born 2003) =

Mexican footballer

Personal information
- Full name: José Navarro Hernández
- Date of birth: 20 February 2003 (age 23)
- Place of birth: Mexico City, Mexico
- Height: 1.85 m (6 ft 1 in)
- Position: Forward

Youth career
- 2018–2024: UNAM

Senior career*
Years	Team	Apps	(Gls)
2022–2024	UNAM	1	(0)
2024–2025	Vancouver FC	11	(0)
2025	→ Langley United (loan)	1	(0)
- * Club domestic league appearances and goals as of 22 October 2025

José Navarro Hernández (born 20 February 2003) is a Mexican professional footballer who plays as a forward.

== Early life ==
He began playing youth football at Pumitas, a subsidiary school of UNAM, later being promoted to the official UNAM youth system at U14 level in 2018.

== Club career ==
On 3 July 2022, he made his senior debut for UNAM, coming on as a substitute in the 90th minute against Club Tijuana, also picking up a yellow card in stoppage time. In February 2024, he announced his departure from the club, citing limited opportunities for youth players to rise up the ranks.

In February 2024, he signed a two-year contract with Canadian Premier League club Vancouver FC. He made his debut on 14 April against Valour FC.

== Career statistics ==
As of 22 October 2025

Club	Season	League			Cup		Continental		Other		Total	
Club	Season	Division	Apps	Goals	Apps	Goals	Apps	Goals	Apps	Goals	Apps	Goals
UNAM	2022–23	Liga MX	1	0	—		—		—		1	0
Vancouver FC	2024	Canadian Premier League	7	0	1	0	—		—		8	0
Vancouver FC	2025	Canadian Premier League	4	0	—		—		—		4	0
Vancouver FC	Total		11	0	1	0	—		—		12	0
Langley United (loan)	2025	League1 British Columbia	1	0	—		—		—		1	0
Career total			13	0	1	0	0	0	0	0	14	0
