= Thomas Powell (Canadian soccer) =

Canadian soccer player (born 2001)

Personal information
- Date of birth: May 11, 2001 (age 25)
- Place of birth: Coquitlam, British Columbia, Canada
- Height: 5 ft 7 in (1.70 m)
- Position: Midfielder

Team information
- Current team: Vancouver FC
- Number: 18

Youth career
- Coquitlam Metro-Ford SC

College career
Years	Team	Apps	(Gls)
2021–	Trinity Western Spartans	60	(11)

Senior career*
Years	Team	Apps	(Gls)
2022–2023	Unity FC	11+	(2+)
2024–	Vancouver FC	28	(0)
2025–	→ Langley United (loan)	4	(0)
- * Club domestic league appearances and goals as of October 7, 2026

Thomas Powell (born May 11, 2001) is a Canadian soccer player who plays for Vancouver FC in the Canadian Premier League.

== Early life ==
Powell played youth soccer with Coquitlam Metro-Ford SC.

== University career ==
In 2021, Powell began attending Trinity Western University, where he played for the men's soccer team. He made his debut on September 10, 2021 against the UBC Okanagan Heat. He scored his first goal on September 25, 2021, in a 1-1 draw with the UFV Cascades. He was thrice named the TWU Male Athlete of the Week (in September 2022, September 2023, and September 2024). In 2023, he was named to the All-Canada West First Team. In 2024, he was named to the All-Canada West Second Team.

== Club career ==
In 2022 and 2023, Powell played with Unity FC in League1 British Columbia.

At the 2024 CPL-U Sports Draft, Powell was selected in the second round (15th overall) by Vancouver FC. In April 2024, he signed a U Sports contract with the club. He made his debut on May 3 against Cavalry FC. In August 2024, he departed the club per the terms of his U Sports contract to return to university, with the club retaining his rights for the 2025 season. In March 2025, he signed another U Sports contract with the club for the 2025 season. In August 2025, he extended his U Sports contract for the remainder of the season, rather than to return to university. In January 2026, he signed a fully professional contract for 2026, with options for 2027 and 2028.

== Personal life ==
Powell is a practicing Roman Catholic.

== Career statistics ==
As of October 7, 2026

Club	Season	League			Playoffs		Domestic Cup		Continental		Total	
Club	Season	Division	Apps	Goals	Apps	Goals	Apps	Goals	Apps	Goals	Apps	Goals
Unity FC	2023	League1 British Columbia	11	2	0	0	–		–		11	2
Vancouver FC	2024	Canadian Premier League	6	0	–		0	0	–		6	0
Vancouver FC	2025	Canadian Premier League	18	0	–		2	0	–		20	0
Vancouver FC	2026	Canadian Premier League	4	0	0	0	0	0	1	0	5	0
Vancouver FC	Total		28	0	0	0	2	0	1	0	31	0
Langley United (loan)	2025	League1 British Columbia	3	0	–		–		–		3	0
Langley United (loan)	2026	British Columbia Premier League	1	0	–		–		–		1	0
Langley United (loan)	Total		4	0	0	0	0	0	0	0	4	0
Career total			43	2	0	0	2	0	1	0	46	2
