= T.J. Tahid =

Canadian soccer player

T. J. Tahid
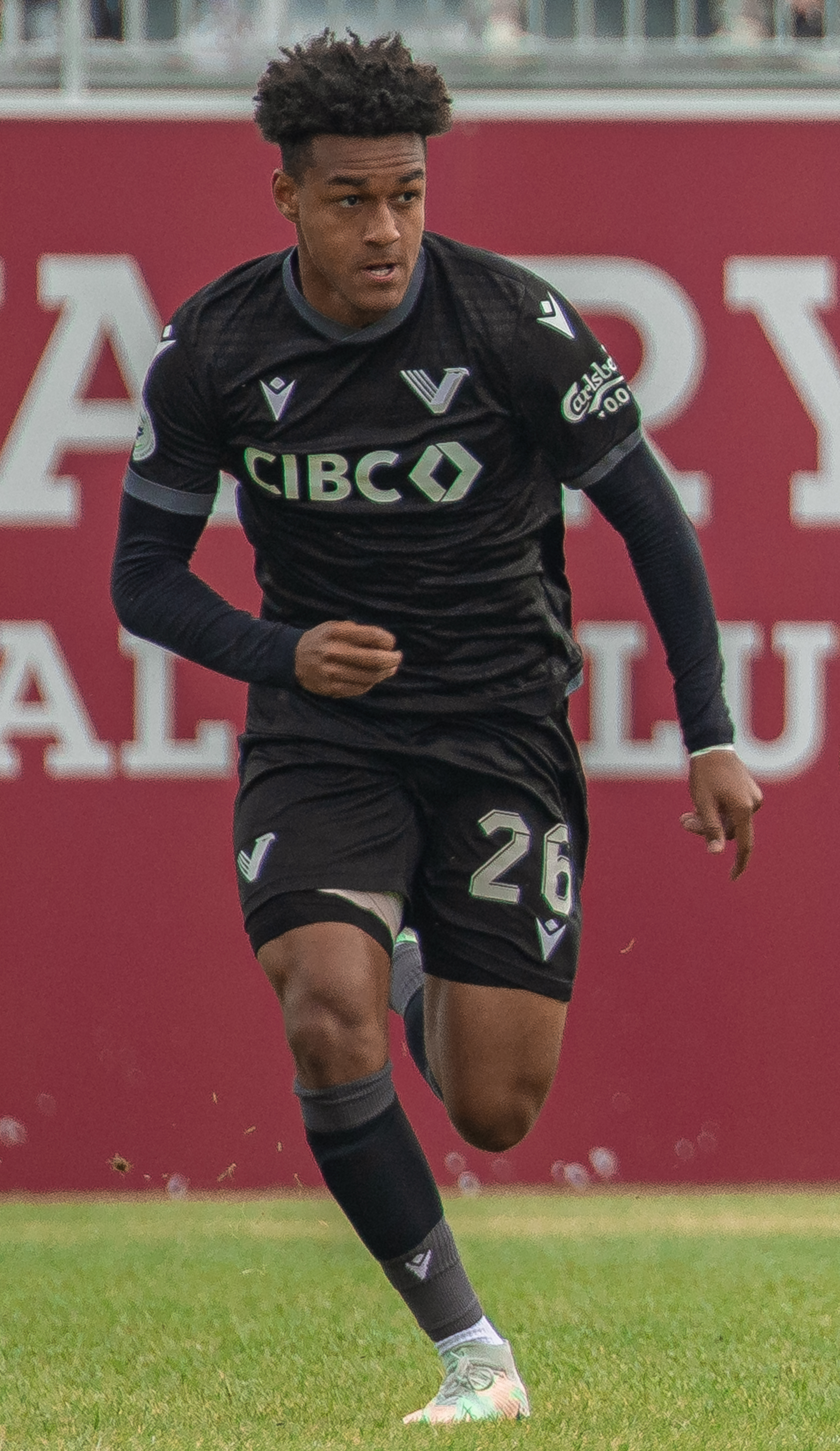
- Tahid with Vancouver FC in 2023

Personal information
- Full name: Taryck Jordan Tahid
- Date of birth: April 21, 2007 (age 19)
- Place of birth: New Westminster, British Columbia, Canada
- Height: 5 ft 10 in (1.78 m)
- Position: Midfielder

Youth career
- New Westminster Africa United FC
- –2017: Albion FC
- 2018–2022: VanCity Pro Football Academy
- 2025–2026: Skënderbeu Korçë

Senior career*
Years	Team	Apps	(Gls)
2023–2025	Vancouver FC	46	(4)
2025–2026	Skënderbeu Korçë	0	(0)
2026–	FK Be1	0	(0)

International career^{‡}
2023	Canada U17	6	(1)
2025	Ghana U20	1	(0)
2025	Canada U18	2	(0)
- * Club domestic league appearances and goals as of October 26, 2026 ‡ National team caps and goals as of September 7, 2025

Taryck Jordan Tahid (born April 21, 2007) is a Canadian professional soccer player who plays as a midfielder for Lithuanian club FK Be1 in the I Lyga.

Tahid is the youngest player to have ever played in a Canadian Premier League match, as well as the youngest goalscorer in league history.

== Early life ==
Tahid was born in New Westminster, British Columbia and was raised in a Ghanaian-Canadian family in Maple Ridge, British Columbia. He began playing youth soccer at age three with New Westminster Africa United FC, later joining Albion FC, in his hometown of Maple Ridge, British Columbia. In 2018, he joined the VanCity Pro Football Academy, which was founded by his father. He has also trialed with the academies of Spanish club Villarreal, Danish club FC Midtjylland and American club New York Red Bulls. He also trained with men's amateur teams from the Vancouver Metro Soccer League. In 2019, during a trip to Ghana with his family, he trained with local club Yelzoli FC.

In his youth, he also ran track and field, setting the 100m and 200m records for Grade 5 boys at the Maple Ridge-Pitt Meadows school district elementary track and field championships in 2018. He attended Maple Ridge Secondary School, switching to online classes to be able to combine his professional career.

== Club career ==
After trialing with the club during pre-season, on May 6, 2023, Tahid signed a full professional contract with Vancouver FC of the Canadian Premier League, becoming (at the time) the youngest player to ever sign a Canadian Premier League standard contract at the age of 16 years and 16 days. He made his professional debut the next day, in a substitute appearance against Cavalry FC, becoming the youngest player to appear in a CPL match at the age of 16 years and 17 days. He scored his first professional goal on June 2 against Pacific FC, becoming the league's youngest ever goal scorer, and was subsequently named to the CPL Team of the Week for the first time, becoming the youngest player to receive a TOTW nomination. He finished his first professional season with three goals in 20 appearances, including six starts. In January 2024, Tahid went on trial with the academy of Dutch club Feyenoord. In February 2025, he went on trial with Belgian side RWD Molenbeek. Over his three seasons with Vancouver FC, Tahid made 46 appearances and scored four goals for the club.

On September 10, 2025, it was announced that Tahid had joined Albanian side Skënderbeu Korçë of the Kategoria e Parë on a free transfer, with the potential for additional future compensation based on undisclosed conditions. He was initially assigned to the club's U19 squad, and scored a hat-trick on his debut for the U19 side on September 17, in a 10–0 away win over Inter Club d'Escaldes in the first round of the UEFA Youth League Domestic Champions Path.

In October 2026, he signed with Lithuanian club FK Be1 in the second tier I Lyga.

== International career ==
Tahid is eligible to represent Canada and Ghana at international level. In September 2023, he was called up to the Canada U17 team for the first time, ahead of a pair of friendlies against Brazil. He made his debut for the program on September 29, as a starter in the first friendly. In November 2023, Tahid was named to the roster for the 2023 FIFA U-17 World Cup. Tahid scored his first international goal against Argentina U17 in a friendly prior to the tournament, on November 5. He then started all three of the team's matches at the World Cup tournament.

On March 20, 2025, he made his debut with Ghana U20 at a friendly mini-tournament against Morocco U20. In April 2025, he was initially called up to the side for the 2025 U-20 Africa Cup of Nations (however, he ultimately did not join the squad).

In September 2025, he joined the Canada U18 team for a training camp in Finland.

== Personal life ==
During the 2025 season, Tahid wrote a series of articles for the Langley Advance Times, called Player's Diary, about his season with Vancouver FC, until his transfer to Skënderbeu Korçë in September 2025 (after which Thierno Bah took over the article series).

== Career statistics ==
As of July 19, 2025

Club	Season	League			Playoffs		Domestic Cup		Continental		Total	
Club	Season	Division	Apps	Goals	Apps	Goals	Apps	Goals	Apps	Goals	Apps	Goals
Vancouver FC	2023	Canadian Premier League	20	3	–		0	0	–		20	3
Vancouver FC	2024	Canadian Premier League	16	1	–		0	0	–		16	1
Vancouver FC	2025	Canadian Premier League	10	0	–		0	0	–		10	0
Total			46	4	0	0	0	0	0	0	46	4
Skënderbeu Korçë	2025–26	Kategoria e Parë	0	0	–		0	0	–		0	0
Career total			46	4	0	0	0	0	0	0	46	4
