= Lucas Dias (soccer, born 2003) =

Canadian soccer player

Personal information
- Full name: Lucas Filipe Silva Dias
- Date of birth: January 18, 2003 (age 23)
- Place of birth: Toronto, Ontario, Canada
- Height: 1.80 m (5 ft 11 in)
- Positions: Winger; attacking midfielder

Youth career
- 2011–2014: Sporting Academy Toronto
- 2014–2026: Sporting CP

Senior career*
Years	Team	Apps	(Gls)
2021–2026	Sporting CP B	16	(1)
2024	→ Cavalry FC (loan)	11	(0)
2024–2025	→ 1º Dezembro (loan)	5	(1)

International career^{‡}
2018	Portugal U16	1	(0)
2021	Canada U23	4	(0)
- * Club domestic league appearances and goals as of May 10, 2025 ‡ National team caps and goals as of March 29, 2021

Lucas Filipe da Silva Dias (born January 18, 2003) is a Canadian professional soccer player who plays as a winger or attacking midfielder.

== Early life ==
Born in Toronto, Dias is of Portuguese descent through both sets of grandparents. He began playing house league soccer at age four in Woodbridge. In 2011, he joined the new Sporting Academy Toronto, which was affiliated with Portuguese club Sporting CP, playing two years up. He attracted the attention of the Portuguese club, being invited for brief training stint's with the club's academy when he was nine, later joining the academy permanently at age 11, becoming the first player to move from the Toronto academy to the Portuguese academy. He signed a professional contract with the club at age 16.

== Club career ==
After signing his initial pro contract at age 16, he made his senior debut with Sporting B in a league match against Oriental Dragon in the third tier on May 29, 2021. In June 2021, he extended his contract with Sporting for an additional five years. He split the 2021–22 season between Sporting B in Liga 3 and Sporting U19, where he played in the UEFA Youth League. He scored his first goal for Sporting B on August 22, 2021, in a 1–0 victory against Caldas, earning man of the match honours. He made his debut for the Sporting first team on October 8, 2021, in a friendly against Torreense. He spent the 2022–23 season with the Sporting U23 in the national U23 league and was called up for a training session with the first team in April 2023.

In February 2024, he joined Canadian Premier League club Cavalry FC on loan for the 2024 season. He made his debut for Cavalry on February 27, in a CONCACAF Champions Cup match against Orlando City SC. He departed the club at the end of June, upon the expiry of his loan, having made 15 appearances across all competitions, recording two assists. In September 2024, he was loaned to Liga 3 club 1º Dezembro for the 2024-25 season.

== International career ==
Dias is eligible to represent both Canada and Portugal.

He made his debut for the Portugal U16 team on November 29, 2018, against Denmark U16.

In 2021, Dias was named to the Canada U23 team for the 2020 CONCACAF Men's Olympic Qualifying Championship at age 18. On March 19, 2021, he made his U23 debut against El Salvador U23. He made four appearances, as Canada failed to qualify after being defeated by Mexico U23 in the semi-finals. In May 2022, Dias was named to the 60-man preliminary squad for the Canada U20 for the 2022 CONCACAF U-20 Championship.

== Career statistics ==
As of May 10, 2025

Club	Season	League			National cup		Continental		Other		Total	
Club	Season	Division	Apps	Goals	Apps	Goals	Apps	Goals	Apps	Goals	Apps	Goals
Sporting CP B	2020–21	Campeonato de Portugal	1	0	—		—		—		1	0
Sporting CP B	2021–22	Liga 3	15	1	—		—		—		15	1
Sporting CP B	Total		16	1	—		—		—		16	1
Cavalry FC (loan)	2024	Canadian Premier League	11	0	3	0	1	0	—		15	0
1º Dezembro (loan)	2024–25	Liga 3	5	1	1	0	—		—		6	1
Career total			32	2	4	0	1	0	0	0	37	2
