= Olivier Rommens =

Belgian footballer (born 1995)

Personal information
- Date of birth: 3 February 1995 (age 31)
- Place of birth: Wommelgem, Belgium
- Height: 1.77 m (5 ft 10 in)
- Position: Midfielder

Youth career
- KFC Ranst
- 2002–2006: Lierse
- 2006–2014: PSV

Senior career*
Years	Team	Apps	(Gls)
2014–2016	Jong PSV	54	(2)
2016–2018	NAC Breda	23	(1)
2019–2021	TOP Oss	69	(3)
2021–2022	Sūduva	36	(5)
2023	Nõmme Kalju	24	(1)
2024	Balzan	14	(2)
2024	Vancouver FC	14	(0)
2025–2026	Milsami Orhei	5	(0)
- * Club domestic league appearances and goals as of 1 June 2026

Olivier Rommens (3 February 1995) is a Belgian professional football player who plays as a midfielder.

== Early life ==
Rommens began his youth career in Belgium with his hometown club KFC Ranst, followed by a four-year spell with Lierse. In 2006, at age ten, he moved to the Netherlands and joined the youth system of PSV Eindhoven.

== Club career ==
On 9 August 2014, Rommens made his professional debut in the Eerste Divisie with Jong PSV, also scoring his first goal.

In June 2016, he signed a two-year contract with an option for a third season with NAC Breda. In his first season, he began the year playing central defense, rather than his customary midfield position. After missing the 2017–18 season due to injury, in July 2018, he extended his contract with the club for another season. In December 2018, after not having made an appearance in the previous eighteen months, his contract was mutually terminated.

In January 2019, he signed a two-and-a-half year contract with TOP Oss in the Dutch second tier Eerste Divisie. He departed the club upon the expiry of his contract at the end of June 2021.

In July 2021, he signed with Lithuanian A Lyga club Sūduva until 2023. On 7 August 2021, he scored his first league goal against FK Panevėžys. The move gave him the opportunity to play at the continental level in the UEFA Conference League. In his first season, he helped the club to a second-place finish in the league. In January 2022, he won his first trophy after helping the club win the Lithuanian Supercup. After the expiry of his contract, he briefly returned to train with his former club TOP Oss in January 2023.

In February 2023, he signed a two-year contract with Estonian Meistriliiga club Nõmme Kalju. In late June, he suffered a meniscus injury, causing him to miss a few months of action. At the end of the 2023 season, he agreed to a mutual termination of the remaining year of his contract.

In January 2024, Rommens joined Maltese Premier League club Balzan on a free transfer.

In July 2024, he signed with Vancouver FC in the Canadian Premier League. His contract was for the remainder of the 2024 season with options for the following two seasons.

== Personal life ==
He is the older brother of Philippe Rommens, who is also a professional footballer.
