= 2021 Canadian Premier League final =

Soccer match

- Event: 2021 Canadian Premier League season
Forge FC	Pacific FC
0	1
- Date: December 5, 2021
- Venue: Tim Hortons Field, Hamilton, Ontario
- Man of the Match: Alessandro Hojabrpour (Pacific FC)
- Referee: Yusri Rudolf
- Attendance: 7,488
- Weather: Cloudy / Windy; 1 °C (34 °F); 75% humidity

The 2021 Canadian Premier League final was a soccer match which determined the winner of the 2021 Canadian Premier League season. It was played on December 5, 2021, in Hamilton, Ontario, between Forge FC and Pacific FC. Those teams qualified as the winners of their first round playoff matches. Forge FC were the defending champions.

Pacific FC defeated Forge FC 1–0 to claim their first CPL title. Alessandro Hojabrpour scored the game's only goal in the 59th minute and was named man of the match. Winning the championship earned the club the right to compete in the 2022 CONCACAF League where they ultimately reached the round of 16.

== Path to the final ==
Pos	Team	Pld	W	D	L	GF	GA	GD	Pts	Qualification
1	Forge (S)	28	16	2	10	39	24	+15	50	Advance to playoffs
2	Cavalry	28	14	8	6	34	30	+4	50	Advance to playoffs
3	Pacific (C)	28	13	6	9	47	34	+13	45	Advance to playoffs
4	York United	28	8	12	8	35	39	−4	36	Advance to playoffs
5	Valour	28	10	5	13	38	36	+2	35	
6	HFX Wanderers	28	8	11	9	28	34	−6	35	
7	FC Edmonton	28	6	10	12	34	41	−7	28	
8	Atlético Ottawa	28	6	8	14	30	47	−17	26	

Updated to match(es) played on unknown. Source: CanPL.ca
Rules for classification: 1) points; 2) total wins.
(C) Champions; (S) Regular season winner

Playoff semi-final results

Team 1	Score	Team 2
Cavalry FC	1–2 (a.e.t.)	Pacific FC
Forge FC	3–1	York United FC

=== Forge FC ===
Forge FC entered the Final as the two-time defending league champions, having defeated Cavalry FC in the 2019 Finals and HFX Wanderers FC in the 2020 Final. On October 26, Forge clinched a playoff berth while inactive and then secured 1st place in the regular season following a win on November 9. Forge advanced to the finals by defeating 4th ranked York United FC at home in the semi-finals.

=== Pacific FC ===
This was Pacific FC's first Final, improving from a fourth-place finish in 2020. On October 24, they became the 2nd team to qualify for the playoffs by virtue of a York United draw against Atlético Ottawa. Pacific finished 3rd in the regular season and advanced to the finals by defeating 2nd ranked Cavalry FC on the road in the semi-finals.

=== Head-to-head ===
This was the fourth meeting of the year between the two clubs with Forge having won all of the previous three games. Forge had the advantage in the all-time series with 8 wins, 1 draw, and 0 losses.

Forge earned the right to host the Final by having the better overall record in the regular season. Pacific entered the match on two weeks of rest since their previous match in the CPL semi-final. Forge had played two CONCACAF League matches following the semi-final, including an away match in Honduras four days before the CPL Final.

== Match details ==
=== Details ===
December 5
4:30 pm EST

Forge FC	0–1	Pacific FC
	Recap; Report	Hojabrpour 59'

Tim Hortons Field, Hamilton, Ontario
Attendance: 7,488
Referee: Yusri Rudolf

Forge	Pacific

Forge FC:
GK	1	(Canada) Triston Henry
RB	8	(Senegal) Elimane Cissé	(yellow card) 58'
CB	23	(Canada) Garven-Michée Metusala		(substituted off) 76'
CB	4	(Canada) Dominic Samuel
LB	6	(Canada) Kwame Awuah
CM	13	(Sweden) Alexander Achinioti-Jönsson
CM	10	(Canada) Kyle Bekker (c)
RW	99	(Panama) Omar Browne	(yellow card) 17' (yellow-red card) 90+1'
AM	19	(Canada) Tristan Borges		(substituted off) 68'
LW	18	(Canada) Molham Babouli
CF	14	(Guyana) Emery Welshman		(substituted off) 68'
Substitutes:
GK	31	(Canada) Baj Maan
MF	7	(Canada) David Choinière		(substituted on) 68'
FW	11	(Canada) Chris Nanco
DF	15	(Canada) Maxim Tissot
FW	17	(Canada) Woobens Pacius		(substituted on) 68'
MF	24	(Belgium) Paolo Sabak	(yellow card) 90+2'
FW	25	(Costa Rica) Joshua Navarro		(substituted on) 76'
Manager: (Canada) Bobby Smyrniotis

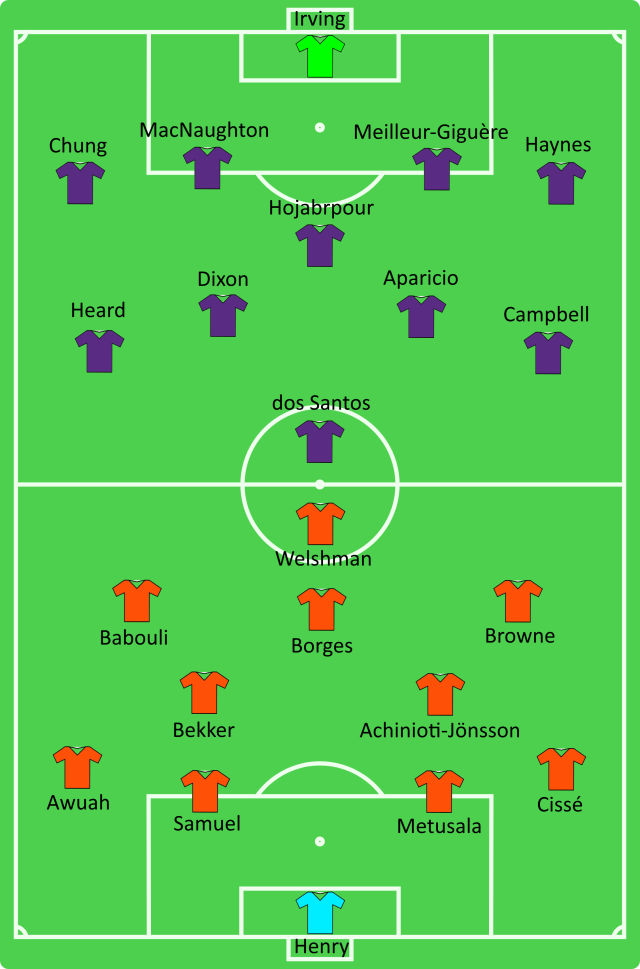

Pacific FC:
GK	13	(Canada) Callum Irving
RB	2	(Canada) Kadin Chung
CB	6	(Canada) Lukas MacNaughton
CB	26	(Canada) Thomas Meilleur-Giguère	(yellow card) 31'
LB	3	(Canada) Jordan Haynes
DM	21	(Canada) Alessandro Hojabrpour	(yellow card) 90+2'	(substituted off) 83'
RW	11	(Wales) Josh Heard		(substituted off) 76'
CM	22	(Canada) Jamar Dixon (c)
CM	34	(Canada) Manny Aparicio
LW	14	(Canada) Terran Campbell
CF	24	(Netherlands) Gianni dos Santos		(substituted off) 63'
Substitutes:
GK	31	(Canada) Isaac Boehmer
MF	8	(Canada) Matthew Baldisimo		(substituted on) 76'
MF	10	(Canada) Marco Bustos
DF	12	(Canada) Kunle Dada-Luke		(substituted on) 63'
MF	19	(Canada) Matteo Polisi
MF	20	(Canada) Sean Young	(yellow card) 90+2'	(substituted on) 83'
MF	23	(Northern Ireland) Ollie Bassett
Manager: (Norway) Pa-Modou Kah

Man of the Match:
Alessandro Hojabrpour (Pacific FC)

Assistant referees:
Gabrielle Lemieux
Stefan Tanaka-Freundt
Fourth official:
Pierre-Luc Lauzière

Match rules

- 90 minutes
- 30 minutes of extra time if necessary
- Penalty shoot-out if scores still level
- Maximum of five substitutions, with a sixth allowed in extra time

== See also ==
- Canadian Premier League Finals
- 2021 Canadian Championship Final
