= 2021 Forge FC season =

Forge FC
2021 season
- Chairman: Bob Young
- Head coach: Bobby Smyrniotis
- Stadium: Tim Hortons Field
- Canadian Premier League: 1st
- CPL Playoffs: Runner-up
- Canadian Championship: Semi-finals
- CONCACAF League: Semi-finals
- Top goalscorer: League: Molham Babouli; Woobens Pacius (7 goals each); All: Molham Babouli (10 goals)
- Highest home attendance: 7,488 vs. Pacific FC (December 5, CPL Final)
- Lowest home attendance: 2,104 vs. Cavalry FC (November 16, CPL)
- Average home league attendance: 3,490 (Note: The attendances for Forge vs. Pacific (September 25), Forge vs. Atlético Ottawa (October 16), and Forge vs. HFX Wanderers (October 30) have not been announced.)
- Biggest win: 4–0 vs. Atlético Ottawa (Home, August 25, CPL)
- Biggest defeat: Defeated by two goals in six matches.
Home colours	Away colours

The 2021 Forge FC season was the third season in the history of Forge FC. Forge were the defending league champions, having defeated HFX Wanderers FC in the 2020 Canadian Premier League Final. In addition to the domestic league, the club competed in the Canadian Championship and the CONCACAF League.

On November 2, Forge FC defeated Santos de Guápiles in the quarter-finals of the CONCACAF League to qualify for the 2022 edition of the CONCACAF Champions League, becoming the first Canadian Premier League club to do so. The club eventually bowed out of the competition in the semi-finals against Motagua.

On November 9, Forge defeated York United to clinch first place in the Canadian Premier League regular season. This secured Forge the CPL Shield, an honour that the league announced it will recognize retroactively.

== Squad ==
As of August 8, 2021

No.	Name	Nationality	Position(s)	Date of birth (age)	Previous club
Goalkeepers
1	Triston Henry	(Canada)	GK	September 8, 1993 (aged 28)	(Canada) Sigma FC
29	Christopher Kalongo	(Canada)	GK	January 7, 2002 (aged 19)	(Canada) Sigma FC
31	Baj Maan	(Canada)	GK	July 12, 2000 (aged 21)	(United States) NKU Norse
Defenders
2	Jonathan Grant	(Canada)	RB	October 15, 1993 (aged 28)	(Sweden) Nyköpings BIS
3	Dejan Jakovic	(Canada)	CB	July 16, 1985 (aged 36)	(United States) Los Angeles FC
4	Dominic Samuel	(Canada)	RB / CB	September 29, 1994 (aged 27)	(Canada) Sigma FC
5	Daniël Krutzen	(Belgium)	CB / LB	September 19, 1996 (aged 25)	(United States) Reading United
6	Kwame Awuah	(Canada)	LB / CM	December 2, 1995 (aged 26)	(United States) New York City FC
15	Maxim Tissot	(Canada)	LB / DM	April 13, 1992 (aged 29)	(Canada) Ottawa Fury
22	Monti Mohsen	(Canada)	LB	June 13, 2000 (aged 21)	(Canada) Sigma FC
23	Garven-Michée Metusala	(Canada)	DM / CB	December 31, 1999 (aged 22)	(Canada) AS Blainville
26	Santiago Frias	(Canada)	CB	June 20, 2003 (aged 18)	(Canada) Sigma FC
Midfielders
8	Elimane Oumar Cissé	(Senegal)	CM	March 12, 1995 (aged 26)	(Senegal) Diambars FC
10	Kyle Bekker	(Canada)	AM / CM	September 2, 1990 (aged 31)	(United States) North Carolina FC
12	Sebastian Castello	(Canada)	MF	October 8, 2003 (aged 18)	(Canada) Sigma FC
13	Alexander Achinioti-Jönsson	(Sweden)	DM	April 17, 1996 (aged 25)	(Sweden) IFK Värnamo
19	Tristan Borges	(Canada)	RW / LW / AM	August 26, 1998 (aged 23)	(Belgium) OH Leuven
24	Paolo Sabak	(Belgium)	AM	February 10, 1999 (aged 22)	(Netherlands) NEC Nijmegen
27	Johnny Son	(Canada)	CM	May 30, 2003 (aged 18)	(Canada) Sigma FC
Forwards
7	David Choinière	(Canada)	LW / RW	February 7, 1997 (aged 24)	(Canada) Montreal Impact
9	Kosi Nwafornso	(Nigeria)	CF	September 19, 1997 (aged 24)	(United States) Colorado Pride Switchbacks
11	Chris Nanco	(Canada)	ST / RW / LW	February 15, 1995 (aged 26)	(United States) Bethlehem Steel
14	Emery Welshman	(Guyana)	ST	November 9, 1991 (aged 30)	(Israel) Hapoel Ra'anana A.F.C.
17	Woobens Pacius	(Canada)	FW	May 11, 2001 (aged 20)	(Canada) CF Montréal Academy
18	Molham Babouli	(Canada)	CF / RW / LW	January 2, 1993 (aged 28)	(Canada) FC Ukraine United
21	Marcus Caldeira	(Canada)	FW	October 14, 2004 (aged 17)	(Canada) Sigma FC
25	Joshua Navarro	(Costa Rica)	CF	March 11, 1999 (aged 22)	(Costa Rica) Pérez Zeledón
28	Robbie Cleary	(Canada)	CF	May 15, 2003 (aged 18)	(Canada) Sigma FC
99	Omar Browne	(Panama)	CF / RW / LW	May 3, 1994 (aged 27)	(Panama) Independiente

== Transfers ==
=== In ===
==== Transferred in ====
No.	Pos.	Player	From club	Fee/notes	Date	Source
3	DF	(Canada) Dejan Jakovic	(United States) Los Angeles FC	Free	May 13, 2021	
9	FW	(Nigeria) Kosi Nwafornso	(United States) Colorado Pride Switchbacks	Free	June 23, 2021	
23	MF	(Canada) Garven-Michée Metusala	(Canada) Concordia Stingers	Selected 8th overall in the 2021 CPL–U Sports Draft	June 23, 2021	
26	DF	(Canada) Santiago Frias	(Canada) Sigma FC	Signed to a development contract	June 24, 2021	
27	MF	(Canada) Johnny Son	(Canada) Sigma FC	Free	June 24, 2021	
28	FW	(Canada) Robbie Cleary	(Canada) Sigma FC	Signed to a development contract	June 24, 2021	
12	MF	(Canada) Sebastian Castello	(Canada) Sigma FC	Signed to a development contract	July 30, 2021	
21	FW	(Canada) Marcus Caldeira	(Canada) Sigma FC	Signed to a development contract	July 30, 2021	
17	FW	(Canada) Woobens Pacius	(Canada) CF Montréal Academy	Free	August 8, 2021	
29	GK	(Canada) Christopher Kalongo	(Canada) Sigma FC	Signed to a development contract	September 11, 2021	
14	FW	(Guyana) Emery Welshman	(Israel) Hapoel Ra'anana A.F.C.	Free	September 14, 2021	
16	DF	(Canada) Klaidi Cela	(Canada) Sigma FC	Free	October 8, 2021	

==== Loans in ====
No.	Pos.	Player	Loaned from	Fee/notes	Date	Source
19	MF	(Canada) Tristan Borges	(Belgium) OH Leuven	Season-long loan	March 5, 2021	
25	FW	(Costa Rica) Joshua Navarro	(Costa Rica) Pérez Zeledón	Season-long loan	June 15, 2021	
99	FW	(Panama) Omar Browne	(Panama) Independiente	Season-long loan	June 16, 2021	
16	DF	(Canada) Klaidi Cela	(Canada) Sigma FC	Short term replacement player	August 4, 2021	
33	GK	(Canada) Corey Marques	(Canada) Sigma FC	Short term replacement player	September 3, 2021	

==== Draft picks ====
Forge FC selected the following players in the 2021 CPL–U Sports Draft on January 29, 2021. Draft picks are not automatically signed to the team roster. Only those who are signed to a contract will be listed as transfers in.

Round	Selection	Pos.	Player	Nationality	University
1	8	MF	Garven-Michée Metusala	Canada	Concordia Stingers
2	9	DF	José Maria Ribeiro da Cunha	Portugal	CBU Capers

=== Out ===
No.	Pos.	Player	To club	Fee/notes	Date	Source
14	DF	(Canada) David Edgar	Retired		December 8, 2020	
23	FW	(Canada) Anthony Novak	(Portugal) Clube Condeixa	Contract expired	February 12, 2021	
9	FW	(Canada) Marcel Zajac	(Poland) Watra Białka Tatrzańska	Contract expired	March 17, 2021	
16	DF	(Canada) Klaidi Cela	(Canada) Sigma FC	Contract expired	June 24, 2021	
17	FW	(Canada) Kadell Thomas	(Canada) Sigma FC	Contract expired	June 24, 2021	
20	FW	(Canada) Gabriel Balbinotti	(Canada) FC Lanaudière	Contract expired	June 24, 2021	
21	DF	(Canada) Jordan Dunstan		Contract expired	June 24, 2021	

== Competitions ==
Matches are listed in Hamilton local time: Eastern Daylight Time (UTC−4) until November 6, and Eastern Standard Time (UTC−5) otherwise.

=== Overview ===
Competition	First match	Last match	Starting round	Final position	Record							
Competition	First match	Last match	Starting round	Final position	Pld	W	D	L	GF	GA	GD	Win %
Canadian Premier League	June 27	November 16	Matchday 1	Winners	28	16	2	10	39	24	+15	57.14
CPL Playoffs	November 21	December 5	Semi-finals	Runner-up	2	1	0	1	3	2	+1	50.00
CONCACAF League	August 12	December 1	Preliminary round	Semi-finals	8	3	4	1	13	8	+5	37.50
Canadian Championship	September 15	October 27	Quarter-finals	Semi-finals	2	1	1	0	2	1	+1	50.00
Total					40	21	7	12	57	35	+22	52.50

Last updated: December 5, 2021
Source: Competitions

=== Canadian Premier League ===
==== Table ====
Pos	Team	Pld	W	D	L	GF	GA	GD	Pts	Qualification
1	Forge (S)	28	16	2	10	39	24	+15	50	Advance to playoffs
2	Cavalry	28	14	8	6	34	30	+4	50	Advance to playoffs
3	Pacific (C)	28	13	6	9	47	34	+13	45	Advance to playoffs
4	York United	28	8	12	8	35	39	−4	36	Advance to playoffs
5	Valour	28	10	5	13	38	36	+2	35	
6	HFX Wanderers	28	8	11	9	28	34	−6	35	
7	FC Edmonton	28	6	10	12	34	41	−7	28	
8	Atlético Ottawa	28	6	8	14	30	47	−17	26	

Updated to match(es) played on unknown. Source: CanPL.ca
Rules for classification: 1) points; 2) total wins.
(C) Champions; (S) Regular season winner

==== Results by match ====
Match	1	2	3	4	5	6	7	8	9	10	11	12	13	14	15	16	17	18	19	20	21	22	23	24	25	26	27	28
Result	L	L	W	W	L	W	W	L	W	L	W	D	W	W	L	W	L	W	W	W	L	W	D	W	W	W	L	L
Position	7	8	5	4	4	3	2	4	3	4	4	4	4	1	3	3	3	3	3	2	2	2	3	2	1	1	1	1

Source: #Matches
W = Win; D = Draw; L = Loss

==== Matches ====
June 27 1	Forge FC	0–2	Valour FC	Winnipeg, Manitoba
2:00pm	Jaković (yellow card) 6'; Bekker (yellow card) 31'; Nanco (yellow card) 90+2'	Report	Dyer 6' (pen.), (yellow card) 46'; Ricci 26'; Fordyce (yellow card) 32'	Stadium: IG Field; Attendance: 0 Referee: Filip Dujic

July 1 2	FC Edmonton	2–0	Forge FC	Winnipeg, Manitoba
8:00pm	Shome (yellow card) 29'; Soria 87'; Esua 90+4'	Report	Jaković (yellow card) 53'; Bekker (yellow card) 68'	Stadium: IG Field; Attendance: 0 Referee: Juan Marquez

July 4 3	Forge FC	3–0	Pacific FC	Winnipeg, Manitoba
7:00pm	Sabak (yellow card) 8'; Metusala (yellow card) 24'; Awuah (yellow card) 45'; Babouli 70'; Nanco 75'; Borges 80' (pen.)	Report	Bustos (yellow card) 74'	Stadium: IG Field; Attendance: 0 Referee: Carly Shaw-Maclaren

July 8 4	Cavalry FC	0–2	Forge FC	Winnipeg, Manitoba
8:00pm	Di Chiara (yellow card) 25'; Ledgerwood (yellow card) 90+1'	Report	Bekker 13', 35'; Achinioti-Jönsson (yellow card) 69'	Stadium: IG Field; Attendance: 0 Referee: Alain Ruch

July 11 5	Valour FC	1–0	Forge FC	Winnipeg, Manitoba
1:30pm	Ricci 56'; Peña (yellow card) 87'; Dyer (yellow card) 90+3'	Report	Sabak (yellow card) 45+2'; Bekker (yellow card) 90'; Navarro (yellow card) 90+3'	Stadium: IG Field; Referee: Carly Shaw-Maclaren

July 14 6	Forge FC	1–0	FC Edmonton	Winnipeg, Manitoba
10:00pm	Babouli 38' (pen.), (yellow card) 69'; Sabak (yellow card) 43'; Henry (yellow card) 77'; Awuah (yellow card) 90+1'	Report	Avila (yellow card) 36'	Stadium: IG Field; Attendance: 0 Referee: David Barrie

July 17 7	Pacific FC	1–2	Forge FC	Winnipeg, Manitoba
10:00pm	Polisi (yellow card) 26'; MacNaughton (yellow card) 43'; Dixon (yellow card) 56'; Heard 77'; Young (yellow card) 81'; Samake (yellow card) 90+2'	Report	Samuel (yellow card) 5'; Sabak 22' (pen.); Bekker 30'; Navarro (yellow card) 78'; Tissot (yellow card) 82'	Stadium: IG Field; Attendance: 0 Referee: Juan Marquez

July 22 8	Forge FC	1–2	Cavalry FC	Winnipeg, Manitoba
8:00pm	Henry (yellow card) 63'; Babouli 86' (pen.)	Report	Norman Jr. (yellow card) 6'; Novak 12', (yellow card) 63'; Musse 33'; Luca (yellow card) 45+4'; Escalante (yellow card) 86'; Simmons (yellow card) 90+2'; Farsi (yellow card) 90+5'	Stadium: IG Field; Attendance: 0 Referee: David Barrie

July 30 9	York United FC	0–1	Forge FC	Toronto, Ontario
7:00pm	Toussaint (yellow card) 19'; Zator (red card) 41'; Verhoeven (yellow card) 57'; Abzi (yellow card) 83'	Report	Babouli 4'; Grant (yellow card) 6'; Borges (yellow card) 79'; Henry (yellow card) 83'	Stadium: York Lions Stadium; Attendance: 1,710; Referee: Yusri Rudolf

August 4 10	Forge FC	0–1	York United FC	Hamilton, Ontario
7:00pm	Navarro (yellow card) 25'; Babouli (yellow card) 90+3'	Report	N'sa (yellow card) 5'; Rivero 54', (yellow card) 41' (yellow-red card) 64'; Ferrari (yellow card) 76'; Nikolaos Giantsopoulos (yellow card) 81'	Stadium: Tim Hortons Field; Attendance: 3,712; Referee: Fabrizio Stasolla

August 8 11	Forge FC	2–0	Atlético Ottawa	Hamilton, Ontario
1:00pm	Babouli 39' (pen.); Metusala 43'; Samuel (yellow card) 56'; Tissot (yellow card) 87'	Report	Martínez (yellow card) 45' (yellow-red card) 45+4'; Telfer (yellow card) 74'; Soto (yellow card) 83'	Stadium: Tim Hortons Field; Attendance: 4,618; Referee: Pierre-Luc Lauzière

August 22 12	Forge FC	1–1	HFX Wanderers FC	Hamilton, Ontario
4:00pm	Nanco (yellow card) 53'; Grant (yellow card) 55'; Awuah 90+6'	Report	Marshall 16'; Gagnon-Laparé (yellow card) 49'; Riggi (yellow card) 90'	Stadium: Tim Hortons Field; Attendance: 3,566; Referee: Serge Topalian

August 25 13	Forge FC	4–0	Atlético Ottawa	Hamilton, Ontario
8:00pm	Krutzen 44' (pen.); Pacius 54', 61'; Tissot (yellow card) 87'; Nanco 90+1'	Report	Kapor (yellow card) 36'; Shaw (yellow card) 81'; Martínez (yellow card) 86'	Stadium: Tim Hortons Field; Attendance: 3,165; Referee: Yusri Rudolf

August 28 14	Forge FC	3–1	York United FC	Hamilton, Ontario
4:00pm	Cissé (yellow card) 11'; Borges 14', (yellow card) 60'; Pacius 45'; Choinière 74'; Henry (yellow card) 90+2'	Report	Abzi 39'; Johnston (yellow card) 84'	Stadium: Tim Hortons Field; Attendance: 3,819; Referee: Pierre-Luc Lauzière

September 3 15	HFX Wanderers FC	2–0	Forge FC	Halifax, Nova Scotia
6:00pm	Karajovanovic 12'; Schaale 62'	Report	Cissé (yellow card) 15'; Bekker (yellow card) 28'	Stadium: Wanderers Grounds; Referee: Ben Hoskins

September 8 16	Atlético Ottawa	0–1	Forge FC	Ottawa, Ontario
7:00pm	Kapor (yellow card) 47'; Shaw (yellow card) 52'; Núñez (yellow card) 90+4'	Report	Samuel (yellow card) 55'; Pacius 65'	Stadium: TD Place Stadium; Referee: Filip Dujic

September 11 17	Forge FC	0–2	York United FC	Hamilton, Ontario
4:00pm	Grant (yellow card) 39'	Report	Johnston (yellow card) 38'; Ferrari 60'; Rivero 62'; Toussaint (yellow card) 78'; Abzi (yellow card) 83'	Stadium: Tim Hortons Field; Attendance: 3,449; Referee: Carly Shaw-MacLaren

September 25 18	Forge FC	2–1	Pacific FC	Hamilton, Ontario
7:00pm	Babouli 6'; Bekker (yellow card) 76'; Browne 80'; Krutzen (yellow card) 83'; Pacius (yellow card) 90+3'	Report	Díaz 38'; MacNaughton (yellow card) 90+2'	Stadium: Tim Hortons Field; Referee: Fabrizio Stasolla

October 3 19	Atlético Ottawa	0–3	Forge FC	Ottawa, Ontario
3:30pm		Report	Choinière 7'; Krutzen 52'; Pacius 80'; Babouli (yellow card) 82'	Stadium: TD Place Stadium; Referee: Yusri Rudolf

October 6 20	HFX Wanderers FC	0–1	Forge FC	Halifax, Nova Scotia
6:00pm	Rampersad (yellow card) 21'; Gagnon-Laparé (yellow card) 27'; Morelli (yellow card) 70'	Report	Babouli (yellow card) 24', (goal) 25'; Awuah (yellow card) 44'; Grant (yellow card) 61'; Nanco (yellow card) 84'	Stadium: Wanderers Grounds; Referee: Fabrizio Stasolla

October 11 21	Valour FC	3–1	Forge FC	Winnipeg, Manitoba
3:00pm	Romeo 5'; Akio 45'; Fordyce (yellow card) 51'; Baquero (yellow card) 58'; Dyer 59'; Galhardo (yellow card) 64'; Galán (yellow card) 87'	Report	Metusala 38'; Nanco (yellow card) 76'; Son (yellow card) 90'; Browne (yellow card) 90+2'; Borges (yellow card) 90+2'	Stadium: IG Field; Referee: Pierre-Luc Lauziere

October 16 22	Forge FC	2–0	Atlético Ottawa	Hamilton, Ontario
3:30pm	Awuah (yellow card) 19'; Borges (yellow card) 45+3'; Samuel (yellow card) 61'; Browne 62'; Cissé 74'	Report	Neufville (yellow card) 17'; Acosta (yellow card) 40'; Beckie (yellow card) 56'	Stadium: Tim Hortons Field; Referee: Yusri Rudolf

October 23 23	HFX Wanderers FC	0–0	Forge FC	Halifax, Nova Scotia
2:00pm		Report	Maan (yellow card) 20'; Samuel (yellow card) 76'	Stadium: Wanderers Grounds; Referee: David Barrie

October 30 24	Forge FC	4–1	HFX Wanderers FC	Hamilton, Ontario
1:00pm	Navarro 3', 15'; Choinière 25'; Castello 88'; Cela (yellow card) 90'	Report	Marshall 54'; Garcia (yellow card) 63'	Stadium: Tim Hortons Field; Referee: Pierre-Luc Lauzière

November 6 25	York United FC	1–2	Forge FC	Toronto, Ontario
1:00pm	Toussaint (yellow card) 17'; Abzi 29'; Johnston (yellow card) 90+6'	Report	Bekker (yellow card) 23'; Henry (yellow card) 30'; Cissé (yellow card) 40'; Pacius 51'; Sabak (yellow card) 69'; Choinière 81'; Welshman (yellow card) 90+5'; Borges (yellow card) 90+6'	Stadium: York Lions Stadium; Attendance: 1,126; Referee: Filip Dujic

November 9 26	York United FC	1–3	Forge FC	Toronto, Ontario
7:00pm	Wright 51'	Report	Borges 23'; Krutzen (yellow card) 36', (goal) 41'; Achinioti-Jönsson 73'	Stadium: York Lions Stadium; Attendance: 756; Referee: Yusri Rudolf

November 13 27	FC Edmonton	1–0	Forge FC	Edmonton, Alberta
2:00pm	Gorskie (yellow card) 61'; Temguia (yellow card) 75'; Ongaro 77'	Report	Navarro (yellow card) 43'	Stadium: Clarke Stadium; Attendance: 564; Referee: Juan Marquez

November 16 28	Forge FC	0–1	Cavalry FC	Hamilton, Ontario
6:00pm	Cela (yellow card) 25'; Achinioti-Jönsson (yellow card) 32'; Bekker (yellow card) 76'; Babouli (yellow card) 90+3'	Report	Novak 3'; Minatel (yellow card) 28'; Apostol (yellow card) 48'; Norman Jr. (yellow card) 75'	Stadium: Tim Hortons Field; Attendance: 2,104; Referee: Alain Ruch

==== Playoff matches ====
November 21 Semi-final	Forge FC	3–1	York United FC	Hamilton, Ontario
3:00pm	Pacius 9'; Navarro (yellow card) 60' (goal) 66'; Verhoeven 73' (o.g.)	Report	Petrasso 38'; Verhoeven (yellow card) 61'; N'sa (yellow card) 62'; Zator (yellow card) 75'; Johnston (yellow card) 85'; Abzi (yellow card) 88'; Ferrari (yellow card) 90+1'	Stadium: Tim Hortons Field; Attendance: 5,123; Referee: Juan Marquez

December 5 Final	Forge FC	0–1	Pacific FC	Hamilton, Ontario
4:30pm	Browne (yellow card) 17' (yellow-red card) 90+1'; Cissé (yellow card) 58'; Sabak (yellow card) 90+2'	Report	Meilleur-Giguère (yellow card) 31'; Hojabrpour 59' (yellow card) 90+2'; Young (yellow card) 90+2'	Stadium: Tim Hortons Field; Attendance: 7,488; Referee: Yusri Rudolf

=== CONCACAF League ===
==== Preliminary round ====
August 12 Leg 1	Forge FC (Canada)	3–1	(El Salvador) FAS	San Salvador, El Salvador
8:00 pm	Borges 15', (yellow card) 42'; Babouli 25'; Choinière 50'	Report	Flores 21', (yellow card) 89'	Stadium: Estadio Cuscatlán; Attendance: 0 Referee: Marco Ortiz
Note: The match was played behind closed doors.

August 17 Leg 2	FAS (El Salvador)	2–2 (3–5 agg.)	(Canada) Forge FC	San Salvador, El Salvador
10:15 pm	Reyes 13'; Torres (yellow card) 36', (goal) 56'; Meléndez (yellow card) 83'	Report	Navarro 49'; Samuel (yellow card) 59'; Grant 61'	Stadium: Estadio Cuscatlán; Referee: Benjamín Pineda

==== Round of 16 ====
September 21 Leg 1	Forge FC (Canada)	0–0	(Panama) Independiente	Hamilton, Ontario
8:00 pm	Borges (yellow card) 31'	Report	Aguila (yellow card) 74'	Stadium: Tim Hortons Field; Referee: Diego Montaño

September 28 Leg 2	Independiente (Panama)	0–2 (0–2 agg.)	(Canada) Forge FC	Panama City, Panamá
6:00 pm	Palacios (yellow card) 43'; Córdoba (yellow card) 51'	Report	Babouli 27', (red card) 45+1'; Bekker (yellow card) 51', (goal) 54'	Stadium: Estadio Nacional de Panamá; Referee: Keylor Herrera

==== Quarter-finals ====
October 20 Leg 1	Santos de Guápiles (Costa Rica)	3–1	(Canada) Forge FC	San José, Costa Rica
6:00 pm	East 12'; Samuel 17' (o.g.); Meneses (yellow card) 34'; B. López 52'	Report	Bekker 6'; Samuel (yellow card) 42'; Grant (yellow card) 72'; Achinioti-Jönsson (yellow card) 80'; Krutzen (yellow card) 90+1'	Stadium: Estadio Nacional de Costa Rica; Referee: Reon Radix

November 2 Leg 2	Forge FC (Canada)	3–0 (4–3 agg.)	(Costa Rica) Santos de Guápiles	Hamilton, Ontario
8:00 pm	Browne 28'; Achinioti-Jönsson (yellow card) 40'; Cissé (yellow card) 59'; Borges (yellow card) 63'; Babouli 65'; Navarro 82'	Report	Paradela (yellow card) 51'; Ruiz (yellow card) 61'; Rubio (yellow card) 67'	Stadium: Tim Hortons Field; Attendance: 4,162; Referee: Armando Villarreal

==== Semi-finals ====
November 24 Leg 1	Forge FC (Canada)	2–2	(Honduras) Motagua	Hamilton, Ontario
8:00 pm	Cissé (yellow card) 63'; Navarro 83'; Browne (yellow card) 90+1'; Awuah 90+3'	Report	López 43' (yellow card) 45'; Pereira 64'; Elvir (yellow card) 88'	Stadium: Tim Hortons Field; Referee: Luis Enrique Santander

December 1 Leg 2	Motagua (Honduras)	0–0 (2–2a agg.)	(Canada) Forge FC	Tegucigalpa, Honduras
8:00 pm	Moreira (yellow card) 39'	Report	Sabak (yellow card) 90'	Stadium: Estadio Tiburcio Carías Andino; Referee: José Torres

=== Canadian Championship ===
September 15 QF	Forge FC	2–1	Valour FC	Hamilton, Ontario
7:30pm	Choinière 33'; Pacius 38'; Sabak (yellow card) 90+4'	Report	Ricci 60'; Ohin (yellow card) 78'; Galhardo (yellow card) 83' (yellow-red card) 90+7'	Stadium: Tim Hortons Field; Attendance: 2,681; Referee: David Barrie

October 27 SF	Forge FC	0–0 (7–8 p)	CF Montréal	Hamilton, Ontario
7:30pm	Borges (yellow card) 58'	Report	Miljevic (yellow card) 38'; Piette (yellow card) 52'; Waterman (yellow card) 57'; Tabla (yellow card) 80'	Stadium: Tim Hortons Field; Attendance: 5,388; Referee: Yusri Rudolf
	Penalties
	Babouli (penalty missed); Krutzen (penalty scored); Awuah (penalty missed); Cissé (penalty scored); Bekker (penalty scored); Browne (penalty missed); Choinière (penalty scored); Navarro (penalty scored); Samuel (penalty scored); Achinioti-Jönsson (penalty scored); Henry (penalty missed)		(penalty scored) Lappalainen; (penalty missed) Johnsen; (penalty missed) Tabla; (penalty scored) Camacho; (penalty scored) Zouhir; (penalty missed) Piette; (penalty scored) Struna; (penalty scored) Bassong; (penalty scored) Bayiha; (penalty scored) Waterman; (penalty scored) Breza

== Statistics ==
=== Squad and statistics ===
As of December 5, 2021

No.	Pos	Nat	Player	Total		Canadian Premier League		CPL Playoffs		Canadian Championship		CONCACAF League	
No.	Pos	Nat	Player	Apps	Goals	Apps	Goals	Apps	Goals	Apps	Goals	Apps	Goals
1	GK	(Canada) CAN	Triston Henry	34	0	22+0	0	2+0	0	2+0	0	8+0	0
2	DF	(Canada) CAN	Jonathan Grant	25	1	15+4	0	0+0	0	1+0	0	5+0	1
3	DF	(Canada) CAN	Dejan Jakovic	5	0	5+0	0	0+0	0	0+0	0	0+0	0
4	DF	(Canada) CAN	Dominic Samuel	37	0	21+5	0	2+0	0	2+0	0	7+0	0
5	DF	(Belgium) BEL	Daniël Krutzen	27	3	18+1	3	1+0	0	2+0	0	5+0	0
6	DF	(Canada) CAN	Kwame Awuah	35	2	23+1	1	2+0	0	1+0	0	8+0	1
7	FW	(Canada) CAN	David Choinière	33	5	14+8	3	0+1	0	1+1	1	5+3	1
8	MF	(Senegal) SEN	Elimane Oumar Cissé	37	1	21+5	1	2+0	0	2+0	0	7+0	0
10	MF	(Canada) CAN	Kyle Bekker	37	5	23+3	3	2+0	0	2+0	0	7+0	2
11	FW	(Canada) CAN	Chris Nanco	24	2	7+11	2	0+1	0	0+0	0	0+5	0
12	MF	(Canada) CAN	Sebastian Castello	6	1	1+5	1	0+0	0	0+0	0	0+0	0
13	MF	(Sweden) SWE	Alexander Achinioti-Jönsson	36	1	23+2	1	2+0	0	2+0	0	7+0	0
14	FW	(Canada) CAN	Emery Welshman	17	0	5+5	0	1+0	0	1+1	0	2+2	0
15	DF	(Canada) CAN	Maxim Tissot	18	0	4+8	0	0+1	0	0+0	0	2+3	0
16	DF	(Canada) CAN	Klaidi Cela	6	0	2+3	0	0+1	0	0+0	0	0+0	0
17	FW	(Canada) CAN	Woobens Pacius	27	7	12+6	5	1+1	1	1+0	1	2+4	0
18	FW	(Canada) CAN	Molham Babouli	29	10	16+5	7	1+0	0	1+0	0	4+2	3
19	MF	(Canada) CAN	Tristan Borges	34	4	18+6	3	2+0	0	2+0	0	6+0	1
22	DF	(Canada) CAN	Monti Mohsen	8	0	2+6	0	0+0	0	0+0	0	0+0	0
23	DF	(Canada) CAN	Garven Metusala	32	2	20+4	2	1+0	0	1+0	0	4+2	0
24	MF	(Belgium) BEL	Paolo Sabak	29	1	16+7	1	0+0	0	0+1	0	1+4	0
25	FW	(Costa Rica) CRC	Joshua Navarro	32	6	11+9	2	1+1	1	0+2	0	4+4	3
26	DF	(Canada) CAN	Santiago Frias	2	0	0+2	0	0+0	0	0+0	0	0+0	0
27	MF	(Canada) CAN	Johnny Son	7	0	0+6	0	0+0	0	0+0	0	0+1	0
28	FW	(Canada) CAN	Robbie Cleary	5	0	0+5	0	0+0	0	0+0	0	0+0	0
31	GK	(Canada) CAN	Baj Maan	6	0	6+0	0	0+0	0	0+0	0	0+0	0
99	FW	(Panama) PAN	Omar Browne	15	3	3+4	2	2+0	0	1+0	0	4+1	1

=== Top scorers ===
Rank	Nat.	Player	Pos.	Canadian Premier League	CPL Playoffs	Canadian Championship	CONCACAF League	TOTAL
1	(Canada)	Molham Babouli	FW	7	0	0	3	10
2	(Canada)	Woobens Pacius	FW	6	1	1	0	8
3	(Canada)	David Choinière	FW	4	0	1	1	6
3	(Costa Rica)	Joshua Navarro	FW	2	1	0	3	6
5	(Canada)	Kyle Bekker	MF	3	0	0	2	5
6	(Canada)	Tristan Borges	MF	3	0	0	1	4
7	(Panama)	Omar Browne	FW	2	0	0	1	3
7	(Belgium)	Daniël Krutzen	DF	3	0	0	0	3
9	(Canada)	Chris Nanco	FW	2	0	0	0	2
9	(Canada)	Garven Metusala	DF	2	0	0	0	2
9	(Canada)	Kwame Awuah	DF	1	0	0	1	2
12	(Canada)	Jonathan Grant	DF	0	0	0	1	1
12	(Senegal)	Elimane Oumar Cissé	MF	1	0	0	0	1
12	(Canada)	Sebastian Castello	MF	1	0	0	0	1
12	(Belgium)	Paolo Sabak	MF	1	0	0	0	1
12	(Sweden)	Alexander Achinioti-Jönsson	MF	1	0	0	0	1
Own goals				0	1	0	0	1
Totals				39	3	2	13	57

=== Clean sheets ===
Rank	Nat.	Player	Canadian Premier League	CPL Playoffs	Canadian Championship	CONCACAF League	TOTAL
1	(Canada)	Triston Henry	8	0	1	4	13
2	(Canada)	Baj Maan	3	0	0	0	3
Totals			11	0	1	4	16

=== Disciplinary record ===
No.	Pos.	Nat.	Player	Canadian Premier League		CPL Playoffs		Canadian Championship		CONCACAF League		TOTAL	
No.	Pos.	Nat.	Player	Yellow card	Red card	Yellow card	Red card	Yellow card	Red card	Yellow card	Red card	Yellow card	Red card
1	GK	(Canada)	Triston Henry	5	0	0	0	0	0	0	0	5	0
2	DF	(Canada)	Jonathan Grant	4	0	0	0	0	0	1	0	5	0
3	DF	(Canada)	Dejan Jakovic	2	0	0	0	0	0	0	0	2	0
4	DF	(Canada)	Dominic Samuel	5	0	0	0	0	0	2	0	7	0
5	DF	(Belgium)	Daniël Krutzen	2	0	0	0	0	0	1	0	3	0
6	DF	(Canada)	Kwame Awuah	4	0	0	0	0	0	0	0	4	0
8	MF	(Senegal)	Elimane Oumar Cissé	3	0	1	0	0	0	2	0	6	0
10	MF	(Canada)	Kyle Bekker	7	0	0	0	0	0	1	0	8	0
11	FW	(Canada)	Chris Nanco	4	0	0	0	0	0	0	0	4	0
13	MF	(Sweden)	Alexander Achinioti-Jönsson	2	0	0	0	0	0	2	0	4	0
14	MF	(Guyana)	Emery Welshman	1	0	0	0	0	0	0	0	1	0
15	DF	(Canada)	Maxim Tissot	3	0	0	0	0	0	0	0	3	0
16	DF	(Canada)	Klaidi Cela	2	0	0	0	0	0	0	0	2	0
17	FW	(Canada)	Woobens Pacius	1	0	0	0	0	0	0	0	1	0
18	FW	(Canada)	Molham Babouli	5	0	0	0	0	0	0	1	5	1
19	MF	(Canada)	Tristan Borges	5	0	1	0	1	0	3	0	10	0
23	DF	(Canada)	Garven Metusala	1	0	0	0	0	0	0	0	1	0
24	MF	(Belgium)	Paolo Sabak	4	0	1	0	1	0	1	0	7	0
25	FW	(Costa Rica)	Joshua Navarro	4	0	1	0	0	0	0	0	5	0
27	MF	(Canada)	Johnny Son	1	0	0	0	0	0	0	0	1	0
31	GK	(Canada)	Baj Maan	1	0	0	0	0	0	0	0	1	0
99	FW	(Panama)	Omar Browne	1	0	2	0	0	0	1	0	4	0
Totals				67	0	6	0	2	0	14	1	89	1

== Honours ==
=== Canadian Premier League Awards ===
Name	Award	Status	Source
Kyle Bekker	Player of the Year	Nominated	
Triston Henry	Golden Glove	Nominated	
Bobby Smyrniotis	Coach of the Year	Nominated	

=== CONCACAF League Awards ===
Name	Award	Source
Molham Babouli	Team of the Tournament	

== Sources ==
- "2021 Forge FC Media Guide" (PDF). Forge FC. July 4, 2021. Archived (PDF) from the original on October 3, 2023.
