= 2020 Forge FC season =

Forge FC
2020 season
- Chairman: Bob Young
- Head coach: Bobby Smyrniotis
- Canadian Premier League: Champions
- CONCACAF League: Quarter-finals
- Top goalscorer: League: Kyle Bekker; Alexander Achinioti-Jönsson (3 goals each); All: Daniël Krutzen (4 goals)
Home colours	Away colours

The 2020 Forge FC season was the second season in the history of Forge FC. Forge were the defending league champions, having defeated Cavalry FC in the 2019 Canadian Premier League Finals. In addition to the domestic league, the club competed in the CONCACAF League, advancing to the quarter-finals for the first time.

On September 19, Forge defeated HFX Wanderers FC 2–0 in the 2020 Canadian Premier League Final to win their second consecutive league title. As champions, they qualified for the 2020 Canadian Championship Final and the 2021 CONCACAF League.

== Review ==
On January 22, Forge FC announced they had transferred reigning CPL Golden Boot and Player of the Year winner Tristan Borges to Belgian First Division B side Oud-Heverlee Leuven for a fee reported to be close to $300,000. Before the start of the new season, the club supplemented their roster with several new signings including K.R.C. Genk academy product Paolo Sabak, former Montreal Impact and Canada men's national soccer team fullback Maxim Tissot, and former Toronto FC attacker Molham Babouli.

=== Canadian Premier League: The Island Games ===
The Canadian Premier League originally announced its schedule on February 21. The season would have begun on April 11 and concluded on October 4 with a balanced, 28-match schedule. In response to the COVID-19 pandemic, the CPL paused all pre-season training on March 13 before later postponing the start of the season on March 20.

On July 29, the CPL announced a revised, shortened season format to be played exclusively at the University of Prince Edward Island from August 13 to September 19 in a bio-secure bubble. Dubbed The Island Games, the season would begin with a round-robin preliminary round. The top four teams would qualify for a round-robin group stage; the top two teams from the group stage would qualify for a single match final.

Forge FC's opening day starting lineup against Cavalry FC

Forge opened their season on August 13 with a 2–2 draw against rival club Cavalry FC in the opening match of The Island Games. Over the following weeks, Forge completed the CPL's preliminary round, ending with 2–2 draw against Valour FC to qualify for the second round group stage with a record of 3 wins, 3 draws, and 1 loss.

In the group stage, Forge opened with a 1–1 draw against HFX Wanderers FC before defeating Pacific FC 2–0 to put them on the verge of qualifying for the final. Needing just a draw in their final group stage match, Forge defeated Cavalry FC 1–0 to qualify for their second consecutive CPL final.

Forge faced HFX Wanderers FC in the 2020 Canadian Premier League final. This was the third match between the two clubs at The Island Games with both previous matches ending in 1–1 draws. Forge won the final 2–0 to repeat as CPL champions and qualify the club for the 2021 CONCACAF League and the 2020 Canadian Championship Final.

Following the season, captain Kyle Bekker was named the CPL's Player of the Year and goalkeeper Triston Henry was awarded the Golden Glove.

=== CONCACAF League ===
Forge qualified for the 2020 CONCACAF League by winning the 2019 Canadian Premier League finals to become CPL champions. This was their second consecutive season in the CONCACAF League after making it to the round of 16 in 2019.

The competition was originally scheduled to begin on July 28, but this was postponed due to the COVID-19 pandemic. On August 7, CONCACAF announced they had rescheduled the tournament to begin play on October 20 and conclude on January 28, 2021.

CONCACAF conducted the tournament draw on September 21. Due to travel restrictions introduced in response to the COVID-19 pandemic, all rounds of the tournament were played as single leg ties hosted by the higher seeded team. As the lowest seeded team, this guaranteed that Forge would not play any home games.

Forge opened its CONCACAF League run in the preliminary round away at Salvadoran club C.D. Municipal Limeño on October 22. David Choinière struck first for the Hammers, opening the scoring in the 21st minute before the Salvadorans tied the game later in the first half. Overcoming a 64th minute red card to Jonathan Grant, Forge won 2–1 to advance to the round of 16 thanks to an 83rd minute goal by Anthony Novak. After the match, Forge travelled directly to Panama City to prepare for their next match.

In the round of 16, Forge faced Panamanian side Tauro F.C. on November 3. Forge took an early lead once again, this time from a goal by Molham Babouli, before Tauro equalized in the 18th minute. Late in the second half, Novak drew a penalty for Forge which Daniël Krutzen converted in stoppage time to secure another 2–1 win for Forge. The win propelled Forge into the quarter-finals, a new best result for a CPL team.

Following a break when the team was able to return home, Forge returned to action on December 1 for a quarter-final matchup against Haitian club Arcahaie FC with a chance to qualify for the 2021 CONCACAF Champions League. The match was played in Santo Domingo, Dominican Republic as Arcahaie did not have a suitable venue. David Choinière drew a penalty just before halftime which Daniël Krutzen scored to give Forge the lead, however Arcahaie capitalized on a Triston Henry error in the 57th minute to tie the game. Despite outplaying their opponents, the game ended tied 1–1 and headed straight to penalties. Arcahaie's goalkeeper made two saves while their penalty takers converted all of their kicks to defeat Forge 4–2, knocking the Hammers out of the CONCACAF League.

Despite their elimination, Forge then travelled to Tegucigalpa, Honduras to face C.D. Marathón in a play-in match to qualify for one of the CONCACAF League's final two spots in the CONCACAF Champions League. This was centre-back David Edgar's final professional match as he had announced that he would retire at the end of the year. Marathón took the lead in the 18th minute from a header off of a free kick which proved to be the only goal in a 1–0 final, qualifying the Hondurans for the Champions League at Forge's expense. The match was "ill-tempered" with four yellow cards shown to Forge, three to Marathón, and both Kyle Bekker and coach Bobby Smyrniotis sent off late in the match.

== Squad ==
As of December 8, 2020

No.	Name	Nationality	Position(s)	Date of birth (age)	Previous club
Goalkeepers
1	Triston Henry	(Canada)	GK	September 8, 1993 (aged 27)	(Canada) Sigma FC
31	Baj Maan	(Canada)	GK	July 12, 2000 (aged 20)	(United States) NKU Norse
Defenders
2	Jonathan Grant	(Canada)	DF	October 15, 1993 (aged 27)	(Sweden) Nyköpings BIS
4	Dominic Samuel	(Canada)	DF	September 29, 1994 (aged 26)	(Canada) Sigma FC
5	Daniël Krutzen	(Belgium)	DF	September 19, 1996 (aged 24)	(United States) Reading United
6	Kwame Awuah	(Canada)	DF	December 2, 1995 (aged 25)	(United States) New York City FC
14	David Edgar	(Canada)	DF	May 19, 1987 (aged 33)	(England) Hartlepool United
15	Maxim Tissot	(Canada)	DF	April 13, 1992 (aged 28)	(Canada) Ottawa Fury
16	Klaidi Cela	(Canada)	DF	July 16, 1999 (aged 21)	(Canada) Sigma FC
21	Jordan Dunstan	(Canada)	DF	March 21, 1993 (aged 27)	(United States) Chattanooga FC
22	Monti Mohsen	(Canada)	DF	June 13, 2000 (aged 20)	(Canada) Sigma FC
Midfielders
8	Elimane Oumar Cissé	(Senegal)	MF	March 12, 1995 (aged 25)	(Senegal) Diambars FC
10	Kyle Bekker	(Canada)	MF	September 2, 1990 (aged 30)	(United States) North Carolina FC
13	Alexander Achinioti-Jönsson	(Sweden)	MF	April 17, 1996 (aged 24)	(Sweden) IFK Värnamo
Forwards
7	David Choinière	(Canada)	FW	February 7, 1997 (aged 23)	(Canada) Montreal Impact
9	Marcel Zajac	(Canada)	FW	April 29, 1998 (aged 22)	(United States) Akron Zips
11	Chris Nanco	(Canada)	FW	February 15, 1995 (aged 25)	(United States) Bethlehem Steel
17	Kadell Thomas	(Canada)	FW	November 26, 1996 (aged 24)	(Canada) Sigma FC
19	Molham Babouli	(Canada)	FW	January 2, 1993 (aged 27)	(Canada) FC Ukraine United
20	Gabriel Balbinotti	(Canada)	FW	April 12, 1998 (aged 22)	(Canada) UQTR Patriotes
23	Anthony Novak	(Canada)	FW	March 27, 1994 (aged 26)	(Canada) Oakville Blue Devils
24	Paolo Sabak	(Belgium)	FW	February 10, 1999 (aged 21)	(Netherlands) NEC Nijmegen

== Transfers ==
=== In ===
No.	Pos.	Player	Transferred from	Fee/notes	Date	Source
–	GK	(Canada) David Monsalve	(Canada) Ottawa Fury	Free transfer	March 2, 2020	
24	MF	(Belgium) Paolo Sabak	(Netherlands) NEC Nijmegen	Free transfer	April 23, 2020	
15	DF	(Canada) Maxim Tissot	(Canada) Ottawa Fury	Free transfer	July 22, 2020	
31	GK	(Canada) Baj Maan	(United States) NKU Norse	Free transfer	July 31, 2020	
21	DF	(Canada) Jordan Dunstan	(United States) Chattanooga FC	Free transfer	July 31, 2020	
20	FW	(Canada) Gabriel Balbinotti	(Canada) UQTR Patriotes	Selected 7th overall in the 2019 CPL–U Sports Draft	July 31, 2020	
19	FW	(Canada) Molham Babouli	Unattached	Free transfer	August 4, 2020	

==== Draft picks ====
Forge FC selected the following players in the 2019 CPL–U Sports Draft. Draft picks are not automatically signed to the team roster. Only those who are signed to a contract will be listed as transfers in.

Round	Selection	Pos.	Player	Nationality	University
1	7	FW	Gabriel Balbinotti	Canada	UQTR Patriotes
2	8	MF	Alex Zis	Canada	Guelph Gryphons

=== Out ===
No.	Pos.	Player	Transferred to	Fee/notes	Date	Source
18	GK	(Guyana) Quillan Roberts		Contract expired	January 8, 2020	
21	DF	(Cameroon) Bertrand Owundi		Contract expired	January 8, 2020	
20	MF	(Canada) Justin Stoddart		Contract expired	January 8, 2020	
19	MF	(Canada) Tristan Borges	(Belgium) OH Leuven	Undisclosed	January 22, 2020	
8	MF	(Canada) Giuliano Frano		Contract terminated by mutual consent	July 30, 2020	
–	GK	(Canada) David Monsalve	(Guatemala) Xelajú MC	Undisclosed	July 31, 2020	

== Club ==
=== Kits ===
Forge FC unveiled its 2020 primary kit on February 27 at an event hosted at Tim Hortons Field. The kit was inspired by Hamilton's six regional municipalities and featured a gold patch signifying Forge's status as defending champions.

The CPL unveiled all of its clubs' alternate kits on July 30. These "City Edition" kits incorporated unique symbolism for each club, with Forge's kit drawing from the image of Hamilton's Gore Park fountain. Like the home kit, the alternate kit featured a gold champion patch.

The kits continued to be produced by Macron and sponsored by Tim Hortons for a second consecutive season.

Home	Home Alt.	Away

== Competitions ==
Matches are listed in Hamilton local time: Eastern Daylight Time (UTC−4) from April to October and Eastern Standard Time (UTC-5) otherwise.

=== Overview ===
Competition	First match	Last match	Starting round	Final position	Record							
Competition	First match	Last match	Starting round	Final position	Pld	W	D	L	GF	GA	GD	Win %
Canadian Premier League	August 13	September 19	First stage	Winners	11	6	4	1	19	10	+9	54.55
CONCACAF League	October 22	December 8	Preliminary round	Quarterfinals	4	2	1	1	5	4	+1	50.00
Total					15	8	5	2	24	14	+10	53.33

Last updated: December 8, 2020
Source: Competitions

=== Canadian Premier League ===
==== First stage ====
===== Table =====
Pos	Team	Pld	W	D	L	GF	GA	GD	Pts	Qualification
1	Cavalry	7	4	1	2	10	7	+3	13	Advance to group stage
2	HFX Wanderers	7	3	3	1	12	7	+5	12 (Note: Head-to-head points: HFX Wanderers 1, Forge 1. Goal differential: HFX Wanderers +5, Forge +4)	Advance to group stage
3	Forge	7	3	3	1	13	9	+4	12	Advance to group stage
4	Pacific	7	3	2	2	10	8	+2	11	Advance to group stage
5	York9	7	2	4	1	8	7	+1	10	
6	Valour	7	2	2	3	8	9	−1	8 (Note: Head-to-head points: Valour 3, Atlético Ottawa 0.)	
7	Atlético Ottawa	7	2	2	3	7	12	−5	8	
8	FC Edmonton	7	0	1	6	5	14	−9	1	

Source: CanPL.ca
Rules for classification: 1) points; 2) head-to-head points; 3) goal differential; 4) goals for; 5) total wins; 6) U-21 minutes; 7) coin toss or drawing of lots.

===== Results by match =====
Match	1	2	3	4	5	6	7
Result	D	W	D	W	L	W	D
Position	1	1	1	1	2	1	2

Source: #Matches
W = Win; D = Draw; L = Loss

===== Matches =====
Forge FC's opening match against Cavalry FC was announced on July 29. The rest of the first stage schedule was announced on August 10.

August 13 1	Forge FC	2–2	Cavalry FC	Charlottetown, Prince Edward Island
8:00pm	Zajac (yellow card) 15'; Novak 26'; Krutzen (yellow card) 58'; Bekker 71'; Grant (yellow card) 75'; Samuel (yellow card) 90+3'	Report	Adekugbe (yellow card) 6'; Zator 11'; Mavila 90+4' (pen.)	Stadium: Alumni Field; Referee: Yusri Rudolf

August 16 2	Forge FC	2–0	FC Edmonton	Charlottetown, Prince Edward Island
3:00pm	Awuah 11'; Samuel (yellow card) 40'; Moses 90+2' (o.g.)	Report		Stadium: Alumni Field; Referee: Carly Shaw-MacLaren

August 19 3	HFX Wanderers FC	1–1	Forge FC	Charlottetown, Prince Edward Island
8:00pm	Beaulieu (yellow card) 15'; Béland-Goyette (yellow card) 44'; Garcia 47'; Schaale (yellow card) 90+4'	Report	Sabak 16' (pen.); Zajac (yellow card) 48'; Cela (yellow card) 90'	Stadium: Alumni Field; Referee: David Barrie

August 22 4	Forge FC	2–1	Pacific FC	Charlottetown, Prince Edward Island
4:00pm	Nanco 18'; Edgar (yellow card) 37'; Bekker 90+7'	Report	Dixon 26', (yellow card) 73'; Bustos (yellow card) 45'; Verhoven (yellow card) 71'	Stadium: Alumni Field; Referee: Matthew Souaré

August 26 5	York9 FC	3–2	Forge FC	Charlottetown, Prince Edward Island
1:00pm	Porter 27'; Di Chiara 34', 60' (pen.); Aparicio (yellow card) 54'	Report	Edgar (yellow card) 40'; Nanco 49'; Achinioti-Jönsson 52'; Awuah (yellow card) 72'; Tissot (yellow card) 90+2'	Stadium: Alumni Field; Referee: Juan Marquez

August 30 6	Atlético Ottawa	0–2	Forge FC	Charlottetown, Prince Edward Island
3:00pm	Khabra (yellow card) 39'; John (yellow card) 86'	Report	Krutzen 35'; Thomas (yellow card) 65'; Choinière 89'	Stadium: Alumni Field; Referee: Carly Shaw-MacLaren

September 5 7	Forge FC	2–2	Valour FC	Charlottetown, Prince Edward Island
12:00pm	Bekker 8'; Achinioti-Jönsson 65'	Report	Le Bourhis 14'; Dyer 27'; Aird (yellow card) 43'; Gutiérrez (yellow card) 59'; Galán (yellow card) 71'	Stadium: Alumni Field; Referee: David Barrie

==== Group stage ====
===== Table =====
Pos	Team	Pld	W	D	L	GF	GA	GD	Pts	Qualification
1	Forge	3	2	1	0	4	1	+3	7	Advance to final
2	HFX Wanderers	3	1	1	1	3	7	−4	4	Advance to final
3	Cavalry	3	1	0	2	4	4	0	3 (Note: Head-to-head points: Cavalry 3, Pacific 0.)	
4	Pacific	3	1	0	2	6	5	+1	3	

Source: CanPL.ca
Rules for classification: 1) points; 2) head-to-head points; 3) goal differential; 4) goals for; 5) total wins; 6) U-21 minutes; 7) coin toss or drawing of lots.

===== Results by round =====
Round	1	2	3
Result	D	W	W
Position	2	1	1

Source: #Matches
W = Win; D = Draw; L = Loss

===== Matches =====
The group stage schedule was announced on September 6.

September 9 1	HFX Wanderers FC	1–1	Forge FC	Charlottetown, Prince Edward Island
1:00pm	Garcia 2'; Ruby (yellow card) 56'	Report	Sabak (yellow card) 43', (goal) 56' (pen.); Edgar (yellow card) 71'	Stadium: Alumni Field; Referee: Myriam Marcotte

September 12 2	Forge FC	2–0	Pacific FC	Charlottetown, Prince Edward Island
12:00pm	Krutzen 35' (pen.); Balbinotti (yellow card) 43'; Novak 71'; Achinioti-Jönsson (yellow card) 84'	Report	Chung (yellow card) 34'; Young (yellow card) 36'	Stadium: Alumni Field; Referee: Juan Marquez

September 15 3	Cavalry FC	0–1	Forge FC	Charlottetown, Prince Edward Island
1:00pm	Hernández (yellow card) 90+2'	Report	Babouli 27'; Bekker (yellow card) 35'; Edgar (yellow card) 69'	Stadium: Alumni Field; Referee: Filip Dujic

==== Final ====
September 19 2020 CPL Final	Forge FC	2–0	HFX Wanderers FC	Charlottetown, Prince Edward Island
3:00pm	Grant (yellow card) 58'; Achinioti-Jönsson 60'; Edgar (yellow card) 65'; Tissot 90'	Report		Stadium: Alumni Field; Referee: Juan Marquez

=== CONCACAF League ===
CONCACAF conducted the CONCACAF League draw on September 21.

==== Preliminary round ====
The preliminary round schedule was announced on September 29.

October 22	Municipal Limeño (El Salvador)	1–2	(Canada) Forge FC	San Salvador, El Salvador
8:15 pm	K. Oviedo 38'; Alas (yellow card) 68'	Report	Grant (yellow card) 16' (yellow-red card) 64'; Choinière 21'; Babouli (yellow card) 62'; Novak 83'	Stadium: Estadio Cuscatlán; Referee: Selvin Brown (Honduras)

==== Round of 16 ====
The round of 16 schedule was announced on October 27.

November 3	Tauro (Panama)	1–2	(Canada) Forge FC	Panama City, Panama
8:00 pm	Aguilar 18'; Niño (yellow card) 54'; Simons (yellow card) 54'	Report	Babouli 11'; Krutzen 90+1' (pen.)	Stadium: Estadio Rommel Fernández; Referee: Nima Saghafi (United States)

==== Quarterfinals ====
The quarterfinals schedule was announced on November 5.

December 1	Arcahaie (Haiti)	1–1 (4–2 p)	(Canada) Forge FC	Santo Domingo, Dominican Republic
8:00 pm	Anacius (yellow card) 40'; Paul (yellow card) 44'; Jolicoeur 59'	Report	Krutzen 45+1' (pen.); Bekker (yellow card) 90+3'	Stadium: Estadio Olímpico Félix Sánchez; Referee: Oshane Nation (Jamaica)
	Penalties
	Thomas (penalty scored); Alesy (penalty scored); Anacius (penalty scored); Charles (penalty scored)		(penalty missed) Krutzen; (penalty missed) Achinioti-Jönsson; (penalty scored) Edgar; (penalty scored) Babouli

==== Play-in round ====
The play-in round schedule was announced on December 4.

December 8	Marathón (Honduras)	1–0	(Canada) Forge FC	Tegucigalpa, Honduras
10:00 pm	Solano 18'; Garrido (yellow card) 69'; Vega (yellow card) 71'; Arriaga (yellow card) 90+4'	Report	Edgar (yellow card) 64'; Nanco (yellow card) 66'; Bekker (red card) 86'	Stadium: Estadio Tiburcio Carías Andino; Referee: Bryan López (Guatemala)

=== Canadian Championship ===
The 2020 Canadian Championship was played as a one-game final between Forge as the CPL Champions and Toronto FC as the winner of a head-to-head series between Canadian teams from Major League Soccer. It was delayed until June 2022 due to scheduling difficulties related to the COVID-19 pandemic. Forge ultimately lost the final in a penalty shoot-out following a 1–1 draw.

== Statistics ==
=== Squad and statistics ===
As of December 10, 2020

No.	Pos	Nat	Player	Total		Canadian Premier League		CONCACAF League	
No.	Pos	Nat	Player	Apps	Goals	Apps	Goals	Apps	Goals
1	GK	(Canada) CAN	Triston Henry	14	0	10+0	0	4+0	0
2	DF	(Canada) CAN	Jonathan Grant	7	0	4+0	0	3+0	0
4	DF	(Canada) CAN	Dominic Samuel	14	0	8+2	0	3+1	0
5	DF	(Belgium) BEL	Daniël Krutzen	15	4	11+0	2	4+0	2
6	DF	(Canada) CAN	Kwame Awuah	14	1	9+2	1	3+0	0
7	MF	(Canada) CAN	David Choinière	15	2	6+5	1	4+0	1
8	MF	(Senegal) SEN	Elimane Oumar Cissé	10	0	6+2	0	1+1	0
9	FW	(Canada) CAN	Marcel Zajac	4	0	4+0	0	0+0	0
10	MF	(Canada) CAN	Kyle Bekker	15	3	11+0	3	4+0	0
11	FW	(Canada) CAN	Chris Nanco	7	2	5+0	2	0+2	0
13	MF	(Sweden) SWE	Alexander Achinioti-Jönsson	15	3	9+2	3	4+0	0
14	DF	(Canada) CAN	David Edgar	14	0	10+0	0	4+0	0
15	DF	(Canada) CAN	Maxim Tissot	14	1	3+8	1	1+2	0
16	DF	(Canada) CAN	Klaidi Cela	2	0	0+2	0	0+0	0
17	FW	(Canada) CAN	Kadell Thomas	13	0	1+8	0	3+1	0
19	FW	(Canada) CAN	Molham Babouli	14	2	4+6	1	4+0	1
20	FW	(Canada) CAN	Gabriel Balbinotti	6	0	3+3	0	0+0	0
21	DF	(Canada) CAN	Jordan Dunstan	9	0	2+4	0	0+3	0
22	DF	(Canada) CAN	Monti Mohsen	4	0	3+0	0	0+1	0
23	FW	(Canada) CAN	Anthony Novak	12	3	4+5	2	0+3	1
24	MF	(Belgium) BEL	Paolo Sabak	15	2	8+3	2	2+2	0
31	GK	(Canada) CAN	Baj Maan	1	0	1+0	0	0+0	0

=== Top scorers ===
Rank	Nat.	Player	Pos.	Canadian Premier League	CONCACAF League	TOTAL
1	(Belgium)	Daniël Krutzen	DF	2	2	4
2	(Canada)	Kyle Bekker	MF	3	0	3
2	(Sweden)	Alexander Achinioti-Jönsson	MF	3	0	3
2	(Canada)	Anthony Novak	FW	2	1	3
5	(Canada)	Chris Nanco	FW	2	0	2
5	(Belgium)	Paolo Sabak	MF	2	0	2
5	(Canada)	David Choinière	FW	1	1	2
5	(Canada)	Molham Babouli	FW	1	1	2
9	(Canada)	Kwame Awuah	DF	1	0	1
9	(Canada)	Maxim Tissot	MF	1	0	1
Own goals				1	0	1
Totals				19	5	24

Updated to match played December 8, 2020
Source: Canadian Premier League

=== Top assists ===
Rank	Nat.	Player	Pos.	Canadian Premier League	CONCACAF League	TOTAL
1	(Canada)	Molham Babouli	FW	2	1	3
2	(Belgium)	Paolo Sabak	MF	2	0	2
2	(Canada)	Maxim Tissot	DF	2	0	2
4	(Canada)	David Choinière	MF	1	0	1
4	(Canada)	Kadell Thomas	FW	1	0	1
4	(Canada)	Kyle Bekker	MF	1	0	1
4	(Canada)	Dominic Samuel	DF	0	1	1
Totals				9	2	11

Updated to match played December 8, 2020
Source: Canadian Premier League

=== Clean sheets ===
Rank	Nat.	Player	Canadian Premier League	CONCACAF League	TOTAL
1	(Canada)	Triston Henry	5	0	5
Totals			5	0	5

Updated to match played December 8, 2020
Source: Canadian Premier League

=== Disciplinary record ===
No.	Pos.	Nat.	Player	Canadian Premier League		CONCACAF League		TOTAL	
No.	Pos.	Nat.	Player	Yellow card	Red card	Yellow card	Red card	Yellow card	Red card
2	DF	(Canada)	Jonathan Grant	2	0	1	1	3	1
4	DF	(Canada)	Dominic Samuel	2	0	1	0	3	0
5	DF	(Belgium)	Daniël Krutzen	1	0	0	0	1	0
6	DF	(Canada)	Kwame Awuah	1	0	0	0	1	0
9	FW	(Canada)	Marcel Zajac	2	0	0	0	2	0
10	MF	(Canada)	Kyle Bekker	1	0	1	1	2	1
11	FW	(Canada)	Chris Nanco	0	0	1	0	1	0
13	MF	(Sweden)	Alexander Achinioti-Jönsson	1	0	0	0	1	0
14	DF	(Canada)	David Edgar	5	0	1	0	6	0
15	DF	(Canada)	Maxim Tissot	1	0	1	0	2	0
16	DF	(Canada)	Klaidi Cela	1	0	0	0	1	0
17	FW	(Canada)	Kadell Thomas	1	0	0	0	1	0
19	FW	(Canada)	Molham Babouli	0	0	1	0	1	0
20	FW	(Canada)	Gabriel Balbinotti	1	0	0	0	1	0
24	MF	(Belgium)	Paolo Sabak	1	0	0	0	1	0
Totals				20	0	7	2	27	2

Updated to match played December 8, 2020
Source: Canadian Premier League

== Honours ==
=== Canadian Premier League Awards ===
Name	Award	Status	Source
Kyle Bekker	Player of the Year	Won	
Triston Henry	Golden Glove	Won	
Bobby Smyrniotis	Coach of the Year	Nominated	

== Sources ==
- Butko, Louie (December 30, 2020). "2020 Forge FC Year in Review". Forge FC. Archived from the original on December 30, 2020.
- O'Connor-Clarke, Charlie (December 23, 2020). "Forge FC: 2020 season in review". Canadian Premier League. Archived from the original on December 31, 2020.
