= Sebastian Castello =

Sebastian Castello may refer:

- Sebastian Castello (soccer) (born 2003), Canadian soccer player
- Sebastian Castellio (1515–1563), sometimes known as Sebastian Castello, French preacher and theologian
