= Baj Maan =

Canadian soccer player (born 2000)

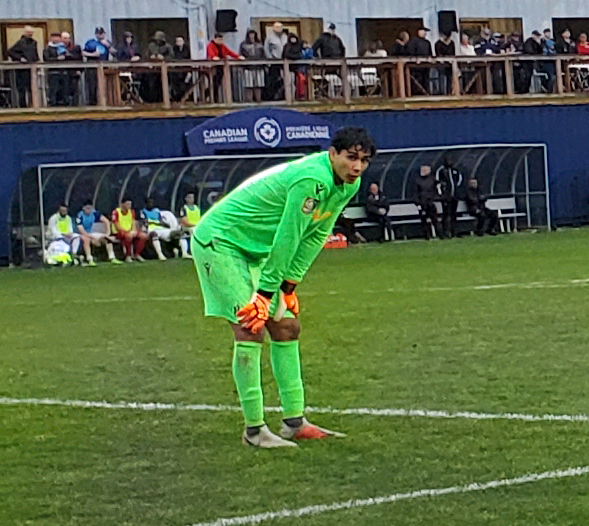
- Baj Maan with Forge FC in 2021

Personal information
- Full name: Baj Singh Maan
- Date of birth: July 12, 2000 (age 26)
- Place of birth: Brampton, Ontario, Canada
- Height: 1.90 m (6 ft 3 in)
- Position: Goalkeeper

Youth career
- Rexdale SC
- Brampton East SC
- 2015–2019: Sigma FC

College career
| Years | Team | Apps | (Gls) |
| 2019 | Northern Kentucky Norse | 17 | (0) |

Senior career*
| Years | Team | Apps | (Gls) |
| 2016–2019 | Sigma FC | 10 | (0) |
| 2019–2022 | Forge FC | 7 | (0) |
| 2022 | Toronto FC II | 0 | (0) |
| 2023 | Simcoe County Rovers FC | 19 | (0) |
| 2023 | Toronto FC II | 0 | (0) |
| 2024 | Valour FC | 0 | (0) |
| 2024 | Vaughan Azzurri | 10 | (0) |
- * Club domestic league appearances and goals as of September 1, 2024

Baj Singh Maan (born July 12, 2000) is a Canadian professional soccer player who plays as a goalkeeper.

== Early life ==
Maan grew up in Brampton, Ontario. In 2015, he joined the Sigma FC Academy.

== Club career ==
In 2016, he began playing at the senior level with Sigma FC in League1 Ontario.

In June 2019, Maan signed a developmental contract with Canadian Premier League side Forge FC, managed by former Sigma FC coach Bobby Smyrniotis. As the third-string keeper behind Triston Henry and Quillan Roberts, he failed to make an appearance that year. That fall, he attended Northern Kentucky University, where he started in seventeen matches. In July 2020, Maan re-signed with Forge FC ahead of the delayed 2020 season. He made his professional debut on September 5, 2020 in a 2–2 draw against Valour FC. Maan re-signed with Forge FC for the 2022 season and served as an unused substitute for the club's CONCACAF Champions League matches against Cruz Azul. However, during the club's first match of the CPL season, OneSoccer broadcaster Adam Jenkins announced that Maan had left the club and was trialling at Toronto FC II.

Maan's trial was ultimately successful as he signed an MLS Next Pro contract with Toronto FC II in May 2022.

After leaving the club at the end of the season, in February 2023, Maan went on trial with Canadian Premier League side Pacific FC during their pre-season camp. He subsequently joined the Simcoe County Rovers of League1 Ontario, with whom he won the league championship and was named the league's Goalkeeper of the Year and a First Team All-Star. After the season, he signed a short-term contract for the remainder of the season with Toronto FC II.

In 2024, he served as a backup keeper for Valour FC due to the injury to starter Jonathan Viscosi. Afterwards, he joined Vaughan Azzurri in League1 Ontario. He helped Vaughan capture the league cup, defeating Simcoe County Rovers FC in the final.

== Career statistics ==
As of September 6, 2024

Club statistics
| Club | Season | League | | | Playoffs | | National Cup | | Other | | Total | |
| Club | Season | Division | Apps | Goals | Apps | Goals | Apps | Goals | Apps | Goals | Apps | Goals |
|---|---|---|---|---|---|---|---|---|---|---|---|---|
| Sigma FC | 2016 | League1 Ontario | 1 | 0 | — | | — | | — | | 1 | 0 |
| Sigma FC | 2017 | League1 Ontario | 2 | 0 | — | | — | | — | | 2 | 0 |
| Sigma FC | 2018 | League1 Ontario | 0 | 0 | — | | — | | — | | 0 | 0 |
| Sigma FC | 2019 | League1 Ontario | 7 | 0 | 0 | 0 | — | | — | | 7 | 0 |
| Sigma FC | Total | | 10 | 0 | 0 | 0 | 0 | 0 | 0 | 0 | 10 | 0 |
| Forge FC | 2019 | Canadian Premier League | 0 | 0 | 0 | 0 | 0 | 0 | 0 | 0 | 0 | 0 |
| Forge FC | 2020 | Canadian Premier League | 1 | 0 | 0 | 0 | — | | 0 | 0 | 1 | 0 |
| Forge FC | 2021 | Canadian Premier League | 6 | 0 | 0 | 0 | 0 | 0 | 0 | 0 | 6 | 0 |
| Forge FC | 2022 | Canadian Premier League | 0 | 0 | 0 | 0 | 0 | 0 | 0 | 0 | 0 | 0 |
| Forge FC | Total | | 7 | 0 | 0 | 0 | 0 | 0 | 0 | 0 | 7 | 0 |
| Toronto FC II | 2022 | MLS Next Pro | 0 | 0 | 0 | 0 | — | | — | | 0 | 0 |
| Simcoe County Rovers | 2023 | League1 Ontario | 19 | 0 | 2 | 0 | — | | — | | 21 | 0 |
| Toronto FC II | 2023 | MLS Next Pro | 0 | 0 | — | | — | | — | | 0 | 0 |
| Valour FC | 2023 | League1 Ontario | 0 | 0 | — | | 0 | 0 | — | | 0 | 0 |
| Vaughan Azzurri | 2024 | League1 Ontario Premier | 10 | 0 | — | | — | | 3 | 0 | 13 | 0 |
| Career total | | | 46 | 0 | 2 | 0 | 0 | 0 | 3 | 0 | 51 | 0 |

== Honours ==
Club

Forge FC

- Canadian Premier League: 2020

Simcoe County Rovers

- League1 Ontario: 2023
