= Molham Babouli =

Syrian footballer (born 1993)

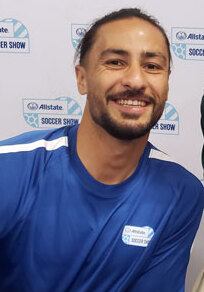
- Babouli in 2024

Personal information
- Date of birth: January 2, 1993 (age 33)
- Place of birth: Al Ain, United Arab Emirates
- Height: 1.73 m (5 ft 8 in)
- Position: Forward

Team information
- Current team: Forge FC
- Number: 18

Youth career
- Mississauga SC
- 2006-?: Dixie SC
- 2014: Toronto FC

College career
Years	Team	Apps	(Gls)
2011–2012	GPC Jaguars		
2013–2014	Sheridan Bruins		

Senior career*
Years	Team	Apps	(Gls)
2014	Toronto FC III	16	(21)
2015	Toronto FC II	20	(4)
2016–2017	Toronto FC	16	(0)
2016	→ Toronto FC II (loan)	6	(0)
2017	Sigma FC	6	(5)
2017–2018	Al-Ittihad	25	(7)
2018–2019	Mississauga MetroStars (indoor)	22	(21)
2019	FC Ukraine United	4	(9)
2020–2021	Forge FC	30	(8)
2022	Muaither		
2022–2024	York United	48	(16)
2025–	Forge FC	38	(4)

International career^{‡}
2015–2016	Canada U23	6	(2)
2022–	Syria	3	(0)
- * Club domestic league appearances and goals as of October 25, 2026 ‡ National team caps and goals as of 28 March 2023

Molham "Mo" Babouli (Arabic: مُلهَم بَابُولِيّ; born January 2, 1993) is a professional footballer who plays as a forward for Forge FC. Born in the United Arab Emirates, he represented Canada at youth international level and currently plays for the Syria national team.

== Early life ==
Babouli was born on 2 January 1993 in Al Ain, United Arab Emirates. He moved with his family to Canada at the age of three.

== Club career ==
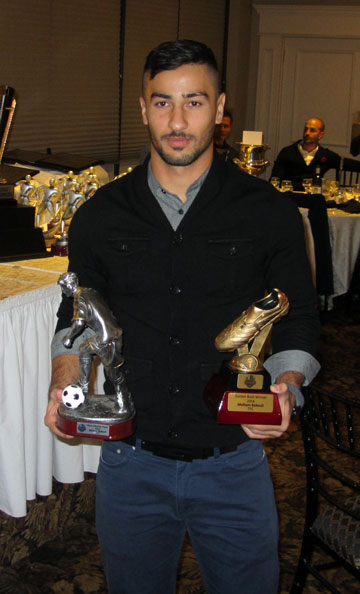
Babouli in 2014 with L1O Golden Boot and MVP awards

=== Toronto FC ===
Babouli spent time at Sheridan College before joining the TFC Academy in 2014. He played with the senior academy side in the inaugural season of League1 Ontario, where he led the league in scoring with 27 goals in all competitions. TFC Academy would go on to win the regular season title and the Inter-Provincial Cup championship against CS Longueuil, the champions of the Première ligue de soccer du Québec. He won the Golden Boot and League MVP honours for the 2014 season.

On March 12, 2015, Babouli signed his first professional contract with Toronto FC II ahead of their inaugural season in the USL. He made his professional debut against the Charleston Battery on March 21, and scored his first goal for the club in the same match. His performance in the match was rewarded with a USL team of the week appearance on March 24.

On March 5, 2016, Babouli signed with Toronto FC. He played alongside Italy international Sebastian Giovinco while playing for the club. He made his MLS debut against Sporting Kansas City on March 20, as a substitute for Tsubasa Endoh. He returned to Toronto FC II on loan ahead of the 2016 USL season. On April 21, 2017, the club announced that Babouli had been placed on waivers.

=== Sigma FC ===
Babouli signed with Sigma following his release from TFC. He scored a goal in his debut against Aurora on July 8, 2017.

=== Al-Ittihad ===
In September 2017, Babouli joined Syrian club Al-Ittihad of the Syrian Premier League. They finished in second place in the 2017–18 season, after losing a tie-breaker to Al-Jaish with whom they were level on points.

=== Mississauga MetroStars ===
Babouli signed for MASL club Mississauga MetroStars ahead of their inaugural season on November 2, 2018. In his debut season in the MASL he was named the Newcomer of the Year. Babouli was announced as the MetroStars' new team captain ahead of the 2019–20 MASL season.

=== FC Ukraine United ===
Babouli played in the Canadian Soccer League for the 2019 season with FC Ukraine United. In his debut match on September 8, 2019 he recorded four goals against Brantford Galaxy. He recorded his second hat-trick on October 1, 2019 against SC Real Mississauga. As a result finished as the club's top goalscorer with nine goals and the league's fourth leading goalscorer, despite only playing four games – Mykola Temniuk led the league with 18 goals in 17 games.

In the opening match of the postseason Babouli scored against Hamilton City SC, and advanced to the next round after a penalty shootout. In the semifinal he contributed another goal in a 5–3 victory against SC Waterloo Region, and advanced to the CSL Championship. He featured in the finals against Scarborough SC, but in a losing effort. In early 2020, he trailed with Canadian Premier League club York United FC.

=== Forge FC ===
On August 4, 2020, Canadian Premier League club Forge FC announced the signing of Babouli to a contract. He made his debut for the club as a substitute on August 13 in the 2020 season opener against Cavalry FC. On September 19, Forge defeated HFX Wanderers FC in the 2020 CPL Final to win the league title. Babouli assisted on the game's winning goal and was named Man of the match. Babouli re-signed with Forge for the 2021 Canadian Premier League season. By winning the 2020 season, Forge qualified for the 2021 CONCACAF League. In the preliminary round, Forge faced C.D. FAS, and Babouli scored the winning goal in the first leg that Forge would win 3–1. A 2–2 draw in the second leg meant Forge would advance. In the next round, Forge faced Panamanian club Independiente. After a scoreless first leg, Babouli would again send Forge through to the next round by opening the scoring in a 2–0 victory. In the quarter-finals against Costa Rican club Santos de Guápiles, Forge lost the first leg away 3–1, but Babouli played the hero in the second leg, first assisting Omar Browne's goal, and then scoring himself to give Forge the lead on away goals, though Joshua Navarro would later seal the game for Forge by making it 3–0. This victory sent Forge into the semi-finals and also qualified them for the 2022 CONCACAF Champions League, becoming the first ever Canadian Premier league club to do so. Babouli scored 3 goals and contributed 2 assists in the tournament and was honoured in the Team of the Tournament.

=== Muaither SC ===
In 2022, Babouli joined Muaither SC in the Qatari Second Division.

=== York United ===
In August 2022, Babouli joined York United FC on a contract through the 2024 season. He made his debut for his new club on August 14, entering in as a substitute against FC Edmonton. In York's next game on August 20, Babouli scored his first goal against his former club Forge FC in an eventual 3-1 victory. In 2023, Babouli was subject to controversy due to not showing up to York United’s pride match.

=== Second spell at Forge FC ===
On January 23, 2025, Babouli signed a one-year contract with Forge FC.

== International career ==
Babouli was eligible to represent the United Arab Emirates (through birth), Syria (through descent), and Canada (through residency). Babouli made his debut for the Canadian program with the U23 side at the 2015 Pan American Games. He played his first match against Brazil U23 and scored a goal in a 4–1 defeat. Babouli was named to the 2015 CONCACAF Men's Olympic Qualifying Championship team on September 18, 2015.

In November 2021, he was named to Syria's preliminary squad for the 2021 FIFA Arab Cup. He made his debut for the team against the country of his birth, United Arab Emirates, in a 2022 FIFA World Cup qualifier on January 27, 2022.

== Style of play ==
Babouli plays as a forward. He played as a midfielder while playing for Canadian side York United FC.

== Personal life ==
In April 2018, Babouli was detained by the Syrian Military Police upon obtaining the Syrian Identity Card, due to the fact that each Syrian male has to do the mandatory military service. He was released days later after paying the fee required for the exemption of the military duties.

== Career statistics ==
=== Club ===
As of match played November 3, 2025

Appearances and goals by club, season and competition
Club	Season	League			Playoffs (Note: Includes MLS Cup playoffs, Canadian Premier League Finals and Canadian Soccer League playoffs)		League cup		National cup (Note: Includes Canadian Championship)		Continental		Total	
Club	Season	Division	Apps	Goals	Apps	Goals	Apps	Goals	Apps	Goals	Apps	Goals	Apps	Goals
Toronto FC III	2014	League1 Ontario	16	21	—		—		6	6	—		22	27
Toronto FC II	2015	United Soccer League	20	4	—		—		—		—		20	4
Toronto FC	2016	Major League Soccer	16	0	0	0	4	0	—		—		20	0
Toronto FC II (loan)	2016	United Soccer League	6	0	—		—		—		—		6	0
Sigma FC	2017	League1 Ontario	7	5	—		—		0	0	—		7	5
Al-Ittihad	2017–18	Syrian Premier League	25	7	—		3	1	—		—		28	8
FC Ukraine United	2019	Canadian Soccer League	4	9	3	2	—		—		—		7	11
Forge FC	2020	Canadian Premier League	10	1	1	0	0	0	—		4	1	15	2
Forge FC	2021	Canadian Premier League	21	7	1	0	1	0	—		6	3	29	10
Forge FC	Total		31	8	2	0	1	0	—		10	4	44	12
York United FC	2022	Canadian Premier League	8	5	—		0	0	—		—		8	5
York United FC	2023	Canadian Premier League	19	6	1	0	1	1	—		—		21	7
York United FC	2024	Canadian Premier League	21	5	2	2	1	0	—		—		24	7
York United FC	Total		48	16	3	2	2	1	—		—		53	19
Forge FC	2025	Canadian Premier League	24	4	2	0	—		5	2	2	0	33	6
Career total			197	74	10	4	10	2	11	8	12	4	240	92

=== International ===
As of match played March 28, 2023

Appearances and goals by national team and year
National team	Year	Apps	Goals
Syria	2022	2	0
Syria	2023	1	0
Total		3	0

== Honours ==
Sheridan College

- CCAA National Championship: 2014

Toronto FC III

- League1 Ontario League Champions: 2014
- L1O/PLSQ Inter-Provincial Cup Champions: 2014

Toronto FC

- Canadian Championship: 2016
- Trillium Cup: 2016

Forge

- Canadian Premier League: 2020

Individual

- League1 Ontario Golden Boot: 2014
- League1 Ontario MVP: 2014
- Major Arena Soccer League Newcomer of the Year: 2018–19
- CONCACAF League Team Of The Tournament: 2021
