= Johnny Son =

Canadian soccer player (born 2003)

Personal information
- Full name: Jonghyun Son
- Date of birth: May 30, 2003 (age 23)
- Place of birth: Oakville, Ontario, Canada
- Height: 1.80 m (5 ft 11 in)
- Position: Midfielder

Team information
- Current team: Waterloo United
- Number: 17

Youth career
- Sigma FC

Senior career*
Years	Team	Apps	(Gls)
2019	Sigma FC	2	(0)
2021	Forge FC	6	(0)
2025–	Waterloo United	14	(1)
- * Club domestic league appearances and goals as of August 1, 2025

Jonghyun "Johnny" Son (born May 30, 2003) is a Canadian soccer player who plays for Waterloo United in League1 Ontario.

== Early life ==
Son began playing with Sigma FC at youth level at age 11.

== Club career ==
In 2019, Son played for League1 Ontario club Sigma FC, making two appearances during the regular season, and two in the playoffs.

After training with the team in the summer of 2019, in June 2021 Forge FC announced Son was joining the club on a multi-year contract. He made his debut for Forge in a 2021 CONCACAF League match against Salvadoran side FAS on August 12.

== Career statistics ==
As of match played November 13, 2021

Appearances and goals by club, season and competition
Club	Season	League			Playoffs		National cup		Continental		Total	
Club	Season	Division	Apps	Goals	Apps	Goals	Apps	Goals	Apps	Goals	Apps	Goals
Sigma FC	2019	League1 Ontario	2	0	2	0	—		—		4	0
Forge FC	2021	Canadian Premier League	6	0	0	0	0	0	1	0	7	0
Career total			8	0	2	0	0	0	1	0	11	0
