= Santiago Frias =

Canadian soccer player (born 2003)

Personal information
- Date of birth: June 20, 2003 (age 23)
- Place of birth: Oakville, Ontario, Canada
- Height: 1.93 m (6 ft 4 in)
- Position: Defender

Youth career
- Sigma FC

College career
Years	Team	Apps	(Gls)
2021–2022	Akron Zips	9	(1)
2021–2022	Albany Great Danes	17	(1)

Senior career*
Years	Team	Apps	(Gls)
2021	Forge FC	2	(0)
2021	→ Sigma FC (loan)	1	(0)
2022–2024	Sigma FC	26	(0)
2024	→ Sigma FC B	1	(0)
- * Club domestic league appearances and goals as of July 7, 2024

Santiago Frias (born June 20, 2003) is a Canadian soccer player.

== College career ==
In August 2021, Frias began attending the University of Akron and was unveiled by the Akron Zips as part of their newcomer class. He made his debut on August 26, 2021 against the Wright State Raiders. He scored his first goal on September 2, 2022, also against Wright State.

In 2023, he transferred to the University at Albany, SUNY, where he joined the men's soccer team. He made his debut on August 24 against the Boston University Terriers. On September 9, 2023, he scored his first goal for Albany in a 2-1 victory over the Marist Red Foxes. At the end of his first year, he was named to the America East Conference Academy Honor Roll.

== Club career ==
On June 24, 2021, Canadian Premier League club Forge FC announced that they had signed Frias to a developmental contract. He made his professional debut on July 22 against Cavalry FC. He played one match with Forge's affiliate team, Sigma FC in League1 Ontario in 2021. At the end of the season, he departed Forge.

For the 2022 season, he played with Sigma FC.

== Career statistics ==
As of match played July 7, 2024

Club	Season	League			Playoffs		National Cup		Other		Total	
Club	Season	Division	Apps	Goals	Apps	Goals	Apps	Goals	Apps	Goals	Apps	Goals
Forge FC	2021	Canadian Premier League	2	0	0	0	0	0	0	0	2	0
Sigma FC (loan)	2021	League1 Ontario	1	0	—		—		—		1	0
Sigma FC	2022	League1 Ontario	12	0	—		—		—		12	0
Sigma FC	2023	League1 Ontario	7	0	—		—		—		7	0
Sigma FC	2024	League1 Ontario Premier	7	0	—		—		1	0	8	0
Sigma FC	Total		26	0	0	0	0	0	1	0	27	0
Sigma FC B	2024	League2 Ontario	1	0	0	0	—		—		1	0
Career total			30	0	0	0	0	0	1	0	31	0
