= Sebastian Castello (soccer) =

Canadian soccer player (born 2003)

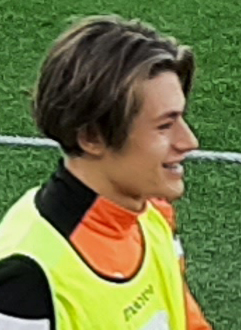
- Castello in 2021

Personal information
- Date of birth: October 8, 2003 (age 23)
- Place of birth: Mississauga, Ontario, Canada
- Height: 1.73 m (5 ft 8 in)
- Position: Midfielder

Youth career
- RVDL Soccer Academy
- Sigma FC

Senior career*
| Years | Team | Apps | (Gls) |
| 2021–2024 | Forge FC | 16 | (1) |
| 2021 | → Sigma FC (loan) | 11 | (1) |
| 2025– | Sigma FC | 17 | (8) |
- * Club domestic league appearances and goals as of August 29, 2025

Sebastian Castello (born October 8, 2003) is a Canadian soccer player who plays for Sigma FC in League1 Ontario.

== Early life ==
Castello began his career with the RVDL Lions, created by former Dutch player Robin van der Laan, before later joining Sigma FC.

== Club career ==
On July 30, 2021 Forge FC announced the signing of Castello to a developmental deal. That same day he made his professional debut for Forge against York United, entering as a substitute for Tristan Borges in an eventual 1–0 victory. In addition to his contract with Forge he also suited up for their League1 Ontario affiliate, Sigma FC, and made his debut in their opening weekend victory over ProStars FC on July 31, netting a goal in a 3–1 victory. On October 30, Castello scored his first goal for Forge, scoring the final goal in a 4–1 victory over the HFX Wanderers. In February 2022, Forge announced they had re-signed Castello ahead of the upcoming season. In October 2023, he helped Forge win their fourth league title, following a 2–1 win over Cavalry FC in the play-off final.

In 2025, he played with Sigma FC in League1 Ontario. That season, he was named a league First Team All-Star.

== International career ==
In December 2022, Castello received a call to join a camp with the Canada national futsal team.

== Career statistics ==
As of October 19, 2024

Appearances and goals by club, season and competition
| Club | Season | League | | | Playoffs | | Domestic Cup | | Other | | Total | |
| Club | Season | Division | Apps | Goals | Apps | Goals | Apps | Goals | Apps | Goals | Apps | Goals |
|---|---|---|---|---|---|---|---|---|---|---|---|---|
| Forge FC | 2021 | Canadian Premier League | 6 | 1 | 0 | 0 | 0 | 0 | 0 | 0 | 6 | 1 |
| Forge FC | 2022 | Canadian Premier League | 6 | 0 | 0 | 0 | 1 | 0 | 0 | 0 | 7 | 0 |
| Forge FC | 2023 | Canadian Premier League | 2 | 0 | 0 | 0 | 0 | 0 | — | | 2 | 0 |
| Forge FC | 2024 | Canadian Premier League | 2 | 0 | 0 | 0 | 0 | 0 | 0 | 0 | 2 | 0 |
| Forge FC | Total | | 16 | 1 | 0 | 0 | 1 | 0 | 0 | 0 | 17 | 1 |
| Sigma FC (loan) | 2021 | League1 Ontario | 11 | 1 | — | | — | | — | | 11 | 1 |
| Sigma FC | 2025 | League1 Ontario Premier | 17 | 8 | — | | — | | 1 | 1 | 18 | 9 |
| Career total | | | 44 | 10 | 0 | 0 | 1 | 0 | 1 | 1 | 46 | 11 |
