= Alexander Achinioti-Jönsson =

Swedish footballer (born 1996)

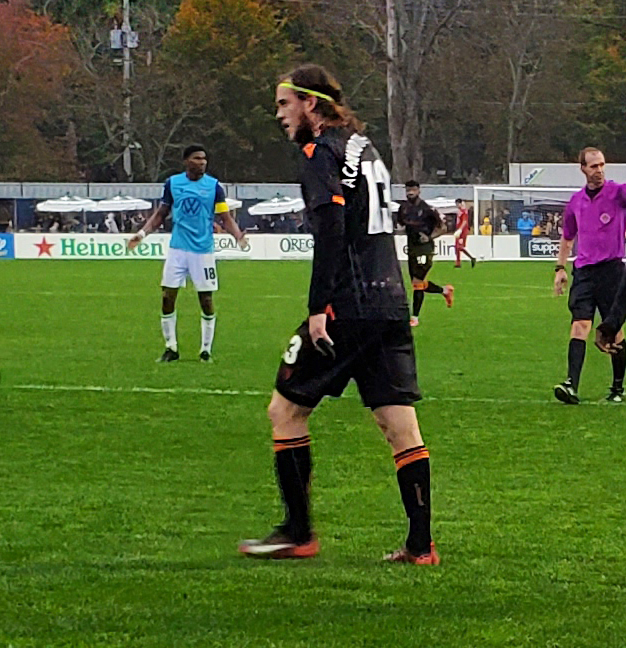
- Achinioti-Jönsson with Forge FC in 2021

Personal information
- Full name: Alexander Börje Achinioti-Jönsson
- Date of birth: 17 April 1996 (age 30)
- Place of birth: Hittarp, Sweden
- Height: 1.88 m (6 ft 2 in)
- Positions: Midfielder; centre-back

Team information
- Current team: Raufoss IL
- Number: 13

Youth career
- 2000–2011: Hittarps IK
- 2012–2013: Helsingborgs IF

Senior career*
Years	Team	Apps	(Gls)
2011–2012	Hittarps IK	5	(1)
2014–2017	Helsingborgs IF	37	(0)
2017	→ Ängelholms FF (loan)	3	(0)
2018	IFK Värnamo	27	(4)
2019–2025	Forge FC	168	(6)
2026–	Raufoss IL	19	(2)

International career
2014	Sweden U19	2	(0)
- * Club domestic league appearances and goals as of 28 September 2026

Alexander Börje Achinioti-Jönsson (born 17 April 1996) is a Swedish footballer who plays as a midfielder and centerback for the Norwegian 1. divisjon club Raufoss IL.

== Club career ==
=== Helsingborgs IF ===
On 1 May 2014, Achinioti-Jönsson made his professional debut for Helsingborgs IF as an injury-time substitute in a Swedish Cup match against Malmö FF. Four days later on 5 May, he made his league debut as a 27th-minute substitute against AIK.

In 2015, during a U21 match against IFK Göteborg, Achinioti-Jönsson was hospitalized due to a high heart rate. Shortly after being released from hospital, he suffered a concussion which kept him sidelined for two months. After returning to training, he had another heart episode during a workout which sent him to the hospital once again. On this occasion, he was not cleared to return to training until the end of the season, when doctors finally determined that his heartrate issues were benign. As a result of these health issues, Achinioti-Jönsson missed out on a large amount of training and was only able to make one first-team appearance all season.

In 2016, Achinioti-Jönsson made 14 league appearances for Helsingborg, including five starts.

In 2017, after Helsingborg was relegated, Achinioti-Jönsson made 15 league appearances, including 12 starts.

==== Loan to Ängelholms FF ====
In August 2017, Achinioti-Jönsson was loaned to Division 1 side Ängelholms FF.

=== IFK Värnamo ===
On 30 January 2018, Achinioti-Jönsson signed with Superettan club IFK Värnamo. He made 27 league appearances for Värnamo that season, scoring four goals.

=== Forge FC ===
On 31 January 2019, Achinioti-Jönsson signed with Canadian Premier League club Forge FC. He made his debut for Forge on 27 April 2019, in the Canadian Premier League inaugural match, a 1–1 draw against York9 FC. He ended up making 27 out of a possible 28 appearances for Forge in the club's inaugural season and helped the team become the first-ever league champions, as Forge defeated Cavalry FC over two legs in the 2019 Canadian Premier League Finals. He was regarded to have established himself as a regular starter while playing for them.

Achinioti-Jönsson scored the winning goal in the 2020 Canadian Premier League Final when Forge defeated HFX Wanderers FC 2–0 to win their second consecutive league title. In his third season with Forge in 2021, he recorded the second-best passing accuracy in the league and was named in the Team of the Week four times, as both a defender and a midfielder. In January 2022, he was re-signed to a multi-year deal.

In 2022, Achinioti-Jönsson played the majority of the season at the centre-back position due to injuries on the team. The change of position was successful as he nominated for CPL Player of the Year award and was the winner of the league's Defender of the Year award. On 31 July, the defender played in his 100th game for Forge FC across all competitions. At the following home match, he was presented with a commemorative jersey with his last name and the kit number 100. In October 2023, he helped Forge win their fourth league title, following a 2–1 win over Cavalry FC in the play-off final. In January 2024, he signed another multi-year extension with the club. After the 2025 season, he departed the club.

=== Raufoss ===
In February 2026, he joined Norwegian 1. divisjon club Raufoss IL on a one-and-a-half year contract.

== International career ==
Achinioti-Jönsson has represented Sweden internationally at the U19 level.

== Personal life ==
Achinioti-Jönsson was born on 17 April 1996. Born in Hittarp, Sweden, he is a native of Helsingborg Municipality, Sweden. He has been married.

== Career statistics ==
As of 8 July 2026

Club	Season	League			Playoffs		National Cup (Note: Includes appearances in the Svenska Cupen and the Canadian Championship)		Continental (Note: Includes appearances in CONCACAF League and the CONCACAF Champions Cup)		Other		Total	
Club	Season	Division	Apps	Goals	Apps	Goals	Apps	Goals	Apps	Goals	Apps	Goals	Apps	Goals
Helsingborgs IF	2014	Allsvenskan	7	0	—		2	0	—		—		9	0
Helsingborgs IF	2015	Allsvenskan	1	0	—		1	0	—		—		2	0
Helsingborgs IF	2016	Allsvenskan	14	0	2	0	3	0	—		—		19	0
Helsingborgs IF	2017	Superettan	15	0	—		4	0	—		—		19	0
Helsingborgs IF	Total		37	0	2	0	10	0	0	0	0	0	49	0
Ängelholms FF (loan)	2017	Swedish Division 1	3	0	—		0	0	—		—		3	0
IFK Värnamo	2018	Superettan	27	4	2	1	3	1	—		—		32	6
Forge FC	2019	Canadian Premier League	23	0	2	0	2	0	2	0	—		29	0
Forge FC	2020	Canadian Premier League	10	2	1	1	1	0	4	0	—		16	3
Forge FC	2021	Canadian Premier League	25	1	2	0	2	0	7	0	—		36	1
Forge FC	2022	Canadian Premier League	27	1	3	0	2	0	2	0	—		34	1
Forge FC	2023	Canadian Premier League	27	0	2	0	3	0	—		—		32	0
Forge FC	2024	Canadian Premier League	28	1	3	1	5	0	2	0	—		38	2
Forge FC	2025	Canadian Premier League	28	1	2	0	5	0	2	0	—		37	1
Forge FC	Total		168	6	15	2	20	0	19	0	0	0	222	8
Raufoss IL	2026	Norwegian First Division	14	2	—		0	0	—		—		14	2
Career totals			249	12	19	3	33	1	19	0	0	0	320	16

== Honours ==
Forge FC

- Canadian Premier League: 2019, 2020, 2022, 2023

Individual

- Canadian Premier League Defender of the Year: 2022
