= Paolo Sabak =

Belgian footballer

Personal information
- Full name: Paolo Sabak
- Date of birth: 10 February 1999 (age 27)
- Place of birth: Mechelen, Belgium
- Height: 1.76 m (5 ft 9 in)
- Position: Attacking midfielder

Team information
- Current team: RVC Hoboken

Youth career
- –2016: Genk

Senior career*
| Years | Team | Apps | (Gls) |
| 2016–2018 | Genk | 1 | (0) |
| 2018–2020 | NEC | 9 | (1) |
| 2020–2021 | Forge FC | 34 | (3) |
| 2022–2023 | K.S.C. Lokeren-Temse | | |
| 2023 | K.F.C. Diest | | |
| 2023– | RVC Hoboken | | |

International career
| 2014 | Belgium U15 | 7 | (0) |
| 2014–2015 | Belgium U16 | 6 | (0) |
| 2015 | Belgium U17 | 2 | (0) |
| 2016–2017 | Belgium U18 | 4 | (0) |
| 2016 | Belgium U19 | 1 | (0) |
- * Club domestic league appearances and goals as of 14 November 2022

Paolo Sabak (born 10 February 1999) is a Belgian professional footballer who plays as an attacking midfielder for RVC Hoboken.

== Club career ==
=== Genk ===
Sabak is a youth product of K.R.C. Genk. He made his Belgian Pro League debut at 21 August 2016 in a 0–3 away win against Sporting Lokeren. He replaced Alejandro Pozuelo after 80 minutes.

=== Forge FC ===
On 23 April 2020, Sabak signed for Canadian Premier League side Forge FC. He made his debut on August 13 in the 2020 season opener against Cavalry FC. He scored his first goal for Forge in his third match, scoring a penalty against HFX Wanderers on August 19.

=== K.S.C. Lokeren-Temse ===
In 2022, Sabak signed for Belgian Division 2 side K.S.C. Lokeren-Temse on a one-year contract with an option.

=== K.F.C. Diest ===
In February 2023, Sabak signed with K.F.C. Diest.

=== RVC Hoboken ===
Later in 2023, Sabak joined RVC Hoboken.

== Personal life ==
Sabak was born in Belgium, and is of Assyrian descent.

== Career statistics ==
As of match played 28 August 2022

Appearances and goals by club, season and competition
| Club | Season | League | | | National Cup | | Continental | | Other | | Total | |
| Club | Season | Division | Apps | Goals | Apps | Goals | Apps | Goals | Apps | Goals | Apps | Goals |
|---|---|---|---|---|---|---|---|---|---|---|---|---|
| Genk | 2016–17 | Belgian First Division A | 1 | 0 | 0 | 0 | 1 (Note: Appearance in the UEFA Europa League.) | 0 | 2 (Note: Appearances in the UEFA Europa League playoff.) | 0 | 4 | 0 |
| Genk | 2017–18 | Belgian First Division A | 0 | 0 | 0 | 0 | 0 | 0 | 0 | 0 | 0 | 0 |
| Genk | Total | | 1 | 0 | 0 | 0 | 1 | 0 | 2 | 0 | 4 | 0 |
| NEC Nijmegen | 2018–19 | Eerste Divisie | 9 | 1 | 1 | 0 | — | | 0 | 0 | 10 | 1 |
| NEC Nijmegen | 2019–20 | Eerste Divisie | 0 | 0 | 0 | 0 | — | | — | | 0 | 0 |
| NEC Nijmegen | Total | | 9 | 1 | 1 | 0 | — | | 0 | 0 | 10 | 1 |
| Forge FC | 2020 | Canadian Premier League | 11 | 2 | 0 | 0 | 4 (Note: Appearances in the CONCACAF League.) | 0 | — | | 15 | 2 |
| Forge FC | 2021 | Canadian Premier League | 23 | 1 | 1 | 0 | 5 | 0 | — | | 29 | 1 |
| Forge FC | Total | | 34 | 3 | 1 | 0 | 9 | 0 | — | | 44 | 3 |
| K.S.C. Lokeren-Temse | 2022–23 | Belgian Division 2 | 0 | 0 | 0 | 0 | — | | — | | 0 | 0 |
| K.S.C. Lokeren-Temse | Total | | 0 | 0 | 0 | 0 | 0 | 0 | — | | 0 | 0 |
| Career Total | | | 44 | 4 | 2 | 0 | 10 | 0 | 2 | 0 | 58 | 4 |
