= Chris Nanco =

Canadian soccer player (born 1995)

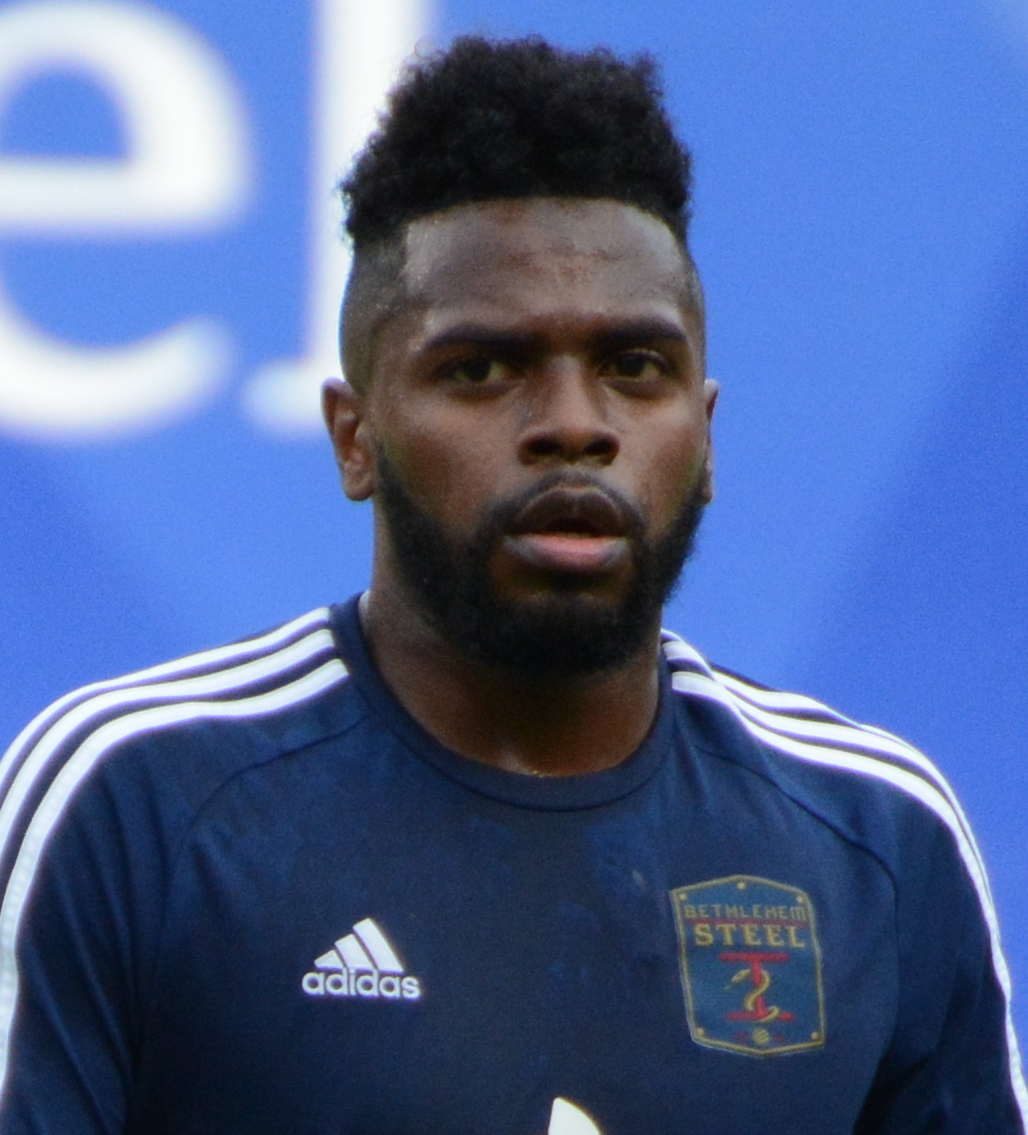
- Nanco with Bethlehem Steel in 2017

Personal information
- Full name: Christopher Lenroy Nanco
- Date of birth: February 15, 1995 (age 31)
- Place of birth: North York, Ontario, Canada
- Height: 1.68 m (5 ft 6 in)
- Position: Forward

Youth career
- Brampton Youth SC
- Sigma FC

College career
Years	Team	Apps	(Gls)
2013–2016	Syracuse Orange	84	(21)

Senior career*
Years	Team	Apps	(Gls)
2014–2016	Sigma FC	9+	(1+)
2017–2018	Bethlehem Steel	60	(9)
2019–2022	Forge FC	55	(8)
2023	Des Moines Menace	6	(0)
2023	Sporting Kristina B	3	(5)
2023	Sporting Kristina	6	(3)
Total		136+	(26+)

International career^{‡}
2011	Canada U17	7	(2)
2015	Canada U20	2	(0)
- * Club domestic league appearances and goals as of March 25, 2024 ‡ National team caps and goals as of April 16, 2017

Christopher Lenroy Nanco (born February 15, 1995) is a Canadian former professional soccer player. He played as a forward.

== Early life ==
He began playing youth soccer with Brampton Youth SC. At age 12, he joined Sigma FC. While with Sigma, he had an opportunity to trial with the Liverpool Academy in England in 2010.

== College career ==
In June 2013, Nanco committed to Syracuse University, where he played for the men's soccer team. He made his debut on August 30 against the Colgate Raiders. He scored his first two goals for Syracuse on September 9, 2013, against the Manhattan Jaspers. As a sophomore, he scored five goals and added two assists, finishing as the team's second leading scorer. During his junior season, he began playing as a central forward, also playing a midfield role at times, transitioning from a primarily winger role in earlier seasons. He finished his junior season with four goals. On September 1, 2016, he had his second career two-goal game, leading Syracuse to a 3–0 victory over Colgate. As a senior, he led the team in scoring with seven goals and at the end of his senior season, he was named an All-ACC First Team All-Star and to the All-South Region third team. Through his time at Syracuse, the team had a perfect 16–0 record in games he scored. He was invited to the MLS Player Combine, ahead of the 2017 MLS SuperDraft.

== Club career ==
From 2014 to 2016, Nanco played in League1 Ontario with Sigma FC, during the college off-seasons. In 2016, he was named to the League1 Ontario All-Star Game roster for the West Division.

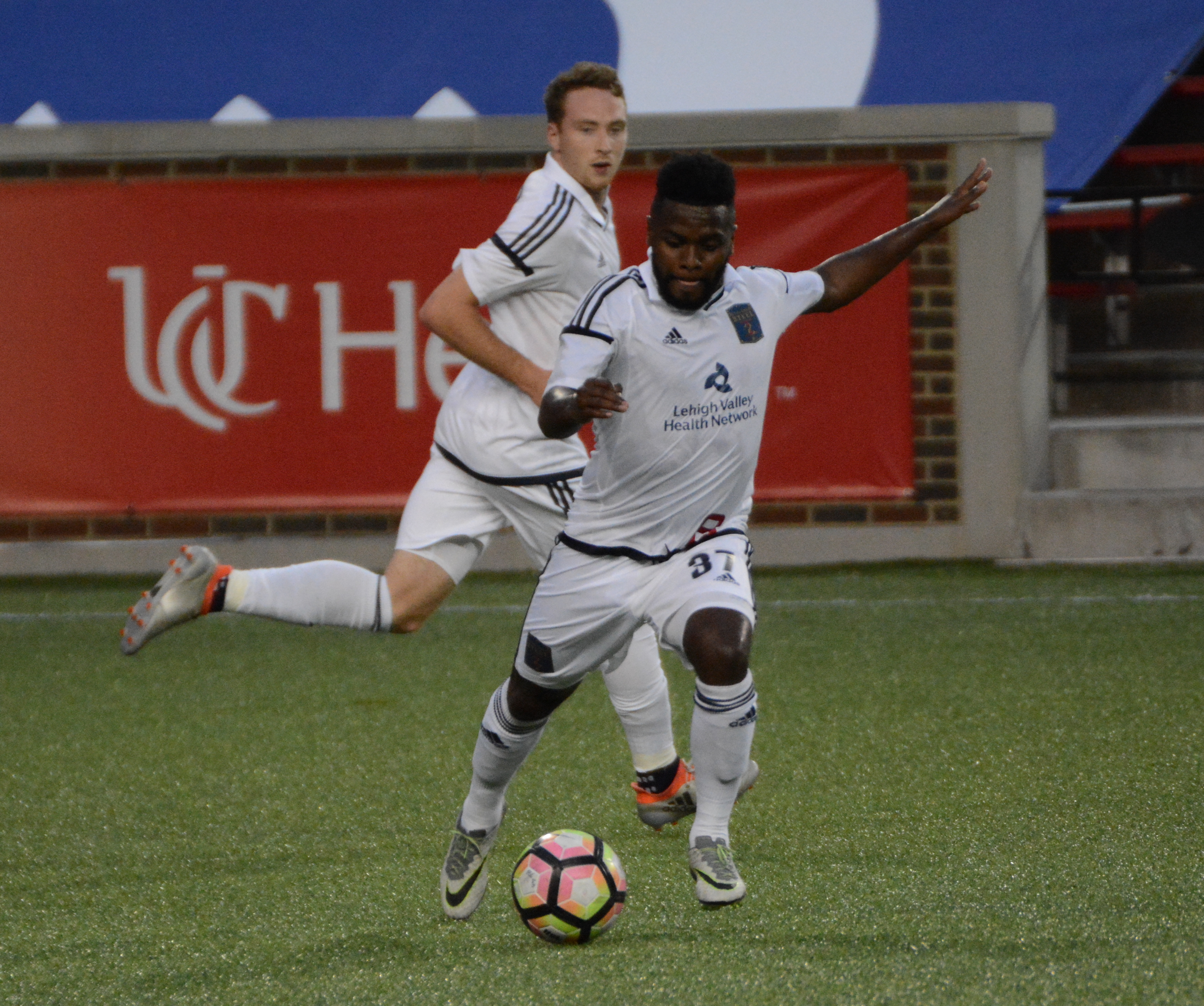
Nanco playing with Bethlehem Steel in 2017

In January 2017, Nanco was selected 55th overall in the 2017 MLS SuperDraft by Philadelphia Union. In March 2017, he signed a professional contract with the Union's USL side, Bethlehem Steel. He scored his first professional goal in his professional debut on April 15, 2017, against the Harrisburg City Islanders. After the 2018 season, he departed the club.

In November 2018, Nanco joined Forge FC for the inaugural season of the Canadian Premier League in 2019, being one of the team's first two ever signings. Nanco helped Forge win the CPL championship in their first season. On August 22, 2019, he scored to lead Forge to a 1–0 victory in the first leg of the CONCACAF League Round of 16 over Honduran club Olimpia. In 2020, Nanco missed half of the season with a hamstring injury, as Forge once again won the league title. In February 2021, he re-signed with the club for the 2021 season.

In 2023, he played with the Des Moines Menace in USL League Two.

Later in 2023, he joined Finnish club Sporting Kristina, playing with the first team in the fourth tier Kolmonen and the second team in the fifth tier Nelonen.

In March 2024, he announced his retirement.

== International career ==
In January 2011, he debuted in the Canadian national program, attending a camp with the Canada U17 team. He won a silver medal with them at the 2011 CONCACAF U-17 Championship, scoring the winning goal in a 2–0 victory over Trinidad and Tobago U17 on February 23, 2011, to qualify Canada for the 2011 FIFA U-17 World Cup, where he also played.

In August 2014, he was named to the Canada U20 for the Dale Farm Milk Cup and was also named to the team for the 2015 CONCACAF U-20 Championship.

== Career statistics ==
As of matches played on December 31, 2023

Club	Season	League			Playoffs		National Cup		Continental		Total	
Club	Season	Division	Apps	Goals	Apps	Goals	Apps	Goals	Apps	Goals	Apps	Goals
Sigma FC	2016	League1 Ontario	9	1	—		—		—		9	1
Bethlehem Steel	2017	USL	27	4	1	0	—		—		28	4
Bethlehem Steel	2018	USL	30	5	2	0	—		—		32	5
Bethlehem Steel	Total		57	9	3	0	0	0	0	0	60	9
Forge FC	2019	Canadian Premier League	24	4	2	0	1	0	2	1	29	5
Forge FC	2020	Canadian Premier League	5	2	0	0	—		2	0	7	2
Forge FC	2021	Canadian Premier League	18	2	1	0	0	0	5	0	24	2
Forge FC	2022	Canadian Premier League	8	0	0	0	1	0	2	0	11	0
Forge FC	Total		55	8	3	0	2	0	11	1	35	7
Des Moines Menace	2023	USL League Two	6	0	?	?	1	0	—		7+	0
Sporting Kristina B	2023	Nelonen	3	5	—		—		—		3	5
Sporting Kristina	2023	Kolmonen	6	3	—		0	0	—		6	3
Career Total			136	26	6	0	3	0	11	1	156	27

== Honours ==
Forge FC

- Canadian Premier League: 2019, 2020, 2022
