= Jonathan Grant =

Guyanese footballer (born 1993)

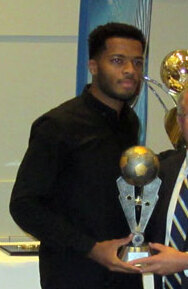
- Grant receives 2017 L1O Defender of the Year award

Personal information
- Full name: Jonathan Nicholas Grant
- Date of birth: October 15, 1993 (age 33)
- Place of birth: Pickering, Ontario, Canada
- Height: 1.89 m (6 ft 2 in)
- Position: Defender

Youth career
- –2009: Wexford SC
- 2009–2012: Sigma FC

College career
Years	Team	Apps	(Gls)
2012–2013	Yavapai Roughriders		

Senior career*
Years	Team	Apps	(Gls)
2014	Sigma FC	12	(0)
2015	FC Montreal	10	(0)
2016	Swope Park Rangers	18	(1)
2017	Sigma FC	20	(7)
2018	Nyköpings BIS	0	(0)
2019–2022	Forge FC	41	(1)
2023	York United	15	(0)
2024–2025	Atlético Ottawa	0	(0)

International career^{‡}
2015	Canada U23	6	(0)
2023–	Guyana	6	(0)
- * Club domestic league appearances and goals as of September 9, 2025 ‡ National team caps and goals as of November 21, 2023

Jonathan Nicholas Grant (born October 15, 1993) is a professional footballer who plays as a defender. Born in Canada, Grant plays for the Guyana national team.

== Early life ==
Grant began playing youth soccer at age three with Wexford SC in Scarborough, Ontario. When he was 15, he joined Sigma FC.

In 2012, Grant committed to join Yavapai College.

== Club career ==
In 2014, he played with Sigma FC in League1 Ontario. After the season, he was invited to train with the first team and reserves of Belgian club Genk.

On May 15, 2015, after a month-long trial, he signed a professional contract with USL club FC Montreal, the second team of Major League Soccer club Montreal Impact. He made his debut the same day against the Charleston Battery.

In December 2015, he signed with the Swope Park Rangers for the 2016 season. He scored his first goal for the club in a 3–0 win over Orange County Blues FC on July 23, 2016.

In 2017, he returned to his former club Sigma FC in League1 Ontario. He was named Defender of the Year and a league First-Team All-Star.

In February 2018, Grant signed with Swedish Division 1 Norra club Nyköpings BIS for the 2018 season. However, he suffered an injury in pre-season and would miss the entire 2018 season due to surgery, so he and the club agreed to terminate the contract by mutual consent in June 2018.

In February 2019, he signed with Forge FC of the Canadian Premier League. He scored his first goal on August 25, 2019, against Cavalry FC. Injuries limited his play time over his first two seasons with the club. In February 2021, he extended his contract with the club. After the 2022 season, his option for 2023 was declined by the club.

In March 2023, he signed with fellow CPL side York United for the 2023 season. In August 2023, he suffered a facial fracture after a head-on-head collision with Théo Collomb in a match against the HFX Wanderers, keeping him out for several weeks. After the 2023 season, he departed the club.

In February 2024, he signed with Atlético Ottawa on a two-year contract. He became the first player to have played for all three of the league's Ontario-based clubs. During pre-season, he suffered a knee injury requiring knee surgery, forcing him to miss the entire 2024 season. In September 2025, Grant was removed from the roster following a mutual termination of his contract, but would remain with the club for the rest of the season to rehabilitate his injury from the previous season which kept him out of 2025 as well.

== International career ==
Grant was eligible to play for Canada, where he was born, and Guyana, where his parents are from.

=== Canada ===
Grant received his first call-up to Canada national team on January 9, 2015, for a pair of friendlies against Iceland. However, he did not appear in either of the two matches. In June 2015, he was called up to the Canada U23 for the 2015 Pan Am Games. In September 2015, he was named to the squad for the 2015 CONCACAF Men's Olympic Qualifying Championship.

=== Guyana ===
In 2023, it was revealed that he had begun the process to obtain a Guyanese passport, with the goal of representing the country at senior level. In March 2023, he was called up to the Guyana national team for the first time ahead of their CONCACAF Nations League matches. He proceeded to win his first cap for the Golden Jaguars on 25 March, starting in a 2–0 win over Bermuda, in which he recorded an assist. In June 2023, Grant was named to Guyana's 23-man squad for the 2023 CONCACAF Gold Cup qualification tournament.

== Honours ==
=== Club ===
Forge FC

- Canadian Premier League: 2019, 2020, 2022

=== Individual ===
- League1 Ontario Defender of the Year: 2017
- League1 Ontario First Team All Star: 2017
