= Sigma FC =

Canadian soccer team

- Full name: Sigma Sports
- Founded: 2005
- Stadium: Paramount Fine Foods Centre; Mississauga, Ontario
- Owner: Sigma Sports Solutions
- Managing director: Constantine Smyrniotis
- Head coach: John Zervos
- League: Ontario Premier League
- 2025: L1O-P, 9th
- Website: www.sigmafc.ca
Home colours

Sigma Sports is a Canadian youth soccer development academy and player management company based in Mississauga, Ontario. They also operate a senior academy soccer team that currently competes in the men's division of the Ontario Premier League, as Sigma FC. Over 140 Sigma players have gone on to play NCAA or U Sports soccer on scholarships.

== History ==
Sigma was formed in 2005 by Constantine and Bobby Smyrniotis as a private academy aimed to develop young Canadian soccer players. Over the years Sigma have sent players from their academy to the NCAA and to trials overseas.

When League1 Ontario was formed in early 2014, Sigma announced they would be entering their senior academy team to compete as part of inaugural season. They were one of the three Ontario Soccer Association Recognized Non-Club Academies permitted to enter a team in the league, along with ANB Futbol and Master's FA. The Mississauga-based League1 Ontario teams - Sigma FC and North Mississauga SC (and formerly the now-Brampton-based ProStars FC) - compete annually for the Credit River Cup, awarded by the Sauga City Collective supporters group, with the team's matches against each other during the L1O deciding the victor.

Sigma made news in January 2015 when academy player Cyle Larin was drafted first overall by Major League Soccer club Orlando City at the 2015 MLS SuperDraft. This was the first time a Canadian went first overall in an MLS draft.

On October 1, 2018, Sigma co-founder Bobby Smyrniotis was named head coach and technical director of Canadian Premier League club Forge FC. Bobby had served as technical director and first team head coach of Sigma from 2005 to 2018. 16 members of Forge's 2019 roster had played for Sigma in the past. In 2023, they formalized their affiliation with Canadian Premier League club Forge FC, which enables Forge to send players to Sigma on short-term loans throughout the season.

== Seasons ==
Season	League	Teams	Record	Rank	Playoffs	League Cup	Ref
2014	League1 Ontario	9	8–5–3	3rd	–	Runner-up	
2015	League1 Ontario	12	12–6–4	4th	–	Runner-up	
2016	League1 Ontario	16	14–2–6	2nd, Western (5th overall)	did not qualify	First round	
2017	League1 Ontario	16	17–4–1	2nd, Western (2nd overall)	did not qualify	First round	
2018	League1 Ontario	17	11–4–1	2nd	Group stage	Semifinals	
2019	League1 Ontario	16	8–3–4	5th	Quarterfinals	–	
2020	League1 Ontario	Season cancelled due to COVID-19 pandemic					
2021	League1 Ontario	15	4–3–5	5th, Western (9th overall)	did not qualify	–	
2022	League1 Ontario	22	9–4–8	9th	did not qualify	–	
2023	League1 Ontario	21	9–5–6	9th	did not qualify	–	
2024	League1 Ontario Premier	12	7–4–11	9th	–	Quarterfinals	
2025	League1 Ontario Premier	11	7–3–10	9th	–	Round of 32	

== Notable players ==
The following players have either played at the professional or international level, either before or after playing for the League1 Ontario team:

- (Canada) Ife Adenuga
- (Canada) Kwame Awuah
- (Syria) Molham Babouli
- (Canada) Kyle Bekker
- (Canada) Tristan Borges
- (Canada) Tajon Buchanan
- (Canada) Marcus Caldeira
- (Canada) Sebastian Castello
- (Canada) Klaidi Cela
- (Canada) Robbie Cleary
- (Canada) Nathan Dossantos
- (Canada) Malcolm Duncan
- (Canada) Giuliano Frano
- (Canada) Santiago Frias
- (Canada) Sam Gardner
- (Canada) Mark Gonzalez
- (Canada) Jonathan Grant
- (Canada) Triston Henry
- (Canada) Evan James
- (Canada) Manjrekar James
- (Canada) Noah Jensen
- (Guyana) Daniel Jodah
- (Canada) Christopher Kalongo
- (Canada) Khadim Kane
- (Guyana) Ryan Khedoo
- (Canada) Amadou Koné
- (Canada) Cyle Larin
- (Canada) Richie Laryea
- (Canada) Duran Lee
- (Canada) Baj Maan
- (Canada) Monti Mohsen
- (Canada) Chris Nanco
- (Canada) Oluwaseun Oyegunle
- (Canada) Kwasi Poku
- (Trinidad and Tobago) Greg Ranjitsingh
- (Canada) Dominic Samuel
- (Guyana) Jelani Smith
- (Canada) Johnny Son
- (Canada) Justin Stoddart
- (Canada) Kevaughn Tavernier
- (Canada) Kadell Thomas
- (Canada) David Velastegui
- (Guyana) Emery Welshman
- (Guyana) Daniel Whyte
- (Canada) Lowell Wright
- (Canada) Marcel Zajac
