= Marcel Zajac =

Canadian soccer player (born 1998)

Personal information
- Full name: Marcel Dominik Zajac
- Date of birth: April 29, 1998 (age 28)
- Place of birth: Toronto, Ontario, Canada
- Height: 1.80 m (5 ft 11 in)
- Position: Forward

Team information
- Current team: Guelph United

Youth career
- Erin Mills SC
- Sigma FC

College career
Years	Team	Apps	(Gls)
2016–2018	Akron Zips	54	(18)

Senior career*
Years	Team	Apps	(Gls)
2015–2018	Sigma FC	27+	(15+)
2019–2020	Forge FC	25	(1)
2021	Watra Białka Tatrzańska	11	(8)
2021	Olimpia Elbląg	2	(0)
2022	Guelph United	15	(6)
2023	Vaughan Azzurri	6	(3)
2026–	Guelph United	0	(0)
- * Club domestic league appearances and goals as of 22:32, 6 February 2026 (UTC)

Marcel Dominik Zajac (born April 29, 1998) is a Canadian professional soccer player who plays as a forward for Ontario Premier League club Guelph United FC.

== Early life ==
Zajac was born in Toronto to Polish parents, and later moved to Mississauga at age three. He began playing soccer at age six with local club Erin Mills SC. Afterwards, he joined the Sigma FC academy.

== College career ==
In 2016, Zajac began attending the University of Akron, where he played for the men's soccer team on a scholarship. He scored his first collegiate goal on October 7, 2017 against the Buffalo Bulls. In 2018, he helped Akron win the Mid-American Conference title and was named MAC tournament MVP, as well as finishing as runner-ups for the NCAA National Tournament. He was named a Second Team All-MAC All-Star in 2018. He then spent some time training with Major League Soccer club Columbus Crew. After the season, he departed Akron to turn professional, rather than to return for his senior season.

== Club career ==
While attending the University of Akron, Zajac continued to play with his youth club Sigma FC in the summer in League1 Ontario, beginning in 2015. In 2016, he made 13 league appearances for Sigma, scoring five goals. The following year, Zajac made six appearances and added three goals. In 2018, he scored a career-high seven goals in eight appearances. He scored back-to-back hat-tricks on May 12, 2018 against Windsor TFC and May 19, 2018 against Ottawa South United.

On January 8, 2019, Zajac signed his first professional contract with Canadian Premier League side Forge FC, joining former Sigma FC coach Bobby Smyrniotis. He made his professional debut as a substitute in the inaugural CPL match against York9.

In March 2021, it was reported that Zajac signed with Watra Białka Tatrzańska of the Polish fifth division. In June 2021, he trialled with Polish club OKS Stomil Olsztyn.

In July 2021, Zajac signed with II liga side Olimpia Elbląg. He left the club by mutual consent on November 30, 2021.

In 2022, he played with Guelph United F.C. in League1 Ontario.

== International career ==
In 2014, he was called up to a camp with the Canada U17 team, and later attended a camp with the Canada U20 team.

== Personal life ==
Zajac's father, Czesław, was also a professional soccer player, who played professionally in Poland and Canada.

== Honours ==
Forge FC

- Canadian Premier League: 2019, 2020
