= Triston Henry =

Canadian soccer player (born 1993)

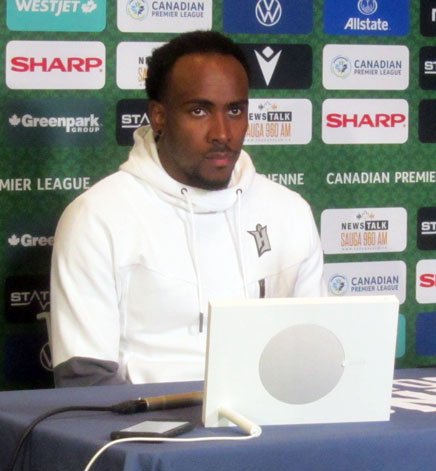
- Henry with Forge FC in 2022

Personal information
- Full name: Triston Javon Henry
- Date of birth: September 8, 1993 (age 33)
- Place of birth: Scarborough, Ontario, Canada
- Height: 1.83 m (6 ft 0 in)
- Position: Goalkeeper

Team information
- Current team: Las Vegas Lights
- Number: 1

Youth career
- Wexford SC
- Toronto Lynx

College career
Years	Team	Apps	(Gls)
2012–2013	Herkimer Generals	34	(0)
2014	Connecticut Huskies	0	(0)
2015	Quinnipiac Bobcats	18	(0)

Senior career*
Years	Team	Apps	(Gls)
2013–2014	Toronto Lynx	5	(0)
2015–2018	Sigma FC	47+	(0)
2019–2024	Forge FC	105	(0)
2024	Memphis 901	7	(0)
2025	Phoenix Rising	4	(0)
2026	FC Tulsa	0	(0)
2026-	Las Vegas Lights	9	(0)
- * Club domestic league appearances and goals as of 10:16, 9 November 2026 (UTC)

Triston Javon Henry (born September 8, 1993) is a Canadian professional soccer player who plays as a goalkeeper for USL Championship club Las Vegas Lights FC.

== Early life ==
Henry began playing goalkeeper in youth soccer at the age of 12. In 2013, he played with the Toronto Lynx U20 in the USL Super-20 League, winning the Safe Hands Award and being named to the All-Tournament team.

== College career ==
Henry began his college career at Herkimer County Community College in 2012. In his two seasons, he helped the team win the NJCAA National Championship both seasons, including posting clean sheets in both championship matches. In 2012, he was the 2012 Regional Tournament MVP, an NSCAA Second Team All-American, NSCAA All-Region First Team, and was also named to the All-National Tournament First Team. In 2013, he was an NSCAA and NJCAA All-American in 2013, and was selected to the NSCAA All-Region First Team and the All-National Tournament Team.

In 2014, he transferred to the University of Connecticut to play for the men's soccer team. He appeared in a pre-season game on August 17 against the Quinnipiac Bobcats, but did not appear in any regular season matches.

In 2015, he transferred to Quinnipiac University to play for the men's soccer team. He made his debut on August 28 against the Boston College Eagles and was named Quinnipiac Athlete of the Month for August 2015.

== Club career ==
=== Early career ===
In 2013 and 2014, he played with the Toronto Lynx in the Premier Development League.

In 2015, he began playing with Sigma FC in League1 Ontario. In 2017, he was named a L1O Second-Team All-Star and was named to the All-Star Game roster. In 2018, he was once again named a L1O Second Team All-Star, and was once again selected to play in the All-Star Game against the PLSQ All-Star team.

=== Forge FC ===
In February 2019, Henry signed his first professional contract with Canadian Premier League side Forge FC, joining his former Sigma coach Bobby Smyrniotis. He made his debut in the league's first ever match on April 27, 2019 against York9 FC. He helped Forge with the first ever CPL title in 2019. In 2020, he helped Forge win their second consecutive league championship and won the Golden Glove Award as the league's top goalkeeper. Forge then subsequently picked up his option for the 2021 season. In his third season, he helped Forge reach the Championship final for the third straight season, however they did not win the title, although he was a finalist for the Golden Glove Award. In 2022, he won his third CPL title in four seasons with Forge. In January 2023, Henry re-signed with Forge on a multi-year deal.

At the end of the 2023 season, once again winning the league title, he was again nominated for the Golden Glove Award, and eventually won it for the second time in his career and was also named to the CPL Best XI. He did not join the club for the beginning of their 2024 season, being excused for 'personal reasons', however, some reports indicated the absence was due to a transfer impasse between Henry and the club. There were reports that Forge rejected a transfer offer during the offseason from Memphis 901 FC of the USL Championship, which Forge denied saying they never received a formal offer. Henry did not join Forge for the 2024 season, sitting out the season, with the club working on securing another transfer for the player. In July 2024, he officially departed the club, after making 142 appearances across all competitions, capturing four league titles and two Golden Glove awards.

=== Memphis 901 ===
On July 23, 2024, Henry officially departed Forge and signed a multi-year contract with Memphis 901 FC in the USL Championship. He made his debut on July 27, keeping a clean sheet, in a 1-0 victory over San Antonio FC. At the end of the season, Memphis folded their club and sold their franchise rights, making Henry a free agent.

=== Phoenix Rising ===
Henry joined Phoenix Rising FC on January 7, 2025.

=== FC Tulsa ===
On February 20, 2026 Henry signed with USL Championship side FC Tulsa.

=== Las Vegas Lights FC ===
On July 21, 2026, Las Vegas Lights of the USL Championship announced they had acquired Henry from FC Tulsa for the remainder of the 2026 USL Championship season.

== Career statistics ==
As of July 27, 2024

Club	League	Season	League		Playoffs		National Cup		Continental		Total	
Club	League	Season	Apps	Goals	Apps	Goals	Apps	Goals	Apps	Goals	Apps	Goals
Toronto Lynx	Premier Development League	2013	2	0	—		—		—		2	0
Toronto Lynx	Premier Development League	2014	3	0	—		—		—		3	0
Toronto Lynx	Total		5	0	0	0	0	0	0	0	5	0
Sigma FC	League1 Ontario	2015	?	?	—		—		—		?	?
Sigma FC	League1 Ontario	2016	11	0	—		—		—		11	0
Sigma FC	League1 Ontario	2017	20	0	—		—		—		20	0
Sigma FC	League1 Ontario	2018	16	0	3	0	—		—		19	0
Sigma FC	Total		47	0	3	0	0	0	0	0	50	0
Forge FC	Canadian Premier League	2019	20	0	2	0	1	0	4	0	27	0
Forge FC	Canadian Premier League	2020	9	0	1	0	—		4	0	14	0
Forge FC	Canadian Premier League	2021	22	0	2	0	2	0	8	0	34	0
Forge FC	Canadian Premier League	2022	27	0	3	0	3 (Note: Includes appearance in the 2020 Canadian Championship final (played in 2022))	0	2	0	35	0
Forge FC	Canadian Premier League	2023	27	0	2	0	3	0	—		32	0
Forge FC	Canadian Premier League	2024	0	0	0	0	0	0	0	0	0	0
Forge FC	Total		105	0	10	0	9	0	18	0	142	0
Memphis 901 FC	USL Championship	2024	7	0	0	0	0	0	—		7	0
Career total			164	0	13	0	9	0	18	0	204	0

== Honours ==
=== Club ===
Forge FC

- Canadian Premier League: 2019, 2020, 2022, 2023

=== Individual ===
- League1 Ontario Second Team All Star: 2017, 2018
- Canadian Premier League Golden Glove: 2020, 2023
