= Kwame Awuah =

Canadian soccer player (born 1995)

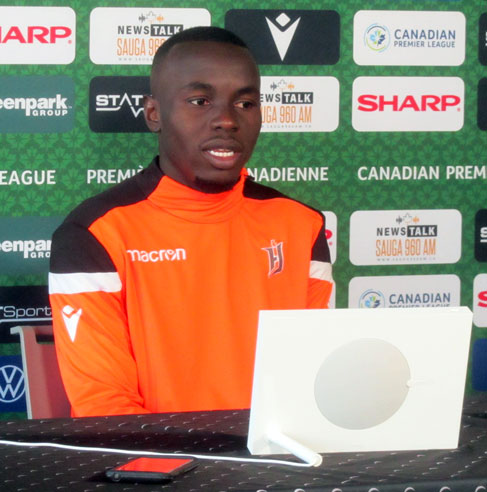
- Awuah in 2021

Personal information
- Date of birth: December 2, 1995 (age 30)
- Place of birth: Toronto, Ontario, Canada
- Height: 1.73 m (5 ft 8 in)
- Positions: Midfielder; left-back

Team information
- Current team: Loudoun United
- Number: 6

Youth career
- Armour Heights SC
- Club Uruguay Toronto
- Woodbridge Strikers
- 2011–2013: Sigma FC

College career
Years	Team	Apps	(Gls)
2013–2016	Connecticut Huskies	64	(8)

Senior career*
Years	Team	Apps	(Gls)
2014–2016	Sigma FC	6	(1)
2017–2018	New York City FC	10	(0)
2019–2021	Forge FC	59	(2)
2022	St. Louis City SC 2	20	(0)
2023–	Loudoun United	94	(1)

International career^{‡}
2017	Canada U23	2	(0)
- * Club domestic league appearances and goals as of October 31, 2026 ‡ National team caps and goals as of May 12, 2017

Kwame Awuah (born December 2, 1995) is a Canadian professional soccer player who currently plays for Loudoun United FC in the USL Championship. He plays as a midfielder and left-back.

== Club career ==
=== Early career ===
Awuah played for the Club Uruguay Toronto, Woodbridge Strikers, the Ontario provincial program and the Dante Alighieri varsity boys soccer team, for which he was elected MVP. In 2013, he graduated from the Sigma FC Academy program.

Awuah then played for the UConn Huskies where he played as a left back, a center midfielder, and a left winger. He won many awards during his time there, including being selected to the American Athletic Conference First Team multiple times.

=== Sigma FC ===
In 2014, Awuah signed with his youth club, Sigma FC, which had just joined League1 Ontario, where he played alongside Cyle Larin and Richie Laryea. In 2016, Awuah made six appearances for Sigma and was named to the League1 Ontario Western Conference All-Star Team.

=== New York City FC ===
Awuah was called up to the MLS Combine in 2017 and was subsequently drafted in the first round of the 2017 MLS SuperDraft, sixteenth overall, by New York City FC. He signed a contract with the team on March 10. He then made his debut for New York on May 7, 2017, in a win against Atlanta United FC. Upon conclusion of the 2017 season, New York City FC announced they would exercise Awuah's option for the 2018 season. After two seasons with New York City, Awuah was released at the end of the 2018 season.

=== Forge FC ===
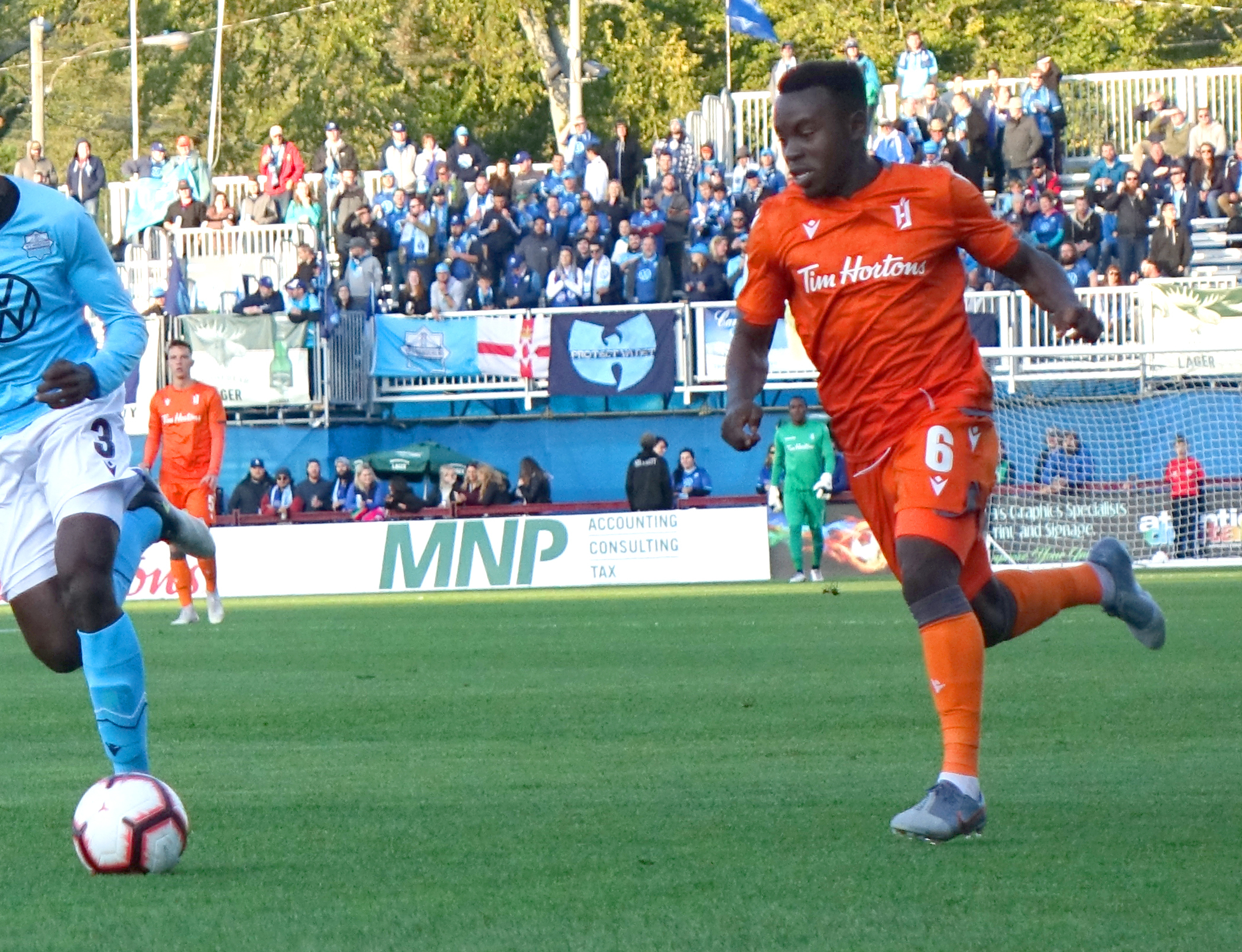
Awuah playing for Forge FC in 2019

On January 29, 2019, Awuah signed with Canadian Premier League club Forge FC, reuniting with former coach Bobby Smyrniotis. In the 2019 Canadian Premier League season, Forge finished in second place in both the spring season and the fall season, qualifying for the finals where they faced Cavalry FC. Forge won 1–0 in both legs for a 2-0 aggregate victory, making them the first ever Canadian Premier League champions. Awuah had five assists throughout the season, tied for first in the league with five other players.

He scored his first goal for the club on August 16, 2020, against FC Edmonton. 2020 was another successful year as Forge became CPL champions for the second time.

Awuah again played a key part in Forge's 2021 campaign, gaining acclaim for his passing and defensive skills. However, Forge came just short of a third consecutive league championship, losing in the final to Pacific FC.

=== St. Louis City SC 2 ===
In January 2022, Awuah trialed with Major League Soccer club Vancouver Whitecaps FC. However, he did not end up signing with the club and instead later joined St. Louis City SC 2 for the team's inaugural season in the newly formed MLS Next Pro.

== International career ==
Awuah was called up to the Canada U23s by new national team manager Octavio Zambrano in March 2017 for some friendlies. Zambrano then called him up to the senior team on May 6, 2017, for a camp and the provisional squad for the 2017 CONCACAF Gold Cup.

== Honours ==
=== Club ===
Forge FC

- Canadian Premier League: 2019, 2020
