= Joshua Navarro =

Costa Rican footballer (born 1999)

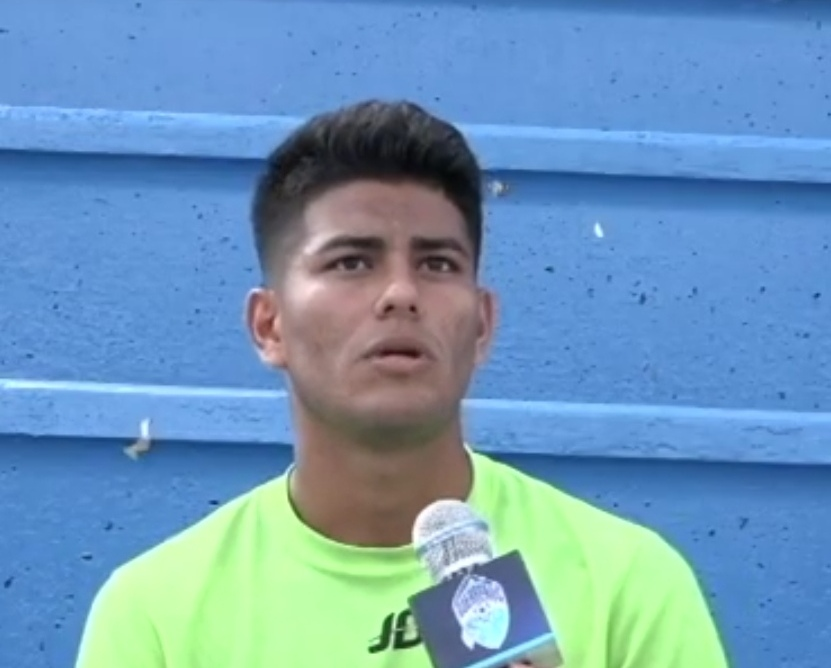

Personal information
- Full name: Joshua Navarro Sandí
- Date of birth: 11 March 1999 (age 27)
- Place of birth: San Isidro de El General, Costa Rica
- Height: 1.78 m (5 ft 10 in)
- Position: Midfielder

Team information
- Current team: Alajuelense
- Number: 28

Senior career*
Years	Team	Apps	(Gls)
2017–2023	Pérez Zeledón	114	(16)
2021	→ Forge FC (loan)	22	(3)
2023–	Alajuelense	63	(7)

International career^{‡}
2018	Costa Rica U20	2	(1)
- * Club domestic league appearances and goals as of 21 May 2025 ‡ National team caps and goals as of 15 June 2021

Joshua Navarro Sandí (born 11 March 1999) is a Costa Rican professional footballer who plays as a midfielder for Alajuelense.

== Club career ==
=== Pérez Zeledón ===
Navarro made his debut in the Liga FPD on 22 July 2018, in a 1–0 loss to Guadalupe.

On 15 June 2021, Navarro was loaned to Canadian Premier League side Forge FC.
