= Elimane Cissé =

Senegalese professional footballer (born 1995)

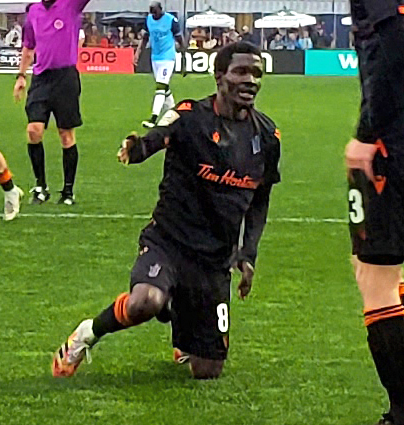
- Cissé with Forge FC in 2021

Personal information
- Full name: Elimane Oumar Cissé
- Date of birth: 12 March 1995 (age 31)
- Place of birth: Dakar, Senegal
- Height: 1.76 m (5 ft 9 in)
- Position: Midfielder

Team information
- Current team: Teungueth FC

Senior career*
Years	Team	Apps	(Gls)
2014–2018	Diambars		
2019–2021	Forge FC	55	(3)
2022	US Touarga		
2022–2023	Diambars		
2024–2025	Forge FC	22	(2)
2026–	Teungueth FC	0	(0)

International career^{‡}
2015	Senegal U20	11	(0)
2016–	Senegal	8	(0)
- * Club domestic league appearances and goals as of 3 November 2025 ‡ National team caps and goals as of 22 January 2023

Elimane Oumar Cissé (born 12 March 1995) is a Senegalese professional footballer who plays as a midfielder for Senegal Ligue1 club Teungueth FC and the Senegal national football team.

== Club career ==
Cissé began playing at the senior level with Diambars in the 2014-15 season. In 2016, he sought out a move to a European club, however, the move failed to materialize.

In February 2019, Cissé signed with Canadian Premier League side Forge FC, ahead of the league's inaugural season. On 20 July 2019, he scored his first goal for the club in a victory over Valour FC. With the club, he won the 2019 and 2020 league titles. In February 2021, he extended his contract for another season. In 2021, he led the team in minutes played and was named to the league Team of the Week five times.

In 2022, he joined Moroccan club US Touarga.

He then subsequently returned to his former club Diambars.

In January 2024, he returned to Forge FC on a multi-year contract. However, due to visa issues, he was unable to join the club until July 2024.

In February 2026, he joined Senegalese Ligue 1 club Teungueth FC.

== International career ==
Cissé is a native of Senegal. He first represented the Senegal U20 national team at the 2015 African U-20 Championship and the 2015 FIFA U-20 World Cup, where Senegal finished fourth.

Cissé made his senior international debut for Senegal on 10 February 2016, in a friendly against Mexico. He made his return to the national team at the 2022 African Nations Championship (held in early 2023), where Senegal won the title. However, he had suffered an injury ahead of the quarter-finals, ending his participation in the tournament.

== Personal life ==
In October 2019, Cissé married his wife, Seynabou, however, because the 2019 Canadian Premier League season was still going on, he could not return to Senegal and communicated with his wife via WhatsApp during the ceremony.

== Honours ==
=== Club ===
Forge FC

- Canadian Premier League: 2019, 2020

=== International ===
Senegal

- African Nations Championship: 2022
