= 2020 York9 FC season =

York9 FC
2020 season
- Chairman: Mike Baldassarra
- Head coach: Jim Brennan
- Stadium: York Lions Stadium
- Canadian Premier League: 5th
- Canadian Championship: Did not qualify
- Top goalscorer: League: Joseph Di Chiara (3); All: Joseph Di Chiara (3)
Home colours	Away colours

The 2020 York9 FC season was the second season in the club's history, and the last under the York9 name.

== Squad ==
As of August 16, 2020.

No.	Player	Nationality	Position(s)	Date of birth (age)	Previous club
Goalkeepers
29	Nathan Ingham	(Canada)	GK	June 27, 1993 (aged 27)	(United States) Pittsburgh Riverhounds SC
37	Ezequiel Carrasco	(Canada)	GK	September 11, 2002 (aged 18)	(Canada) Kleinburg Nobleton SC
Defenders
3	Morey Doner	(Canada)	RB	March 25, 1994 (aged 26)	(Canada) Aurora FC
6	Roger Thompson	(Canada)	CB	December 19, 1991 (aged 29)	(Sweden) Ljungskile SK
13	Luca Gasparotto	(Canada)	CB	March 9, 1995 (aged 25)	(Scotland) Greenock Morton
17	Matthew Arnone	(Canada)	CB	February 28, 1994 (aged 26)	(Canada) HFX Wanderers
20	Diyaeddine Abzi	(Canada)	LB	November 23, 1998 (aged 22)	(Canada) A.S. Blainville
26	Fugo Segawa	(Japan)	LB	July 7, 1997 (aged 23)	(Finland) AC Oulu
Midfielders
5	Chris Mannella	(Canada)	DM / CM	June 7, 1994 (aged 26)	(Canada) Ottawa Fury
8	Joseph Di Chiara	(Canada)	DM / CM	January 30, 1992 (aged 28)	(Lithuania) Jonava
10	Manny Aparicio	(Canada)	CM	September 17, 1995 (aged 25)	(Spain) San Roque de Lepe
14	Ijah Halley	(Canada)	RW / RB	August 14, 2001 (aged 19)	(Canada) Toronto FC Academy
16	Max Ferrari	(Canada)	CM	August 20, 2000 (aged 20)	(Canada) Aurora FC
18	Ryan Telfer	(Trinidad and Tobago)	LW	March 4, 1994 (aged 26)	(Cyprus) Nea Salamis
19	Kyle Porter	(Canada)	RM	January 19, 1990 (aged 30)	(United States) Tampa Bay Rowdies
21	Michael Petrasso	(Canada)	LW / RW	July 9, 1995 (aged 25)	(Canada) Valour FC
22	Julian Altobelli	(Canada)	MF	November 4, 2002 (aged 18)	(Canada) Toronto FC Academy
23	Wataru Murofushi	(Japan)	CM	June 13, 1995 (aged 25)	(Singapore) Albirex Niigata (S)
44	Isaiah Johnston	(Canada)	CM	August 14, 2001 (aged 19)	(Canada) CBU Capers
	Brian López (Note: Player is signed, but hasn't been added to the 2020 roster because of difficulties getting into Canada due to the COVID-19 pandemic)	(Argentina)	DM	June 30, 1999 (aged 21)	(Argentina) Racing
Forwards
7	Álvaro Rivero	(Spain)	ST	April 17, 1997 (aged 23)	(Spain) Leganés B
12	Jace Kotsopoulos	(Canada)	ST	December 1, 1997 (aged 23)	(Canada) Guelph Gryphons
80	Lowell Wright	(Canada)	CF	August 19, 2003 (aged 17)	(Canada) Woodbridge Strikers
99	Gabriel Vasconcelos	(Brazil)	CF	March 15, 1996 (aged 24)	(Brazil) Corinthians
	Nicholas Hamilton	(Jamaica)	ST / RW / LW	March 16, 1996 (aged 24)	(Jamaica) Cavalier

== Transfers ==
=== In ===
No.	Pos.	Player	Transferred from	Fee/notes	Date	Source
5	MF	(Canada) Chris Mannella	(Canada) Ottawa Fury	Free transfer	December 17, 2019	
99	FW	(Brazil) Gabriel Vasconcelos	(Brazil) Corinthians	Free transfer	January 21, 2020	
21	MF	(Canada) Michael Petrasso	(Canada) Valour FC	Free transfer	January 24, 2020	
26	DF	(Japan) Fugo Segawa	(Finland) AC Oulu	Free transfer	February 10, 2020	
	FW	(Jamaica) Nicholas Hamilton	(Jamaica) Cavalier	Free transfer	February 14, 2020	
17	DF	(Canada) Matthew Arnone	(Canada) HFX Wanderers	Free Transfer	February 18, 2020	
	FW	(Peru) Adrián Ugarriza	(Peru) Alianza Lima	Free Transfer	February 24, 2020	
16	MF	(Canada) Max Ferrari	(Canada) Aurora FC	Free Transfer	February 27, 2020	
	FW	(Brazil) Jacó	(Brazil) Iporá	Free Transfer	March 4, 2020	
	MF	(Argentina) Brian López	(Argentina) Racing	Free Transfer	March 5, 2020	
14	MF	(Canada) Ijah Halley	(Canada) Toronto FC Academy	Free Transfer	April 27, 2020	
22	MF	(Canada) Julian Altobelli	(Canada) Toronto FC Academy	Free Transfer	May 13, 2020	
18	MF	(Trinidad and Tobago) Ryan Telfer	(Cyprus) Nea Salamis	Free Transfer	June 3, 2020	
44	MF	(Canada) Isaiah Johnston	(Canada) CBU Capers	Selected 10th overall in the 2019 CPL–U Sports Draft	July 6, 2020	
37	GK	(Canada) Ezequiel Carrasco	(Canada) Kleinburg Nobleton SC	Free Transfer	July 10, 2020	
7	FW	(Spain) Álvaro Rivero	(Spain) Leganés B	Free Transfer	July 27, 2020	
80	FW	(Canada) Lowell Wright	(Canada) Woodbridge Strikers	Free Transfer	July 28, 2020	
12	FW	(Canada) Jace Kotsopoulos	(Canada) Guelph Gryphons	Free Transfer	August 9, 2020	

==== Draft picks ====
York9 FC selected the following players in the 2019 CPL–U Sports Draft on November 11, 2019. Draft picks are not automatically signed to the team roster. Only those who are signed to a contract will be listed as transfers in.

Round	Selection	Pos.	Player	Nationality	University
1	5	FW	Stefan Karajovanovic	Canada	Carleton Ravens
2	10	MF	Isaiah Johnston	Canada	CBU Capers

=== Out ===
No.	Pos.	Player	Transferred to	Fee/notes	Date	Source
7	FW	(Canada) Austin Ricci	(Canada) Valour FC	Contract expired	November 15, 2019	
17	FW	(Canada) Cyrus Rollocks		Contract expired	November 15, 2019	
2	DF	(Canada) Daniel Gogarty		Contract expired	November 15, 2019	
1	GK	(Canada) Matt Silva	(Canada) Valour FC	Contract expired	November 15, 2019	
21	FW	(Canada) Stefan Lamanna		Contract expired	November 15, 2019	
77	DF	(Canada) Steven Furlano		Contract expired	November 15, 2019	
12	FW	(Sweden) Simon Adjei	(Sweden) Assyriska IK	Contract terminated by mutual consent	February 1, 2020	
22	FW	(Chile) Rodrigo Gattas	(Azerbaijan) Gabala FK	Contract expired	February 11, 2020	
11	MF	(Chinese Taipei) Emilio Estevez	(Netherlands) ADO Den Haag	Undisclosed fee	May 12, 2020	
	FW	(Peru) Adrián Ugarriza	(Peru) Cienciano	Contract terminated by mutual consent	July 6, 2020	
31	GK	(Canada) Colm Vance		Contract terminated by mutual consent	July 10, 2020	
	FW	(Brazil) Jacó		Contract terminated by mutual consent	July 27, 2020	
92	FW	(Canada) Michael Cox		Contract expired	August 9, 2020	
5	DF	(Saint Kitts and Nevis) Justin Springer		Contract expired	August 9, 2020	

== Canadian Premier League ==
Match times are Eastern Daylight Time (UTC−4).

=== First stage ===
==== Table ====
Pos	Team	Pld	W	D	L	GF	GA	GD	Pts	Qualification
1	Cavalry	7	4	1	2	10	7	+3	13	Advance to group stage
2	HFX Wanderers	7	3	3	1	12	7	+5	12 (Note: Head-to-head points: HFX Wanderers 1, Forge 1. Goal differential: HFX Wanderers +5, Forge +4)	Advance to group stage
3	Forge	7	3	3	1	13	9	+4	12	Advance to group stage
4	Pacific	7	3	2	2	10	8	+2	11	Advance to group stage
5	York9	7	2	4	1	8	7	+1	10	
6	Valour	7	2	2	3	8	9	−1	8 (Note: Head-to-head points: Valour 3, Atlético Ottawa 0.)	
7	Atlético Ottawa	7	2	2	3	7	12	−5	8	
8	FC Edmonton	7	0	1	6	5	14	−9	1	

Source: CanPL.ca
Rules for classification: 1) points; 2) head-to-head points; 3) goal differential; 4) goals for; 5) total wins; 6) U-21 minutes; 7) coin toss or drawing of lots.

==== Results by match ====
Match	1	2	3	4	5	6	7
Result	D	D	D	W	D	W	L
Position	3	4	4	3	4	3	5

Updated to match(es) played on August 26, 2020. Source: #Matches
W = Win; D = Draw; L = Loss

==== Matches ====
August 15 1	York9 FC	2–2	Atlético Ottawa	Charlottetown, Prince Edward Island
12:00pm	Di Chiara (yellow card) 14', (goal) 62' (pen.); Wright 60'	Report	Neufville (yellow card) 14' (yellow-red card) 50'; Kourouma 45+3'; Shaw 47'	Stadium: Alumni Field; Referee: Mathieu Souaré

August 18 2	Pacific FC	1–1	York9 FC	Charlottetown, Prince Edward Island
8:00pm	Blasco (yellow card) 10'; Bustos (yellow card) 84'; McNaughton 90+2'	Report	Rivero 70'; Di Chiara (yellow card) 83'	Stadium: Alumni Field; Referee: Pierre-Luc Lauzière

August 22 3	York9 FC	0–0	Valour FC	Charlottetown, Prince Edward Island
1:00pm	Aparicio (yellow card) 22'; Telfer (yellow card) 68'	Report	Ohin (yellow card) 22'; Hundal (yellow card) 90+2'	Stadium: Alumni Field; Referee: Carly Shaw-MacLaren

August 26 4	York9 FC	3–2	Forge FC	Charlottetown, Prince Edward Island
1:00pm	Porter 27'; Di Chiara 34' (yellow card) 56' (goal) 60' (pen.); Aparicio (yellow card) 54'	Report	Edgar (yellow card) 40'; Nanco 49'; Achinioti-Jönsson 52'; Awuah (yellow card) 72'; Tissot (yellow card) 90+2'	Stadium: Alumni Field; Referee: Juan Marquez

August 29 5	HFX Wanderers FC	1–1	York9 FC	Charlottetown, Prince Edward Island
3:00pm	Morelli (red card) 22'; Marshall (yellow card) 57'; Schaale (yellow card) 74'; Rampersad (yellow card) 86'; Kreim 90+1'	Report	Aparicio 21'; Segawa (yellow card) 35'; Telfer (yellow card) 61'; Gasparotto (yellow card) 64'; Di Chiara (yellow card) 86'	Stadium: Alumni Field; Referee: David Barrie

September 1 6	FC Edmonton	0–1	York9 FC	Charlottetown, Prince Edward Island
8:00pm	Zetterberg (yellow card) 43'	Report	Aparicio 44'; Mannella (yellow card) 74'	Stadium: Alumni Field; Referee: Myriam Marcotte

September 5 7	Cavalry FC	1–0	York9 FC	Charlottetown, Prince Edward Island
3:00pm	Haber 69'; Ledgerwood (yellow card) 89'	Report	Gasparotto (yellow card) 45+1'; Di Chiara (yellow card) 81'; Telfer (yellow card) 87'	Stadium: Alumni Field; Referee: Pierre-Luc Lauzière

== Statistics ==
=== Squad and statistics ===
As of September 6, 2020

No.	Pos	Nat	Player	Total		Canadian Premier League	
No.	Pos	Nat	Player	Apps	Goals	Apps	Goals
Goalkeepers
29	GK	(Canada) CAN	Nathan Ingham	6	0	6+0	0
37	GK	(Canada) CAN	Ezequiel Carrasco	1	0	1+0	0
Defenders
3	DF	(Canada) CAN	Morey Doner	7	0	7+0	0
6	DF	(Canada) CAN	Roger Thompson	7	0	7+0	0
13	DF	(Canada) CAN	Luca Gasparotto	7	0	7+0	0
17	DF	(Canada) CAN	Matthew Arnone	2	0	1+1	0
20	DF	(Canada) CAN	Diyaeddine Abzi	5	0	5+0	0
26	DF	(Japan) JPN	Fugo Segawa	5	0	4+1	0
Midfielders
5	MF	(Canada) CAN	Chris Mannella	2	0	1+1	0
8	MF	(Canada) CAN	Joseph Di Chiara	6	3	6+0	3
10	MF	(Canada) CAN	Manny Aparicio	6	2	6+0	2
14	MF	(Canada) CAN	Ijah Halley	4	0	2+2	0
16	MF	(Canada) CAN	Max Ferrari	7	0	0+7	0
18	MF	(Trinidad and Tobago) TTO	Ryan Telfer	7	0	7+0	0
19	MF	(Canada) CAN	Kyle Porter	6	1	5+1	1
21	MF	(Canada) CAN	Michael Petrasso	3	0	2+1	0
22	MF	(Canada) CAN	Julian Altobelli	0	0	0+0	0
23	MF	(Japan) JPN	Wataru Murofushi	7	0	3+4	0
44	MF	(Canada) CAN	Isaiah Johnston	3	0	0+3	0
Forwards
7	FW	(Spain) ESP	Álvaro Rivero	7	1	5+2	1
12	FW	(Canada) CAN	Jace Kotsopoulos	1	0	0+1	0
80	FW	(Canada) CAN	Lowell Wright	4	1	1+3	1
99	FW	(Brazil) BRA	Gabriel Vasconcelos	2	0	1+1	0

=== Top scorers ===
Rank	Nat.	Player	Pos.	Canadian Premier League	TOTAL
1	(Canada)	Joseph Di Chiara	MF	3	3
2	(Canada)	Manny Aparicio	FW	2	2
3	(Spain)	Álvaro Rivero	FW	1	1
3	(Canada)	Kyle Porter	FW	1	1
3	(Canada)	Lowell Wright	FW	1	1
Totals				8	8

Updated to match played September 6, 2020
Source: Canadian Premier League

=== Top assists ===
Rank	Nat.	Player	Pos.	Canadian Premier League	TOTAL
1	(Canada)	Kyle Porter	MF	1	1
Totals				1	1

Updated to match played September 6, 2020
Source: Canadian Premier League

=== Clean sheets ===
Rank	Nat.	Player	Canadian Premier League	TOTAL
1	(Canada)	Nathan Ingham	2	2
Totals			2	2

Updated to match played September 6, 2020
Source: Canadian Premier League

=== Disciplinary record ===
No.	Pos.	Nat.	Player	Canadian Premier League		TOTAL	
No.	Pos.	Nat.	Player	Yellow card	Red card	Yellow card	Red card
5	MF	(Canada)	Joseph Di Chiara	5	0	5	0
10	MF	(Trinidad and Tobago)	Ryan Telfer	3	0	3	0
26	DF	(Canada)	Manny Aparicio	2	0	2	0
13	DF	(Canada)	Luca Gasparotto	2	0	2	0
18	MF	(Canada)	Chris Mannella	1	0	1	0
8	MF	(Japan)	Fugo Segawa	1	0	1	0
Totals				11	0	11	0

Updated to match played September 6, 2020
Source: Canadian Premier League
