= 2019 York9 FC season =

York9 FC
2019 season
- President: Preben Ganzhorn
- Head coach: Jim Brennan
- Stadium: York Lions Stadium
- Canadian Premier League: Spring: 6th Fall: 3rd Overall: 3rd
- CPL finals: Did not qualify
- Canadian Championship: Third qualifying round
- Top goalscorer: League: Rodrigo Gattas (9); All: Rodrigo Gattas (11)
- Highest home attendance: 5,252 (July 10 vs. Montreal Impact)
- Lowest home attendance: 728 (June 5 vs. FC Edmonton)
- Average home league attendance: League: 2,724; All: 2,700
Home colours	Away colours

The 2019 York9 FC season was the first season in York9 FC's history, as well as the first season in Canadian Premier League history.

== Squad ==
As of November 2, 2019.

No.	Player	Nationality	Position(s)	Date of birth (age)	Previous club
Goalkeepers
1	Matt Silva	(Canada)	GK	March 28, 1991 (aged 28)	(Sweden) Österlen FF
29	Nathan Ingham	(Canada)	GK	June 27, 1993 (aged 26)	(United States) Pittsburgh Riverhounds SC
31	Colm Vance	(Canada)	GK	August 31, 1992 (aged 27)	(Canada) Vaughan Azzurri
Defenders
2	Daniel Gogarty	(Canada)	CB	December 7, 1996 (aged 23)	(Canada) York Lions
3	Morey Doner	(Canada)	RB	March 25, 1994 (aged 25)	(Canada) Aurora FC
5	Justin Springer	(Saint Kitts and Nevis)	CB	July 8, 1993 (aged 26)	(Canada) Vaughan Azzurri
6	Roger Thompson	(Canada)	CB	December 19, 1991 (aged 28)	(Sweden) Ljungskile SK
13	Luca Gasparotto	(Canada)	CB	March 9, 1995 (aged 24)	(Scotland) Greenock Morton
20	Diyaeddine Abzi	(Canada)	LB	November 23, 1998 (aged 21)	(Canada) A.S. Blainville
77	Steven Furlano	(Canada)	RB / CM	February 6, 1998 (aged 21)	(Canada) Alliance United
Midfielders
8	Joseph Di Chiara	(Canada)	DM / CM	January 30, 1992 (aged 27)	(Lithuania) Jonava
10	Manny Aparicio	(Canada)	CM	September 17, 1995 (aged 24)	(Spain) San Roque de Lepe
11	Emilio Estevez	(Chinese Taipei)	MF	August 10, 1998 (aged 21)	(Canada) North Mississauga SC
18	Ryan Telfer	(Trinidad and Tobago)	LW	March 4, 1994 (aged 25)	(Canada) Toronto FC
19	Kyle Porter	(Canada)	RM	January 19, 1990 (aged 29)	(United States) Tampa Bay Rowdies
23	Wataru Murofushi	(Japan)	CM	June 13, 1995 (aged 24)	(Singapore) Albirex Niigata (S)
Forwards
7	Austin Ricci	(Canada)	ST	April 8, 1996 (aged 23)	(Canada) Vaughan Azzurri
12	Simon Adjei	(Sweden)	CF	November 10, 1993 (aged 26)	(Sweden) Assyriska IK
17	Cyrus Rollocks	(Canada)	ST	March 23, 1998 (aged 21)	(Canada) Master's Futbol
21	Stefan Lamanna	(Canada)	ST	July 31, 1995 (aged 24)	(Iceland) Tindastóll
22	Rodrigo Gattas	(Chile)	ST	December 2, 1991 (aged 28)	(Chile) Rangers
92	Michael Cox	(Canada)	CF	August 2, 1992 (aged 27)	(United States) Saint Louis FC

== Transfers ==
=== In ===
No.	Pos.	Player	Transferred from	Fee/notes	Date	Source
19	MF	(Canada) Kyle Porter	(United States) Tampa Bay Rowdies	Free Transfer	November 29, 2018	
12	FW	(Sweden) Simon Adjei	(Sweden) Assyriska IK	Free Transfer	December 3, 2018	
7	FW	(Canada) Austin Ricci	(Canada) Vaughan Azzurri	Free Transfer	December 14, 2018	
77	DF	(Canada) Steven Furlano	(Canada) Alliance United	Free Transfer	December 20, 2018	
6	DF	(Canada) Roger Thompson	(Sweden) Ljungskile SK	Free Transfer	January 7, 2019	
8	MF	(Canada) Joseph Di Chiara	(Lithuania) Jonava	Free Transfer	January 7, 2019	
10	MF	(Canada) Manny Aparicio	(Spain) San Roque de Lepe	Free Transfer	January 14, 2019	
17	FW	(Canada) Cyrus Rollocks	(Canada) Master's Futbol	Free Transfer	January 17, 2019	
23	MF	(Japan) Wataru Murofushi	(Singapore) Albirex Niigata (S)	Free Transfer	January 22, 2019	
1	GK	(Canada) Matt Silva	(Sweden) Österlen FF	Free Transfer	February 2, 2019	
92	FW	(Canada) Michael Cox	(United States) Saint Louis FC	Free Transfer	February 2, 2019	
2	DF	(Canada) Daniel Gogarty	(Canada) York University Lions	Selected 4th overall in the 2018 CPL–U Sports Draft	February 4, 2019	
5	DF	(Saint Kitts and Nevis) Justin Springer	(Canada) Vaughan Azzurri	Free Transfer	February 8, 2019	
3	DF	(Canada) Morey Doner	(Canada) Aurora FC	Free Transfer	February 8, 2019	
11	MF	(Chinese Taipei) Emilio Estevez	(Canada) North Mississauga SC	Free Transfer	February 8, 2019	
13	DF	(Canada) Luca Gasparotto	(Scotland) Greenock Morton	Free Transfer	February 14, 2019	
20	DF	(Canada) Diyaeddine Abzi	(Canada) A.S. Blainville	Free Transfer	February 22, 2019	
31	GK	(Canada) Colm Vance	(Canada) Vaughan Azzurri	Free Transfer	March 8, 2019	
29	GK	(Canada) Nathan Ingham	(United States) Pittsburgh Riverhounds SC	Free Transfer	April 8, 2019	
14	MF	(Canada) Emmanuel Zambazis	(Canada) York Lions	Selected 11th overall in the 2018 CPL–U Sports Draft	April 24, 2019	
22	FW	(Chile) Rodrigo Gattas	(Chile) Rangers	Free Transfer	April 26, 2019	
21	FW	(Canada) Stefan Lamanna	(Iceland) Tindastóll	Free Transfer	July 27, 2019	

==== Draft picks ====
York9 FC selected the following players in the 2018 CPL–U Sports Draft on November 12, 2018. Draft picks are not automatically signed to the team roster. Only those who are signed to a contract will be listed as transfers in.

Round	Selection	Pos.	Player	Nationality	Previous club
1	4	DF	Daniel Gogarty	Canada	York Lions
2	11	MF	Emmanuel Zambazis	Canada	York Lions
3	18	DF	Daniel Pritchard	England	CBU Capers

=== Loan In ===
No.	Pos.	Player	Transferred from	Fee/notes	Date	Source
18	MF	(Trinidad and Tobago) Ryan Telfer	(Canada) Toronto FC	Season-long Loan	March 6, 2019	

=== Out ===
No.	Pos.	Player	Transferred to	Fee/notes	Date	Source
14	MF	(Canada) Emmanuel Zambazis		Contract Terminated	September 2, 2019	

== Competitions ==
Match times are Eastern Daylight Time (UTC−4).

=== Preseason ===
April 13	York9 FC	0–1	Cavalry FC	Punta Cana, Dominican Republic
		Report	Bitar

=== Canadian Premier League ===
==== Spring season ====
===== Table =====
Pos	Team	Pld	W	D	L	GF	GA	GD	Pts	Qualification
1	Cavalry	10	8	0	2	16	7	+9	24	2019 Canadian Premier League Finals
2	Forge	10	6	1	3	15	7	+8	19	2019 CONCACAF League preliminary round (Note: As winner of home and away matches between FC Edmonton, Forge FC, and Valour FC)
3	FC Edmonton	10	4	2	4	8	9	−1	14	
4	HFX Wanderers	10	3	2	5	8	11	−3	11	
5	Pacific	10	3	2	5	11	15	−4	11	
6	York9	10	2	5	3	9	11	−2	11	
7	Valour	10	3	0	7	8	15	−7	9	

Source: CanPL.ca
Rules for classification: 1) points; 2) total wins; 3) goal differential; 4) goals for; 5) away goal differential; 6) away goals for; 7) home goal differential; 8) home goals for; 9) coin toss or drawing of lots.

===== Results summary =====
Overall								Home						Away					
Pld	W	D	L	GF	GA	GD	Pts	W	D	L	GF	GA	GD	W	D	L	GF	GA	GD
10	2	5	3	9	11	−2	11	1	2	2	1	4	−3	1	3	1	8	7	+1

Last updated: July 1, 2019.
Source: canpl.ca

===== Results by match =====
Match	1	2	3	4	5	6	7	8	9	10
Ground	A	A	A	H	A	H	H	H	H	A
Result	D	L	D	L	D	W	D	D	L	W
Position	1	6	7	7	7	5	6	6	7	6

Updated to match(es) played on July 1, 2019. Source: #Matches
A = Away; H = Home; W = Win; D = Draw; L = Loss

===== Matches =====
April 27 1 Inaugural match	Forge FC	1–1	York9 FC	Hamilton, Ontario
1:00 pm	Frano (yellow card) 68'; Thomas 78'	Report	Telfer 3'; Aparicio (yellow card) 59' (yellow-red card) 90+5'	Stadium: Tim Hortons Field; Attendance: 17,611; Referee: David Gantar

May 4 2	Cavalry FC	2–1	York9 FC	Foothills County, Alberta
3:30 pm	Brown 26'; Northover (yellow card) 31'; Wheeldon (yellow card) 56'; Zator 78'; Oliver (yellow card) 90+3'	Report	Estevez (yellow card) 60'; Murofushi (yellow card) 68'; Furlano (yellow card) 81'; Adjei 83'	Stadium: Spruce Meadows; Attendance: 3,486; Referee: Drew Fischer

May 18 3	Pacific FC	2–2	York9 FC	Langford, British Columbia
3:30 pm	Haber 28'; Fisk 42'; Smith (yellow card) 74'; Village (yellow card) 90+3'	Report	Aparicio (yellow card) 24'; Gattas 53' (pen.), (yellow card) 90+3'; McCurdy 58' (o.g.)	Stadium: Westhills Stadium; Attendance: 2,661; Referee: Pierre-Luc Lauziere

May 25 4	York9 FC	0–2	Forge FC	Toronto, Ontario
4:00 pm	Gattas (yellow card) 67'; Gasparotto (yellow card) 90+3'	Report	Novak (yellow card) 64'; Nanco 70'; Borges 78'	Stadium: York Lions Stadium; Attendance: 4,260; Referee: Yusri Rudolf
Note: Match was delayed in the 62nd minute for 75 minutes due to lightning.

May 29 5	HFX Wanderers FC	1–1	York9 FC	Halifax, Nova Scotia
6:00 pm	Arnone (yellow card) 4'; Schaale 15'; Langwa (yellow card) 24'; Simmons (yellow card) 39'	Report	Gattas 5' (pen.); Estevez (yellow card) 21'; Porter (yellow card) 26'; Gogarty (yellow card) 52'	Stadium: Wanderers Grounds; Attendance: 5,387; Referee: Fabrizio Stasolla

June 15 6	York9 FC	1–0	Pacific FC	Toronto, Ontario
12:00 pm	McCurdy 36' (o.g.)	Report	Baldisimo (yellow card) 56'; González (yellow card) 64'	Stadium: York Lions Stadium; Attendance: 2,914; Referee: David Barrie

June 19 7	York9 FC	0–0	FC Edmonton	Toronto, Ontario
7:00 pm	Di Chiara (yellow card) 78'	Report		Stadium: York Lions Stadium; Attendance: 2,500; Referee: Filip Dujic

June 22 8	York9 FC	0–0	HFX Wanderers FC	Toronto, Ontario
3:30 pm	Murofushi (yellow card) 22'	Report	Bona (yellow card) 15'; N'sa (yellow card) 90+2'	Stadium: York Lions Stadium; Attendance: 2,101; Referee: Fabrizio Stasolla

June 26 9	York9 FC	0–2	Cavalry FC	Toronto, Ontario
7:00 pm	Aparicio (yellow card) 22'; Di Chiara (yellow card) 69'	Report	Malonga (yellow card) 14' (goal) 24'; Büscher 35'; Pasquotti (yellow card) 65'	Stadium: York Lions Stadium; Attendance: 1,829; Referee: Pierre-Luc Lauzière

July 1 10	Valour FC	1–3	York9 FC	Winnipeg, Manitoba
1:00 pm	Attardo 1'	Report	Doner 7'; Aparicio 57'; Adjei 90+5'	Stadium: IG Field; Attendance: 6,678; Referee: Yusri Rudolf

==== Fall season ====
===== Table =====
Pos	Team	Pld	W	D	L	GF	GA	GD	Pts	Qualification
1	Cavalry	18	11	5	2	35	12	+23	38	2019 Canadian Premier League Finals
2	Forge	18	11	4	3	30	19	+11	37	
3	York9	18	7	2	9	30	26	+4	23	
4	Pacific	18	5	5	8	24	31	−7	20	
5	Valour	18	5	4	9	22	37	−15	19	
6	FC Edmonton	18	4	6	8	19	24	−5	18	
7	HFX Wanderers	18	3	8	7	13	24	−11	17	

Source: CanPL.ca
Rules for classification: 1) points; 2) total wins; 3) goal differential; 4) goals for; 5) away goal differential; 6) away goals for; 7) home goal differential; 8) home goals for; 9) coin toss or drawing of lots.

===== Results summary =====
Overall								Home						Away					
Pld	W	D	L	GF	GA	GD	Pts	W	D	L	GF	GA	GD	W	D	L	GF	GA	GD
18	7	2	9	30	26	+4	23	4	1	4	17	15	+2	3	1	5	13	11	+2

Last updated: October 19, 2019.
Source: canpl.ca

===== Results by match =====
Match	1	2	3	4	5	6	7	8	9	10	11	12	13	14	15	16	17	18
Ground	A	H	H	A	H	H	H	A	A	A	A	H	A	H	A	H	A	H
Result	L	W	W	L	W	L	L	L	D	L	W	L	W	D	L	W	W	L
Position	7	4	3	3	3	4	4	5	5	6	4	6	3	3	4	3	3	3

Updated to match(es) played on October 19, 2019. Source: #Matches
A = Away; H = Home; W = Win; D = Draw; L = Loss

===== Matches =====
July 6 1	HFX Wanderers FC	1–0	York9 FC	Halifax, Nova Scotia
3:30 pm	Garcia 55'	Report	Abzi (yellow card) 84'	Stadium: Wanderers Grounds; Attendance: 6,244; Referee: Juan Marquez

July 14 2	York9 FC	2–1	FC Edmonton	Toronto, Ontario
3:30 pm	Porter 13'; Gasparotto (yellow card) 36'; Telfer 80'	Report	Velado-Tsegaye (yellow card) 43'; Soria 67'; Ameobi (yellow card) 69'	Stadium: York Lions Stadium; Attendance: 2,219; Referee: Scott Bowman

July 17 3	York9 FC	2–1	Pacific FC	Toronto, Ontario
7:00 pm	Aparicio 21' (yellow card) 21'; Adjei 67'	Report	Legault (yellow card) 36'; Campbell 66'; Hernández (yellow card) 90+3'	Stadium: York Lions Stadium; Attendance: 1,769; Referee: Filip Dujic

July 21 4	Cavalry FC	1–0	York9 FC	Foothills County, Alberta
3:30 pm	Gasparotto 10' (o.g.)	Report	Furlano (yellow card) 77'	Stadium: ATCO Field; Attendance: 3,538; Referee: Filip Dujic

July 27 5	York9 FC	6–2	HFX Wanderers FC	Toronto, Ontario
3:30 pm	Telfer 11', 63'; Gattas 22', 31', 45'; Aparicio (yellow card) 40'; Gasparotto (yellow card) 45+4'; Estevez 85'	Report	N'sa (yellow card) 19'; Perea (yellow card) 45+4'; Bona (yellow card) 53'; Skublak 60'; De Carolis (yellow card) 68'; Rampersad (yellow card) 69'; Thompson 75' (o.g.)	Stadium: York Lions Stadium; Attendance: 3,154; Referee: Pierre-Luc Lauzière

August 10 6	York9 FC	0–2	Valour FC	Toronto, Ontario
3:30 pm	Zambazis (yellow card) 60'	Report	Paolucci 7'; Mitter (yellow card) 66'; Galán (yellow card) 82'; Petrasso 90+4'	Stadium: York Lions Stadium; Attendance: 2,438; Referee: David Barrie

August 17 7	York9 FC	0–2	Pacific FC	Toronto, Ontario
3:30 pm	Aparicio (yellow card) 33'; Gogarty (yellow card) 45+1'	Report	Blasco (yellow card) 33'; Campbell 38'; Chung (yellow card) 59'; Verhoven 90+2'	Stadium: York Lions Stadium; Attendance: 2,748; Referee: Scott Bowman

August 21 8	Cavalry FC	3–1	York9 FC	Foothills County, Alberta
9:00 pm	Malonga 5', 51'; Büscher 45+1'; Adekugbe (yellow card) 59'	Report	Porter 15'; Di Chiara (yellow card) 44'; Springer (yellow card) 57'; Furlano (yellow card) 77'	Stadium: ATCO Field; Attendance: 3,176; Referee: Yusri Rudolf

August 25 9	FC Edmonton	2–2	York9 FC	Edmonton, Alberta
6:00 pm	Diouck 4'; Didic (yellow card) 50'; Ongaro 71'; Temguia (yellow card) 76'	Report	Murofushi 11'; Doner (yellow card) 66'; Telfer 85'	Stadium: Clarke Stadium; Attendance: 2,534; Referee: Marie-Soleil Beaudoin

September 8 10	Forge FC	2–1	York9 FC	Hamilton, Ontario
1:00 pm	Borges 21'; Zajac 52'	Report	Doner (yellow card) 38'; Murofushi 65' (pen.)	Stadium: Tim Hortons Field; Attendance: 5,267; Referee: Yusri Rudolf
Note: Originally scheduled for August 2

September 11 11	Pacific FC	0–2	York9 FC	Langford, British Columbia
10:00 pm	Starostzik (yellow card) 55'	Report	Di Chiara (yellow card) 43'; Adjei 64', 83'	Stadium: Westhills Stadium; Attendance: 1,200; Referee: Nicolas Joubert

September 15 12	York9 FC	2–4	Valour FC	Toronto, Ontario
3:30 pm	Rodrigo Gattas 7', 59'; Telfer (yellow card) 90'	Report	Attardo 18', 55'; Sacramento 20'; Galán (yellow card) 43'; Musse 65'; Carreiro (yellow card) 75'	Stadium: York Lions Stadium; Attendance: 3,863; Referee: Marie-Soleil Beaudoin

September 21 13	FC Edmonton	1–3	York9 FC	Edmonton, Alberta
3:30 pm	Soria (yellow card) 35'; Sarkaria (yellow card) 41'; Ongaro 65'	Report	Gasparotto 8'; Gattas 21'; Telfer 31'	Stadium: Clarke Stadium; Attendance: 2,690; Referee: Alain Ruch

September 28 14	York9 FC	1–1	Cavalry FC	Toronto, Ontario
6:00 pm	Di Chiara (yellow card) 43'; Telfer (yellow card) 52'; Murofushi 90+6'	Report	Eustáquio (yellow card) 63'; Escalante (red card) 66'; Mavila (yellow card) 66' (yellow-red card) 73'; Pasquotti 82' (yellow card) 90+2'; Ledgerwood (yellow card) 89'	Stadium: York Lions Stadium; Attendance: 2,568; Referee: Filip Dujic

October 6 15	Forge FC	1–0	York9 FC	Hamilton, Ontario
3:30 pm	Borges 71' (pen.); Zajac (yellow card) 90+3'	Report	Di Chiara (yellow card) 69'; Springer (yellow card) 74'	Stadium: Tim Hortons Field; Attendance: 4,864; Referee: Fabrizio Stasolla

October 12 16	York9 FC	4–0	Forge FC	Toronto, Ontario
3:30 pm	Di Chiara 22' (pen.); Adjei 57'; Abzi 66'; Gattas 90'	Report		Stadium: York Lions Stadium; Attendance: 2,314; Referee: Filip Dujic
Note: Originally scheduled for August 28, 7:00 pm

October 16 17	Valour FC	0–4	York9 FC	Winnipeg, Manitoba
8:00 pm	Thomas (yellow card) 53'	Report	Thompson (yellow card) 9'; Telfer 48', 83'; Di Chiara 54' (pen.); Abzi (yellow card) 58'; Furlano (yellow card) 78'; Adjei 89'	Stadium: IG Field; Attendance: 3,980; Referee: Sebastian Noshinravani

October 19 18	York9 FC	0–2	HFX Wanderers FC	Toronto, Ontario
1:30 pm	Doner (yellow card) 35'; Murofushi (yellow card) 76'	Report	Gutiérrez 27'; Iida 33'; Bona (yellow card) 64'	Stadium: York Lions Stadium; Attendance: 3,452; Referee: Ben Hoskins

=== Canadian Championship ===
==== First qualifying round ====
May 15 Leg 1	A.S. Blainville	0–0	York9 FC	Blainville, Quebec
7:00 pm		Report		Stadium: Parc Equestre Blainville; Attendance: 1,503; Referee: Filip Dujic

May 22 Leg 2	York9 FC	1–0 (1–0 agg.)	A.S. Blainville	Toronto, Ontario
7:00 pm	Gasparotto (yellow card) 11'; Telfer (yellow card) 54', (goal) 70'	Report	Syla (yellow card) 32'; Bertrand (yellow card) 37'; Dicko-Raynauld (yellow card) 79'	Stadium: York Lions Stadium; Attendance: 1,723; Referee: Mathieu Souare

==== Second qualifying round ====
June 5 Leg 1	York9 FC	3–1	FC Edmonton	Toronto, Ontario
7:00 pm	Gasparotto 28'; Gattas 31'; Aparicio (yellow card) 43'; Adjei 51'	Report	Diouck 66'; Esua (yellow card) 67'; Edwini-Bonsu (yellow card) 74'; Marcelin (yellow card) 90+3'	Stadium: York Lions Stadium; Attendance: 728; Referee: Serge Topalian

June 12 Leg 2	FC Edmonton	1–0 (2–3 agg.)	York9 FC	Edmonton, Alberta
9:30 pm	Edwini-Bonsu (yellow card) 43'; Marcelin (yellow card) 85'; Temguia 90+4'	Report	Gogarty (yellow card) 57'	Stadium: Clarke Stadium; Attendance: 2,076; Referee: Fabrizio Stasolla

==== Third qualifying round ====
July 10 Leg 1	York9 FC	2–2	Montreal Impact	Toronto, Ontario
7:30 PM	Adjei (yellow card) 22'; Di Chiara (yellow card) 51'; Telfer 83'; Gattas 88' (yellow card) 88'	Report	Brault-Guillard (yellow card) 31'; Browne 62'; Taïder 90+2' (pen.)	Stadium: York Lions Stadium; Attendance: 5,252; Referee: Yusri Rudolf

July 24 Leg 2	Montreal Impact	1–0 (3–2 agg.)	York9 FC	Montreal, Quebec
7:30 PM	Piatti 55' (pen.); Taïder (yellow card) 85'	Report	Di Chiara (yellow card) 85'	Stadium: Saputo Stadium; Attendance: 14,723; Referee: David Barrie

== Statistics ==
=== Squad and statistics ===
As of October 19, 2019

No.	Pos	Nat	Player	Total		CPL Spring Season		CPL Fall Season		Canadian Championship	
No.	Pos	Nat	Player	Apps	Goals	Apps	Goals	Apps	Goals	Apps	Goals
Goalkeepers
1	GK	(Canada) CAN	Matt Silva	1	0	0+0	0	1+0	0	0+0	0
29	GK	(Canada) CAN	Nathan Ingham	32	0	10+0	0	16+0	0	6+0	0
31	GK	(Canada) CAN	Colm Vance	1	0	0+0	0	1+0	0	0+0	0
Defenders
2	DF	(Canada) CAN	Daniel Gogarty	24	0	9+1	0	8+2	0	4+0	0
3	DF	(Canada) CAN	Morey Doner	29	1	7+0	1	18+0	0	4+0	0
5	DF	(Saint Kitts and Nevis) SKN	Justin Springer	15	0	3+0	0	8+0	0	1+3	0
6	DF	(Canada) CAN	Roger Thompson	12	0	1+1	0	8+0	0	2+0	0
13	DF	(Canada) CAN	Luca Gasparotto	34	2	10+0	0	18+0	1	6+0	1
20	DF	(Canada) CAN	Diyaeddine Abzi	30	1	8+2	0	13+1	1	6+0	0
77	DF	(Canada) CAN	Steven Furlano	18	0	2+2	0	2+9	0	1+2	0
Midfielders
8	MF	(Canada) CAN	Joseph Di Chiara	27	2	4+2	0	16+1	2	2+2	0
10	MF	(Canada) CAN	Manny Aparicio	31	2	9+0	1	16+0	1	6+0	0
11	MF	(Chinese Taipei) TPE	Emilio Estevez	21	1	4+4	0	1+9	1	2+1	0
14	MF	(Canada) CAN	Emmanuel Zambazis	4	0	0+1	0	3+0	0	0+0	0
18	MF	(Trinidad and Tobago) TTO	Ryan Telfer	32	10	10+0	1	14+2	7	5+1	2
19	MF	(Canada) CAN	Kyle Porter	31	2	8+0	0	15+2	2	6+0	0
23	MF	(Japan) JPN	Wataru Murofushi	29	3	8+1	0	12+2	3	5+1	0
Forwards
7	FW	(Canada) CAN	Austin Ricci	11	0	1+3	0	1+4	0	0+2	0
12	FW	(Sweden) SWE	Simon Adjei	30	8	5+2	2	11+6	5	6+0	1
17	FW	(Canada) CAN	Cyrus Rollocks	11	0	3+5	0	0+1	0	0+2	0
21	FW	(Canada) CAN	Stefan Lamanna	6	0	0+0	0	0+6	0	0+0	0
22	FW	(Chile) CHI	Rodrigo Gattas	34	11	8+2	2	14+4	7	5+1	2
92	FW	(Canada) CAN	Michael Cox	6	0	0+2	0	2+1	0	0+1	0

=== Top scorers ===
Rank	Nat.	Player	Pos.	CPL Spring season	CPL Fall season	Canadian Championship	TOTAL
1	(Chile)	Rodrigo Gattas	FW	2	7	2	11
2	(Trinidad and Tobago)	Ryan Telfer	MF	1	7	2	10
3	(Sweden)	Simon Adjei	FW	2	5	1	8
4	(Japan)	Wataru Murofushi	MF	0	3	0	3
5	(Canada)	Manny Aparicio	MF	1	1	0	2
5	(Canada)	Joseph Di Chiara	MF	0	2	0	2
5	(Canada)	Luca Gasparotto	DF	0	1	1	2
5	(Canada)	Kyle Porter	MF	0	2	0	2
9	(Canada)	Diyaeddine Abzi	DF	0	1	0	1
9	(Canada)	Morey Doner	DF	1	0	0	1
9	(Chinese Taipei)	Emilio Estevez	MF	0	1	0	1
Own goals				2	0	0	2
Totals				9	30	6	45

Updated to match played October 19, 2019
Source: Canadian Premier League

=== Top assists ===
Rank	Nat.	Player	Pos.	CPL Spring season	CPL Fall season	Canadian Championship	TOTAL
1	(Canada)	Kyle Porter	MF	1	3	2	6
2	(Canada)	Diyaeddine Abzi	DF	0	4	0	4
2	(Canada)	Morey Doner	DF	0	4	0	4
4	(Sweden)	Simon Adjei	FW	0	2	0	2
4	(Canada)	Manny Aparicio	MF	0	2	0	2
4	(Canada)	Steven Furlano	DF	0	2	0	2
4	(Trinidad and Tobago)	Ryan Telfer	MF	0	1	1	2
8	(Canada)	Joseph Di Chiara	MF	0	1	0	1
8	(Chinese Taipei)	Emilio Estevez	MF	1	0	0	1
8	(Canada)	Luca Gasparotto	DF	0	0	1	1
8	(Chile)	Rodrigo Gattas	FW	0	0	1	1
8	(Canada)	Stefan Lamanna	MF	0	1	0	1
8	(Canada)	Austin Ricci	FW	1	0	0	1
8	(Canada)	Emmanuel Zambazis	MF	0	1	0	1
Totals				3	21	5	29

Updated to match played October 19, 2019
Source: Canadian Premier League

=== Clean sheets ===
Rank	Nat.	Player	CPL Spring season	CPL Fall season	Canadian Championship	TOTAL
1	(Canada)	Nathan Ingham	3	3	2	8
Totals			3	3	2	8

Updated to match played October 19, 2019
Source: Canadian Premier League

=== Disciplinary record ===
No.	Pos.	Nat.	Player	CPL Spring season		CPL Fall season		Canadian Championship		TOTAL	
No.	Pos.	Nat.	Player	Yellow card	Red card	Yellow card	Red card	Yellow card	Red card	Yellow card	Red card
2	DF	(Canada)	Daniel Gogarty	1	0	1	0	1	0	3	0
3	DF	(Canada)	Morey Doner	0	0	3	0	0	0	3	0
5	DF	(Saint Kitts and Nevis)	Justin Springer	0	0	2	0	0	0	2	0
6	DF	(Canada)	Roger Thompson	0	0	1	0	0	0	1	0
8	MF	(Canada)	Joseph Di Chiara	2	0	4	0	2	0	8	0
10	MF	(Canada)	Manny Aparicio	2	1	3	0	1	0	6	1
11	MF	(Chinese Taipei)	Emilio Estevez	2	0	0	0	0	0	2	0
12	FW	(Sweden)	Simon Adjei	0	0	0	0	1	0	1	0
13	DF	(Canada)	Luca Gasparotto	1	0	2	0	1	0	4	0
14	MF	(Canada)	Emmanuel Zambazis	0	0	1	0	0	0	1	0
18	MF	(Trinidad and Tobago)	Ryan Telfer	0	0	2	0	1	0	3	0
19	MF	(Canada)	Kyle Porter	1	0	0	0	0	0	1	0
20	DF	(Canada)	Diyaeddine Abzi	0	0	2	0	0	0	2	0
22	FW	(Chile)	Rodrigo Gattas	2	0	0	0	1	0	3	0
23	MF	(Japan)	Wataru Murofushi	2	0	1	0	0	0	3	0
77	DF	(Canada)	Steven Furlano	1	0	3	0	0	0	4	0
Totals				14	1	25	0	8	0	47	1

Updated to match played October 19, 2019
Source: Canadian Premier League
