= Rollocks =

Rollocks may refer to

- Cyrus Rollocks, a Canadian soccer player
- Daisy Rollocks, better known as Daisy Dee, a singer, actress and TV host
- An alternative spelling of rowlocks, used to hold oars
