= Canadian Premier League inaugural match =

2019 football match in Ontario, Canada

CPL inaugural match
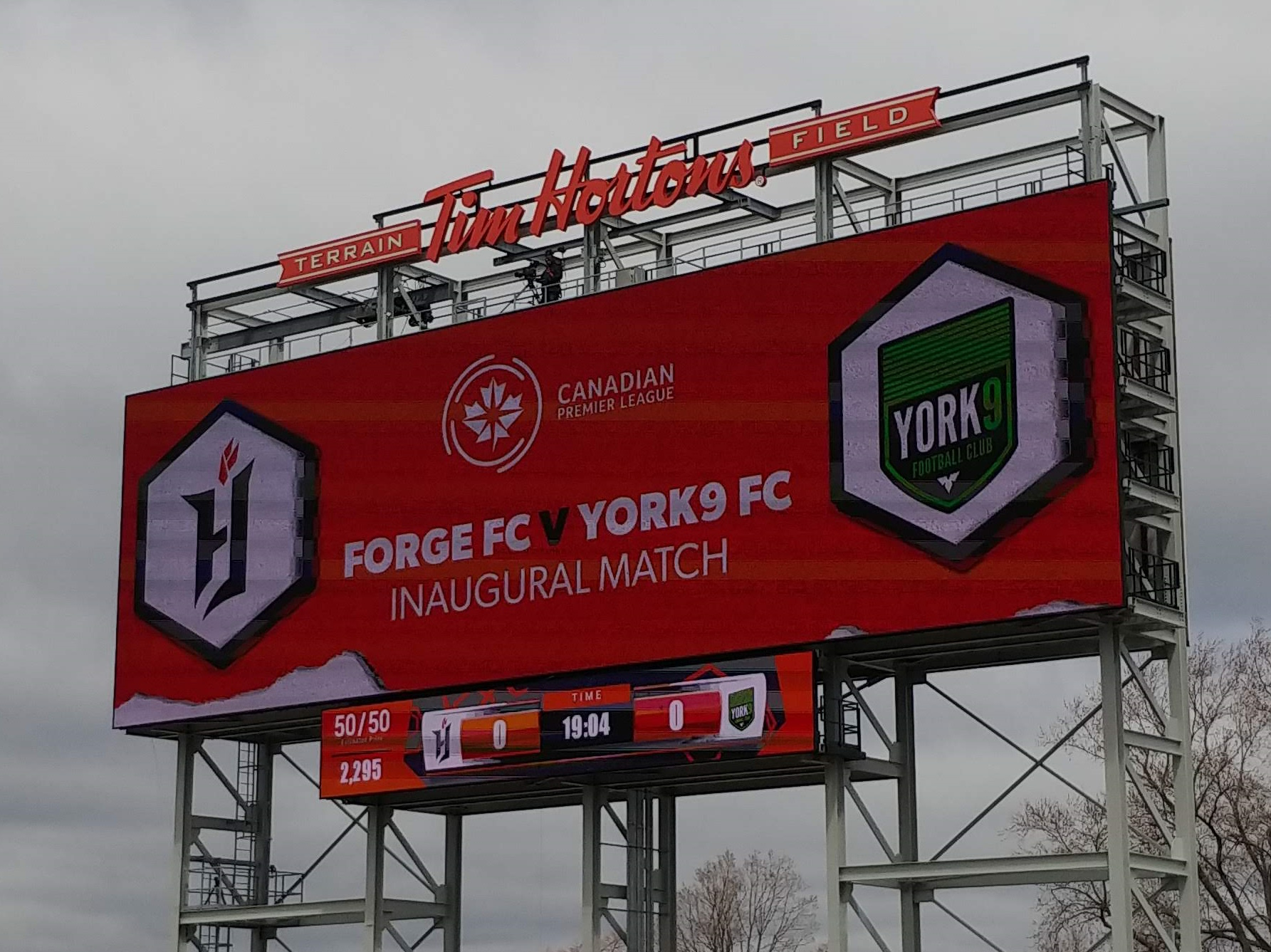
- Event: 2019 Canadian Premier League season
Forge FC	York9 FC
1	1
- Date: April 27, 2019
- Venue: Tim Hortons Field, Hamilton, Ontario
- Referee: David Gantar
- Attendance: 17,611
- Weather: Cloudy / windy 4 °C (39 °F); 70% humidity

The Canadian Premier League inaugural match was the first soccer match in the history of the Canadian Premier League (CPL). It was played April 27, 2019, in Hamilton, Ontario, before 17,611 fans between Forge FC and York9 FC (now known as Inter Toronto FC). It was the first match of the 905 Derby.

The match ended as a 1–1 draw. Ryan Telfer scored the CPL's first goal for York9 in the 3rd minute; Forge substitute Kadell Thomas equalized for Forge in the 78th minute.

== Background ==
The Canadian Premier League (CPL) was approved and sanctioned by the Canadian Soccer Association as a tier 1 league on May 6, 2017. On January 29, 2019, the CPL announced that its inaugural match would be contested at Tim Hortons Field in Hamilton, Ontario with Forge FC hosting York9 FC. The league dubbed this matchup the "905 Derby" due to both clubs being based in the "905" region (named for the 905 area code) of the Greater Toronto and Hamilton Area.

Forge owner Bob Young later announced a 'Soccer Unites Hamilton' initiative that saw Tim Hortons Field's capacity increased from its 10,016 capacity for regular Forge matches to beyond the stadium's full seated capacity of 23,218 seats for this match only, and that this match would be free to attend.

== Broadcasting ==
The match was broadcast on OneSoccer, which aired all matches of the 2019 season. It was also broadcast on CBC TV as the first of 10 CPL matches broadcast on the network that season, and streamed on CBCSports.ca as the first of 20 matches that season.

== Match ==
=== Summary ===
A few days before the match, CPL commissioner David Clanachan predicted 25,000 fans would take in the match. Ultimately, 17,611 fans were in attendance. Both teams started nine Canadian players; league rules required a minimum of only six each.

Ryan Telfer scored the CPL's first ever goal in the 3rd minute to give York9 the lead off of a through pass by captain Manny Aparicio. Forge's Emery Welshman nearly tied the match a few minutes later with a bicycle kick, but his shot went wide. In the 62nd minute, Forge captain Kyle Bekker notably ran through York9's Joseph Di Chiara with his elbow up, but escaped punishment on the play. Forge substitute Kadell Thomas eventually levelled the score at 1–1 in the 78th minute off of a feed from Welshman. Aparicio was later sent off in stoppage time for a second yellow card.

Forge outshot York 20–6, had six shots on target to York's one, and had 62% possession.

=== Details ===
April 27, 2019
1:00 pm ET

Forge FC	1–1	York9 FC
Thomas 78'	Report	Telfer 3'

Tim Hortons Field, Hamilton, Ontario
Attendance: 17,611
Referee: David Gantar

Forge	York9

GK	1	(Canada) Triston Henry
RB	2	(Canada) Jonathan Grant		(substituted off) 13'
CB	8	(Canada) Giuliano Frano	(yellow card) 68'
CB	4	(Canada) Dominic Samuel
LB	6	(Canada) Kwame Awuah
CM	3	(Senegal) Elimane Cissé
CM	13	(Sweden) Alexander Achinioti-Jönsson		(substituted off) 77'
RM	19	(Canada) Tristan Borges
AM	10	(Canada) Kyle Bekker (c)
LM	11	(Canada) Chris Nanco		(substituted off) 56'
CF	14	(Guyana) Emery Welshman
Substitutes:
GK	18	(Guyana) Quillan Roberts
MF	7	(Canada) David Choinière
FW	9	(Canada) Marcel Zajac		(substituted in) 77'
DF	16	(Canada) Klaidi Cela
FW	17	(Canada) Kadell Thomas		(substituted in) 56'
DF	21	(Cameroon) Bertrand Owundi		(substituted in) 13'
FW	23	(Canada) Anthony Novak
Manager: (Canada) Bobby Smyrniotis

GK	29	(Canada) Nathan Ingham
CB	5	(Saint Kitts and Nevis) Justin Springer
CB	13	(Canada) Luca Gasparotto
CB	2	(Canada) Daniel Gogarty
RW	19	(Canada) Kyle Porter
CM	8	(Canada) Joseph Di Chiara		(substituted off) 87'
CM	10	(Canada) Manny Aparicio (c)	(yellow card) 59' (yellow-red card) 90+5'
CM	23	(Japan) Wataru Murofushi		(substituted off) 67'
LW	18	(Trinidad and Tobago) Ryan Telfer
CF	12	(Sweden) Simon Adjei		(substituted off) 80'
CF	17	(Canada) Cyrus Rollocks
Substitutes:
GK	1	(Canada) Matt Silva
DF	3	(Canada) Morey Doner
FW	7	(Canada) Austin Ricci		(substituted in) 67'
MF	11	(Chinese Taipei) Emilio Estevez
FW	14	(Canada) Emmanuel Zambazis
DF	20	(Canada) Diyaeddine Abzi		(substituted in) 87'
MF	22	(Chile) Rodrigo Gattas		(substituted in) 80'
Manager: (Canada) Jim Brennan

== Aftermath ==
York9 captain Manny Aparicio picked up an automatic suspension for his red card. Forge captain Kyle Bekker was later suspended for two matches and fined an undisclosed amount for his elbow to Joseph Di Chiara that had gone unpenalized during the match. The first win in CPL history came the next day when Pacific FC defeated HFX Wanderers FC 1–0 in its home opener.

In league play, Forge finished second in the CPL's spring and fall seasons and went on to become the CPL's first champions by defeating Cavalry FC in the 2019 Canadian Premier League finals. York9 finished sixth in the CPL's spring season and third in the fall season.

With 17,611 fans in attendance, this match held the CPL attendance record for more than six years until it was broken on May 13, 2025 by Forge in a school day game against visitors Atlético Ottawa with a crowd of 17,971 in the stands.

== See also ==
- 2019 Forge FC season
- 2019 York9 FC season
