= 905 Derby =

Canadian Premier League soccer rivalry

- Location: Southern Ontario
- Teams: Forge FC; Inter Toronto FC
- First meeting: Forge 1–1 York9; CPL (April 27, 2019)
- Latest meeting: Forge 5–0 Inter Toronto; CPL (October 12, 2026)
- Stadiums: York Lions Stadium, Toronto; Hamilton Stadium, Hamilton

Statistics
- Total meetings: 34
- Most wins: Forge (21)
- All-time series: Forge: 21; Draw: 6 Inter Toronto: 7
- Largest victory: Forge 5–0 Inter Toronto; CPL (October 12, 2026)
- Longest win streak: Forge (4) (Aug 9, 2025–July 26, 2026)
- Longest unbeaten streak: Forge (15) (July 9, 2023–present)

Postseason history
- 2021 semi-finals: Forge won 3–1

The 905 Derby is a soccer rivalry between Canadian Premier League clubs, Forge FC and Inter Toronto FC, both based in Southern Ontario. The rivalry gets the "905" nickname from the 905 area code, which encompasses both Hamilton and York Region. Despite playing their home matches in Toronto (416 area code) since their inaugural season, Inter Toronto was originally known as York9 FC and had planned to relocate to York Region. Forge and Inter Toronto were the only Ontario-based teams in the inaugural season of the league and remain the two closest in proximity, with less than 65 kilometres (40 mi) separating their home stadiums.

== History ==
In January 2019, the Canadian Premier League announced that its inaugural match on April 27, 2019, would be between Forge FC and York9 FC at Tim Hortons Field, the first-ever staging of the 905 Derby. The match ended in a 1–1 draw.

On November 21, 2021, Forge hosted York United in the first CPL playoff meeting of the two clubs. Forge defeated York 3–1 to advance to the 2021 Canadian Premier League Final.

== Statistics ==
As of October 12, 2026

	Matches	Wins		Draws	Goals	
	Matches	Forge	Inter	Draws	Forge	Inter
Canadian Premier League	32	19	7	6	61	32
CPL playoffs	1	1	0	0	3	1
Canadian Championship	1	1	0	0	3	1
Total matches	34	21	7	6	67	34

== Results ==
Forge wins Draw York/Inter Toronto wins

Competition		Date	Home team	Result	Away team	Venue	Attendance	Recap	Series
2019 Canadian Premier League	Spring Season	April 27, 2019	Forge	1–1	York	Tim Hortons Field, Hamilton	17,611		Tied 0–1–0
2019 Canadian Premier League	Spring Season	May 25, 2019	York	0–2	Forge	York Lions Stadium, Toronto	4,260		FOR 1–1–0
2019 Canadian Premier League	Fall Season	September 8, 2019	Forge	2–1	York	Tim Hortons Field, Hamilton	5,267		FOR 2–1–0
2019 Canadian Premier League	Fall Season	October 6, 2019	Forge	1–0	York	Tim Hortons Field, Hamilton	4,864		FOR 3–1–0
2019 Canadian Premier League	Fall Season	October 12, 2019	York	4–0	Forge	York Lions Stadium, Toronto	2,314		FOR 3–1–1
2020 Canadian Premier League	First stage	August 26, 2020	York (Note: York was declared the 'home team' for administrative purposes, but this match was played at the Alumni Field in Charlottetown.)	3–2	Forge	Alumni Field, Charlottetown	0		FOR 3–1–2
2021 Canadian Premier League season		July 30, 2021	York	0–1	Forge	York Lions Stadium, Toronto	1,710		FOR 4–1–2
2021 Canadian Premier League season		August 4, 2021	Forge	0–1	York	Tim Hortons Field, Hamilton	3,712		FOR 4–1–3
2021 Canadian Premier League season		August 28, 2021	Forge	3–1	York	Tim Hortons Field, Hamilton	3,819		FOR 5–1–3
2021 Canadian Premier League season		September 11, 2021	Forge	0–2	York	Tim Hortons Field, Hamilton	3,449		FOR 5–1–4
2021 Canadian Premier League season		November 6, 2021	York	1–2	Forge	York Lions Stadium, Toronto	1,126		FOR 6–1–4
2021 Canadian Premier League season		November 9, 2021	York	1–3	Forge	York Lions Stadium, Toronto	756		FOR 7–1–4
2021 Canadian Premier League Playoffs		November 21, 2021	Forge	3–1	York	Tim Hortons Field, Hamilton	5,123		FOR 8–1–4
2022 Canadian Premier League		May 6, 2022	York	1–0	Forge	York Lions Stadium, Toronto	1,108		FOR 8–1–5
2022 Canadian Premier League		July 8, 2022	York	0–2	Forge	York Lions Stadium, Toronto	1,302		FOR 9–1–5
2022 Canadian Premier League		August 20, 2022	Forge	1–3	York	Tim Hortons Field, Hamilton	3,867		FOR 9–1–6
2022 Canadian Premier League		October 1, 2022	Forge	2–0	York	Tim Hortons Field, Hamilton	5,129		FOR 10–1–6
2023 Canadian Premier League		May 5, 2023	York	0–1	Forge	York Lions Stadium, Toronto	1,016		FOR 11–1–6
2023 Canadian Premier League		May 31, 2023	Forge	1–2	York	Tim Hortons Field, Hamilton	4,225		FOR 11–1–7
2023 Canadian Premier League		July 9, 2023	York	0–4	Forge	York Lions Stadium, Toronto	1,464		FOR 12–1–7
2023 Canadian Premier League		August 12, 2023	Forge	3–3	York	Tim Hortons Field, Hamilton	5,071		FOR 12–2–7
2024 Canadian Premier League		April 21, 2024	York	0–3	Forge	York Lions Stadium, Toronto	2,654		FOR 13–2–7
2024 Canadian Championship		May 1, 2024	Forge	3–1	York	Tim Hortons Field, Hamilton	2,471		FOR 14–2–7
2024 Canadian Premier League		June 1, 2024	Forge	3–0	York	Tim Hortons Field, Hamilton	5,271		FOR 15–2–7
2024 Canadian Premier League		August 23, 2024	York	0–0	Forge	York Lions Stadium, Toronto	1,824		FOR 15–3–7
2024 Canadian Premier League		September 28, 2024	Forge	2–0	York	Tim Hortons Field, Hamilton	6,376		FOR 16–3–7
2025 Canadian Premier League		April 27, 2025	York	2–2	Forge	York Lions Stadium, Toronto	1,679		FOR 16–4–7
2025 Canadian Premier League		June 29, 2025	Forge	2–2	York	Hamilton Stadium, Hamilton	6,621		FOR 16–5–7
2025 Canadian Premier League		August 9, 2025	York	1–2	Forge	York Lions Stadium, Toronto	1,681		FOR 17–5–7
2025 Canadian Premier League		October 18, 2025	Forge	3–0	York	Hamilton Stadium, Hamilton	6,521		FOR 18–5–7
2026 Canadian Premier League		June 7, 2026	Inter Toronto	1–4	Forge	York Lions Stadium, Toronto	3,154		FOR 19–5–7
2026 Canadian Premier League		July 26, 2026	Inter Toronto	1–3	Forge	York Lions Stadium, Toronto	2,985		FOR 20–5–7
2026 Canadian Premier League		September 5, 2026	Forge	1–1	York	Hamilton Stadium, Hamilton	4,172		FOR 20–6–7
2026 Canadian Premier League		October 12, 2026	Forge	5–0	York	Hamilton Stadium, Hamilton	4,710		FOR 21–6–7

== League ranking by season ==
P.	2019		2020		2021		2022		2023		2024		2025	
P.	Season	Finals	First	Final	Season	Playoffs	Season	Playoffs	Season	Playoffs	Season	Playoffs	Season	Playoffs
1		C		C	1			C		C	1		1	
2	2					RU	2		2			RU		
3	3		3											SF
4					4	SF					4	QF		QF
5			5						5	R1			5	
6							6							
7														
8														

== Records ==
=== Top goalscorers ===
As of October 12, 2026

Rank	Player	Club(s)	Nationality	Goals
1	**Tristan Borges**	Forge	Canada	10
2	Terran Campbell	Forge	Canada	7
3	David Choinière	Forge	Canada	6
3	**Brian Wright**	Forge; Inter Toronto	Canada	6
5	**Nana Ampomah**	Forge	Ghana	4
5	Woobens Pacius	Forge	Canada	4
7	Diyaeddine Abzi	Inter Toronto	Canada	3
7	**Molham Babouli**	Forge; Inter Toronto	Syria	3
7	Joseph Di Chiara	Inter Toronto	Canada	3
10	Alexander Achinioti-Jönsson	Forge	Sweden	2
10	**Béni Badibanga**	Inter Toronto; Forge	Belgium	2
10	**Kyle Bekker**	Forge	Canada	2
10	Jordan Hamilton	Forge	Canada	2
10	**Noah Jensen**	Forge	Canada	2
10	**Marko Jevremović**	Forge	Serbia	2
10	**Hoce Massunda**	Forge	Canada	2
10	Chris Nanco	Forge	Canada	2
10	**Ben Paton**	Forge	Canada	2
10	Álvaro Rivero	Inter Toronto	Spain	2

Players in bold are still active players with the team.

== Players who played for both clubs ==
=== Forge, then Inter Toronto ===
- (Syria) Molham Babouli (Note: Molham Babouli played for Forge from 2020–2021, York United from 2022–2024, and Forge again starting from 2025.)
- (Belgium) Béni Badibanga
- (Guyana) Jonathan Grant
- (Canada) Jace Kotsopoulos

=== Inter Toronto, then Forge ===
- (Syria) Molham Babouli
- (Canada) Brian Wright

== Discipline ==
List of sent-off players
Player	Club	Date	Minute	Type	Score	Final score
Manny Aparicio	York9 (A)	April 27, 2019	90+5'	(yellow card) (yellow-red card)	1–1	1–1
Dominick Zator	York United (H)	July 30, 2021	41'	Red card	0–1	0–1
Álvaro Rivero	York United (A)	August 4, 2021	64'	(yellow card) (yellow-red card)	0–1	0–1
Ashtone Morgan (Note: Morgan's red card suspension was withdrawn by Canada Soccer following an appeal.)	Forge (A)	May 5, 2023	90+1'	(red card)	0–1	0–1
Molham Babouli (Note: Molham Babouli was sent off while on the bench.)	York United (H)	July 9, 2023	85'	(red card)	0–4	0–4

== See also ==
- Canadian Classique
- Cavalry FC–FC Edmonton rivalry
- Cavalry FC–Forge FC rivalry
- Pacific FC–Vancouver FC rivalry
