= Ezequiel Carrasco =

Canadian soccer player (born 2002)

Personal information
- Full name: Ezequiel Enrique Carrasco Ayala
- Date of birth: September 11, 2002 (age 24)
- Place of birth: Toronto, Ontario, Canada
- Height: 1.88 m (6 ft 2 in)
- Position: Goalkeeper

Youth career
- Spartacus SC
- 2017: Glen Shields SC
- 2018–2019: Kleinburg Nobleton SC

College career
Years	Team	Apps	(Gls)
2021–	Humber Hawks	9	(0)

Senior career*
Years	Team	Apps	(Gls)
2020	York9	1	(0)
2023	Unionville Milliken SC	4	(0)
2024	Woodbridge Strikers	0	(0)
- * Club domestic league appearances and goals as of May 11, 2024

Ezequiel Enrique Carrasco Ayala (born September 11, 2002) is a Canadian soccer player who plays as a goalkeeper.

== Early life ==
Carrasco played youth soccer with Kleinburg Nobleton SC and spent time training with Chilean club Everton de Viña del Mar.

== Playing career ==
In March 2020, Carrasco went on trial with Canadian Premier League side York9 FC and participated their preseason training camp in Florida. In July 2020, he signed his first professional contract with the club ahead of the delayed 2020 season, at the age of seventeen. On August 29, 2020, he made his professional debut as a starter against HFX Wanderers FC after an injury to first-choice keeper Nathan Ingham. In November 2020, his option for the following season was declined by York.

In 2021, he began playing college soccer with Humber College. With Humber he was a 2021 CCAA National Champion and 2021 OCAA Provincial Champion.

In 2023, he played with Unionville Milliken SC in League1 Ontario.

== Career statistics ==
As of match played on May 21, 2024

Appearances and goals by club, season and competition
Club	Season	League			Playoffs		Domestic Cup		League Cup		Total	
Club	Season	Division	Apps	Goals	Apps	Goals	Apps	Goals	Apps	Goals	Apps	Goals
York9 FC	2020	Canadian Premier League	1	0	—		—		—		1	0
Unionville Milliken SC	2023	League1 Ontario	4	0	—		—		—		4	0
Woodbridge Strikers	2024	League1 Ontario Premier	0	0	—		—		1	0	1	0
Career total			5	0	0	0	0	0	1	0	6	0
