= Luca Gasparotto =

Canadian soccer player

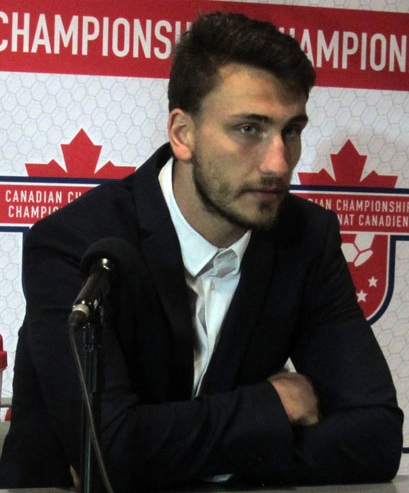
- Gasparotto in 2019

Personal information
- Full name: Luca Robert Gasparotto
- Date of birth: 9 March 1995 (age 31)
- Place of birth: North York, Ontario, Canada
- Height: 1.88 m (6 ft 2 in)
- Position: Centre-back

Youth career
- Ajax SC
- 2011: SC Toronto
- 2011–2013: Rangers

College career
| Years | Team | Apps | (Gls) |
| 2021–2022 | Humber Hawks | 5 | (2) |

Senior career*
| Years | Team | Apps | (Gls) |
| 2013–2016 | Rangers | 4 | (0) |
| 2013–2014 | → Stirling Albion (loan) | 3 | (0) |
| 2014–2015 | → Airdrieonians (loan) | 26 | (2) |
| 2015–2016 | → Greenock Morton (loan) | 20 | (0) |
| 2016–2018 | Falkirk | 34 | (1) |
| 2017 | → Greenock Morton (loan) | 4 | (0) |
| 2018 | Greenock Morton | 7 | (0) |
| 2019–2020 | York9 | 35 | (1) |

International career^{‡}
| 2011 | Canada U17 | 7 | (1) |
| 2015 | Canada U20 | 4 | (0) |
| 2015–2016 | Canada U23 | 7 | (0) |
- * Club domestic league appearances and goals as of 3 November 2020 ‡ National team caps and goals as of 13 August 2016

Luca Robert Gasparotto (born 9 March 1995) is a retired Canadian soccer player who played as a centre-back.

He has played for Canada at the youth level and has been called into the senior squad.

== Club career ==
=== Early career ===
Gasparotto began playing soccer with local club Ajax SC, coached by his father, and then moved to Canadian Soccer League side SC Toronto.

=== Rangers ===
In 2011, he went overseas to sign with Rangers and made his debut in 2013, coming on for Emílson Cribari in a 2–0 win over Clyde at Ibrox on 13 April 2013. Gasparotto made his second Rangers appearance in a 1–2 defeat to Peterhead at Ibrox on 20 April. Gasparotto made his first start for Rangers on the final day of the 2012–13 season in a 1–0 win over Berwick Rangers.

Gasparotto did not play for Rangers during the 2013–14 season but was loaned out to Stirling Albion. He joined Airdrieonians on 1 September 2014, initially until January, however, this was extended until the summer of 2015.

=== Greenock Morton ===
Following a serious injury to Frank McKeown, Gasparotto was signed by Greenock Morton on a short-term deal until January 2016. After impressing in his loan stint, Gasparotto's loan with Morton was extended to the end of the 2015–16 season. After the conclusion of his loan spell with Greenock Morton, Gasparotto announced that he would not be returning to Rangers for the 2016–17 Scottish Premiership season.

=== Falkirk ===
In June 2016, Gasparotto joined Scottish Championship side Falkirk.

=== Second spell at Morton ===
In November 2017, Gasparotto returned to Greenock Morton on an emergency loan deal until the start of January 2018, whereupon he signed a permanent deal until the end of the 2017–18 season. He was released at the end of the season.

=== York9 ===
On 14 February 2019, Gasparotto returned to Canada, signing with Canadian Premier League side York9. He made his first appearance for York9 in their inaugural match against Forge FC on 27 April 2019. He scored his first goal for the Nine Stripes in a Canadian Championship match against FC Edmonton on 5 June 2019. Gasparotto ended up playing every single minute for York9 in 2019, 28 league games and 6 in the Canadian Championship, the only CPL player to do so. On November 3, 2020, he announced his retirement from professional football, citing a desire to pursue a career outside of football.

=== Later career ===
In 2021, he began attending Humber College, where he joined the men's soccer team. In his debut season, Gasparotto was named to the 2021 OCAA League All-Star team. He also helped the Hawks win the national championship by defeating the Douglas Royals.

== International career ==
He was called into a training camp for the Canada national team in January 2014 whilst on loan at Stirling. Gasparotto was again called into the squad for a training camp in March 2015.

He has also played for Canada at U17 (including three games at the U17 World Cup in Mexico) and U20 level. In August 2015, Gasparotto was called up for 2018 FIFA World Cup qualifiers against Belize. In May 2016, Gasparotto was called to Canada's U23 national team for a pair of friendlies against Guyana and Grenada. He saw action in both matches.

Gasparotto was called up to the senior Canada squad for a 2018 FIFA World Cup qualifier against Belize in September 2015.

== Personal life ==
Gasparotto was born in North York, Ontario, to a Canadian mother and an Australian father. When he was one year old, his family moved to Ajax, Ontario. His father was born in Queanbeyan, New South Wales.

== Career statistics ==
As of match played 6 September 2020

Appearances and goals by club, season and competition
| Club | Season | League | | | National Cup | | League Cup | | Other | | Total | |
| Club | Season | Division | Apps | Goals | Apps | Goals | Apps | Goals | Apps | Goals | Apps | Goals |
|---|---|---|---|---|---|---|---|---|---|---|---|---|
| Rangers | 2012–13 | Scottish Third Division | 4 | 0 | 0 | 0 | 0 | 0 | 0 | 0 | 4 | 0 |
| Rangers | 2013–14 | Scottish League One | 0 | 0 | 0 | 0 | 0 | 0 | 0 | 0 | 0 | 0 |
| Rangers | 2014–15 | Scottish Championship | 0 | 0 | 0 | 0 | 0 | 0 | 0 | 0 | 0 | 0 |
| Rangers | 2015–16 | Scottish Championship | 0 | 0 | 0 | 0 | 0 | 0 | 0 | 0 | 0 | 0 |
| Rangers | Total | | 4 | 0 | 0 | 0 | 0 | 0 | 0 | 0 | 4 | 0 |
| Stirling Albion (loan) | 2013–14 | Scottish League Two | 3 | 0 | 0 | 0 | 0 | 0 | 0 | 0 | 3 | 0 |
| Airdrieonians (loan) | 2014–15 | Scottish League One | 26 | 2 | 1 | 0 | 0 | 0 | 0 | 0 | 27 | 2 |
| Greenock Morton (loan) | 2015–16 | Scottish Championship | 20 | 0 | 3 | 0 | 2 | 0 | 0 | 0 | 25 | 0 |
| Falkirk | 2016–17 | Scottish Championship | 29 | 0 | 0 | 0 | 4 | 1 | 3 (Note: One appearance in the Scottish Challenge Cup and two in the Premiership play-offs) | 0 | 36 | 1 |
| Falkirk | 2017–18 | Scottish Championship | 5 | 1 | 0 | 0 | 3 | 0 | 1 (Note: Appearance in the Scottish Challenge Cup) | 0 | 9 | 1 |
| Falkirk | Total | | 34 | 1 | 0 | 0 | 7 | 1 | 4 | 0 | 45 | 2 |
| Greenock Morton (loan) | 2017–18 | Scottish Championship | 4 | 0 | 0 | 0 | 0 | 0 | 0 | 0 | 4 | 0 |
| Greenock Morton | 2017–18 | Scottish Championship | 7 | 0 | 2 | 0 | 0 | 0 | 0 | 0 | 9 | 0 |
| Greenock Morton | Total | | 11 | 0 | 2 | 0 | 0 | 0 | 0 | 0 | 13 | 0 |
| York9 | 2019 | Canadian Premier League | 28 | 1 | 6 | 1 | — | — | 0 | 0 | 34 | 2 |
| York9 | 2020 | Canadian Premier League | 7 | 0 | 0 | 0 | — | — | 0 | 0 | 7 | 0 |
| York9 | Total | | 35 | 1 | 6 | 1 | 0 | 0 | 0 | 0 | 41 | 2 |
| Career total | | | 133 | 4 | 12 | 1 | 9 | 1 | 4 | 0 | 158 | 6 |

== Honours ==
Humber Hawks

- Canadian Collegiate Athletic Association: 2021
- Ontario Colleges Athletic Association: 2021–22

Individual

- Airdrieonians Young Player of the Year: 2014–15
- Airdrieonians Player of the Year: 2014–15
