= Kyle Porter =

Canadian soccer player (born 1990)

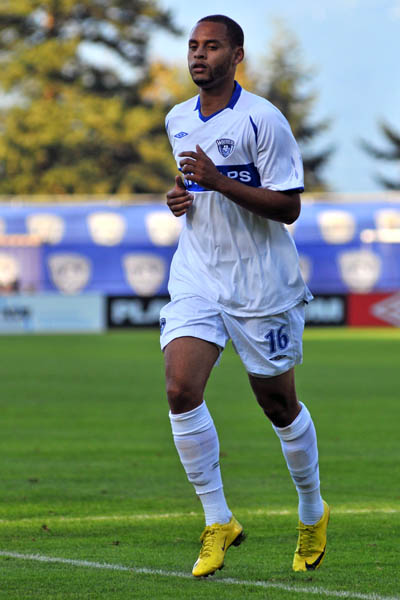
- Porter with the Vancouver Whitecaps in 2010

Personal information
- Full name: Kyle Neville Porter
- Date of birth: January 19, 1990 (age 36)
- Place of birth: Toronto, Ontario, Canada
- Height: 1.83 m (6 ft 0 in)
- Positions: Forward; right-back; midfielder

Youth career
- 1995–2002: Erin Mills SC
- 2003–2006: Mississauga Falcons
- 2007–2008: Vancouver Whitecaps

Senior career*
Years	Team	Apps	(Gls)
2008–2010	Whitecaps Residency	10	(5)
2008–2010	→ Energie Cottbus II (loan)	17	(2)
2010	Vancouver Whitecaps	5	(0)
2011–2012	FC Edmonton	48	(12)
2013–2014	D.C. United	32	(3)
2014	→ Richmond Kickers (loan)	6	(4)
2015	Atlanta Silverbacks	29	(2)
2016	Ottawa Fury	15	(0)
2016	→ Ottawa Fury Academy	3	(0)
2017	Tampa Bay Rowdies	11	(0)
2018	Ottawa Fury	3	(0)
2018	Tampa Bay Rowdies	5	(0)
2019–2020	York9	31	(3)
2021	FC Edmonton	19	(1)
2022	Blue Devils FC	19	(5)
2023	Scrosoppi FC	6	(0)

International career^{‡}
2006–2008	Canada U17	6	(0)
2009	Canada U20	4	(0)
2013–2015	Canada	7	(0)
- * Club domestic league appearances and goals as of June 11, 2023 ‡ National team caps and goals as of November 15, 2013

Kyle Neville Porter (born January 19, 1990) is a Canadian professional soccer player.

== Club career ==
=== Vancouver Whitecaps ===
Porter grew up in nearby Mississauga, Ontario and attended John Fraser Secondary School, St. Joan of Arc Catholic Secondary School and Burnaby Central Secondary School, and played club soccer for the Erin Mills Soccer Club and the Mississauga Falcons before joining the Vancouver Whitecaps FC Academy program in 2007.

He appeared in friendly games with the Residency team during tours of Germany and played in the prestigious Dallas Cup in 2007. Porter also played with the Vancouver Whitecaps Residency team in its inaugural season in the USL Premier Development League in 2008.

==== Loan to Energie Cottbus ====
Porter was loaned to Energie Cottbus after impressing the German club during a one-month trial in the summer of 2008, and subsequently played for Cottbus' U-19 Junior Bundesliga side. He was promoted to the Cottbus U-23 reserve squad that played in Germany's fourth-tier Regionalliga Nord during the second half of the 2008–2009 season, making five appearances and scoring one goal. He continued with Cottbus II in the 2009–2010 season, making 11 appearances and scoring one goal.

=== Return from loan ===
Porter returned to the Vancouver Whitecaps in mid-2010, and made his debut as a substitute on October 2, 2010, in Vancouver's last game of the 2010 USSFD2 regular season, a 2–2 tie with the Portland Timbers. Porter delivered the cross for the equalizing goal in the match.

Porter played with the MLS Whitecaps during the 2011 pre-season, he was offered a contract by the club but both parties could not agree to terms.

=== FC Edmonton ===
He then signed with FC Edmonton of the North American Soccer League in April 2011. He made his debut for Edmonton on April 27, 2011, in the team's 2011 Canadian Championship match with Toronto FC. Porter was under contract with FC Edmonton for the 2012 season.

=== D.C. United ===
After an extended trial period, Porter signed with Major League Soccer's D.C. United on February 23, 2013. Since joining United, he has become a regular starter. On May 19, 2013, Porter scored his first goal for United, off a cross from Chris Pontius against Sporting Kansas City. The match ended in a 1–1 draw. Porter's option was declined by DC United at the close of the 2014 season. In total, he played 32 games, scored 3 goals, and made one assist for DC in MLS.

=== Atlanta Silverbacks ===
Porter signed with the Atlanta Silverbacks of the NASL on March 3, 2015. He made his debut against Indy Eleven in Atlanta's season opener on April 4.

=== Ottawa Fury ===
In January 2016 Porter made his return to Canada, signing with Ottawa Fury FC. In December 2016, the Fury announced that Porter would not return to the team as the club moved to USL in 2017.

=== Tampa Bay Rowdies ===
In March 2017, Porter signed with the Tampa Bay Rowdies in the USL.

=== Return to Ottawa ===
After a two-week trial, Porter signed for a second spell with the Ottawa Fury on 8 February 2018. He was released by the club in July 2018 after making three appearances.

=== Return to Tampa Bay ===
On July 13, 2018, Porter signed for a second spell with the Tampa Bay Rowdies. He made five appearances for Tampa that year.

=== York9 ===
On November 29, 2018, Porter signed with York9 FC of the Canadian Premier League. He made his debut for York9 in their inaugural match against Forge FC on April 27, 2019. That year, he made 25 league appearances, scoring two goals, and made six appearances in the Canadian Championship. On December 9, 2019, Porter re-signed with York for 2020. During the shortened 2020 season, he made six appearances, scoring one goal.

=== Return to FC Edmonton ===
On December 23, 2020, Porter returned to FC Edmonton for the 2021 season. In January 2022, Porter departed the club.

=== Blue Devils FC ===
In 2022, he played for Blue Devils FC in League1 Ontario. On August 14, he scored a hat trick against Unionville Milliken SC. In December 2022, he retired from professional soccer.

=== Scrosoppi ===
In 2023, he continued to play at the semi-professional level in League1 Ontario with Scrosoppi FC.

== International career ==
Porter has represented Canada at U-17, and U-20 levels. He appeared in all four Group B matches of CONCACAF final round qualifying for the 2007 FIFA U-17 World Cup, and played two games for the Canada U-20's at the 2009 CONCACAF U-20 Championship.

Porter made his senior team debut on January 26, 2013, in a friendly against Denmark as a second half sub for Russell Teibert, the game ended as a 4–0 defeat. On July 6, Porter was named to the 2013 CONCACAF Gold Cup roster as a replacement for Nana Attakora who sustained an injury. Porter was not initially supposed to be an active member of the roster, but three days later Randy Edwini-Bonsu was forced to leave the Gold Cup due to injury and Simeon Jackson due to a club commitment which forced him to join the team before its second match against Mexico.

== Personal life ==
Porter's father was born in Jamaica and his mother was born in Canada. He speaks English and picked up some German while playing in Germany. His wife's name is Rachel Michelle Rosart. His son's name is Kyden Anthony Neville Porter.

== Career statistics ==
As of June 11, 2023

Club statistics
Club	Season	League			Playoffs		National Cup (Note: Includes appearances in the Canadian Championship and U.S. Open Cup.)		Continental (Note: Includes appearances in CONCACAF Champions League.)		Total	
Club	Season	Division	Apps	Goals	Apps	Goals	Apps	Goals	Apps	Goals	Apps	Goals
Energie Cottbus II (loan)	2008–09	Regionalliga	5	1	—		—		—		5	1
Energie Cottbus II (loan)	2009–10	NOFV-Oberliga Nord	12	1	—		—		—		12	1
Energie Cottbus II (loan)	Total		17	2	0	0	0	0	0	0	17	2
Vancouver Whitecaps	2010	USSF D2 Pro League	5	0	0	0	0	0	—		5	0
FC Edmonton	2011	North American Soccer League	24	7	1	0	2	0	—		27	7
FC Edmonton	2012	North American Soccer League	24	5	—		2	0	—		26	5
FC Edmonton	Total		48	12	1	0	4	0	0	0	53	12
D.C. United	2013	Major League Soccer	27	3	—		3	0	—		30	3
D.C. United	2014	Major League Soccer	5	0	0	0	1	0	4	0	10	0
D.C. United	Total		32	3	0	0	4	0	4	0	40	3
Richmond Kickers (loan)	2014	USL Pro	6	4	1	0	0	0	—		7	4
Atlanta Silverbacks	2015	North American Soccer League	29	2	—		2	0	—		31	2
Ottawa Fury	2016	North American Soccer League	15	0	—		3	0	—		18	0
Ottawa Fury Academy	2016	Première Ligue de soccer du Québec	3	0	—		—		0	0	3	0
Tampa Bay Rowdies	2017	United Soccer League	11	0	0	0	1	1	—		12	1
Ottawa Fury	2018	United Soccer League	3	0	—		0	0	—		3	0
Tampa Bay Rowdies	2018	United Soccer League	5	0	—		0	0	—		5	0
York9	2019	Canadian Premier League	25	2	—		6	0	—		31	2
York9	2020	Canadian Premier League	6	1	—		—		—		6	1
York9	Total		31	3	0	0	6	0	0	0	37	3
FC Edmonton	2021	Canadian Premier League	19	1	—		1	0	—		20	1
Blue Devils FC	2022	League1 Ontario	19	5	2	0	—		—		21	5
Scrosoppi FC	2023	League1 Ontario	6	0	0	0	—		—		6	0
Career total			249	32	4	0	21	1	4	0	278	35

== Honours ==
D.C. United

- U.S. Open Cup: 2013
