= Manny Aparicio =

Canadian soccer player (born 1995)

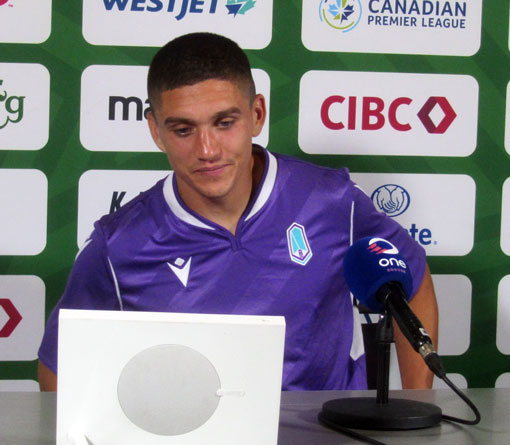
- Aparicio in 2023

Personal information
- Full name: Manuel Aparicio
- Date of birth: September 17, 1995 (age 31)
- Place of birth: Buenos Aires, Argentina
- Height: 1.74 m (5 ft 9 in)
- Position: Midfielder

Team information
- Current team: Atlético Ottawa
- Number: 34

Youth career
- 2004–2008: East York
- 2009: Unionville Milliken SC
- 2010–2013: Toronto FC

Senior career*
Years	Team	Apps	(Gls)
2013–2015	Toronto FC	0	(0)
2014	→ Wilmington Hammerheads (loan)	19	(4)
2015	Toronto FC II	21	(3)
2016–2017	Órdenes	30	(5)
2017–2018	Izarra	20	(1)
2018	San Roque Lepe	11	(2)
2019–2020	York9	31	(5)
2021–2023	Pacific FC	61	(10)
2024–	Atlético Ottawa	55	(7)

International career^{‡}
2013	Canada U18	10	(2)
2014–2015	Canada U20	18	(1)
2015–2017	Canada U23	10	(2)
2014	Canada	1	(0)
- * Club domestic league appearances and goals as of October 28, 2025 ‡ National team caps and goals as of 00:54, March 29, 2017 (UTC)

Manuel "Manny" Aparicio (born September 17, 1995) is a professional soccer player who plays as a midfielder for Canadian Premier League club Atlético Ottawa. Born in Argentina, he played for the Canada national team.

== Early life ==
Aparicio was born in Buenos Aires, Argentina, and moved to Toronto, Canada, with his family in 2004. He began his youth career with East York Dragons before switching to Unionville Milliken SC, where the talented youngster was scouted and recruited to the TFC Academy that competed in the Canadian Soccer League.

== Club career ==
=== Toronto FC ===
Aparicio signed his first professional contract in 2013 at the age of 17 years old, becoming the eighth TFC Academy graduate to the professional team. He appeared in two midseason friendlies for Toronto FC in 2015, against English Premier League teams Manchester City and Sunderland.

==== Loan to Wilmington ====
He was loaned out in early 2014 to USL PRO side Wilmington Hammerheads after the two clubs formed a partnership. He was loaned alongside Quillan Roberts and Daniel Lovitz. Aparicio made his debut for Wilmington in the season opener on April 5, 2014, against the Harrisburg City Islanders.

==== Loan to Toronto FC II ====
Aparicio was loaned to Toronto FC II on March 20, 2015. He made his debut against the Charleston Battery on March 21.

Toronto FC announced on December 1, 2015, that Aparicio would not be returning to the team for the 2016 MLS Season.

=== Órdenes ===
On August 15, 2016, Aparicio signed with SD Órdenes on a one-year deal, making 30 league appearances and scoring four goals.

=== Izarra ===
In summer 2017, Aparicio signed with Spanish Segunda División B club CD Izarra and made 20 league appearances that season.

=== San Roque ===
In summer 2018, Aparicio signed with Spanish Tercera División club CD San Roque de Lepe and made 11 appearances, scoring one goal.

=== York9 ===
On January 14, 2019, Aparicio signed with Canadian Premier League club York9. The 2019 season was the first in both Canadian Premier League and York9 FC history, and before it started Aparicio was named the first-ever captain for York9. Aparicio took part in the Canadian Premier League's first game in history, a 1–1 draw in Hamilton, Ontario against Forge FC and assisted the first ever Canadian Premier League goal in the third minute of the match. However he also became the first player to be red carded in the Canadian Premier League, after receiving a second caution for a deliberate handball in second-half stoppage time.

=== Pacific FC ===
On 6 November 2020, Aparicio signed with fellow CPL side Pacific FC.

He officially left the club in January 2024, having scored ten goals and 11 assists in 78 appearances between all competitions for the club.

=== Atlético Ottawa ===
On March 22, 2024, Atlético Ottawa announced the signing of the Toronto-raised midfielder, ahead of the 2024 Canadian Premier League season. Aparicio was part of the squad which won Ottawa's first CPL title, providing the assist for the winning goal in extra time during the final on November 9, 2025. on December 23, 2025, it was announced that he had signed a two-year contract extension with the club.

== International career ==
=== Youth ===
Aparicio has represented Canada at youth level. He received his first senior team experience when Canada coach Benito Floro included him in a camp the team had in Sunrise, Florida in January 2014. He was later a part of the U-20 squad that participated in the 2014 Milk Cup. He represented Canada during the Pan American games in 2015. In May 2016, Aparicio was called to Canada's U23 national team for a pair of friendlies against Guyana and Grenada. He saw action in both matches.

=== Senior ===
Aparicio was recalled to the senior team for a friendly against Colombia in October 2014, where he made his debut for the national team.

== Honours ==
Atlético Ottawa

- Canadian Premier League: 2025

Pacific FC

- Canadian Premier League: 2021

== Career statistics ==
=== Club ===
As of match played November 9, 2025

Appearances and goals by club, season and competition
Club	League	Season	League		Playoffs		Domestic Cup		Continental		Total	
Club	League	Season	Apps	Goals	Apps	Goals	Apps	Goals	Apps	Goals	Apps	Goals
Toronto FC	Major League Soccer	2013	1	0	—		1	0	—		0	0
Toronto FC	Major League Soccer	2014	2	0	—		2	0	—		0	0
Toronto FC	Major League Soccer	2015	0	0	—		0	0	—		0	0
Toronto FC	Total		0	0	0	0	0	0	0	0	0	0
Wilmington Hammerheads (loan)	USL Pro	2014	19	3	1	0	0	0	—		20	3
Toronto FC II (loan)	USL Pro	2015	21	2	—		—		—		21	2
Órdenes	Tercera División	2016–17	30	4	—		0	0	—		30	5
Izarra	Segunda División B	2017–18	20	0	—		0	0	—		20	1
San Roque Lepe	Tercera División	2018–19	11	1	—		0	0	—		11	2
York9 FC	Canadian Premier League	2019	25	2	—		6	0	—		31	2
York9 FC	Canadian Premier League	2020	6	2	—		—		—		6	3
York9 FC	Total		31	4	0	0	6	0	0	0	37	5
Pacific FC	Canadian Premier League	2021	20	3	2	0	3	1	—		25	4
Pacific FC	Canadian Premier League	2022	17	2	2	0	0	0	4	0	21	3
Pacific FC	Canadian Premier League	2023	24	4	3	0	3	0	0	0	30	4
Pacific FC	Total		61	9	7	0	6	1	4	0	76	10
Atlético Ottawa	Canadian Premier League	2024	27	5	2	0	3	0	—		32	5
Atlético Ottawa	Canadian Premier League	2025	28	1	2	0	5	0	—		35	2
Atlético Ottawa	Total		55	6	4	0	8	0	0	0	67	7
Career totals			248	29	12	0	23	1	4	0	287	30

=== International ===
As of match played October 14, 2014

Canada
Year	Apps	Goals
2014	1	0
Total	1	0
