= Nathan Ingham =

Canadian soccer player (born 1993)

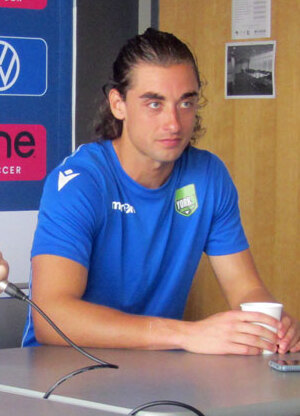
- Ingham in 2019

Personal information
- Date of birth: June 27, 1993 (age 33)
- Place of birth: Newmarket, Ontario, Canada
- Height: 1.88 m (6 ft 2 in)
- Position: Goalkeeper

Team information
- Current team: Cavalry FC

Youth career
- Markham SC
- Ajax SC
- 2012: Toronto FC

College career
Years	Team	Apps	(Gls)
2011–2015	Florida Gulf Coast Eagles	63	(0)

Senior career*
Years	Team	Apps	(Gls)
2012	TFC Academy		
2013–2015	K–W United	30	(0)
2016–2017	FC Edmonton	8	(0)
2016	→ Toronto FC II (loan)	2	(0)
2018	Calgary Foothills FC	5	(0)
2018	Pittsburgh Riverhounds	0	(0)
2019–2021	York United	53	(0)
2022–2025	Atlético Ottawa	95	(0)
2026–	Cavalry FC	27	(0)
- * Club domestic league appearances and goals as of October 25, 2026

Nathan Ingham (born June 27, 1993) is a Canadian professional soccer player who plays as a goalkeeper for Cavalry FC in the Canadian Premier League.

== Early life ==
Born in Newmarket, Ontario, Ingham grew up in Keswick, Ontario. He began playing youth soccer at age ten with Markham SC. He later played with Ajax SC.

== College career ==
In February 2011, he committed to attend Florida Gulf Coast University to play for the men's soccer team in the fall. On October 21, 2011, he made his collegiate debut in a victory over the Lipscomb Bisons. He helped the team win the ASUN Conference title in his freshman year and was named the A-Sun Tournament MVP and to the All-Tournament Team. In November 2012, he was named the ASUN Defensive Player of the Week. In 2013, he suffered a season-ending injury and utilized a redshirt season to maintain a year of eligibility.

In 2014, he was named the ASUN Defensive Player of the Week twice. That season, he helped them win the ASUN title for a third time, and was once again named the A-Sun Tournament MVP and to the All-Tournament Team. In addition, he was also named to the All-ASUN Conference First Team.

In his senior season, he was named the ASUN Defensive Player of the Week three times, tying the school record for the most career weekly conference honours with six. He was also named to the College Soccer News National Team of the Week in November. He was also named the ASUN Goalkeeper of the Year, named to the All-ASUN First Team, and the All-Southeast Region Third Team. He finished his career as the school's all-time goals-against average leader (0.98) and the all-time ASUN career shutout leader with 26.

== Club career ==
In the summer of 2012 in the college offseason, he played with Toronto FC's senior academy in the Canadian Soccer League's first division. From 2013 to 2015, he played with K–W United in the Premier Development League. In 2015, he won the PDL Championship with the club and was named Man of the Match in the championship final, in which he saved a penalty against the New York Red Bulls U-23.

In January 2016, he signed a professional contract with NASL side FC Edmonton. In August 2016, he went on loan with USL club Toronto FC II. After initially serving as Edmonton's backup, he took over the starting job midway through the 2017 season. He made his debut for Edmonton on June 7, 2017, in a 4-2 victory over the New York Cosmos, also stopping a penalty kick in the match. In late June 2017, he won the NASL's play of the week honour for his "triple save" in a 1-0 victory over the San Francisco Deltas.

In 2018, he returned to the PDL with Calgary Foothills FC.

In July 2018, he signed a contract with the Pittsburgh Riverhounds in the USL for the remainder of the 2018 season, with an option for 2019.

In April 2019, Ingham signed with Canadian Premier League side York9 (later renamed York United). On April 27, 2019, he made his debut for York9, in the CPL's inaugural match against Forge FC. In his first season, he led the league in saves with 89 and was nominated for the league's Golden Glove award. He was also named to the Spring season Best XI. After the season, he re-signed with the club for the 2020 season. The extension made him the highest paid player. In December 2021, he was ranked #40 in a list of the CPL's Top 50 All-Time players by the league. After the 2021 season, he departed the club.

In January 2022, he signed a two-year contract with Atlético Ottawa. In 2022, he helped Ottawa win the regular season title and finish as playoff finalists, and he was nominated for the CPL Goalkeeper of the Year that season. After the season, he went on a trial/training stint with Liga MX side Atlético San Luis. In August 2023, he was named the CPL Goalkeeper of the Month. In November 2023, he extended his contract with the club through the 2025 season.

In January 2026, he signed with Cavalry FC through the 2028 season.

== International career ==
In December 2011, Ingham attended a camp with the Canada U20 team. In November 2012, he was again invited to the same camp.

== Personal life ==
Ingham previously worked as a chef and also works as a bartender during the season.

== Career statistics ==
As of match played November 21, 2026

Appearances and goals by club, season and competition
Club	Season	League			Playoffs		National Cup		Total	
Club	Season	Division	Apps	Goals	Apps	Goals	Apps	Goals	Apps	Goals
FC Edmonton	2016	North American Soccer League	0	0	0	0	0	0	0	0
FC Edmonton	2017	North American Soccer League	8	0	—		0	0	8	0
FC Edmonton	Total		8	0	0	0	0	0	8	0
Toronto FC II (loan)	2016	USL	2	0	—		—		2	0
Calgary Foothills	2018	Premier Development League	5	0	3	0	—		8	0
York United	2019	Canadian Premier League	26	0	—		6	0	32	0
York United	2020	Canadian Premier League	6	0	—		—		6	0
York United	2021	Canadian Premier League	21	0	1	0	2	0	24	0
York United	Total		53	0	1	0	8	0	62	0
Atlético Ottawa	2022	Canadian Premier League	25	0	3	0	1	0	29	0
Atlético Ottawa	2023	Canadian Premier League	22	0	—		1	0	23	0
Atlético Ottawa	2024	Canadian Premier League	20	0	2	0	0	0	22	0
Atlético Ottawa	2025	Canadian Premier League	28	0	2	0	5	0	35	0
Atlético Ottawa	Total		95	0	7	0	7	0	109	0
Cavalry FC	2026	CPL	27	0	3	0	3	0	33	0
Career total			190	0	14	0	18	0	222	0

== Honours ==
Atlético Ottawa

- CPL Shield: 2022
- Canadian Premier League: 2025
