= Steven Furlano =

Canadian soccer player (born 1998)

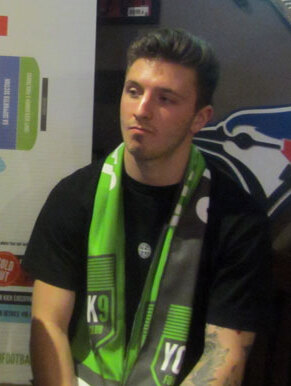
- Furlano in 2019

Personal information
- Full name: Steven Vincent Gordon Sonny Furlano
- Date of birth: February 6, 1998 (age 28)
- Place of birth: Barrie, Ontario, Canada
- Height: 1.70 m (5 ft 7 in)
- Position: Midfielder

Youth career
- Barrie SC
- 2013–2016: Toronto FC

Senior career*
Years	Team	Apps	(Gls)
2015–2017	Toronto FC III	41	(4)
2016–2017	Toronto FC II	4	(0)
2018	Darby FC	3	(1)
2018	Alliance United	11	(8)
2019	York9 FC	15	(0)
- * Club domestic league appearances and goals as of October 19, 2019

Steven Vincent Gordon Sonny Furlano (born February 6, 1998) is a Canadian soccer player who plays as a midfielder.

== Club career ==
=== Early career ===
Furlano began playing football at the age of five at Barrie SC. He later attended St. Peter’s Secondary School and Bill Crothers Secondary School.

=== Toronto FC ===
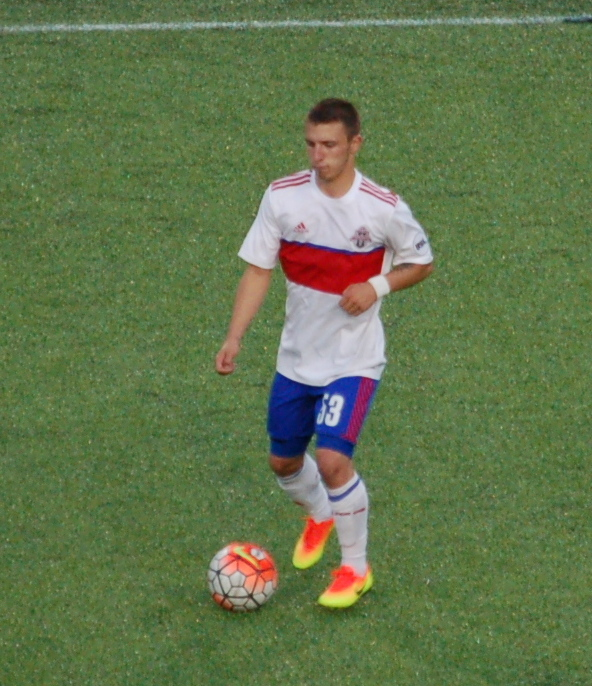
Furlano playing for Toronto FC II in 2016

In 2013, he joined the Toronto FC Academy, and joined Toronto FC II, Toronto FC's reserve team, ahead of the 2016 USL season. He made his debut as a substitute on May 25, 2016, coming off the bench for the final seven minutes in a 2-1 defeat to Pittsburgh Riverhounds.

=== Alliance United ===
In 2018, Furlano played for League1 Ontario side Alliance United, scoring nine goals in fourteen appearances in league play and made another two appearances in the playoffs.

=== York9 FC ===
On December 20, 2018, Furlano signed his first professional contract with Canadian Premier League side York9 FC. Furlano made fifteen league appearances and three in the Canadian Championship that season. On November 15, 2019, the club announced that Furlano would not be returning for the 2020 season.

== International career ==
Furlano first featured in the Canadian youth program in 2013, and despite being named in three Under-15 camps is yet to make his international debut at youth or senior level. He was named to the U15 national team for the 2013 Copa de México de Naciones.

== Career statistics ==
As of July 6, 2019

Club	Season	League	League		Playoffs		Domestic Cup		Continental		Total	
Club	Season	League	Apps	Goals	Apps	Goals	Apps	Goals	Apps	Goals	Apps	Goals
Toronto FC III	2015	PDL	3	0	—		—		—		3	0
Toronto FC III	2016	PDL	11	0	—		—		—		11	0
Toronto FC III	2016	League1 Ontario	8	2	—		—		—		8	2
Toronto FC III	2017	League1 Ontario	19	2	—		—		—		19	2
Toronto FC III	Total		41	4	0	0	0	0	0	0	41	4
Toronto FC II	2016	USL	4	0	—		—		—		4	0
Darby FC	2018	League1 Ontario	3	1	—		—		—		3	1
Alliance United	2018	League1 Ontario	11	8	2	0	—		—		13	8
York9 FC	2019	CPL	5	0	—		3	0	—		8	0
Career total			64	13	2	0	3	0	0	0	69	13
