= Rodrigo Gattas =

Chilean footballer (born 1991)

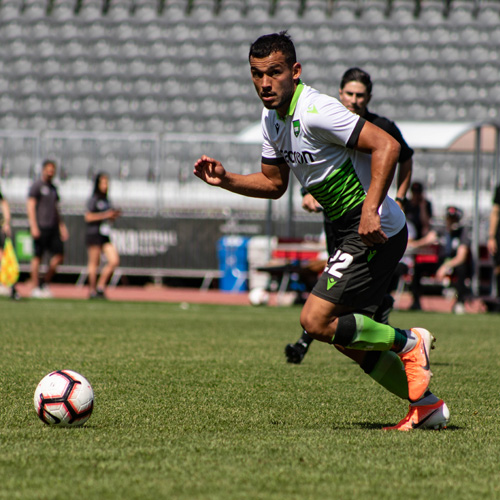
- Gattas playing for York9 in 2019

Personal information
- Full name: Rodrigo Pablo Gattas Bertoni
- Date of birth: 2 December 1991 (age 34)
- Place of birth: Santiago, Chile
- Height: 1.73 m (5 ft 8 in)
- Position: Forward

Team information
- Current team: Concón National
- Number: 22

Youth career
- –2009: Unión Española

Senior career*
Years	Team	Apps	(Gls)
2009–2015	Unión Española	19	(2)
2012–2013	Unión Española B	39	(19)
2013–2014	→ Unión La Calera (loan)	33	(7)
2014–2015	→ Cobreloa (loan)	13	(0)
2015	Cobresal	2	(0)
2016	Santiago Morning	10	(3)
2016–2017	Hilal Al-Quds		
2017	Cerro	6	(0)
2018	Rangers	14	(4)
2019	Deportes Santa Cruz	8	(1)
2019	York9	28	(9)
2020	Gabala	4	(0)
2020–2021	Montijo	36	(7)
2022	Fernández Vial	8	(0)
2022–2024	San Antonio Unido	23	(13)
2025–	Concón National	0	(0)

International career^{‡}
2009	Chile U20	1	(0)
- * Club domestic league appearances and goals as of 19 July 2023 ‡ National team caps and goals as of 26 April 2019

Rodrigo Pablo Gattas Bertoni (born 2 December 1991) is a Chilean professional footballer who plays as a forward for Segunda División Profesional de Chile club Concón National.

== Club career ==
=== Hilal Al-Quds ===
In summer 2016, Gattas signed with West Bank Premier League side Hilal Al-Quds. He once described his time in Palestine as "Beautiful".

=== Cerro ===
On 22 February 2017, Gattas returned to South America, signing with Uruguayan Segunda División side Cerro. He made his debut as a substitute on 7 May in a 2–1 win against Peñarol. Gattas went on to make a total of six appearances for Cerro that season.

=== Rangers Talca ===
In January 2018, Gattas returned to Chile, signing with Chilean Primera B side Rangers de Talca. That season, he made fourteen league appearances for Rangers, including twelve starts, and scored four goals. He also made another four appearances in the Copa Chile.

=== Santa Cruz ===
In January 2019, Gattas signed with Deportes Santa Cruz. He scored one goal in eight appearances that season before leaving the club in late April to pursue an opportunity in North America.

=== York9 ===
On 26 April 2019, Gattas signed with Canadian Premier League side York9. He made his debut for York9 the next day, coming on as a substitute in the first ever Canadian Premier League game, a 1–1 draw with Forge FC. Gattas scored his first goal for York9 against Pacific FC on 18 May 2019, netting a penalty in a 2–2 draw. On 27 July 2019, Gattas scored the first hat-trick in Canadian Premier League history in a 6–2 win over HFX Wanderers FC.

=== Gabala ===
On 11 February 2020, Gattas signed a 1.5-year contract with Azerbaijan Premier League side Gabala.

=== Montijo ===
On 28 November 2020, Gattas signed with Spanish Tercera División side UD Montijo.

=== San Antonio Unido ===
In July 2022, he joined San Antonio Unido in the Segunda División Profesional de Chile.

== International career ==
Gattas has previously received call-ups to the Palestinian national team, but has yet to earn a cap. In an interview in September 2019, Gattas indicated that he was no longer inclined to play for Palestine and would refuse any future call-ups.

== Career statistics ==
As of match played 27 December 2021

Club statistics
Club	Season	League			Cup		Continental		Other		Total	
Club	Season	Division	Apps	Goals	Apps	Goals	Apps	Goals	Apps	Goals	Apps	Goals
Unión Española	2009	Chilean Primera División	3	0	0	0	–		–		3	0
Unión Española	2010	Chilean Primera División	1	0	0	0	–		–		1	0
Unión Española	2011	Chilean Primera División	7	0	0	0	0	0	–		7	0
Unión Española	2012	Chilean Primera División	3	1	5	3	–		–		8	4
Unión Española	2013	Chilean Primera División	5	1	0	0	–		–		14	0
Unión Española	Total		19	2	5	3	0	0	0	0	24	5
Unión Española II	2012	Chilean Segunda División	23	13	–		–		–		23	13
Unión Española II	2013	Chilean Segunda División	16	6	–		–		–		16	6
Unión Española II	Total		39	19	0	0	0	0	0	0	39	19
Unión La Calera (loan)	2013–14	Chilean Primera División	33	7	3	1	–		–		36	8
Cobreloa (loan)	2014–15	Chilean Primera División	13	0	1	0	–		–		14	0
Cobresal	2015–16	Chilean Primera División	2	0	2	0	–		–		4	0
Santiago Morning	2015–16	Chilean Primera B	10	3	0	0	–		–		10	3
Hilal Al-Quds	2016–17	West Bank Premier League					–		–			
Cerro	2017	Uruguayan Primera División	6	0	–		–		–		6	0
Rangers Talca	2018	Chilean Primera B	14	4	4	0	–		–		18	4
Santa Cruz	2019	Chilean Primera B	8	1	0	0	–		–		8	1
York9	2019	Canadian Premier League	28	9	6	2	–		–		34	11
Gabala	2019–20	Azerbaijan Premier League	2	0	0	0	0	0	–		2	0
Gabala	2020–21	Azerbaijan Premier League	2	0	0	0	–		–		2	0
Gabala	Total		4	0	0	0	0	0	0	0	4	0
Montijo	2020–21	Tercera División	20	6	–		–		0	0	20	6
Montijo	2021–22	Segunda División RFEF	16	1	1	0	–		0	0	17	1
Montijo	Total		36	7	1	0	0	0	0	0	37	7
Career total			212	52	22	6	0	0	0	0	234	58
