= Joseph Di Chiara =

Canadian soccer player (born 1992)

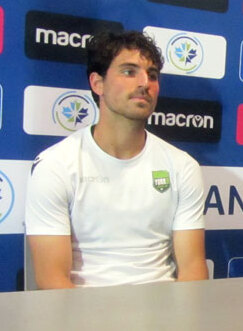
- Di Chiara in 2019

Personal information
- Full name: Joseph William Anthony Di Chiara
- Date of birth: January 30, 1992 (age 34)
- Place of birth: Toronto, Canada
- Height: 1.85 m (6 ft 1 in)
- Position: Midfielder

Team information
- Current team: Vaughan Azzurri

Youth career
- Glen Shields
- Spartacus SC

Senior career*
Years	Team	Apps	(Gls)
2010	York Region Shooters		
2011–2012	Krylia Sovetov	5	(0)
2012–2013	Kecskemét	0	(0)
2013	Torpedo Moscow	1	(0)
2014	Vaughan Azzurri	16	(6)
2015	Okzhetpes	12	(1)
2016–2017	Vaughan Azzurri	24	(12)
2018	Unionville Milliken	4	(1)
2018	Jonava	6	(0)
2019–2020	York9	29	(5)
2021–2022	Cavalry FC	40	(1)
2023	Vaughan Azzurri	2	(1)
- * Club domestic league appearances and goals as of June 18, 2023

Joseph William Anthony Di Chiara (born January 30, 1992) is a former Canadian professional soccer player who played as a midfielder.

== Club career ==
=== Early career ===
Di Chiara played youth soccer with Spartacus soccer club. In 2010, he began his career with the York Region Shooters in the Canadian Soccer League, and in 2011 was signed by Krylia Sovetov Samara, who became interested in him through a connection with his youth coach at Spartacus, Yuri Studin.

=== Krylia Sovetov ===
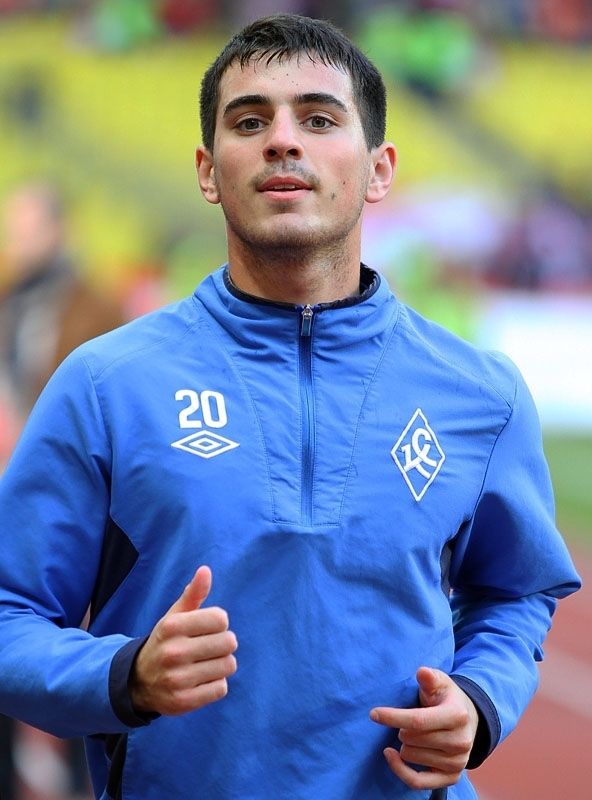
Di Chiara with Krylia Sovetov in 2011

Di Chiara made his Russian Premier League debut for Krylia Sovetov Samara on 18 June 2011 in a game against Terek Grozny.

=== Kecskemeti ===
Di Chiara then moved to Hungary, joining Kecskemeti, but his stint was marred by injury.

=== Torpedo Moscow ===
Di Chiara returned to Russia, joining Torpedo Moscow in the second tier.

=== Vaughan Azzurri ===
Di Chiara returned to North America in 2014 to play in the newly formed League1 Ontario with Vaughan Azzurri. He was named L1O Cup MVP during the season, after Vaughan captured the cup, defeating Sigma FC in the final.

=== Okzhetpes ===
In February 2015 Di Chiara signed with Kazakhstan Premier League side Okzhetpes. He made his debut against Astana on March 7. Di Chiara left Okzhetpes on 1 July 2015.

=== Second spell at Vaughan ===
Di Chiara returned once again to Vaughan Azzurri for the 2016 and 2017 League1 Ontario seasons. With the Azzurri, Di Chiara won the 2016 League Cup and 2016 League, as well as Finals MVP, in the championship match against FC London where he helped contribute to all four of his team's goals.

=== Unionville Milliken ===
For the 2018 League1 Ontario season, Di Chiara joined Unionville Milliken SC.

=== Jonava ===
In June 2018, Di Chiara signed with A Lyga club FK Jonava. He made his debut on June 20 in a 2–0 loss to Sūduva. With the club set to be relegated, he reached an agreement with the club to release him early from his contract, allowing him to join the Canadian Premier League.

=== York9 ===
In January 2019, Di Chiara signed with Canadian Premier League club York9 FC. He made his debut for York9 in their inaugural match against Forge FC on April 27, 2019. Di Chiara scored his first goal for York9 on October 12 against Forge, netting a penalty to open the scoring in an eventual 4–0 victory. In October 2020 York9 announced Di Chiara was leaving the club per his own request.

=== Cavalry FC ===
On November 20, 2020, Di Chiara signed a multi-year contract with Cavalry FC. In January 2022, it was announced Di Chiara would return for the 2022 season, his second with the club. Cavalry would announce that Di Chiara would leave the club upon completion of the 2022 season.

== International career ==
Di Chiara was called up to the Canadian senior team on September 26, 2011 for Canada's games in the second round of CONCACAF 2014 World Cup Qualification, but did not appear in either match.

== Minifootball career ==
In 2023, Di Chiara played with Sports Leagues Canada FC at The Soccer Tournament, finishing in second place.

== Career statistics ==
As of June 18, 2023

Appearances and goals by club, season and competition
Club	League				Playoffs		National cup		League cup		Total	
Club	Division	Season	Apps	Goals	Apps	Goals	Apps	Goals	Apps	Goals	Apps	Goals
Krylia Sovetov	2011–12	Russian Premier League	5	0	–		0	0	–		5	0
Kecskeméti	2012–13	Nemzeti Bajnokság I	0	0	–		1	0	–		1	0
Torpedo Moscow	2012-13	Russian Football National League	1	0	–		0	0	–		1	0
Torpedo Moscow	2013–14	Russian Football National League	0	0	–		0	0	–		0	0
Vaughan Azzurri	2014	League1 Ontario	16	6	–		–			1	16	6
Okzhetpes	2015	Kazakhstan Premier League	12	1	–		1	0	–		13	1
Vaughan Azzurri	2016	League1 Ontario	10	4	1	0	–			2	11	4
Vaughan Azzurri	2017	League1 Ontario	14	8	–		–			1	14	8
Vaughan Azzurri	Total		24	12	1	0	0			3	25	12
Unionville Milliken	2018	League1 Ontario	4	1	0	0	–		–		4	1
Jonava	2018	A Lyga	6	0	–		1	0	0	0	7	0
York9	2019	Canadian Premier League	23	2	–		4	0	–		27	2
York9	2020	Canadian Premier League	6	3	–		–		–		6	3
York9	Total		29	5	4	0	0	0	0	0	33	5
Cavalry FC	2021	Canadian Premier League	24	1	1	0	1	0	–		26	1
Cavalry FC	2022	Canadian Premier League	16	0	2	0	0	0	–		18	0
Cavalry FC	Total		40	1	3	0	1	0	0	0	44	1
Vaughan Azzurri	2023	League1 Ontario	2	1	0	0	1	0	–		3	1
Career total			139	27	4	0	9	0		3	152+	30

== Honours ==
Vaughan Azzurri

- League1 Ontario First Team All Star: 2016, 2017
