= Emmanuel Zambazis =

Canadian soccer player (born 1997)

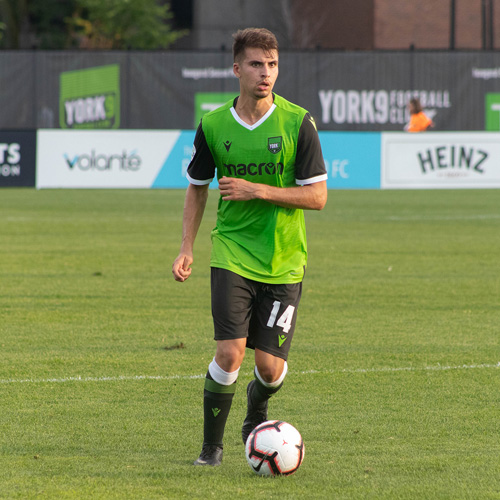
- Zambazis playing for York9 in 2019

Personal information
- Date of birth: April 24, 1997 (age 29)
- Place of birth: Toronto, Ontario, Canada
- Height: 1.82 m (6 ft 0 in)
- Position: Midfielder

Youth career
- Olympic Flame SC
- East York SC
- Mississauga SC

College career
Years	Team	Apps	(Gls)
2018	York Lions	11	(1)
2021	York Lions	11	(1)

Senior career*
Years	Team	Apps	(Gls)
2014	Vaughan Azzurri		
2014–2017	Iraklis	9	(0)
2019	York9	4	(0)
2023	Vaughan Azzurri	3	(0)

International career^{‡}
2016	Greece U19	2	(0)
2017	Canada U20	2	(0)
- * Club domestic league appearances and goals as of May 28, 2023 ‡ National team caps and goals as of September 18, 2017

Emmanuel Zambazis (Greek: Εμμανουήλ Ζαμπάζης; born April 24, 1997), sometimes known as Manolis Zambazis, is a Canadian soccer player who plays as a midfielder.

== Early life ==
Zambazis began playing soccer at the age of six with Olympic Flame SC. He later played for East York SC and Mississauga SC.

== University career ==
In 2018, after playing three years at the professional level in Greece, Zambazis began attending York University, where he played for the men's soccer team. He scored his first goal on September 7, in a 1–1 draw against the McMaster Marauders. At the end of his first season, he was named an OUA West Second Team All Star. He earned U SPORTS academic all-Canadian honours for the 2020–21 academic year. In 2021, he was named an OUA East All-Star. Over his time with York, he won the OUA Championship in 2018 and an OUA silver medal in 2021.

== Club career ==
In 2014, Zambazis appeared for Vaughan Azzurri in League1 Ontario.

In August 2014, Zambazis signed with Greek Football League club Iraklis. On October 29, 2015, Zambazis made his professional debut for Iraklis in a Greek Football Cup match against PAS Giannina. Zambazis left the club upon the club's dissolution due to financial troubles.

In November 2018, at the 2018 CPL–U Sports Draft, Zambazis was selected in the second round (11th overall) by York9 FC. In April 2019, he officially signed a contract with the club. He made his first start for York9 FC in a match against Pacific FC on July 17, 2019. In August, he chose to remain with the team, rather than to return to university to play. In September 2019, he terminated his contract with the club by mutual consent.

In 2023, he played with Vaughan Azzurri in League1 Ontario.

== International career ==
Zambazis is eligible to represent Canada or Greece internationally.

In November 2011, he made his debut in the Canadian national program, attending a Canada U15 identification camp.

In February 2016, Zambazis played with the Greece U19 in two friendly games against the Czech Republic U19.

In May 2016, he was called up to a training camp with the Canada U20. In February 2017, Zambazis was called up to represent the Canada U20 at the 2017 CONCACAF U-20 Championship.

== Personal life ==
His maternal uncle is Spiros Papathanasakis, the former owner of Iraklis F.C.

== Career statistics ==
As of May 28, 2023

Appearances and goals by club, season and competition
Club	Season	League			Playoffs		National cup		Continental		Total	
Club	Season	Division	Apps	Goals	Apps	Goals	Apps	Goals	Apps	Goals	Apps	Goals
Iraklis	2014–15	Football League	0	0	—		0	0	—		0	0
Iraklis	2015–16	Super League Greece	9	0	—		4	0	—		13	0
Iraklis	2016–17	Super League Greece	0	0	—		0	0	—		0	0
York9 FC	2019	Canadian Premier League	4	0	—		0	0	—		4	0
Vaughan Azzurri	2023	League1 Ontario	3	0	0	0	1	0	—		4	0
Career Total			16	0	0	0	5	0	0	0	21	0
