= Justin Springer =

Saint Kitts and Nevis footballer (born 1993)

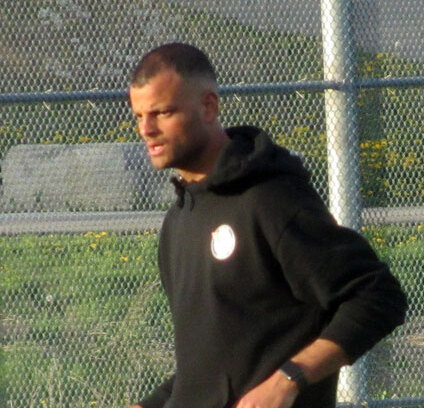

Personal information
- Date of birth: 8 July 1993 (age 33)
- Place of birth: Burlington, Ontario, Canada
- Height: 1.90 m (6 ft 3 in)
- Position: Centre-back

College career
Years	Team	Apps	(Gls)
2012–2016	Guelph Gryphons	54	(6)

Senior career*
Years	Team	Apps	(Gls)
2015–2017	K–W United	26	(2)
2018	Vaughan Azzurri	9	(0)
2019	York9	11	(0)
2021	Guelph United	2	(0)
Total		48	(2)

International career^{‡}
2015	Canada Universiade	5	(0)
2016–2019	Saint Kitts and Nevis	15	(0)

Managerial career
- 2018–: Guelph Gryphons (assistant)
- 2021–2022: Guelph United (co-associate)
- 2023–2024: Guelph United
- * Club domestic league appearances and goals as of 23 October 2021 ‡ National team caps and goals as of 22 November 2019

Justin Springer (born 8 July 1993) is a former professional footballer and current coach. Born in Canada, he represented the Saint Kitts and Nevis national team.

== University career ==
Springer began attending the University of Guelph in 2012, where he played for the men's soccer team. In his first season, he played all sixteen games and was named an OUA West First Team All-Star. In his second season, he was once again named an OUA First Team All-Star and was invited to play in the OUA Showcase in the spring. He was once again named an OUA West First Team All-Star in both his third and fourth seasons. In his fifth and final season, he captained the team and helped the team with the OUA championship and earn a third-place finish in the 2016 CIS Championship. He was named an OUA First Team All-Star for the fifth consecutive year, while also being named a U Sports Second Team All-Canadian.

== Club career ==
Springer began playing for USL PDL club K–W United FC in 2015. In 2016, he made 13 appearances, scoring one goal and appearing in one playoff match. In 2017, Springer made another 11 appearances for K–W, scoring one goal and making one playoff appearance.

He then spent a couple months on trial with Toronto FC II.

In 2018, Springer joined League1 Ontario club Vaughan Azzurri, making nine appearances in the regular season and appearing in Vaughan's first two playoff matches of the group stage. He then played in the final against Woodbridge Strikers, winning the league championship.

On 8 February 2019, Springer signed his first professional contract with Canadian Premier League side York9. He made his debut for York9 in their inaugural match against Forge FC on April 27, 2019. He played in 11 league matches in 2019.

While serving as the Guelph United FC associate coach, he appeared in two matches in 2021, playing the full 90 minutes each time.

== International career ==
Springer was born in Canada to a Kittitian father.

He represented Canada at the 2015 FISU Universiade.

He made his debut for the Saint Kitts and Nevis national football team in a friendly 0–0 tie with Nicaragua on 31 August 2016. In September 2019, he declined a national team call-up to pursue minute with his club team, but returned to the squad for the next set of call-ups in October and November.

== Coaching career ==
He has served as the assistant coach of the University of Guelph Gryphons soccer team since 2018 and also serves as the Technical Manager of the youth Guelph Soccer Club. In 2021, he was named as co-head coach of Guelph United F.C. in League1 Ontario, alongside Keith Mason. In 2021, after Guelph United won the league title, he was named co-coach of the year with fellow Guelph Associate coach Keith Mason. In 2023, he became the full-time head coach, with Mason becoming the General Manager. At the end of the 2024 season, he stepped down as coach of the first team for personal reasons, but would remain with the club in another capacity.

== Career statistics ==
Club	Season	League			Playoffs		Domestic Cup		League Cup		Total	
Club	Season	Division	Apps	Goals	Apps	Goals	Apps	Goals	Apps	Goals	Apps	Goals
K–W United	2015	Premier Development League	2	0	—		—		—		2	0
K–W United	2016	Premier Development League	13	1	1	0	—		—		14	1
K–W United	2017	Premier Development League	11	1	1	0	—		—		12	1
K–W United	Total		26	2	2	0	0	0	0	0	28	2
Vaughan Azzurri	2018	League1 Ontario	9	0	3	0	—		4	0	16	0
York9 FC	2019	Canadian Premier League	11	0	—		4	0	—		15	0
Guelph United FC	2021	League1 Ontario	2	0	0	0	—		—		2	0
Career total			48	2	5	0	4	0	4	0	61	2

== Honours ==
K–W United

- USL PDL Championship: 2015

Vaughan Azzurri

- League1 Ontario Championship: 2018

Guelph United

- League1 Ontario Championship: 2021

Individual

- OUA First Team All-Star: 2012, 2013, 2014, 2015, 2016
- U Sports Second Team All-Canadian: 2015
