= Diyaeddine Abzi =

Canadian soccer player (born 1998)

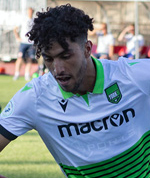
- Abzi in 2019

Personal information
- Date of birth: 23 November 1998 (age 27)
- Place of birth: Fez, Morocco
- Height: 1.83 m (6 ft 0 in)
- Position: Left-back

Team information
- Current team: FC Supra du Québec
- Number: 11

Youth career
- 2008–2017: FS Salaberry

Senior career*
Years	Team	Apps	(Gls)
2018	AS Blainville	20	(2)
2019–2022	York United	64	(7)
2022–2024	Pau FC	29	(1)
2023–2024	→ Leganés (loan)	4	(0)
2026–	FC Supra du Québec	22	(1)

International career^{‡}
2018	Canada (futsal)	1	(1)
2021	Canada U23	1	(0)
- * Club domestic league appearances and goals as of November 15, 2026 ‡ National team caps and goals as of 28 March 2021

Diyaeddine Abzi (born 23 November 1998) is a professional soccer player who plays as a left-back for FC Supra du Québec in the Canadian Premier League. Born in Morocco, he represented Canada at youth international level.

== Early life ==
Born in Fez, Morocco, Abzi moved to Montreal at age nine, where he began playing youth soccer with FS Salaberry.

In 2015, Abzi played for FS Salaberry at the U21 level, scoring one goal in three appearances. The following year, he made he played at the senior amateur debut with Salaberry in LSEQ Division 2 and made a total of six appearances that season as Salaberry earned promotion to D1. At the U21 level for Salaberry that year, he scored fourteen goals in thirteen appearances. In 2017, Abzi scored ten goals in thirteen appearances for Salaberry in D1, leading the club and finishing third in league scoring. In U21 play, Abzi scored 26 goals in 15 appearances.

== Club career ==
In 2018, Abzi played for defending PLSQ champions Blainville, making twenty appearances and scoring two goals in league play. In the Canadian Championship, Abzi scored the lone goal in Blainville's 1–0 win over Oakville Blue Devils in the second leg of the First Preliminary Round. He then appeared as a substitute in both games of Blainville's Second Preliminary Round series against Ottawa Fury.

In February 2019, Abzi signed with Canadian Premier League side York9 (later York United). On 27 April 2019, he made his professional debut as a substitute in the inaugural CPL match against Forge FC. Abzi scored his first goal for the club on 12 October 2019, against Forge. That season, he made a total of 24 league appearances and six in the Canadian Championship. In December 2019, Abzi re-signed with York for the 2020 season. On 29 April 2020, he signed a further contract extension until at least 2022. In 2021, he continued to play a crucial role for York, and was described as "one of the most dynamic and talented" players in the league. York finished in fourth place in the regular season, which qualified them to the semifinals, where they were defeated by Forge FC. Scoring 6 goals and 3 assists that season as a fullback, at the conclusion of the season he was ranked the 4th best player in the league. There was interest from Major League Soccer club Toronto FC to bring him in for a trial, however, an injury prevented Abzi from attending. At the time of his departure in the summer of 2022, he was York's all-time appearance leader.

In June 2022, York United announced the transfer of Abzi to French club Pau FC of Ligue 2, effective 1 July, where he signed a three-year contract. He made his debut for Pau on July 30 in their season opener, starting the match and playing the full 90 minutes in a 4–0 defeat to Guingamp. Abzi scored his first goal for Pau against Paris FC on January 31, 2023. In August 2023, it was announced that Abzi would be loaned out to La Liga 2 club Leganés for the 2023–24 season, with an option for a permanent transfer. At the end of the season, the option was not picked up, and he was also released by Pau.

In June 2024, it was announced that he failed a drug test for marijuana and was banned for 2 years by the French Anti-Doping Agency.

Upon his training ban due to his suspension expiring on January 27, 2026, he began training with Canadian Premier League club FC Supra du Québec (with his match ban in effect until March 27, 2026). In February 2026, he signed a contract with the club.

== International career ==
=== Canada Futsal ===
In January 2018, Abzi played futsal for Canada in a friendly against Costa Rica, netting a goal in a 5–4 defeat.

=== Canada ===
Abzi was called up to the Canadian U-23 provisional roster for the 2020 CONCACAF Men's Olympic Qualifying Championship on February 26, 2020, and made one appearance for the side against Mexico. On February 26, 2024, Abzi was named to the Canada men's national soccer team provisional roster for the 2024 Copa América qualifying play-offs against Trinidad and Tobago.

== Career statistics ==
As of 18 February 2024

Club statistics
Club	Season	League			Playoffs		National Cup		League Cup		Total	
Club	Season	Division	Apps	Goals	Apps	Goals	Apps	Goals	Apps	Goals	Apps	Goals
AS Blainville	2018	Première Ligue de soccer du Québec	20	2	—		3	1	1	0	24	3
York United	2019	Canadian Premier League	24	1	—		6	0	—		30	1
York United	2020	Canadian Premier League	5	0	—		—		—		5	0
York United	2021	Canadian Premier League	25	6	1	0	2	0	—		28	6
York United	2022	Canadian Premier League	10	0	—		3	1	—		13	1
York United	Total		64	7	1	0	11	1	0	0	76	8
Pau FC	2022–23	Ligue 2	29	1	—		3	1	—		32	2
Leganés (loan)	2023–24	La Liga 2	4	0	—		1	0	—		5	0
Career total			117	10	1	0	18	3	1	0	137	11

== Honours ==
Leganés

- Segunda División: 2023–24
