= Colm Vance =

Canadian soccer player (born 1992)

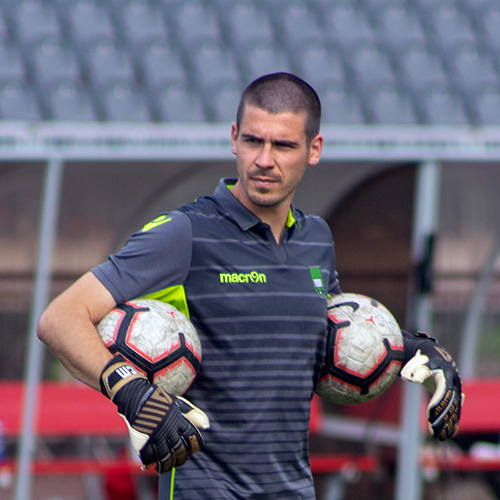
- Vance in 2019

Personal information
- Date of birth: 31 August 1992 (age 34)
- Place of birth: Bradford, Ontario, Canada
- Height: 1.88 m (6 ft 2 in)
- Position: Goalkeeper

Youth career
- York Jets

College career
Years	Team	Apps	(Gls)
2011–2015	York Lions	39	(0)

Senior career*
Years	Team	Apps	(Gls)
2016–2018	Vaughan Azzurri	18	(0)
2019–2020	York9	1	(0)
- * Club domestic league appearances and goals as of 19 October 2019

Colm Vance (born 31 August 1992) is a Canadian former professional soccer player who played as a goalkeeper.

== Club career ==
=== Early career ===
Vance played varsity soccer at York University for five consecutive years, helping lead the club to numerous awards. The York Lions won OUA bronze in 2011 & 2012, then progressed to OUA league championships in 2013, 2014 & 2015 in addition to claiming CIS titles in 2014 and 2015. Vance led the way during two academic all-Canadian honours seasons (2014 & 2015) while also being named an OUA West first-team all-star in 2015.

=== Vaughan Azzurri ===
In 2016, Vance made five league appearances for Vaughan Azzurri in League1 Ontario, and also started both legs of the 2016 Inter Provincial Cup. Vance returned to the Azzurri in 2017, and made seven appearances that season. In 2018, he made six league appearances for Vaughan.

=== York9 ===
On 12 March 2019, Vance signed his first professional contract with Canadian Premier League side York9. On 19 October 2019, he made his debut as a starter in the final match of the 2019 season, a 2–0 loss to HFX Wanderers. In July 2020 Vance retired from professional soccer so he could focus on his schooling.
