= Daniel Gogarty =

Canadian soccer player (born 1996)

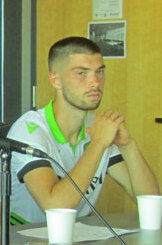
- Gogarty in 2019

Personal information
- Date of birth: December 7, 1996 (age 29)
- Place of birth: Scarborough, Ontario, Canada
- Height: 1.88 m (6 ft 2 in)
- Position: Centre-back

Youth career
- North York Hearts

College career
Years	Team	Apps	(Gls)
2014–2018	York Lions	68	(0)

Senior career*
Years	Team	Apps	(Gls)
2014–2018	Vaughan Azzurri	20+	(2+)
2019	York9	20	(0)
2022	Toronto FC II	2	(0)
2022–2023	Vaughan Azzurri	26	(0)
2026–	Vaughan Azzurri	1	(0)
- * Club domestic league appearances and goals as of April 20, 2026

Daniel Gogarty (born December 7, 1996) is a Canadian professional soccer player who plays as a centre-back for Vaughan Azzurri in the Ontario Premier League.

== University career ==
Gogarty attended York University, where he played for the men's soccer team for five seasons from 2014 to 2018, making a total of 68 appearances. With the Lions, he won two national championships in 2014 and 2015, along with four OUA conference championships in 2014, 2015, 2017, and 2018. In 2015, he was named player of the game in the championship final. In 2016, he was named a U SPORTS second-team All-Canadian and an OUA West first-team all-star, as York won the OUA silver medal. In 2017, he was named a U SPORTS first team All-Canadian and was once again an OUA West first-team all-star and was also team co-MVP. In 2018, he served as team captain, was named team MVP, and was an OUA West first-team all-star for the third consecutive year.

== Club career ==
From 2014 to 2018, Gogarty played with Vaughan Azzurri in League1 Ontario. In 2014, he was named to the league's Young Stars XI. With Vaughan, he won the 2016 league championship.

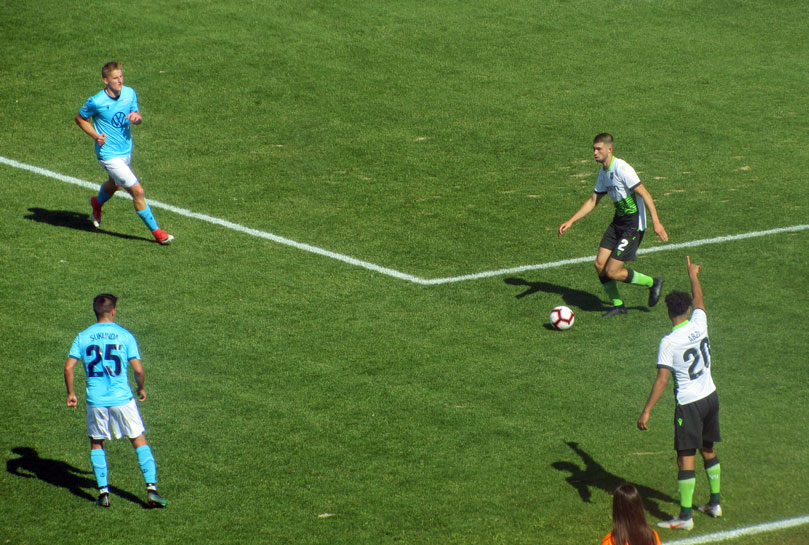
York Daniel Gogarty playing with York9 in 2019

In November 2018, Gogarty was drafted in the first round of the 2018 CPL–U Sports Draft, fourth overall, by York9 FC. On February 4, 2019, he officially signed his first professional contract with York ahead of the inaugural Canadian Premier League season. On April 27, 2019, he made his professional debut in the first-ever game in Canadian Premier League history, a 1–1 draw with Forge FC. He appeared in 22 matches for York, across all competitions. In November 2019, the club announced that Gogarty would not be returning for the 2020 season. Afterwards, he stepped away from the sport, pursuing opportunities in the fashion industry.

On April 23, 2022, he signed a short-term contract with Toronto FC II of MLS Next Pro. He made his debut the next day, starting against Columbus Crew 2.

Upon the conclusion of his deal with Toronto FC II, he returned to his former club Vaughan Azzurri in League1 Ontario.
