= Simon Adjei =

Swedish footballer (born 1993)

Simon Karlsson Adjei
Personal information
- Full name: Simon Emanuel Karlsson Adjei
- Date of birth: 10 November 1993 (age 32)
- Place of birth: Vaggeryd, Sweden
- Height: 1.92 m (6 ft 4 in)
- Position: Striker

Team information
- Current team: Husqvarna FF
- Number: 12

Youth career
- Waggeryds IK
- Husqvarna FF

Senior career*
Years	Team	Apps	(Gls)
2011–2016	Husqvarna FF	45	(12)
2013	→ Råslätts SK (loan)	8	(2)
2014	→ Tenhults IF (loan)	22	(13)
2016–2018	Aurora United FC	19	(19)
2018–2019	Assyriska IK	25	(30)
2019–2020	York9	24	(7)
2020–2021	Assyriska IK	29	(25)
2021–2023	Varbergs BoIS	32	(5)
2023	AFC Eskilstuna	12	(1)
2023	Länk Vilaverdense	8	(2)
2024	Anadia	6	(0)
2024–	Husqvarna FF	36	(15)
- * Club domestic league appearances and goals as of 24 November 2025

Simon Karlsson Adjei (born 10 November 1993) is a Swedish professional footballer who plays as a striker for Husqvarna FF.

== Career ==
His first childhood club was Waggeryds IK. He began his senior career playing for Husqvarna FF, Råslätts SK, and Tenhults IF.

In 2016, he moved to Canada, joining Aurora United FC in League1 Ontario, where he scored 19 goals in 19 league games, as well as netting an additional two goals in the league cup. His coach at Aurora, Jim Brennan told him that "he’s too good for this league, and that he needs to go back to Europe."

He returned to Sweden and joined Assyriska IK in the third tier in 2018, where he scored 30 goals.

On 3 December 2018, Adjei signed a two-year contract with Canadian Premier League side York9, reuniting with his former manager at Aurora, Jim Brennan, and becoming the first foreign signing in league history. He made his debut for York9 in their inaugural match against Forge FC on 27 April 2019. He scored his first goal for the club in their following game on 4 May 2019, against Cavalry FC in a 2–1 defeat. In December, he re-signed with the club for the 2020 season. However, on 1 February 2020, Adjei agreed to the mutual termination of his contract. In 2020, he said that "It (Canadian soccer) is much tougher, and you are left a little more on the field, you have to manage yourself a little more. You do not have the same support".

He then returned to his former club, Assyriska IK, in the Swedish third tier, where he scored 25 goals in 27 appearances.

In November 2020 Adjei joined top division club Varbergs BoIS.

On 5 December 2022, Ajdei signed a one-year deal with Superettan side AFC Eskilstuna. On 22 June 2023, the club announced that Ajdei's contract had been terminated by mutual agreement.

On 22 July 2023, Ajdei joined recently-promoted to Liga Portugal 2 club Länk Vilaverdense.
