= Stefan Lamanna =

Canadian soccer player

Personal information
- Full name: Stefan Antonio Lamanna
- Date of birth: 31 July 1995 (age 31)
- Place of birth: Markham, Ontario, Canada
- Height: 1.68 m (5 ft 6 in)
- Position: Forward

College career
Years	Team	Apps	(Gls)
2013–2014	Houston Baptist Huskies	32	(7)
2015–2016	Vermont Catamounts	42	(10)

Senior career*
Years	Team	Apps	(Gls)
2016–2017	Durham United FA	25	(10)
2018	Tindastóll	21	(11)
2019	Darby FC	7	(4)
2019	York9	6	(0)
2022	Darby FC	8	(0)
- * Club domestic league appearances and goals as of August 24, 2022

Stefan Antonio Lamanna (born 31 July 1995) is a Canadian professional soccer player who plays as a forward.

== Club career ==
In 2016, Lamanna played for League1 Ontario side Durham United FA, scoring five goals in eight appearances. He returned to Durham in 2017, making another seventeen appearances and scoring five goals.

In 2018, Lamanna played for Icelandic 2. deild karla side Tindastóll. He made 21 appearances that season and scored eleven goals, tying for fourth among the league's top scorers.

In 2019, Lamanna joined League1 Ontario side Darby FC and scored four goals in seven appearances that season.

On 27 July 2019, Lamanna signed with Canadian Premier League side York9. That day, he made his debut as a substitute in a 6–2 win over HFX Wanderers. Lamanna went on to make a total of six appearances that season. On 15 November 2019, the club announced that Lamanna would not be returning for the 2020 season.

In 2022, he returned to Darby FC.
