= Cyrus Rollocks =

Canadian soccer player (born 1998)

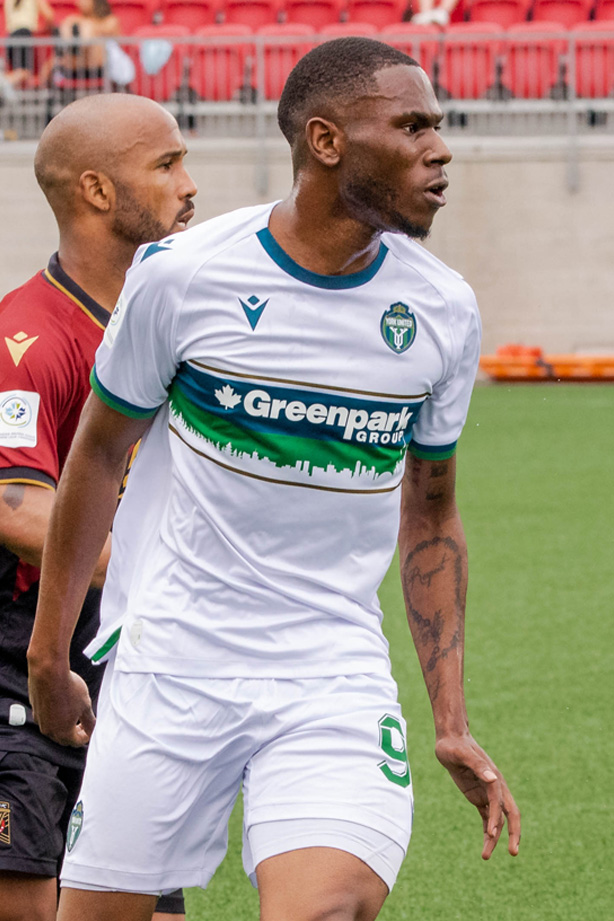
- Rollocks playing for York United in 2022

Personal information
- Full name: Cyrus Kamron Rollocks
- Date of birth: March 23, 1998 (age 28)
- Place of birth: Toronto, Ontario, Canada
- Height: 1.85 m (6 ft 1 in)
- Position: Forward

Team information
- Current team: International FC

Youth career
- North Mississauga SC
- Toronto FC

Senior career*
Years	Team	Apps	(Gls)
2015–2017	Toronto FC III	40+	(39)
2017	Toronto FC II	0	(0)
2018	Master's Futbol	6	(3)
2019	York9	9	(0)
2021	Blue Devils FC	10	(2)
2022	Scrosoppi FC	19	(6)
2022	→ York United FC (loan)	2	(0)
2025	North Toronto Nitros	17	(10)
2026–	International FC	0	(0)

International career^{‡}
2014–2015	Canada U17	2	(0)
- * Club domestic league appearances and goals as of August 26, 2025 ‡ National team caps and goals as of April 27, 2019

Cyrus Kamron Rollocks (born March 23, 1998) is a Canadian professional soccer player who plays as a forward for the International FC in League1 Ontario.

== Club career ==
In 2015, Rollocks played for Toronto FC Academy in League1 Ontario, finishing fourth in league scoring with fourteen goals. In 2016, Rollocks scored four goals in ten appearances for TFCIII in L1O and also scored four goals in thirteen appearances in the Premier Development League. In 2017, Rollocks scored seventeen goals in seventeen appearances for Toronto FC III, tying for second in league scoring. He was subsequently named the 2017 League1 Ontario Young Player of the Year.

In 2018, Rollocks joined League1 Ontario side Master's Futbol, scoring three goals in six appearances that season.

In January 2019, Rollocks signed with Canadian Premier League side York9 FC. On 27 April 2019, Rollocks made his professional debut for York 9 in the Canadian Premier League inaugural match, ending in a 1–1 draw with Forge FC. He made a total of nine appearances in league play and two in the Canadian Championship that year. In November 2019, the club announced that Rollocks would not be returning for the 2020 season.

In March 2020, Rollocks went on trial with Forge FC.

In 2021, he joined Blue Devils FC of League1 Ontario, scoring two goals in his debut against North Mississauga SC.

In 2022, he played with Scrosoppi FC in League1 Ontario. On June 26, he was an emergency signing for his former club York United FC (previously known as York9 when he played for them), appearing in the match against Valour FC.

In 2025, he began playing for the North Toronto Nitros in League1 Ontario. That season, he was named the league's Forward of the Year and a First Team All-Star.

== International career ==
Rollocks received his first Canadian youth national team call-up for an under-17 camp in December 2014. He subsequently represented Canada at the 2015 CONCACAF U-17 Championship, where he made substitute appearances against Mexico and Costa Rica.

== Career statistics ==
As of August 29, 2025

Club statistics
Club	Season	League			Playoffs		Domestic Cup		League Cup		Other		Total	
Club	Season	Division	Apps	Goals	Apps	Goals	Apps	Goals	Apps	Goals	Apps	Goals	Apps	Goals
Toronto FC III	2015	League1 Ontario	?	14	—		—		?	1	—		?	15
Toronto FC III	2016	League1 Ontario	10	4	—		—		?	0	—		10	4
Toronto FC III	2016	Premier Development League	13	4	—		—		—		—		13	4
Toronto FC III	2017	League1 Ontario	17	17	—		—		?	0	—		17	17
Toronto FC III	Total		40+	39	0	0	0	0	0	0	0	0	41+	40
Master's Futbol	2018	League1 Ontario	6	3	—		—		1	1	—		6	3
York9	2019	Canadian Premier League	9	0	—		2	0	—		—		11	0
Blue Devils FC	2021	League1 Ontario	10	2	2	0	—		—		—		12	2
Scrosoppi FC	2022	League1 Ontario	19	6	—		—		—		—		19	6
York United FC (loan)	2022	Canadian Premier League	2	0	0	0	0	0	—		—		2	0
Scrosoppi FC	2022	League1 Ontario	19	6	—		—		—		—		19	6
North Toronto Nitros	2025	League1 Ontario Premier	17	10	—		—		2	5	1	1	20	16
Career total			103	60	2	0	2	0	4+	6	1	1	112+	67
