= 2019 Canadian Premier League finals =

Soccer match

2019 Canadian Premier League final
- Event: 2019 Canadian Premier League season
| Forge FC | Cavalry FC |
| 2 | 0 |
- on aggregate

First leg
| Forge FC | Cavalry FC |
| 1 | 0 |
- Date: October 26, 2019
- Venue: Tim Hortons Field, Hamilton, Ontario
- Man of the Match: Tristan Borges (Forge FC)
- Referee: Pierre-Luc Lauzière
- Attendance: 10,486
- Weather: Cloudy; 9 °C (48 °F); 76% humidity

Second leg
| Cavalry FC | Forge FC |
| 0 | 1 |
- Date: November 2, 2019
- Venue: ATCO Field, Foothills County, Alberta
- Man of the Match: Daniël Krutzen (Forge FC)
- Referee: Alain Ruch
- Attendance: 5,831
- Weather: Mostly cloudy 7 °C (45 °F); 57% humidity

The 2019 Canadian Premier League finals determined the winner of the Canadian Premier League's inaugural 2019 season. It featured Cavalry FC of Calgary, Alberta, and Forge FC of Hamilton, Ontario, and was the culmination of a rivalry that had developed between those teams.

It was contested over two legs between the winners of the spring and fall seasons, with the fall season winners choosing which leg to host. Since Cavalry won both split seasons, the team with the second-best overall season record, Forge, also competed in the Championship.

Forge won the inaugural Canadian Premier League title 2–0 on aggregate following a pair of 1–0 victories. This earned the club the right to compete in the 2020 CONCACAF League where they ultimately reached the quarter-finals.

== Path to the finals ==
The 2019 Canadian Premier League season used a split season format where each team played 10 games in an opening spring season and 18 games in a closing fall season. At the end of the full season, the spring season winner would face the fall season winner in a two-legged tie for the league title. If one team won both the spring and the fall seasons, that team would face the team with the highest cumulative points total across both seasons for the title.

On June 26, 2019, Cavalry won the spring season and qualified for the championship. On September 28, 2019, Forge secured the second best overall season record, and thus clinched the second spot in the finals.

Spring season

| Pos | Team | Pld | Pts |
|---|---|---|---|
| 1 | Cavalry | 10 | 24 |
| 2 | Forge | 10 | 19 |
| 3 | FC Edmonton | 10 | 14 |
| 4 | HFX Wanderers | 10 | 11 |
| 5 | Pacific | 10 | 11 |
| 6 | York9 | 10 | 11 |
| 7 | Valour | 10 | 9 |

Source: CanPL.ca

Fall season

| Pos | Team | Pld | Pts |
|---|---|---|---|
| 1 | Cavalry | 18 | 38 |
| 2 | Forge | 18 | 37 |
| 3 | York9 | 18 | 23 |
| 4 | Pacific | 18 | 20 |
| 5 | Valour | 18 | 19 |
| 6 | FC Edmonton | 18 | 18 |
| 7 | HFX Wanderers | 18 | 17 |

Source: CanPL.ca

Overall table

| Pos | Team | Pld | Pts |
|---|---|---|---|
| 1 | Cavalry (S) | 28 | 62 |
| 2 | Forge (C) | 28 | 56 |
| 3 | York9 | 28 | 34 |
| 4 | FC Edmonton | 28 | 32 |
| 5 | Pacific | 28 | 31 |
| 6 | Valour | 28 | 28 |
| 7 | HFX Wanderers | 28 | 28 |

Source: CanPL.ca
(C) Champions; (S) Regular season winner

=== Cavalry FC ===
Cavalry started the inaugural 2019 Canadian Premier League season as one of six newly-formed teams competing in the league. They started their spring campaign with a 2–1 win over York9 FC on May 4. They went on to win the first seven games of the ten game spring season before suffering a 1–0 to Forge FC. Their 2–0 victory in their next game against York9 on June 26 clinched the spring title and a berth in the finals.

Cavalry finished the spring season with a 8–0–2 record. They also won the fall competition by one point with a 11–5–2 record, giving the finals berth for that season to the second-placed overall record.

=== Forge FC ===
Forge was another one of the newly-formed teams for the inaugural season. They finished the spring season in second place with a 6–1–3 record. In the fall season, Cavalry and Forge cemented themselves as the top two teams in the standings. Forge was able to clinch the finals berth after a 3–0 victory over Pacific FC on September 28, 2019.

Despite not clinching the fall title, Cavalry and Forge's dominance ensured that no other team could catch them in either the fall or overall standings. Forge would go on to finish second in the fall season by one point, winning the finals berth not as the fall title winner but the second-placed overall finisher.

=== Head-to-head ===
Going into the finals, Cavalry and Forge had played each other seven times in 2019; winning three matches each, with one draw, and scoring seven goals apiece. In June, Cavalry defeated Forge 3–2 on aggregate in the second qualifying round of the Canadian Championship.

In the final week of the regular season, Forge and Cavalry faced-off in Hamilton. With both teams having clinched their positions in the overall table, each side rested key players in advance of the finals. Forge won the game 1–0 but defender Dominic Samuel picked up two yellow cards and was automatically suspended for the first leg of the finals.

== Venues ==
Forge's home of Tim Hortons Field in Hamilton, with a reduced seating capacity of 10,016 hosted the first leg. Opened in 2014, the multi-purpose stadium is shared with the Canadian Football League's Hamilton Tiger-Cats. The second leg was held in Cavalry's home of ATCO Field in Foothills County. It is a 5,288 capacity stadium part of the Spruce Meadows equestrian facility.

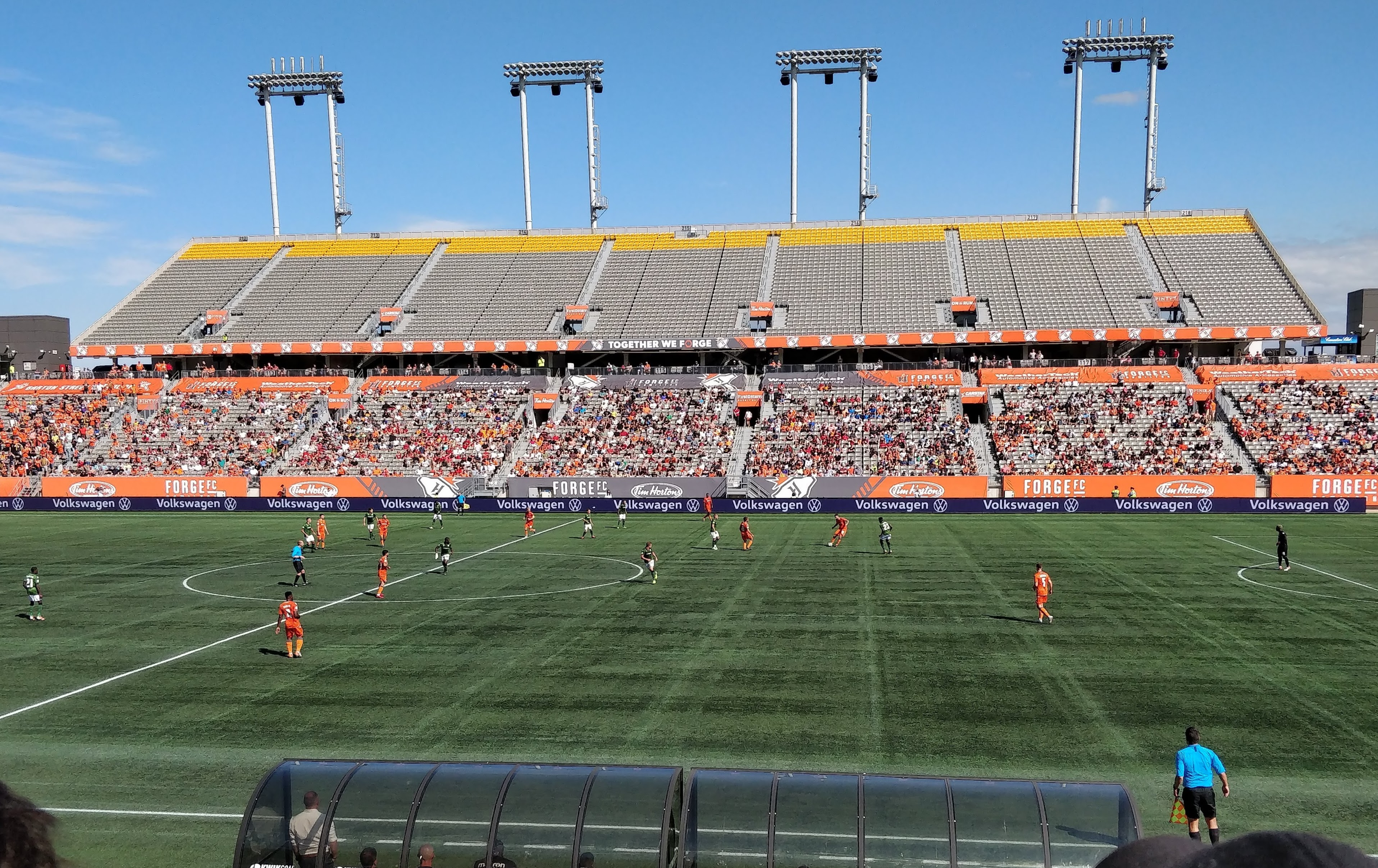
Tim Hortons Field in Hamilton hosted the first leg

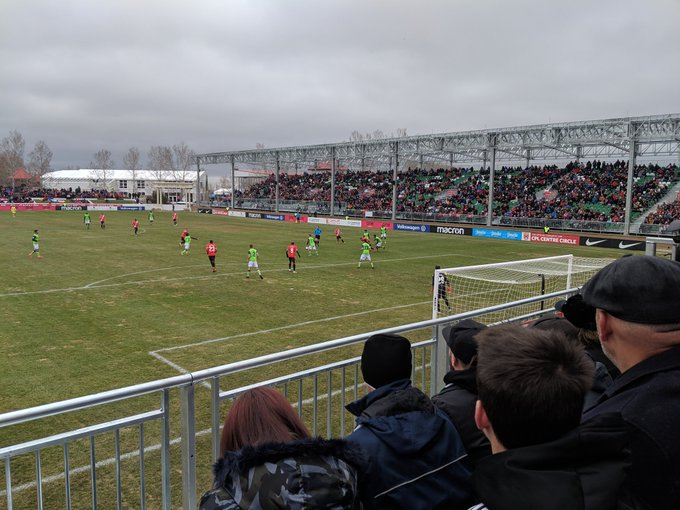
ATCO Field in Foothills County hosted the second leg

== Match details ==
=== First leg ===
==== Summary ====
The first leg of the finals was played on October 26 at Tim Hortons Field in Hamilton, Ontario. Forge FC entered the game without defenders Dominic Samuel and Bertrand Owundi who were serving suspensions. Forge had the first close chance when captain Kyle Bekker's long shot hit the crossbar in the 35th minute. Minutes later, Cavalry defender Joel Waterman handled the ball in his own penalty area while sliding to prevent a scoring chance. Waterman was sent off and Forge was awarded a penalty kick. CPL-leading scorer Tristan Borges took the penalty kick but it was stopped by Marco Carducci to keep the game scoreless. Late into first half stoppage time, Borges would beat Carducci with a left-footed strike to give Forge the lead going into halftime. Early in the second half, Forge controlled possession with the man-advantage. In the 69th minute, a challenge between Borges and Jay Wheeldon of Cavalry sent both players to the ground. As a result of the play, Borges was shown a red card and both teams finished the match with 10 players.

After the match, Cavalry and Forge appealed their respective red cards to the Canadian Soccer Association. The governing body's disciplinary committee upheld the red card to Cavalry's Joel Waterman for denying an obvious goal scoring opportunity, and confirmed he would be suspended for the second leg of the finals. The red card and suspension to Tristan Borges was overturned, with the committee citing that his actions "did not meet the threshold of a violent conduct offence."

==== Details ====
October 26, 2019
4:00 PM EDT

| Forge FC | 1–0 | Cavalry FC |
|---|---|---|
| Borges 45+1' | Recap; Report |

Tim Hortons Field, Hamilton, Ontario
Attendance: 10,486
Referee: Pierre-Luc Lauzière

| Forge | Cavalry |

Forge FC:
| GK | 1 | (Canada) Triston Henry |
| RB | 8 | (Canada) Giuliano Frano |
| CB | 30 | (Canada) David Edgar |
| CB | 5 | (Belgium) Daniël Krutzen |
| LB | 6 | (Canada) Kwame Awuah | (yellow card) 63' |
| CM | 13 | (Sweden) Alexander Achinioti-Jönsson |
| CM | 10 | (Canada) Kyle Bekker (c) |
| RW | 3 | (Senegal) Elimane Cissé | | (substituted off) 77' |
| AM | 19 | (Canada) Tristan Borges | (red card) 69' |
| LW | 11 | (Canada) Chris Nanco | | (substituted off) 90+3' |
| CF | 23 | (Canada) Anthony Novak | | (substituted off) 75' |
Substitutes:
| GK | 18 | (Guyana) Quillan Roberts |
| MF | 7 | (Canada) David Choinière | | (substituted on) 77' |
| FW | 9 | (Canada) Marcel Zajac | | (substituted on) 75' |
| DF | 16 | (Canada) Klaidi Cela |
| FW | 17 | (Canada) Kadell Thomas | | (substituted on) 90+3' |
| MF | 20 | (Canada) Justin Stoddart |
| DF | 22 | (Canada) Monti Mohsen |
Manager: (Canada) Bobby Smyrniotis

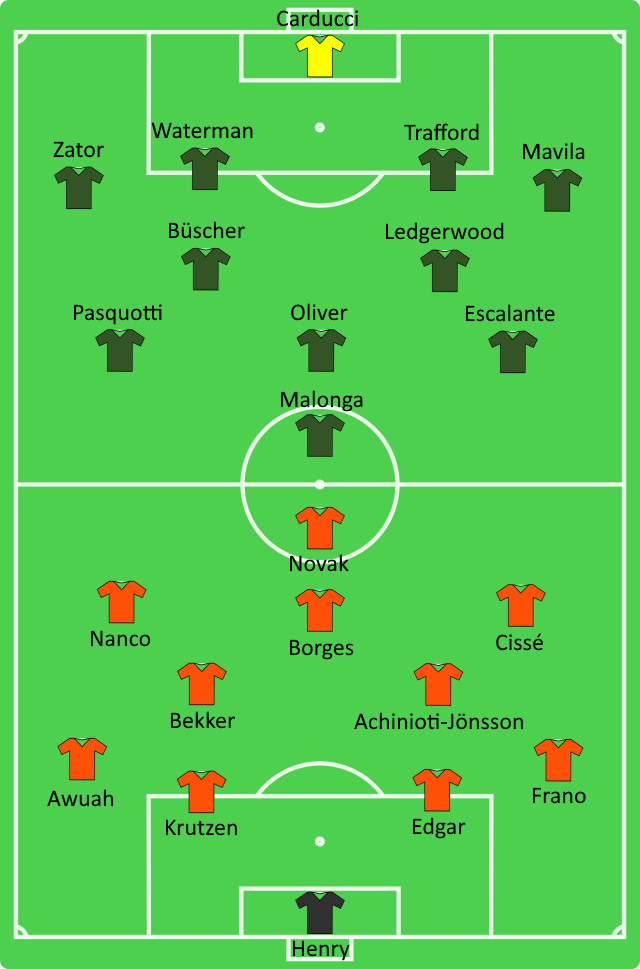

Cavalry FC:
| GK | 1 | (Canada) Marco Carducci |
| RB | 4 | (Canada) Dominick Zator |
| CB | 15 | (Canada) Joel Waterman | (red card) 37' |
| CB | 5 | (Canada) Mason Trafford | (yellow card) 75' |
| LB | 3 | (England) Nathan Mavila |
| CM | 8 | (Germany) Julian Büscher | | (substituted off) 85' |
| CM | 6 | (Canada) Nik Ledgerwood (c) | (yellow card) 88' |
| RW | 17 | (Canada) Nico Pasquotti |
| AM | 7 | (Brazil) Oliver | (yellow card) 24' | (substituted off) 46' |
| LW | 11 | (Honduras) José Escalante |
| CF | 23 | (Republic of the Congo) Dominique Malonga | | (substituted off) 61' |
Substitutes:
| GK | 22 | (Canada) Niko Giantsopoulos |
| FW | 9 | (England) Jordan Brown | | (substituted on) 61' |
| MF | 10 | (Canada) Sergio Camargo | | (substituted on) 85' |
| DF | 14 | (England) Jay Wheeldon | (yellow card) 69' | (substituted on) 46' |
| MF | 16 | (England) Elijah Adekugbe |
| MF | 20 | (Colombia) Carlos Patiño |
| DF | 21 | (Canada) Malyk Hamilton |
Manager: (England) Tommy Wheeldon Jr.

Man of the Match:
Tristan Borges (Forge FC)

Assistant referees:
Lyes Arfa
Peter Manastrysky
Fourth official:
Yusri Rudolf

=== Second leg ===
November 2, 2019
1:30 PM MDT

| Cavalry FC | 0–1 | Forge FC |
|---|---|---|
| | Recap; Report | Choinière 90+5' |

ATCO Field, Foothills County, Alberta
Attendance: 5,831
Referee: Alain Ruch

| Cavalry | Forge |

Cavalry FC:
| GK | 1 | (Canada) Marco Carducci |
| RB | 4 | (Canada) Dominick Zator |
| CB | 14 | (England) Jay Wheeldon | (yellow card) 86' |
| CB | 5 | (Canada) Mason Trafford |
| LB | 3 | (England) Nathan Mavila | | (substituted off) 69' |
| CM | 8 | (Germany) Julian Büscher |
| CM | 6 | (Canada) Nik Ledgerwood (c) | (yellow card) 51' |
| RW | 17 | (Canada) Nico Pasquotti | (yellow card) 18' |
| AM | 10 | (Canada) Sergio Camargo | | (substituted off) 90' |
| LW | 9 | (England) Jordan Brown | | (substituted off) 73' |
| CF | 23 | (Republic of the Congo) Dominique Malonga |
Substitutes:
| GK | 22 | (Canada) Niko Giantsopoulos |
| FW | 7 | (Brazil) Oliver | | (substituted on) 73' |
| MF | 11 | (Honduras) José Escalante | (yellow card) 75' | (substituted on) 69' |
| MF | 16 | (England) Elijah Adekugbe |
| MF | 20 | (Colombia) Carlos Patiño |
| DF | 21 | (Canada) Malyk Hamilton |
| FW | 24 | (Canada) Aribim Pepple | | (substituted on) 90' |
Manager: (England) Tommy Wheeldon Jr.

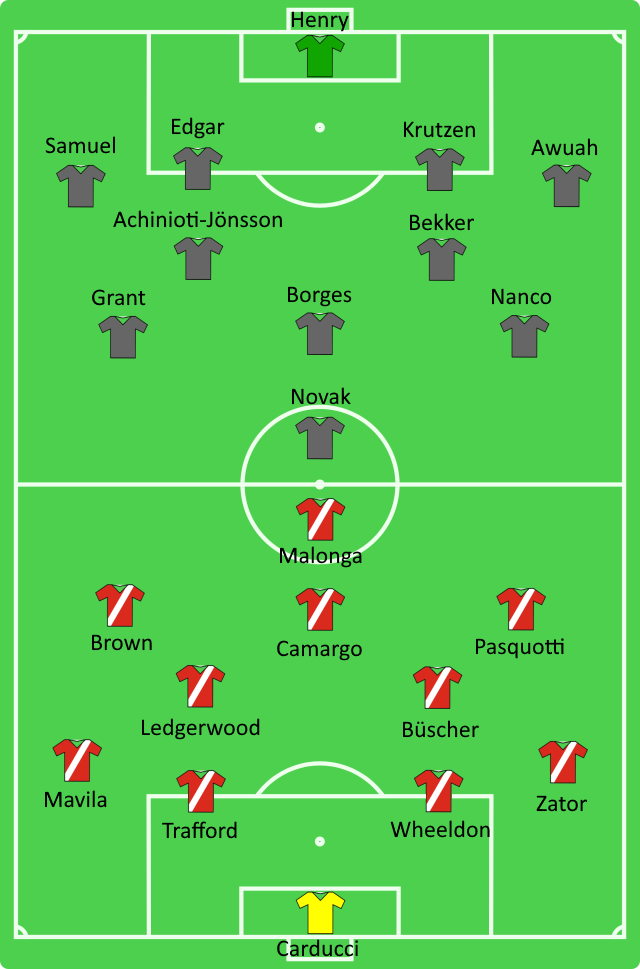

Forge FC:
| GK | 1 | (Canada) Triston Henry | (yellow card) 90+2' |
| RB | 4 | (Canada) Dominic Samuel |
| CB | 30 | (Canada) David Edgar |
| CB | 5 | (Belgium) Daniël Krutzen |
| LB | 6 | (Canada) Kwame Awuah |
| CM | 13 | (Sweden) Alexander Achinioti-Jönsson |
| CM | 10 | (Canada) Kyle Bekker (c) |
| RW | 2 | (Canada) Jonathan Grant | | (substituted off) 60' |
| AM | 19 | (Canada) Tristan Borges |
| LW | 11 | (Canada) Chris Nanco | | (substituted off) 67' |
| CF | 23 | (Canada) Anthony Novak | (yellow card) 42' | (substituted off) 86' |
Substitutes:
| GK | 18 | (Guyana) Quillan Roberts |
| MF | 3 | (Senegal) Elimane Cissé | | (substituted on) 60' |
| MF | 7 | (Canada) David Choinière | (yellow card) 73' | (substituted on) 67' |
| MF | 8 | (Canada) Giuliano Frano | | (substituted on) 86' |
| FW | 9 | (Canada) Marcel Zajac |
| FW | 17 | (Canada) Kadell Thomas |
| DF | 21 | (Cameroon) Bertrand Owundi |
Manager: (Canada) Bobby Smyrniotis

Man of the Match:
Daniël Krutzen (Forge FC)

Assistant referees:
Peter Pendli
Stefan Tanaka-Freundt
Fourth official:
Juan Marquez

== Broadcasting ==
First leg

- OneSoccer
- CBC Sports

Second leg

- OneSoccer

== See also ==
- 2019 Canadian Championship final
- Cavalry FC–Forge FC rivalry
