= 2019 Forge FC season =

First season in Canadian Premier League

Forge FC
2019 season
- Chairman: Bob Young
- Head coach: Bobby Smyrniotis
- Stadium: Tim Hortons Field
- Canadian Premier League: Spring: 2nd Fall: 2nd Overall: 2nd
- CPL Finals: Champions
- Canadian Championship: Second qualifying round
- CONCACAF League: Round of 16
- Top goalscorer: League: Tristan Borges (12 goals); All: Tristan Borges (13 goals)
- Highest home attendance: 17,611 vs. York9 FC (April 27, CPL)
- Lowest home attendance: 3,864 vs. Cavalry FC (October 16, CPL)
- Average home league attendance: 6,588
- Biggest win: 3–0 vs. Pacific FC (Home, May 8, CPL); 3–0 vs. Pacific FC (Home, September 28, CPL)
- Biggest defeat: 0–4 vs. York9 FC (Away, October 12, CPL)
Home colours	Away colours	Third colours

The 2019 Forge FC season was the first season in the club's history, as well as first season in Canadian Premier League history. On April 27, 2019, Forge FC hosted York9 FC in the inaugural CPL match at Tim Hortons Field. During the season, Forge also participated in the Canadian Championship, CONCACAF League, and the Canadian Premier League Finals.

On November 2, 2019, Forge FC defeated Cavalry FC 2–0 on aggregate in the CPL Finals and became the first ever champions of the Canadian Premier League. As champions, they qualified for the 2020 CONCACAF League.

== Squad ==
As of November 2, 2019.

No.	Name	Nationality	Position(s)	Date of birth (age)	Previous club
Goalkeepers
1	Triston Henry	(Canada)	GK	September 8, 1993 (aged 26)	(Canada) Sigma FC
18	Quillan Roberts	(Guyana)	GK	September 13, 1994 (aged 25)	(United States) Los Angeles FC
Defenders
2	Jonathan Grant	(Canada)	RB	October 15, 1993 (aged 26)	(Sweden) Nyköpings BIS
4	Dominic Samuel	(Canada)	RB / CB	September 29, 1994 (aged 25)	(Canada) Sigma FC
5	Daniël Krutzen	(Belgium)	CB / LB	September 19, 1996 (aged 23)	(United States) Reading United
6	Kwame Awuah	(Canada)	LB / CM	December 2, 1995 (aged 24)	(United States) New York City FC
15	Oluwaseun Oyegunle	(Canada)	DF	November 3, 2002 (aged 17)	(Canada) Sigma FC
16	Klaidi Cela	(Canada)	CB	July 16, 1999 (aged 20)	(Canada) Sigma FC
21	Bertrand Owundi	(Cameroon)	CB	October 15, 1993 (aged 26)	(United States) Minnesota United
22	Monti Mohsen	(Canada)	LB	June 13, 2000 (aged 19)	(Canada) Sigma FC
30	David Edgar	(Canada)	CB	May 19, 1987 (aged 32)	(England) Hartlepool United
Midfielders
3	Elimane Oumar Cissé	(Senegal)	CM	March 12, 1995 (aged 24)	(Senegal) Diambars FC
7	David Choinière	(Canada)	LW / RW	February 7, 1997 (aged 22)	(Canada) Montreal Impact
8	Giuliano Frano	(Canada)	CM / RB	May 16, 1993 (aged 26)	(Canada) Sigma FC
10	Kyle Bekker	(Canada)	AM / CM	September 2, 1990 (aged 29)	(United States) North Carolina FC
13	Alexander Achinioti-Jönsson	(Sweden)	DM	April 17, 1996 (aged 23)	(Sweden) IFK Värnamo
19	Tristan Borges	(Canada)	RW / LW / AM	August 26, 1998 (aged 21)	(Netherlands) SC Heerenveen
20	Justin Stoddart	(Canada)	MF	March 31, 1995 (aged 24)	(Canada) Sigma FC
Forwards
9	Marcel Zajac	(Canada)	ST	April 29, 1998 (aged 21)	(United States) Akron Zips
11	Chris Nanco	(Canada)	ST / RW / LW	February 15, 1995 (aged 24)	(United States) Bethlehem Steel
17	Kadell Thomas	(Canada)	ST / RW / LW	November 26, 1996 (aged 23)	(Canada) Sigma FC
23	Anthony Novak	(Canada)	ST	March 27, 1994 (aged 25)	(Canada) Oakville Blue Devils

== Transfers ==
=== In ===
==== Transferred in ====
No.	Pos.	Player	Transferred from	Fee/notes	Date	Source
10	MF	(Canada) Kyle Bekker	(United States) North Carolina FC	Free transfer	November 29, 2018	
11	FW	(Canada) Chris Nanco	(United States) Bethlehem Steel	Free transfer	November 29, 2018	
9	FW	(Canada) Marcel Zajac	(United States) Akron Zips	Free transfer	January 8, 2019	
19	MF	(Canada) Tristan Borges	(Netherlands) SC Heerenveen	Free transfer	January 10, 2019	
21	DF	(Cameroon) Bertrand Owundi	(United States) Minnesota United	Free transfer	January 17, 2019	
6	DF	(Canada) Kwame Awuah	(United States) New York City FC	Free transfer	January 29, 2019	
13	MF	(Sweden) Alexander Achinioti-Jönsson	(Sweden) IFK Värnamo	Free transfer	January 31, 2019	
8	MF	(Canada) Giuliano Frano	(Canada) Sigma FC	Free transfer	February 7, 2019	
4	DF	(Canada) Dominic Samuel	(Canada) Sigma FC	Free transfer	February 25, 2019	
1	GK	(Canada) Triston Henry	(Canada) Sigma FC	Free transfer	February 25, 2019	
2	DF	(Canada) Jonathan Grant	(Sweden) Nyköpings BIS	Free transfer	February 26, 2019	
3	MF	(Senegal) Elimane Oumar Cissé	(Senegal) Diambars FC	Free transfer	February 26, 2019	
18	GK	(Guyana) Quillan Roberts	(United States) Los Angeles FC	Free transfer	March 2, 2019	
22	DF	(Canada) Monti Mohsen	(Canada) Sigma FC	Free transfer	March 2, 2019	
5	DF	(Belgium) Daniël Krutzen	(United States) Reading United	Free transfer	March 2, 2019	
17	FW	(Canada) Kadell Thomas	(Canada) Sigma FC	Free transfer	March 2, 2019	
7	MF	(Canada) David Choinière	(Canada) Montreal Impact	Free transfer	March 7, 2019	
16	DF	(Canada) Klaidi Cela	(Canada) Sigma FC	Free transfer	April 3, 2019	
23	FW	(Canada) Anthony Novak	(Canada) Oakville Blue Devils	Free transfer	April 3, 2019	
12	FW	(Canada) Jace Kotsopoulos	(Canada) Guelph Gryphons	2018 CPL–U Sports Draft	May 16, 2019	
30	DF	(Canada) David Edgar	(England) Hartlepool United	Free transfer	August 2, 2019	
20	MF	(Canada) Justin Stoddart	(Canada) Sigma FC	Free transfer	September 15, 2019	
15	DF	(Canada) Oluwaseun Oyegunle	(Canada) Sigma FC	Signed to a Developmental Contract	September 15, 2019	

==== Loaned in ====
No.	Pos.	Player	Transferred from	Fee/notes	Date	Source
14	FW	(Guyana) Emery Welshman	(United States) FC Cincinnati	Recalled from loan on August 2	March 8, 2019	
31	GK	(Canada) Baj Maan	(Canada) Sigma FC	Signed to a Developmental Contract	June 11, 2019	
31	GK	(Canada) Luke Iacobellis	(Canada) Sigma FC	Signed to a Developmental Contract	September 4, 2019	

==== Draft picks ====
Forge FC selected the following players in the 2018 CPL–U Sports Draft on November 12, 2018. Draft picks are not automatically signed to the team roster. Only those who are signed to a contract will be listed as transfers in.

Round	Selection	Pos.	Player	Nationality	University
1	3	FW	Jace Kotsopoulos	Canada	Guelph Gryphons
2	12	MF	Aboubacar Sissoko	Mali	Montreal Carabins
3	17	MF	Marko Mandekic	Canada	Toronto Varsity Blues

=== Out ===
==== Transferred out ====
No.	Pos.	Player	Transferred to	Fee/notes	Date	Source
12	FW	(Canada) Jace Kotsopoulos	(Canada) Guelph Gryphons	Developmental Contract expired	August 15, 2019	
15	DF	(Canada) Oluwaseun Oyegunle		Developmental Contract expired	November 3, 2019	

== Club ==
=== Kits ===
On September 28, 2018, the Canadian Premier League announced that Canadian Soccer Business had signed a "long-term" deal on behalf of the league with Italian sporting apparel company Macron to be the official league kit provider, supplying the league's clubs with bespoke playing kits and training gear.

On April 5, 2019, Forge FC's home and away kits were unveiled alongside those of the CPL's other teams. The club later unveiled a black and gold third kit on May 30 to commemorate the sporting history of Hamilton.

Supplier: Macron / Sponsor: Tim Hortons

Home	Home Alt.	Away	Away Alt.	Third

== Pre-season ==
=== Matches ===
April 12 Friendly	Forge FC	2–0	Valour FC	Punta Cana, Dominican Republic
		Report

== Competitions ==
Match times are Eastern Daylight Time (UTC−4).

=== Overview ===
Competition	First match	Last match	Starting round	Final position	Record							
Competition	First match	Last match	Starting round	Final position	Pld	W	D	L	GF	GA	GD	Win %
CPL Spring season	April 27	June 26	Matchday 1	Runners-up	10	6	1	3	15	7	+8	60.00
CPL Fall season	July 6	October 16	Matchday 1	Runners-up	18	11	4	3	30	19	+11	61.11
Canadian Championship	June 4	June 11	Second qualifying round	Second qualifying round	2	0	1	1	2	3	−1	0.00
CONCACAF League	August 1	August 29	Preliminary round	Round of 16	4	2	1	1	4	5	−1	50.00
CPL Finals	October 26	November 2	Finals	Winners	2	2	0	0	2	0	+2	100.00
Total					36	21	7	8	53	34	+19	58.33

Source: Competitions

=== Canadian Premier League ===
==== Spring season ====
===== League table =====
Pos	Team	Pld	W	D	L	GF	GA	GD	Pts	Qualification
1	Cavalry	10	8	0	2	16	7	+9	24	2019 Canadian Premier League Finals
2	Forge	10	6	1	3	15	7	+8	19	2019 CONCACAF League preliminary round (Note: As winner of home and away matches between FC Edmonton, Forge FC, and Valour FC)
3	FC Edmonton	10	4	2	4	8	9	−1	14	
4	HFX Wanderers	10	3	2	5	8	11	−3	11	
5	Pacific	10	3	2	5	11	15	−4	11	
6	York9	10	2	5	3	9	11	−2	11	
7	Valour	10	3	0	7	8	15	−7	9	

Source: CanPL.ca
Rules for classification: 1) points; 2) total wins; 3) goal differential; 4) goals for; 5) away goal differential; 6) away goals for; 7) home goal differential; 8) home goals for; 9) coin toss or drawing of lots.

===== 2019 CONCACAF League qualification table =====
Pos	Team	Pld	W	D	L	GF	GA	GD	Pts	Qualification	FOR	FCE	VAL
1	Forge FC	4	3	0	1	6	2	+4	9	2019 CONCACAF League	—	2–0	2–1
2	FC Edmonton	4	2	0	2	3	4	−1	6		1–0	—	0–1
3	Valour FC	4	1	0	3	3	6	−3	3		0–2	1–2	—

Source: CanPL.ca
Rules for classification: 1) points; 2) total wins; 3) goal differential; 4) goals for; 5) away goal differential; 6) away goals for; 7) home goal differential; 8) home goals for; 9) coin toss or drawing of lots.

===== Results summary =====
Overall								Home						Away					
Pld	W	D	L	GF	GA	GD	Pts	W	D	L	GF	GA	GD	W	D	L	GF	GA	GD
10	6	1	3	15	7	+8	19	3	1	1	9	4	+5	3	0	2	6	3	+3

Last updated: June 26, 2019.
Source: canpl.ca

===== Results by match =====
Match	1	2	3	4	5	6	7	8	9	10
Ground	H	A	H	H	A	A	H	H	A	A
Result	D	L	W	L	W	W	W	W	W	L
Position	2	7	2	3	2	2	2	2	2	2

Updated to match(es) played on June 26, 2019. Source: #Matches
A = Away; H = Home; W = Win; D = Draw; L = Loss

===== Matches =====
April 27 1 Inaugural match	Forge FC	1–1	York9 FC	Hamilton, Ontario
1:00 pm	Frano (yellow card) 68'; Thomas 78'	Report	Telfer 3'; Aparicio (yellow card) 59' (yellow-red card) 90+5'	Stadium: Tim Hortons Field; Attendance: 17,611; Referee: David Gantar

May 4 2	HFX Wanderers FC	2–1	Forge FC	Halifax, Nova Scotia
1:00 pm	Garcia 30'; Langwa (yellow card) 38'; Bona (yellow card) 42'; N'sa (yellow card) 70'; Perea 82', (yellow card) 90+4'; Williams (yellow card) 90+2'	Report	Thomas 57'; Samuel (yellow card) 90+4'	Stadium: Wanderers Grounds; Attendance: 6,113; Referee: Marie-Soleil Beaudoin

May 8 3	Forge FC	3–0	Pacific FC	Hamilton, Ontario
7:00 pm	Novak 3'; Welshman 14'; Frano 70'; Samuel (yellow card) 88'	Report		Stadium: Tim Hortons Field; Attendance: 5,861; Referee: Filup Dujic

May 12 4	Forge FC	1–2	Cavalry FC	Hamilton, Ontario
1:00 pm	Borges 34'; Thomas (yellow card) 68'	Report	Ledgerwood 22'; Wheeldon (yellow card) 31'; Joel Waterman (yellow card) 81'; Pasquotti 90+5'	Stadium: Tim Hortons Field; Attendance: 5,912; Referee: Carol Anne Chenard

May 16 5 CONCACAF series	Valour FC	0–2	Forge FC	Winnipeg, Manitoba
8:00 pm	Garcia (yellow card) 18'	Report	Novak 8'; Zajac (yellow card) 31'; Borges 69'; Thomas (yellow card) 89'	Stadium: IG Field; Attendance: 4,731; Referee: Silviu Petrescu

May 25 6	York9 FC	0–2	Forge FC	Toronto, Ontario
4:00 pm	Gattas (yellow card) 67'; Gasparotto (yellow card) 90+3'	Report	Novak (yellow card) 64'; Nanco 70'; Borges 78'	Stadium: York Lions Stadium; Attendance: 4,260; Referee: Yusri Rudolf
Note: Match was delayed in the 62nd minute for 75 minutes due to lightning.

May 29 7 CONCACAF series	Forge FC	2–0	FC Edmonton	Hamilton, Ontario
7:00 pm	Borges 35' (pen.); Krutzen 70'	Report	Moses (yellow card) 54'; Diouck (yellow card) 80'; Temguia (yellow card) 90+3'	Stadium: Tim Hortons Field; Attendance: 6,019; Referee: Mathieu Souare

June 15 8 CONCACAF series	Forge FC	2–1	Valour FC	Hamilton, Ontario
5:00 pm	Samuel (yellow card) 31'; Bekker (yellow card) 76'; Kotsopoulos 84'; Murrell 90' (o.g.)	Report	Bustos 1'; Béland-Goyette (yellow card) 53'; Ohin (yellow card) 64'	Stadium: Tim Hortons Field; Attendance: 7,152; Referee: Alain Ruch

June 22 9	Cavalry FC	0–1	Forge FC	Foothills County, Alberta
6:00 pm		Report	Bekker 5' (yellow card) 87'; Owundi (yellow card) 38'; Samuel (yellow card) 40'; Thomas (yellow card) 89'	Stadium: Spruce Meadows; Attendance: 4,697; Referee: Silviu Petrescu

June 26 10 CONCACAF series	FC Edmonton	1–0	Forge FC	Edmonton, Alberta
9:00 pm	Diouck 16'	Report	Owundi (yellow card) 64'	Stadium: Clarke Stadium; Attendance: 2,321; Referee: Yusri Rudolf

==== Fall season ====
===== League table =====
Pos	Team	Pld	W	D	L	GF	GA	GD	Pts	Qualification
1	Cavalry	18	11	5	2	35	12	+23	38	2019 Canadian Premier League Finals
2	Forge	18	11	4	3	30	19	+11	37	
3	York9	18	7	2	9	30	26	+4	23	
4	Pacific	18	5	5	8	24	31	−7	20	
5	Valour	18	5	4	9	22	37	−15	19	
6	FC Edmonton	18	4	6	8	19	24	−5	18	
7	HFX Wanderers	18	3	8	7	13	24	−11	17	

Source: CanPL.ca
Rules for classification: 1) points; 2) total wins; 3) goal differential; 4) goals for; 5) away goal differential; 6) away goals for; 7) home goal differential; 8) home goals for; 9) coin toss or drawing of lots.

===== Results summary =====
Overall								Home						Away					
Pld	W	D	L	GF	GA	GD	Pts	W	D	L	GF	GA	GD	W	D	L	GF	GA	GD
18	11	4	3	30	19	+11	37	7	1	1	16	6	+10	4	3	2	14	13	+1

Last updated: October 16, 2019.
Source: canpl.ca

===== Results by match =====
Match	1	2	3	4	5	6	7	8	9	10	11	12	13	14	15	16	17	18
Ground	H	A	H	H	A	A	H	A	H	A	H	A	H	A	H	A	A	H
Result	L	W	W	W	D	W	W	D	W	W	D	D	W	W	W	L	L	W
Position	6	3	1	1	1	1	1	2	1	1	1	1	1	1	1	2	2	1

Updated to match(es) played on October 16, 2019. Source: #Matches
A = Away; H = Home; W = Win; D = Draw; L = Loss

===== Matches =====
July 6 1	Forge FC	1–2	FC Edmonton	Hamilton, Ontario
1:00 pm	Kotsopoulos 57'; Owundi (yellow card) 61'	Report	Ameobi 38'; Henry 72' (o.g.); Marcelin (yellow card) 89'	Stadium: Tim Hortons Field; Attendance: 6,086; Referee: David Barrie

July 13 2	Pacific FC	2–3	Forge FC	Langford, British Columbia
6:00 pm	Legault (yellow card) 5'; Campbell 49'; Blasco 85'; Hernández (yellow card) 87'; Fisk (yellow card) 90+3'	Report	Zajac (yellow card) 12'; Borges 47', 79'; Welshman (yellow card) 50' (goal) 54'	Stadium: Westhills Stadium; Attendance: 2,604; Referee: Mathieu Souaré

July 17 3	Forge FC	2–0	HFX Wanderers FC	Hamilton, Ontario
7:00 pm	Bekker 36'; Borges 40' (yellow card) 89'; Henry (yellow card) 86'	Report	Garcia (yellow card) 32'	Stadium: Tim Hortons Field; Attendance: 5,631; Referee: David Barrie

July 20 4	Forge FC	3–1	Valour FC	Hamilton, Ontario
3:30 pm	Frano (yellow card) 16'; Cissé 32'; Welshman 37' (pen.); Awuah (yellow card) 55'; Thomas (yellow card) 90+4' (goal) 90+4'	Report	Attardo 49'	Stadium: Tim Hortons Field; Attendance: 5,446; Referee: Scott Bowman

July 27 5	FC Edmonton	1–1	Forge FC	Edmonton, Alberta
6:00 pm	Ongaro 89'	Report	Bekker 86'	Stadium: Clarke Stadium; Attendance: 2,021; Referee: Filip Dujic
Note: Kickoff was delayed 10-minutes due to a thunderstorm.

August 17 6	Valour FC	1–3	Forge FC	Winnipeg, Manitoba
6:00 pm	Petrasso 76' (pen.)	Report	Novak 30', 73'; Frano (yellow card) 51'; Grant (yellow card) 75'; Nanco 77'	Stadium: IG Field; Attendance: 4,944; Referee: Fabrizio Stasolla

August 25 7	Forge FC	1–0	Cavalry FC	Hamilton, Ontario
3:30 pm	Frano (yellow card) 48'; Grant 79' (yellow card) 81'	Report	Adekugbe (yellow card) 71'	Stadium: Tim Hortons Field; Attendance: 6,883; Referee: David Barrie

September 4 8	Pacific FC	1–1	Forge FC	Langford, British Columbia
10:00 pm	Campbell 79'	Report	Mohsen 31' (yellow card) 67'	Stadium: Westhills Stadium; Attendance: 2,124; Referee: Juan Marquez

September 8 9	Forge FC	2–1	York9 FC	Hamilton, Ontario
1:00 pm	Borges 21'; Zajac 52'	Report	Doner (yellow card) 38'; Murofushi 65' (pen.)	Stadium: Tim Hortons Field; Attendance: 5,267; Referee: Yusri Rudolf
Note: Originally scheduled for August 2, 7:00 pm

September 12 10	Valour FC	1–3	Forge FC	Winnipeg, Manitoba
8:00 pm	Bustos (yellow card) 19'; Mitter (red card) 26'; Carreiro (yellow card) 33'; Attardo 70'	Report	Novak 15'; Nanco 16'; Borges 27' (pen.); Frano (yellow card) 37'	Stadium: IG Field; Attendance: 3,586; Referee: Serge Topalian

September 15 11	Forge FC	2–2	HFX Wanderers FC	Hamilton, Ontario
1:00 pm	Awuah (yellow card) 55'; Nanco 69'; Borges 81'	Report	Garcia 48'; Gutiérrez 58'; Langwa (yellow card) 79'	Stadium: Tim Hortons Field; Attendance: 6,016; Referee: Fabrizio Stasolla

September 18 12	HFX Wanderers FC	1–1	Forge FC	Halifax, Nova Scotia
5:30 pm	Garcia 43'; Tomasz Skublak (yellow card) 90+4'	Report	Edgar (yellow card) 53' (goal) 90+3'	Stadium: Wanderers Grounds; Attendance: 5,824; Referee: Myriam Marcotte
Note: Originally scheduled for August 21, 6:00 pm

September 28 13	Forge FC	3–0	Pacific FC	Hamilton, Ontario
3:30 pm	Samuel (yellow card) 34'; Henry (yellow card) 41'; Bekker 45'; Novak (yellow card) 54'; Cissé 73'; Borges 76' (yellow card) 90+1'; Awuah (yellow card) 82'	Report	Smith (yellow card) 82'	Stadium: Tim Hortons Field; Attendance: 5,616; Referee: Pierre-Luc Lauzière

October 2 14	FC Edmonton	0–1	Forge FC	Edmonton, Alberta
9:00 pm		Report	Cela 26'	Stadium: Clarke Stadium; Attendance: 2,042; Referee: David Barrie

October 6 15	Forge FC	1–0	York9 FC	Hamilton, Ontario
3:30 pm	Borges 71' (pen.); Zajac (yellow card) 90+3'	Report	Di Chiara (yellow card) 69'; Springer (yellow card) 74'	Stadium: Tim Hortons Field; Attendance: 4,864; Referee: Fabrizio Stasolla

October 9 16	Cavalry FC	2–1	Forge FC	Foothills County, Alberta
7:00 pm	Oliver (yellow card) 15'; Malonga 63', 84'; Pasquotti (yellow card) 88'	Report	Frano (yellow card) 45+1'; Novak (yellow card) 47' (goal) 78'; Owundi (yellow card) 66'; Nanco (yellow card) 90+3'	Stadium: ATCO Field; Attendance: 1,938; Referee: Silviu Petrescu
Note: Originally scheduled for July 30, 9:00 pm

October 12 17	York9 FC	4–0	Forge FC	Toronto, Ontario
3:30 pm	Di Chiara 22' (pen.); Adjei 57'; Abzi 66'; Gattas 90'	Report		Stadium: York Lions Stadium; Attendance: 2,314; Referee: Filip Dujic
Note: Originally scheduled for August 28, 7:00 pm

October 16 18	Forge FC	1–0	Cavalry FC	Hamilton, Ontario
7:00 pm	Choinière 42'; Samuel (yellow card) 64' (yellow-red card) 71'	Report	Hamilton (yellow card) 36'; Büscher (yellow card) 74'	Stadium: Tim Hortons Field; Attendance: 3,864; Referee: Juan Marquez

=== CPL finals ===
Forge qualified for the CPL finals on September 28. The CPL announced the match schedule on September 30.

October 26 First leg	Forge FC	1–0	Cavalry FC	Hamilton, Ontario
4:00 pm	Borges 45+1', (red card) 69'; Awuah (yellow card) 63'	Report	Oliver (yellow card) 24'; Waterman (red card) 37'; Wheeldon (yellow card) 69'; Trafford (yellow card) 75'; Ledgerwood (yellow card) 88'	Stadium: Tim Hortons Field; Attendance: 10,486; Referee: Pierre-Luc Lauzière
Note: Borges' red card was rescinded by Canada Soccer's Disciplinary Committee.

November 2 Second leg	Cavalry FC	0–1 (0–2 agg.)	Forge FC	Foothills County, Alberta
3:30 pm	Pasquotti (yellow card) 18'; Ledgerwood (yellow card) 51'; Escalante (yellow card) 75'; Wheeldon (yellow card) 86'	Report	Novak (yellow card) 42'; Choinière (yellow card) 73', (goal) 90+5'; Henry (yellow card) 90+2'	Stadium: ATCO Field; Attendance: 5,831; Referee: Alain Ruch

=== Canadian Championship ===
The Canadian Soccer Association announced the format of the 2019 Canadian Championship on January 10; the draw results were announced on February 12. Forge entered the competition in the second round.

June 4 Second qualifying round Leg 1	Forge FC	1–1	Cavalry FC	Hamilton, Ontario
7:30 pm	Welshman 48'; Achinioti-Jönsson (yellow card) 68'; Frano (yellow card) 84'; Roberts (red card) 90+4'	Report	Mavila (yellow card) 40'; Malonga 90+6' (pen.)	Stadium: Tim Hortons Field; Attendance: 5,174; Referee: David Barrie

June 11 Second qualifying round Leg 2	Cavalry FC	2–1 (3–2 agg.)	Forge FC	Foothills County, Alberta
9:30 pm	Malonga 41'; Camargo 58'; Escalante (yellow card) 59'; Mavila (yellow card) 60'; Giantsopoulos (yellow card) 90+6'	Report	Bekker 13'; Krutzen (yellow card) 68'	Stadium: ATCO Field; Attendance: 4,000; Referee: Pierre-Luc Lauziere

=== CONCACAF League ===
CONCACAF conducted the CONCACAF League draw on May 30, before Forge had qualified for the competition.

==== Preliminary round ====
The preliminary round schedule was announced on June 10.

August 1 First leg	Forge FC (Canada)	2–1	(Guatemala) Antigua GFC	Hamilton, Ontario
6:00 pm	Krutzen 46'; Owundi (yellow card) 61'; Choinière 90+1'	Report	Pacheco 33'	Stadium: Tim Hortons Field; Attendance: 4,644; Referee: Juan Gabriel Calderón (Costa Rica)

August 8 Second leg	Antigua GFC (Guatemala)	0–0 (1–2 agg.)	(Canada) Forge FC	Guatemala City, Guatemala
8:00 pm	Mingorance (yellow card) 46' (yellow-red card) 86'	Report	Henry (yellow card) 45'; Borges (yellow card) 47'	Stadium: Estadio Doroteo Guamuch Flores; Referee: Randy Solano (Dominican Republic)

==== Round of 16 ====
The round of 16 schedule was announced on August 9.

August 22 First leg	Forge FC (Canada)	1–0	(Honduras) Olimpia	Hamilton, Ontario
8:00 pm	Nanco 4'; Frano (yellow card) 22'	Report		Stadium: Tim Hortons Field; Attendance: 4,876; Referee: José Raúl Torres (Puerto Rico)

August 29 Second leg	Olimpia (Honduras)	4–1 (4–2 agg.)	(Canada) Forge FC	San Pedro Sula, Honduras
10:00 pm	Ferrari 30'; Flores 42'; Lacayo 75'; Bengtson 79'	Report	Choinière 88'	Stadium: Estadio Olímpico Metropolitano; Attendance: 0 Referee: Henry Bejarano (Costa Rica)
Note: The match was played behind closed doors in San Pedro Sula as punishment following rioting between fans of Olimpia and Motagua that caused multiple fatalities and injuries on August 17.

== Statistics ==
=== Squad and statistics ===
As of 2 November 2019

No.	Pos	Nat	Player	Total		CPL Spring season		CPL Fall season		CPL Finals		Canadian Championship		CONCACAF League	
No.	Pos	Nat	Player	Apps	Goals	Apps	Goals	Apps	Goals	Apps	Goals	Apps	Goals	Apps	Goals
1	GK	(Canada) CAN	Triston Henry	27	0	8+0	0	12+0	0	2+0	0	1+0	0	4+0	0
2	DF	(Canada) CAN	Jonathan Grant	16	1	1+0	0	10+1	1	1+0	0	0+0	0	3+0	0
3	MF	(Senegal) SEN	Elimane Oumar Cissé	27	2	10+0	0	10+1	2	1+1	0	2+0	0	2+0	0
4	DF	(Canada) CAN	Dominic Samuel	33	0	10+0	0	15+1	0	1+0	0	2+0	0	4+0	0
5	DF	(Belgium) BEL	Daniël Krutzen	34	2	9+0	1	16+1	0	2+0	0	2+0	0	4+0	1
6	DF	(Canada) CAN	Kwame Awuah	32	0	8+2	0	12+3	0	2+0	0	1+1	0	3+0	0
7	MF	(Canada) CAN	David Choinière	23	4	3+3	0	8+2	1	0+2	1	2+0	0	1+2	2
8	MF	(Canada) CAN	Giuliano Frano	31	1	7+1	1	12+4	0	1+1	0	2+0	0	2+1	0
9	FW	(Canada) CAN	Marcel Zajac	26	1	2+6	0	10+3	1	0+1	0	0+1	0	1+2	0
10	MF	(Canada) CAN	Kyle Bekker	34	5	8+0	1	17+1	3	2+0	0	2+0	1	4+0	0
11	FW	(Canada) CAN	Chris Nanco	29	5	4+5	1	9+6	3	2+0	0	0+1	0	2+0	1
13	MF	(Sweden) SWE	Alexander Achinioti-Jönsson	29	0	9+1	0	9+4	0	2+0	0	2+0	0	2+0	0
15	DF	(Canada) CAN	Oluwaseun Oyegunle	1	0	0+0	0	0+1	0	0+0	0	0+0	0	0+0	0
16	DF	(Canada) CAN	Klaidi Cela	10	1	0+1	0	3+4	1	0+0	0	0+1	0	0+1	0
17	FW	(Canada) CAN	Kadell Thomas	19	3	2+5	2	3+4	1	0+1	0	0+1	0	0+3	0
18	GK	(Guyana) GUY	Quillan Roberts	9	0	2+0	0	6+0	0	0+0	0	1+0	0	0+0	0
19	MF	(Canada) CAN	Tristan Borges	33	13	8+1	4	12+4	8	2+0	1	2+0	0	4+0	0
20	MF	(Canada) CAN	Justin Stoddart	1	0	0+0	0	0+1	0	0+0	0	0+0	0	0+0	0
21	DF	(Cameroon) CMR	Bertrand Owundi	26	0	8+1	0	11+2	0	0+0	0	2+0	0	2+0	0
22	DF	(Canada) CAN	Monti Mohsen	9	1	0+2	0	4+3	1	0+0	0	0+0	0	0+0	0
23	FW	(Canada) CAN	Anthony Novak	22	6	5+0	2	7+4	4	2+0	0	0+0	0	3+1	0
30	DF	(Canada) CAN	David Edgar	14	1	0+0	0	7+2	1	2+0	0	0+0	0	2+1	0
Player(s) transferred out during this season
12	FW	(Canada) CAN	Jace Kotsopoulos	5	2	0+2	1	1+0	1	0+0	0	0+1	0	0+1	0
14	FW	(Guyana) GUY	Emery Welshman	13	4	6+0	1	5+0	2	0+0	0	1+0	1	1+0	0

=== Top scorers ===
Rank	Nat.	Player	Pos.	CPL Spring season	CPL Fall season	CPL Finals	Canadian Championship	CONCACAF League	Total
1	(Canada)	Tristan Borges	MF	4	8	1	0	0	13
2	(Canada)	Anthony Novak	FW	2	4	0	0	0	6
3	(Canada)	Kyle Bekker	MF	1	3	0	1	0	5
3	(Canada)	Chris Nanco	FW	1	3	0	0	1	5
5	(Canada)	David Choinière	MF	0	1	1	0	2	4
5	(Guyana)	Emery Welshman	FW	1	2	0	1	0	4
7	(Canada)	Kadell Thomas	FW	2	1	0	0	0	3
8	(Senegal)	Elimane Oumar Cissé	MF	0	2	0	0	0	2
8	(Canada)	Jace Kotsopoulos	FW	1	1	0	0	0	2
8	(Belgium)	Daniël Krutzen	DF	1	0	0	0	1	2
11	(Canada)	Klaidi Cela	DF	0	1	0	0	0	1
11	(Canada)	David Edgar	DF	0	1	0	0	0	1
11	(Canada)	Giuliano Frano	MF	1	0	0	0	0	1
11	(Canada)	Jonathan Grant	DF	0	1	0	0	0	1
11	(Canada)	Monti Mohsen	DF	0	1	0	0	0	1
11	(Canada)	Marcel Zajac	FW	0	1	0	0	0	1
Own goals				1	0	0	0	0	1
Totals				15	30	2	2	4	54

Updated to match played November 2, 2019
Source: Canadian Premier League

=== Top assists ===
Rank	Nat.	Player	Pos.	CPL Spring season	CPL Fall season	CPL Finals	Canadian Championship	CONCACAF League	Total
1	(Canada)	Kwame Awuah	DF	2	3	0	0	1	6
2	(Canada)	Kyle Bekker	MF	3	2	0	0	0	5
2	(Canada)	Tristan Borges	MF	1	4	0	0	0	5
4	(Canada)	David Choinière	MF	1	0	0	3	0	4
4	(Canada)	Anthony Novak	FW	0	3	0	0	1	4
6	(Canada)	Marcel Zajac	FW	1	2	0	0	0	3
7	(Sweden)	Alexander Achinioti-Jönsson	MF	1	1	0	0	0	2
7	(Senegal)	Elimane Oumar Cissé	MF	0	1	1	0	0	2
7	(Belgium)	Daniël Krutzen	DF	2	0	0	0	0	2
7	(Canada)	Chris Nanco	FW	0	1	1	0	0	2
7	(Guyana)	Emery Welshman	FW	2	0	0	0	0	2
12	(Canada)	Klaidi Cela	DF	0	1	0	0	0	1
12	(Canada)	Giuliano Frano	MF	0	0	0	0	1	1
12	(Canada)	Jonathan Grant	DF	0	1	0	0	0	1
12	(Canada)	Dominic Samuel	DF	0	1	0	0	0	1
12	(Canada)	Kadell Thomas	FW	0	1	0	0	0	1
Totals				13	22	2	2	3	43

Updated to match played November 2, 2019
Source: Canadian Premier League

=== Clean sheets ===
Rank	Nat.	Player	CPL Spring season	CPL Fall season	CPL Finals	Canadian Championship	CONCACAF League	Total
1	(Canada)	Triston Henry	4	3	2	0	2	11
2	(Guyana)	Quillan Roberts	1	3	0	0	0	4
Totals			5	6	2	0	2	15

Updated to match played November 2, 2019
Source: Canadian Premier League

=== Disciplinary record ===
No.	Pos.	Nat.	Player	CPL Spring season		CPL Fall season		CPL Finals		Canadian Championship		CONCACAF League		Total	
No.	Pos.	Nat.	Player	Yellow card	Red card	Yellow card	Red card	Yellow card	Red card	Yellow card	Red card	Yellow card	Red card	Yellow card	Red card
1	GK	(Canada)	Triston Henry	0	0	2	0	1	0	0	0	2	0	5	0
2	DF	(Canada)	Jonathan Grant	0	0	2	0	0	0	0	0	0	0	2	0
4	DF	(Canada)	Dominic Samuel	4	0	1	1	0	0	0	0	0	0	5	1
5	DF	(Belgium)	Daniël Krutzen	0	0	0	0	0	0	1	0	0	0	1	0
6	DF	(Canada)	Kwame Awuah	0	0	3	0	1	0	0	0	0	0	4	0
7	MF	(Canada)	David Choinière	0	0	0	0	1	0	0	0	0	0	1	0
8	MF	(Canada)	Giuliano Frano	1	0	4	0	0	0	1	0	1	0	7	0
9	FW	(Canada)	Marcel Zajac	1	0	2	0	0	0	0	0	0	0	3	0
10	MF	(Canada)	Kyle Bekker	2	0	0	0	0	0	0	0	0	0	2	0
11	FW	(Canada)	Chris Nanco	0	0	1	0	0	0	0	0	0	0	1	0
13	MF	(Sweden)	Alexander Achinioti-Jönsson	0	0	0	0	0	0	1	0	0	0	1	0
14	FW	(Guyana)	Emery Welshman	0	0	1	0	0	0	0	0	0	0	1	0
17	FW	(Canada)	Kadell Thomas	3	0	1	0	0	0	0	0	0	0	4	0
18	GK	(Guyana)	Quillan Roberts	0	0	0	0	0	0	0	1	0	0	0	1
19	MF	(Canada)	Tristan Borges	0	0	2	0	0	1	0	0	1	0	3	1
21	DF	(Cameroon)	Bertrand Owundi	2	0	2	0	0	0	0	0	1	0	5	0
22	DF	(Canada)	Monti Mohsen	0	0	1	0	0	0	0	0	0	0	1	0
23	FW	(Canada)	Anthony Novak	1	0	2	0	1	0	0	0	0	0	4	0
30	DF	(Canada)	David Edgar	0	0	1	0	0	0	0	0	0	0	1	0
Totals				14	0	25	1	4	1	3	1	5	0	51	3

Updated to match played November 2, 2019
Source: Canadian Premier League

== Honours ==
=== Canadian Premier League Awards ===
Name	Award	Status	Source
Tristan Borges	Golden Boot	Won	
Tristan Borges	Under 21 Canadian Player of the Year	Won	
Tristan Borges	Player of the Year	Won	
Kyle Bekker	Player of the Year	Nominated	
Bobby Smyrniotis	Coach of the Year	Nominated	

== Sources ==
- Bedakian, Armen (December 23, 2019). "Forge FC: 3 key performers of 2019". Canadian Premier League. Archived from the original on September 24, 2020.
- Bedakian, Armen (December 23, 2019). "Forge FC: 2019 season in review". Canadian Premier League. Archived from the original on September 24, 2020.
- "2019 Inaugural Season Media Guide" (PDF). Forge FC. April 7, 2020. Archived (PDF) from the original on October 3, 2023.
