= 2017 League1 Ontario season =

League1 Ontario Men's Division
- Season: 2017
- Champions: Oakville Blue Devils
- Cup champions: Woodbridge Strikers
- Matches: 175
- Goals: 722 (4.13 per match)
- Top goalscorer: Jarek Whiteman (29 goals)
- Best goalkeeper: Quillan Roberts (0.79 GAA)
- Biggest home win: 11 goals: Oakville 11–0 Windsor (20 August); TFC III 11–0 Windsor (10 September)
- Biggest away win: 10 goals: ProStars 1–11 Vaughan (15 July)
- Highest scoring: 12 goals: ProStars 1–11 Vaughan (15 July)

The 2017 Men's League1 Ontario season was the fourth season of play for League1 Ontario, a Division 3 semi-professional soccer league in the Canadian soccer pyramid and the highest level of soccer based in the Canadian province of Ontario.

For the first time, the league expanded to include teams in the nation's capital, Ottawa, allowing it to span from the western to eastern borders of southern Ontario.

== Changes from 2016 ==
The men's division remained at 16 teams for this season, with the addition of Ottawa South United and the departure of the Kingston Clippers.

Toronto FC Academy renamed itself to Toronto FC III, as its parent club (Toronto FC) withdrew their squad from the Premier Development League. Aurora United FC was also renamed to Aurora FC.

Starting this year, the league champion was granted a place in the next year's Canadian Championship. As a result, the Inter-Provincial Cup was discontinued.

== Teams ==
Team	City	Principal Stadium	Alternate Stadium	Founded	First season	Head coach (Note: Unless otherwise noted, this information was obtained from team directories on the league website)
Western Conference
FC London	London	German Canadian FC Stadium	(None)	2008	2016	Dom Kosic
North Mississauga SC	Mississauga	Hershey Centre	(None)	1982	2016	Jhon Ardila
Oakville Blue Devils	Oakville	Sheridan Trafalgar Stadium	Bronte Athletic Park	1994	2015	(England) Duncan Wilde
ProStars FC	Brampton	Victoria Park Stadium	Terry Fox Park	2015	2015	(Hungary) Josef Komlodi
Sanjaxx Lions	Toronto	Monarch Park Stadium	(None)	2012	2015	Laza Lowe
Sigma FC	Mississauga	Hershey Centre	(None)	2005	2014	(Canada) Bobby Smyrniotis
Toronto FC III	Toronto (North York)	KIA Training Ground	(None)	2008	2014	(England) Danny Dichio
Windsor TFC	Windsor	Lajeunesse High School	University of Windsor Stadium (Note: Windsor TFC Stars played one home match against Ottawa South United Force at Varsity Stadium)	2004	2014	Zibby Piatkiewicz
Eastern Conference
Aurora FC	Aurora	St. Maximillion Kolbe	(None)	1964	2016	Derek O'Keefe
Durham United FA	Pickering	Kinsmen Park	Pickering Soccer Complex	2014	2014	(Canada) Sanford Carabin
Master's Futbol	Toronto (Scarborough)	L'Amoreaux Park	(None)	2012	2014	Andre Savelev
North Toronto Nitros	Toronto	Varsity Stadium	Downsview Park	1980	2016	(Cameroon) Hermann Kingué
Ottawa South United Force	Ottawa	Terry Fox Stadium	MNP Park (Carleton University)	2003	2017	Traian Mateas
Toronto Skillz FC	Toronto (Scarborough)	Birchmount Stadium	L'Amoreaux Park	2008	2016	(Trinidad and Tobago) Leslie Fitzpatrick
Vaughan Azzurri	Vaughan	McNaughton Park	(None)	1982	2014	(Canada) Carmine Isacco
Woodbridge Strikers	Vaughan (Woodbridge)	Vaughan Grove	(None)	1976	2014	(Canada) Peter Pinizzotto

Location of Men's Division teams for the 2017 League1 Ontario season.
Western Conference
Eastern Conference
See Toronto inset
Location of Men's Division teams in or near Toronto for the 2017 League1 Ontario season.
Western Conference
Eastern Conference

== Standings ==
Each team will play 22 matches as part of the season; two against every team in their own conference, and one against every team in the opposing conference. The top team from each conference will meet at the end of the season to determine the league champion. The champion will enter the 2018 Canadian Championship.

=== Eastern Conference ===
Pos	Team	Pld	W	D	L	GF	GA	GD	Pts	Qualification
1	Woodbridge Strikers (X)	22	15	5	2	46	18	+28	50	League Championship
2	Vaughan Azzurri	22	16	1	5	75	23	+52	49	
3	Durham United FA	22	11	3	8	51	27	+24	36 (Note: Durham United FA and North Toronto Nitros tied on head-to-head points (3–3) and head-to-head goal differential (4–4).)	
3	North Toronto Nitros	22	11	3	8	55	35	+20	36	
5	Master's Futbol	22	9	3	10	39	49	−10	30	
6	Ottawa South United	21	6	1	14	40	63	−23	19	
7	Toronto Skillz FC	22	4	0	18	26	69	−43	12	
8	Aurora FC	21	2	2	17	23	72	−49	8	

Source: http://www.league1ontario.com/page/show/2309115-standings
Rules for classification: 1) points; 2) total wins; 3) head-to-head points; 4) head-to-head goal differential; 5) playoff match
(X) L1 Cup winner

=== Western Conference ===
Pos	Team	Pld	W	D	L	GF	GA	GD	Pts	Qualification
1	Oakville Blue Devils (C, O)	22	18	2	2	62	22	+40	56	League Championship
2	Sigma FC	22	17	4	1	76	20	+56	55	
3	Toronto FC III	22	14	3	5	73	30	+43	45	
4	FC London	22	11	5	6	54	38	+16	38	
5	North Mississauga SC	22	9	2	11	38	38	0	29	
6	Windsor TFC	22	6	4	12	30	67	−37	22	
7	Sanjaxx Lions	22	4	3	15	18	61	−43	15	
8	ProStars FC	22	1	1	20	16	90	−74	4	

Source: http://www.league1ontario.com/page/show/2309115-standings
Rules for classification: 1) points; 2) total wins; 3) head-to-head points; 4) head-to-head goal differential; 5) playoff match
(C) Champion and qualification to 2018 Canadian Championship; (O) Play-off winners

=== League Championship ===
The league champion is determined by a single-match series between the top-ranked teams from the western and eastern conferences. The winner qualifies for the 2018 Canadian Championship.

October 20, 2017	Woodbridge Strikers	1–1 (2–4 p)	Oakville Blue Devils	Vaughan, Ontario
7:30 pm	Nunes 11'	Report	Duarte 66'	Stadium: Ontario Soccer Centre; Attendance: 1,200; Referee: Fabrizio Stasollo
	Penalties
	Isaac (penalty scored); Baldassarre (penalty scored); Fayehun (penalty missed); Paredes-Proctor (penalty missed)		(penalty scored) Vilela; (penalty missed) Gallo; (penalty scored) T. McNamara; (penalty scored) Ademolu; (penalty scored) Culver

== Cup ==
The cup tournament is a separate contest from the rest of the season, in which all sixteen teams from the men's division take part. It is not a form of playoffs at the end of the season (as is typically seen in North American sports), but is more like the Canadian Championship or the FA Cup, albeit only for League1 Ontario teams. All matches are separate from the regular season, and are not reflected in the season standings.

The cup tournament for the men's division is a single-match knockout tournament with four total rounds culminating in a final match in the start of August, with initial matchups determined by random draw. Each match in the tournament must return a result; any match drawn after 90 minutes will advance directly to kicks from the penalty mark instead of extra time.

First Round
Toronto FC III	1
Sigma FC	0
North Mississauga SC	2
Windsor TFC	0
FC London	2
Aurora FC	0
Woodbridge Strikers	1 (5)
Sanjaxx Lions	1 (4)
Durham United FA	1
Oakville Blue Devils	0
Ottawa South United	4
ProStars FC	3
Toronto Skillz FC	2
Vaughan Azzurri	8
Master's Futbol	3
North Toronto Nitros	2

Quarterfinals
Toronto FC III	0
North Mississauga SC	1
FC London	0
Woodbridge Strikers	3
Durham United FA	3
Ottawa South United	1
Vaughan Azzurri	6
Master's Futbol	1

Semifinals
North Mississauga SC	1
Woodbridge Strikers	2
Durham United FA	1 (2)
Vaughan Azzurri	1 (4)

Final
Woodbridge Strikers	3
Vaughan Azzurri	1

=== First Round ===
May 24, 2017	Toronto FC III	1–0	Sigma FC	Toronto, Ontario
8:00 pm	Rollocks 14'	Report		Stadium: Downsview Park

May 31, 2017	North Mississauga SC	2–0	Windsor TFC	Mississauga, Ontario
7:30 pm	Fenton 11', 12'	Report		Stadium: Hershey Centre

May 31, 2017	FC London	2–0	Aurora FC	London, Ontario
9:00 pm	Gee 29', 59'	Report		Stadium: German-Canadian Club of London Field

May 16, 2017	Sanjaxx Lions	1–1 (4–5 p)	Woodbridge Strikers	Toronto, Ontario
9:00 pm	Charles (yellow card) 45'; Downey 46'; Serrao (yellow card) 75'	Report	Baker (yellow card) 45'; Carreiro 52'	Stadium: Monarch Park Stadium

May 31, 2017	Durham United FA	1–0	Oakville Blue Devils	Pickering, Ontario
7:00 pm	Moncrieffe 50'	Report		Stadium: Kinsmen Park

May 31, 2017	ProStars FC	3–4	Ottawa South United	Vaughan, Ontario
7:00 pm	A. Rahman 64', 90'; Dyer 83'	Report	Cornwall 19', 23'; Soukary 47'; Sanchez Caicedo 80'	Stadium: Ontario Soccer Centre

May 9, 2017	Toronto Skillz FC	2–8	Vaughan Azzurri	Toronto, Ontario
8:00 pm	Dimitriu (yellow card) 23'; Wong 53'; Jeyathilaka (yellow card) 61'; Ramalho 80'	Report	Jason Mills 34'; Skublak 39', 76', 82'; Whiteman 45', (yellow card) 59'; Butters 66'; Lofranco 86'; Kloutsouniotis 90'	Stadium: Monarch Park Stadium

June 13, 2017	Master's Futbol	3–2	North Toronto Nitros	Vaughan, Ontario
9:00 pm	de Sousa 45', 59'; Page 66'	Report	Doyle 43', 50'	Stadium: Ontario Soccer Centre
Note: Matched originally scheduled to be played May 30, 2017.

=== Quarterfinals ===
June 14, 2017	North Mississauga SC	1–0	Toronto FC III	Mississauga, Ontario
8:00 pm	Marksman 24'	Report		Stadium: Hershey Centre 2

June 21, 2017	Woodbridge Strikers	3–0	FC London	Vaughan, Ontario
9:00 pm	Cavallini 51'; Isaac 77'; Carreiro 81'	Report		Stadium: Vaughan Grove Turf

June 21, 2017	Ottawa South United	1–3	Durham United FA	Ottawa, Ontario
7:00 pm	Cornwall 10'	Report	Rayne 50'; Moncrieffe 53'; Ewart 68'	Stadium: George Nelms Park

June 21, 2017	Vaughan Azzurri	6–1	Master's Futbol	Vaughan, Ontario
9:00 pm	Skublak 5', 34', 45', 63'; Di Chiara 28'; Jason Mills 57'	Report	Brown 79'	Stadium: Ontario Soccer Centre

=== Semifinals ===
July 12, 2017	North Mississauga SC	1–2	Woodbridge Strikers	Mississauga, Ontario
8:30 pm	Fenton 30'	Report	Isaac 14'; Cavallini 86'	Stadium: Herrshey Centre

July 12, 2017	Durham United FA	1–1 (2–4 p)	Vaughan Azzurri	Pickering, Ontario
8:00 pm	Lamanna 45'	Report	B. Mills 54'	Stadium: Kinsmen Park

=== Final ===
August 6, 2017	Woodbridge Strikers	3–1	Vaughan Azzurri	Vaughan, Ontario
8:15 pm	Issac 27', 74'; Baker 59'	Report	John 2'	Stadium: Ontario Soccer Centre

== Statistics ==
=== Top scorers ===
Rank	Player	Club	Goals
1	(Canada) Jarek Whiteman	Vaughan Azzurri	29
2	(Canada) Jose De Sousa	Master's Futbol	17
2	(Canada) Elvir Gigolaj	FC London	17
2	(Canada) Cyrus Rollocks	Toronto FC III	17
2	(Canada) Kadell Thomas	Sigma FC	17
6	(Canada) Mathew Santos	Oakville Blue Devils	14
7	(Canada) Daniel Da Silva	Toronto FC III	12
8	(Canada) Anthony Novak	Oakville Blue Devils	10
8	(Canada) Filipe Vilela	Oakville Blue Devils	10
10	(Five players tied)		9

Updated to matches played on October 8, 2017. Source:

=== Top goalkeepers ===
Rank	Player	Club	Minutes	GAA
1	(Canada) Quillan Roberts	Woodbridge Strikers	1710	0.79
2	(Canada) Matt George	Oakville Blue Devils	1755	0.92
3	(Canada) Triston Henry	Sigma FC	1789	0.96
4	(Canada) Gianluca Catalano	Toronto FC III	1486	1.33
5	(Canada) Benjamin Cowman	Durham United FA	1396	1.35
6	(Canada) Connor Dalton	FC London	540	1.50
7	(Canada) Mark Rogal	North Toronto Nitros	1350	1.53
8	(Canada) Colm Vance	Vaughan Azzurri	630	1.57
9	(Canada) Kyle Vizirakis	Windsor TFC Stars	1316	1.64
10	(Canada) Adam Majer	North Mississauga SC	597	1.81

Updated to matches played on October 8, 2017. Minimum 540 minutes played. Source:

== Awards ==
The following players received honours in the 2017 season:

Award	Player (Club)
Most Valuable Player	Dylan Carreiro (Woodbridge Strikers)
Golden Boot	Jarek Whiteman (Vaughan Azzurri)
Coach of the Year	Duncan Wilde (Oakville Blue Devils)
Young Player of the Year	Cyrus Rollocks (Toronto FC III)
Defender of the Year	Jonathan Grant (Sigma FC)
Goalkeeper of the Year	Quillan Roberts (Woodbridge Strikers)
Fair Play Award	Stefan Nikolic (Sanjaxx Lions)
Goal of the Year	Mujtaba Ameen (North Mississauga)

First Team All-Stars

Goalkeeper	Defenders	Midfielders	Forwards
Quillan Roberts (Woodbridge Strikers)	Michael Krzeminski (Woodbridge Strikers); Kyle Watson (Woodbridge Strikers); Joe Zupo (Durham United); Jonathan Grant (Sigma FC)	Khody Ellis (Oakville Blue Devils); Dylan Carreiro (Woodbridge Strikers); Giuliano Frano (Sigma FC); Joseph Di Chiara (Vaughan Azzurri)	Kadell Thomas (Sigma FC); Jarek Whiteman (Vaughan Azzurri)

Second Team All-Stars

Goalkeeper	Defenders	Midfielders	Forwards
Triston Henry (Sigma FC)	Jarred Phillips (Vaughan Azzurri); Konnor McNamara (Oakville Blue Devils); Aaron Schneebeli (FC London); Rocco Romeo (Toronto FC III)	Brandon Mills (Vaughan Azzurri); Taylor McNamara (Oakville Blue Devils); Chris Mannella (Vaughan Azzurri); Stephen Ademolu (Windsor TFC/Oakville)	Cyrus Rollocks (Toronto FC III); Jose De Sousa (Master's FA)

Third Team All-Stars

Goalkeeper	Defenders	Midfielders	Forwards
Matt George (Oakville Blue Devils)	Victor Gallo (Oakville Blue Devils); Jelani Smith (Sigma FC); Nathaniel Rodney Scarlett (Sanjaxx Lions); Anthony Wright (North Mississauga); Justin Earle (Ottawa South United); Thanujan Jeyathilaka (Toronto Skillz)	Kembo Kibato (North Toronto Nitros); Luca Petrasso (Toronto FC III); George Owusu (ProStars FC); Eddie Lay (Durham United); Joshua Paredes-Proctor (Woodbridge Strikers); Fred Ameyaw (Aurora FC)	Joey Melo (Master's FA); Elvir Gigolaj (FC London); Matthew Santos (Oakville Blue Devils); Filipe Vilela (Oakville Blue Devils); Niklas Bauer (North Toronto Nitros)

== All-Star Game ==
On June 28, the league announced that this year's all-star game would take place against an all-star team from the Première Ligue de soccer du Québec. The roster for this game was selected by team & league officials, and was announced on July 18.

July 19, 2017	L1O All-Stars	1–0	PLSQ All-Stars	Vaughan, Ontario
7:30 pm	Frano 43'	Report		Stadium: Ontario Soccer Centre; Attendance: 900

League1 Ontario
Pos.	Name	Team
GK	Quillan Roberts	Woodbridge Strikers
GK	Triston Henry	Sigma FC
GK	Gianluca Catalano	Toronto FC III
D	Jonathan Grant	Sigma FC
D	Victor Gallo	Oakville Blue Devils
D	Bruce Cullen	Durham United FA
D	Jarred Phillips	Vaughan Azzurri
D	Aaron Schneebli	FC London
D	Jamar Kelly	Windsor TFC Stars
D	Nathaniel Rodney-Scarlett	Sanjaxx Lions
M	Chris Mannella	Vaughan Azzurri
M	Giuliano Frano	Sigma FC
M	Dylan Carreiro	Woodbridge Strikers
M	Joseph Di Chiara	Vaughan Azzurri
M	Carl De Abreu	North Toronto Nitros
M	Anthony Novak	Oakville Blue Devils
F	Christian Cavallini	Woodbridge Strikers
F	Filipe Vilela	Oakville Blue Devils
F	Jarek Whiteman	Vaughan Azzurri
F	Lee Victor Massunda	North Mississauga SC
F	Jose De Sousa	Master's Futbol
F	Kadell Thomas	Sigma FC
F	Kembo Kibato	North Toronto Nitros

Première Ligue de soccer du Québec
Pos.	Name	Team
GK	Gabard Fénélon	Lanaudière
GK	Horace Patient Sobze Zemo	Gatineau
D	Riccardo Téoli	Mont-Royal Outremont
D	Kevin Cossette	Dynamo de Québec
D	Renan Dias	Mont-Royal Outremont
D	Bila Dicko-Raynauld	Gatineau
D	Diego Politis	Gatineau
M	Yannick Toker	Mont-Royal Outremont
M	Vincent Cyr	Gatineau
M	Sean Rosa	Mont-Royal Outremont
M	Michael McIntyre	Lanaudière
M	Kevin Amourette	Longueuil
M	Dalin Saheb	St-Hubert
F	Frederico Moojen	Mont-Royal Outremont
F	Dex Kaniki	Longueuil
F	Mitchell Syla	Lanaudière
F	Berlin Jean-Gilles	Lanaudière
