= Taylor McNamara =

Taylor McNamara may refer:

- Taylor McNamara (American football), American football player
- Taylor McNamara (soccer), Canadian soccer player
