= Jelani =

Jelani is a given name. Notable people with the name include:

- Jelani Cobb (born 1969), American writer, author and educator
- Jelani Gardner (born 1975), American-French basketball player
- Jelani Jenkins (born 1992), American football player
- Jelani McCoy (born 1977), American basketball player
- Jelani Smith (born 1991), Canadian-born Guyanese footballer
- Jelani Peters (born 1993), Trinidadian footballer
- Jelani Woods (born 1998), American football player
