= Oluwaseun Oyegunle =

Canadian soccer player (born 2002)

Personal information
- Full name: Oluwaseun Oyegunle
- Date of birth: November 3, 2002 (age 24)
- Place of birth: Toronto, Ontario, Canada
- Height: 1.88 m (6 ft 2 in)
- Position: Defender

Team information
- Current team: Chicago Fire II
- Number: 43

Youth career
- Brampton East SC
- Sigma FC

College career
Years	Team	Apps	(Gls)
2021–2023	Syracuse Orange	62	(0)

Senior career*
Years	Team	Apps	(Gls)
2018–2019	Sigma FC	17	(0)
2019	Forge FC	1	(0)
2022–2023	Sigma FC	19	(0)
2025–	Chicago Fire II	3	(0)
- * Club domestic league appearances and goals as of April 21, 2025

Oluwaseun Oyegunle (born 3 November 2002) is a Canadian professional soccer player who plays as a defender for Chicago Fire FC II in MLS Next Pro.

== Early life ==
Oyegunle began playing organized soccer at age seven with Brampton East SC. When he was 15, he joined Sigma FC.

== College career ==
In January 2021, he began attending Syracuse University, where he played for the men's soccer team. He had initially been set to join in September 2020, however, he delayed it due to the COVID-19 pandemic. He made his debut during the 2021 Spring season against the Hofstra Pride. In his first season during the 2021 Spring, he made seven appearances. Over his four seasons with Syracuse, he appeared in 62 matches and helped them win the 2022 NCAA national title.

== Club career ==
In 2018, Oyegunle made his senior debut in League1 Ontario with Sigma FC, and would make a total of five appearances that season. In 2019, he made twelve league appearances for Sigma and made one additional appearance in the League1 Ontario playoffs.

In September 2019, Oyegunle signed his first professional contract with Canadian Premier League side Forge FC. On October 12, 2019, he made his debut as a substitute in a 4–0 loss to York9 FC, at age sixteen.

In 2022, he returned to League1 Ontario with Sigma FC. He was named a league Second Team All-Star and U20 All-Star in 2022.

At the 2024 MLS SuperDraft, he was selected in the second round (33rd overall) by the Chicago Fire. In January 2025, Oyegunle signed with Chicago's MLS Next Pro side Chicago Fire II on a one-year contract with a club option for 2026.

== International career ==
In August 2019, Oyegunle received his first international call-up for a Canada U17 preparation camp ahead of the 2019 FIFA U-17 World Cup.

== Career statistics ==
As of match played July 23, 2023

Club	Season	League			Playoffs		National Cup		Other		Total	
Club	Season	Division	Apps	Goals	Apps	Goals	Apps	Goals	Apps	Goals	Apps	Goals
Sigma FC	2018	League1 Ontario	5	0	0	0	—		?	0	5	0
Sigma FC	2019	League1 Ontario	12	0	1	0	—		—		13	0
Sigma FC	Total		17	0	1	0	0	0	0	0	18	0
Forge FC	2019	Canadian Premier League	1	0	0	0	0	0	0	0	1	0
Sigma FC	2022	League1 Ontario	14	0	—		—		—		14	0
Sigma FC	2023	League1 Ontario	5	0	—		—		—		5	0
Sigma FC	Total		19	0	0	0	0	0	0	0	19	0
Career total			37	0	1	0	0	0	0	0	38	0
