= Jace Kotsopoulos =

Canadian soccer player (born 1997)

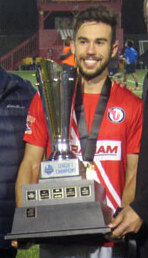
- Kotsopoulos in 2021

Personal information
- Full name: Jace Dayton Kotsopoulos
- Date of birth: December 1, 1997 (age 28)
- Place of birth: Burlington, Ontario, Canada
- Height: 1.75 m (5 ft 9 in)
- Position: Forward

Team information
- Current team: Burlington SC

Youth career
- Oakville SC
- Dixie SC
- Burlington SC

College career
Years	Team	Apps	(Gls)
2015–2019	Guelph Gryphons	61	(58)

Senior career*
Years	Team	Apps	(Gls)
2018	Vaughan Azzurri	1	(3)
2019	Forge FC	3	(2)
2020	York9 FC	1	(0)
2021–2022	Guelph United	24	(20)
2022	FC Berlin	1	(0)
2023	Burlington SC	18	(6)
- * Club domestic league appearances and goals as of August 23, 2023

Jace Dayton Kotsopoulos (born December 1, 1997) is a Canadian soccer player.

== Early life ==
Kotsopoulos first played youth soccer with Oakville SC and Dixie SC. He joined Burlington SC at U13 level, playing until 2015 at the U19 level. When he was 16, he trained with the Spanish club Real Sociedad youth academy.

== University career ==
Kotsopoulous attended the University of Guelph playing for the men's soccer team for five years, where he set the school's all-time goal scoring record with 58 goals, beating the previous mark by nine goals. In his first season, he led the team with 11 goals, being named an OUA Second Team All-Star. In his second year, he led the OUA with 17 goals, being named to the OUA West Second Team All Star for the second year in a row, as Guelph won the OUA title and a national bronze medal. During his third year, he missed part of the season due to a meniscus tear and missed most of his fifth and final season due to a sprained ankle. In his third season, despite an injury, he was named an OUA West First Team All-Star and a U Sports Second Team All Canadian after scoring ten goals in nine games. In his fourth year, he led the Ontario University Athletics with 15 goals in 17 games, being named the U Sports men’s soccer player of the year as well as the OUA male athlete of the year, named OUA West MVP and an OUA First Team All-Star, and he was also named the U Sports soccer player of the year, and was nominated for the U Sports Male Athlete of the Year. In his final season in 2019, he struggled with injuries, but returned in the quarter-finals to score two goals to help Guelph to the OUA Final Four.

== Club career ==
In 2018, Kotsopoulos played one league match for League1 Ontario side Vaughan Azzurri and scored a hat-trick. He also played in three league cup matches, scoring three goals, including both of his team's goals in a 2-1 victory over Toronto FC III in the final.

On November 12, 2018, Kotsopoulos was drafted 3rd overall by Forge FC in the 2018 CPL–U Sports Draft. On May 16, 2019, he signed a developmental contract with Forge. On June 12, 2019, Kotsopoulos made his debut as a substitute in the Canadian Championship against Cavalry FC. He made his league debut as a substitute the following weekend, scoring the tying goal in a 2–1 come-from-behind win against Valour FC, which qualified Forge for the 2019 CONCACAF League, and made him one of the youngest goalscorers in league history. In August 2019, Kotsopoulos opted to return to the University of Guelph to finish his final semester. He finished the season with two goals in five substitute appearances, including an appearance in the CONCACAF League.

On August 9, 2020, York9 announced the signing of Kotsopolous. He made his debut on August 22 against Valour FC, which was his only appearance in the short 2020 season.

On March 13, 2021, Kotsopoulos became the first ever player to sign with League1 Ontario expansion side Guelph United. In his debut on July 30, he scored a hat trick against FC London. He led the league in scoring in 2021 with 15 goals in the regular season, and helped the team win the league championship, scoring twice in Guelph's 3-1 victory over Blue Devils FC in the championship final. For the 2021 season, he was named West Division MVP, a West Division All-Star, and won the league Golden Boot.

In October 2022, he signed with FC Berlin in the United Premier Soccer League.

In January 2023, he joined Burlington SC, his former youth club, in League1 Ontario.

== Career statistics ==
As of August 23, 2023

Club	Season	League			Playoffs		Domestic Cup		League Cup		Continental		Total	
Club	Season	Division	Apps	Goals	Apps	Goals	Apps	Goals	Apps	Goals	Apps	Goals	Apps	Goals
Vaughan Azzurri	2018	League1 Ontario	1	3	0	0	–		3	3	–		4	6
Forge FC	2019	Canadian Premier League	3	2	0	0	1	0	–		1	0	5	2
York9 FC	2020	Canadian Premier League	1	0	–		–		–		–		1	0
Guelph United FC	2021	League1 Ontario	12	15	2	3	–		–		–		14	18
Guelph United FC	2022	League1 Ontario	12	5	–		1	0	–		–		13	5
FC Berlin	2022	United Premier Soccer League	1	0	–		–		–		–		1	0
Burlington SC	2023	League1 Ontario	18	6	1	0	–		–		–		19	6
Career total			48	31	3	3	2	0	3	3	1	0	57	37
