= Tristan Borges =

Canadian soccer player (born 1998)

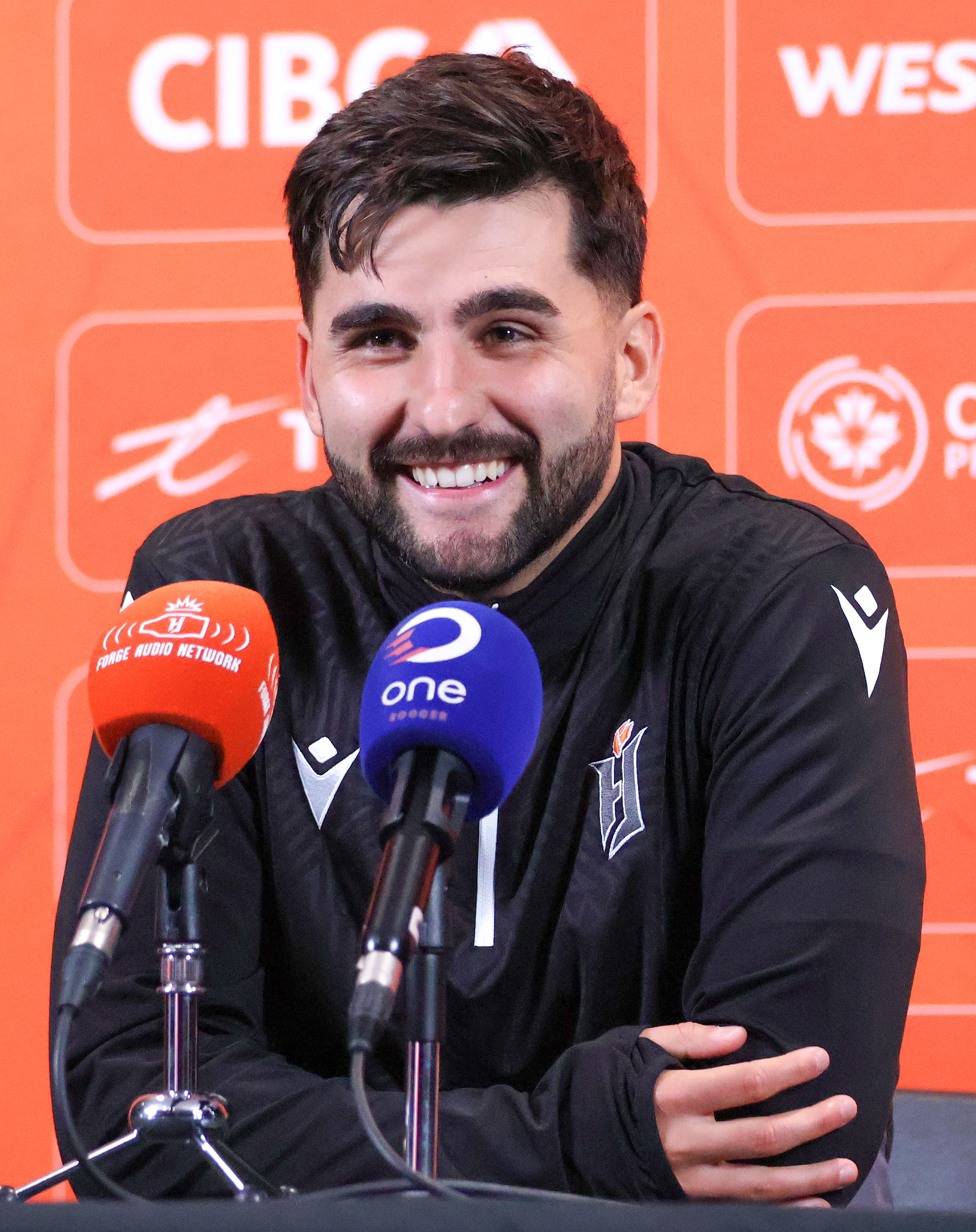
- Borges with Forge FC in 2024

Personal information
- Full name: Tristan Daniel Borges
- Date of birth: August 26, 1998 (age 28)
- Place of birth: Toronto, Ontario, Canada
- Height: 1.70 m (5 ft 7 in)
- Position: Midfielder

Team information
- Current team: Forge FC
- Number: 19

Youth career
- 2004–?: Vaughan SC
- –2010: Kleinburg-Nobleton SC
- 2011–2015: West Toronto United
- 2015: Toronto FC
- 2016–2018: Heerenveen

Senior career*
Years	Team	Apps	(Gls)
2015	Toronto FC III		(6)
2018	Sigma FC	7	(1)
2019	Forge FC	25	(12)
2020–2022	OH Leuven	4	(0)
2021–2022	→ Forge FC (loan)	32	(8)
2022–	Forge FC	85	(14)

International career^{‡}
2014–2015	Canada U17	6	(1)
2015–2017	Canada U20	3	(0)
2020	Canada	1	(0)
- * Club domestic league appearances and goals as of November 3, 2024 ‡ National team caps and goals as of January 10, 2020

Tristan Daniel Borges (born August 26, 1998) is a Canadian professional soccer player who plays as a midfielder for Canadian Premier League club Forge FC.

== Early life ==
Borges was born in Toronto, Ontario but grew up in Brantford, Ontario. Borges began playing youth soccer with Vaughan SC, later moving on to Kleinburg-Nobleton SC followed by West Toronto SC. In 2015, he joined the Toronto FC Academy. He is of Portuguese descent and holds a European passport.

== Playing career ==
=== Semi-professional and U21 ===
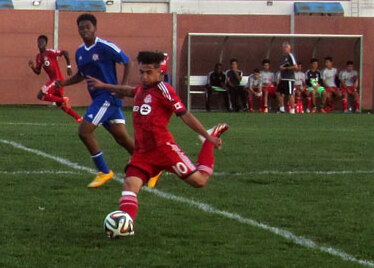
Tristan Borges playing for Toronto FC Academy in 2015

In 2015, he played in League1 Ontario with Toronto FC III. He scored his first goal on July 4 against ANB Futbol. Over the course of the season, he scored six goals.

From early 2016 until summer 2018, Borges was a member of the youth academy of Dutch Eredivisie club SC Heerenveen where he played for the U21 team.

After leaving Heerenveen in summer 2018, Borges returned to Canada and signed with League1 Ontario side Sigma FC in September of that year.

=== Professional ===
On January 10, 2019, Borges signed his first professional contract with Canadian Premier League side Forge FC. He made his debut in the inaugural CPL match against York9 FC on April 27, 2019. He scored the winning goal in the first leg of the CPL Finals, before being sent off. Forge appealed the red card to the Canadian Soccer Association and it was rescinded, allowing Borges to play in the second leg, which also ended in a 1–0 victory. Borges was a standout in the CPL's inaugural season, winning the Golden Boot, with 13 goals, and sharing in a six-way tie for most assists, with five. In November 2019, Borges was announced as both the CPL Player of the Year and best Canadian U-21 player.

On January 22, 2020, Borges was transferred to Belgian First Division B side Oud-Heverlee Leuven for a fee reported to be "between $300,000 and $500,000", signing a contract until summer 2022. He made his debut on February 1 against Roeselare.

On March 5, 2021, after receiving limited playing time for OH Leuven, Borges was loaned back to Forge FC for the 2021 Canadian Premier League season. His loan was later extended in February 2022. Upon the expiry of his contract with Leuven and thus his Forge loan, he remained with Forge for the remainder of the season. In October 2023, Borges helped Forge win their fourth league title, scoring an Olympico goal to seal a 2–1 win over Cavalry FC in the play-off final. At the end of the 2024 season, he was named the 2024 CPL Player of the Year, becoming the first player to win the award twice.

== International career ==
=== Youth ===
Borges received his first Canadian youth national team call-up in August 2014 for an under-17 friendly tournament in Mexico. He participated in several other under-17 camps in the fall and winter of 2014–15 and was subsequently called up for the 2015 CONCACAF U-17 Championship. Borges made six appearances in the tournament and scored Canada's lone goal in a 1–1 draw against Mexico.

Beginning in September 2015, Borges participated in several under-20 team camps in the lead-up to the 2017 CONCACAF U-20 Championship. At that tournament, he made three appearances for Canada and assisted on a goal in a 2–0 win over Antigua and Barbuda.

In January 2018, Borges was called up for a Canadian under-23 camp in the United States. In February 2020, Borges was named to the Canadian U-23 provisional roster for the 2020 CONCACAF Men's Olympic Qualifying Championship.

=== Senior ===
In January 2020, Borges was called up to the Canadian senior team ahead of friendlies against Barbados and Iceland. He made his debut as a substitute on January 10 against Barbados.

== Career statistics ==
As of November 3, 2025

Club statistics
Club	Season	League			Playoffs		National Cup (Note: Includes appearances in the Canadian Championship)		Continental (Note: Includes appearances in CONCACAF League and CONCACAF Champions League)		Total	
Club	Season	Division	Apps	Goals	Apps	Goals	Apps	Goals	Apps	Goals	Apps	Goals
Sigma FC	2018	League1 Ontario	7	1	3	1	—		—		10	2
Forge FC	2019	Canadian Premier League	25	12	2	1	2	0	4	0	33	13
OH Leuven	2019–20	Belgian First Division B	4	0	—		0	0	—		4	0
OH Leuven	2020–21	Belgian First Division A	0	0	—		0	0	—		0	0
Forge FC (on loan)	2021	Canadian Premier League	24	3	2	0	2	0	6	1	34	4
Forge FC (on loan)	2022	Canadian Premier League	8	5	—		3 (Note: Includes appearance in the 2020 Canadian Championship final (played in 2022).)	0	2	0	13	5
Forge FC	2022	Canadian Premier League	15	1	2	0	—		—		17	1
Forge FC	2023	Canadian Premier League	26	1	1	1	3	0	—		30	2
Forge FC	2024	Canadian Premier League	23	8	2	0	5	0	2	0	32	8
Forge FC	2025	Canadian Premier League	21	4	2	0	4	1	2	0	29	5
Forge FC	Total		217	22	9	1	17	1	12	1	155	25
Career total			153	35	14	3	19	1	16	1	202	40

Canada National Team
Year	Apps	Goals
2020	1	0

== Honours ==
Forge FC

- Canadian Premier League: 2019, 2022, 2023
- CPL Shield: 2021, 2024, 2025
- Canadian Championship: 2026

Individual

- Canadian Premier League Golden Boot: 2019
- Canadian Premier League Player of the Year: 2019, 2024
- Canadian Premier League Best U21 Canadian Player of the Year: 2019
