= Canadian Premier League Player of the Year =

Soccer award for Canadian Premier League players

Player of the Year
- Sport: Soccer
- League: Canadian Premier League
- Country: Canada

History
- First award: 2019
- First winner: (Canada) Tristan Borges
- Most wins: Tristan Borges (2)
- Most recent: Tobias Warschewski
- Website: canpl.ca/awards/

The Canadian Premier League Player of the Year award has been awarded since the inaugural 2019 season. The award is given to the most valuable player of the Canadian Premier League as voted by members of the media. It is awarded annually at the Canadian Premier League Awards ceremony.

Initially the award was based on the entire Canadian Premier League season, including playoffs and finals. In 2022, a change was made to all CPL awards so that they are only judged based on results from the regular season. Tristan Borges of Forge FC was the first to win the award and is the only player to win the award twice. Kyle Bekker has received the most nominations with five as of the 2024 season.

== Winners by year ==
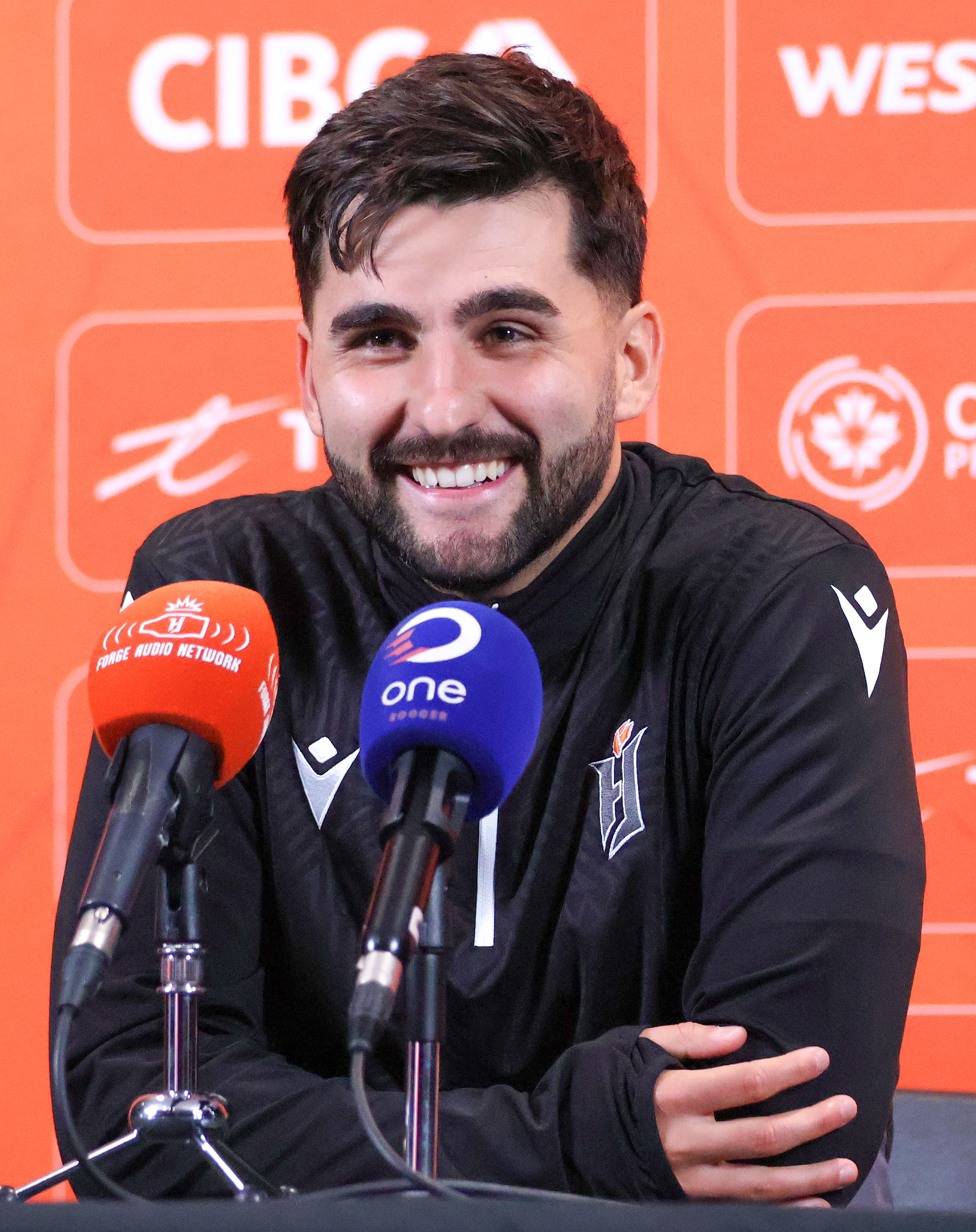
Tristan Borges was the first winner of the award

Player of the Year
Season	Player	Pos.	Club	Statistics (Note: Statistics include playoffs for 2019–2021 awards)			Ref
Season	Player	Pos.	Club	G	A	Team finish	Ref
2019	(Canada) Tristan Borges	MF	Forge FC	13	5	2nd, champions	
2020	(Canada) Kyle Bekker	MF	Forge FC	3	1	Champions	
2021	(Brazil) João Morelli	FW	HFX Wanderers FC	14	0	6th	
2022	(Northern Ireland) Ollie Bassett	MF	Atlético Ottawa	8	2	1st	
2023	(Netherlands) Daan Klomp	DF	Cavalry FC	4	1	1st	
2024	(Canada) Tristan Borges	MF	Forge FC	8	6	1st	
2025	(Canada) Samuel Salter	FW	Atlético Ottawa	19	4	2nd	
2026	(Germany) Tobias Warschewski	FW	Cavalry FC	11	10	1st	
