= Kadell Thomas =

Canadian soccer player (born 1996)

Personal information
- Date of birth: November 26, 1996 (age 29)
- Place of birth: North York, Ontario, Canada
- Height: 1.83 m (6 ft 0 in)
- Position: Forward

Team information
- Current team: Sigma FC

Youth career
- Brampton Youth SC
- Brampton East SC
- 2012–2014: Sigma FC

College career
Years	Team	Apps	(Gls)
2014	Cloud County Thunderbirds	19	(2)
2016	Broward Seahawks	6	(8)
2022	Humber Hawks	10	(9)

Senior career*
Years	Team	Apps	(Gls)
2014–2018	Sigma FC	44+	(21+)
2019–2020	Forge FC	22	(3)
2021–2022	Sigma FC	5	(0)
2023	North Mississauga SC	3	(0)
2023–	Sigma FC	42	(6)
2025	→ Sigma FC B	1	(0)
- * Club domestic league appearances and goals as of August 28, 2025

Kadell Thomas (born November 26, 1996) is a Canadian professional soccer player who plays for Sigma FC in League1 Ontario.

== Early life ==
A native of Brampton, Ontario, Thomas began playing soccer with Brampton Youth SC before later joining Brampton East SC. At age 15, he joined the Sigma FC youth program.

== College career ==
In 2014, Thomas attended Cloud County Community College, playing for the men's soccer team, where he recorded two goals and five assists in 19 appearances.

In 2016, he attended Broward College, recording eight goals and four assists in six appearances, earning second team all-star honours.

In 2017, he was set to transfer to California State University, Fullerton to play for the Cal State Fullerton Titans, but did not eventually join.

In 2022, he began attending Humber College, where he will play for the men's soccer team. On September 17, 2022, he scored his first goal for Humber against St. Clair College. On October 5, he scored a hat-trick against the Conestoga Condors. He finished second on the team with nine goals in 2022, being named an OCAA First Team All-Star.

== Club career ==
He made his senior debut with Sigma FC in League1 Ontario in 2014. In 2017, Thomas scored a career-high seventeen goals in eighteen appearances, tied for second among league top scorers, and was subsequently named to the league First All-Star Team. In 2018, Thomas made fourteen league appearances, scoring four goals and added another four goals in three playoff appearances. He was subsequently named to the league First All-Star Team for the second year in a row.

On March 2, 2019, Thomas signed his first professional contract with Canadian Premier League side Forge FC, joining former coach Bobby Smyrniotis. On April 27, 2019, Thomas made his professional debut as a substitute in the CPL inaugural match and scored the first goal in Forge FC history in the 78th minute. Later in 2019, he suffered a head injury during a collision, requiring oral surgery, which caused him to miss much of the remainder of the season, returning in the league final.

In 2021, he returned to Sigma FC.

In 2023, he began playing with North Mississauga SC, before returning to Sigma FC during the season.

== Career statistics ==
As of August 28, 2025

Appearances and goals by club, season and competition
Club	Season	League			Playoffs		National Cup		League Cup		Continental		Total	
Club	Season	Division	Apps	Goals	Apps	Goals	Apps	Goals	Apps	Goals	Apps	Goals	Apps	Goals
Sigma FC	2016	League1 Ontario	12	0	—		—		0	0	—		12	0
Sigma FC	2017	League1 Ontario	18	17	—		—		1	0	—		19	17
Sigma FC	2018	League1 Ontario	14	4	3	4	—		3	4	—		20	12
Sigma FC	Total		44	21	3	4	0	0	4	4	0	0	51	29
Forge FC	2019	Canadian Premier League	14	3	1	0	1	0	—		3	0	18	3
Forge FC	2020	Canadian Premier League	8	0	1	0	0	0	—		4	0	13	0
Forge FC	Total		22	3	2	0	1	0	0	0	7	0	32	3
Sigma FC	2021	League1 Ontario	4	0	—		—		—		—		4	0
Sigma FC	2022	League1 Ontario	1	0	—		—		—		—		1	0
Sigma FC	Total		5	0	0	0	0	0	0	0	0	0	5	0
North Mississauga SC	2023	League1 Ontario	3	0	—		—		—		—		3	0
Sigma FC	2023	League1 Ontario	9	3	—		—		—		—		9	3
Sigma FC	2024	League1 Ontario Premier	20	2	—		—		2	1	—		22	3
Sigma FC	2025	League1 Ontario Premier	13	1	—		—		0	0	—		13	1
Sigma FC	Total		42	6	0	0	0	0	2	1	0	0	44	7
Sigma FC B	2025	League2 Ontario	1	0	—		—		—		—		1	0
Career total			117	30	5	4	1	0	6	5	7	0	136	39

== Honours ==
=== Club ===
Forge FC

- Canadian Premier League: 2019, 2020

Individual

- League1 Ontario First Team All-Star: 2017, 2018
