= Cloud County Thunderbirds =

- University: Cloud County Community College
- Nickname: Thunderbirds
- Association: NJCAA
- Conference: Kansas Jayhawk Community College Conference
- Athletic director: Matt Bechard
- Location: Concordia, Kansas
- Varsity teams: 11
- Colors: Black and gold
- Website: www.cloud.edu/athletics/

The Cloud County Thunderbirds are the sports teams of Cloud County Community College located in Concordia, Kansas, United States. They participate in the National Junior College Athletic Association (NJCAA) and in the Kansas Jayhawk Community College Conference. The Thunderbirds have won NJCAA national championships in women's basketball (2001) and men's soccer (2011). The school's track teams have finished in the top five nationally on several occasions.

== Sports ==
Men's sports

- Baseball
- Basketball
- Cross country
- Soccer
- Track & field

Women's sports

- Basketball
- Cross country
- Soccer
- Softball
- Track and field
- Volleyball

== Notable alumni ==
- Joel Fahie, former British Virgin Islands national team player
- Mike Kirkland, athletic director of the Southwestern College Moundbuilders
- Deon Lyle, professional basketball player in Armenia
- (Australia) Jason Rees, professional baseball player in the Israel Baseball League
- Shanele Stires, former WNBA basketball player Minnesota Lynx and college basketball coach
- Kadell Thomas, soccer player for Forge FC in the Canadian Premier League
