= Anthony Novak =

Canadian soccer player (born 1994)

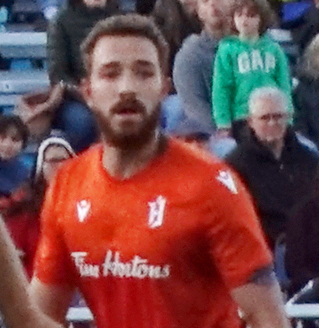
- Novak in 2019 with Forge FC

Personal information
- Full name: Anthony Joseph Novak
- Date of birth: March 27, 1994 (age 32)
- Place of birth: Pickering, Ontario, Canada
- Height: 5 ft 11 in (1.80 m)
- Position: Forward

Youth career
- Pickering SC
- Wexford SC
- 2008: Glen Shields Sun Devils
- 2009–2012: Toronto Lynx

College career
Years	Team	Apps	(Gls)
2012–2015	Lake Erie Storm	65	(14)

Senior career*
Years	Team	Apps	(Gls)
2012–2014	Toronto Lynx	21	(1)
2015–2018	Oakville Blue Devils FC	39	(28)
2019–2020	Forge FC	24	(8)
2021	Condeixa	6	(0)
2021–2022	Cavalry FC	24	(4)
2023	Valour FC	23	(1)
- * Club domestic league appearances and goals as of October 6, 2023

Anthony Joseph Novak (born March 27, 1994) is a Canadian professional soccer player who plays as a centre-forward.

== Early life ==
Novak was born in Pickering, Ontario and began playing youth soccer with Pickering SC. He played as a goalkeeper in his youth with Wexford SC, Glen Shields SC, as well as the Durham regional program. He later joined the youth system of the Toronto Lynx.

== College career ==
In 2012, he committed to attend Lake Erie College, where he would play four seasons of NCAA Division II soccer. He scored his first collegiate goal on September 2, 2012 against In 2013, he was earned All-Ohio Division II honours. In 2014, he was named to the All-GLIAC First Team, All-Ohio First-Team, and All-Midwest Region Third Team honours. On October 25, 2015, he scored a hat-tick against the Walsh Cavaliers. In 2015, he earned All-Midwest Second-Team, All-GLIAC Second-Team, and All-Ohio Second-Team honours. During his time with Lake Erie, he made two appearances as a goalkeeper, starting a match against the Tiffin Dragons on October 23, 2013 and taking over late in a match against the Seton Hill Griffins, following a red card to the starting goalkeeper on September 5, 2015.

== Club career ==
From 2012 to 2014, he played with the Toronto Lynx in the Premier Development League.

In 2015, he began playing with Oakville Blue Devils FC in League1 Ontario, who re-branded from the Lynx, upon the Lynx's folding. On April 29, 2018, he scored a hat trick in the season opener in a 5-0 victory over Toronto Skillz FC. In 2015, he was named a league Mid-Season All-Star. In 2017 and 2018, he played in the league all star games against the PLSQ. On August 12, 2018, he scored another hat-trick in a 5-0 victory over Ottawa South United. In 2018, he won the league's Golden Boot as the top goal-scorer with 18 goals during the season and was also named a league First Team All-Star. With the Blue Devils, he won the L1O championship in both 2015 and 2017.

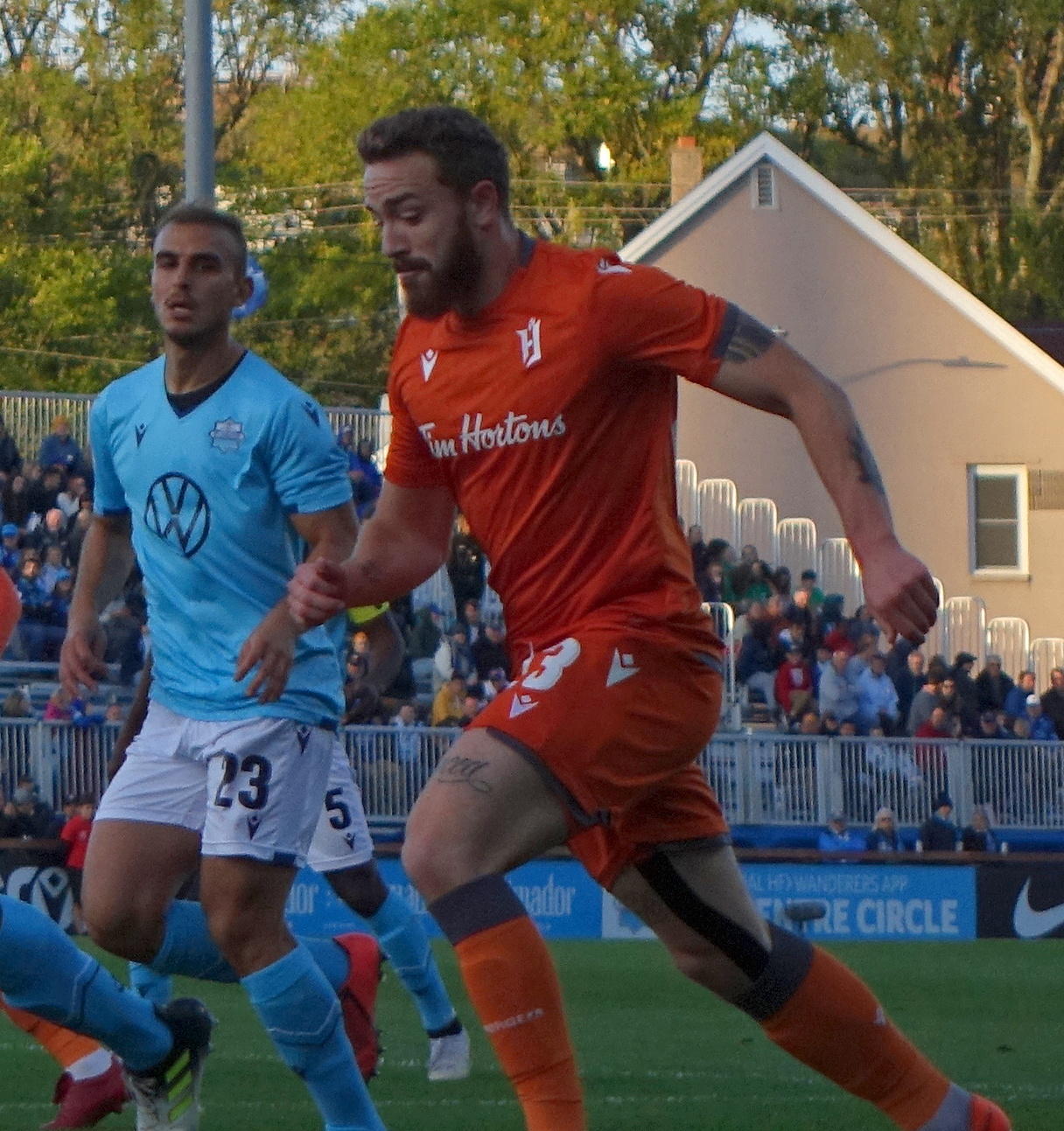
Anthony Novak of Forge FC against HFX Wanderers FC

In April 2019, he joined Forge FC in the Canadian Premier League, after participating in a two-week trial with the club during their pre-season. On May 8, he made his debut for the club against Pacific FC, also scoring his first goal for the club, scoring just three minutes into the match. On August 13, 2020, he scored an overhead kick goal against Cavalry FC. On October 22, 2020, he scored the winning goal in a 2-1 victory over Municipal Limeño of El Salvador in a CONCACAF League match and added an assist in a victory against Panamanian club Tauro FC. With Forge, he won the league championship in both 2019 and 2020. Over his two seasons with Forge, he scored nine goals and added five assists in 32 matches across all competitions.

In February 2021, he signed his first contract abroad, joining Campeonato de Portugal side Clube Condeixa. He joined on a contract until the end of the 2020/2021 season. He recorded his first assist in a 1-0 win over Vitória de Sernache.

In April 2021, he returned to the Canadian Premier League, signing a multi-year contract with Cavalry FC. He made the 3400 km trip to Calgary from Ontario entirely by car, upon his signing. He scored two goals against his former club Forge that season. In March 2022, he tore his lateral collateral ligament, which required surgery, causing him to miss the entire 2022 season.

In March 2023, he signed with Valour FC in the Canadian Premier League. He scored his first goal for the club in the season opener on April 16, against York United FC.

== Career statistics ==
As of July 9, 2023

Club	League	Season	League		Playoffs		National Cup		Continental		Total	
Club	League	Season	Apps	Goals	Apps	Goals	Apps	Goals	Apps	Goals	Apps	Goals
Toronto Lynx	Premier Development League	2012	1	0	—		—		—		1	0
Toronto Lynx	Premier Development League	2013	8	0	—		—		—		8	0
Toronto Lynx	Premier Development League	2014	12	1	—		—		—		12	1
Toronto Lynx	Total		21	1	0	0	0	0	0	0	21	1
Oakville Blue Devils FC	League1 Ontario	2015	?	?	—		—		—		?	?
Oakville Blue Devils FC	League1 Ontario	2016	2	0	—		—		—		2	0
Oakville Blue Devils FC	League1 Ontario	2017	21	10	—		—		—		21	10
Oakville Blue Devils FC	League1 Ontario	2018	16	18	2	2	2	1	—		20	21
Oakville Blue Devils FC	Total		39+	28+	2	2	2	1	0	0	43+	31+
Forge FC	Canadian Premier League	2019	16	6	2	0	0	0	4	0	22	6
Forge FC	Canadian Premier League	2020	8	2	1	0	—		4	1	13	3
Forge FC	Total		24	8	3	0	0	0	8	1	35	9
Condeixa	Campeonato de Portugal	2020–21	6	0	—		0	0	—		6	0
Cavalry FC	Canadian Premier League	2021	24	4	1	0	2	0	—		27	0
Cavalry FC	Canadian Premier League	2022	0	0	0	0	0	0	—		0	0
Cavalry FC	Total		24	4	1	0	2	0	0	0	27	0
Valour FC	Canadian Premier League	2023	23	1	–		1	1	—		24	2
Career total			137+	42+	6	2	5	2	8	1	156+	47+

== Honours ==
Forge FC

- Canadian Premier League: 2019, 2020
