= Quillan Roberts =

Canadian-Guyanese footballer (born 1994)

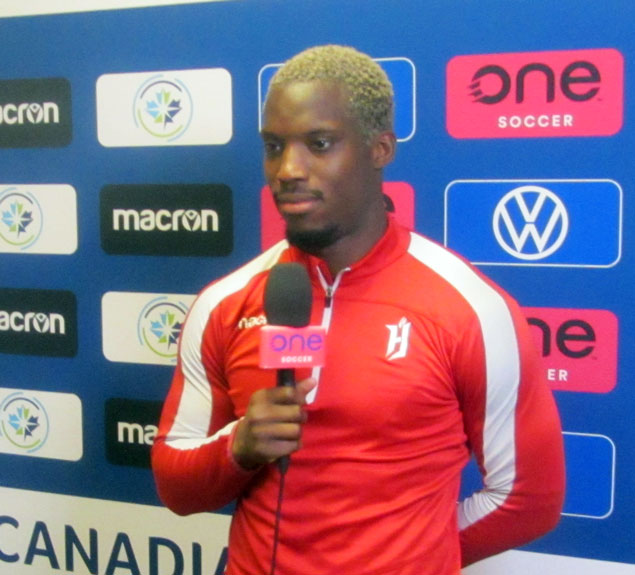
- Roberts in 2019

Personal information
- Full name: Quillan Eon Myles Roberts
- Date of birth: 13 September 1994 (age 32)
- Place of birth: Toronto, Ontario, Canada
- Height: 1.83 m (6 ft 0 in)
- Position: Goalkeeper

Team information
- Current team: Western Suburbs FC

Youth career
- Brampton YSC
- Brampton East SC
- 2009–2012: Toronto FC
- 2010: Portugal FC

College career
| Years | Team | Apps | (Gls) |
| 2017 | York Lions | 9 | (0) |

Senior career*
| Years | Team | Apps | (Gls) |
| 2012–2016 | Toronto FC | 0 | (0) |
| 2014 | → Wilmington Hammerheads (loan) | 17 | (0) |
| 2015–2016 | → Toronto FC II (loan) | 24 | (0) |
| 2017 | Woodbridge Strikers | 20 | (0) |
| 2018 | Los Angeles FC | 0 | (0) |
| 2019 | Forge FC | 8 | (0) |
| 2021 | 1812 FC Barrie | 12 | (0) |
| 2022 | Electric City FC | 17 | (0) |
| 2023– | Western Suburbs FC | 34 | (0) |

International career^{‡}
| 2011 | Canada U17 | 3 | (1) |
| 2015 | Canada | 1 | (0) |
| 2019– | Guyana | 21 | (0) |
- * Club domestic league appearances and goals as of 6 January 2025 ‡ National team caps and goals as of 15 October 2024

Quillan Eon Myles Roberts (born 13 September 1994) is a professional footballer who plays as a goalkeeper for New Zealand Central League club Western Suburbs. Born in Canada, he currently plays for the Guyana national team after having previously represented Canada at both youth and senior level.

After spells in the youth ranks of Toronto FC and Portugal FC, Roberts signed a first-team contract with Toronto FC in 2012. After loan spells with the Wilmington Hammerheads and Toronto FC II, he was released after the 2016 season.

A move to Woodbridge Strikers saw Roberts record a league and cup double, while also being named First Team All Star and Goalkeeper of the Year. That year, he also appeared for York University Lions and lifted the title in the Ontario University Athletics.

He has been capped once for the Canada national team, and scored from his own half in one of three appearances at youth level during the FIFA Under-17 World Cup in 2011.

== Club career ==
=== Early career ===
Roberts began playing soccer at age six with Brampton Youth SC.

=== Toronto FC ===
A product of the Toronto FC Academy, Roberts also had a brief spell in the youth ranks of Portugal FC in the Canadian Soccer League. On 10 April 2012, he became the seventh graduate to join Toronto FC after signing a first team contract.

On 21 July 2012, he made his first appearance as a second-half substitute for Freddy Hall in a 1–1 draw against a Liverpool side including Joe Cole, Martin Škrtel and Raheem Sterling.

After five years in the first team squad without making a senior appearance, Roberts was released in December 2016.

==== Wilmington Hammerheads (loan) ====
After failing to make a competitive appearance in two seasons with Toronto, Roberts was loaned to United Soccer League side the Wilmington Hammerheads alongside teammates Manny Aparicio and Daniel Lovitz. On 6 April 2014, he kept a clean sheet on his debut in a 0–0 draw with the Harrisburg City Islanders.

On 6 August, Roberts was recalled having made 17 appearances for the club.

==== Toronto FC II (loan) ====
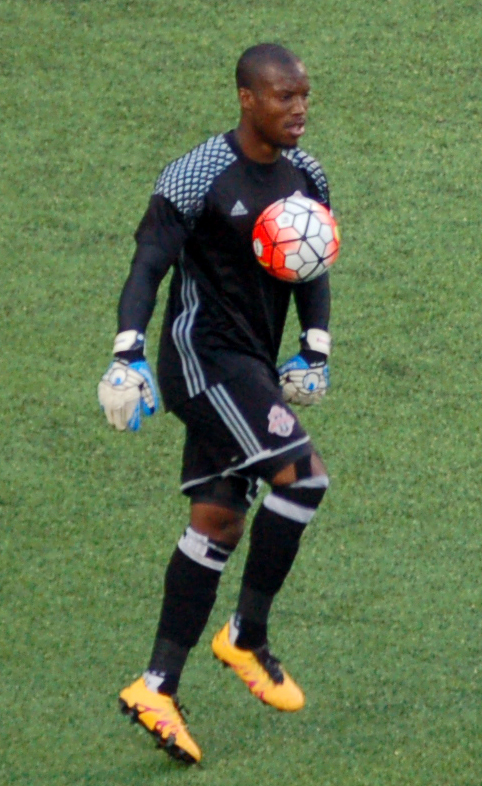
Roberts playing for Toronto FC II in 2016

On 20 March 2015, Roberts was one of seven players loaned to Toronto FC II. He was joined by Alex Bono, Ashtone Morgan, Manny Aparicio, Jay Chapman, Chris Mannella and Jordan Hamilton. On 19 April, he made his debut in a 1–1 draw with the Vancouver Whitecaps FC 2. After making 15 appearances during the 2015 USL season, Roberts' loan was extended and he went on to make a further nine appearances for the club.

=== Woodbridge Strikers ===
Following an unsuccessful trial with United Soccer League club the Rochester Rhinos, Roberts signed with League1 Ontario club Woodbridge Strikers for the 2017 season. Recording nine clean sheets in 19 games, he was named League1 Ontario Goalkeeper of the Year on 10 November. Roberts was also named as a League1 Ontario First Team All Star as his team won the league championship.

He also appeared in every match as Woodbridge Strikers went on to clinch the League1 Ontario Cup. They saw off Sanjaxx Lions, FC London and North Mississauga before a 3–1 win against Vaughan in the final.

=== York University ===
In 2017, Roberts joined York University Lions while studying Liberal Arts & Professional Studies. He started six games in the regular season and all three in the Ontario University Athletics play-offs. He suffered just a single defeat while keeping clean sheets, including in the final of the Ontario University Athletics where they emerged successful.

=== Los Angeles FC ===
Roberts began the 2018 season on trial with United Soccer League club Ottawa Fury. He later featured for Major League Soccer side Los Angeles FC in their first ever pre-season match. He officially signed for the club on 30 May 2018. In November 2018, his contract option was declined by Los Angeles.

=== Forge FC ===
Roberts joined Canadian Premier League club Forge FC on 2 March 2019. He made his debut on 8 May 2019, recording a clean sheet in a 3–0 win over Pacific FC. He made eight league starts and one in the Canadian Championship that season on route to a CPL Championship win for Forge. On 8 January 2020, the club announced Roberts would not be returning for the 2020 season.

=== Return to League1 Ontario ===
In 2021, he joined League1 Ontario side 1812 FC Barrie as a player-coach. He was named the East Division Top Goalkeeper and an East Division All-Star.

In early 2022, he went on trial with Canadian Premier League club Valour FC. In March 2022, he joined Electric City FC in League1 Ontario. He was named a league Third Team All-Star in 2022.

=== New Zealand ===
In March 2023, he joined New Zealand Central League club Western Suburbs FC, via their partnership with Olé Football Academy.

== International career ==
=== Canada ===
In 2011, Roberts was called up to Canada Under-17s ahead of the 2011 FIFA Under-17 World Cup in Mexico. He headed to the tournament as the backup goalkeeper to Maxime Crépeau, but injuries forced Roberts to play in the second group stage game against England. In the 87th minute, with Canada trailing England 2–1, Roberts kicked the ball into the England box from inside his own half, which bounced over English keeper Jordan Pickford and into the back of the net. The goal was the first scored by a goalkeeper in any FIFA finals tournament, and earned Canada a point as the game ended 2–2. Roberts made a further two other appearances in the tournament as Canada failed to progress past the group stages.

On 30 March 2015, Roberts made his international debut at senior level in a 3–0 win against Puerto Rico. He replaced Milan Borjan in the 86th minute of the friendly. Later he represented his country for 2015 CONCACAF Gold Cup. Canada was eliminated from championship after group stage.

=== Guyana ===
As the only match Roberts played for Canada at senior level was a friendly, he could still change his affiliation to the national teams of Guyana or Jamaica, the countries of birth of his father and his mother, respectively. On 20 May 2019, he was named to Guyana's 40-man provisional squad for the 2019 CONCACAF Gold Cup. He was named to the final squad on 30 May. He debuted for Guyana in the final group stage match on 26 June at the Gold Cup against Trinidad and Tobago in a 1–1 draw.

== Personal life ==
Roberts was born in Toronto, Ontario to a Guyanese father and a Jamaican mother. He has one brother, Jamal, and moved to Brampton, Ontario aged six. He studied at Heart Lake Secondary School between 2009 and 2012, and joined York University five years later. In his spare time, Roberts has volunteered for the Toronto Humane Society, Youth Without Shelter, St Margaret's School and Young Street Mission.

== Career statistics ==
=== Club ===
As of 26 April 2025

| Club | League | Season | League | | Playoffs | | Cup | | Total | |
| Club | League | Season | Apps | Goals | Apps | Goals | Apps | Goals | Apps | Goals |
|---|---|---|---|---|---|---|---|---|---|---|
| Toronto FC II | 2015 | USL | 15 | 0 | — | | — | | 15 | 0 |
| Toronto FC II | 2016 | USL | 9 | 0 | — | | — | | 9 | 0 |
| Toronto FC II | Total | | 24 | 0 | 0 | 0 | 0 | 0 | 24 | 0 |
| Toronto FC | 2013 | Major League Soccer | 0 | 0 | — | | 0 | 0 | 0 | 0 |
| Toronto FC | 2014 | Major League Soccer | 0 | 0 | — | | 0 | 0 | 0 | 0 |
| Toronto FC | 2015 | Major League Soccer | 0 | 0 | 0 | 0 | 0 | 0 | 0 | 0 |
| Toronto FC | 2016 | Major League Soccer | 0 | 0 | 0 | 0 | 0 | 0 | 0 | 0 |
| Toronto FC | Total | | 0 | 0 | 0 | 0 | 0 | 0 | 0 | 0 |
| Wilmington Hammerheads (loan) | 2014 | USL | 17 | 0 | 0 | 0 | 0 | 0 | 17 | 0 |
| Woodbridge Strikers | 2017 | League1 Ontario | 20 | 0 | 1 | 0 | 4 | 0 | 25 | 0 |
| Los Angeles FC | 2018 | Major League Soccer | 0 | 0 | 0 | 0 | 0 | 0 | 0 | 0 |
| Forge FC | 2019 | Canadian Premier League | 8 | 0 | 0 | 0 | 1 | 0 | 9 | 0 |
| 1812 FC Barrie | 2021 | League1 Ontario | 12 | 0 | — | | — | | 12 | 0 |
| Electric City FC | 2022 | League1 Ontario | 17 | 0 | — | | — | | 17 | 0 |
| Western Suburbs FC | 2023 | Central League | 18 | 0 | — | | 2 | 0 | 20 | 0 |
| Western Suburbs FC | 2024 | Central League | 13 | 0 | 6 | 0 | 0 | 0 | 19 | 0 |
| Western Suburbs FC | 2025 | Central League | 4 | 0 | — | | 0 | 0 | 4 | 0 |
| Western Suburbs FC | Total | | 35 | 0 | 6 | 0 | 2 | 0 | 43 | 0 |
| Career Total | | | 133 | 0 | 7 | 0 | 7 | 0 | 147 | 0 |

=== International ===
As of match played 15 October 2024

| National team | Year | Apps | Goals |
|---|---|---|---|
Canada
| Canada | 2015 | 1 | 0 |
| Total | | 1 | 0 |
Guyana
| Guyana | 2019 | 3 | 0 |
| Guyana | 2020 | 0 | 0 |
| Guyana | 2021 | 0 | 0 |
| Guyana | 2022 | 3 | 0 |
| Guyana | 2023 | 5 | 0 |
| Guyana | 2024 | 7 | 0 |
| Total | | 18 | 0 |

== Honours ==
Toronto FC

- Canadian Championship: 2012, 2016

Woodbridge Strikers

- League1 Ontario Cup: 2017

Forge FC

- Canadian Premier League: 2019

Individual

- League1 Ontario Goalkeeper of the Year: 2017, 2021
- League1 Ontario First Team All Star: 2017, 2021
