= Monti Mohsen =

Canadian soccer player (born 2000)

Personal information
- Full name: Montther Mohsen
- Date of birth: June 13, 2000 (age 26)
- Place of birth: Ottawa, Ontario, Canada
- Height: 1.75 m (5 ft 9 in)
- Position: Left-back

Team information
- Current team: Burlington SC
- Number: 20

Youth career
- Ottawa St. Anthony SC
- Gloucester Hornets
- Ottawa South United
- Ottawa Internationals

Senior career*
Years	Team	Apps	(Gls)
2018	Ottawa Fury FC	1	(0)
2018	Sigma FC	3	(0)
2019–2021	Forge FC	20	(1)
2022–????	Shabab Al-Khalil SC		
2023	Ottawa South United	2	(0)
2024	Scrosoppi FC	2	(4)
2024	Blue Devils FC	11	(1)
2025–	Burlington SC	15	(7)
- * Club domestic league appearances and goals as of August 28, 2025

Montther "Monti" Mohsen (born June 13, 2000) is a Canadian soccer player who plays as a left-back for Burlington SC in League1 Ontario.

== Early life ==
Mohsen began playing soccer at age six with Ottawa St. Anthony SC. In 2017, Mohsen represented Team Ontario at the 2017 Canada Summer Games, where he scored the winning goal in a 1-0 victory over Team Alberta in the gold medal match. In April 2017, he began training with professional club Ottawa Fury FC.

== Club career ==
In March 2018, he signed a professional contract with Ottawa Fury FC of the USL Championship. In August 2018, he was released by the club.

Upon his release from Ottawa, Mohsen joined Sigma FC of League1 Ontario, making three league appearances and three playoff appearances in the remainder of the season.

In March 2019, he signed with Canadian Premier League club Forge FC. He scored his first professional goal on September 5, 2019 against Pacific FC. In February 2021, he re-signed with the club for the 2021 season.

In July, 2022, Mohsen signed with West Bank Premier League club Shabab Al-Khalil SC.

In 2023, he played with Ottawa South United in Ligue1 Québec. In 2024, he began the year with Scrosoppi FC, scoring a hat trick on May 26, in a 5-1 victory over Guelph United FC. Afterwards, he switched clubs, joining Blue Devils FC for the remainder of the 2024 season. In 2025, he played with Burlington SC.

== International career ==
Mohsen was born in Canada to an Iraqi (Palestinian) father and a Syrian mother.

In April 2017, Mohsen was called up to the Canadian U17 team for a camp ahead of the 2017 CONCACAF U-17 Championship, where he was the final cut ahead of the tournament, although he travelled and trained with the team throughout the tournament.

== Career statistics ==
As of August 28, 2024

Club	Season	League			Playoffs		Domestic Cup		League Cup		Continental		Total	
Club	Season	Division	Apps	Goals	Apps	Goals	Apps	Goals	Apps	Goals	Apps	Goals	Apps	Goals
Ottawa Fury FC	2018	USL	1	0	–		0	0	–		–		1	0
Sigma FC	2018	League1 Ontario	3	0	3	0	–		0	0	–		6	0
Forge FC	2019	Canadian Premier League	9	1	0	0	0	0	–		0	0	9	1
Forge FC	2020	Canadian Premier League	3	0	0	0	–		–		1	0	4	0
Forge FC	2021	Canadian Premier League	8	0	0	0	0	0	–		0	0	8	0
Forge FC	Total		20	1	0	0	0	0	0	0	1	0	21	1
Ottawa South United	2023	Ligue1 Québec	2	0	–		–		0	0	–		2	0
Scrosoppi FC	2024	League1 Ontario Premier	2	4	–		–		0	0	–		2	4
Blue Devils FC	2024	League1 Ontario Premier	11	1	–		–		0	0	–		11	1
Burlington SC	2025	League1 Ontario Premier	15	7	–		–		2	0	–		17	7
Career total			54	13	3	0	0	0	2	0	1	0	60	13

== Honours ==
Forge FC

- Canadian Premier League: 2019, 2020
