= Jelani Smith =

Professional footballer (born 1991)

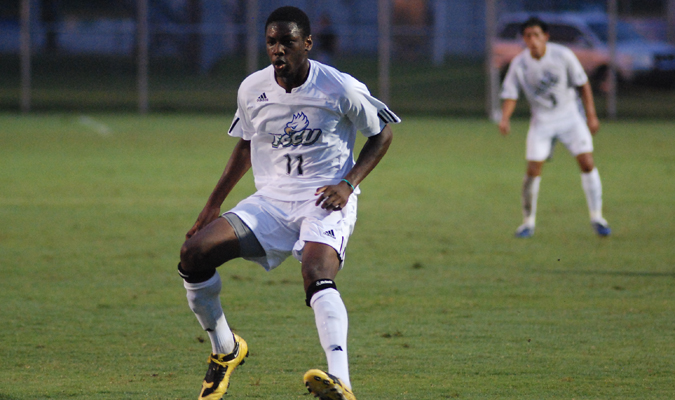
- Smith in action against USF in 2009

Personal information
- Full name: Jelani Akil Smith
- Date of birth: January 1, 1991 (age 35)
- Place of birth: Mississauga, Ontario, Canada
- Positions: Defender; forward

College career
Years	Team	Apps	(Gls)
2009–2011	Florida Gulf Coast Eagles	49	(5)

Senior career*
Years	Team	Apps	(Gls)
2007	Canadian Lions		
2008	Italia Shooters	11	(1)
2010–2011	Toronto Lynx	11	(1)
2013–2014	Sturm Graz II	3	(0)
2016	SSV Jeddeloh	7	(0)
2017–2018	Sigma FC	31	(0)
Total		63	(2)

International career
2017–2018	Guyana	3	(0)
- * Club domestic league appearances and goals

Jelani Akil Smith (born January 1, 1991) is former footballer who serves as director of soccer operations for Forge FC of the Canadian Premier League. Born in Canada, he represented Guyana at international level.

== Club career ==
Smith began playing football at the youth level with the Ontario U-16 Provincial team, and at the National Training Center. In 2007, he became one of the youngest players to play in the Canadian Soccer League with the Canadian Lions. The following season he was transferred to the Italia Shooters, where he clinched the International Division title. In 2009, he pursued College soccer by enrolling with Florida Gulf Coast Eagles, and during the off season he played in the USL Premier Development League with the Toronto Lynx for two seasons.

In 2013, he went abroad to sign with Sturm Graz, where he mostly featured in the Regionalliga Mitte. In 2016, he played in the Niedersachsenliga with SSV Jeddeloh, and returned to Canada to play with Sigma FC in League1 Ontario.

== International career ==
On May 25, 2010, he was called to a Canada U-20 camp in Netherlands by head coach Valerio Gazzola. Smith made his international debut for the Guyana national football team on November 14, 2017, in a friendly match against Trinidad and Tobago.

== Managerial career ==
Initially brought on as a player for Canadian Premier League side Forge FC, Smith was instead signed as the club's manager of soccer operations. In May 2023, he was promoted as the club's new Director Of Soccer Operations.

== Personal ==
He is the younger brother of Jamaal Smith, who was also a soccer player for Guyana.
