= Justin Stoddart =

Canadian soccer player (born 1995)

Personal information
- Full name: Justin Stoddart
- Date of birth: 3 November 1995 (age 31)
- Place of birth: Brampton, Ontario, Canada
- Height: 1.75 m (5 ft 9 in)
- Position: Midfielder

College career
Years	Team	Apps	(Gls)
2015	Temple Owls	18	(3)
2017	Oakland Golden Grizzlies	12	(0)

Senior career*
Years	Team	Apps	(Gls)
2016–2019	Sigma FC	61	(19)
2019	Forge FC	1	(0)
- * Club domestic league appearances and goals as of 8 January 2020

Justin Stoddart (born 3 November 1995) is a Canadian professional soccer player who plays as a midfielder.

== Club career ==
=== Sigma FC ===
In 2016, Stoddart played for Sigma FC in League1 Ontario, scoring seven goals in nineteen appearances. The following year, he made thirteen appearances for Sigma, scoring four goals. In 2018, Stoddart made fourteen league appearances, scoring two goals, and made another three appearances in the League1 Ontario playoffs. In 2019, Stoddart scored six goals in fifteen league appearances and made another two appearances in the playoffs.

=== Forge FC ===
On 15 September 2019, Stoddart signed his first professional contract with Canadian Premier League side Forge FC. On 6 October 2019, he made his only appearance with Forge, entering in the 76th minute as a substitute in a 1–0 win over York9 FC. On 8 January 2020, the club announced Stoddart would not return for the 2020 season.
