= Jay Wheeldon =

English footballer

Personal information
- Full name: Jonathan Wheeldon
- Date of birth: 28 August 1988 (age 38)
- Place of birth: Plymouth, England
- Height: 1.85 m (6 ft 1 in)
- Position: Defender

Youth career
- Swindon Town
- Exeter City
- Plymouth Argyle

Senior career*
Years	Team	Apps	(Gls)
2006–2007	Torquay United	0	(0)
2008–2011	Montegnée	84	(8)
2011–2013	Hungerford Town	33	(2)
2015–2018	Calgary Foothills	40	(3)
2019–2020	Cavalry FC	32	(0)
Total		179	(13)

Managerial career
- 2021–2023: Calgary Foothills
- 2024-: Cavalry FC (assistant)
- * Club domestic league appearances and goals

Jonathan "Jay" Wheeldon (born 28 August 1988) is an English football coach and former player who serves as assistant coach of Cavalry FC.

== Career ==
=== Early career ===
After spending many of his youth years with English academies Exeter City and Plymouth Argyle, Wheeldon signed his first professional contract with Torquay United in League Two. Wheeldon would go on to spend some time in Belgium with Montegnée before returning home to play for non-league club Hungerford Town.

=== Calgary Foothills ===
From 2015 to 2018 Wheeldon played under his brother, Tommy Wheeldon Jr. with Calgary Foothills. In 2018 the club captured the PDL Championship.

=== Cavalry FC ===
Wheeldon signed with Cavalry FC on 13 March 2019. He made his debut in their inaugural game against York9 on 4 May. Wheeldon went on to set an 18 match unbeaten streak in the first season which was the record for any player across the division. Wheeldon re-signed with Cavalry for the 2020 season on 29 January 2020. On 26 January 2021, Cavalry announced that Wheeldon had left the club in order to pursue a career in coaching.

== Coaching career ==
Wheeldon began coaching in Calgary 2012 serving as technical director of Calgary Northside SC. In 2013, Wheeldon became manager of the Calgary Foothills Skills Academy, a role he retained after returning to professional football in 2019. By 2021, Wheeldon had completed his Canada Soccer A License, and had previously obtained a UEFA B License moved into the role of technical Director with Calgary Foothills along with becoming head coach of the Calgary Foothills U23 team in June 2021. Wheeldon went on to win the first League1 Alberta season in 2023, before being named assistant coach and technical director with Cavalry FC.

== Coaching statistics ==
The following statistics are for club teams only (playoff and cup matches are included).

As of July 9th, 2023

Coaching record by team and tenure
Team	Nat.	League	From	To	Record							
Team	Nat.	League	From	To	G	W	D	L	GF	GA	GD	Win %
Calgary Foothills	CAN	League1 Alberta	2023		9	7	2	0	23	5	+18	77.78

== Honours ==
Calgary Foothills

- PDL Championship: 2018
- League1 Alberta: 2023

Cavalry FC

- Canadian Premier League Finals
  - Runners-up: 2019
- Canadian Premier League (Regular season):
  - Champions: Spring 2019, Fall 2019

== Personal life ==
Wheeldon is a lifelong supporter of Everton FC.
