= Taylor McNamara (soccer) =

Canadian soccer player

Personal information
- Full name: Taylor Mikael McNamara
- Date of birth: December 4, 1987 (age 38)
- Place of birth: Mississauga, Ontario, Canada
- Height: 5 ft 10 in (1.78 m)
- Position: Midfielder

College career
Years	Team	Apps	(Gls)
2005–2008	Albany Great Danes	73	(2)

Senior career*
Years	Team	Apps	(Gls)
2007–2010	Toronto Lynx	56	(6)
2011–2012	Dayton Dutch Lions	41	(0)
2013–2014	Toronto Lynx		
2015–2018	Oakville Blue Devils FC	50+	(5+)
- * Club domestic league appearances and goals as of September 2, 2018

Taylor Mikael McNamara (born December 4, 1987) is a retired Canadian soccer player who formerly played for the Oakville Blue Devils FC.

== Career ==
=== Youth and amateur ===
McNamara attended Iona Catholic Secondary School in his native city, Mississauga. He played for the junior club team of professional side Toronto Lynx, helping the team win its division and advance to the semifinals of the North American championships as well as advance to the title game of the Dallas Cup, before coming to the United States in 2005 to play college soccer at the University at Albany, SUNY. With Albany, McNamara was named to the America East Academic Honor Roll as a freshman in 2005, was named to the America East Commissioner’s Academic Honor Roll and his team's MVP as a sophomore in 2006 and as a junior in 2007, and was an ESPN All-Academic All-American selection.

During his college years McNamara also played four seasons in the USL Premier Development League for the Toronto Lynx, scoring 6 goals in 56 appearances for the club.

=== Professional ===
McNamara turned professional in 2011 when he signed with Dayton Dutch Lions of the USL Professional Division. He made his professional debut on April 23, 2011 in a 3-2 loss to Rochester Rhinos. McNamara re-signed with Dayton in February 2012.
