= 2020 Cavalry FC season =

Cavalry FC
2020 season
- President: Ian Allison
- Head coach: Tommy Wheeldon Jr.
- Stadium: ATCO Field
- Canadian Premier League: 3rd
- Canadian Championship: Did not qualify
- Top goalscorer: League: Jordan Brown; Nathan Mavila (3 each); All: Jordan Brown; Nathan Mavila (3 each)
Home colours	Away colours

The 2020 Cavalry FC season was the second season in the history of Cavalry FC. In the previous season, Cavalry won both the spring and fall seasons but lost in the finals to Forge FC.

On March 20, 2020 the league announced a postponement of the start of the season due to the COVID-19 pandemic.

== Squad ==
As of September 9, 2020

No.	Player	Nationality	Position(s)	Date of birth (age)	Previous club
Goalkeepers
1	Marco Carducci	(Canada)	GK	September 24, 1996 (aged 24)	(Canada) Calgary Foothills
22	Niko Giantsopoulos	(Canada)	GK	June 24, 1994 (aged 26)	(Australia) Launceston City
Defenders
3	Nathan Mavila	(England)	LB	October 15, 1995 (aged 25)	(England) Dulwich Hamlet
4	Dominick Zator	(Canada)	CB	September 18, 1994 (aged 26)	(Canada) Calgary Foothills
5	Mason Trafford	(Canada)	CB	August 21, 1986 (aged 34)	(United States) Miami City
12	Dean Northover	(Canada)	FB	September 4, 1991 (aged 29)	(Canada) Calgary Foothills
14	Jonathan Wheeldon	(England)	CB	August 28, 1989 (aged 31)	(Canada) Calgary Foothills
21	Mohamed Farsi	(Canada)	FB	December 15, 1999 (aged 21)	(Canada) AS Blainville
25	Robert Boskovic	(Canada)	CB	July 1, 1998 (aged 22)	(Canada) Toronto FC II
Midfielders
6	Nik Ledgerwood	(Canada)	DM / RB	January 16, 1985 (aged 35)	(Canada) Calgary Foothills
8	Elijah Adekugbe	(Canada)	MF	July 17, 1996 (aged 24)	(Canada) Calgary Foothills
10	Sergio Camargo	(Canada)	AM	August 16, 1994 (aged 26)	(Canada) Calgary Foothills
15	Elliot Simmons	(Canada)	CM	February 5, 1998 (aged 22)	(Canada) HFX Wanderers
16	Bruno Zebie	(Canada)	LM	August 14, 1995 (aged 25)	(Canada) FC Edmonton
17	Nico Pasquotti	(Canada)	RW	October 18, 1995 (aged 25)	(Canada) Calgary Foothills
23	Tofa Fakunle	(Canada)	AM	January 11, 1995 (aged 25)	(Canada) Calgary Foothills
	Richard Luca (Note: Player is signed, but hasn't been added to the 2020 roster because of difficulties getting into Canada due to the COVID-19 pandemic)	(Brazil)	LW / RW / AM	January 6, 1998 (aged 22)	(Brazil) Aparecidense
Forwards
7	Oliver Minatel	(Brazil)	ST / LW / RW	August 29, 1992 (aged 28)	(Australia) South Melbourne
9	Jordan Brown	(England)	ST	November 10, 1996 (aged 24)	(Czech Republic) Znojmo
19	Jair Córdova	(Peru)	ST	August 18, 1996 (aged 24)	(Peru) Alianza Universidad
20	José Hernández	(Canada)	ST	March 19, 2000 (aged 20)	(Canada) Pacific FC
24	Aribim Pepple	(Canada)	ST	December 25, 2002 (aged 18)	(Canada) Calgary Foothills
29	Marcus Haber	(Canada)	CF	January 11, 1989 (aged 31)	(Canada) Pacific FC

== Transfers ==
=== In ===
No.	Pos.	Player	Transferred from	Fee/notes	Date	Source
20	FW	(Canada) José Hernández	(Canada) Pacific FC	Free transfer	December 11, 2019	
19	FW	(Peru) Jair Córdova	(Peru) Alianza Universidad	Undisclosed	January 22, 2020	
16	MF	(Canada) Bruno Zebie	(Canada) FC Edmonton	Free Transfer	February 5, 2020	
	MF	(Brazil) Richard Luca	(Mexico) UANL	Free Transfer	February 19, 2020	
15	MF	(Canada) Elliot Simmons	(Canada) HFX Wanderers	Free Transfer	February 26, 2020	
21	DF	(Canada) Mohamed Farsi	(Canada) AS Blainville	Free Transfer	April 15, 2020	
29	FW	(Canada) Marcus Haber	(Canada) Pacific FC	Free Transfer	July 31, 2020	

==== Draft picks ====
Cavalry selected the following players in the 2019 CPL–U Sports Draft on November 11, 2019. Draft picks are not automatically signed to the team roster. Only those who are signed to a contract will be listed as transfers in.

Round	Selection	Player	Position	Nationality	University
1	6	Gabriel Bitar	ST	Canada	Carleton Ravens
2	9	Moe El Gandour	CM	Canada	Mount Royal Cougars

==== Loans in ====
No.	Pos.	Player	Loaned from	Fee/notes	Date	Source
25	DF	(Canada) Robert Boskovic	(Canada) Toronto FC II	Season-long loan	March 11, 2020	

=== Out ===
No.	Pos.	Player	Transferred to	Fee/notes	Date	Source
15	DF	(Canada) Joel Waterman	(Canada) Montreal Impact	Undisclosed	January 14, 2020	
8	MF	(Germany) Julian Büscher	(Germany) TuS Haltern	Contract expired	February 1, 2020	
21	MF	(Canada) Malyk Hamilton	(Canada) Atlético Ottawa	Contract expired	March 6, 2020	
23	FW	(Republic of the Congo) Dominique Malonga	(Bulgaria) Lokomotiv Plovdiv	Contract expired	March 7, 2020	
18	MF	(Canada) Mauro Eustáquio	(Portugal) Caldas	Contract expired	July 21, 2020	
2	DF	(Canada) Chris Serban		Contract expired	August 7, 2020	
13	MF	(Canada) Victor Loturi		Contract expired	August 7, 2020	
20	MF	(Colombia) Carlos Patiño		Contract expired	August 7, 2020	

==== Loans out ====
No.	Pos.	Player	Loaned to	Fee/notes	Date	Source
11	MF	(Honduras) José Escalante	(Honduras) C.D.S. Vida	Loaned until January 2021	September 9, 2020	

== Canadian Premier League ==
Match times are Mountain Daylight Time (UTC−6).

=== First stage ===
==== Table ====
Pos	Team	Pld	W	D	L	GF	GA	GD	Pts	Qualification
1	Cavalry	7	4	1	2	10	7	+3	13	Advance to group stage
2	HFX Wanderers	7	3	3	1	12	7	+5	12 (Note: Head-to-head points: HFX Wanderers 1, Forge 1. Goal differential: HFX Wanderers +5, Forge +4)	Advance to group stage
3	Forge	7	3	3	1	13	9	+4	12	Advance to group stage
4	Pacific	7	3	2	2	10	8	+2	11	Advance to group stage
5	York9	7	2	4	1	8	7	+1	10	
6	Valour	7	2	2	3	8	9	−1	8 (Note: Head-to-head points: Valour 3, Atlético Ottawa 0.)	
7	Atlético Ottawa	7	2	2	3	7	12	−5	8	
8	FC Edmonton	7	0	1	6	5	14	−9	1	

Source: CanPL.ca
Rules for classification: 1) points; 2) head-to-head points; 3) goal differential; 4) goals for; 5) total wins; 6) U-21 minutes; 7) coin toss or drawing of lots.

==== Results by match ====
Match	1	2	3	4	5	6	7
Result	D	W	W	W	L	L	W
Position	1	1	1	1	2	2	1

Updated to match(es) played on September 6, 2020. Source: #Matches
W = Win; D = Draw; L = Loss

==== Matches ====
August 13 1	Forge FC	2–2	Cavalry FC	Charlottetown, Prince Edward Island
6:00pm	Zajac (yellow card) 15'; Novak 26'; Krutzen (yellow card) 58'; Bekker 71'; Grant (yellow card) 75'; Samuel (yellow card) 90+3'	Report	Adekugbe (yellow card) 6'; Zator 11'; Mavila 90+4' (pen.)	Stadium: Alumni Field; Referee: Yusri Rudolf

August 16 2	Valour FC	0–2	Cavalry FC	Charlottetown, Prince Edward Island
10:00am	Aird (yellow card) 37'; Campbell (yellow card) 69'	Report	Camargo (yellow card) 11' (goal) 33' (pen.); Haber 29'; Adekugbe (yellow card) 46'; Boskovic (yellow card) 49'	Stadium: Alumni Field; Referee: Juan Marquez

August 20 3	FC Edmonton	0–2	Cavalry FC	Charlottetown, Prince Edward Island
6:00pm	Ameobi (yellow card) 31'; Mohammed (red card) 49'	Report	Brown 44', 90+5' (pen.)	Stadium: Alumni Field; Referee: Yusri Rudolf

August 23 4	Cavalry FC	2–1	HFX Wanderers FC	Charlottetown, Prince Edward Island
6:00pm	Mavila 29'; Brown 90'; Wheeldon (yellow card) 90+2'	Report	Restrepo (yellow card) 72'; Schaale (yellow card) 85'; Garcia 90+3' (pen.)	Stadium: Alumni Field; Referee: Pierre-Luc Lauzière

August 27 5	Atlético Ottawa	2–0	Cavalry FC	Charlottetown, Prince Edward Island
1:00pm	John (yellow card) 32'; Acuña (yellow card) 45+3'; Fisk 61'; Shaw 64'	Report		Stadium: Alumni Field; Referee: Myriam Marcotte

August 30 6	Cavalry FC	1–2	Pacific FC	Charlottetown, Prince Edward Island
10:00am	Haber (yellow card) 20'; Mavila 55' (pen.); Boskovic (yellow card) 72'; Farsi (yellow card) 90+5'	Report	Bustos 22'; Díaz 26'; Haynes (yellow card) 55'	Stadium: Alumni Field; Referee: Juan Marquez

September 5 7	Cavalry FC	1–0	York9 FC	Charlottetown, Prince Edward Island
1:00pm	Haber 69'; Ledgerwood (yellow card) 89'	Report	Gasparotto (yellow card) 46'; Di Chiara (yellow card) 81'; Telfer (yellow card) 87'	Stadium: Alumni Field; Referee: Pierre-Luc Lauzière

=== Group stage ===
==== Table ====
Pos	Team	Pld	W	D	L	GF	GA	GD	Pts	Qualification
1	Forge	3	2	1	0	4	1	+3	7	Advance to final
2	HFX Wanderers	3	1	1	1	3	7	−4	4	Advance to final
3	Cavalry	3	1	0	2	4	4	0	3 (Note: Head-to-head points: Cavalry 3, Pacific 0.)	
4	Pacific	3	1	0	2	6	5	+1	3	

Source: CanPL.ca
Rules for classification: 1) points; 2) head-to-head points; 3) goal differential; 4) goals for; 5) total wins; 6) U-21 minutes; 7) coin toss or drawing of lots.

==== Results by round ====
Round	1	2	3
Result	W	L	L
Position	1	3	3

Updated to match(es) played on September 15, 2020. Source: #Matches
W = Win; D = Draw; L = Loss

==== Matches ====
September 9 1	Cavalry FC	3–1	Pacific FC	Charlottetown, Prince Edward Island
6:00pm	Nikolas Ledgerwood 15'; Adekugbe 49'; Farsi (yellow card) 66' (goal) 75'; Simmons (yellow card) 70'	Report	Zator 53' (o.g.); Heard (yellow card) 64'	Stadium: Alumni Field; Referee: David Barrie

September 12 2	Cavalry FC	1–2	HFX Wanderers FC	Charlottetown, Prince Edward Island
1:00pm	Wheeldon (yellow card) 2' (yellow-red card) 11'; Carducci (yellow card) 40'; Córdova 80'; Mavila (yellow card) 83'	Report	Garcia 12'; Rampersad (yellow card) 30'; Morelli 41'; Oxner (yellow card) 90+4'	Stadium: Alumni Field; Referee: Mathieu Souaré

September 15 3	Cavalry FC	0–1	Forge FC	Charlottetown, Prince Edward Island
11:00am	Hernández (yellow card) 90+2'	Report	Babouli 27'; Bekker (yellow card) 35'; Edgar (yellow card) 69'	Stadium: Alumni Field; Referee: Filip Dujic

== Statistics ==
=== Squad and statistics ===
As of September 15, 2020

No.	Pos	Nat	Player	Total		Canadian Premier League	
No.	Pos	Nat	Player	Apps	Goals	Apps	Goals
1	GK	(Canada) CAN	Marco Carducci	9	0	9+0	0
2	DF	(Canada) CAN	Dean Northover	7	0	4+3	0
3	DF	(England) ENG	Nathan Mavila	9	3	8+1	3
4	DF	(Canada) CAN	Dominick Zator	10	1	10+0	1
5	DF	(Canada) CAN	Mason Trafford	8	0	8+0	0
6	MF	(Canada) CAN	Nik Ledgerwood	7	1	5+2	1
7	FW	(Brazil) BRA	Oliver	7	0	6+1	0
8	MF	(Canada) CAN	Elijah Adekugbe	9	1	7+2	1
9	FW	(England) ENG	Jordan Brown	10	3	7+3	3
10	MF	(Canada) CAN	Sergio Camargo	2	1	2+0	1
14	DF	(England) ENG	Jonathan Wheeldon	6	0	6+0	0
15	MF	(Canada) CAN	Elliot Simmons	10	0	6+4	0
16	MF	(Canada) CAN	Bruno Zebie	10	0	5+5	0
17	FW	(Canada) CAN	Nico Pasquotti	8	0	7+1	0
19	FW	(Peru) PER	Jair Córdova	4	1	0+4	1
20	FW	(Canada) CAN	José Hernández	3	0	1+2	0
21	DF	(Canada) CAN	Mohamed Farsi	10	1	7+3	1
22	GK	(Canada) CAN	Niko Giantsopoulos	1	0	1+0	0
23	MF	(Canada) CAN	Tofa Fakunle	1	0	0+1	0
24	FW	(Canada) CAN	Aribim Pepple	6	0	0+6	0
25	DF	(Canada) CAN	Robert Boskovic	6	0	6+0	0
29	FW	(Canada) CAN	Marcus Haber	9	2	5+4	2

=== Top scorers ===
Rank	Nat.	Player	Pos.	Canadian Premier League	TOTAL
1	(England)	Nathan Mavila	DF	3	3
1	(England)	Jordan Brown	FW	3	3
3	(Canada)	Marcus Haber	FW	2	2
4	(Canada)	Sergio Camargo	MF	1	1
4	(Canada)	Dominick Zator	DF	1	1
4	(Canada)	Elijah Adekugbe	MF	1	1
4	(Canada)	Mohamed Farsi	MF	1	1
4	(Canada)	Nik Ledgerwood	MF	1	1
4	(Peru)	Jair Córdova	FW	1	1
Totals				14	14

Updated to match played September 15, 2020
Source: Canadian Premier League

=== Top assists ===
Rank	Nat.	Player	Pos.	Canadian Premier League	TOTAL
1	(Canada)	Elijah Adekugbe	MF	1	1
1	(Canada)	Mohamed Farsi	MF	1	1
1	(Canada)	Nik Ledgerwood	MF	1	1
1	(Brazil)	Oliver	FW	1	1
1	(England)	Nathan Mavila	DF	1	1
Totals				5	5

Updated to match played September 15, 2020
Source: Canadian Premier League

=== Clean sheets ===
Rank	Nat.	Player	Canadian Premier League	TOTAL
1	(Canada)	Marco Carducci	3	3
Totals			3	3

Updated to match played September 15, 2020
Source: Canadian Premier League

=== Disciplinary record ===
No.	Pos.	Nat.	Player	Canadian Premier League		TOTAL	
No.	Pos.	Nat.	Player	Yellow card	Red card	Yellow card	Red card
1	GK	(Canada)	Marco Carducci	1	0	1	0
3	DF	(Canada)	Nathan Mavila	1	0	1	0
6	DF	(Canada)	Nik Ledgerwood	1	0	1	0
8	MF	(Canada)	Elijah Adekugbe	2	0	2	0
10	MF	(Canada)	Sergio Camargo	1	0	1	0
14	DF	(Canada)	Jonathan Wheeldon	1	1	1	1
15	MF	(Canada)	Elliot Simmons	1	0	1	0
20	FW	(Canada)	José Hernández	1	0	1	0
21	DF	(Canada)	Mohamed Farsi	2	0	2	0
25	DF	(Canada)	Robert Boskovic	2	0	2	0
29	FW	(Canada)	Marcus Haber	1	0	1	0
Totals				14	1	14	1

Updated to match played September 15, 2020
Source: Canadian Premier League
