= 2019 Cavalry FC season =

Cavalry FC
2019 season
- President: Ian Allison
- Head coach: Tommy Wheeldon Jr.
- Stadium: ATCO Field
- Canadian Premier League: Spring: 1st Fall: 1st Overall: 1st
- CPL finals: Runners-up
- Canadian Championship: Semi-finals
- Top goalscorer: League: Dominique Malonga (11); All: Dominique Malonga (13)
- Highest home attendance: 5,831 (November 2 vs. Forge FC)
- Lowest home attendance: 1,938 (October 9 vs. Forge FC)
- Average home league attendance: League: 3,292; All: 3,668
Home colours	Away colours

The 2019 Cavalry FC season was the first season in Cavalry FC's history, as well as the first season in Canadian Premier League history.

== Overview ==
On May 17, 2018 Cavalry FC was unveiled as Calgary's team in the new Canadian Premier League, with then Calgary Foothills FC head coach Tommy Wheeldon Jr. chosen to be the first head coach in Cavalry history. On November 29, 2018, Cavalry signed its first ever players: veteran Nik Ledgerwood and young talent Sergio Camargo, both from the Foothills. Overall, 12 of the players on the Cavalry squad came from the Foothills. Cavalry's first ever international signing was Brazilian striker Oliver Minatel. Cavalry signed two of its picks in the 2018 CPL–U Sports Draft, first overall pick Gabriel Bitar and fourteenth overall pick Joel Waterman.

On May 3, 2019, Cavalry played their first ever game, at home against York9 FC. Jordan Brown scored the first goal in Cavalry FC history, with Dominick Zator adding a second and Cavalry hanging on for a 2–1 victory. Cavalry went on to win their first seven games, until succumbing to Forge FC in a 1–0 defeat. However, Cavalry rebounded and defeated York9 2–0 in their next game, clinching the spring season title and a berth in the 2019 Canadian Premier League Finals.

In the Canadian Championship, Cavalry faced Pacific FC in the first round and won both legs. Next, they were up against Forge. In the first leg in Hamilton, Forge struck first, but there was late drama when Forge FC goalkeeper Quillan Roberts received a red card in stoppage time, with no substitutions remaining. Cavalry was given a penalty shot, and Dominique Malonga beat midfielder turned goalkeeper Alexander Achinioti-Jönsson to tie the game. Tensions were high after the goal, and Cavalry players accused a member of Forge's coaching staff of making racist remarks. The match ended with a melee between Cavalry and Forge players, establishing a rivalry that would continue to take shape for the rest of the season. In the second leg, Forge opened the scoring again, but goals from Malonga and Camargo meant that it was Cavalry who advanced to the quarterfinals. Cavalry faced MLS club Vancouver Whitecaps FC in the quarterfinals and in the first leg the Cavs held the Whitecaps to a 0–0 draw at home. In the second leg at BC Place in Vancouver, Brown and Zator scored in a 2–1 victory and goalkeeper Marco Carducci, who used to play for the Whitecaps, was praised for his performance. Cavalry became the first CPL team to defeat an MLS team, and advanced to the semifinals, where they were awaited by the Montreal Impact. In the first leg of the semifinals, Ignacio Piatti scored twice for the Impact, but Cavalry was given hope when Camargo scored later in the game. It was not meant to be, however, as Cavalry couldn't get another one and Ledgerwood received a second yellow card, forcing Cavalry to play the last part of the game with 10 men. A 1–0 defeat back in Calgary ended the Cinderella story and the Impact ended up defeating Toronto FC in the finals to become the champions.

Although Cavalry was already secured a spot in the CPL finals, they won the fall season as well, causing Forge FC to qualify as the other finalist on the basis of having the next best overall record. In the first leg of the finals in Hamilton, Waterman was given a red card and Forge star and CPL top scorer Tristan Borges was given a penalty kick, but it was stopped by Carducci. However, Borges scored ten minutes later and the game ended at 1–0. Neither team could score in the second leg, until in stoppage time when all of Cavalry's outfield players were pressing in the attacking zone, and Forge managed to break out. David Choinière managed to score on the resulting 2 on 0, securing Cavalry's fate as runners up.

Over the course of the season, Carducci and Zator were called up to the Canada men's national soccer team once each, but neither saw action. Carducci was the first Canadian Premier League player to be called up to the national team.

Despite losing in the finals, Cavalry finished first overall in the regular season, and Wheeldon Jr. stated that he would like to bring most of the players back for the next season. Wheeldon Jr. was named coach of the year, and Carducci was named best goalkeeper and Volkswagen Premier Performer, while Malonga was nominated for best player.

== Squad ==
As of November 2, 2019.

No.	Player	Nationality	Position(s)	Date of birth (age)	Previous club
Goalkeepers
1	Marco Carducci	(Canada)	GK	September 24, 1996 (aged 23)	(Canada) Calgary Foothills
22	Niko Giantsopoulos	(Canada)	GK	June 24, 1994 (aged 25)	(Australia) Launceston City
Defenders
2	Chris Serban	(Canada)	RB	November 15, 1995 (aged 24)	(Canada) Calgary Foothills
3	Nathan Mavila	(England)	LB	October 15, 1995 (aged 24)	(England) Dulwich Hamlet
4	Dominick Zator	(Canada)	CB	September 18, 1994 (aged 25)	(Canada) Calgary Foothills
5	Mason Trafford	(Canada)	CB	August 21, 1986 (aged 33)	(United States) Miami FC
12	Dean Northover	(Canada)	FB	September 4, 1991 (aged 28)	(Canada) Calgary Foothills
14	Jonathan Wheeldon	(England)	CB	August 28, 1989 (aged 30)	(Canada) Calgary Foothills
15	Joel Waterman	(Canada)	CB	January 24, 1996 (aged 23)	(Canada) Trinity Western Spartans
Midfielders
6	Nik Ledgerwood	(Canada)	DM / RB	January 16, 1985 (aged 34)	(Canada) Calgary Foothills
8	Julian Büscher	(Germany)	CM	April 22, 1993 (aged 26)	(United States) LA Galaxy II
10	Sergio Camargo	(Canada)	AM	August 16, 1994 (aged 25)	(Canada) Calgary Foothills
11	José Escalante	(Honduras)	LW	May 29, 1995 (aged 24)	(Honduras) Juticalpa
13	Victor Loturi	(Canada)	CM	May 21, 2001 (aged 18)	(Canada) Calgary Northside Soccer
16	Elijah Adekugbe	(Canada)	MF	July 17, 1996 (aged 23)	(Canada) Calgary Foothills
17	Nico Pasquotti	(Canada)	RW	October 18, 1995 (aged 24)	(Canada) Calgary Foothills
18	Mauro Eustáquio	(Canada)	CM	February 10, 1993 (aged 26)	(United States) Penn FC
20	Carlos Patiño	(Colombia)	AM	August 18, 1995 (aged 24)	(Canada) Calgary Foothills
21	Malyk Hamilton	(Canada)	RW / RB	September 2, 1999 (aged 20)	(Canada) Toronto FC II
25	Tofa Fakunle	(Canada)	AM	January 11, 1995 (aged 24)	(Canada) Calgary Foothills
Forwards
7	Oliver Minatel	(Brazil)	ST / LW / RW	August 29, 1992 (aged 27)	(Australia) South Melbourne
9	Jordan Brown	(England)	ST	November 10, 1996 (aged 23)	(Czech Republic) Znojmo
23	Dominique Malonga	(Republic of the Congo)	ST	January 8, 1989 (aged 30)	(Greece) Chania
24	Aribim Pepple	(Canada)	ST	December 25, 2002 (aged 17)	(Canada) Calgary Foothills

== Transfers ==
=== In ===
No.	Pos.	Player	Transferred from	Fee/notes	Date	Source
6	MF	(Canada) Nik Ledgerwood	(Canada) Calgary Foothills	Free Transfer	November 29, 2018	
10	MF	(Canada) Sergio Camargo	(Canada) Calgary Foothills	Free Transfer	November 29, 2018	
1	GK	(Canada) Marco Carducci	(Canada) Calgary Foothills	Free Transfer	December 12, 2018	
2	DF	(Canada) Chris Serban	(Canada) Calgary Foothills	Free Transfer	December 12, 2018	
4	DF	(Canada) Dominick Zator	(Canada) Calgary Foothills	Free Transfer	December 12, 2018	
16	MF	(Canada) Elijah Adekugbe	(Canada) Calgary Foothills	Free Transfer	December 12, 2018	
7	FW	(Brazil) Oliver Minatel	(Australia) South Melbourne	Free Transfer	January 16, 2019	
22	GK	(Canada) Niko Giantsopoulos	(Australia) Launceston City	Free Transfer	January 23, 2019	
12	DF	(Canada) Dean Northover	(Canada) Calgary Foothills	Free Transfer	January 23, 2019	
20	MF	(Colombia) Carlos Patiño	(Canada) Calgary Foothills	Free Transfer	January 23, 2019	
17	MF	(Canada) Nico Pasquotti	(Canada) Calgary Foothills	Free Transfer	January 23, 2019	
9	FW	(England) Jordan Brown	(Czech Republic) Znojmo	Free Transfer	January 30, 2019	
15	DF	(Canada) Joel Waterman	(Canada) Trinity Western Spartans	Selected 14th overall in the 2018 CPL–U Sports Draft	February 6, 2019	
8	MF	(Germany) Julian Büscher	(United States) LA Galaxy II	Free Transfer	February 13, 2019	
3	DF	(England) Nathan Mavila	(England) Dulwich Hamlet	Free Transfer	February 20, 2019	
5	DF	(Canada) Mason Trafford	(United States) Miami FC	Free Transfer	February 27, 2019	
21	MF	(Canada) Malyk Hamilton	(Canada) Toronto FC II	Free Transfer	March 6, 2019	
14	DF	(England) Jonathan Wheeldon	(Canada) Calgary Foothills	Free Transfer	March 13, 2019	
18	MF	(Canada) Mauro Eustáquio	(United States) Penn FC	Free Transfer	March 20, 2019	
23	FW	(Republic of the Congo) Dominique Malonga	(Greece) Chania	Free Transfer	March 27, 2019	
11	MF	(Honduras) José Escalante	(Honduras) Juticalpa	Free Transfer	April 10, 2019	
13	MF	(Canada) Victor Loturi	(Canada) Calgary Northside Soccer	Free Transfer	April 17, 2019	
19	FW	(Canada) Gabriel Bitar	(Canada) Carleton Ravens	Selected 1st overall in the 2018 CPL–U Sports Draft	April 24, 2019	
24	FW	(Canada) Aribim Pepple	(Canada) Calgary Foothills	Free Transfer	August 9, 2019	
25	MF	(Canada) Tofa Fakunle	(Canada) Calgary Foothills	Free Transfer	August 28, 2019	

==== Draft picks ====
Cavalry FC selected the following players in the 2018 CPL–U Sports Draft on November 12, 2018. Draft picks are not automatically signed to the team roster. Only those who are signed to a contract will be listed as transfers in.

Round	Selection	Player	Pos.	Nationality	University
1	1	FW	Gabriel Bitar	Canada	Carleton Ravens
2	14	MF	Joel Waterman	Canada	Trinity Western Spartans
3	15	FW	Easton Ongaro	Canada	Alberta Golden Bears

=== Out ===
No.	Pos.	Player	Transferred to	Fee/notes	Date	Source
19	FW	(Canada) Gabriel Bitar	(Canada) Carleton Ravens	Developmental Contract expired	August 15, 2019	

== Competitions ==
Match times are Mountain Daylight Time (UTC−6).

=== Preseason ===
March 19	Cavalry FC	2–0	Vancouver Whitecaps U-23	Calgary, Alberta
	Deakin; Hamilton	Report		Stadium: Foothills Fieldhouse

March 30	Cavalry FC	2–0	FC Edmonton	Calgary, Alberta
	Pasquotti; Malonga (pen.)	Report	Yong-chan (yellow card) (yellow-red card)	Stadium: Southern Alberta Institute of Technology

April 7	Inter RD	0–4	Cavalry FC	Punta Cana, Dominican Republic
		Report	Camargo; Brown; Bitar; Ongaro

April 13	York9 FC	0–1	Cavalry FC	Punta Cana, Dominican Republic
		Report	Bitar

April 27	Cavalry FC	1–0	Calgary Foothills FC	Foothills County, Alberta
	Northover	Report		Stadium: ATCO Field

=== Canadian Premier League ===
==== Spring season ====
===== League table =====
Pos	Team	Pld	W	D	L	GF	GA	GD	Pts	Qualification
1	Cavalry	10	8	0	2	16	7	+9	24	2019 Canadian Premier League Finals
2	Forge	10	6	1	3	15	7	+8	19	2019 CONCACAF League preliminary round (Note: As winner of home and away matches between FC Edmonton, Forge FC, and Valour FC)
3	FC Edmonton	10	4	2	4	8	9	−1	14	
4	HFX Wanderers	10	3	2	5	8	11	−3	11	
5	Pacific	10	3	2	5	11	15	−4	11	
6	York9	10	2	5	3	9	11	−2	11	
7	Valour	10	3	0	7	8	15	−7	9	

Source: CanPL.ca
Rules for classification: 1) points; 2) total wins; 3) goal differential; 4) goals for; 5) away goal differential; 6) away goals for; 7) home goal differential; 8) home goals for; 9) coin toss or drawing of lots.

===== Results summary =====
Overall								Home						Away					
Pld	W	D	L	GF	GA	GD	Pts	W	D	L	GF	GA	GD	W	D	L	GF	GA	GD
10	8	0	2	16	7	+9	24	4	0	1	6	2	+4	4	0	1	10	5	+5

Last updated: July 1, 2019.
Source: canpl.ca

===== Results by match =====
Match	1	2	3	4	5	6	7	8	9	10
Ground	H	H	A	H	H	A	A	H	A	A
Result	W	W	W	W	W	W	W	L	W	L
Position	2	1	1	1	1	1	1	1	1	1

Updated to match(es) played on July 1, 2019. Source: #Matches
A = Away; H = Home; W = Win; D = Draw; L = Loss

===== Matches =====
May 4 1	Cavalry FC	2–1	York9 FC	Foothills County, Alberta
1:30 pm	Brown 26'; Northover (yellow card) 31'; Wheeldon (yellow card) 56'; Zator 78'; Oliver (yellow card) 90+3'	Report	Estevez (yellow card) 60'; Murofushi (yellow card) 68'; Furlano (yellow card) 81'; Adjei 83'	Stadium: ATCO Field; Attendance: 3,486; Referee: Drew Fischer

May 8 2	Cavalry FC	1–0	Valour FC	Foothills County, Alberta
7:00 pm	Büscher (yellow card) 51'; Dean Northover (yellow card) 78'; Adekugbe (yellow card) 82'; Escalante 86'	Report	Murrell (yellow card) 39'; Thomas (yellow card) 53'; Béland-Goyette (yellow card) 69'	Stadium: ATCO Field; Attendance: 2,055; Referee: Fabrizio Stasolla

May 12 3	Forge FC	1–2	Cavalry FC	Hamilton, Ontario
11:00 am	Borges 34'; Thomas (yellow card) 68'	Report	Ledgerwood 22'; Wheeldon (yellow card) 31'; Joel Waterman (yellow card) 81'; Pasquotti 90+5'	Stadium: Tim Hortons Field; Attendance: 5,912; Referee: Carol Anne Chenard

May 18 4 Wildrose Cup	Cavalry FC	1–0	FC Edmonton	Foothills County, Alberta
4:00 pm	Brown 45+1'; Adekugbe (yellow card) 66'	Report	Soria (yellow card) 9'	Stadium: ATCO Field; Attendance: 4,000; Referee: Alain Ruch

May 25 5	Cavalry FC	2–0	HFX Wanderers FC	Foothills County, Alberta
4:30 pm	Malonga 21', 56'; Pasquotti (yellow card) 53'	Report	Gutiérrez (yellow card) 76'	Stadium: ATCO Field; Attendance: 3,162; Referee: David Barrie

June 15 6 Wildrose Cup	FC Edmonton	0–3	Cavalry FC	Edmonton, Alberta
12:30 pm	Moses (yellow card) 33'; Zebie (yellow card) 54'	Report	Camargo (yellow card) 35' (goal) 66', 73'; Waterman (yellow card) 59'; Adekugbe (yellow card) 61'; Pasquotti 77'	Stadium: Clarke Stadium; Attendance: 3,256; Referee: Juan Marquez

June 19 7	HFX Wanderers FC	1–2	Cavalry FC	Halifax, Nova Scotia
4:00 pm	Iida (yellow card) 26'; Arnone (yellow card) 39'; Andre Rampersad 50' (yellow card) 71'	Report	Waterman (yellow card) 36'; Camargo 39'; Bona 41' (o.g.); Wheeldon (yellow card) 57'; Büscher (yellow card) 80'	Stadium: Wanderers Grounds; Attendance: 6,021; Referee: Yusri Rudolf

June 22 8	Cavalry FC	0–1	Forge FC	Foothills County, Alberta
4:00 pm		Report	Bekker 5' (yellow card) 87'; Owundi (yellow card) 38'; Samuel (yellow card) 40'; Thomas (yellow card) 89'	Stadium: ATCO Field; Attendance: 4,697; Referee: Silviu Petrescu

June 26 9	York9 FC	0–2	Cavalry FC	Toronto, Ontario
5:00 pm	Aparicio (yellow card) 22'; Di Chiara (yellow card) 69'	Report	Malonga (yellow card) 14' (goal) 24'; Büscher 35'; Pasquotti (yellow card) 65'	Stadium: York Lions Stadium; Attendance: 1,829; Referee: Pierre-Luc Lauzière

July 1 10	Pacific FC	3–1	Cavalry FC	Langford, British Columbia
4:00 pm	Alghamdi 48' (yellow card) 49'; González (yellow card) 51' (yellow-red card) 72'; Blasco 76'; Nakajima-Farran 90+7'	Report	Büscher (yellow card) 37'; Eustáquio (yellow card) 51' (yellow-red card) 90+6'; Mavila (yellow card) 56'; Loturi (yellow card) 58'; Malonga 61'; Northover (red card) 74'	Stadium: Westhills Stadium; Attendance: 2,781; Referee: Juan Marquez

==== Fall season ====
===== League table =====
Pos	Team	Pld	W	D	L	GF	GA	GD	Pts	Qualification
1	Cavalry	18	11	5	2	35	12	+23	38	2019 Canadian Premier League Finals
2	Forge	18	11	4	3	30	19	+11	37	
3	York9	18	7	2	9	30	26	+4	23	
4	Pacific	18	5	5	8	24	31	−7	20	
5	Valour	18	5	4	9	22	37	−15	19	
6	FC Edmonton	18	4	6	8	19	24	−5	18	
7	HFX Wanderers	18	3	8	7	13	24	−11	17	

Source: CanPL.ca
Rules for classification: 1) points; 2) total wins; 3) goal differential; 4) goals for; 5) away goal differential; 6) away goals for; 7) home goal differential; 8) home goals for; 9) coin toss or drawing of lots.

===== Results summary =====
Overall								Home						Away					
Pld	W	D	L	GF	GA	GD	Pts	W	D	L	GF	GA	GD	W	D	L	GF	GA	GD
18	11	5	2	35	12	+23	38	7	2	0	20	6	+14	4	3	2	15	6	+9

Last updated: October 19, 2019.
Source: canpl.ca

===== Results by match =====
Match	1	2	3	4	5	6	7	8	9	10	11	12	13	14	15	16	17	18
Ground	A	A	H	A	A	H	H	A	H	A	A	H	A	H	H	H	A	H
Result	W	W	W	D	D	D	W	L	D	W	W	W	D	W	W	W	L	W
Position	1	1	2	2	2	1	1	2	2	1	1	1	2	2	1	1	2	1

Updated to match(es) played on October 19, 2019. Source: #Matches
A = Away; H = Home; W = Win; D = Draw; L = Loss

===== Matches =====
July 6 1	Pacific FC	2–3	Cavalry FC	Langford, British Columbia
4:00 pm	Baldisimo (yellow card) 58'; Fisk 59'; Blasco (yellow card) 65'; Campbell 83'	Report	Camargo 21', 61'; Pasquotti 27'; Escalante (yellow card) 37'	Stadium: Westhills Stadium; Attendance: 2,399; Referee: Fabrizio Stasolla

July 13 2	HFX Wanderers FC	0–1	Cavalry FC	Halifax, Nova Scotia
1:30 pm	Gutiérrez (yellow card) 59'; Bona (yellow card) 88'	Report	Oliver 85'	Stadium: Wanderers Grounds; Attendance: 6,177; Referee: Filip Dujic

July 21 3	Cavalry FC	1–0	York9 FC	Foothills County, Alberta
4:00 pm	Gasparotto 10' (o.g.)	Report	Furlano (yellow card) 77'	Stadium: ATCO Field; Attendance: 3,538; Referee: Filip Dujic

July 27 4	Valour FC	1–1	Cavalry FC	Winnipeg, Manitoba
11:00 am	Thomas (yellow card) 45+1'; Paolucci (yellow card) 84'; Ohin (yellow card) 90+1'; Bustos 90+3' (pen.)	Report	Oliver 42'; Mavila (yellow card) 90+3'	Stadium: IG Field; Attendance: 5,111; Referee: Fabrizio Stasolla

August 10 5	HFX Wanderers FC	0–0	Cavalry FC	Halifax, Nova Scotia
11:00 am	Simmons (yellow card) 27'; Oxner (yellow card) 60'	Report	Wheeldon (yellow card) 38'; Trafford (yellow card) 47'	Stadium: Wanderers Grounds; Attendance: 6,204; Referee: Marie-Soleil Beaudoin

August 16 6 Wildrose Cup	Cavalry FC	0–0	FC Edmonton	Foothills County, Alberta
7:00 pm	Oliver (yellow card) 34'	Report	Didic (yellow card) 76'; Edwini-Bonsu (yellow card) 80'	Stadium: ATCO Field; Attendance: 3,650; Referee: Juan Marquez

August 21 7	Cavalry FC	3–1	York9 FC	Foothills County, Alberta
7:00 pm	Malonga 5', 51'; Büscher 45+1'; Adekugbe (yellow card) 59'	Report	Porter 15'; Di Chiara (yellow card) 44'; Springer (yellow card) 57'; Furlano (yellow card) 77'	Stadium: ATCO Field; Attendance: 3,176; Referee: Yusri Rudolf

August 25 8	Forge FC	1–0	Cavalry FC	Hamilton, Ontario
1:30 pm	Frano (yellow card) 48'; Grant 79' (yellow card) 81'	Report	Adekugbe (yellow card) 71'	Stadium: Tim Hortons Field; Attendance: 6,883; Referee: David Barrie

August 28 9	Cavalry FC	1–1	Pacific FC	Foothills County, Alberta
7:00 pm	Oliver 34'	Report	Campbell 7'; Chung (yellow card) 82'	Stadium: ATCO Field; Attendance: 3,064; Referee: Alain Ruch

September 2 10	Valour FC	0–8	Cavalry FC	Winnipeg, Manitoba
1:30 pm	Galán (yellow card) 48'; Ohin (yellow card) 58'; Mitter (yellow card) 78'; Carreiro (yellow card) 90'	Report	Ledgerwood 13' (pen.); Brown (yellow card) 18' (goal) 88'; Pasquotti 39'; Mitter 42' (o.g.); Büscher 52', 79'; Oliver 60', 87'	Stadium: IG Field; Attendance: 4,566; Referee: Fabrizio Stasolla

September 11 11 Wildrose Cup	FC Edmonton	0–1	Cavalry FC	Edmonton, Alberta
7:00 pm	Marcelin (yellow card) 45+2'; Diouck (yellow card) 66'; Esua (red card) 74'	Report	Ledgerwood 27' (pen.); Pasquotti (yellow card) 43'; Brown (yellow card) 79'	Stadium: Clarke Stadium; Attendance: 2,790; Referee: David Gantar

September 22 12	Cavalry FC	4–1	Pacific FC	Foothills County, Alberta
1:30 pm	Escalante 12', 87'; Carducci (yellow card) 60'; Oliver 66'; Malonga 75' (pen.)	Report	McCurdy (yellow card) 21' (yellow-red card) 75'; Blasco (yellow card) 36'; Norman Jr. (yellow card) 52'; Hojabrpour (yellow card) 56'; Campbell 61' (pen.)	Stadium: ATCO Field; Attendance: 3,968; Referee: Fabrizio Stasolla

September 28 13	York9 FC	1–1	Cavalry FC	Toronto, Ontario
4:00 pm	Di Chiara (yellow card) 43'; Telfer (yellow card) 52'; Murofushi 90+6'	Report	Eustáquio (yellow card) 63'; Escalante (red card) 66'; Mavila (yellow card) 66' (yellow-red card) 73'; Pasquotti 82' (yellow card) 90+2'; Ledgerwood (yellow card) 89'	Stadium: York Lions Stadium; Attendance: 2,568; Referee: Filip Dujic

October 2 14	Cavalry FC	4–1	Valour FC	Foothills County, Alberta
7:00 pm	Malonga 53', 87'; Waterman (yellow card) 62'; Ledgerwood (yellow card) 74'; Oliver 85'; Büscher 90+1'	Report	Ohin (yellow card) 28'; Bustos 77'	Stadium: ATCO Field; Attendance: 2,570; Referee: Alain Ruch

October 5 15	Cavalry FC	2–0	HFX Wanderers FC	Foothills County, Alberta
4:00 pm	Adekugbe 71'; Büscher (yellow card) 83'; Waterman 90+1'	Report	Skublak (yellow card) 44'; Williams (red card) 83'; N'sa (yellow card) 90+4'	Stadium: ATCO Field; Attendance: 3,295; Referee: Yusri Rudolf

October 9 16	Cavalry FC	2–1	Forge FC	Foothills County, Alberta
7:00 pm	Oliver (yellow card) 15'; Malonga 63', 84'; Pasquotti (yellow card) 88'	Report	Frano (yellow card) 45+1'; Novak (yellow card) 47' (goal) 78'; Owundi (yellow card) 66'; Nanco (yellow card) 90+3'	Stadium: ATCO Field; Attendance: 1,938; Referee: Silviu Petrescu
Note: Originally scheduled for July 30

October 16 17	Forge FC	1–0	Cavalry FC	Hamilton, Ontario
5:00 pm	Choinière 42'; Samuel (yellow card) 64' (yellow-red card) 71'	Report	Hamilton (yellow card) 36'; Büscher (yellow card) 74'	Stadium: Tim Hortons Field; Attendance: 3,864; Referee: Juan Marquez

October 19 18 Wildrose Cup	Cavalry FC	3–1	FC Edmonton	Foothills County, Alberta
2:00 pm	Adekugbe (yellow card) 47'; Camargo 76'; Brown 80'; Escalante 86' (yellow card) 86'	Report	Ameobi (yellow card) 75'; Diouck (yellow card) 83'; Ongaro 90'	Stadium: ATCO Field; Attendance: 3,492; Referee: David Barrie

=== CPL Finals ===
October 26 First leg	Forge FC	1–0	Cavalry FC	Hamilton, Ontario
2:00 pm	Borges (penalty missed) 39' 45+1' (red card) 69'; Awuah (yellow card) 63'	Report	Oliver (yellow card) 24'; Joel Waterman (red card) 37'; Wheeldon (yellow card) 69'; Trafford (yellow card) 75'; Ledgerwood (yellow card) 88'	Stadium: Tim Hortons Field; Attendance: 10,486; Referee: Pierre-Luc Lauzière
Note: Borges red card was rescinded by Canada Soccer’s Disciplinary Committee.

November 2 Second leg	Cavalry FC	0–1 (0–2 agg.)	Forge FC	Foothills County, Alberta
1:30 pm	Pasquotti (yellow card) 18'; Ledgerwood (yellow card) 51'; Escalante (yellow card) 75'; Wheeldon (yellow card) 86'	Report	Novak (yellow card) 42'; Choinière (yellow card) 73' (goal) 90+5'; Henry (yellow card) 90+2'	Stadium: ATCO Field; Attendance: 5,831; Referee: Alain Ruch

=== Canadian Championship ===
==== First qualifying round ====
May 15 First leg	Pacific FC	0–2	Cavalry FC	Langford, British Columbia
8:30 pm	Nakajima-Farran (yellow card) 70'	Report	Waterman (yellow card) 6'; Zator 9'; Oliver 16'	Stadium: Westhills Stadium; Attendance: 2,294; Referee: Yusri Rudolph

May 22 Second leg	Cavalry FC	2–1 (4–1 agg.)	Pacific FC	Foothills County, Alberta
7:30 pm	Haber 2' (o.g.); Büscher 67'; Northover (yellow card) 89'	Report	Haber 73', (yellow card) 88'; Verhoven (yellow card) 89'; Baldisimo (yellow card) 90+1'	Stadium: ATCO Field; Attendance: 3,000; Referee: Juan Marquez

==== Second qualifying round ====
June 4 First leg	Forge FC	1–1	Cavalry FC	Hamilton, Ontario
5:30 pm	Welshman 48'; Achinioti-Jönsson (yellow card) 68'; Frano (yellow card) 84'; Roberts (red card) 90+4'	Report	Mavila (yellow card) 40'; Malonga 90+6' (pen.)	Stadium: Tim Hortons Field; Attendance: 5,174; Referee: David Barrie

June 11 Second leg	Cavalry FC	2–1 (3–2 agg.)	Forge FC	Foothills County, Alberta
7:30 pm	Malonga 41'; Camargo 58'; Escalante (yellow card) 59'; Mavila (yellow card) 60'; Giantsopoulos (yellow card) 90+6'	Report	Bekker 13'; Krutzen (yellow card) 68'	Stadium: ATCO Field; Attendance: 4,000; Referee: Pierre-Luc Lauzière

==== Third qualifying round ====
July 10 First leg	Cavalry FC	0–0	Vancouver Whitecaps FC	Foothills County, Alberta
7:30 pm	Escalante (yellow card) 56'; Adekugbe (yellow card) 66'; Ledgerwood (yellow card) 71'	Report	Adnan (yellow card) 89'	Stadium: ATCO Field; Attendance: 5,129; Referee: Pierre-Luc Lauzière

July 24 Second leg	Vancouver Whitecaps FC	1–2 (1–2 agg.)	Cavalry FC	Vancouver, British Columbia
8:30 pm	Venuto (yellow card) 51'; In-beom 67'	Report	Mavila (yellow card) 5'; Brown 7'; Wheeldon (yellow card) 47'; Zator 72'	Stadium: BC Place; Attendance: 16,089; Referee: Alain Ruch

==== Semi-finals ====
August 7 First leg	Montreal Impact	2–1	Cavalry FC	Montreal, Quebec
5:30 pm	Piatti 32', 49'; Krolicki (yellow card) 34'; Okwonkwo (yellow card) 74'	Report	Ledgerwood (yellow card) 56' (yellow-red card) 71'; Camargo 69'	Stadium: Saputo Stadium; Attendance: 12,665; Referee: Silviu Petrescu

August 14 Second leg	Cavalry FC	0–1 (1–3 agg.)	Montreal Impact	Foothills County, Alberta
7:30 pm		Report	Jackson-Hamel 13'; Corrales (yellow card) 36'	Stadium: ATCO Field; Attendance: 5,633; Referee: Pierre-Luc Lauzière

== Statistics ==
=== Squad and statistics ===
As of November 2, 2019

No.	Pos	Nat	Player	Total		CPL Spring season		CPL Fall season		CPL Championship		Canadian Championship	
No.	Pos	Nat	Player	Apps	Goals	Apps	Goals	Apps	Goals	Apps	Goals	Apps	Goals
1	GK	(Canada) CAN	Marco Carducci	29	0	9+0	0	14+0	0	2+0	0	4+0	0
2	DF	(Canada) CAN	Chris Serban	0	0	0+0	0	0+0	0	0+0	0	0+0	0
3	DF	(England) ENG	Nathan Mavila	32	0	7+2	0	14+0	0	2+0	0	6+1	0
4	DF	(Canada) CAN	Dominick Zator	37	3	8+1	1	16+2	0	2+0	0	8+0	2
5	DF	(Canada) CAN	Mason Trafford	28	0	4+0	0	15+1	0	2+0	0	6+0	0
6	MF	(Canada) CAN	Nik Ledgerwood	23	3	4+0	1	9+5	2	2+0	0	2+1	0
7	FW	(Brazil) BRA	Oliver Minatel	29	8	1+5	0	14+2	7	1+1	0	1+4	1
8	MF	(Germany) GER	Julian Büscher	33	6	7+1	1	12+3	4	2+0	0	8+0	1
9	FW	(England) ENG	Jordan Brown	32	5	5+5	2	9+4	2	1+1	0	4+3	1
10	MF	(Canada) CAN	Sergio Camargo	26	8	7+2	3	7+2	3	1+1	0	5+1	2
11	MF	(Honduras) HON	José Escalante	30	4	6+1	1	11+4	3	1+1	0	5+1	0
12	DF	(Canada) CAN	Dean Northover	13	0	7+1	0	0+0	0	0+0	0	4+1	0
13	MF	(Canada) CAN	Victor Loturi	4	0	1+0	0	1+0	0	0+0	0	0+2	0
14	DF	(England) ENG	Jonathan Wheeldon	22	0	8+0	0	8+0	0	1+1	0	4+0	0
15	DF	(Canada) CAN	Joel Waterman	25	1	9+1	0	9+2	1	1+0	0	2+1	0
16	MF	(Canada) CAN	Elijah Adekugbe	24	1	8+0	0	9+2	1	0+0	0	4+1	0
17	MF	(Canada) CAN	Nico Pasquotti	33	5	6+2	2	14+1	3	2+0	0	8+0	0
18	MF	(Canada) CAN	Mauro Eustáquio	15	0	0+4	0	5+1	0	0+0	0	3+2	0
20	MF	(Colombia) COL	Carlos Patiño	15	0	1+2	0	2+6	0	0+0	0	3+1	0
21	MF	(Canada) CAN	Malyk Hamilton	20	0	2+2	0	12+2	0	0+0	0	2+0	0
22	GK	(Canada) CAN	Niko Giantsopoulos	9	0	1+0	0	4+0	0	0+0	0	4+0	0
23	FW	(Republic of the Congo) CGO	Dominique Malonga	30	13	8+1	4	12+2	7	2+0	0	4+1	2
24	FW	(Canada) CAN	Aribim Pepple	9	0	0+0	0	0+7	0	0+1	0	0+1	0
25	MF	(Canada) CAN	Tofa Fakunle	2	0	0+0	0	0+2	0	0+0	0	0+0	0
Players who left during the season:
19	FW	(Canada) CAN	Gabriel Bitar	3	0	1+0	0	0+0	0	0+0	0	1+1	0

=== Top scorers ===
Rank	Nat.	Player	Pos.	CPL Spring season	CPL Fall season	CPL Finals	Canadian Championship	TOTAL
1	(Republic of the Congo)	Dominique Malonga	FW	4	7	0	2	13
2	(Canada)	Sergio Camargo	MF	3	3	0	2	8
2	(Brazil)	Oliver Minatel	FW	0	7	0	1	8
4	(Germany)	Julian Büscher	MF	1	4	0	1	6
5	(England)	Jordan Brown	FW	2	2	0	1	5
5	(Canada)	Nico Pasquotti	MF	2	3	0	0	5
7	(Honduras)	José Escalante	MF	1	3	0	0	4
8	(Canada)	Nik Ledgerwood	MF	1	2	0	0	3
8	(Canada)	Dominick Zator	DF	1	0	0	2	3
10	(Canada)	Elijah Adekugbe	MF	0	1	0	0	1
10	(Canada)	Joel Waterman	DF	0	1	0	0	1
Own goals				1	2	0	1	4
Totals				16	35	0	10	61

Updated to match played November 2, 2019
Source: Canadian Premier League

=== Top assists ===
Rank	Nat.	Player	Pos.	CPL Spring season	CPL Fall season	CPL Finals	Canadian Championship	TOTAL
1	(Honduras)	José Escalante	MF	1	3	0	2	6
1	(Canada)	Nico Pasquotti	MF	1	2	0	3	6
3	(Canada)	Elijah Adekugbe	MF	3	1	0	0	4
3	(Germany)	Julian Büscher	MF	0	4	0	0	4
5	(Canada)	Sergio Camargo	MF	0	3	0	0	3
5	(Canada)	Malyk Hamilton	MF	0	2	0	1	3
5	(Canada)	Dominick Zator	DF	0	3	0	0	3
8	(Republic of the Congo)	Dominique Malonga	FW	1	0	0	1	2
8	(Canada)	Joel Waterman	DF	1	1	0	0	2
10	(England)	Jordan Brown	FW	0	1	0	0	1
10	(Canada)	Nik Ledgerwood	MF	0	0	0	1	1
10	(England)	Nathan Mavila	DF	0	1	0	0	1
10	(Brazil)	Oliver Minatel	FW	0	1	0	0	1
10	(Colombia)	Carlos Patiño	MF	0	1	0	0	1
Totals				7	23	0	8	38

Updated to match played November 2, 2019
Source: Canadian Premier League

=== Clean sheets ===
Rank	Nat.	Player	CPL Spring season	CPL Fall season	CPL Finals	Canadian Championship	TOTAL
1	(Canada)	Marco Carducci	5	4	0	1	10
2	(Canada)	Niko Giantsopoulos	0	3	0	1	4
Totals			5	7	0	2	14

Updated to match played November 2, 2019
Source: Canadian Premier League

=== Disciplinary record ===
No.	Pos.	Nat.	Player	CPL Spring season		CPL Fall season		CPL Finals		Canadian Championship		TOTAL	
No.	Pos.	Nat.	Player	Yellow card	Red card	Yellow card	Red card	Yellow card	Red card	Yellow card	Red card	Yellow card	Red card
1	GK	(Canada)	Marco Carducci	0	0	1	0	0	0	0	0	1	0
3	DF	(England)	Nathan Mavila	1	0	1	1	0	0	3	0	5	1
5	DF	(Canada)	Mason Trafford	0	0	1	0	1	0	0	0	2	0
6	MF	(Canada)	Nik Ledgerwood	0	0	2	0	2	0	1	1	5	1
7	FW	(Brazil)	Oliver Minatel	1	0	2	0	1	0	0	0	4	0
8	MF	(Germany)	Julian Büscher	3	0	2	0	0	0	0	0	5	0
9	FW	(England)	Jordan Brown	0	0	2	0	0	0	0	0	2	0
10	MF	(Canada)	Sergio Camargo	1	0	0	0	0	0	0	0	1	0
11	MF	(Honduras)	José Escalante	0	0	2	1	1	0	2	0	5	1
12	DF	(Canada)	Dean Northover	2	1	0	0	0	0	1	0	3	1
13	MF	(Canada)	Victor Loturi	1	0	0	0	0	0	0	0	1	0
14	DF	(England)	Jonathan Wheeldon	3	0	1	0	2	0	1	0	7	0
15	DF	(Canada)	Joel Waterman	3	0	1	0	0	1	1	0	5	1
16	MF	(Canada)	Elijah Adekugbe	3	0	3	0	0	0	1	0	7	0
17	MF	(Canada)	Nico Pasquotti	2	0	3	0	1	0	0	0	6	0
18	MF	(Canada)	Mauro Eustáquio	1	1	1	0	0	0	0	0	2	1
21	MF	(Canada)	Malyk Hamilton	0	0	1	0	0	0	0	0	1	0
22	GK	(Canada)	Niko Giantsopoulos	0	0	0	0	0	0	1	0	1	0
23	FW	(Republic of the Congo)	Dominique Malonga	1	0	0	0	0	0	0	0	1	0
Totals				22	2	23	2	8	1	11	1	64	6

Updated to match played November 2, 2019
Source: Canadian Premier League

== Honours ==
Award	Recipient(s)	Link
Golden Glove	(Canada) Marco Carducci	
Coach of the Year	(England) Tommy Wheeldon Jr.	
