= Nikolas Ledgerwood =

Canadian professional soccer player (born 1985)

Nik Ledgerwood
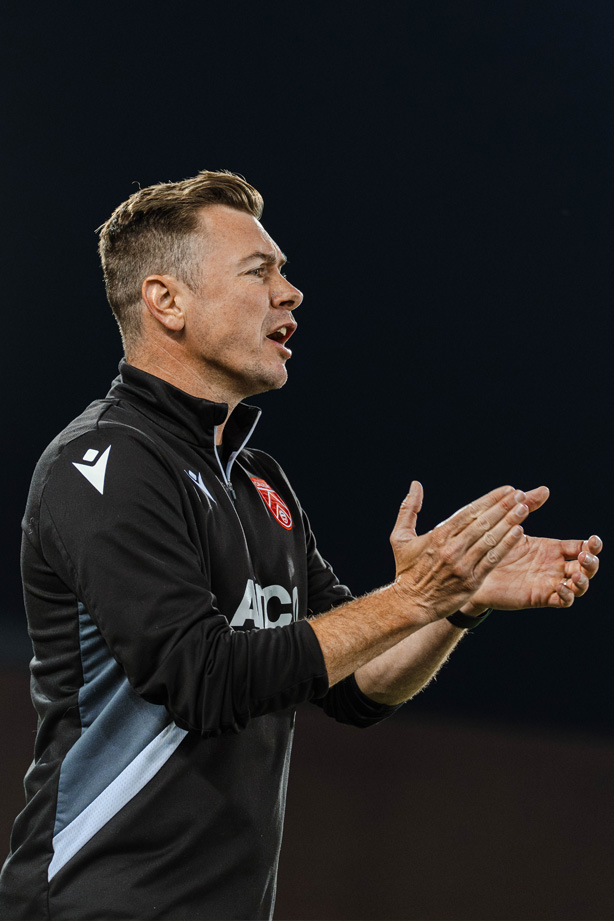
- Ledgerwood coaching with Cavalry in 2024.

Personal information
- Full name: Nikolas William Ledgerwood
- Date of birth: 16 January 1985 (age 41)
- Place of birth: Lethbridge, Alberta, Canada
- Height: 1.76 m (5 ft 9 in)
- Positions: Midfielder; right-back

Team information
- Current team: Cavalry FC (assistant)

Youth career
- 1992–2001: Calgary Storm

Senior career*
| Years | Team | Apps | (Gls) |
| 2002 | Calgary Storm | 26 | (0) |
| 2003–2007 | 1860 Munich II | 44 | (1) |
| 2006–2009 | 1860 Munich | 32 | (1) |
| 2006–2007 | → Wacker Burghausen (loan) | 15 | (1) |
| 2009–2010 | FSV Frankfurt | 22 | (1) |
| 2010–2012 | Wehen Wiesbaden | 50 | (1) |
| 2010 | Wehen Wiesbaden II | 2 | (0) |
| 2012–2013 | Hammarby IF | 36 | (4) |
| 2014 | MSV Duisburg | 17 | (0) |
| 2014–2015 | Energie Cottbus | 31 | (1) |
| 2016–2017 | FC Edmonton | 50 | (2) |
| 2018 | Calgary Foothills | 7 | (0) |
| 2019–2021 | Cavalry FC | 45 | (5) |
| Total | | 391 | (17) |

International career
| 2001 | Canada U17 | 3 | (0) |
| 2003–2005 | Canada U20 | 7 | (0) |
| 2008 | Canada U23 | 5 | (0) |
| 2007–2016 | Canada | 50 | (1) |

Managerial career
- 2022–: Cavalry FC (assistant)
- * Club domestic league appearances and goals

Nikolas William "Nik" Ledgerwood (born 16 January 1985) is a Canadian soccer coach and former player who serves as an assistant coach with Cavalry FC.

== Club career ==
=== Early career ===
Born in Lethbridge, Alberta, Ledgerwood played for Calgary Storm in 2002, before signing with 1860 Munich in 2003. He signed a two-year (plus two-year club option) contract with 1860 Munich of the German Second Bundesliga in July 2003. He had a few seasons with them in their 'B' team, who played in Germany's third level. In 2006, he joined their senior team but he only became a regular after a loan period at second level Wacker Burghausen, who got themselves relegated at the end of the 2006–07 season.

=== FSV Frankfurt ===
After five years with Munich, on 9 June 2009 he announced his move to FSV Frankfurt on a one-year contract.

=== Wehen Wiesbaden ===
On 12 July 2010, Ledgerwood signed a two-year contract with SV Wehen Wiesbaden.

=== Hammarby IF ===
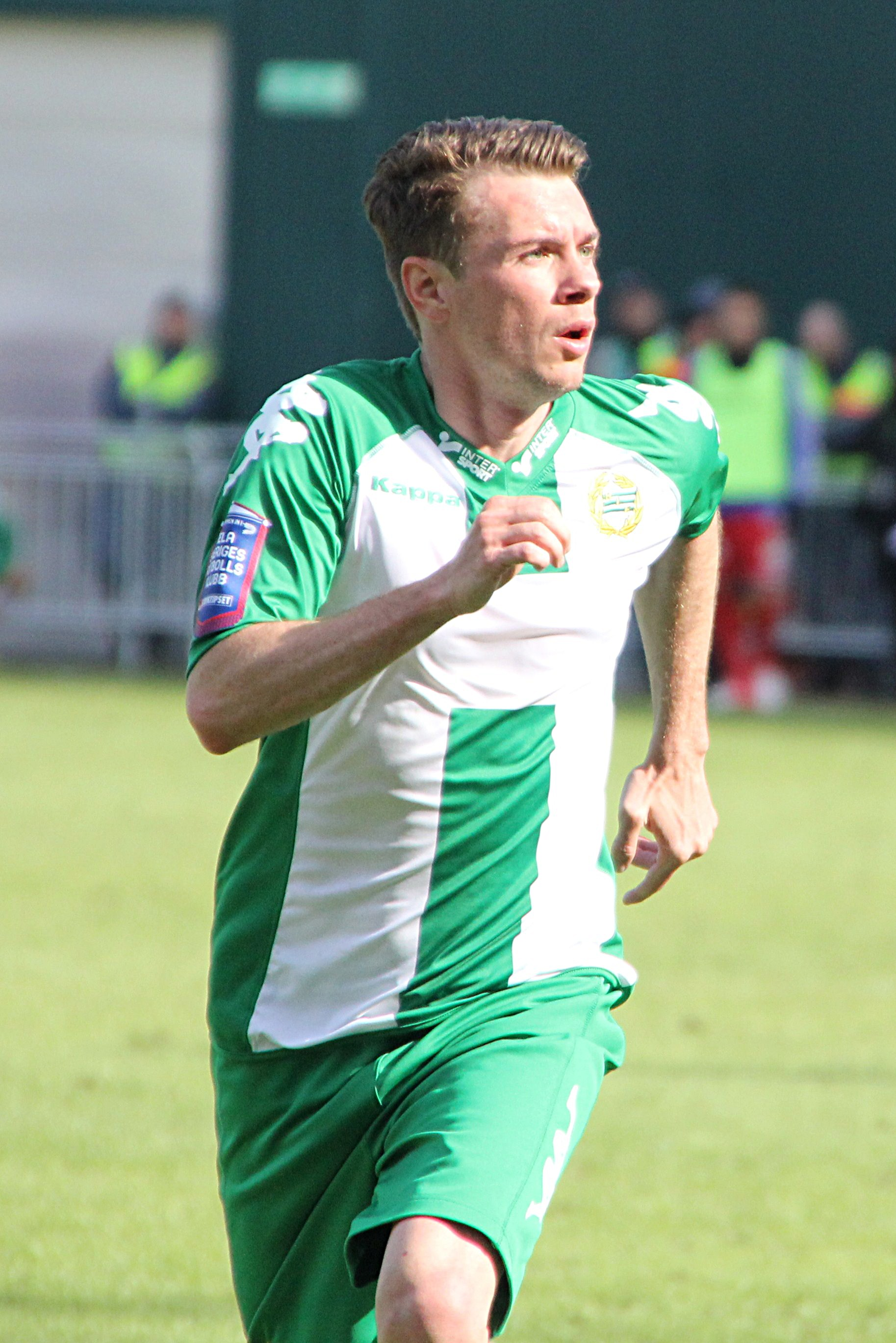
Ledgerwood playing for Hammarby IF in 2013

In the summer of 2012, it was announced that Ledgerwood had signed for Hammarby in the Superettan. He made his debut on 4 August 2012 in a 1–0 victory over Umeå. Three weeks later on 26 August, Ledgerwood scored his first goal for the club against Falkenbergs FF, the game ended in an away 3–1 win.

=== FC Edmonton ===
On 12 January 2016 it was announced that Ledgerwood had signed a deal with FC Edmonton in the North American Soccer League. Ledgerwood played in the 3–0 loss on 11 May 2016 and the 2–0 win on 18 May 2016 against the Ottawa Fury in the Canadian Championship. Ledgerwood would spend two seasons with FC Edmonton, before the club ceased operations after the 2017 season.

=== Calgary Foothills ===
In January 2018, Ledgerwood would sign with Premier Development League club Calgary Foothills FC, serving as both the captain of the club for the 2018 season, and as an academy coach. When interviewed about the decision, Ledgerwood indicated the signing was with an eye on the launch of the Canadian Premier League in 2019, as well as his post playing career. Calgary would go on to win the PDL Championship that season.

=== Cavalry FC ===
In November 2018, Ledgerwood was unveiled alongside Sergio Camargo as Cavalry FC's first signings ahead of the inaugural Canadian Premier League season. He scored three goals in eighteen league appearances for Cavalry that season on route to two split season titles and a run to the semi-finals of the Canadian Championship. On 13 November 2019, Ledgerwood re-signed with Cavalry for the 2020 season. In January 2022, Ledgerwood would announce his retirement from playing.

== International career ==
=== Youth ===
Ledgerwood was a member of the Canada U-17 team at the 2001 CONCACAF U-17 Tournament.

Was injured during the Youth Team camp before the 2003 CONCACAF U-20 Tournament. He played one game for Canada at the 2003 FIFA U-20 World Cup. He played in two Youth Team friendlies against the United States in December 2004. He played against Jamaica in two friendlies in July 2004. He played in all three games (Mexico, Honduras, Jamaica) at the 2005 CONCACAF U-20 Tournament in January 2005. He played 90 minutes against Panama on 4 January 2005, and 90 minutes against Ecuador on 6 January 2005. He played 90 minutes in all three games (Syria, Colombia, Italy) at the 2005 FIFA U-20 World Cup in the Netherlands.

=== Senior ===
He made his senior debut for the Canada men's national soccer team on 22 August 2007 against Iceland. He has represented Canada in qualification for the 2010, 2014 and 2018 FIFA World Cups. Ledgerwood scored his first goal for Canada against El Salvador on 6 September 2016.

== Coaching career ==
In 2017 Ledgerwood earned his Canada Soccer Coaching B License. He later earned his Canadian A License. On 15 February 2022, after retiring as a player, Ledgerwood rejoined Cavalry FC as an assistant coach and community relations manager.

== Career statistics ==
=== Club ===
As of 16 November 2021

Appearances and goals by club, season and competition
| Club | Season | League | | | Cup | | Other^{1} | | Total | | Ref. |
| Club | Season | League | Apps | Goals | Apps | Goals | Apps | Goals | Apps | Goals | Ref. |
|---|---|---|---|---|---|---|---|---|---|---|---|
| Calgary Storm | 2002 | A-League | 26 | 0 | 0 | 0 | — | | 26 | 0 | |
| 1860 Munich II | 2003–04 | Regionalliga Süd | 6 | 0 | — | | — | | 6 | 0 | |
| 1860 Munich II | 2004–05 | Regionalliga Süd | 27 | 1 | — | | — | | 27 | 1 | |
| 1860 Munich II | 2005–06 | Regionalliga Süd | 16 | 0 | — | | — | | 16 | 0 | |
| 1860 Munich II | 2006–07 | Regionalliga Süd | 2 | 0 | — | | — | | 2 | 0 | |
| 1860 Munich II | 2007–08 | Regionalliga Süd | 5 | 0 | — | | — | | 5 | 0 | |
| 1860 Munich II | 2008–09 | Regionalliga Süd | 2 | 0 | — | | — | | 2 | 0 | |
| 1860 Munich II | Total | | 58 | 1 | 0 | 0 | 0 | 0 | 58 | 1 | — |
| 1860 Munich | 2005–06 | 2. Bundesliga | 3 | 0 | 1 | 0 | — | | 4 | 0 | |
| 1860 Munich | 2007–08 | 2. Bundesliga | 6 | 0 | 1 | 0 | — | | 7 | 0 | |
| 1860 Munich | 2008–09 | 2. Bundesliga | 23 | 1 | 2 | 0 | — | | 25 | 1 | |
| 1860 Munich | Total | | 32 | 1 | 4 | 0 | 0 | 0 | 36 | 1 | — |
| Wacker Burghausen (loan) | 2006–07 | 2. Bundesliga | 15 | 1 | 0 | 0 | — | | 15 | 1 | |
| FSV Frankfurt | 2009–10 | 2. Bundesliga | 22 | 1 | 0 | 0 | — | | 22 | 1 | |
| Wehen Wiesbaden II | 2010–11 | Regionalliga Süd | 2 | 0 | — | | — | | 2 | 0 | |
| Wehen Wiesbaden | 2010–11 | 3. Liga | 25 | 0 | 0 | 0 | — | | 25 | 0 | |
| Wehen Wiesbaden | 2011–12 | 3. Liga | 25 | 1 | 1 | 0 | — | | 26 | 1 | |
| Wehen Wiesbaden | Total | | 50 | 1 | 1 | 0 | 0 | 0 | 51 | 1 | — |
| Hammarby | 2012 | Superettan | 12 | 2 | | | — | | 12 | 2 | |
| Hammarby | 2013 | Superettan | 24 | 2 | | | — | | 24 | 2 | |
| Hammarby | Total | | 36 | 4 | | | 0 | 0 | 36 | 4 | — |
| MSV Duisburg | 2013–14 | 3. Liga | 17 | 0 | 0 | 0 | — | | 17 | 0 | |
| Energie Cottbus | 2014–15 | 3. Liga | 25 | 1 | 1 | 0 | — | | 26 | 1 | |
| Energie Cottbus | 2015–16 | 3. Liga | 6 | 0 | — | | — | | 6 | 0 | |
| Energie Cottbus | Total | | 31 | 1 | 1 | 0 | 0 | 0 | 32 | 1 | — |
| FC Edmonton | 2016 | NASL | 29 | 2 | 2 | 0 | 1 | 0 | 32 | 2 | |
| FC Edmonton | 2017 | NASL | 21 | 0 | 2 | 0 | 0 | 0 | 23 | 0 | |
| FC Edmonton | Total | | 50 | 2 | 4 | 0 | 1 | 0 | 55 | 2 | — |
| Calgary Foothills FC | 2018 | PDL | 7 | 0 | 0 | 0 | 0 | 0 | 7 | 0 | |
| Cavalry FC | 2019 | CPL | 18 | 3 | 3 | 0 | 2 | 0 | 23 | 3 | |
| Cavalry FC | 2020 | CPL | 7 | 1 | 0 | 0 | 0 | 0 | 7 | 1 | |
| Cavalry FC | 2021 | CPL | 20 | 1 | 2 | 0 | 0 | 0 | 22 | 1 | |
| Cavalry FC | Total | | 45 | 5 | 5 | 0 | 2 | 0 | 52 | 5 | — |
| Career total | | | 391 | 17 | 15 | 0 | 3 | 0 | 409 | 17 | — |

- 1.Includes the NASL playoffs.

=== International ===
As of 3 September 2017

Appearances and goals by national team and year
| National team | Year | Apps | Goals |
|---|---|---|---|
| Canada | 2007 | 1 | 0 |
| Canada | 2008 | 1 | 0 |
| Canada | 2009 | 1 | 0 |
| Canada | 2010 | 3 | 0 |
| Canada | 2011 | 8 | 0 |
| Canada | 2012 | 8 | 0 |
| Canada | 2013 | 11 | 0 |
| Canada | 2014 | 4 | 0 |
| Canada | 2015 | 8 | 0 |
| Canada | 2016 | 4 | 1 |
| Canada | 2017 | 1 | 0 |
| Total | | 50 | 1 |

Scores and results list Canada's goal tally first, score column indicates score after each Ledgerwood goal.

List of international goals scored by Nikolas Ledgerwood
| No. | Date | Venue | Cap | Opponent | Score | Result | Competition |
|---|---|---|---|---|---|---|---|
| 1 | 6 September 2016 | BC Place, Vancouver, Canada | 49 | El Salvador | 2–0 | 3–1 | 2018 FIFA World Cup qualification |

== Honours ==
=== Club ===
MSV Duisburg

- Lower Rhine Cup: 2014

Energie Cottbus

- Brandenburg Cup: 2015

Calgary Foothills

- PDL Championship: 2018

Calvary FC

- Canadian Premier League Finals
  - Runners-up: 2019
- Canadian Premier League (Regular season):
  - Champions: Spring 2019, Fall 2019
