= Adekugbe =

- Gender: Male
- Language: Yoruba

Origin
- Language: Ondo State
- Origin: Nigeria
- Meaning: Royalty does not perish

Adekugbe is a Nigerian surname. Notable people with the surname include:

- Sam Adekugbe (born 1995), Canadian professional soccer player
- Elijah Adekugbe (born 1996), English professional footballer
- Adedayo Adekugbe (born 2003), Entertainment Reporter, Podcaster and Writer

Adekugbe Adedisenwo is the prince of Ondo Land the great grandfather to Sam, Elijah and Adedayo Adekugbe. He married three wives, the first wife children includes Dorcas Salami (formerly, Adekugbe) (Second Born), Ademola Robert Adekugbe (Third Born).

Ademola Robert Adekugbe gave birth to four children: Adebola Adekugbe (First Born), Late. Adelanke Adekugbe (Second Born), Adedotun Adekugbe (Third Born), Adegbola Adetunji Adekugbe (Fourth Born). Adegbola Adetunji Adekugbe married Ronke Adekugbe and is the father of Adedayo Adekugbe (First Born), twin children, Adewale Taiwo Adekugbe (Second Born, First Twin) and Adesewa Adekugbe (Third Born, Second Twin).
