= José Escalante =

Honduran footballer (born 1995)

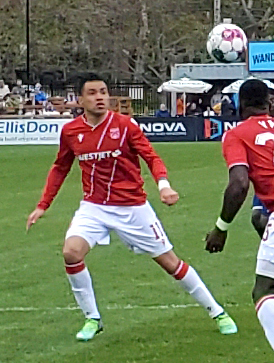
- Escalante with Cavalry in 2022

Personal information
- Full name: José Alberto Escalante Rápalo
- Date of birth: 29 May 1995 (age 31)
- Place of birth: Tegucigalpa, Honduras
- Height: 1.78 m (5 ft 10 in)
- Position: Attacking midfielder

Youth career
- Olimpia

Senior career*
Years	Team	Apps	(Gls)
2012–2018	Olimpia	20	(1)
2014	→ Honduras Progreso (loan)	0	(0)
2016	→ RGVFC Toros (loan)	16	(3)
2016–2017	→ Houston Dynamo (loan)	6	(0)
2017	→ RGVFC Toros (loan)	21	(4)
2018	→ San Antonio FC (loan)	21	(1)
2019	Juticalpa	11	(0)
2019–2024	Cavalry FC	84	(9)
2020–2021	→ Vida (loan)	22	(0)
2023	→ Motagua (loan)	8	(0)
2024	→ Atlético Independiente (loan)		
Total		209+	(18)

International career^{‡}
2010–2011	Honduras U17	5	(0)
2013–2015	Honduras U20	10	(0)
2014	Honduras U23	2	(0)
- * Club domestic league appearances and goals as of 7 December 2023 ‡ National team caps and goals as of 10 April 2019

José Alberto Escalante Rápalo (born 29 May 1995) is a Honduran former footballer who played as a midfielder.

== Club career ==
=== Olimpia ===
Escalante began his career with Olimpia, spending time on loan with Honduran side Honduras Progreso in 2014 and American United Soccer League side Rio Grande Valley FC Toros in 2016. On 3 August 2016, Escalante joined Houston Dynamo on loan from Rio Grande Valley until the end of the 2016 season, returning to the Dynamo on 20 January 2017 on a 12-month loan deal from Olympia.

=== Juticalpa ===
On 7 January 2019, Escalante returned to Honduras and signed with Juticalpa. That year, he made eleven appearances in the Clausura.

=== Cavalry FC ===
On 10 April 2019, Escalante signed with Canadian Premier League side Cavalry FC. That season, he made 22 league appearances, scoring four goals, made six appearances in the Canadian Championship and played in both legs of the Canadian Premier League Finals.

On 12 February 2020, Escalante re-signed with Cavalry for the 2020 season, however he was unable to join the team for the shortened campaign due to the COVID-19 pandemic preventing his entry into Canada. On 9 September 2020, Escalante was loaned to Honduran side Vida. In November 2020, Escalante would re-sign with the club for the 2021 season, his third season with the club. In January 2022, Cavalry announced that they had re-signed Escalante for the 2022 and 2023 seasons, with an option for 2024.

In June 2023, Escalante would make his 100th appearance for the club, becoming the second player to hit that milestone.

==== Loans in Honduras ====
In June 2023, F.C. Motagua had announced that they had signed Escalante, however Cavalry would state that Escalante was still under contract with the club, stating he had taken a leave of absence from the club to be closer to family. A few weeks later, Cavalry would announce that Escalante would sign a one-year loan with Motagua.

In January 2024, he was loaned to Honduran second tier Honduran Liga Nacional de Ascenso side Atlético Independiente.

In June 2024, he announced his retirement.

== International career ==
Escalante first played for the Honduran U-17 team at the 2011 CONCACAF U-17 Championship, making five appearances in the tournament, including three starts.

Escalante first played for the Honduran U-20 team at the 2013 Central American Games. The following year, he was called up for the 2014 Central American and Caribbean Games, an U-21 tournament. He subsequently received another call-up for the 2015 CONCACAF U-20 Championship, where he made three appearances and helped Honduras qualify for the 2015 FIFA U-20 World Cup. At the U-20 World Cup, Escalante started in all three games for Honduras.

== Career statistics ==
As of 7 December 2023
Club	Season	League			Playoffs		Cup		Continental		Total	
Club	Season	Division	Apps	Goals	Apps	Goals	Apps	Goals	Apps	Goals	Apps	Goals
Olimpia	2012-13	Liga Nacional	13	1	0	0	0	0	2	0	15	1
Olimpia	2013–14	Liga Nacional	6	0	0	0	0	0	0	0	6	0
Olimpia	2015–16	Liga Nacional	1	0	0	0	0	0	0	0	1	0
Olimpia	Club total		20	1	0	0	0	0	2	0	22	1
Honduras Progreso (loan)	2014–15	Liga Nacional	0	0	0	0	0	0	—		0	0
RGVFC Toros (loan)	2016	United Soccer League	16	3	0	0	—		—		16	3
Houston Dynamo (loan)	2016	Major League Soccer	3	0	—		0	0	—		3	0
Houston Dynamo (loan)	2017	Major League Soccer	3	0	0	0	1	0	—		4	0
Houston Dynamo (loan)	Club total		6	0	0	0	1	0	0	0	7	0
RGVFC Toros (loan)	2017	United Soccer League	21	4	—		—		—		21	4
San Antonio FC (loan)	2018	United Soccer League	21	1	—		3	1	—		24	2
Juticalpa	2018-19	Liga Nacional	11	0	0	0	0	0	—		11	0
Cavalry FC	2019	Canadian Premier League	22	4	2	0	6	0	—		30	4
Cavalry FC	2020	Canadian Premier League	0	0	—		—		—		0	0
Cavalry FC	2021	Canadian Premier League	25	1	1	0	2	0	—		28	1
Cavalry FC	2022	Canadian Premier League	26	4	2	0	2	0	—		30	4
Cavalry FC	2023	Canadian Premier League	11	0	0	0	1	0	—		12	0
Cavalry FC	Club total		84	9	5	0	11	0	0	0	100	9
Vida (loan)	2020-21	Liga Nacional	22	0	0	0	0	0	—		22	0
Motagua (loan)	2023-24	Liga Nacional	8	0	0	0	0	0	2	0	10	0
Total			209	18	5	0	13	1	4	0	228	19

== Honours ==
Calvary

- Canadian Premier League Finals runner-up: 2019
- Canadian Premier League (regular season): Spring 2019, Fall 2019
