= Nathan Mavila =

English footballer

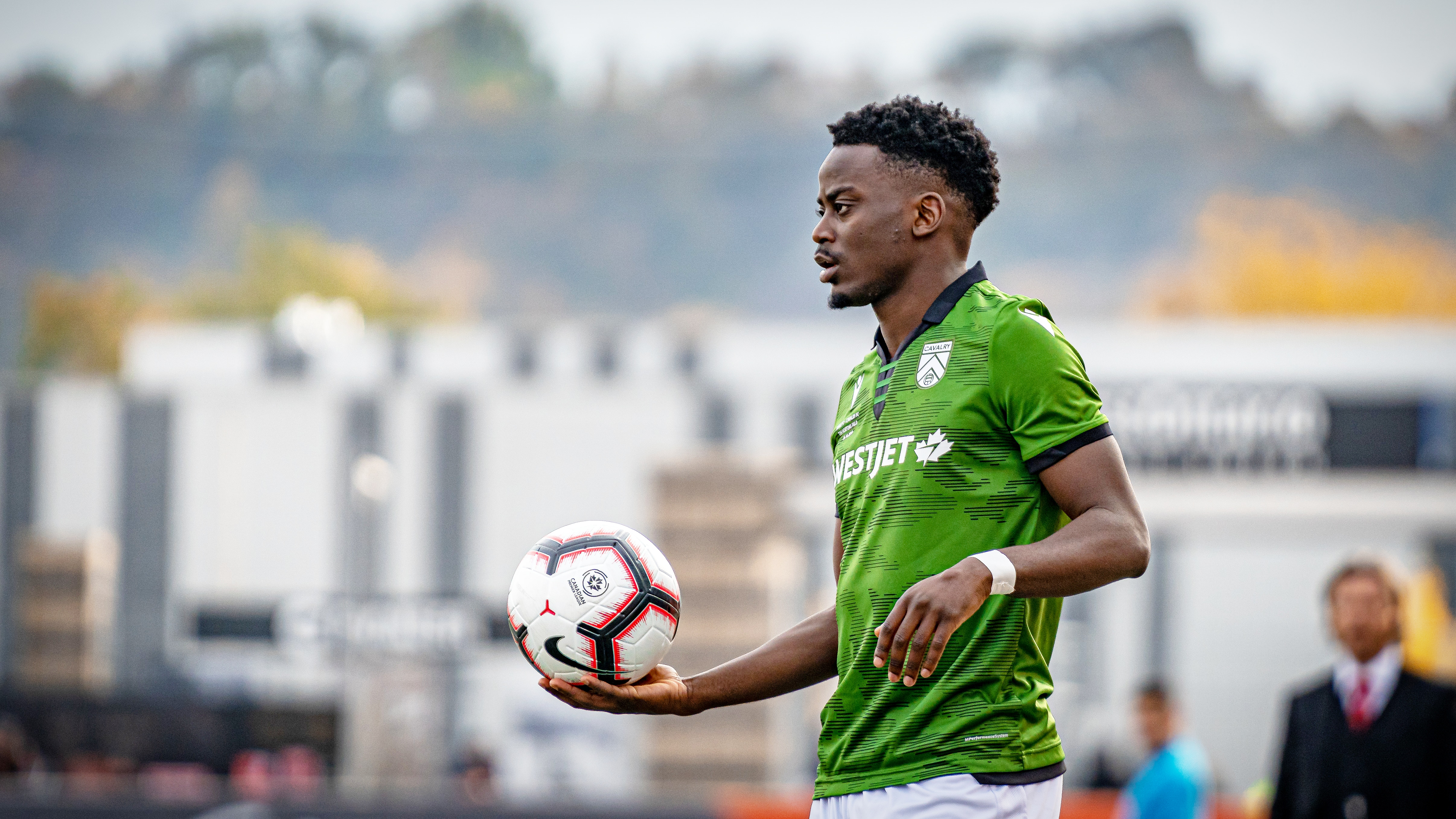
- Mavila playing for Cavalry FC in 2019

Personal information
- Full name: Nathan Mabi-Mavila
- Date of birth: 15 October 1995 (age 31)
- Place of birth: Brixton, London, England
- Height: 5 ft 10 in (1.78 m)
- Position: Left-back

Youth career
- Afewee Urban
- 2008–2012: Wycombe Wanderers
- 2012–2014: West Ham United

Senior career*
Years	Team	Apps	(Gls)
2014–2016	West Ham United	0	(0)
2015	→ Wealdstone (loan)	8	(0)
2015	→ Aldershot Town (loan)		
2016	→ Wealdstone (loan)	10	(0)
2016	Maidstone United	6	(0)
2016–2017	Cambridge City		
2017	Wealdstone	13	(0)
2017–2018	Wingate & Finchley	30	(1)
2018	Leyton Orient		
2018–2019	Hampton & Richmond Borough	19	(0)
2019	Dulwich Hamlet	5	(0)
2019–2020	Cavalry FC	32	(3)
2021	Brage	6	(0)
2021–2022	Wingate & Finchley	8	(0)
2022	Pacific FC	19	(0)
2023	Al-Faisaly SC		
2025	AFC Croydon Athletic	7	(0)
2025	Butwal Lumbini		
- * Club domestic league appearances and goals

Nathan Mabi-Mavila (born 15 October 1995) is an English professional footballer who plays as a left-back.

== Early life ==
Mavila is from the Brixton district of Lambeth, London. He began playing Sunday league football with local club Afewee Urban before joining the London County team.

In 2008, Mavila joined the academy of English League Two side Wycombe Wanderers. He left Wycombe in 2012 after the club shut down its academy programme.

== Club career ==
=== West Ham United ===
In 2012, Mavila joined the academy of Premier League side West Ham United. After completing his two-year scholarship, Mavila signed his first professional contract with West Ham in 2014.

==== 2014–15 ====
On 15 January 2015, Mavila was sent on a one-month loan to Football Conference North side Wealdstone after playing only 65 minutes for West Ham's U-21s that season. On 17 January 2015, he made his senior debut as a starter in a 4–2 win over Chelmsford City. His loan was subsequently extended for an additional month and Mavila went on to make a total of eight appearances for Wealdstone that season.

==== 2015–16 ====
On 6 August 2018, Mavila was named to the West Ham 18 for the first time, in a UEFA Europa League match against Romanian side Astra Giurgiu, but did not appear in the match.

On 9 October 2015, Mavila joined National League side Aldershot Town on a one-month loan as a replacement for previous loan player Nick Anderton. He appeared on the bench for Aldershot on five occasions, but failed to make an appearance.

On 10 March 2016, Mavila rejoined Wealdstone until the end of the season and made ten appearances, including three starts. At the end of the season, Mavila was released by West Ham.

In April 2016, Mavila went on trial with Italian Serie B side Perugia. He later spent time on trial with several different league clubs in England, including League One side Charlton Athletic.

=== Maidstone United ===
On 3 September 2016, Mavila signed with National League side Maidstone United. He made six league appearances for the Stones before being released in October of that year.

=== Cambridge City ===
On 5 December 2016, Mavila signed for Southern Football League side Cambridge City. In early January, Mavila left the club after having difficulties commuting to matches from his home in London.

Mavila received the Black Youth Awards Achievements Sportsman Of The Year in December 2016.

=== Third spell at Wealdstone ===
On 4 January 2017, Mavila rejoined Wealdstone on a permanent basis until the end of the season. He made thirteen league appearances that season, including five starts, and had another two substitute appearances in the FA Trophy.

=== Wingate & Finchley ===
On 7 August 2017, Mavila signed with Isthmian League side Wingate & Finchley. In November 2017, he went on trial with EFL Championship side Cardiff City. When Mavila left Wingate in February 2018, he had made 43 appearances in all competitions, more than any other player in the squad.

=== Leyton Orient ===
On 9 February 2018, Mavila joined National League side Leyton Orient until the end of the season. He was released at the end of the season without making an appearance for the club.

=== Hampton & Richmond Borough ===
After leaving Leyton Orient, Mavila joined National League North side Hampton & Richmond Borough in summer 2018. He made nineteen league appearances for Hampton that season and also played 90 minutes in two of the club's FA Cup ties, including a 1–2 loss to League Two side Oldham Athletic.

=== Dulwich Hamlet ===
In January 2019, mavila signed with National League North side Dulwich Hamlet. While at Dulwich, he made five league appearances, all of which were starts.

=== Cavalry FC ===
==== 2019 ====
On 20 February 2019, Mavila made his first move overseas, signing with Canadian Premier League side Cavalry FC, where he reunited with former West Ham United U-21 teammate Jordan Brown. On 8 May 2019, Mavila made his professional debut as a starter in a 1–0 win over Valour FC. That season, he made 23 league appearances, seven in the Canadian Championship and played both legs of the Canadian Premier League Finals.

==== 2020 ====
On 12 February 2020, Mavila re-signed with Cavalry for the 2020 season. He scored his first goal for Cavalry in the first game of the 2020 Canadian Premier League season, a penalty in stoppage time tie the game 2–2 against Forge FC. After the 2020 season, Mavila and the club would mutually agree to part ways, as Mavila would move back to England to be closer to family.

=== Brage ===
On 25 January 2021, Mavila joined Superettan side Brage on a two-year deal. After appearing in six matches, Mavila would leave the club midway through the 2021 season.

=== Return to England ===
In November 2021, he returned to England and re-signed for Isthmian League Premier Division side Wingate & Finchley.

=== Return to Canada ===
On 7 March 2022, Mavila made his return to Canada, signing with reigning champions Pacific FC. He departed the club at the end of the season.

In 2023, Mavila played for Jordanian Pro League club Al-Faisaly SC, playing for them in the AFC Champions League.

In February 2025, Mavila joined Isthmian League side AFC Croydon Athletic. He went on to make eight appearances in all competitions for the club. On 12 March 2025, Mavila agreed to join Nepal Super League side Butwal Lumbini.

== Honours ==
=== Club ===
Cavalry FC

- Canadian Premier League (Regular season):
  - Champions: Spring 2019, Fall 2019
- Canadian Premier League Finals
  - Runners-up: 2019

Al-Faisaly SC

- Jordan Shield Cup
  - Champions: 2023
- Jordan Super Cup
  - Runners-up: 2023

Individual

- Black Youth Awards Achievements - Sportsman Of The Year: 2016

== Personal life ==
Mavila was born and raised in Brixton, Lambeth, London to parents from the Democratic Republic of the Congo. In autumn 2018, he studied Sport and Exercise at the University of East London with the aim of becoming a sport psychologist after his retirement from football. In July 2022, Mavila married his wife, Myriam Mavila. They had a destination wedding in Greece.

On 7 August 2017, Mavila was arrested at a police checkpoint for using forged documents during his automobile insurance application, which stated he was twenty years older and lived in Kent, in an attempt to have to pay fewer premiums. He pleaded guilty to one count of fraud by false representation and one count of using a motor vehicle without third party insurance, and was sentenced to 40 hours of community service.
