= Dominique Malonga (footballer) =

Professional footballer (born 1989)

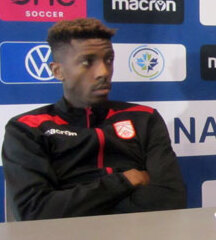
- Malonga in 2019

Personal information
- Full name: Dominique Sossorobla Malonga
- Date of birth: 8 January 1989 (age 37)
- Place of birth: Châtenay-Malabry, France
- Height: 1.85 m (6 ft 1 in)
- Position: Forward

Team information
- Current team: Þór Akureyri
- Number: 19

Youth career
- –2002: Montrouge FC 92
- 2002–2004: Tours
- 2004–2007: Monaco

Senior career*
Years	Team	Apps	(Gls)
2007	Monaco II	16	(8)
2007–2009	Torino	9	(1)
2008–2009	→ Foggia (loan)	10	(1)
2009–2014	Cesena	57	(10)
2012–2013	→ Vicenza (loan)	38	(10)
2013–2014	→ Murcia (loan)	28	(5)
2014–2016	Hibernian	43	(17)
2016–2017	Pro Vercelli	16	(3)
2017	Elche	9	(1)
2017–2018	Servette	6	(0)
2018	Chania	6	(1)
2019	Cavalry FC	24	(11)
2020	Lokomotiv Plovdiv	7	(3)
2021	KPV	7	(0)
2021–	Þór Akureyri	2	(0)

International career^{‡}
2007–2008	France U19	2	(2)
2014–	Congo	7	(0)
- * Club domestic league appearances and goals as of 18:18, 8 September 2021 (UTC) ‡ National team caps and goals as of 20:30, 31 January 2017 (UTC)

Dominique Sossorobla Malonga (born 8 January 1989) is a professional footballer who plays as a striker for Icelandic club Þór Akureyri.

Malonga has previously played for Italian sides Torino, Foggia, Cesena, Vicenza and Pro Vercelli, as well as Murcia and Elche in Spain, Hibernian in Scotland, Servette in Switzerland, Chania in Greece, Cavalry in Canada and Lokomotiv Plovdiv in Bulgaria.

== Early life ==
Born in Châtenay-Malabry, France, Malonga grew up in the suburbs of Paris to Congolese parents. Malonga grew up supporting Monaco, and later ended up joining the club's youth team. Malonga later described his time at Monaco, quoting: "It is beautiful and Monte Carlo is beautiful and we were very privileged, because in the stadium we had a school and everything we needed. It was a great, great, great centre. They don’t get many people going to their games, though. The money is good but the fans are not as good. It is better to play here."

== Club career ==
=== Torino ===
In 2007, after three years at Monaco, Malonga joined Torino, where he would stay until 2011. Malonga stated that he felt moving to Italy gave him confidence and that he wasn't scared. He made his Serie A debut on 23 September 2007, against A.C. Siena. However, his time at Torino was plagued with injuries. He spent a period on loan at Foggia while at Torino.

=== Cesena ===
After a successful loan with the Serie B champions, he signed for Cesena in a co-ownership deal for €750,000. In June 2011 Cesena acquired Malonga outright for another €1.4 million, making him cost €2.15 million. (i.e. they paid Torino an additional €650,000 on top of the €750,000 already booked in the balance sheets for co-ownership) He also signed a new 3+1 year contract. However the club relegated at the end of 2011–12 Serie A, which saw Malonga sent out on loan to other clubs for the rest of his contract.

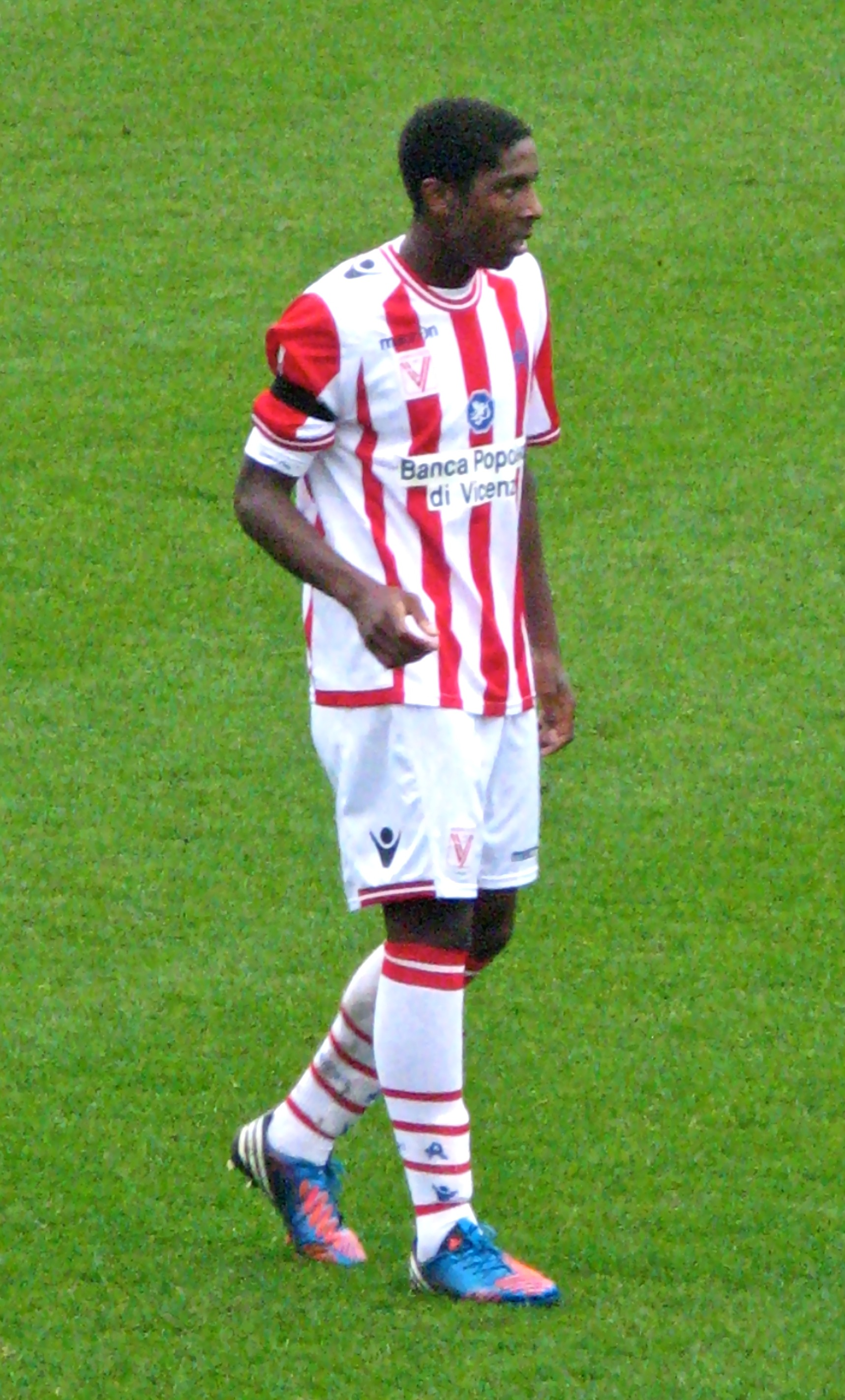
Malonga with Vicenza in 2012

On 31 August 2012, Malonga joined Serie B side Vicenza on a season-long loan. Malonga made his debut soon after against Cesena and scored in a 3–1 win. Malonga would then add three more goal in his next three games against Juve Stabia, Hellas Verona and Brescia Calcio. At the end of the season, Malonga had scored a total of 10 goals at Vicenza.

On 2 September 2013, he joined Spanish Segunda División side Real Murcia on a season-long loan. After making the move to Spain, Malonga stated that his aim for the season was to score more than the ten goals he had produced at Vicenza. Malonga made his debut for the club on 21 September 2013, coming on as a substitute in the 60th minutes, in a draw against SD Eibar. It took until 15 December 2013 for Malonga to score his first goal for the club, in a 3–1 win over Barcelona B. Malonga would score four further goals that season, thus failing to achieve his aim of scoring ten in the season.

Malonga was released by Cesena on 24 July 2014 ahead of the 2014–15 season.

=== Hibernian ===
On 5 September 2014, it was announced that Malonga had joined Hibernian on a two-year contract. He scored on his debut as Hibernian beat Cowdenbeath 3–2 on 13 September 2014. On 26 October 2014, Malonga scored the opening goal in the Edinburgh Derby against Hearts, but a late equaliser meant Hibernian had to settle for a 1–1 draw. On 22 November 2014, he scored a hat-trick as Hibernian won 6–3 away at Dumbarton. His contract was due to finish in the summer of 2016 but left the club on 27 January 2016. Malonga's last goal for Hibernian was scored in his penultimate appearance for the club, during a Scottish Cup Fourth Round match win against Raith Rovers. Hibernian would go on to win the tournament for the first time in 114 years.

=== Pro Vercelli ===
Malonga subsequently returned to Italy, signing for Serie B side Pro Vercelli for an undisclosed fee from Hibernian.

=== Elche ===
Malonga left Pro Vercelli in January 2017 by mutual consent and subsequently joined Segunda División side Elche.

=== Servette ===
On 28 August 2017, Malonga signed with Swiss Challenge League side Servette. He made six substitute appearances that season in the league and one substitute appearance in the Swiss Cup, but failed to make an appearance in the second half of the season.

=== Chania ===
After leaving Servette in the summer, Malonga went on trial with Tunisian Ligue Professionnelle 1 side Club Africain in August 2018.

On 12 September 2018, Malonga signed with Greek Football League side Chania Kissamikos. On 27 October 2018, he made his debut as a 59th-minute substitute against Sparta and scored a penalty. He would make five more league appearances that season, including two starts.

=== Cavalry FC ===
On 27 March 2019, Malonga signed with Canadian Premier League side Cavalry FC. Malonga was a key player in Cavalry's inaugural season, scoring thirteen goals in all competitions, and being nominated for CPL Player of the Year, as Cavalry finished the season as runners up. Malonga would not be listed on Cavalry's training camp roster for the 2020 season, ending his time with the club after one season.

=== Lokomotiv Plovdiv ===
On 6 March 2020, Malonga signed a contract with Bulgarian First League club Lokomotiv Plovdiv. On 1 July 2020, he came on as a substitute during the Bulgarian Cup final and scored one of the penalties in the shootout to help Lokomotiv Plovdiv defeat CSKA Sofia and lift the trophy. Despite performing well during his few appearances for the "railwaymen", Malonga left the club in mid July 2020, in part due to physical fitness issues and not being considered a good fit for the style of football promoted by the manager Bruno Akrapović.

=== KPV and Þór Akureyri ===
On 26 February 2021, Malongo joined Finnish club Kokkolan Palloveikot, also known as KPV. He made seven appearances for the club, before he moved to Icelandic club Þór Akureyri in the beginning of July 2021.

== International career ==
On 30 August 2012, he received a call-up to the Congo national team. Malonga also previously represented France U19.

Malonga was again selected by the Congo in November 2014. He made his first full international appearance in 1–0 win for Congo against Sudan. The victory for Congo secured their qualification for the 2015 Africa Cup of Nations. Malonga was named as a substitute for all four of Congo's matches in the Cup of Nations in January 2015, coming on during the second half in three of them, including the quarter-final defeat at the hands of neighbours D.R. Congo.

== Career statistics ==
=== Club ===
As of 29 July 2020.

Appearances and goals by club, season and competition
Club	Season	League			National Cup (Note: Includes appearances in the Coppa Italia, Copa del Rey, Scottish Cup and Canadian Championship.)		League Cup (Note: Includes appearances in the Scottish League Cup.)		Continental		Other (Note: Includes appearances in the Scottish Premiership play-offs, Scottish Challenge Cup and Canadian Premier League Finals.)		Total	
Club	Season	Division	Apps	Goals	Apps	Goals	Apps	Goals	Apps	Goals	Apps	Goals	Apps	Goals
Torino	2007–08	Serie A	9	1	0	0	—		—		0	0	9	1
Torino	2008–09	Serie A	0	0	0	0	—		—		0	0	0	0
Torino	Total		9	1	0	0	—		—		0	0	9	1
Foggia (loan)	2008–09	Lega Pro Prima Divisione	10	1	0	0	—		—		0	0	10	1
Cesena	2009–10	Serie B	22	8	0	0	—		—		0	0	22	8
Cesena	2010–11	Serie A	22	2	1	0	—		—		0	0	23	2
Cesena	2011–12	Serie A	13	0	1	0	—		—		0	0	14	0
Cesena	2012–13	Serie B	0	0	0	0	—		—		0	0	0	0
Cesena	2013–14	Serie B	0	0	0	0	—		—		0	0	0	0
Cesena	Total		57	10	2	0	—		—		0	0	59	10
Vicenza (loan)	2012–13	Serie B	38	10	0	0	—		—		0	0	38	10
Murcia (loan)	2013–14	Segunda División	28	5	1	0	—		—		0	0	29	5
Hibernian	2014–15	Scottish Championship	24	13	3	0	2	3	—		2	0	31	16
Hibernian	2015–16	Scottish Championship	19	4	1	1	2	1	—		1	0	23	6
Hibernian	Total		43	17	4	1	4	4	—		3	0	54	22
Pro Vercelli	2015–16	Serie B	16	3	—		—		—		0	0	16	3
Pro Vercelli	2016–17	Serie B	0	0	0	0	—		—		0	0	0	0
Pro Vercelli	Total		16	3	0	0	—		—		0	0	16	3
Elche	2016–17	Segunda División	9	1	—		—		—		0	0	9	1
Servette	2017–18	Swiss Challenge League	6	0	1	0	—		—		0	0	7	0
Chania	2018–19	Greek Football League	6	1	2	0	—		—		0	0	8	1
Cavalry FC	2019	Canadian Premier League	24	11	5	2	—		—		2	0	31	13
Lokomotiv Plovdiv	2019–20	Bulgarian First League	7	3	3	0	—		—		0	0	10	3
Career total			253	63	18	3	4	4	—		5	0	280	70

=== International ===
As of 31 January 2017.

Appearances and goals by national team and year
National team	Year	Apps	Goals
Congo	2014	1	0
Congo	2015	4	0
Congo	2016	2	0
Congo	2017	0	0
Total		7	0

== Honours ==
=== Club ===
Cavalry FC

- Canadian Premier League Finals: runners-up 2019
- Canadian Premier League (Regular season): Spring 2019, Fall 2019

Lokomotiv Plovdiv

- Bulgarian Cup: 2019–20
