= Jordan Brown (footballer, born 1996) =

English footballer

Personal information
- Full name: Jordan Antonio Brown
- Date of birth: 10 November 1996 (age 30)
- Place of birth: Brent, London, England
- Height: 1.73 m (5 ft 8 in)
- Position: Forward

Team information
- Current team: Burnham

Youth career
- 2005–2013: Arsenal
- 2013–2015: West Ham United

Senior career*
Years	Team	Apps	(Gls)
2015–2016	West Ham United	0	(0)
2015	→ Chelmsford City (loan)	3	(0)
2016–2018	Hannover 96 II	40	(9)
2018	Barnet	0	(0)
2018–2019	Znojmo	4	(0)
2019–2020	Cavalry FC	33	(7)
2020–2021	VfR Aalen	11	(1)
2021	Fylkir	13	(0)
2022	Electric City FC	17	(11)
2022	Pacific FC	8	(1)
2024	Northwood	5	(0)
2024–2025	Egham Town	25	(5)
2025–	Burnham	0	(0)

International career
2011–2012	England U16	4	(0)
2011–2013	England U17	7	(3)
- * Club domestic league appearances and goals as of 20:32, 21 April 2025 (UTC)

Jordan Antonio Brown (born 10 November 1996) is an English footballer who plays as a forward for Burnham.

Having started his football career with the Arsenal academy, Brown made his competitive debut for West Ham United in 2015 and his since played in Germany, Czech Republic, Canada and Iceland.

== Club career ==
Having been with Arsenal youth team for eight years, Brown joined West Ham in 2013 as he considered there would be greater opportunities to play football. He was first included in a West Ham matchday squad for their UEFA Europa League first qualifying round second leg fixture away to Lusitanos of Andorra on 9 July 2015, remaining an unused substitute in a 1–0 victory (4–0 aggregate). With manager Slaven Bilić putting priority on the team's Premier League performance, he made an array of changes for their third qualifying round second leg away to FC Astra Giurgiu on 6 August, and Brown made his debut as an 80th-minute substitute for Elliot Lee in a 2–1 defeat which saw his team eliminated. On 9 October 2015, Brown joined Chelmsford City on a one-month loan.

On 2 June 2016, Brown announced he had signed for Hannover 96 via his Instagram social media account. His contract was terminated by mutual consent after 18 months in Germany.

Brown returned to London and signed for Barnet, but following a long wait for international clearance and the departure of Graham Westley as manager, Brown was released by new manager Martin Allen in March 2018.

On 18 October 2018, Brown joined Czech National Football League side Znojmo.

On 30 January 2019, Brown signed for Canadian Premier League side Cavalry FC. In the 2019 Canadian Championship quartfinals, Brown would score the opening goal as Cavalry would upset Major League Soccer side Vancouver Whitecaps, knocking them out of the tournament. In December 2019, Cavalry announced Brown would return to the club for the 2020 season.

On 22 October 2020, Brown signed a one-year contract with Regionalliga side VfR Aalen. He left the club in March 2021 after asking to terminate his contract.

In 2022, he returned to Canada, signing with Electric City FC in League1 Ontario. He led the team in scoring in 2022 with 11 goals.

On 22 August 2022, he returned to the Canadian Premier League, signing with Pacific FC through the 2023 season, with an option for 2024. After the 2022 season, he agreed to mutually terminate the remainder of his contract.

In the summer of 2024, he signed with Northwood in the English eighth tier Southern League Division One Central.

After five appearances, he joined Egham Town in September 2024.

In June 2025, after a spell playing in Baller League UK, Brown joined Combined Counties League side Burnham.

== Career statistics ==
As of 22 August 2022

Club statistics
Club	Season	League			National Cup (Note: Includes appearances in the FA Cup and Canadian Championship.)		League Cup		Continental (Note: Includes appearances in the UEFA Europa League.)		Other (Note: Includes appearances in the Canadian Premier League Finals.)		Total	
Club	Season	Division	Apps	Goals	Apps	Goals	Apps	Goals	Apps	Goals	Apps	Goals	Apps	Goals
West Ham United	2015–16	Premier League	0	0	0	0	0	0	1	0	0	0	1	0
Chelmsford City (loan)	2015–16	National League South	3	0	1	0	0	0	—		0	0	4	0
Hannover 96 II	2016–17	Regionalliga Nord	26	6	—		—		—		0	0	26	6
Hannover 96 II	2017–18	Regionalliga Nord	14	3	—		—		—		0	0	14	3
Hannover 96 II	Total		40	9	0	0	0	0	0	0	0	0	40	9
Znojmo	2018–19	Czech National Football League	4	0	0	0	—		—		0	0	4	0
Cavalry FC	2019	Canadian Premier League	23	4	7	1	—		—		2	0	32	5
Cavalry FC	2020	Canadian Premier League	10	3	0	0	—		—		0	0	10	3
Cavalry FC	Total		33	7	7	1	0	0	0	0	2	0	42	8
VfR Aalen	2020–21	Regionalliga Südwest	11	1	0	0	—		—		0	0	11	1
Fylkir	2021	Úrvalsdeild	13	0	3	0	—		—		0	0	16	0
Electric City FC	2022	League1 Ontario	17	11	—		—		—		—		17	11
Career total			121	28	11	1	0	0	1	0	2	0	135	29

== Honours ==
=== Club ===
Calvary FC

- Canadian Premier League Finals
  - Runners-up: 2019
- Canadian Premier League (Regular season):
  - Champions: Spring 2019, Fall 2019
