= Sergio Camargo =

Canadian soccer player (born 1994)

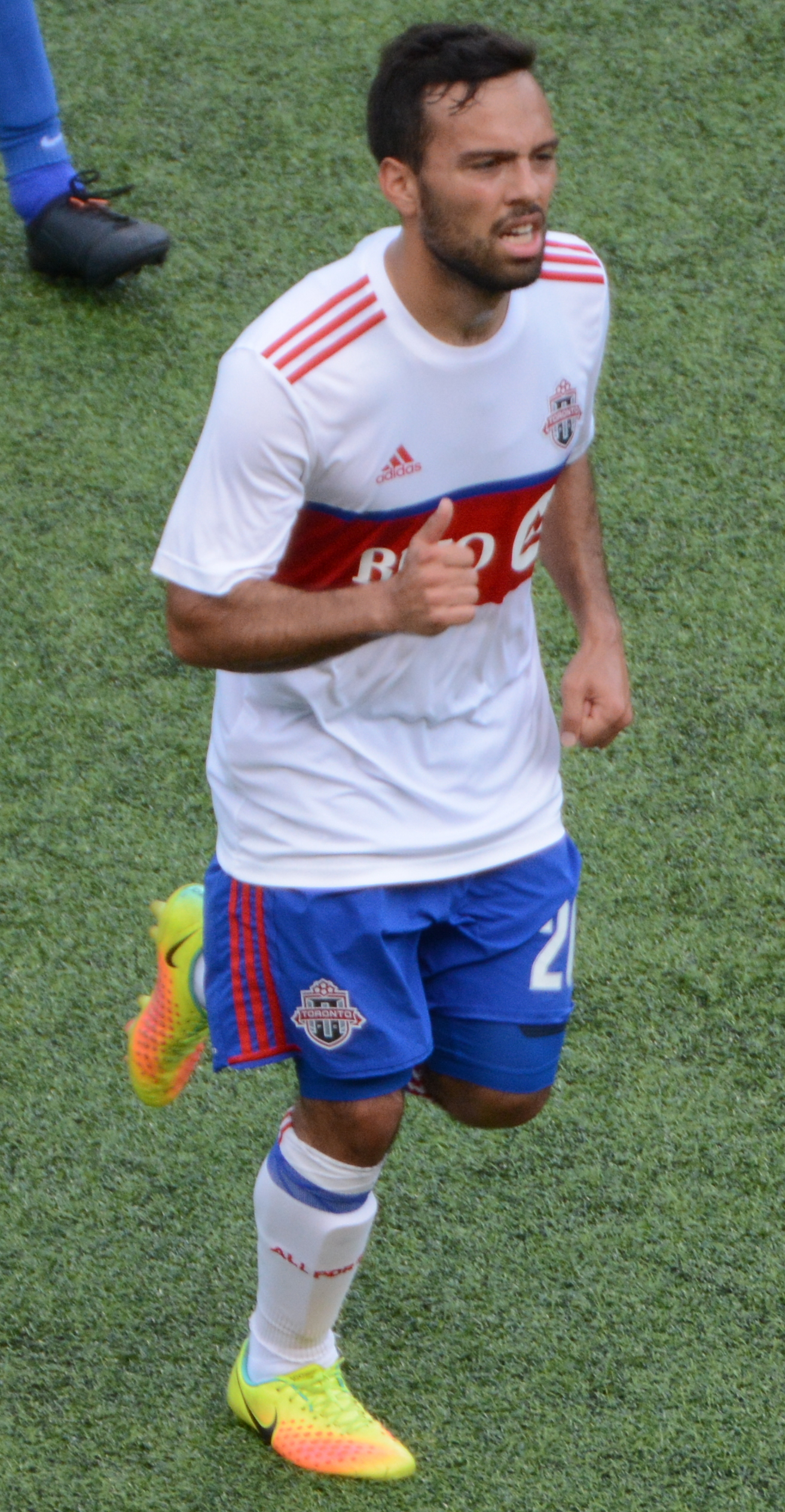
- Camargo playing for Toronto FC II in 2017

Personal information
- Full name: Sergio Andres Camargo Peñaranda
- Date of birth: August 16, 1994 (age 32)
- Place of birth: Cúcuta, Colombia
- Height: 1.70 m (5 ft 7 in)
- Position: Midfielder

Team information
- Current team: Cavalry FC
- Number: 10

Youth career
- 2001–2008: Unionville-Milliken SC
- 2009–2013: Toronto FC

College career
Years	Team	Apps	(Gls)
2013–2015	Coastal Carolina Chanticleers	58	(19)
2016	Syracuse Orange	17	(4)

Senior career*
Years	Team	Apps	(Gls)
2015–2016	K-W United FC	17	(13)
2017	Toronto FC II	18	(1)
2017	Toronto FC	0	(0)
2018	Calgary Foothills	10	(4)
2019–	Cavalry FC	154	(33)

International career^{‡}
2010–2011	Canada U17	2	(0)
- * Club domestic league appearances and goals as of September 19, 2026 ‡ National team caps and goals as of July 6, 2019

Sergio Andres Camargo Peñaranda (born August 16, 1994) is a Canadian professional soccer player who plays as a midfielder for Cavalry FC in the Canadian Premier League.

== Club career ==
=== Toronto FC ===
In 2009, Camargo went on trial with Vitória de Guimarães in Portugal and was offered a contract, however, because of a FIFA regulation that would have required his parents to move to Portugal in order to be allowed to play for the club, he was unable to join the team. Instead, he returned to Canada and joined Toronto FC.

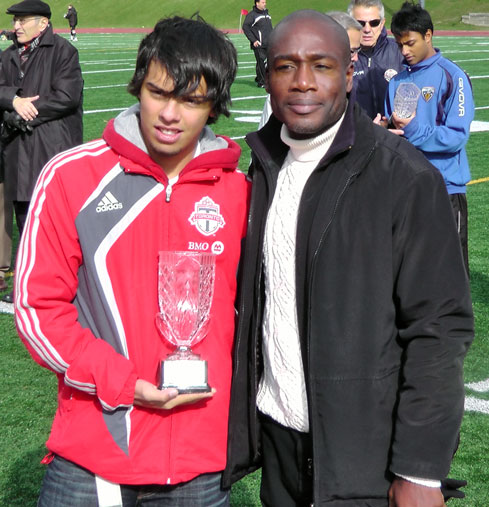
Camargo receives CSL Division II Rookie of the Year Award in 2010

Camargo began his career in 2009 with TFC Academy II in the Second Division of the Canadian Soccer League, later moving up to the team in the First Division. In 2010, he was named the divisions MVP and Rookie of the Year. From 2013 to 2016 he played college soccer with Coastal Carolina Chanticleers, and Syracuse Orange. During his stint in college his achievements were being named to the 2015 All-Big South Second Team and the 2013 Big South All-Freshman team. In 2015, he played with K-W United in the USL Premier Development League, where he captained the team to the PDL Championship. In 2017, Toronto FC of the Major League Soccer signed him to a HGP contract. He was loaned to Toronto FC II in the United Soccer League, and made his debut on April 1, 2017 against the Tampa Bay Rowdies. Following the 2017 season, Camargo's option was not picked up, ending his contract with the club.

=== Calgary Foothills ===
In 2018, he was originally set to join his former youth club Unionville-Milliken in League1 Ontario, but later was able to join Calgary Foothills FC in the USL PDL. He scored four goals in ten regular season appearances and made three playoff appearances, helping Calgary win its first PDL Championship.

=== Cavalry FC ===
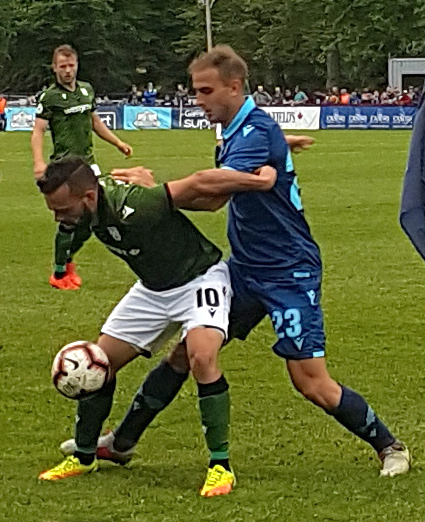
Sergio Camargo battling with Matthew Arnone

Camargo joined Cavalry FC of the Canadian Premier League in November 2018. He made his CPL debut on 4 May 2019 in a 2–1 win over York9. He scored his first two goals for Cavalry on 15 June 2019 in a 3–0 win over FC Edmonton. Camargo scored a goal against Montreal Impact in the Canadian Championship semi-final on 7 August 2019 in a 2–1 loss. In total, he scored six goals in eighteen league appearances that season. On 13 November 2019, Camargo re-signed with Cavalry for the 2020 season. In November 2020, Camargo would re-sign with the club for the 2021 season, his third season with the club. In January 2022, it was announced Camargo would return for the 2022 season, his fourth with the club. In January 2023, Cavalry announced they had re-signed Camargo to a contract extension through the 2024 season.

Prior to the 2024 season, Camargo would sign another contract extension with Cavalry, keeping him at the club through the 2025 season, with an option for 2026. He would also suit up in his 100th game for the club in 2024, becoming the third player in club history to appear in 100 games after Marco Carducci and Jose Escalante. On November 10, 2024, he scored a goal in a 2–1 victory over Forge FC in the 2024 CPL final, helping the club win their first league title. After Marco Carducci's departure in 2025, Camargo would be named captain. In June 2026, Camargo would sign a contract extension through the end of the 2028 season.

== International career ==
Camargo is eligible to play internationally for Colombia by birth and for Canada by naturalization.

On June 22, 2011, Camargo made his debut for the Canada men's national under-17 soccer team in the 2011 FIFA U-17 World Cup.

== Personal life ==
Camargo was born in Cúcuta to Colombian parents. At age four he and his parents moved to Toronto, and then to Newmarket, Ontario when he was nine.

== Career statistics ==
As of November 21, 2026

Club statistics
Club	Season	League			Playoffs		National Cup (Note: Includes appearances and goals in the Canadian Championship.)		Continental		Total	
Club	Season	Division	Apps	Goals	Apps	Goals	Apps	Goals	Apps	Goals	Apps	Goals
Toronto FC II	2017	United Soccer League	18	1	—		—		—		18	1
Toronto FC	2017	Major League Soccer	0	0	0	0	0	0	—		0	0
Calgary Foothills	2018	Premier Development League	10	4	3	0	—		—		13	4
Cavalry FC	2019	Canadian Premier League	18	6	2	0	6	2	—		26	8
Cavalry FC	2020	Canadian Premier League	2	1	0	0	0	0	—		2	1
Cavalry FC	2021	Canadian Premier League	22	4	1	0	2	0	—		25	4
Cavalry FC	2022	Canadian Premier League	14	2	1	0	1	0	—		16	2
Cavalry FC	2023	Canadian Premier League	25	6	3	0	0	0	—		28	6
Cavalry FC	2024	Canadian Premier League	24	2	2	1	3	0	2	0	31	3
Cavalry FC	2025	Canadian Premier League	27	8	1	0	2	0	2	0	32	8
Cavalry FC	2026	Canadian Premier League	22	4	2	1	3	0	0	0	27	5
Cavalry FC	Total		154	33	12	2	17	2	4	0	187	37
Career total			182	38	15	2	17	2	4	0	218	42

== Honours ==
=== Club ===
K-W United FC

- PDL Championship: 2015

Calgary Foothills

- PDL Championship: 2018

Cavalry FC

- Canadian Premier League Finals
  - Runners-up: 2019, 2023
  - Winner: 2024
- Canadian Premier League (Regular season):
  - Champions: Spring 2019, Fall 2019

Individual

- Canadian Soccer League MVP Reserve Division: 2010
- Canadian Soccer League Rookie of the Year Reserve Division: 2010
