= Elijah Adekugbe =

English footballer

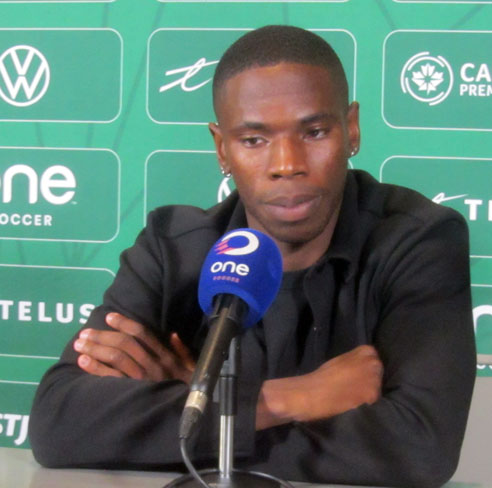
- Adekugbe in 2024

Personal information
- Date of birth: 26 April 1996 (age 30)
- Place of birth: London, England
- Height: 1.75 m (5 ft 9 in)
- Position: Midfielder

Youth career
- 2000–2004: Manchester City
- 2004–2011: Calgary Foothills FC
- 2011–2012: Vancouver Whitecaps FC
- 2012–2014: Calgary Foothills FC

College career
Years	Team	Apps	(Gls)
2014–2016	Trinity Western Spartans	44	(9)

Senior career*
Years	Team	Apps	(Gls)
2015–2018	Calgary Foothills FC	36	(6)
2019–2022	Cavalry FC	48	(3)
2023–2025	York United	63	(1)
2026	Preston Lions FC	8	(0)
- * Club domestic league appearances and goals as of May 31, 2026

Elijah Adekugbe (born 26 April 1996) is an English professional footballer who last played for Australian NPL Victoria club Preston Lions FC.

== Early life ==
Adekugbe was born in London, England, and grew up in Manchester. He is of Nigerian descent. In 2000, Adekugbe joined the Manchester City Academy, where he played until 2004.

In 2004, he moved to Calgary, Canada with his family and joined the Calgary Foothills SC. As the U12 level, Adekugbe represented Western Canada at the Danone Nations Cup and also played for the Alberta provincial team from U13 to U15 level.

In September 2011, he joined the Vancouver Whitecaps Academy. Two years later, he returned to the Calgary Foothills at U16 level.

== University career ==
Adekugbe received a soccer scholarship with Trinity Western University, playing for the men's soccer team from 2014 to 2016. He scored his first goal on September 6, 2014, against the Victoria Vikes. On October 3, 2015, he scored a late second half free kick to salvage a 1–1 draw against the UBC Okanagan Heat.

On August 27, 2016, he scored two goals against the UNBC Timberwolves. After the 2016 season, he was named a Canada West First Team All-Star.

== Club career ==
In 2015, Adekugbe began playing his former youth club Calgary Foothills FC in the Premier Development League. In 2015, he was the team's Golden Boot and MVP winner, as well as the Supporters MVP.

In 2016, he served as vice-captain of the team. In June 2016, he was named to the PDL Top 50 Prospects list. He missed the entire 2017 season, after suffering an Achilles tendon injury during pre-season.

In 2018, he was named to the PDL All-Western Conference Team and won the PDL title with the club. In December 2018, Adekugbe signed a professional contract with Cavalry FC of the Canadian Premier League, ahead of the 2019 season. He was named vice-captain of the team in his first season. He made his debut in the team's inaugural match on May 4, 2019, against York9 FC.

He scored his first professional goal on October 5, 2019, in a 2–0 win over the HFX Wanderers. He helped the club reach the CPL final, but missed both legs of the final due to injury. He was named to the CPL Fan Awards Team of the Year in 2019. After the season, it was announced he would be returning for the 2020 season.

In November 2020, he re-signed with the club. In April 2021, during pre-season, he tore his Achilles tendon, requiring him to undergo surgery and to miss the entire 2021 season. On May 21, 2022, he scored a stoppage time winning goal over Valour FC in a 2–1 victory. After the 2022 season, he departed the club.

In December 2022, Adekugbe joined York United for the 2023 season. On July 26, 2024, he scored his first goal for York United in a 4–1 victory over Atlético Ottawa. In December 2024, he extended his contract for another season, with a club option for 2026.

In February 2026, he joined Australian NPL Victoria club Preston Lions FC.

== Personal life ==
He is the brother of Canada national team player Sam Adekugbe. Adekugbe has also launched a music career, releasing his first EP in 2021, which included a song called "Dream Team" which referenced his club team Cavalry FC and teammates.

== Career statistics ==
As of match played October 27, 2025

Appearances and goals by club, season and competition
Club	Season	League			Playoffs		National cup		Continental		Total	
Club	Season	Division	Apps	Goals	Apps	Goals	Apps	Goals	Apps	Goals	Apps	Goals
Calgary Foothills FC	2015	Premier Development League	10	4	—		—		—		10	4
Calgary Foothills FC	2016	Premier Development League	12	2	4	0	—		—		16	2
Calgary Foothills FC	2017	Premier Development League	0	0	0	0	—		—		0	0
Calgary Foothills FC	2018	Premier Development League	14	0	4	0	—		—		18	0
Calgary Foothills FC	Total		36	6	8	0	0	0	0	0	44	0
Cavalry FC	2019	Canadian Premier League	19	1	0	0	5	0	—		24	1
Cavalry FC	2020	Canadian Premier League	9	1	—		—		—		9	1
Cavalry FC	2021	Canadian Premier League	0	0	0	0	0	0	—		0	0
Cavalry FC	2022	Canadian Premier League	20	1	2	0	0	0	—		22	1
Cavalry FC	Total		48	3	2	0	5	0	0	0	55	3
York United FC	2023	Canadian Premier League	15	0	0	0	1	0	—		16	0
York United FC	2024	Canadian Premier League	27	1	2	0	1	0	—		30	1
York United FC	2025	Canadian Premier League	21	0	2	0	2	0	—		25	0
York United FC	Total		63	1	4	0	4	0	0	0	71	1
Career total			147	10	14	0	9	0	0	0	170	10

== Honours ==
Calgary Foothills

- PDL Championship: 2018

Individual

- PDL All-Western Conference Team: 2018
