= Calgary Foothills FC =

Calgary Foothills
- Full name: Calgary Foothills Football Club
- Short name: CFFC
- Founded: 1972; 54 years ago
- Stadium: Foothills Composite High School
- Head coach: Jay Wheeldon
- League: Alberta Premier League
- 2025: L1AB, 4th
- Website: gofoothills.ca
Home colours	Away colours

Calgary Foothills Football Club is a Canadian soccer club based in Calgary, Alberta, that competes in the Alberta Premier League. The club was founded as a youth club in 1972 and joined as a USL2 franchise in 2015. The team plays its home games at the Foothills Composite High School in Okotoks. The team colours are green and white.

== History ==
Calgary had previously hosted the Calgary Storm of USL2 (then known as Premier Development League) during the 2001 season. Calgary Foothills FC launched in 2014 as they played a series of exhibition games against Vancouver Whitecaps U 23's, FC Edmonton Reserves, and local university clubs.

The club's inaugural game was played on May 17, 2015 against Puget Sound Gunners FC, winning 2–1. The club finished 4th in the Northwest Division in 2015 with a 3–2–7 record, ultimately missing the playoffs.

In the 2016 season, Calgary Foothills won the Northwest Division with an 8–3–3 record, despite only 4% of supporters predicting the club would win the division. In the playoffs, Calgary Foothills would defeat Seattle Sounders U-23, FC Golden State Force, and FC Tucson to win the Western Conference. Calgary Foothills would later defeat Ocean City Nor'easters in the semifinals to advance to the 2016 final against Michigan Bucks. Calgary would lose the final 3–2 on a controversial penalty decision in the 86th minute.

In the 2017 season, despite losing key players Elijah Adekugbe and Dominic Russo to injury, Calgary Foothills would improve on their point total from the season before, finishing second in the Northwest Division on goal differential to Portland Timbers U-23. The club would lose to Portland in the Northwest Division play-in game. Off the pitch, the club would open an $11 million indoor training facility, the first of its kind in Western Canada.

After playing in three stadiums in three years, and struggling to find a venue that met league standards in Calgary, the club would move 20 km south to the town of Okotoks for the 2018 season to play at Foothills Composite High School stadium. Prior to the start of the season, the club made headlines when Canadian national women's team goalkeeper Stephanie Labbé would try out for the USL2 squad. The club would have their best season to date during 2018, only losing once in 14 games, and would become Western Conference champions after defeating Colorado Rapids U-23 and FC Tucson. Foothills would advance to the league final for the second time in three seasons after defeating Chicago FC United, and would win the 2018 Championship 4–2 after extra time, over Reading United AC.

The Foothills played in Saskatoon for the first ever SK Summer Soccer Series which is hosted by the Saskatchewan Selects. The Foothills defeated the Selects 2–1 in front of 3,067 people.

In April 2020, Calgary Foothills announced their withdrawal from the 2020 USL League Two season due to the COVID-19 pandemic. That same month, the league announced the 2020 season would be cancelled.

In 2023, they joined League1 Alberta, playing in the league's exhibition series, ahead of the official launch the following season. In 2023, they won the league's exhibition series championship.

== Youth system ==
The Foothills have a full youth academy system from ages U4-U18 for boys and girls. Teams play in the Calgary Minor Soccer Association (CMSA) Tiers 1–6. The Generation program consists of the top players in U15 and U17 boys and girls. These teams are prepared to qualify and compete for the Canada Soccer Toyota National Championship.

== Supporters' groups ==
The Foot Soldiers were founded in February 2015 with the intention of bringing a passionate atmosphere to Calgary Foothills FC games.

== Coaching staff ==
- (Canada) Jay Wheeldon – Head coach
- (Canada) Paul Ferries – Assistant coach
- Mark McLaren – Assistant coach

== Roster ==
As of 28 March 2024

Note: Flags indicate national team as defined under FIFA eligibility rules; some limited exceptions apply. Players may hold more than one non-FIFA nationality.

No.	Pos.	Nation	Player
—	GK	USA	Anthony Martinez
—	GK	CAN	Liam Collens
—	DF	ENG	Cameron Kilbride
—	DF	CAN	Joey Plenzik
—	DF	CAN	Hyunsoo Ryu
—	DF	CAN	Noah Hrdlicka
—	DF	PHI	Miguel Mendoza
—	MF	CAN	Miguel Da Rocha
—	MF	CAN	Owen Antoniuk
—	MF	CAN	Max Piepgrass

No.	Pos.	Nation	Player
—	MF	CAN	Gianmarco Plenzik
—	MF	CAN	Skyler Rogers
—	FW	CAN	Soliman Aria
—	FW	NGR	Emmanuel Dan-Adokiene
—	FW	CAN	Josh Flaksman
—	FW	CAN	Charles Nana
—	FW	CAN	Garry Onyejelem
—	FW	CAN	Owen Sheppard

== Notable former players ==
=== USL2/L1AB Squad ===
- (South Sudan) William Akio
- (Canada) Owen Antoniuk
- (England) Cory Bent
- (Guinea) Mamadi Camara
- (Canada) Sergio Camargo
- (Canada) Marco Carducci
- (Canada) Jackson Farmer
- (Republic of Ireland) Tom Field
- (Canada) Jordan Haynes
- (France) Bradley Kamdem
- (Canada) Nik Ledgerwood
- (Canada) Sean Melvin
- (Canada) Dean Northover
- (Canada) Carlos Patino
- (Canada) Dylon Powley
- (Canada) Skyler Rogers
- (Canada) Chris Serban
- (Canada) Gareth Smith-Doyle
- (Canada) Joel Waterman
- (Canada) Jonathan Wheeldon
- (Canada) Nolan Wirth
- (Canada) Bruno Zebie
- Canadian women's national team goalkeeper Stephanie Labbé had a tryout with the team in preparation for the 2018 season, posting a shutout against the Lethbridge Pronghorns men's soccer team.

=== Foothills Academy ===
- (England) Elijah Adekugbe
- (Canada) Sam Adekugbe
- (Canada) Owen Antoniuk
- (Canada) Michael Cox
- (Nigeria) Tofa Fakunle
- (Canada) Paul Hamilton
- (England) Owen Hargreaves
- (Canada) Michael Harms
- (Canada) Daniel Kaiser
- (Canada) Markus Kaiser
- (Canada) Victor Loturi
- (Canada) Kevin McKenna
- (United States) Chituru Odunze
- (England) Aribim Pepple
- (Canada) Max Piepgrass
- (Canada) Skyler Rogers
- (Canada) Gareth Smith-Doyle
- (Canada) Charlie Trafford
- (Canada) Dominick Zator
- Source: Calgary Foothills FC

== Club records ==
=== Most appearances ===
League and playoffs

#	Pos.	Name	Nation	Career	League	Playoffs	Total
1	Forward	Tofa Fakunle	Canada	2015–2019	51	9	60
2	Defender	Dean Northover	Canada	2015–2018	49	9	58
3	Midfielder	Nico Pasquotti	Canada	2016–2018	38	10	48
4	Midfielder	Elijah Adekugbe	Canada	2015–2018	38	8	46
5	Defender	Dominick Zator	Canada	2015–2018	36	9	45
6	Forward	Ajeej Sarkaria	Canada	2016–2018	33	9	42
7	Midfielder	Kyle Jones	Canada	2016–2018	35	5	40
8	Forward	Dominic Russo	Canada	2015–2017	31	6	37
9	Forward	William Akio	Canada	2017–2019	29	6	35
10	Defender	Jonathan Wheeldon	England	2015–2018	28	6	34

Bolded players are currently on the Calgary Foothills roster.

As of July 22, 2019

=== Top goalscorers ===
League and playoffs

#	Pos.	Name	Nation	Career	League	Playoffs	Total
1	Forward	Dominic Russo	Canada	2015–2017	11	4	15
2	Forward	William Akio	Canada	2017–2019	13	1	14
3	Forward	Ali Musse	Canada	2017–2018	7	5	12
4	Forward	Moses Danto	Canada	2018–2019	11	0	11
5	Forward	Tofa Fakunle	Canada	2016–2019	8	2	10
6	Midfielder	Kyle Jones	Canada	2016–2018	7	1	8
7	Midfielder	Nico Pasquotti	Canada	2016–2018	4	3	7
8	Midfielder	Elijah Adekugbe	Canada	2015–2018	6	0	6
8	Forward	Ajeej Sarkaria	Canada	2016–2018	4	2	6
10	Midfielder	Aribim Pepple	Canada	2019	3	1	4

Bolded players are currently on the Calgary Foothills roster.

As of July 22, 2019

== Record ==
=== Year-by-year ===
Season	League	Division	Teams	Record	Rank	Playoffs	Ref
2015	Premier Development League	Northwest Division	7	3–7–2	4th	did not qualify	
2016	Premier Development League	Northwest Division	7	8–3–3	1st	Championship Final	
2017	Premier Development League	Northwest Division	6	8–4–2	2nd	Divisional Qualification	
2018	Premier Development League	Northwest Division	6	11–2–1	1st	Champions	
2019	USL League Two	Northwest Division	6	9–2–3	1st	Conference Semifinals	
2020	USL League Two	Season cancelled due to COVID-19 pandemic					
2021	USL League Two	Did not play due to COVID-19 pandemic travel restrictions					
2022	Did not play						
2023	League1 Alberta Exhibition Series		5	6–2–0	1st	Champions	
2024	League1 Alberta		7	7–2–3	2nd	Finalists	
2025	League1 Alberta		9	8–2–6	4th		

== Honours ==
- USL League Two
  - National Champions: 2018
  - Western Conference Champions: 2016, 2018
  - Northwest Division Champions: 2016, 2018

== Player honours ==
Year	Pos	Player	Country	Honour
2016	F	Dominic Russo	CAN	All-League Team; All-Western Conference Team
2018	GK	Marco Carducci	CAN	Goalkeeper of the Year; All-League Team; All-Western Conference Team
2018	F	Moses Danto	CAN	All-League Team; All-Western Conference Team
2018	M	Elijah Adekugbe	CAN	All-Western Conference Team
2018	M	Nico Pasquotti	CAN	All-Western Conference Team
2018	D	Dominick Zator	CAN	All-Western Conference Team
