= Chris Șerban =

Canadian soccer player (born 1995)

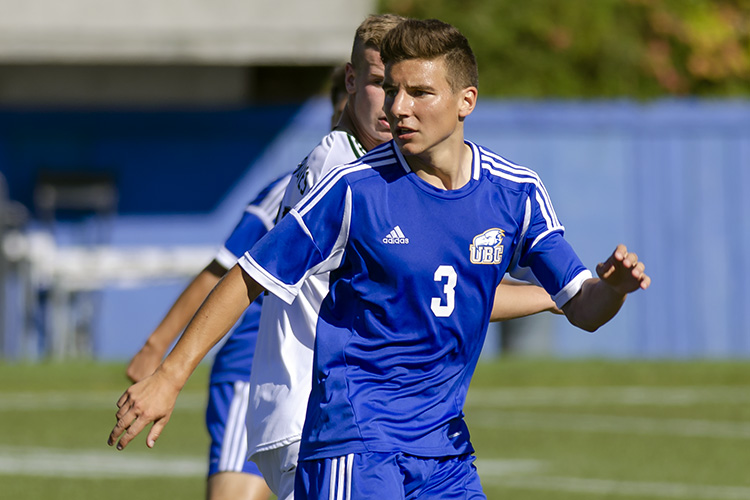
- Şerban playing for the UBC Thunderbirds in 2014

Personal information
- Full name: Rareș Șerban
- Date of birth: November 15, 1995 (age 30)
- Place of birth: Bistrița, Romania
- Height: 1.75 m (5 ft 9 in)
- Position: Defender

Youth career
- 2008–2013: Calgary Villains FC
- 2013–2014: Vancouver Whitecaps FC

College career
Years	Team	Apps	(Gls)
2014	UBC Thunderbirds	16	(0)

Senior career*
Years	Team	Apps	(Gls)
2014	Vancouver Whitecaps U-23	9	(0)
2015–2017	Whitecaps FC 2	40	(2)
2018	Calgary Foothills	6	(0)
2019	Cavalry FC	0	(0)

International career^{‡}
2014–2015	Canada U20	8	(0)
2016	Canada U23	2	(0)
- * Club domestic league appearances and goals as of 12 December 2018 ‡ National team caps and goals as of 20 May 2016

Rareș "Chris" Șerban (born November 15, 1995) is a former Canadian soccer player who last played for Cavalry FC in the Canadian Premier League.

== Club career ==
=== Early career ===
Şerban spent his youth career with Calgary Villains FC and spent one year with the Calgary Chinooks before moving to the Whitecaps FC Residency program. He spent his college career at the University of British Columbia. In his only season with the Thunderbirds, he made 16 appearances and tallied two assists, and was named 2014 CIS Rookie of the Year.

Şerban also played in the Premier Development League for Vancouver Whitecaps FC U-23.

=== Whitecaps FC 2 ===
On February 24, 2015, Şerban signed a professional contract with Whitecaps FC 2, a USL affiliate club of Vancouver Whitecaps FC. He made his professional debut on March 29 in a 4–0 defeat to Seattle Sounders FC 2. He would spend three seasons with Whitecaps FC 2 before the club ceased operations after the 2017 season. Şerban would not be signed to a USL deal with the Whitecaps new affiliate, Fresno FC.

=== Cavalry FC ===
After playing the 2018 PDL season with Calgary Foothills FC, Şerban joined Cavalry FC of the Canadian Premier League in December 2018. In April 2019 it was revealed Şerban suffered a season-ending knee injury during a pre-season match with FC Edmonton.

== International career ==
Şerban is eligible to represent Canada through naturalization and Romania through birth.

Şerban was a member of the Canadian under-20 national team that competed in the 2015 CONCACAF U-20 Championship.

In May 2016, Şerban was called to Canada's U23 national team for a pair of friendlies against Guyana and Grenada. Şerban saw action in both matches.

== Personal life ==
Şerban was born in Bistrița, Bistrița-Năsăud to Romanian parents. At age two, he and his family moved to Calgary, Alberta.

== Honours ==
Calgary Foothills

- PDL Championship: 2018

Calvary FC

- Canadian Premier League (Regular season):
  - Champions: Spring 2019, Fall 2019
- Canadian Premier League Finals
  - Runners-up: 2019

Individual

- CIS Rookie of the Year: 2014
