= Tofa Fakunle =

Nigerian professional footballer

Personal information
- Full name: Oluwatofarati Fakunle
- Date of birth: 1 November 1995 (age 31)
- Place of birth: Lagos, Nigeria
- Height: 1.63 m (5 ft 4 in)
- Position: Forward

Youth career
- 2007-2013: Calgary Foothills

Senior career*
Years	Team	Apps	(Gls)
2015–2019	Calgary Foothills	51	(8)
2019–2020	Cavalry FC	3	(0)
- * Club domestic league appearances and goals as of 13 September 2020

Oluwatofarati "Tofa" Fakunle (born 1 November 1995) is a Nigerian former professional footballer. Currently, Fakunle is the assistant general manager for Canadian Premier League club Cavalry FC.

== Club career ==
=== Calgary Foothills ===
Fakunle played for the Calgary Foothills from 2015 until 2019. In 2016 he made eleven league appearances, scoring one goal, and made another five playoff appearances, where he added another goal. The following year, he made twelve appearances for Foothills.

In 2018, Fakunle made thirteen league appearances, scoring one goal, and made a further three appearances in the playoffs as Calgary went on to win the PDL Championship. In 2019, he made thirteen league appearances, scoring six goals, and scored another in one playoff appearance.

=== Cavalry FC ===
After training with the club in preseason that year, Fakunle signed his first professional contract with Canadian Premier League side Cavalry FC on 28 August 2019. He made his debut that day as a substitute in a 1–1 draw against Pacific FC. Fakunle would not be listed on Cavalry's training camp roster for the 2020 season, ending his time with the club after one season. He remained with the club in 2020 as part of the coaching staff, but during an injury crisis was added to the roster for a match against HFX Wanderers, appearing as a late-game substitute.

== Management career ==
Upon completion of his playing career, Fakunle would serve as the operations manager for Cavalry FC, and would later be promoted to assistant general manager prior to the 2022 season.

== Honours ==
=== Club ===
Calvary FC

- Canadian Premier League Finals
  - Runners-up: 2019
- Canadian Premier League (Regular season):
  - Champions: Spring 2019, Fall 2019
