= Nico Pasquotti =

Canadian soccer player

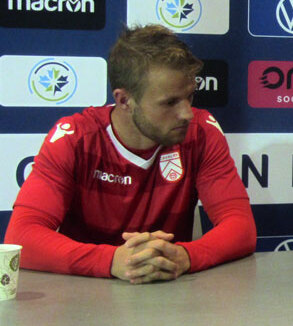
- Pasquotti in 2019

Personal information
- Date of birth: 18 October 1995 (age 31)
- Place of birth: Lethbridge, Alberta, Canada
- Height: 1.78 m (5 ft 10 in)
- Position: Forward

College career
Years	Team	Apps	(Gls)
2016	Lethbridge Horns	14	(1)

Senior career*
Years	Team	Apps	(Gls)
2016–2018	Calgary Foothills	38	(4)
2019–2020	Cavalry FC	31	(5)
- * Club domestic league appearances and goals as of September 9, 2020

Nico Pasquotti (born 18 October 1995) is a Canadian soccer player.

== Club career ==
=== Calgary Foothills ===
In 2016, Pasquotti made twelve appearances for USL Premier Development League side Calgary Foothills, scoring one goal. That fall he attended the University of Lethbridge, where he made fourteen appearances and scored one goal. In 2017, Pasquotti made another thirteen appearances for Foothills.

In 2018, Pasquotti made thirteen league appearances, scoring three goals. In the playoffs that year, he appeared in four playoff matches and scored the game-winning goal as the Foothills went on to win the PDL Championship. Pasquotti was subsequently named MVP of the 2018 PDL Championship.

=== Cavalry FC ===
On 23 January 2019, Pasquotti signed with Canadian Premier League side Cavalry FC, rejoining former Calgary Foothills coach Tommy Wheeldon Jr. and several of his Foothills teammates. On 8 May 2019, he made his professional debut as a substitute against Valour FC. Pasquotti scored his first goal for Cavalry on May 12 against Forge FC. Pasquotti's first season with Cavalry was quite personally successful despite his side losing to Forge in the 2019 Canadian Premier League Finals: he became a mainstay in the starting eleven, contributed 5 goals and 7 assists throughout all competitions, and became renowned for his dangerous long throw-ins.

After training with RCD Mallorca and Ross County in the offseason, he re-signed with Cavalry FC ahead of the 2020 season on January 29, 2020. In September 2020, Pasquotti would suffer a torn ACL in a match against Pacific FC, which would keep him out of action for 6–9 months.

== Career statistics ==
Club	Season	League			Cup		Playoffs		Total	
Club	Season	Division	Apps	Goals	Apps	Goals	Apps	Goals	Apps	Goals
Calgary Foothills	2016	PDL	12	1	-	-	5	2	17	3
Calgary Foothills	2017	PDL	13	0	-	-	1	0	14	0
Calgary Foothills	2018	PDL	13	3	-	-	4	1	17	4
Calgary Foothills	Total	PDL	38	4	0	0	10	3	48	7
Cavalry FC	2019	CPL	23	5	8	0	2	0	33	5
Cavalry FC	2020	CPL	7	0	-	-	1	0	8	0
Cavalry FC	Total	CPL	30	5	8	0	3	0	41	5
Total			68	9	8	0	13	3	89	12

== Honours ==
=== Club ===
Calgary Foothills

- PDL Championship: 2018

Calvary FC

- Canadian Premier League Finals
  - Runners-up: 2019
- Canadian Premier League (Regular season):
  - Champions: Spring 2019, Fall 2019

Individual

- PDL Championship MVP: 2018
