= Dean Northover =

Canadian soccer player

Personal information
- Full name: Dean Northover
- Date of birth: 4 September 1991 (age 35)
- Place of birth: Calgary, Alberta, Canada
- Height: 1.73 m (5 ft 8 in)
- Positions: Full-back; midfielder

College career
Years	Team	Apps	(Gls)
2017–2018	SAIT Trojans	24	(17)

Senior career*
Years	Team	Apps	(Gls)
2015–2018	Calgary Foothills	49	(0)
2019–2020	Cavalry FC	15	(0)
Total		64	(0)
- * Club domestic league appearances and goals

Dean Northover (born 4 September 1991) is a Canadian former professional soccer player who played as a full-back.

== Club career ==
=== Calgary Foothills ===
In 2015, Northover joined local club Calgary Foothills FC in their inaugural season in the Premier Development League. In 2016, Northover made fourteen league appearances and five playoff appearances for Calgary.

In 2017, Northover made another fourteen league appearances for Foothills while attending the Southern Alberta Institute of Technology, where he was named 2017–18 ACAC Men's Soccer Player of the Year. In 2018, Northover made nine league appearances for Calgary and four playoff appearances as the Foothills won the 2018 PDL Championship. Northover made more appearances in the PDL than any other player from 2015 to 2018.

=== Cavalry FC ===
On 23 January 2019 Northover signed with local Canadian Premier League side Cavalry FC, joining former Foothills coach Tommy Wheeldon Jr. and several of is former Foothills teammates. On 4 May 2019 he made his professional debut in the club's inaugural match against York9 FC. After starting regularly for Cavalry in the 2019 Spring season, Northover tore his ACL in July 2019, forcing him to miss the remainder of the 2019 season. Cavalry announced his return to the team on 3 August 2020.

On 26 January 2021, the club announced that Northover had retired at age 29 to pursue other career opportunities.

== Honours ==
Calgary Foothills

- PDL Championship: 2018

Cavalry FC

- Canadian Premier League Finals
  - Runners-up: 2019
- Canadian Premier League (Regular season):
  - Champions: Spring 2019, Fall 2019

Individual

- ACAC Men's Soccer Player of the Year: 2017
