= List of Canadian Premier League transfers 2020 =

This is a list of transfers for the 2020 Canadian Premier League season.

This list includes all transfers involving Canadian Premier League clubs after their last match of the 2019 Canadian Premier League season and before their last match of the 2020 season.

== Transfers ==
Clubs without a flag are Canadian.

Date	Name	Moving from	Moving to	Fee
31 October 2019	(Canada) Dylan Sacramento	Valour FC	(New Zealand) Hawke's Bay United	Loan
1 November 2019	(Canada) Calum Ferguson	Valour FC	(New Zealand) Canterbury United	Free
28 November 2019	(Morocco) Omar Kreim	Université de Montréal	HFX Wanderers	Free
28 November 2019	(Mali) Aboubacar Sissoko	Université de Montréal	HFX Wanderers	Free
3 December 2019	(Guinea) Ibrahima Sanoh	PEI FC	HFX Wanderers	Free
4 December 2019	(Canada) Hanson Boakai	(Finland) Inter Turku	FC Edmonton	Free
11 December 2019	(Canada) José Hernández	Pacific FC	Cavalry FC	Free
12 December 2019	(Germany) Peter Schaale	Cape Breton University	HFX Wanderers	Free
17 December 2019	(Canada) Chris Mannella	Ottawa Fury	York9	Free
18 December 2019	(Japan) Kodai Iida	HFX Wanderers	(United States) Oklahoma City Energy	Free
18 December 2019	(Canada) Alessandro Riggi	(United States) Phoenix Rising	HFX Wanderers	Free
21 December 2019	(Canada) Zachary Sukunda	HFX Wanderers	(Finland) Ekenäs IF	Free
30 December 2019	(Ghana) Solomon Kojo Antwi	(Ghana) Glow Lamp Academy	Valour FC	Free
30 December 2019	(Colombia) Luis Perea	HFX Wanderers	(Peru) Carlos Stein	Free
5 January 2020	(Germany) Hendrik Starostzik	Pacific FC	(Denmark) Næstved	Free
8 January 2020	(Canada) Louis Béland-Goyette	Valour FC	HFX Wanderers	Free
8 January 2020	(Peru) Juan Gutiérrez	HFX Wanderers	(Bolivia) Oriente Petrolero	Free
9 January 2020	(England) Adam Mitter	Valour FC	(Indonesia) Persiraja	Free
10 January 2020	(Northern Ireland) Daryl Fordyce	(Republic of Ireland) Sligo Rovers	Valour FC	Free
14 January 2020	(Haiti) Andrew Jean-Baptiste	(Sweden) Umeå FC	Valour FC	Free
14 January 2020	(Canada) Joel Waterman	Cavalry FC	Montreal Impact	Undisclosed
15 January 2020	(Canada) Daniel Kinumbe	Montreal Impact	HFX Wanderers	Free
21 January 2020	(Canada) Jamar Dixon	Ottawa Fury	Pacific FC	Free
21 January 2020	(Croatia) Josip Golubar	Valour FC	(Austria) Neuberg	Free
21 January 2020	(Canada) Thomas Meilleur-Giguère	Montreal Impact	Pacific FC	Free
21 January 2020	(Brazil) Gabriel Vasconcelos	(Brazil) Corinthians	York9	Free
22 January 2020	(Canada) Tristan Borges	Forge FC	(Belgium) OH Leuven	Undisclosed
22 January 2020	(Peru) Jair Córdova	(Peru) Alianza Universidad	Cavalry FC	Undisclosed
22 January 2020	(Canada) Mateo Restrepo	(United States) UC Santa Barbara	HFX Wanderers	Free
24 January 2020	(Canada) Fraser Aird	(Scotland) Cove Rangers	Valour FC	Free
24 January 2020	(Canada) Michael Petrasso	Valour FC	York9	Free
26 January 2020	(Canada) Dylan Sacramento	Valour FC	(Republic of Ireland) Galway United	Free
27 January 2020	(Saudi Arabia) Ahmed Alghamdi	Pacific FC	(Saudi Arabia) Al-Ettifaq	Free
29 January 2020	(Panama) Alexander González	Pacific FC	(Panama) San Miguelito	Free
29 January 2020	(Canada) Duran Lee	HFX Wanderers	FC Edmonton	Free
29 January 2020	(Jamaica) Alex Marshall	(Jamaica) Cavalier	HFX Wanderers	Free
30 January 2020	(Canada) Marco Bustos	Valour FC	Pacific FC	Free
30 January 2020	(Canada) Brett Levis	Vancouver Whitecaps	Valour FC	Free
31 January 2020	(Canada) Jordan Murrell	Valour FC	(United States) Las Vegas Lights	Free
1 February 2020	(Uruguay) Martín Arguiñarena	Valour FC	(Uruguay) Villa Teresa	Free
1 February 2020	(Germany) Julian Büscher	Cavalry FC	(Germany) TuS Haltern	Free
5 February 2020	(Canada) Bruno Zebie	FC Edmonton	Cavalry FC	Free
5 February 2020	(Sweden) Erik Zetterberg	(Sweden) Varbergs BoIS	FC Edmonton	Free
6 February 2020	(Canada) Jason Beaulieu	Montreal Impact	HFX Wanderers	Free
6 February 2020	(Mexico) Alejandro Díaz	(Mexico) América	Pacific FC	Free
7 February 2020	(Panama) Amir Soto	(Panama) Universitario	Valour FC	Free
10 February 2020	(Japan) Fugo Segawa	(Finland) AC Oulu	York9	Free
11 February 2020	(Chile) Rodrigo Gattas	York9	(Azerbaijan) Gabala	Free
12 February 2020	(Canada) Antony Caceres	Vancouver Whitecaps	FC Edmonton	Free
12 February 2020	(Canada) Chance Carter	Vancouver Whitecaps	FC Edmonton	Free
14 February 2020	(New Zealand) Moses Dyer	(Norway) Florø	Valour FC	Free
14 February 2020	(Jamaica) Nicholas Hamilton	(Jamaica) Cavalier	York9	Free
18 February 2020	(Canada) Matthew Arnone	HFX Wanderers	York9	Free
18 February 2020	(Haiti) Jems Geffrard	(United States) Fresno FC	HFX Wanderers	Free
19 February 2020	(Canada) Callum Irving	Ottawa Fury	Pacific FC	Free
19 February 2020	(Brazil) Richard Luca	(Mexico) UANL	Cavalry FC	Free
19 February 2020	(Peru) Raúl Tito	(Peru) Cienciano	FC Edmonton	Free
20 February 2020	(Canada) Tyler Attardo	Valour FC	(Chile) Fernández Vial	Undisclosed
21 February 2020	(Mali) Abdou Samake	(United States) University of Michigan	Pacific FC	Free
24 February 2020	(Peru) Adrián Ugarriza	(Peru) Alianza Lima	York9	Free
25 February 2020	(Brazil) João Morelli	(Estonia) Levadia Tallinn	HFX Wanderers	Free
25 February 2020	(Brazil) Eriks Santos	(Georgia (country)) Dila Gori	HFX Wanderers	Free
25 February 2020	(Canada) Skylar Thomas	Valour FC	(United States) Pittsburgh Riverhounds	Free
26 February 2020	(England) Elliot Simmons	HFX Wanderers	Cavalry FC	Free
27 February 2020	(Canada) Max Ferrari	Aurora FC	York9	Free
28 February 2020	(Sweden) Simon Adjei	York9	(Sweden) Assyriska IK	Free
28 February 2020	(Republic of the Congo) Arnold Bouka Moutou	(France) Dijon	Valour FC	Free
2 March 2020	(Canada) David Monsalve	Ottawa Fury	Forge FC	Free
4 March 2020	(Canada) Ben Fisk	Pacific FC	Atlético Ottawa	Free
4 March 2020	(Brazil) Jacó	(Brazil) Iporá	York9	Free
5 March 2020	(Canada) Antoine Coupland	Ottawa Fury	Atlético Ottawa	Free
5 March 2020	(Argentina) Brian López	(Argentina) Racing	York9	Free
6 March 2020	(Canada) Malyk Hamilton	Cavalry FC	Atlético Ottawa	Free
6 March 2020	(Republic of the Congo) Dominique Malonga	Cavalry FC	(Bulgaria) Lokomotiv Plovdiv	Free
6 March 2020	(Canada) James Pantemis	Montreal Impact	Valour FC	Loan
7 March 2020	(Canada) Émile Legault	Pacific FC	(United States) Rio Grande Valley FC	Free
9 March 2020	(Canada) Ajay Khabra	FC Edmonton	Atlético Ottawa	Free
10 March 2020	(Canada) Michel Djaozandry	St-Hubert	Atlético Ottawa	Free
10 March 2020	(Canada) Ricky Gomes	(Portugal) União Madeira	Atlético Ottawa	Free
11 March 2020	(Canada) Robert Boskovic	Toronto FC II	Cavalry FC	Loan
11 March 2020	(Canada) Kunle Dada-Luke	(Denmark) Helsingør	Atlético Ottawa	Free
23 March 2020	(Canada) Brandon John	(United States) Orlando City B	Atlético Ottawa	Free
24 March 2020	(Canada) Keven Alemán	(United States) Sacramento Republic	FC Edmonton	Free
24 March 2020	(England) Vashon Neufville	(England) West Ham United	Atlético Ottawa	Free
26 March 2020	(Jamaica) Tevin Shaw	(Jamaica) Portmore United	Atlético Ottawa	Free
30 March 2020	(Mexico) Francisco Acuña	(Mexico) Puebla	Atlético Ottawa	Free
1 April 2020	(Ghana) Bernardinho	(Belgium) Westerlo	Atlético Ottawa	Free
2 April 2020	(Spain) Nacho Zabal	(Spain) Calahorra	Atlético Ottawa	Free
3 April 2020	(Canada) Stefan Cebara	Unattached	Valour FC	Free
3 April 2020	(Algeria) Mastanabal Kacher	(United States) Saint Louis FC	Valour FC	Free
7 April 2020	(Spain) Viti Martínez	(Spain) Gimnàstic	Atlético Ottawa	Free
15 April 2020	(Canada) Mohamed Farsi	(Algeria) AS Aïn M'lila	Cavalry FC	Free
23 April 2020	(Belgium) Paolo Sabak	(Netherlands) NEC	Forge FC	Free
27 April 2020	(Canada) Ijah Halley	Toronto FC	York9	Free
4 May 2020	(England) Cory Bent	Cape Breton University	HFX Wanderers	Draft
12 May 2020	(Chinese Taipei) Emilio Estevez	York9	(Netherlands) ADO Den Haag	Undisclosed
13 May 2020	(Canada) Julian Altobelli	Toronto FC	York9	Free
3 June 2020	(Trinidad and Tobago) Ryan Telfer	(Cyprus) Nea Salamis	York9	Free
16 June 2020	(Canada) Matt Silva	York9	Valour FC	Free
24 June 2020	(Belgium) Oumar Diouck	FC Edmonton	(Iceland) Fjallabyggð	Free
25 June 2020	(Canada) Malcolm Shaw	(Sweden) Assyriska IK	Atlético Ottawa	Free
30 June 2020	(Canada) Emil Gazdov	Vancouver Whitecaps	Pacific FC	Free
6 July 2020	(Canada) Gianfranco Facchineri	Vancouver Whitecaps	Atlético Ottawa	Loan
6 July 2020	(Canada) Isaiah Johnston	Cape Breton University	York9	Draft
10 July 2020	(Canada) Ezequiel Carrasco	Kleinburg Nobleton	York9	Free
10 July 2020	(Canada) Austin Ricci	York9	Valour FC	Free
15 July 2020	(Canada) Jordan Haynes	University of British Columbia	Pacific FC	Free
17 July 2020	(Canada) Shaan Hundal	Toronto FC II	Valour FC	Free
18 July 2020	(Peru) Adrián Ugarriza	York9	(Peru) Cienciano	Free
20 July 2020	(Algeria) Chakib Hocine	HFX Wanderers	Valour FC	Free
21 July 2020	(Canada) Mauro Eustáquio	Cavalry FC	(Portugal) Caldas	Free
22 July 2020	(Canada) Maxim Tissot	Ottawa Fury	Forge FC	Free
23 July 2020	(Canada) Sean Young	Victoria Highlanders	Pacific FC	Free
27 July 2020	(Spain) Álvaro Rivero	(Spain) Leganés B	York9	Free
28 July 2020	(Canada) Lowell Wright	Woodbridge Strikers	York9	Free
31 July 2020	(Canada) Gabriel Balbinotti	UQTR	Forge FC	Draft
31 July 2020	(Canada) Matteo de Brienne	Vancouver Whitecaps	Atlético Ottawa	Free
31 July 2020	(Canada) Jordan Dunstan	(United States) Chattanooga FC	Forge FC	Free
31 July 2020	(Canada) Luke Green	Suburban FC	HFX Wanderers	Free
31 July 2020	(Canada) Marcus Haber	Pacific FC	Cavalry FC	Free
31 July 2020	(Wales) Josh Heard	(United States) Real Monarchs	Pacific FC	Free
31 July 2020	(Canada) Baj Maan	(United States) Northern Kentucky University	Forge FC	Free
31 July 2020	(Canada) David Monsalve	Forge FC	(Guatemala) Xelajú	Undisclosed
31 July 2020	(Canada) Jake Ruby	Trinity Western University	HFX Wanderers	Draft
3 August 2020	(Canada) Sam Gardner	Sigma FC	FC Edmonton	Free
3 August 2020	(Canada) Terique Mohammed	Toronto FC II	FC Edmonton	Loan
4 August 2020	(Canada) Molham Babouli	Unattached	Forge FC	Free
9 August 2020	(Canada) Jace Kotsopoulos	Forge FC	York9	Free
10 August 2020	(Canada) Dante Campbell	Toronto FC II	Valour FC	Loan
10 August 2020	(Canada) Julian Dunn	Toronto FC	Valour FC	Loan
10 August 2020	(Canada) Milovan Kapor	(Uzbekistan) Buxoro	Atlético Ottawa	Free
10 August 2020	(Guinea) Mohamed Kourouma	HFX Wanderers	Atlético Ottawa	Free
10 August 2020	(Canada) Maksym Kowal	Vaughan Azzurri	Atlético Ottawa	Free
10 August 2020	(Canada) Ben McKendry	(Sweden) Nyköping	Atlético Ottawa	Free
10 August 2020	(Canada) Jarred Phillips	Vaughan Azzurri	Atlético Ottawa	Free
10 August 2020	(Cameroon) Horace Sobze Zemo	Université Laval	Atlético Ottawa	Free
9 September 2020	(Honduras) José Escalante	Cavalry FC	(Honduras) Vida	Loan
