= List of Canadian Premier League transfers 2019 =

The following is a list of transfers related to the 2019 Canadian Premier League season. All transfers made during, or prior to the 2019 season are included here.

== Transfers ==
All clubs without a flag are members of the Canadian Premier League.

Date	Name	Moving from	Moving to	Fee
November 29, 2018	(Canada) Kyle Bekker	(United States) North Carolina FC	Forge FC	Free
November 29, 2018	(Canada) Sergio Camargo	(Canada) Calgary Foothills	Cavalry FC	Free
November 29, 2018	(Canada) Kadin Chung	(Germany) 1. FC Kaiserslautern II	Pacific FC	Free
November 29, 2018	(Canada) Randy Edwini-Bonsu	(Germany) Tennis Borussia Berlin	FC Edmonton	Free
November 29, 2018	(Canada) Nikolas Ledgerwood	(Canada) Calgary Foothills	Cavalry FC	Free
November 29, 2018	(Canada) Chris Nanco	(United States) Bethlehem Steel	Forge FC	Free
November 29, 2018	(Canada) Kyle Porter	(United States) Tampa Bay Rowdies	York9 FC	Free
November 29, 2018	(Canada) Zachary Sukunda	(Australia) Northcote City	HFX Wanderers	Free
November 29, 2018	(Canada) Skylar Thomas	(United States) Charleston Battery	Valour FC	Free
November 29, 2018	(Canada) Allan Zebie	Unattached	FC Edmonton	Free
December 3, 2018	(Sweden) Simon Adjei	(Sweden) Assyriska IK	York9 FC	Free
December 11, 2018 (Note: Stephen Hoyle joined Valour FC in late March, after the conclusion of his previous contract and the 2018–19 New Zealand Football Championship.)	(England) Stephen Hoyle	(New Zealand) Canterbury United	Valour FC	Free
December 12, 2018	(Canada) Elijah Adekugbe	(Canada) Calgary Foothills	Cavalry FC	Free
December 12, 2018	(Canada) Marco Carducci	(Canada) Calgary Foothills	Cavalry FC	Free
December 12, 2018	(Canada) Chris Serban	(Canada) Calgary Foothills	Cavalry FC	Free
December 12, 2018	(Canada) Dominick Zator	(Canada) Calgary Foothills	Cavalry FC	Free
December 13, 2018	(Canada) Ajay Khabra	(Canada) Edmonton Green & Gold	FC Edmonton	Free
December 13, 2018	(Canada) Ajeej Sarkaria	(Canada) Calgary Foothills	FC Edmonton	Draft
December 13, 2018	(South Korea) Son Yong-chan	(India) Ozone	FC Edmonton	Free
December 13, 2018	(Canada) Bruno Zebie	(Canada) Calgary Foothills	FC Edmonton	Free
December 14, 2018	(Canada) Tyson Farago	(Canada) WSA Winnipeg	Valour FC	Free
December 14, 2018	(Canada) Austin Ricci	(Canada) Vaughan Azzurri	York9 FC	Free
December 14, 2018	(Canada) Dylan Sacramento	(Canada) Vaughan Azzurri	Valour FC	Free
December 20, 2018	(Canada) Steven Furlano	(Canada) Alliance United	York9 FC	Free
January 7, 2019	(Canada) Joseph Di Chiara	(Lithuania) Jonava	York9 FC	Free
January 7, 2019	(Canada) Roger Thompson	(Sweden) Ljungskile SK	York9 FC	Free
January 8, 2019	(Canada) Glenn Muenkat	(Germany) 1. FC Kaiserslautern	Valour FC	Free
January 8, 2019	(Canada) Jordan Murrell	(United States) Reno 1868	Valour FC	Free
January 8, 2019	(Canada) Marcel Zajac	(United States) University of Akron	Forge FC	Free
January 9, 2019	(Canada) Marcus Haber	(Scotland) Dundee	Pacific FC	Free
January 10, 2019	(Canada) Tristan Borges	(Canada) Sigma FC	Forge FC	Free
January 10, 2019	(Trinidad and Tobago) Akeem Garcia	(Trinidad and Tobago) Santa Rosa	HFX Wanderers	Free
January 10, 2019	(Canada) Raphaël Garcia	(Canada) Montreal Impact	Valour FC	Free
January 10, 2019	(Trinidad and Tobago) Elton John	(Trinidad and Tobago) San Juan Jabloteh	HFX Wanderers	Free
January 10, 2019	(Ghana) Raphael Ohin	(Canada) WSA Winnipeg	Valour FC	Free
January 10, 2019	(Trinidad and Tobago) Andre Rampersad	(Trinidad and Tobago) Santa Rosa	HFX Wanderers	Free
January 10, 2019	(Trinidad and Tobago) Jan-Michael Williams	(Guatemala) Sacachispas	HFX Wanderers	Free
January 14, 2019	(Canada) Manny Aparicio	(Spain) San Roque	York9 FC	Free
January 15, 2019	(Canada) Matthew Baldisimo	(United States) Fresno FC	Pacific FC	Free
January 15, 2019	(Canada) Terran Campbell	(United States) Fresno FC	Pacific FC	Free
January 15, 2019	(Canada) Alessandro Hojabrpour	(Bulgaria) Lokomotiv Plovdiv	Pacific FC	Free
January 16, 2019	(Canada) Chakib Hocine	(Finland) Ekenäs	HFX Wanderers	Free
January 16, 2019	(Brazil) Oliver	(Australia) South Melbourne	Cavalry FC	Free
January 17, 2019	(Canada) Connor James	(Canada) University of Alberta	FC Edmonton	Draft
January 17, 2019	(Cameroon) Bertrand Owundi	(United States) Minnesota United	Forge FC	Free
January 17, 2019	(Canada) Dylon Powley	(Sweden) Gute	FC Edmonton	Free
January 17, 2019	(Canada) Cyrus Rollocks	(Canada) Master's Futbol	York9 FC	Free
January 21, 2019	(Canada) Noah Verhoeven	(United States) Fresno FC	Pacific FC	Free
January 21, 2019	(Canada) Mark Village	(United States) FC Cincinnati	Pacific FC	Free
January 22, 2019	(Canada) Vincent Lamy	(Canada) Montreal Impact	HFX Wanderers	Free
January 22, 2019	(Japan) Wataru Murofushi	(Singapore) Albirex Niigata (S)	York9 FC	Free
January 22, 2019	(Canada) Elliot Simmons	(Sweden) Dalkurd	HFX Wanderers	Free
January 23, 2019	(Canada) Niko Giantsopoulos	(Australia) Launceston City	Cavalry FC	Free
January 23, 2019	(Canada) Dean Northover	(Canada) Calgary Foothills	Cavalry FC	Free
January 23, 2019	(Canada) Nico Pasquotti	(Canada) Calgary Foothills	Cavalry FC	Free
January 23, 2019	(Colombia) Carlos Patiño	(Canada) Calgary Foothills	Cavalry FC	Free
January 28, 2019	(Canada) Tyler Attardo	(Canada) Winnipeg Phoenix FC	Valour FC	Free
January 28, 2019	(Canada) Dylan Carreiro	(Canada) York University	Valour FC	Draft
January 29, 2019	(Canada) Kwame Awuah	(United States) New York City FC	Forge FC	Free
January 30, 2019	(England) Jordan Brown	(Czech Republic) Znojmo	Cavalry FC	Free
January 30, 2019	(Canada) Scott Firth	(Canada) Suburban FC	HFX Wanderers	Free
January 31, 2019	(Sweden) Alexander Achinioti-Jönsson	(Sweden) IFK Värnamo	Forge FC	Free
January 31, 2019	(England) Tomi Ameobi	(United States) FC Cincinnati	FC Edmonton	Free
January 31, 2019	(Belgium) Oumar Diouck	(Belgium) Tienen	FC Edmonton	Free
January 31, 2019	(Belgium) Mathias Janssens	(Belgium) La Louvière	Valour FC	Free
January 31, 2019	(Ghana) Edem Mortotsi	Unattached	FC Edmonton	Free
January 31, 2019	(Trinidad and Tobago) Kareem Moses	(Finland) FF Jaro	FC Edmonton	Free
January 31, 2019	(Spain) Ramón Soria	(Spain) Formentera	FC Edmonton	Free
February 1, 2019	(Canada) Michael Cox	(United States) Saint Louis FC	York9 FC	Free
February 1, 2019	(Canada) Munir Saleh	(United States) University of Connecticut	York9 FC	Free
February 1, 2019	(Canada) Matt Silva	(Sweden) Österlens FF	York9 FC	Free
February 4, 2019	(Canada) Daniel Gogarty	(Canada) York University	York9 FC	Draft
February 5, 2019	(Canada) Ndzemdzela Langwa	(Spain) Socuéllamos	HFX Wanderers	Free
February 5, 2019	(Canada) Chrisnovic N'sa	(Canada) Montreal Impact	HFX Wanderers	Free
February 6, 2019	(Canada) Joel Waterman	(Canada) Trinity Western University	Cavalry FC	Draft
February 7, 2019	(Spain) Víctor Blasco	(Canada) CCB LFC United	Pacific FC	Free
February 7, 2019	(Canada) Ben Fisk	(Northern Ireland) Derry City	Pacific FC	Free
February 7, 2019	(Canada) Giuliano Frano	(Canada) Sigma FC	Forge FC	Free
February 7, 2019	(Canada) José Hernández	(Canada) Vancouver Whitecaps FC	Pacific FC	Free
February 8, 2019	(Canada) Morey Doner	(Canada) Aurora United	York9 FC	Free
February 8, 2019	(Canada) Emilio Estevez	(Canada) North Mississauga SC	York9 FC	Free
February 8, 2019	(Saint Kitts and Nevis) Justin Springer	(Canada) Vaughan Azzurri	York9 FC	Free
February 13, 2019	(Germany) Julian Büscher	(United States) LA Galaxy II	Cavalry FC	Free
February 14, 2019	(Canada) Luca Gasparotto	(Scotland) Greenock Morton	York9 FC	Free
February 14, 2019	(Croatia) Josip Golubar	(Croatia) Varaždin	Valour FC	Free
February 19, 2019	(Canada) Marcel de Jong	(Canada) Vancouver Whitecaps FC	Pacific FC	Free
February 20, 2019	(Canada) Alex De Carolis	(Sweden) Umeå FC	HFX Wanderers	Free
February 20, 2019	(England) Nathan Mavila	(England) Dulwich Hamlet	Cavalry FC	Free
February 20, 2019	(Canada) Christian Oxner	(Canada) Saint Mary's University	HFX Wanderers	Draft
February 21, 2019	(Japan) Kodai Iida	(United States) Washington Premier FC	HFX Wanderers	Free
February 21, 2019	(Ivory Coast) Kouamé Ouattara	(Canada) Dieppe	HFX Wanderers	Free
February 22, 2019	(Canada) Diyaeddine Abzi	(Canada) Blainville	York9 FC	Free
February 22, 2019	(Cameroon) Jeannot Esua	(Cameroon) Rainbow Bamenda	FC Edmonton	Free
February 22, 2019	(Haiti) James Marcelin	(United States) Miami United	FC Edmonton	Free
February 25, 2019	(Uruguay) Martín Arguiñarena	(Uruguay) Boston River	Valour FC	Free
February 25, 2019	(Peru) Juan Gutiérrez	(Peru) Sport Rosario	HFX Wanderers	Free
February 25, 2019	(Canada) Triston Henry	(Canada) Sigma FC	Forge FC	Free
February 25, 2019	(Colombia) Luis Perea	(Colombia) La Equidad	HFX Wanderers	Free
February 25, 2019	(Canada) Dominic Samuel	(Canada) Sigma FC	Forge FC	Free
February 26, 2019	(Senegal) Elimane Cissé	(Senegal) Diambars	Forge FC	Free
February 26, 2019	(Colombia) Nicolás Galvis	Unattached	Valour FC	Free
February 26, 2019	(Canada) Jonathan Grant	(Sweden) Nyköpings BIS	Forge FC	Free
February 26, 2019	(Canada) Philippe Lincourt-Joseph	(Oman) Al-Rustaq	FC Edmonton	Free
February 26, 2019	(Colombia) Néstor Navia	(Colombia) Deportivo Pasto	Valour FC	Free
February 26, 2019	(Germany) Mélé Temguia	(Australia) Valentine Phoenix	FC Edmonton	Free
February 26, 2019	(Canada) Nolan Wirth	(Canada) Victoria Highlanders	Pacific FC	Free
February 27, 2019	(Canada) Mason Trafford	(United States) Miami FC	Cavalry FC	Free
February 28, 2019	(Canada) Ali Musse	(Canada) Calgary Foothills	Valour FC	Free
March 2, 2019	(Belgium) Daniël Krutzen	(United States) University at Albany	Forge FC	Free
March 2, 2019	(Canada) Monti Mohsen	(Canada) Sigma FC	Forge FC	Free
March 2, 2019	(Guyana) Quillan Roberts	(United States) Los Angeles FC	Forge FC	Free
March 2, 2019	(Canada) Kadell Thomas	(Canada) Sigma FC	Forge FC	Free
March 4, 2019	(Canada) Diego Gutiérrez	(Chile) Palestino	Valour FC	Free
March 5, 2019	(Canada) Issey Nakajima-Farran	(Malaysia) Pahang	Pacific FC	Free
March 6, 2019	(Canada) Malyk Hamilton	(Canada) Toronto FC II	Cavalry FC	Free
March 6, 2019	(Canada) Ryan Telfer	(Canada) Toronto FC	York9 FC	Loan
March 7, 2019	(Canada) David Choinière	(Canada) Montreal Impact	Forge FC	Free
March 7, 2019	(Belgium) Lukas MacNaughton	(Canada) Alliance United	Pacific FC	Free
March 7, 2019	(Germany) Hendrik Starostzik	(Germany) Hallescher FC	Pacific FC	Free
March 8, 2019	(Canada) Colm Vance	(Canada) Vaughan Azzurri	York9 FC	Free
March 8, 2019	(Guyana) Emery Welshman	(United States) FC Cincinnati	Forge FC	Loan
March 13, 2019	(England) Jonathan Wheeldon	(Canada) Calgary Foothills	Cavalry FC	Free
March 18, 2019	(Canada) Michael Petrasso	(Canada) Montreal Impact	Valour FC	Free
March 20, 2019	(Canada) Mauro Eustáquio	(United States) Penn FC	Cavalry FC	Free
March 27, 2019	(Republic of the Congo) Dominique Malonga	(Greece) Chania	Cavalry FC	Free
March 29, 2019	(France) André Bona	(Canada) UQAM	HFX Wanderers	Draft
March 29, 2019	(Germany) Peter Schaale	(Canada) Cape Breton University	HFX Wanderers	Draft
April 3, 2019	(Canada) Klaidi Cela	(Canada) Sigma FC	Forge FC	Free
April 3, 2019	(Canada) Calum Ferguson	(Scotland) Elgin City	Valour FC	Free
April 3, 2019	(Colombia) Néstor Navia	Valour FC	Unattached	Free
April 3, 2019	(Canada) Anthony Novak	(Canada) Oakville Blue Devils	Forge FC	Free
April 3, 2019	(Trinidad and Tobago) Federico Peña	(Belgium) Standard Liège	Valour FC	Free
April 4, 2019	(Guinea) Mohamed Kourouma	(United States) Miami City	HFX Wanderers	Free
April 4, 2019	(Somalia) Abd-El-Aziz Yousef	(Netherlands) Cambuur	HFX Wanderers	Free
April 8, 2019	(Canada) Nathan Ingham	(United States) Pittsburgh Riverhounds SC	York9 FC	Free
April 8, 2019	(United States) Blake Smith	(United States) FC Cincinnati	Pacific FC	Loan
April 9, 2019	(Canada) Louis Béland-Goyette	(Canada) Montreal Impact	Valour FC	Free
April 9, 2019	(Canada) Tomasz Skublak	(United States) University of South Florida	HFX Wanderers	Free
April 10, 2019	(Honduras) José Escalante	(Honduras) Juticalpa	Cavalry FC	Free
April 12, 2019	(England) Adam Mitter	(Philippines) Global Cebu	Valour FC	Free
April 15, 2019	(Canada) Amer Đidić	(United States) San Antonio FC	FC Edmonton	Free
April 17, 2019	(Canada) Victor Loturi	(Canada) Calgary Foothills	Cavalry FC	Free
April 17, 2019	(Northern Ireland) Ryan McCurdy	(Canada) Vancouver Island University	Pacific FC	Free
April 24, 2019	(Canada) Gabriel Bitar	(Canada) Carleton University	Cavalry FC	Draft
April 24, 2019	(Canada) Emmanuel Zambazis	(Canada) York University	York9 FC	Draft
April 25, 2019	(Canada) Émile Legault	(France) Auxerre	Pacific FC	Free
April 26, 2019	(Chile) Rodrigo Gattas	(Chile) Santa Cruz	York9 FC	Free
April 27, 2019	(Canada) Zach Verhoven	(Canada) University of British Columbia	Pacific FC	Draft
April 28, 2019	(Venezuela) José Piña	Unattached	York9 FC	Free
May 1, 2019	(Saudi Arabia) Ahmed Alghamdi	(Canada) Rino's Tigers	Pacific FC	Free
May 1, 2019	(Canada) Matthew Arnone	(Canada) Vaughan Azzurri	HFX Wanderers	Free
May 1, 2019	(Canada) Easton Ongaro	(Canada) University of Alberta	FC Edmonton	Free
May 7, 2019	(Canada) Marco Bustos	(United States) Oklahoma City Energy	Valour FC	Free
May 16, 2019	(Canada) Jace Kotsopoulos	(Canada) University of Guelph	Forge FC	Draft
May 17, 2019	(Panama) Alexander González	(Panama) Plaza Amador	Pacific FC	Free
May 30, 2019	(Canada) Tyrone Venhola	(Canada) Victoria Highlanders	Pacific FC	Loan (Note: Emergency injury replacement for Nolan Wirth.)
June 11, 2019	(Canada) Baj Maan	(Canada) Sigma FC	Forge FC	Free
July 9, 2019	(England) Stephen Hoyle	Valour FC	Unattached	Free
July 15, 2019	(Spain) José Galán	(Saudi Arabia) Al-Jalabain	Valour FC	Free
July 16, 2019	(Italy) Michele Paolucci	(Malta) Tarxien Rainbows	Valour FC	Free
July 27, 2019	(Canada) Stefan Lamanna	(Iceland) Tindastóll	York9 FC	Free
August 2, 2019	(Canada) David Edgar	(England) Hartlepool United	Forge FC	Free
August 7, 2019	(Cameroon) Tony Tchani	Unattached	FC Edmonton	Free
August 9, 2019	(Canada) Yohan Le Bourhis	(Canada) Blainville	Valour FC	Free
August 9, 2019	(Canada) Aribim Pepple	(Canada) Calgary Foothills	Cavalry FC	Free
August 11, 2019	(Germany) Peter Schaale	HFX Wanderers	(Canada) Cape Breton University	Free
August 13, 2019	(Canada) Duran Lee	(Canada) Vaughan Azzurri	HFX Wanderers	Free
August 28, 2019	(Canada) Tofa Fakunle	(Canada) Calgary Foothills	Cavalry FC	Free
September 3, 2019	(Canada) David Norman Jr.	(Canada) Vancouver Whitecaps FC	Pacific FC	Loan
September 4, 2019	(Canada) Luke Iacobellis	(Canada) Sigma FC	Forge FC	Free
September 15, 2019	(Canada) Oluwaseun Oyegunle	(Canada) Sigma FC	Forge FC	Free
September 15, 2019	(Canada) Justin Stoddart	(Canada) Sigma FC	Forge FC	Free
