= Vashon =

Vashon may refer to:

== Places ==
- Vashon Island, an island in Puget Sound.
- Vashon Municipal Airport on Vashon Island.
- Vashon High School, a high school in St. Louis, Missouri
- Vashon, Washington, the community on Vashon Island.
- Vashon-Maury Island Community Council, representatives of Vashon and Maury Islands to the King County Council, Washington.

== People ==
=== Given name ===
- Vashone Adams (born 1973), American football player
- Vashon Eagleson, American football coach
- Vashon Neufville (born 1999), English footballer
- Vashon James Wheeler (1898–1944), British airman during World War II

=== Surname ===
- George Boyer Vashon (1824–1878), American scholar, poet and abolitionist
- James Vashon (1742–1827), British naval officer and namesake of Vashon Island
- Mary Frances Vashon (1818–1854), American journalist and abolitionist
- Susan Paul Vashon (1838–1912), American educator, abolitionist, and clubwoman

== Other ==
- Vashon, a commercial vessel acquired by the U.S. Navy during World War II
- Vashon Glaciation during the Pleistocene
- Vashon (steamboat 1905)

== See also ==
- Vashan (disambiguation), various places in Iran and Tajikistan
