= 2020 Atlético Ottawa season =

Atlético Ottawa
2020 season
- CEO: Fernando Lopez
- Head coach: Mista
- Stadium: Alumni Field, UPEI; Charlottetown, Prince Edward island
- Canadian Premier League: 7th
- Canadian Championship: Did not qualify
- Top goalscorer: Francisco Acuña; Malcolm Shaw (2 goals each)
- Biggest win: 2–0 vs. Cavalry FC (August 27)
- Biggest defeat: 0–4 vs. Valour FC (August 19)
Home colours	Away colours

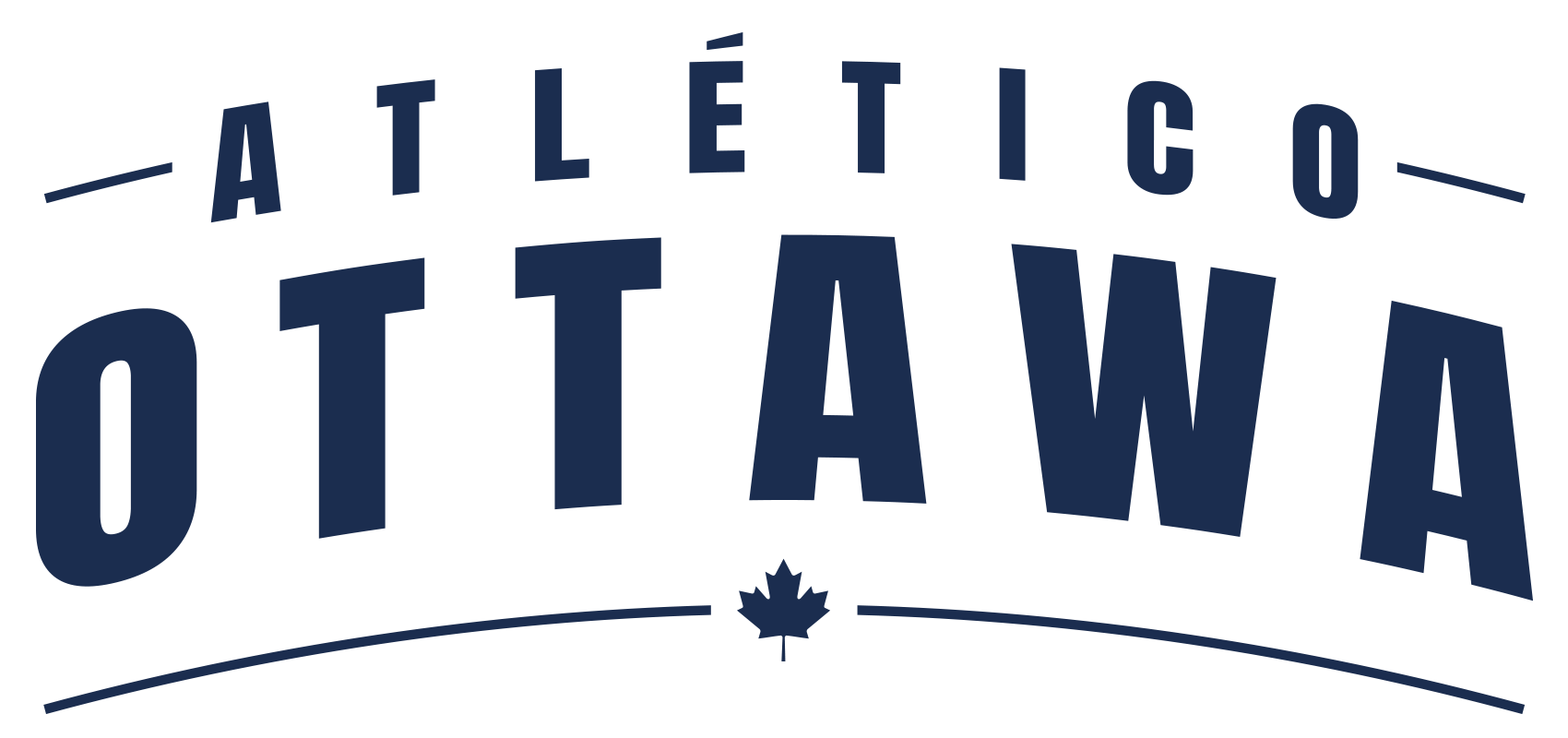
Atlético Ottawa wordmark

The 2020 Atlético Ottawa season was the first season in the history of Atlético Ottawa.

It was announced on January 29, 2020, that Atlético Madrid had gained the approval of the Canadian Premier League to form an expansion club in the city of Ottawa, Ontario.

On March 20, 2020, the league announced a postponement of the start of the season due to the COVID-19 pandemic. On July 29, 2020, the league announced that the season would be played in Charlottetown, Prince Edward Island, beginning August 13, in an event dubbed "The Island Games."

== Current squad ==
As of August 13, 2020

No.	Name	Nationality	Position(s)	Date of birth (age)	Previous club
Goalkeepers
1	Nacho Zabal	(Spain)	GK	February 14, 1987 (aged 33)	(Spain) CD Calahorra
25	Ricky Gomes	(Canada)	GK	June 19, 1993 (aged 27)	(Portugal) União da Madeira
30	Horace Sobze Zemo	(Cameroon)	GK	May 17, 1993 (aged 27)	(Canada) Ottawa South United
Defenders
2	Malyk Hamilton	(Canada)	RB / RW	September 2, 1999 (aged 21)	(Canada) Cavalry FC
3	Milovan Kapor	(Canada)	CB / DM	August 5, 1991 (aged 29)	(Uzbekistan) FK Buxoro
4	Brandon John	(Canada)	CB	January 5, 1995 (aged 25)	(United States) Orlando City B
6	Gianfranco Facchineri	(Canada)	CB	April 27, 2002 (aged 18)	(Canada) Vancouver Whitecaps
12	Michel Djaozandry	(Canada)	FB / RW / LW	February 17, 1998 (aged 22)	(Canada) Montreal Impact Academy
13	Kunle Dada-Luke (Note: Player signed, but was not added to the 2020 roster because of injury)	(Canada)	FB / RW	January 12, 2000 (aged 20)	(Denmark) Helsingør
14	Jarred Phillips	(Canada)	FB	May 14, 1995 (aged 25)	(Canada) Vaughan Azzurri
44	Vashon Neufville	(England)	LB	July 18, 1999 (aged 21)	(Wales) Newport County
Midfielders
5	Viti Martínez	(Spain)	CM	May 25, 1997 (aged 23)	(Spain) Gimnàstic
7	Bernardinho (Note: Player signed, but was not added to the 2020 roster because of difficulties getting into Canada due to the COVID-19 pandemic)	(Ghana)	AM / RW / LW	July 2, 1996 (aged 24)	(Belgium) Heist
8	Francisco Acuña	(Mexico)	AM / RW / LW	January 19, 1988 (aged 32)	(Mexico) Puebla
9	Mohamed Kourouma	(Guinea)	LW	August 4, 1990 (aged 30)	(Canada) HFX Wanderers
10	Ben Fisk	(Canada)	RW / LW	February 4, 1993 (aged 27)	(Canada) Pacific FC
11	Antoine Coupland	(Canada)	MF	December 12, 2003 (aged 17)	(Canada) Ottawa Fury FC
18	Tevin Shaw	(Jamaica)	DM	February 24, 1997 (aged 23)	(Jamaica) Portmore United
22	Ben McKendry	(Canada)	CM / AM	March 25, 1993 (aged 27)	(Sweden) Nyköpings BIS
23	Ajay Khabra	(Canada)	CM	June 13, 1995 (aged 25)	(Canada) FC Edmonton
42	Matteo de Brienne	(Canada)	LW	May 22, 2002 (aged 18)	(Canada) Vancouver Whitecaps
Forwards
19	Malcolm Shaw	(Canada)	CF	July 27, 1995 (aged 25)	(Sweden) Assyriska IK
21	Maksym Kowal	(Canada)	CF	June 4, 1991 (aged 29)	(Canada) Vaughan Azzurri

== Transfers ==
=== In ===
No.	Pos.	Player	Transferred from	Fee/notes	Date	Source
10	MF	(Canada) Ben Fisk	(Canada) Pacific FC	Free transfer	March 4, 2020	
11	MF	(Canada) Antoine Coupland	(Canada) Ottawa Fury FC	Free transfer	March 5, 2020	
2	MF	(Canada) Malyk Hamilton	(Canada) Cavalry FC	Free transfer	March 6, 2020	
23	MF	(Canada) Ajay Khabra	(Canada) FC Edmonton	Free transfer	March 9, 2020	
25	GK	(Canada) Ricky Gomes	(Portugal) União da Madeira	Free transfer	March 10, 2020	
12	DF/MF	(Canada) Michel Djaozandry	(Canada) Montreal Impact Academy	Free transfer	March 10, 2020	
13	DF/MF	(Canada) Kunle Dada-Luke	(Denmark) Helsingør	Free transfer	March 11, 2020	
4	DF	(Canada) Brandon John	(United States) Orlando City B	Free transfer	March 23, 2020	
44	DF	(England) Vashon Neufville	(England) West Ham United	Free transfer	March 24, 2020	
18	MF	(Jamaica) Tevin Shaw	(Jamaica) Portmore United	Free transfer	March 26, 2020	
8	MF	(Mexico) Francisco Acuña	(Mexico) Puebla	Free transfer	March 30, 2020	
7	MF	(Ghana) Bernardinho	(Belgium) Westerlo	Free transfer	April 1, 2020	
1	GK	(Spain) Nacho Zabal	(Spain) CD Calahorra	Free transfer	April 2, 2020	
5	MF	(Spain) Viti Martínez	(Spain) Gimnàstic	Free transfer	April 7, 2020	
19	FW	(Canada) Malcolm Shaw	(Sweden) Assyriska IK	Free transfer	June 25, 2020	
42	FW	(Canada) Matteo de Brienne	(Canada) Vancouver Whitecaps	Free transfer	July 31, 2020	
9	MF	(Guinea) Mohamed Kourouma	(Canada) HFX Wanderers	Free transfer	August 10, 2020	
21	FW	(Canada) Maksym Kowal	(Canada) Vaughan Azzurri	Free transfer	August 10, 2020	
22	MF	(Canada) Ben McKendry	(Sweden) Nyköpings BIS	Free transfer	August 10, 2020	
14	DF	(Canada) Jarred Phillips	(Canada) Vaughan Azzurri	Free transfer	August 10, 2020	
3	DF	(Canada) Milovan Kapor	(Uzbekistan) FK Buxoro	Free transfer	August 10, 2020	
30	GK	(Cameroon) Horace Sobze Zemo	(Canada) Ottawa South United	Free transfer	August 10, 2020	

==== Loan In ====
No.	Pos.	Player	Loaned from	Fee/notes	Date	Source
6	DF	(Canada) Gianfranco Facchineri	(Canada) Vancouver Whitecaps	Loaned until September 30, 2020	July 6, 2020	

=== Out ===
==== Loans out ====
No.	Pos.	Player	Loaned to	Fee/notes	Date	Source
5	MF	(Spain) Viti Martínez	(Spain) Deportivo Alavés B	Loaned until March 2021	October 7, 2020	

== Canadian Premier League ==
=== First stage ===
==== Table ====
Pos	Team	Pld	W	D	L	GF	GA	GD	Pts	Qualification
1	Cavalry	7	4	1	2	10	7	+3	13	Advance to group stage
2	HFX Wanderers	7	3	3	1	12	7	+5	12 (Note: Head-to-head points: HFX Wanderers 1, Forge 1. Goal differential: HFX Wanderers +5, Forge +4)	Advance to group stage
3	Forge	7	3	3	1	13	9	+4	12	Advance to group stage
4	Pacific	7	3	2	2	10	8	+2	11	Advance to group stage
5	York9	7	2	4	1	8	7	+1	10	
6	Valour	7	2	2	3	8	9	−1	8 (Note: Head-to-head points: Valour 3, Atlético Ottawa 0.)	
7	Atlético Ottawa	7	2	2	3	7	12	−5	8	
8	FC Edmonton	7	0	1	6	5	14	−9	1	

Source: CanPL.ca
Rules for classification: 1) points; 2) head-to-head points; 3) goal differential; 4) goals for; 5) total wins; 6) U-21 minutes; 7) coin toss or drawing of lots.

==== Results by match ====
Match	1	2	3	4	5	6	7
Result	D	L	D	W	L	W	L
Position	3	7	7	6	7	5	7

Updated to match(es) played on September 3, 2020. Source: #Matches
W = Win; D = Draw; L = Loss

==== Matches ====
August 15 1	York9 FC	2–2	Atlético Ottawa	Charlottetown, Prince Edward Island
12:00pm	Di Chiara (yellow card) 14' (goal) 62' (pen.); Wright 60'		Neufville (yellow card) 14' (yellow-red card) 50'; Kourouma 45+3'; Shaw 47'	Stadium: Alumni Field; Referee: Mathieu Souaré

August 19 2	Atlético Ottawa	0–4	Valour FC	Charlottetown, Prince Edward Island
1:00pm	Kapor (yellow card) 8' (yellow-red card) 64'; Viti (yellow card) 29'	Report	Aird (yellow card) 4' (goal) 65' (pen.); Ricci (yellow card) 29'; Jean-Baptiste 78'; Kacher (yellow card) 81'; Carreiro 90'; Galán 90+1'	Stadium: Alumni Field; Referee: Filip Dujic

August 23 3	Atlético Ottawa	2–2	FC Edmonton	Charlottetown, Prince Edward Island
1:00pm	Acuña 1', 15'; Coupland (yellow card) 41'; Fisk (yellow card) 43'; Kourouma (yellow card) 48'	Report	Alemán (yellow card) 20' (goal) 88'; Gardner (yellow card) 68'; Ongaro 90+1'	Stadium: Alumni Field; Referee: Myriam Marcotte

August 27 4	Atlético Ottawa	2–0	Cavalry FC	Charlottetown, Prince Edward Island
3:00pm	John (yellow card) 32'; Acuña (yellow card) 45+3'; Fisk 61'; Shaw 64'	Report		Stadium: Alumni Field; Referee: Myriam Marcotte

August 30 5	Atlético Ottawa	0–2	Forge FC	Charlottetown, Prince Edward Island
3:00pm	Khabra (yellow card) 39'; John (yellow card) 86'	Report	Krutzen 35'; Thomas (yellow card) 65'; Choinière 89'	Stadium: Alumni Field; Referee: Carly Shaw-MacLaren

September 2 6	Pacific FC	0–1	Atlético Ottawa	Charlottetown, Prince Edward Island
8:00pm	Blasco (yellow card) 85'; Bustos (yellow card) 92'	Report	McKendry (yellow card) 47'; Kapor (yellow card) 49'; Acuña (yellow card) 55'; Viti (yellow card) 63', (goal) 90'	Stadium: Alumni Field; Referee: Mathieu Souaré

September 6 7	HFX Wanderers FC	2–0	Atlético Ottawa	Charlottetown, Prince Edward Island
12:00pm	Garcia 15'; Riggi 60'; Béland-Goyette (yellow card) 81'	Report	McKendry (yellow card) 45+1'	Stadium: Alumni Field; Referee: Yusri Rudolf

== Statistics ==
=== Squad and statistics ===
As of September 6, 2020

No.	Pos	Nat	Player	Total		Canadian Premier League	
No.	Pos	Nat	Player	Apps	Goals	Apps	Goals
1	GK	(Spain) ESP	Nacho Zabal	7	0	7+0	0
2	MF	(Canada) CAN	Malyk Hamilton	7	0	7+0	0
3	DF	(Canada) CAN	Milovan Kapor	6	0	6+0	0
4	DF	(Canada) CAN	Brandon John	7	0	7+0	0
5	MF	(Spain) ESP	Viti Martínez	6	1	6+0	1
6	DF	(Canada) CAN	Gianfranco Facchineri	5	0	2+3	0
8	MF	(Mexico) MEX	Francisco Acuña	7	2	7+0	2
9	FW	(Guinea) GUI	Mohamed Kourouma	7	1	7+0	1
10	MF	(Canada) CAN	Ben Fisk	7	1	7+0	1
11	MF	(Canada) CAN	Antoine Coupland	3	0	0+3	0
12	DF	(Canada) CAN	Michel Djaozandry	1	0	0+1	0
14	DF	(Canada) CAN	Jarred Phillips	5	0	2+3	0
19	FW	(Canada) CAN	Malcolm Shaw	7	2	7+0	2
21	FW	(Canada) CAN	Maksym Kowal	3	0	0+3	0
22	MF	(Canada) CAN	Ben McKendry	7	0	4+3	0
23	MF	(Canada) CAN	Ajay Khabra	6	0	4+2	0
25	GK	(Canada) CAN	Ricky Gomes	0	0	0+0	0
30	GK	(Cameroon) CMR	Horace Sobze Zemo	0	0	0+0	0
42	FW	(Canada) CAN	Matteo de Brienne	0	0	0+0	0
44	DF	(England) ENG	Vashon Neufville	5	0	3+2	0

=== Top scorers ===
Rank	Nat.	Player	Pos.	Canadian Premier League	TOTAL
1	(Mexico)	Francisco Acuña	MF	2	2
1	(Canada)	Malcolm Shaw	FW	2	2
3	(Guinea)	Mohamed Kourouma	MF	1	1
3	(Canada)	Ben Fisk	MF	1	1
3	(Spain)	Viti Martínez	MF	1	1
Totals				7	7

Updated to match played September 6, 2020
Source: Canadian Premier League

=== Top assists ===
Rank	Nat.	Player	Pos.	Canadian Premier League	TOTAL
1	(Mexico)	Francisco Acuña	MF	2	2
2	(Canada)	Malyk Hamilton	MF	1	1
2	(England)	Vashon Neufville	DF	1	1
2	(Canada)	Malcolm Shaw	FW	1	1
Totals				5	5

Updated to match played September 6, 2020
Source: Canadian Premier League

=== Clean sheets ===
Rank	Nat.	Player	Canadian Premier League	TOTAL
1	(Spain)	Nacho Zabal	2	2
Totals			2	2

Updated to match played September 6, 2020
Source: Canadian Premier League

=== Disciplinary record ===
No.	Pos.	Nat.	Player	Canadian Premier League		TOTAL	
No.	Pos.	Nat.	Player	Booked	Sent off (straight red)	Booked	Sent off (straight red)
3	DF	(Canada)	Milovan Kapor	1	1	1	1
4	DF	(Canada)	Brandon John	1	0	1	0
5	MF	(Spain)	Viti Martínez	2	0	2	0
8	MF	(Mexico)	Francisco Acuña	1	0	1	0
9	FW	(Guinea)	Mohamed Kourouma	1	0	1	0
10	MF	(Canada)	Ben Fisk	1	0	1	0
11	MF	(Canada)	Antoine Coupland	1	0	1	0
22	MF	(Canada)	Ben McKendry	2	0	2	0
23	DF	(Canada)	Ajay Khabra	1	0	1	0
44	DF	(England)	Vashon Neufville	0	1	0	1
Totals				11	2	11	2

Updated to match played September 6, 2020
Source: Canadian Premier League
