= Gabriel Vasconcelos =

Gabriel Vasconcelos may refer to:

- Gabriel Vasconcelos (footballer, born 1996), Brazilian football forward
- Gabriel (footballer, born 1992) (Gabriel Vasconcelos Ferreira), Brazilian football goalkeeper
