= 2020 Canadian Premier League season =

Professional soccer league season

Canadian Premier League
- Season: 2020
- Dates: August 13 – September 6, 2020 (first stage); September 9–15, 2020 (group stage); September 19, 2020 (final)
- Champions: Forge FC (2nd title)
- CPL Shield: not awarded
- CONCACAF League: Forge FC
- Matches: 35
- Goals: 92 (2.63 per match)
- Top goalscorer: Akeem Garcia (6 goals)
- Best goalkeeper: Triston Henry (5 shutouts)
- Biggest home win: HFX Wanderers 0–5 Pacific FC (September 15)
- Highest scoring: 5 goals York9 FC 3–2 Forge FC (August 26); HFX Wanderers 0–5 Pacific FC (September 15)
- Longest winning run: 3 matches Cavalry FC (August 16–23); Forge FC (September 12–19)
- Longest unbeaten run: 6 matches York9 FC (August 15 – September 1); HFX Wanderers FC (August 26 – September 12); Forge FC (August 30 – September 19)
- Longest winless run: 7 matches FC Edmonton (August 16 – September 6)
- Longest losing run: 4 matches FC Edmonton (August 26 – September 6)

The 2020 Canadian Premier League season was the second season of the Canadian Premier League (CPL), the top level of Canadian soccer.

In response to the COVID-19 pandemic, the CPL announced a 14-day hold on all pre-season training on March 13, 2020. On March 20, the league announced that it would be postponing the start of the season from the previously scheduled date of April 11.

A shortened 2020 season tournament, branded as The Island Games, was played at the University of Prince Edward Island from August 13 to September 19. All players were required to self-isolate for 14 days before travelling, self-isolate for five more days upon arrival, and receive two negative COVID-19 tests before being allowed to play. As of July 29, PEI had the lowest number of COVID-19 cases among provinces, at 36.

Initially, all matches were held behind closed doors. On August 8, the league announced a partnership with the province and PEI Soccer to allow 50 minor soccer players per game to attend matches.

Atlético Ottawa joined the league as its first expansion team, bringing the total number of teams to eight. Hamilton's Forge FC defended their inaugural CPL title, blanking HFX Wanderers FC 2–0 in the final.

== Overview ==
=== Teams ===
Location of the 2020 Canadian Premier League season (green) and the homes of the eight teams (red)

The seven teams that participated in the inaugural 2019 Canadian Premier League season were set to compete in this season. They were joined by Atlético Ottawa, an expansion team who were created after USL Championship side Ottawa Fury FC suspended operations after being unable to secure approval from USSF and CONCACAF.

==== Personnel and sponsorship ====
| Team | Head coach | Captain(s) | Shirt sponsor | Kit manufacturer |
|---|---|---|---|---|
| Atlético Ottawa | (Spain) Mista | (Canada) Ben Fisk | OneSoccer | Macron |
| Cavalry | (England) Tommy Wheeldon Jr. | (Canada) Nik Ledgerwood | WestJet | Macron |
| FC Edmonton | (Canada) Jeff Paulus | (England) Tomi Ameobi | Swoop | Macron |
| Forge | (Canada) Bobby Smyrniotis | (Canada) Kyle Bekker | Tim Hortons | Macron |
| HFX Wanderers | (Trinidad and Tobago) Stephen Hart | (Trinidad and Tobago) Andre Rampersad | Volkswagen | Macron |
| Pacific | (Norway) Pa-Modou Kah | (Canada) Marcel de Jong | Volkswagen | Macron |
| Valour | (England) Rob Gale | (Canada) Dylan Carreiro | OneSoccer | Macron |
| York9 | (Canada) Jimmy Brennan | (Canada) Manny Aparicio | Macron | Macron |

==== Coaching changes ====
| Team | Outgoing coach | Manner of departure | Date of vacancy | Position in table | Incoming coach | Date of appointment |
|---|---|---|---|---|---|---|
| Pacific | (Canada) James Merriman | end of interim period | January 14, 2020 | pre-season | (Norway) Pa-Modou Kah | January 14, 2020 |
| Atlético Ottawa | N/A (inaugural season) | | January 29, 2020 | pre-season | (Spain) Mista | February 11, 2020 |

=== Original format ===
Before being postponed by the COVID-19 pandemic, the regular season was intended to be played from April 11 to October 4. The split-season format of the inaugural season was to be replaced by a single table and full double round-robin. The eight teams would have met their rivals twice at home and twice away for a total of 28 games, the same number as in 2019. The top ranked team in the regular season would have qualified for a spot in the championship final and would have been joined by the winner of a playoff between the second and third ranked teams.

== First stage ==
The eight teams played against each other once each for a total of seven matches. The top four teams advanced to the group stage.

=== Table ===
| Pos | Team | Pld | W | D | L | GF | GA | GD | Pts | Qualification |
|---|---|---|---|---|---|---|---|---|---|---|
| 1 | Cavalry | 7 | 4 | 1 | 2 | 10 | 7 | +3 | 13 | Advance to group stage |
| 2 | HFX Wanderers | 7 | 3 | 3 | 1 | 12 | 7 | +5 | 12 (Note: Head-to-head points: HFX Wanderers 1, Forge 1. Goal differential: HFX Wanderers +5, Forge +4) | Advance to group stage |
| 3 | Forge | 7 | 3 | 3 | 1 | 13 | 9 | +4 | 12 | Advance to group stage |
| 4 | Pacific | 7 | 3 | 2 | 2 | 10 | 8 | +2 | 11 | Advance to group stage |
| 5 | York9 | 7 | 2 | 4 | 1 | 8 | 7 | +1 | 10 | |
| 6 | Valour | 7 | 2 | 2 | 3 | 8 | 9 | −1 | 8 (Note: Head-to-head points: Valour 3, Atlético Ottawa 0.) | |
| 7 | Atlético Ottawa | 7 | 2 | 2 | 3 | 7 | 12 | −5 | 8 | |
| 8 | FC Edmonton | 7 | 0 | 1 | 6 | 5 | 14 | −9 | 1 | |

Source: CanPL.ca
Rules for classification: 1) points; 2) head-to-head points; 3) goal differential; 4) goals for; 5) total wins; 6) U-21 minutes; 7) coin toss or drawing of lots.

=== Results ===
| Teams | ATO | CAV | FCE | FOR | HFX | PAC | VAL | YOR |
|---|---|---|---|---|---|---|---|---|
| Atlético Ottawa | — | — | — | — | — | — | — | — |
| Cavalry | 0–2 | — | — | — | — | — | — | — |
| FC Edmonton | 2–2 | 0–2 | — | — | — | — | — | — |
| Forge | 2–0 | 2–2 | 2–0 | — | — | — | — | — |
| HFX Wanderers | 2–0 | 1–2 | 3–1 | 1–1 | — | — | — | — |
| Pacific | 0–1 | 2–1 | 2–1 | 1–2 | 2–2 | — | — | — |
| Valour | 4–0 | 0–2 | 2–1 | 2–2 | 0–2 | 0–2 | — | — |
| York9 | 2–2 | 0–1 | 1–0 | 3–2 | 1–1 | 1–1 | 0–0 | — |

Source: CanPL.ca
Legend: Blue = left column team win; Yellow = draw; Red = top row team win.

=== Results by round ===
| Team ╲ Round | 1 | 2 | 3 | 4 | 5 | 6 | 7 |
|---|---|---|---|---|---|---|---|
| Atlético Ottawa | 3 | 7 | 7 | 6 | 7 | 5 | 7 |
| Cavalry | 1 | 1 | 1 | 1 | 2 | 2 | 1 |
| FC Edmonton | 7 | 8 | 8 | 8 | 8 | 8 | 8 |
| Forge | 1 | 2 | 2 | 2 | 1 | 1 | 3 |
| HFX Wanderers | 3 | 4 | 5 | 4 | 6 | 4 | 2 |
| Pacific | 3 | 4 | 5 | 5 | 3 | 6 | 4 |
| Valour | 7 | 3 | 3 | 7 | 5 | 7 | 6 |
| York9 | 3 | 4 | 4 | 3 | 4 | 3 | 5 |

| 1st and advance to group stage | Advance to group stage |

Source: CanPL.ca
Notes: Cavalry and Forge played two matches in round 1 but did not play in round 6.

== Group stage ==
The four group stage teams met their opponents once each. The top two teams advanced to the final.

=== Table ===
| Pos | Team | Pld | W | D | L | GF | GA | GD | Pts | Qualification |
|---|---|---|---|---|---|---|---|---|---|---|
| 1 | Forge | 3 | 2 | 1 | 0 | 4 | 1 | +3 | 7 | Advance to final |
| 2 | HFX Wanderers | 3 | 1 | 1 | 1 | 3 | 7 | −4 | 4 | Advance to final |
| 3 | Cavalry | 3 | 1 | 0 | 2 | 4 | 4 | 0 | 3 (Note: Head-to-head points: Cavalry 3, Pacific 0.) | |
| 4 | Pacific | 3 | 1 | 0 | 2 | 6 | 5 | +1 | 3 | |

Source: CanPL.ca
Rules for classification: 1) points; 2) head-to-head points; 3) goal differential; 4) goals for; 5) total wins; 6) U-21 minutes; 7) coin toss or drawing of lots.

=== Results ===
| Teams | CAV | FOR | HFX | PAC |
|---|---|---|---|---|
| Cavalry | — | — | — | — |
| Forge | 1–0 | — | — | — |
| HFX Wanderers | 2–1 | 1–1 | — | — |
| Pacific | 1–3 | 0–2 | 5–0 | — |

Source: CanPL.ca
Legend: Blue = left column team win; Yellow = draw; Red = top row team win.

=== Results by round ===
| Team ╲ Round | 1 | 2 | 3 |
|---|---|---|---|
| Cavalry | 1 | 3 | 3 |
| Forge | 2 | 1 | 1 |
| HFX Wanderers | 2 | 2 | 2 |
| Pacific | 4 | 4 | 4 |

| 1st and advance to Final | Advance to Final |

Source: CanPL.ca

== Final ==
September 19
3:00 pm ADT (UTC−03:00)

| Forge FC | 2–0 | HFX Wanderers FC |
|---|---|---|
| Achinioti-Jönsson 60'; Tissot 90' | Report |

Alumni Field, Charlottetown, Prince Edward Island
Attendance: 50
Referee: Juan Márquez

== Statistical leaders ==
=== Top scorers ===
| Rank | Player | Club | Goals |
|---|---|---|---|
| 1 | (Trinidad and Tobago) Akeem Garcia | HFX Wanderers | 6 |
| 2 | (Canada) Marco Bustos | Pacific FC | 5 |
| 3 | (Brazil) João Morelli | HFX Wanderers | 4 |
| 4 | (Sweden) Alexander Achinioti-Jönsson | Forge FC | 3 |
| 4 | (Canada) Kyle Bekker | Forge FC | 3 |
| 4 | (England) Jordan Brown | Cavalry FC | 3 |
| 4 | (Mexico) Alejandro Díaz | Pacific FC | 3 |
| 4 | (Canada) Joseph Di Chiara | York9 | 3 |
| 4 | (England) Nathan Mavila | Cavalry FC | 3 |
| 4 | (Canada) Easton Ongaro | FC Edmonton | 3 |

=== Top assists ===
| Rank | Player | Club | Assists |
|---|---|---|---|
| 1 | (Canada) Marco Bustos | Pacific FC | 3 |
| 2 | (Mexico) Francisco Acuña | Atlético Ottawa | 2 |
| 2 | (Syria) Molham Babouli | Forge FC | 2 |
| 2 | (Spain) Víctor Blasco | Pacific FC | 2 |
| 2 | (Mexico) Alejandro Díaz | Pacific FC | 2 |
| 2 | (Canada) Shaan Hundal | Valour FC | 2 |
| 2 | (Canada) Brett Levis | Valour FC | 2 |
| 2 | (Jamaica) Alex Marshall | HFX Wanderers | 2 |
| 2 | (Trinidad and Tobago) Andre Rampersad | HFX Wanderers | 2 |
| 2 | (Belgium) Paolo Sabak | Forge FC | 2 |
| 2 | (Canada) Maxim Tissot | Forge FC | 2 |

=== Shutouts ===
| Rank | Player | Club | Shutouts |
|---|---|---|---|
| 1 | (Canada) Triston Henry | Forge FC | 5 |
| 2 | (Canada) Marco Carducci | Cavalry FC | 3 |
| 3 | (Canada) Nathan Ingham | York9 | 2 |
| 3 | (Canada) Christian Oxner | HFX Wanderers | 2 |
| 3 | (Canada) James Pantemis | Valour FC | 2 |
| 3 | (Spain) Nacho Zabal | Atlético Ottawa | 2 |
| 7 | (Canada) Callum Irving | Pacific FC | 1 |
| 7 | (Canada) Nolan Wirth | Pacific FC | 1 |

== Player transfers ==
=== U Sports Draft ===
The 2019 CPL–U Sports Draft was held on November 11 in Montreal, Quebec. Draftees were invited to team preseason camps, with an opportunity to earn a developmental contract and retain their U Sports men's soccer eligibility. HFX Wanderers selected Cory Bent with the first overall pick. Two players were selected by each returning CPL team, with a total of 14 players being drafted including 10 Canadians. Ottawa had not yet joined the league and did not participate in the draft.

=== Foreign players ===
Canadian Premier League teams may sign a maximum of seven international players, out of which only five can be in the starting line-up for each match. The following players are considered foreign players for the 2020 season. This list does not include Canadian citizens who represent other countries at the international level.

| Club | Player 1 | Player 2 | Player 3 | Player 4 | Player 5 | Player 6 | Player 7 |
|---|---|---|---|---|---|---|---|
| Atlético Ottawa | (England) Vashon Neufville | (Jamaica) Tevin Shaw | (Mexico) Francisco Acuña | (Ghana) Bernardinho | (Spain) Nacho Zabal | (Spain) Viti Martínez | |
| Cavalry | (England) Jordan Brown | (Honduras) José Escalante | (England) Nathan Mavila | (Brazil) Oliver | (Peru) Jair Córdova | (Brazil) Richard Luca | |
| FC Edmonton | (Cameroon) Jeannot Esua | (Trinidad and Tobago) Kareem Moses | (Spain) Ramón Soria | (South Korea) Son Yong-chan | (Sweden) Erik Zetterberg | | |
| Forge | (Sweden) Alexander Achinioti-Jönsson | (Senegal) Elimane Cissé | (Belgium) Daniël Krutzen | (Belgium) Paolo Sabak | | | |
| HFX Wanderers | (Trinidad and Tobago) Akeem Garcia | (Trinidad and Tobago) Andre Rampersad | (Germany) Peter Schaale | (Jamaica) Alex Marshall | (Brazil) João Morelli | (Brazil) Eriks Santos | (England) Cory Bent |
| Pacific | (Mexico) Alejandro Díaz | | | | | | |
| Valour | (Spain) José Galán | (Ghana) Solomon Kojo Antwi | (Haiti) Andrew Jean-Baptiste | (New Zealand) Moses Dyer | (Republic of the Congo) Arnold Bouka Moutou | | |
| York9 | (Japan) Wataru Murofushi | (Brazil) Gabriel Vasconcelos | (Japan) Fugo Segawa | (Spain) Álvaro Rivero | | | |

Players in italic denote players new to their respective clubs for the 2020 season, sorted chronologically by their announcement.

== Awards ==
=== Canadian Premier League Awards ===
The nominees for the four CPL awards were announced on September 18, one day before the league final. The awards take into account all matches from The Island Games and are voted on by reporters across Canada. The winners were announced at a ceremony on November 26, 2020.

2020 Canadian Premier League Awards
| Award | Recipient | Finalists |
|---|---|---|
| Golden Boot | (Trinidad and Tobago) Akeem Garcia (HFX Wanderers) | N/A |
| Golden Glove | (Canada) Triston Henry (Forge) | (Canada) Christian Oxner (HFX Wanderers) (Canada) Callum Irving (Pacific) |
| Coach of the Year | (Trinidad and Tobago) Stephen Hart (HFX Wanderers) | (Canada) Bobby Smyrniotis (Forge) (Spain) Mista (Atlético Ottawa) |
| Player of the Year | (Canada) Kyle Bekker (Forge) | (Canada) Marco Bustos (Pacific) (Trinidad and Tobago) Akeem Garcia (HFX Wanderers) |
| Best Under 21 Canadian Player of the Year | (Algeria) Mohamed Farsi (Cavalry) | (Canada) Chrisnovic N'sa (HFX Wanderers) (Canada) Julian Dunn (Valour) |

=== Team of the Week ===
The Gatorade Team of the Week is selected by OneSoccer staff.

| Dates | Goalkeeper | Defenders | Midfielders | Forwards | Ref |
|---|---|---|---|---|---|
| August; 13–16 | (Canada) Henry (Forge) | (Canada) Awuah (Forge) (Belgium) Krutzen (Forge) (Canada) Zator (Cavalry) (Canada) Northover (Cavalry) | (Mexico) Acuña (Ottawa) (Sweden) Achinioti-Jönsson (Forge) (Canada) Bekker (Forge) | (Canada) Bustos (Pacific) (Canada) Haber (Cavalry) (Algeria) Farsi (Cavalry) | |
| August; 18–23 | (Canada) Pantemis (Valour) | (England) Mavila (Cavalry) (Canada) Boskovic (Cavalry) (Canada) Dunn (Valour) (Canada) Chung (Pacific) | (Mali) Sissoko (HFX) (Mexico) Acuña (Ottawa) (Canada) Bekker (Forge) | (Canada) Boakai (Edmonton) (England) Brown (Cavalry) (Trinidad and Tobago) Garcia (HFX) | |
| August; 25–30 | (Canada) Oxner (HFX) | (Canada) Haynes (Pacific) (Belgium) Krutzen (Forge) (Germany) Schaale (HFX) (Canada) Chung (Pacific) | (Canada) Di Chiara (York) (Trinidad and Tobago) Rampersad (HFX) (Canada) Dixon (Pacific) | (Canada) Blasco (Pacific) (Mexico) Díaz (Pacific) (Canada) Bustos (Pacific) | |
| September; 1–6 | (Canada) Oxner (HFX) | (Canada) Levis (Valour) (Haiti) Geffrard (HFX) (Canada) Zator (Cavalry) (Canada) Chung (Pacific) | (Canada) Aparicio (York) (New Zealand) Dyer (Valour) (Mexico) Martinez (Ottawa) | (Canada) Riggi (HFX) (Trinidad and Tobago) Garcia (HFX) (Canada) Bustos (Pacific) | |
| September; 7–13 | (Canada) Henry (Forge) | (Canada) N'sa (HFX) (Belgium) Krutzen (Forge) (Canada) Zator (Cavalry) (Canada) Restrepo (HFX) | (Sweden) Achinioti-Jönsson (Forge) (Belgium) Sabak (Forge) (England) Simmons (Cavalry) | (Brazil) Morelli (HFX) (Trinidad and Tobago) Garcia (HFX) (Algeria) Farsi (Cavalry) | |
| September; 14–20 | (Canada) Henry (Forge) | (Canada) Awuah (Forge) (Belgium) Krutzen (Forge) (Canada) Meilleur-Giguère (Pacific) (Canada) Samuel (Forge) | (Philippines) Baldisimo (Pacific) (Canada) Bekker (Forge) (Sweden) Achinioti-Jönsson (Forge) | (Canada) Riggi (HFX) (Syria) Babouli (Forge) (Canada) Bustos (Pacific) | |

== Media ==
OneSoccer broadcast all matches of the tournament. CBC Television televised nine matches on Saturdays, and CHCH-TV in Hamilton broadcast Sunday matches. To visually enhance the venue for broadcast as it is only a pitch, an augmented reality "virtual stadium" was employed by host broadcaster Mediapro, rendering CGI grandstands with virtual sponsor placements. An AI-based automated camera system was used for 19 matches, using similar technology to what was used for the CEBL Summer Series.

== See also ==
- 2020 Canadian Championship
