= 2020 CPL =

2020 CPL might refer to:

- 2020 Caribbean Premier League, cricket competition
- 2020 Canadian Premier League, soccer competition
