= Vashan =

Vashan (Persian: وشن) may refer to:

- Vashan, Hamadan, Iran
- Vashan, South Khorasan, Iran
- Vashan, Tajikistan

== See also ==
- Vashon (disambiguation)
