= Susan Paul Vashon =

American educator (1838–1912)

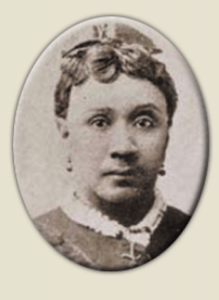
Susan Paul Vashon

Susan Paul Smith Vashon (September 19, 1838 - November 27, 1912) was an American educator, abolitionist and clubwoman. Vashon was active in helping soldier and refugees during the Civil War. She was part of the Underground Railroad. She was also a teacher and a principal. Vashon helped promote and establish several women's clubs in Missouri.

== Biography ==
Vashon was born in Boston on September 19, 1838. Vashon's father, Elijah W. Smith, was a well-known composer and cornet player. She was raised by her maternal grandmother after her mother died early in her life. Her grandfather was Thomas Paul, and other members of her family were active as abolitionists. Vashon was educated at Miss O'Mears Seminary in Somerville, Massachusetts, where she was the only black student. After graduating as valedictorian, she taught school for a short time in Pittsburgh, where she lived with her father. The principal of the school where she taught was George Boyer Vashon, whom she later married on February 17, 1857. They had their first child by September 1859, after which she stopped teaching. The couple had 7 children together.

George Vashon, his father, and Susan Vashon were all involved in aiding the Underground Railroad. Susan Vashon aided wounded soldiers during the Civil War. In 1864 and 1865, she created several fund-raising bazaars to fund medical care and housing for soldiers and refugees in Pittsburgh.

The Vashon family moved to Washington, D.C. in 1872. Vashon started teaching again and eventually was promoted to principal at Thaddeus Stevens School, where she worked until 1880.

Vashon and her family moved to St. Louis in 1882. In St. Louis, she became involved with Missouri State Federation of Colored Women's Clubs and served as its president in 1902. Vashon helped create the St. Louis Association of Colored Women's Clubs and served as its president in 1903. Vashon was instrumental in having the National Association of Colored Women (NACW) holding their national convention in St. Louis in 1904.

Vashon died in her home on November 27, 1912. She was buried in Bellefontaine Cemetery. Vashon High School in St. Louis is named after the Vashon family.
