= Michel Djaozandry =

Canadian soccer player (born 1998)

Personal information
- Date of birth: 17 February 1998 (age 28)
- Place of birth: Trois-Rivières, Quebec, Canada
- Height: 1.73 m (5 ft 8 in)
- Positions: Full-back; midfielder

Team information
- Current team: CS Trois-Rivieres

Youth career
- 2012: CS Trois-Rivières
- 2013: L'Assomption
- 2014–2015: CS Sainte-Julie
- 2016–2017: Montreal Impact

Senior career*
Years	Team	Apps	(Gls)
2017–2019	St-Hubert	31	(1)
2020	Atlético Ottawa	1	(0)
2025–	CS Trois-Rivières	7	(0)
- * Club domestic league appearances and goals as of September 19, 2025

Michel Djaozandry (born February 17, 1998) is a Canadian professional soccer player who plays as a full-back for CS Trois-Rivières.

== Early life ==
Djaozandry was born in Trois-Rivières, Quebec. At youth level, he played soccer for Trois-Rivières, L'Assomption and Sainte-Julie.

In 2016 and 2017, Djaozandry played for the academy of Major League Soccer club Montreal Impact, making 22 appearances in the USSDA and scoring one goal.

== Club career ==
In 2013, Djaozandry played for CNHP (Centre National de Haute Performance) which is located in Laval, Montréal. He did so for two years (2015).

In 2017, Djaozandry played for Première Ligue de soccer du Québec side CS St-Hubert, making ten appearances. The following year, he made nine appearances for the club. He participated in the CPL Open Trials in fall 2018, but failed to make the final cut.

In 2019, Djaozandry made twelve appearances for St-Hubert and scored one goal. That year, he spent time on trial with USL Championship side Ottawa Fury and was invited to pre-season in 2020, but the club folded that off-season.

On 10 March 2020, Djaozandry signed his first professional contract with Canadian Premier League side Atlético Ottawa. On 30 August 2020, he made his professional debut as a substitute in a 2–0 loss to Forge FC, which would be his only appearance of the shortened 2020 season. On 26 February 2021, he was released by Ottawa.

In 2021, he played for St-Hubert's Reserve side in the PLSQ Reserve Division, but did not appear for the first team.

== Personal life ==
Djaozandry is of Malagasy descent.

== Career statistics ==
As of 23 September 2025

Club statistics
Club	Season	League			National Cup		League Cup		Total	
Club	Season	Division	Apps	Goals	Apps	Goals	Apps	Goals	Apps	Goals
CS St-Hubert	2017	PLSQ	10	0	—		4	0	10	0
CS St-Hubert	2018	PLSQ	9	0	—		2	0	11	0
CS St-Hubert	2019	PLSQ	12	1	—		3	2	12	1
CS St-Hubert	Total		31	1	0	0	9	2	40	3
Atlético Ottawa	2020	Canadian Premier League	1	0	0	0	0	0	1	0
CS Trois-Rivières	2025	Ligue2 Québec	7	0	—		—		7	0
Career total			39	1	0	0	9	2	48	3
