= Maksym Kowal =

Canadian soccer player (born 1991)

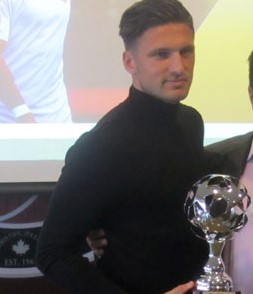
- Kowal in 2019

Personal information
- Full name: Maksym Danylo Kowal
- Date of birth: June 4, 1991 (age 35)
- Place of birth: Toronto, Ontario, Canada
- Height: 1.82 m (6 ft 0 in)
- Positions: Forward; midfielder

Youth career
- USC Karpaty
- Erin Mills SC

College career
| Years | Team | Apps | (Gls) |
| 2009–2012 | Buffalo Bulls | 68 | (8) |

Senior career*
| Years | Team | Apps | (Gls) |
| 2012 | Des Moines Menace | 10 | (1) |
| 2013 | Toronto Lynx | 11 | (2) |
| 2013 | Barnstaple Town | | |
| 2013–2014 | Tiverton Town | | |
| 2014 | Carlton Town | 10 | (1) |
| 2015 | Widzew Łódź | 0 | (0) |
| 2015–2016 | Raków Częstochowa | 13 | (2) |
| 2016 | → Olimpia Zambrów (loan) | 13 | (1) |
| 2016–2017 | ŁKS Łódź | 25 | (4) |
| 2017–2018 | Tasman United | 18 | (6) |
| 2018 | North Wellington AFC | 18 | (23) |
| 2018–2019 | Canterbury United FC | 14 | (6) |
| 2019 | Vaughan Azzurri | 14 | (14) |
| 2019 | FC Ukraine United | 4 | (2) |
| 2020 | Atlético Ottawa | 3 | (0) |
| 2020–2022 | Germania Halberstadt | 16 | (1) |
| 2022–2023 | Greifswalder FC | 27 | (1) |
| 2024 | Scrosoppi FC | 2 | (0) |
| 2024 | → Scrosoppi FC B | 1 | (1) |
| 2024–2025 | Canadian Crusaders (indoor) | 3 | (1) |
| 2025 | Alliance United FC | 12 | (5) |

Managerial career
- 2024: Algoma Thunderbirds (women) (interim)
- * Club domestic league appearances and goals as of August 25, 2025

Maksym Danylo Kowal (born June 4, 1991) is a Canadian professional soccer player who plays as a forward.

== Early life ==
Kowal was born in Toronto, growing up in nearby Mississauga, Ontario and is of Ukrainian descent. He began playing youth soccer with USC Karpaty, later moving to the Erin Mills Eagles at U14 level.

== Club career ==
=== College and Semi-pro ===
Kowal attended the University at Buffalo beginning in 2009 and played for the soccer team. During his college tenure he played in the USL Premier Development League with Des Moines Menace and Toronto Lynx.

=== England ===
In 2013, he went abroad to England, first joining non-league club Barnstaple Town F.C. Afterwards, he joined Tiverton Town F.C. He then joined eighth tier Carlton Town F.C.

=== Poland ===
In 2015, he joined Polish second-tier club Widzew Łódź in the I liga, however, due to procedural reasons with having arrived from a non-professional club, he was unable to be registered to be eligible for league matches. Widzew was relegated at the end of the season and went bankrupt and was relegated to the fifth tier, and subsequently, in July 2015, Kowal joined third-tier club Raków Częstochowa in the II liga. In February 2016, he joined Olimpia Zambrów on a six-month loan. The following season, he joined ŁKS Łódź helping them win promotion that season.

=== New Zealand ===
In 2017, he joined ISPS Handa Premiership side Tasman United in the New Zealand first tier, being recommended by a friend who played in the league. In the offseason, he joined North Wellington AFC in New Zealand's second-tier Central Premier League, where he helped lead the team to the league championship and won the Golden Boot as the league's top goalscorer with 23 goals, while also adding another three goals in the 2018 Chatham Cup. He was also named the league player of the year. In September 2018, he then returned to the top tier for the new season, joining Canterbury United.

=== Canada ===
In 2019, he returned to the North American continent to play in League1 Ontario with Vaughan Azzurri. He featured in the 2019 Canadian Championship against HFX Wanderers FC. In July, he scored a hat trick against Durham United FA in 21 minutes. In his debut season with Vaughan, he finished as the league's top goalscorer, winning the Golden Boot, as well as being named league MVP. In late 2019, he played in the Canadian Soccer League with FC Ukraine United.

On August 10, 2020, Kowal signed with Canadian Premier League side Atlético Ottawa. He made his debut in Ottawa's inaugural match on August 15 against York9, coming on as a substitute and playing out a 2–2 draw.

=== Germany ===
On October 27, 2020, Kowal joined German club Germania Halberstadt in the fourth-tier Regionalliga Nordost. A day later, he made his debut for the club, scoring a goal against Chemie Leipzig. He celebrated the goal by taking off his jersey, which earned him a second yellow card, resulting in him being ejected from the match. He then had to return to Canada, due to travel issues, before returning to Germany, however, the season was suspended soon after for the remainder of 2020, due to the second wave of the COVID-19 pandemic.

In July 2022, Kowal joined newly promoted side Greifswalder FC in the same division. After a season with Greifswalder, he left the club in the summer of 2023.

=== Return to Canada ===
In 2024, he returned to Canada, joining Scrosoppi FC in League1 Ontario.

In 2025, he began playing with the Canadian Crusaders in Major League Indoor Soccer.

Later in 2025, he played with Alliance United FC in League1 Ontario.

== Managerial career ==
Kowal began his coaching career in 2016 while still playing, as an assistant coach with ProStars FC at the U17 level in Germany.In 2024, he was named interim head coach for Algoma University's women's soccer team, and lead assistant with the men's team.

== Personal life ==
Born in Mississauga, Ontario, Canada, Kowal's family has Ukrainian origins, although his parents were both born in Poland. He holds dual citizenship with Poland and Canada. His father played professional basketball in Poland with AZS Szczecin and AZS Koszalin. He attended St. Paul Secondary School in Mississauga and played youth soccer for the Erin Mills Eagles SC, where he won the U18 provincial championship in 2009.

== Career statistics ==
As of match played December 31, 2025

Appearances and goals by club, season and competition
| Club | Season | League | | | Cup | | Other | | Total | |
| Club | Season | Division | Apps | Goals | Apps | Goals | Apps | Goals | Apps | Goals |
|---|---|---|---|---|---|---|---|---|---|---|
| Des Moines Menace | 2012 | Premier Development League | 10 | 1 | 1 | 0 | — | | 11 | 1 |
| Toronto Lynx | 2013 | Premier Development League | 11 | 2 | — | | — | | 11 | 2 |
| Barnstaple Town | 2013–14 | Western Football League First Division | | | | | — | | | |
| Tiverton Town | 2013–14 | Southern FL - Div. 1 South&West | | | | | | | | |
| Carlton Town | 2014–15 | Northern Premier League - Div. One South | 10 | 1 | 2 | 1 | — | | 12 | 2 |
| Widzew Łódź | 2014–15 | I liga | 0 | 0 | 0 | 0 | — | | 0 | 0 |
| Raków Częstochowa | 2015–16 | II liga | 13 | 2 | 1 | 0 | — | | 14 | 2 |
| Olimpia Zambrów (loan) | 2015–16 | II liga | 13 | 1 | 0 | 0 | — | | 13 | 1 |
| ŁKS Łódź | 2016–17 | III liga, group I | 25 | 4 | 0 | 0 | — | | 25 | 4 |
| Tasman United | 2017–18 | New Zealand Football Championship | 18 | 6 | 0 | 0 | — | | 18 | 6 |
| North Wellington | 2018 | Central Premier League | 18 | 23 | 4 | 3 | — | | 22 | 26 |
| Canterbury United | 2018–19 | New Zealand Football Championship | 16 | 6 | — | | 1 | 0 | 17 | 6 |
| Vaughan Azzurri | 2019 | League1 Ontario | 14 | 14 | 2 | 0 | 2 | 2 | 18 | 16 |
| FC Ukraine United | 2019 | Canadian Soccer League | 4 | 2 | — | | | | 4 | 2 |
| Atlético Ottawa | 2020 | Canadian Premier League | 3 | 0 | — | | — | | 3 | 0 |
| Germania Halberstadt | 2020–21 | Regionalliga Nordost | 1 | 1 | 0 | 0 | — | | 1 | 1 |
| Germania Halberstadt | 2021–22 | Regionalliga Nordost | 15 | 0 | 0 | 0 | — | | 15 | 0 |
| Greifswalder FC | 2022–23 | Regionalliga Nordost | 27 | 1 | 0 | 0 | — | | 27 | 1 |
| Scrosoppi FC | 2024 | League1 Ontario Premier | 2 | 0 | — | | — | | 2 | 0 |
| Scrosoppi FC B | 2024 | League2 Ontario | 1 | 1 | — | | 0 | 0 | 1 | 1 |
| Alliance United FC | 2025 | League1 Ontario Premier | 12 | 5 | — | | 0 | 0 | 12 | 5 |
| Career total | | | 213 | 69 | 10 | 4 | 3 | 2 | 226 | 76 |
