= Mary Frances Vashon =

African American journalist (1818–1854)

Mary Frances Vashon (c. 1818 – September 1854) also known as Mary Frances Colder, and by her pen name Fanny Homewood, was an African American journalist and an abolitionist in the 19th century. She was one of the first African American female journalists in the United States.

== Biography ==
Vashon was born in about 1818 in Virginia, to parents Anne (née Smith) and John Bathan Vashon. In 1822, they moved to Carlisle, Pennsylvania, where her father opened a saloon and livery stable and her brother, George Boyer Vashon, was born two years later, in 1824. In 1829, her father moved the family to Pittsburgh, where he became a successful barber. This success led him to become a wealthy landowner and allowed him to open Pittsburgh's first bathhouse, which he operated as a stop on Pittsburgh's Underground Railroad. Her father, at that point the wealthiest black man in Pittsburgh, spared no expense on her education.

Because Pittsburgh did not provide public education for black children at the time, her father began a school, the Pittsburgh African Education, in the basement of an African Methodist Episcopal church, where Mary Frances may have received some of her early schooling alongside her brother George and Martin Delaney. She was sent to Philadelphia to study at the private school, Female Academy of Miss Sarah Mapps Douglass, and went on to take out ads in Martin Delaney's newspaper, The Mystery, advertising raised embroidery lessons.

== Career ==
An avid abolitionist, Mary Frances Vashon took her knowledge into the field of journalism, writing for anti-slavery newspapers, including William Howard Day's The Alienated American and Frederick Douglass's "Frederick Douglass' Paper", under the name of "Fanny Homewood", "Fanny" being the name of her maternal grandmother. This made her one of the pioneering black women journalists in the United States.

Mary Francis married Benjamin F. Colder and had four children, a boy and three girls, with him. On December 29, 1853, her father suffered a heart attack and died in a Pittsburgh train station. In September 1854, Mary, age 36, and her mother, Anne, followed him in death as a cholera epidemic swept through Pittsburgh. Her brother, George, would go on to take charge of her four children.
