= Ignacio Zabal =

Spanish footballer

Nacho Zabal
Personal information
- Full name: Ignacio Zabal Almazán
- Date of birth: 14 February 1987 (age 39)
- Place of birth: Alfaro, Spain
- Height: 1.94 m (6 ft 4 in)
- Position: Goalkeeper

Youth career
- Osasuna

Senior career*
Years	Team	Apps	(Gls)
2006–2011	Osasuna B	74	(0)
2011–2013	Osasuna	0	(0)
2011–2012	→ Numancia (loan)	19	(0)
2012–2013	→ Huesca (loan)	4	(0)
2013–2014	Huesca	24	(0)
2014–2015	Alcoyano	3	(0)
2015–2016	Toledo	16	(0)
2016–2017	Arandina	21	(0)
2017–2018	Amorebieta	30	(0)
2018–2019	Calahorra	47	(0)
2020	Atlético Ottawa	7	(0)
2021	Sant Julià	0	(0)
2021–2022	Tudelano	17	(0)
2022–2023	Alfaro	18	(0)
- * Club domestic league appearances and goals as of 18:57, 10 October 2023 (UTC)

Ignacio 'Nacho' Zabal Almazán (born 14 February 1987) is a Spanish professional footballer who plays as a goalkeeper.

== Club career ==
=== Spain ===
Born in Alfaro, La Rioja, Zabal came through the youth ranks at CA Osasuna and made his senior debut for their reserves in the Segunda División B on 19 March 2006, in a 1–1 away draw against CF Badalona. On 28 June 2011, he was loaned to Segunda División team CD Numancia for the upcoming season, and appeared in his first professional match on 7 September in the second round of the Copa del Rey, saving a penalty from Ander Lafuente in a shootout victory at FC Cartagena following a goalless draw.

Zabal was loaned out again in the 2012–13 campaign, to second-tier club SD Huesca. Despite only six competitive appearances and relegation, he signed a permanent deal with the Aragonese for the following season.

After that, Zabal continued competing in division three, with CD Alcoyano, CD Toledo, Arandina CF, SD Amorebieta and CD Calahorra.

=== Atlético Ottawa ===
On 2 April 2020, Zabal signed with Atlético Ottawa. He made his debut in their first ever match in the Canadian Premier League, a 2–2 draw against York9 FC on 15 August.

Zabal appeared in all league games during the season. On 26 February 2021, he was released.

=== Later career ===
On 10 June 2021, Zabal joined UE Sant Julià in the Andorran Primera Divisió. He returned to his country only two months later, however, agreeing to a deal at CD Tudelano.

== Career statistics ==
As of 6 September 2020

Club statistics
Club	Season	League			National Cup (Note: Includes appearances in Copa del Rey)		Continental		Other (Note: Includes appearances in Segunda División B play-offs)		Total	
Club	Season	Division	Apps	Goals	Apps	Goals	Apps	Goals	Apps	Goals	Apps	Goals
Osasuna B	2005–06	Segunda División B	1	0	—		—		0	0	1	0
Osasuna B	2006–07	Segunda División B	5	0	—		—		0	0	5	0
Osasuna B	2007–08	Segunda División B	6	0	—		—		0	0	6	0
Osasuna B	2008–09	Segunda División B	5	0	—		—		0	0	5	0
Osasuna B	2009–10	Segunda División B	24	0	—		—		0	0	24	0
Osasuna B	2010–11	Segunda División B	33	0	—		—		0	0	33	0
Osasuna B	Total		74	0	0	0	0	0	0	0	74	0
Numancia (loan)	2011–12	Segunda División	19	0	2	0	—		0	0	21	0
Huesca	2012–13	Segunda División	4	0	2	0	—		0	0	6	0
Huesca	2013–14	Segunda División B	24	0	2	0	—		0	0	26	0
Huesca	Total		28	0	4	0	0	0	0	0	32	0
Alcoyano	2014–15	Segunda División B	3	0	3	0	—		0	0	6	0
Toledo	2015–16	Segunda División B	15	0	0	0	—		1	0	16	0
Arandina	2016–17	Segunda División B	21	0	0	0	—		0	0	21	0
Arandina	2017–18	Segunda División B	30	0	0	0	—		0	0	30	0
Calahorra	2018–19	Segunda División B	33	0	0	0	—		0	0	33	0
Calahorra	2019–20	Segunda División B	14	0	0	0	—		0	0	14	0
Calahorra	Total		47	0	0	0	0	0	0	0	47	0
Atlético Ottawa	2020	Canadian Premier League	7	0	0	0	—		0	0	7	0
Sant Julià	2021–22	Primera Divisió	0	0	0	0	0	0	0	0	0	0
Career total			239	0	9	0	0	0	1	0	249	0
