= George Boyer Vashon =

American scholar, poet and abolitionist (1824–1878)

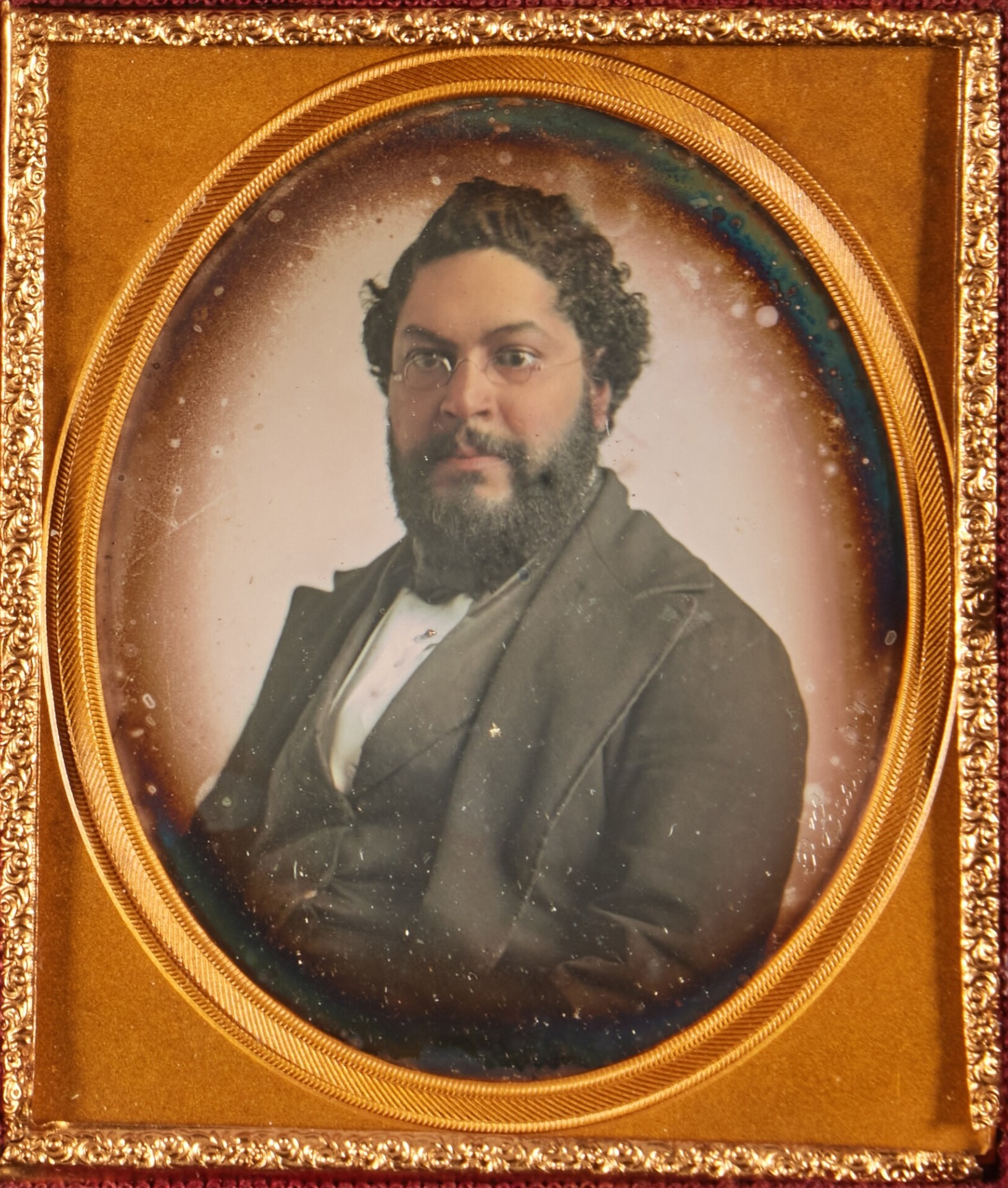
- Vashon in 1856
- Born: July 25, 1824; Carlisle, Pennsylvania, US
- Died: October 5, 1878 (aged 54); Rodney, Mississippi, US
- Occupations: Lawyer; educator
- Spouse: Susan Paul Vashon (m. 1857; died 1878)
- Children: 7
- Relatives: Mary Frances Vashon (sister)

George Boyer Vashon (July 25, 1824 – October 5, 1878) was an American lawyer, scholar, educator, essayist, poet, and abolitionist. Vashon was the first practicing African American lawyer in New York State.

== Early life and education ==
George Boyer Vashon was born on July 25, 1824, in Carlisle, Pennsylvania to John Bathan Vashon (Note: Also cited as John Bethune Vashon.) (1792– 1853), a seaman, businessman, and abolitionist, and Anne Smith. The second of three siblings, Vashon was the younger brother of the journalist and abolitionist Mary Frances Vashon. In 1840, at age 16, he enrolled in Oberlin Collegiate Institute (later Oberlin College), and in 1844 he became its first African-American graduate, and the valedictorian of his class.

Vashon's graduation from Oberlin was not only a personal triumph, but also an important step for the anti-slavery movement. Oberlin had welcomed and attracted black American students. It was a key initiative of the anti-slavery movement - to prepare for final emancipation. Before Vashon a few black American students had enrolled in Oberlin but dropped out. Nearly ten years went by between the founding of Oberlin and Vashon's graduation. His graduation was a relief. (Note: Money from wealthy abolitionists was a key component of the anti-slavery movement. Gerrit Smith started a college in New York, where George Boyer Vashon taught for a time. Smith supported John Brown, whose father was an Oberlin College board member. The Tappan family invested in Oberlin with the intention of educating black American students. Had Vashon not graduated when he did, doubt and discouragement would have festered in the anti-slavery movement. Black American history is wrongly written with a concentration of deprivation, victimization and violence and not the progress and advancement that was achieved. The advancement of Vashon and Langston was so critical because the resources, the attention and the expectations of the anti-slavery movement's leadership were very narrowly concentrated. Vashon and Langston graduated from Oberlin and in the balance the commitments of the Tappans, Gerrit Smith, etc were kept intact. The Oberlin community, which here is to include the college was a focal point for the Second Great Awakening, a period of religious, moral, and social reformation.) Vashon's early education in Pittsburgh was provided in part by Rev. Lewis Woodson, who also taught Martin Delany. Delany lived with the Vashon family for a time. The second Oberlin graduate was John Mercer Langston, who lived for a time in his youth in Cincinnati with one of Lewis Woodson's brothers. Vashon mentored Langston. (Note: Both the Woodson family and the Langston/Quarles family intermarried with the Clark family of Cincinnati. John Woodson married Eveline Clark and John Mercer Langston, an orphan, lived with the couple for a time. Vashon, Clark, Woodson, and Langston/Quarles family members formed a clan that remained bonded for two generations. After George Boyer Vashon's death his family lived in St. Louis, next door to Peter H. Clark.) In all 23 black Americans graduated from Oberlin College before the Civil War.

== Career ==
Vashon was the first practicing African-American lawyer in New York State, but was denied the right to practice in Pennsylvania because of his "race", first in 1847 and again in 1868. According to Judge Thomas Mellon, "The teachings of history and physiology clearly establish the fact that social equality and connection between the races in the domestic relations can only be productive of evil—shortening life and weakening the physical and mental condition, as a general rule." He proposed that there be a separate territory for Blacks in the United States where they could vote, practice law, and serve on juries, but not in Pennsylvania.

Using the same credentials, Vashon was the following week admitted to practice before the U.S. Supreme Court.

In 1853, he was a prominent attendee of the radical abolitionist National African American Convention in Rochester, New York. His was one of five names attached to the address of the convention to the people of the United States published under the title, The Claims of Our Common Cause, along with Frederick Douglass, James Monroe Whitfield, Henry O. Wagoner, and Amos Noë Freeman. In 1853 he joined the faculty of New York Central College, near Cortland, New York, as a replacement for exiled William G. Allen. In the 1870s he lived and worked for a time in Washington, D.C., where he also taught young African Americans at a night school there.

== Personal life ==
In 1857, Vashon married Susan Paul Vashon, an educator, abolitionist and clubwoman. The couple had seven children.

Vashon died during the Mississippi Valley yellow fever epidemic on October 5, 1878.

== Legacy ==
Vashon High School, in St. Louis, Missouri, is named for Vashon and his son, John Boyer Vashon.

In 2010, 163 years after he applied, the Pennsylvania Bar admitted him with the Attorney ID number of 1.

== See also ==
- List of first minority male lawyers and judges in New York
