= Jarred Phillips =

Canadian soccer player (born 1995)

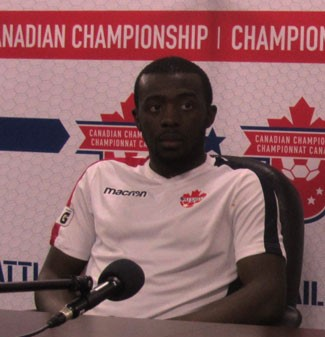
- Phillips in 2019

Personal information
- Full name: Jarred Phillips
- Date of birth: 14 May 1995 (age 31)
- Height: 1.73 m (5 ft 8 in)
- Position: Full-back

Senior career*
Years	Team	Apps	(Gls)
2012	SC Toronto II		
2012	SC Toronto		
2016–2019	Vaughan Azzurri	57	(4)
2018–2019	Mississauga MetroStars (indoor)	15	(6)
2019	Toronto Croatia		
2020	Atlético Ottawa	5	(0)
2021	Vaughan Azzurri	10	(0)
2022	Simcoe County Rovers	18	(1)
2023	Vaughan Azzurri	11	(0)
2024	Vaughan Azzurri B	2	(0)
2025–	Canadian Crusaders (indoor)	17	(4)
- * Club domestic league appearances and goals as of April 11, 2026

Jarred Phillips (born 14 May 1995) is a Canadian professional soccer player who currently plays for the Canadian Crusaders of Major League Indoor Soccer. He plays as a full-back.

== Club career ==
Phillips initially played in the Canadian Soccer League's second division with SC Toronto's reserve team in 2012. The reserve squad would reach the championship final where they defeated Brampton City United II for the title. He also managed to graduate to the senior team throughout the 2012 season. He helped the senior side secure a playoff berth by finishing third in the league's first division. In the opening round of the postseason, the Toronto side was defeated by the Serbian White Eagles.

From 2016 to 2019, Phillips played with Vaughan Azzurri in League1 Ontario. He scored his first goal in a 4–3 victory on June 11 against Master's FA. He won the 2016 League1 Ontario title with Vaughan, appeared in both legs of the 2016 Inter-Provincial Cup against PLSQ champions Mont-Royal Outremont, and was named a league Second Team All-Star. In 2017, he was again named a Second Team All-Star. In 2018, he was named a league First Team All-Star, helping Vaughan to capture the League and Cup double.

In 2019, he played all 180 minutes of both legs of Vaughan's Canadian Championship series against HFX Wanderers. In 2020, he was named to the League1 Ontario All-Time Best XI.

In the summer of 2019, he participated in the Croatian World Club Championship with Toronto Croatia where he assisted the Croats in advancing to the tournament finals by recording a goal against Vojvođanski Hrvata. He played in the championship finals where Toronto lost the match in a penalty shootout to SC Croat San Pedro.

In August 2020, Phillips signed his first professional contract with Canadian Premier League expansion side Atlético Ottawa. He made his debut in Ottawa's inaugural match on August 15 against York9. On 26 February 2021, he was released by Ottawa.

After departing Ottawa Phillips returned to the Vaughan Azzurri for the 2021 League1 Ontario season, helping them with the East Division and being named an East Division All-Star.

In January 2022, the Simcoe County Rovers announced they had signed Phillips, ahead of their inaugural season in League1 Ontario.

=== Indoor soccer ===
In the winter of 2018, he played in the Major Arena Soccer League with Mississauga MetroStars.

In 2025, he played with the Canadian Crusaders in Major League Indoor Soccer.

== Minifootball career ==
In 2023, he played with Sports Leagues Canada FC at The Soccer Tournament, finishing in second place.

== Career statistics ==
As of July 31, 2024

Club statistics
Club	Season	League			Playoffs		National Cup (Note: Includes appearances in the Canadian Championship.)		Other (Note: Includes appearances in the Inter-Provincial Cup and League1 Ontario Cup)		Total	
Club	Season	Division	Apps	Goals	Apps	Goals	Apps	Goals	Apps	Goals	Apps	Goals
Vaughan Azzurri	2016	League1 Ontario	17	1	1	0	—		2	0	20	1
Vaughan Azzurri	2017	League1 Ontario	19	1	—		—		1+	0	20	1
Vaughan Azzurri	2018	League1 Ontario	12	2	3	1	—		3+	0	18	3
Vaughan Azzurri	2019	League1 Ontario	9	0	1	0	2	0	—		12	0
Vaughan Azzurri	Total		57	4	4	0	2	0	6	0	70	5
Atlético Ottawa	2020	Canadian Premier League	5	0	—		—		—		5	0
Vaughan Azzurri	2021	League1 Ontario	10	0	1	0	—		—		11	0
Simcoe County Rovers	2022	League1 Ontario	18	1	2	0	—		—		20	1
Vaughan Azzurri	2023	League1 Ontario	11	0	2	0	1	0	—		14	0
Vaughan Azzurri B	2024	League1 Ontario	2	0	0	0	—		—		2	0
Career total			103	5	9	0	3	0	6	0	122	6
