= Mohamed Kourouma (soccer) =

Guinean professional footballer (born 1990)

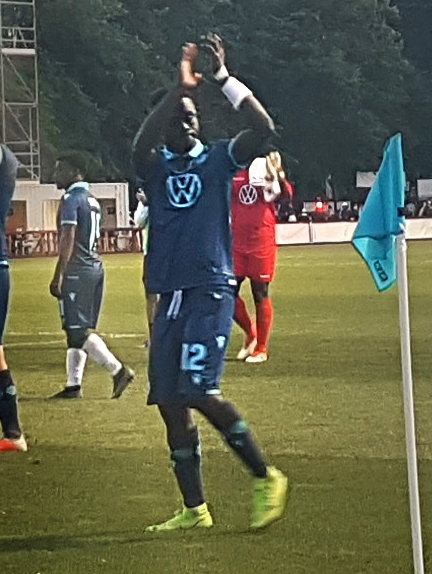
- Kourouma playing for HFX Wanderers in 2019

Personal information
- Date of birth: 4 August 1990 (age 36)
- Place of birth: Conakry, Guinea
- Height: 1.83 m (6 ft 0 in)
- Position: Forward

Youth career
- 2010–2011: Gent

College career
Years	Team	Apps	(Gls)
- Concordia Stingers

Senior career*
Years	Team	Apps	(Gls)
2009–2010	Red Star		
2012–2013	AS Kaloum		
2016–2017	FC Miami City	26	(20)
2019	HFX Wanderers	26	(1)
2020	Atlético Ottawa	7	(1)
2025–	AS Laval	15	(8)
- * Club domestic league appearances and goals as of September 6, 2025

Mohamed Kourouma (born 4 August 1990) is a professional soccer player who plays as a forward.

== Early life ==
Kourouma was born in Guinea and grew up in Montreal, Canada.

== Club career ==
In 2009, Kourouma signed with French CFA side Red Star 93. After a year in France, Kourouma joined the reserve side of Belgian First Division A club Gent. After leaving Gent, he returned to Guinea to play for Guinean Championnat National side AS Kaloum.

In 2016 and 2017, Kourouma played with FC Miami City in the Premier Development League.

In the summer of 2018, Kourouma spent two weeks on trial with French Ligue 1 club Nîmes Olympique after being scouted while at Miami City. In September 2018, Kourouma participated in the Canadian Premier League Open Trials and made the final cut of 28 players.

In April 2019, Kourouma signed with HFX Wanderers FC of the Canadian Premier League. After the season, the club announced that Kourouma would not be returning for the 2020 season.

In August 2020, Kourouma signed with Atlético Ottawa, ahead of their inaugural season in the Canadian Premier League. On 15 August 2020, he scored the club's first-ever goal in their first match, in a 2–2 draw against York9 FC. After the season, he departed the club.

== Career statistics ==
As of 15 August 2020

Club statistics
Club	Season	League			Playoffs		National Cup (Note: Includes the Canadian Championship.)		League Cup		Total	
Club	Season	Division	Apps	Goals	Apps	Goals	Apps	Goals	Apps	Goals	Apps	Goals
FC Miami City	2016	Premier Development League	13	9	—		—		—		13	9
FC Miami City	2017	Premier Development League	13	11	2	0	—		—		15	11
FC Miami City	Total		26	20	2	0	0	0	0	0	28	20
HFX Wanderers	2019	Canadian Premier League	26	1	—		6	3	—		32	4
Atlético Ottawa	2020	Canadian Premier League	7	1	—		—		—		7	1
Career total			59	22	2	0	6	3	0	0	67	25
