= Ricky Gomes =

Canadian soccer player (born 1993)

Personal information
- Full name: Richard Soares Gomes
- Date of birth: July 19, 1993 (age 33)
- Place of birth: Kitchener, Ontario, Canada
- Height: 1.88 m (6 ft 2 in)
- Position: Goalkeeper

Youth career
- Kitchener SC
- 2008–2010: Porto
- 2009–2010: → Padroense (loan)
- 2010–2011: Gondomar
- 2011–2012: Vitória Setubal

Senior career*
Years	Team	Apps	(Gls)
2010–2011	Gondomar	0	(0)
2012	Sousense		
2012–2013	Mirandela	1	(0)
2013–2014	União Montemor	5	(0)
2014–2015	Deportivo B	0	(0)
2015	MVV Maastricht	0	(0)
2015–2016	AC Malveira	1	(0)
2016–2018	Arbroath	33	(0)
2018–2019	Olhanense	3	(0)
2019	Casa Pia	4	(0)
2019–2020	União Madeira	14	(0)
2020	Atlético Ottawa	0	(0)
2022	Simcoe County Rovers	15	(0)
2024	BVB IA Waterloo B	1	(0)
Total		77+	(0)

International career
2015	Canada U23	1	(0)
- * Club domestic league appearances and goals as of June 12, 2024

Richard Soares Gomes (born July 19, 1993) is a Canadian former professional soccer player who plays as a goalkeeper.

== Early career ==
Gomes began playing soccer at age four with Kitchener Youth SC. He later became part of the Ontario provincial program and at age 13 went to a tournament hosted by Brazilian club Cruzeiro, where he attracted the interest of a few Brazilian clubs, but his parents did not want him to move to Brazil on his own.

He left Canada at age 14 to move to Portugal to pursue his soccer career. He went on trials with the youth sides of Portuguese clubs Benfica and Sporting, Italian club Empoli, and Spanish side Espanyol, with Benfica inviting him back for their U16 team's preseason, however, he was then offered a trial and contract with the youth team of Portuguese club F.C. Porto, who were located closer to his family, ultimately joining their U17 program. His aunt in Portugal had been influential in organizing the various trials, emailed the Portuguese big three clubs. After a season with Porto in which he did not play much, he went on loan with the U19 side of Padroense, while also continuing to train with Porto, helping Padroense win their division and being promoted to the first division.

After that season, he moved to the Gondomar youth system, while also serving as the third-choice keeper for the first team. Afterwards, he joined Vitória Setubal, where he eventually had to leave the club, after not being paid for five months.

== Club career ==
In 2012, after spending pre-season with Braga, he was unable to join the club as Setubal blocked his transfer.

Ultimately, in 2012, he joined UD Sousense in the Portuguese lower divisions, before later joining Mirandela of the third tier Campeonato de Portugal in late 2012, initially serving as the back-up goalkeeper. After the club sold their starting keeper, Gomes became the first-choice keeper, however, in the first practice after his first start, he suffered an injury, putting him out of action.

Afterwards, he joined another Portuguese club in the Campeonato de Portugal, União Montemor.

In October 2014, Gomes signed with Deportivo La Coruña B, in the Spanish Tercera División. However, Deportivo was concerned about signing him to a full contract, as they would have to pay all of his previous clubs a fee, as well as Gomes' dedication to the Canada national team program which caused him to miss multiple games. He departed the club in January 2015.

In January 2015, he joined Dutch club MVV Maastricht, before departing in June.

In 2015, he returned to Portugal, signing with Campeonato de Portugal side AC Malveira.

In July 2016, he moved to Scottish club Arbroath in the Scottish League Two. He made his unofficial debut in pre-season on July 9, as a second-half substitute against Raith Rovers, He made his official debut on August 2 in the 2016–17 Scottish Challenge Cup against Inverness Caledonian Thistle U20, having to leave the match due to injury. He did not see action again until the 8th league match of the season, following an injury to keeper Robbie Mutch. In the following match, he played his first full match, earning Man of the Match honours after keeping a clean sheet in a 2-0 victory over Forfar Athletic on October 18. Serving as the first choice keeper for the remainder of the season, he helped the club win the League Two title and promotion to the Scottish League One. After the season, he re-signed with the club for another season.

In 2018, he joined Olhanense in the third tier Campeonato de Portugal. After serving primarily as a substitute goalkeeper, with limited opportunities, he moved to Casa Pia in February 2019, who played in the same division. He was part of Casa Pia's 2019 title winning team.

In August 2019, he joined União Madeira.

In March 2020, Gomes signed with Atlético Ottawa of the Canadian Premier League, returning to Canada after 12 years in Europe. He was attracted to joining the club, due to the club being owned by Spanish club Atlético Madrid. He departed the club after the season, upon the expiry of his contract with the club deciding to not renew his contract, after not having made an appearance for the club in the shortened season.

In May 2022, he joined the Simcoe County Rovers in League1 Ontario.

== International career ==
Gomes made his debut in the Canadian youth program in 2012, under then-coach Nick Dasovic He was part of the Canadian team that competed at the 2013 CONCACAF Under-20 Championship and played for Canada U23 at the 2015 Pan Am Games.

== Post-playing career ==
In October 2023, he joined BVB IA Waterloo as a youth team coach.
