= Erik Zetterberg =

Swedish footballer

Personal information
- Full name: Erik Pär Zetterberg
- Date of birth: 16 February 1997 (age 29)
- Place of birth: Waterloo, Belgium
- Height: 1.87 m (6 ft 2 in)
- Position: Midfielder

Team information
- Current team: Lunds BK
- Number: 6

Youth career
- Royal Stade Brainois
- Falkenbergs FF

Senior career*
Years	Team	Apps	(Gls)
2015–2018	Falkenbergs FF	8	(0)
2018–2019	Varbergs BoIS	6	(0)
2019	→ Tvååkers IF (loan)	8	(0)
2020	FC Edmonton	7	(0)
2021–2022	Lindome GIF	24	(1)
2022–	Lunds BK	65	(3)
- * Club domestic league appearances and goals as of 24 November 2025

Erik Pär Zetterberg (born 16 February 1997) is a Swedish footballer who plays as a midfielder for Lunds BK in Ettan Södra.

== Club career ==
=== Early career ===
Zetterberg began his career in the youth setup of Belgian side Royal Stade Brainois, the same club where Eden and Thorgan Hazard developed.

=== Falkenbergs FF ===
Zetterberg signed his first professional contract with Allsvenskan side Falkenbergs FF in June 2015 after coming through the club's youth system. On 21 February 2016, he made his senior debut in the Svenska Cupen in a 2–0 win over Tenhults IF. He made his league debut on 30 October 2016 in a 4–1 loss to Helsingborg. Zetterberg went on to make two league appearances in total that season.

Zetterberg failed to make a first-team appearance in the 2017 season in the Superettan. The following year, he made six league appearances for Falkenbergs FF before departing mid-season.

=== Varbergs BoIS ===
On 10 July 2018, Zetterberg signed for Superettan side Varbergs BoIS. He made five league appearances for Varberg that season and one appearance each in the league and Svenska Cupen in 2019. On 30 August 2019, Zetterberg was sent on loan to Ettan side Tvååkers IF, where he made eight appearances before the end of the season.

=== FC Edmonton ===
On 5 February 2020, Zetterberg signed with Canadian Premier League side FC Edmonton. He made his debut for the Eddies on August 16 against Forge FC.

=== Lindome GIF ===
On 22 March 2021, Zetterberg returned to Sweden, signing with Ettan side Lindome GIF.

== Personal life ==
Zetterberg is the son of former Swedish international footballer Pär Zetterberg. He was born in Belgium.

== Career statistics ==
As of 4 January 2020.

Club statistics
Club	Season	League			National Cup (Note: Includes appearances in the Svenska Cupen.)		Other		Total	
Club	Season	Division	Apps	Goals	Apps	Goals	Apps	Goals	Apps	Goals
Falkenberg	2015	Allsvenskan	0	0	0	0	0	0	0	0
Falkenberg	2016	Allsvenskan	2	0	1	0	0	0	3	0
Falkenberg	2017	Superettan	0	0	0	0	0	0	0	0
Falkenberg	2018	Superettan	6	0	0	0	0	0	6	0
Falkenberg	Total		8	0	1	0	0	0	9	0
Varbergs BoIS	2018	Superettan	5	0	0	0	0	0	5	0
Varbergs BoIS	2019	Superettan	1	0	1	0	0	0	2	0
Varbergs BoIS	Total		6	0	1	0	0	0	7	0
Tvååkers IF (loan)	2019	Ettan	8	0	0	0	0	0	8	0
Career total			22	0	2	0	0	0	24	0
