= Ben Fisk =

Canadian soccer player

Personal information
- Full name: Benjamin Anthony Fisk-Routledge
- Date of birth: February 4, 1993 (age 33)
- Place of birth: Vancouver, British Columbia, Canada
- Height: 1.78 m (5 ft 10 in)
- Position: Left winger

Youth career
- Grandview Legion
- 2006–2010: Vancouver Whitecaps

Senior career*
Years	Team	Apps	(Gls)
2011–2013	Vancouver Whitecaps U23	27	(8)
2013	→ Charleston Battery (loan)	8	(2)
2014–2015	Coruxo	24	(4)
2015–2016	Deportivo B	21	(0)
2016–2017	FC Edmonton	44	(3)
2018	Derry City	12	(1)
2019	Pacific FC	24	(6)
2020	Atlético Ottawa	7	(1)
2021–2023	Cavalry FC	58	(3)
2024	Vancouver FC	21	(0)
Total		246	(28)

International career
2013	Canada U20	7	(0)
2015–2016	Canada U23	7	(2)
2017	Canada	2	(0)
- * Club domestic league appearances and goals

Benjamin Anthony Fisk-Routledge (born February 4, 1993) is a Canadian retired professional soccer player who played as a left winger.

== Club career ==
=== Vancouver Whitecaps ===
Fisk played for a host of local clubs before joining Vancouver Whitecaps FC's youth setup in 2006. He made his senior debuts in 2011, playing for the club's under-23 squad.

On April 16, 2013, Fisk was loaned to Charleston Battery until the end of the season. He returned to Whitecaps in August, after scoring twice and assisting to a further three goals in nine appearances, being also called up to the main squad for the 2014 pre-season.

=== Coruxo ===
On August 8, 2014, Fisk signed a one-year deal with Spanish Segunda División B side Coruxo FC. He scored his first goals for the club on April 2 of the following year, netting a hat-trick in a 3–1 away win against CD Tropezón.

=== Deportivo B ===
On August 11, 2015, Fisk joined Deportivo de La Coruña, being assigned to the reserves in Tercera División. Fisk was released by the club in June 2016 after one year.

=== FC Edmonton ===
On July 28, 2016, Fisk signed with FC Edmonton of the North American Soccer League. Fisk would spend two seasons with FC Edmonton, before the club ceased operations after the 2017 season.

=== Derry City ===
On June 22, 2018, Fisk signed with Derry City of the League of Ireland Premier Division.

=== Pacific FC ===
On February 7, 2019, Fisk returned to Canada, signing with Canadian Premier League club Pacific FC. He made his debut for Pacific in their inaugural game against on April 28 against HFX Wanderers. Fisk scored his first goal for the club on May 18 against York9. In February 2020 Fisk revealed he would not be returning to the team for the 2020 CPL season.

=== Atlético Ottawa ===
On March 4, 2020, Fisk joined Atlético Ottawa, becoming the club's first-ever signing and inaugural Club Captain. He made his debut in Ottawa's inaugural match on August 15 against York9. He went on to appear in all seven of Ottawa's matches in the shortened 2020 season, and scored a goal in a 2–0 win over Cavalry FC. On February 26, 2021, Fisk was released by the club.

=== Cavalry FC ===
On August 3, 2021, Fisk would sign with fellow CPL club Cavalry FC for the remainder of the 2021 season. In In 20 appearances, Fisk scored 2 goals and 5 assists overall as Cavalry was eliminated in the CPL Playoff semifinals.

In January 2022, Cavalry announced that they had re-signed Fisk for the 2022 and 2023 seasons, with an option for 2024. In 2022, Cavalry were again considered contenders for the CPL championship. Fisk scored his first goal of the year against Valour FC, a last minute winner to make it 2–1, and celebrated with a cowboy hat thrown down to him from the fans in the stands. Fisk would miss the start of the 2023 season due to sciatica, but would return to the starting lineup in the summer before helping the team to the 2023 CPL Regular Season Title by a CPL record margin.

=== Vancouver FC ===
On January 9, 2024, Fisk joined fellow CPL side Vancouver FC on a permanent deal, signing a two-year contract with a club option for 2026; the transfer was part of a transaction between Vancouver and Cavalry that also included a second-round pick trade in the 2024 CPL–U Sports Draft. In the process, Fisk became the first player to sign for four different CPL clubs.

Fisk announced his retirement from professional soccer in January 2025, moving to a new role with Vancouver FC as their Director of Partnerships.

== International career ==
After appearing with the Canada under-20s, Fisk was called up to the main squad for friendlies against Bulgaria and Moldova, but remained as an unused substitute in both matches. He also appeared with the under-23s at the 2015 Pan American Games.

In May 2016, Fisk was called to Canada's U23 national team for a pair of friendlies against Guyana and Grenada. He scored in the match against Guyana.

== Personal life ==
Fisk was born in Vancouver, British Columbia to an English father and a Canadian mother from Nova Scotia.

== Career statistics ==
=== Club ===
As of games played on October 19, 2024

Appearances and goals by club, season and competition
Club	Season	League			Playoffs		National Cup		League Cup		Continental		Total	
Club	Season	League	Apps	Goals	Apps	Goals	Apps	Goals	Apps	Goals	Apps	Goals	Apps	Goals
Vancouver Whitecaps FC	2011	Major League Soccer	0	0	—		0	0	—		—		0	0
Vancouver Whitecaps FC	2012	Major League Soccer	0	0	0	0	0	0	—		—		0	0
Vancouver Whitecaps FC	2013	Major League Soccer	0	0	—		0	0	—		—		0	0
Vancouver Whitecaps FC	Total		0	0	0	0	0	0	—		—		0	0
Charleston Battery (loan)	2013	USL Pro	8	2	1	0	0	0	—		—		9	2
Coruxo	2014–15	Segunda División B	24	4	—		0	0	—		—		24	4
Deportivo B	2015–16	Segunda División B	21	0	—		0	0	—		—		21	0
FC Edmonton	2016	North American Soccer League	15	2	1	0	0	0	—		—		16	2
FC Edmonton	2017	North American Soccer League	29	1	—		1	0	—		—		30	1
FC Edmonton	Total		44	3	1	0	1	0	—		—		46	3
Derry City	2018	League of Ireland Premier Division	12	1	—		1	0	2	0	2 (Note: Appearances in the UEFA Europa League)	0	17	1
Pacific FC	2019	Canadian Premier League	24	6	—		2	0	—		—		26	6
Atlético Ottawa	2020	Canadian Premier League	7	1	—		—		—		—		7	1
Cavalry FC	2021	Canadian Premier League	17	1	1	0	2	1	—		—		20	2
Cavalry FC	2022	Canadian Premier League	26	1	1	0	1	0	—		—		28	1
Cavalry FC	2023	Canadian Premier League	15	1	2	0	0	0	—		—		17	1
Cavalry FC	Total		58	3	4	0	3	1	—		—		65	4
Vancouver FC	2024	Canadian Premier League	21	0	—		1	0	—		—		22	0
Career totals			219	20	6	0	8	1	2	0	2	0	237	21

=== International ===
As of May 18, 2019

Canada national team
Year	Apps	Goals
2017	2	0
Total	2	0
