= Ajay Khabra =

Canadian soccer player

Personal information
- Full name: Ajay Khabra
- Date of birth: 13 June 1995 (age 31)
- Place of birth: Edmonton, Alberta, Canada
- Height: 1.80 m (5 ft 11 in)
- Position: Midfielder

Youth career
- Edmonton Juventus
- FC Edmonton

College career
Years	Team	Apps	(Gls)
2013–2017	Alberta Golden Bears	63	(12)

Senior career*
Years	Team	Apps	(Gls)
2016–2018	Edmonton Green & Gold	32	(8)
2019	FC Edmonton	24	(0)
2020	Atlético Ottawa	6	(0)
Total		62	(8)

Managerial career
- 2021: Atlético Ottawa (assistant)
- * Club domestic league appearances and goals as of 20 February 2021

Ajay Khabra (born 13 June 1995) is a Canadian former professional soccer player.

== Early life ==
Khabra was born in Edmonton, Alberta. Khabra started playing soccer with Edmonton Juventus and won a national championship there in 2009 at the under-14 level. He later joined the academy programme of local professional club FC Edmonton.

== Club career ==
=== Early career ===
From 2013 to 2017, Khabra attended the University of Alberta, making 63 appearances and scoring 12 goals from 2013 to 2017.

While attending university, Khabra played for Alberta Major Soccer League side Edmonton Green & Gold, scoring eight goals in 32 appearances from 2016 to 2018.

=== FC Edmonton ===
On 13 December 2018, Khabra signed with his former youth club FC Edmonton ahead of its first season in the Canadian Premier League. On 4 May 2019, Khabra made his professional debut as a substitute against Valour FC. That season, he made 24 league appearances, including 21 starts.

=== Atlético Ottawa ===
On 9 March 2020, Khabra joined expansion side Atlético Ottawa. On 15 August 2020, he made his debut in Ottawa's inaugural match against York9 and went on to make a total of six appearances for Ottawa that season. On 20 February 2021, Khabra retired from the professional game to pursue further education in the field of rehabilitative medicine.

== Coaching career ==
On 16 March 2021, Khabra rejoined Atlético Ottawa as an assistant coach under manager Mista.

== Career statistics ==
As of 20 February 2021

Club statistics
Club	Season	League			National Cup		Other		Total	
Club	Season	Division	Apps	Goals	Apps	Goals	Apps	Goals	Apps	Goals
Edmonton Green & Gold	2016	AMSL	12	1	—		0	0	12	1
Edmonton Green & Gold	2017	AMSL	10	2	—		0	0	10	2
Edmonton Green & Gold	2018	AMSL	10	5	—		0	0	10	5
Edmonton Green & Gold	Total		32	8	0	0	0	0	32	8
FC Edmonton	2019	Canadian Premier League	24	0	0	0	0	0	24	0
Atlético Ottawa	2020	Canadian Premier League	6	0	0	0	0	0	6	0
Career total			62	8	0	0	0	0	62	8
