= Malyk Hamilton =

Canadian soccer player

Personal information
- Full name: Malyk Hamilton
- Date of birth: September 2, 1999 (age 27)
- Place of birth: Calgary, Alberta, Canada
- Height: 1.73 m (5 ft 8 in)
- Positions: Right-back; winger

Youth career
- Calgary Northern Hills
- Calgary Deerfoot
- Calgary Southwest United
- Calgary Foothills
- 2011–2018: West Ham United

Senior career*
Years	Team	Apps	(Gls)
2018	Toronto FC III	6	(1)
2018	Toronto FC II	2	(0)
2019	Cavalry FC	18	(0)
2020	Atlético Ottawa	7	(0)
2021	North Carolina FC	10	(0)

International career
2017	Canada U18	2	(1)
- * Club domestic league appearances and goals as of December 4, 2021

Malyk Hamilton (born September 2, 1999) is a Canadian professional soccer player who most recently played for North Carolina FC of USL League One.

== Club career ==
=== Early career ===
Hamilton began playing soccer in Calgary with Calgary Northern Hills, before moving on to Calgary Deerfoot and then Calgary Southwest United.

=== West Ham United ===
Hamilton joined the West Ham United Academy at the U-12 level and made 25 appearances in the U-18 Premier League. He also made a brief appearance in the Premier League 2.

In March 2018, Hamilton left West Ham.

=== Toronto FC II ===
Shortly after leaving West Ham, Hamilton signed with Toronto FC II. On December 20, 2018 Hamilton was released by Toronto FC.

=== Cavalry FC ===
On March 6, 2019 Hamilton signed with his hometown Canadian Premier League club Cavalry FC. Hamilton would not be listed on Cavalry's training camp roster for the 2020 season, as he decided to leave the club for another opportunity/offer.

=== Atlético Ottawa ===
On March 6, 2020, Hamilton signed with Atlético Ottawa. He made his debut on August 15 against York9. In the shortened 2020 season, he played in every single minute of action for the club.Hamilton was offered an extended contract with the club but made the decision to move and accept a USL offer.

=== North Carolina FC ===
On February 22, 2021, Hamilton signed with North Carolina FC of USL League One. Upon completion of the 2021 season, North Carolina would announce that Hamilton's option would not be picked up, due to an injury making him a free agent.

== International career ==
In October 2016, Hamilton made his debut and scored in a Canada U18 game, led by Rob Gale.

== Personal life ==
Hamilton was born in Calgary, Alberta. He is a cousin of English professional footballers Marvin Bartley and Mitchell Thomas.

== Honours ==
Calvary FC

- Canadian Premier League Finals
  - Runners-up: 2019
- Canadian Premier League (Regular season):
  - Champions: Spring 2019, Fall 2019
