= Víctor Blasco =

Spanish footballer (born 1994)

Personal information
- Full name: Victor Blasco Llorens
- Date of birth: 1 July 1994 (age 32)
- Place of birth: Barcelona, Spain
- Height: 1.78 m (5 ft 10 in)
- Positions: Winger; attacking midfielder

Youth career
- 2003–2007: Barcelona
- Cornellà
- Mallorca

College career
Years	Team	Apps	(Gls)
2014	VIU Mariners		
2016–2018	VIU Mariners		

Senior career*
Years	Team	Apps	(Gls)
2015–2016	Whitecaps 2	24	(4)
2016–2017	VIU Mariners		
2018–2019	CCB LFC United		
2019–2021	Pacific FC	49	(9)
2022	Vida	14	(1)
2022	Preah Khan Reach Svay Rieng	18	(2)
2023	Angkor Tiger	9	(4)
2023–2024	Visakha	19	(7)
2024–2025	Balzan	16	(1)
2025-2026	Hougang United	21	(3)
- * Club domestic league appearances and goals as of 26 June 2025

Victor Blasco Llorens (born 1 July 1994), better known as Blasco, is a Spanish professional footballer who plays primarily as a winger most recently for Singapore Premier League club Hougang United. He is known for his speed, dribbling and power shots. Primarily a winger, Blasco is also capable of being deployed as an attacking-midfielder or central-midfielder.

== Career ==
=== Early career ===
Born in Barcelona, Catalonia, Blasco spent his youth career with Barcelona, Cornellà and Mallorca before moving to Canada to play university football at Vancouver Island University. In the 2014 season with the Mariners, he led the PACWEST with 12 goals in 13 appearances and was named 2014 PACWEST Rookie of the Year and Player of the Year.

=== Whitecaps 2 ===
On 25 March 2015, Blasco signed a professional contract with USL expansion club Whitecaps 2. He made his professional debut on 29 March in a 4–0 defeat to Seattle Sounders 2. Blasco was released by Vancouver on 19 April 2016 for an undisclosed breach of club policy.

=== Pacific ===
After returning to VIU, and playing in the PCSL and the VMSL, Blasco signed with new club Pacific FC of the Canadian Premier League on 7 February 2019. In 25 games, Blasco scored six goals and three assists in the 2019 Canadian Premier League season, which was also the first season in league history, and also appeared in one Canadian Championship match. Pacific finished in fifth in the spring season and fourth in the fall season, not qualifying for the finals. After Blasco's successful 2021 season, where Pacific captured the championship, he departed the club.

=== Vida ===
On 16 December 2021, Blasco signed with Honduran Liga Nacional club Vida.

=== Preah Khan Reach Svay Rieng ===
On 10 June 2022, it was announced that Blasco signed with Preah Khan Reach Svay Rieng who's playing in Cambodian Premier League. He joins his former teammate at Pacific, Marcus Haber.

== Career statistics ==
=== Club ===
As of 25 May 2024

Club	Season	League			FA Cup		League Cup		UEFA Cup		Total	
Club	Season	Division	Apps	Goals	Apps	Goals	Apps	Goals	Apps	Goals	Apps	Goals
Pacific	2019	Canadian Premier League	26	6	0	0	0	0	0	0	26	6
Pacific	2020	Canadian Premier League	10	2	0	0	0	0	0	0	10	2
Pacific	2021	Canadian Premier League	17	1	0	0	0	0	0	0	17	1
Pacific	Total		53	9	0	0	0	0	0	0	53	9
Vida	2021–22	Liga Nacional de Guatemala	14	1	0	0	0	0	0	0	14	1
Vida	Total		14	1	0	0	0	0	0	0	14	1
Svay Rieng	2022	Cambodian Premier League	19	2	0	0	0	0	0	0	19	2
Svay Rieng	Total		19	2	0	0	0	0	0	0	19	2
Angkor Tiger	2023–24	Cambodian Premier League	9	4	0	0	0	0	0	0	9	4
Angkor Tiger	Total		9	4	0	0	0	0	0	0	9	4
Visakha	2023–24	Cambodian Premier League	17	7	0	0	0	0	0	0	17	7
Visakha	2024–25	Cambodian Premier League	2	0	0	0	0	0	0	0	2	0
Visakha	Total		19	7	0	0	0	0	0	0	19	7
Balzan	2024–25	Maltese Premier League	16	1	0	0	0	0	0	0	16	1
Balzan	Total		16	1	0	0	0	0	0	0	16	1
Hougang United	2025–26	Singapore Premier League	0	0	0	0	0	0	0	0	0	0
Hougang United	Total		0	0	0	0	0	0	0	0	0	0
Career total			130	24	0	0	0	0	0	0	130	24

== Honours ==
Individual

- CCAA All-Canadian: 2014
- PACWEST 1st-Team All Star: 2014
- PACWEST Rookie of the Year: 2014
- PACWEST Player of the Year: 2014

Pacific FC

- Canadian Premier League: 2021
