= Bernardinho (footballer) =

Ghanaian footballer

Personal information
- Full name: Osah Bernardinho Tetteh
- Date of birth: 2 July 1996 (age 30)
- Place of birth: Accra, Ghana
- Positions: Winger; attacking midfielder

Team information
- Current team: Atlético Ottawa
- Number: 7

Youth career
- Afienya City
- 2012–2016: Attram de Visser

Senior career*
Years	Team	Apps	(Gls)
2017	Great Olympics		
2017–2020	Westerlo	14	(0)
2018–2019	→ ASV Geel (loan)	29	(6)
2019	→ Heist (loan)	14	(2)
2020–	Atlético Ottawa	0	(0)
- * Club domestic league appearances and goals as of 20:13, 1 April 2020 (UTC)

Osah Bernardinho Tetteh (born 2 July 1996), commonly known as Bernardinho, is a Ghanaian professional footballer who plays as a forward for Canadian club Atlético Ottawa.

== Club career ==
=== Early career ===
Bernardinho began his youth career with Ghanaian side Afienya City, before being scouted by Godwin Attram, who recruited him to Attram De Visser Soccer Academy at age sixteen. In 2017, he played for Ghana Premier League club Accra Great Olympics.

In May 2017, he impressed on trial with Dutch Eredivisie side Willem II, but wasn't offered a contract due to regulations on non-EU players.

=== Westerlo ===
In July 2017, Bernardinho signed a three-year contract with Belgian First Division B side Westerlo. He made his professional debut on 12 August 2017 in a league match against Tubize. On 27 August, he scored his first goal for Westerlo in a Belgian Cup match against Toekomst Menen. Bernardinho made a total of fourteen league appearances that season and two in the Belgian Cup.

==== Loan to ASV Geel ====
On 14 August 2018, Bernardinho was sent on a season-long loan to Belgian First Amateur Division side ASV Geel. He made 29 league appearances that year, scoring six goals, and made one appearance in the Belgian Cup.

==== Loan to Heist ====
On 2 July 2019, Bernardinho was sent on another season-long loan to the Belgian third tier, this time with Heist.

=== Atlético Ottawa ===
On 1 April 2020, Bernardinho signed with Canadian Premier League side Atlético Ottawa.

== Career statistics ==
As of 17 March 2020

Club statistics
Club	Season	League			National Cup (Note: Includes appearances in the Belgian Cup.)		Continental		Other		Total	
Club	Season	Division	Apps	Goals	Apps	Goals	Apps	Goals	Apps	Goals	Apps	Goals
Westerlo	2017–18	Belgian First Division B	14	0	2	1	—		0	0	16	1
ASV Geel (loan)	2018–19	Belgian First Amateur Division	29	6	1	0	—		0	0	30	6
Heist (loan)	2019–20	Belgian First Amateur Division	14	2	1	0	—		0	0	15	2
Atlético Ottawa	2020	Canadian Premier League	0	0	0	0	—		0	0	0	0
Career total			57	8	4	1	0	0	0	0	61	9
