= Peter Schaale =

German footballer

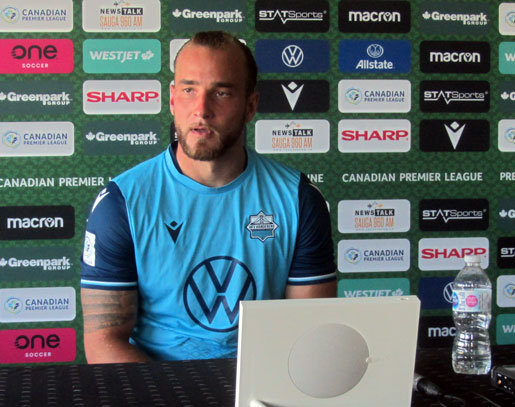
- Schaale in 2021

Personal information
- Date of birth: 14 June 1996 (age 30)
- Place of birth: Wittlich, Germany
- Height: 1.91 m (6 ft 3 in)
- Position: Centre-back

Youth career
- 1999–2002: Rendel
- 2002–2009: Wittlich
- 2009–2012: Eintracht Trier
- 2012–2013: 1. FC Köln
- 2013–2015: Viktoria Köln

College career
Years	Team	Apps	(Gls)
2016–2019	CBU Capers	46	(11)

Senior career*
Years	Team	Apps	(Gls)
2015–2016	Köln-Worringen	15	(1)
2018	Victoria Highlanders	12	(0)
2019–2022	HFX Wanderers	68	(2)
- * Club domestic league appearances and goals as of 9 October 2022

Peter Schaale (born 14 June 1996) is a German professional footballer.

== Club career ==
=== Early career ===
Until 2009, Schaale played for the academy of local club SV Wittlich. That year, he joined the academy of Regionalliga side SV Eintracht Trier. In July 2012, Schaale switched to the academy of 2. Bundesliga side 1. FC Köln. In 2014–15, Schaale played for the academy of Regionalliga side FC Viktoria Köln and made 24 appearances in the Under 19 Bundesliga that season, scoring two goals. In 2015–16, he played his first season of senior football with German Landesliga Mittelrhein side SG Köln-Worringen.

In 2016, Schaale moved to Canada to attend Cape Breton University in Nova Scotia. In three seasons with the CBU Capers he made a total of 35 appearances and scored nine goals. On 8 November 2018, he was named Atlantic University Sport Men's Soccer MVP and was later named Cape Breton University Male Athlete of the Year.

=== Victoria Highlanders ===
In 2018, Schaale played for Premier Development League side Victoria Highlanders, making twelve appearances.

=== HFX Wanderers ===
On 14 November 2018, Schaale was selected in the first round of the CPL–U Sports Draft, fifth overall by HFX Wanderers. On 29 March 2019, Schaale officially signed with Halifax. He made his debut on 28 April 2019 as a starter in the Wanderers' inaugural match. On 30 May 2019, he scored his first professional goal in the 15th minute of a 1–1 draw against York9. Schaale made seventeen league appearances that season and another five in the Canadian Championship. In mid August 2019, Schaale left the club to complete his studies at Cape Breton University in the fall.

On 12 December 2019, Schaale re-signed with Halifax for the 2020 season. After the 2022 CPL season, Schaale's contract option was declined by the Wanderers, ending his time with the club.

== Personal life ==
Schaale was born in Wittlich, Rhineland-Palatinate and lived in Frankfurt for the first five years of his life when his father worked for Eintracht Frankfurt, after which his family moved back to Wittlich.

== Honours ==
HFX Wanderers

- Canadian Premier League runner-up: 2020

Individual

- AUS Most Valuable Player: 2018, 2019
- Cape Breton University Male Athlete of the Year: 2018
