= Viti Martínez =

Spanish footballer (born 1997)

Personal information
- Full name: Víctor Martínez Manrique
- Date of birth: 3 June 1997 (age 29)
- Place of birth: Mataró, Spain
- Height: 1.84 m (6 ft 0 in)
- Position: Midfielder

Youth career
- 2003–2009: Cirera
- 2009–2010: Premià
- 2010: Mataró
- 2010–2011: Cirera
- 2011–2013: Calella
- 2013–2015: Damm
- 2015–2016: Sabadell

Senior career*
Years	Team	Apps	(Gls)
2016–2017	Sabadell B	33	(2)
2017–2018	Sabadell	22	(2)
2018-2019	Pobla Mafumet	10	(0)
2019–2020	Gimnàstic	23	(1)
2020–2021	Atlético Ottawa	19	(2)
2020–2021	→ Alavés B (loan)	11	(1)
2022–2025	Inter d'Escaldes	65	(7)
2025	Nakhon Ratchasima	11	(0)
- * Club domestic league appearances and goals as of 31 December 2025

Víctor "Viti" Martínez Manrique (born 3 June 1997) is a Spanish professional footballer who plays as a central midfielder.

== Early life ==
Born in Mataró, Barcelona, Catalonia, Viti represented UD Cirera, CE Premià, CE Mataró, FP Calella, CF Damm and CE Sabadell FC as a youth.

== Club career ==
=== Sabadell ===
On 15 July 2016, was promoted to Sabadell's reserve side in the Tercera División. Viti made his first team debut for the Arquelinats on 20 August 2017, playing the last four minutes in a 0–0 Segunda División B home draw against Elche CF. He scored his first goal for the club on 14 October, netting the opener in a 1–1 draw at Atlético Saguntino, and finished the campaign with two goals in 22 appearances for the main squad.

=== Gimnàstic ===
On 6 July 2018, Viti joined Gimnàstic de Tarragona and was assigned to the club's farm team, CF Pobla de Mafumet, in the fourth division. He made his professional debut on 17 November 2018, starting in a 0–2 away loss against Málaga CF in the Segunda División.

=== Atlético Ottawa ===
On 7 April 2020, Martínez signed with Canadian Premier League expansion side Atlético Ottawa. He made his debut in Ottawa's inaugural match on August 15 against York9. On 7 October 2020, Martínez was sent on loan to Deportivo Alavés for the Canadian off-season, where he joined the club's B team in the Segunda División B. He returned from loan on 29 January 2021, after making eleven appearances and scoring one goal for Alavés B. On 13 January 2022, Ottawa elected not to exercise its contract option on Martínez.

== Career statistics ==
As of 25 June 2022

Club statistics
Club	Season	League			National Cup (Note: Includes appearances in the Copa del Rey.)		Continental (Note: Includes appearances in UEFA Champions League.)		Other (Note: Includes appearances in the Copa Catalunya.)		Total	
Club	Season	Division	Apps	Goals	Apps	Goals	Apps	Goals	Apps	Goals	Apps	Goals
Sabadell B	2016–17	Tercera División	33	2	—		—		0	0	33	2
Sabadell	2017–18	Segunda División B	22	2	—		—		1	0	23	2
Pobla Mafumet	2018–19	Tercera División	10	0	—		—		0	0	10	0
Gimnàstic	2018–19	Segunda División	14	0	0	0	—		1	0	15	0
Gimnàstic	2019–20	Segunda División B	9	1	1	0	—		1	0	11	1
Gimnàstic	Total		23	1	1	0	0	0	2	0	26	1
Atlético Ottawa	2020	Canadian Premier League	6	1	—		—		—		6	1
Atlético Ottawa	2020	Canadian Premier League	13	1	1	0	—		—		14	1
Atlético Ottawa	Total		19	2	1	0	0	0	0	0	20	2
Alavés B (loan)	2020–21	Segunda División B	11	1	—		—		0	0	11	1
Inter d'Escaldes	2021–22	Andorran Primera Divisió	4	1	0	0	0	0	0	0	4	1
Inter d'Escaldes	2022–23	Andorran Primera Divisió	0	0	0	0	2	0	0	0	2	0
Inter d'Escaldes	Total		4	1	0	0	2	0	0	0	6	1
Career total			122	9	2	0	2	0	3	0	129	9
