= Gabriel Vasconcelos (footballer, born 1996) =

Brazilian footballer

Personal information
- Full name: Gabriel Monteiro Vasconcelos
- Date of birth: 15 March 1996 (age 30)
- Place of birth: Porto Velho, Brazil
- Height: 1.75 m (5 ft 9 in)
- Position: Forward

Team information
- Current team: Bahrain SC

Youth career
- 2006–2014: Fluminense
- 2014–2016: Corinthians

Senior career*
Years	Team	Apps	(Gls)
2016–2019	Corinthians	0	(0)
2016	→ America-RJ (loan)	9	(2)
2016	→ Joinville (loan)	6	(0)
2017	→ Oeste (loan)	30	(3)
2018	→ Ponte Preta (loan)	12	(0)
2018	→ São Bento (loan)	5	(0)
2019	→ Oeste (loan)	11	(0)
2020	York9	2	(0)
2021	Sampaio Corrêa	5	(0)
2021–2023	Al-Ittihad	0	(0)
2023–	Bahrain SC	1	(1)
- * Club domestic league appearances and goals as of 25 February 2021

Gabriel Monteiro Vasconcelos (born 15 March 1996) is a Brazilian professional footballer who plays as a forward in Bahrain SC

== Club career ==
=== Corinthians ===
Born in Porto Velho, Vasconcelos joined the youth setup of Fluminense at the age of 12. In May 2014, he switched to the Corinthians academy. While playing with the under-20 team, he emerged as the top scorer of 2015 Copa São Paulo de Futebol Júnior, Campeonato Paulista besides winning the under-20 edition of 2014 Série A. In January 2016, he was promoted to the first team and signed a contract until September 2017.

==== America-RJ ====
Deemed surplus to the club's requirements, Vasconcelos was loaned to America-RJ on 18 February 2016 in order to get more first team opportunities. In March, he scored a brace (his first goals in professional football) in a 2–1 victory against Cabofriense.

==== Joinville ====
On 3 June 2016, he was loaned to Joinville for their Série B campaign. However, after the appointment of Lisca as the club's manager, he was rarely used. Subsequently, he was recalled from loan by Corinthians in August.

==== Oeste ====
On 30 May 2017, Vasconcelos was loaned to Oeste of the same tier for the whole season. An undisputed starter, he played both as a false 9 and as a winger during his stint at the club. He contributed with three goals in 30 matches, which included a brace against Paraná.

==== Later loans ====
On 12 January 2018, Vasconcelos joined Ponte Preta on a season long loan deal after renewing his contract with parent club until 2019. After struggling to get playing time, he left the club on 26 July. On the following day, he moved to São Bento on a temporary deal.

=== York9 ===
On January 21, 2020, Vasconcelos signed with Canadian Premier League side York9. He made his debut for the Nine Stripes on August 15 against Atlético Ottawa. After that season, his contract option was turned down after making two appearances for the club.

=== Sampaio Corrêa ===
On 18 February 2021, Vasconcelos returned to Brazil, signing with Série B side Sampaio Corrêa.

== Career statistics ==
As of match played on 6 September 2020

Club	Season	League			State League		Cup		Total	
Club	Season	Division	Apps	Goals	Apps	Goals	Apps	Goals	Apps	Goals
America (loan)	2016	Carioca A1	—		9	2	—		9	2
Joinville (loan)	2016	Série B	6	0	0	0	0	0	6	0
Oeste (loan)	2017	Série B	30	3	0	0	0	0	30	3
Ponte Preta (loan)	2018	Série B	1	0	10	0	1	0	12	0
São Bento (loan)	2018	Série B	5	0	0	0	—		5	0
Oeste (loan)	2019	Série B	11	0	0	0	0	0	11	0
York9	2020	Canadian Premier League	2	0	0	0	0	0	2	0
Career total			55	3	19	2	1	0	75	5
