= Vashon Neufville =

English footballer

Personal information
- Full name: Vashon Linden Dita Neufville
- Date of birth: 18 July 1999 (age 27)
- Place of birth: Islington, England
- Height: 5 ft 8 in (1.73 m)
- Position: Left back

Youth career
- –2012: Chelsea
- 2012–2018: West Ham United

Senior career*
Years	Team	Apps	(Gls)
2018–2019	West Ham United	0	(0)
2019	→ Newport County (loan)	1	(0)
2020–2021	Atlético Ottawa	18	(0)
2022	Walton Casuals		

International career^{‡}
2014	England U16	1	(0)
2014–2015	England U17	8	(0)
- * Club domestic league appearances and goals as of 15:47, 31 December 2021 (UTC) ‡ National team caps and goals as of 11:14, 5 January 2019 (UTC)

Vashon Linden Dita Neufville (born 18 July 1999) is an English professional footballer who last played as a left back for Walton Casuals.

== Club career ==
=== West Ham United ===
Neufville joined West Ham United at under-14 level from Chelsea, signing his first professional contract at the club in July 2016. On 4 January 2019, Neufville moved on loan to Newport County. He made his professional debut for Newport on 6 January 2019, in an FA Cup Third Round 2–1 win against Leicester City. Following two appearances for Newport, his loan period was terminated early on 3 April 2019. He was released by West Ham at the end of the 2018–19 season.

=== Atlético Ottawa ===
Neufville signed with Canadian Premier League side Atlético Ottawa on 24 March 2020. He made his debut on 15 August against York9, where he earned an assist on Ottawa's first ever goal and was also sent off as both teams played to a 2–2 draw.

=== Walton Casuals ===
In March 2022, he returned to England, signing with Walton Casuals.

Neufville was released by the club due to Walton Casuals being wound up in June 2022.

== International career ==
He has represented England at under-16 and under-17 youth international levels.

== Career statistics ==
As of 31 December 2021

Appearances and goals by club, season and competition
Club	Season	League			National Cup		League Cup		Other		Total	
Club	Season	Division	Apps	Goals	Apps	Goals	Apps	Goals	Apps	Goals	Apps	Goals
West Ham United	2018–19	Premier League	0	0	0	0	0	0	0	0	0	0
Newport County (loan)	2018–19	League Two	1	0	1	0	0	0	0	0	2	0
Atlético Ottawa	2020	Canadian Premier League	5	0	—		—		—		5	0
Atlético Ottawa	2021	Canadian Premier League	13	0	0	0	—		—		13	0
Atlético Ottawa	Total		18	0	0	0	0	0	0	0	18	0
Career total			19	0	1	0	0	0	0	0	20	0
