= List of Canadian Premier League transfers 2021 =

This is a list of transfers for the 2021 Canadian Premier League season.

This list includes all transfers involving Canadian Premier League clubs after their last match of the 2020 Canadian Premier League season and before their last match of the 2021 season.

== Transfers ==
Clubs without flags are Canadian.

Date	Name	Moving from	Moving to	Fee
24 September 2020	(Spain) José Galán	Valour FC	(Spain) Villarrobledo	Undisclosed
28 September 2020	(Jamaica) Nicholas Hamilton	York United	(Scotland) Dundee	Loan
4 October 2020	(Canada) Easton Ongaro	FC Edmonton	(Denmark) Vendsyssel FF	Loan
5 October 2020	(Canada) Michael Petrasso	York United	(England) Barnet	Loan
5 October 2020 (Note: Julian Ulbricht signed a pre-contract to join York United in early 2021 after his contract with 1. FC Phönix Lübeck expires.)	(Germany) Julian Ulbricht	(Germany) Hamburger SV II	York United	Free
7 October 2020	(Honduras) José Escalante	Cavalry FC	(Honduras) Vida	Loan
7 October 2020	(Canada) Emil Gazdov	Pacific FC	(Germany) 1. FC Nürnberg	Loan
7 October 2020	(Spain) Viti Martínez	Atlético Ottawa	(Spain) Alavés B	Loan
10 October 2020	(Peru) Raúl Tito	FC Edmonton	(Peru) Santos Nasca	Loan
20 October 2020	(Argentina) Mateo Hernández	(Argentina) Colón	York United	Free
21 October 2020	(Canada) Ryan Lindsay	(Slovakia) Pohronie	York United	Free
22 October 2020	(England) Jordan Brown	Cavalry FC	(Germany) VfR Aalen	Free
22 October 2020	(Canada) Jordan Wilson	(Denmark) Nykøbing	York United	Free
28 October 2020	(Canada) Maksym Kowal	Atlético Ottawa	(Germany) Germania Halberstadt	Free
4 November 2020	(Canada) Felix N'sa	Panellinios	York United	Free
5 November 2020	(Canada) Chrisnovic N'sa	HFX Wanderers	York United	Free
6 November 2020	(Canada) Manny Aparicio	York United	Pacific FC	Free
10 November 2020	(Canada) Niko Giantsopoulos	Cavalry FC	York United	Free
11 November 2020	(Canada) Cédric Toussaint	CF Montréal	York United	Free
12 November 2020	(Brazil) William Wallace	(Brazil) Fluminense	York United	Undisclosed
18 November 2020	(Argentina) Lisandro Cabrera	(Argentina) Newell's Old Boys	York United	Free
20 November 2020	(Canada) Joseph Di Chiara	York United	Cavalry FC	Free
3 December 2020	(Brazil) Jacó	York United	(Brazil) Grêmio Anápolis	Free
6 December 2020	(Peru) Jair Córdova	Cavalry FC	(Peru) Alianza Universidad	Free
10 December 2020	(Canada) Paris Gee	(United States) Saint Louis FC	FC Edmonton	Free
10 December 2020	(United States) Ahinga Selemani	(Gibraltar) Lincoln Red Imps	Cavalry FC	Free
15 December 2020	(Colombia) Sebastián Gutiérrez	(Colombia) Llaneros	York United	Free
16 December 2020	(Canada) Julian Altobelli	York United	Toronto FC II	Free
23 December 2020	(Canada) Kyle Porter	York United	FC Edmonton	Free
24 December 2020	(Canada) Fraser Aird	Valour FC	FC Edmonton	Free
28 December 2020	(Republic of Ireland) Tom Field	(Scotland) Dundee	Cavalry FC	Free
30 December 2020	(Argentina) Matías Roskopf	(Romania) Universitatea Cluj	Cavalry FC	Free
4 January 2021	(Canada) Shamit Shome	CF Montréal	FC Edmonton	Free
5 January 2021	(Mexico) Francisco Acuña	Atlético Ottawa	(Mexico) Necaxa	Free
6 January 2021	(Canada) Morey Doner	York United	HFX Wanderers	Free
7 January 2021	(Democratic Republic of the Congo) Sharly Mabussi	(France) Bergerac Foot	FC Edmonton	Free
7 January 2021	(Venezuela) Ronny Maza	(Venezuela) Trujillanos	Valour FC	Free
13 January 2021	(Canada) Kieran Baskett	Unattached	HFX Wanderers	Free
18 January 2021	(Canada) Marcus Haber	Cavalry FC	(Cambodia) Visakha	Free
20 January 2021	(Canada) Jérémy Gagnon-Laparé	(United States) Saint Louis FC	HFX Wanderers	Free
21 January 2021	(Canada) Tyson Farago	Unattached	Cavalry FC	Free
25 January 2021	(England) Nathan Mavila	Cavalry FC	(Sweden) Brage	Free
27 January 2021	(Netherlands) Daan Klomp	(Netherlands) NAC Breda	Cavalry FC	Free
27 January 2021	(Canada) Pierre Lamothe	Blainville	HFX Wanderers	Free
27 January 2021	(Peru) Jared Ulloa	(Peru) Sporting Cristal	Valour FC	Loan
1 February 2021	(Canada) Dominick Zator	Cavalry FC	York United	Free
2 February 2021	(Canada) Keven Alemán	FC Edmonton	Valour FC	Free
2 February 2021	(Canada) Keven Alemán	Valour FC	(Costa Rica) Guadalupe	Loan
2 February 2021	(Costa Rica) Néstor Monge	(Costa Rica) Jicaral	Valour FC	Free
2 February 2021	(Canada) Dominick Zator	York United	(Sweden) Vasalunds IF	Loan
3 February 2021	(Canada) Keesean Ferdinand	CF Montréal	Atlético Ottawa	Loan
3 February 2021	(Canada) Karifa Yao	CF Montréal	Cavalry FC	Loan
4 February 2021	(Trinidad and Tobago) Kareem Moses	FC Edmonton	(Finland) VPS	Free
4 February 2021	(Canada) Noah Verhoeven	Pacific FC	York United	Free
5 February 2021	(Zimbabwe) Darlington Murasiranwa	Unattached	FC Edmonton	Free
9 February 2021	(Japan) Wataru Murofushi	York United	(South Korea) Bucheon	Free
10 February 2021	(Canada) Samuel Salter	Blainville	HFX Wanderers	Free
10 February 2021	(Mali) Aboubacar Sissoko	HFX Wanderers	(United States) Indy Eleven	Free
12 February 2021	(Canada) Tomas Giraldo	CF Montréal	FC Edmonton	Loan
12 February 2021	(Canada) Anthony Novak	Forge FC	(Portugal) Condeixa	Free
13 February 2021	(Canada) Marcel Zajac	Forge FC	(Poland) Watra Białka	Free
18 February 2021	(Brazil) Gabriel Vasconcelos	York United	(Brazil) Sampaio Corrêa	Free
19 February 2021	(Germany) Tobias Warschewski	(Germany) Phönix Lübeck	FC Edmonton	Free
22 February 2021	(Canada) Malyk Hamilton	Atlético Ottawa	(United States) North Carolina FC	Free
25 February 2021	(Canada) Matteo Polisi	Unattached	Pacific FC	Free
2 March 2021	(Canada) David Norman Jr.	(United States) Inter Miami	Cavalry FC	Free
3 March 2021	(Canada) Diego Gutiérrez	Valour FC	(Chile) Barnechea	Free
5 March 2021	(Canada) Tristan Borges	(Belgium) OH Leuven	Forge FC	Loan
8 March 2021	(England) Aribim Pepple	Cavalry FC	(Spain) Getafe	Free
11 March 2021	(Canada) Kunle Dada-Luke	Atlético Ottawa	Pacific FC	Free
13 March 2021	(Canada) Jace Kotsopoulos	York United	Guelph United	Free
14 March 2021	(Canada) Alex De Carolis	HFX Wanderers	(Sweden) IFK Eskilstuna	Free
18 March 2021	(Argentina) Lisandro Cabrera	York United	(Dominican Republic) Atlético Pantoja	Loan
18 March 2021	(Canada) Duran Lee	FC Edmonton	Pacific FC	Free
22 March 2021	(Sweden) Erik Zetterberg	FC Edmonton	(Sweden) Lindome GIF	Free
23 March 2021	(Canada) Thomas Gardner	Unattached	FC Edmonton	Draft
2 April 2021	(Canada) David Doe	FC Edmonton	(United States) South Bend Lions	Free
6 April 2021	(Canada) Chris Mannella	York United	Atlético Ottawa	Free
6 April 2021	(Canada) Sean Rea	CF Montréal	Valour FC	Loan
6 April 2021	(Canada) Jonathan Sirois	CF Montréal	Valour FC	Loan
8 April 2021	(Canada) Dylon Powley	FC Edmonton	Atlético Ottawa	Free
9 April 2021	(Canada) Shaan Hundal	Valour FC	(United States) Fort Lauderdale	Free
13 April 2021	(Canada) Jordan Webb	(Singapore) Tampines Rovers	Atlético Ottawa	Free
15 April 2021	(Canada) Zach Verhoven	Pacific FC	Atlético Ottawa	Free
20 April 2021	(Canada) Anthony Novak	(Portugal) Condeixa	Cavalry FC	Free
22 April 2021	(Serbia) Teodor Obadal	(Serbia) Lokomotiva Belgrade	Atlético Ottawa	Free
24 April 2021	(Argentina) Matías Roskopf	Cavalry FC	(Uruguay) Central Español	Free
27 April 2021	(Canada) Brian Wright	(United States) Birmingham Legion	Atlético Ottawa	Free
29 April 2021	(Northern Ireland) Ollie Bassett	(England) Nuneaton Borough	Pacific FC	Free
29 April 2021	(Jamaica) Shawn-Claud Lawson	(United States) Detroit City	Atlético Ottawa	Free
4 May 2021	(Canada) Drew Beckie	(United States) El Paso Locomotive	Atlético Ottawa	Free
5 May 2021	(Canada) William Akio	(United States) University of Texas RGV	Valour FC	Free
10 May 2021	(Republic of Ireland) Joe Mason	(England) Milton Keynes Dons	Cavalry FC	Free
12 May 2021	(Argentina) Mateo Hernández	York United	(Dominican Republic) Atlético Pantoja	Loan
13 May 2021	(Canada) Dejan Jaković	(United States) Los Angeles FC	Forge FC	Free
20 May 2021	(Spain) Miguel Acosta	(Spain) Atlético Baleares	Atlético Ottawa	Free
20 May 2021	(Netherlands) Gianni dos Santos	(Netherlands) Dordrecht	Pacific FC	Free
2 June 2021	(Argentina) Lisandro Cabrera	York United	(Costa Rica) Guadalupe	Loan
2 June 2021	(Argentina) Mateo Hernández	York United	(Costa Rica) Guadalupe	Loan
3 June 2021	(Canada) Jordan Faria	Toronto FC II	York United	Free
3 June 2021	(Brazil) Rafael Galhardo	(Brazil) Vasco da Gama	Valour FC	Free
3 June 2021	(Dominican Republic) Gerard Lavergne	(United States) Tucson	York United	Undisclosed
3 June 2021	(Canada) Terique Mohammed	(Republic of Ireland) Dundalk	York United	Loan
3 June 2021	(Mexico) Osvaldo Ramírez	(Mexico) Cancún	York United	Free
9 June 2021	(United States) Hunter Gorskie	(United States) San Antonio FC	FC Edmonton	Free
10 June 2021	(Canada) Stefan Karajovanovic	Ottawa South United	HFX Wanderers	Draft
10 June 2021	(Canada) Chris Lee	Unattached	Pacific FC	Draft
10 June 2021	(Dominican Republic) Rafael Núñez	(Spain) Atlético Madrid	Atlético Ottawa	Loan
10 June 2021	(Mexico) Rodrigo Reyes	(Mexico) Guadalajara	Valour FC	Loan
10 June 2021	(Spain) Nacho Zabal	Atlético Ottawa	(Andorra) Sant Julià	Free
11 June 2021	(Lebanon) Tony Mikhael	Unattached	Valour FC	Draft
11 June 2021	(Canada) Marcello Polisi	Unattached	HFX Wanderers	Free
11 June 2021	(Canada) Kareem Sow	Unattached	HFX Wanderers	Draft
14 June 2021	(United States) Roberto Avila	(United States) Austin Bold	FC Edmonton	Loan
15 June 2021	(Costa Rica) Joshua Navarro	(Costa Rica) Pérez Zeledón	Forge FC	Loan
16 June 2021	(Panama) Omar Browne	(Panama) Independiente	Forge FC	Loan
16 June 2021	(Costa Rica) Néstor Monge	Valour FC	(Guatemala) Guastatoya	Free
18 June 2021	(Canada) Daniel Kaiser	Unattached	Cavalry FC	Free
18 June 2021	(Canada) Victor Loturi	Unattached	Cavalry FC	Draft
21 June 2021	(Somalia) Ali Musse	(Germany) FCA Darmstadt	Cavalry FC	Free
22 June 2021	(Spain) Alberto Soto	(Spain) Atlético Madrid B	Atlético Ottawa	Loan
23 June 2021	(Canada) Garven Metusala	Blainville	Forge FC	Draft
23 June 2021	(Nigeria) Kosi Nwafornso	Unattached	Forge FC	Free
24 June 2021	(Canada) Robbie Cleary	Sigma FC	Forge FC	Free
24 June 2021	(Canada) Santiago Frias	Sigma FC	Forge FC	Free
24 June 2021	(Canada) Johnny Son	Sigma FC	Forge FC	Free
26 June 2021	(Cuba) Andy Baquero	Unattached	Valour FC	Free
2 July 2021	(Algeria) Chakib Hocine	Valour FC	Mont-Royal Outremont	Free
6 July 2021	(Canada) Matthew Durrans	(Germany) 1860 Munich	FC Edmonton	Free
28 July 2021	(Spain) Raúl Uche	(Spain) Real Valladolid B	Atlético Ottawa	Free
30 July 2021	(Canada) Marcus Caldeira	Sigma FC	Forge FC	Free
30 July 2021	(Canada) Sebastian Castello	Sigma FC	Forge FC	Free
3 August 2021	(Canada) Ben Fisk	Atlético Ottawa	Cavalry FC	Free
7 August 2021	(Canada) Matthew Arnone	York United	Atlético Ottawa	Free
7 August 2021	(Canada) Nyal Higgins	Toronto FC II	Atlético Ottawa	Loan
7 August 2021	(Canada) Eleias Himaras	FC London	York United	Free
8 August 2021	(Canada) Woobens Pacius	CF Montréal	Forge FC	Free
9 August 2021	(Afghanistan) Adam Najem	Unattached	FC Edmonton	Free
10 August 2021	(Canada) Robert Boskovic	Toronto FC II	Pacific FC	Free
10 August 2021	(Canada) Jaeden Mercure	Ottawa South United	Atlético Ottawa	Free
11 August 2021	(United States) Azriel Gonzalez	(United States) Tacoma Defiance	FC Edmonton	Loan
11 August 2021	(Canada) Dale Reas-Do	Calgary Foothills	Cavalry FC	Free
19 August 2021	(Canada) Jacob Tsai	Bonivital SC	Valour FC	Free
24 August 2021	(Canada) Matteo Campagna	Vancouver Whitecaps FC	York United	Loan
28 August 2021	(Canada) Myles Cornwall	Ottawa South United	Atlético Ottawa	Free
30 August 2021	(Brazil) William Wallace	York United	(Brazil) Floresta	Loan
31 August 2021	(Canada) Nicolas Apostol	Vancouver Whitecaps FC	Cavalry FC	Free
1 September 2021	(Guinea) Mamadi Camara	Celtix du Haut-Richelieu	HFX Wanderers	Free
7 September 2021	(Nigeria) Muslim Umar	BTB Academy	FC Edmonton	Free
7 September 2021	(Canada) Nekhi Wright	BTB Academy	FC Edmonton	Free
8 September 2021	(Canada) Caden Tomy	WSA Winnipeg	Valour FC	Free
9 September 2021	(Canada) Isaac Boehmer	Vancouver Whitecaps FC	Pacific FC	Loan
9 September 2021	(Cuba) Alejandro Portal	Vaughan Azzurri	HFX Wanderers	Free
11 September 2021	(Canada) Christopher Kalongo	Sigma FC	Forge FC	Free
14 September 2021	(Guyana) Emery Welshman	(Israel) Hapoel Ra'anana	Forge FC	Free
22 September 2021	(Canada) Andrew Romano	Vaughan Azzurri	York United	Free
22 September 2021	(Nigeria) Muslim Umar	FC Edmonton	York United	Free
23 September 2021	(Canada) Gabriel Boakye	(Germany) Lokomotive Leipzig	FC Edmonton	Free
7 October 2021	(Guyana) Javier George	(France) Stade Beaucairois	York United	Free
26 October 2021	(Canada) Paul Amedume	Vancouver Whitecaps FC	Pacific FC	Free
