= 2021 Atlético Ottawa season =

Atlético Ottawa
2021 season
- CEO: Fernando Lopez
- Head coach: Mista
- Stadium: TD Place Stadium; Ottawa, Ontario; IG Field; Winnipeg, Manitoba (June 26-July 24)
- Canadian Premier League: 8th
- Canadian Championship: Preliminary Round
- Top goalscorer: Malcolm Shaw (10)
- Highest home attendance: 12,064 (August 14 vs. HFX Wanderers FC)
- Lowest home attendance: 1,839 (September 8 vs. Forge FC)
- Biggest win: 2–0 vs. Cavalry FC (July 11)
- Biggest defeat: 4–0 vs. Forge FC (August 25)
Home colours	Away colours

The 2021 Atlético Ottawa season was the second season in the history of Atlético Ottawa. In addition to the Canadian Premier League, the club competed in the Canadian Championship.

== Season review ==
=== Pre-season ===
On 29 March 2021 the club announced their pre-season training camp plans in Spain. The training camp began on 1 April 2021 and took place at Los Angeles de San Rafael in Segovia before continuing at Centro Deportivo Wanda Alcalá de Henares in Alcalá de Henares. On June 3, after nine weeks in Spain, the club returned to Canada to begin quarantine before returning to training.

=== Regular season ===
==== The Kickoff ====
On 7 June 2021 the Canadian Premier League announced that the beginning of the 2021 regular season would occur in a bubble environment in Winnipeg, Manitoba. "The Kickoff", as it was branded, would occur between 26 June and 24 July and all matches would take place at IG Field. The club began training in Winnipeg on 17 June before playing in the season's inaugural match on 26 June, a 1–0 victory over FC Edmonton.

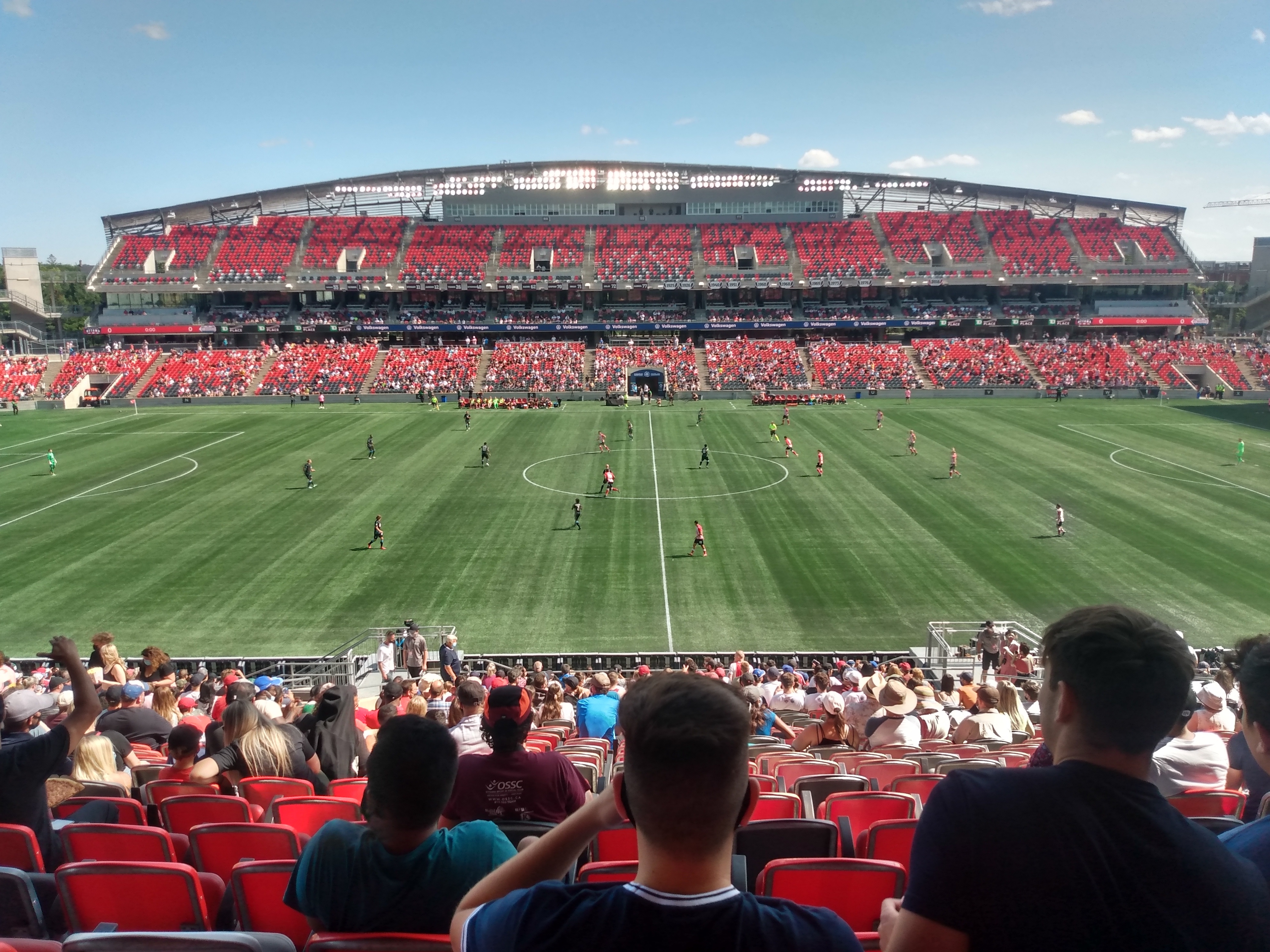
Moments after kick-off at Atlético Ottawa's first home game on August 14, 2021

== Current squad ==
As of June 22, 2021

No.	Name	Nationality	Position(s)	Date of birth (age)	Previous club
Goalkeepers
1	Dylon Powley	(Canada)	GK	September 5, 1996 (aged 25)	(Canada) FC Edmonton
13	Teodor Obadal	(Serbia)	GK	September 8, 2001 (aged 20)	(Serbia) FK Lokomotiva Belgrad
Defenders
2	Drew Beckie	(Canada)	CB	September 30, 1990 (aged 31)	(United States) El Paso Locomotive
3	Milovan Kapor	(Canada)	CB / DM	August 5, 1991 (aged 30)	(Uzbekistan) FK Buxoro
4	Brandon John	(Canada)	CB	January 5, 1995 (aged 26)	(United States) Orlando City B
17	Miguel Acosta	(Spain)	RB	March 16, 1998 (aged 23)	(Spain) Atlético Baleares
20	Nyal Higgins	(Canada)	CB	January 19, 1998 (aged 23)	(Canada) Toronto FC II
21	Myles Cornwall	(Canada)	LB	September 12, 1998 (aged 23)	(Canada) Ottawa South United
23	Matthew Arnone	(Canada)	CB	February 28, 1994 (aged 27)	(Canada) York United
33	Keesean Ferdinand	(Canada)	CB / FB	August 17, 2003 (aged 18)	(Canada) CF Montréal
44	Vashon Neufville	(England)	LB	July 18, 1999 (aged 22)	(Wales) Newport County
Midfielders
5	Viti Martínez	(Spain)	CM	May 25, 1997 (aged 24)	(Spain) Gimnàstic
6	Chris Mannella	(Canada)	DM / CM	June 7, 1994 (aged 27)	(Canada) York United
7	Ryan Telfer	(Trinidad and Tobago)	LW	March 4, 1994 (aged 27)	(Canada) York United
8	Ben McKendry	(Canada)	CM / AM	March 25, 1993 (aged 28)	(Sweden) Nyköpings BIS
10	Alberto Soto	(Spain)	AM	March 17, 2001 (aged 20)	(Spain) Atlético Madrid B
11	Antoine Coupland	(Canada)	MF	December 12, 2003 (aged 18)	(Canada) Ottawa Fury FC
16	Zach Verhoven	(Canada)	RW / LW	August 17, 1998 (aged 23)	(Canada) Pacific FC
18	Tevin Shaw	(Jamaica)	DM	February 24, 1997 (aged 24)	(Jamaica) Portmore United
22	Rafael Núñez	(Dominican Republic)	MF / RW	January 25, 2002 (aged 19)	(Spain) Club Atlético de Madrid Juvenil
28	Mamadou Ba	(Canada)	MF	December 23, 2003 (aged 18)	(Canada) Futuro Academy
91	Jaeden Mercure	(Canada)	AM	March 14, 2003 (aged 18)	(Canada) Ottawa South United
Forwards
9	Shawn-Claud Lawson	(Jamaica)	CF	January 13, 1994 (aged 27)	(United States) Detroit City FC
14	Brian Wright	(Canada)	CF	March 24, 1995 (aged 26)	(United States) Birmingham Legion FC
19	Malcolm Shaw	(Canada)	CF	July 27, 1995 (aged 26)	(Sweden) Assyriska IK
99	Raúl Uche	(Spain)	CF	October 8, 1997 (aged 24)	(Spain) Real Valladolid Promesas

== Transfers ==
=== In ===
==== Transferred in ====
No.	Pos.	Player	From club	Fee/notes	Date	Source
6	MF	(Canada) Chris Mannella	(Canada) York United	Free transfer	April 6, 2021	
1	GK	(Canada) Dylon Powley	(Canada) FC Edmonton	Free transfer	April 8, 2021	
	FW	(Canada) Jordan Webb	(Singapore) Tampines Rovers	Free transfer	April 13, 2021	
16	MF	(Canada) Zach Verhoven	(Canada) Pacific FC	Free transfer	April 15, 2021	
7	MF	(Trinidad and Tobago) Ryan Telfer	(Canada) York United	Free transfer	April 20, 2021	
13	GK	(Serbia) Teodor Obadal	(Serbia) FK Lokomotiva Belgrad	Free transfer	April 22, 2021	
14	FW	(Canada) Brian Wright	(United States) Birmingham Legion FC	Free transfer	April 27, 2021	
9	FW	(Jamaica) Shawn-Claud Lawson	(United States) Detroit City FC	Free transfer	April 29, 2021	
2	DF	(Canada) Drew Beckie	(United States) El Paso Locomotive	Free transfer	May 4, 2021	
17	DF	(Spain) Miguel Acosta	(Spain) Atlético Baleares	Free transfer	May 20, 2021	
99	FW	(Spain) Raúl Uche	(Spain) Real Valladolid Promesas	Free transfer	July 28, 2021	
23	DF	(Canada) Matthew Arnone	(Canada) York United FC	Free transfer	August 7, 2021	
91	MF	(Canada) Jaeden Mercure	(Canada) Ottawa South United	Canadian Development contract	August 10, 2021	
21	DF	(Canada) Myles Cornwall	(Canada) Ottawa South United	Free transfer	August 28, 2021	
28	MF	(Canada) Mamadou Ba	(Canada) Futuro Academy	Canadian Development Contract	September 2, 2021	

==== Loans in ====
No.	Pos.	Player	Loaned from	Fee/notes	Date	Source
33	DF	(Canada) Keesean Ferdinand	(Canada) CF Montréal	Season-long loan	February 3, 2021	
22	MF	(Dominican Republic) Rafael Núñez	(Spain) Club Atlético de Madrid Juvenil	Season-long loan	June 10, 2021	
10	MF	(Spain) Alberto Soto	(Spain) Atlético Madrid B	Season-long loan	June 22, 2021	
20	DF	(Canada) Nyal Higgins	(Canada) Toronto FC II	Season-long loan	August 7, 2021	

==== Draft picks ====
Atlético Ottawa selected the following players in the 2021 CPL–U Sports Draft on January 29, 2021. Draft picks are not automatically signed to the team roster. Only those who are signed to a contract will be listed as transfers in.

Round	Selection	Pos.	Player	Nationality	University
1	2	DF	Cristopher Malekos	Canada	Carleton Ravens
2	15	DF	Reggie Laryea	Canada	York Lions

=== Out ===
==== Transferred out ====
No.	Pos.	Player	To club	Fee/notes	Date	Source
28	FW	(Canada) Maksym Kowal	(Germany) Germania Halberstadt	Contract expired	October 28, 2020	
25	GK	(Canada) Ricky Gomes	(Canada) Simcoe County Rovers FC	Contract expired	November 27, 2020	
8	MF	(Mexico) Francisco Acuña	(Mexico) Club Necaxa	Contract expired	January 5, 2021	
23	MF	(Canada) Ajay Khabra	Retired		February 20, 2021	
2	DF	(Canada) Malyk Hamilton	(United States) North Carolina FC	Contract expired	February 22, 2021	
1	GK	(Spain) Nacho Zabal	(Andorra) UE Sant Julià	Contract expired	February 26, 2021	
9	MF	(Guinea) Mohamed Kourouma		Contract expired	February 26, 2021	
10	MF	(Canada) Ben Fisk	(Canada) Cavalry FC	Contract expired	February 26, 2021	
12	DF	(Canada) Michel Djaozandry		Contract expired	February 26, 2021	
14	DF	(Canada) Jarred Phillips		Contract expired	February 26, 2021	
30	GK	(Cameroon) Horace Sobze Zemo		Contract expired	February 26, 2021	
42	MF	(Canada) Matteo de Brienne		Contract expired	February 26, 2021	
13	DF	(Canada) Kunle Dada-Luke	(Canada) Pacific FC	Contract expired	March 11, 2021	
	MF	(Ghana) Bernardinho		Contract terminated	June 23, 2021	
	MF	(Canada) Jordan Webb		Contract terminated	July 27, 2021	

==== Loans out ====
No.	Pos.	Player	Loaned to	Fee/notes	Date	Source
5	MF	(Spain) Viti Martínez	(Spain) Deportivo Alavés B	Loaned until March 2021	October 7, 2020	

== Pre-season friendlies ==
14 April 2021 Friendly	Gimnástica Segoviana CF (Spain)	0–1	(Canada) Atlético Ottawa	Segovia, Spain
		Report		Stadium: La Albuera

21 April 2021 Friendly	RSD Alcalá (Spain)	1–2	(Canada) Atlético Ottawa	Alcalá de Henares, Spain
		Report		Stadium: Centro Deportivo Wanda Alcalá de Henares

5 May 2021 Friendly	CD Leganés B (Spain)	v	(Canada) Atlético Ottawa	Alcalá de Henares, Spain
				Stadium: Centro Deportivo Wanda Alcalá de Henares

8 May 2021 Friendly	Club Atlético de Madrid Juvenil A (Spain)	2–0	(Canada) Atlético Ottawa	Majadahonda, Spain
		Report

== Competitions ==
=== Canadian Premier League ===
==== Table ====
Pos	Team	Pld	W	D	L	GF	GA	GD	Pts	Qualification
1	Forge (S)	28	16	2	10	39	24	+15	50	Advance to playoffs
2	Cavalry	28	14	8	6	34	30	+4	50	Advance to playoffs
3	Pacific (C)	28	13	6	9	47	34	+13	45	Advance to playoffs
4	York United	28	8	12	8	35	39	−4	36	Advance to playoffs
5	Valour	28	10	5	13	38	36	+2	35	
6	HFX Wanderers	28	8	11	9	28	34	−6	35	
7	FC Edmonton	28	6	10	12	34	41	−7	28	
8	Atlético Ottawa	28	6	8	14	30	47	−17	26	

Updated to match(es) played on unknown. Source: CanPL.ca
Rules for classification: 1) points; 2) total wins.
(C) Champions; (S) Regular season winner

==== Post-Bubble Results Summary ====
Overall								Home						Away					
Pld	W	D	L	GF	GA	GD	Pts	W	D	L	GF	GA	GD	W	D	L	GF	GA	GD
20	4	7	9	23	34	−11	19	3	4	3	14	14	0	1	3	6	9	20	−11

Last updated: 7 November 2021.
Source: Matches

==== Results by Match ====
Match	1	2	3	4	5	6	7	8	9	10	11	12	13	14	15	16	17	18	19	20	21	22	23	24	25	26	27	28
Result	W	L	L	L	W	L	D	L	L	L	W	D	L	D	D	L	L	L	D	W	L	L	D	W	L	W	D	D
Position	4	4	6	8	5	6	5	8	8	8	8	8	8	8	8	8	8	8	8	8	8	8	8	8	8	7	7	7

Source: #Matches
W = Win; D = Draw; L = Loss

==== Matches ====
June 26 1	FC Edmonton	0–1	Atlético Ottawa	Winnipeg, Manitoba
2:00pm ET	Soria (yellow card) 28'; Đidić (yellow card) 67'; Esua (yellow card) 71'	Report	Lawson (yellow card) 78'; Viti 82'	Stadium: IG Field; Attendance: 0 Referee: Alain Ruch

June 30 2	Atlético Ottawa	1–4	Cavalry FC	Winnipeg, Manitoba
10:00pm ET	Acosta 24'; McKendry (yellow card) 68'; Beckie (yellow card) 75'	Report	Selemani 9', 43'; Loturi 75'; Simmons 78'	Stadium: IG Field; Attendance: 0 Referee: Fabrizio Stasolla

July 3 3	Valour FC	2–0	Atlético Ottawa	Winnipeg, Manitoba
10:00pm ET	Ohin 45'; Ricci (yellow card) 70'; Dyer 90+2' (pen.)	Report	Acosta (yellow card) 40'; Neufville (yellow card) 82'; Beckie (yellow card) 90+2'	Stadium: IG Field; Attendance: 0 Referee: Ben Hoskins

July 7 4	Atlético Ottawa	0–1	Pacific FC	Winnipeg, Manitoba
7:00pm ET		Report	Hojabrpour (yellow card) 36'; Young (yellow card) 54'; Heard 63'	Stadium: IG Field; Attendance: 0 Referee: Filip Dujic

July 11 5	Cavalry FC	0–2	Atlético Ottawa	Winnipeg, Manitoba
9:00pm ET	Farsi (yellow card) 26'; Novak (yellow card) 90+3'	Report	Acosta (yellow card) 31'; Beckie (yellow card) 54'; Shaw 75'; Coupland 90+7'	Stadium: IG Field; Attendance: 0 Referee: Yusri Rudolf

July 15 6	Atlético Ottawa	0–1	Valour FC	Winnipeg, Manitoba
5:00pm ET	Núñez (yellow card) 45+2'; Beckie (yellow card) 58'	Report	Ricci (yellow card) 16'; Dyer 85'; Baquero (yellow card) 90+3'; Ulloa (yellow card) 90+5'	Stadium: IG Field; Attendance: 0 Referee: Fabrizio Stasolla

July 18 7	Atlético Ottawa	1–1	FC Edmonton	Winnipeg, Manitoba
10:30pm ET	Verhoven 4', (yellow card) 28'; Mannella (yellow card) 70'	Report	Mabussi (yellow card) 27'; Gee (yellow card) 70'; Porter 86'	Stadium: IG Field; Attendance: 0 Referee: Carly Shaw-MacLaren

July 21 8	Pacific FC	4–2	Atlético Ottawa	Winnipeg, Manitoba
10:00pm ET	Díaz 35' (pen.), 52', 55'; Polisi (yellow card) 40'; Bustos (yellow card) 59'; Haynes (yellow card) 59'; Hojabrpour (yellow card) 71'; Campbell 74'; Young (yellow card) 77'	Report	Shaw 2', 15'; McKendry (red card) 22'; Kapor (yellow card) 34'; Shaw (yellow card) 38'	Stadium: IG Field; Attendance: 0 Referee: Ben Hoskins

August 2 9	HFX Wanderers	2–1	Atlético Ottawa	Halifax, Nova Scotia
2:00pm ET	Morellia 25', 37'; Garcia (yellow card) 29'	Report	Telfer 21'; Mannella (yellow card) 39'; Shaw (yellow card) 79'; Acosta (yellow card) 90'	Stadium: Wanderers Grounds; Referee: Pierre-Luc Lauzière

August 8 10	Forge FC	2–0	Atlético Ottawa	Hamilton, Ontario
1:00pm ET	Babouli 39' (pen.); Metusala 43'; Samuel (yellow card) 56'; Tissot (yellow card) 87'	Report	Martínez (yellow card) 45' (yellow-red card) 45+4'; Telfer (yellow card) 74'; Soto (yellow card) 83'	Stadium: Tim Hortons Field

August 14 11	Atlético Ottawa	2–1	HFX Wanderers	Ottawa, Ontario
3:00pm ET	Shaw 39'; Beckie (yellow card) 82'; Wright 87'; Shaw (yellow card) 88'	Report	Garcia 12' (pen.); Karajovanovic (yellow card) 16'; Rampersad (yellow card) 57'	Stadium: TD Place Stadium; Attendance: 12,064; Referee: David Barrie

August 18 12	Atlético Ottawa	1–1	York United	Ottawa, Ontario
7:00pm ET	McKendry (yellow card) 56'; Telfer (yellow card) 73'; Soto 89' (yellow card) 90'	Report	Toussaint (yellow card) 58'; Rivero 65' (pen.)	Stadium: TD Place Stadium; Attendance: 2,788; Referee: Fabrizio Stasolla

August 25 13	Forge FC	4–0	Atlético Ottawa	Hamilton, Ontario
8:00pm	Krutzen 44' (pen.); Pacius 54', 61'; Tissot (yellow card) 87'; Nanco 90+1'	Report	Kapor (yellow card) 36'; Shaw (yellow card) 81'; Martínez (yellow card) 86'	Stadium: Tim Hortons Field; Referee: Yusri Rudolf

August 29 14	Atlético Ottawa	2–2	HFX Wanderers	Ottawa, Ontario
1:30pm ET	McKendry (yellow card) 35'; Wright 39'; Telfer (yellow card) 45+2', (red card) 45+2'; Verhoven (yellow card) 69'; Shaw 75' (pen.)	Report	Morelli 3', (yellow card) 45+3', (goal) 51'; Karajovanovic (yellow card) 58'; Geffrard (yellow card) 74'	Stadium: TD Place Stadium; Attendance: 2,456; Referee: Scott Bowman

September 1 15	Atlético Ottawa	2–2	York United FC	Ottawa, Ontario
7:00pm EST	T. Shaw (yellow card) 46'; Acosta 50'; Mannella (yellow card) 74'; M. Shaw 82'; McKendry (yellow card) 64'	Report	Petrasso 18'; Rivero 60'; Ulbricht (yellow card) 64'	Stadium: TD Place Stadium; Attendance: 2,437; Referee: David Barrie

September 8 16	Atlético Ottawa	0–1	Forge FC	Ottawa, Ontario
7:00pm ET	Kapor (yellow card) 47'; Shaw (yellow card) 52'; Núñez (yellow card) 90+4'	Report	Samuel (yellow card) 55'; Pacius 65'	Stadium: TD Place Stadium; Attendance: 1,839; Referee: Filip Dujic

September 11 17	Atlético Ottawa	1–2	HFX Wanderers	Ottawa, Ontario
1:30pm ET	T. Shaw (yellow card) 38'; Higgins (yellow card) 42'; Verhoven (yellow card) 45'; M. Shaw 52'	Report	Morelli 17' (pen.) (yellow card) 69' (goal) 89'; Schaale (yellow card) 67'	Stadium: TD Place Stadium; Attendance: 3,468; Referee: Fabrizio Stasolla

September 14 18	York United	2–0	Atlético Ottawa	Toronto, Ontario
7:00pm ET	N'sa (yellow card) 46'; Abzi 53'; Wilson (yellow card) 58'; Gutiérrez 68'	Report	Acosta (yellow card) 40'; Higgins (yellow card) 69' (yellow-red card) 90+5'	Stadium: York Lions Stadium; Attendance: 1,021; Referee: Fabrizio Stasolla

September 19 19	Pacific FC	1–1	Atlético Ottawa	Langford, British Columbia
5:00pm ET	Heard (yellow card) 71'; Bassett (yellow card) 80'; Campbell 86'	Report	Wright 19'; Verhoven (yellow card) 51'; Acosta (yellow card) 58'; Mannella (yellow card) 67'; McKendry (yellow card) 90+1'	Stadium: Starlight Stadium; Attendance: 2,721; Referee: Voja Sremcevic

September 25 20	Atlético Ottawa	3–1	Cavalry FC	Ottawa, Ontario
4:30pm ET	Beckie 2', (yellow card) 59'; Shaw 39' (pen.); McKendry (yellow card) 59'; Wright 72'	Report	Loturi 18'; Carducci (yellow card) 38'; Norman (yellow card) 62'; Hernández (yellow card) 85'	Stadium: TD Place Stadium; Attendance: 3,648; Referee: Pierre Luce Lauziere

September 29 21	HFX Wanderers	2–1	Atlético Ottawa	Halifax, Nova Scotia
5:30pm ET	Camara (yellow card) 33'; Morelli 45+3' (pen.) 54'; Baskett (yellow card) 78'; Karajovanovic (yellow card) 86'	Report	Neufville (yellow card) 45+2'; Telfer 68'	Stadium: Wanderers Grounds

October 3 22	Atlético Ottawa	0–3	Forge FC	Ottawa, Ontario
3:30pm ET		Report	Choinière 7'; Krutzen 52'; Pacius 80'; Babouli (yellow card) 82'	Stadium: TD Place Stadium; Attendance: 2,297

October 8 23	York United	1–1	Atlético Ottawa	Toronto, Ontario
7:30pm ET	Toussaint (yellow card) 25'; Gutiérrez (yellow card) 62'; Wright (yellow card) 86'; Wilson 90+2'; Abzi (yellow card) 90+2'	Report	McKendry (yellow card) 24'; Shaw 49' (pen.); Verhoven (yellow card) 51'; Neufville (yellow card) 90+2'; Núñez (yellow card) 90+6'; Soto (yellow card) 90+7'; Powley (yellow card) 90+9'	Stadium: York Lions Stadium; Attendance: 970; Referee: Renzo Villanueva

October 12 24	FC Edmonton	3–4	Atlético Ottawa	Edmonton, Alberta
9:00pm ET	Gonzalez 17'; Gorskie (yellow card) 45'; Najem 63'; Aird 76' (pen.)	Report	Wright 5' (pen.), 39'; McKendry 49'; Soto 57'; Beckie (yellow card) 86'	Stadium: Clarke Stadium; Attendance: 580; Referee: Juan Marquez

October 16 25	Forge FC	2–0	Atlético Ottawa	Hamilton, Ontario
3:30pm ET	Awuah (yellow card) 19'; Borges (yellow card) 45+3'; Samuel (yellow card) 61'; Browne 62'; Cissé 74'	Report	Neufville (yellow card) 17'; Acosta (yellow card) 40'; Beckie (yellow card) 56'	Stadium: Tim Hortons Field; Referee: Yusri Rudolf

October 20 26	Atlético Ottawa	2–0	Valour FC	Ottawa, Ontario
7:00pm ET	Shaw 57'; Telfer 64'	Report		Stadium: TD Place Stadium; Attendance: 2,271; Referee: Fabrizio Stasolla

October 24 27	Atlético Ottawa	1–1	York United	Ottawa, Ontario
2:00pm ET	Coupland 15'; Kapor (yellow card) 64'; Telfer (yellow card) 82'	Report	Petrasso (yellow card) 9'; Toussaint (yellow card) 71'; C. N'sa 80'	Stadium: TD Place Stadium; Referee: Filip Dujic

November 7 28	HFX Wanderers	1–1	Atlético Ottawa	Halifax, Nova Scotia
1:00pm ET	Salter 11'; Schaale (yellow card) 16'; Portal (yellow card) 41'; Santos (yellow card) 56'; Rampersad (yellow card) 67'; Geffrard (yellow card) 88'	Report	Acosta (yellow card) 25'; Arnone 57', (yellow card) 53' (yellow-red card) 57'	Stadium: Wanderers Grounds; Attendance: 6,456; Referee: Fabrizio Stasolla

=== Canadian Championship ===
August 21 Preliminary Round	Atlético Ottawa	2–3	Valour FC	Ottawa, Ontario
7:00pm ET	Wright 16'; Viti 90+2'	Report	Rea 30'; Mikhael (yellow card) 37'; Ricci 60', 63'	Stadium: TD Place Stadium; Attendance: 2,881; Referee: Pierre-Luc Lauzière

== Statistics ==
=== Squad and statistics ===
As of November 7, 2021

No.	Pos	Nat	Player	Total		Canadian Premier League		Canadian Championship	
No.	Pos	Nat	Player	Apps	Goals	Apps	Goals	Apps	Goals
Goalkeepers
1	GK	(Canada) CAN	Dylon Powley	26	0	26	0	0	0
13	GK	(Serbia) SRB	Teodor Obadal	3	0	2	0	1	0
Defenders
2	DF	(Canada) CAN	Drew Beckie	19	1	18	1	1	0
3	DF	(Canada) CAN	Milovan Kapor	22	0	21	0	1	0
4	DF	(Canada) CAN	Brandon John	5	0	5	0	0	0
17	DF	(Spain) ESP	Miguel Acosta	28	2	27	2	1	0
20	DF	(Canada) CAN	Nyal Higgins	8	0	8	0	0	0
21	DF	(Canada) CAN	Myles Cornwall	2	0	2	0	0	0
23	DF	(Canada) CAN	Matthew Arnone	15	1	14	1	1	0
33	DF	(Canada) CAN	Keesean Ferdinand	18	0	17	0	1	0
44	DF	(England) ENG	Vashon Neufville	13	0	13	0	0	0
Midfielders
5	MF	(Spain) ESP	Viti Martínez	14	2	13	1	1	1
6	MF	(Canada) CAN	Chris Mannella	19	0	19	0	0	0
7	MF	(Trinidad and Tobago) TTO	Ryan Telfer	17	3	16	3	1	0
8	MF	(Canada) CAN	Ben McKendry	25	1	25	1	0	0
10	MF	(Spain) ESP	Alberto Soto	20	2	19	2	1	0
11	MF	(Canada) CAN	Antoine Coupland	16	2	15	2	1	0
16	MF	(Canada) CAN	Zach Verhoven	26	1	25	1	1	0
18	MF	(Jamaica) JAM	Tevin Shaw	19	0	18	0	1	0
22	MF	(Dominican Republic) DOM	Rafael Núñez	26	0	25	0	1	0
91	MF	(Canada) CAN	Jaeden Mercure	5	0	5	0	0	0
Forwards
9	FW	(Jamaica) JAM	Shawn-Claud Lawson	8	0	8	0	0	0
14	FW	(Canada) CAN	Brian Wright	24	7	23	6	1	1
19	FW	(Canada) CAN	Malcolm Shaw	28	10	28	10	0	0
99	FW	(Spain) ESP	Raúl Uche	12	0	11	0	1	0

=== Top scorers ===
Rank	Nat.	Player	Pos.	Canadian Premier League	Canadian Championship	TOTAL
1	(Canada)	Malcolm Shaw	FW	10	0	10
2	(Canada)	Brian Wright	FW	6	1	7
3	(Trinidad and Tobago)	Ryan Telfer	MF	3	0	3
4	(Spain)	Miguel Acosta	DF	2	0	2
4	(Canada)	Antoine Coupland	MF	2	0	2
4	(Spain)	Viti Martínez	MF	1	1	2
4	(Spain)	Alberto Soto	MF	2	0	2
8	(Canada)	Matthew Arnone	DF	1	0	1
8	(Canada)	Drew Beckie	DF	1	0	1
8	(Canada)	Ben McKendry	MF	1	0	1
8	(Canada)	Zach Verhoven	MF	1	0	1
Totals				30	2	32

Updated to match played November 7, 2021
Source: Canadian Premier League

=== Top assists ===
Rank	Nat.	Player	Pos.	Canadian Premier League	Canadian Championship	TOTAL
1	(Canada)	Zach Verhoven	MF	6	0	6
2	(Canada)	Chris Mannella	MF	2	0	2
2	(Spain)	Viti Martínez	MF	2	0	2
2	(Spain)	Alberto Soto	MF	2	0	2
5	(Spain)	Miguel Acosta	DF	1	0	1
5	(Canada)	Drew Beckie	DF	1	0	1
5	(Canada)	Ben McKendry	MF	1	0	1
5	(England)	Vashon Neufville	DF	1	0	1
5	(Canada)	Malcolm Shaw	FW	1	0	1
5	(Jamaica)	Tevin Shaw	MF	1	0	1
5	(Canada)	Brian Wright	FW	1	0	1
Totals				17	0	17

Updated to match played October 24, 2021
Source: Canadian Premier League

=== Clean sheets ===
Rank	Nat.	Player	Canadian Premier League	Canadian Championship	TOTAL
1	(Canada)	Dylon Powley	3	0	3
Totals			3	0	3

Updated to match played October 20, 2021
Source: Canadian Premier League

=== Disciplinary record ===
No.	Pos.	Nat.	Player	Canadian Premier League		Canadian Championship		TOTAL	
No.	Pos.	Nat.	Player	Booked	Sent off (straight red)	Booked	Sent off (straight red)	Booked	Sent off (straight red)
1	GK	(Canada)	Dylon Powley	1	0	0	0	1	0
2	DF	(Canada)	Drew Beckie	6	0	0	0	6	0
3	DF	(Canada)	Milovan Kapor	4	0	0	0	4	0
5	MF	(Spain)	Viti Martínez	2	1	0	0	2	1
6	MF	(Canada)	Chris Mannella	4	0	0	0	4	0
7	MF	(Trinidad and Tobago)	Ryan Telfer	4	1	0	0	4	1
8	MF	(Canada)	Ben McKendry	7	1	0	0	7	1
9	FW	(Jamaica)	Shawn-Claud Lawson	1	0	0	0	1	0
10	MF	(Spain)	Alberto Soto	3	0	0	0	3	0
16	MF	(Canada)	Zach Verhoven	5	0	0	0	5	0
17	DF	(Spain)	Miguel Acosta	7	0	0	0	7	0
18	MF	(Jamaica)	Tevin Shaw	7	0	0	0	7	0
20	DF	(Canada)	Nyal Higgins	2	1	0	0	2	1
22	MF	(Dominican Republic)	Rafael Núñez	3	0	0	0	3	0
23	DF	(Canada)	Matthew Arnone	1	1	0	0	3	0
44	DF	(England)	Vashon Neufville	4	0	0	0	4	0
Totals				58	5	0	0	58	5

Updated to match played November 7, 2021
Source: Canadian Premier League
