= 2021 Canadian Premier League season =

Professional soccer league season

Canadian Premier League
- Season: 2021
- Dates: June 26 – November 16 (regular season)
- Champions: Pacific FC (1st title)
- CPL Shield: Forge FC (1st shield)
- CONCACAF Champions League: Forge FC (Note: Forge FC qualified for the Champions League as 2021 CONCACAF League semi-finalists.)
- CONCACAF League: Pacific FC
- Matches: 112
- Goals: 282 (2.52 per match)
- Top goalscorer: João Morelli (14 goals)
- Best goalkeeper: Jonathan Sirois (9 clean sheets)
- Biggest home win: Forge FC 4–0 Atlético Ottawa (August 25); Pacific FC 5–1 FC Edmonton (October 26)
- Biggest away win: Valour FC 0–3 FC Edmonton (September 7); Atlético Ottawa 0–3 Forge FC (October 3)
- Highest scoring: 7 goals FC Edmonton 3–4 Atlético Ottawa (October 12)
- Longest winning run: 3 matches Valour FC (June 27 – July 3, July 11–18); Pacific FC (July 21 – August 4, August 29 – September 9); Forge FC (September 25 – October 6, October 30 – November 9)
- Longest unbeaten run: 10 matches HFX Wanderers (August 22 – October 3)
- Longest winless run: 8 matches Atlético Ottawa (August 18 – September 19); Valour FC (August 29 – October 5)
- Longest losing run: 4 matches Valour FC (July 24 – August 12)
- Highest attendance: 12,064; Atlético Ottawa 2–1 HFX Wanderers (August 14)

The 2021 Canadian Premier League season was the third season of the Canadian Premier League, the top men's professional level of the Canadian Soccer Association's league system. Forge FC were defending champions, after defeating HFX Wanderers FC in the 2020 final.

The season was planned to commence on May 22, the Victoria Day weekend, pending the approval of government authorities and the state of the COVID-19 pandemic in Canada. However, on May 14, it was announced that the start was to be pushed back to mid-June or early July.

On June 5, the league committed to a full 28-match season, but that the season would begin in a single-site bubble at IG Field in Winnipeg, Manitoba, promoted as "The Kickoff", with each team playing eight matches between June 26 and July 24. All matches were played behind closed doors and in compliance with Manitoba public health orders. On July 30, the CPL began to play matches at home venues.

Pacific FC defeated two-time champions and title holders Forge FC in the final to win their first title.

== Team and rule changes ==
The same eight clubs that participated in the 2020 Canadian Premier League season competed in 2021. York United FC participated under their new name for the first time, having previously been known as York9 FC.

Teams were required to play Canadian players aged 21 years or younger for a minimum of 1,500 minutes this season, increased from 1,000 minutes. The maximum team compensation for this season was $1.2 million split between players and coaching staff. The required spend on player compensation was $650,000 to $850,000.

== Teams ==
=== Stadiums and locations ===
Locations of clubs in the 2021 Canadian Premier League season.

Club	Location	Stadium	Capacity
Atlético Ottawa	Ottawa	TD Place Stadium	24,000
Cavalry	Foothills County	ATCO Field	6,000
FC Edmonton	Edmonton	Clarke Stadium	5,100
Forge	Hamilton	Tim Hortons Field	23,218
HFX Wanderers	Halifax	Wanderers Grounds	6,500
Pacific	Langford	Starlight Stadium	6,000
Valour	Winnipeg	IG Field	33,000
York United	Toronto	York Lions Stadium	4,000

=== Personnel and sponsorship ===
Team	Head coach	Captain(s)	Shirt sponsor	Kit manufacturer
Atlético Ottawa	(Spain) Mista	(Canada) Milovan Kapor	ComeOn!	Macron
Cavalry	(England) Tommy Wheeldon Jr.	(Canada) Nik Ledgerwood	WestJet	Macron
FC Edmonton	(South Africa) Alan Koch		Swoop	Macron
Forge	(Canada) Bobby Smyrniotis	(Canada) Kyle Bekker	Tim Hortons	Macron
HFX Wanderers	(Trinidad and Tobago) Stephen Hart	(Trinidad and Tobago) Andre Rampersad	Volkswagen	Macron
Pacific	(Norway) Pa-Modou Kah	(Canada) Jamar Dixon	Volkswagen	Macron
Valour	(Canada) Phillip Dos Santos	(Northern Ireland) Daryl Fordyce	OneSoccer	Macron
York United	(Canada) Jimmy Brennan	(Canada) Roger Thompson	Macron	Macron

=== Number of teams by province or territory ===
Rank	Province or territory	Number	Teams
1	Ontario	3	Atlético Ottawa; Forge; York United
2	Alberta	2	Cavalry; FC Edmonton
3	British Columbia	1	Pacific
3	Manitoba	1	Valour
3	Nova Scotia	1	HFX Wanderers

=== Coaching changes ===
Team	Outgoing coach	Manner of departure	Date of vacancy	Position in table	Incoming coach	Date of appointment
FC Edmonton	(Canada) Jeff Paulus	Resigned	September 21, 2020	Pre-season	(South Africa) Alan Koch	November 24, 2020
Valour FC	(England) Rob Gale	Sacked	September 23, 2021	5th	(Canada) Phillip Dos Santos	September 23, 2021

== Regular season ==
=== Format ===
Between June 26 and July 24, teams played their first eight games at IG Field in Winnipeg. Teams from Eastern Canada and Western Canada played two matches against each of the four teams in the opposite region to reduce travel when teams return to home stadiums. For the remainder of the season, teams played 16 games against opponents from their own region and 4 against opponents from the opposite region.

=== Table ===
Pos	Team	Pld	W	D	L	GF	GA	GD	Pts	Qualification
1	Forge (S)	28	16	2	10	39	24	+15	50	Advance to playoffs
2	Cavalry	28	14	8	6	34	30	+4	50	Advance to playoffs
3	Pacific (C)	28	13	6	9	47	34	+13	45	Advance to playoffs
4	York United	28	8	12	8	35	39	−4	36	Advance to playoffs
5	Valour	28	10	5	13	38	36	+2	35	
6	HFX Wanderers	28	8	11	9	28	34	−6	35	
7	FC Edmonton	28	6	10	12	34	41	−7	28	
8	Atlético Ottawa	28	6	8	14	30	47	−17	26	

Updated to match(es) played on unknown. Source: CanPL.ca
Rules for classification: 1) points; 2) total wins.
(C) Champions; (S) Regular season winner

=== Results ===
==== The Kickoff ====
Teams	CAV	EDM	PAC	VAL	ATO	FOR	HFX	YRK
Cavalry	—				0–2	0–2	0–0	2–1
FC Edmonton		—			0–1	2–0	1–0	1–1
Pacific			—		4–2	1–2	2–0	3–0
Valour				—	2–0	1–0	2–0	3–0
Atlético Ottawa	1–4	1–1	0–1	0–1	—			
Forge	1–2	1–0	3–0	0–2		—		
HFX Wanderers	1–2	2–1	0–0	1–0			—	
York United	0–0	1–0	2–2	2–1				—

Source: CanPL.ca
Legend: Blue = left column team win; Yellow = draw; Red = top row team win.

==== West ====
Home \ Away	CAV	EDM	PAC	VAL
Cavalry	—	2–1	0–0	1–0
Cavalry	—	2–2	2–1	2–4
FC Edmonton	0–1	—	1–2	3–1
FC Edmonton	2–3	—	1–1	0–0
Pacific	2–0	2–2	—	2–1
Pacific	1–2	5–1	—	3–2
Valour	0–1	3–0	0–2	—
Valour	1–1	0–3	1–3	—

Source: CanPL.ca
Legend: Blue = home team win; Yellow = draw; Red = away team win.

==== East ====
Home \ Away	ATO	FOR	HFX	YRK
Atlético Ottawa	—	0–1	2–1	1–1
Atlético Ottawa	—	0–3	2–2	2–2
Forge	2–0	—	1–1	0–1
Forge	4–0	—	4–1	3–1
HFX Wanderers	2–1	2–0	—	2–3
HFX Wanderers	2–1	0–1	—	3–3
York United	2–0	0–1	1–1	—
York United	1–1	1–2	0–0	—

Source: CanPL.ca
Legend: Blue = home team win; Yellow = draw; Red = away team win.

==== Combined ====
Home \ Away	CAV	EDM	PAC	VAL	ATO	FOR	HFX	YRK
Cavalry	—	1–1	1–0				0–0	2–1
FC Edmonton		—	2–1	3–3	3–4	1–0		
Pacific	3–1		—	3–2	1–1			1–2
Valour	0–0	1–1		—		3–1	3–0	
Atlético Ottawa	3–1			2–0	—		1–2	1–1
Forge	0–1		2–1		2–0	—		0–2
HFX Wanderers		1–0	1–0		1–1	0–0	—	
York United		1–1		2–1		1–3	2–2	—

Source: CanPL.ca
Legend: Blue = home team win; Yellow = draw; Red = away team win.

== Playoffs ==
The top-four teams in the regular season qualified for the league playoffs. The first-place team hosted the fourth, and the second-place team hosted the third in a single match round. The winners advanced to the CPL Final, a single match hosted by the higher-seeded team.

If a match was level at the end of normal playing time, extra time would be played (two periods of 15 minutes each) and followed, if necessary, by a penalty shoot-out to determine the winner. If a match reached extra time, each team was allowed to make an additional substitution.

Semi-finals; November 20–21
1	Forge FC	3
4	York United	1
2	Cavalry FC	1
3	Pacific FC (a.e.t.)	2

Final; December 5
1	Forge FC	0
3	Pacific FC	1

=== Matches ===
==== Semi-finals ====
November 20, 2021	Cavalry FC	1–2 (a.e.t.)	Pacific FC	Foothills County, Alberta
1:00 pm MST (UTC−07:00)	Yao 47'	Report	Campbell 33'; Carducci 105' (o.g.)	Stadium: ATCO Field; Attendance: 2,927; Referee: Pierre-Luc Lauzière

November 21, 2021	Forge FC	3–1	York United	Hamilton, Ontario
3:00 pm EST (UTC−05:00)	Pacius 9'; Navarro 66'; Verhoeven 73' (o.g.)	Report	Petrasso 38'	Stadium: Tim Hortons Field; Attendance: 5,123; Referee: Juan Marquez

==== Final ====
December 5, 2021	Forge FC	0–1	Pacific FC	Hamilton, Ontario
4:30pm EST (UTC−05:00)		Report	Hojabrpour 59'	Stadium: Tim Hortons Field; Attendance: 7,488; Referee: Yusri Rudolf

== Awards ==
=== Canadian Premier League Awards ===
On December 4, 2021, the Canadian Premier League revealed the nominees for the four individual awards that would be voted on by the media. These four awards plus the Golden Boot award are given based on performance over the whole season including Finals. The awards are Inuit soapstone sculptures designed by artists from Cape Dorset, Nunavut. The winners were announced at a ceremony on December 14.

2021 Canadian Premier League Awards
Award	Recipient	Finalists
Golden Boot (Hunter)	(Brazil) João Morelli (HFX Wanderers)	N/A
Golden Glove (Qimmiq or Canadian Inuit Dog)	(Canada) Jonathan Sirois (Valour FC)	(Canada) Marco Carducci (Cavalry FC) (Canada) Triston Henry (Forge FC)
Coach of the Year (Owl)	(Norway) Pa-Modou Kah (Pacific FC)	(Canada) Bobby Smyrniotis (Forge FC) (England) Tommy Wheeldon Jr. (Cavalry FC)
Player of the Year (Nikisuittuq)	(Brazil) João Morelli (HFX Wanderers FC)	(Canada) Kyle Bekker (Forge FC) (Canada) Terran Campbell (Pacific FC)
Best Under 21 Canadian Player of the Year (Polar Bear)	(Canada) Alessandro Hojabrpour (Pacific FC)	(Canada) Max Ferrari (York United FC) (Canada) Victor Loturi (Cavalry FC)

=== Team of the Week ===
The Gatorade Team of the Week is selected by OneSoccer staff.

Team of the Week
Dates	Goalkeeper	Defenders	Midfielders	Forwards	Ref
June 26–28	(Canada) Powley (Ottawa)	(Trinidad and Tobago) Peña (Valour) (Canada) Beckie (Ottawa) (Haiti) Jean-Baptiste (Valour) (Canada) Chung (Pacific)	(Spain) Martínez (Ottawa) (Honduras) Escalante (Cavalry)	(Northern Ireland) Bassett (Pacific) (Mexico) Díaz (Pacific) (Canada) Ricci (Valour) (Canada) Bustos (Pacific)	
June 28 – July 5	(Canada) Sirois (Valour)	(Canada) Abzi (York) (Canada) Yao (Cavalry) (Haiti) Jean-Baptiste (Valour) (Algeria) Farsi (Cavalry)	(England) Simmons (Cavalry) (Canada) Bekker (Forge) (Ghana) Ohin (Valour)	(Canada) Alemán (Valour) (United States) Selemani (Cavalry) (Cameroon) Jeannot Esua (Edmonton)	
July 5–12	(Canada) Irving (Pacific)	(Trinidad and Tobago) Peña (Valour) (Canada) MacNaughton (Pacific) (Canada) Beckie (Ottawa) (Canada) Chung (Pacific)	(Canada) Bekker (Forge) (Canada) McKendry (Ottawa) (Trinidad and Tobago) Rampersad (HFX)	(Northern Ireland) Bassett (Pacific) (Brazil) Morelli (HFX) (Canada) Bustos (Pacific)	
July 12–19	(Canada) Sirois (Valour)	(Canada) Awuah (Forge) (Canada) Restrepo (HFX) (Sweden) Achinioti-Jönsson (Forge) (Cuba) Baquero (Valour)	(Canada) Bekker (Forge) (Belgium) Sabak (Forge) (Senegal) Cissé (Forge)	(Canada) Rea (Valour) (Canada) Ricci (Valour) (Somalia) Musse (Cavalry)	
July 20–26	(Canada) Sirois (Valour)	(Canada) Restrepo (HFX) (Canada) Yao (Cavalry) (Netherlands) Klomp (Cavalry) (Canada) Doner (HFX)	(Canada) Johnston (York) (Trinidad and Tobago) Rampersad (HFX)	(Canada) Bustos (Pacific) (Mexico) Díaz (Pacific) (Trinidad and Tobago) Shaw (Ottawa) (Canada) Riggi (HFX)	
July 26 – August 2	(Canada) Irving (Pacific)	(Canada) Awuah (Forge) (Mali) Samake (Pacific) (Canada) Đidić (Edmonton) (Canada) Doner (HFX)	(Brazil) Morelli (HFX) (United States) Gorskie (Edmonton) (Senegal) Cissé (Forge)	(England) Bent (HFX) (Germany) Warschewski (Edmonton) (Canada) Bustos (Pacific)	
August 2–9	(Canada) Giantsopoulos (York)	(Canada) Ruby (HFX) (Canada) Zator (York) (Netherlands) Klomp (Cavalry) (Algeria) Farsi (Cavalry)	(Canada) Ferrari (York) (Canada) Norman Jr. (Cavalry) (Canada) Johnston (York)	(Canada) Camargo (Cavalry) (Canada) Ongaro (Edmonton) (Brazil) Morelli (HFX)	
August 9–16	(Canada) Silva (Valour)	(Canada) Yao (Cavalry) (Canada) Đidić (Edmonton) (Canada) Beckie (Ottawa)	(Canada) Chung (Pacific) (Spain) Soto (Ottawa) (Canada) McKendry (Ottawa) (Algeria) Farsi (Cavalry)	(Canada) Wright (Ottawa) (Trinidad and Tobago) Shaw (Ottawa) (Canada) Hernández (Cavalry)	
August 16–23	(Canada) Giantsopoulos (York)	(Canada) Gagnon-Laparé (HFX) (Canada) Yao (Cavalry) (Haiti) Geffrard (HFX) (Canada) Doner (HFX)	(Canada) Aparicio (Pacific) (Brazil) Galhardo (Valour) (Canada) Polisi (Pacific) (Canada) Petrasso (York)	(Canada) Ricci (Valour) (Republic of Ireland) Mason (Cavalry)	
August 23–30	(Canada) James (Edmonton)	(Canada) Awuah (Forge) (Netherlands) Krutzen (Forge) (Sweden) Achinioti-Jönsson (Forge) (Algeria) Farsi (Cavalry)	(Canada) Aparicio (Pacific) (Ghana) Ohin (Valour) (Canada) Hojabrpour (Pacific)	(Canada) Borges (Forge) (Haiti) Pacius (Forge) (Canada) Campbell (Pacific)	
August 30– September 7	(Canada) Carducci (Cavalry)	(Canada) Abzi (York) (Germany) Schaale (HFX) (Netherlands) Klomp (Cavalry) (Canada) Chung (Pacific)	(Canada) Ferrari (York) (England) Simmons (Cavalry) (Algeria) Farsi (Cavalry)	(Wales) Heard (Pacific) (Canada) Petrasso (York) (Brazil) Morelli (HFX)	
September 7–13	(Canada) Henry (Forge)	(Canada) Zator (York) (Canada) Đidić (Edmonton) (Canada) N'sa (York)	(United States) Gonzalez (Edmonton) (Canada) Aparicio (Pacific) (Senegal) Cissé (Forge) (Canada) Ferrari (York)	(Trinidad and Tobago) Shaw (Ottawa) (Germany) Warschewski (Edmonton) (Brazil) Morelli (HFX)	
September 13–20	(Canada) Silva (Valour)	(Canada) Abzi (York) (Mexico) Reyes (Valour) (Canada) MacNaughton (Pacific) (Canada) Verhoven (Ottawa)	(Canada) Lamothe (HFX) (Canada) Ledgerwood (Cavalry) (Canada) Loturi (Cavalry)	(Canada) Ongaro (Edmonton) (Spain) Soto (Ottawa) (Colombia) Gutiérrez (York)	
September 20–27	(Canada) Powley (Ottawa)	(Canada) Abzi (York) (Netherlands) Krutzen (Forge) (Sweden) Achinioti-Jönsson (Forge) (Canada) Beckie (Ottawa)	(Canada) Bekker (Forge) (Canada) Hojabrpour (Pacific) (Trinidad and Tobago) Rampersad (HFX)	(Canada) Karajovanovic (HFX) (Canada) L. Wright (York) (Canada) B. Wright (Ottawa)	
September 27 – October 4	(Canada) Henry (Forge)	(Canada) Awuah (Forge) (Netherlands) Krutzen (Forge) (Netherlands) Klomp (Cavalry) (Canada) Aird (Edmonton)	(Canada) Gagnon-Laparé (HFX) (Sweden) Achinioti-Jönsson (Forge) (New Zealand) Dyer (Valour)	(England) Bent (HFX) (Mexico) Díaz (Pacific) (Brazil) Morelli (HFX)	
October 4–12	(Canada) James (Edmonton)	(Honduras) Escalante (Cavalry) (Canada) Wilson (York) (Germany) Schaale (HFX) (Liberia) Fayia (Edmonton)	(Canada) Fisk (Cavalry) (Canada) Gagnon-Laparé (HFX) (Ghana) Ohin (Valour) (Trinidad and Tobago) Telfer (Ottawa)	(New Zealand) Dyer (Valour) (South Sudan) Akio (Valour)	
October 12–18	(Canada) Baskett (HFX)	(Canada) Yao (Cavalry) (Germany) Schaale (HFX) (Netherlands) Klomp (Cavalry)	(Panama) Browne (Forge) (Canada) Bekker (Forge) (Haiti) Toussaint (York) (Senegal) Cissé (Forge)	(Wales) Heard (Pacific) (Mexico) Díaz (Pacific) (Canada) Campbell (Pacific)	
October 19–25	(Canada) Ingham (York)	(Brazil) Santos (HFX) (Spain) Acosta (Ottawa) (Canada) Yao (Cavalry) (Netherlands) Klomp (Cavalry) (Canada) Verhoven (Ottawa)	(Canada) Fisk (Cavalry) (Canada) Verhoeven (York) (Spain) Soto (Ottawa) (Canada) Coupland (Ottawa)	(Republic of Ireland) Mason (Cavalry)	
October 25 – November 1	(Canada) Sirois (Valour)	(Canada) Awuah (Forge) (Netherlands) Krutzen (Forge) (Cuba) Baquero (Valour)	(Costa Rica) Navarro (Forge) (Canada) Bekker (Forge) (Spain) Galán (Valour) (South Sudan) Akio (Valour)	(Brazil) Galhardo (Valour) (Canada) Wright (York) (Canada) Bustos (Pacific)	
November 2–8	(Canada) Henry (Forge)	(Haiti) Metusala (Forge) (Canada) Yao (Cavalry) (Netherlands) Klomp (Cavalry)	(Canada) Abzi (York) (Afghanistan) Najem (Edmonton) (Senegal) Cissé (Forge) (Algeria) Farsi (Cavalry)	(Canada) Johnston (York) (Republic of Ireland) Mason (Cavalry) (New Zealand) Dyer (Valour)	

== Statistical leaders ==
=== Top scorers ===
Rank	Player	Club	Goals
1	(Brazil) João Morelli	HFX Wanderers	14
2	(Canada) Easton Ongaro	FC Edmonton	12
3	(Canada) Terran Campbell	Pacific FC	11
4	(Mexico) Alejandro Díaz	Pacific FC	10
4	(Trinidad and Tobago) Malcolm Shaw	Atlético Ottawa	10
6	(New Zealand) Moses Dyer	Valour FC	9
7	(South Sudan) William Akio	Valour FC	8
8	(Syria) Molham Babouli	Forge FC	7
8	(Canada) Marco Bustos	Pacific FC	7
8	(Republic of Ireland) Joe Mason	Cavalry FC	7
8	(Haiti) Woobens Pacius	Forge FC	7

=== Top assists ===
Rank	Player	Club	Assists
1	(Germany) Tobias Warschewski	FC Edmonton	7
2	(Canada) Tristan Borges	Forge FC	6
2	(Canada) Marco Bustos	Pacific FC	6
4	(Canada) Fraser Aird	FC Edmonton	5
4	(Canada) Terran Campbell	Pacific FC	5
4	(Canada) Ben Fisk	Cavalry FC	5
4	(Canada) Michael Petrasso	York United	5
4	(Canada) Zach Verhoven	Atlético Ottawa	5
9	4 players tied		4

=== Clean sheets ===
Rank	Player	Club	Clean sheets
1	(Canada) Jonathan Sirois	Valour FC	9
2	(Canada) Triston Henry	Forge FC	8
3	(Canada) Marco Carducci	Cavalry FC	7
3	(Canada) Callum Irving	Pacific FC	7
5	(Canada) Nathan Ingham	York United	5
5	(Canada) Christian Oxner	HFX Wanderers	5
7	(Canada) Kieran Baskett	HFX Wanderers	4
7	(Canada) Connor James	FC Edmonton	4
9	3 players tied		3

=== Hat-tricks ===
Player	For	Against	Result	Date	Ref
(Mexico) Alejandro Díaz	Pacific FC	Atlético Ottawa	4–2 (N)	July 21	

== Player transfers ==
=== U Sports Draft ===
The 2021 CPL–U Sports Draft was held virtually on January 29. Draftees are invited to team preseason camps, with an opportunity to earn a developmental contract and retain their U Sports men's soccer eligibility. FC Edmonton selected Thomas Gardner with the first overall pick. Two players were selected by each CPL team, with a total of 16 players being drafted including 12 Canadians.

=== Foreign players ===
Canadian Premier League teams could sign a maximum of seven international players, out of which only five could be in the starting line-up for each match. Starting this season, teams were required to carry a minimum of four international players, either signed through or approved by the league's scouting partner, 21st Club. The following players were considered foreign players for the 2021 season. This list does not include Canadian citizens who represent other countries at the international level.

Club	Player 1	Player 2	Player 3	Player 4	Player 5	Player 6	Player 7	Former Players
Atlético Ottawa	(Spain) Viti Martínez	(England) Vashon Neufville	(Jamaica) Tevin Shaw	(Spain) Miguel Acosta	(Dominican Republic) Rafael Núñez	(Spain) Alberto Soto	(Spain) Raúl Uche	
Cavalry	(Honduras) José Escalante	(Brazil) Richard Luca	(Republic of Ireland) Tom Field	(Netherlands) Daan Klomp	(Republic of Ireland) Joe Mason			
FC Edmonton	(Cameroon) Jeannot Esua	(Spain) Ramón Soria	(Democratic Republic of the Congo) Sharly Mabussi	(Germany) Tobias Warschewski	(United States) Hunter Gorskie	(United States) Roberto Avila	(United States) Azriel Gonzalez	(Peru) Raúl Tito
Forge	(Sweden) Alexander Achinioti-Jönsson	(Senegal) Elimane Cissé	(Belgium) Daniël Krutzen	(Belgium) Paolo Sabak	(Costa Rica) Joshua Navarro	(Panama) Omar Browne		
HFX Wanderers	(Trinidad and Tobago) Akeem Garcia	(Trinidad and Tobago) Andre Rampersad	(Germany) Peter Schaale	(Jamaica) Alex Marshall	(Brazil) João Morelli	(Brazil) Eriks Santos	(England) Cory Bent	
Pacific	(Mexico) Alejandro Díaz	(Northern Ireland) Ollie Bassett	(Netherlands) Gianni dos Santos					
Valour	(Spain) José Galán	(Republic of the Congo) Arnold Bouka Moutou	(Haiti) Andrew Jean-Baptiste	(Panama) Amir Soto	(New Zealand) Moses Dyer	(Brazil) Rafael Galhardo	(Mexico) Rodrigo Reyes	
York United	(Spain) Álvaro Rivero	(Jamaica) Nicholas Hamilton	(Germany) Julian Ulbricht	(Dominican Republic) Gerard Lavergne	(United States) Osvaldo Ramírez	(Colombia) Sebastián Gutiérrez		

Players in italic denote players new to their respective clubs for the 2021 season, sorted chronologically by their announcement.
