= Hassan Gabo =

Somali footballer

Personal information
- Full name: Hassan Gabo
- Date of birth: December 24, 2003 (age 22)
- Place of birth: Mogadishu, Somalia
- Height: 6 ft 0 in (1.83 m)
- Position: Defender

Youth career
- 2019–2020: VK Cobras FC
- 2020: Real Salt Lake

Senior career*
Years	Team	Apps	(Gls)
2023–2024	Greenville Triumph SC	13	(0)
2025–	Des Moines Menace		

International career
2022	Somalia U20		
- * Club domestic league appearances and goals

Hassan Gabo (born January 1, 2003) is a Somali professional footballer who plays as a defender for USL League Two club Des Moines Menace.

Gabo is a former member of both the Real Salt Lake Academy and VK Cobras FC from 2019 to 2020.

== Club career ==
On February 24, 2023, Hassan Gabo, who experienced a successful season with Cottonwood High School and Olympus High School, high schools he split time with in Utah, signed with USL League One side Greenville Triumph SC for their upcoming 2023 season at the age of 19. Gabo made his professional debut for Greenville in the 2–0 win over Lexington SC, coming on as a substitute for Tevin Shaw and playing 8 minutes. Gabo played 6 games, making 6 clearances, getting two yellow cards, and starting 1 match.

After a season plagued with injuries, Gabo resigned with Greenville for the 2024 season. Gabo made his first appearance of the 2024 USL League One season against Spokane Velocity, coming off the bench in the 3–1 win.

Gabo was released by Greenville following their 2024 season.

Ahead of the 2025 USL League Two season, Gabo signed with Des Moines Menace.

== International career ==
Gabo represented Somalia's youth team at the 2022 Arab Cup U-20.

In 2024, Gabo received his first ever senior national team call-up, joining the Somalia national football team for their 2025 Africa Cup of Nations qualification game against Eswatini.

== Personal life ==
Gabo is cousins with two Somalia internationals and former Greenville Triumph players, Abdi Mohamed and Omar Mohamed, who trained Gabo early in his career.
