= Ben McKendry =

Canadian soccer player (born 1993)

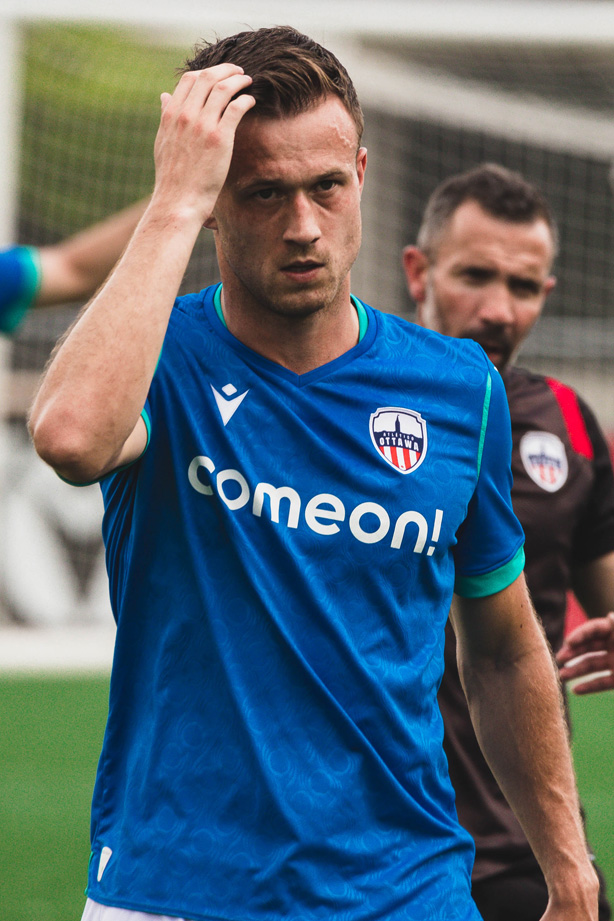
- McKendry playing for Atletico Ottawa in 2022.

Personal information
- Full name: Ben Millar McKendry
- Date of birth: March 25, 1993 (age 33)
- Place of birth: Vancouver, British Columbia, Canada
- Height: 1.80 m (5 ft 11 in)
- Position: Midfielder

Youth career
- 2006–2009: Vancouver Selects
- 2009–2012: Vancouver Whitecaps FC

College career
| Years | Team | Apps | (Gls) |
| 2012–2014 | New Mexico Lobos | 61 | (14) |

Senior career*
| Years | Team | Apps | (Gls) |
| 2011–2012 | Vancouver Whitecaps FC U-23 | 20 | (0) |
| 2015–2017 | Whitecaps FC 2 | 55 | (6) |
| 2015–2017 | Vancouver Whitecaps FC | 1 | (0) |
| 2017 | → FC Edmonton (loan) | 15 | (0) |
| 2018 | TPS | 29 | (0) |
| 2019 | Nyköpings BIS | 9 | (1) |
| 2020–2022 | Atlético Ottawa | 57 | (1) |

International career^{‡}
| 2013 | Canada U20 | 1 | (1) |
| 2016 | Canada U23 | 2 | (1) |
| 2017 | Canada | 1 | (0) |
- * Club domestic league appearances and goals as of October 17, 2022 ‡ National team caps and goals as of January 22, 2017

Ben Millar McKendry (born March 25, 1993) is a Canadian professional soccer player who plays as a midfielder.

== Club career ==
=== Early career ===
McKendry played club soccer for the Vancouver Selects and was also a member of the Vancouver Whitecaps FC Residency program before spending his college career at the University of New Mexico. He made a total of 60 appearances for the Lobos and tallied 14 goals and five assists. In 2014, the Lobos went to the College Cup ("Final 4") after McKendry scored the winner against the University of Washington in the "Elite 8".

He also played in the Premier Development League for Vancouver Whitecaps FC U-23.

=== Vancouver Whitecaps FC ===
On January 26, 2015, McKendry signed a homegrown contract with Vancouver Whitecaps FC. On March 29, he made his professional debut for USL affiliate club Whitecaps FC 2 in a 4–0 defeat to Seattle Sounders FC 2. McKendry made his Whitecaps first team debut on June 1, 2016, during the 2016 Canadian Championship. He got his first start in the MLS on March 11, 2017, in 3–2 loss to the San Jose Earthquakes. On July 26, 2017, he was loaned to FC Edmonton for the remainder of 2017. At the end of the 2017 season, the Whitecaps announced they would not pick up McKendry's contract, ending his time with the club.

=== Turun Palloseura (TPS) ===
On March 19, 2018, McKendry signed with newly promoted Finnish Premier Division (Veikkausliiga) side TPS. McKendry would make 29 appearances for TPS in the 2018 season.

=== Nyköpings BIS ===
After TPS was relegated to the Ykkönen, McKendry would sign with Nyköpings BIS of Division 1 Norra for the 2019 season.

=== Atlético Ottawa ===
On August 10, 2020, McKendry signed with Canadian Premier League side Atlético Ottawa making his debut in the club's inaugural match on August 15 against York9 and later re-signed with them for the 2021 season. He scored his first goal for Ottawa on October 13, 2021, netting the third goal in a 4–3 victory over FC Edmonton. In January 2022 Ottawa announced that McKendry had signed a one-year contract extension.

== International career ==
McKendry was born in Canada, but holds dual-citizenship with New Zealand. McKendry was a member of the Canadian under-20 squad that competed in the 2013 CONCACAF U-20 Championship. In May 2016, McKendry was called to Canada's U23 national team for a pair of friendlies against Guyana and Grenada. He scored in the match against Grenada. McKendry made his Canada Men's National Team debut in a friendly against Bermuda in January 2017.

== Honours ==
=== Atlético Ottawa ===
- Canadian Premier League
  - Regular Season: 2022

== Career statistics ==
As of September 18th, 2022

| Club | League | Season | League | | Playoffs | | Domestic cup | | Continental | | Total | |
| Club | League | Season | Apps | Goals | Apps | Goals | Apps | Goals | Apps | Goals | Apps | Goals |
|---|---|---|---|---|---|---|---|---|---|---|---|---|
| Whitecaps FC 2 | USL | 2015 | 21 | 2 | — | | — | | — | | 21 | 2 |
| Whitecaps FC 2 | USL | 2016 | 20 | 2 | 0 | 0 | — | | — | | 20 | 2 |
| Whitecaps FC 2 | USL | 2017 | 14 | 2 | — | | — | | — | | 14 | 2 |
| Whitecaps FC 2 | Total | | 55 | 6 | 0 | 0 | 0 | 0 | 0 | 0 | 55 | 6 |
| Vancouver Whitecaps FC | MLS | 2015 | 0 | 0 | — | | 0 | 0 | — | | 0 | 0 |
| Vancouver Whitecaps FC | MLS | 2016 | 0 | 0 | 0 | 0 | 2 | 0 | 2 | 0 | 4 | 0 |
| Vancouver Whitecaps FC | MLS | 2017 | 1 | 0 | — | | 2 | 0 | — | | 3 | 0 |
| Vancouver Whitecaps FC | Total | | 1 | 0 | 0 | 0 | 4 | 0 | 2 | 0 | 7 | 0 |
| FC Edmonton (loan) | NASL | 2017 | 15 | 0 | — | | 0 | 0 | — | | 15 | 0 |
| TPS | Veikkausliiga | 2018 | 29 | 0 | 2 | 0 | 0 | 0 | — | | 31 | 0 |
| Nyköping | Division 1 Norra | 2019 | 9 | 1 | 0 | 0 | 1 | 0 | — | | 10 | 1 |
| Atlético Ottawa | CPL | 2020 | 7 | 0 | — | | 0 | 0 | — | | 7 | 0 |
| Atlético Ottawa | CPL | 2021 | 25 | 0 | — | | 0 | 0 | — | | 25 | 0 |
| Atlético Ottawa | CPL | 2022 | 22 | 0 | — | | 1 | 0 | — | | 23 | 0 |
| Atlético Ottawa | Total | | 54 | 0 | 0 | 0 | 1 | 0 | 0 | 0 | 55 | 0 |
| Career total | | | 163 | 7 | 2 | 0 | 6 | 0 | 2 | 0 | 173 | 7 |
