= Myles Cornwall =

Canadian soccer player

Personal information
- Date of birth: September 12, 1998 (age 28)
- Place of birth: Ottawa, Ontario, Canada
- Height: 1.82 m (6 ft 0 in)
- Positions: Left-back; forward

Team information
- Current team: Ottawa South United

Youth career
- 2007–2011: Ottawa Royals
- 2012–2017: Ottawa South United

College career
Years	Team	Apps	(Gls)
2016–2019	Walsh Cavaliers	72	(22)

Senior career*
Years	Team	Apps	(Gls)
2017–2021	Ottawa South United	31	(6)
2021	Atlético Ottawa	2	(0)
2022	Fort Wayne FC	8	(0)
2023	Ottawa South United	15	(1)
2026–	West Ottawa SC	1	(0)
- * Club domestic league appearances and goals as of April 20, 2026

Myles Cornwall (born September 12, 1998) is a Canadian professional soccer player who plays for West Ottawa SC in LS Pro Ligue3.

== Early life ==
Cornwall was born in Ottawa and began playing youth soccer with the Ottawa Royals, followed by Ottawa South United.

He attended Sir Robert Borden High School before attending Walsh University in the United States. At Walsh, he scored 22 goals in 72 appearances over four seasons while playing as a forward.

== Club career ==
From 2017 to 2021, Cornwall played for Ottawa South United in League1 Ontario and later the Première Ligue de soccer du Québec. On May 31, 2017, he scored his first senior goals, netting two goals in a League Cup match against ProStars FC. He scored his first league goal on June 26, 2017, also against ProStars FC. On July 14, 2018, he scored a brace in a 2-2 draw with Unionville Milliken SC.

Cornwall was recommended by his OSU coach Jim Lianos to Canadian Premier League club Atlético Ottawa, who had an affiliation with OSU and were in need of a defender. After training with Atlético for three weeks, Cornwall signed his first professional contract for the remainder of the 2021 season on August 28. The following day, he made his debut as a starter in a 2–2 draw against HFX Wanderers.

In 2022, he joined USL League Two club Fort Wayne FC.

== Career statistics ==
As of match played October 8, 2023

Club	Season	League			Playoffs		Domestic Cup		League Cup (Note: Includes League1 Ontario Cup)		Total	
Club	Season	Division	Apps	Goals	Apps	Goals	Apps	Goals	Apps	Goals	Apps	Goals
Ottawa South United	2017	League1 Ontario	10	1	—		—		2	3	12	4
Ottawa South United	2018	League1 Ontario	6	4	—		—		1	1	7	5
Ottawa South United	2019	League1 Ontario	1	0	—		—		—		1	0
Ottawa South United	2020	Première Ligue de soccer du Québec	7	0	—		—		—		7	0
Ottawa South United	2021	Première Ligue de soccer du Québec	7	1	—		—		—		7	1
Ottawa South United	Total		31	6	0	0	0	0	3	4	34	10
Atlético Ottawa	2021	Canadian Premier League	2	0	—		0	0	—		2	0
Fort Wayne FC	2022	USL League Two	8	0	—		0	0	—		8	0
Ottawa South United	2023	Première Ligue de soccer du Québec	15	1	—		—		1	0	16	1
Career total			56	7	0	0	0	0	4	4	60	11
