= Jaeden Mercure =

Canadian soccer player

Personal information
- Date of birth: March 14, 2003 (age 23)
- Height: 1.80 m (5 ft 11 in)
- Position: Forward

Youth career
- 2011–2017: Ottawa South United
- 2017–2018: Vancouver Whitecaps
- 2018–2020: Ottawa South United

College career
Years	Team	Apps	(Gls)
2024	Algonquin Wolves	9	(9)
2025–	Carleton Ravens	8	(2)

Senior career*
Years	Team	Apps	(Gls)
2019–2021	Ottawa South United	8	(1)
2021	Atlético Ottawa	5	(0)
2022–2023	Ottawa South United	18	(3)
2023–2024	Launceston United SC	10	(3)
2025–	Ottawa South United	7	(1)
- * Club domestic league appearances and goals as of September 23, 2025

Jaeden Mercure (born March 14, 2003) is a Canadian soccer player who plays as a midfielder for Ottawa South United in Ligue1 Québec.

== Early life ==
Mercure was born in Canada and is of Haitian descent.

Growing up, Mercure played hockey and soccer, joining Ottawa South United when he was nine years old. In 2017, he joined the Vancouver Whitecaps Academy Residency Program. Afterwards, he returned to OSU in 2018.

== College career ==
Mercure was set to attend MacEwan University and play for the men's soccer team beginning in 2021, but ultimately did not join them.

In 2024, he began attending Algonquin College, where he played for the men's soccer team. On September 14, 2024, he played his first game, scoring five goals and adding an assist in a 15-0 victory over Fleming College.

== Club career ==
On August 17, 2019, he made his debut for the senior team of Ottawa South United in League1 Ontario against Master's FA, which was his only appearance of the season. After appearing with the reserve squad in the 2020 season, he returned to the senior team in 2021, now in the Première Ligue de soccer du Québec.

On August 10, 2021, he joined Canadian Premier League club Atlético Ottawa, signing a Canadian Developmental contract, allowing his to retain his university eligibility, as well as to continue playing with his local team, Ottawa South United. The move was facilitated through the affiliation the two clubs. He made his professional debut on September 1, coming on as a substitute against York United FC.

In May 2023, he signed with Australian club Launceston United SC in NPL Tasmania.

== Career statistics ==
As of September 23, 2024

Club	Season	League			Playoffs		Domestic Cup		Other		Total	
Club	Season	Division	Apps	Goals	Apps	Goals	Apps	Goals	Apps	Goals	Apps	Goals
Ottawa South United	2019	League1 Ontario	1	0	–		–		–		1	0
Ottawa South United	2021	Première Ligue de soccer du Québec	7	1	–		–		–		7	1
Ottawa South United	Total		8	1	0	0	0	0	0	0	8	1
Atlético Ottawa	2021	Canadian Premier League	5	0	–		0	0	–		5	0
Ottawa South United	2022	Première Ligue de soccer du Québec	16	3	–		–		–		16	3
Ottawa South United	2023	Ligue1 Québec	2	0	–		–		–		2	0
Ottawa South United	Total		18	3	0	0	0	0	0	0	18	3
Launceston United SC	2023	NPL Tasmania	10	3	–		0	0	0	0	10	3
Launceston United SC	2024	NPL Tasmania	0	0	–		1	0	4 (Note: Appearances in NPL Summer Cup)	0	5	0
Launceston United SC	Total		10	3	0	0	1	0	4	0	11	3
Ottawa South United	2025	Ligue1 Québec	7	1	—		—		—		7	1
Career total			48	8	0	0	1	0	4	0	53	8
