= Antoine Coupland =

Canadian professional soccer player

Personal information
- Date of birth: December 12, 2003 (age 22)
- Place of birth: Chelsea, Quebec, Canada
- Height: 1.60 m (5 ft 3 in)
- Position: Midfielder

Youth career
- CS des Collines
- 2014–2019: Ottawa St. Anthony
- 2022–2023: Rijeka

Senior career*
Years	Team	Apps	(Gls)
2019	Ottawa Fury FC	3	(0)
2020–2021	Atlético Ottawa	18	(2)
2022–2023	Rijeka	0	(0)
2023–2025	Whitecaps FC 2	57	(5)
2025	→ Vancouver Whitecaps FC (loan)	2	(1)
- * Club domestic league appearances and goals as of September 19, 2025

Antoine Coupland (born December 12, 2003) is a Canadian professional soccer player who plays as a midfielder.

== Early life ==
Coupland grew up in Chelsea, Quebec and attended Collège Saint-Alexandre. He began playing youth soccer at age four with CS des Collines. He joined Ottawa St. Anthony SC's Futuro Soccer Academy program at age 11. When he was 14, he was invited to join the Montreal Impact Academy, but declined, due to feeling too young to move. In July 2019, he was set to go on trial with English club Sheffield United, but turned down the opportunity to instead sign a professional contract with his hometown team, Ottawa Fury.

== Club career ==
In July 2019, Coupland signed his first professional contract with Ottawa Fury FC of the USL Championship at age 15. At the age of 15 years old, Coupland became the youngest first-team player in the club's history and one of the youngest professional players in Canada. Coupland made his debut for the Fury on July 20, 2019, coming off the bench in the 85th of the game in a 4–0 victory over the Swope Park Rangers.

In March 2020, Coupland signed with new Canadian Premier League side Atlético Ottawa. He became the team's second-ever signing and first local player. However, his debut was ultimately delayed as the beginning of the season was postponed due to the COVID-19 pandemic. He made his debut on August 19 against Valour FC. He played in three of the club's seven total matches during the season, which was drastically shortened due to the COVID-19 pandemic, playing a total of 98 minutes. In January 2021, he re-signed with the club for the 2021 season. On July 11, 2021, Coupland scored his first professional goal, netting the second against Cavalry FC in a 2–0 victory. He scored his first home goal on October 24, 2021, against York United FC. He departed the club, following the season. Over his time with Atlético Ottawa, he scored two goals in eighteen appearances.

In November 2021, Coupland announced he was going on trial with clubs in Europe, upon turning 18, as it was his dream to play in Europe. He first went on trial with clubs in Portugal and Germany. He received an offer to join SC Braga's U23 team, following a three-week trial, but declined the offer, seeking a first team deal. Afterwards, he trialed with German clubs TSV 1860 Munich and VfB Stuttgart.

In February 2022, Coupland signed with Croatian First Football League side HNK Rijeka. He began playing with the U19 team, but quickly began training with the first team. In March 2023, he terminated his contract by mutual consent.

In 2023, he joined MLS Next Pro side Whitecaps FC 2. Initially reported to be a loan with a purchase option, after he terminated his contract with Rijeka, it was instead a permanent deal. He scored on his debut on March 26 against Portland Timbers 2. In December 2024, he re-signed with the team for the 2025 season. In June 2025, he signed a pair of short-term loans with the Vancouver Whitecaps FC first team. On June 25, 2025, he made his Major League Soccer debut and scored his first goal, in a substitute appearance, against San Diego FC.

== International career ==
In May 2022, Coupland was named to the 60-man provisional Canadian U-20 team for the 2022 CONCACAF U-20 Championship.

== Career statistics ==
As of September 19, 2025

Club	Season	League			Playoffs		Domestic Cup		Continental		Total	
Club	Season	Division	Apps	Goals	Apps	Goals	Apps	Goals	Apps	Goals	Apps	Goals
Ottawa Fury	2019	USL Championship	3	0	0	0	0	0	—		3	0
Atlético Ottawa	2020	Canadian Premier League	3	0	—		—		—		3	0
Atlético Ottawa	2021	Canadian Premier League	15	2	—		1	0	—		16	2
Atlético Ottawa	Total		18	2	0	0	1	0	0	0	19	2
HNK Rijeka	2022–23	Croatian Football League	0	0	—		0	0	0	0	0	0
Whitecaps FC 2	2023	MLS Next Pro	27	2	—		—		—		26	2
Whitecaps FC 2	2024	MLS Next Pro	11	0	1	0	—		—		12	0
Whitecaps FC 2	2025	MLS Next Pro	19	3	0	0	—		—		19	3
Whitecaps FC 2	Total		57	5	1	0	0	0	0	0	58	5
Vancouver Whitecaps FC (loan)	2025	Major League Soccer	2	1	0	0	0	0	0	0	2	1
Career total			78	8	1	0	1	0	0	0	82	8
