= João Morelli =

Brazilian footballer (born 1996)

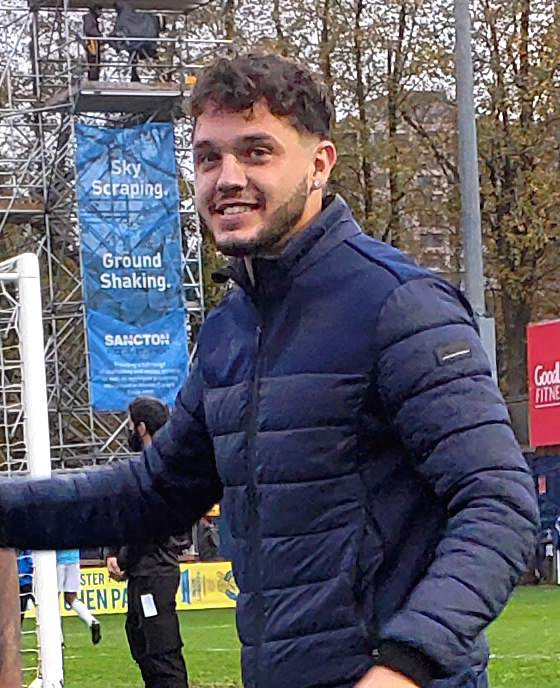
- Morelli with HFX Wanderers in 2021

Personal information
- Full name: João Morelli Neto
- Date of birth: 11 March 1996 (age 30)
- Place of birth: Itu, Brazil
- Height: 1.80 m (5 ft 11 in)
- Position: Forward

Youth career
- –2015: Ituano
- 2016-2018: Middlesbrough

Senior career*
Years	Team	Apps	(Gls)
2015–2018	Middlesbrough	0	(0)
2017	→ FCI Levadia (loan)	24	(16)
2018	Fleetwood Town	0	(0)
2018	Ituano	9	(2)
2019	FCI Levadia	33	(12)
2020–2023	HFX Wanderers	43	(24)
- * Club domestic league appearances and goals as of 28 November 2023

João Morelli Neto (born 11 March 1996) is a Brazilian former professional footballer who played as a forward.

== Early life ==
Morelli was born and raised in the city of Itu, São Paulo state. In 2013, he joined the under-17 team of local club Ituano, where he scored three goals in eight appearances, primarily as a substitute. The following year, he was promoted to the under-20 team, where he made another five appearances.

== Club career ==
=== Middlesbrough ===
In March 2015, Morelli signed a contract with EFL Championship side Middlesbrough until the end of the season, the result of Boro's partnership with Ituano. In the 2016–17 season, he made ten appearances in Premier League 2 for Middlesbrough's under-23 side, scoring two goals. Over the course of his first two years at the club, he scored eleven goals in 41 appearances in all competitions for Middlesbrough's under-23s.

==== Loan to FCI Levadia ====
On 20 February 2017, Morelli signed a one-year contract extension with Middlesbrough before going on a year-long loan to Estonian Meistriliiga side FCI Levadia Tallinn. In 22 league appearances that season, he scored sixteen goals, tying for fifth in league scoring. Morelli also played 90 minutes in both legs of Levadia's Europa League first qualifying round series against Irish club Cork City.

=== Fleetwood Town ===
On 31 January 2018, Morelli signed an 18-month contract with EFL League One side Fleetwood Town. Shortly after he signed for the club, manager Uwe Rösler was sacked and replaced by Joey Barton, under whom Morelli later recounted feeling "lost" after a drastic change of tactics and position. He subsequently failed to make a competitive appearance for the Fishermen and was released at the end of the season.

=== Return to Ituano ===
On 29 August 2018, Morelli returned to Ituano, where he made nine appearances and scored two goals in the Copa Paulista.

=== Return to Levadia ===
On 27 December 2018, Morelli returned to FCI Levadia, signing a two-year contract. He made 29 league appearances that season, scoring eleven goals. He also appeared for Levadia in the Estonian Supercup and scored a goal in one appearance in the Estonian Cup. Later in the season, he played every minute of both legs in Levadia's extra-time loss to Icelandic club Stjarnan in Europa League qualifying.

=== HFX Wanderers and retirement ===
On February 25, 2020, Morelli signed with Canadian Premier League side HFX Wanderers. He made his debut for the Wanderers on August 15 against Pacific FC, and converted a penalty in an eventual 2–2 draw. After a very strong 2021 season, Morelli was the Golden Boot winner in the CPL, netting 14 goals in 21 games and was nominated for the CPL Player of the Year award on December 5, 2021. On December 12, the Wanderers announced Morelli had signed a contract extension through 2023. Two days later, on December 14, at the CPL awards ceremony, Morelli was named the 2021 CPL Player of the Year.

During the Wanderers' second game of the 2022 season against Atlético Ottawa on April 16, Morelli suffered an ACL injury, ruling him out for the remainder of the season.

In July 2023, Morelli was officially cleared to play again, as the club signed him to a new contract extension, adding a club option for 2024. On July 31, he scored his first goal since returning from injury in a 2–0 league victory over York United. He went on to score four goals in nine appearances for Halifax, before missing out on the final games of the regular season, as well as the play-offs, due to a new injury.

On November 3, 2023, Morelli officially announced his retirement from football, citing his will to take care of his family as the main reason behind his choice. At the time of his retirement, the forward was the all-time leading scorer for the Wanderers, having scored 24 goals in 43 games for the club, as well as the joint-fifth highest scorer in the history of the CPL (22 goals). In June 2024, he was sanctioned for doping, receiving an 18 month ban, from a sample collected in August 2023 that tested positive for clomiphene metabolites.

== Career statistics ==
As of 13 August 2023

Club statistics
Club	Season	League			National Cup (Note: Includes appearances in the Estonian Cup and Canadian Championship.)		Continental (Note: Includes appearances in UEFA Europa League.)		Other (Note: Includes appearances in the EFL Trophy, Copa Paulista, Estonian Supercup, and Canadian Premier League playoffs)		Total	
Club	Season	Division	Apps	Goals	Apps	Goals	Apps	Goals	Apps	Goals	Apps	Goals
Middlesbrough U21	2016–17	–	—		—		—		3 (Note: Appearances in EFL Trophy)	0	3	0
FCI Levadia (loan)	2017	Meistriliiga	22	16	0	0	2	0	0	0	24	16
Fleetwood Town	2017–18	EFL League One	0	0	0	0	—		0	0	0	0
Ituano	2018	Campeonato Paulista	0	0	—		—		9	2	9	2
FCI Levadia	2019	Meistriliiga	29	11	1	1	2	0	1	0	33	12
HFX Wanderers	2020	Canadian Premier League	8	4	—		—		1	0	9	4
HFX Wanderers	2021	Canadian Premier League	21	14	2	1	—		—		23	15
HFX Wanderers	2022	Canadian Premier League	2	1	0	0	—		—		2	1
HFX Wanderers	2023	Canadian Premier League	9	4	0	0	—		0	0	9	4
HFX Wanderers	Total		40	23	2	1	0	0	1	0	43	24
Career total			91	50	3	2	4	0	14	2	112	54

== Honours ==
HFX Wanderers

- Canadian Premier League
  - Runners-up: 2020

=== Individual ===
- Meistriliiga Goal of the Month: October 2017
- Canadian Premier League Golden Boot: 2021
- Canadian Premier League Player of the Year: 2021
