= Malcolm Shaw (footballer) =

Trinidadian footballer (born 1995)

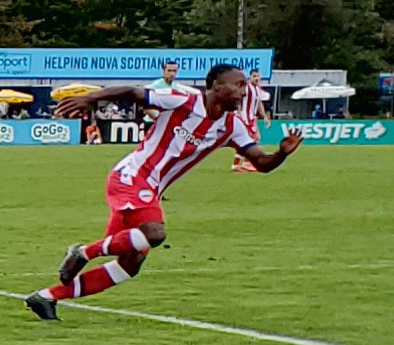
- Shaw with Atlético Ottawa in 2022

Personal information
- Full name: Malcolm Isaiah Shaw
- Date of birth: 27 July 1995 (age 31)
- Place of birth: Pickering, Ontario, Canada
- Height: 1.85 m (6 ft 1 in)
- Position: Forward

Team information
- Current team: St. Catharines Roma Wolves
- Number: 18

Youth career
- 2002–2010: Pickering FC
- 2010–2012: Power Soccer Academy
- Master's FA

College career
Years	Team	Apps	(Gls)
2013–2016	Roberts Wesleyan Redhawks	73	(27)

Senior career*
Years	Team	Apps	(Gls)
2017	Erie Commodores FC		(3)
2018	Råslätts SK	22	(13)
2019	Assyriska IK	24	(5)
2020–2023	Atlético Ottawa	77	(16)
2024	Cavalry FC	21	(1)
2025	Galway United	7	(0)
2026–	St. Catharines Roma Wolves	1	(1)

International career^{‡}
2023–	Trinidad and Tobago	8	(3)
- * Club domestic league appearances and goals as of 27 June 2026 ‡ National team caps and goals as of 8 June 2024

Malcolm Isaiah Shaw (born 27 July 1995) is a professional football player who plays as a forward for St. Catharines Roma Wolves in the Ontario Premier League. Born in Canada, he plays for the Trinidad and Tobago national team.

== Early life ==
Shaw played youth soccer with Pickering FC and Power Soccer Academy. During his college off-seasons, he trained with League1 Ontario club Master's FA.

== College career ==
In 2013, he began attending Roberts Wesleyan College, where he played for the men's soccer team. On September 9, 2014, he scored his first collegiate goal against the Pitt–Johnstown Mountain Cats.

In 2015, he was named to the NCCAA All-Midwest Region Second Team. On September 4, 2016, he scored a brace against the Chestnut Hill Griffins. In 2015, Shaw was named to the NCCAA All-Midwest Region Second Team and the ECC All-Conference Second Team.

On October 26, 2016, he scored a hat trick in a 5–2 victory over the Pitt–Johnstown Mountain Cats. In 2016, he was named to the National Soccer Coaches Association of America All-East Region All-American Third Team and the ECC All-Conference Second Team.

He led the team in scoring in both his junior and senior seasons in 2015 and 2016. Over his time with the Redhawks, he scored 27 goals in 73 appearances in four seasons.

While at Roberts Wesleyan, Shaw also represented the school in track & field in the javelin competition. He finished in 15th place at the 2016 NCAA Division II Track and Field Championships.

== Club career ==
=== Early career ===
In 2017, he played with National Premier Soccer League club Erie Commodores FC. He scored three goals during the season, helping Erie win the East Conference Division. He was named to the 2017 NPSL Midwest Conference East Division Second Team Best XI.

In 2018, Shaw joined Råslätts SK in the Swedish fourth tier. He scored his first goal on April 21, in a 2–0 victory over Hässleholms IF.

In February 2019, he signed with Assyriska IK in the third tier Ettan Södra. On May 30, he scored his first goals for the club, netting both goals in a 2–0 victory over Landskrona.

In 2020, he was set to move to IFK Värnamo, however, due to the COVID-19 pandemic, that move was not able to be completed. He was then set to set to the United States to trial with a USL club in Nebraska, however, he was unable to enter the country as his US passport did not arrive on time and he instead returned to Canada.

=== Atlético Ottawa ===
In June 2020, he signed a contract with Canadian Premier League expansion club Atlético Ottawa, after initially joining the club on a trial, after the club came across his profile on Transfermarkt. He scored a goal in his debut for the club on August 15 in a 2–2 draw against York9 FC. He helped Ottawa record their first ever victory, scoring a long-distance strike in a 2–0 victory over Cavalry FC, on August 27, 2020. He was a leading figure of the CPL player-led Black Lives Matter showing of solidarity that season.

In January 2021, he re-signed with the club. On July 21, 2021, Shaw scored a brace against Pacific FC. On August 14, 2021, Shaw scored Ottawa's first ever goal at their home stadium against HFX Wanderers FC.

In 2021, he led the team in scoring with 10 goals, also leading the team in shots and shots on target. Shaw was named the Capital City Supporters Group Golden Scarf winner as their player of the season for 2021.

In January 2022, he once again extended his contract, signing for an additional two seasons, with a club option for 2024. He departed the club after the 2023 season.

=== Cavalry FC ===
In April 2024, Shaw signed a one-year contract with an option for a further year with Canadian Premier League side Cavalry FC.

=== Galway United ===
In June 2025, Shaw signed for League of Ireland Premier Division club Galway United. On 14 November Shaw announced that he had departed the club after only half a season.

=== St. Catharines Roma Wolves ===
On 24 June 2026, Shaw signed for Ontario Premier League club St. Catharines Roma Wolves.

== International career ==
Born in Canada, Shaw was also eligible to represent Trinidad and Tobago, through his mother's heritage.

In June 2023, Shaw was named to the Trinidad and Tobago roster for the 2023 CONCACAF Gold Cup. He made his debut in their opening match of the tournament on June 25 against Saint Kitts and Nevis, as a substitute in an eventual 3–0 victory.

He was again called up in September 2023 for two CONCACAF Nations League matches against Curaçao and El Salvador. In the second match against El Salvador on September 11, Shaw scored his first goal in a 3–2 victory.

== Personal life ==
In addition to his soccer career, Shaw works part-time as a barber.

== Career statistics ==
=== Club ===
As of match played on 15 September 2025

Appearances and goals by club, season and competition
Club	Season	League			Playoffs		Domestic Cup		Continental		Total	
Club	Season	Division	Apps	Goals	Apps	Goals	Apps	Goals	Apps	Goals	Apps	Goals
Råslätts SK	2018	Swedish Division 2	22	13	—		0	0	—		22	13
Assyriska IK	2019	Ettan	24	5	—		2	3	—		26	8
Atlético Ottawa	2020	CPL	7	2	—		—		—		7	2
Atlético Ottawa	2021	CPL	28	10	—		0	0	—		28	10
Atlético Ottawa	2022	CPL	20	3	3	1	1	1	—		24	5
Atlético Ottawa	2023	CPL	22	1	—		2	1	—		24	2
Atlético Ottawa	Total		77	16	3	1	3	2	0	0	83	19
Cavalry FC	2024	CPL	21	1	2	0	3	1	0	0	26	2
Galway United	2025	LOI Premier Division	7	0	–		3	0	–		10	0
Career total			151	35	5	1	11	6	0	0	167	42

=== International ===
As of June 8, 2024

Caps and goals by national team and year
National team	Year	Apps	Goals
Trinidad and Tobago	2023	7	1
Trinidad and Tobago	2024	1	2
Total		8	3

List of international goals scored by Malcolm Shaw
No.	Date	Venue	Opponent	Score	Result	Competition
1	10 September 2023	Estadio Jorge "El Mágico" González, San Salvador, El Salvador	El Salvador	2–1	3–2	2023-24 CONCACAF Nations League
2	8 June 2024	SKNFA Technical Center, Basseterre, St. Kitts and Nevis	Bahamas	1–0	7–1	2026 FIFA World Cup qualification
3	8 June 2024	SKNFA Technical Center, Basseterre, St. Kitts and Nevis	Bahamas	6–0	7–1	2026 FIFA World Cup qualification
