= Chris Mannella =

Canadian soccer player (born 1994)

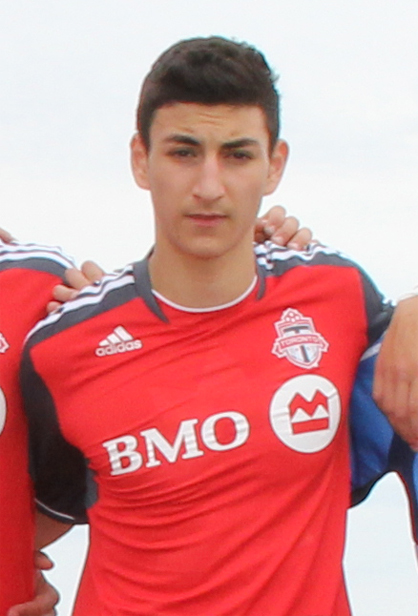
- Mannella with Toronto FC in 2012

Personal information
- Full name: Christopher Mannella
- Date of birth: June 7, 1994 (age 32)
- Place of birth: Toronto, Ontario, Canada
- Height: 1.80 m (5 ft 11 in)
- Positions: Midfielder; centre-back

Youth career
- 2003–2008: Spartacus SC
- 2009–2014: Toronto FC

College career
Years	Team	Apps	(Gls)
2012	Toronto Varsity Blues	13	(1)

Senior career*
Years	Team	Apps	(Gls)
2014	Toronto FC III	11	(2)
2014–2016	Toronto FC	0	(0)
2015–2016	→ Toronto FC II (loan)	38	(1)
2017	Vaughan Azzurri	15	(2)
2018–2019	Ottawa Fury	59	(0)
2020	York9	2	(0)
2021–2022	Atlético Ottawa	25	(0)
2023	Vaughan Azzurri	1	(0)

International career^{‡}
2015–2016	Canada U23	9	(0)
2015	Canada	3	(0)
- * Club domestic league appearances and goals as of April 12, 2023 ‡ National team caps and goals as of 00:42, May 20, 2016 (UTC)

Christopher Mannella (born June 7, 1994) is a Canadian former professional soccer player. He currently serves as the Academy Scouting Coordinator for the Philadelphia Union.

== Club career ==
=== Toronto FC ===
Mannella joined the youth academy of Toronto FC in 2009 to play in the Canadian Soccer League. In 2014, he was a part of the inaugural season of League1 Ontario with Toronto's senior Academy team. He was named the team's captain and made 11 appearances for the side as they captured the regular season championship.

On September 14, 2014, Mannella signed a homegrown player contract with Toronto FC, making him the 10th homegrown signing in club history.

Mannella was loaned to Toronto FC II on March 20, 2015 ahead of their inaugural season in the USL. He was named captain of the team upon his arrival. Mannella made his debut against the Charleston Battery on March 21. After two years with Toronto FC II, the club announced they would not pick up Mannella's contract option for the 2017 season.

=== Vaughan Azzurri ===
In 2017, Mannella played for League1 Ontario side Vaughan Azzurri, scoring two goals in fifteen appearances. He was subsequently named to the league Second All-Star team at the end of the season.

=== Ottawa Fury ===
On March 16, 2018, Mannella signed with the Ottawa Fury after trialing in pre-season. That year, he made 29 league appearances and another four in the Canadian Championship. In November 2018, The Fury announced Mannella would return for a second season in 2019.

In the 2019 season, Mannella made 30 league appearances and four in the Canadian Championship. He also started in Ottawa's playoff loss on penalties to Charleston Battery. The club ceased operations ahead of the 2020 season, making Mannella a free agent.

=== York United ===
On December 17, 2019, Mannella signed with Canadian Premier League side York9, which later was renamed York United beginning the 2021 season.

=== Atlético Ottawa ===
On April 6, 2021, Mannella signed with Canadian Premier League side Atlético Ottawa on a two-year deal. In late 2023, he announced his retirement from professional soccer.

== International career ==
On January 9, 2015, Mannella received his first call-up to the Canadian men's national team for friendlies against Iceland on January 16 and 19. He made his international debut a week later.

In May 2016, Mannella was called to Canada's U23 national team for a pair of friendlies against Guyana and Grenada. He saw action in both matches.

== Post-playing career ==
On July 30, 2024, he joined the Philadelphia Union as their Academy Scouting Coordinator.

== Career statistics ==
=== Club ===
As of April 18, 2023

Club statistics
Club	Season	League			Playoffs		National Cup (Note: Includes appearances in the Canadian Championship.)		Total	
Club	Season	Division	Apps	Goals	Apps	Goals	Apps	Goals	Apps	Goals
Toronto FC III	2014	League1 Ontario	11	2	0	0	—		11	2
Toronto FC II	2015	United Soccer League	16	1	—		—		16	1
Toronto FC II	2016	United Soccer League	22	0	—		—		22	0
Toronto FC II	Total		38	1	0	0	0	0	38	1
Vaughan Azzurri	2017	League1 Ontario	15	2	—		—		15	2
Ottawa Fury	2018	United Soccer League	29	0	—		4	0	33	0
Ottawa Fury	2019	USL Championship	30	0	1	0	4	0	35	0
Ottawa Fury	Total		59	0	1	0	8	0	68	0
York9	2020	Canadian Premier League	2	0	—		—		2	0
Atlético Ottawa	2021	Canadian Premier League	19	0	—		0	0	19	0
Atlético Ottawa	2022	Canadian Premier League	6	0	0	0	0	0	6	0
Atlético Ottawa	Total		25	0	0	0	0	0	25	0
Vaughan Azzurri	2023	League1 Ontario	1	0	0	0	1	0	2	0
Career total			152	5	8	0	2	0	161	5

=== International ===
As of March 3, 2020

Canada national team
Year	Apps	Goals
2015	3	0
Total	3	0

== Honours ==
Individual

- League1 Ontario Second Team All Star: 2017

Team

=== Atlético Ottawa ===
- Canadian Premier League
  - Regular Season: 2022
