= Raúl Uche =

Spanish footballer

Personal information
- Full name: Raúl Uche Rubio
- Date of birth: 8 October 1997 (age 29)
- Place of birth: Madrid, Spain
- Height: 1.80 m (5 ft 11 in)
- Position: Forward

Team information
- Current team: Cala Pozuelo

Youth career
- Rayo Vallecano

Senior career*
Years	Team	Apps	(Gls)
2015–2016	Rayo Vallecano B	5	(0)
2016–2020	Leicester City	0	(0)
2018	→ Betis Deportivo (loan)	15	(4)
2020–2021	Valladolid Promesas	22	(7)
2021	Atlético Ottawa	11	(0)
2022	Salamanca	13	(0)
2022	Waterford	6	(3)
2023	Guadalajara	2	(0)
2023	Tres Cantos	12	(2)
2024	San Agustín del Guadalix		
2024–	Cala Pozuelo	5	(0)
- * Club domestic league appearances and goals as of 13 October 2024

Raúl Uche Rubio (born 8 October 1997) is a Spanish professional footballer who plays as a forward for Tercera Federación club Cala Pozuelo.

== Early life ==
Uche was born in Madrid and developed in the youth system of Rayo Vallecano. In 2015, he joined the club's reserve side in the Tercera División, making five appearances that season.

== Club career ==
=== Leicester City ===
In 2016, Uche signed a four-year contract with Premier League champions Leicester City. In 2018, he went on loan with Betis Deportivo in Segunda División B, scoring four goals in fifteen league appearances, and making another two appearances in the promotion play-offs.

=== Valladolid Promesas ===
On 13 January 2020, after playing very little with Leicester's U-23 squad over his time at the club, Uche returned to Spain and signed with Segunda División B side Valladolid Promesas. That season, he made six league appearances, scoring one goal, and made one appearance in the promotion play-offs. The following year, he scored six goals in sixteen appearances.

=== Atlético Ottawa ===
On 28 July 2021, Uche signed with Canadian Premier League side Atlético Ottawa. He made his debut for the club on 2 August 2021 in a 2–1 loss to HFX Wanderers. Ottawa announced in January 2022 that they would not be exercising Uche's contract option, ending his time at the club after one season.

=== Salamanca ===
On 28 January 2022, Uche returned to Spain, signing with Segunda División RFEF side Salamanca UDS.

=== Waterford ===
On 1 September 2022, it was announced that Uche had signed for League of Ireland First Division club Waterford until the end of their season in November.

== Career statistics ==
As of match played on 11 November 2022

Club statistics
Club	Season	League			National Cup (Note: Includes appearances in the Canadian Championship.)		League Cup (Note: Includes appearances in the Copa Federación de España.)		Continental		Other		Total	
Club	Season	Division	Apps	Goals	Apps	Goals	Apps	Goals	Apps	Goals	Apps	Goals	Apps	Goals
Rayo Vallecano B	2015–16	Tercera División	5	0	—		0	0	—		0	0	5	0
Betis Deportivo (loan)	2017–18	Segunda División B	15	4	—		2	0	—		0	0	17	4
Real Valladolid Promesas	2019–20	Segunda División B	6	1	—		0	0	—		1	0	7	1
Real Valladolid Promesas	2020–21	Segunda División B	16	6	—		0	0	—		0	0	16	6
Real Valladolid Promesas	Total		22	7	0	0	0	0	0	0	1	0	23	7
Atlético Ottawa	2021	Canadian Premier League	4	0	1	0	—		—		0	0	5	0
Salamanca	2021–22	Segunda Federación	13	0	—		0	0	—		0	0	13	0
Waterford	2022	League of Ireland First Division	6	3	1	0	—		—		4 (Note: Appearances in 2022 League of Ireland promotion/relegation playoffs)	0	11	3
Career total			65	14	2	0	2	0	0	0	5	0	74	14
