= Teodor Obadal =

Canadian soccer player

Personal information
- Date of birth: 8 September 2001 (age 25)
- Place of birth: Belgrade, FR Yugoslavia
- Height: 1.90 m (6 ft 3 in)
- Position: Goalkeeper

Team information
- Current team: Lokomotiva Beograd

Youth career
- FK Lokomotiva Beograd
- Čukarički
- FK Lokomotiva Beograd

Senior career*
Years	Team	Apps	(Gls)
2017–2020	FK Lokomotiva Beograd	71	(0)
2021	Atlético Ottawa	2	(0)
2022	Kabel	4	(0)
2022-	FK Lokomotiva Beograd		
- * Club domestic league appearances and goals as of 02:15, 6 April 2022 (UTC) ‡ National team caps and goals as of August 29, 2021

Teodor Obadal (born 8 September 2001) is a Serbian professional footballer who plays as a goalkeeper for Serbian club Lokomotiva Beograd.

== Early life ==
Born and raised in Belgrade, Obadal joined the FK Lokomotiva Belgrad academy when he was nine years old. Afterwards, he joined the academy of FK Čukarički where he played for three years, before returning to the FK Lokomotiva Belgrad system when he was fourteen.

== Career ==
=== Club ===
After debuting at age 16 and more than 70 appearances for Serbian 3rd tier side Lokomotiva Beograd, Obadal left Serbia and signed with Canadian Premier League side Atlético Ottawa. He made his debut for Ottawa on August 21 in a Canadian Championship match against Valour FC.

=== International ===
In 2019, Obadal was called up to the Serbia U-19 squad for three friendlies. He is also eligible for Canada through his mother, and holds Canadian citizenship.
