= Miguel Acosta (footballer, born 1998) =

Spanish footballer

Personal information
- Full name: Miguel Acosta Mateos
- Date of birth: 16 March 1998 (age 28)
- Place of birth: Madrid, Spain
- Height: 1.75 m (5 ft 9 in)
- Position: Right-back

Team information
- Current team: Rayo Majadahonda
- Number: 15

Youth career
- 2010–2017: Atlético Madrid

Senior career*
| Years | Team | Apps | (Gls) |
| 2017 | Atlético Madrid B | 8 | (0) |
| 2017–2020 | Getafe B | 88 | (2) |
| 2020–2021 | Atlético Baleares | 13 | (0) |
| 2021–2023 | Atlético Ottawa | 78 | (4) |
| 2024 | La Nucía | 13 | (0) |
| 2024–2025 | Zagłębie Sosnowiec | 19 | (0) |
| 2025– | Rayo Majadahonda | 5 | (0) |
- * Club domestic league appearances and goals as of 15 May 2026

Miguel Acosta Mateos (born 16 March 1998) is a Spanish professional footballer who plays as a right-back for Segunda Federación club Rayo Majadahonda.

== Early life ==
Born in Madrid, Spain, Acosta joined the Atlético Madrid academy in 2010, where he remained until 2017.

== Club career ==
On 29 January 2017, he made his senior debut with Atlético Madrid B in the Tercera División against Unión Adarve.

In July 2017, Acosta signed with fellow Tercera División side Getafe B.

In August 2020, Acosta signed with Atlético Baleares in the Segunda División B. After one season, he departed the club.

In May 2021, Acosta signed with Canadian Premier League side Atlético Ottawa. He led the league in minutes played in 2021, with 2,430, playing the full 90 in every match, except for one match in which he was suspended due to yellow card accumulation. In January 2022, he extended his contract with the club through 2023, with a contract option for 2024. In July 2022, he was named CPL Player of the Week for Week 13. At the end of the 2023 season, he was named the Capital City Supporters Group "Player of the Season". Following the 2023 season, he departed the club, having made 85 appearances (and the club's all-time appearance holder at the time).

In February 2024, he signed with La Nucía in the Segunda Federación.

On 5 September 2024, Acosta joined Polish third-tier club Zagłębie Sosnowiec on a one-year deal, with an option for a further year. He was released by Zagłębie at the end of his contract in June 2025.

On 10 October 2025, Acosta signed with Rayo Majadahonda in the Spanish fourth division.

== Career statistics ==
As of match played 7 June 2025

Appearances and goals by club, season and competition
| Club | Season | League | | | National cup (Note: Includes Canadian Championship) | | Other | | Total | |
| Club | Season | Division | Apps | Goals | Apps | Goals | Apps | Goals | Apps | Goals |
|---|---|---|---|---|---|---|---|---|---|---|
| Atlético Madrid B | 2016–17 | Tercera División | 8 | 0 | — | | 0 | 0 | 8 | 0 |
| Getafe B | 2017–18 | Tercera División | 38 | 2 | — | | 0 | 0 | 38 | 2 |
| Getafe B | 2018–19 | Tercera División | 33 | 0 | — | | 1 (Note: Appearance in Tercera División promotion playoffs) | 0 | 34 | 0 |
| Getafe B | 2019–20 | Segunda División B | 17 | 0 | — | | — | | 17 | 0 |
| Getafe B | Total | | 88 | 2 | 0 | 0 | 1 | 0 | 89 | 2 |
| Atlético Baleares | 2020–21 | Segunda División B | 13 | 0 | 0 | 0 | — | | 13 | 0 |
| Atlético Ottawa | 2021 | Canadian Premier League | 27 | 2 | 1 | 0 | — | | 28 | 2 |
| Atlético Ottawa | 2022 | Canadian Premier League | 26 | 1 | 1 | 0 | 3 (Note: Appearances in Canadian Premier League play-offs) | 0 | 30 | 1 |
| Atlético Ottawa | 2023 | Canadian Premier League | 25 | 1 | 2 | 0 | — | | 27 | 1 |
| Atlético Ottawa | Total | | 78 | 4 | 4 | 0 | 3 | 0 | 85 | 3 |
| La Nucía | 2023–24 | Segunda Federación | 13 | 0 | — | | — | | 13 | 0 |
| Zagłębie Sosnowiec | 2024–25 | II liga | 19 | 0 | — | | — | | 19 | 0 |
| Career total | | | 219 | 6 | 4 | 0 | 4 | 0 | 227 | 6 |

== Honours ==
Atlético Ottawa

- Canadian Premier League regular season: 2022
