= Milovan Kapor =

Canadian soccer player (born 1991)

Personal information
- Full name: Milovan Kapor
- Date of birth: 5 August 1991 (age 35)
- Place of birth: Toronto, Ontario, Canada
- Height: 1.88 m (6 ft 2 in)
- Positions: Centre-back; defensive midfielder

Team information
- Current team: Hamsik Academy
- Number: 18

College career
Years	Team	Apps	(Gls)
2009–2013	UMBC Retrievers	57	(3)

Senior career*
Years	Team	Apps	(Gls)
2012	Bradenton Academics	13	(8)
2013	Baltimore Bohemians	7	(2)
2014	Cádiz	0	(0)
2015	Dukla Banská Bystrica	13	(1)
2015–2016	ŽP Šport Podbrezová	9	(1)
2016–2017	ViOn Zlaté Moravce	26	(1)
2017–2018	Hapoel Hadera	12	(0)
2018–2019	Gomel	39	(0)
2019–2020	Buxoro	15	(0)
2020–2021	Atlético Ottawa	27	(0)
2022	Pohronie	4	(0)
2022–	Hamsik Academy	35	(2)

Managerial career
- 2026-: Pohronie (assistant)
- * Club domestic league appearances and goals as of 12:46, 10 January 2024 (UTC)

Milovan Kapor (born 5 August 1991) is a Canadian professional soccer player who plays as a centre-back for Hamsik Academy in 3. Liga East.

== Club career ==
In 2012, he played in the USL Premier Development League with Bradenton Academics, and the following season with Baltimore Bohemians. He made his professional debut for Dukla Banská Bystrica against Spartak Trnava on 6 March 2015. In 2016, Kapor joined ViOn Zlaté Moravce.

On 10 August 2020, Kapor signed with Canadian Premier League side Atlético Ottawa. He made his debut on August 15 against York9.

== International career ==
On June 6, 2017 Kapor was named to Canada's 40-man preliminary roster for the 2017 CONCACAF Gold Cup.

== Personal life ==
Kapor is the cousin of fellow soccer player Stefan Kapor.
