= Raúl Tito =

Peruvian footballer (born 1997)

Personal information
- Full name: Raúl Alexánder Tito Cano
- Date of birth: 5 September 1997 (age 29)
- Place of birth: Villa María del Triunfo, Peru
- Height: 1.64 m (5 ft 5 in)
- Position: Winger

Team information
- Current team: Deportivo Garcilaso
- Number: 10

Youth career
- 2010–2013: Sport Boys

Senior career*
Years	Team	Apps	(Gls)
2014	Sport Boys	18	(3)
2015	Cienciano	30	(4)
2016–2017	Universitario	22	(2)
2017	→ Real Garcilaso (loan)	8	(1)
2018	Sport Rosario	32	(2)
2019	Cienciano	10	(1)
2020–2021	FC Edmonton	0	(0)
2020	→ Santos Nasca (loan)	8	(1)
2022	Inkas FC	6	(3)
2022-	Deportivo Garcilaso	13	(8)

International career^{‡}
2017	Peru U20	2	(0)
- * Club domestic league appearances and goals as of 25 April 2022 ‡ National team caps and goals as of 19 February 2020

Raúl Alexánder Tito Cano (born 5 September 1997) is a Peruvian professional footballer who plays as a winger for Peruvian club Deportivo Garcilaso.

== Club career ==
=== Sport Boys ===
Tito joined the academy of Peruvian Primera División side Sport Boys in 2010 at age 12, and signed for the first team in 2014. On 15 May 2014, he made his professional debut for Sport Boys in the Peruvian Segunda División in a 1–1 draw against Carlos A. Mannucci. That season, he went on to make a total of eighteen league appearances, scoring three goals.

=== Cienciano ===
In early 2020, Tito signed with Primera División side Cienciano. That season, he made 24 league appearances, scoring four goals, and made another six appearances in the Copa Inca.

=== Universitario ===
In 2016, Tito signed with Universitario de Deportes. That season, he made sixteen appearances, scoring two goals. The following season, he made six appearances before going on loan to fellow Primera División side Real Garcilaso on 17 August 2017. There, Tito made eight appearances and scored one goal.

=== Sport Rosario ===
In 2018, Tito signed with Sport Rosario. On 20 February, he made his continental debut in the Copa Sudamericana First Stage against Uruguayan side Cerro. Tito started both legs against Cerro, as Sport Rosario lost the series 2–0 on aggregate. In league play, Tito made a career-high 32 appearances, scoring three goals. After contract renewal talks broke down, Tito left Sport Rosario at the end of the 2018 season.

=== Return to Cienciano ===
On 25 January 2019, Tito signed with Cienciano for the second time, now as part of an attempt to earn promotion back to the Primera División after being relegated in the 2018 season. Tito made ten appearances that season, scoring one goal, as Cienciano won the league and earned direct promotion back to the top flight.

=== FC Edmonton ===
On 19 February 2020, Tito signed with Canadian Premier League side FC Edmonton. After being unable to join his new club for the shortened 2020 season due to COVID-19 travel restrictions, Tito was loaned to Peruvian Segunda División side Santos in October 2020. He made his loan debut as a substitute in a 1–0 win over Cultural Santa Rosa on 27 October 2020. Tito finished his loan with one goal in eight appearances.

On 8 January 2021, Tito re-signed with Edmonton for the 2021 season. On 21 June 2021, Tito and the club agreed to a mutual termination of his contract after he was again unable to travel to Canada due to the COVID-19 pandemic.

== International career ==
Tito represented Peru at the 2017 South American U-20 Championship, making a substitute appearance in a 2–0 loss to Bolivia and a start in a 2–0 loss to Uruguay.

== Career statistics ==
As of 18 December 2020

Club statistics
Club	Season	League			National Cup (Note: Includes appearances in the Copa Inca.)		Continental (Note: Includes appearances in the Copa Sudamericana.)		Other		Total	
Club	Season	Division	Apps	Goals	Apps	Goals	Apps	Goals	Apps	Goals	Apps	Goals
Sport Boys	2014	Peruvian Segunda División	18	3	—		—		0	0	18	3
Cienciano	2015	Peruvian Primera División	24	4	6	0	—		0	0	30	4
Universitario	2016	Peruvian Primera División	16	2	—		0	0	0	0	16	2
Universitario	2017	Peruvian Primera División	6	0	—		—		0	0	6	0
Universitario	Total		22	2	0	0	0	0	0	0	22	2
Real Garcilaso (loan)	2017	Peruvian Primera División	8	1	—		—		0	0	8	1
Sport Rosario	2018	Peruvian Primera División	32	3	—		2	0	0	0	34	3
Cienciano	2019	Peruvian Segunda División	10	1	—		—		0	0	10	1
Santos (loan)	2020	Peruvian Segunda División	8	1	—		—		0	0	8	1
Career total			122	15	6	0	2	0	0	0	130	15

== Honours ==
Universitario

- Peruvian Primera División: Apertura 2016

Cienciano

- Peruvian Segunda División: 2019
