= Dylon Powley =

Canadian soccer player (1996–2024)

Personal information
- Full name: Dylon Justin Powley
- Date of birth: September 5, 1996
- Place of birth: New Westminster, British Columbia, Canada
- Date of death: June 20, 2024 (aged 27)
- Place of death: Edmonton, Alberta, Canada
- Height: 1.88 m (6 ft 2 in)
- Position: Goalkeeper

Youth career
- Edmonton Juventus SC
- Edmonton Drillers SC

College career
Years	Team	Apps	(Gls)
2015–2016	MacEwan Griffins	20	(0)

Senior career*
Years	Team	Apps	(Gls)
2016–2017	Calgary Foothills FC	26	(0)
2018	Gute	18	(0)
2019–2020	FC Edmonton	7	(0)
2021	Atlético Ottawa	26	(0)
Total		77	(0)
Refereeing career
Domestic
Years	League	Role
2024	League1 Alberta	Referee
- * Club domestic league appearances and goals

Dylon Justin Powley (September 5, 1996 – June 20, 2024) was a Canadian soccer player who played as a goalkeeper.

== Early life ==
At age 4 or 5, Powley was diagnosed with Guillain–Barré syndrome. Powley played youth soccer with Edmonton Juventus SC and Edmonton Drillers SC. He also played with the Alberta provincial team at U15 and U16 level.

== University career ==
In 2015, Powley began attending MacEwan University, where he played for the men's soccer team. He led the Canada West Conference in saves in 2015 and 2016. In 2016, he was named the team's Most Outstanding Player.

== Club career ==
In 2016, Powley began playing with the Calgary Foothills in the Premier Development League. His penalty save against Seattle Sounders U-23 in the Northwest Division playoff game would begin Foothills' run to the PDL Championship that season, where they would ultimately lose out to the Michigan Bucks. He would be named the Foothills Rookie of the year, Foothills Fan Choice Award, and the PDL All Conference Playoff Goalkeeper of the Year for the 2016 season.

In late 2017, Powley went on trial with Swedish Football Division 2 side FC Gute, signing a contract in December effective January 2018. That season, he was nominated for the league goalkeeper of the year. He departed the club at the end of the season. After leaving Gute, Powley spent time on trial with Toronto FC II, where he also trained with the first team.

In January 2019, Powley signed with his hometown club, Canadian Premier League side FC Edmonton. He made eight appearances, across all competitions, in his rookie season. At the end of the 2019 season, Powley was released by the club, upon the expiration of his contract. However, the following month, Powley re-signed with Edmonton for the 2020 season. Following the 2020 season, he departed the club, in search of more playing time.

In April 2021, Powley signed with Atlético Ottawa for 2021. He led the league in minutes played, finishing with the second most saves in the season, as Atletico finished bottom of the league table. He departed the club at the end of the season. During the season, he was a leading figure in the league's players' attempts to unionize. On February 1, 2022, Powley announced his retirement from the sport.

== After playing career ==
Powley held a Canadian Youth Coaching License. During his playing career, he regularly served as a guest coach with various youth clubs. In January 2022, Powley joined the Whitecaps FC Alberta Academy as a youth coach. He also opened his own goalkeeping academy. In addition, he also served as a coach with youth club St. Albert Impact. He also became a referee for League1 Alberta in 2024.

In 2023, following the death of his brother, he became an advocate for mental health awareness, raising money for charity.

On June 20, 2024, Powley died in a motorcycle crash in Edmonton, at the age of 27. In November 2024, the Foot Soldiers, the supporters group of Cavalry FC (who previously were the supporters group of the Calgary Foothills, Powley's former club), renamed their player of the year trophy the Dylon Powley Memorial Trophy, in honour of Powley.

== Career statistics ==
Appearances and goals by club, season and competition
Club	Season	League			Playoffs		National cup		Continental		Total	
Club	Season	Division	Apps	Goals	Apps	Goals	Apps	Goals	Apps	Goals	Apps	Goals
Calgary Foothills	2016	Premier Development League	12	0	5	0	—		—		17	0
Calgary Foothills	2017	Premier Development League	14	0	1	0	—		—		15	0
Calgary Foothills	Total		26	0	6	0	0	0	0	0	32	0
FC Gute	2018	Division 2	18	0	—		1	0	—		19	0
FC Edmonton	2019	Canadian Premier League	6	0	—		2	0	—		8	0
FC Edmonton	2020	Canadian Premier League	1	0	—		—		—		1	0
FC Edmonton	Total		7	0	0	0	2	0	0	0	9	0
Atlético Ottawa	2021	Canadian Premier League	26	0	—		0	0	—		26	0
Career Total			77	0	6	0	3	0	0	0	86	0
