= Matthew Arnone =

Canadian soccer player (born 1994)

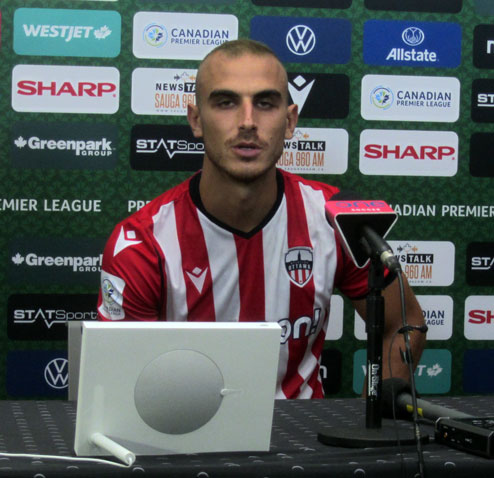
- Arnone in 2021

Personal information
- Date of birth: February 28, 1994 (age 32)
- Place of birth: Vaughan, Ontario, Canada
- Height: 1.88 m (6 ft 2 in)
- Positions: Centre-back; midfielder

Youth career
- Vaughan Azzurri
- 2010–2012: Toronto FC

College career
Years	Team	Apps	(Gls)
2012–2016	York Lions	70	(5)

Senior career*
Years	Team	Apps	(Gls)
2014–2016	Vaughan Azzurri	5+	(0+)
2017	North Carolina FC U23	14	(1)
2017–2018	Vaughan Azzurri	25	(1)
2019	HFX Wanderers	24	(2)
2020	York9	2	(0)
2021	Atlético Ottawa	14	(1)
Total		84+	(5)
- * Club domestic league appearances and goals as of 13 January 2022

Matthew Arnone (born February 28, 1994) is a Canadian former professional soccer player who played as a centre-back and midfielder.

== Early life ==
Arnone played youth soccer with Vaughan Azzurri, later joining the Toronto FC Academy for two years.

== University career ==
In 2012, Arnone began attending York University, where he played for the men's soccer team. In 2015, he was named team captain. In January 2016, he received York's Men's Soccer Sport Excellence Award. At the end of the 2016 season, he was named an OUA West Second-Team All-Star. After the season, he again received York's Men's Soccer Sport Excellence Award and won York's Charles Saundercook Memorial Trophy.

== Club career ==
In 2014, Arnone began playing for League1 Ontario side Vaughan Azzurri. In 2017, he played with North Carolina FC U23 in the Premier Development League. He then returned to Vaughan Azzurri for the second half of 2017 and 2018. He won the league and cup double with Vaughan in 2018.

In the winter of 2018–19, Arnone spent five months training with Italian Serie D side Vis Artena. In May 2019, he signed a contract with the HFX Wanderers of the Canadian Premier League. At the end of the season, he was named the Player of the Year by the supporters group of the team.

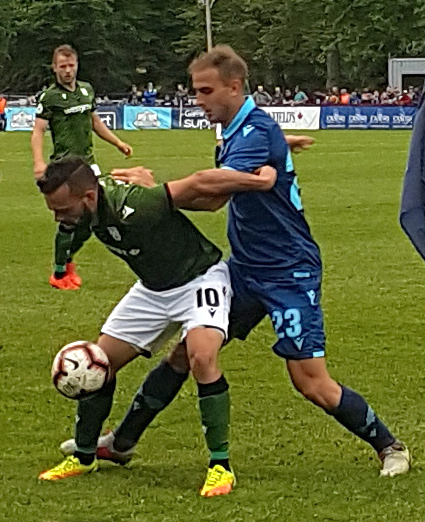
Arnone (right) playing for HFX Wanderers in 2019

In February 2020, Arnone signed with York9. At the end of the season, he departed the club.

In August 2021, Arnone signed with Atlético Ottawa. He scored his first goal on November 7, in a 1-1 draw against HFX Wanderers FC, immediately getting sent off after earning a second yellow for kicking the corner flag during his celebration.

== Personal life ==
Along with his mother, Arnone founded a charity known as Jason's Wish, raising money for the Sunnybrook Hospital Trauma Care Centre, in honour of his older brother, who died in a car accident.

== Honours ==
Vaughan Azzurri

- League1 Ontario Cup: 2016, 2018
- League1 Ontario: 2018

HFX Wanderers

- Player of the Year: 2019
