= Tevin Shaw =

Jamaican footballer (born 1997)

Personal information
- Full name: Tevin Andrae Shaw
- Date of birth: 24 February 1997 (age 29)
- Place of birth: Jamaica
- Height: 1.77 m (5 ft 10 in)
- Position: Midfielder

Team information
- Current team: Arnett Gardens F.C.

Youth career
- –2014: Boys' Town

Senior career*
Years	Team	Apps	(Gls)
2014–2016	Boys' Town	9	(0)
2016–2019	Tivoli Gardens	85	(4)
2019–2020	Portmore United	21	(1)
2020–2021	Atlético Ottawa	17	(0)
2022	FC Tucson	18	(0)
2023	Greenville Triumph	20	(0)

International career^{‡}
2018–	Jamaica	6	(0)
- * Club domestic league appearances and goals as of 22:40, 16 October 2023 (UTC) ‡ National team caps and goals as of 08:42, 23 October 2019 (UTC)

Tevin Shaw (born 24 February 1997) is a Jamaican professional footballer who plays as a midfielder for Arnett Gardens F.C. and the Jamaica national team.

== Club career ==
=== Boys' Town ===
Shaw played youth football with National Premier League side Boys' Town, where he captained the club's youth sides from the U13 to U20 level. In 2014, he signed his first professional contract with the club. Shaw made four appearances for Boys' Town that season, and made another five the following year.

=== Tivoli Gardens ===
In summer 2016, Shaw signed with Tivoli Gardens. He made 31 league appearances that season, scoring one goal, and started both legs of Tivoli's playoff series against Portmore United. The following season, Shaw made another 27 league appearances, scoring two goals, and again started in both legs of Tivoli's playoff series, this time against Cavalier. In the 2018–19 season, he made 27 league appearances, scoring one goal.

=== Portmore United ===
In summer 2019, Shaw signed with defending champions Portmore United. That season he made 21 league appearances, scoring one goal, and played 90 minutes in the away leg of Portmore's CONCACAF Champions League series against Mexican giants Cruz Azul.

=== Atlético Ottawa ===
On 26 March 2020, Shaw signed for Canadian Premier League side Atlético Ottawa. However, due to the COVID-19 pandemic, he was unable to join the side for the 2020 season, meaning he spent the year without any competitive football. But despite this, he was re-signed by Ottawa in 2021.

=== FC Tucson ===
On 1 February 2022, FC Tucson announced the signing of Tevin Shaw.

=== Greenville Triumph SC ===
Following Tucson's voluntary self-relegation to USL League Two, Shaw signed with Greenville Triumph on 12 January 2023.

== International career ==
Shaw received his first call-up to the Jamaica national team in May 2017 for a warm-up friendly against Peru ahead of the 2017 Caribbean Cup. He ultimately missed out on the Caribbean Cup due a quadriceps injury. Shaw made his debut for Jamaica on 30 January 2018 in a friendly against South Korea.

== Career statistics ==
=== Club ===
As of 15 February 2020

Appearances and goals by club, season and competition
Club	Season	League			National cup		Continental (Note: Includes appearances in CONCACAF Champions League.)		Other (Note: Includes appearances in the National Premier League Playoffs.)		Total	
Club	Season	Division	Apps	Goals	Apps	Goals	Apps	Goals	Apps	Goals	Apps	Goals
Boys' Town	2014–15	National Premier League	4	0	0	0	—		0	0	4	0
Boys' Town	2015–16	National Premier League	5	0	—		—		0	0	5	0
Boys' Town	Total		9	0	0	0	0	0	0	0	9	0
Tivoli Gardens	2016–17	National Premier League	31	1	0	0	—		2	0	33	1
Tivoli Gardens	2017–18	National Premier League	27	2	—		—		2	0	29	2
Tivoli Gardens	2018–19	National Premier League	27	1	—		—		0	0	27	1
Tivoli Gardens	Total		85	4	0	0	0	0	4	0	89	4
Portmore United	2019–20	National Premier League	21	1	—		1	0	0	0	22	1
Atlético Ottawa	2020	Canadian Premier League	0	0	0	0	—		0	0	0	0
Career total			115	5	0	0	1	0	4	0	120	5

=== International ===
As of 26 March 2020

Appearances and goals by national team and year
National team	Year	Apps	Goals
Jamaica	2018	6	0
Total		6	0
