= Alberto Soto (footballer, born 2001) =

Spanish footballer

Personal information
- Full name: Alberto Soto Maldonado
- Date of birth: 17 March 2001 (age 25)
- Place of birth: San Sebastián de los Reyes, Spain
- Height: 1.70 m (5 ft 7 in)
- Position: Midfielder

Team information
- Current team: UCAM Murcia
- Number: 20

Youth career
- Málaga
- –2020: Atlético Madrid

Senior career*
| Years | Team | Apps | (Gls) |
| 2020–2022 | Atlético Madrid B | 13 | (0) |
| 2020–2021 | → La Nucía (loan) | 12 | (0) |
| 2021 | → Atlético Ottawa (loan) | 19 | (2) |
| 2022–2023 | Vitória SC B | 24 | (0) |
| 2023–2025 | Marbella | 56 | (7) |
| 2025– | UCAM Murcia | 34 | (8) |
- * Club domestic league appearances and goals as of 15 May 2026

Alberto Soto Maldonado (born 17 March 2001) is a Spanish professional footballer who plays as a midfielder for Segunda Federación club UCAM Murcia.

== Career ==
In 2020, Soto was sent on loan to Spanish third division side La Nucía from Atlético Madrid. In 2021, he was sent on loan to Canadian team Atlético Ottawa. On 22 July 2021, he debuted for Atlético Ottawa during a 2–4 loss to Pacific FC.

On 30 August 2022, Portuguese club Vitória SC announced the signing of Soto on a two-year contract. The player joined the B team, who competed in Liga 3.

On 4 August 2023, Segunda Federación side Marbella announced the signing of Soto on a two-year deal. In the 2023–24 Segunda Federación season, Soto contributed to Marbella's promotion to the third-tier Primera Federación.
