= 2020 Valour FC season =

Valour FC
2020 season
- President: Wade Miller
- Head coach: Rob Gale
- Stadium: IG Field
- Canadian Premier League: 6th
- Canadian Championship: Did not qualify
- Top goalscorer: 8 players (1 goal each)
Home colours	Away colours

The 2020 Valour FC season was the second season in the club's history, as well as the second season in Canadian Premier League history.

== Current squad ==
As of August 12, 2020.

No.	Name	Nationality	Position(s)	Date of birth (age)	Previous club
Goalkeepers
0	Matt Silva	(Canada)	GK	March 28, 1991 (aged 29)	(Canada) York9 FC
1	James Pantemis	(Canada)	GK	February 21, 1997 (aged 23)	(Canada) Montreal Impact
Defenders
2	Raphaël Garcia	(Canada)	RB	June 5, 1999 (aged 21)	(Canada) Montreal Impact Academy
3	Chakib Hocine	(Algeria)	CB	August 8, 1991 (aged 29)	(Canada) HFX Wanderers
4	Yohan Le Bourhis	(Canada)	CB	March 9, 2000 (aged 20)	(Canada) A.S. Blainville
5	Julian Dunn	(Canada)	CB	July 11, 2000 (aged 20)	(Canada) Toronto FC
29	Arnold Bouka Moutou	(Republic of the Congo)	LB	November 28, 1988 (aged 32)	(France) Dijon
35	Andrew Jean-Baptiste	(Haiti)	CB	June 16, 1992 (aged 28)	(Sweden) Umeå FC
48	Dante Campbell	(Canada)	CB / DM	May 22, 1999 (aged 21)	(Canada) Toronto FC II
	Amir Soto (Note: Player is signed, but hasn't been added to the 2020 roster because of difficulties getting into Canada due to the COVID-19 pandemic)	(Panama)	CB	November 4, 1997 (aged 23)	(Panama) CD Universitario
Midfielders
6	Moses Dyer	(New Zealand)	CM	March 21, 1997 (aged 23)	(Norway) Florø SK
8	Diego Gutiérrez	(Canada)	RM / RB	February 18, 1997 (aged 23)	(Chile) Palestino
10	Dylan Carreiro	(Canada)	MF	January 20, 1995 (aged 25)	(Canada) Woodbridge Strikers
14	Stefan Cebara	(Canada)	RW / LW	April 12, 1991 (aged 29)	(Serbia) Vojvodina Novi Sad
17	Brett Levis	(Canada)	MF	March 29, 1993 (aged 27)	(Canada) Vancouver Whitecaps
21	José Galán	(Spain)	CM	February 2, 1986 (aged 34)	(Saudi Arabia) Al-Jabalain
25	Solomon Kojo Antwi	(Ghana)	MF	September 25, 2000 (aged 20)	(Ghana) Glow Lamp Academy
27	Raphael Ohin	(Ghana)	CM	May 25, 1995 (aged 25)	(Canada) WSA Winnipeg
33	Fraser Aird	(Canada)	MF	February 2, 1995 (aged 25)	(Scotland) Cove Rangers
77	Federico Peña	(Trinidad and Tobago)	MF	March 30, 1999 (aged 21)	(Belgium) Standard Liège
Forwards
7	Masta Kacher	(Algeria)	CF / AM	November 8, 1995 (aged 25)	(United States) Saint Louis FC
9	Austin Ricci	(Canada)	ST	April 8, 1996 (aged 24)	(Canada) York9 FC
11	Shaan Hundal	(Canada)	CF	July 14, 1999 (aged 21)	(Canada) Toronto FC II
16	Daryl Fordyce	(Northern Ireland)	CF	January 2, 1987 (aged 33)	(Republic of Ireland) Sligo Rovers

== Transfers ==
=== In ===
==== Transferred in ====
No.	Pos.	Player	Transferred from	Fee/notes	Date	Source
25	MF	(Ghana) Solomon Kojo Antwi	(Ghana) Glow Lamp Academy	Free transfer	December 30, 2019	
16	FW	(Northern Ireland) Daryl Fordyce	(Republic of Ireland) Sligo Rovers	Free transfer	January 10, 2020	
35	DF	(Haiti) Andrew Jean-Baptiste	(Sweden) Umeå FC	Free transfer	January 14, 2020	
33	MF	(Canada) Fraser Aird	(Scotland) Cove Rangers	Free transfer	January 24, 2020	
17	MF	(Canada) Brett Levis	(Canada) Vancouver Whitecaps	Free transfer	January 30, 2020	
	DF	(Panama) Amir Soto	(Panama) CD Universitario	Free transfer	February 7, 2020	
6	MF	(New Zealand) Moses Dyer	(Norway) Florø SK	Free transfer	February 14, 2020	
29	DF	(Republic of the Congo) Arnold Bouka Moutou	(France) Dijon	Free transfer	February 28, 2020	
14	MF	(Canada) Stefan Cebara	Unattached	Free transfer	April 3, 2020	
7	FW	(Algeria) Masta Kacher	(United States) Saint Louis FC	Free transfer	April 3, 2020	
00	GK	(Canada) Matt Silva	(Canada) York9 FC	Free transfer	June 16, 2020	
9	FW	(Canada) Austin Ricci	(Canada) York9 FC	Free transfer	July 10, 2020	
11	FW	(Canada) Shaan Hundal	(Canada) Toronto FC II	Free transfer	July 17, 2020	
3	DF	(Algeria) Chakib Hocine	(Canada) HFX Wanderers	Free transfer	July 20, 2020	

==== Loans in ====
No.	Pos.	Player	Loaned from	Fee/notes	Date	Source
1	GK	(Canada) James Pantemis	(Canada) Montreal Impact	Season-long loan	March 6, 2020	
5	DF	(Canada) Julian Dunn	(Canada) Toronto FC	Season-long loan	August 10, 2020	
48	DF	(Canada) Dante Campbell	(Canada) Toronto FC II	Season-long loan	August 10, 2020	

==== Draft picks ====
Valour FC selected the following players in the 2019 CPL–U Sports Draft on November 11, 2019. Draft picks are not automatically signed to the team roster. Only those who are signed to a contract will be listed as transfers in.

Round	Selection	Player	Position	Nationality	University
1	2	Marcus Campanile	CAM	Scotland	CBU Capers
2	13	Charlie Waters	ST	England	CBU Capers

=== Out ===
==== Transferred out ====
No.	Pos.	Player	Transferred to	Fee/notes	Date	Source
15	DF	(England) Adam Mitter	(Indonesia) Persiraja Banda Aceh	Contract expired	November 29, 2019	
20	MF	(Croatia) Josip Golubar	(Austria) SV Neuberg	Contract expired	November 29, 2019	
11	MF	(Canada) Glenn Muenkat		Contract expired	November 29, 2019	
5	MF	(Canada) Louis Béland-Goyette	(Canada) HFX Wanderers	Contract expired	January 7, 2020	
4	DF	(Canada) Jordan Murrell	(United States) Las Vegas Lights	Released	January 17, 2020	
6	DF	(Uruguay) Martín Arguiñarena	(Uruguay) Villa Teresa	Contract expired	January 17, 2020	
9	MF	(Canada) Michael Petrasso	(Canada) York9 FC	Contract expired	January 24, 2020	
7	MF	(Canada) Dylan Sacramento	(Republic of Ireland) Galway United	Contract expired	January 26, 2020	
22	MF	(Canada) Marco Bustos	(Canada) Pacific FC	Contract expired	January 30, 2020	
16	FW	(Canada) Tyler Attardo	(Chile) Fernández Vial	Undisclosed Fee	February 20, 2020	
3	DF	(Canada) Skylar Thomas	(United States) Pittsburgh Riverhounds	Contract expired	February 25, 2020	
26	GK	(Belgium) Mathias Janssens		Contract expired	February 26, 2020	
23	FW	(Canada) Ali Musse	(Germany) 1. FCA Darmstadt	Contract expired	February 26, 2020	
17	FW	(Italy) Michele Paolucci		Contract expired	April 17, 2020	
1	GK	(Canada) Tyson Farago		Contract expired	June 16, 2020	
14	MF	(Canada) Nicolás Galvis		Contract expired	August 10, 2020	

== Canadian Premier League ==
Match times are Central Daylight Time (UTC−5).

=== First stage ===
==== Table ====
Pos	Team	Pld	W	D	L	GF	GA	GD	Pts	Qualification
1	Cavalry	7	4	1	2	10	7	+3	13	Advance to group stage
2	HFX Wanderers	7	3	3	1	12	7	+5	12 (Note: Head-to-head points: HFX Wanderers 1, Forge 1. Goal differential: HFX Wanderers +5, Forge +4)	Advance to group stage
3	Forge	7	3	3	1	13	9	+4	12	Advance to group stage
4	Pacific	7	3	2	2	10	8	+2	11	Advance to group stage
5	York9	7	2	4	1	8	7	+1	10	
6	Valour	7	2	2	3	8	9	−1	8 (Note: Head-to-head points: Valour 3, Atlético Ottawa 0.)	
7	Atlético Ottawa	7	2	2	3	7	12	−5	8	
8	FC Edmonton	7	0	1	6	5	14	−9	1	

Source: CanPL.ca
Rules for classification: 1) points; 2) head-to-head points; 3) goal differential; 4) goals for; 5) total wins; 6) U-21 minutes; 7) coin toss or drawing of lots.

==== Results by match ====
Match	1	2	3	4	5	6	7
Result	L	W	D	L	W	L	D
Position	7	3	3	7	5	7	6

Source: #Matches
W = Win; D = Draw; L = Loss

==== Matches ====
August 16 1	Valour FC	0–2	Cavalry FC	Charlottetown, Prince Edward Island
11:00am	Aird (yellow card) 37'; Campbell (yellow card) 69'	Report	Camargo (yellow card) 11', (goal) 33' (pen.); Haber 29'; Adekugbe (yellow card) 46'; Boskovic (yellow card) 49'	Stadium: Alumni Field; Referee: Juan Marquez

August 19 2	Atlético Ottawa	0–4	Valour FC	Charlottetown, Prince Edward Island
12:00pm	Kapor (yellow card) 8' (yellow-red card) 64'; Martínez (yellow card) 29'	Report	Aird (yellow card) 4', (goal) 65' (pen.); Ricci (yellow card) 29'; Jean-Baptiste 78'; Kacher (yellow card) 81'; Carreiro 90'; Galán 90+1'	Stadium: Alumni Field; Referee: Filip Dujic

August 22 3	York9 FC	0–0	Valour FC	Charlottetown, Prince Edward Island
12:00pm	Aparicio (yellow card) 22'; Telfer (yellow card) 68'	Report	Ohin (yellow card) 22'; Hundal (yellow card) 90+2'	Stadium: Alumni Field; Referee: Carly Shaw-MacLaren

August 25 4	Pacific FC	2–0	Valour FC	Charlottetown, Prince Edward Island
7:00pm	Díaz 4'; Dixon (yellow card) 33'; Blasco 83'	Report	Ricci (yellow card) 68'	Stadium: Alumni Field; Referee: David Barrie

August 29 5	Valour FC	2–1	FC Edmonton	Charlottetown, Prince Edward Island
11:00am	Fordyce 61'; Ricci (yellow card) 68'; Cebara (yellow card) 81'; Carreiro (yellow card) 83'; Kacher 88'	Report	Lee (yellow card) 36'; Zetterberg (yellow card) 65'; Ongaro 73'; Ameobi (yellow card) 81'	Stadium: Alumni Field; Referee: Pierre-Luc Lauzière

September 2 6	Valour FC	0–2	HFX Wanderers FC	Charlottetown, Prince Edward Island
12:00pm	Galán (yellow card) 35'; Levis (yellow card) 73'; Peña 88	Report	De Carolis 36' (yellow card) 67'; Bent 40'; Oxner (yellow card) 90+4'	Stadium: Alumni Field; Referee: Filip Dujic

September 5 7	Forge FC	2–2	Valour FC	Charlottetown, Prince Edward Island
11:00am	Bekker 8'; Achinioti-Jönsson 65'	Report	Le Bourhis 14'; Dyer 27'; Aird (yellow card) 43'; Gutiérrez (yellow card) 59'; Galán (yellow card) 71'	Stadium: Alumni Field; Referee: David Barrie

== Statistics ==
=== Squad and statistics ===
As of September 5, 2020

No.	Pos	Nat	Player	Total		Canadian Premier League	
No.	Pos	Nat	Player	Apps	Goals	Apps	Goals
0	GK	(Canada) CAN	Matt Silva	0	0	0+0	0
1	GK	(Canada) CAN	James Pantemis	7	0	7+0	0
2	DF	(Canada) CAN	Raphaël Garcia	1	0	0+1	0
3	DF	(Algeria) ALG	Chakib Hocine	1	0	0+1	0
4	DF	(Canada) CAN	Yohan Le Bourhis	1	1	1+0	1
5	DF	(Canada) CAN	Julian Dunn	7	0	7+0	0
6	MF	(New Zealand) NZL	Moses Dyer	6	1	3+3	1
7	FW	(Algeria) ALG	Masta Kacher	6	1	4+2	1
8	MF	(Canada) CAN	Diego Gutiérrez	7	0	5+2	0
9	FW	(Canada) CAN	Austin Ricci	6	0	4+2	0
10	MF	(Canada) CAN	Dylan Carreiro	7	1	3+4	1
11	FW	(Canada) CAN	Shaan Hundal	6	0	2+4	0
14	MF	(Canada) CAN	Stefan Cebara	6	0	6+0	0
16	FW	(Northern Ireland) NIR	Daryl Fordyce	5	1	2+3	1
17	MF	(Canada) CAN	Brett Levis	5	0	5+0	0
21	MF	(Spain) ESP	José Galán	5	1	3+2	1
25	MF	(Ghana) GHA	Solomon Kojo Antwi	4	0	1+3	0
27	MF	(Ghana) GHA	Raphael Ohin	7	0	6+1	0
29	DF	(Republic of the Congo) CGO	Arnold Bouka Moutou	2	0	1+1	0
33	MF	(Canada) CAN	Fraser Aird	6	1	6+0	1
35	DF	(Haiti) HAI	Andrew Jean-Baptiste	6	1	6+0	1
48	MF	(Canada) CAN	Dante Campbell	5	0	2+3	0
77	FW	(Trinidad and Tobago) TTO	Federico Peña	6	0	4+2	0

=== Top scorers ===
Rank	Nat.	Player	Pos.	Canadian Premier League	TOTAL
1	(Canada)	Fraser Aird	MF	1	1
1	(Canada)	Dylan Carreiro	MF	1	1
1	(Haiti)	Andrew Jean-Baptiste	DF	1	1
1	(Spain)	José Galán	MF	1	1
1	(Algeria)	Masta Kacher	FW	1	1
1	(New Zealand)	Moses Dyer	MF	1	1
1	(Northern Ireland)	Daryl Fordyce	FW	1	1
1	(Canada)	Yohan Le Bourhis	DF	1	1
Totals				8	8

Updated to match played September 7, 2020
Source: Canadian Premier League

=== Top assists ===
Rank	Nat.	Player	Pos.	Canadian Premier League	TOTAL
1	(Canada)	Shaan Hundal	FW	2	2
1	(Canada)	Brett Levis	MF	2	2
3	(Spain)	José Galán	MF	1	1
Totals				5	5

Updated to match played September 7, 2020
Source: Canadian Premier League

=== Clean sheets ===
Rank	Nat.	Player	Canadian Premier League	TOTAL
1	(Canada)	James Pantemis	2	2
Totals			2	2

Updated to match played September 7, 2020
Source: Canadian Premier League

=== Disciplinary record ===
No.	Pos.	Nat.	Player	Canadian Premier League		TOTAL	
No.	Pos.	Nat.	Player	Booked	Sent off (straight red)	Booked	Sent off (straight red)
7	FW	(Algeria)	Masta Kacher	1	0	1	0
8	MF	(Canada)	Diego Gutiérrez	1	0	1	0
9	FW	(Canada)	Austin Ricci	3	0	3	0
10	FW	(Canada)	Dylan Carreiro	1	0	1	0
11	FW	(Canada)	Shaan Hundal	1	0	1	0
14	DF	(Canada)	Stefan Cebara	1	0	1	0
17	MF	(Canada)	Brett Levis	1	0	1	0
21	MF	(Spain)	José Galán	2	0	2	0
27	MF	(Ghana)	Raphael Ohin	1	0	1	0
33	MF	(Canada)	Fraser Aird	3	0	3	0
48	MF	(Canada)	Dante Campbell	1	0	1	0
Totals				16	0	16	0

Updated to match played September 7, 2020
Source: Canadian Premier League
