= 2019 Valour FC season =

Valour FC
2019 season
- President: Wade Miller
- Head coach: Rob Gale
- Stadium: IG Field
- Canadian Premier League: Spring: 7th Fall: 5th Overall: 6th
- Canadian Championship: Second qualifying round
- Top goalscorer: League: Marco Bustos (7 goals); All: Marco Bustos (8 goals)
- Highest home attendance: 9,699 (May 4 vs. FC Edmonton)
- Lowest home attendance: 3,586 (September 12 vs. Forge FC)
- Average home league attendance: League: 5,438; All: 5,367
Home colours	Away colours

The 2019 Valour FC season was the first season in the club's history, as well as the first season in Canadian Premier League history.

== Current squad ==
As of October 16, 2019.

No.	Name	Nationality	Position(s)	Date of birth (age)	Previous club
Goalkeepers
1	Tyson Farago	(Canada)	GK	May 1, 1991 (aged 28)	(Canada) WSA Winnipeg
26	Mathias Janssens	(Belgium)	GK	March 9, 1998 (aged 21)	(Belgium) La Louvière
30	Svyatik Artemenko	(Canada)	GK	February 11, 2000 (aged 19)	(Canada) WSA Winnipeg
Defenders
2	Raphaël Garcia	(Canada)	RB	June 5, 1999 (aged 20)	(Canada) Montreal Impact Academy
3	Skylar Thomas	(Canada)	CB	July 27, 1993 (aged 26)	(United States) Charleston Battery
4	Jordan Murrell	(Canada)	CB / LB	May 2, 1993 (aged 26)	(United States) Reno 1868
6	Martín Arguiñarena	(Uruguay)	LB	September 6, 1991 (aged 28)	(Uruguay) Boston River
15	Adam Mitter	(England)	CB	January 5, 1993 (aged 26)	(Philippines) Global Cebu
25	Yohan Le Bourhis	(Canada)	CB	March 9, 2000 (aged 19)	(Canada) A.S. Blainville
Midfielders
5	Louis Béland-Goyette	(Canada)	DM / CM	September 15, 1995 (aged 24)	(Canada) Montreal Impact
8	Diego Gutiérrez	(Canada)	RM / RB	February 18, 1997 (aged 22)	(Chile) Palestino
9	Michael Petrasso	(Canada)	LW / RW	July 9, 1995 (aged 24)	(Canada) Montreal Impact
10	Dylan Carreiro	(Canada)	MF	January 20, 1995 (aged 24)	(Canada) Woodbridge Strikers
11	Glenn Muenkat	(Canada)	LM	January 3, 1999 (aged 20)	(Germany) 1. FC Kaiserslautern
14	Nicolás Galvis	(Canada)	MF	April 9, 1997 (aged 22)	(Colombia) Deportivo Pereira
20	Josip Golubar	(Croatia)	CM / AM	March 4, 1985 (aged 34)	(Croatia) Varaždin
21	José Galán	(Spain)	CM	February 2, 1986 (aged 33)	(Saudi Arabia) Al-Jabalain
22	Marco Bustos	(Canada)	AM	April 22, 1996 (aged 23)	(United States) Oklahoma City Energy
27	Raphael Ohin	(Ghana)	CM	May 25, 1995 (aged 24)	(Canada) WSA Winnipeg
77	Federico Peña	(Trinidad and Tobago)	MF	March 30, 1999 (aged 20)	(Belgium) Standard Liège
Forwards
16	Tyler Attardo	(Canada)	ST	September 10, 2001 (aged 18)	(Canada) FC Northwest
17	Michele Paolucci	(Italy)	ST	February 6, 1986 (aged 33)	(Malta) Tarxien Rainbows
23	Ali Musse	(Canada)	ST / AM	January 1, 1996 (aged 23)	(Canada) Calgary Foothills

== Transfers ==
=== In ===
==== Transferred in ====
No.	Pos.	Player	Transferred from	Fee/notes	Date	Source
3	DF	(Canada) Skylar Thomas	(United States) Charleston Battery	Free Transfer	November 29, 2018	
17	FW	(England) Stephen Hoyle	(New Zealand) Canterbury United	Free Transfer	December 11, 2018	
1	GK	(Canada) Tyson Farago	(Canada) WSA Winnipeg	Free Transfer	December 14, 2018	
7	MF	(Canada) Dylan Sacramento	(Canada) Vaughan Azzurri	Free Transfer	December 14, 2018	
4	DF	(Canada) Jordan Murrell	(United States) Reno 1868	Free Transfer	January 8, 2019	
11	MF	(Canada) Glenn Muenkat	(Germany) 1. FC Kaiserslautern	Free Transfer	January 8, 2019	
2	DF	(Canada) Raphaël Garcia	(Canada) Montreal Impact Academy	Free Transfer	January 10, 2019	
27	MF	(Ghana) Raphael Ohin	(Canada) WSA Winnipeg	Free Transfer	January 10, 2019	
10	MF	(Canada) Dylan Carreiro	(Canada) Woodbridge Strikers	Selected 2nd overall in the 2018 CPL–U Sports Draft	January 28, 2019	
16	FW	(Canada) Tyler Attardo	(Canada) FC Northwest	Free Transfer	January 28, 2019	
26	GK	(Belgium) Mathias Janssens	(Belgium) La Louvière	Free Transfer	January 31, 2019	
20	MF	(Croatia) Josip Golubar	(Croatia) Varaždin	Free Transfer	February 14, 2019	
6	DF	(Uruguay) Martín Arguiñarena	(Uruguay) Boston River	Free Transfer	February 25, 2019	
14	MF	(Canada) Nicolás Galvis	(Colombia) Deportivo Pereira	Free Transfer	February 26, 2019	
15	MF	(Colombia) Néstor Navia	(Colombia) Deportivo Pasto	Free Transfer	February 26, 2019	
23	FW	(Canada) Ali Musse	(Canada) Calgary Foothills	Free Transfer	February 28, 2019	
8	MF	(Canada) Diego Gutiérrez	(Chile) Palestino	Free Transfer	March 4, 2019	
9	MF	(Canada) Michael Petrasso	(Canada) Montreal Impact	Free Transfer	March 18, 2019	
12	FW	(Canada) Calum Ferguson	(Scotland) Elgin City	Free Transfer	April 3, 2019	
77	MF	(Trinidad and Tobago) Federico Peña	(Belgium) Standard Liège	Free Transfer	April 3, 2019	
5	MF	(Canada) Louis Béland-Goyette	(Canada) Montreal Impact	Free Transfer	April 9, 2019	
15	DF	(England) Adam Mitter	(Philippines) Global Cebu	Free Transfer	April 12, 2019	
22	MF	(Canada) Marco Bustos	(United States) Oklahoma City Energy	Free Transfer	May 7, 2019	
21	MF	(Spain) José Galán	(Saudi Arabia) Al-Jabalain	Free Transfer	July 15, 2019	
17	FW	(Italy) Michele Paolucci	(Malta) Tarxien Rainbows	Free Transfer	July 16, 2019	
25	DF	(Canada) Yohan Le Bourhis	(Canada) A.S. Blainville	Free Transfer	August 9, 2019	

==== Loaned in ====
No.	Pos.	Player	Transferred from	Fee/notes	Date	Source
30	GK	(Canada) Svyatik Artemenko	(Canada) WSA Winnipeg	Emergency Call-up	July 17, 2019	

==== Draft picks ====
Valour FC selected the following players in the 2018 CPL–U Sports Draft on November 12, 2018. Draft picks are not automatically signed to the team roster. Only those who are signed to a contract will be listed as transfers in.

Round	Selection	Pos.	Player	Nationality	University
1	2	MF	Dylan Carreiro	Canada	York Lions
2	13	DF	Lewis White	Scotland	CBU Capers
3	16	MF	Jack Simpson	England	CBU Capers

=== Out ===
==== Transferred out ====
No.	Pos.	Player	Transferred to	Fee/notes	Date	Source
15	MF	(Colombia) Néstor Navia		Left the club for personal reasons	April 3, 2019	
17	FW	(England) Stephen Hoyle	(New Zealand) Eastern Suburbs	Released	July 9, 2019	
12	FW	(Canada) Calum Ferguson	(New Zealand) Canterbury United	Released	October 7, 2019	

==== Loan out ====
No.	Pos.	Player	Transferred from	Fee/notes	Date	Source
7	MF	(Canada) Dylan Sacramento	(New Zealand) Hawke's Bay United	Loan	October 7, 2019	

== Competitions ==
Match times are Central Daylight Time (UTC−5).

=== Canadian Premier League ===
==== Spring season ====
===== League table =====
Pos	Team	Pld	W	D	L	GF	GA	GD	Pts	Qualification
1	Cavalry	10	8	0	2	16	7	+9	24	2019 Canadian Premier League Finals
2	Forge	10	6	1	3	15	7	+8	19	2019 CONCACAF League preliminary round (Note: As winner of home and away matches between FC Edmonton, Forge FC, and Valour FC)
3	FC Edmonton	10	4	2	4	8	9	−1	14	
4	HFX Wanderers	10	3	2	5	8	11	−3	11	
5	Pacific	10	3	2	5	11	15	−4	11	
6	York9	10	2	5	3	9	11	−2	11	
7	Valour	10	3	0	7	8	15	−7	9	

Source: CanPL.ca
Rules for classification: 1) points; 2) total wins; 3) goal differential; 4) goals for; 5) away goal differential; 6) away goals for; 7) home goal differential; 8) home goals for; 9) coin toss or drawing of lots.

===== 2019 CONCACAF League qualification table =====
Pos	Team	Pld	W	D	L	GF	GA	GD	Pts	Qualification	FOR	FCE	VAL
1	Forge FC	4	3	0	1	6	2	+4	9	2019 CONCACAF League	—	2–0	2–1
2	FC Edmonton	4	2	0	2	3	4	−1	6		1–0	—	0–1
3	Valour FC	4	1	0	3	3	6	−3	3		0–2	1–2	—

Source: CanPL.ca
Rules for classification: 1) points; 2) total wins; 3) goal differential; 4) goals for; 5) away goal differential; 6) away goals for; 7) home goal differential; 8) home goals for; 9) coin toss or drawing of lots.

===== Results summary =====
Overall								Home						Away					
Pld	W	D	L	GF	GA	GD	Pts	W	D	L	GF	GA	GD	W	D	L	GF	GA	GD
10	3	0	7	8	15	−7	9	1	0	4	4	9	−5	2	0	3	4	6	−2

Last updated: July 1, 2019.
Source: canpl.ca

===== Results by match =====
Match	1	2	3	4	5	6	7	8	9	10
Ground	A	H	A	H	H	A	A	H	A	H
Result	W	L	L	W	L	W	L	L	L	L
Position	1	3	5	2	3	3	3	3	5	7

Updated to match(es) played on July 1, 2019. Source: #Matches
A = Away; H = Home; W = Win; D = Draw; L = Loss

===== Matches =====
May 1 1	Pacific FC	1–2	Valour FC	Langford, British Columbia
10:00 pm	Baldisimo (yellow card) 32'; Hernández 45'	Report	Hoyle 23'; Béland-Goyette (yellow card) 24'; Gutiérrez (yellow card) 32'; Murrell (yellow card) 53'; Carreiro 78'	Stadium: Westhills Stadium; Attendance: 2,360; Referee: Juan Marquez

May 4 2 CONCACAF series	Valour FC	1–2	FC Edmonton	Winnipeg, Manitoba
5:00 pm	Gutiérrez (yellow card) 71'; Petrasso 86' (pen.)	Report	Temguia 45+1'; Diouck 76'	Stadium: Investors Group Field; Attendance: 9,699; Referee: Pierre-Luc Lauziere

May 8 3	Cavalry FC	1–0	Valour FC	Foothills County, Alberta
8:00 pm	Büscher (yellow card) 51'; Dean Northover (yellow card) 78'; Adekugbe (yellow card) 82'; Escalante 86'	Report	Murrell (yellow card) 39'; Thomas (yellow card) 53'; Béland-Goyette (yellow card) 69'	Stadium: Spruce Meadows; Attendance: 2,055; Referee: Fabrizio Stasolla

May 11 4	Valour FC	1–0	HFX Wanderers FC	Winnipeg, Manitoba
2:30 pm	Ferguson 48'; Garcia (yellow card) 80'; Janssens (yellow card) 86'	Report	Bona (yellow card) 88'	Stadium: IG Field; Attendance: 5,819; Referee: David Barrie

May 16 5 CONCACAF series	Valour FC	0–2	Forge FC	Winnipeg, Manitoba
7:00 pm	Garcia (yellow card) 18'	Report	Novak 8'; Zajac (yellow card) 31'; Borges 69'; Thomas (yellow card) 89'	Stadium: IG Field; Attendance: 4,731; Referee: Silviu Petrescu

June 2 6 CONCACAF series	FC Edmonton	0–1	Valour FC	Edmonton, Alberta
11:30 am	Ameobi (yellow card) 16'	Report	Galvis (yellow card) 8'; Thomas (yellow card) 16'; Musse 80'	Stadium: Clarke Stadium; Attendance: 3,762; Referee: Yusri Rudolf
Note: Originally scheduled for June 1, but postponed due to the Alberta wildfire.

June 15 7 CONCACAF series	Forge FC	2–1	Valour FC	Hamilton, Ontario
4:00 pm	Samuel (yellow card) 31'; Bekker (yellow card) 76'; Kotsopoulos 84'; Murrell 90' (o.g.)	Report	Bustos 1'; Béland-Goyette (yellow card) 53'; Ohin (yellow card) 64'	Stadium: Tim Hortons Field; Attendance: 7,152; Referee: Alain Ruch

June 20 8	Valour FC	1–2	Pacific FC	Winnipeg, Manitoba
7:00 pm	Attardo 45+4'; Béland-Goyette (yellow card) 80'	Report	Blasco (yellow card) 21' (goal) 37'; Campbell 67'; Verhoeven (yellow card) 69'; Hojabrpour (yellow card) 84'	Stadium: IG Field; Attendance: 6,117; Referee: Pierre-Luc Lauziere

June 26 9	HFX Wanderers FC	2–0	Valour FC	Halifax, Nova Scotia
5:00 pm	Kourouma 44' (pen.); Skublak (yellow card) 65'; Schaale (yellow card) 84'; Garcia 85' (yellow card) 90+5'	Report	Ohin (yellow card) 65'	Stadium: Wanderers Grounds; Attendance: 5,834; Referee: David Barrie

July 1 10	Valour FC	1–3	York9 FC	Winnipeg, Manitoba
12:00 pm	Attardo 1'	Report	Doner 7'; Aparicio 57'; Adjei 90+5'	Stadium: IG Field; Attendance: 6,678; Referee: Yusri Rudolf

==== Fall season ====
===== League table =====
Pos	Team	Pld	W	D	L	GF	GA	GD	Pts	Qualification
1	Cavalry	18	11	5	2	35	12	+23	38	2019 Canadian Premier League Finals
2	Forge	18	11	4	3	30	19	+11	37	
3	York9	18	7	2	9	30	26	+4	23	
4	Pacific	18	5	5	8	24	31	−7	20	
5	Valour	18	5	4	9	22	37	−15	19	
6	FC Edmonton	18	4	6	8	19	24	−5	18	
7	HFX Wanderers	18	3	8	7	13	24	−11	17	

Source: CanPL.ca
Rules for classification: 1) points; 2) total wins; 3) goal differential; 4) goals for; 5) away goal differential; 6) away goals for; 7) home goal differential; 8) home goals for; 9) coin toss or drawing of lots.

===== Results summary =====
Overall								Home						Away					
Pld	W	D	L	GF	GA	GD	Pts	W	D	L	GF	GA	GD	W	D	L	GF	GA	GD
18	5	4	9	22	37	−15	19	3	2	4	13	23	−10	2	2	5	9	14	−5

Last updated: October 19, 2019.
Source: canpl.ca

===== Results by round =====
Round	1	2	3	4	5	6	7	8	9	10	11	12	13	14	15	16	17	18
Ground	A	A	H	H	A	A	H	H	A	H	H	H	A	A	A	H	H	A
Result	D	L	D	D	L	W	L	W	L	W	L	L	W	D	L	W	L	L
Position	6	7	7	6	7	6	7	5	6	4	4	6	4	4	5	3	4	5

Updated to match(es) played on October 19, 2019. Source: #Matches
A = Away; H = Home; W = Win; D = Draw; L = Loss

===== Matches =====
July 17 1	FC Edmonton	0–0	Valour FC	Edmonton, Alberta
8:00 pm	Diouck (yellow card) 51'; Ongaro (yellow card) 81'	Report	Ohin (yellow card) 43'	Stadium: Clarke Stadium; Attendance: 2,890; Referee: Pierre-Luc Lauzière
Note: Game was delayed 50-minutes due to a thunderstorm.

July 20 2	Forge FC	3–1	Valour FC	Hamilton, Ontario
2:30 pm	Frano (yellow card) 16'; Cissé 32'; Welshman 37' (pen.); Awuah (yellow card) 55'; Thomas (yellow card) 90+4' (goal) 90+4'	Report	Attardo 49'	Stadium: Tim Hortons Field; Attendance: 5,446; Referee: Scott Bowman

July 27 3	Valour FC	1–1	Cavalry FC	Winnipeg, Manitoba
12:00 pm	Thomas (yellow card) 45+1'; Paolucci (yellow card) 84'; Ohin (yellow card) 90+1'; Bustos 90+3' (pen.)	Report	Oliver 42'; Mavila (yellow card) 90+3'	Stadium: IG Field; Attendance: 5,111; Referee: Fabrizio Stasolla

July 31 4	Valour FC	2–2	Pacific FC	Winnipeg, Manitoba
7:00 pm	Paolucci 4'; Béland-Goyette (yellow card) 23'; Murrell (yellow card) 67'; Galán (yellow card) 70'; Mitter (yellow card) 87'; Petrasso 90+1' (pen.)	Report	Fisk 25'; MacNaughton 43' (yellow card) 90'; Smith (yellow card) 47'; Verhoeven (yellow card) 89'	Stadium: IG Field; Attendance: 5,411; Referee: Mathieu Souaré

August 5 5	HFX Wanderers FC	1–0	Valour FC	Halifax, Nova Scotia
2:30 pm	Skublak (yellow card) 41'; Arnone 58'	Report	Arguiñarena (yellow card) 82'; Murrell (red card) 90'; Gutiérrez (yellow card) 90+2'	Stadium: Wanderers Grounds; Attendance: 6,115; Referee: Filip Dujic

August 10 6	York9 FC	0–2	Valour FC	Toronto, Ontario
2:30 pm	Zambazis (yellow card) 60'	Report	Paolucci 7'; Mitter (yellow card) 66'; Galán (yellow card) 82'; Petrasso 90+4'	Stadium: York Lions Stadium; Attendance: 2,438; Referee: David Barrie

August 17 7	Valour FC	1–3	Forge FC	Winnipeg, Manitoba
5:00 pm	Petrasso 76' (pen.)	Report	Novak 30', 73'; Frano (yellow card) 51'; Grant (yellow card) 75'; Nanco 77'	Stadium: IG Field; Attendance: 4,944; Referee: Fabrizio Stasolla

August 19 8	Valour FC	3–1	FC Edmonton	Winnipeg, Manitoba
7:00 pm	Petrasso 52' (pen.); Béland-Goyette 69'; Bustos 81' (yellow card) 82'; Janssens (yellow card) 86'; Ohin (yellow card) 90+2'	Report	Ongaro 30'; Soria (yellow card) 35'	Stadium: IG Field; Attendance: 6,379; Referee: Alain Ruch

August 24 9	Pacific FC	2–1	Valour FC	Langford, British Columbia
5:00 pm	Hojabrpour (yellow card) 23'; Starostzik (yellow card) 53'; Haber 61', 81' (pen.); Baldisimo (yellow card) 89' (yellow-red card) 90'	Report	Thomas (yellow card) 52'; Petrasso 59'; Ohin (yellow card) 78'	Stadium: Westhills Stadium; Attendance: 4,381; Referee: Pierre-Luc Lauzière

August 28 10	Valour FC	2–0	HFX Wanderers FC	Winnipeg, Manitoba
7:00 pm	Mitter (yellow card) 45+1'; Bustos 47', 50' (yellow card) 77'	Report	Ouattara (yellow card) 28'	Stadium: IG Field; Attendance: 4,346; Referee: Yusri Rudolf

September 2 11	Valour FC	0–8	Cavalry FC	Winnipeg, Manitoba
2:30 pm	Galán (yellow card) 48'; Ohin (yellow card) 58'; Mitter (yellow card) 78'; Carreiro (yellow card) 90'	report	Ledgerwood 13' (pen.); Brown (yellow card) 18' (goal) 88'; Pasquotti 39'; Mitter 42' (o.g.); Büscher 52', 79'; Oliver 60', 87'	Stadium: IG Field; Attendance: 4,566; Referee: Fabrizio Stasolla

September 12 12	Valour FC	1–3	Forge FC	Winnipeg, Manitoba
7:00 pm	Bustos (yellow card) 19'; Mitter (red card) 26'; Carreiro (yellow card) 33'; Attardo 70'	Report	Novak 15'; Nanco 16'; Borges 27' (pen.); Frano (yellow card) 37'	Stadium: IG Field; Attendance: 3,586; Referee: Serge Topalian

September 15 13	York9 FC	2–4	Valour FC	Toronto, Ontario
2:30 pm	Rodrigo Gattas 7', 59'; Telfer (yellow card) 90'	Report	Attardo 18', 55'; Sacramento 20'; Galán (yellow card) 43'; Musse 65'; Carreiro (yellow card) 75'	Stadium: York Lions Stadium; Attendance: 3,863; Referee: Marie-Soleil Beaudoin

September 21 14	HFX Wanderers FC	0–0	Valour FC	Halifax, Nova Scotia
12:00 pm	Rampersad (yellow card) 71'	Report	Ohin (yellow card) 44'; Murrell (yellow card) 90+1'	Stadium: Wanderers Grounds; Attendance: 6,138; Referee: Yusri Rudolf

October 2 15	Cavalry FC	4–1	Valour FC	Foothills County, Alberta
8:00 pm	Malonga 53', 87'; Waterman (yellow card) 62'; Ledgerwood (yellow card) 74'; Oliver 85'; Büscher 90+1'	Report	Ohin (yellow card) 28'; Bustos 77'	Stadium: ATCO Field; Attendance: 2,570; Referee: Alain Ruch

October 5 16	Valour FC	3–1	FC Edmonton	Winnipeg, Manitoba
2:30 pm	Carreiro 12'; Paolucci 40' (yellow card) 88'; Bustos 72' (pen.); Peña (yellow card) 90+2'	Report	Ongaro 56'	Stadium: IG Field; Attendance: 4,776; Referee: Juan Marquez

October 16 17	Valour FC	0–4	York9 FC	Winnipeg, Manitoba
7:00 pm	Thomas (yellow card) 53'	Report	Thompson (yellow card) 9'; Telfer 48', 83'; Di Chiara 54' (pen.); Abzi (yellow card) 58'; Furlano (yellow card) 78'; Adjei 89'	Stadium: IG Field; Attendance: 3,980; Referee: Sebastian Noshinravani

October 19 18	Pacific FC	2–0	Valour FC	Langford, British Columbia
5:30 pm	Verhoven 12'; Norman Jr. (yellow card) 42'; Fisk 61'; Nakajima-Farran (yellow card) 90+2'	Report	Galán (yellow card) 36'; Gutiérrez (yellow card) 73'	Stadium: Westhills Stadium; Attendance: 5,103; Referee: Filip Dujic

=== Canadian Championship ===
June 5 Second qualifying round	HFX Wanderers FC	2–1	Valour FC	Halifax, Nova Scotia
4:15 pm	Rampersad (yellow card) 26'; Skublak 39', (yellow card) 50'; Kourouma 41'; Bona (yellow card) 71'	Report	Bustos 33', (yellow card) 71'; Galvis (yellow card) 41'	Stadium: Wanderers Grounds; Attendance: 3,854; Referee: Juan Marquez

June 12 Second qualifying round	Valour FC	0–2 (1–4 agg.)	HFX Wanderers FC	Winnipeg, Manitoba
7:30 pm	Ohin (yellow card) 81'	Report	Kourouma 58'; Bona 90+3'	Stadium: IG Field; Attendance: 4,373; Referee: Yusri Rudolf

== Statistics ==
=== Squad and statistics ===
As of October 19, 2019

No.	Pos	Nat	Player	Total		CPL Spring season		CPL Fall season		Canadian Championship	
No.	Pos	Nat	Player	Apps	Goals	Apps	Goals	Apps	Goals	Apps	Goals
1	GK	(Canada) CAN	Tyson Farago	17	0	6+0	0	10+0	0	1+0	0
2	DF	(Canada) CAN	Raphaël Garcia	16	0	3+1	0	7+5	0	0+0	0
3	DF	(Canada) CAN	Skylar Thomas	23	0	8+0	0	13+1	0	1+0	0
4	DF	(Canada) CAN	Jordan Murrell	22	0	10+0	0	10+0	0	2+0	0
5	MF	(Canada) CAN	Louis Béland-Goyette	23	1	10+0	0	11+0	1	2+0	0
6	DF	(Uruguay) URU	Martín Arguiñarena	20	0	9+1	0	8+0	0	2+0	0
8	MF	(Canada) CAN	Diego Gutiérrez	24	0	7+1	0	11+4	0	1+0	0
9	MF	(Canada) CAN	Michael Petrasso	20	6	4+0	1	11+3	5	2+0	0
10	MF	(Canada) CAN	Dylan Carreiro	24	2	5+3	1	10+5	1	1+0	0
11	MF	(Canada) CAN	Glenn Muenkat	14	0	2+2	0	0+9	0	0+1	0
14	MF	(Canada) CAN	Nicolás Galvis	12	0	3+2	0	4+2	0	1+0	0
15	DF	(England) ENG	Adam Mitter	21	0	6+1	0	13+0	0	1+0	0
16	FW	(Canada) CAN	Tyler Attardo	22	6	3+2	2	7+8	4	0+2	0
17	FW	(Italy) ITA	Michele Paolucci	15	3	0+0	0	13+2	3	0+0	0
20	MF	(Croatia) CRO	Josip Golubar	3	0	3+0	0	0+0	0	0+0	0
21	MF	(Spain) ESP	José Galán	13	0	0+0	0	11+2	0	0+0	0
22	MF	(Canada) CAN	Marco Bustos	27	8	7+0	1	18+0	6	2+0	1
23	FW	(Canada) CAN	Ali Musse	15	2	4+3	1	4+2	1	1+1	0
25	DF	(Canada) CAN	Yohan Le Bourhis	8	0	0+0	0	8+0	0	0+0	0
26	GK	(Belgium) BEL	Mathias Janssens	13	0	4+0	0	8+0	0	1+0	0
27	MF	(Ghana) GHA	Raphael Ohin	22	0	4+1	0	12+3	0	1+1	0
77	MF	(Trinidad and Tobago) TTO	Federico Peña	8	0	1+3	0	2+2	0	0+0	0
Players who left during the season:
7	MF	(Canada) CAN	Dylan Sacramento	20	1	6+3	0	6+3	1	1+1	0
12	FW	(Canada) CAN	Calum Ferguson	9	1	3+3	1	1+1	0	1+0	0
17	FW	(England) ENG	Stephen Hoyle	7	1	2+4	1	0+0	0	1+0	0

=== Top scorers ===
Rank	Nat.	Player	Pos.	CPL Spring season	CPL Fall season	Canadian Championship	TOTAL
1	(Canada)	Marco Bustos	MF	1	6	1	8
2	(Canada)	Tyler Attardo	FW	2	4	0	6
2	(Canada)	Michael Petrasso	MF	1	5	0	6
4	(Italy)	Michele Paolucci	FW	0	3	0	3
5	(Canada)	Dylan Carreiro	MF	1	1	0	2
5	(Canada)	Ali Musse	FW	1	1	0	2
7	(Canada)	Louis Béland-Goyette	MF	0	1	0	1
7	(Canada)	Calum Ferguson	FW	1	0	0	1
7	(England)	Stephen Hoyle	FW	1	0	0	1
7	(Canada)	Dylan Sacramento	MF	0	1	0	1
Totals				8	22	1	31

Updated to match played October 19, 2019
Source: Canadian Premier League

=== Top assists ===
Rank	Nat.	Player	Pos.	CPL Spring season	CPL Fall season	Canadian Championship	TOTAL
1	(Canada)	Michael Petrasso	MF	2	3	0	5
2	(Canada)	Louis Béland-Goyette	MF	1	2	0	3
2	(Canada)	Dylan Carreiro	MF	0	3	0	3
4	(Canada)	Marco Bustos	MF	0	2	0	2
4	(Canada)	Raphaël Garcia	DF	0	2	0	2
4	(Canada)	Ali Musse	FW	1	1	0	2
4	(Italy)	Michele Paolucci	FW	0	2	0	2
4	(Canada)	Dylan Sacramento	MF	1	0	1	2
9	(Uruguay)	Martín Arguiñarena	DF	1	0	0	1
9	(Canada)	Diego Gutiérrez	MF	1	0	0	1
9	(Canada)	Skylar Thomas	DF	0	1	0	1
Totals				7	16	1	24

Updated to match played October 19, 2019
Source: Canadian Premier League

=== Clean sheets ===
Rank	Nat.	Player	CPL Spring season	CPL Fall season	Canadian Championship	TOTAL
1	(Belgium)	Mathias Janssens	2	2	0	4
2	(Canada)	Tyson Farago	0	2	0	2
Totals			2	4	0	6

Updated to match played October 19, 2019
Source: Canadian Premier League

=== Disciplinary record ===
No.	Pos.	Nat.	Player	CPL Spring season		CPL Fall season		Canadian Championship		TOTAL	
No.	Pos.	Nat.	Player	Yellow card	Red card	Yellow card	Red card	Yellow card	Red card	Yellow card	Red card
2	DF	(Canada)	Raphaël Garcia	2	0	0	0	0	0	2	0
3	DF	(Canada)	Skylar Thomas	2	0	3	0	0	0	5	0
4	DF	(Canada)	Jordan Murrell	2	0	2	1	0	0	4	1
5	MF	(Canada)	Louis Béland-Goyette	4	0	1	0	0	0	5	0
6	DF	(Uruguay)	Martín Arguiñarena	0	0	1	0	0	0	1	0
8	MF	(Canada)	Diego Gutiérrez	2	0	2	0	0	0	4	0
10	MF	(Canada)	Dylan Carreiro	0	0	3	0	0	0	3	0
14	MF	(Canada)	Nicolás Galvis	1	0	0	0	1	0	2	0
15	DF	(England)	Adam Mitter	0	0	4	1	0	0	4	1
17	FW	(Italy)	Michele Paolucci	0	0	2	0	0	0	2	0
21	MF	(Spain)	José Galán	0	0	5	0	0	0	5	0
22	MF	(Canada)	Marco Bustos	0	0	3	0	1	0	4	0
26	GK	(Belgium)	Mathias Janssens	1	0	1	0	0	0	2	0
27	MF	(Ghana)	Raphael Ohin	2	0	7	0	1	0	10	0
77	MF	(Trinidad and Tobago)	Federico Peña	0	0	1	0	0	0	1	0
Totals				16	0	35	2	3	0	54	2

Updated to match played October 19, 2019
Source: Canadian Premier League
