= Raphael Ohin =

Ghanaian professional footballer (born 1995)

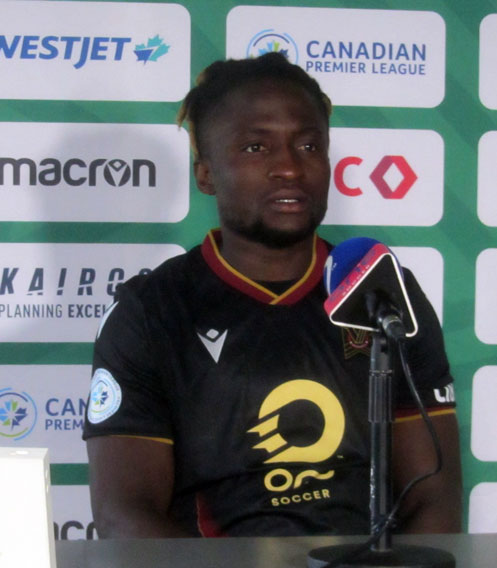
- Ohin in 2023

Personal information
- Date of birth: 25 May 1995 (age 31)
- Place of birth: Accra, Ghana
- Height: 1.70 m (5 ft 7 in)
- Position: Midfielder

Senior career*
Years	Team	Apps	(Gls)
2016–2018	WSA Winnipeg	25	(5)
2019–2025	Valour FC	101	(2)
2026	Treaty United	15	(0)
- * Club domestic league appearances and goals as of July 26, 2026

Raphael Ohin (born 25 May 1995) is a Ghanaian professional footballer.

== Early life ==
Ohin is a native of Accra, Ghana. From 2008 to 2010, he played for an academy team in his native Ghana. When he was 15, he attracted the attention of a scout for Swiss club FC Basel and was invited to a week-long trial with the club. He impressed the club and was working on signing a professional academy contract, but ultimately was unable to. Afterwards, he had a trial with German side Borussia Mönchengladbach, but again after impressing during his trial was unable to sign with the club. Afterwards, he went to trial with a club in Thailand, who kept him for four months, but were not willing to pay him the desired amount his agent was asking for and he returned to Ghana. He then trialled with Swedish club Bodens BK, but did not sign a contract. In 2015, he went to Canada, after initially planning to join Premier Development League club K-W United, he never ended up trialling with the club, instead heading to Vancouver to trial with Whitecaps FC 2, but did not earn a contract and returned to Ghana. In 2016, he moved to Winnipeg, Canada, to live with his aunt.

== Club career ==
From 2016 to 2018, Ohin played with WSA Winnipeg in the Premier Development League. Initially, he was restricted to playing home games only (as well as road games against the Thunder Bay Chill, the only other Canadian team in the division), as he had been unable to secure a visa to be able to travel to the United States, where the majority of the clubs were located.

In January 2019, Ohin signed his first professional contract, joining Canadian Premier League club Valour FC on a multi-year contract. He made his debut on May 11, 2019, in a substitute appearance against HFX Wanderers FC. In October 2020, he re-signed with the club for the 2021 season. On July 3, 2021, he scored his first goal for the club against Atlético Ottawa. He was ranked #34 in the league's top 50 players in 2021. In December 2021, he again re-signed with the club for another season. In March 2022, on the first day of pre-season training camp, Ohin suffered an ACL injury, which caused him to miss the entire 2022 season. In December 2022, he re-signed with the club for the 2023 season. After missing all but two matches through the 2022 and 2023 seasons due to recurring knee injuries, Ohin re-signed with the club for the 2024 season. He was subsequently name team captain ahead of the 2024 season. In December 2024, the club picked up his option for the 2025 season.

In February 2026, he signed with Treaty United in the League of Ireland First Division.

== Personal life ==
Due to his playing style, he has been nicknamed "The Rhino". Ohin is a practicing Christian and credits his faith for his success. In March 2021, he obtained his Canadian permanent residency. Since arriving in Winnipeg, he has collected soccer equipment to distribute to the youth back in his native Ghana.

He served as a youth soccer coach with WSA Winnipeg and the St. Charles Soccer Association, before signing a professional contract with Valour in January 2019.

== Career statistics ==
As of match played March 6, 2026

Club	Season	League			Playoffs		National cup		Continental		Total	
Club	Season	Division	Apps	Goals	Apps	Goals	Apps	Goals	Apps	Goals	Apps	Goals
WSA Winnipeg	2016	Premier Development League	9	1	—		—		—		9	1
WSA Winnipeg	2017	Premier Development League	8	4	—		—		—		8	4
WSA Winnipeg	2018	Premier Development League	8	0	—		—		—		8	0
WSA Winnipeg	Total		25	5	0	0	0	0	0	0	25	5
Valour FC	2019	Canadian Premier League	20	0	—		2	0	—		22	0
Valour FC	2020	Canadian Premier League	7	0	—		—		—		7	0
Valour FC	2021	Canadian Premier League	26	1	—		2	0	—		28	1
Valour FC	2022	Canadian Premier League	0	0	—		0	0	—		0	0
Valour FC	2023	Canadian Premier League	1	0	—		1	0	—		2	0
Valour FC	2024	Canadian Premier League	21	1	—		0	0	—		21	1
Valour FC	2025	Canadian Premier League	26	0	—		2	0	—		28	0
Valour FC	Total		101	2	0	0	7	0	0	0	108	2
Treaty United	2026	League of Ireland First Division	4	0	—		0	0	—		4	0
Career total			130	7	0	0	7	0	0	0	137	7
