= Michael Petrasso =

Canadian soccer player (born 1995)

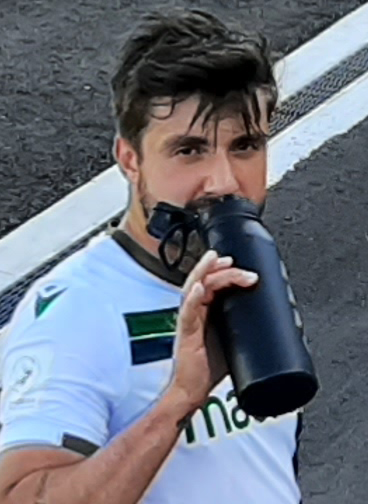
- Petrasso with York United in 2021

Personal information
- Full name: Michael Alexander Petrasso
- Date of birth: 9 July 1995 (age 31)
- Place of birth: Toronto, Canada
- Height: 1.68 m (5 ft 6 in)
- Position: Winger

Youth career
- Kleinburg Nobleton
- 2010–2012: Toronto FC
- 2012–2013: Queens Park Rangers

Senior career*
Years	Team	Apps	(Gls)
2013–2018	Queens Park Rangers	11	(0)
2013–2014	→ Oldham Athletic (loan)	11	(1)
2014	→ Coventry City (loan)	7	(1)
2014	→ Leyton Orient (loan)	3	(0)
2014–2015	→ Notts County (loan)	8	(3)
2018	Montreal Impact	14	(0)
2018	→ Ottawa Fury (loan)	0	(0)
2019	Valour FC	18	(6)
2020–2023	York United	51	(2)
2020–2021	→ Barnet (loan)	28	(8)
2023	→ Maidstone United (loan)	11	(0)

International career
2010–2011	Canada U17	8	(3)
2012–2015	Canada U20	6	(1)
2015–2017	Canada U23	7	(4)
2016–2018	Canada	9	(0)
- * Club domestic league appearances and goals

Michael Alexander Petrasso (born 9 July 1995) is a Canadian former professional soccer player who played as a winger.

== Early life ==
Petrasso was born in Toronto, and grew up in Woodbridge, just north of Toronto. He started playing youth football at the age of three for local junior club Kleinburg Nobleton SC. He joined TFC Academy, the youth setup of Major League Soccer side Toronto FC at the age of fifteen. His younger brother Luca plays for MLS club CF Montréal.

== Club career ==
=== Toronto FC ===
Petrasso began his career at Canadian club Toronto FC, where he played at youth level as a part of the TFC Academy. In 2012, he departed from the club, along with teammates Keven Alemán and Dylan Carreiro, after falling out of favour with the academy, while under manager Aron Winter. Petrasso and Carreiro trained with Canadian Soccer League club SC Toronto after their exit from Toronto FC, shortly before both moving to English Premier League side Queens Park Rangers.

=== Queens Park Rangers ===
In his first season at QPR, Petrasso was an integral member of the squad that won the Professional Development League 2 at under-18 level, while also making several appearances for the under-21 side in the same season.

After continuing his good form into the 2013–14 season with the under-21 squad, Petrasso was rewarded with a loan move to League One side Oldham Athletic on 22 November 2013. He made his senior début the following day in a league match against Gillingham, in which he started the match and scored the sole goal of the game. Petrasso's two–month loan with Oldham Athletic ended on 18 January 2014, returning to Loftus Road after some excellent performances, appearing 15 times and scoring one goal, which was on his debut for the club.

On 14 February 2014, Petrasso joined League One side Coventry City on an initial 28-day loan. He scored his first goal for the club in a 3–1 defeat to Tranmere Rovers. On 13 March 2014, Petrasso extended his loan stay with the Sky Blues until 16 March 2014 to cover the match scheduled against Port Vale, with a view to extending the loan further until the end of the 2013–14 season. At the end of his loan spell, Petrasso had made 7 appearances, scoring 1 goal.

On 7 April 2014, Petrasso signed a new three-year contract with QPR. He made his Queens Park Rangers first team debut on 3 May 2014, in a 3–2 final game of the season win against Barnsley, replacing Yossi Benayoun as a substitute in the 76th minute.

After failing to make QPR's 25-man squad in the Premier League for the 2014–15 season, Petrasso was loaned out to gain further experience at Leyton Orient on 11 September 2014 on a one-month loan, until 7 October 2014. Petrasso made his debut on 13 September 2014 in a 2–0 defeat at home to Colchester United in which he started, but was however later substituted in the 69th minute by Jobi McAnuff.

Petrasso moved to Notts County on a 93-day emergency day loan on 14 October 2014. He made his debut on 18 October, replacing Zeli Ismail in the 74th minute in a 5–3 victory over Crawley Town. He scored his first goals for Notts County in a 3–2 victory over Barnsley on 21 October.

Since then, Petrasso has continued to show excellent form, scoring his third goal in just five appearances since joining Notts County, as his side fell 2–1 to Yeovil Town in League One on Saturday, 22 November 2014.

Petrasso stayed at Loftus Road going into the 2015–2016 season. He made his full debut with the side on 28 November 2015, starting against Leeds United.

Petrasso picked up a long-term injury in the pre-season of the 2016–2017 season, and after 9 months out injured, Petrasso made his return to the Rangers first team by replacing Darnell Furlong in a 1–0 defeat away to Aston Villa.

On 12 January 2018, Petrasso left QPR alongside teammate Reece Grego-Cox.

=== Montreal Impact ===
On 18 January 2018, Petrasso joined Montreal Impact in MLS. Petrasso made his Impact debut against Vancouver Whitecaps FC during the 2018 season opener.

=== Valour FC ===
On 18 March 2019, Petrasso signed with Canadian Premier League side Valour FC. He made his debut for Valour in their inaugural game on 1 May against Pacific FC. Petrasso scored his first goal for the club in their next game on 5 May against FC Edmonton.

=== York United ===
On 24 January 2020, Petrasso signed with York9 (later renamed York United). He made his debut for York on 18 August against Pacific FC. Despite missing significant time during the Island Games tournament, Petrasso would sign a 2-year extension with York9, keeping him with the club through the 2022 season.

==== Barnet (loan) ====
He joined Barnet in the National League in the English fifth-tier, on a season-long loan on 5 October 2020. He scored twice on his debut in a 3–2 win away at Leiston in the FA Cup on 24 October. He suffered an injury in November, causing him to miss a couple of months of action. He finished his loan on 28 May 2021, scoring ten goals in 31 games.

==== Maidstone United (loan) ====
On 6 September 2023, Petrasso joined National League South club Maidstone United on loan until the end of the year.

== International career ==
Petrasso began his involvement with the Canada national team in 2010, as a member of training camps for both the under-15s and the under-17s. He was named as a member of the under-17 squad to play in the 2011 CONCACAF U-17 Championship, and scored a hat-trick in an 8–0 win against Barbados in the group stage. He has also represented Canada at the U-20 level and was a part of the team that went to the 2013 CONCACAF U-20 Championship.

In October 2013, Petrasso had his first experience with Canada's senior team when he was announced as a member of the senior squad's training camp, ahead of the friendly against Australia. However, he did not see time in the match. In November 2014, Petrasso returned to the U-20s for a series of friendlies. He scored a goal during the first friendly against England in a 2–2 draw. In December 2014, Petrasso was named the Canada Soccer U20 Player of the Year.

Petrasso was named to the 35-man provisional squad for the 2015 CONCACAF Gold Cup by Canada coach Benito Floro on 10 June 2015. On 27 August 2015, Petrasso received a call-up to the Canada senior squad for their two-legged World Cup qualifier against Belize. He made his debut for the senior side in a friendly against Azerbaijan on 3 June 2016. He started the match and played the first 61 minutes of the eventual 1–1 draw.

After appearing for new Canada coach Octavio Zambrano in the Qatar-hosted Aspire tournament with the U23 side in March 2017, Petrasso was named to the 40-man provisional team for the 2017 CONCACAF Gold Cup on 6 June 2017. On 27 June, he was named to the final 23-man squad.

== Personal ==
He is the older brother of CF Montréal player Luca Petrasso.

== Career statistics ==
=== Club ===
As of match played 3 December 2023

Appearances and goals by club, season and competition
Club	Season	League			National Cup (Note: Includes FA Cup, Canadian Championship)		League Cup (Note: Includes League Cup)		Other		Total	
Club	Season	Division	Apps	Goals	Apps	Goals	Apps	Goals	Apps	Goals	Apps	Goals
Queens Park Rangers	2013–14	Championship	1	0	0	0	0	0	0	0	1	0
Queens Park Rangers	2014–15	Premier League	0	0	0	0	0	0	—		0	0
Queens Park Rangers	2015–16	Championship	8	0	1	0	0	0	—		9	0
Queens Park Rangers	2016–17	Championship	2	0	0	0	0	0	—		2	0
Queens Park Rangers	2017–18	Championship	0	0	0	0	1	0	—		1	0
Queens Park Rangers	Total		11	0	1	0	1	0	0	0	13	0
Oldham Athletic (loan)	2013–14	League One	11	1	3	0	0	0	1 (Note: Appearance(s) in Football League Trophy)	0	15	1
Coventry City (loan)	2013–14	League One	7	1	0	0	0	0	0	0	7	1
Leyton Orient (loan)	2014–15	League One	3	0	0	0	1	0	0	0	4	0
Notts County (loan)	2014–15	League One	8	3	2	0	0	0	2	0	12	3
Montreal Impact	2018	Major League Soccer	14	0	2	0	—		—		16	0
Valour FC	2019	Canadian Premier League	18	6	2	0	—		—		20	6
York United FC	2020	Canadian Premier League	3	0	—		—		—		3	0
York United FC	2021	Canadian Premier League	21	2	2	0	—		1 (Note: Appearance in Canadian Premier League play-offs)	1	24	3
York United FC	2022	Canadian Premier League	13	0	0	0	—		—		13	0
York United FC	2023	Canadian Premier League	14	0	0	0	—		0	0	14	0
York United FC	Total		52	2	2	0	—		1	1	55	3
Barnet (loan)	2020–21	National League	28	8	3	2	—		0	0	31	10
Maidstone United (loan)	2023–24	National League South	8	0	2	0	—		0	0	10	0
Career total			160	13	17	2	2	0	4	1	183	16

=== International ===
As of match played 24 March 2018

Canada
Year	Apps	Goals
2016	2	0
2017	6	0
2018	1	0
Total	9	0
