= Christophe Janssens =

Belgian footballer (born 1998)

Personal information
- Full name: Christophe Arnold Janssens
- Date of birth: 9 March 1998 (age 28)
- Place of birth: Verviers, Belgium
- Height: 1.81 m (5 ft 11 in)
- Position: Left back

Team information
- Current team: Beveren
- Number: 4

Youth career
- 2014–2015: Club Brugge
- 2015–2017: Genk

Senior career*
Years	Team	Apps	(Gls)
2017–2018	Genk	2	(0)
2017–2018	→ MVV Maastricht (loan)	22	(1)
2018–2021	Westerlo	38	(1)
2021–2024	Deinze	69	(2)
2024–2025	Francs Borains	13	(0)
2025–	Beveren	29	(0)

International career
2013	Belgium U15	4	(0)
2013–2014	Belgium U16	16	(2)
2014–2015	Belgium U17	24	(1)
2016	Belgium U18	1	(0)
2016–2017	Belgium U19	4	(1)
- * Club domestic league appearances and goals as of 19 April 2026

Christophe Arnold Janssens (born 9 March 1998) is a Belgian professional footballer who plays as a left back for Beveren.

== Club career ==
=== Genk ===
Janssens is a youth product of Genk

On 14 May 2017, Janssens made his debut in the first team as a substitute replacing Sebastien Dewaest in the 84th minute of a 2–0 away win over Royal Excel Mouscron in the UEFA Europa League play-offs in Belgium. On 27 May he played, again, in a UEFA Europa League play-offs match as a substitute replacing Omar Colley in the 85th minute of a 3–0 home win over Sint-Truidense.

==== Loan to MVV Maastricht ====
On 1 July, Janssens was signed by Eerste Divisie side MVV Maastricht. On 18 August he made his debut for Maastricht as a starter, he score his first professional goal in the 28th minute of a 4–3 home win over Go Ahead Eagles. On 19 September he played in the first round of the KNVB Beker in a 3–2 home defeat against AZ Alkmaar.

=== Deinze ===
On 22 June 2021, he joined Deinze on a two-year contract.

=== Francs Borains ===
On 11 December 2024, Janssens joined Francs Borains, after his now former club Deinze went bankrupted.

=== Beveren ===
On 30 May 2025, Janssens signed a two-season contract with Beveren.

== Personal life ==
Janssens' twin brother Mathias is also a footballer and plays for Valour FC in Canada.
