= Arnold Bouka Moutou =

Professional footballer (born 1988)

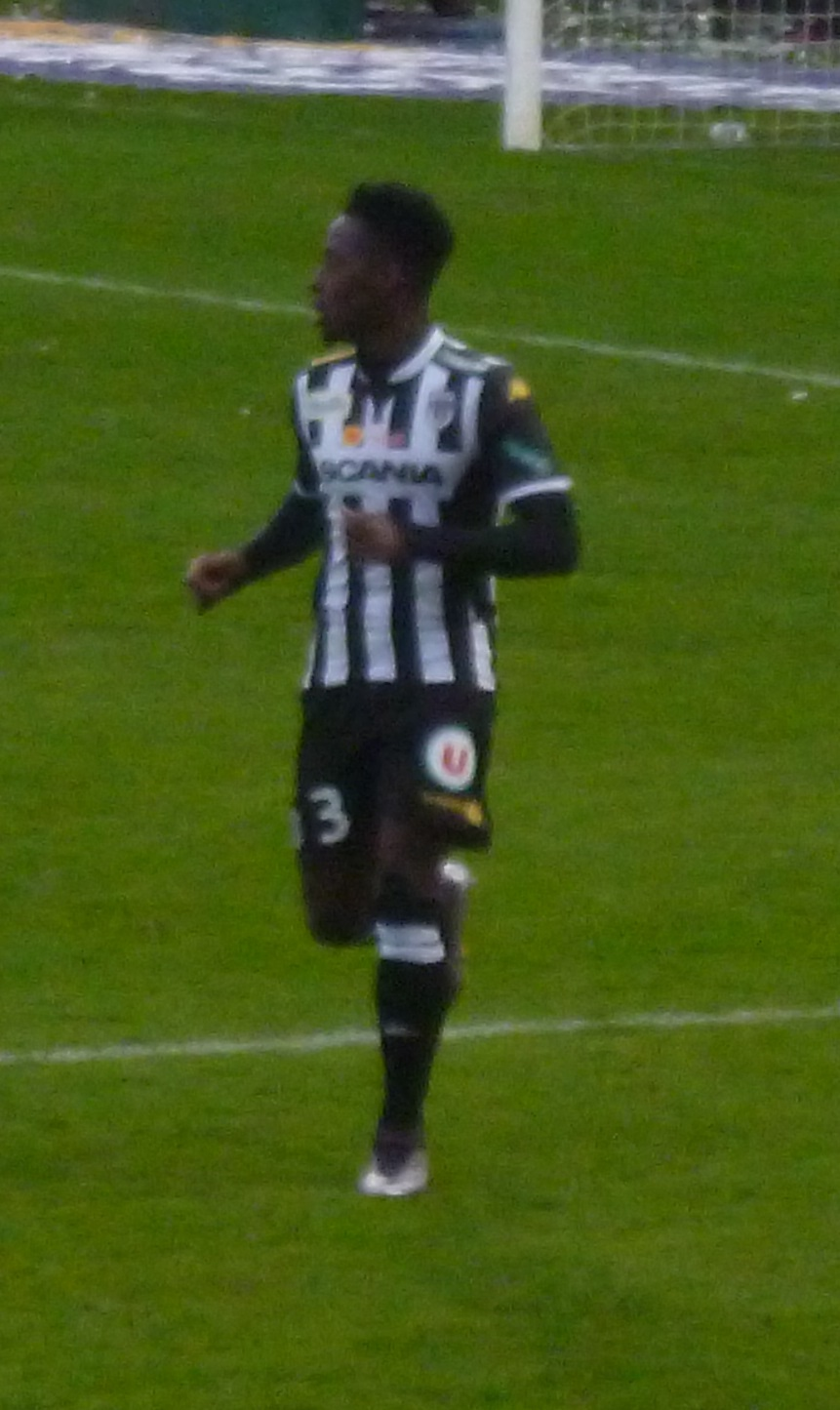
- Bouka Moutou playing for Angers in 2016

Personal information
- Full name: Arnold Bouka Moutou
- Date of birth: 28 November 1988 (age 37)
- Place of birth: Reims, France
- Height: 1.76 m (5 ft 9 in)
- Positions: Left-back; left winger

Senior career*
| Years | Team | Apps | (Gls) |
| 2006–2007 | Épernay | 22 | (0) |
| 2007–2009 | Amiens B | 20 | (1) |
| 2009–2010 | AC Amiens | 20 | (1) |
| 2010–2011 | Calais | 28 | (0) |
| 2011–2012 | AC Amiens | 14 | (0) |
| 2012–2016 | Angers | 93 | (2) |
| 2012–2015 | → Angers B | 21 | (0) |
| 2016–2019 | Dijon | 19 | (0) |
| 2016–2019 | → Dijon B | 13 | (0) |
| 2020–2022 | Valour FC | 16 | (0) |

International career
| 2014–2017 | Congo | 19 | (1) |
- * Club domestic league appearances and goals

Arnold Bouka Moutou (born 28 November 1988) is a former professional footballer who plays as a left-back. Born in France, he represented Congo at the international level.

== Club career ==
=== Dijon ===
In July 2016, Bouka Moutou was transferred to newly promoted Ligue 1 side Dijon for a fee of €400,000. He made his first-team debut on 17 September 2016 in a 0–0 draw against Metz. In the 2016–17 season, he made a total of ten first-team appearances, two appearances in the French Cup and three reserve team appearances in CFA 2.

The following season, Bouka Moutou made six first-team league appearances and one appearance in the Coupe de la Ligue. With the reserve side, he made five appearances. The 2018–19 season saw a further reduction in first-team playing time for Bouka Moutou, as he made only three league appearances and two in the French Cup, while making another five appearances with the reserves. He departed the club at the end of that season after his contract ran out.

=== Valour FC ===
On 28 February 2020, Bouka Moutou signed with Canadian Premier League side Valour FC. He made his debut for Valour on August 16 against Cavalry FC.

== International career ==
He represented the Congo national team at the 2015 Africa Cup of Nations, where his team advanced to the quarterfinals. He scored his only international goal against Egypt on 8 October 2017 (this was a FIFA World Cup qualifying match that resulted in Egypt winning 2–1 and going to the 2018 finals).

== Career statistics ==
=== Club ===
As of 21 January 2020

Club statistics
| Club | Season | League | | | National Cup (Note: Includes appearances in the French Cup.) | | League Cup (Note: Includes appearances in the Coupe de la Ligue.) | | Other | | Total | |
| Club | Season | Division | Apps | Goals | Apps | Goals | Apps | Goals | Apps | Goals | Apps | Goals |
|---|---|---|---|---|---|---|---|---|---|---|---|---|
| Épernay | 2006–07 | CFA | 22 | 0 | ? | ? | — | | 0 | 0 | 22 | 0 |
| Amiens B | 2007–08 | CFA 2 | 20 | 1 | — | | — | | 0 | 0 | 20 | 1 |
| AC Amiens | 2009–10 | CFA 2 | 20 | 1 | ? | ? | — | | 0 | 0 | 20 | 1 |
| Calais | 2010–11 | CFA 2 | 28 | 0 | ? | ? | — | | 0 | 0 | 28 | 0 |
| AC Amiens | 2011–12 | CFA | 14 | 0 | 0 | 0 | — | | 0 | 0 | 14 | 0 |
| Angers | 2011–12 | Ligue 2 | 4 | 0 | 0 | 0 | 0 | 0 | 0 | 0 | 4 | 0 |
| Angers | 2012–13 | Ligue 2 | 7 | 0 | 0 | 0 | 1 | 0 | 0 | 0 | 8 | 0 |
| Angers | 2013–14 | Ligue 2 | 29 | 0 | 5 | 0 | 1 | 0 | 0 | 0 | 35 | 0 |
| Angers | 2014–15 | Ligue 2 | 30 | 0 | 1 | 0 | 1 | 0 | 0 | 0 | 32 | 0 |
| Angers | 2015–16 | Ligue 1 | 23 | 2 | 1 | 0 | 1 | 0 | 0 | 0 | 25 | 2 |
| Angers | Total | | 93 | 2 | 7 | 0 | 4 | 0 | 0 | 0 | 104 | 2 |
| Angers B | 2012–13 | CFA 2 | 18 | 0 | — | | — | | 0 | 0 | 18 | 0 |
| Angers B | 2015–16 | CFA 2 | 3 | 0 | — | | — | | 0 | 0 | 3 | 0 |
| Angers B | Total | | 21 | 0 | 0 | 0 | 0 | 0 | 0 | 0 | 21 | 0 |
| Dijon | 2016–17 | Ligue 1 | 10 | 0 | 2 | 0 | 0 | 0 | 0 | 0 | 12 | 0 |
| Dijon | 2017–18 | Ligue 1 | 6 | 0 | 0 | 0 | 1 | 0 | 0 | 0 | 7 | 0 |
| Dijon | 2018–19 | Ligue 1 | 3 | 0 | 2 | 0 | 0 | 0 | 0 | 0 | 5 | 0 |
| Dijon | Total | | 19 | 0 | 4 | 0 | 1 | 0 | 0 | 0 | 24 | 0 |
| Dijon B | 2016–17 | CFA 2 | 3 | 0 | — | | — | | 0 | 0 | 3 | 0 |
| Dijon B | 2017–18 | Championnat National 3 | 5 | 0 | — | | — | | 0 | 0 | 5 | 0 |
| Dijon B | 2018–19 | Championnat National 3 | 5 | 0 | — | | — | | 0 | 0 | 5 | 0 |
| Dijon B | Total | | 13 | 0 | 0 | 0 | 0 | 0 | 0 | 0 | 13 | 0 |
| Valour FC | 2020 | Canadian Premier League | 0 | 0 | 0 | 0 | — | | 0 | 0 | 0 | 0 |
| Career total | | | 250 | 4 | 11 | 0 | 5 | 0 | 0 | 0 | 266 | 4 |

=== International ===
As of 28 February 2020

Congo national team
| Year | Apps | Goals |
|---|---|---|
| 2014 | 5 | 0 |
| 2015 | 6 | 0 |
| 2016 | 5 | 0 |
| 2017 | 3 | 1 |
| Total | 19 | 1 |

=== International goals ===
As of 28 February 2020
Scores and results list Congo's goal tally first.

| # | Date | Venue | Opponent | Score | Result | Competition |
|---|---|---|---|---|---|---|
| 1 | 8 October 2017 | Borg El Arab Stadium, Alexandria, Egypt | Egypt | 1–1 | 1–2 | 2018 FIFA World Cup qualification |
