= Raphaël Garcia =

Canadian soccer player

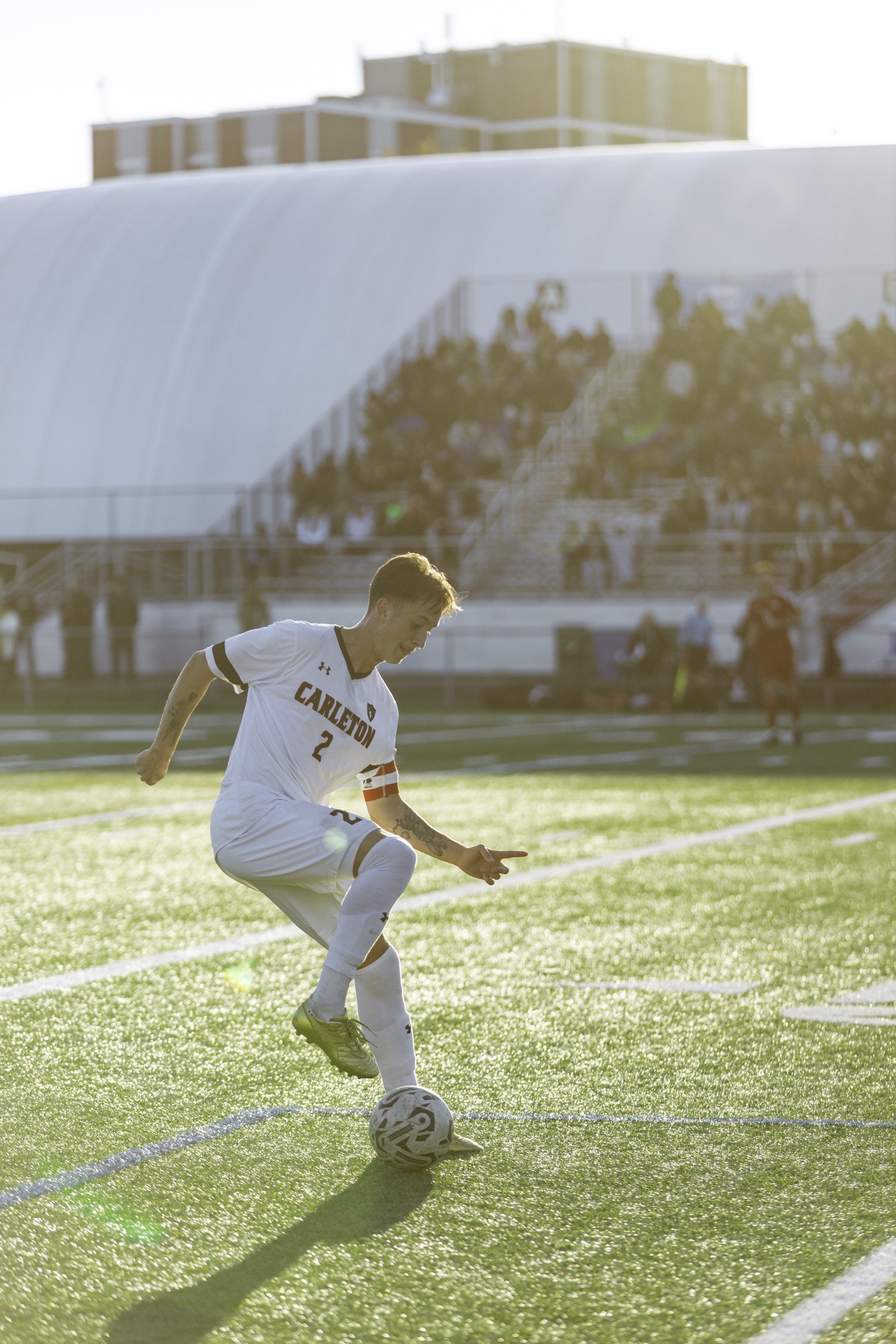
- Garcia - OUA Final 2023

Personal information
- Date of birth: May 6, 1999 (age 27)
- Place of birth: Ottawa, Ontario, Canada
- Height: 1.80 m (5 ft 11 in)
- Position: Right-back

Youth career
- 2005–2012: Gloucester Hornets
- 2012–2018: Montreal Impact

College career
Years	Team	Apps	(Gls)
2021–2023	Carleton Ravens	42	(7)

Senior career*
Years	Team	Apps	(Gls)
2019–2020	Valour FC	17	(0)
Total		17	(0)
- * Club domestic league appearances and goals as of 19 October 2021

Raphaël Garcia (born May 6, 1999) is a Canadian former soccer player.

== Early life ==
Garcia began playing soccer at age four, joining the Gloucester Hornets SC two year later. At age 13, he joined the Montreal Impact Academy, after being selected following attending open trials. On 7 September 2018, Garcia played in the Cap City Cup with USL Championship side Ottawa Fury in a 1–0 loss to Montreal Impact.

== University career ==
In 2021, Garcia began attending Carleton University, where he played for the men's soccer team, choosing to depart professional soccer due to the low salary in the Canadian Premier League. In his first season, he helped the team win a U Sports silver medal, and was and an OUA East First Team All-Star and a U Sports First Team All-Canadian and was named Ottawa's top soccer player at the 2021 Ottawa Sports Awards. In his second year, he earned Academic All-Canadian, Dean's Honours List, and won the U Sports Top 8 Academic All-Canadian Award. In his third and final season, he was named team captain and helped the side win the OUA title, and was also named an OUA East First Team All-Star and a U Sports Second Team All-Canadian. He also earned Carleton's Graduating Male Athlete of the Year award.

== Club career ==
In January 2019, Garcia signed a multi-year contract with Valour FC of the Canadian Premier League. He made his debut on May 11, 2019, starting in a 1-0 victory over HFX Wanderers FC. During the COVID-19 shortened 2020 season, he made only one appearance due to injury.

== International career ==
In November 2013, Garcia debuted in the Canadian youth program, attending an identification camp for the Canada U15 team.

== Career statistics ==
As of match played September 5, 2020

Club	Season	League			Playoffs		National cup		Total	
Club	Season	Division	Apps	Goals	Apps	Goals	Apps	Goals	Apps	Goals
Valour FC	2019	Canadian Premier League	16	0	—		0	0	16	0
Valour FC	2020	Canadian Premier League	1	0	—		—		1	0
Career total			17	0	0	0	0	0	17	0
