= Solomon Kojo Antwi =

Ghanaian professional footballer (born 2000)

Solomon Antwi
Personal information
- Full name: Solomon Kojo Antwi
- Date of birth: 25 September 2000 (age 26)
- Place of birth: Elmina, Ghana
- Height: 1.80 m (5 ft 11 in)
- Position: Winger

Youth career
- 2010–2019: Glow Lamp Academy

Senior career*
Years	Team	Apps	(Gls)
2020	Valour FC	4	(0)
- * Club domestic league appearances and goals as of 29 August 2020

Solomon Kojo Antwi (born 25 September 2000) is a Ghanaian professional footballer who plays as a winger.

== Early life ==
Born in Elmina, Antwi moved to Accra at age nine to live with his sister. He was subsequently recruited by Glow Lamp Academy, a programme run by former Ghana international Nii Lamptey, where he became one of the academy's top prospects.

== Club career ==
=== Early career ===
In February 2019, Antwi had agreed to sign with Belgian First Division A club Gent, but was unable to secure a Belgian visa. He was subsequently sought after by clubs in England, Hungary and Canada. In October 2019, Antwi scored the tying goal in a shock 2–1 come-from-behind win for Glow Lamp Academy in a friendly against Ghana Premier League side Hearts of Oak.

=== Valour FC ===
On 30 December 2019, Antwi signed his first professional contract with Canadian Premier League side Valour FC until the end of the 2020 season. He had originally agreed to sign with the club in summer 2019, but issues with Antwi's visa resulted in the official confirmation being delayed until the end of the year. He made his professional debut for Valour on August 16 against Cavalry FC. On 15 January 2020, Valour confirmed that Antwi had departed the club and returned to Ghana.

== International career ==
Antwi received call-ups to the Ghana U20 national team in 2019.
