= Federico Peña (footballer) =

Trinidadian footballer (born 1999)

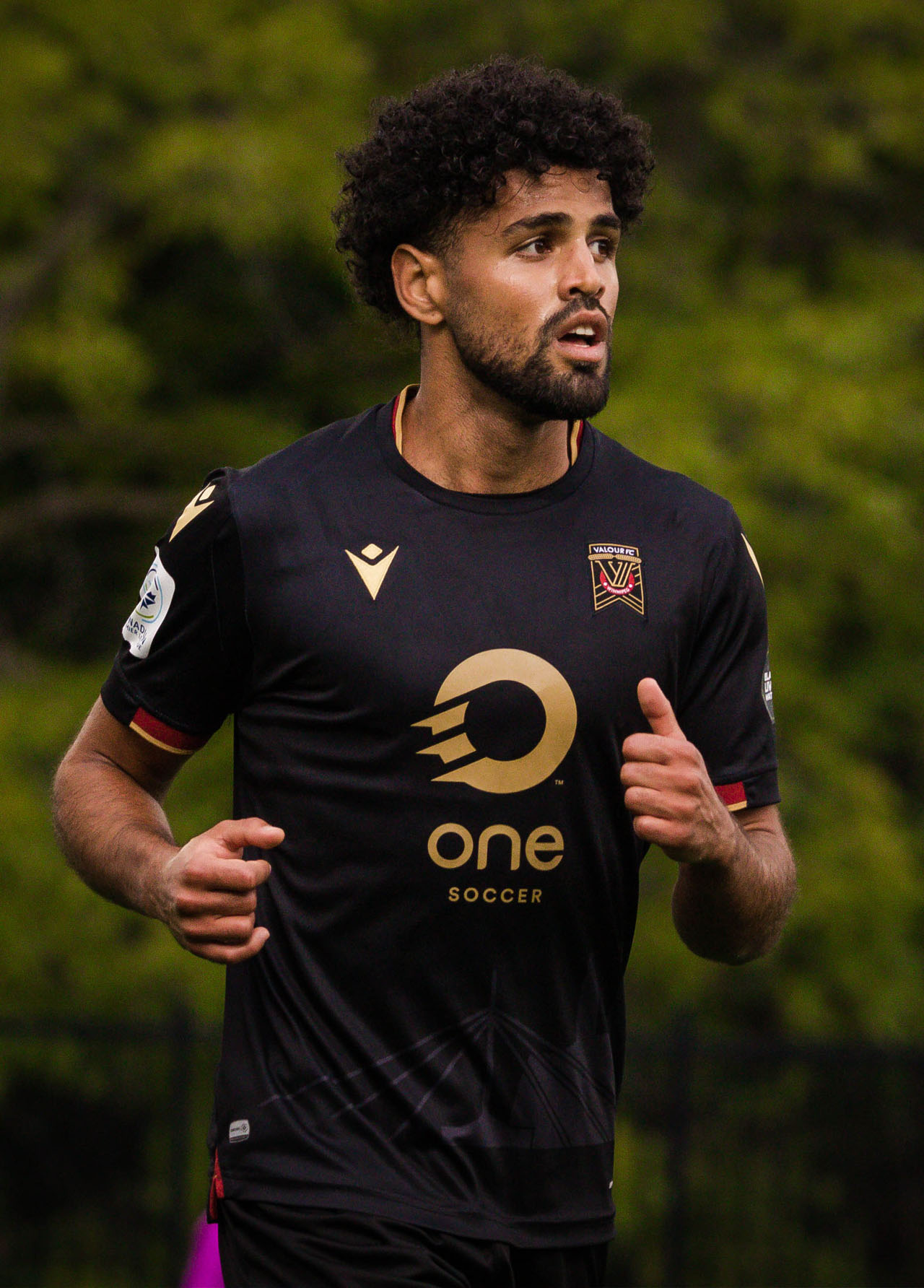
- Peña with Valour FC in 2021

Personal information
- Full name: Federico Rafael Mendes Peña
- Date of birth: 30 March 1999 (age 27)
- Place of birth: Port of Spain, Trinidad and Tobago
- Height: 1.75 m (5 ft 9 in)
- Positions: Fullback; winger

Youth career
- 2009–2013: Winnipeg South End United SC
- 2013–2015: Bonivital SC
- 2015–2017: Granite United
- 2017: Gent
- 2018: Standard Liège

Senior career*
Years	Team	Apps	(Gls)
2019–2022	Valour FC	59	(0)
2023	Umeå FC	2	(0)

International career^{‡}
2021–	Trinidad and Tobago	1	(0)
- * Club domestic league appearances and goals as of 22 August 2024 ‡ National team caps and goals as of 1 February 2021

Federico Rafael Mendes Peña (born 30 March 1999) is a Trinidadian footballer.

== Early life ==
Peña was born in Port of Spain, Trinidad and Tobago. He moved to Mississauga, Canada, before settling in Winnipeg, Canada in 2009. He began playing youth soccer in Canada with Winnipeg South End United SC in 2009. In 2013, he began playing with Bonivital SC, moving to Granite United from 2015 to 2017. He then joined the youth system of Belgian club Gent, playing for the U21 squad, while also training with the first team on occasion. In 2018, he joined the U21 team of Standard Liège.

== Club career ==
In March 2019, Peña went on trial with Valour FC of the Canadian Premier League ahead of the 2019 season. In April 2019, Peña signed with the club. He appeared in six of his team's seven matches in the 2020 shortened season, including having a red card overturned ahead of the final match of the season. In December 2020, the club picked up his option for the 2021 season. During the 2021 season, his playing time greatly increased, appearing in 26 matches, including being named Man of the Match in a 1-0 victory over Forge FC on July 11, 2021. In January 2022, he once again re-signed with the club for another season, with the club restructuring his contract, rather than just picking up his club option. In December 2022, he departed the club, upon the expiry of his contract.

In March 2023, he joined Umeå FC in the Swedish third tier Ettan on a one-year contract. He made two substitute appearances for the club that season.

In 2024, Peña returned to Canada and played at the adult amateur level with Winnipeg Lucania FC in the Manitoba Major Soccer League.

== International career ==
Peña is eligible to represent both Canada or Trinidad and Tobago internationally. In 2013 and 2014, Peña made his debut in the Canada national team, attending two identification camps for the Canada U15 team.

In March 2020, he was set to be called up by the Trinidad and Tobago national team ahead of a friendly against Canada, but it was ultimately cancelled due to the COVID-19 pandemic. After remaining in contact with the national team, he was again called up in January 2021 ahead of a friendly against the United States. He made his debut in that match on 31 January, as a starter.

== Personal ==
Peña is related to former Trinidad and Tobago national team goalkeeper Shaka Hislop. Peña's great-grandfather immigrated to Trinidad and Tobago from Portugal, which allowed Peña to obtain Portuguese citizenship, which enabled him to obtain a European passport allowing him to sign with Gent's youth teams.

== Career statistics ==
As of match played 22 August 2024

Club	Season	League			Playoffs		National cup		Continental		Total	
Club	Season	Division	Apps	Goals	Apps	Goals	Apps	Goals	Apps	Goals	Apps	Goals
Valour FC	2019	Canadian Premier League	8	0	—		0	0	—		8	0
Valour FC	2020	Canadian Premier League	6	0	—		—		—		6	0
Valour FC	2021	Canadian Premier League	24	0	—		2	0	—		26	0
Valour FC	2022	Canadian Premier League	21	0	—		1	0	—		22	0
Valour FC	Total		59	0	0	0	3	0	0	0	62	0
Umeå FC	2023	Ettan	2	0	—		0	0	—		2	0
Career total			61	0	0	0	3	0	0	0	64	0
