= Michele Paolucci =

Italian footballer

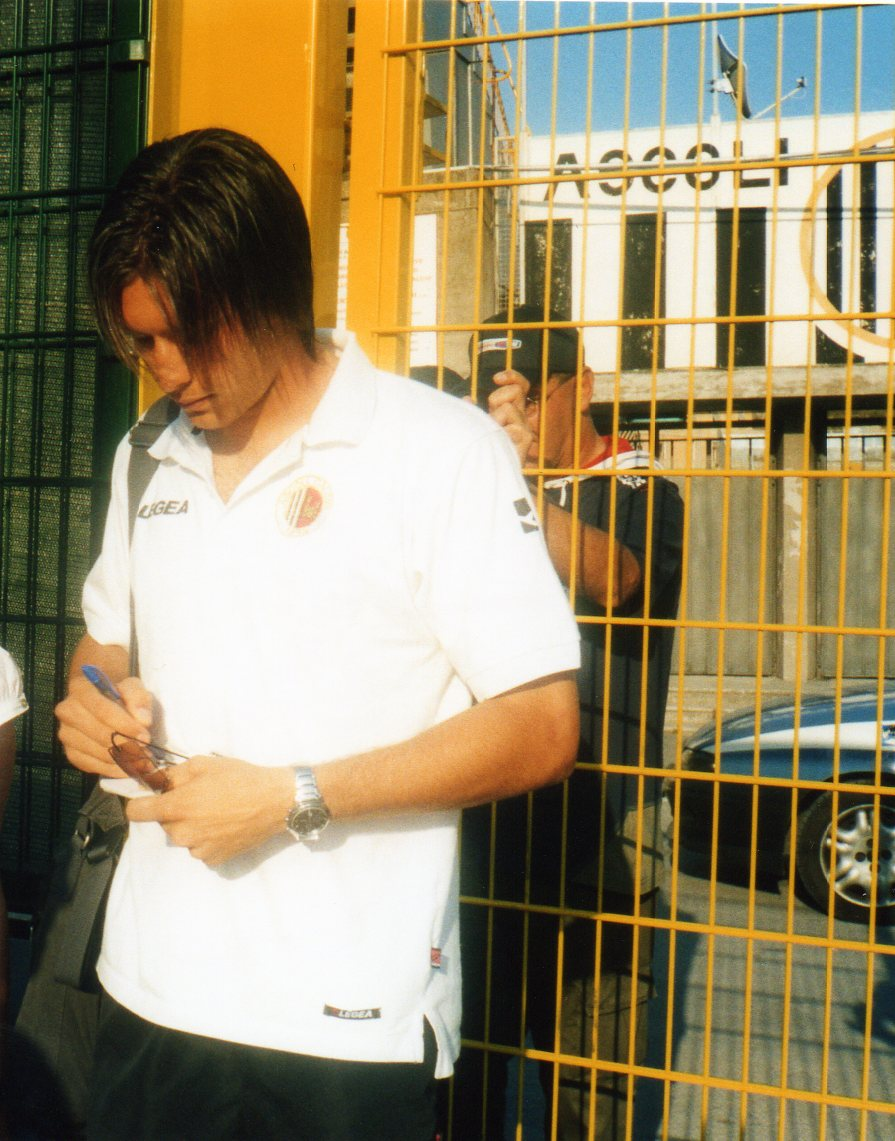

Personal information
- Date of birth: 6 February 1986 (age 40)
- Place of birth: Recanati, Italy
- Height: 1.82 m (6 ft 0 in)
- Position: Forward

Team information
- Current team: FC Manitoba

Youth career
- 2003–2006: Juventus

Senior career*
Years	Team	Apps	(Gls)
2006–2007	Juventus	0	(0)
2006–2007	→ Ascoli (loan)	31	(6)
2007–2009	Udinese	2	(0)
2008	→ Atalanta (loan)	9	(0)
2008–2009	→ Catania (loan)	26	(7)
2009–2014	Siena	39	(9)
2010	→ Juventus (loan)	4	(0)
2011	→ Palermo (loan)	2	(0)
2011–2012	→ Vicenza (loan)	41	(11)
2014–2015	Latina	39	(5)
2016	Petrolul Ploiești	12	(1)
2016–2017	Catania	18	(3)
2017	Ancona	14	(4)
2017–2018	Monopoli	14	(3)
2018	Floriana	4	(1)
2018–2019	Tarxien Rainbows	20	(7)
2019	Valour FC	15	(3)
2020–	FC Manitoba	12	(4)

International career
2003	Italy U17	6	(1)
2004–2005	Italy U19	4	(1)
2005	Italy U20	2	(0)
2006	Italy U21	1	(0)
- * Club domestic league appearances and goals as of 16 July 2022

Michele Paolucci (born 6 February 1986) is an Italian footballer who plays as a forward for Canadian club FC Manitoba.

== Club career ==
=== Juventus and loans ===
Paolucci came through the ranks at Juventus. After graduating from their Primavera youth team. However, despite being called up to the first team he never made an official Serie A appearance for the Old Lady. He played with Sebastian Giovinco and Claudio Marchisio.

In 2006–07 season he was loaned to Ascoli, made his team and Serie A debut on 10 September 2006, against Atalanta. After his successful spell at Ascoli where he would go on to score 6 goals in 32 Serie A appearances, he returned shortly to Juventus.

=== Udinese and loans ===
In mid-2007, he moved to Udinese on a co-ownership deal, as part of the Juventus's deal to sign Vincenzo Iaquinta. The price tag of Paolucci's 50% registration rights, was €1.355 million at that time. He made his official game debut in the Italian Cup, scored two goals against Bari on 29 August 2007. He made just 2 appearances in 5 months at Udinese.

In January 2008 Juventus and Udinese loaned him out to Atalanta, where he would play until 30 June 2008.

In June 2008, Juventus and Udinese again loaned Paolucci out, this time to Sicilian club, Catania. He scored 7 goals that season, in the Serie A and had been regularly included in first team action, under coach Walter Zenga. He made a total of 28 starts for the club.

=== Siena and loans ===
In June 2009, Paolucci returned to Udinese, but was immediately bought back fully by Juventus for €3.3 million. On 8 July 2009 he joined Siena on a co-ownership for the same price. He signed a 5-year contract. Paolucci did not manage to hold down a regular starting place at Siena, making just 10 Serie A appearances, and scoring just twice.

After not obtaining a regular starting place and also due to Juventus' striker injury crisis, he was loan back by Juventus on 16 January 2010, by Juve paying Siena €500,000. Originally acquired as addition to an injury-ridden team, Paolucci never broke into the first team and ended his second Juve stint with only four league appearances before to return to Siena, now relegated to Serie B.

After a disappointing period at Siena, with only one second-division appearance with the Tuscans, Paolucci accepted a loan move to Palermo on 31 January 2011, replacing the left of former Siena teammate Massimo Maccarone. He made his debut with the Sicilians only two days later, replacing Fabrizio Miccoli in the final minutes of a home game against his former team Juventus, ended in a 2–1 win for Palermo. Siena elected to loan him out once again to Vicenza for the 2011–12 season after the club acquired the residual 50% rights from Juve for free.

=== Latina ===
On 28 January 2014, Paolucci left Siena for Serie B side Latina, signed a four-and-a-half-year contract. In 2015, he was released by Latina.

=== Petrolul ===
On 9 December 2015, Paolucci signed a six-month contract with Romanian side Petrolul, with an option to extend it by a further year.

=== Catania and Ancona ===
In July 2016 he returned to Italy and moved to Catania; in January 2017 it was sold to Ancona.

=== Monopoli and Floriana ===
Paolucci joined Italian side Monopoli in mid-2017, and then Maltese side Floriana on 18 January 2018.

=== Valour FC ===
On 16 July 2019, Paolucci signed with Canadian Premier League side Valour FC.

=== FC Manitoba ===
On 10 September 2020, Paolucci signed with USL League Two side FC Manitoba as a player and assistant manager.

== International career ==
Paolucci made his U-21 team debut against Luxembourg U-21, 12 December 2006, replacing Nicola Pozzi at half time.

== Career statistics ==
As of 19 October 2019

Club statistics
Club	Season	League			National Cup (Note: Includes appearances and goals in the Coppa Italia and the Maltese FA Trophy.)		League Cup		Continental		Other		Total	
Club	Season	Division	Apps	Goals	Apps	Goals	Apps	Goals	Apps	Goals	Apps	Goals	Apps	Goals
Juventus	2005–06	Serie A	0	0	0	0	—		—		0	0	0	0
Ascoli (loan)	2006–07	Serie A	31	6	1	2	—		—		0	0	32	8
Udinese	2007–08	Serie A	2	0	4	2	—		—		0	0	6	2
Atalanta (loan)	2007–08	Serie A	9	0	0	0	—		—		0	0	9	9
Catania (loan)	2008–09	Serie A	26	7	2	2	—		—		0	0	28	9
Siena	2009–10	Serie A	10	2	1	0	—		—		0	0	11	2
Siena	2010–11	Serie B	1	0	0	0	—		—		0	0	1	0
Siena	2011–12	Serie A	0	0	0	0	—		—		0	0	0	0
Siena	2012–13	Serie A	10	2	1	0	—		—		0	0	11	2
Siena	2013–14	Serie B	18	5	5	2	—		—		0	0	23	7
Siena	Total		39	9	7	2	—		—		0	0	46	11
Juventus (loan)	2009–10	Serie A	4	0	1	0	—		0	0	0	0	5	0
Palermo (loan)	2010–11	Serie A	2	0	0	0	—		—		0	0	2	0
Vicenza (loan)	2011–12	Serie B	41	11	2	2	—		—		0	0	43	13
Latina	2013–14	Serie B	17	3	0	0	—		—		0	0	17	3
Latina	2014–15	Serie B	22	2	2	0	—		—		0	0	24	2
Latina	Total		39	5	2	0	—		—		0	0	41	5
Petrolul Ploiești	2015–16	Liga I	12	1	0	0	0	0	—		0	0	12	1
Catania	2016–17	Lega Pro	18	3	0	0	—		—		0	0	18	3
Ancona	2016–17	Lega Pro	14	4	0	0	—		—		0	0	14	4
Monopoli	2017–18	Serie C	14	3	0	0	—		—		0	0	14	3
Floriana	2017–18	Maltese Premier League	4	1	0	0	—		—		0	0	4	1
Tarxien Rainbows	2018–19	Maltese Premier League	20	7	2	3	—		—		0	0	22	10
Valour FC	2019	Canadian Premier League	15	3	0	0	—		—		0	0	15	3
FC Manitoba	2022	USL League Two	12	4	—		—		—		—		12	4
Career total			302	64	21	13	0	0	0	0	0	0	323	77
