= Adam Mitter =

English footballer

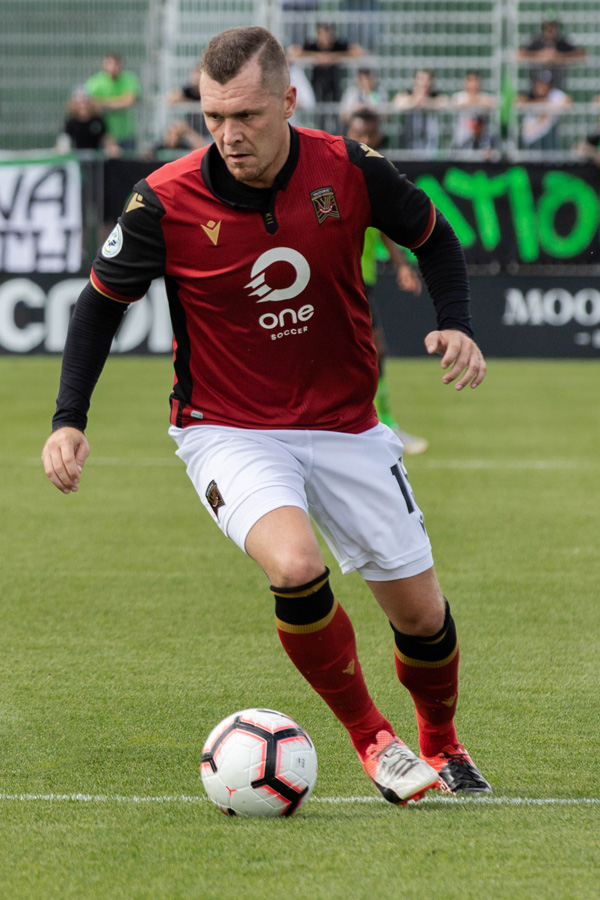
- Mitter playing for Valour FC in 2019

Personal information
- Full name: Adam Thomas Mitter
- Date of birth: 5 January 1993 (age 33)
- Place of birth: Shrewsbury, England
- Position: Centre-back

Team information
- Current team: Butwal Lumbini
- Number: 5

Youth career
- Southport
- 2009: Preston North End
- 2009–2011: Blackpool

Senior career*
| Years | Team | Apps | (Gls) |
| 2011–2012 | Hibernian | | |
| 2012 | Kettering Town | 3 | (0) |
| 2012 | Warrington Town | | |
| 2013 | Ånge IF | 20 | (3) |
| 2013 | Barrow | | |
| 2013–2014 | Chorley | | |
| 2014 | West Torrens Birkalla | 16 | (0) |
| 2015–2016 | Loyola Meralco | 29 | (5) |
| 2016 | Stafford Rangers | | |
| 2016–2017 | Fateh Hyderabad | 25 | (4) |
| 2017–2018 | Ilocos United | 15 | (1) |
| 2018 | Hougang United | 14 | (1) |
| 2018 | Global Cebu | 10 | (0) |
| 2019 | Valour FC | 20 | (0) |
| 2020 | Persiraja Banda Aceh | | |
| 2021 | Rayong | 12 | (0) |
| 2021 | Persita Tangerang | 10 | (0) |
| 2022 | PSM Makassar | 5 | (0) |
| 2022 | Pattaya United | | |
| 2022–2023 | Krabi | | |
| 2023–2024 | Bala Town | | |
| 2024 | → Colwyn Bay (loan) | | |
| 2024 | Persiraja Banda Aceh | 9 | (0) |
| 2025 | Nusantara United | 4 | (0) |
| 2025– | Butwal Lumbini | 3 | (0) |
- * Club domestic league appearances and goals as of 8 April 2025

Adam Thomas Mitter (born 5 January 1993) is an English professional footballer who plays as a centre-back for Butwal Lumbini.

A journeyman, Mitter has played at senior level for clubs from England, Scotland, Sweden, Australia, the Philippines, India, Singapore, Canada, Indonesia, Thailand and Nepal.

== Playing career ==
=== Preston North End ===
In early 2009, Mitter joined the youth academy of Championship club Preston North End.

=== Blackpool ===
In summer 2009, Mitter signed a two-year youth contract with English Premier League side Blackpool. During his time with the Seasiders, Mitter captained both the U18 team and the reserve team.

=== Hibernian ===
In August 2011, Mitter signed with Scottish Premier League side Hibernian.

=== Kettering Town ===
After leaving Hibs in autumn 2012, Mitter signed with newly relegated Southern Football League Premier Division club Kettering Town in early November as part of a major re-build of the squad. He was named captain at age 19 and made three appearances for Kettering before leaving the club in late November.

=== Warrington Town ===
On 1 December 2012, Mitter signed with Northern Premier League Division One North side Warrington Town.

=== Ånge IF ===
In January 2013, Mitter signed with Swedish Division 3 side Ånge IF despite offers in Iceland and Australia. Mitter was again named captain and helped the club earn promotion to Division 2.

=== Barrow ===
After a successful season in Sweden, Mitter returned to England and signed with Northern Premier League Premier Division side Barrow on 25 November 2013.

=== Chorley ===
Only a few weeks after joining Barrow however, Mitter signed with NPL Premier Division leaders Chorley on 16 December 2013.

=== West Torrens Birkalla ===
In 2014, Mitter signed in Australia with NPL South Australia side West Torrens Birkalla. He made 16 appearances that season as the Birks finished 11th out of 14.

=== Loyola Meralco ===
In January 2015, Mitter signed with Filipino United Football League club Loyola Meralco Sparks. He settled well in the country and helped the club win the 2014-15 PFF National Men's Cup and finish second in the league. After his first season, he extended his contract with the Sparks with the goal of winning the league title.

=== Stafford Rangers ===
In August 2016, Mitter returned to the Northern Premier League Premier Division, signing with Stafford Rangers.

=== Fateh Hyderabad ===
Turning out for Fateh Hyderabad for the 2016-17 I-League 2nd Division, the English centre-back stated that Indian football was on the rise, going on to say that it would someday match the big leagues. Mitter would also take up the role as club captain and guide them to the highest league finish and lowest number of goals conceded in the I-League 2nd Division preliminary round.

=== Ilocos United ===
In September 2017, Mitter returned to the Philippines to play for Philippines Football League side Ilocos United, where he was named captain of the team.

=== Hougang United ===
In January 2018, Mitter signed with Singaporean club Hougang United for the 2018 Singapore Premier League after receiving other offers in India and Malaysia.

=== Global Cebu ===
In July 2018, Mitter signed with Philippines Football League side Global Cebu, marking Mitter's third spell in the Philippines.

=== Valour FC ===
On 12 April 2019, Mitter signed with newly founded Canadian Premier League club Valour ahead of their inaugural season. That year, he made twenty league appearances and one appearance in the Canadian Championship. On 29 November 2019, the club announced that Mitter would not be returning for the following season.

=== Persiraja Banda Aceh ===
On 8 January 2020, Mitter signed a year contract with indonesian Liga 1 side Persiraja Banda Aceh. On 29 February 2020, Mitter made his competitive debut by starting in a 0–0 draw at Bhayangkara. On 10 December, Mitter decided to terminate his contract with Persiraja, it is almost certain that there will be no official professional football competition until the end of 2020. PSSI and PT LIB have decided to postpone the competition until February next year.

=== Rayong ===
In January 2021, Mitter agreed to join newly promoted Thai League 1 side Rayong.

=== Persita Tangerang ===
On 4 May 2021, Mitter signed a year contract with indonesian Liga 1 side Persita Tangerang. On 28 August, Mitter made his competitive debut by starting in a 1–2 win at Persipura Jayapura. He only made ten appearances with the club.

=== PSM Makassar ===
On 12 January 2022, Mitter signed a contract with indonesian Liga 1 side PSM Makassar.

In January 2024, he joined Cymru Premier side Colwyn Bay on loan until the end of the season from divisional rivals Bala Town.

In July 2024, Mitter returned to Indonesia to sign for Liga 2 side Persiraja Banda Aceh. On 19 January 2025, Mitter joined fellow Liga 2 side Nusantara United.

On 16 February 2025, through his personal Instagram account, Mitter announced that he would be retiring as a professional footballer.

== Personal life ==
Mitter's great-great-grandfather Monoronjan was from Calcutta, India and emigrated to England in 1880.

== Honours ==
Ånge IF

- Swedish Division 3, Förbundsserie Group: 2013

Chorley

- Northern Premier League Premier Division: 2013–14

Loyola Meralco

- PFF National Men's Club Championship: 2014–15
