= Tyler Attardo =

Canadian soccer player (born 2001)

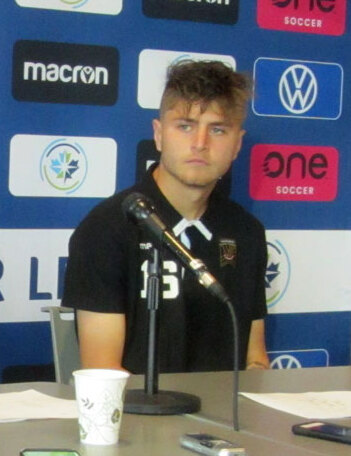
- Attardo in 2019

Personal information
- Full name: Tyler Shaun Massimo Attardo
- Date of birth: September 10, 2001 (age 25)
- Place of birth: Winnipeg, Manitoba, Canada
- Height: 1.85 m (6 ft 1 in)
- Position: Forward

Team information
- Current team: FC Manitoba

Youth career
- FC Northwest
- Winnipeg Phoenix FC
- 2017–2018: Chievo

College career
Years	Team	Apps	(Gls)
2023	York Lions	15	(12)

Senior career*
Years	Team	Apps	(Gls)
2019	Valour FC	20	(6)
2020–2022	Fernández Vial	0	(0)
2020–2021	→ Xylotymbou (loan)	28	(1)
2022	→ Granville (loan)	14	(2)
2022–2023	Saint-Colomban Locminé	10	(1)
2023	FC Manitoba	9	(5)
2024	Thunder Bay Chill	10	(0)
2026–	FC Manitoba	3	(1)
- * Club domestic league appearances and goals as of July 5, 2026

Tyler Shaun Massimo Attardo (born September 10, 2001) is a Canadian soccer player who plays as a forward for FC Manitoba in the Prairies Premier League.

== Early life ==
Attardo played youth soccer with FC Northwest and Winnipeg Phoenix FC and was also a member of the Manitoba provincial team at the U13 and U15 levels. In 2017, he participated in a Residency Academy program in Italy with Chievo, returning again in 2018, spending five months with the club on each occasion. He also trained with Chilean club Rangers de Talca for two weeks.

== University career ==
In 2023, he began attending York University, where he played for the men's soccer team. On September 7, 2023, he scored a hat-trick in a 3-1 victory over the Waterloo Warriors. On October 28, he scored a brace to lead the team into the semi-finals. In his first season, he was named an OUA West First Team All-Star.

== Club career ==
In October 2018, Attardo participated in the CPL open trials. In January 2019, Attardo signed with Canadian Premier League club Valour FC, making him the youngest player to sign in league history. On June 20, he made his first career start and scored his first professional goal, becoming the youngest ever goalscorer in the league in a match against Pacific FC. On September 15, he scored a brace in a 4–2 victory over York9 FC. In his sole season with the club, he scored six goals for the club in 22 games across all competitions.

In February 2020, Attardo transferred to Chilean Segunda División side Fernández Vial. The deal was for what is believed to have been a six figure fee, which made him the first player transferred to South America from the CPL and the youngest CPL player to be transferred. He originally had offers from clubs in Portugal, Switzerland, and Spain, but none were able to be completed prior to the closing of the European transfer window at the end of January, prompting his move to the Chilean club.

In September 2020, Attardo joined Cypriot Second Division club Xylotymbou on loan. It was later clarified that the move was a two-year loan deal and Fernández Vial intended to sell him to a European club the following summer.

In January 2022, Attardo went on loan with French Championnat National 2 side US Granville until the end of the season. He originally arrived at the club on October 30, 2021, to train, but could not join officially as the transfer window was not open. He made his debut on January 22 against Châteaubriant, playing sixteen minutes as a substitute.

In July 2022, Attardo signed with Championnat National 3 side Saint-Colomban Locminé. On January 14, 2023, he scored his first goal against Stade Briochin B. In March 2023, it was announced that he had departed the club and returned to Canada.

In May 2023, he joined FC Manitoba in USL League Two. In March 2024, he joined the Thunder Bay Chill.

== International career ==
In 2021, he had conversations with the coaching staff of the Canada U20 team about joining the squad, but has yet to receive an official call-up.

== Career statistics ==
As of July 5, 2026

Club statistics
Club	Season	League			Playoffs		National Cup (Note: Includes appearances in the Canadian Championship and Cypriot Cup.)		Continental		Total	
Club	Season	Division	Apps	Goals	Apps	Goals	Apps	Goals	Apps	Goals	Apps	Goals
Valour FC	2019	Canadian Premier League	20	6	—		2	0	—		22	6
Fernández Vial	2020	Segunda División Profesional de Chile	0	0	—		0	0	—		0	0
Xylotymbou (loan)	2020–21	Cypriot Second Division	28	1	—		1	0	—		29	1
Granville (loan)	2021–22	Championnat National 2	14	2	—		0	0	—		14	2
Saint-Colomban Locminé	2022–23	Championnat National 3	8	1	—		0	0	—		8	1
FC Manitoba	2023	USL League Two	9	5	—		—		—		9	5
Thunder Bay Chill	2024	USL League Two	10	0	0	0	—		—		10	0
FC Manitoba	2026	Prairies Premier League	3	1	—		—		—		3	1
Career total			92	14	0	0	3	0	0	0	95	14
