= Dylan Carreiro =

Canadian soccer player (born 1995)

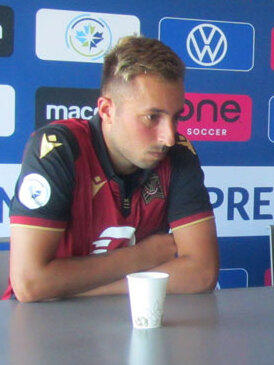
- Carreiro in 2019

Personal information
- Full name: Dylan Jorge Guilherme Labao Carreiro
- Date of birth: 20 January 1995 (age 31)
- Place of birth: Winnipeg, Manitoba, Canada
- Height: 1.73 m (5 ft 8 in)
- Position: Midfielder

Youth career
- Oriole SC
- FC Northwest
- WSA Winnipeg
- 2010–2012: Toronto FC
- 2012–2014: Queens Park Rangers

College career
Years	Team	Apps	(Gls)
2017–2018	York Lions	27	(9)

Senior career*
Years	Team	Apps	(Gls)
2014–2015	Dundee	3	(0)
2014	→ Arbroath (loan)	11	(5)
2015	→ Arbroath (loan)	7	(0)
2016–2017	Woodbridge Strikers	36	(10)
2018	Vaughan Azzurri	0	(0)
2019–2020	Valour FC	30	(3)
2021–2023	Vaughan Azzurri	21	(6)

International career^{‡}
2011	Canada U17	1	(0)
2013	Canada U20	2	(1)
2015	Canada U23	2	(0)
- * Club domestic league appearances and goals as of April 12, 2023 ‡ National team caps and goals as of 28 January 2019

Dylan Jorge Guilherme Labao Carreiro (born 20 January 1995) is a Canadian former professional soccer player who played as a midfielder.

== Early and personal life ==
Carreiro was born in Winnipeg, Manitoba, where he attended Clifton School and Garden City Collegiate before moving at the age of 16 to Toronto.

== Club career ==
=== Early career ===
Carreiro began his career in his native Winnipeg, playing with Oriole SC, FC Northwest, and the World Soccer Academy. He also played for the youth teams of Toronto FC, initially with the academy's junior team in the Canadian Soccer League's second division in 2011. In 2012, he left Toronto's academy and went abroad to join the youth system of Queens Park Rangers.

=== Dundee ===
Carreiro signed for Scottish club Dundee in August 2014. In September 2014, he was praised by Dundee youth coach Eddie Johnson. Later that month, he joined Arbroath on loan. Dundee manager Paul Hartley stated that "If he does well enough [at Arbroath] he has a chance [at Dundee] later in the season." Carreiro made his Dundee debut against rivals Dundee United on 1 January 2015, appearing as a 71st-minute substitute in the Dundee derby. On 2 February 2015, Carreiro returned to Arbroath for a second loan spell. Carreiro left Dundee via mutual consent on 22 December 2015.

=== Woodbridge Strikers ===
Carreiro joined League1 Ontario side Woodbridge Strikers ahead of the 2016 season. Carreiro would be named the League1 Ontario MVP for the 2017 League1 Ontario season.

=== York University ===
While playing in League1 Ontario, Carreiro attended York University, where he played varsity soccer for the York Lions. In 2017, he made 17 appearances for York, scoring nine goals. In 2018, he made 10 appearances.

=== Vaughan Azzurri ===
In 2018, Carreiro appeared in the final of the League1 Ontario playoffs for Vaughan Azzurri against his former club, Woodbridge Strikers.

=== Valour FC ===
In November 2018, Carreiro returned to Winnipeg to sign for Valour FC. He made his debut and scored his first goal for the club on 1 May against Pacific FC. On 16 January 2020, Valour announced Carreiro would be returning to the club for the 2020 CPL season. On 19 October 2020, Carreiro was released by Valour so he could pursue a coaching opportunity in the Toronto area that would potentially also allow him to continue playing in the Canadian Premier League.

=== Later career ===
He announced his retirement from professional soccer in February 2021, at the age of 26. He returned to the semi-professional League1 Ontario, re-joining former club Vaughan Azzurri, as a coach and player.

== International career ==
Carreiro has represented Canada at youth level. In September 2013, he received his first call-up to a senior team training camp. In December 2013, Carreiro was named the Canadian U-20 Male Player of the Year.

In September 2014, he received his first call-up to the senior team.

Carreiro was named to the U23 team for the 2015 CONCACAF Men's Olympic Qualifying Championship on 28 September 2015.

== Career statistics ==
As of 18 April 2023

Appearances and goals by club, season and competition
Club	Season	League			National Cup		League Cup		Other		Total	
Club	Season	League	Apps	Goals	Apps	Goals	Apps	Goals	Apps	Goals	Apps	Goals
Dundee	2014–15	Scottish Premiership	1	0	0	0	0	0	—		1	0
Dundee	2015–16	Scottish Premiership	2	0	0	0	1	0	—		3	0
Dundee	Total		3	0	0	0	1	0	0	0	4	0
Arbroath (loan)	2014–15	Scottish League Two	18	5	1	0	0	0	2	0	21	5
Woodbridge Strikers	2016	League1 Ontario	16	4	—		1	0	—		17	4
Woodbridge Strikers	2017	League1 Ontario	20	6	—		4	2	—		24	8
Woodbridge Strikers	Total		36	10	0	0	5	2	0	0	41	12
Vaughan Azzurri	2018	League1 Ontario	0	0	—		0	0	1	0	1	0
Valour FC	2019	Canadian Premier League	23	2	1	0	—		—		24	2
Valour FC	2020	Canadian Premier League	7	1	—		—		—		7	1
Valour FC	Total		30	3	1	0	0	0	0	0	31	3
Vaughan Azzurri	2021	League1 Ontario	6	0	—		—		1	1	7	1
Vaughan Azzurri	2022	League1 Ontario	14	6	—		—		2	1	16	7
Vaughan Azzurri	2023	League1 Ontario	1	0	1	0	—		0	0	2	0
Vaughan Azzurri	Total		21	6	1	0	0	0	3	2	25	8
Career total			108	24	3	0	6	2	6	2	123	28

== Honours ==
Individual

- Canadian U-20 International Player of the Year: 2013
- League1 Ontario Second Team All Star: 2016
- League1 Ontario First Team All Star: 2017
