= Mathias Janssens =

Belgian footballer

Personal information
- Full name: Mathias Janssens
- Date of birth: 9 March 1998 (age 28)
- Place of birth: Brussels, Belgium
- Height: 1.86 m (6 ft 1 in)
- Position: Goalkeeper

Team information
- Current team: UR La Louvière
- Number: 16

Youth career
- 2003–2012: Tubize
- 2012–2014: Mons
- 2014–2015: Gent
- 2015–2016: Waasland-Beveren

Senior career*
| Years | Team | Apps | (Gls) |
| 2016–2018 | Waasland-Beveren | 0 | (0) |
| 2018–2019 | RAAL La Louvière | 1 | (0) |
| 2019 | Valour FC | 12 | (0) |
| 2021–2022 | RAAL La Louvière | 3 | (0) |
| 2022–2024 | Olympic Charleroi | 8 | (0) |
| 2024– | UR La Louvière | 17 | (0) |

International career
| 2013 | Belgium U15 | 2 | (0) |
| 2013 | Belgium U16 | 1 | (0) |
| 2016 | Belgium U18 | 1 | (0) |
- * Club domestic league appearances and goals as of 20:48, 26 December 2024 (UTC)

Mathias Janssens (born 9 March 1998) is a Belgian professional footballer who plays for club UR La Louvière as a goalkeeper.

== Club career ==
=== Early career ===
Janssens began playing football in 2003 with Tubize. In 2012, he switched to the academy of Belgian First Division A side Mons and then to Gent for one season in 2014.

=== Waasland-Beveren ===
In 2015, Janssens signed with Belgian First Division A side Waasland-Beveren. In 2016 he began playing for the reserve team and made his first appearance on first-team bench on 30 April 2016. He left Waasland-Beveren in summer 2018.

=== La Louvière ===
On 5 October 2018, Janssens signed with Belgian Second Amateur Division side RAAL La Louvière. On 11 December 2018, he made his debut in a 2–2 draw against URSL Visé.

=== Valour FC ===
On 31 January 2019, Janssens signed with Canadian Premier League side Valour FC. On 12 May 2019, he made his professional debut in a 1–0 win over HFX Wanderers FC. In his second game for Valour, he kept another clean sheet in a 1–0 victory over FC Edmonton. During the 2019 Canadian Premier League season, Janssens split the goalkeeping duties at Valour with Tyson Farago. He ended up playing 12 out of 28 league games, as well as one Canadian Championship match.

=== Return to La Louvière ===
After one and a half years without club, Janssens returned to RAAL La Louvière, signing with the club in the summer 2021.

== Personal life ==
Janssens' twin brother Christophe is also a footballer and plays for Westerlo in Belgium.
