= Martín Arguiñarena =

Uruguayan footballer (born 1991)

Personal information
- Full name: Cristian Martín Arguiñarena Pombo
- Date of birth: 6 September 1991 (age 35)
- Place of birth: Montevideo, Uruguay
- Height: 1.75 m (5 ft 9 in)
- Position: Left-back

Team information
- Current team: Progreso
- Number: 6

Senior career*
Years	Team	Apps	(Gls)
2010–2016	Villa Teresa	63	(4)
2017	El Tanque Sisley	35	(0)
2018	Boston River	22	(1)
2019	Valour FC	18	(0)
2020	Villa Teresa	14	(1)
2021–	Progreso	5	(0)
- * Club domestic league appearances and goals as of 3:14, 3 September 2021 (UTC)

Cristian Martín Arguiñarena Pombo (born 6 September 1991) is a Uruguayan professional footballer who plays as a left-back for Progreso.

== Career ==
=== Villa Teresa ===
In 2010, Arguiñarena signed his first senior contract with Uruguayan Segunda División Amateur side Villa Teresa. He played with Villa Teresa for six years, helping the club earn promotion to the Segunda División in 2011 and then to the Primera División in 2015.

In his first season in the Primera División Arguiñarena made 26 appearances for Villa Teresa, scoring three goals.

=== El Tanque Sisley ===
In February 2017, Arguiñarena joined El Tanque Sisley ahead of the 2017 Primera División season. That season he made a career-high 35 Primera División appearances.

=== Boston River ===
In January 2018, Arguiñarena signed with Boston River. That season he made 22 league appearances, scoring one goal. On 25 July 2018, he made his continental debut in the Copa Sudamericana as an injury time substitute for Boston River in a 1–0 win over Argentinian club Banfield.

=== Valour FC ===
Arguiñarena signed a multi-year deal with Canadian Premier League club Valour FC on 25 February 2019. That season, he made eighteen league appearances and two appearances in the Canadian Championship. In January 2020, Valour announced that he had been released from his contract.

=== Return to Villa Teresa ===
On 1 February 2020, Arguiñarena signed with Villa Teresa, now in the Uruguayan Segunda División.

== Career statistics ==
As of 8 February 2020

Club statistics
Club	Season	League			National Cup (Note: Includes appearances in the Canadian Championship.)		Continental (Note: Includes appearances in the Copa Sudamericana.)		Other (Note: Includes appearances in the Uruguayan Segunda División Promotion Playoffs.)		Total	
Club	Season	Division	Apps	Goals	Apps	Goals	Apps	Goals	Apps	Goals	Apps	Goals
Villa Teresa	2013–14	Uruguayan Segunda División	14	0	—		—		6	0	20	0
Villa Teresa	2014–15	Uruguayan Segunda División	23	1	—		—		1	0	24	1
Villa Teresa	2015–16	Uruguayan Primera División	26	3	—		—		0	0	26	3
Villa Teresa	Total		63	4	0	0	0	0	7	0	70	4
El Tanque Sisley	2017	Uruguayan Primera División	35	0	—		—		0	0	35	0
Boston River	2018	Uruguayan Primera División	22	1	—		1	0	0	0	23	0
Valour FC	2019	Canadian Premier League	18	0	2	0	—		0	0	20	0
Career total			138	5	2	0	1	0	7	0	148	5
