= José Galán =

Spanish footballer

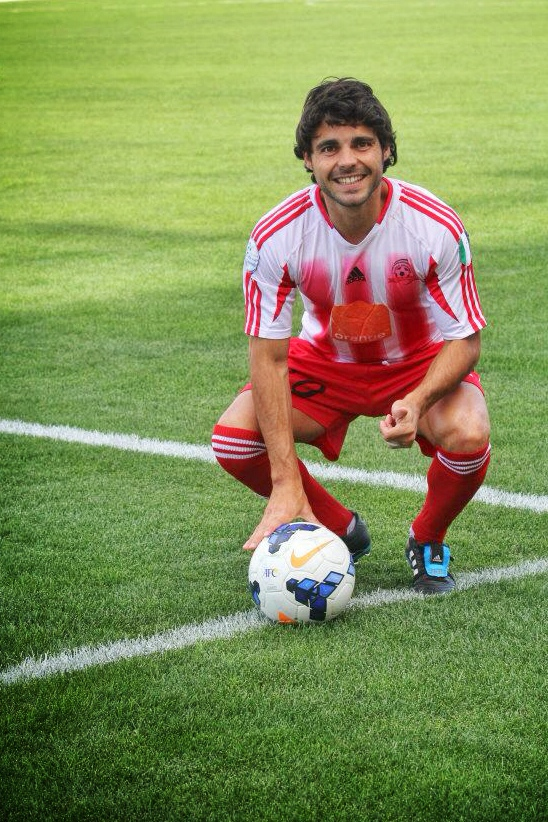

Personal information
- Full name: José Antonio Pedrosa Galán
- Date of birth: 2 February 1986 (age 40)
- Place of birth: León, Spain
- Height: 1.77 m (5 ft 10 in)
- Position: Midfielder

Team information
- Current team: Manchester 62 (player-head coach)
- Number: 21

Youth career
- San Lorenzo
- Cultural Leonesa

Senior career*
Years	Team	Apps	(Gls)
2005–2006	Atlético Madrid C	21	(2)
2006	Atlético Madrid B	1	(0)
2006–2007	Toledo	34	(5)
2007–2010	Almería B	68	(3)
2010–2011	Atlético Astorga	5	(0)
2011	Comarca Níjar	11	(1)
2011–2012	Cultural Leonesa	24	(1)
2012–2013	Chainat	33	(2)
2013–2014	Pro Duta	41	(4)
2014	St. Pölten	22	(0)
2015	Shabab Al-Ordon	32	(1)
2015	Aris Limassol	2	(0)
2016	Ceahlăul	14	(2)
2016	Persela Lamongan	32	(4)
2016	RoPS	16	(0)
2017	Hospitalet	18	(0)
2017	Santa Coloma	1	(0)
2017–2018	Dreams	28	(1)
2018	Al-Shamal	27	(2)
2019	Al-Jabalain	21	
2019–2020	Valour FC	18	(1)
2020–2021	Villarrobledo	13	(1)
2021	Valour FC	20	(0)
2022–2024	Bruno's Magpies	32	(3)
2023–2024	→ Europa (loan)	11	(0)
2024-2025	Europa	8	(1)
2025	Novoli Calcio 1942		
2025	Glacis United	2	(0)
2026–	Manchester 62	5	(0)

Managerial career
- 2025: Glacis United (interim)
- 2026–: Manchester 62
- * Club domestic league appearances and goals as of 2 March 2026

José Antonio Pedrosa Galán (born 2 February 1986) is a Spanish professional footballer who plays for Gibraltar Football League club Manchester 62. A known journeyman, Galan is currently the Spanish player who has played in the most countries (16).

== Club career ==
=== Spain ===
Galán was born in León, Castile and León. A Cultural y Deportiva Leonesa youth graduate, he made his debut as a senior with Atlético Madrid's C-team in 2005, in Tercera División; in the same season, matches with the reserves in Segunda División B.

In 2007, after one year at CD Toledo, Galán moved to UD Almería, being initially assigned to the B-side. In November 2009, after being already called up to the main squad by manager Hugo Sánchez, he suffered a serious knee injury which sidelined him for ten months.

Galán was subsequently released by the Rojiblancos, and returned to action in September 2010 while playing for division four club Atlético Astorga FC. In January of the following year, he moved to CD Comarca de Níjar in the same tier.

=== Journeyman ===
On 16 July 2011, Galán returned to his first club Cultural. On 31 January of the following year he moved abroad, after agreeing to a one-year deal with Chainat FC from the Thai Premier League; he was also the first Spaniard to ever appear in the competition.

In June 2012, Galán was released due to an ankle injury. In February 2013, he signed a two-year contract with Liga Indonesia Premier Division team Pro Duta FC, becoming the first Spanish footballer in the country in the process.

Galán switched teams and countries again on 1 March 2014, signing for Austrian Football First League's SKN St. Pölten. After appearing rarely, he moved to Shabab Al-Ordon Club in Jordania.

On 3 September 2015, Galán joined Cypriot First Division club Aris Limassol FC. He left in December due to a lack of payment, meeting the same fate at his next team, CSM Ceahlăul Piatra Neamț from Romania.

Still in 2016, Galán represented Persela Lamongan in the Indonesia Soccer Championship and Finnish Veikkausliiga's Rovaniemen Palloseura. Whilst in representation of the former, he was selected to the July Team of the Month.

On 26 July 2017, after unassuming spells at CE L'Hospitalet and FC Santa Coloma (with whom he appeared in the first qualifying round of the UEFA Champions League against FC Alashkert, a 1–1 home draw), Galán joined Hong Kong Premier League club Dreams Sports Club. Roughly one year later, he switched teams and countries again after signing for Al-Shamal SC in the Qatargas League.

=== Valour FC ===
On 15 July 2019, Galán signed a multi-year contract with Canadian Premier League side Valour FC. After making 13 league appearances in his first year and having adapted well to Winnipeg, he was retained for the following season. In September 2020 Galán signed with Spanish side Villarrobledo on a season-long deal. The deal was with the view to return to Valour for the 2021 Canadian Premier League season. On 10 May 2021, he re-signed with Valour.

In January 2022 he announced his time in Winnipeg was ending.
