= Diego Gutiérrez (soccer, born 1997) =

Canadian soccer player (born 1997)

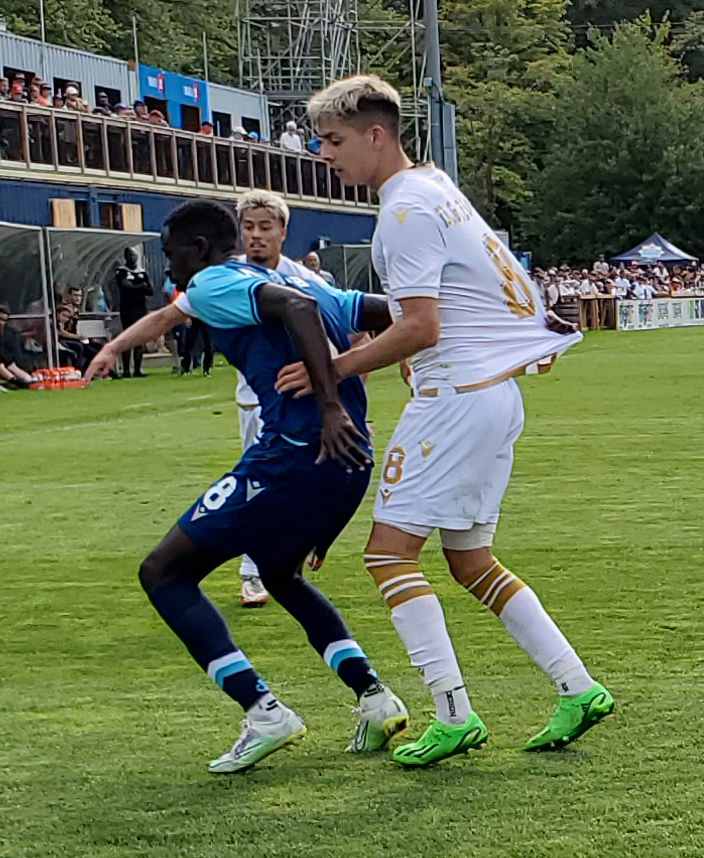
- Gutiérrez with Valour FC in 2022

Personal information
- Full name: Diego Nicolás Gutiérrez Zúñiga
- Date of birth: February 18, 1997 (age 29)
- Place of birth: Greenfield Park, Quebec, Canada
- Height: 1.79 m (5 ft 10 in)
- Position: Midfielder

Team information
- Current team: Atlético Ottawa

Youth career
- Colo-Colo
- Palestino

Senior career*
Years	Team	Apps	(Gls)
2015–2019	Palestino	8	(0)
2019–2020	Valour FC	30	(0)
2021	Barnechea	12	(1)
2022–2023	Valour FC	49	(4)
2024–2025	Cavalry FC	42	(1)
2026	Phnom Penh Crown	0	(0)
2026–	Atlético Ottawa	9	(0)

International career
2017	Canada U20	3	(0)
- * Club domestic league appearances and goals as of 17 October 2026

Diego Nicolás Gutiérrez Zúñiga (born February 18, 1997) is a Canadian professional soccer player who plays for Atlético Ottawa in the Canadian Premier League.

== Early life ==
Gutiérrez was born to Chilean parents in Greenfield Park, Quebec in Canada and moved to Santiago in Chile when he was three years old. He began playing soccer at age five in the Colo-Colo academy. Afterwards, he joined the youth setup of Palestino.

== Club career ==
On November 6, 2015, Gutiérrez made his senior league debut for Palestino against Deportes Antofagasta. He departed the club in March 2019.

In March 2019, Gutiérrez signed a deal with Canadian Premier League club Valour FC. After the season, the club exercised his option for the 2020 season.

In March 2021, Gutiérrez returned to Chile, signing with Primera B side Barnechea.

In December 2021, Gutiérrez returned for a second spell at Valour FC for the 2022 season. He was named the league's Player of the Month in April 2023. After not scoring in his first three seasons with Valour (across both stints), he netted four goals in the 2023 season. After the 2023 season, he chose to depart the club, after declining an extension offer.

In January 2024, he signed with Cavalry FC on a two-year contract, with an option for 2026. Gutierrez's option for the 2026 season would not be exercised by the club.

In February 2026, he signed with Cambodian Premier League club Phnom Penh Crown. He moved back to Canada and joined Atlético Ottawa on a deal through the 2026 Canadian Premier League season, with an option for 2027.

== International career ==
Eligible to represent both Canada and Chile internationally, Gutiérrez was called up to the Chile U20 team in June 2016 for a pair of friendlies against Paraguay. However, he did not play in either match.

In January 2017, Gutiérrez was called up to a camp for the Canadian U20 team for the first time. He made his debut against the Panama U20 in a friendly on January 20. He subsequently made the roster for the 2017 CONCACAF U-20 Championship, where he made two appearances.

== Personal life ==
His twin brother Cristián is also a professional soccer player.

== Honours ==
Palestino

- Copa Chile: 2018

Cavalry FC

- Canadian Premier League: 2024
