= Yohan Le Bourhis (soccer) =

Canadian soccer player

Personal information
- Full name: Yohan Georges Francis Yvon Le Bourhis
- Date of birth: 9 March 2000 (age 26)
- Place of birth: Montreal, Quebec, Canada
- Height: 1.86 m (6 ft 1 in)
- Position: Centre-back

Youth career
- Mont-Royal Outremont
- 2012–2019: Montreal Impact

College career
Years	Team	Apps	(Gls)
2023	Montreal Carabins		

Senior career*
Years	Team	Apps	(Gls)
2019	AS Blainville	3	(0)
2019–2020	Valour FC	9	(1)
2021–2022	CD Almuñecar City	27	(1)

International career^{‡}
2015	Canada U15		
2017	Canada U17	2	(0)
2018	Canada U20	3	(0)
- * Club domestic league appearances and goals as of 13 May 2022 ‡ National team caps and goals as of 10 August 2019

Yohan Georges Francis Yvon Le Bourhis (born March 9, 2000) is a Canadian soccer player who plays as a centre-back.

== Early life ==
Le Bourhis began playing youth soccer at age six with CS Mont-Royal Outremont. In 2013, he joined the Montreal Impact Academy, remaining there until 2019.

== University career ==
In 2023, he began attending the Université de Montréal, where he played for the men's soccer team. He was named to the 2023 U Sports Men's Soccer Championship All-Star team.

== Club career ==
In 2019, Le Bourhis joined Première Ligue de soccer du Québec side AS Blainville.

In August 2019, Le Bourhis signed a professional contract with Valour FC of the Canadian Premier League. At the end of the season, the club picked up his option for the 2020 season.

In 2021, he joined Spanish club CD Almuñecar City in the seventh tier Primera Andaluza Granada.

== International career ==
In 2012, he played with the Canada U12 at the Danone Nations Cup in Poland.

In 2015, Le Bourhis received his first national team call-up to the Canada U15 team for a friendly five-nation tournament in Mexico. In 2016 and 2017, he earned several call-ups with the Canada U17, including the 2017 CONCACAF U-17 Championship. In 2018, Le Bourhis was called up to the Canada U20 for the 2018 CONCACAF U-20 Championship. In February 2020, he was named to the Canada U23 provisional roster for the 2020 CONCACAF Men's Olympic Qualifying Championship.
