= Nicolás Galvis =

Canadian soccer player (born 1997)

Personal information
- Full name: Nicolás Galvis Llano
- Date of birth: 9 April 1997 (age 29)
- Place of birth: Bogotá, Colombia
- Height: 1.82 m (6 ft 0 in)
- Position: Midfielder

Youth career
- 2002–2004: Once Caldas
- St. Catharines Concord SC
- Oakville SC
- 2013: Defensor Sporting
- Burlington SC

College career
Years	Team	Apps	(Gls)
2015	Niagara Purple Eagles		

Senior career*
Years	Team	Apps	(Gls)
2016	Canadian SC	6	(0)
2017–2018	Deportivo Pereira	4	(0)
2019	Valour FC	11	(0)
2021–2022	Guelph United	1	(0)
2022	FC Berlin	3	(1)
2023	Scrosoppi FC	0	(0)
Total		25	(1)
- * Club domestic league appearances and goals as of 24 February 2023

Nicolás Galvis Llano (born 9 April 1997) is a former professional soccer player who plays as a midfielder. Born in Colombia and raised in Canada, he has previously accepted call-ups to the Canada national team.

== Early life ==
Galvis was born in Bogotá, Colombia and lived with his family in Manizales and began playing soccer at age five with Once Caldas. At the age of seven, his family moved to St. Catharines, Canada, where he began playing with St. Catharines Concord SC. Afterwards, he played youth soccer with Oakville SC and in February 2013, he went to trial with Uruguayan club Defensor Sporting, where he was invited to stay on with the U16 team. He returned to Canada and played youth soccer with Burlington SC.

In 2015, he began playing college soccer with the Niagara Purple Eagles.

== Club career ==
In 2016, he debuted at the senior level for Canadian SC in the Uruguayan Segunda División. In 2017, he went on trial with his former youth club Once Caldas. Later in 2017, he signed with Deportivo Pereira in the Colombian Categoría Primera B.

On 26 February 2019, Galvis signed with Canadian Premier League side Valour FC.

In June 2021, Galvis signed with League1 Ontario side Guelph United, after having attended 2021 pre-season with his former club Valour FC. He played one match in 2021, as he suffered an injury that kept him out for the remainder of the season.

In October 2022, he signed with FC Berlin in the United Premier Soccer League.

In February 2023, he joined Scrosoppi FC in League1 Ontario.

== International career ==
He was called up by the Canadian senior team in June 2017 for a friendly against Curaçao, but did not play. He was named to Canada's provisional 40-man roster for the 2017 Gold Cup, but was ultimately not called up for the tournament.
