= Glenn Muenkat =

Canadian soccer player

Personal information
- Full name: Glenn Muenkat
- Date of birth: 3 January 1999 (age 27)
- Place of birth: Toronto, Ontario, Canada
- Height: 1.80 m (5 ft 11 in)
- Position: Midfielder

Youth career
- Ottawa Internationals
- 2013–2017: Toronto FC
- 2017–2018: 1. FC Kaiserslautern

Senior career*
Years	Team	Apps	(Gls)
2016–2017	Toronto FC III	30	(7)
2019	Valour FC	13	(0)

International career
2017	Canada U18	2	(0)
- * Club domestic league appearances and goals as of 19 October 2019

Glenn Muenkat (born 3 January 1999) is a Canadian soccer player who plays as a midfielder.

== Club career ==
=== Early career ===
After moving to from Toronto to Ottawa with his family at age four, Muenkat began playing soccer at age five with Ottawa Internationals. In 2013, he joined the academy programme of Major League Soccer side Toronto FC. In 2016, he played with Toronto FC III in League1 Ontario, scoring six goals in eighteen league appearances as well as in the Premier Development League with one goal in eight appearances.

The following season, he made another four league appearances for Toronto FC III before signing abroad with the academy of 2. Bundesliga side 1. FC Kaiserslautern. At Kaiserslautern, he played for the U-19 and U-21 teams, making seven appearances for the U-19s and scoring two goals for the U-21s.

=== Valour FC ===
On 8 January 2019, Muenkat returned to Canada and signed with Canadian Premier League side Valour FC. On 8 May 2019, he made his professional debut as a starter in a 1–0 loss to Cavalry FC. That season, Muenkat made thirteen league appearances, including two starts, and one appearance in the Canadian Championship. On 29 November 2019, the club announced that Muenkat would not be returning for the 2020 season.

== International career ==
In 2013 and 2014, Muenkat participated in two Canada U15 identification camps, and was later called up to two Canada U18 camps in 2015 and 2016.
