= Jordan Murrell =

Canadian professional soccer player (born 1993)

Personal information
- Full name: Jordan Peter Murrell
- Date of birth: May 2, 1993 (age 33)
- Place of birth: London, England
- Position: Defender

Youth career
- Pinnstars
- 2009–2011: Toronto FC

College career
Years	Team	Apps	(Gls)
2011–2014	Syracuse Orange	74	(5)

Senior career*
Years	Team	Apps	(Gls)
2013	Ocean City Nor'easters	7	(0)
2014	K-W United FC	6	(1)
2015	Real Monarchs	17	(0)
2016	Pittsburgh Riverhounds	12	(0)
2017–2018	Reno 1868	47	(3)
2019	Valour FC	20	(0)
2020	Las Vegas Lights	11	(0)

International career^{‡}
2011	Canada U18	5	(1)
2012–2013	Canada U20	3	(0)
2016	Canada U23	2	(0)
- * Club domestic league appearances and goals as of 3 October 2020 ‡ National team caps and goals as of 20 May 2016

Jordan Peter Murrell (born May 2, 1993) is a professional soccer player. Born in England, he represented Canada at youth level.

== Club career ==
=== Early career ===
Murrell began playing soccer at age four with Pinnstars FC in London.

Murrell spent 2009–2011 with Toronto FC's academy in the Canadian Soccer League. He began his young career in the U16s of the academy before getting promoted to the U18s in 2010. After strong years within the academy, he became captain of the U18 side in 2011.

In 2011, Murrell committed to playing four years of college soccer at Syracuse University between 2011 and 2014 earning many accolades.

While at college, Murrell played with USL PDL side Ocean City Nor'easters in 2013 and K-W United FC in 2014.

=== Real Monarchs ===
On January 20, 2015, Murrell was selected in the third round (57th overall) of the 2015 MLS SuperDraft by Real Salt Lake.

Murrell signed with Salt Lake's USL side Real Monarchs SLC on March 16, 2015. In 2015, the club declined 8 options, including Murrell.

=== Pittsburgh Riverhounds ===
After training with the club for most of preseason, Murrell signed with the Pittsburgh Riverhounds on March 24, 2016.

=== Reno 1868 ===
In December 2016, Murrell signed with USL expansion side Reno 1868 FC. In July 2017, he would score twice in a 9–0 rout over LA Galaxy II. Murrell would appear in 27 games for the club that season, a new career high.

Upon completion of the 2017 season, Reno 1868 announced that they had re-signed Murrell for the 2018 season. Murrell was released by Reno on December 3, 2018.

=== Valour FC ===
On January 8, 2019 Murrell returned to Canada, signing a multi-year contract with Valour FC in the Canadian Premier League. He made his debut for Valour on May 1 against Pacific FC. On August 13 Murrell was suspended 6 games after an altercation with the referee on August 5 during a match against HFX Wanderers which included him kicking over a table as he left the field. On January 17, 2020 Valour announced they had released Murrell from his contract.

=== Las Vegas Lights ===
On January 31, 2020, Murrell joined USL Championship side Las Vegas Lights.

== International career ==
In January 2011, Murrell made his first appearance for Canada's U18 national team in a training camp that was held in Costa Rica. He played in a pair of friendlies scoring in a friendly vs Costa Rica U18 national team Later in 2011, December Murrell was called for Canada's U18 national team to train in a USA based camp.

In July 2012, Murrell was called up for a Canada U20 national team camp. Murrell captained the team in one of friendlies vs Mexico's U20 national team while appearing in both.

In February 2013, Murrell was named to Canada's squad for the 2013 CONCACAF U20 Championship.

In May 2016, Murrell was called to Canada's U23 national team for a pair of friendlies against Guyana and Grenada. He saw action in both matches.

== Personal life ==
Murrell was born in London, England, and moved with his family moved to Markham, Ontario, when he was eleven years of age.
