= 2026 Corpus Christi FC season =

Corpus Christi FC
2026 season
- Owner: Dr. Kingsley Okonkwo
- Head coach: (Libya) Éamon Zayed
- Stadium: Corpus Christi Sports Complex
- USL League One: 12th
- U.S. Open Cup: NA
- USL Cup: Group Stage
- USL Playoffs: DNQ
- Top goalscorer: League: (United States) Blake Bowen (8 Goals); All: (United States) Blake Bowen (9 Goals)
- Highest home attendance: 2,830 vs FC Naples October 10
- Lowest home attendance: 268 vs Portland Hearts of Pine May 9
- Average home league attendance: 1,424, With USL Cup 1,363
- Biggest win: Corpus Christi FC 4–1 Sarasota Paradise June 20
- Biggest defeat: Westchester SC 5–1 Corpus Christi FC April 4

The 2026 Corpus Christi FC season was the eighth season in the club's existence as well as their first in USL League One, the third-tier of American soccer after spending seven seasons in USL League Two. Despite not playing in last year's US Open Cup, due to rule changes, Corpus Christi FC cannot compete in the U.S. Open Cup because expansion teams are not allowed to compete this year.

== Players and staff ==
=== Current roster ===
As of July 3, 2026

Note: Flags indicate national team as defined under FIFA eligibility rules; some limited exceptions apply. Players may hold more than one non-FIFA nationality.

No.	Pos.	Nation	Player
1	GK	IRL	James Talbot
2	DF	USA	Blake Bowen
3	DF	ARG	Tomas Ritondale
4	MF	IRL	Jack Keaney
5	DF	ENG	Sam Roscoe
6	MF	USA	Patrick Langlois
7	MF	TTO	Kaihim Thomas
8	DF	GER	Jackson Dietrich
9	FW	USA	Christian Chaney
10	MF	ESA	Alexis Cerritos
11	FW	COL	Leyder Robledo
12	FW	USA	Jake Keegan

No.	Pos.	Nation	Player
15	MF	USA	James Parks
17	FW	USA	Manzi Shalita
19	MF	USA	Kyle Barganski
20	DF	USA	Pierce Infuso
21	FW	ESP	Nacho Abeal
22	DF	TTO	Shannon Gomez
24	GK	SCO	Mason McCready
26	MF	USA	Bubu Medina
27	MF	USA	Tomas Pondeca
30	MF	PHI	Javier Mariona
33	MF	GHA	Enock Kwakwa
80	MF	JAM	Andrew Booth

1. USL Academy Contract

== Transfers ==
=== In ===
Date	Position	Number	Name	from	Type	Fee	Ref.
January 21, 2026	DF	6	(United States) Patrick Langlois	(United States) Portland Hearts of Pine	Signing	Free	
January 26, 2026	MF	8	(Germany) Jackson Dietrich	(United States) Forward Madison FC	Signing	Free	
January 27, 2026	MF	10	(El Salvador) Alexis Cerritos	(United States) AV Alta FC	Signing	Free	
January 28, 2026	DF	3	(Argentina) Tomas Ritondale	(United States) FC Naples	Signing	Free	
January 29, 2026	MF	8	(Republic of Ireland) Jack Keaney	(Northern Ireland) Cliftonville	Signing	Free	
January 31, 2026	GK	1	(Republic of Ireland) James Talbot	(Republic of Ireland) Bohemians	Signing	Free	
February 9, 2026	MF	33	(Ghana) Enock Kwakwa	(Sweden) Skövde AIK	Signing	Free	
February 10, 2026	MF	7	(Trinidad and Tobago) Kaihim Thomas	(Trinidad and Tobago) Defence Force	Signing	Free	
February 11, 2026	FW	12	(United States) Jake Keegan	(United States) Portland Hearts of Pine	Signing	Free	
February 12, 2026	MF	27	(United States) Tomas Pondeca	(United States) New Mexico United	Signing	Free	
February 13, 2026	DF	3	(United States) Blake Bowen	(United States) Huntsville City FC	Signing	Free	
February 16, 2026	FW	11	(Colombia) Leyder Robledo	(Colombia) Cúcuta Deportivo	Signing	Free	
February 17, 2026	FW	17	(United States) Manzi Shalita	(Puerto Rico) Ponce FC	Signing	Free	
February 18, 2026	GK	24	(Scotland) Mason McCready	(United States) Texoma FC	Signing	Free	
February 23, 2026	FW	9	(United States) Christian Chaney	(United States) Charlotte Independence	Signing	Free	
February 27, 2026	DF	20	(United States) Pierce Infuso	(United States) New York City FC II	Signing	Free	
March 6, 2026	DF	5	(England) Sam Roscoe	(Northern Ireland) Linfield	Signing	Free	
March 10, 2026	FW	21	(Spain) Nacho Abeal	(United States) North Carolina Tar Heels	Signing	Free	
March 11, 2026	DF	22	(Trinidad and Tobago) Shannon Gomez	(United States) Tormenta FC	Signing	Free	
March 12, 2026	MF	26	(United States) Bubu Medina	(United States) Lipscomb Bisons	Signing	Free	
March 13, 2026	MF	19	(United States) Kyle Barganski	(United States) San Antonio FC	Signing	Free	
March 24, 2026	MF	15	(United States) Sam Parks	(United States) Northern Colorado Hailstorm FC	Academy Contract	Free	
May 8, 2026	MF	80	(Jamaica) Andrew Booth	(United States) Spokane Velocity	Signing	Free	
July 3, 2026	MF	30	(Philippines) Javier Mariona	(United States) AV Alta FC	Loan	Free	
July 17, 2026	GK		(United States) Bill Hamid	(United States) AV Alta FC	Promotion	Free	
August 19, 2026	FW	18	(United States) Dominick Bachstein	(United States) FC Naples	Loan	Free	
August 19, 2026	FW	11	(United States) EJ Johnson	(United States) San Antonio FC	Loan	Free	
September 11, 2026	MF	23	(United States) Parker Vasic	(United States) Rhode Island Rams	Signing	Free	

=== Out ===
Date	Position	Number	Name	to	Type	Fee	Ref.

== Non-competitive fixtures ==
=== Friendlies ===
January 31	Corpus Christi FC	v	Houston Dutch Lions	Corpus Christi, Texas
				Stadium: Corpus Christi Sports Complex; Attendance: Closed to the public

February 7	Corpus Christi FC	v	Houston Christian Huskies	Corpus Christi, Texas
				Stadium: Corpus Christi Sports Complex; Attendance: Closed to the public

February 14	Corpus Christi FC	v	Incarnate Word Cardinals	Corpus Christi, Texas
				Stadium: Corpus Christi Sports Complex; Attendance: Closed to the public

February 22	Austin FC II	v	Corpus Christi FC	Austin, Texas
				Stadium: Parmer Field; Attendance: Closed to the public

February 28	San Antonio FC	v	Corpus Christi FC	San Antonio, Texas
				Stadium: Toyota Field; Attendance: Closed to the public

March 4	Corpus Christi FC	v	Laredo Heat	Corpus Christi, Texas
				Stadium: Corpus Christi Sports Complex; Attendance: Closed to the public

March 7	Corpus Christi FC	v	SMU Mustangs	Corpus Christi, Texas
				Stadium: Corpus Christi Sports Complex; Attendance: Closed to the public

== Competitive fixtures ==
=== Regular Season ===
March 14 1	FC Naples	2–2	Corpus Christi FC	Naples, Florida
6:00 PM CST	Torrellas 2'; Cisneros (yellow card) 37'; Bachstein 88' (yellow card) 90'	Report	Kwakwa (yellow card) 20'; Pondeca 43'; Abeal (yellow card) 56'; Langlois (yellow card) 78'; Keaney (yellow card) 86'; Medina 90+2'	Stadium: Paradise Coast Sports Complex; Attendance: 3,665; Referee: Alejo Calume

March 24 2	One Knoxville SC	0–0	Corpus Christi FC	Knoxville, Tennessee
6:00 PM CST	Murphy (yellow card) 19'; Fuller (yellow card) 45+2'; Brown (yellow card) 86'	Report	Abeal (yellow card) 22'; Infuso (yellow card) 35'; Roscoe (yellow card) 65'; Dietrich (yellow card) 86'	Stadium: Covenant Health Park; Attendance: 1,811; Referee: Jorge Escobar

March 28 3	Union Omaha	2–1	Corpus Christi FC	Omaha, Nebraska
4:00 PM CST	Knapp 17'; Wootton (yellow card) 87'; Owusu 90+3'	Report	Roscoe (yellow card) 73'; Medina 83'; Kwakwa (yellow card) 89'	Stadium: Morrison Stadium; Attendance: 1,774; Referee: Igor Bych

April 4 4	Westchester SC	5–1	Corpus Christi FC	Mount Vernon, New York
6:00 PM CST	McGlynn 16' (pen.), 65'; Jiménez 18'; Jennings (yellow card) 34'; Dickerson (yellow card) 60'; Mackic 77'; Guezen 81'	Report	Gomez (yellow card) 32'; Kwakwa 45+5'; Pondeca (yellow card) 84'; Keaney (red card) 90+3'	Stadium: The Stadium at Memorial Field; Attendance: 1,326; Referee: Luis Arroyo

April 22 5	Sarasota Paradise	2–1	Corpus Christi FC	Lakewood Ranch, Florida
5:30 PM CST	Pettersen (yellow card) 35'; Rosa 42' (yellow card) 90+1'; Røed 64'	Report	Cerritos (yellow card) 25'; Kwakwa (yellow card) 45'; Roscoe (yellow card) 74'; Bowen 80'; Chaney (yellow card) 89'	Stadium: Premier Sports Campus; Attendance: 1,406; Referee: Richonne Clark

May 2 6	Corpus Christi FC	0–0	Spokane Velocity	Corpus Christi, Texas
7:30 PM CST	Chaney (yellow card) 37'; Dietrich (yellow card) 59'	Report	Veidman (yellow card) 31'	Stadium: Cabaniss Athletic Complex; Attendance: 750; Referee: Servando Berna Rico

May 9 7	Corpus Christi FC	1–3	Charlotte Independence	Corpus Christi, Texas
7:30 PM CST	Abeal (yellow card) 22'; Langlois 35'; Chaney (yellow card) 58'; Zayed (yellow card) 64'; Dietrich (red card) 70'	Report	Martínez 15'; Amaya (yellow card) 21' (goal) 40'; Skinner (yellow card) 59'; Romero (yellow card) 67'; Álvarez 722' (pen.); Levy (yellow card) 80'	Stadium: Cabaniss Athletic Complex; Attendance: 547; Referee: Robert Vincze

May 20 8	Fort Wayne FC	1–1	Corpus Christi FC	Fort Wayne, Indiana
6:30 PM CST	Solis (yellow card) 19'; Nieto (yellow card) 39'; Rempel (yellow card) 46'; Dias 50'; Garay (yellow card) 85'	Report	Medina (yellow card) 9' (yellow-red card) 72'; Abeal (yellow card) 30'; Cerritos 63'; Roscoe (yellow card) 90+2'	Stadium: Ruoff Mortgage Stadium; Attendance: 2,399; Referee: Amin Hadzic

May 23 9	Corpus Christi FC	2–2	One Knoxville SC	Corpus Christi, Texas
7:30 PM CST	Keaney (yellow card) 19'; Booth (yellow card) 28'; Zayed (yellow card) 28'; Dietrich (yellow card) 39'; Bowen 42', 69'; Gomez (yellow card) 54'	Report	Skelton (yellow card) 25'; Gøling (yellow card) 39' (red card) 48'; Rodrigues 55'; Tiao (yellow card) 79'; Erb 90+7'	Stadium: Cabaniss Athletic Complex; Attendance: 1,075; Referee: Deny Kulasinac

May 29 10	Forward Madison FC	3–0	Corpus Christi FC	Madison, Wisconsin
6:00 PM CT	Gyamfi 8'; Gebhard 22'; Shannon (yellow card) 31'; Ngoubou 73'; Castro (yellow card) 90+1'	Report	Roscoe (yellow card) 40'; Kwakwa (yellow card) 81'; Keaney (yellow card) 87'	Stadium: Breese Stevens Field; Attendance: 3,963; Referee: Laadi Issaka

June 3 11	Corpus Christi FC	3–2	Portland Hearts of Pine	Corpus Christi, Texas
7:30 PM CST	Bowen (yellow card) 30' (goal) 52'; Zayed (yellow card) 45+5'; Abeal (yellow card) 47'; Keegan (yellow card) 58'; Keaney (yellow card) 64'; Medina (yellow card) 90'; Morse 90+5' (o.g.); Roscoe 90+8'	Report	Green (yellow card) 35'; Evans 45+1'; Kamara 85'; Morse (yellow card) 90+3'; Mohamed (yellow card) 90+7'	Stadium: Cabaniss Athletic Complex; Attendance: 268; Referee: Atahan Yaya

June 13 12	Corpus Christi FC	1–0	Richmond Kickers	Corpus Christi, Texas
7:30 PM CST	Bowen (yellow card) 46'; Kwakwa (yellow card) 54'; Medina 73'; Talbot (yellow card) 90+3'	Report	Dourado (yellow card) 80'	Stadium: Cabaniss Athletic Complex; Attendance: 1,628; Referee: Muhammad Kaleia

June 20 13	Corpus Christi FC	4–1	Sarasota Paradise	Corpus Christi, Texas
7:30 PM CST	Gomez (yellow card) 23'; Keegan 25', 33'; Keaney (yellow card) 37'; Kwakwa 62'; Cerritos (yellow card) 68'; Talbot (yellow card) 88'; Langlois (yellow card) 90+2'; Thomas 90+3'	Report	Walker (yellow card) 2' (goal) 53' (pen.); Rosa (yellow card) 84'	Stadium: Cabaniss Athletic Complex; Attendance: 1,937; Referee: John Matto

June 24 14	Corpus Christi FC	0–0	AV Alta FC	Corpus Christi, Texas
7:30 PM CST	Keegan (yellow card) 29'	Report	Relerford (yellow card) 24'; Anderson (yellow card) 46'; Kwakwa (yellow card) 55'; Aoumaich (yellow card) 85'	Stadium: Cabaniss Athletic Complex; Attendance: 1,332; Referee: Elton García

July 1 15	Charlotte Independence	2–1	Corpus Christi FC	Matthews, North Carolina
6:00 PM CST	Amaya (yellow card) 9'; Bakero 41'; Romero 45+5' (yellow card) 54'	Report	Bowen 6' (pen.) (yellow card) 45+7'; Dietrich (yellow card) 25'; Langlois (yellow card) 70'; Zayed (yellow card) 90+1'	Stadium: Sportsplex at Matthews; Attendance: 573; Referee: Esad Omanovic

July 4 16	Corpus Christi FC	2–1	Chattanooga Red Wolves SC	Corpus Christi, Texas
6:30 PM CST	Keegan 4'; Zayed (yellow card) 45+6'; Medina (yellow card) 65'; Roscoe (yellow card) 78'; Bowen 81'; Kwakwa (yellow card) 89'; Talbot (yellow card) 90+5'	Report	Acosta (yellow card) 22'; Kelly 26'; Engmann (yellow card) 90+4'	Stadium: Cabaniss Athletic Complex; Attendance: 1,322; Referee: José Lara

July 18 17	New York Cosmos	0–0	Corpus Christi FC	Paterson, New Jersey
6:00 PM CST	Marsh (yellow card) 20'	Report	Abeal (yellow card) 4'; Medina (yellow card) 61'; Zayed (yellow card) 70'	Stadium: Hinchliffe Stadium; Attendance: 1,037; Referee: Kyle Johnston

July 25 18	Corpus Christi FC	1–0	Greenville Triumph SC	Corpus Christi, Texas
7:30 PM CST	Medina 10' (yellow card) 30'; Zayed (yellow card) 48'; Kwakwa (yellow card) 77'; Keaney (yellow card) 90+8'	Report	Herrera (yellow card) 81'; White (yellow card) 87'; Fricke (yellow card) 88'; Liadi (yellow card) 90+8'	Stadium: Cabaniss Athletic Complex; Attendance: 1,447; Referee: Steven Cardoso

August 1 19	Athletic Club Boise	0–0	Corpus Christi FC	Garden City, Idaho
8:30 PM CST	Mayaka (yellow card) 37'; Miller (yellow card) 64'	Report	Keaney (yellow card) 13'; Talbot (yellow card) 15'; Bowen (yellow card) 21'; McCready (yellow card) 45+1'; Roscoe (yellow card) 65'; Dietrich (yellow card) 90+4'	Stadium: Stadium at Expo Idaho; Attendance: 7,204; Referee: Christopher Calderon

August 8 20	Portland Hearts of Pine	0–2	Corpus Christi FC	Portland, Maine
6:44 PM CST	Barbosa (yellow card) 33'; Espinosa (yellow card) 85'; Varela (yellow card) 90+6'	Report	Bowen 19' (yellow card) 37'; Abeal (yellow card) 59'; Medina (yellow card) 72'; Keaney 84'; Dietrich (yellow card) 90+5'	Stadium: Fitzpatrick Stadium; Attendance: 6,289; Referee: Jorge Escobar
Note: match was delayed 44 minutes due to rain and weather.

August 15 21	Spokane Velocity	2–3	Corpus Christi FC	Spokane, Washington
8:30 PM CST	Brett 11'; Spielman (yellow card) 48'; Veidman (yellow card) 59'; Fernandez (yellow card) 65'; Vinyals 70' (yellow card) 90'	Report	Keaney 57'; Abeal (yellow card) 72'; Medina 81'; Cerritos (yellow card) 89'; Keegan 90+6' (yellow card) 90+6'	Stadium: ONE Spokane Stadium; Attendance: 1,231; Referee: Dion Coxe-Trieger

August 19 22	Corpus Christi FC	0–2	New York Cosmos	Corpus Christi, Texas
7:30 PM CST	Zayed (yellow card) 41'; Gomez (yellow card) 59'; Roscoe (yellow card) 89'	Report	Jawneh (yellow card) 9' (goal) 25'; Spengler 76'; Sidoel (yellow card) 89'; Stephani (yellow card) 90+2'; Chavez (yellow card) 90+4'	Stadium: Cabaniss Athletic Complex; Attendance: 1,150; Referee: Jay Schlesinger

August 22 23	Corpus Christi FC	2–2	Westchester SC	Corpus Christi, Texas
7:30 PM CST	Kwakwa (yellow card) 21'; Medina (yellow card) 22'; Talbot (yellow card) 22'; Keegan 57'; Zayed (yellow card) 82' (yellow-red card) 90'; Keaney 89'	Report	Timchenko 23'; Elias (yellow card) 26'; Guezen 37'; Bouman (yellow card) 79'	Stadium: Cabaniss Athletic Complex; Attendance: 2,360; Referee: Anthony Almeida

September 2 24	Corpus Christi FC	v	South Georgia Tormenta FC	Corpus Christi, Texas
7:30 PM CST				Stadium: Cabaniss Athletic Complex
Note: Game cancelled following South Georgia Tormenta FC's withdrawal from USL League One.

September 5 25	Corpus Christi FC	0–2	Forward Madison FC	Corpus Christi, Texas
7:30 PM CST	Booth (yellow card) 53'; Johnson (yellow card) 64'; Keaney (yellow card) 66'; Keegan (yellow card) 90+1'; Gomez (red card) 90+6'	Report	Torres (yellow card) 1'; Edwards (yellow card) 23'; Ngoubou 61'; Carmichael 67' (pen.); Goumballe (yellow card) 80'	Stadium: Cabaniss Athletic Complex; Attendance: 1,159; Referee: Edgar Garcia

September 12 26	Corpus Christi FC	1–2	Union Omaha	Corpus Christi, Texas
7:30 PM CST	Roscoe (yellow card) 38'; Bachstein 82'; Keaney (yellow card) 90+7'	Report	Kallman (red card) 4'; Gutiérrez 37' (yellow card) 56'; Ors 87'	Stadium: Cabaniss Athletic Complex; Attendance: 1,608; Referee: Joe Surgan

September 16 27	Greenville Triumph SC	0–1	Corpus Christi FC	Mauldin, South Carolina
10:00 AM CST	Bubb (yellow card) 10'; Fricke (yellow card) 12'; Liadi (yellow card) 85'; Herrera (red card) 90'; Robles (yellow card) 90+4'	Report	Medina (yellow card) 20' (yellow-red card) 79'; Bowen (yellow card) 30'; Bachstein 36'; Vasic (yellow card) 64'; Johnson (yellow card) 90+3'	Stadium: GE Vernova Park; Attendance: 4,383; Referee: Alejo Calume

September 19 28	South Georgia Tormenta FC	v	Corpus Christi FC	Statesboro, Georgia
5:30 PM CST				Stadium: Tormenta Stadium
Note: Game cancelled following South Georgia Tormenta FC's withdrawal from USL League One.

September 26 29	Corpus Christi FC	2–1	Athletic Club Boise	Corpus Christi, Texas
7:30 PM CST	Bowen 22'; Roscoe (yellow card) 60'; Vasic (yellow card) 83'; Barganski (yellow card) 90+3'; Keaney 90+7'	Report	Barea (yellow card) 57'; Mayaka (yellow card) 58'; Amang 63'; Yehya (yellow card) 90+1'	Stadium: Cabaniss Athletic Complex; Attendance: 1,699; Referee: Igor Bych

October 3 30	Chattanooga Red Wolves SC	3–0	Corpus Christi FC	East Ridge, Tennessee
2:00 PM CST	Kinzner (yellow card) 1' (yellow-red card) 76'; MacKenzie (yellow card) 7'; Lombardi (yellow card) 25'; P. Hernández 27'; Clapier (yellow card) 45+3'; Gómez 45+10'; Hernandez 90+3'	Report	Langlois (yellow card) 46'	Stadium: CHI Memorial Stadium; Attendance: 2,135; Referee: John Griggs

October 7 31	Corpus Christi FC	1–3	Fort Wayne FC	Corpus Christi, Texas
7:30 PM CST	Zayed (yellow card) 45+5'; Gomez (yellow card) 79'; Vasic (yellow card) 81'; Johnson 83'; Bowen (yellow card) 88'	Report	Vukovic (yellow card) 27'; Armas 33'; Gafar 37'; Becher (yellow card) 45+3'; Schipmann (yellow card) 69'; Dias 79'; Nieto (yellow card) 90+6'	Stadium: Cabaniss Athletic Complex; Attendance: 1,678; Referee: Servando Berna Rico

October 10 32	Corpus Christi FC	0–1	FC Naples	Corpus Christi, Texas
7:30 PM CST	Bowen (yellow card) 66'; Roscoe (yellow card) 85'	Report	Collins 24'; Garcia (yellow card) 33'; Ferrín (yellow card) 90+3'	Stadium: Cabaniss Athletic Complex; Attendance: 2,830; Referee: Ivan de Cristofaro

October 17 33	Richmond Kickers	5–1	Corpus Christi FC	Richmond, Virginia
5:00 PM CST	Pannholzer 45+5' (pen.), 52', 61'; Dourado 51'; O'Malley 74' (yellow card) 79'	Report	Keegan 7'; Keaney (yellow card) 45+4'; Zayed (yellow card) 45+6'	Stadium: City Stadium; Attendance: 3,952; Referee: John Tamayo

October 24 34	AV Alta FC	2–2	Corpus Christi FC	Lancaster, California
10:30 PM CST	Anderson 8'; A. Aoumaich 42'; Pehlivanov (yellow card) 69'	Report	Keegan 13'; Pondeca (yellow card) 56'; Abeal 85'	Stadium: Lancaster Municipal Stadium; Attendance: 5,024; Referee: Trevor Wiseman

=== USL Cup ===
April 25 Group Stage	Chattanooga Red Wolves SC	0–1	Corpus Christi FC	East Ridge, Tennessee
6:00 PM CDT	Hernández (yellow card) 9'; Adewole (yellow card) 43'; Wessels (yellow card) 57'	Report	Bowen 7'; Medina (yellow card) 12'; McCready (yellow card) 90+2'; Keaney (yellow card) 90+3'	Stadium: CHI Memorial Stadium; Attendance: 1,278; Referee: Drew Klemp

May 16 Group Stage	Corpus Christi FC	0–1	FC Tulsa	Corpus Christi, Texas
7:30 PM CST	Abeal (yellow card) 45+1'; Keaney (yellow card) 45+2'; Dietrich (yellow card) 90'; Roscoe (yellow card) 90+5'; Barganski (yellow card) 90+7'; Zayed (yellow card) 90+9'	Report	Colli (yellow card) 25'; Lapa (yellow card) 26'; Cabral (yellow card) 75' (goal) 80'; Pierre (yellow card) 77'; Ian (yellow card) 90'; Robinson (yellow card) 90+4'	Stadium: Cabaniss Athletic Complex; Attendance: 615; Referee: Mark Verso

June 6 Group Stage	Birmingham Legion	3–0	Corpus Christi FC	Birmingham, Alabama
7:00 PM CST	Saucedo 9' (pen.); Williams 12'; Tregarthen 72' (yellow card) 82'	Report	Infuso (yellow card) 37'; Dietrich (yellow card) 43'; Zayed (yellow card) 44'; Medina (yellow card) 52'; Cerritos (yellow card) 59'	Stadium: Protective Stadium; Attendance: 2,565; Referee: Muhammad Hassan

July 11 Group Stage	Corpus Christi FC	1–1 (2–4 p)	One Knoxville SC	Corpus Christi, Texas
7:30 PM CST	Pondeca 78' (yellow card) 78'	Report	Zarokostas (yellow card) 35'; Burke (yellow card) 66'; Fuller (yellow card) 79'; Murphy (yellow card) 80'; Rosamilia 90+4'	Stadium: Corpus Christi Sports Complex; Attendance: 1,128; Referee: Cristian Campo Hernandez
	Penalties
	Bowen (penalty missed); Kearney (penalty scored); Keegan (penalty scored); Pondeca (penalty missed)		(penalty scored) Krioutchenkov; (penalty scored) Fernández; (penalty scored) Linhares; (penalty scored) Rosamilia

=== Appearances and goals ===
No.	Pos	Nat	Player	Total		USL League One		USL Cup		USL League One Playoffs	
No.	Pos	Nat	Player	Apps	Goals	Apps	Goals	Apps	Goals	Apps	Goals
1	GK	(Republic of Ireland) IRL	James Talbot	23	0	22+0	0	1+0	0	0+0	0
2	DF	(United States) USA	Blake Bowen	35	9	30+1	8	3+1	1	0+0	0
3	DF	(Argentina) ARG	Tomás Ritondale	10	0	4+3	0	3+0	0	0+0	0
4	MF	(Republic of Ireland) IRL	Jack Keaney	34	4	30+0	4	4+0	0	0+0	0
5	DF	(England) ENG	Sam Roscoe	33	1	30+0	1	3+0	0	0+0	0
6	DF	(United States) USA	Patrick Langlois	34	1	31+0	1	3+0	0	0+0	0
7	MF	(Trinidad and Tobago) TTO	Kaihim Thomas	17	1	6+9	1	2+0	0	0+0	0
8	MF	(Germany) GER	Jackson Dietrich	21	0	13+5	0	2+1	0	0+0	0
9	FW	(United States) USA	Christian Chaney	7	0	4+2	0	1+0	0	0+0	0
10	FW	(El Salvador) ESA	Alexis Cerritos	24	1	6+14	1	2+2	0	0+0	0
11	FW	(Colombia) COL	Leyder Robledo	1	0	0+1	0	0+0	0	0+0	0
11	FW	(United States) USA	EJ Johnson	8	1	2+6	1	0+0	0	0+0	0
12	FW	(United States) USA	Jake Keegan	36	7	24+8	7	1+3	0	0+0	0
14	MF	(United States) USA	Parker Vasic	8	0	6+2	0	0+0	0	0+0	0
15	MF	(United States) USA	James Parks	3	0	0+2	0	0+1	0	0+0	0
17	FW	(United States) USA	Manzi Shalita	10	0	0+7	0	2+1	0	0+0	0
18	FW	(United States) USA	Dominick Bachstein	11	2	5+6	2	0+0	0	0+0	0
19	MF	(United States) USA	Kyle Barganski	10	0	3+4	0	0+3	0	0+0	0
20	DF	(United States) USA	Pierce Infuso	14	0	6+4	0	3+1	0	0+0	0
21	FW	(Spain) ESP	Nacho Abeal	35	1	20+12	1	1+2	0	0+0	0
22	MF	(Trinidad and Tobago) TTO	Shannon Gomez	34	0	30+1	0	2+1	0	0+0	0
24	GK	(Scotland) SCO	Mason McCready	11	0	9+0	0	2+0	0	0+0	0
26	MF	(United States) USA	Bubu Medina	34	5	27+3	5	3+1	0	0+0	0
27	MF	(United States) USA	Tomas Pondeca	25	2	16+8	1	1+0	1	0+0	0
30	MF	(Philippines) PHI	Javier Mariona	3	0	0+2	0	1+0	0	0+0	0
33	MF	(Ghana) GHA	Enock Kwakwa	22	2	15+5	2	1+1	0	0+0	0
35	GK	(United States) USA	Logan Erb	3	0	2+0	0	1+0	0	0+0	0
80	MF	(Jamaica) JAM	Andrew Booth	16	0	11+3	0	2+0	0	0+0	0

=== Top Goalscorers ===
Rank	Position	Number	Name	USL1 Season	USL Cup	USL League One Playoffs	Total
1	DF	2	(United States) Blake Bowen	8	1	0	9
2	FW	12	(United States) Jake Keegan	7	0	0	7
3	MF	26	(United States) Bubu Medina	5	0	0	5
4	MF	4	(Republic of Ireland) Jack Keaney	4	0	0	4
5	FW	18	(United States) Dominick Bachstein	2	0	0	2
5	MF	27	(Ghana) Enock Kwakwa	2	0	0	2
5	MF	27	(United States) Tomas Pondeca	1	1	0	2
7	DF	5	(England) Sam Roscoe	1	0	0	1
7	DF	6	(United States) Patrick Langlois	1	0	0	1
7	MF	7	(Trinidad and Tobago) Kaihim Thomas	1	0	0	1
7	FW	10	(El Salvador) Alexis Cerritos	1	0	0	1
7	FW	11	(United States) EJ Johnson	1	0	0	1
7	FW	21	(Spain) Nacho Abeal	1	0	0	1
7	NA	NA	Own Goals	1	0	0	1
Total				36	2	0	38

=== Assist scorers ===
Rank	Position	Number	Name	USL1 Season	USL Cup	USL League One Playoffs	Total
1	DF	2	(United States) Blake Bowen	9	0	0	9
2	FW	20	(Spain) Nacho Abeal	6	0	0	6
3	MF	8	(Germany) Jackson Dietrich	2	1	0	3
4	FW	10	(El Salvador) Alexis Cerritos	2	0	0	2
5	DF	3	(Argentina) Tomás Ritondale	1	0	0	1
5	MF	4	(Republic of Ireland) Jack Keaney	1	0	0	1
5	DF	6	(United States) Patrick Langlois	1	0	0	1
5	FW	12	(United States) Jake Keegan	1	0	0	1
5	MF	26	(United States) Bubu Medina	1	0	0	1
5	MF	27	(United States) Tomas Pondeca	1	0	0	1
5	MF	30	(Philippines) Javier Mariona	1	0	0	1
5	MF	33	(Ghana) Enock Kwakwa	1	0	0	1
5	MF	80	(Jamaica) Andrew Booth	1	0	0	1
5	MF	15	(United States) James Parks	0	1	0	1
Total				28	2	0	30

=== Clean sheets ===
Rank	Name	USL1 Season	USL Cup	USL League One Playoffs	Total
1	(Republic of Ireland) Jack Talbot	7	0	0	7
2	(Scotland) Mason McCready	1	1	0	2
Total		8	1	0	9

=== Disciplinary record ===
No.	Pos.	Player	USL League One Regular Season			USL Cup			USL League One Playoffs			Total		
No.	Pos.	Player	Yellow card	(yellow card) (yellow-red card)	Red card	Yellow card	(yellow card) (yellow-red card)	Red card	Yellow card	(yellow card) (yellow-red card)	Red card	Yellow card	(yellow card) (yellow-red card)	Red card
1	GK	(Republic of Ireland) James Talbot	5	0	0	0	0	0	0	0	0	5	0	0
2	DF	(United States) Blake Bowen	8	0	0	0	0	0	0	0	0	8	0	0
3	DF	(Argentina) Tomás Ritondale	0	0	0	0	0	0	0	0	0	0	0	0
4	MF	(Republic of Ireland) Jack Keaney	10	0	1	2	0	0	0	0	0	12	0	1
5	DF	(England) Sam Roscoe	11	0	0	1	0	0	0	0	0	12	0	0
6	DF	(United States) Patrick Langlois	4	0	0	0	0	0	0	0	0	4	0	0
7	MF	(Trinidad and Tobago) Kaihim Thomas	0	0	0	0	0	0	0	0	0	0	0	0
8	MF	(Germany) Jackson Dietrich	6	0	1	2	0	0	0	0	0	8	0	1
9	FW	(United States) Christian Chaney	3	0	0	0	0	0	0	0	0	3	0	0
10	FW	(El Salvador) Alexis Cerritos	3	0	0	1	0	0	0	0	0	4	0	0
11	FW	(Colombia) Leyder Robledo	0	0	0	0	0	0	0	0	0	0	0	0
11	FW	(United States) EJ Johnson	2	0	0	0	0	0	0	0	0	2	0	0
12	FW	(United States) Jake Keegan	4	0	0	0	0	0	0	0	0	4	0	0
14	MF	(United States) Parker Vasic	3	0	0	0	0	0	0	0	0	3	0	0
15	MF	(United States) Sam Parks	0	0	0	0	0	0	0	0	0	0	0	0
17	FW	(United States) Manzi Shalita	0	0	0	0	0	0	0	0	0	0	0	0
19	MF	(United States) Kyle Barganski	1	0	0	1	0	0	0	0	0	2	0	0
20	DF	(United States) Pierce Infuso	1	0	0	1	0	0	0	0	0	2	0	0
21	FW	(Spain) Nacho Abeal	8	0	0	1	0	0	0	0	0	9	0	0
22	MF	(Trinidad and Tobago) Shannon Gomez	5	0	1	0	0	0	0	0	0	5	0	1
24	GK	(Scotland) Mason McCready	1	0	0	1	0	0	0	0	0	2	0	0
26	MF	(United States) Bubu Medina	6	2	0	2	0	0	0	0	0	8	2	0
27	MF	(United States) Tomas Pondeca	1	0	0	1	0	0	0	0	0	2	0	0
33	MF	(Ghana) Enock Kwakwa	9	0	0	0	0	0	0	0	0	9	0	0
80	MF	(Jamaica) Andrew Booth	2	0	0	0	0	0	0	0	0	2	0	0
	Head Coach	(Libya) Éamon Zayed	11	1	0	2	0	0	0	0	0	13	1	0
Total			104	3	3	15	0	0	0	0	0	119	3	3

== Honors and awards ==
=== Weekly Awards ===
==== USL League One Team of the Week ====
Week	Player	Opponent	Position	Ref
2	(United States) Tomas Pondeca	FC Naples	MF	
4	(Republic of Ireland) James Talbot	One Knoxville SC	Bench	
5	(Ghana) Enock Kwakwa	Westchester SC	MF	
8/9	(Republic of Ireland) James Talbot	Spokane Velocity	GK	
8/9	(United States) Blake Bowen	Spokane Velocity	Bench	
11/12	(United States) Blake Bowen	One Knoxville SC	MF	
14/15	(United States) Bubu Medina	Richmond Kickers	MF	
16	(Spain) Nacho Abeal	Sarasota Paradise	FW	
16	(United States) Jake Keegan	Sarasota Paradise	FW	
16	(Ghana) Enock Kwakwa	Sarasota Paradise	Bench	
17/18	(United States) Blake Bowen	Charlotte Independence and Chattanooga Red Wolves SC	Bench	
21	(United States) Bubu Medina	Greenville Triumph SC	MF	
22	(Republic of Ireland) James Talbot	Athletic Club Boise	GK	
23	(Republic of Ireland) Jack Keaney	Portland Hearts of Pine	DF	
23	(United States) Blake Bowen	Portland Hearts of Pine	FW	
23	(Libya) Éamon Zayed	Portland Hearts of Pine	Head Coach	
23	(Trinidad and Tobago) Shannon Gomez	Portland Hearts of Pine	Bench	
24	(Republic of Ireland) Jack Keaney	Spokane Velocity	DF	
24	(Libya) Éamon Zayed	Spokane Velocity	Head Coach	
30	(United States) Blake Bowen	Athletic Club Boise	Bench	

=== Prinx Tires USL Cup Team of the Round ===
Week	Player	Opponent	Position	Ref
1	(United States) Blake Bowen	Chattanooga Red Wolves SC	DF	
