= 2026 Greenville Triumph SC season =

Greenville Triumph SC
2026 season
- Owner: Joe Erwin; William M. Webster
- Head coach: Dave Dixon
- Stadium: Stone Stadium; Riggs Field; GE Vernova Park
- U.S. Open Cup: First round
- Top goalscorer: League: Azaad Liadi; Rodrigo Robles; (2 goals each); All: Devin Boyce; Azaad Liadi; Rodrigo Robles; (2 goals each)
- Average home league attendance: 1,859
- Biggest win: GVL 4–0 FCN (August 29, USL1)
- Biggest defeat: SAR 6–0 GVL (September 19, USL1)

The 2026 Greenville Triumph SC season was the eighth season in the history of Greenville Triumph SC, who compete in USL League One (USL1) in the third tier of American soccer. Based in Greenville, South Carolina, the team is splitting early-season home fixtures between Stone Stadium in Greenville and Riggs Field in Clemson before the opening of their new permanent home stadium, GE Vernova Park. The club is led by first-year head coach Dave Dixon.

== Competitions ==
=== USL League One ===
Pos	Team	Pld	W	L	T	GF	GA	GD	Pts
13	AV Alta FC	32	8	14	10	40	48	−8	34
14	Portland Hearts of Pine	32	8	14	10	48	58	−10	34
15	Greenville Triumph SC	32	8	18	6	37	60	−23	30
16	New York Cosmos	32	7	19	6	40	66	−26	27
17	Richmond Kickers	32	7	20	5	37	65	−28	26

Source: USL League One
Rules for classification: 1) points; 2) total wins; 3) total goal differential; 4) total goals scored; 5) points earned against top four finishers; 6) disciplinary points; 7) drawing of lots.

==== Fixtures and results ====
March 14, 2026 1	Greenville Triumph SC	1–2	Chattanooga Red Wolves SC	Greenville, South Carolina
7:00 p.m. EDT	Boyce 10'	Report	Hernández 37'; Mercer 58'	Stadium: Stone Stadium; Attendance: 2,122; Referee: John Griggs

March 25, 2026 2	Greenville Triumph SC	3–2	New York Cosmos	Greenville, South Carolina
7:00 p.m. EDT	Fricke 3'; Chavez 57' (o.g.); Robles 62'	Report	Spengler 25'; Mendonca 77'	Stadium: Stone Stadium; Attendance: 1,756; Referee: Stefan Perri

March 29, 2026 3	Greenville Triumph SC	4–2	Westchester SC	Greenville, South Carolina
7:00 p.m. EDT	Liadi 22', 59'; Robles 33'; Beckford 41'	Report	Mačkić 63'; McGlynn 68'	Stadium: Stone Stadium; Attendance: 1,698; Referee: Mario Maric

April 5 4	FC Naples	1–0	Greenville Triumph SC	Naples, Florida
7:00 PM EDT	Strumier (yellow card) 5'; Ferrín 18'; Poland (yellow card) 61'; Gay (yellow card) 72'; Miglietti (yellow card) 81'; Delgado (yellow card) 89'	Report	Beckford (yellow card) 41'	Stadium: Paradise Coast Sports Complex; Attendance: 2,749; Referee: Richonne Clark

May 2, 2026 5	Union Omaha	2–0	Greenville Triumph SC	Omaha, Nebraska
7:00 p.m. CDT	Tekiela 53'; Gutierrez 90+2'			Stadium: Morrison Stadium; Attendance: 2,281; Referee: Joe Surgan

May 23, 2026 6	Portland Hearts of Pine	1–1	Greenville Triumph SC	Portland, Maine
6:30 p.m. EDT	Wright 78' (pen.)		Robles 70'; Patti (red card) 76'	Stadium: Fitzpatrick Stadium; Attendance: 6,292; Referee: Edson Carvajal

May 29, 2026 7	One Knoxville SC	2–0	Greenville Triumph SC	Knoxville, Tennessee
6:30 p.m. EDT	Seagrist 48' (o.g.); Rodrigues 81'			Stadium: Covenant Health Park; Attendance: 4,463; Referee: Amin Hadzic

June 3, 2026 8	Greenville Triumph SC	1–0	Forward Madison FC	Mauldin, South Carolina
7:00 PM EDT	Liadi 14' (Boyce), (yellow card) 56'; Seagrist (yellow card) 44'; Boyce (yellow card) 45+2'; Herrera (yellow card) 79'	Report	Toure (yellow card) 83'; Segbers (yellow card) 89'; K. Carmichael (yellow card) 90+2'	Stadium: GE Vernova Park; Attendance: 4,252; Referee: Benjamin Meyer

June 14 9	Westchester SC	4–0	Greenville Triumph SC	Mount Vernon, New York
7:00 PM EDT	Diaz 15'; Jennings 32'; Evans (yellow card) 42'; McGlynn 45+5' (pen.); Armas (yellow card) 74'; Burko 90+2'	Report	Knight (red card) 45+1'; Fricke (yellow card) 57'	Stadium: The Stadium at Memorial Field; Attendance: 1,613; Referee: Joshua Encarnación

June 20 10	Greenville Triumph SC	1–2	AV Alta FC	Mauldin, South Carolina
3:00 PM PT	Patti (yellow card) 3'; Dixon (yellow card) 22' (red card) 90+7'; Fricke 38'; Evans (yellow card) 66'	Report	C. Ortiz 72'; Bahena 87'	Stadium: GE Vernova Park; Attendance: 3,365; Referee: Muhammad Kaleia

July 4 11	New York Cosmos	0–3	Greenville Triumph SC	Paterson, New Jersey
7:00 PM EDT	Milovanov (yellow card) 78'; Guenzatti (yellow card) 79'	Report	Herrera (yellow card) 17'; Fricke 45+7'; Akio (yellow card) 55' (goal) 57', 64'	Stadium: Hinchliffe Stadium; Attendance: 968; Referee: Muhammad Hassan

July 8 12	Greenville Triumph SC	0–0	Sarasota Paradise	Mauldin, South Carolina
7:00 PM ET	Robles (yellow card) 83'; Agyaakwah (yellow card) 85'	Report	Linderoth (yellow card) 53'	Stadium: GE Vernova Park; Attendance: 2,205; Referee: Muhammad Kaleia

July 11, 2026 13	Greenville Triumph SC	1–2	Richmond Kickers	Greenville, South Carolina
7:00 p.m. EDT	Meek 50'; Meek (yellow card) 27'; Agyaakwah (yellow card) 52'; White (yellow card) 53'		Bubb (o.g.) 60'; Howell 80'; Vinberg (yellow card) 22'; Richman (yellow card) 43'; Maruna (yellow card) 73'; Anderson (yellow card) 87'	Stadium: GE Vernova Park; Attendance: 2,131; Referee: Daniel Emeri

July 18 14	Fort Wayne FC	3–0	Greenville Triumph SC	Fort Wayne, Indiana
7:30 PM EDT	Becher 16'; Healy (yellow card) 23'; Nieto (yellow card) 34'; Ricol 35'; Gafar 57'	Report	Nour (yellow card) 15'; Meek (yellow card) 19'; Agyaakwah (yellow card) 90+3'	Stadium: Ruoff Mortgage Stadium; Attendance: 3,755; Referee: Atahan Yaya

July 25 15	Corpus Christi FC	1–0	Greenville Triumph SC	Corpus Christi, Texas
7:30 PM CST	Medina 10' (yellow card) 30'; Zayed (yellow card) 48'; Kwakwa (yellow card) 77'; Keaney (yellow card) 90+8'	Report	Herrera (yellow card) 81'; White (yellow card) 87'; Fricke (yellow card) 88'; Liadi (yellow card) 90+8'	Stadium: Cabaniss Athletic Complex; Attendance: 1,447; Referee: Steven Cardoso

July 29 16	Greenville Triumph SC	3–2	Athletic Club Boise	Mauldin, South Carolina
5:00 PM MST	Meek 13'; Evans 25' (yellow card) 89'; Liadi 61'; Herrera (yellow card) 90+5'	Report	Barea 5'; Kostyshyn 15'; Yehya (yellow card) 33'; Ndiaye (yellow card) 64'; Amang (yellow card) 88'	Stadium: GE Vernova Park; Attendance: 2,205; Referee: Izlen Peksenar

August 1 17	Greenville Triumph SC	3–3	Portland Hearts of Pine	Mauldin, South Carolina
7:00 PM ET	Nour 37', 51'; Akio (yellow card) 61'; Liadi 90+3'	Report	Camara 28'; Barbosa 32'; Georgallides 40'; Drack (yellow card) 45+1'	Stadium: GE Vernova Park; Attendance: 3,135; Referee: Erick Lezama

August 9 18	Charlotte Independence	1–0	Greenville Triumph SC	Charlotte, North Carolina
7:00 PM ET	Marou 62'; Alvarez (yellow card) 54'; Manin (yellow card) 92'		Liadi (yellow card) 59' (red card) 77'; Bubb (yellow card) 30'; Evans (yellow card) 47'; Fricke (yellow card) 74'; Herrera (yellow card) 89'; Robles (yellow card) 92'	Stadium: American Legion Memorial Stadium; Attendance: 617; Referee: Lauren Aldrich

August 12, 2026 19	Forward Madison FC	1–1	Greenville Triumph SC	Madison, Wisconsin
7:00 PM CDT	Karamoko 44' (Torres); Castro (yellow card) 57'	Report	Nour 27', (yellow card) 28'; Fricke (yellow card) 40'; Bubb (yellow card) 46'; Evans (yellow card) 74'	Stadium: Breese Stevens Field; Attendance: 3,805; Referee: Stephen Foster

August 16 20	Greenville Triumph SC	1–1	One Knoxville	Mauldin, South Carolina
7:00 PM ET	Nour 46'; Akio (yellow card) 33'; Lee (yellow card) 54'		Rosamilia 90+3'; Baker (yellow card) 70'; Williams (yellow card) 76'	Stadium: GE Vernova Park; Attendance: 2,604; Referee: Jorge Escobar

August 22 21	Spokane Velocity	2–1	Greenville Triumph SC	Spokane, Washington
6:00 PM PDT	Bubb 27' (o.g.); Opara 30'; Covi (yellow card) 73'; S. Lewis (yellow card) 81'; A. Lewis (yellow card) 90+4'; Miller (yellow card) 90+6'	Report	Seagrist (yellow card) 34'; Patti 55'	Stadium: One Spokane Stadium; Attendance: 1,155; Referee: Braeden Fray

August 29 22	Greenville Triumph SC	4–0	FC Naples	Mauldin, South Carolina
7:00 PM EDT	Boyce 24'; Liadi (yellow card) 41' (goal) 88'; Nour 53', 87'; Evans (yellow card) 83'	Report	Cisneros (yellow card) 72'; Gordon (yellow card) 90+5'	Stadium: GE Vernova Park; Attendance: 3,628; Referee: Izlen Peksenar

September 6 23	Chattanooga Red Wolves	3–1	Greenville Triumph SC	Chattanooga
7:00 PM EDT				Stadium: CHI Memorial Stadium; Attendance: 1,287; Referee: Deny Kulasinac

September 12 24	Greenville Triumph SC	1–3	Fort Wayne FC	Mauldin, South Carolina
7:00 PM EDT	Agyaakwah (yellow card) 15'; Fricke 34'; Liadi (yellow card) 41'; Villanueva (yellow card) 56'; Nour (yellow card) 74'	Report	Evans 4' (o.g.); Nieto (yellow card) 29'; Neidlinger (yellow card) 32'; Becher 42', 58'; Dias (yellow card) 66'	Stadium: GE Vernova Park; Attendance: 2,417; Referee: Mario Maric

September 16 25	Greenville Triumph SC	0–1	Corpus Christi FC	Mauldin, South Carolina
10:00 AM CST	Bubb (yellow card) 10'; Fricke (yellow card) 12'; Liadi (yellow card) 85'; Herrera (red card) 90'; Robles (yellow card) 90+4'	Report	Medina (yellow card) 20' (yellow-red card) 79'; Bowen (yellow card) 30'; Bachstein 36'; Vasic (yellow card) 64'; Johnson (yellow card) 90+3'	Stadium: GE Vernova Park; Attendance: 4,383; Referee: Alejo Calume

September 19 26	Sarasota Paradise	6–0	Greenville Triumph SC	Lakewood Ranch, Florida
8:18 PM EDT	Rosa 4'; Krueger 13'; Gall 42'; Røed 45+3', 59'; Watters (yellow card) 52'; Bolanos 54'	Report	Benton (yellow card) 90+5'	Stadium: Premier Sports Campus; Attendance: 1,715; Referee: Russell Miller
Note: match was delayed 48 minutes due to weather.

September 26, 2026 27	Greenville, SC	1-3	Union Omaha	Mauldin, South Carolina
				Stadium: GE Vernova Park; Attendance: 2,900; Referee: Ivan de Cristofaro

October 3 28	Athletic Club Boise	1–0	Greenville Triumph SC	Garden City, Idaho
7:00 PM MST	Yaro 11'; Miller (yellow card) 20' (yellow-red card) 21'; Barea (red card) 45+6'; Kliewer (yellow card) 55'; Ricketts (yellow card) 67'	Report	Robles (yellow card) 34'; Herrera (yellow card) 90+2'	Stadium: Stadium at Expo Idaho; Attendance: 7,219; Referee: Cristian Campo Hernández

October 10 29	AV Alta FC	2–2	Greenville Triumph SC	Lancaster, California
7:30 PM ET	Winum (yellow card) 38'; Bahena Jr. (yellow card) 45+5' (goal) 45+5'; Aoumaich 58'; Thomas (yellow card) 65'; Gonzalez (yellow card) 69'	Report	Liadi 4', 36' (yellow card) 74'; Agyaakwah (yellow card) 44'; Nour (yellow card) 45+3'; Sims (yellow card) 90+1'	Stadium: Lancaster Municipal Stadium; Attendance: 4,610; Referee: Steven Cardozo

October 14 30	Greenville Triumph SC	4–3	Spokane Velocity	Mauldin, South Carolina
4:00 PM PDT	Agyaakwah 4'; Speilman 10' (o.g.); Patti 51'; Sims (yellow card) 52'; Boyce 76'	Report	Elmasnaouy 31', 87' (yellow card) 90+7'; Gil 72' (pen.); Miller (yellow card) 75'	Stadium: GE Vernova Park; Attendance: 2,433; Referee: John Matto

October 18 31	Greenville Triumph SC	-	Charlotte Independence	Mauldin, South Carolina
4:00 PM PDT	Fricke (yellow card) 34'; Robles (yellow card) 43'		Marou 27', 75', 84'; Saydee (yellow card) 22'; Coulibaly (yellow card) 63'; Bakero (yellow card) 81'	Stadium: GE Vernova Park; Attendance: 4,360; Referee: Dorian Del Toro

October 24 32	Richmond Kickers	-	Greenville Triumph SC	Richmond, Virginia
4:00 PM PDT				Stadium: Richmond City Stadium

=== Lamar Hunt U.S. Open Cup ===
March 18, 2026 USOC1	Asheville City SC (USL2)	3–1	Greenville Triumph SC (USL1)	Asheville, North Carolina
6:30 p.m. EDT	Southern 13'; Bilow 82'; Fall 90+9'	Report	Boyce 19'	Stadium: Greenwood Field; Attendance: 500; Referee: Kevin Broadley

=== USL Cup ===
Pos	Lg	Team	Pld	W	PKW	PKL	L	GF	GA	GD	Pts	Qualification
1	USL1	Charlotte Independence	4	2	2	0	0	6	4	+2	10	Advance to knockout stage
2	USLC	Charleston Battery	4	2	1	1	0	8	3	+5	9	
3	USLC	Pittsburgh Riverhounds SC	4	2	0	2	0	6	1	+5	8	
4	USL1	Greenville Triumph SC	4	1	0	0	3	4	7	−3	3	
5	USLC	Loudoun United FC	4	1	0	0	3	4	7	−3	3	
6	USL1	Richmond Kickers	4	1	0	0	3	3	9	−6	3	

April 25, 2026 LC1	Pittsburgh Riverhounds SC	3–0	Greenville Triumph SC	Pittsburgh, Pennsylvania
7:00 p.m.	Amann 7', 62'; Viera 42'			Stadium: Highmark Stadium; Attendance: 3,989; Referee: Luis Arroyo

May 9, 2026 LC2	Greenville Triumph SC	0–3	Richmond Kickers	Clemson, South Carolina
7:00 p.m. EDT			Murana 32'; Pannholzer 70'; Johnson 78'	Stadium: Riggs Field; Attendance: 2,018; Referee: Kevin Broadley

May 15, 2026 LC3	Greenville Triumph SC	3–0	Loudoun United FC	Greenville, South Carolina
7:00 p.m.	Akio 43'; Evans 64'; Bouregy 85'		Murphy 90+3'	Stadium: GE Vernova Park; Attendance: 2,876; Referee: Kyle Johnston

June 24, 2026 LC4	Charlotte Independence	1–0	Greenville Triumph SC	Charlotte, North Carolina
7:30 p.m.	Manin 77'			Stadium: American Legion Memorial Stadium; Attendance: 713; Referee: Matthew Corrigan
