= 2021 Valour FC season =

Valour FC
2021 season
- President: Wade Miller
- Head coach: Phillip Dos Santos (from Sep 23); Rob Gale (until Sep 23)
- Stadium: IG Field
- Canadian Premier League: 5th
- Canadian Championship: Quarter-finals
- Top goalscorer: League: Moses Dyer (9 goals); All: Moses Dyer (9 goals)
Home colours	Away colours

The 2021 Valour FC season was the third season in the club's history, as well as the third season in Canadian Premier League history.

== Overview ==
Due to the COVID-19 pandemic, the 2021 Canadian Premier League season began in a bubble in Winnipeg, giving Valour FC home field advantage for the first 8 games of the season. During this time Valour started off strong, reaching the top of the table. Crucial to Valour's success in this stretch was the play of Haitian defender Andrew Jean-Baptiste. Loanee goalkeeper Jonathan Sirois also had a league record-breaking start to the season. However, after playing seven games Jean-Baptiste suffered a season-ending injury. After Jean-Baptiste was injured and the league left the bubble, Valour's season took a sharp downward turn, winning only one match in 10 games. This led to club's only ever head coach, Rob Gale, being fired, and he was replaced with Phillip Dos Santos. Under Dos Santos, the team managed to get some better results, and ahead of the last game of the season against bottom of the table FC Edmonton, a playoff spot was within their grasp. The season ended in heartbreak: Edmonton went up three goals to nil, seemingly ending Valour's playoff chances, but in the final fifteen minutes Mosed Dyer scored twice and then Daryl Fordyce scored to equalize things. If Valour scored one more goal they would have made the playoffs, but they could not and finished the season in fifth.

== Current squad ==
As of June 26, 2021.

No.	Name	Nationality	Position(s)	Date of birth (age)	Previous club
Goalkeepers
0	Matt Silva	(Canada)	GK	March 28, 1991 (aged 30)	(Canada) York9 FC
1	Jonathan Sirois	(Canada)	GK	June 27, 2001 (aged 20)	(Canada) CF Montréal
Defenders
4	Tony Mikhael	(Lebanon)	CB / FB	March 1, 2000 (aged 21)	(Canada) Carleton Ravens
5	Amir Soto	(Panama)	CB	November 4, 1997 (aged 24)	(Panama) CD Universitario
12	Rocco Romeo	(Canada)	CB	March 25, 2000 (aged 21)	(Canada) Toronto FC
29	Arnold Bouka Moutou	(Republic of the Congo)	LB	November 28, 1988 (aged 33)	(France) Dijon
35	Andrew Jean-Baptiste	(Haiti)	CB	June 16, 1992 (aged 29)	(Sweden) Umeå FC
82	Andy Baquero	(Cuba)	RB / RW	August 17, 1994 (aged 27)	(Dominican Republic) Delfines del Este
42	Rafael Galhardo	(Brazil)	RB	October 30, 1991 (aged 30)	(Brazil) Vasco da Gama
	Rodrigo Reyes	(Mexico)	CB	February 1, 2001 (aged 20)	(Mexico) C.D. Guadalajara
Midfielders
7	Moses Dyer	(New Zealand)	CM	March 21, 1997 (aged 24)	(Norway) Florø SK
8	Keven Alemán	(Canada)	AM	March 25, 1994 (aged 27)	(Canada) FC Edmonton
14	Stefan Cebara	(Canada)	RW / LW	April 12, 1991 (aged 30)	(Serbia) Vojvodina Novi Sad
17	Brett Levis	(Canada)	MF	March 29, 1993 (aged 28)	(Canada) Vancouver Whitecaps
18	Jared Ulloa	(Peru)	RW / LW	June 8, 2002 (aged 19)	(Peru) Sporting Cristal
21	José Galán	(Spain)	CM	February 2, 1986 (aged 35)	(Saudi Arabia) Al-Jabalain
27	Raphael Ohin	(Ghana)	CM	May 25, 1995 (aged 26)	(Canada) WSA Winnipeg
77	Federico Peña	(Trinidad and Tobago)	MF	March 30, 1999 (aged 22)	(Belgium) Standard Liège
Forwards
9	Austin Ricci	(Canada)	ST	April 8, 1996 (aged 25)	(Canada) York9 FC
10	Masta Kacher	(Algeria)	CF / AM	November 8, 1995 (aged 26)	(United States) Saint Louis FC
16	Daryl Fordyce	(Northern Ireland)	CF	January 2, 1987 (aged 34)	(Republic of Ireland) Sligo Rovers
19	William Akio	(South Sudan)	CF	July 23, 1998 (aged 23)	(United States) UTRGV Vaqueros
24	Sean Rea	(Canada)	CF / CM	May 15, 2002 (aged 19)	(Canada) CF Montréal

== Transfers ==
=== In ===
==== Transferred in ====
No.	Pos.	Player	From club	Fee/notes	Date	Source
	FW	(Venezuela) Ronny Maza	(Venezuela) Trujillanos	Free	January 7, 2021	
	MF	(Costa Rica) Néstor Monge	(Costa Rica) Jicaral	Free	February 2, 2021	
8	MF	(Canada) Keven Alemán	(Canada) FC Edmonton	Free	February 4, 2021	
19	FW	(South Sudan) William Akio	(United States) UTRGV Vaqueros	Free	May 5, 2021	
	DF	(Brazil) Rafael Galhardo	(Brazil) Vasco da Gama	Free	June 3, 2021	
4	DF	(Lebanon) Tony Mikhael	(Canada) Carleton Ravens	Selected 14th overall in the 2021 CPL–U Sports Draft	June 11, 2021	
82	DF	(Cuba) Andy Baquero	(Dominican Republic) Delfines del Este	Free	June 26, 2021	

==== Loans in ====
No.	Pos.	Player	Loaned from	Fee/notes	Date	Source
18	MF	(Peru) Jared Ulloa	(Peru) Sporting Cristal	Season-long loan	January 27, 2021	
1	GK	(Canada) Jonathan Sirois	(Canada) CF Montréal	Season-long loan	April 6, 2021	
24	FW	(Canada) Sean Rea	(Canada) CF Montréal	Season-long loan	April 6, 2021	
	DF	(Mexico) Rodrigo Reyes	(Mexico) C.D. Guadalajara	Season-long loan	June 10, 2021	
12	DF	(Canada) Rocco Romeo	(Canada) Toronto FC	Season-long loan	July 30, 2021	

==== Draft picks ====
Valour FC selected the following players in the 2021 CPL–U Sports Draft on January 29, 2021. Draft picks are not automatically signed to the team roster. Only those who are signed to a contract will be listed as transfers in.

Round	Selection	Pos.	Player	Nationality	University
1	3	GK	Yuba-Rayane Yesli	Algeria	Montreal Carabins
2	14	DF	Tony Mikhael	Lebanon	Carleton Ravens

=== Out ===
==== Transferred out ====
No.	Pos.	Player	To club	Fee/notes	Date	Source
10	MF	(Canada) Dylan Carreiro	Retired	Contract expired	October 17, 2020	
33	MF	(Canada) Fraser Aird	(Canada) FC Edmonton	Contract expired	December 24, 2020	
4	DF	(Canada) Yohan Le Bourhis		Contract expired	January 15, 2021	
3	DF	(Algeria) Chakib Hocine		Contract expired	January 15, 2021	
11	FW	(Canada) Shaan Hundal	(United States) Fort Lauderdale CF	Contract expired	January 15, 2021	
25	MF	(Ghana) Solomon Kojo Antwi		Contract expired	January 15, 2021	
8	MF	(Canada) Diego Gutiérrez	(Chile) A.C. Barnechea	Contract expired	March 3, 2021	
	MF	(Costa Rica) Néstor Monge		Contract terminated by mutual consent	April 29, 2021	
	FW	(Venezuela) Ronny Maza		Contract terminated by mutual consent	May 14, 2021	

==== Loans out ====
No.	Pos.	Player	Loaned to	Fee/notes	Date	Source
21	MF	(Spain) José Galán	(Spain) Villarrobledo	Loaned until March 2021	September 24, 2020	
8	MF	(Canada) Keven Alemán	(Costa Rica) Guadalupe	Loaned until May 2021	February 4, 2021	

== Competitions ==
=== Canadian Premier League ===
==== Table ====
Pos	Team	Pld	W	D	L	GF	GA	GD	Pts	Qualification
1	Forge (S)	28	16	2	10	39	24	+15	50	Advance to playoffs
2	Cavalry	28	14	8	6	34	30	+4	50	Advance to playoffs
3	Pacific (C)	28	13	6	9	47	34	+13	45	Advance to playoffs
4	York United	28	8	12	8	35	39	−4	36	Advance to playoffs
5	Valour	28	10	5	13	38	36	+2	35	
6	HFX Wanderers	28	8	11	9	28	34	−6	35	
7	FC Edmonton	28	6	10	12	34	41	−7	28	
8	Atlético Ottawa	28	6	8	14	30	47	−17	26	

Updated to match(es) played on unknown. Source: CanPL.ca
Rules for classification: 1) points; 2) total wins.
(C) Champions; (S) Regular season winner

==== Results by match ====
Match	1	2	3	4	5	6	7	8	9	10	11	12	13	14	15	16	17	18	19	20	21	22	23	24	25	26	27	28
Result	W	W	W	L	W	W	W	L	L	L	L	D	L	W	L	L	L	D	L	L	D	D	W	L	L	W	W	D
Position	2	2	1	1	1	1	1	1	1	2	3	3	3	4	4	4	4	5	6	6	6	6	6	6	6	6	5	5

Source: #Matches
W = Win; D = Draw; L = Loss

==== Matches ====
June 27 1	Forge FC	0–2	Valour FC	Winnipeg, Manitoba
1:00pm	Jaković (yellow card) 6'; Bekker (yellow card) 31'; Nanco (yellow card) 90+2'	Report	Dyer 6' (pen.), (yellow card) 46'; Ricci 26'; Fordyce (yellow card) 32'	Stadium: IG Field; Attendance: 0 Referee: Filip Dujic

June 30 2	Valour FC	2–0	HFX Wanderers FC	Winnipeg, Manitoba
6:00pm	Jean-Baptiste 20'; Akio 89'	Report	Ruby (yellow card) 48'; Marshall (yellow card) 71'	Stadium: IG Field; Attendance: 0 Referee: Carly Shaw-MacLaren

July 3 3	Valour FC	2–0	Atlético Ottawa	Winnipeg, Manitoba
9:00pm	Ohin 45'; Ricci (yellow card) 70'; Dyer 90+2' (pen.)	Report	Acosta (yellow card) 40'; Neufville (yellow card) 82'; Beckie (yellow card) 90+2'	Stadium: IG Field; Attendance: 0 Referee: Ben Hoskins

July 7 4	York United FC	2–1	Valour FC	Winnipeg, Manitoba
9:00pm	Wright 14'; Zator 48'; Mohammed (yellow card) 75'; Ramírez (yellow card) 90+3'	Report	Jean-Baptiste 5'; Alemán (yellow card) 42'; Ricci (yellow card) 84'; Cebara (yellow card) 90+7'	Stadium: IG Field; Referee: Yusri Rudolf

July 11 5	Valour FC	1–0	Forge FC	Winnipeg, Manitoba
12:30pm	Ricci 56'; Peña (yellow card) 87'; Dyer (yellow card) 90+3'	Report	Sabak (yellow card) 45+2'; Bekker (yellow card) 90'; Navarro (yellow card) 90+3'	Stadium: IG Field; Referee: Carly Shaw-MacLaren

July 15 6	Atlético Ottawa	0–1	Valour FC	Winnipeg, Manitoba
4:00pm	Rafael Núñez (yellow card) 45+2'; Beckie (yellow card) 58'	Report	Ricci (yellow card) 16'; Dyer 85'; Baquero (yellow card) 90+3'; Ulloa (yellow card) 90+5'	Stadium: IG Field; Attendance: 0 Referee: Fabrizio Stasolla

July 18 7	Valour FC	3–0	York United FC	Winnipeg, Manitoba
1:30pm	Cebara 18'; Ricci 42', 73'; Ohin (yellow card) 54'; Dyer (yellow card) 57'; Reyes (yellow card) 62'	Report	Giantsopoulos (yellow card) 19'; Wilson (yellow card) 26'; Ferrari (yellow card) 72'	Stadium: IG Field; Referee: David Barrie

July 24 8	HFX Wanderers FC	1–0	Valour FC	Winnipeg, Manitoba
1:00pm	Doner (yellow card) 29'; Lamothe 44' (yellow card) 49'; Morelli (yellow card) 45+2'; Rampersad (yellow card) 54'; Bent (yellow card) 90+4'	Report	Cebara (yellow card) 45+2'	Stadium: IG Field; Attendance: 0 Referee: Carly Shaw-Maclaren

July 31 9	FC Edmonton	3–1	Valour FC	Edmonton, Alberta
8:00pm	Ongaro 13'; Mabussi (yellow card) 25'; Warschewski 55'; Didic 63'	Report	Alemán (yellow card) 2'; Baquero 88'	Stadium: Clarke Stadium; Referee: David Gantar

August 4 10	Pacific FC	2–1	Valour FC	Langford, British Columbia
8:30 pm	Dixon (yellow card) 4'; Hojabrpour (yellow card) 44'; Heard (yellow card) 48'; MacNaughton 66'; Irving (red card) 76'; Bustos 87'	Report	Ulloa (yellow card) 7'; Romeo 41'; Akio (yellow card) 46'; Romeo (yellow card) 54'	Stadium: Starlight Stadium; Referee: Mathieu Souaré

August 8 11	Cavalry FC	1–0	Valour FC	Calgary, Alberta
3:00 pm	Escalante (yellow card) 33'; Farsi 41'; Ledgerwood (yellow card) 56'; Farsi (yellow card) 57'	Report	Levis (yellow card) 16'; Sirois (yellow card) 45'; Ohin (yellow card) 50'; Romeo (yellow card) 66'	Stadium: ATCO Field; Referee: Mathieu Souaré

August 12 12	FC Edmonton	0–0	Valour FC	Edmonton, Alberta
8:00 pm	Ongaro (yellow card) 30'; Gee (yellow card) 38'	Report	Dyer (yellow card) 15'; Fordyce (yellow card) 45'; Soto (yellow card) 53'; Ohin (yellow card) 60'; Kacher (yellow card) 90'	Stadium: Clarke Stadium

August 16 13	Valour FC	0–2	Pacific FC	Winnipeg, Manitoba
7:00 pm	Peña (yellow card) 27'; Ohin (yellow card) 64'	Report	Liceága 29'; Aparicio (yellow card) 34'; MacNaughton (yellow card) 50'; Haynes (yellow card) 66'; Campbell 73'; Campbell (yellow card) 90+2'	Stadium: IG Field; Attendance: 2,736; Referee: Alain Ruch

August 24 14	Valour FC	3–0	FC Edmonton	Winnipeg, Manitoba
7:00 pm	Akio 2', 52'; Galhardo 62'; Reyes (yellow card) 75'; Bouka Moutou (yellow card) 80'; Mikhael (yellow card) 90+2'	Report	Ongaro (yellow card) 37'; Didic (yellow card) 41'	Stadium: IG Field; Attendance: 2,480; Referee: Mathieu Souaré

August 29 15	Pacific FC	3–2	Valour FC	Langford, British Columbia
5:30 pm	Díaz 11'; Polisi 22'; Campbell 35'; MacNaughton (yellow card) 43'; Aparicio (yellow card) 60'; Hojabrpour (yellow card) 86'	Report	Ricci 17'; Ohin (yellow card) 61'; Romeo (yellow card) 65'; Mikhael (yellow card) 74'; Alemán 86' (pen.)	Stadium: Starlight Stadium; Attendance: 2,621; Referee: Alain Ruch

September 4 16	Valour FC	0–1	Cavalry FC	Winnipeg, Manitoba
6:00 pm	Galhardo (yellow card) 37'; Ricci (yellow card) 38'; Mikhael (yellow card) 44'; Ohin (yellow card) 45+2'; Baquero (yellow card) 90'; Romeo (red card) 90+8'	Report	Camargo (yellow card) 21'; Yao (yellow card) 30'; Mason 32'; Trafford (yellow card) 37'; Farsi (yellow card) 38'; Ledgerwood (yellow card) 42'; Fisk (yellow card) 52'; Novak (yellow card) 90+8'	Stadium: IG Field; Referee: Carly Shaw-MacLaren

September 7 17	Valour FC	0–3	FC Edmonton	Winnipeg, Manitoba
7:00 pm	Ohin (yellow card) 90+2'	Report	Gee (yellow card) 33'; Warschewski 40'; Ongaro 44'; Shome (yellow card) 71'; Gonzalez 73'	Stadium: IG Field; Attendance: 2,446; Referee: Juan Marquez

September 18 18	Valour FC	1–1	Cavalry FC	Winnipeg, Manitoba
3:00 pm	Fordyce (yellow card) 17'; Alemán 71'; Dyer (yellow card) 81'; Galán (yellow card) 84'; Reyes (yellow card) 89'	Report	Ledgerwood 54'; Farsi (yellow card) 88'	Stadium: IG Field; Attendance: 3,000; Referee: Fabrizio Stasolla

September 26 19	York United	2–1	Valour FC	Toronto, Ontario
1:00 pm	Wilson (yellow card) 35'; Verhoeven (yellow card) 50'; Wright 55' 61'	Report	Fordyce (yellow card) 10'; Levis 27' (yellow card) 37'	Stadium: York Lions Stadium; Attendance: 1,122; Referee: Scott Bowman

September 29 20	Valour FC	1–3	Pacific FC	Winnipeg, Manitoba
6:45 pm	Romeo (yellow card) 2'; Dyer 30' (yellow card) 41'; Ulloa (yellow card) 79'	Report	Diaz 3' (pen.) 45+2'; Samake (yellow card) 57'; Blasco 69'; dos Santos (yellow card) 86'	Stadium: IG Field

October 2 21	Valour FC	1–1	FC Edmonton	Winnipeg, Manitoba
2:00 pm	Dyer 14'; Baquero (yellow card) 50'; Alemán (yellow card) 57'; Galán (yellow card) 86'	Report	Tboy Fayia (yellow card) 33'; Ongaro 67'	Stadium: IG Field; Referee: Ben Hoskins

October 5 22	Valour FC	0–0	Cavalry FC	Winnipeg, Manitoba
7:00 pm	Ulloa (yellow card) 51'; Levis (yellow card) 72'	Report	Norman Jr. (yellow card) 64'	Stadium: IG Field; Attendance: 2,600; Referee: David Barrie

October 11 23	Valour FC	3–1	Forge FC	Winnipeg, Manitoba
2:00 pm	Romeo 5'; Akio 45'; Fordyce (yellow card) 51'; Baquero (yellow card) 58'; Dyer 59'; Galhardo (yellow card) 64'; Galán (yellow card) 87'	Report	Metusala 38'; Nanco (yellow card) 76'; Son (yellow card) 90'; Browne (yellow card) 90+2'; Borges (yellow card) 90+2'	Stadium: IG Field; Referee: Pierre-Luc Lauziere

October 16 24	Pacific FC	3–2	Valour FC	Langford, British Columbia
5:00 pm	Heard 9'; Campbell 23'; Campbell 49'; Samake (yellow card) 74'	Report	Fordyce 14'; Cebara (yellow card) 34'; Ulloa (yellow card) 55'; Akio 49'	Stadium: Starlight Stadium; Attendance: 3,214; Referee: Voja Sremcevic

October 20 25	Atletico Ottawa	2–0	Valour FC	Ottawa, Ontario
6:00 pm	Shaw 57'; Telfer 64'	Report		Stadium: TD Place Stadium; Attendance: 2,271; Referee: Fabrizio Stasolla

October 26 26	Valour FC	3–0	HFX Wanderers	Winnipeg, Manitoba
7:30 pm	Akio 38'; Galhardo 45'; Levis (yellow card) 49'; Rea 66'	Report		Stadium: IG Field; Referee: Alain Ruch

October 30 27	Cavalry FC	2–4	Valour FC	Calgary, Alberta
2:30 pm	Camargo 14', (yellow card) 63'; Mason 38'; Yao (yellow card) 60'; Loturi (yellow card) 90'	Report	Romeo (yellow card) 8'; Dyer 9'; Galán (yellow card) 39'; Akio 43', 69'; Alemán 90+4'	Stadium: ATCO Field; Attendance: 2,411; Referee: Juan Marquez

November 6 28	FC Edmonton	3–3	Valour FC	Edmonton, Alberta
2:30 pm	Warschewski 4'; Didic 16'; Gonzalez 48'; Temguia (yellow card) 72'; Najem (yellow card) 90+3'	Report	Dyer 78' 81'; Fordyce 88'; Romeo (yellow card) 90+3'	Stadium: Clarke Stadium; Attendance: 716; Referee: David Barrie

=== Canadian Championship ===
==== Preliminary Round ====
August 21	Atlético Ottawa	2–3	Valour FC	Ottawa, Ontario
7:00 PM	Wright 16'; Viti 90+2'	Report	Rea 30'; Mikhael (yellow card) 37'; Ricci 60', 63'	Stadium: TD Place Stadium; Attendance: 2,881; Referee: Pierre-Luc Lauzière

==== Quarter-final ====
September 15	Forge FC	2–1	Valour FC	Hamilton, Ontario
7:30pm	Choinière 33'; Pacius 38'; Sabak (yellow card) 90+4'	Report	Ricci 60'; Ohin (yellow card) 78'; Galhardo (yellow card) 83' (yellow-red card) 90+7'	Stadium: Tim Hortons Field; Referee: David Barrie

== Statistics ==
=== Players ===
No.	Pos	Nat	Name	Total			Canadian Premier League			Canadian Championship		
No.	Pos	Nat	Name	Apps	Goals	Assists	Apps	Goals	Assists	Apps	Goals	Assists
2	DF	(Mexico)	Rodrigo Reyes	18	0	0	17	0	0	1	0	0
3	DF	(Republic of the Congo)	Arnold Bouka Moutou	16	0	1	14	0	0	2	0	1
4	DF	(Lebanon)	Tony Mikhael	13	0	0	12	0	0	1	0	0
5	DF	(Panama)	Amir Soto	6	0	0	5	0	0	1	0	0
7	MF	(New Zealand)	Moses Dyer	29	9	5	27	9	4	2	0	1
8	MF	(Canada)	Keven Alemán	25	3	3	24	3	3	1	0	0
9	FW	(Canada)	Austin Ricci	18	8	2	16	5	2	2	3	0
10	FW	(Algeria)	Masta Kacher	12	0	0	11	0	0	1	0	0
12	DF	(Canada)	Rocco Romeo	18	2	0	16	2	0	2	0	0
14	DF	(Canada)	Stefan Cebara	27	1	2	26	1	2	1	0	0
16	FW	(Northern Ireland)	Daryl Fordyce	28	2	2	26	2	2	2	0	0
17	MF	(Canada)	Brett Levis	17	1	0	16	1	0	1	0	0
18	FW	(Peru)	Jared Ulloa	23	0	1	22	0	1	1	0	0
19	FW	(South Sudan)	William Akio	30	8	4	28	8	3	2	0	1
21	MF	(Spain)	José Galán	12	0	1	11	0	1	1	0	0
24	FW	(Canada)	Sean Rea	25	2	4	23	1	4	2	1	0
27	MF	(Ghana)	Raphael Ohin	28	1	2	26	1	2	2	0	0
35	DF	(Haiti)	Andrew Jean-Baptiste	7	2	0	7	2	0	0	0	0
42	DF	(Brazil)	Rafael Galhardo	25	2	3	23	2	3	2	0	0
55	MF	(Canada)	Caden Tomy	5	0	0	4	0	0	1	0	0
77	DF	(Trinidad and Tobago)	Federico Peña	26	0	1	24	0	1	2	0	0
82	MF	(Cuba)	Andy Baquero	23	1	0	23	1	0	0	0	0

=== Goalkeepers ===
No.	Nat	Name	Total			Canadian Premier League			Canadian Championship		
No.	Nat	Name	Apps	Conceded	Shutout	Apps	Conceded	Shutout	Apps	Conceded	Shutouts
1	(Canada)	Jonathan Sirois	24	31	9	24	31	9	0	0	0
99	(Canada)	Matt Silva	6	9	1	4	5	1	2	4	0
