= Tony Mikhael =

Association football player (born 2000)

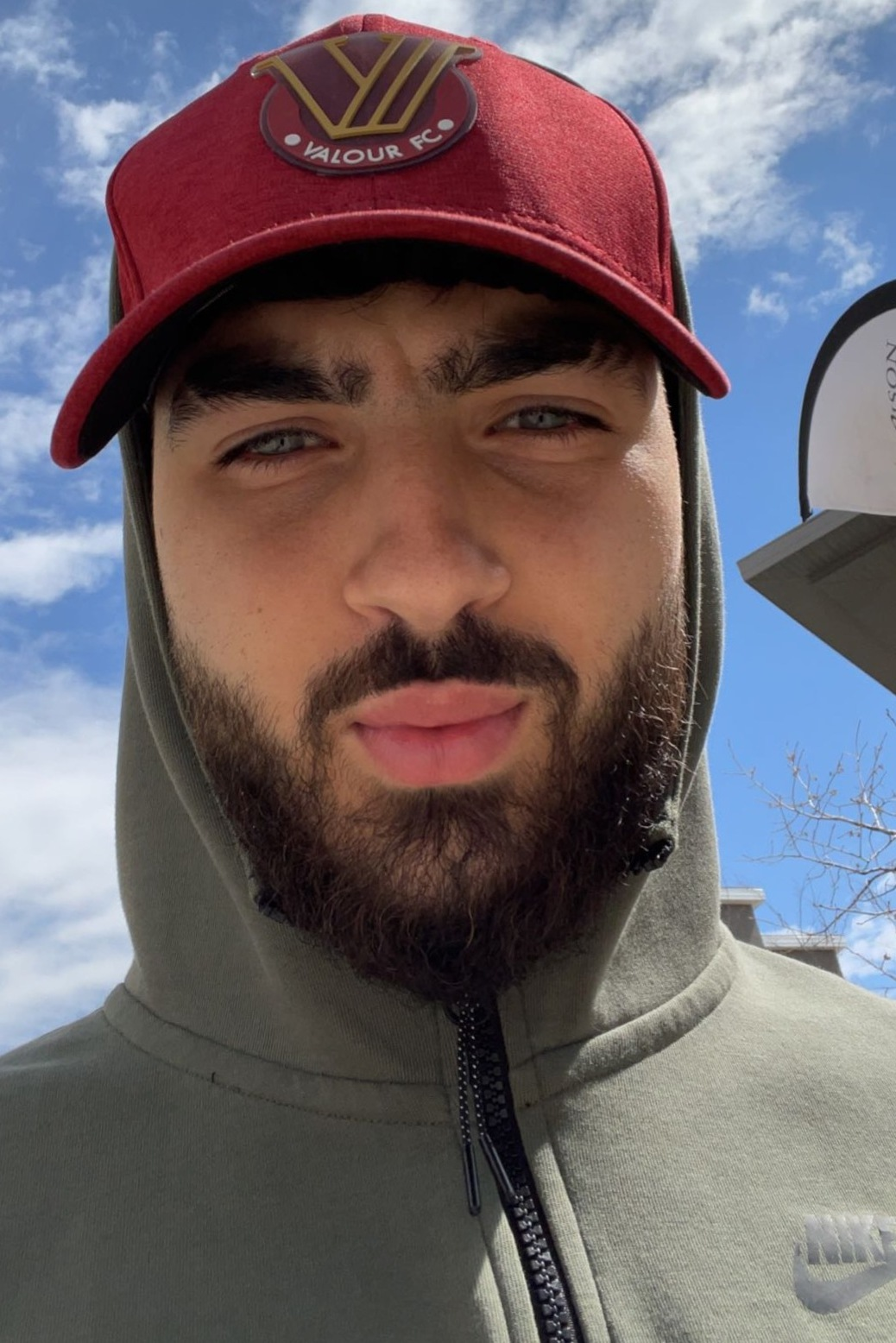
- Mikhael in 2021

Personal information
- Full name: Anthony Elias Camille Mikhael
- Date of birth: March 1, 2000 (age 26)
- Place of birth: Ottawa, Ontario, Canada
- Height: 1.83 m (6 ft 0 in)
- Position: Defender

Youth career
- Nepean Hotspurs SC
- 2014–2017: Ottawa South United

College career
Years	Team	Apps	(Gls)
2018–2019	Carleton Ravens	25	(0)

Senior career*
Years	Team	Apps	(Gls)
2017–2019	Ottawa South United	11	(0)
2021–2022	Valour FC	17	(0)
Total		28	(0)

International career
2021	Lebanon U22	2	(0)
2021	Lebanon U23	5	(0)
- * Club domestic league appearances and goals

Anthony Elias Camille Mikhael (Arabic: انطوني إلياس كميل مخائيل; born 1 March 2000) is a former professional footballer who played as a defender. A versatile defender, Mikhael played as both a centre-back and a full-back. Born in Canada, Mikhael represented Lebanon at youth level. He also won gold with Team Ontario at the Canada Games.

== Early life ==
Mikhael was born on 1 March 2000, in Ottawa, Ontario, Canada, to Lebanese parents Camille and Helena. He studied at St. Pius X High School.

Mikhael began playing at the youth level with Nepean Hotspurs SC, later moving to Ottawa South United when he was 14. He won an OYSL League Championship (2014), an Ontario Cup (2015), and a Quebec-Ontario Cup (2014). Mikhael also represented Team Ontario at the 2017 Canada Summer Games, helping them win the gold medal, and was awarded player of the match in the final.

== University career ==
On 12 April 2018, Mikhael joined Carleton University's soccer side Carleton Ravens. In 2018–19, he won the Ontario University Athletics (OUA) East, and won bronze at the U Sports championship. In 2019–20 Mikhael won the OUA East for the second time, as well as the play-offs, and finished in fourth place at the U Sports championship. He also won the 2019–20 RSEQ Indoor Winter League.

== Club career ==
While at Carleton, he also played with Ottawa South United in League1 Ontario from 2017 to 2019. He made his debut on 9 September 2017, against Master's FA. He didn't return in 2020, due to him suffering a fracture in his foot and undergoing surgery in March.

On 29 January 2021, Mikhael was selected by Canadian Premier League side Valour FC in the 2021 CPL–U Sports Draft, and invited to the team's preseason training camp to compete for a roster spot. He signed a developmental contract on 11 June allowing him to retain his university eligibility, although in September, he announced that he had decided to forgo his remaining university sports eligibility to remain with Valour, and completing his degree after the season. On 30 June 2021, Mikhael made his debut as a substitute in a 2–0 win over HFX Wanderers. His debut from the first minute came on 4 July, helping Valour FC win 2–0 against Atlético Ottawa. In January 2022, Mikhael re-signed with Valour ahead of the upcoming season. His contract expired after the end of the 2022 season.

== International career ==
Born in Canada, Mikhael is also eligible to represent Lebanon through his parents. In 2015, Mikhael attended a training camp with the Canada national under-15 team.

In late 2020, Mikhael was identified by Lebanon U23 head coach Jamal Al Haj; Mikhael's Ottawa-based personal trainer had trained Al Haj's son in Beirut, Lebanon. In November 2020, he played for the U22 team in three unofficial friendlies against Lebanese Premier League sides, scoring a penalty goal against Ahed. In March 2021, he made his official U22 debut in two friendly matches against Bahrain U22.

In 2021, Mikhael represented the under-23 team in the 2021 WAFF U-23 Championship, and the qualifiers for the 2022 AFC U-23 Asian Cup.

== Personal life ==
Mikhael's favorite national team is Brazil, while his favorite club is Spanish side Barcelona. He has described defenders Paolo Maldini and Sergio Ramos as points of reference. Mikhael enjoys fishing in the summer and studying Arabic, and has volunteered at the St. Elias Cathedral in Ottawa, Ontario, Canada.

While playing for the Carleton Ravens, Mikhael studied finance at Carleton University. He is the cousin of Canada women's national team player Clarissa Larisey.

== Career statistics ==
=== Club ===
Appearances and goals by club, season and competition
Club	Season	League			Playoffs		National cup (Note: Includes Canadian Championship)		League cup (Note: Includes League1 Ontario Cup)		Total	
Club	Season	Division	Apps	Goals	Apps	Goals	Apps	Goals	Apps	Goals	Apps	Goals
Ottawa South United	2017	League1 Ontario	2	0	—		—		0	0	2	0
Ottawa South United	2018	League1 Ontario	3	0	—		—		0	0	3	0
Ottawa South United	2019	League1 Ontario	6	0	—		—		—		6	0
Ottawa South United	Total		11	0	0	0	0	0	0	0	11	0
Valour FC	2021	Canadian Premier League	12	0	—		1	0	—		13	0
Valour FC	2022	Canadian Premier League	5	0	—		1	0	—		6	0
Valour FC	Total		17	0	0	0	2	0	0	0	19	0
Career total			28	0	0	0	2	0	0	0	30	0

=== International ===
As of match played 31 October 2021

Appearances and goals by national team and year
National team	Year	Apps	Goals
Lebanon U22	2021	2	0
Total		2	0
Lebanon U23	2021	5	0
Total		5	0
Career total		7	0

== Honours ==
Team Ontario

- Canada Games gold medalist: 2017
