= James Talbot (footballer) =

Irish footballer (born 1997)

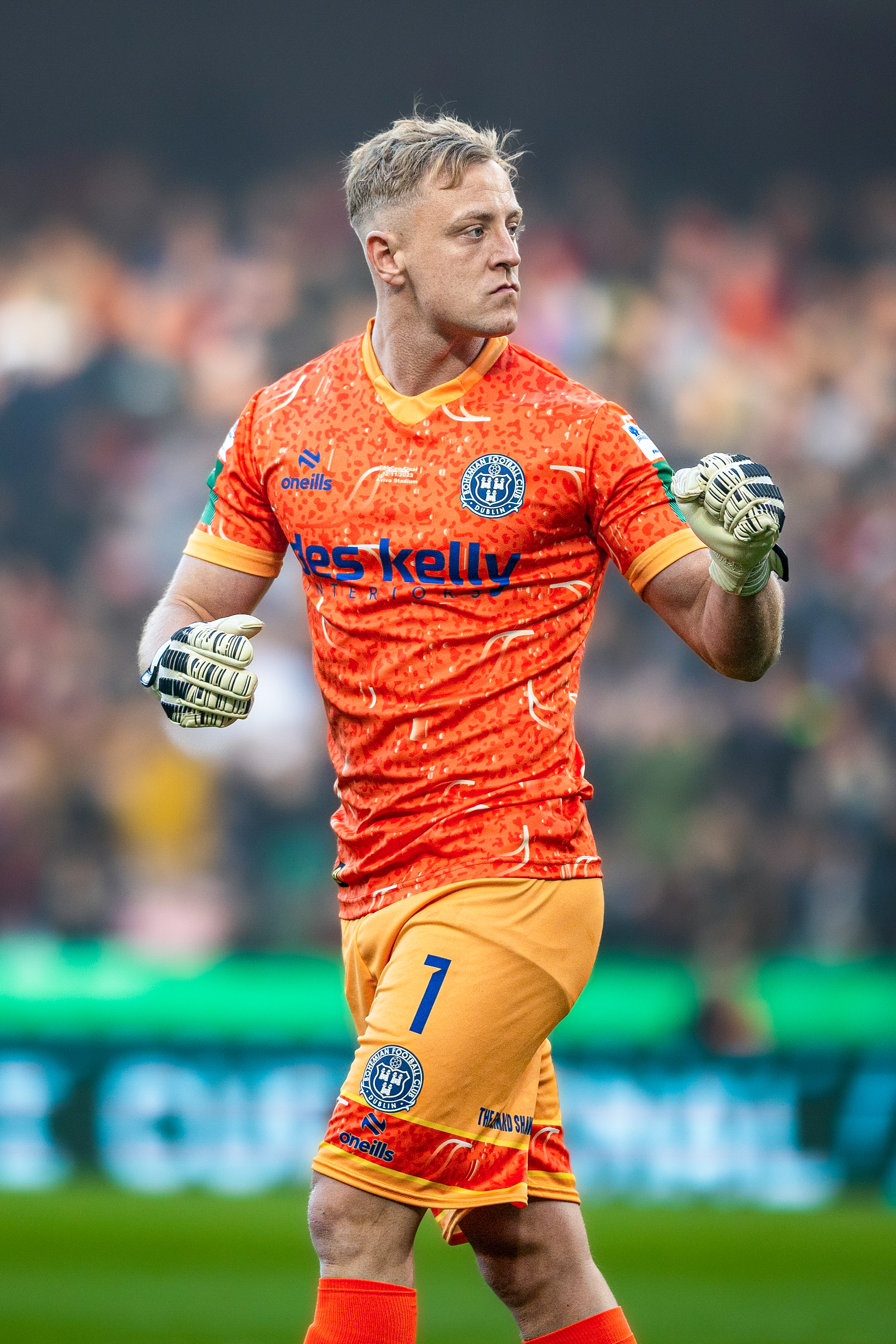
- Talbot playing for Bohemians in 2023

Personal information
- Date of birth: 24 April 1997 (age 29)
- Place of birth: Dublin, Ireland
- Position: Goalkeeper

Team information
- Current team: Corpus Christi FC
- Number: 1

Youth career
- 2013: Home Farm
- 2013–2018: Sunderland

Senior career*
| Years | Team | Apps | (Gls) |
| 2017–2018 | Sunderland | 0 | (0) |
| 2017–2018 | → Darlington (loan) | 6 | (0) |
| 2019–2025 | Bohemians | 141 | (0) |
| 2026– | Corpus Christi FC | 21 | (0) |

International career
| 2013 | Republic of Ireland U17 | 3 | (0) |
| 2015 | Republic of Ireland U19 | 5 | (0) |
- * Club domestic league appearances and goals as of 14:02, 31 October 2026 (UTC)

James Talbot (born 24 April 1997) is an Irish professional footballer signed as a goalkeeper for the USL League One club Corpus Christi FC.

== Early life ==
James Talbot was born in Dublin and grew up in Finglas. Talbot started his football career with Home Farm in the North Dublin suburb of Whitehall. Home Farm had previously produced a number of Republic of Ireland internationals, including Johnny Giles, Ronnie Whelan, and Richard Dunne. At the age of 15, he was signed by English club Sunderland. Between 2016 and 2018, he made a number of appearances for Sunderland's Under-23 side and in the EFL Trophy.

== Club career ==
=== Darlington ===
In December 2017, Talbot was sent on loan to National League North side Darlington FC, in a deal intended to run until April 2018. In doing so he followed in the footsteps of fellow Sunderland academy product and goalkeeper Jordan Pickford, who spent a spell on loan with the Quakers in the 2011–12 season. Talbot was immediately installed as Darlington's number one goalkeeper, starting in six games and firmly establishing himself as a regular starter.

His time at Blackwell Meadows took a bad turn in January 2018, following a 1–1 draw away to relegation rivals Alfreton Town. With Darlington leading 1–0 in the 88th minute of the game, Talbot was penalised for punching Alfreton midfielder Tom Allan immediately after punching clear a cross, earning a red card for violent conduct. A resulting penalty was scored, leading to a 1–1 draw and keeping Darlington in the relegation zone. He lost his place in the team following the match, and was replaced as the club's primary goalkeeper by Aynsley Pears. In late February 2018, after receiving a three-match ban for the incident with Alfreton, Talbot was sent back to Sunderland.

In June 2018, Sunderland announced the release of eight players, including Talbot and former Irish international John O'Shea.

=== Bohemians ===
In November 2018, League of Ireland Premier Division outfit Bohemians announced that they had signed Talbot on a free transfer. He was signed with a view to challenging Shane Supple for the number one shirt, however, Supple was soon after forced to retire due to a persistent knee injury, making the announcement just the day after Talbot signed.

He made his debut for the Gypsies in a 1–0 home win over Finn Harps at Dalymount Park on 15 February 2019. Talbot went five games without conceding a goal, before allowing two in a 2–2 draw at home to Derry City on 8 March 2019. Throughout April 2019, Talbot's goal was breached just once, a late penalty scored by Dundalk striker Pat Hoban at Oriel Park. This run of six clean sheets, and Talbot's personal good form, resulted in him being named League of Ireland Player of the Month award for April. Bohs teammate Danny Mandroiu was runner-up in the award. His form for Bohemians was recognised by Republic of Ireland manager Mick McCarthy in May, when he called Talbot into the Ireland squad.

On 30 June 2019, Bohemians announced that Talbot was among seven first-team players to sign contract extensions, keeping them at the club for the 2020 season.

On 25 October 2019, the last day of the League of Ireland season, James Talbot was named Bohemian FC Player of the Year 2019.

In January 2024, Talbot announced he was 'stepping back' from football due to his mental health.

In November 2025, the club announced that Talbot would be departing at the end of his contract.

=== Corpus Christi ===
On 31 January 2026, Talbot joined USL League One club Corpus Christi ahead of the club's first professional season.

== International career ==
In late May 2019, Republic of Ireland manager Mick McCarthy called Talbot into his squad for a pair of upcoming European qualifiers against Denmark and Gibraltar. While Talbot ultimately played no part in either game, he had matched the achievements of fellow League of Ireland goalkeepers Shane Supple and Gary Rogers in earning a call-up to the Ireland squad.

== Career statistics ==
As of match played 13 September 2026

| Club | Division | Season | League | | National Cup (Note: Includes FA Cup, FAI Cup & U.S. Open Cup) | | League Cup (Note: Includes EFL Cup, League of Ireland Cup & USL Cup) | | Europe | | Other | | Total | |
| Club | Division | Season | Apps | Goals | Apps | Goals | Apps | Goals | Apps | Goals | Apps | Goals | Apps | Goals |
|---|---|---|---|---|---|---|---|---|---|---|---|---|---|---|
| Sunderland | Premier League | 2016–17 | 0 | 0 | 0 | 0 | 0 | 0 | — | | 0 (Note: Appearances in EFL Trophy) | 0 | 0 | 0 |
| Sunderland | EFL Championship | 2017–18 | 0 | 0 | — | | 0 | 0 | — | | 2 | 0 | 2 | 0 |
| Sunderland | Total | | 0 | 0 | 0 | 0 | 0 | 0 | — | | 2 | 0 | 2 | 0 |
| Darlington (loan) | National League North | 2017–18 | 6 | 0 | — | | — | | — | | — | | 6 | 0 |
| Bohemians | LOI Premier Division | 2019 | 36 | 0 | 4 | 0 | 1 | 0 | — | | 0 (Note: Appearances in Leinster Senior Cup) | 0 | 41 | 0 |
| Bohemians | LOI Premier Division | 2020 | 8 | 0 | 2 | 0 | — | | 0 (Note: Appearances in UEFA Europa League) | 0 | — | | 10 | 0 |
| Bohemians | LOI Premier Division | 2021 | 34 | 0 | 4 | 0 | — | | 6 (Note: Appearances in UEFA Europa Conference League) | 0 | — | | 44 | 0 |
| Bohemians | LOI Premier Division | 2022 | 18 | 0 | 0 | 0 | — | | — | | — | | 18 | 0 |
| Bohemians | LOI Premier Division | 2023 | 36 | 0 | 5 | 0 | — | | — | | 1 | 0 | 42 | 0 |
| Bohemians | LOI Premier Division | 2024 | 2 | 0 | 0 | 0 | — | | — | | 0 | 0 | 2 | 0 |
| Bohemians | LOI Premier Division | 2025 | 7 | 0 | 2 | 0 | — | | — | | 1 | 0 | 10 | 0 |
| Bohemians | Total | | 141 | 0 | 17 | 0 | 1 | 0 | 6 | 0 | 2 | 0 | 167 | 0 |
| Corpus Christi FC | USL League One | 2026 | 21 | 0 | 0 | 0 | 1 | 0 | – | | – | | 22 | 0 |
| Career Total | | | 168 | 0 | 17 | 0 | 2 | 0 | 6 | 0 | 4 | 0 | 197 | 0 |

== Honours ==
Individual

- League of Ireland Player of the Month: April 2019
- Bohemians Player of the Year: 2019
