= William Akio =

South Sudanese footballer (born 1998)

Personal information
- Date of birth: 23 July 1998 (age 28)
- Place of birth: Nairobi, Kenya
- Height: 1.80 m (5 ft 11 in)
- Position: Forward

Team information
- Current team: Greenville Triumph

College career
Years	Team	Apps	(Gls)
2016–2017	SAIT Trojans	19	(18)
2018–2021	UTRGV Vaqueros	41	(18)

Senior career*
Years	Team	Apps	(Gls)
2017–2019	Calgary Foothills	29	(13)
2021–2022	Valour FC	41	(10)
2022–2023	Ross County	12	(1)
2023	→ Raith Rovers (loan)	14	(2)
2023–2024	Cavalry FC	18	(6)
2025	Tigers FC	18	(10)
2025	Marconi Stallions FC	8	(1)
2026–	Greenville Triumph	17	(2)

International career^{‡}
2022–	South Sudan	6	(0)
- * Club domestic league appearances and goals as of October 31, 2026 ‡ National team caps and goals as of November 23, 2023

William Akio (born 23 July 1998) is a professional footballer who plays as a forward for the Greenville Triumph in USL League One. Born in Kenya and raised in Canada, he plays for the South Sudan national team.

== Early life ==
Akio was born in a refugee camp in Nairobi, Kenya to South Sudanese parents who had fled the Second Sudanese Civil War. He later immigrated to Canada with his family, where he grew up in Calgary.

== Club career ==
=== Early career ===
In 2016, Akio attended the Southern Alberta Institute of Technology, where he scored eighteen goals in nineteen appearances over two years. In 2018, he transferred to the University of Texas Rio Grande Valley, where he went on to score eighteen goals in 41 appearances. Akio played for Calgary Foothills in USL League Two from 2017 to 2019, scoring 13 goals in 29 games, adding another 1 goal in 6 playoff games. In 2019, he scored 11 goals in 12 appearances.

=== Valour FC ===
On 5 May 2021, Akio signed his first professional contract with Canadian Premier League side Valour FC. On 27 June 2021, he made his debut as a substitute in a 2–0 win over Forge FC. He scored his first professional goal on June 30 in a match against HFX Wanderers. Valour started the season off very strong, aided by home field advantage as the first segment of the season was played only in Winnipeg due to the COVID-19 pandemic. When this part of the season ended, the team began to struggle midway through the season and fell out of a playoff position. However, Akio helped lead a resurgence near the end of the season, pushing Valour right into the thick of the playoff race, with performances such as his two goals and an assist in a crucial match against Cavalry. But despite Akio and the rest of the team's efforts, Valour just missed out of the playoffs. Overall Akio had a strong first professional season, finishing with eight goals and three assists, and was in especially excellent form in October and November, being named in the CPL Team of the Week twice.

In January 2022, Valour announced they had picked up Akio's contract option, keeping him at the club through 2022. He remained a fixture in Valour's starting eleven. During this season he made international headlines in a controversial manor, by accidentally making a goal-line clearance of his own teammate's shot. However, Valour still won the game. This incident did not derail his career, as just a week later he moved up through securing a transfer with Ross County, who had been impressed with his overall play. Akio departed Valour as the club's second highest goalscorer all time, behind Moses Dyer.

=== Ross County ===
In July 2022, Scottish Premiership side Ross County announced they had signed Akio from Valour FC on a three-year deal. On his debut against East Fife on July 23 in a Scottish League Cup match, Akio tallied two assists in less than two minutes. Later on in the game, Akio suffered a knee injury for which he underwent surgery for, sidelining him. On September 3, Akio made his league debut for Ross County against Aberdeen where he scored a last minute goal in the 95th minute to secure a point. Akio made his first start for the club on September 17 in an away league match against St Johnstone where they drew 0-0.

==== Raith Rovers (loan) ====
On 28 January 2023, Akio was loaned to Scottish Championship side Raith Rovers. He made his debut on the same day coming off the bench in a league game against Inverness Caledonian Thistle. Akio scored his first goal for The Rovers on 8 February 2023 in a Scottish Challenge Cup game against Dundee F.C. Raith went on to win the match 4–3 in penalties to advance the finals of the cup.

=== Cavalry FC ===
In July 2023, Akio returned to the Canadian Premier League, joining Cavalry FC for an undisclosed fee, signing a contract through the end of the 2025 season with his home-town club. Akio would score his first goal for Cavalry in his third game, celebrating by running to the stands to hug his mother. In July 2024 it was announced that Akio would miss the rest of the season due to an ankle injury. After the end of the 2024 season, Cavalry and Akio would mutually agree to terminate his contract, ending his time at the club.

=== Australia ===
On March 12, 2025, Akio signed with Tigers FC of the Australian NPL Capital Football. On 18 September 2025, he scored two goals in the NPL Grand Final against Monaro Panthers, helping his team win the title with a 3–0 victory.

In October 2025, he joined Marconi Stallions FC in the Australian Championship.

=== United States ===
In April 2026, Akio signed with USL League One side Greenville Triumph.

== International career ==
In 2021, Akio received his first call-up to the South Sudan national team, but did not make an appearance. A month after signing his first pro contract with Valour FC, he received another call-up for a friendly against Jordan. After the 2021 CPL season ended, Akio was again called up by South Sudan for friendlies against the Gambia and Algeria. Akio eventually made his international debut on 27 January 2022 in a friendly defeat to Uzbekistan.

== Personal life ==
Akio is the older brother of fellow football player Victor Loturi.

Akio runs a YouTube channel about his experiences as a professional and international soccer player, the channel has over 40,000 subscribers.

== Career statistics ==
=== Club ===
As of August 11, 2026

Club	Season	League	League		Playoffs		Cup		League Cup		Other		Total	
Club	Season	League	Apps	Goals	Apps	Goals	Apps	Goals	Apps	Goals	Apps	Goals	Apps	Goals
Calgary Foothills	2017	Premier Development League	7	1	1	0	—		—		—		8	1
Calgary Foothills	2018	Premier Development League	10	1	4	1	—		—		—		14	2
Calgary Foothills	2019	Premier Development League	12	11	1	0	—		—		—		13	11
Calgary Foothills	Total		29	13	6	1	0	0	0	0	0	0	35	14
Valour FC	2021	Canadian Premier League	28	8	—		2	0	—		—		30	8
Valour FC	2022	Canadian Premier League	13	2	—		1	0	—		—		14	2
Valour FC	Total		41	10	0	0	3	0	0	0	0	44	10	
Ross County	2022–23	Scottish Premiership	12	1	—		1	0	1	0	—		14	1
Raith Rovers (loan)	2022–23	Scottish Championship	14	2	—		0	0	0	0	1 (Note: Appearances in the Scottish Challenge Cup)	1	15	3
Cavalry FC	2023	Canadian Premier League	10	5	3	0	0	0	—		—		13	5
Cavalry FC	2024	Canadian Premier League	8	1	0	0	3	0	—		2	0	13	1
Cavalry FC	Total		18	6	3	0	3	0	0	0	2	0	26	6
Tigers FC	2025	NPL Capital Football	18	10	2	4	2	1	—		—		22	15
Marconi Stallions FC	2025	Australian Championship	8	1	0	0	0	0	—		—		8	1
Greenville Triumph	2026	USL League One	12	2	0	0	0	0	4	1	—		16	3
Career Total			152	45	11	4	9	1	5	1	3	1	180	53

=== International ===
As of match played 1 April 2023

National team	Year	Apps	Goals
South Sudan	2022	3	0
South Sudan	2023	2	0
Total		5	0

== Honours ==
Cavalry

- Canadian Premier League: 2024

Tigers

- National Premier Leagues Capital Football: 2025
