= Sam Roscoe =

English footballer (born 1998)

Personal information
- Date of birth: 16 June 1998 (age 28)
- Place of birth: Manchester, England
- Height: 6 ft 5 in (1.96 m)
- Position: Defender

Team information
- Current team: Corpus Christi
- Number: 5

Youth career
- 2016–17: Aberdeen

Senior career*
Years	Team	Apps	(Gls)
2016–2019	Aberdeen	0	(0)
2018–2019	→ Alloa Athletic (loan)	23	(0)
2019–2021	Ayr United	35	(1)
2021–2023	Linfield	57	(4)
2023–2024	Altrincham	22	(0)
2024–2026	Linfield	30	(3)
2026–	Corpus Christi	30	(1)
- * Club domestic league appearances and goals as of 17:51, 31 October 2026 (UTC)

Sam Roscoe-Byrne (born 16 June 1998) is an English professional footballer who plays as a defender for USL League One club Corpus Christi.

== Career ==
=== Aberdeen ===
Roscoe's career began within the Aberdeen Youth Academy with him rising through the ranks until he signed a professional contract in June 2016. In total he made 4 appearances for Aberdeens U20/U21 side in the Challenge Cup between 2016 and 2018, however he failed to make an appearance for the first team, but his future looked promising so Aberdeen looked to loan him out for the 2018–19 season.

==== Alloa Athletic loan ====
On 30 August 2018, Roscoe moved to Scottish Championship team Alloa Athletic on loan. The loan was extended on 8 January 2019, for the remainder of the season making a total of 25 appearances.

=== Ayr United ===
On 13 June 2019, Roscoe signed a two-year deal with Ayr United. Roscoe made his debut for Ayr United on 13 July against Berwick Rangers in the Scottish League Cup which they won 7–0. Roscoe scored his first senior goal in September, against Wrexham A.F.C. in the Scottish Challenge Cup in a 1–1 draw.

=== Linfield ===
Roscoe signed a two-year contract with Linfield in June 2021.

=== Altrincham ===
On 16 June 2023, Roscoe signed for National League club Altrincham.

=== Return to Linfield ===
On 12 June 2024, it was announced that Roscoe had returned to Linfield for an undisclosed fee.

On 5 February 2026, he departed the club by mutual consent to pursue an opportunity in the United States with Corpus Christi.

== Career statistics ==
As of 10 November 2020

Appearances and goals by club, season and competition
Club	Season	League			Scottish Cup		League Cup		Other		Total	
Club	Season	Division	Apps	Goals	Apps	Goals	Apps	Goals	Apps	Goals	Apps	Goals
Aberdeen	2016–17	Scottish Premiership	0	0	0	0	0	0	0	0	0	0
Aberdeen	2017–18	Scottish Premiership	0	0	0	0	0	0	0	0	0	0
Aberdeen	2018–19	Scottish Premiership	0	0	0	0	0	0	0	0	0	0
Aberdeen	Total		0	0	0	0	0	0	0	0	0	0
Aberdeen U20/U21 (Note: Appearances in the Scottish Challenge Cup, in which age-restricted teams from the Scottish Premiership clubs compete against senior clubs.)	2016–17		—						2	0	2	0
Aberdeen U20/U21	2017–18		—						1	0	1	0
Aberdeen U20/U21	2018–19		—						1	0	1	0
Aberdeen U20/U21	Total		0	0	0	0	0	0	4	0	4	0
Alloa Athletic (loan)	2018–19	Scottish Championship	23	0	1	0	0	0	1	0	25	0
Ayr United	2019–20	Scottish Championship	20	1	2	0	3	0	1	1	26	2
Ayr United	2020-21	Scottish Championship	4	0	3	0	0	0	0	0	7	0
Ayr United	Total		24	1	5	0	3	0	1	1	33	2
Altrincham	2023–24	National League	0	0	0	0	0	0	0	0	0	0
Career total			304	69	10	0	1	0	36	17	351	84
Career total			43	1	3	0	3	0	6	1	55	2
