= Patrick Langlois =

American soccer player (born 1999)

Personal information
- Full name: Patrick Langlois
- Date of birth: October 28, 1999 (age 27)
- Place of birth: San Diego, California, United States
- Height: 1.79 m (5 ft 10 in)
- Positions: Defender; midfielder

Team information
- Current team: Corpus Christi FC
- Number: 7

Youth career
- 2016: Broadmeadow Magic
- 2017: Newcastle Jets

Senior career*
Years	Team	Apps	(Gls)
2017–2020	Newcastle Jets NPL	39	(1)
2018–2020	Newcastle Jets	7	(0)
2021	Hume City	18	(0)
2022–2023	South Melbourne	56	(18)
2024	Northern Colorado Hailstorm	21	(1)
2025	Portland Hearts of Pine	27	(1)
2026–	Corpus Christi FC	32	(1)
- * Club domestic league appearances and goals as of October 31, 2026

Patrick "Paddy" Langlois (born October 28, 1999) is an American professional soccer player who plays as a defender and midfielder for USL League One club Corpus Christi FC.

== Club career ==
=== Newcastle Jets ===
Langlois was born in San Diego, but raised in Newcastle, New South Wales, Australia and began his career in the academy of Newcastle Jets. On April 20, 2019, Langlois made his first senior professional appearance coming on as a substitute for Newcastle Jets FC in a 6–1 win over Brisbane Roar. He made eight senior appearances for the Jets across two seasons before departing in 2021.

=== Hume City ===
Langlois joined Hume City FC in 2021, appearing in eight matches for the National Premier Leagues Victoria side.

=== South Melbourne ===
After one season with Hume City, Langlois joined South Melbourne FC, also in National Premier Leagues Victoria for the 2022 season. He spent two seasons with Hellas, scoring 18 goals.

=== Northern Colorado Hailstorm ===
Langlois returned to the United States and joined USL League One side Northern Colorado Hailstorm on January 11, 2024. Hailstorm FC left League One following the 2024 season.

=== Portland Hearts of Pine ===
Langlois remained in USL League One, signing for expansion side Portland Hearts of Pine on January 10, 2025. He became the club's first captain ahead of their first match. He scored the club's first ever league goal on April 12 in a 2–1 defeat to South Georgia Tormenta FC.

=== Corpus Christi FC ===
Langlois joined his third USL League One club in as many seasons, signing for Corpus Christi FC on January 21, 2026.

== Career statistics ==
As of April 20, 2019

Club	Season	Division	League		Cup		Continental		Other		Total	
Club	Season	Division	Apps	Goals	Apps	Goals	Apps	Goals	Apps	Goals	Apps	Goals
Newcastle Jets Youth	2017	NPL NNSW	19	0	—		—		—		19	0
Newcastle Jets Youth	2018	NPL NNSW	3	0	—		—		—		3	0
Newcastle Jets Youth	2019	NPL NNSW	11	1	—		—		—		11	1
Newcastle Jets Youth	2020	NPL 2 NSW	5	0	—		—		—		5	0
Newcastle Jets Youth	2020	NPL 4 NSW	1	0	—		—		—		1	0
Newcastle Jets Youth	Jets Youth Total		39	1	0	0	0	0			39	1
Newcastle Jets	2018–19	A-League	1	0	—		—		—		1	0
Newcastle Jets	2019–20	A-League	6	0	1	0	—		—		7	0
Newcastle Jets	Newcastle Jets Total		7	0	1	0	0	0			8	0
Hume City	2021	NPL Victoria	18	0	0	0	—		—		18	0
South Melbourne	2022	NPL Victoria	28	10	0	0	—		—		28	10
South Melbourne	2023	NPL Victoria	28	8	0	0	—		—		28	8
South Melbourne	South Melbourne Total		56	18	0	0	0	0			56	18
Northern Colorado Hailstorm	2024	USL League One	22	1	2	0	—		9	0	33	1
Portland Hearts of Pine	2025	USL League One	29	1	3	0	—		3	0	35	1
Corpus Christi	2026	USL League One	26	1	0	0	—		3	0	29	1
Career Total			179	22	6	0	0	0	15	0	200	22
