= Anthony Patti =

Brazilian footballer (born 2002)

Personal information
- Full name: Anthony Michael Cunha Patti
- Date of birth: 28 November 2002 (age 23)
- Place of birth: Salvador, Bahia, Brazil
- Height: 6 ft 2 in (1.88 m)
- Position: Defender

Team information
- Current team: Greenville Triumph
- Number: 15

College career
Years	Team	Apps	(Gls)
2021	Mercer Bears	10	(0)
2022	UTRGV Vaqueros	24	(2)

Senior career*
Years	Team	Apps	(Gls)
2023	Albion San Diego	26	(4)
2024	Lexington SC	5	(0)
2025–	Greenville Triumph	44	(2)
- * Club domestic league appearances and goals as of October 31, 2026

Anthony Patti (born November 28, 2002) is a Brazilian professional footballer who plays as a defender for USL League One club Greenville Triumph.

== Career ==
=== University ===
Patti played his freshman year at Mercer University, making ten appearances. He then transferred to University of Texas Rio Grande Valley, where he made 11 appearances with two goals in the 2022 season.

=== Professional ===
Patti signed with NISA side Albion San Diego ahead of the 2023 season. He made 23 starts for the club with one goal and an assist. He was released by Lexington following their 2024 season.

Patti joined Greenville Triumph in January 2025.

== Personal life ==
Patti was born in Salvador, Bahia, Brazil before emigrating with his family to the Dallas, Texas area of the US at the age of five.
