= Corpus Christi FC =

Soccer club based in Corpus Christi, Texas

- Nickname: The Sharks
- Founded: 2017; 9 years ago
- Stadium: Cabaniss Athletic Complex; Corpus Christi, Texas
- Owner: Kingsley Okonkwo
- Coach: Éamon Zayed
- League: USL League One
- 2026: USL League One, 12th of 17
- Website: corpuscfc.com
Home colors	Away colors

Corpus Christi FC is a professional men's soccer club based in Corpus Christi, Texas. It most recently competed in USL League One, a Division 3 league in the United States league system. The club was founded in 2017, and its colors are blue, red, and white. The club also runs a youth academy program for both boys and girls that has programs ranging from U3s to U19s. and has affiliate academies in Victoria, Texas and Allen, Texas.

== History ==
Corpus Christi was awarded an expansion franchise by the Premier Development League in October 2017. The team began playing in the 2018 PDL season. In 2019, the Sharks finished runners-up of the Mid-South division, and were the second-highest scoring club in the entire league. In 2020, the outfit announced their ambitions to go professional in USL League One as the city council approved a five-year incentive agreement worth $1.85 million as an investment consortium involving the team's owner and president Dr. Kingsley Okonkwo set out to build a $28 million sporting complex that would include a 5,000 seater ground.

In October 2024, USL League One officially awarded Corpus Christi FC franchise rights for a professional club. In October 2025, the team announced Éamon Zayed as their first head coach and sporting director for the upcoming USL League One season.

On October 25, 2026, it was reported that Corpus Christi FC would depart USL League One after competing in the league for a single season. USL President and CEO Paul McDonough confirmed in a November 13 interview with Goal that Corpus Christi would not return to League One for the 2027 season after failing to meet the league's requirements.

== Players and staff ==
As of March 12, 2026.

=== Players ===
Note: Flags indicate national team as defined under FIFA eligibility rules; some limited exceptions apply. Players may hold more than one non-FIFA nationality.

No.	Pos.	Nation	Player
1	GK	IRL	James Talbot
2	DF	USA	Blake Bowen
3	DF	ARG	Tomas Ritondale
4	MF	IRL	Jack Keaney
5	DF	ENG	Sam Roscoe
6	MF	USA	Paddy Langlois
7	MF	TTO	Kaihim Thomas
8	MF	GER	Jackson Dietrich
9	FW	USA	Christian Chaney
10	MF	ESA	Alexis Cerritos
11	FW	COL	Leyder Robledo
12	FW	USA	Jake Keegan

No.	Pos.	Nation	Player
15	MF	USA	James Parks
17	FW	USA	Manzi Shalita
19	MF	USA	Kyle Barganski
20	DF	USA	Pierce Infuso
21	FW	ESP	Nacho Abeal
22	DF	TTO	Shannon Gomez
24	GK	SCO	Mason McCready
26	MF	USA	Bubu Medina
27	MF	USA	Tomas Pondeca
28	GK	USA	Bill Hamid
30	MF	JAM	Andrew Booth
33	MF	GHA	Enock Kwakwa

=== Staff ===
As of October 16, 2025.

- Éamon Zayed – Head coach & Sporting director
- Manuel Iwabuchi – Assistant coach

== Record ==
As of October 2025.

Season	GP	Record (W-T-L)	GF	GA	Pts	League	Regular season	Playoffs
2018	14	6–6–2	32	32	20	USL PDL	4th, Mid South	did not qualify
2019	14	8–2–4	43	28	26	USL League Two	2nd, Mid South	did not qualify
2020	Season cancelled due to the COVID-19 pandemic					USL League Two	Cancelled	
2021	13	7–2–4	20	15	23	USL League Two	2nd, Mid South	Conf. Quarterfinals
2022	14	7–1–6	21	21	22	USL League Two	3rd, Lone Star	did not qualify
2023	12	5–3–4	30	21	18	USL League Two	3rd, Lone Star	did not qualify
2024	12	10–1–1	45	14	31	USL League Two	1st, Lone Star	Conf. Finals
2025	12	6–3–3	22	15	21	USL League Two	2nd, Lone Star	did not qualify
Total	91	49-18-24	213	146	161	-	-	-
