= Shannon Gomez =

Trinidadian footballer (born 1996)

Personal information
- Full name: Shannon Gomez
- Date of birth: 5 October 1996 (age 30)
- Place of birth: San Fernando, Trinidad and Tobago
- Height: 1.73 m (5 ft 8 in)
- Position: Right-back

Team information
- Current team: Corpus Christi FC
- Number: 33

Youth career
- Waterloo Institute
- Cap Off Youths
- St Mary's United
- 2011–2014: San Juan Jabloeth

Senior career*
Years	Team	Apps	(Gls)
2014–2016	W Connection	2	(0)
2016	→ New York City FC (loan)	0	(0)
2017	New York City FC	0	(0)
2017	→ Pittsburgh Riverhounds (loan)	10	(0)
2018–2021	Sacramento Republic	77	(0)
2022–2026	San Antonio FC	87	(2)
2026	Tormenta FC	0	(0)
2026–	Corpus Christi FC	31	(0)

International career^{‡}
2012–2013	Trinidad and Tobago U17	6	(0)
2012–2015	Trinidad and Tobago U20	6	(0)
2015	Trinidad and Tobago U21	1	(0)
2015	Trinidad and Tobago U22	3	(0)
2015–	Trinidad and Tobago	16	(0)
- * Club domestic league appearances and goals as of 31 October 2026 ‡ National team caps and goals as of 7 June 2024

Shannon Gomez (born 5 October 1996) is a Trinidadian professional footballer who plays as a right-back for USL League One club Corpus Christi and the Trinidad and Tobago national team.

== Club career ==
=== Youth ===
Gomez attended Carapichaima RC Primary and St Augustine Secondary School as a child. Representing St Augustine as captain, he lifted the Intercol title in 2013 after beating Fatima College.

He later lined-up for Waterloo Institute, before earning a move to Cap Off Youths. Gomez also played for St Mary's United, before joining San Juan Jabloeth.

=== Professional ===
He joined TT Pro League club W Connection in August 2014, finishing second in his inaugural season and qualifying for the 2016 CFU Club Championship preliminary round. Gomez played every minute of the Savonetta Boys four-game run in the 2015–16 CONCACAF Champions League, notably recording a 2–1 victory over Costa Rican club Deportivo Saprissa.

In March 2016, Gomez joined MLS side New York City FC as a Discovery Signing on loan from W Connection. He joined the club for their final pre-season camp of 2016 and later signed a contract with the club. Gomez holds a green card holder, meaning he does not require an international roster spot. New York City FC have the option to sign the right-back ahead of the 2017 MLS campaign.

He was named on the bench in a 0–0 draw with Chicago Fire on 11 April, but did not make his first team debut. Gomez will return to Trinidad & Tobago club W Connection on 31 December 2016.

On 28 November 2016 NYCFC announced they had exercised their option to make Gomez a permanent squad member. Gomez was released by NYCFC on 27 November 2017.

On 7 February 2018, Gomez joined the Sacramento Republic of the United Soccer League. On November 17, 2020, Sacramento exercised the option on Gomez's contract, retaining him for the 2021 season. Gomez was released by Sacramento following the 2021 season.

On 13 January 2022, Gomez signed with USL Championship side San Antonio FC.

== International career ==
Gomez's first international involvement came with the Trinidad & Tobago Under-17s in July 2015, 2012, making his debut in a 23–0 win over British Virgin Islands Under-17s. He made a further five appearances for the youth side, with his last cap coming in April 2013.

He made his debut for the Trinidad & Tobago Under-20s on January 10, 2015, in a 2–2 draw with Jamaica Under-20s. He soon gained a further four caps as captain during the month. Gomez played a single minute for the Under-21s in a 3–0 win over St Vincent & The Grenadines in August 2013, and made his debut for the Trinidad & Tobago Under-22s on July 13, 2015, appearing in a 4–0 defeat to Uruguay Under-22s. He also played in defeats to Paraguay Under-22s and Mexico Under-22s.

He made his international debut for Trinidad & Tobago on March 28, 2015, in a 1–0 friendly defeat to Panama. He played for 77 minutes before being replaced by Jomal Williams. Gomez made his second international appearance in a friendly on June 6, 2015, featuring for seven minutes in a 1–0 loss to Curaçao.

In June 2023 Gomez was named to the Trinidad squad ahead of the 2023 CONCACAF Gold Cup.
