= Néstor Monge =

Costa Rican football player and lawyer (born 1990)

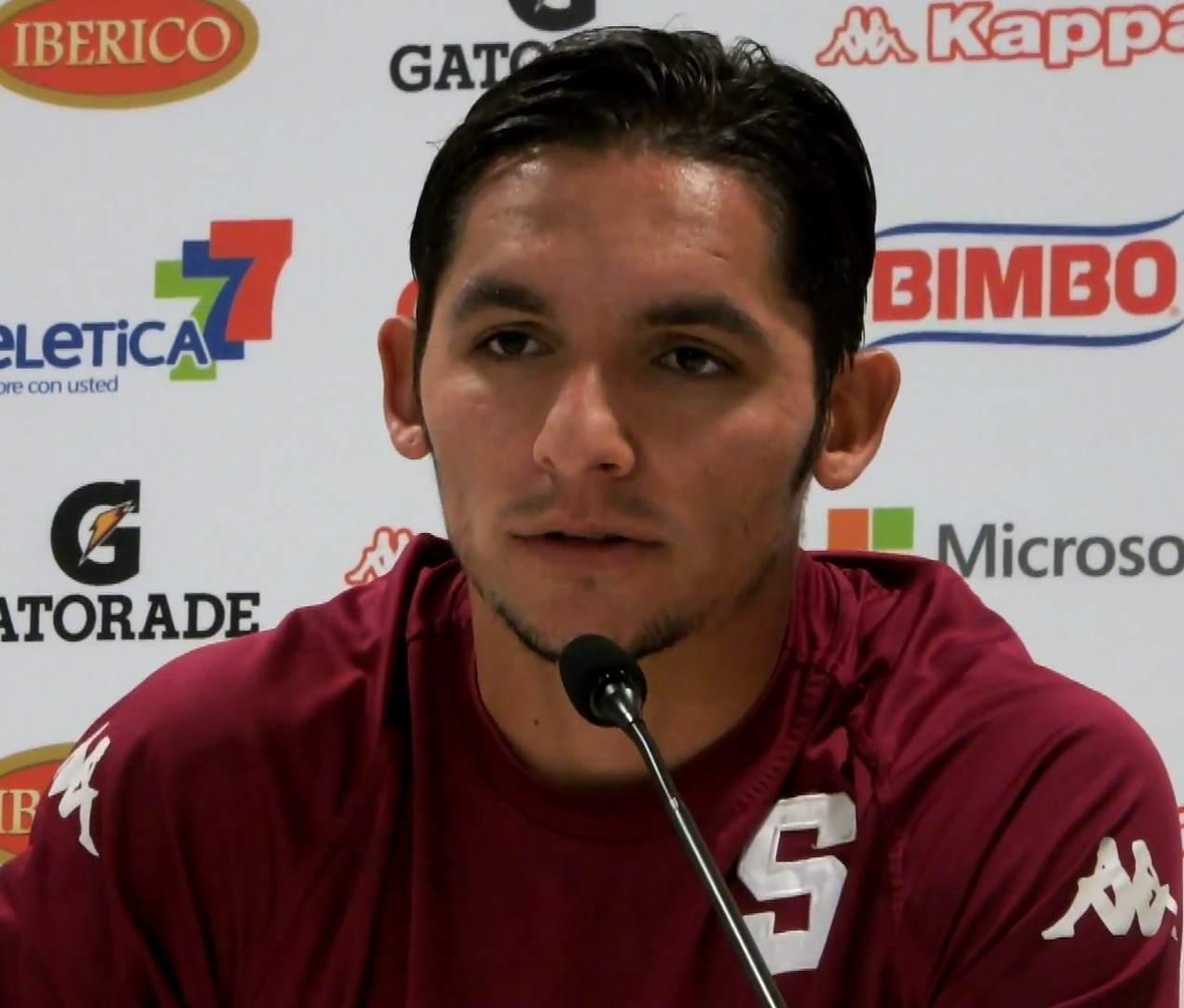

Personal information
- Full name: Néstor William Monge Guevara
- Date of birth: 7 January 1990 (age 36)
- Place of birth: San Isidro de El General, Pérez Zeledón, Costa Rica
- Height: 1.76 m (5 ft 9 in)
- Position: Midfielder

Team information
- Current team: RFCU Union
- Number: 30

Senior career*
Years	Team	Apps	(Gls)
2008–2013	Pérez Zeledón	104	(4)
2013–2015	Cartaginés	48	(2)
2015–2016	Deportivo Saprissa	38	(0)
2016–2019	Cartaginés	81	(3)
2017	→ Comunicaciones (loan)	14	(1)
2019	UAEM	11	(1)
2019	Cafetaleros de Chiapas	5	(0)
2020	Pérez Zeledón	13	(0)
2021	Jicaral	14	(0)
2021	Guastatoya	4	(0)
2021-22	Pérez Zeledón	28	(2)
2022–2023	Guadalupe	43	(2)
2023–2024	Differdange	22	(0)
2024–2026	RFCU Union	51	(7)

International career
2012–	Costa Rica	6	(0)
- * Club domestic league appearances and goals as of 27 May 2026

Nestor Monge (born 7 January 1990) is a Costa Rican professional footballer who last played for BGL Ligue side RFCU Union.

== Club career ==
Monge was signed to play for Valour FC in the Canadian Premier League ahead of their 2021 season but the move fell through over VISA issues. Monge rejoined his first club Pérez Zeledón FC in 2021, for the third time but left again in June, 2022. In July, 2022 Monge was signed to play for Guadalupe.

On 5 July 2023, Monge signed a contract with Luxembourg club Differdange. Monge joined Racing FC Union Luxembourg in mid-2024, and went to play 60 matches in all competitions for club and scored 7 goals. He left the club in May 2026.

== International career ==
Monge made his debut for the Costa Rica national football team against Jamaica on the 22 March 2012 in Kingston, Jamaica. Monge remained on the fringes of the Costa Rica national team and made a playing return on 2 February 2019 appearing as a substitute against the USMNT at PayPal Park in San Jose, California.
