= Amir Soto =

Panamanian footballer (born 1997)

Personal information
- Full name: Amir Amizis Soto Espinoza
- Date of birth: 4 November 1997 (age 29)
- Place of birth: Panama City, Panama
- Height: 1.90 m (6 ft 3 in)
- Position: Centre-back

Senior career*
Years	Team	Apps	(Gls)
2018	Ringkøbing		
2019	Universitario	10	(0)
2020–2021	Valour FC	5	(0)
- * Club domestic league appearances and goals as of 27 October 2021

Amir Amizis Soto Espinoza (born 4 November 1997) is a Panamanian professional footballer.

== Early life ==
Soto was born in Panama City, Panama. In 2018, he signed with Danish 2nd Division side Ringkøbing.

== Club career ==
=== Universitario ===
In 2019, Soto returned to Panama and played for Liga Panameña side Universitario, making ten appearances.

=== Valour FC ===
On 7 February 2020, Soto signed with Canadian Premier League side Valour FC. On 30 June 2021, he made his debut as a substitute in a 2–0 win over HFX Wanderers. In January 2022 Valour announced that Soto was departing the club.

== International career ==
In late 2018, Soto received his first call-up to the Panama national team for a friendly against Venezuela, but did not appear in the match.
