= Andrew Booth (soccer) =

Jamaican footballer (born 1997)

Personal information
- Date of birth: 16 July 1997 (age 29)
- Place of birth: Kingston, Jamaica
- Height: 1.80 m (5 ft 11 in)
- Positions: Midfielder; defender

Team information
- Current team: Corpus Christi FC
- Number: 30

Youth career
- 2005–2014: Plantation Academy
- 2014–2015: Kendall SC

College career
Years	Team	Apps	(Gls)
2015–2019	FIU Panthers	51	(7)

Senior career*
Years	Team	Apps	(Gls)
2016	Fort Lauderdale Strikers U23		
2017	South Florida Surf	9	(1)
2018	North County United	3	(1)
2020–2021	Greenville Triumph	34	(3)
2022–2023	Charleston Battery	47	(6)
2024	Miami FC	16	(1)
2024–2025	FC Tulsa	21	(2)
2026–	Corpus Christi FC	17	(1)
- * Club domestic league appearances and goals as of October 31, 2026

Andrew Booth (born 16 July 1997) is a Jamaican footballer who plays as a midfielder for Corpus Christi FC in the USL League One.

== Career ==
=== Youth, College & Amateur ===
Booth played with the Plantation Academy from 2005 to 2014 and then spent a single season with Kendall Soccer Club.

In 2015, Booth attended Florida International University to play college soccer. He redshirted his 2015 freshman season, but went on to make 51 appearances for the Panthers, scoring 7 goals and tallying 9 assists. During his time at FIU, Booth won accolades such as All-Conference USA Second Team in his junior season and in his senior season recorded a team-high 15 points and won Conference USA Midfielder of the Year honors and a position on the All-CUSA First Team.

While at college, Booth also played in the NPSL and USL PDL. He appeared for Fort Lauderdale Strikers U23 in the NPSL in 2016, and PDL sides South Florida Surf and Treasure Coast Tritons in 2017 and 2018 respectively.

=== Professional career ===
On January 13, 2020, Booth was selected 96th overall in the 2020 MLS SuperDraft by Minnesota United. However, he was not signed by the club.

On September 11, 2020, Booth signed with USL League One side Greenville Triumph. He made his debut two days later, appearing as an 84th-minute substitute during a 2–0 win over Forward Madison.

On January 28, 2021, Booth's MLS rights were traded from Minnesota to CF Montréal, who in return received the rights to Jukka Raitala.

Booth signed with Charleston Battery of the USL Championship on January 3, 2022. In his second season with the Battery, Booth helped the club reach the 2023 USL Championship Final. His contract option was declined by Charleston following the 2023 season.

On February 10, 2024, Booth joined USL Championship side Miami FC. He transferred to FC Tulsa on July 10, 2024.

=== International ===
In February 2016, Booth was called up to the Jamaica under-20 national team training camp. However, to date has not been capped by Jamaica at any level.
