= Jackson Dietrich =

German footballer (born 1996)

Personal information
- Date of birth: 27 September 1996 (age 30)
- Place of birth: Bremen, Germany
- Height: 1.84 m (6 ft 0 in)
- Positions: Midfielder; forward

Team information
- Current team: Corpus Christi
- Number: 8

Youth career
- Werder Bremen
- FC Oberneuland
- Las Vegas Sports Academy

College career
Years	Team	Apps	(Gls)
2015–2019	Wright State Raiders	78	(15)

Senior career*
Years	Team	Apps	(Gls)
2017–2019	Dayton Dutch Lions	25	(7)
2021	Chattanooga Red Wolves	20	(2)
2022–2024	Northern Colorado Hailstorm	56	(1)
2025	Forward Madison	6	(0)
2026–	Corpus Christi	18	(0)
- * Club domestic league appearances and goals as of October 31, 2026

Jackson Dietrich (born 27 September 1996) is a German professional footballer who plays as a midfielder or forward for USL League One side Corpus Christi.

== Career ==
=== Youth ===
Dietrich was born in Bremen in Germany, and was part of the Werder Bremen and FC Oberneuland academy systems. When his family moved to the United States, Dietrich played for the Las Vegas Sports Academy where he helped lead them to four state championships and a 2014 Region IV title.

=== College and amateur ===
Dietrich spent four years playing college soccer at Wright State University between 2015 and 2019, missing the 2017 season due to injury. During his time with the Raiders, Dietrich made 78 appearances, scoring 14 goals and tallying 34 assists, helping the team to a Horizon League Title in his senior year.

Whilst at college, Dietrich also played in the USL League Two for Dayton Dutch Lions in both 2018 and 2019.

=== Professional ===
On 9 December 2020, Dietrich joined USL League One side Chattanooga Red Wolves ahead of their 2021 season. He made his debut on 8 May 2021, appearing as a 63rd-minute substitute during a 1–0 win over North Texas SC.

On 21 July 2022, Dietrich signed with USL League One club Northern Colorado Hailstorm.

After two seasons with Northern Colorado, Dietrich signed with USL League One club Forward Madison prior to the 2025 season.

In January 2026, Dietrich joined fellow USL League One club Corpus Christi ahead of the club's first professional season.
