= Enock Kwakwa =

Ghanaian footballer (born 1994)

Personal information
- Date of birth: 2 July 1994 (age 32)
- Place of birth: Accra, Ghana
- Height: 1.69 m (5 ft 7 in)
- Position: Midfielder

Team information
- Current team: Corpus Christi
- Number: 33

Youth career
- Right to Dream Academy
- Manchester City

Senior career*
| Years | Team | Apps | (Gls) |
| 2012–2014 | Manchester City | 0 | (0) |
| 2012–2013 | → Strømsgodset (loan) | 1 | (0) |
| 2012–2013 | → TPS (loan) | 0 | (0) |
| 2014 | Ull/Kisa | 17 | (3) |
| 2015–2018 | Falkenbergs FF | 63 | (2) |
| 2019–2021 | Jönköpings Södra IF | 40 | (0) |
| 2022 | Charleston Battery | 19 | (2) |
| 2023–2024 | Northern Colorado Hailstorm | 38 | (0) |
| 2025 | Skövde AIK | 21 | (1) |
| 2026– | Corpus Christi | 20 | (2) |
- * Club domestic league appearances and goals as of October 31, 2026

Enock Kwakwa (born 2 July 1994) is a Ghanaian footballer who currently plays for Corpus Christi in USL League One.

== Career ==
=== Manchester City ===
Kwakwa was signed by English club Manchester City in August 2012, and immediately loaned out to Norwegian Tippeligaen club Strømsgodset IF.

=== Strømsgodset ===
Kwakwa arrived at Strømsgodset in September 2012, alongside fellow Right To Dream Academy graduate Bismark Adjei-Boateng. He spent the final months of the 2012 season on the reserves team in the Second Division, and impressed, in particular with a great goal from 40 meters. Unfortunately, he was injured in the 2013 pre-season, and had to train alternatively for four weeks. He made his debut on 13 April 2013, when he played the last 6 minutes in the match against Vålerenga. Unfortunately, he was injured again in June 2013, when he tore a tendon in his thigh. He never played for the first team again during the loan spell, and returned to the English club when he was unable to renew his work permit.

=== TPS ===
He was loaned out to Finnish club TPS in September 2013, but only played one reserve match before the loan deal was canceled.

=== Ullensaker/Kisa ===
On 17 March 2014, he signed a permanent deal with Norwegian First Division club Ull/Kisa, lasting until December 2015. He made his debut for the club on 16 May 2014 in a match against Bryne, and played a total of 17 matches for the club in the 2014 season, scoring 3 goals. After the team was relegated, the player was able to leave the club on a free transfer.

=== Falkenbergs FF ===
On 24 February 2015, Kwakwa signed a short-term deal lasting until 30 June the same year with the Swedish Allsvenskan team Falkenbergs FF, with an option to extend the contract for another three years if the player impresses.

=== Jönköpings Södra IF ===
Jönköpings Södra IF announced on 20 November 2018, that they had signed Kwakwa for the 2019 season.

=== Charleston Battery ===
On 18 March 2022, Kwakwa moved to USL Championship side Charleston Battery who competed in the second-tier of US soccer. Kwakwa scored his first goal with the club on 16 July 2022 in a 3–1 home victory over Hartford Athletic. Following the 2022 season, Kwakwa was released by Charleston.

=== Northern Colorado Hailstorm ===
On 30 January 2023, Kwakwa signed with USL League One side Northern Colorado Hailstorm.
