= Blake Bowen =

American soccer player (born 2000)

Personal information
- Date of birth: November 4, 2000 (age 26)
- Place of birth: Mission Viejo, California, U.S.
- Height: 5 ft 8 in (1.73 m)
- Positions: Full-back; winger

Team information
- Current team: Corpus Christi FC
- Number: 2

Youth career
- 2015–2019: San Clemente High School
- –2019: Orange County Surf
- West Coast FC

College career
Years	Team	Apps	(Gls)
2019–2022	San Diego State Aztecs	58	(9)

Senior career*
Years	Team	Apps	(Gls)
2023–2024	Tacoma Defiance	44	(1)
2025	Huntsville City FC	24	(1)
2026–	Corpus Christi FC	31	(8)
- * Club domestic league appearances and goals as of 14:13, Thursday, November 19, 2026 (UTC)

Blake Bowen (born November 4, 2000) is an American professional soccer player who plays as a full-back and winger for Corpus Christi FC in USL League One.

== Early life and college career ==
Born in Mission Viejo, California, and raised in San Clemente, California, Bowen attended San Clemente High School. During his senior season in 2018–19, he recorded 18 goals and 15 assists to lead the Tritons to both the CIF Southern Section Division I and Southern California Division I Regional titles, earning honors as the Gatorade California Boys Soccer Player of the Year. He also played youth club soccer for Orange County Surf and West Coast FC.

Bowen played four seasons of college soccer for the San Diego State Aztecs from 2019 to 2022. Primarily utilized as a midfielder in college, he appeared in 58 matches (49 starts), scoring nine goals and recording six assists. He received All-Pac-12 Conference honorable mention recognition in 2020 and 2021 before earning All-Pac-12 Second Team and United Soccer Coaches All-Far West Region Third Team honors as a senior in 2022.

== Club career ==
=== Tacoma Defiance ===
Bowen was selected 59th overall in the third round of the 2023 MLS SuperDraft by Seattle Sounders FC and was subsequently signed by their MLS Next Pro affiliate, Tacoma Defiance. Transitioning into a full-back role, he made 25 appearances across the regular season and playoffs during his rookie campaign in 2023, tallying one goal and six assists—including a goal and two assists in a Western Conference Quarterfinal match against Houston Dynamo 2. He remained a regular starter in 2024, logging 19 appearances and three assists across the season.

=== Huntsville City FC ===
Ahead of the 2025 MLS Next Pro season, Bowen joined Huntsville City FC, the reserve affiliate of Nashville SC. He served as team captain during his lone season in Alabama, making 24 appearances while contributing one goal and one assist.

=== Corpus Christi FC ===
On February 13, 2026, Bowen signed with Corpus Christi FC ahead of the club's inaugural professional campaign in USL League One. Head coach Éamon Zayed deployed him both at full-back and further forward on the wing.

Bowen quickly emerged as the Sharks' primary offensive catalyst during their expansion season. Bowen scored his first goal for Corpus Christi FC on April 22, 2026, in a 2–1 USL League One road loss against Sarasota Paradise. Despite being nominated for the 2026 USL League One Mid-Season Defender of the Year award, he was not selected to the 2026 USL League One All-League First or Second Teams.Across 31 league appearances (30 starts), Bowen recorded eight goals and nine assists—finishing the 2026 campaign as Corpus Christi FC's leading goal scorer in both league play (8 goals) and all competitions (9 goals).

== Career statistics ==
As of November 19, 2026

Appearances and goals by club, season and competition
Club	Season	League			National cup		League cup		Other		Total	
Club	Season	Division	Apps	Goals	Apps	Goals	Apps	Goals	Apps	Goals	Apps	Goals
Tacoma Defiance	2023	MLS Next Pro	23	0	—	—	—	—	2 (Note: Appearances in MLS Next Pro playoffs)	1	25	1
Tacoma Defiance	2024	MLS Next Pro	19	0	0	0	—	—	—	—	19	0
Tacoma Defiance	Total		42	0	0	0	—	—	2	1	44	1
Huntsville City FC	2025	MLS Next Pro	24	1	—	—	—	—	—	—	24	1
Corpus Christi FC	2026	USL League One	31	8	0	0	4 (Note: Appearances in USL Cup)	1	—	—	35	9
Career total			97	9	0	0	4	1	2	1	103	11

== Honors ==
High School

- Gatorade California Boys Soccer Player of the Year: 2018–19
- CIF Southern Section Division I Player of the Year: 2018–19

College

- All-Pac-12 Second Team: 2022
- United Soccer Coaches All-Far West Region Third Team: 2022
