= GE Vernova Park =

Soccer stadium in South Carolina, US

- Interactive map of GE Vernova Park
- Full name: GE Verona Park
- Former names: Mauldin Stadium at BridgeWay Station
- Address: 1000 Via Corso Ave, Mauldin, SC 29681
- Coordinates: 34°47′41″N 82°16′53″W
- Capacity: 6,300
- Surface: Turf

Construction
- Groundbreaking: March 12, 2025
- Built: 2025–2026
- Opened: June 2, 2026
- Cost: US$80,000,000–$100,000,000
- Architect: Johnston Design Group
- Structural engineers: Britt Peters & Associates, Inc.
- Services engineers: Site Design Inc. & Strange Bros. Grading Co., Inc.
- General contractor: Edifice Construction

Tenants
- Greenville Triumph SC (USL1) 2026–present Greenville Liberty SC (USLW) 2026–present

GE Vernova Park is an 6,300-seat soccer-specific stadium in Mauldin, South Carolina. It is home to Greenville Triumph SC, a member of USL League One, and their sister women's side Greenville Liberty SC, a member of USL W League. The stadium is located next to the BridgeWay Station district and was completed in Spring 2026.

== Development ==
=== Planning and funding ===
A search for a site for a permanent home for the Greenville Triumph had been going on since at least 2020. A six-acre site in Maldin was announced on January 28, 2022 at BridgeWay Station for an 8,100 seat, multi-sport stadium, which was slated to be ready for the 2023 USL League One stadium. However, the Greenville County Council finance committee rejected the proposal, and the site continued to sit unutilized.

On October 30, 2024, after a two-year delay, Greenville Pro Soccer announced that plans for a 10,000-seat stadium (expanded from the prior 8,100-seat plan) at the same site, following an amended funding proposal. The multi-use venue will be home to both the Triumph and the Greenville Liberty. It is expected to be completed in 2026 with an estimated cost of US$80–$100 million. Around $10 million of funding is coming from the State of South Carolina $4.25 million in hospitality, with additional tax revenue and bonds being given to help fund the stadium.

The design of the stadium was decided to be built in the medieval European style to match up with the rest of the BridgeWay Station district's architecture. Although the stadium was planned to host over ten thousand fans in original plans, it was ultimately decided in final plans that the stadium would be downsized to 4,300 seats and an ultimate capacity of 6,300 to offer up a more intimate gameday experience.

GE Vernona was announced as the naming rights sponsor of the stadium on November 15, 2025.

=== Construction ===
A ground-breaking event was held at the future stadium site on March 12, 2025, whilst actual construction officially began the same year on September 23. Edifice Construction was chosen to be the general contractor, and Johnston Design Group were selected to be the architects of the stadium.

Due to the stadium not being able to have been completed in time for the 2026 USL League One season start, the Triumph will play three games at Eugene Stone Soccer Stadium at the start of the season, before being able to play their first home match at the stadium in early May.
