= 2019 FC Edmonton season =

FC Edmonton
2019 season
- General manager: Jay Ball
- Head coach: Jeff Paulus
- Stadium: Clarke Stadium
- Canadian Premier League: Spring: 3rd Fall: 6th Overall: 4th
- Canadian Championship: Second qualifying round
- Top goalscorer: League: Easton Ongaro (10 goals); All: Easton Ongaro (10 goals)
- Highest home attendance: 4,238 (May 12 vs. Pacific FC)
- Lowest home attendance: 2,021 (July 27 vs. Forge FC)
- Average home league attendance: League: 2,905; All: 2,849
Home colours	Away colours

The 2019 FC Edmonton season was the eighth season in the club's history, as well as the first season in Canadian Premier League history.

== Overview ==
After finishing in seventh place in the 2017 NASL season, FC Edmonton discontinued professional operations, but kept their academy. Co-owner Tom Fath stated that the franchise had proved to be unsustainable in the Edmonton market, and the decision was reinforced by the uncertainty surrounding the status of the NASL. Despite these events, there was speculation that the still under construction Canadian Premier League was looking at Edmonton as a potential market. That speculation proved to be correct on June 8, 2018, when it was announced that Edmonton had come out of hiatus and officially joined the new league. A new logo was revealed, and it was announced that the team would continue to play at Clarke Stadium.

On July 3, 2018, Jeff Paulus was named head coach. He had formerly been an assistant coach for the first team and technical director of the academy. On November 28, FC Edmonton announced their first two signings as members of the CPL, academy graduate Allan Zebie, who played for the team in 2017, and former Vancouver Whitecap Randy Edwini-Bonsu, who played minor soccer in Edmonton as a child. The Eddies signed more academy graduates, including Bruno Zebie, Ajeej Sarkaria and Ajay Khabra. On December 13, South Korean midfielder Son Yong-chan was signed, Edmonton's first international signing as a Canadian Premier League club.

== Squad ==
As of October 19, 2019.

No.	Name	Nationality	Position(s)	Date of birth (age)	Previous club
Goalkeepers
1	Connor James	(Canada)	GK	July 17, 1996 (aged 23)	(Canada) Alberta Golden Bears
13	Dylon Powley	(Canada)	GK	September 5, 1996 (aged 23)	(Sweden) Gute
31	Chris Ezoua	(Canada)	GK	March 26, 2000 (aged 19)	Academy
Defenders
3	Jeannot Esua	(Cameroon)	RB / RW	August 6, 1996 (aged 23)	(Cameroon) Rainbow Bamenda
4	Allan Zebie	(Canada)	LB	May 29, 1993 (aged 26)	(Canada) FC Edmonton (NASL)
5	Ramón Soria	(Spain)	CB / DM	March 7, 1989 (aged 30)	(Spain) Formentera
8	Mélé Temguia	(Germany)	CB	August 1, 1995 (aged 24)	(Australia) Valentine Phoenix
12	Kareem Moses	(Trinidad and Tobago)	RB	February 11, 1990 (aged 29)	(Finland) FF Jaro
55	Amer Didic	(Canada)	CB	December 28, 1994 (aged 25)	(United States) San Antonio FC
Midfielders
6	Edem Mortotsi	(Ghana)	CM	May 16, 1993 (aged 26)	(Canada) FC Edmonton (NASL)
7	Son Yong-chan	(South Korea)	CM	April 15, 1991 (aged 28)	(India) Ozone
10	Philippe Lincourt-Joseph	(Canada)	AM	November 1, 1994 (aged 25)	(Oman) Al-Rustaq
14	James Marcelin	(Haiti)	DM / CB	June 13, 1986 (aged 33)	(United States) Miami United
16	Prince Amanda	(Canada)	LW / RW	March 23, 2001 (aged 18)	Academy
17	Marcus Velado-Tsegaye	(Canada)	LW / RW / ST	July 1, 2001 (aged 18)	Academy
20	Bruno Zebie	(Canada)	LM	August 14, 1995 (aged 24)	(Canada) Calgary Foothills
22	Tony Tchani	(Cameroon)	CM	April 13, 1989 (aged 30)	(United States) Chicago Fire
23	Ajay Khabra	(Canada)	CM	June 13, 1995 (aged 24)	(Canada) Alberta Golden Bears
Forwards
9	Ajeej Sarkaria	(Canada)	ST	February 7, 1995 (aged 24)	(Canada) Alberta Golden Bears
11	Randy Edwini-Bonsu	(Canada)	ST / LW / RW	April 20, 1990 (aged 29)	(Germany) Tennis Borussia Berlin
18	Tomi Ameobi	(England)	CF	August 16, 1988 (aged 31)	(United States) FC Cincinnati
19	Easton Ongaro	(Canada)	ST	June 5, 1998 (aged 21)	(Canada) Alberta Golden Bears
26	David Doe	(Canada)	ST	November 30, 2000 (aged 19)	(Canada) FC Edmonton (NASL)
45	Oumar Diouck	(Belgium)	ST	November 9, 1994 (aged 25)	(Belgium) KVK Tienen

== Transfers ==
=== In ===
==== Transferred in ====
No.	Pos.	Player	Transferred from	Fee/notes	Date	Source
11	FW	(Canada) Randy Edwini-Bonsu	(Germany) Tennis Borussia Berlin	Free Transfer	November 29, 2018	
4	DF	(Canada) Allan Zebie	Unattached	Free Transfer	November 29, 2018	
7	MF	(South Korea) Son Yong-chan	(India) Ozone	Free Transfer	December 13, 2018	
20	MF	(Canada) Bruno Zebie	(Canada) Calgary Foothills	Free Transfer	December 13, 2018	
23	MF	(Canada) Ajay Khabra	(Canada) Alberta Golden Bears	Free Transfer	December 13, 2018	
9	FW	(Canada) Ajeej Sarkaria	(Canada) Alberta Golden Bears	Selected 8th overall in the 2018 CPL–U Sports Draft	December 13, 2018	
13	GK	(Canada) Dylon Powley	(Sweden) Gute	Free Transfer	January 17, 2019	
1	GK	(Canada) Connor James	(Canada) Alberta Golden Bears	Selected 7th overall in the 2018 CPL–U Sports Draft	January 17, 2019	
18	FW	(England) Tomi Ameobi	(United States) FC Cincinnati	Free Transfer	January 31, 2019	
6	MF	(Ghana) Edem Mortotsi	(Canada) Edmonton Green & Gold	Free Transfer	January 31, 2019	
12	DF	(Trinidad and Tobago) Kareem Moses	(Finland) FF Jaro	Free Transfer	January 31, 2019	
5	DF	(Spain) Ramón Soria	(Spain) Formentera	Free Transfer	January 31, 2019	
45	FW	(Belgium) Oumar Diouck	(Belgium) KVK Tienen	Free Transfer	January 31, 2019	
26	FW	(Canada) David Doe	Academy Graduate		February 15, 2019	
16	MF	(Canada) Prince Amanda	Academy Graduate		February 15, 2019	
17	MF	(Canada) Marcus Velado-Tsegaye	Academy Graduate		February 15, 2019	
14	MF	(Haiti) James Marcelin	(United States) Miami United	Free Transfer	February 22, 2019	
3	DF	(Cameroon) Jeannot Esua	(Cameroon) Rainbow Bamenda	Free Transfer	February 22, 2019	
8	DF	(Germany) Mélé Temguia	(Australia) Valentine Phoenix	Free Transfer	February 26, 2019	
10	MF	(Canada) Philippe Lincourt-Joseph	(Oman) Al-Rustaq	Free Transfer	February 26, 2019	
55	DF	(Canada) Amer Didic	(United States) San Antonio FC	Free Transfer	April 15, 2019	
19	FW	(Canada) Easton Ongaro	(Canada) Alberta Golden Bears	Free Transfer	May 1, 2019	
22	MF	(Cameroon) Tony Tchani	Unattached	Free Transfer	August 7, 2019	

==== Draft picks ====
FC Edmonton selected the following players in the 2018 CPL–U Sports Draft on November 12, 2018. Draft picks are not automatically signed to the team roster. Only those who are signed to a contract will be listed as transfers in.

Round	Selection	Pos.	Player	Nationality	University
1	7	GK	Connor James	Canada	Alberta Golden Bears
2	8	FW	Ajeej Sarkaria	Canada	Alberta Golden Bears
3	21	DF	Noah Cunningham	Canada	Alberta Golden Bears

=== Out ===
No.	Pos.	Player	Transferred to	Fee/notes	Date	Source

== Competitions ==
Match times are Mountain Daylight Time (UTC−6).

=== Preseason ===
March 30	Cavalry FC	2–0	FC Edmonton	Calgary, Alberta
	Pasquotti; Malonga (pen.)	Report	Yong-chan (yellow card) (yellow-red card)	Stadium: Southern Alberta Institute of Technology

April 11	Inter RD	0–2	FC Edmonton	Punta Cana, Dominican Republic
		Report	Lincourt-Joseph; Diouck (pen.)

April 14	FC Edmonton	0–1	HFX Wanderers FC	Punta Cana, Dominican Republic
		Report	Garcia

=== Canadian Premier League ===
==== Spring season ====
===== League table =====
Pos	Team	Pld	W	D	L	GF	GA	GD	Pts	Qualification
1	Cavalry	10	8	0	2	16	7	+9	24	2019 Canadian Premier League Finals
2	Forge	10	6	1	3	15	7	+8	19	2019 CONCACAF League preliminary round (Note: As winner of home and away matches between FC Edmonton, Forge FC, and Valour FC)
3	FC Edmonton	10	4	2	4	8	9	−1	14	
4	HFX Wanderers	10	3	2	5	8	11	−3	11	
5	Pacific	10	3	2	5	11	15	−4	11	
6	York9	10	2	5	3	9	11	−2	11	
7	Valour	10	3	0	7	8	15	−7	9	

Source: CanPL.ca
Rules for classification: 1) points; 2) total wins; 3) goal differential; 4) goals for; 5) away goal differential; 6) away goals for; 7) home goal differential; 8) home goals for; 9) coin toss or drawing of lots.

===== 2019 CONCACAF League qualification table =====
Pos	Team	Pld	W	D	L	GF	GA	GD	Pts	Qualification	FOR	FCE	VAL
1	Forge FC	4	3	0	1	6	2	+4	9	2019 CONCACAF League	—	2–0	2–1
2	FC Edmonton	4	2	0	2	3	4	−1	6		1–0	—	0–1
3	Valour FC	4	1	0	3	3	6	−3	3		0–2	1–2	—

Source: CanPL.ca
Rules for classification: 1) points; 2) total wins; 3) goal differential; 4) goals for; 5) away goal differential; 6) away goals for; 7) home goal differential; 8) home goals for; 9) coin toss or drawing of lots.

===== Results summary =====
Overall								Home						Away					
Pld	W	D	L	GF	GA	GD	Pts	W	D	L	GF	GA	GD	W	D	L	GF	GA	GD
10	4	2	4	8	9	−1	14	2	1	2	3	4	−1	2	1	2	5	5	0

Last updated: July 1, 2019.
Source: canpl.ca

===== Results by match =====
Match	1	2	3	4	5	6	7	8	9	10
Ground	A	H	A	A	H	H	A	A	H	H
Result	W	D	L	L	L	L	D	W	W	W
Position	1	4	5	5	6	7	7	5	3	3

Updated to match(es) played on July 1, 2019. Source: #Matches
A = Away; H = Home; W = Win; D = Draw; L = Loss

===== Matches =====
May 4 1 CONCACAF series	Valour FC	1–2	FC Edmonton	Winnipeg, Manitoba
4:00 pm	Gutiérrez (yellow card) 71'; Petrasso 86' (pen.)	Report	Temguia 45+1'; Diouck 76'	Stadium: Investors Group Field; Attendance: 9,699; Referee: Pierre-Luc Lauzière

May 12 2	FC Edmonton	0–0	Pacific FC	Edmonton, Alberta
1:30 pm	Lincourt-Joseph (red card) 28'; Esua (yellow card) 42'; Didic (yellow card) 57'	Report	Legault (yellow card) 38'	Stadium: Clarke Stadium; Attendance: 4,238; Referee: David Gantar

May 18 3 Wildrose Cup	Cavalry FC	1–0	FC Edmonton	Foothills County, Alberta
4:00 pm	Brown 45+1'; Adekugbe (yellow card) 66'	Report	Soria (yellow card) 9'	Stadium: Spruce Meadows; Referee: Alain Ruch

May 29 4 CONCACAF series	Forge FC	2–0	FC Edmonton	Hamilton, Ontario
5:00 pm	Borges 35' (pen.); Krutzen 70'	Report	Moses (yellow card) 54'; Diouck (yellow card) 80'; Temguia (yellow card) 90+3'	Stadium: Tim Hortons Field; Attendance: 6,019; Referee: Mathieu Souare

June 2 5 CONCACAF series	FC Edmonton	0–1	Valour FC	Edmonton, Alberta
10:30 am	Ameobi (yellow card) 16'	Report	Galvis (yellow card) 8'; Thomas (yellow card) 16'; Musse 80'	Stadium: Clarke Stadium; Attendance: 3,762; Referee: Yusri Rudolf
Note: Originally scheduled for June 1, but postponed due to the Alberta wildfire.

June 15 6 Wildrose Cup	FC Edmonton	0–3	Cavalry FC	Edmonton, Alberta
12:30 pm	Moses (yellow card) 33'; B. Zebie (yellow card) 54'	Report	Camargo (yellow card) 35' (goal) 66', 73'; Waterman (yellow card) 59'; Adekugbe (yellow card) 61'; Pasquotti 77'	Stadium: Clarke Stadium; Attendance: 3,256; Referee: Juan Marquez

June 19 7	York9 FC	0–0	FC Edmonton	Toronto, Ontario
5:00 pm	Di Chiara (yellow card) 78'	Report		Stadium: York Lions Stadium; Attendance: 2,500; Referee: Filip Dujic

June 23 8	Pacific FC	1–3	FC Edmonton	Langford, British Columbia
4:00 pm	Blasco 83'	Report	Ameobi 32'; Diouck 38'; Son (yellow card) 65'; B. Zebie 79'; Esua (yellow card) 89'	Stadium: Westhills Stadium; Attendance: 4,067; Referee: Alain Ruch

June 26 9 CONCACAF series	FC Edmonton	1–0	Forge FC	Edmonton, Alberta
7:00 pm	Diouck 16'	Report	Owundi (yellow card) 64'	Stadium: Clarke Stadium; Attendance: 2,321; Referee: Yusri Rudolf

July 1 10	FC Edmonton	2–0	HFX Wanderers FC	Edmonton, Alberta
1:30 pm	Velado-Tsegaye 36'; Diouck 84'	Report		Stadium: Clarke Stadium; Attendance: 3,012; Referee: Filip Dujic

==== Fall season ====
===== League table =====
Pos	Team	Pld	W	D	L	GF	GA	GD	Pts	Qualification
1	Cavalry	18	11	5	2	35	12	+23	38	2019 Canadian Premier League Finals
2	Forge	18	11	4	3	30	19	+11	37	
3	York9	18	7	2	9	30	26	+4	23	
4	Pacific	18	5	5	8	24	31	−7	20	
5	Valour	18	5	4	9	22	37	−15	19	
6	FC Edmonton	18	4	6	8	19	24	−5	18	
7	HFX Wanderers	18	3	8	7	13	24	−11	17	

Source: CanPL.ca
Rules for classification: 1) points; 2) total wins; 3) goal differential; 4) goals for; 5) away goal differential; 6) away goals for; 7) home goal differential; 8) home goals for; 9) coin toss or drawing of lots.

===== Results summary =====
Overall								Home						Away					
Pld	W	D	L	GF	GA	GD	Pts	W	D	L	GF	GA	GD	W	D	L	GF	GA	GD
18	4	6	8	19	24	−5	18	3	3	3	12	10	+2	1	3	5	7	14	−7

Last updated: October 19, 2019.
Source: canpl.ca

===== Results by match =====
Match	1	2	3	4	5	6	7	8	9	10	11	12	13	14	15	16	17	18
Ground	A	A	H	H	H	H	A	A	H	A	H	A	H	A	H	A	H	A
Result	W	L	D	D	W	W	D	L	D	D	L	L	L	D	L	L	W	L
Position	2	3	3	4	4	1	3	3	3	3	3	4	6	6	6	6		6

Updated to match(es) played on October 19, 2019. Source: #Matches
A = Away; H = Home; W = Win; D = Draw; L = Loss

===== Matches =====
July 6 1	Forge FC	1–2	FC Edmonton	Hamilton, Ontario
11:00 am	Kotsopoulos 57'; Owundi (yellow card) 61'	Report	Ameobi 38'; Henry 72' (o.g.); Marcelin (yellow card) 89'	Stadium: Tim Hortons Field; Attendance: 6,086; Referee: David Barrie

July 14 2	York9 FC	2–1	FC Edmonton	Toronto, Ontario
1:30 pm	Porter 13'; Gasparotto (yellow card) 36'; Telfer 80'	Report	Velado-Tsegaye (yellow card) 43'; Soria 67'; Ameobi (yellow card) 69'	Stadium: York Lions Stadium; Attendance: 2,219; Referee: Scott Bowman

July 17 3	FC Edmonton	0–0	Valour FC	Edmonton, Alberta
7:00 pm	Diouck (yellow card) 51'; Ongaro (yellow card) 81'	Report	Ohin (yellow card) 43'	Stadium: Clarke Stadium; Attendance: 2,890; Referee: Pierre-Luc Lauzière
Note: Game was delayed 50-minutes due to a thunderstorm.

July 27 4	FC Edmonton	1–1	Forge FC	Edmonton, Alberta
4:00 pm	Ongaro 89'	Report	Bekker 86'	Stadium: Clarke Stadium; Attendance: 2,021; Referee: Filip Dujic
Note: Kickoff was delayed 10-minutes due to a thunderstorm.

July 31 5	FC Edmonton	2–0	HFX Wanderers FC	Edmonton, Alberta
7:00 pm	Diouck (yellow card) 19'; Ongaro 21'; Ameobi 47' (pen.)	Report	Rampersad (yellow card) 34'; Hocine (yellow card) 74'; Bona (yellow card) 87'	Stadium: Clarke Stadium; Attendance: 2,873; Referee: Juan Marquez

August 10 6	FC Edmonton	3–1	Pacific FC	Edmonton, Alberta
4:00 pm	Diouck 32'; Ongaro 47', 66'	Report	Fisk 34'	Stadium: Clarke Stadium; Attendance: 3,745; Referee: Mathieu Souaré

August 16 7 Wildrose Cup	Cavalry FC	0–0	FC Edmonton	Foothills County, Alberta
7:00 pm	Oliver (yellow card) 34'	Report	Didic (yellow card) 76'; Edwini-Bonsu (yellow card) 80'	Stadium: ATCO Field; Attendance: 3,650; Referee: Juan Marquez

August 19 8	Valour FC	3–1	FC Edmonton	Winnipeg, Manitoba
6:00 pm	Petrasso 52' (pen.); Béland-Goyette 69'; Bustos 81' (yellow card) 82'; Janssens (yellow card) 86'; Ohin (yellow card) 90+2'	Report	Ongaro 30'; Soria (yellow card) 35'	Stadium: IG Field; Attendance: 6,379; Referee: Alain Ruch

August 25 9	FC Edmonton	2–2	York9 FC	Edmonton, Alberta
4:00 pm	Diouck 4'; Didic (yellow card) 50'; Ongaro 71'; Temguia (yellow card) 76'	Report	Murofushi 11'; Doner (yellow card) 66'; Telfer 85'	Stadium: Clarke Stadium; Attendance: 2,534; Referee: Marie-Soleil Beaudoin

September 2 10	HFX Wanderers FC	0–0	FC Edmonton	Halifax, Nova Scotia
11:00 am	Gutiérrez (yellow card) 11'; De Carolis (yellow card) 25'	Report	Diouck (yellow card) 13'	Stadium: Wanderers Grounds; Attendance: 6,200; Referee: Mathieu Souaré

September 11 11 Wildrose Cup	FC Edmonton	0–1	Cavalry FC	Edmonton, Alberta
7:00 pm	Marcelin (yellow card) 45+2'; Diouck (yellow card) 66'; Esua (red card) 74'	Report	Ledgerwood 27' (pen.); Pasquotti (yellow card) 43'; Brown (yellow card) 79'	Stadium: Clarke Stadium; Attendance: 2,790; Referee: David Gantar

September 14 12	Pacific FC	1–0	FC Edmonton	Langford, British Columbia
1:00 pm	Chung 28'	Report	A. Zebie (yellow card) 52'; Ameobi (yellow card) 79'	Stadium: Westhills Stadium; Attendance: 2,017; Referee: Alain Ruch

September 21 13	FC Edmonton	1–3	York9 FC	Edmonton, Alberta
1:30 pm	Soria (yellow card) 35'; Sarkaria (yellow card) 41'; Ongaro 65'	Report	Gasparotto 8'; Gattas 21'; Telfer 31'	Stadium: Clarke Stadium; Attendance: 2,690; Referee: Alain Ruch

September 28 14	HFX Wanderers FC	1–1	FC Edmonton	Halifax, Nova Scotia
11:00 am	Didic 6' (o.g.); John (yellow card) 18'	Report	Temguia (yellow card) 69'; Ameobi 80'	Stadium: Wanderers Grounds; Attendance: 6,213; Referee: Juan Marquez

October 2 15	FC Edmonton	0–1	Forge FC	Edmonton, Alberta
7:00 pm		Report	Cela 26'	Stadium: Clarke Stadium; Attendance: 2,042; Referee: David Barrie

October 5 16	Valour FC	3–1	FC Edmonton	Winnipeg, Manitoba
1:30 pm	Carreiro 12'; Paolucci 40' (yellow card) 88'; Bustos 72' (pen.); Peña (yellow card) 90+2'	Report	Ongaro 56'	Stadium: IG Field; Attendance: 4,776; Referee: Juan Marquez

October 16 17	FC Edmonton	3–1	Pacific FC	Edmonton, Alberta
7:00 pm	Amanda 20'; Mortotsi (yellow card) 22'; Ongaro 25'; Temguia 79'; B. Zebie (yellow card) 90+2'	Report	Baldisimo (yellow card) 28'; Fisk 59'	Stadium: Clarke Stadium; Attendance: 2,489; Referee: Pierre-Luc Lauzière

October 19 18 Wildrose Cup	Cavalry FC	3–1	FC Edmonton	Foothills County, Alberta
2:00 pm	Adekugbe (yellow card) 47'; Camargo 76'; Brown 80'; Escalante 86' (yellow card) 86'	Report	Ameobi (yellow card) 75'; Diouck (yellow card) 83'; Ongaro 90'	Stadium: ATCO Field; Attendance: 3,492; Referee: David Barrie

=== Canadian Championship ===
June 5 Second qualifying round	York9 FC	3–1	FC Edmonton	Toronto, Ontario
5:00 pm	Gasparotto 28'; Gattas 31'; Aparicio (yellow card) 43'; Adjei 51'	Report	Diouck 66'; Esua (yellow card) 67'; Edwini-Bonsu (yellow card) 74'; Marcelin (yellow card) 90+3'	Stadium: York Lions Stadium; Attendance: 728; Referee: Serge Topalian

June 12 Second qualifying round	FC Edmonton	1–0 (2–3 agg.)	York9 FC	Edmonton, Alberta
7:30 pm	Edwini-Bonsu (yellow card) 43'; Marcelin (yellow card) 85'; Temguia 90+4'	Report	Gogarty (yellow card) 57'	Stadium: Clarke Stadium; Attendance: 2,076; Referee: Fabrizio Stasolla

== Statistics ==
=== Squad and statistics ===
As of October 19, 2019

No.	Pos	Nat	Player	Total		CPL Spring season		CPL Fall season		Canadian Championship	
No.	Pos	Nat	Player	Apps	Goals	Apps	Goals	Apps	Goals	Apps	Goals
1	GK	(Canada) CAN	Connor James	22	0	10+0	0	12+0	0	0+0	0
3	DF	(Cameroon) CMR	Jeannot Esua	23	0	9+1	0	11+0	0	2+0	0
4	DF	(Canada) CAN	Allan Zebie	23	0	7+0	0	16+0	0	0+0	0
5	DF	(Spain) ESP	Ramón Soria	25	1	10+0	0	12+1	1	2+0	0
6	MF	(Ghana) GHA	Edem Mortotsi	18	0	0+2	0	9+7	0	0+0	0
7	MF	(South Korea) KOR	Son Yong-chan	16	0	7+1	0	4+2	0	2+0	0
8	DF	(Germany) GER	Mélé Temguia	29	3	10+0	1	17+0	1	2+0	1
9	FW	(Canada) CAN	Ajeej Sarkaria	10	0	2+0	0	6+2	0	0+0	0
10	MF	(Canada) CAN	Philippe Lincourt-Joseph	12	0	2+1	0	1+7	0	1+0	0
11	FW	(Canada) CAN	Randy Edwini-Bonsu	14	0	2+3	0	1+6	0	2+0	0
12	DF	(Trinidad and Tobago) TTO	Kareem Moses	17	0	6+1	0	5+3	0	2+0	0
13	GK	(Canada) CAN	Dylon Powley	8	0	0+0	0	6+0	0	2+0	0
14	MF	(Haiti) HAI	James Marcelin	23	0	9+1	0	9+2	0	1+1	0
16	MF	(Canada) CAN	Prince Amanda	2	1	0+0	0	2+0	1	0+0	0
17	MF	(Canada) CAN	Marcus Velado-Tsegaye	18	1	2+4	1	3+7	0	0+2	0
18	FW	(England) ENG	Tomi Ameobi	25	4	8+0	1	13+2	3	1+1	0
19	FW	(Canada) CAN	Easton Ongaro	22	10	0+5	0	11+5	10	0+1	0
20	MF	(Canada) CAN	Bruno Zebie	25	1	8+2	1	12+1	0	2+0	0
22	MF	(Cameroon) CMR	Tony Tchani	5	0	0+0	0	2+3	0	0+0	0
23	MF	(Canada) CAN	Ajay Khabra	24	0	4+2	0	17+1	0	0+0	0
26	FW	(Canada) CAN	David Doe	8	0	1+2	0	1+3	0	1+0	0
45	FW	(Belgium) BEL	Oumar Diouck	28	6	7+3	4	15+1	2	2+0	0
55	DF	(Canada) CAN	Amer Didic	20	0	6+0	0	13+0	0	0+1	0

=== Top scorers ===
Rank	Nat.	Player	Pos.	CPL Spring season	CPL Fall season	Canadian Championship	TOTAL
1	(Canada)	Easton Ongaro	FW	0	10	0	10
2	(Belgium)	Oumar Diouck	FW	4	2	1	7
3	(England)	Tomi Ameobi	FW	1	3	0	4
4	(Germany)	Mélé Temguia	DF	1	1	1	3
5	(Canada)	Prince Amanda	MF	0	1	0	1
5	(Spain)	Ramón Soria	DF	0	1	0	1
5	(Canada)	Marcus Velado-Tsegaye	MF	1	0	0	1
5	(Canada)	Bruno Zebie	MF	1	0	0	1
Own goals				0	1	0	1
Totals				8	19	2	29

Updated to match played October 19, 2019
Source: Canadian Premier League

=== Top assists ===
Rank	Nat.	Player	Pos.	CPL Spring season	CPL Fall season	Canadian Championship	TOTAL
1	(Canada)	Amer Didic	DF	1	2	0	3
1	(Spain)	Ramón Soria	DF	2	1	0	3
3	(Belgium)	Oumar Diouck	FW	0	2	0	2
3	(Cameroon)	Jeannot Esua	DF	1	1	0	2
3	(Ghana)	Edem Mortotsi	MF	0	2	0	2
3	(Canada)	Easton Ongaro	FW	1	1	0	2
7	(Canada)	Prince Amanda	MF	0	1	0	1
7	(England)	Tomi Ameobi	FW	0	0	1	1
7	(Canada)	Randy Edwini-Bonsu	FW	0	1	0	1
7	(Canada)	Philippe Lincourt-Joseph	MF	0	1	0	1
7	(Canada)	Ajeej Sarkaria	FW	0	1	0	1
7	(South Korea)	Son Yong-chan	MF	1	0	0	1
Totals				6	13	1	20

Updated to match played October 19, 2019
Source: Canadian Premier League

=== Clean sheets ===
Rank	Nat.	Player	CPL Spring season	CPL Fall season	Canadian Championship	TOTAL
1	(Canada)	Connor James	4	3	0	7
2	(Canada)	Dylon Powley	0	1	0	1
Totals			4	4	0	8

Updated to match played October 19, 2019
Source: Canadian Premier League

=== Disciplinary record ===
No.	Pos.	Nat.	Player	CPL Spring season		CPL Fall season		Canadian Championship		TOTAL	
No.	Pos.	Nat.	Player	Yellow card	Red card	Yellow card	Red card	Yellow card	Red card	Yellow card	Red card
3	DF	(Cameroon)	Jeannot Esua	2	0	0	1	1	0	3	1
4	DF	(Canada)	Allan Zebie	0	0	1	0	0	0	1	0
5	DF	(Spain)	Ramón Soria	1	0	2	0	0	0	3	0
6	MF	(Ghana)	Edem Mortotsi	0	0	1	0	0	0	1	0
7	MF	(South Korea)	Son Yong-chan	1	0	0	0	0	0	1	0
8	DF	(Germany)	Mélé Temguia	1	0	2	0	0	0	3	0
9	FW	(Canada)	Ajeej Sarkaria	0	0	1	0	0	0	1	0
10	MF	(Canada)	Philippe Lincourt-Joseph	0	1	0	0	0	0	0	1
11	FW	(Canada)	Randy Edwini-Bonsu	0	0	1	0	2	0	3	0
12	DF	(Trinidad and Tobago)	Kareem Moses	2	0	0	0	0	0	2	0
14	MF	(Haiti)	James Marcelin	0	0	2	0	2	0	4	0
17	MF	(Canada)	Marcus Velado-Tsegaye	0	0	1	0	0	0	1	0
18	FW	(England)	Tomi Ameobi	1	0	3	0	0	0	4	0
19	FW	(Canada)	Easton Ongaro	0	0	1	0	0	0	1	0
20	MF	(Spain)	Bruno Zebie	1	0	1	0	0	0	2	0
45	FW	(Belgium)	Oumar Diouck	1	0	5	0	0	0	6	0
55	DF	(Canada)	Amer Didic	1	0	2	0	0	0	3	0
Totals				11	1	22	1	5	0	38	2

Updated to match played October 19, 2019
Source: Canadian Premier League
