= 2020 FC Edmonton season =

FC Edmonton
2020 season
- General manager: Jeff Paulus
- Head coach: Jeff Paulus
- Stadium: Clarke Stadium
- Canadian Premier League: 8th
- Canadian Championship: Did not qualify
- Top goalscorer: Easton Ongaro (3 goals)
| Home colours | Away colours |

The 2020 FC Edmonton season was the club's ninth competitive season as well as their second in the Canadian Premier League. In their previous season, FC Edmonton finished 3rd in the Spring season and 6th in the Fall season, failing to qualify for the finals.

FC Edmonton celebrated their tenth anniversary by introducing home kits featuring the Roman numeral 'X' on the front and back. The club finished the COVID-19 shortened season in last place, failing to record a win in seven matches. Following the 2020 campaign, Jeff Paulus resigned as head coach and general manager but remained with the club in a new role.

== Current squad ==
As of August 12, 2020.

| No. | Name | Nationality | Position(s) | Date of birth (age) | Previous club |
Goalkeepers
| 1 | Connor James | (Canada) | GK | July 17, 1996 (aged 24) | (Canada) Alberta Golden Bears |
| 13 | Dylon Powley | (Canada) | GK | September 5, 1996 (aged 24) | (Sweden) Gute |
Defenders
| 3 | Jeannot Esua | (Cameroon) | RB / RW | August 6, 1996 (aged 24) | (Cameroon) Rainbow Bamenda |
| 4 | Allan Zebie | (Canada) | LB | May 29, 1993 (aged 27) | (Canada) FC Edmonton (NASL) |
| 5 | Ramón Soria | (Spain) | CB / DM | March 7, 1989 (aged 31) | (Spain) Formentera |
| 8 | Mélé Temguia | (Germany) | CB | August 1, 1995 (aged 25) | (Australia) Valentine Phoenix |
| 12 | Kareem Moses | (Trinidad and Tobago) | RB | February 11, 1990 (aged 30) | (Finland) FF Jaro |
| 23 | Duran Lee | (Canada) | CB | May 9, 1995 (aged 25) | (Canada) HFX Wanderers |
| 33 | Sam Gardner | (Canada) | CB | April 4, 1997 (aged 23) | (United States) Grand Canyon Antelopes |
| 55 | Amer Didic | (Canada) | CB | December 28, 1994 (aged 26) | (United States) San Antonio FC |
| 57 | Terique Mohammed | (Canada) | FB | January 27, 2000 (aged 20) | (Canada) Toronto FC II |
Midfielders
| 6 | Edem Mortotsi | (Ghana) | CM | May 16, 1993 (aged 27) | (Canada) FC Edmonton (NASL) |
| 7 | Son Yong-chan | (South Korea) | CM | April 15, 1991 (aged 29) | (India) Ozone |
| 10 | Hanson Boakai | (Canada) | LM / RM / LW / RW / ST | October 28, 1996 (aged 24) | (Finland) FC Inter Turku |
| 11 | Keven Alemán | (Canada) | AM | March 25, 1994 (aged 26) | (United States) Sacramento Republic |
| 14 | Chance Carter | (Canada) | CM | September 15, 2001 (aged 19) | (Canada) Vancouver Whitecaps Academy |
| 16 | Prince Amanda | (Canada) | LW / RW | March 23, 2001 (aged 19) | Academy |
| 17 | Marcus Velado-Tsegaye | (Canada) | LW / RW / ST | July 1, 2001 (aged 19) | Academy |
| 20 | Antony Caceres | (Canada) | CM | January 31, 2000 (aged 20) | (Canada) Vancouver Whitecaps Academy |
| 21 | Erik Zetterberg | (Sweden) | CM | February 16, 1997 (aged 23) | (Sweden) Varbergs BoIS |
| | Raúl Tito (Note: Player is signed, but has not been added to the 2020 roster because of difficulties getting into Canada due to the COVID-19 pandemic) | (Peru) | LW / RW | September 5, 1997 (aged 23) | (Peru) Cienciano |
Forwards
| 18 | Tomi Ameobi | (England) | CF | August 16, 1988 (aged 32) | (United States) FC Cincinnati |
| 19 | Easton Ongaro | (Canada) | ST | June 5, 1998 (aged 22) | (Canada) Alberta Golden Bears |
| 26 | David Doe | (Canada) | ST | November 30, 2000 (aged 20) | (Canada) FC Edmonton (NASL) |

== Transfers ==
=== In ===
==== Transferred in ====
| No. | Pos. | Player | Transferred from | Fee/notes | Date | Source |
|---|---|---|---|---|---|---|
| 10 | MF | (Canada) Hanson Boakai | (Finland) FC Inter Turku | Free transfer | December 3, 2019 | |
| 23 | DF | (Canada) Duran Lee | (Canada) HFX Wanderers | Free transfer | January 29, 2020 | |
| 21 | MF | (Sweden) Erik Zetterberg | (Sweden) Varbergs BoIS | Free transfer | February 5, 2020 | |
| 20 | MF | (Canada) Antony Caceres | (Canada) Vancouver Whitecaps Academy | Free transfer | February 12, 2020 | |
| 14 | MF | (Canada) Chance Carter | (Canada) Vancouver Whitecaps Academy | Free transfer | February 12, 2020 | |
| | MF | (Peru) Raúl Tito | (Peru) Cienciano | Free transfer | February 19, 2020 | |
| 11 | MF | (Canada) Keven Alemán | (United States) Sacramento Republic | Free transfer | March 24, 2020 | |
| 33 | DF | (Canada) Sam Gardner | (United States) Grand Canyon Antelopes | Free transfer | August 3, 2020 | |

==== Draft picks ====
FC Edmonton selected the following players in the 2019 CPL–U Sports Draft on November 11, 2019. Draft picks are not automatically signed to the team roster. Only those who are signed to a contract will be listed as transfers in.

| Round | Selection | Pos. | Player | Nationality | University |
|---|---|---|---|---|---|
| 1 | 4 | MF | David Chung | Canada | Alberta Golden Bears |
| 2 | 11 | MF | Jacob Bosch | Canada | Alberta Golden Bears |

==== Loans in ====
| No. | Pos. | Player | Loaned from | Fee/notes | Date | Source |
|---|---|---|---|---|---|---|
| 57 | DF | (Canada) Terique Mohammed | (Canada) Toronto FC II | Season-long loan | August 3, 2020 | |

=== Out ===
==== Transferred out ====
| No. | Pos. | Player | Transferred to | Fee/notes | Date | Source |
|---|---|---|---|---|---|---|
| 22 | MF | (Cameroon) Tony Tchani | | Contract expired | November 4, 2019 | |
| 45 | FW | (Belgium) Oumar Diouck | (Iceland) Fjallabyggð | Contract expired | November 4, 2019 | |
| 14 | MF | (Haiti) James Marcelin | | Contract expired | November 4, 2019 | |
| 9 | FW | (Canada) Ajeej Sarkaria | | Contract expired | November 4, 2019 | |
| 20 | MF | (Canada) Bruno Zebie | (Canada) Cavalry FC | Contract expired | November 4, 2019 | |
| 11 | FW | (Canada) Randy Edwini-Bonsu | | Contract expired | November 4, 2019 | |
| 10 | MF | (Canada) Philippe Lincourt-Joseph | | Contract expired | November 4, 2019 | |
| 23 | MF | (Canada) Ajay Khabra | (Canada) Atlético Ottawa | Contract expired | March 5, 2020 | |

==== Loans out ====
| No. | Pos. | Player | Loaned to | Fee/notes | Date | Source |
|---|---|---|---|---|---|---|
| 19 | FW | (Canada) Easton Ongaro | (Denmark) Vendsyssel FF | Loaned until December 31, 2020; option to buy | October 4, 2020 | |
| | MF | (Peru) Raúl Tito | (Peru) Santos de Nasca | Loaned until March 31, 2021 | October 10, 2020 | |

== Pre-season ==
=== Matches ===
All three matches were cancelled due to the COVID-19 pandemic in Canada.

| March 17 | Langley United | v | FC Edmonton | Langley, British Columbia |
| 7:00 pm PT | | | | Stadium: Willoughby Community Park |

| March 28 | SK Soccer Selects | v | FC Edmonton | Saskatoon, Saskatchewan |
| 7:00 pm CT | | | | Stadium: SaskTel Soccer Centre |

| March 29 | SK Soccer Selects | v | FC Edmonton | Saskatoon, Saskatchewan |
| 6:00 pm CT | | | | Stadium: SaskTel Soccer Centre |

== Canadian Premier League ==
Match times are Mountain Daylight Time (UTC−6).

=== First stage ===
==== Table ====
| Pos | Team | Pld | W | D | L | GF | GA | GD | Pts | Qualification |
|---|---|---|---|---|---|---|---|---|---|---|
| 1 | Cavalry | 7 | 4 | 1 | 2 | 10 | 7 | +3 | 13 | Advance to group stage |
| 2 | HFX Wanderers | 7 | 3 | 3 | 1 | 12 | 7 | +5 | 12 (Note: Head-to-head points: HFX Wanderers 1, Forge 1. Goal differential: HFX Wanderers +5, Forge +4) | Advance to group stage |
| 3 | Forge | 7 | 3 | 3 | 1 | 13 | 9 | +4 | 12 | Advance to group stage |
| 4 | Pacific | 7 | 3 | 2 | 2 | 10 | 8 | +2 | 11 | Advance to group stage |
| 5 | York9 | 7 | 2 | 4 | 1 | 8 | 7 | +1 | 10 | |
| 6 | Valour | 7 | 2 | 2 | 3 | 8 | 9 | −1 | 8 (Note: Head-to-head points: Valour 3, Atlético Ottawa 0.) | |
| 7 | Atlético Ottawa | 7 | 2 | 2 | 3 | 7 | 12 | −5 | 8 | |
| 8 | FC Edmonton | 7 | 0 | 1 | 6 | 5 | 14 | −9 | 1 | |

Source: CanPL.ca
Rules for classification: 1) points; 2) head-to-head points; 3) goal differential; 4) goals for; 5) total wins; 6) U-21 minutes; 7) coin toss or drawing of lots.

==== Results by match ====
| Match | 1 | 2 | 3 | 4 | 5 | 6 | 7 |
|---|---|---|---|---|---|---|---|
| Result | L | L | D | L | L | L | L |
| Position | 7 | 8 | 8 | 8 | 8 | 8 | 8 |

Updated to match(es) played on September 6, 2020. Source: #Matches
W = Win; D = Draw; L = Loss

==== Matches ====
| August 16 1 | Forge FC | 2–0 | FC Edmonton | Charlottetown, Prince Edward Island |
| 1:00pm | Awuah 11'; Samuel (yellow card) 40'; Moses 90+2' (o.g.) | Report | | Stadium: Alumni Field; Referee: Carly Shaw-MacLaren |

| August 20 2 | FC Edmonton | 0–2 | Cavalry FC | Charlottetown, Prince Edward Island |
| 6:00pm | Ameobi (yellow card) 31'; Mohammed (red card) 49' | Report | Brown 44', 90+5' (pen.) | Stadium: Alumni Field; Referee: Yusri Rudolf |

| August 23 3 | Atlético Ottawa | 2–2 | FC Edmonton | Charlottetown, Prince Edward Island |
| 11:00am | Acuña 1', 15'; Coupland (yellow card) 41'; Fisk (yellow card) 43'; Kourouma (yellow card) 48' | Report | Alemán (yellow card) 20' (goal) 88'; Gardner (yellow card) 68'; Ongaro 90+1' | Stadium: Alumni Field; Referee: Myriam Marcotte |

| August 26 4 | FC Edmonton | 1–3 | HFX Wanderers FC | Charlottetown, Prince Edward Island |
| 6:00pm | Esua (yellow card) 37'; Velado-Tsegaye 87' | Report | Garcia 35'; Morelli 45', 76'; Geffrard (yellow card) 64' | Stadium: Alumni Field; Referee: Filip Dujic |

| August 29 5 | Valour FC | 2–1 | FC Edmonton | Charlottetown, Prince Edward Island |
| 10:00am | Fordyce 61'; Ricci (yellow card) 68'; Cebara (yellow card) 81'; Carreiro (yellow card) 83'; Kacher 88' | Report | Lee (yellow card) 36'; Zetterberg (yellow card) 65'; Ongaro 73'; Ameobi (yellow card) 81' | Stadium: Alumni Field; Referee: Pierre-Luc Lauzière |

| September 1 6 | FC Edmonton | 0–1 | York9 FC | Charlottetown, Prince Edward Island |
| 6:00pm | Zetterberg (yellow card) 43' | Report | Aparicio 44'; Mannella (yellow card) 74' | Stadium: Alumni Field; Referee: Myriam Marcotte |

| September 6 7 | Pacific FC | 2-1 | FC Edmonton | Charlottetown, Prince Edward Island |
| 1:00pm | Heard 64'; Bustos 85' | Report | Soria (yellow card) 54'; Ongaro 59'; Mohammed (yellow card) 92' | Stadium: Alumni Field; Referee: Juan Marquez |

== Statistics ==
=== Squad and statistics ===
As of September 6, 2020

| No. | Pos | Nat | Player | Total | | Canadian Premier League | |
| No. | Pos | Nat | Player | Apps | Goals | Apps | Goals |
|---|---|---|---|---|---|---|---|
| 1 | GK | (Canada) CAN | Connor James | 6 | 0 | 6+0 | 0 |
| 3 | DF | (Cameroon) CMR | Jeannot Esua | 7 | 0 | 7+0 | 0 |
| 4 | DF | (Canada) CAN | Allan Zebie | 5 | 0 | 5+0 | 0 |
| 5 | DF | (Spain) ESP | Ramón Soria | 7 | 0 | 7+0 | 0 |
| 6 | MF | (Ghana) GHA | Edem Mortotsi | 0 | 0 | 0+0 | 0 |
| 7 | MF | (South Korea) KOR | Son Yong-chan | 4 | 0 | 4+0 | 0 |
| 8 | DF | (Germany) GER | Mélé Temguia | 5 | 0 | 5+0 | 0 |
| 9 | FW | (Canada) CAN | Easton Ongaro | 7 | 3 | 5+2 | 3 |
| 10 | MF | (Canada) CAN | Hanson Boakai | 6 | 0 | 4+2 | 0 |
| 11 | MF | (Canada) CAN | Keven Alemán | 7 | 1 | 6+1 | 1 |
| 12 | DF | (Trinidad and Tobago) TRI | Kareem Moses | 4 | 0 | 2+2 | 0 |
| 13 | GK | (Canada) CAN | Dylon Powley | 1 | 0 | 1+0 | 0 |
| 14 | MF | (Canada) CAN | Chance Carter | 6 | 0 | 1+5 | 0 |
| 16 | FW | (Canada) CAN | Prince Amanda | 4 | 0 | 2+2 | 0 |
| 17 | FW | (Canada) CAN | Marcus Velado-Tsegaye | 4 | 1 | 2+2 | 1 |
| 18 | FW | (England) ENG | Tomi Ameobi | 7 | 0 | 3+4 | 0 |
| 20 | MF | (Canada) CAN | Antony Caceres | 7 | 0 | 2+5 | 0 |
| 21 | MF | (Sweden) SWE | Erik Zetterberg | 7 | 0 | 6+1 | 0 |
| 23 | DF | (Canada) CAN | Duran Lee | 2 | 0 | 2+0 | 0 |
| 26 | FW | (Canada) CAN | David Doe | 2 | 0 | 0+2 | 0 |
| 33 | DF | (Canada) CAN | Sam Gardner | 2 | 0 | 0+2 | 0 |
| 55 | DF | (Canada) CAN | Amer Đidić | 3 | 0 | 3+0 | 0 |
| 57 | DF | (Canada) CAN | Terique Mohammed | 5 | 0 | 3+2 | 0 |

=== Top scorers ===
| Rank | Nat. | Player | Pos. | Canadian Premier League | TOTAL |
|---|---|---|---|---|---|
| 1 | (Canada) | Easton Ongaro | FW | 3 | 3 |
| 2 | (Canada) | Keven Alemán | MF | 1 | 1 |
| 2 | (Canada) | Marcus Velado-Tsegaye | FW | 1 | 1 |
| Totals | | | | 5 | 5 |

Updated to match played September 6, 2020
Source: Canadian Premier League

=== Top assists ===
| Rank | Nat. | Player | Pos. | Canadian Premier League | TOTAL |
|---|---|---|---|---|---|
| 1 | (Canada) | Antony Caceres | MF | 1 | 1 |
| 1 | (Canada) | Terique Mohammed | DF | 1 | 1 |
| Totals | | | | 2 | 2 |

Updated to match played September 6, 2020
Source: Canadian Premier League

=== Clean sheets ===
| Rank | Nat. | Player | Canadian Premier League | TOTAL |
|---|---|---|---|---|
| Totals | | | 0 | 0 |

Updated to match played September 6, 2020
Source: Canadian Premier League

=== Disciplinary record ===
| No. | Pos. | Nat. | Player | Canadian Premier League | | TOTAL | |
| No. | Pos. | Nat. | Player | Booked | Sent off (straight red) | Booked | Sent off (straight red) |
|---|---|---|---|---|---|---|---|
| 3 | DF | (Cameroon) | Jeannot Esua | 1 | 0 | 1 | 0 |
| 5 | DF | (Spain) | Ramon Soria | 1 | 0 | 1 | 0 |
| 11 | MF | (Canada) | Keven Alemán | 1 | 0 | 1 | 0 |
| 18 | FW | (England) | Tomi Ameobi | 2 | 0 | 2 | 0 |
| 33 | DF | (Canada) | Sam Gardner | 1 | 0 | 1 | 0 |
| 57 | DF | (Canada) | Terique Mohammed | 1 | 1 | 1 | 1 |
| Totals | | | | 7 | 1 | 7 | 1 |

Updated to match played September 6, 2020
Source: Canadian Premier League
