= Zebie =

Zebie is a surname. Notable people with the surname include:

- Allan Zebie (born 1993), French footballer
- Bruno Zebie (born 1995), French footballer
