= Oumar Diouck =

Belgian footballer (born 1994)

Personal information
- Date of birth: 9 November 1994 (age 32)
- Place of birth: Pikine, Senegal
- Height: 1.78 m (5 ft 10 in)
- Position: Forward

Team information
- Current team: Njarðvík
- Number: 9

Youth career
- Lierse
- Beerschot

Senior career*
| Years | Team | Apps | (Gls) |
| 2010–2011 | Beerschot | 0 | (0) |
| 2011–2014 | Antwerp | 49 | (4) |
| 2014–2015 | Helmond Sport | 30 | (9) |
| 2015–2016 | Lommel United | 11 | (1) |
| 2017–2018 | Tienen | 40 | (5) |
| 2019 | FC Edmonton | 26 | (6) |
| 2020–2021 | KF | 39 | (23) |
| 2022– | Njarðvík | 103 | (64) |

International career
| 2009 | Belgium U15 | 2 | (1) |
| 2009–2010 | Belgium U16 | 9 | (3) |
| 2010–2011 | Belgium U17 | 12 | (3) |
- * Club domestic league appearances and goals as of 14 October 2026

Oumar Diouck (born 9 November 1994) is a Belgian professional footballer who plays as a forward for Icelandic club Njarðvík.

== Club career ==
=== Beerschot ===
Diouck began his professional career with Belgian Pro League side Beerschot, but never made a competitive appearance for the club.

=== Antwerp ===
In 2011, Diouck signed with Belgian Second Division side Royal Antwerp. On 10 September 2011, he made his professional debut for Antwerp as a substitute in a league match against Sint-Niklaas. On 13 October 2012, he scored his first professional goal in a 3–2 win over Tubize.

=== Helmond Sport ===
In 2014, Diouck signed with Dutch Eerste Divisie side Helmond Sport. He went on to score 10 goals in 31 appearances in all competitions in the 2014–15 season.

=== Lommel United ===
In June 2015, Diouck signed with Belgian Second Division side Lommel United.

=== Tienen ===
In January 2017, Diouck trialled with Dutch Eerste Divisie club Achilles '29.

He later signed with Belgian Second Amateur Division side K.V.K. Tienen-Hageland for the 2017–18 season.

=== FC Edmonton ===
On 31 January 2019, Diouck signed with Canadian Premier League club FC Edmonton. Diouck scored 6 goals in for Edmonton in the 2019 Canadian Premier League season, as well as one in the Canadian Championship, good for the second most goals on the team, after Easton Ongaro. Edmonton finished the spring season in third place, but dropped to sixth in the fall season. After the 2019 season ended, Diouck announced on Twitter that he would not return to Edmonton for the 2020 season.

=== KF ===
On 24 June 2020, Diouck signed with Icelandic 2. deild karla side Knattspyrnufélag Fjallabyggðar. He made his debut on 27 June as a substitute in a 0–1 loss to Víðir.

== International career ==
Diouck is eligible to represent Belgium and Senegal internationally. He has represented Belgium at the U-15, U-16 and U-17 level.

== Career statistics ==
As of 18 January 2025

Club statistics
| Club | Season | League | | | National Cup (Note: Includes appearances in the Belgian Cup, KNVB Cup, Canadian Championship and Icelandic Cup.) | | League Cup (Note: Includes appearances in the Icelandic League Cup.) | | Continental | | Other | | Total | |
| Club | Season | Division | Apps | Goals | Apps | Goals | Apps | Goals | Apps | Goals | Apps | Goals | Apps | Goals |
|---|---|---|---|---|---|---|---|---|---|---|---|---|---|---|
| Antwerp | 2011–12 | Belgian Second Division | 26 | 0 | 1 | 0 | — | | — | | 0 | 0 | 27 | 0 |
| Antwerp | 2012–13 | Belgian Second Division | 23 | 4 | 0 | 0 | — | | — | | 0 | 0 | 23 | 4 |
| Antwerp | 2013–14 | Belgian Second Division | 0 | 0 | 0 | 0 | — | | — | | 0 | 0 | 0 | 0 |
| Antwerp | Total | | 49 | 4 | 1 | 0 | 0 | 0 | 0 | 0 | 0 | 0 | 50 | 4 |
| Helmond Sport | 2014–15 | Eerste Divisie | 30 | 9 | 1 | 1 | — | | — | | 0 | 0 | 31 | 10 |
| Lommel United | 2015–16 | Belgian Second Division | 11 | 1 | 2 | 0 | — | | — | | 0 | 0 | 13 | 1 |
| Tienen | 2016–17 | Belgian Second Amateur Division | 28 | 2 | 2 | 0 | — | | — | | 0 | 0 | 30 | 2 |
| Tienen | 2017–18 | Belgian Second Amateur Division | 12 | 3 | 0 | 0 | — | | — | | 0 | 0 | 12 | 3 |
| Tienen | Total | | 40 | 5 | 2 | 0 | 0 | 0 | 0 | 0 | 0 | 0 | 42 | 5 |
| FC Edmonton | 2019 | Canadian Premier League | 26 | 6 | 2 | 1 | — | | — | | 0 | 0 | 28 | 7 |
| KF | 2020 | 2. deild karla | 19 | 12 | 0 | 0 | — | | — | | 0 | 0 | 19 | 12 |
| KF | 2021 | 2. deild karla | 20 | 11 | 2 | 1 | 4 | 6 | — | | 0 | 0 | 26 | 18 |
| KF | Total | | 39 | 23 | 2 | 1 | 4 | 6 | 0 | 0 | 0 | 0 | 45 | 30 |
| Njarðvík | 2022 | 2. deild karla | 22 | 16 | 4 | 1 | 7 | 6 | — | | 0 | 0 | 33 | 23 |
| Njarðvík | 2023 | 1. deild karla | 21 | 10 | 3 | 1 | 5 | 5 | — | | 0 | 0 | 29 | 16 |
| Njarðvík | 2024 | 1. deild karla | 21 | 9 | 1 | 0 | 4 | 2 | — | | 0 | 0 | 26 | 11 |
| Njarðvík | Total | | 64 | 35 | 8 | 2 | 16 | 13 | 0 | 0 | 0 | 0 | 88 | 50 |
| Career total | | | 259 | 83 | 18 | 5 | 20 | 19 | 0 | 0 | 0 | 0 | 297 | 108 |
