= Prince Amanda =

Tanzanian footballer (born 2001)

Personal information
- Full name: Prince David Amanda
- Date of birth: 23 March 2001 (age 25)
- Place of birth: Kigoma, Tanzania
- Height: 1.85 m (6 ft 1 in)
- Position: Forward

Youth career
- Sherwood Park
- 2013–2014: Edmonton Xtreme
- 2015–2019: FC Edmonton

Senior career*
| Years | Team | Apps | (Gls) |
| 2019–2021 | FC Edmonton | 9 | (1) |
| 2023 | Blue Devils FC | 1 | (0) |
| 2023 | Alliance United FC | 13 | (4) |
| 2024 | St. Albert Impact | 10 | (5) |
| 2025 | Edmonton BTB SC | 13 | (0) |
| 2026– | St. Albert Impact | 4 | (0) |
- * Club domestic league appearances and goals as of September 9, 2026

Prince David Amanda (born 23 March 2001) is a Tanzanian professional footballer who plays for St. Albert Impact in the Alberta Premier League.

== Early life ==
Amanda was born in Tanzania, where his family was living in a refugee camp after fleeing the Democratic Republic of Congo due to the civil war. He and his family immigrated to Canada when he was eight, where he grew up in Edmonton.

Amanda began playing organized football with Sherwood Park SA. At age twelve, Amanda switched to Edmonton Xtreme FC. In 2015, Amanda joined the academy program of FC Edmonton.

== College Career ==
In 2023, Amanda committed to playing U Sports soccer at the University of Alberta. On October 24, 2026, he scored the opening goal in a 2–1 victory over the Saskatchewan Huskies, helping Alberta secure a berth in the Canada West playoffs.

== Club career ==
On 15 February 2019, Amanda signed his first professional contract with Edmonton ahead of the club's first season in the Canadian Premier League. On 16 October 2019, Amanda made his debut as a starter in a 3–1 win over Pacific FC, in which he scored the opening goal and assisted on another. After the 2020 season, his contract option for 2021 was not picked up making him a free agent. After having discussions to join another CPL club in 2021, on October 1, 2021, he ultimately re-joined FC Edmonton for the remainder of the 2021 season, with contract options for 2022 and 2023. On February 9, 2022, the club announced that Amanda and all but two other players would not be returning for the 2022 season.

In 2023, he played a match with Blue Devils FC in League1 Ontario, before switching to join Alliance United FC.

In 2024, he signed with the St. Albert Impact in League1 Alberta.

== International career ==
In 2014, Amanda participated in a Canada national U-14 team identification camp.

== Personal ==
His older brother Gloire Amanda is also a professional soccer player.

== Career statistics ==
As of match played September 9, 2026

| Club | Season | League | | | Playoffs | | Domestic Cup | | Continental | | Total | |
| Club | Season | Division | Apps | Goals | Apps | Goals | Apps | Goals | Apps | Goals | Apps | Goals |
|---|---|---|---|---|---|---|---|---|---|---|---|---|
| FC Edmonton | 2019 | Canadian Premier League | 2 | 1 | – | | 0 | 0 | – | | 2 | 1 |
| FC Edmonton | 2020 | Canadian Premier League | 4 | 0 | – | | – | | – | | 4 | 0 |
| FC Edmonton | 2021 | Canadian Premier League | 3 | 0 | – | | 0 | 0 | – | | 3 | 0 |
| FC Edmonton | Total | | 9 | 1 | 0 | 0 | 0 | 0 | 0 | 0 | 9 | 1 |
| Blue Devils FC | 2023 | League1 Ontario | 1 | 0 | 0 | 0 | – | | – | | 1 | 0 |
| Alliance United FC | 2023 | League1 Ontario | 13 | 4 | – | | – | | – | | 13 | 4 |
| St. Albert Impact | 2024 | League1 Alberta | 10 | 5 | – | | – | | – | | 10 | 5 |
| Edmonton BTB SC | 2025 | League1 Alberta | 13 | 0 | – | | – | | – | | 13 | 0 |
| St. Albert Impact | 2026 | Alberta Premier League | 4 | 0 | – | | – | | – | | 4 | 0 |
| Career total | | | 50 | 10 | 0 | 0 | 0 | 0 | 0 | 0 | 50 | 10 |
