= Da Matta =

Da Matta may refer to:

== Place ==
- Circuito Toninho da Matta, street circuit

== People ==
=== Surname ===
- Adriano da Matta (born 1988), Brazilian footballer
- Cristiano da Matta (born 1973), Brazilian former professional racing driver
- Ney da Matta (1967–2019), Brazilian football manager
