= Son Yong-chan =

South Korean footballer (born 1991)

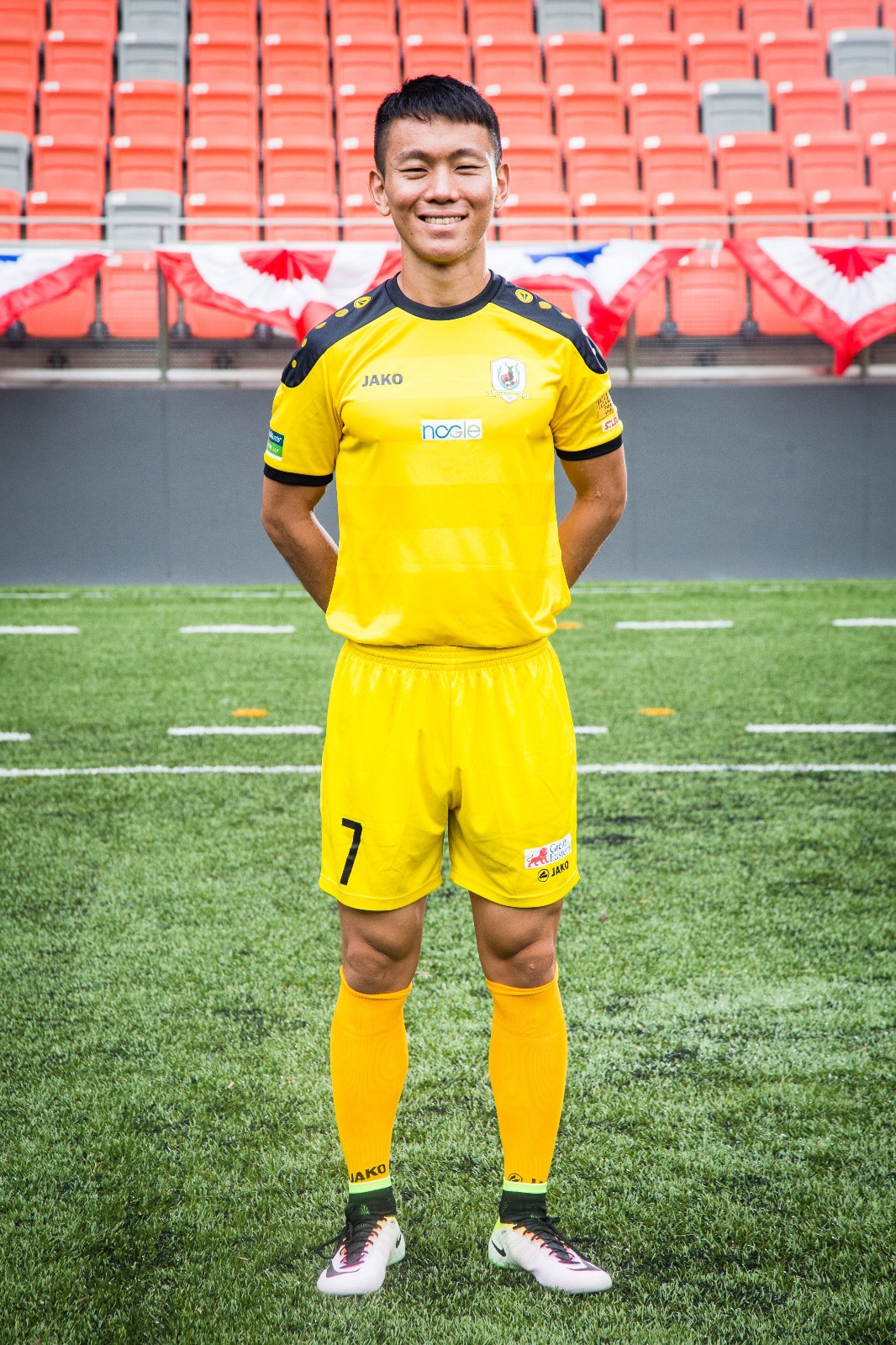
- Son with Tampines Rovers in 2017

Personal information
- Date of birth: 15 April 1991 (age 35)
- Place of birth: Jinju, South Korea
- Height: 1.78 m (5 ft 10 in)
- Position: Midfielder

Senior career*
Years	Team	Apps	(Gls)
2014–2016	Ceres	60	(0)
2017	Tampines Rovers	21	(1)
2018	Ozone	6	(2)
2019–2020	FC Edmonton	18	(0)
- * Club domestic league appearances and goals as of September 6, 2020

Son Yong-chan (born 15 April 1991) is a South Korean footballer who plays as a midfielder.

== Club career ==
=== Ceres ===
He played in the Philippines with Ceres FC from 2014 to 2016.

=== Tampines Rovers ===
Son moved to Singapore to play for Tampines Rovers in 2017. His first official match with the Rovers a 2017 AFC Cup game against Felda United on 21 February 2017. During this match, he also scored his first goal for the club.

=== Ozone ===
In early 2018 Son joined second-tier Indian side Ozone FC.

=== FC Edmonton ===
Son joined Canadian Premier League club FC Edmonton on 13 December 2018.

== Personal life ==
Son was born in Jinju, South Gyeongsang, South Korea.

Son has been tagged by the media as the "Smiling Assassin" in Singapore, as he has always flashed his smile whenever the customary pre-match photo is taken.

In the Philippines, Son has amassed respect and support from fans. During his first match against his former team, Ceres, Son played for the Singapore side under Tampines Rovers and returned to his former home stadium in Panaad Park and Stadium. It was this time that he again caught the eye of the media through his philanthropic deeds. He raised money to help fund a child's surgery. In his free time, he is immersing and volunteering in different philanthropic activities.

== Career statistics ==
As of 19 October 2019

Club statistics
Club	Season	League			National Cup (Note: Includes the PFF National Club Championship, Singapore Cup and Canadian Championship.)		League Cup		Continental (Note: Includes the AFC President's Cup, AFC Champions League and AFC Cup.)		Other (Note: Includes the Singapore Cup and I-League 2nd Division Playoffs.)		Total	
Club	Season	Division	Apps	Goals	Apps	Goals	Apps	Goals	Apps	Goals	Apps	Goals	Apps	Goals
Ceres	2014	Philippines Football League	27	0	0	0	—		3	0	0	0	30	0
Ceres	2015	Philippines Football League	17	0	7	0	—		1	0	0	0	25	0
Ceres	2016	Philippines Football League	16	0	0	0	—		7	0	5	0	28	0
Ceres	Total		60	0	7	0	0	0	11	0	5	0	83	0
Tampines Rovers	2017	Singapore Premier League	21	1	2	0	0	0	7	1	0	0	30	2
Tampines Rovers	Total		21	1	2	0	0	0	7	1	0	0	30	2
Ozone	2017–18	India 2nd Division	6	2	0	0	—		—		2	0	8	2
Ozone	Total		6	2	0	0	0	0	0	0	2	0	8	2
FC Edmonton	2019	Canadian Premier League	14	0	2	0	—		—		0	0	16	0
FC Edmonton	2020	Canadian Premier League	0	0	0	0	—		—		0	0	0	0
FC Edmonton	Total		14	0	2	0	0	0	0	0	0	0	16	0
Career total			101	3	11	0	0	0	18	1	7	0	137	4
