= Cavalry FC–FC Edmonton rivalry =

Soccer rivalry in Alberta, Canada

Cavalry FC v FC Edmonton
- Location: Alberta (Calgary and Edmonton)
- Teams: Cavalry FC; FC Edmonton
- First meeting: Cavalry 1–0 Edmonton; Canadian Premier League (May 18, 2019)
- Latest meeting: Cavalry 1–0 Edmonton; Canadian Premier League (September 17, 2022)
- Stadiums: Clarke Stadium, Edmonton; ATCO Field, Foothills County
- Trophy: Wildrose Cup

Statistics
- Total meetings: 17
- Most wins: Cavalry (14)
- Top scorer: Jordan Brown (4)
- All-time series: Cavalry: 14; Draw: 3 Edmonton: 0
- Largest victory: Edmonton 0–3 Cavalry; Canadian Premier League (June 15, 2019); Edmonton 0–3 Cavalry; Canadian Premier League (May 6, 2022)
- Longest win streak: Cavalry FC (5) (Sep 11, 2019 – Aug 15, 2021) (May 6, 2022 – Sep 17, 2022)
- Longest unbeaten streak: Cavalry FC (17) (May 18, 2019 – Sep 17, 2022)

Cavalry FC v FC Edmonton, referred to as the Al Classico or Battle of Alberta, was an inter-city soccer rivalry between Alberta-based clubs Cavalry FC and FC Edmonton. It was one of several sporting rivalries between the two largest cities of the province. The rivalry ended in 2022 when FC Edmonton folded.

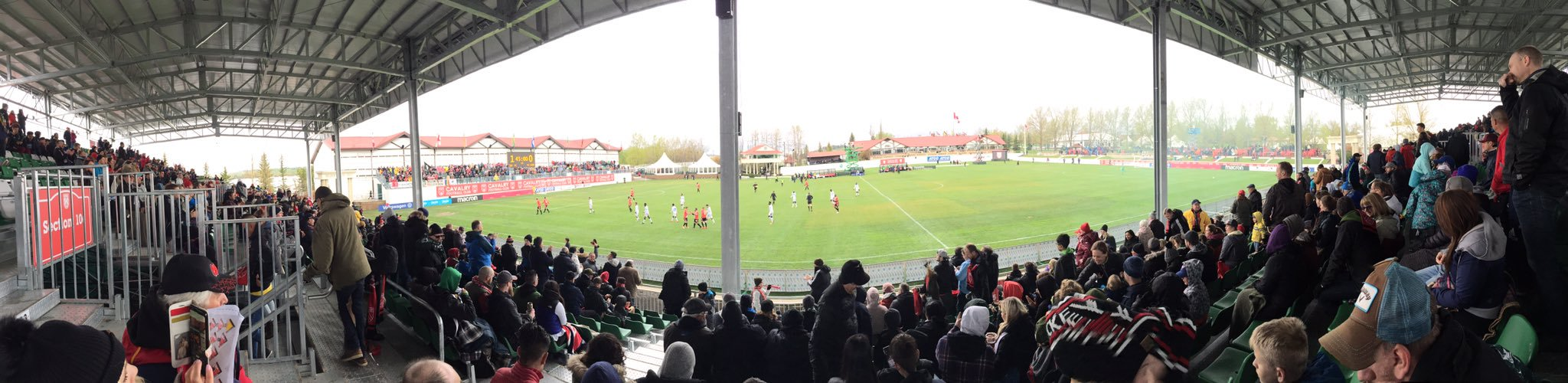
a fixture at ATCO Field

The Wildrose Cup was awarded annually to the team that wins the most points from the series in league play.

== History ==
The first edition of the Al Classico took place in 2018, when FC Edmonton's Academy played provincial rivals Calgary Foothills FC in two friendly games to help them prepare for their upcoming season. The fixtures were also used to gauge Edmonton's interest into a potential return to join the Canadian Premier League.

In May and June respectively, it was announced that Cavalry FC, based in Calgary, and FC Edmonton would be joining the Canadian Premier League, where the rivalry would continue. In preparation for their inaugural Canadian Premier League seasons, Cavalry FC announced they would host a match between a Cavalry FC Prospects and FC Edmonton Prospects side on September 29, to be followed by a rematch on October 20 at Clarke Stadium in Edmonton.

On September 11, 2019, Cavalry FC clinched the first-ever Wildrose Cup with a 1–0 win over FC Edmonton.

== Results ==
Cavalry win Draw Edmonton win

Competition	Date	Home team	Result	Away team	Venue	Attendance	Reference
2019 CPL	May 18, 2019	Cavalry	1–0	Edmonton	ATCO Field, Foothills County	4,000	
2019 CPL	June 15, 2019	Edmonton	0–3	Cavalry	Clarke Stadium, Edmonton	3,256	
2019 CPL	August 16, 2019	Cavalry	0–0	Edmonton	ATCO Field, Foothills County	3,650	
2019 CPL	September 11, 2019	Edmonton	0–1	Cavalry	Clarke Stadium, Edmonton	2,790	
2019 CPL	October 19, 2019	Cavalry	3–1	Edmonton	ATCO Field, Foothills County	3,492	
2020 CPL	August 20, 2020	Edmonton	0–2	Cavalry	Alumni Field, Charlottetown	0	
2021 CPL	August 3, 2021	Cavalry	2–1	Edmonton	ATCO Field, Foothills County	2,418	
2021 Canadian Championship	August 15, 2021	Edmonton	0–2	Cavalry	Clarke Stadium, Edmonton	1,189	
2021 CPL	August 29, 2021	Cavalry	2–2	Edmonton	ATCO Field, Foothills County	3,489	
2021 CPL	September 1, 2021	Edmonton	0–1	Cavalry	Clarke Stadium, Edmonton	470	
2021 CPL	September 29, 2021	Edmonton	2–3	Cavalry	Clarke Stadium, Edmonton	991	
2021 CPL	October 9, 2021	Cavalry	1–1	Edmonton	ATCO Field, Foothills County	3,102	
2022 CPL	May 6, 2022	Edmonton	0–3	Cavalry	Clarke Stadium, Edmonton	1,044	
2022 Canadian Championship	May 10, 2022	Cavalry	2–1	Edmonton	ATCO Field, Foothills County	2,229	
2022 CPL	June 26, 2022	Cavalry	3–1	Edmonton	ATCO Field, Foothills County	4,743	
2022 CPL	July 30, 2022	Cavalry	2–0	Edmonton	ATCO Field, Foothills County	3,446	
2022 CPL	September 17, 2022	Edmonton	0–1	Cavalry	Clarke Stadium, Edmonton	1,505	

== All time results ==
As of October 25, 2022

Competitions	Matches	Wins		Draws	Goals	
Competitions	Matches	CAV	EDM	Draws	CAV	EDM
Canadian Premier League	15	12	0	3	28	8
Canadian Championship	2	2	0	0	4	1
Total matches	17	14	0	3	32	9

== Top goalscorers ==
As of October 9, 2021. Competitive matches only. Players in bold are still playing with either team.

Pos	Name	Club	Nationality	Goals
1	Jordan Brown	Cavalry FC	England	4
2	Joe Mason	Cavalry FC	Republic of Ireland	3
2	Easton Ongaro	FC Edmonton	Canada	3
4	**Sergio Camargo**	Cavalry FC	Canada	2
4	Ben Fisk	Cavalry FC	Canada	2
4	**Daan Klomp**	Cavalry FC	Netherlands	2
7	**Fraser Aird**	Cavalry FC	Canada	1
7	Joseph Di Chiara	Cavalry FC	Canada	1
7	Amer Đidić	FC Edmonton	Canada	1
7	**José Escalante**	Cavalry FC	Honduras	1
7	Azriel Gonzalez	FC Edmonton	United States	1
7	Nikolas Ledgerwood	Cavalry FC	Canada	1
7	Richard Luca	Cavalry FC	Brazil	1
7	Anthony Novak	Cavalry FC	Canada	1
7	Nico Pasquotti	Cavalry FC	Canada	1
7	Ahinga Selemani	Cavalry FC	United States	1
7	Marcus Velado-Tsegaye	FC Edmonton	El Salvador	1

== League ranking by season ==
P.	2019		2020		2021		2022	
P.	Season	Finals	Season	Playoffs	Season	Playoffs	Season	Playoffs
1	**1**		**1**					
2		**RU**			**2**			
3				**3**		**SF**	**3**	**SF**
4	**4**							
5								
6								
7					**7**			
8			**8**				**8**	

== Players who played for both clubs ==
=== Cavalry, then Edmonton ===
- (Canada) Gabriel Bitar (Cavalry 2019; Edmonton 2022)

=== Edmonton, then Cavalry ===
- (Canada) Ben Fisk (Edmonton 2016–2017; Cavalry 2021–2023)
- (Canada) Bruno Zebie (Edmonton 2015–2017, 2019; Cavalry 2020)
- (Canada) Fraser Aird (Edmonton 2021; Cavalry 2022–2025)
- (Canada) Joseph Holliday (Edmonton 2022; Cavalry 2024–present)
- (Canada) Mauro Eustáquio (Edmonton 2017; Cavalry 2019)
- (Canada) Nikolas Ledgerwood (Edmonton 2016–2017; Cavalry 2019–2021)
- (Canada) Shamit Shome (Edmonton 2016, 2021–2022; Cavalry 2023–2025)
- (Germany) Tobias Warschewski (Edmonton 2021–2022; Cavalry 2024–present)
- (Canada) Tyson Farago (Edmonton 2014–2017; Cavalry 2021–2022)
- (Canada) Nathan Ingham (Edmonton 2017; Cavalry 2026–present)
- (Canada) Amer Didić (Edmonton 2019–2021; Cavalry 2026–present)

== Wildrose Cup results ==
All time results

Team	Titles	Largest victory (points per game)
Cavalry FC	3	2022 (3 ppg)
FC Edmonton	0	—

2022 Wildrose Cup

Pos	Team	Pld	W	D	L	GF	GA	GD	Pts
1	Cavalry FC	4	4	0	0	9	1	+8	**12**
2	FC Edmonton	4	0	0	4	1	9	−8	**0**

Season by season Wins, draws, and losses are recorded from the winner's perspective.
Season	Winner	Total points	W	D	L
2019	Cavalry FC	13–1	4	1	0
2020	Cancelled due to COVID-19 pandemic.				
2021	Cavalry FC (2)	11–2	3	2	0
2022	Cavalry FC (3)	12–0	4	0	0

== See also ==
- 905 Derby
- Pacific FC–Vancouver FC rivalry
- Cavalry FC–Forge FC rivalry
- Canadian Classique
