= 2018–19 Oman Professional League =

Oman Professional League
- Season: 2018–19
- Champions: Dhofar
- Relegated: Al-Shabab, Sur, Majees
- Matches: 182
- Goals: 469 (2.58 per match)
- Top goalscorer: (Oman) Mohammed Al-Ghassani (18 goals)

The 2018–19 Oman Professional League is the 43rd edition of the Oman Professional League, the top football league in Oman. The season started on August 17, 2018.

== Foreign players ==
Restricting the number of foreign players to four per team, including a slot for a player from AFC countries. A team could use four foreign players on the field during each game including at least one player from the AFC country.

Club	Player 1	Player 2	Player 3	AFC Player	GCC Player	Former Players
Al-Nahda						(Brazil) Alexandre (Brazil) Cléber (Brazil) Thiago Furtuoso
Al-Nasr	(Egypt) Fady Farid	(Nigeria) Daniel Etor	(Sierra Leone) Sheka Fofanah			
Al-Oruba						(Brazil) Vinícius Calamari
Al-Rustaq	(Ivory Coast) Armand Niamke					(Canada) Philippe Lincourt-Joseph
Al-Shabab	(Syria) Amro Jenyat					
Al-Suwaiq	(Brazil) Tiago Lopes	(Egypt) Eslam Abdelmeguid	(Syria) Thaer Krouma			(Brazil) Edson Reis
Dhofar	(Jordan) Odai Khadr					
Mirbat						(Liberia) Theo Lewis Weeks
Muscat	(Guinea) Moustapha Kouyaté	(Senegal) Abdou Fall				
Oman	(Brazil) Da Matta	(Brazil) Washington				(Brazil) Leandro Cearense
Saham	(Brazil) Tinga					(Brazil) Willen (Brazil) Evson (Iran) Amir Arsalan Motahari
Sur	(Mali) Samba Tounkara					

== League table ==
Pos	Team	Pld	W	D	L	GF	GA	GD	Pts	Qualification or relegation
1	Dhofar (C)	26	20	6	0	57	11	+46	66	Qualification for AFC Cup group stage
2	Al-Nasr	26	14	8	4	40	23	+17	50	
3	Al-Nahda	26	12	7	7	33	26	+7	43	
4	Al-Suwaiq	26	10	11	5	38	28	+10	41	
5	Al-Rustaq	26	11	7	8	30	23	+7	40	
6	Saham	26	11	5	10	37	39	−2	38	
7	Sohar	26	10	7	9	37	34	+3	37	
8	Al-Orouba	26	8	12	6	33	24	+9	36	
9	Muscat	26	8	6	12	31	36	−5	30	
10	Mirbat	26	8	6	12	25	35	−10	30	
11	Oman	26	8	3	15	28	45	−17	27	
12	Al-Shabab (R)	26	7	3	16	29	45	−16	24	Relegation to Oman First Division League
13	Sur (R)	26	4	8	14	26	48	−22	20	AFC Cup play-off round and relegation to Oman First Division League (Note: Sur qualified for the AFC Cup play-off round as Sultan Qaboos Cup winners.)
14	Majees (R)	26	4	5	17	15	42	−27	17	Relegation to Oman First Division League

Source: Goalzz
Rules for classification: 1) Points; 2) Goal difference; 3) Goals scored.
(C) Champions; (R) Relegated
Notes:
