= Ajeej Sarkaria =

Canadian soccer player

Personal information
- Full name: Ajeej Sarkaria
- Date of birth: 7 February 1995 (age 31)
- Place of birth: Edmonton, Alberta, Canada
- Height: 1.83 m (6 ft 0 in)
- Position: Forward

Youth career
- Edmonton Juventus
- 2011–2013: FC Edmonton

College career
Years	Team	Apps	(Gls)
2016–2018	Alberta Golden Bears	42	(37)

Senior career*
Years	Team	Apps	(Gls)
2013	FC Edmonton	0	(0)
2014–2015	SV Wehen Wiesbaden	0	(0)
2015	Fränsta IK	8	(6)
2015–2016	Vasalunds IF		
2019	FC Edmonton	10	(0)
- * Club domestic league appearances and goals as of 19 October 2019

Ajeej Sarkaria (born 7 February 1995) is a Canadian professional soccer player who last played for FC Edmonton as a forward.

== Club career ==
=== Early career ===
Sarkaria played youth soccer with Edmonton Juventus before joining local professional club FC Edmonton in 2011. In 2013, Sarkaria signed his first professional contract with Edmonton as a 17-year-old, but failed to make an appearance that season. He subsequently played overseas in Germany and Sweden before returning to Canada in 2016. In Europe, he joined German organization SV Wehen Wiesbaden and Swedish club Vasalunds IF, as well as briefly for Swedish lower division sixth tier side Fränsta IK, where he scored six goals in eight matches. While in Germany, as an 18 year old, he played with the U23 side, but also tore his MCL.

=== Calgary Foothills ===
In 2016, Sarkaria played for USL Premier Development League side Calgary Foothills, making twelve league appearances and adding another five in the playoffs. The following year, he made another thirteen league appearances, scoring one goal, and made another appearance in the playoffs. In 2018, Sarkaria made eight appearances, scoring three goals, and made another three appearances in the playoffs as the Foothills won the 2018 PDL Championship.

While playing for Calgary in the summer Sarkaria attended the University of Alberta, where he scored 37 goals in 42 appearances for the Golden Bears. In 2016, he was named the Canada West Player of the Year and in 2018, Sarkaria set the new all-time Canada West scoring record for career points.

=== FC Edmonton ===
In November 2018, Sarkaria was drafted in the second round, 8th overall in the 2018 CPL–U Sports Draft by his former club FC Edmonton. On 13 December 2018, he signed with Edmonton ahead of the club's inaugural season in the Canadian Premier League. On 18 May 2019, Sarkaria made his professional debut as a starter in the Al Classico derby against Cavalry FC. On November 4 Edmonton announced they were parting ways with Sarkaria following the end of the season.

== Honours ==
University of Alberta

- U Sports men's soccer Championship: 2016

Calgary Foothills

- Premier Development League Championship: 2018
