= 2018 CPL–U Sports Draft =

General information
- Sport: Soccer
- Date: November 12, 2018
- Location: Vancouver, British Columbia

Overview
- 21 total selections in 3 rounds
- League: Canadian Premier League
- Teams: 7
- First selection: Gabriel Bitar, Cavalry FC

The 2018 CPL–U Sports Draft was the inaugural CPL–U Sports Draft, held on November 12, 2018, in Vancouver, British Columbia. Seven Canadian Premier League (CPL) teams selected 21 U Sports athletes in total. The results were announced on November 13.

== Format ==
A blind draw was used to determine the draft order for the first round. A "snake draft" was used, with the order reversing in the second round, and then reversing back in the third and final round. Clubs had a window of time in which they must submit their pick, and failure to do so resulted in a pass. There was a break between each round, as well as one timeout per club. However, timeouts could not be used in back-to-back picks.

== Player selection ==
^{*}	Denotes player who signed a professional contract for the 2019 season
^{^}	Denotes player who signed a developmental contract for the 2019 season

=== Round 1 ===
Pick #	CPL team	Player	Position	Nationality	University
1	Cavalry FC	Gabriel Bitar^	Midfielder	Canada	Carleton
2	Valour FC	Dylan Carreiro*	Midfielder	Canada	York
3	Forge FC	Jace Kotsopoulos^	Forward	Canada	Guelph
4	York9 FC	Daniel Gogarty*	Defender	Canada	York
5	HFX Wanderers FC	Peter Schaale^	Defender	Germany	Cape Breton
6	Pacific FC	Thomas Gardner	Forward	Canada	British Columbia
7	FC Edmonton	Connor James*	Goalkeeper	Canada	Alberta

=== Round 2 ===
Pick #	CPL team	Player	Position	Nationality	University
8	FC Edmonton	Ajeej Sarkaria*	Forward	Canada	Alberta
9	Pacific FC	Zach Verhoven^	Forward	Canada	British Columbia
10	HFX Wanderers FC	André Bona*	Defender	France	UQAM
11	York9 FC	Emmanuel Zambazis*	Midfielder	Canada	York
12	Forge FC	Aboubacar Sissoko	Midfielder	Mali	Montréal
13	Valour FC	Lewis White	Defender	Scotland	Cape Breton
14	Cavalry FC	Joel Waterman*	Midfielder	Canada	Trinity Western

=== Round 3 ===
Pick #	CPL team	Player	Position	Nationality	University
15	Cavalry FC	Easton Ongaro (Note: Easton Ongaro was drafted by Cavalry but did not sign. He later joined FC Edmonton as a free agent.)	Forward	Canada	Alberta
16	Valour FC	Jack Simpson	Midfielder	Scotland	Cape Breton
17	Forge FC	Marko Mandekic	Midfielder	Canada	Toronto
18	York9 FC	Daniel Pritchard	Defender	England	Cape Breton
19	HFX Wanderers FC	Christian Oxner*	Goalkeeper	Canada	Saint Mary's
20	Pacific FC	Nick Fussell	Midfielder	Canada	British Columbia
21	FC Edmonton	Noah Cunningham	Defender	Canada	Alberta

== Selection statistics ==
=== Draftees by nationality ===
Rank	Country	Selections
1	Canada	15
2	Scotland	2
3	England	1
3	France	1
3	Germany	1
3	Mali	1

==== Canadian draftees by province ====
Rank	Province	Selections
1	Ontario	5
2	Alberta	4
2	British Columbia	4
4	Manitoba	1
4	Nova Scotia	1

=== Draftees by university ===
Rank	University	Selections
1	Cape Breton University	4
1	University of Alberta	4
3	York University	3
3	University of British Columbia	3
5	Carleton University	1
5	University of Guelph	1
5	Université du Québec à Montréal	1
5	Université de Montréal	1
5	Trinity Western University	1
5	University of Toronto	1
5	Saint Mary's University	1
