= Marcus Velado-Tsegaye =

Salvadoran footballer (born 2001)

Personal information
- Full name: Marcus William Velado-Tsegaye
- Date of birth: 1 July 2001 (age 25)
- Place of birth: Edmonton, Alberta, Canada
- Height: 1.72 m (5 ft 8 in)
- Position: Forward

Youth career
- Edmonton Xtreme FC
- Edmonton Drillers
- Edmonton Victoria
- 2016–2019: FC Edmonton

College career
Years	Team	Apps	(Gls)
2023–	Alberta Golden Bears	12	(4)

Senior career*
Years	Team	Apps	(Gls)
2019–2021	FC Edmonton	29	(3)
2023	Scrosoppi FC	10	(2)
2024–	Edmonton Scottish	12	(3)

International career
2020	El Salvador U20	1	(0)
- * Club domestic league appearances and goals as of May 2, 2025

Marcus William Velado-Tsegaye (born 1 July 2001) is a professional footballer who plays for Edmonton Scottish in League1 Alberta. Born in Canada, he represented El Salvador at youth international level.

== Early life ==
Velado-Tsegaye began playing soccer at age five with Edmonton Xtreme FC, later playing with the Edmonton Drillers SC and Edmonton Victoria SC. In 2016, he joined the FC Edmonton Academy. In 2018, he won the EDSA Premier Division double with the academy and scored eleven goals, finishing third among the league's top scorers.

== University career ==
In 2023, he began playing for the men's soccer team at the University of Alberta. On October 4, 2023, he scored a brace in a 2-0 victory over the MacEwan Griffins. At the end of the season, he was named a Canada West First Team All-Star.

== Club career ==
In February 2019, Velado-Tsegaye signed his first professional contract with Edmonton ahead of the side's inaugural season in the Canadian Premier League. On 18 May 2019, he made his debut in a substitute appearance against Cavalry FC. On 1 July 2019, which was his 18th birthday, he scored his first professional goal against the HFX Wanderers. In 2020, he was named to the CPL's Top 23 under 23 list. In November 2020, he re-signed with the club for the 2021 season. In February 2022, the club announced that Velado-Tsegaye and all but two other players would not be returning for the 2022 season.

In 2023, he played with Scrosoppi FC in League1 Ontario.

== International career ==
Velado-Tsegaye was born in Canada to an Ethiopian/Eritrean father and a Salvadoran mother.

In December 2015, Velado-Tsegaye participated in a Canadian U14 identification camp.

In October 2020, in an interview with El Salvador scout Hugo Alvarado, he mentioned that the team was in contact with Velado-Tsegaye. The following month, he was invited to a camp with the El Salvador U20 team. He attended another camp the following month. In December 2020, he received his Salvadorean passport, allowing him to be eligible to represent the nation at international level. He made his debut on 14 December 2020 in a friendly against Nicaragua U20.

In July 2023, he was called up to the Ethiopia national team, ahead of friendlies in early August against Guyana and a US club side. On August 5, he started in an unofficial friendly against club side Loudoun United of the USL Championship.

== Career statistics ==
As of July 26, 2024

Club	Season	League			Playoffs		Domestic Cup		Other		Total	
Club	Season	Division	Apps	Goals	Apps	Goals	Apps	Goals	Apps	Goals	Apps	Goals
FC Edmonton	2019	Canadian Premier League	16	1	–		2	0	–		18	1
FC Edmonton	2020	Canadian Premier League	4	1	–		–		–		4	1
FC Edmonton	2021	Canadian Premier League	9	1	–		0	0	–		9	1
FC Edmonton	Total		29	3	0	0	2	0	0	0	31	3
Scrosoppi FC	2023	League1 Ontario	10	2	0	0	–		–		10	2
Edmonton Scottish	2024	League1 Alberta	11	3	1	0	–		–		12	3
Career total			50	8	1	0	2	0	0	0	53	8
