= Philippe Lincourt-Joseph =

Canadian professional soccer player (born 1994)

Personal information
- Full name: Philippe Lincourt-Joseph
- Date of birth: November 3, 1994 (age 32)
- Place of birth: Laval, Quebec, Canada
- Height: 1.72 m (5 ft 8 in)
- Position: Midfielder

Youth career
- Étoiles de L'Est
- Chomedey
- CS Monteuil
- 2008–2011: FC Boisbriand
- 2012–2014: Montreal Impact

Senior career*
Years	Team	Apps	(Gls)
2014	Montreal Impact U23	13	(0)
2015–2016	FC Montreal	42	(0)
2017–2018	Fátima	7	(1)
2018	Al-Rustaq		
2019	FC Edmonton	11	(0)
- * Club domestic league appearances and goals as of 19 October 2019

Philippe Lincourt-Joseph (born November 1, 1994) is a Canadian professional soccer player who played as a midfielder.

== Early life ==
Lincourt-Joseph was born in Laval, Canada, a suburb of Montreal. At the youth level, he played for Montreal-area clubs Les Étoiles de L'Est, CS Chomedey, CS Monteuil, and FC Boisbriand before joining Montreal Impact Academy in 2012.

== Club career ==
=== Montreal Impact ===
Lincourt-Joseph played with the Montreal Impact Academy in the Canadian Soccer League's first division in 2012. The Impact would secure a playoff berth by finishing second in the division, and he also helped the team produce a nine-game undefeated streak. In the first round of the postseason, Montreal would defeat Toronto FC's academy to advance to the next round. Montreal would defeat the York Region Shooters in the next round, securing a berth in the championship finals. He would participate in the championship final match against Toronto Croatia, where Montreal was defeated.

He would also make an appearance with the Montreal Impact's reserve squad in the MLS reserve division in 2013. After Montreal departed from the CSL in 2013, he played with the youth squad in the U.S. Soccer Development Academy.

In 2014, he continued playing with Montreal's youth team, this time in the American-based Premier Development League.

=== FC Montreal ===
On March 13, 2015, it was announced that Lincourt-Joseph would join FC Montreal, a USL affiliate club of the Montreal Impact, for their inaugural season. He made his professional debut for the club on March 28 in a 2–0 defeat to Toronto FC II. He re-signed with the club the following season. Throughout his two seasons with Montreal, he appeared in 42 matches.

=== Fátima ===
In 2017, Lincourt-Joseph signed with Portuguese third-division club C.D. Fátima. In total, he played in 7 matches and scored 1 goal.

=== Al-Rustaq ===
In July 2018, Lincourt-Joseph signed with Oman Professional League club Al-Rustaq SC.

=== FC Edmonton ===
On 26 February 2019, Lincourt-Joseph signed with Canadian Premier League side FC Edmonton. He made his debut for Edmonton on May 12, 2019, against Pacific FC. Lincourt-Joseph also made his debut in the Canadian Championship on June 5, 2019, against York 9. In his debut season in the Canadian circuit, he made 11 league appearances. At the end of the season, Edmonton announced he would not be returning to the team for the 2020 season.

== Honors ==
Montreal Impact Academy

- CSL Championship Runners-up: 2012
