= Allan Zebie =

Canadian soccer player (born 1993)

Personal information
- Full name: Allan Hugues Zebie
- Date of birth: May 29, 1993 (age 33)
- Place of birth: Rueil-Malmaison, France
- Height: 1.70 m (5 ft 7 in)
- Position: Defender

Youth career
- Lachine SC
- FC Sélect Rive-Sud
- Edmonton Juventus SC
- 2012–2013: FC Edmonton

College career
Years	Team	Apps	(Gls)
2013–2014	NAIT Ooks		

Senior career*
Years	Team	Apps	(Gls)
2015–2017	FC Edmonton	54	(1)
2019–2021	FC Edmonton	39	(0)
Total		93	(1)

Managerial career
- 2022: FC Edmonton (assistant)
- * Club domestic league appearances and goals as of October 19, 2021 ‡ National team caps and goals as of May 4, 2015

Allan Hugues Zebie (born May 29, 1993) is a soccer coach and former player. Born in France, Zebie was called up to Canadian youth teams as a player.

== Early life ==
Zebie was born in Rueil-Malmaison, France to Ivorian parents. He acquired French nationality on 29 July 1999, through the collective effect of his parents' naturalization.

He moved to Lachine, Quebec at age nine, later moving to Brossard, Quebec. He began playing soccer at age six in Paris, and began playing soccer in Canada with Lachine SC. His family then moved to Edmonton when he was 15. He later joined the FC Edmonton Academy. He then headed to Europe, where he trialed with English club Leeds United and Scottish club Rangers.

== Club career ==
In 2014, he returned to FC Edmonton, where he trained with the first team for the second half of the season. In January 2015, he signed a professional contract with FC Edmonton to play in the North American Soccer League. He made his debut for Edmonton on May 3 against Minnesota United FC as a substitute for Albert Watson in a 2–2 draw. Zebie would spend three seasons with FC Edmonton, before the club ceased operations after the 2017 season.

Zebie was announced as part of the roster of the re-launched FC Edmonton in the new Canadian Premier League on November 29, 2018. On November 27, 2019, Zebie re-signed with Edmonton for the 2020 season. He once again re-signed for the 2021 season. On November 14, 2021, he announced his retirement from the sport.

== International career ==
Zebie was a member of the Canada U-20 team that participated at the 2013 CONCACAF U-20 Championship. He was an unused substitute in all of Canada's games at the tournament.

== Coaching career ==
On April 7, 2022, Zebie was named as an assistant coach at FC Edmonton under Alan Koch.

== Personal life ==
His younger brother Bruno was also a soccer player.

== Career statistics ==
As of November 13, 2021

Club	League	Season	League		Playoffs		National Cup		Total	
Club	League	Season	Apps	Goals	Apps	Goals	Apps	Goals	Apps	Goals
FC Edmonton	North American Soccer League	2015	21	0	—		1	0	22	0
FC Edmonton	North American Soccer League	2016	11	0	—		1	0	12	0
FC Edmonton	North American Soccer League	2017	22	1	—		2	0	24	1
FC Edmonton	Canadian Premier League	2019	23	0	—		0	0	23	0
FC Edmonton	Canadian Premier League	2020	5	0	—		—		5	0
FC Edmonton	Canadian Premier League	2021	11	0	—		0	0	11	0
Career Total			93	1	0	0	4	0	97	1
