= Mélé Temguia =

German footballer

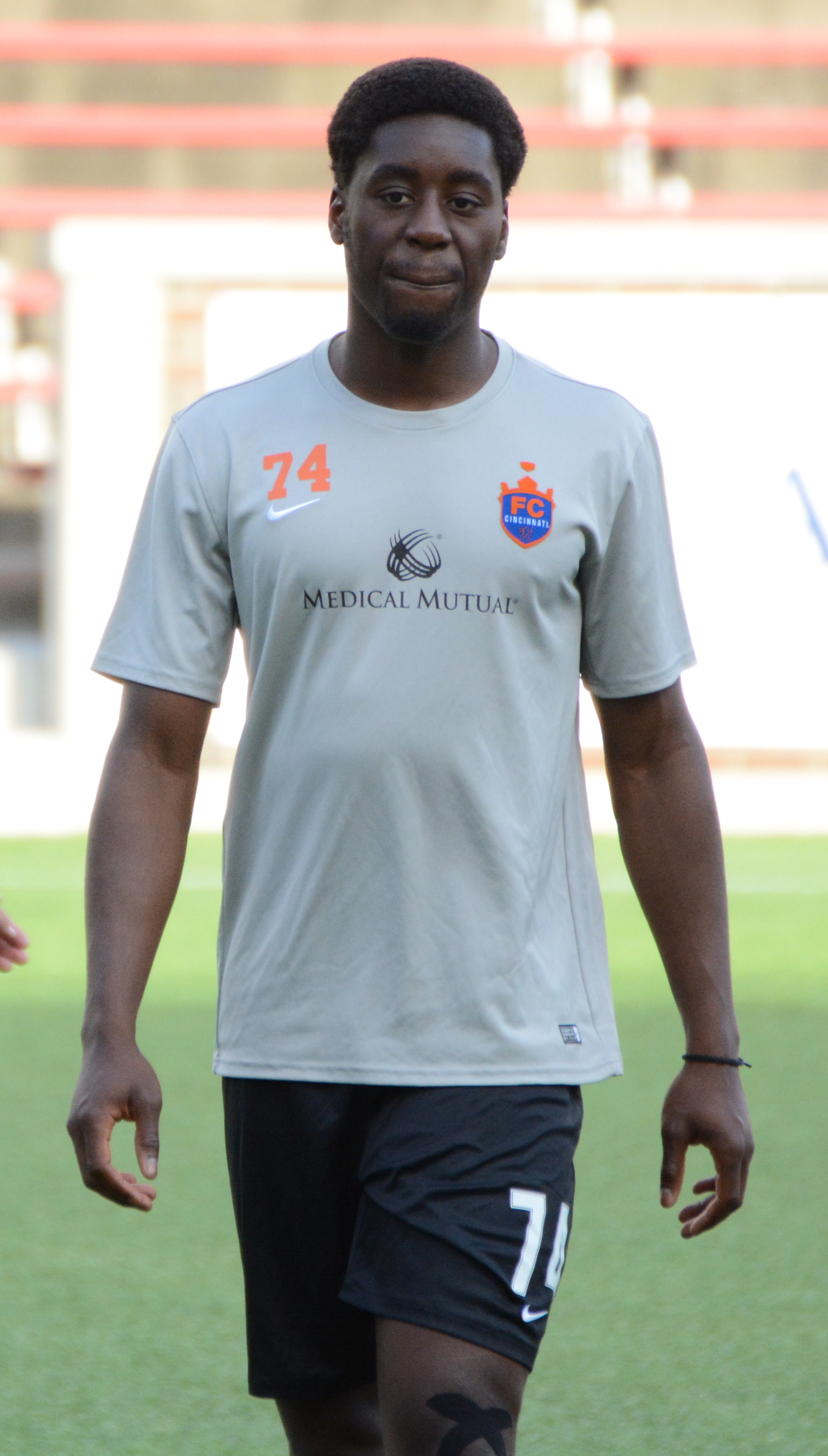
- Temguia with FC Cincinnati in 2017

Personal information
- Full name: Ngoufack Mélé Temguia
- Date of birth: 1 August 1995 (age 31)
- Place of birth: Darmstadt, Germany
- Height: 1.88 m (6 ft 2 in)
- Position: Centre-back

Youth career
- 2009–2011: Verts de Sherbrooke
- 2012–2015: Montreal Impact

Senior career*
Years	Team	Apps	(Gls)
2015–2016	FC Montreal	22	(0)
2017	FC Cincinnati	1	(0)
2018	Hume City	11	(1)
2018	Valentine Phoenix	9	(0)
2019–2021	FC Edmonton	53	(2)
2022	Forward Madison	16	(1)
2023	PEPO	15	(0)
- * Club domestic league appearances and goals as of 04:43, 4 July 2024 (UTC)

Ngoufack Mélé Temguia (born 1 August 1995) is a German professional footballer who most recently played as a centre-back for Finnish club PEPO

== Early life ==
Temguia was born in Darmstadt, Germany before moving to Montreal, Quebec as a child. He played youth football with Sherbrooke-based club Verts de Sherbrooke until 2011, when he joined the academy of professional club Montreal Impact.

== Career ==
=== FC Montreal ===
After spending four years with the Montreal Impact Academy, Temguia joined the club's new reserve side, FC Montreal, in the USL. He made his professional debut on 11 April 2015 in a 3–0 defeat to the Rochester Rhinos.

=== FC Cincinnati ===
In March 2017, FC Cincinnati announced that they had signed Temguia for the 2017 USL season. Following the end of the season, the club announced that Temguia's contract had expired and would not be renewed.

=== Hume City ===
In April 2018, Temguia signed with Australian NPL Victoria side Hume City FC, joining former FC Montreal teammate Zachary Sukunda. He made eleven appearances and scored one goal before leaving Hume mid-season.

=== Valentine Phoenix ===
On 19 June 2018, Temguia signed with NPL Northern New South Wales side Valentine Phoenix FC. He made nine appearances for Valentine that season.

=== FC Edmonton ===
On 26 February 2019, Temguia signed with Canadian Premier League club FC Edmonton. In his debut on 4 May 2019, Temguia scored the club's first goal in the Canadian Premier League in a 2–1 win over Valour FC. That season, he made 27 league appearances, scoring two goals, and made another two appearances in the Canadian Championship. On 27 November 2019, Temguia re-signed with Edmonton for the 2020 season. On 9 February 2022, the club announced that Temguia and all but two other players would not be returning for the 2022 season.

=== Forward Madison FC ===
On 4 March 2022, it was announced that Temguia signed with USL League One club Forward Madison FC.
