= Easton Ongaro =

Canadian soccer player

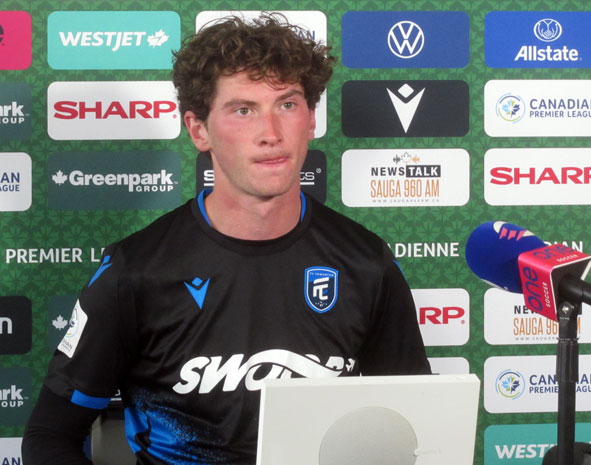
- Ongaro in 2021

Personal information
- Date of birth: June 5, 1998 (age 28)
- Place of birth: Edmonton, Alberta, Canada
- Height: 1.99 m (6 ft 6 1/2 in)
- Position: Forward

Team information
- Current team: Pianese (on loan from Trapani)
- Number: 9

College career
Years	Team	Apps	(Gls)
2017–2018	Alberta Golden Bears	26	(20)

Senior career*
Years	Team	Apps	(Gls)
2019–2021	FC Edmonton	55	(25)
2020	→ Vendsyssel FF (loan)	7	(2)
2022	UTA Arad	6	(1)
2022	Whitecaps FC 2	7	(3)
2022	→ Vancouver Whitecaps FC (loan)	1	(0)
2023	Pacific FC	32	(6)
2024–2025	Novara	37	(8)
2025–2026	Trapani	10	(1)
2025–2026	→ Pianese (loan)	15	(3)
2026–	Barletta	0	(0)
- * Club domestic league appearances and goals as of September 13, 2026

Easton Ongaro (born June 5, 1998) is a Canadian professional soccer player who plays as a forward for Serie C Group B club Pianese, on loan from Serie D Group I side Trapani.

== Club career ==
=== Amateur career ===
In 2016, Ongaro began playing at the senior amateur level in the Alberta Major Soccer League with the Edmonton Green & Gold, scoring two goals in eight appearances that season. The following season he doubled his tally, scoring four goals in thirteen appearances. In 2018, Ongaro led the league in scoring with thirteen goals in nine appearances.

=== Turning professional in Canada ===
In October 2018, Ongaro was selected 15th overall in the 2018 CPL–U Sports Draft by Calgary-based club Cavalry FC.

In May 2019, Ongaro signed with his hometown club, FC Edmonton, after he was released by Cavalry FC. On 12 June 2019, Ongaro made his debut as a substitute against York9 FC in the Canadian Championship. The following weekend he made his league debut as a substitute in the Al Classico against his draft club, Cavalry FC. He scored his first goal for Edmonton on July 27 against Forge FC. Ongaro finished the season with a team-high ten goals in 21 league appearances, finishing fourth among the league's top scorers. On 12 November 2019, Ongaro re-signed with FC Edmonton on a multi-year contract. Edmonton had a disastrous shortened 2020 season, managing only a single point in seven games. Nevertheless, Ongaro again led the club in goals, scoring three while playing in every game. In 2021, he had a slow start to the season, but by August began to get into excellent form, developing a partnership with new signing Tobias Warschewski, who assisted many of his goals. Ultimately, Ongaro again had an individually successful season, while his team's season was disappointing, as the Eddies finished in seventh place. However, Ongaro scored 12 goals in 27 appearances, good for second league-wide. Upon completion of the season, Ongaro would express a desire to play in Europe, and eventually signed in Romania. After three seasons with Edmonton he left as the Canadian Premier League's all-time top goalscorer, with 25 goals.

==== Loan to Vendsyssel FF ====
On 4 October 2020, Ongaro was loaned to Danish 1st Division side Vendsyssel FF until the end of the calendar year. The deal also included an option to buy at the end of the loan period. He made his debut on 7 October in a Danish Cup tie against Aarhus Fremad. On 31 December 2020, Vendsyssel declined the option to purchase Ongaro at the end of the loan, and he returned to Edmonton for the 2021 season.

=== Romania ===
On 12 January 2022, Ongaro signed with Romanian side UTA Arad of Liga I. He made his first appearance for the club on January 23 against Gaz Metan Mediaș. Ongaro scored his first goal for UTA Arad on February 18, netting a late equalizer in a 1–1 draw against Universitatea Craiova. He departed the club in May 2022, after a spell that was marred by injury. After departing Arad, he went to train with his former club FC Edmonton, with no plans to join the club on a permanent contract, only to train for fitness.

=== Return to Canada ===
In July 2022, he signed with Whitecaps FC 2 in MLS Next Pro. He made his debut on July 24, scoring two goals against Colorado Rapids 2. In August, he signed a short-term loan with the first team for their match against the LA Galaxy on August 13.

On November 15, 2022, Ongaro officially returned to the Canadian Premier League, signing with Pacific FC. In his only season with the Vancouver Island-based club, he scored six goals and two assists in 32 appearances through all competitions.

=== Italy ===
On January 17, 2024, Ongaro joined Italian side Novara for an undisclosed fee, signing a contract until June 2025 with the club.

On January 31, 2025, Ongaro moved to another Serie C club Trapani. In July 2025, he was loaned to fellow Serie C side Pianese.

== International career ==
Ongaro was named to the Canadian U-23 provisional roster for the 2020 CONCACAF Men's Olympic Qualifying Championship on 26 February 2020.

== Personal life ==
He is the nephew of former Canadian professional soccer player Ross Ongaro. He also holds an Italian passport.

== Career statistics ==
As of September 7, 2025

Club statistics
Club	Season	League			Playoffs		National Cup (Note: Includes appearances in the Canadian Championship and Danish Cup.)		Other (Note: Includes appearances in the Coppa Italia Serie C.)		Total	
Club	Season	Division	Apps	Goals	Apps	Goals	Apps	Goals	Apps	Goals	Apps	Goals
FC Edmonton	2019	Canadian Premier League	21	10	—		1	0	0	0	22	10
FC Edmonton	2020	Canadian Premier League	7	3	—		—		0	0	7	3
FC Edmonton	2021	Canadian Premier League	27	12	—		1	0	0	0	28	12
FC Edmonton	Total		55	25	0	0	2	0	0	0	57	25
Vendsyssel FF (loan)	2020–21	Danish 1st Division	7	2	—		1	0	0	0	8	2
UTA Arad	2021–22	Liga I	6	1	—		0	0	0	0	6	1
Whitecaps FC 2	2022	MLS Next Pro	7	3	—		—		0	0	7	3
Vancouver Whitecaps FC (loan)	2022	MLS	1	0	0	0	0	0	0	0	1	0
Pacific FC	2023	Canadian Premier League	26	5	3	0	3	1	0	0	32	6
Novara	2023–24	Serie C	14	3	2	0	0	0	0	0	16	3
Novara	2024–25	Serie C	22	7	0	0	0	0	2	1	24	8
Novara	Total		36	10	2	0	0	0	2	1	40	11
Trapani	2024–25	Serie C	10	1	0	0	0	0	1	0	11	1
Pianese (loan)	2025–26	Serie C	12	1	0	0	0	0	0	0	12	1
Career total			160	48	5	0	6	1	3	1	174	50
