= David Doe =

Liberian professional footballer (born 2000)

Personal information
- Date of birth: January 22, 2000 (age 26)
- Place of birth: Monrovia, Liberia
- Height: 1.80 m (5 ft 11 in)
- Position: Defender

Team information
- Current team: Edmonton BTB SC
- Number: 3

Youth career
- St. Albert Impact
- Edmonton Juventus SC
- 2015–2018: FC Edmonton

College career
Years	Team	Apps	(Gls)
2018	NAIT Ooks	10	(13)

Senior career*
Years	Team	Apps	(Gls)
2017	FC Edmonton	4	(0)
2019–2020	FC Edmonton	9	(0)
2021	South Bend Lions FC	12	(0)
2024–	Edmonton BTB SC	38	(1)
- * Club domestic league appearances and goals as of September 9, 2026

David Doe (born January 22, 2000) is a Liberian footballer who plays for Edmonton BTB SC in League1 Alberta.

== Early life ==
Born in Liberia, Doe moved to Canada with his family as a child. Doe played youth soccer with the St. Albert Impact and Edmonton Juventus, winning a national title with the latter in 2016. In 2015, he joined the FC Edmonton Academy.

== College career ==
In 2018, Doe attended Northern Alberta Institute of Technology, where he played for the men's soccer team. At the end of the season, he was named to the All-ACAC Team. He helped NAIT win the ACAC title and finish sixth at the CCAA nationals, scoring 13 goals and leading the ACAC with 23 points in ten regular season matches.

== Club career ==
In August 2017, Doe signed a professional contract with North American Soccer League side FC Edmonton. He made his professional debut on October 6 against the Jacksonville Armada. After FC Edmonton folded their professional team after the 2017 season, he re-joined the FC Edmonton Academy.

In February 2019, Doe signed with the reformed FC Edmonton professional side ahead of the inaugural Canadian Premier League season.

In April 2021, Doe signed with USL League Two expansion club South Bend Lions FC.

In 2024, he joined Edmonton BTB SC in League1 Alberta.

== International career ==
In February 2016, Doe made his debut in the Canadian national team program, attending a training camp with the Canada U17 team. He was called up to another camp in October 2016.

== Personal life ==
Doe is close friends with Canadian national team player Alphonso Davies.
