= Edem Mortotsi =

Ghanaian football coach and former footballer (born 1993)

Personal information
- Full name: Edem Mortotsi
- Date of birth: 16 April 1993 (age 33)
- Place of birth: Accra, Ghana
- Height: 1.78 m (5 ft 10 in)
- Position: Midfielder

Team information
- Current team: Young Africans (fitness coach)

Youth career
- 2005–2011: KC Trojans
- 2012: FC Edmonton

College career
Years	Team	Apps	(Gls)
- NAIT

Senior career*
Years	Team	Apps	(Gls)
2013–2014	FC Edmonton	12	(0)
2017	Edmonton Victoria	10	(2)
2017–2018	Edmonton Green & Gold	6	(1)
2019–2020	FC Edmonton	18	(0)
Total		46	(3)
- * Club domestic league appearances and goals as of 27 January 2021

Edem Mortotsi (born 16 April 1993) is a Ghanaian football coach and former player who serves as the head fitness coach for Tanzanian club Young Africans.

== Early life ==
Mortotsi was born in Accra, Ghana and emigrated to Canada at a young age. While in high school Mortotsi played with KC Trojans from the U12 level to the U18s. He then attended university at Northern Alberta Institute of Technology, where he played soccer.

== Club career ==
=== FC Edmonton ===
After playing with the reserve side of FC Edmonton Mortotsi signed with the first-team for the 2013 season. He then made his debut for the club on 6 April 2013 against the Fort Lauderdale Strikers in which he came on in the 79th minute for Michael Cox as FC Edmonton drew the match 1–1.

=== Edmonton Victoria ===
In 2017, Mortotsi played for Alberta Major Soccer League side Edmonton Victoria, scoring two goals in ten appearances.

=== Edmonton Green & Gold ===
At the end of the 2017 season, Mortotsi joined the Edmonton Green & Gold, making one appearance and scoring one goal that year. He remained with the Green & Gold in the 2018 season, making five appearances.

=== Return to FC Edmonton ===
On 31 January 2019, Mortotsi returned to FC Edmonton. That season, he made eighteen league appearances. On 27 November 2019, Mortotsi re-signed with Edmonton for the 2020 season. In August 2020, he suffered an undisclosed season-ending injury while preparing for the shortened 2020 CPL season.

== Coaching career ==
On 27 January 2021, Mortotsi signed with Tanzanian Premier League side Young Africans as the club's head fitness coach.

== Career statistics ==
Statistics accurate as of 2 November 2014

Club	Season	League		Domestic Cup		Other		CONCACAF		Total	
Club	Season	Apps	Goals	Apps	Goals	Apps	Goals	Apps	Goals	Apps	Goals
FC Edmonton	2013	9	0	1	0	0	0	—	—	10	0
FC Edmonton	2014	4	0	1	0	0	0	—	—	2	0
Career total		13	0	1	0	0	0	0	0	12	0
