= Adriano da Matta =

Brazilian footballer (born 1988)

Personal information
- Birth name: Adriano Inàcio da Matta
- Date of birth: 12 July 1988 (age 38)
- Place of birth: São Paulo, Brazil
- Height: 1.73 m (5 ft 8 in)
- Position: Midfielder

Team information
- Current team: EC Água Santa

Youth career
- 2006–2007: Real Brasil

Senior career*
Years	Team	Apps	(Gls)
2007	Real Brasil		
2008	Palestra de São Bernardo		
2008–2009	Ibiza-Eivissa		
2009–2010	Pro Vercelli		
2011	Esporte Clube Vitória		
2011	Marília		
2011–2013	Monza		
2013–2014	Serrano Sport Club		
2014	Jacuipense		
2015–2016	Goianésia		
2016–2017	Luverdense		
2016	→Aparecidense (loan)		
2017	Oeste		
2017–	EC Água Santa		
- * Club domestic league appearances and goals as of 23 May 2017

Adriano Inàcio da Matta (born 12 July 1988) is a Brazilian footballer.

He is the author of the assist to Wendell Lira's goal, Puskás' award winner in 2015.
