= Connor James (soccer) =

Canadian soccer player

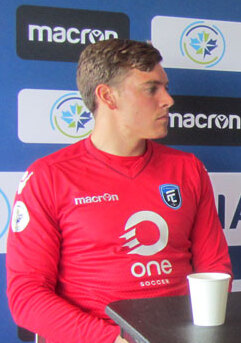

Personal information
- Date of birth: 17 July 1996 (age 30)
- Place of birth: Edmonton, Alberta, Canada
- Height: 1.85 m (6 ft 1 in)
- Position: Goalkeeper

Youth career
- Southwest United
- FC Edmonton

College career
Years	Team	Apps	(Gls)
2014–2018	Alberta Golden Bears	67	(0)

Senior career*
Years	Team	Apps	(Gls)
2014	FC Edmonton	0	(0)
2019–2021	FC Edmonton	52	(0)
Total		52	(0)
- * Club domestic league appearances and goals as of 6 November 2021

Connor James (born 17 July 1996) is a Canadian former professional soccer player who played as a goalkeeper for FC Edmonton.

== Playing career ==
On 3 May 2014, James appeared on the bench for FC Edmonton in an NASL match against Fort Lauderdale Strikers. He would make another bench appearance that season in a Canadian Championship match against Montreal Impact.

From 2014 to 2019, James attended the University of Alberta, where he would make 67 appearances over five seasons for the Golden Bears. While attending university, James played at the amateur level for the Edmonton Green & Gold in the Alberta Major Soccer League, making a total of 23 appearances between 2016 and 2018.

In November 2018, James was selected in the first round of the CPL–U Sports Draft, seventh overall, by his former club FC Edmonton. On 17 January 2019, James officially signed with FC Edmonton. On 4 May 2019, James made his professional debut against Valour FC in the club's first match in the Canadian Premier League. That season, he made a total of 22 league appearances, and was one of the three goalkeepers nominated for the CPL Golden Glove. On 27 November 2019, James re-signed with Edmonton for the 2020 season. He once again signed another contract to keep him with Edmonton for the 2021 season on January 11, 2021. He announced his retirement following the conclusion of the 2021 season. Overall, James made 52 appearances for FC Edmonton, remaining as the club's number one goalkeeper for its first three years in the CPL, and collected twelve clean sheets. While these seasons were not successful for the Eddies, as they finished at or near the bottom of the table each time, James was often a bright spot, as seen from his 2019 Golden Glove nomination.
