= Jeff Paulus =

Canadian soccer player and coach

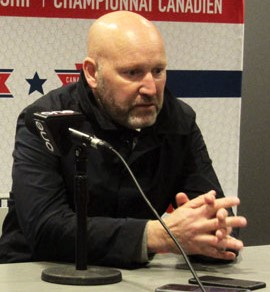
- Paulus in 2019

Personal information
- Full name: Jeffrey Paulus
- Date of birth: October 3, 1969 (age 57)
- Place of birth: Scarborough, Ontario, Canada
- Height: 1.80 m (5 ft 11 in)

Team information
- Current team: St Albert Impact (head coach)

Managerial career
- Years: Team
- 2004–2012: NAIT Ooks
- 2011–2017: FC Edmonton (assistant)
- 2011-2017: FC Edmonton (academy)
- 2018–2020: FC Edmonton
- 2023–2025: St Albert Impact
- 2026-: Edmonton Scottish (executive director)

Jeffrey Paulus (born October 3, 1969) is a Canadian former semi-professional soccer player and currently the executive director of Alberta Premier League club Edmonton Scottish, and the head coach of the NAIT Ooks Men's Soccer.

He coached the NAIT men's soccer team between 2004 and 2012 and was crowned Canadian College Athletic Association National Champions in his penultimate season. Having also worked for the Canadian Soccer Association for five years, Paulus joined FC Edmonton as assistant coach and Academy technical director in 2011. He was appointed as FC Edmonton's head coach in July 2018. He left FC Edmonton in November 2020 to work as the Technical Director of Edmonton Scottish. He rejoined the NAIT Men's soccer team, and joined St. Albert Impact as head coach of both teams in 2023. In 2026, Paulus rejoined Edmonton Scottish, as an executive director of the club.

== Playing career ==
Paulus played hockey and soccer as a child. Turning his sole attention to soccer in his teens, he played for local clubs St. Andrews, Maple Leaf and Woburn. He also played and coached while serving in the military in The Maritimes before moving to Alberta.

== Coaching career ==
=== Early career ===
Paulus joined the Northern Alberta Institute of Technology as head coach of the men's soccer program in August 2004. Paulus and his team were named Canadian College Athletic Association National Champions in October 2011. He left the position in November 2012 after eight seasons with the NAIT Ooks.

In September 2006, Paulus also joined the Canadian Soccer Association to coach national team prospects at the Prairies National Training Centre in Edmonton. He worked with players aged between 14 and 17 for five years until his departure in December 2011.

=== FC Edmonton ===
Upon his departure from the Canadian Soccer Association, Paulus joined North American Soccer League club FC Edmonton on a full-time basis. While acting as assistant coach to Colin Miller, he also worked in the academy as technical director. When the FC Edmonton senior team ceased operations in 2017, Paulus continued to lead the club's youth section.

On July 4, 2018, Paulus was named as the head coach of FC Edmonton after the club was re-founded to compete in the Canadian Premier League. He was then made the interim general manager of FC Edmonton on November 21, 2019, replacing Jay Ball. The club also announced that he would remain as the head coach for the 2020 Canadian Premier League season. Jeff Paulus stepped down as head coach of FC Edmonton on September 21, 2020.

== Personal life ==
Paulus was born in Scarborough, Ontario and raised in Toronto, Ontario. He graduated from Dalhousie University in 2002 with a degree in History and Sociology, and earned a Bachelor of Education from Acadia University two years later. In 2017, Paulus graduated from Athabasca University with a master's degree in Business Administration.

He served seven years in the Royal Canadian Navy and did a NATO tour to Poland onboard HMCS Halifax.

Paulus was a supporter of former North American Soccer League club the Toronto Blizzard. As a child, he would be a ball boy for the team at the Exhibition Stadium.

== Managerial statistics ==
As of November 24, 2019

Managerial record by team and tenure
Team	From	To	Record							
Team	From	To	P	W	D	L	Win %	GF	GA	GD
FC Edmonton	July 3, 2018	September 21, 2020	30	10	8	12	33.33	29	36	-7
Total			30	10	8	12	33.33	29	36	-7

== Honours ==
=== Manager ===
==== Northern Alberta Institute of Technology ====
- Canadian College Athletic Association National Champions – 2011
