= Bruno Zebie =

Canadian soccer player (born 1995)

Personal information
- Full name: Bruno Zebie
- Date of birth: August 14, 1995 (age 31)
- Place of birth: Cormeilles-en-Parisis, France
- Height: 1.65 m (5 ft 5 in)
- Position: Midfielder

Youth career
- CS St-Hubert
- Edmonton Juventus SC
- 2012–2015: FC Edmonton
- 2016–2017: Edmonton Green and Gold

College career
Years	Team	Apps	(Gls)
2016–2017	Alberta Golden Bears	16	(1)

Senior career*
Years	Team	Apps	(Gls)
2015	FC Edmonton	1	(0)
2017–2018	Calgary Foothills	26	(2)
2019	FC Edmonton	23	(1)
2020	Cavalry FC	10	(0)
Total		60	(3)

International career
2013	Canada U18	2	(0)

Managerial career
- 2022–: Alberta Golden Bears (assistant)
- * Club domestic league appearances and goals as of September 15, 2020

Bruno Zebie (born August 14, 1995) is a former professional soccer player who played as a midfielder. Born in France, Zebie represented Canada at youth level.

Zebie is currently an assistant coach for the men's soccer team at the University of Alberta.

== Early life ==
Zebie was born in Cormeilles-en-Parisis, France, to Ivorian parents. He acquired French nationality on 29 July 1999, through the collective effect of his parents' naturalization.

He moved to Lachine, Quebec at age six, later moving to Brossard, Quebec. His family then moved to Edmonton when he was 13. He began playing youth soccer with Edmonton Juventus before joining the FC Edmonton Academy in 2012. In 2016, he joined the Edmonton Green and Gold youth academy.

== University career ==
In 2016, he began attending the University of Alberta, where he played for the men's soccer team. In his first season, he was named a Canada West Second Team All-Star, winning the U Sports Men's Soccer Championship with the team. In 2017, he was named a Canada West First Team All-Star.

== Club career ==
Zebie joined FC Edmonton's senior side in the North American Soccer League on July 3, 2015 on a week-to-week contract. He made his first appearance on July 13 against the Fort Lauderdale Strikers, as a substitution for Michael Nonni.

After the NASL folded, Zebie played with the Calgary Foothills for the 2017 and 2018 Premier Development League seasons. The club would end up champions in 2018, capturing the PDL Championship in a 2-1 victory over Reading United in the final.

Zebie returned to FC Edmonton on December 13, 2018, ahead of the inaugural season of the Canadian Premier League. In November 2019, Edmonton announced Zebie would not be returning to the club for the 2020 season.

On February 5, 2020, Zebie signed with Alberta rival Cavalry FC, becoming the first player to play for both Al Classico rival clubs, reuniting with his former Calgary Foothills coach Tommy Wheeldon Jr. He appeared in all ten of Cavalry's matches that year. On January 26, 2021, the club announced it had declined Zebie's contract option for 2021 (due to league rules of having 4 international imports), making him a free agent. Following the season, he returned to his hometown of Edmonton to coach.

== International career ==
Zebie has been called up to camps for Canada at the under-18 and under-20 level. In 2013, he took part in the L'Alcúdia International Football Tournament as an under-18 Canada team finished fourth in the annual under-20 tournament.

== Coaching career ==
Zebie joined the coaching staff for his alma mater, the University of Alberta, in 2022.

== Personal life ==
Zebie's elder brother Allan was also a professional soccer player.

== Honours ==
University of Alberta Golden Bears

- U Sports Men's Soccer Championship: 2016

Calgary Foothills

- Premier Development League: 2018

Individual

- Canada West Second Team All-Star: 2016
- Canada West First Team All-Star: 2017
