= FC Edmonton =

Canadian professional soccer club

- Nickname: The Eddies
- Short name: FCE
- Founded: February 9, 2010; 16 years ago
- Dissolved: November 21, 2022; 4 years ago
- Stadium: Clarke Stadium; Edmonton, Alberta
- Capacity: 5,100
- Owner(s): Fath Sports Limited (The Fath Group)
- League: Canadian Premier League
- 2022: Canadian Premier League, 8th
- Website: fcedmonton.canpl.ca
Home colours	Away colours

FC Edmonton was a Canadian professional soccer club based in Edmonton, Alberta. The club was founded in 2010 and competed in the North American Soccer League (NASL) from 2011 to 2017 before going on hiatus in 2018 when the NASL ceased competitive operations and cancelled the season. They returned in 2019 to compete in the Canadian Premier League from the league's inaugural season, until 2022, when they were dissolved by the league. From 2012 onward, FC Edmonton's home field had been Clarke Stadium.

== History ==
=== Formative years ===
In February 2010, FC Edmonton was launched by brothers Tom and Dave Fath as founding members of the North American Soccer League. The club spent the first year playing exhibition matches against teams including Colo Colo, the Spokane Spiders and Vitória, with a squad of mostly by Albertan college students and amateur players. The team played an honorary match against the Canadian Armed Forces on Canada Day in July.

In December 2010, head coach Dwight Lodeweges and his assistant Hans Schrijver left the club before competing in a professional game to take a job in Japan. He was replaced by fellow Dutchman Harry Sinkgraven shortly after.

In January 2012, FC Edmonton started a male youth academy, and in September 2013 launched a female youth academy in partnership with the Alberta Soccer Association.

=== North American Soccer League (2011–2017) ===
On April 9, 2011, the team played its first competitive game and recorded a 2–1 victory against Fort Lauderdale Strikers. Alberta-native Shaun Saiko scored the first goal in the club's history. Edmonton finished their inaugural season in fifth out of eight teams and qualified for the 2011 NASL Playoffs quarterfinals, but were knocked out in a 5–0 defeat against the Fort Lauderdale Strikers.

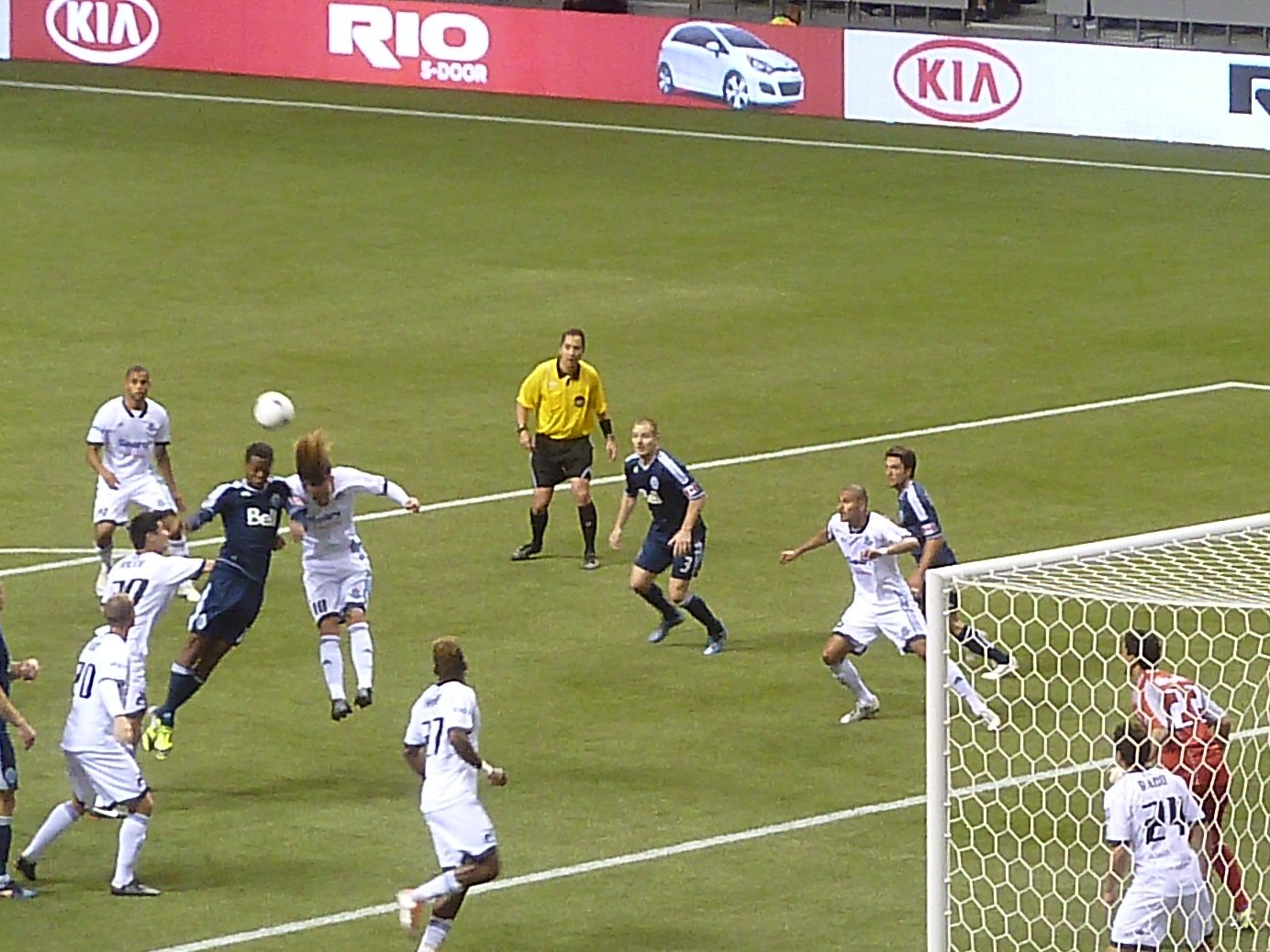
FC Edmonton plays against Vancouver Whitecaps FC during the 2012 Canadian Championship.

Schrijver returned to the club as assistant head coach for the 2012 season, but just five wins from 28 games finished the club at the bottom of the table. In September 2012, both Sinkgraven and Schrijver were released due to the bad results. On November 27, Colin Miller was named as the club's new head coach.

The club saw slight improvement during Miller's first year in charge, finishing fifth in the spring season before slipping to seventh in the fall season. However, the 2014 season saw considerable improvement for the club. After struggling at ninth in the spring season, Edmonton recorded their best ever league finish at third place during the fall season.

The 2015 season brought a similar scenario for the club. After a 10th-place finish in the spring season, the Eddies bounced back to finish fifth in the fall season, missing a playoff position by just four points. Edmonton improved further for the 2016 season, finishing third in both the spring and fall seasons. The club missed out on topping the spring season table by a single point after both Indy Eleven and the New York Cosmos recorded 18 points.

FC Edmonton returned to its former ways during the 2017 season and struggled to seventh-placed finishes in both the spring and fall seasons. On November 24, 2017, the club ceased professional operations citing the sustainability of the team and "continuous uncertainty being forced upon the NASL by the United States Soccer Federation". FC Edmonton continued to run their academies in hope of re-establishing the professional team at a later date.

=== Canadian Premier League and ownership struggles (2018–2022) ===
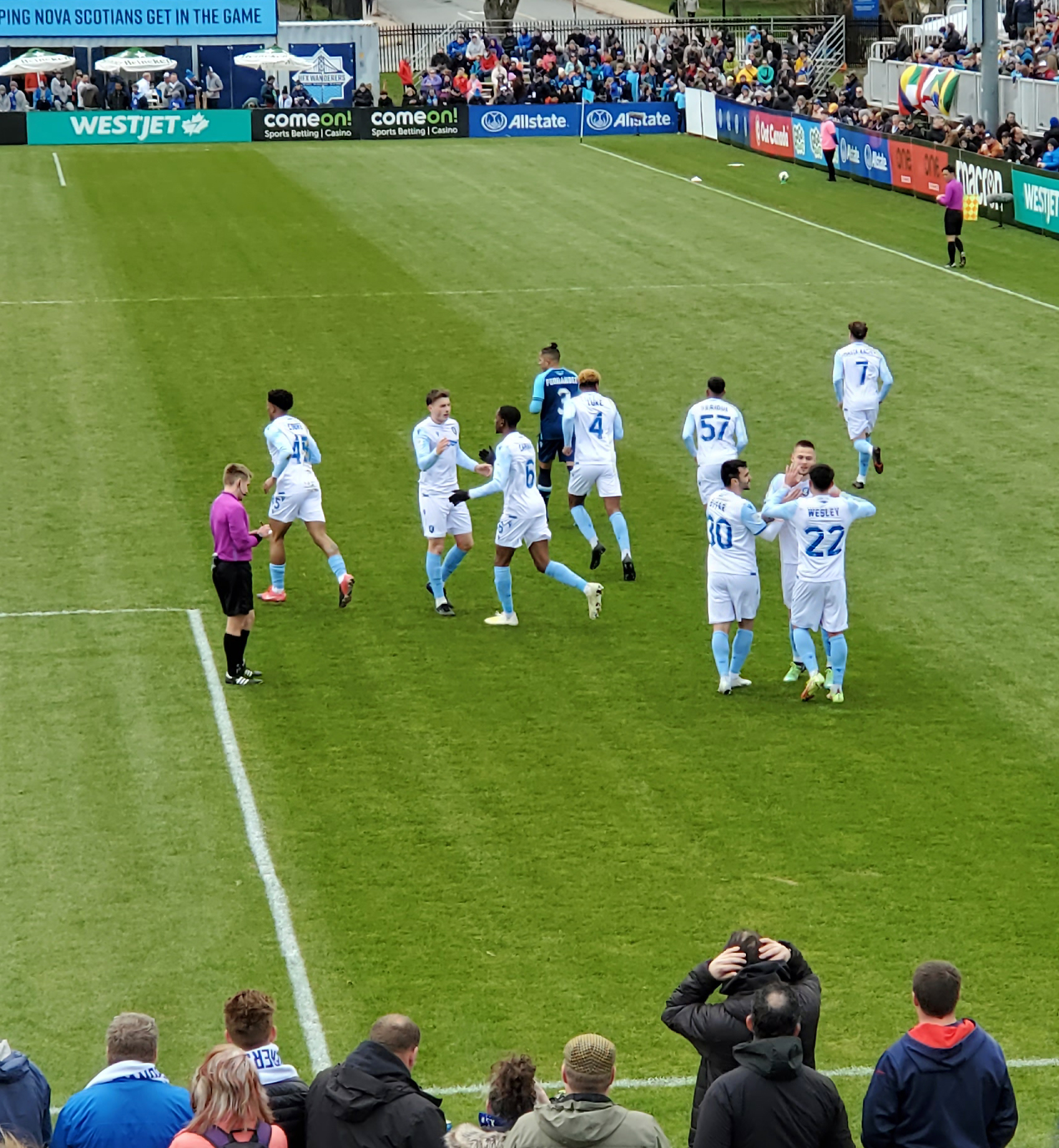
FC Edmonton celebrates a goal by Julian Ulbricht, their only goal in a 1–3 loss to HFX Wanderers FC on 30 April 2022 in Halifax.

On June 5, 2018, it was announced that the newly formed Canadian Premier League had approved the city of Edmonton for a professional club to compete in the league. Three days later, FC Edmonton announced their return to professional soccer. As well as confirming their place in the league for the 2019 season, the club revealed a new crest and branding. On July 3, the club named former assistant coach and academy technical director Jeff Paulus as the new head coach. The club finished fourth out of seven teams in the inaugural CPL season.

Following a last-place finish in the 2020 season, Jeff Paulus resigned as head coach and general manager. On November 2, 2020, Eric Newendorp was named club president and general manager.

FC Edmonton struggled again on the pitch in 2021 with new head coach Alan Koch, finishing seventh of eight and consistently drawing crowds of fewer than 1,000 people. On December 31, 2021, the league announced that it had taken over operations of the club from the Faths, with an aim to find a new ownership group.

On February 8, 2022, it was announced that club president Eric Newendorp had left the club and was replaced by former Edmonton Oilers executive Jeff Harrop. The majority of Edmonton's roster in 2022 were players on loan from other CPL clubs. The team finished the season in last place, recording just 4 wins in 28 matches. Following the season the CPL terminated the Fath Group's rights to operate the team in the CPL and said that the league will not operate a team in the Edmonton market for the 2023 season.

== Stadium ==
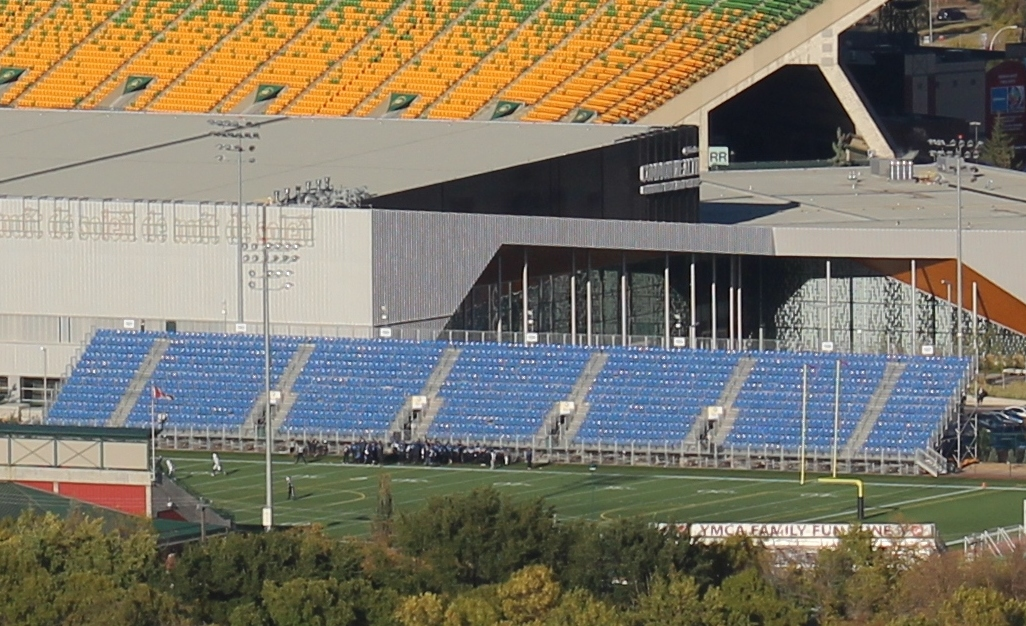
Clarke Stadium, with Commonwealth Stadium in the background. FC Edmonton play their home games at Clarke Field.

- Foote Field; Edmonton, Alberta (2011)
- Commonwealth Stadium, Edmonton, Alberta (2011–2013) three games (one per season) in Canadian Championship
- SMS Equipment Stadium, Fort McMurray, Alberta (2015) two games.
- Clarke Stadium; Edmonton, Alberta (2012–2017, 2019–2022)

The team began playing its home games at Foote Field, a 3,500-seater stadium viewed as the centrepiece of a multi-purpose sports facility on the University of Alberta campus. Initially built as a legacy facility for the 2001 World Championships, it was named after University of Alberta alumnus Eldon Foote, who donated $2 million towards the construction costs.

In 2012, he team moved into Clarke Stadium, the former home of the Edmonton Drillers, the Edmonton Brick Men, and the Edmonton Aviators. The club soon expanded the capacity from 1,200 to over 5,000 with temporary seat-back and bleacher seating and tried to find a permanent solution to bring the capacity up to 15,000.

Between 2011 and 2013, FC Edmonton played three games at Commonwealth Stadium, a much larger stadium with a capacity of 60,081. Two games were also played at SMS Equipment Stadium in 2015 as an opportunity to increase the club's exposure in Fort McMurray.

To meet the demands of the Canadian Premier League, FC Edmonton asked the City of Edmonton to help increase the capacity at Clarke Field to 7,000. The club cited that "the decision to join will bring in more fans as rivalries between national teams will be much stronger than the club experienced when it was in the North American Soccer League". In June 2018, FC Edmonton announced they would play at Clarke Stadium for the 2019 season, with seating capacity increased to 5,100.

== Crest and colours ==
Original crest used from 2010 to 2017

The club's original shield was quartered black and blue, fimbriated silver, and bordured white and silver, with a black and white soccer ball in the centre. A partial, stylized red maple leaf in the crest position, and a blue ribbon, bearing the club's name, was placed overall. The club adopted the shade of blue used by City of Edmonton, and the shape of the shield mirrored the municipal coat of arms.

The club relaunched with a new logo to compete in the Canadian Premier League. The shape of shield is unchanged, but the look is completely different. The field is dark blue, with a bend sinister in chief. The main charge is a stylized FCE, that includes representation of the North Saskatchewan River, and the letters double for the club's name and main beliefs, family, courage and energy. The FCE is ensigned by the words FC Edmonton, and 2010 for the year the club was founded, with a single rabbit's foot print in the base between the 20 and 10.

The official club colours are blue, navy and white (branded by the club as "prairie blue sky", "River City navy", and "white rabbit"). These colours symbolize the sky of the Canadian Prairies, the North Saskatchewan River and the Rally Rabbit.

=== Kit suppliers and sponsors ===
Period	Kit manufacturer	Chest sponsor
2013-2014	Adidas	None
2016	Adidas	The Faith Group
2017	Inaria	The Faith Group
2018	Macron	None
2019	Macron	OneSoccer
2020-2022	Macron	Swoop

== Club culture ==
=== Supporters ===
The FC Edmonton Supporters Group was formed in early 2010 by five members of The Voyageurs, a Canadian national team supporters group, in response to the announcement that an Edmonton team would compete in the North American Soccer League in 2011. The group aimed to bring a 'European-style' atmosphere to games in a similar manner to the Red Patch Boys in Toronto and the Vancouver Southsiders. The group folded in September 2018, with the creation of the River Valley Vanguard.

In December 2017, YEG for CPL was created as a group of passionate supporters hoping to persuade the club to join the Canadian Premier League. The group were recognized by owners Tom Fath and Dave Fath, and general manager Jay Ball, as part of the reason the club returned to professional soccer. At his official unveiling as head coach, Jeff Paulus praised the group saying "I'm grateful to the YEG for CPL members and all those who fought to save this club".

In September 2018, after the success of the YEG for CPL campaign, the River Valley Vanguard was created. The new supporters group is headquartered at 1st Round in Downtown Edmonton.

=== Mascot ===
The Rally Rabbit has been an important part of the club's culture since its inception in 2011. On June 26, the club faced the Montreal Impact at Foote Field before they left the North American Soccer League for Major League Soccer. Kyle Porter opened the scoring in the fifth minute but FC Edmonton looked likely to tire under the pressure of the Impact. In the later stages of the game, a rabbit made its way onto the pitch and sat in front of the Montreal goal. Home supporters cheered for the rabbit and the Edmonton players did not seem bothered, but the visiting team could not stop trying to chase the rabbit off the field. The team failed to regain their focus and FC Edmonton saw out the victory. The rabbit has since made several unscripted appearances and is always welcomed by cheers from the crowd, seen by supporters as a measure of good luck. The Rally Rabbit has also been known as Eddie Bunny or Eddie Jackalope.

=== Rivalries ===
During their time in the North American Soccer League, FC Edmonton's main rivalry was with Ottawa Fury, the only other Canadian team competing in the league when they joined in 2014. The meetings between the two sides were named "The Battle of Canada" and occurred in both the league and the Canadian Championship. The two teams met every year in the preliminary round over two legs, with the first ever meeting ending in a goalless draw on April 23, 2014. A week later, FC Edmonton won 3–1 in the home leg with two goals from Daryl Fordyce and one from Hanson Boakai. The first league derby between the two teams took place on May 31, with Ottawa Fury emerging as 1–0 victors after scoring a 90th-minute goal. The second meeting on July 13 saw a goalless draw as Ottawa Fury played with ten men for over 30 minutes, before FC Edmonton recorded their first league victory against the Fury with a 2–0 win on October 18.

In 2011, a friendly rivalry was formed over the course of the season between FC Edmonton and the NSC Minnesota Stars. In the aftermath of the 2011 Slave Lake wildfire in Alberta, a Minnesota supporters group raised money for affected families. This was reciprocated by an Edmonton supporters group who donated to the American Red Cross after a series of tornadoes which affected Minnesota. These events formed the rivalry between the teams, and the supporters groups created the Flyover Cup. The name was chosen because Edmonton and Minnesota lie in the flight paths of transcontinental flights, but are often passed over by tourists. The symbol of the cup is a loon, being an unofficial national bird of Canada and the state bird of Minnesota.

In 2018, the FC Edmonton Academy played provincial rivals the Calgary Foothills FC in two friendly games to help them prepare for their upcoming season. The fixtures were also used to gauge Edmonton's interest into a potential return to join the Canadian Premier League. The series was suggested by supporters groups from the two clubs and dubbed "Al Classico", inspired by the El Clásico rivalry between Real Madrid and Barcelona. The rivalry continued between FC Edmonton and Cavalry FC when the Canadian Premier League began in April 2019.

== Players and staff ==
=== Head coaches ===
Coach	From	To	Record (Note: Includes regular season, playoff, and Canadian Championship games.)				
Coach	From	To	G	W	D	L	Win %
(Netherlands) Dwight Lodeweges	March 9, 2010	December 3, 2010	0	0	0	0	—
(Netherlands) Harry Sinkgraven	December 7, 2010	September 28, 2012	60	15	16	29	25.00
(Canada) Colin Miller	November 27, 2012	November 24, 2017	162	52	43	67	32.10
(Canada) Jeff Paulus	July 3, 2018	September 21, 2020	37	9	9	19	24.32
(South Africa) Alan Koch	November 24, 2020	November 21, 2022	58	10	18	30	17.24

=== Captains ===
Years	Name	Nation
2011–2012	Chris Kooy	Canada
2013–2016	Albert Watson	Northern Ireland
2017	Nik Ledgerwood	Canada
2019–2020	Tomi Ameobi	England
2021	Ramon Soria	Spain
2022	Shamit Shome	Canada

== Broadcasting ==
When the club competed in the North American Soccer League, FC Edmonton matches were broadcast by a variety of distributors on various formats. Radio commentaries were broadcast on The Team 1260, the local sports radio station, from 2011 to 2013. In 2013, matches were televised on Sportsnet 360. Matches were also previously available to view free through the team's Ustream channel until the introduction of NASL Live, a paid-subscription service, which was subsequently abandoned.

In 2016 and 2017, Canadian viewers could stream matches for free at NASL.com while American viewers required subscriptions to various broadcasters including ESPN3, beIN Sports and the CBS Sports Network.

Under the Canadian Premier League's media rights, all matches are streamed on the subscription service OneSoccer.

== Seasons ==
The following list is inclusive of all competitive yearly records for the club.

8th	Wooden Spoon
n	Highest average attendance

Season	League												Playoffs	CC	Average attendance	Top goalscorer(s)	
Season	Div	League	Pld	W	D	L	GF	GA	GD	Pts	PPG	Pos.	Playoffs	CC	Average attendance	Name	Goals
2011	2	NASL	28	10	6	12	35	40	−5	36	1.29	5th	QF	SF	1,817	(Canada) Shaun Saiko	9
2012	2	NASL	28	5	10	13	26	36	–10	25	0.89	8th	DNQ	SF	1,492	(Canada) Shaun Saiko	7
2013	2	NASL	26	6	12	8	26	26	0	30	1.15	7th	DNQ	SF	2,437	(Northern Ireland) Daryl Fordyce	6
2014	2	NASL	27	10	7	10	34	29	+5	37	1.37	6th	DNQ	SF	3,384	(Northern Ireland) Daryl Fordyce	8
2015	2	NASL	30	9	8	13	41	46	−5	35	1.17	7th	DNQ	SF	3,122	(England) Tomi Ameobi	11
2016	2	NASL	32	15	8	9	25	21	+4	53	1.66	3rd	SF	PR	2,060	(Northern Ireland) Daryl Fordyce	7
2017	2	NASL	32	7	6	19	25	42	–17	27	0.84	7th	DNQ	PR	3,408	(El Salvador) Dustin Corea (England) Tomi Ameobi	6
2018	On hiatus																
2019	1	CPL	28	8	8	12	27	33	–6	32	1.14	4th	DNQ	R2	2,936	(Canada) Easton Ongaro	10
2020	1	CPL	7	0	1	6	5	14	–9	1	0.14	8th	DNQ	DNQ	N/A	(Canada) Easton Ongaro	3
2021	1	CPL	28	6	10	12	34	41	–7	28	1.00	7th	DNQ	PR	961	(Canada) Easton Ongaro	12
2022	1	CPL	28	4	8	16	31	51	−20	20	0.71	8th	DNQ	PR	1,071	(Germany) Tobias Warschewski	7
Total	–	–	294	80	84	130	309	379	–70	324	1.10	–	–	–	–	(Northern Ireland) Daryl Fordyce	34

1. Average attendance include statistics from league matches only.
2. Top goalscorer(s) includes all goals scored in league, league playoffs, Canadian Championship, CONCACAF League, and other competitive continental matches.

=== Top goalscorers ===
As of January 12, 2023

#	Pos.	Name	Nation	Career	League	Playoffs	CC	Total
1	Forward	Daryl Fordyce	Northern Ireland	2013–17	30	0	4	34
2	Forward	Tomi Ameobi	England	2014–17, 2019–2020	25	0	5	30
3	Forward	Easton Ongaro	Canada	2019–2021	25	0	0	25
4	Midfielder	Shaun Saiko	Canada	2011–13	18	0	0	18
5	Midfielder	Lance Laing	Jamaica	2013–15	16	0	1	17
6	Forward	Tobias Warschewski	Germany	2021–2022	11	0	1	12
6	Forward	Kyle Porter	Canada	2011–12	12	0	0	12
7	Forward	Michael Cox	Canada	2011–13	9	0	1	10
9	Midfielder	Dustin Corea	El Salvador	2015–17	7	0	1	8
9	Forward	Jake Keegan	United States	2016–17	7	0	1	8

=== Most appearances ===
As of January 12, 2023

#	Pos.	Name	Nation	Career	League	Playoffs	CC	Total
1	Forward	Tomi Ameobi	England	2014–17, 2019–2020	127	1	13	141
2	Defender	Albert Watson	Northern Ireland	2013–17	128	1	11	140
3	Forward	Daryl Fordyce	Northern Ireland	2013–17	110	1	12	123
4	Defender	Eddie Edward	Canada	2013–16	79	–	10	89
4	Defender	Allan Zebie	Canada	2015-17, 2019–2021	85	–	4	89
6	Midfielder	Lance Laing	Jamaica	2013–15	71	–	9	80
7	Midfielder	Sainey Nyassi	Gambia	2015–17	71	1	7	79
7	Midfielder	Shamit Shome	Canada	2016, 2021-2022	77	0	2	79
9	Defender	Antonio Rago	Canada	2011–13	68	1	4	73
10	Midfielder	Shaun Saiko	Canada	2011–13	65	1	5	71
10	Defender	Kareem Moses	Trinidad and Tobago	2014–15, 2019–2020	65	–	6	71

=== Single season club records ===
Record	Player	Stat	Season	League
Clean sheets	Matt Van Oekel	16	2016	North American Soccer League
Goals (all competitions)	Easton Ongaro	12	2021	Canadian Premier League
Goals (league matches)	Easton Ongaro	12	2021	Canadian Premier League
Appearances (all competitions)	Jake Keegan	34	2016	North American Soccer League

=== Individual awards ===
==== NASL Best XI ====
Season	Player	Position
2011	(Canada) Shaun Saiko	Midfielder
2012	(Canada) Paul Hamilton	Defender
2013	(Northern Ireland) Albert Watson	Defender
2014	(Jamaica) Lance Laing	Midfielder
2015	(Jamaica) Lance Laing	Midfielder
2016	(United States) Matt Van Oekel	Goalkeeper
2016	(Northern Ireland) Albert Watson	Defender

==== NASL Player of the Month ====
Season	Month	Player	Position
2012	May	(Canada) Shaun Saiko	Midfielder
2013	August	(Guyana) Chris Nurse	Midfielder
2016	May	(Senegal) Papé Diakité	Defender
2016	August	(United States) Matt Van Oekel	Goalkeeper

==== NASL Young Player of the Year ====
Season	Player	Position
2016	(Senegal) Papé Diakité	Defender

==== NASL Golden Glove ====
Season	Player
2014	(Canada) John Smits
2016	(United States) Matt Van Oekel

=== Supporters Awards ===
Year	Award	Player
2017	Supporters Player of the Season	Dustin Corea
2019	U21 Player of the Year	Easton Ongaro
2019	Player of the Season (spring)	Connor James
2019	Player of the Season (fall)	Easton Ongaro
2020	U21 Player of the Year	not awarded
2020	Player of the Season (spring)	not awarded
2020	Player of the Season (fall)	not awarded
2021	U21 Player of the Year	Darlington Murasiranwa
2021	Player of the Season	Easton Ongaro
2022	U21 Player of the Year	Darlington Murasiranwa
2022	Goal of the season	Tobias Warschewski
2022	Player of the Season	Shamit Shome
