= List of HFX Wanderers FC records and statistics =

This is a record of seasons played by HFX Wanderers FC in the Canadian Premier League (CPL) and other soccer competitions, from Halifax's inaugural CPL campaign in 2019 to the present day. It also includes club and individual honours and records for the team.

== Key ==
Key to competitions

- Canadian Premier League (CPL) – The top-flight of soccer in Canada, established in 2019.
- Canadian Championship (CC) – The premier knockout cup competition in Canadian soccer, first contested in 2008.
- CONCACAF Champions Cup (CCC) – The premier competition in North American soccer since 1962. It went by the name of Champions' Cup until 2008 and the Champions League until 2024.

Key to colors and symbols

1st or W	Champions/Winners
2nd or RU	Runners-up
Last	Wooden Spoon
♦	CPL Golden Boot
	Highest average attendance

Key to league record

- Season = The year and article of the season
- Div = Level on pyramid
- League = League name
- Pld = Played
- W = Games won
- L = Games lost
- D = Games drawn
- GF = Goals scored
- GA = Goals against
- Pts = Points
- PPG = Points per game
- Pos. = League position

Key to cup record

- DNE = Did not enter
- DNQ = Did not qualify
- NH = Competition not held or canceled
- QR = Qualifying round
- PR = Preliminary round
- GS = Group stage
- R1 = First round
- R2 = Second round
- R3 = Third round
- R4 = Fourth round
- R5 = Fifth round
- QF = Quarterfinals
- SF = Semifinals
- RU = Runners-up
- W = Winners

== Overview ==
Season	League												Playoffs	CC	Continental	Average attendance	Top goalscorer(s)	
Season	Div	League	Pld	W	D	L	GF	GA	GD	Pts	PPG	Pos.	Playoffs	CC	Continental	Average attendance	Name	Goals
2019	1	CPL	28	6	10	12	21	35	–14	28	1.00	7th	DNQ	R3	Ineligible	6,601	(Trinidad and Tobago) Akeem Garcia	7
2020	1	CPL	10	4	4	2	15	14	+1	16	1.60	–	RU	DNQ	DNQ	N/A	(Trinidad and Tobago) Akeem Garcia	6
2021	1	CPL	28	8	11	9	28	34	–6	35	1.25	6th	DNQ	QF	DNQ		(Brazil) João Morelli	15
2022	1	CPL	28	8	5	15	24	38	–14	29	1.04	7th	DNQ	QF	DNQ	5,825	(Canada) Samuel Salter	12
2023	1	CPL	28	11	9	8	39	32	+7	42	1.5	3rd	R1	PR	DNQ	5,854	(Canada) Massimo Ferrin	9

1. Average attendance include statistics from league matches only.
2. Top goalscorer(s) includes all goals scored in league season, league playoffs, Canadian Championship, CONCACAF League, and other competitive continental matches.

== Year-by-year statistics ==
	Canadian Premier League								CPL Playoffs								Canadian Championship								Continental							
Year	P	W	D	L	Pts	GF	GA	GD	P	W	D	L	Pts	GF	GA	GD	P	W	D	L	Pts	GF	GA	GD	P	W	D	L	Pts	GF	GA	GD
2019	28	6	10	12	28	21	35	–14	0	0	0	0	0	0	0	0	6	3	1	2	10	11	9	+2	0	0	0	0	0	0	0	0
2020	10	4	4	2	16	15	14	+1	1	0	0	1	0	0	2	–2	0	0	0	0	0	0	0	0	0	0	0	0	0	0	0	0
2021	28	8	11	9	35	28	34	-6	0	0	0	0	0	0	0	0	2	1	0	1	3	3	4	-1	0	0	0	0	0	0	0	0
2022	28	8	5	15	29	24	38	-14	0	0	0	0	0	0	0	0	2	1	0	1	3	3	2	+1	0	0	0	0	0	0	0	0
2023	28	11	9	8	42	39	32	+7	1	0	0	1	0	0	1	-1	1	0	0	1	0	1	3	-2	0	0	0	0	0	0	0	0
2024																																
Totals	38	10	14	14	44	36	49	–13	1	0	0	1	0	0	2	–2	6	3	1	2	10	11	9	+2	0	0	0	0	0	0	0	0

== Individual honours ==
- Golden Boot: Akeem Garcia (2020)
- Coach of the Year: Stephen Hart (2020)
- U21 Player of the Year nomination: Chrisnovic N'sa (2020)
- Goalkeeper of the Year nomination: Christian Oxner (2020)
- Golden Boot: João Morelli (2021)
- CPL Player of the Year: João Morelli (2021)
- Coach of the Year nomination: Patrice Gheisar (2023)
- Defender of the Year nomination: Daniel Nimick (2023)
- CPL Player of the Year nomination: Lorenzo Callegari (2023)

=== Wins ===
As of 23 June 2024

- Record win (all major competitions):
  - 0-4 vs Vancouver FC, 23 June 2024
  - 4-0 vs York United FC, 1 September 2025
- Record Canadian Premier League (CPL) win:
  - 0-4 vs Vancouver FC, 23 June 2024
  - 4-0 vs York United FC, 1 September 2025
- Record Canadian Championship win:
  - 2-0 vs Valour FC, 12 June 2019
  - 2-0 vs Guelph United F.C., 10 May 2022
- Record home win (CPL):
  - 4-0 vs York United FC, 1 September 2025
- Record home win (Canadian Championship):
  - 2-1 vs Valour FC, 5 June 2019
  - 2-1 vs A.S. Blainville, 17 August 2021
- Record away win (CPL):
  - 0-4 vs Vancouver FC, 23 June 2024
- Record away win (Canadian Championship):
  - 0-2 vs Valour FC, 12 June 2019
  - 0-2 vs Guelph United F.C., 10 May 2022

=== Losses and draws ===
As of 19 September 2023

- Record defeat (all major competitions):
  - 0-5 vs Pacific FC, 15 September 2020
- Record CPL defeat:
  - 0-5 vs Pacific FC, 15 September 2020
- Record Canadian Championship defeat:
  - 1-3 vs CF Montréal, 22 September 2021
  - 1-3 vs Atlético Ottawa, 19 April 2023
- Record home defeat (CPL):
  - 0-4 vs Forge FC, 20 May 2022
- Record home defeat (Canadian Championship):
  - 1-3 vs CF Montréal, 22 September 2021
- Record away defeat (CPL):
  - 2-6 vs York9, 27 July 2019
- Record away defeat (Canadian Championship):
  - 1-3 vs Atlético Ottawa, 19 April 2023 (Note: HFX Wanderers FC was considered the home team, but the match was played in a neutral venue (York Lions Stadium) due to both clubs being unable to host the match.)
- Highest scoring draw (all major competitions):
  - 3-3 vs York United, 6 September 2021

=== Attack ===
As of 23 June 2024

- Most goals scored in a CPL match:
  - 4 vs Vancouver FC, 23 June 2024
  - 4 vs Valour FC, 22 August 2025
  - 4 vs York United FC, 1 September 2025
- Most goals scored in a Canadian Championship match:
  - 3 vs Vaughan Azzurri, 15 May 2019
- Most goals scored in a Continental match: N/A

=== Defence ===
As of 20 September 2023

- Most goals conceded in a match (all major competitions):
  - 6 to York9, 27 July 2019
- Most goals conceded in a CPL match:
  - 6 to York9, 27 July 2019
- Most goals conceded in a Canadian Championship match:
  - 3 to Ottawa Fury FC, 10 July 2019
  - 3 to CF Montréal, 22 September 2021
  - 3 to Atlético Ottawa, 19 April 2023
- Most goals conceded in a Continental match: N/A
- Most goals conceded in a home match (all major competitions):
  - 4 to Forge FC, 20 May 2022
  - 4 to York United, 1 August 2022
- Most goals conceded in a CPL match at home:
  - 4 to Forge FC, 20 May 2022
  - 4 to York United, 1 August 2022
- Most goals conceded in a Canadian Championship match at home:
  - 3 to Ottawa Fury FC, 10 July 2019
  - 3 to CF Montréal, 22 September 2021
- Most goals conceded in an away match (all major competitions):
  - 6 to York9, 27 July 2019
- Most goals conceded in a CPL away match:
  - 6 to York9, 27 July 2019
- Most goals conceded in a Canadian Championship away match:
  - 3 to Atlético Ottawa, 19 April 2023
- Most clean sheets in a CPL season: 9, in the 2022 season

=== Firsts (all competitions) ===
As of 1 September 2025

- First player signed: 29 November 2018 ( (Canada) Zachary Sukunda)
- First club captain: (Trinidad and Tobago) Jan-Michael Williams
- First competitive match: 28 April 2019 (0-1 loss at Pacific FC in CPL)
- First competitive win: 4 May 2019 (2-1 win vs Forge FC) in CPL)
- First competitive clean sheet: 12 June 2019 (2-0 win vs Valour FC in Canadian Championship by Jan-Michael Williams)
- First competitive goal: 4 May 2019 by Akeem Garcia in the 30th minute vs Forge FC in CPL
- First competitive brace: 26 August 2020 by João Morelli against FC Edmonton
- First competitive hat-trick: 22 August 2025 by Tiago Coimbra vs Valour FC in CPL

=== Sequences ===
As of 20 September 2023

- Longest winning streak (all major competitions): 3 wins, 1–19 June 2019
- Longest winning streak (CPL): 2 wins (four different times)
- Longest losing streak (all major competitions): 6 losses, 10–31 July 2019
- Longest losing streak (CPL): 5 losses, 13–31 July 2019
- Longest unbeaten run (all major competitions): 10 matches, 22 August 2021 to 3 October 2021
- Longest unbeaten run (CPL): 10 matches, 22 August 2021 to 3 October 2021
- Longest unbeaten run at home (all major competitions): 7 matches, 5 August 2019 to 9 October 2019
- Longest unbeaten away run (all major competitions): 7 matches, 22 August 2021 to 17 October 2021
- Longest drawing streak (all major competitions): 6 draws, 2 September 2019 to 2 October 2019
- Longest drawing streak (CPL): 6 draws, 2 September 2019 to 2 October 2019
- Longest streak without a win (all major competitions): 13 matches, 16 September 2022 to 3 June 2023
- Longest streak without a win (CPL, over two seasons): 12 matches, 16 September 2022 to 3 June 2023
- Longest streak without a win (CPL, one season): 10 matches, 10 August 2019 to 9 October 2019
- Longest scoring run (all major competitions):
  - 11 matches, 9 October 2019 to 12 September 2020
  - 11 matches, 24 July 2021 to 11 September 2021
- Longest non-scoring run (all major competitions):
  - 5 matches, 15 September 2020 to 3 July 2021
- Most clean sheets in a row (all major competitions):
  - 3 matches, 11–23 October 2021 (Christian Oxner and Kieran Baskett)
  - 3 matches, 5–16 September 2022 (Kieran Baskett)
- Most consecutive minutes without conceding a goal (all major competitions):
  - 314 minutes, 6–26 October 2021 (224 minutes by Kieran Baskett and 90 minutes by Christian Oxner)

=== Attendance at Wanderer Grounds ===
As of 20 September 2023

- Highest reported attendance (all major competitions):
  - 6500 vs Toronto FC, 24 May 2022
  - 6500 vs Atlético Ottawa, 30 June 2022
- Highest reported attendance (CPL): 6500 vs Atlético Ottawa, 30 June 2022
- Highest reported attendance (Canadian Championship): 6500 vs Toronto FC, 24 May 2022
- Lowest reported attendance (all major competitions):
  - 3446 (attendance limited by provincial pandemic restrictions) vs York United, 6 September 2021
  - 3854 (when not limited by any restrictions) vs Valour FC, 6 May 2019
- Lowest reported attendance (CPL):
  - 3446 (attendance limited by provincial pandemic restrictions) vs York United, 6 September 2021
  - 4332 (when not limited by any pandemic restrictions) vs Pacific FC, 27 September 2022
- Lowest reported attendance (Canadian Championship):
  - 3780 (attendance limited by provincial pandemic restrictions) vs A.S. Blainville, 17 August 2021
  - 3854 (when not limited by any restrictions) vs Valour FC, 6 May 2019

=== International caps ===
As of March 30, 2022

This is a list of players who have gained full international caps during their time with Halifax Wanderers FC.

Player	Nation	Caps	Goals				
Player	Nation	Caps	Goals	Andre Rampersad	TRI	5	1
Jems Geffrard	HAI	3	0				
Abd-El-Aziz Yousef	SOM	2	0				
Akeem Garcia	TRI	2	0				
Alex Marshall	JAM	2	0				

== Individual records ==
=== Appearances ===
As of October 25, 2026

- **Youngest player** – (Canada) Adisa De Rosario, 17 years 11 months 13 days (vs. Forge FC, CPL, October 9, 2022)
- **Oldest player** – (Trinidad and Tobago) Jan-Michael Williams, 34 years 11 months 10 days (at Cavalry FC, CPL, October 5, 2019)

Rank	Name	Career	League	Playoffs	Canadian Championship	Continental	Total
1	(Trinidad and Tobago) **Andre Rampersad**	2019–	164	5	12	0	181
2	(France) **Lorenzo Callegari**	2023–	104	2	4	0	110
3	(Canada) Aidan Daniels	2022–2024	73	1	4	0	78
4	(Canada) Jérémy Gagnon-Laparé	2021–2022; 2024–2025	72	1	4	0	77
4	(Trinidad and Tobago) Akeem Garcia	2019–2022	66	3	8	0	77
4	(Canada) Wesley Timoteo	2022–2025	72	2	3	0	77
7	(Canada) Zachary Fernandez	2022–2024	71	1	4	0	76
8	(Germany) Peter Schaale	2019–2022	64	3	8	0	75
9	(Trinidad and Tobago) **Ryan Telfer**	2024–	69	1	3	0	73
10	(Canada) **Kareem Sow**	2021–2022; 2024–	66	1	2	0	69

Bold indicates player still active with club.

=== Goals ===
As of October 25, 2026

- **Most goals in a season** – (Brazil) João Morelli, 14 in 2021
- **Most goals in a match** – (Canada) Tiago Coimbra, 3 v Valour FC, Canadian Premier League, August 22, 2025)
- **Fastest goal in a match** – (Canada) Tomasz Skublak, 2nd minute (at Vaughan Azzurri, Canadian Championship, May 15, 2019)
- **Youngest goalscorer** – (Canada) Tiago Coimbra, 19 years 5 months 0 days (v Cavalry FC, Canadian Premier League, June 17, 2023)
- **Oldest goalscorer** – (Colombia) Luis Alberto Perea, 33 years 1 month 6 days (v Pacific FC, Canadian Premier League, October 9, 2019)

Rank	Name	Career	League	Playoffs	Canadian Championship	Continental	Total
1	(Brazil) João Morelli	2020–2023	22	1	1	0	24
2	(Trinidad and Tobago) Akeem Garcia	2019–2022	17	2	2	0	21
3	(Canada) Tiago Coimbra	2023–2025	19	1	0	0	20
4	(Canada) Massimo Ferrin	2023–2024	14	0	1	0	15
4	(Canada) Daniel Nimick	2023–2024	14	0	1	0	15
4	(Canada) Samuel Salter	2021–2022	14	0	1	0	15
7	(Canada) **Isaiah Johnston**	2025–	13	0	0	0	13
8	(Trinidad and Tobago) **Ryan Telfer**	2024–	8	0	1	0	9
9	(Republic of the Congo) **Jason Bahamboula**	2025–	7	0	0	0	7
10	(Canada) **Tavio Ciccarelli**	2024–	6	0	0	0	6
10	(Italy) Giorgio Probo	2024–2025	6	0	0	0	6

Bold indicates player still active with club.

=== Assists ===
As of October 25, 2026

- **Most assists in a season** – (France) Lorenzo Callegari, 6 in 2023

Rank	Name	Career	League	Playoffs	Canadian Championship	Continental	Total
1	(France) **Lorenzo Callegari**	2023–	15	0	0	0	15
2	(Canada) Wesley Timoteo	2022–2025	8	1	1	0	10
3	(Canada) Zachary Fernandez	2022–2024	7	0	0	0	7
3	(Canada) Jérémy Gagnon-Laparé	2021–2022 2024–2025	6	0	1	0	7
5	(Spain) **Miguel Arilla**	2026–	6	0	0	0	6
5	(Canada) Daniel Nimick	2023–2024	6	0	0	0	6
5	(Trinidad and Tobago) **Andre Rampersad**	2019–	6	0	0	0	6
8	(Canada) Tiago Coimbra	2023–2025	5	0	0	0	5
8	(Canada) Aidan Daniels	2022–2024	5	0	0	0	5
8	(Canada) Massimo Ferrin	2023–2024	5	0	0	0	5
8	(Canada) **Isaiah Johnston**	2025–	5	0	0	0	5
8	(Italy) Giorgio Probo	2024–2025	5	0	0	0	5
8	(Canada) Sean Rea	2024–2025	4	1	0	0	5
8	(Trinidad and Tobago) **Ryan Telfer**	2024–	5	0	0	0	5

Bold indicates player still active with club.

=== Clean sheets ===
As of October 25, 2026

- **Most clean sheets in a season** – (Algeria) Rayane Yesli, 8 in 2025
- **Youngest keeper to record a clean sheet** – (Canada) Kieran Baskett, 19 years 11 months 22 days (vs. York United FC, CPL, September 18, 2021)
- **Oldest keeper to record a clean sheet** – (Trinidad and Tobago) Jan-Michael Williams, 34 years 8 months 11 days (vs. York 9 FC, CPL, July 6, 2019)

Rank	Name	Career	League	Playoffs	Canadian Championship	Continental	Total
1	(Canada) Christian Oxner	2019–2022	17	0	1	0	18
2	(Canada) Yann Fillion	2023–2024	11	0	0	0	11
3	(Canada) Kieran Baskett	2021–2022	9	0	0	0	9
4	(Algeria) Rayane Yesli	2025	8	0	0	0	8
5	(Canada) **Marco Carducci**	2026–	5	0	0	0	5
6	(Trinidad and Tobago) Jan-Michael Williams	2019	2	0	1	0	3
7	(Canada) Aiden Rushenas	2022–2025	1	0	0	0	1
