= 2019 HFX Wanderers FC season =

HFX Wanderers
2019 season
- President: Derek Martin
- Head coach: Stephen Hart
- Stadium: Wanderers Grounds
- Canadian Premier League: Spring: 4th Fall: 7th Overall: 7th
- Canadian Championship: Third qualifying round
- Top goalscorer: League: Akeem Garcia (7 goals); All: Akeem Garcia (8 goals)
- Highest home attendance: 6,244 (June 1 vs. Pacific FC)
- Lowest home attendance: 3,854 (June 5 vs. Valour FC)
- Average home league attendance: League: 6,055; All: 5,904
- Biggest win: 2–0 (June 26 vs. Valour FC) and two other occasions
- Biggest defeat: 2–6 (July 27 vs. York 9 FC)
Home colours	Away colours

The 2019 HFX Wanderers FC season was the first season in the club's history having been founded on 5 May 2018, as well as the first season in Canadian Premier League (CPL) history. Stephen Hart was the club's first manager, with the team playing at Wanderers Grounds. The season covers the period from 1 November 2018 through to 31 October 2019. Hart, like his peers in the CPL, built a squad from the ground up, and made use of all available mechanisms for player recruitment: the CPL Open Trials, the U-Sports Draft, and benefiting from his domestic and international connections, particularly from his native Trinidad & Tobago.

== Overview ==
The first ever player signed by the team was Canadian defender Zachary Sukunda on 29 November 2018, followed by a quartet of Trinidad & Tobago players in the new year. A contingent of Canadians followed before Hart turned his attention to signing three players from the CPL Open Trials: Kouamé Ouattara, Kodai Iida, and Mohamed Kourouma. Hart also signed all three U-Sports draft picks, and added some veteran attacking options in Luis Alberto Perea and Juan Diego Gutierrez. As the season approached and during the season, Hart raided League 1 Ontario club Vaughan Azzurri three times to round out his squad, signing Tomasz Skublak, Matthew Arnone and eventually, Duran Lee.

A short pre-season in April in the Dominican Republic saw HFX play only two matches, before playing its first ever competitive fixture on 28 April 2019, away at Pacific FC and losing 1–0. Following the defeat, HFX returned home to a raucous Wanderers Grounds on 4 May 2019, picking up its first win in history, defeating eventual champions Forge FC 2–1 with forward Akeem Garcia, scoring the team's first ever goal in the 30th minute. HFX would finish the Spring Season a respectable fourth place. In the Canadian Championship, HFX dispatched Vaughan Azzurri and Valour FC.

The Fall Season began optimistically on 6 July 2019 with the team recording a 1–0 win over York 9 FC and preparing to face Ottawa Fury FC of the United Soccer League Championship in the third preliminary round of the Canadian Championship. However, a congested fixture schedule would take its toll on the team, playing seven matches in eighteen days in July. HFX would lose all of them, bar one draw away to the afore-mentioned Ottawa Fury FC, which was insufficient to progress in the Canadian Championship. Throughout the year, HFX had had difficulty mustering much offense, which contributed to the slump. Improved defensive performances in September resulted in an uptick of form, but without much goalscoring, HFX could only muster six consecutive draws (a league record), surrendering the lead late on a number of occasions along the way. Combined with suggestions of locker room discord and Hart commenting on his players learning what it meant to be a professional, the Fall Season was difficult for HFX, finishing last which also “earned” the team the proverbial wooden spoon for 2019 as a whole. However, the year would end on a positive note, with Hart and company earning their first and only away win, 2–0 against York 9 FC. The Privateers 1882's supporter's group player of the year award went to centre-back, Matthew Arnone.

Off the pitch, the club maintained high attendance rates, with matches at the Wanderers Grounds frequently reaching capacity. This support created a significant home-field advantage; during the league season, Cavalry FC was the only team to ever win at Wanderers Grounds. The atmosphere at the stadium received national attention, including comments from then-Toronto FC captain Michael Bradley who expressed a desire to play at the grounds during the Canadian Championship.

A last place finish, however, was always going to mean high player turnover. Instead of announcing a list of players released at the end of the season, the club instead would announce returning players only over the course of the off-season.

== Squad ==
As of October 19, 2019

No.	Player	Nationality	Position(s)	Date of birth (age)	Previous club
Goalkeepers
21	Jan-Michael Williams	(Trinidad and Tobago)	GK	October 26, 1984 (aged 35)	(Guatemala) Sacachispas
50	Christian Oxner	(Canada)	GK	July 29, 1996 (aged 23)	(Canada) Saint Mary's Huskies
Defenders
3	André Bona	(France)	RB / CB	January 19, 1990 (aged 29)	(Canada) UQAM Citadins
4	Chakib Hocine	(Algeria)	CB	August 8, 1991 (aged 28)	(Finland) Ekenäs
6	Chrisnovic N'sa	(Canada)	CB / CM	January 28, 1999 (aged 20)	(Canada) Montreal Impact Academy
16	Duran Lee	(Canada)	CB	May 9, 1995 (aged 24)	(Canada) Vaughan Azzurri
20	Ndzemdzela Langwa	(Canada)	LB	March 5, 1998 (aged 21)	(Spain) Socuéllamos
23	Matthew Arnone	(Canada)	CB	February 28, 1994 (aged 25)	(Canada) Vaughan Azzurri
24	Alex De Carolis	(Canada)	LB / CB	September 24, 1992 (aged 27)	(Sweden) Umeå FC
25	Zachary Sukunda	(Canada)	RB	June 24, 1995 (aged 24)	(Australia) Northcote City
Midfielders
5	Elton John	(Trinidad and Tobago)	CM / CB	April 8, 1987 (aged 32)	(Trinidad and Tobago) San Juan Jabloteh
7	Juan Gutiérrez	(Peru)	LW / RW / AM	April 28, 1992 (aged 27)	(Peru) Sport Rosario
8	Elliot Simmons	(Canada)	CM	February 5, 1998 (aged 21)	(Sweden) Dalkurd
9	Kodai Iida	(Japan)	AM	December 6, 1994 (aged 25)	(United States) Washington Premier FC
12	Mohamed Kourouma	(Guinea)	LW	August 4, 1990 (aged 29)	(United States) Miami City
13	Kouamé Ouattara	(Ivory Coast)	CM	August 6, 1991 (aged 28)	(Canada) CS Dieppe
15	Scott Firth	(Canada)	CM	March 2, 2001 (aged 18)	(Canada) Suburban FC
18	Andre Rampersad	(Trinidad and Tobago)	CM	February 2, 1995 (aged 24)	(Trinidad and Tobago) Santa Rosa
22	Abd-El-Aziz Yousef	(Somalia)	RW / AM	October 5, 1999 (aged 20)	(Netherlands) Cambuur
Forwards
10	Luis Perea	(Colombia)	ST	September 3, 1986 (aged 33)	(Colombia) La Equidad
11	Akeem Garcia	(Trinidad and Tobago)	CF / RW	September 11, 1996 (aged 23)	(Trinidad and Tobago) Santa Rosa
14	Vincent Lamy	(Canada)	CF	July 10, 1999 (aged 20)	(Canada) Montreal Impact Academy
17	Tomasz Skublak	(Canada)	ST	December 8, 1997 (aged 22)	(Canada) Vaughan Azzurri

== Transfers ==
=== In ===
No.	Pos.	Player	Transferred from	Fee/notes	Date	Source
25	DF	(Canada) Zachary Sukunda	(Australia) Northcote City	Free Transfer	November 29, 2018	
21	GK	(Trinidad and Tobago) Jan-Michael Williams	(Guatemala) Sacachispas	Free Transfer	January 10, 2019	
5	DF	(Trinidad and Tobago) Elton John	(Trinidad and Tobago) Queen's Park CC	Free Transfer	January 10, 2019	
18	MF	(Trinidad and Tobago) Andre Rampersad	(Trinidad and Tobago) FC Santa Rosa	Free Transfer	January 10, 2019	
11	FW	(Trinidad and Tobago) Akeem Garcia	(Trinidad and Tobago) FC Santa Rosa	Free Transfer	January 10, 2019	
4	DF	(Algeria) Chakib Hocine	(Finland) Ekenäs	Free Transfer	January 16, 2019	
14	FW	(Canada) Vincent Lamy	(Canada) Montreal Impact Academy	Free Transfer	January 22, 2019	
8	MF	(Canada) Elliot Simmons	(Sweden) Dalkurd	Free Transfer	January 22, 2019	
15	MF	(Canada) Scott Firth	(Canada) Suburban FC	Free Transfer	January 30, 2019	
20	DF	(Canada) Ndzemdzela Langwa	(Spain) Socuéllamos	Free Transfer	February 5, 2019	
6	DF	(Canada) Chrisnovic N'sa	(Canada) Montreal Impact Academy	Free Transfer	February 5, 2019	
50	GK	(Canada) Christian Oxner	(Canada) Saint Mary's Huskies	Selected 19th overall in the 2018 CPL–U Sports Draft	February 20, 2019	
24	DF	(Canada) Alex De Carolis	(Sweden) Umeå FC	Free Transfer	February 20, 2019	
13	MF	(Ivory Coast) Kouamé Ouattara	(Canada) CS Dieppe	Free Transfer	February 21, 2019	
9	MF	(Japan) Kodai Iida	(United States) Washington Premier FC	Free Transfer	February 21, 2019	
10	FW	(Colombia) Luis Alberto Perea	(Colombia) La Equidad	Free Transfer	February 25, 2019	
7	MF	(Peru) Juan Diego Gutiérrez	(Peru) Sport Rosario	Free Transfer	February 25, 2019	
2	DF	(Germany) Peter Schaale	(Canada) CBU Capers	Selected 5th overall in the 2018 CPL–U Sports Draft	March 29, 2019	
3	DF	(France) André Bona	(Canada) UQAM Citadins	Selected 10th overall in the 2018 CPL–U Sports Draft	March 29, 2019	
12	MF	(Guinea) Mohamed Kourouma	(United States) FC Miami City	Free Transfer	April 4, 2019	
22	MF	(Somalia) Abd-El-Aziz Yousef	(Netherlands) SC Cambuur	Free Transfer	April 4, 2019	
17	FW	(Canada) Tomasz Skublak	(Canada) Vaughan Azzurri	Free Transfer	April 9, 2019	
23	DF	(Canada) Matthew Arnone	(Canada) Vaughan Azzurri	Free Transfer	May 1, 2019	
16	DF	(Canada) Duran Lee	(Canada) Vaughan Azzurri	Free Transfer	August 13, 2019	

==== Draft picks ====
HFX Wanderers selected the following players in the 2018 CPL–U Sports Draft on November 12, 2018. Draft picks are not automatically signed to the team roster. Only those who are signed to a contract will be listed as transfers in.

Round	Selection	Pos.	Player	Nationality	University
1	5	DF	Peter Schaale	Germany	CBU Capers
2	10	DF	André Bona	France	UQAM Citadins
3	19	GK	Christian Oxner	Canada	Saint Mary's Huskies

=== Out ===
No.	Pos.	Player	Transferred to	Fee/notes	Date	Source
2	DF	(Germany) Peter Schaale	(Canada) CBU Capers	Developmental Contract expired	August 15, 2019	

== Competitions ==
Match times are Atlantic Daylight Time (UTC−3).

=== Preseason ===
April 12	Inter RD	0–1	HFX Wanderers FC	Punta Cana, Dominican Republic
		Report	Lamy

April 14	FC Edmonton	0–1	HFX Wanderers FC	Punta Cana, Dominican Republic
		Report	Garcia

=== Canadian Premier League ===
==== Spring season ====
===== League table =====
Pos	Team	Pld	W	D	L	GF	GA	GD	Pts	Qualification
1	Cavalry	10	8	0	2	16	7	+9	24	2019 Canadian Premier League Finals
2	Forge	10	6	1	3	15	7	+8	19	2019 CONCACAF League preliminary round (Note: As winner of home and away matches between FC Edmonton, Forge FC, and Valour FC)
3	FC Edmonton	10	4	2	4	8	9	−1	14	
4	HFX Wanderers	10	3	2	5	8	11	−3	11	
5	Pacific	10	3	2	5	11	15	−4	11	
6	York9	10	2	5	3	9	11	−2	11	
7	Valour	10	3	0	7	8	15	−7	9	

Source: CanPL.ca
Rules for classification: 1) points; 2) total wins; 3) goal differential; 4) goals for; 5) away goal differential; 6) away goals for; 7) home goal differential; 8) home goals for; 9) coin toss or drawing of lots.

===== Results summary =====
Overall								Home						Away					
Pld	W	D	L	GF	GA	GD	Pts	W	D	L	GF	GA	GD	W	D	L	GF	GA	GD
10	3	2	5	8	11	−3	11	3	1	1	8	5	+3	0	1	4	0	6	−6

Last updated: July 1, 2019.
Source: canpl.ca

===== Results by match =====
Match	1	2	3	4	5	6	7	8	9	10
Ground	A	H	A	A	H	H	H	A	H	A
Result	L	W	L	L	D	W	L	D	W	L
Position	7	5	5	6	6	3	4	4	3	4

Updated to match(es) played on July 1, 2019. Source: #Matches
A = Away; H = Home; W = Win; D = Draw; L = Loss

===== Matches =====
April 28 1	Pacific FC	1–0	HFX Wanderers FC	Langford, British Columbia
8:00 pm	Starostzik 23'; MacNaughton (yellow card) 45+1' (yellow-red card) 72'; Baldisimo (yellow card) 69'	Report		Stadium: Westhills Stadium; Attendance: 5,100; Referee: Alain Ruch

May 4 2	HFX Wanderers FC	2–1	Forge FC	Halifax, Nova Scotia
2:00 pm	Garcia 30'; Langwa (yellow card) 38'; Bona (yellow card) 42'; N'sa (yellow card) 70'; Perea 82', (yellow card) 90+4'; Williams (yellow card) 90+2'	Report	Thomas 57'; Samuel (yellow card) 90+4'	Stadium: Wanderers Grounds; Attendance: 6,113; Referee: Marie-Soleil Beaudoin

May 11 3	Valour FC	1–0	HFX Wanderers FC	Winnipeg, Manitoba
4:30 pm	Ferguson 48'; Garcia (yellow card) 80'; Janssens (yellow card) 86'	Report	Bona (yellow card) 88'	Stadium: IG Field; Attendance: 5,819; Referee: David Barrie

May 25 4	Cavalry FC	2–0	HFX Wanderers FC	Foothills County, Alberta
7:30 pm	Malonga 21', 56'; Pasquotti (yellow card) 53'	Report	Gutiérrez (yellow card) 76'	Stadium: ATCO Field; Attendance: 3,162; Referee: David Barrie

May 29 5	HFX Wanderers FC	1–1	York9 FC	Halifax, Nova Scotia
7:00 pm	Arnone (yellow card) 4'; Schaale 15'; Langwa (yellow card) 24'; Simmons (yellow card) 39'	Report	Gattas 5' (pen.); Estevez (yellow card) 21'; Porter (yellow card) 26'; Gogarty (yellow card) 52'	Stadium: Wanderers Grounds; Attendance: 5,387; Referee: Fabrizio Stasolla

June 1 6	HFX Wanderers FC	2–1	Pacific FC	Halifax, Nova Scotia
3:00 pm	Garcia 51'; Perea 68' (pen.)	Report	Campbell 42'; McCurdy (yellow card) 66'	Stadium: Wanderers Grounds; Attendance: 6,244; Referee: Pierre-Luc Lauzière

June 19 7	HFX Wanderers FC	1–2	Cavalry FC	Halifax, Nova Scotia
7:00 pm	Iida (yellow card) 26'; Arnone (yellow card) 39'; Andre Rampersad 50' (yellow card) 71'	Report	Waterman (yellow card) 36'; Camargo 39'; Bona 41' (o.g.); Wheeldon (yellow card) 57'; Büscher (yellow card) 80'	Stadium: Wanderers Grounds; Attendance: 6,021; Referee: Yusri Rudolf

June 22 8	York9 FC	0–0	HFX Wanderers FC	Toronto, Ontario
4:30 pm	Murofushi (yellow card) 22'	Report	Bona (yellow card) 15'; N'sa (yellow card) 90+2'	Stadium: York Lions Stadium; Attendance: 2,101; Referee: Fabrizio Stasolla

June 26 9	HFX Wanderers FC	2–0	Valour FC	Halifax, Nova Scotia
7:00 pm	Kourouma 44' (pen.); Skublak (yellow card) 65'; Schaale (yellow card) 84'; Garcia 85' (yellow card) 90+5'	Report	Ohin (yellow card) 65'	Stadium: Wanderers Grounds; Attendance: 5,834; Referee: David Barrie

July 1 10	FC Edmonton	2–0	HFX Wanderers FC	Edmonton, Alberta
4:30 pm	Velado-Tsegaye 36'; Diouck 84'	Report		Stadium: Clarke Stadium; Attendance: 3,012; Referee: Filip Dujic

==== Fall season ====
===== League table =====
Pos	Team	Pld	W	D	L	GF	GA	GD	Pts	Qualification
1	Cavalry	18	11	5	2	35	12	+23	38	2019 Canadian Premier League Finals
2	Forge	18	11	4	3	30	19	+11	37	
3	York9	18	7	2	9	30	26	+4	23	
4	Pacific	18	5	5	8	24	31	−7	20	
5	Valour	18	5	4	9	22	37	−15	19	
6	FC Edmonton	18	4	6	8	19	24	−5	18	
7	HFX Wanderers	18	3	8	7	13	24	−11	17	

Source: CanPL.ca
Rules for classification: 1) points; 2) total wins; 3) goal differential; 4) goals for; 5) away goal differential; 6) away goals for; 7) home goal differential; 8) home goals for; 9) coin toss or drawing of lots.

===== Results summary =====
Overall								Home						Away					
Pld	W	D	L	GF	GA	GD	Pts	W	D	L	GF	GA	GD	W	D	L	GF	GA	GD
18	3	8	7	13	24	−11	17	2	6	1	5	4	+1	1	2	6	8	20	−12

Last updated: October 19, 2019.
Source: canpl.ca

===== Results by match =====
Match	1	2	3	4	5	6	7	8	9	10	11	12	13	14	15	16	17	18
Ground	H	H	A	A	A	A	H	H	A	H	A	H	H	H	A	A	H	A
Result	W	L	L	L	L	L	W	D	L	D	D	D	D	D	D	L	L	W
Position	3	5	5	6	6	7	5	5	7	7	7	7	7	7	7	7	7	7

Updated to match(es) played on October 19, 2019. Source: #Matches
A = Away; H = Home; W = Win; D = Draw; L = Loss

===== Matches =====
July 6 1	HFX Wanderers FC	1–0	York9 FC	Halifax, Nova Scotia
4:30 pm	Garcia 55'	Report	Abzi (yellow card) 84'	Stadium: Wanderers Grounds; Attendance: 6,244; Referee: Juan Marquez

July 13 2	HFX Wanderers FC	0–1	Cavalry FC	Halifax, Nova Scotia
4:30 pm	Gutiérrez (yellow card) 59'; Bona (yellow card) 88'	Report	Oliver 85'	Stadium: Wanderers Grounds; Attendance: 6,177; Referee: Filip Dujic

July 17 3	Forge FC	2–0	HFX Wanderers FC	Hamilton, Ontario
8:00 pm	Bekker 36'; Borges 40' (yellow card) 89'; Henry (yellow card) 86'	Report	Garcia (yellow card) 32'	Stadium: Tim Hortons Field; Attendance: 5,631; Referee: David Barrie

July 20 4	Pacific FC	3–1	HFX Wanderers FC	Langford, British Columbia
7:00 pm	Blasco 9'; Verhoven (yellow card) 26'; Campbell 61', 90+1'	Report	Schaale (yellow card) 8'; Arnone 15' (yellow card) 90+5'; John (yellow card) 54'	Stadium: Westhills Stadium; Attendance: 2,737; Referee: Yusri Rudolf

July 27 5	York9 FC	6–2	HFX Wanderers FC	Toronto, Ontario
4:30 pm	Telfer 11', 63'; Gattas 22', 31', 45'; Aparicio (yellow card) 40'; Gasparotto (yellow card) 45+4'; Estevez 85'	Report	N'sa (yellow card) 19'; Perea (yellow card) 45+4'; Bona (yellow card) 53'; Skublak 60'; De Carolis (yellow card) 68'; Rampersad (yellow card) 69'; Thompson 75' (o.g.)	Stadium: York Lions Stadium; Attendance: 3,154; Referee: Pierre-Luc Lauzière

July 31 6	FC Edmonton	2–0	HFX Wanderers FC	Edmonton, Alberta
10:00 pm	Diouck (yellow card) 19'; Ongaro 21'; Ameobi 47' (pen.)	Report	Rampersad (yellow card) 34'; Hocine (yellow card) 74'; Bona (yellow card) 87'	Stadium: Clarke Stadium; Attendance: 2,873; Referee: Juan Marquez

August 5 7	HFX Wanderers FC	1–0	Valour FC	Halifax, Nova Scotia
4:30 pm	Skublak (yellow card) 41'; Arnone 58'	Report	Arguiñarena (yellow card) 82'; Murrell (red card) 90'; Gutiérrez (yellow card) 90+2'	Stadium: Wanderers Grounds; Attendance: 6,115; Referee: Filip Dujic

August 10 8	HFX Wanderers FC	0–0	Cavalry FC	Halifax, Nova Scotia
2:00 pm	Simmons (yellow card) 27'; Oxner (yellow card) 60'	Report	Wheeldon (yellow card) 38'; Trafford (yellow card) 47'	Stadium: Wanderers Grounds; Attendance: 6,204; Referee: Marie-Soleil Beaudoin

August 28 9	Valour FC	2–0	HFX Wanderers FC	Winnipeg, Manitoba
9:00 pm	Mitter (yellow card) 45+1'; Bustos 47', 50' (yellow card) 77'	Report	Ouattara (yellow card) 28'	Stadium: IG Field; Attendance: 4,346; Referee: Yusri Rudolf

September 2 10	HFX Wanderers FC	0–0	FC Edmonton	Halifax, Nova Scotia
2:00 pm	Gutiérrez (yellow card) 11'; De Carolis (yellow card) 25'	Report	Diouck (yellow card) 13'	Stadium: Wanderers Grounds; Attendance: 6,200; Referee: Mathieu Souaré

September 15 11	Forge FC	2–2	HFX Wanderers FC	Hamilton, Ontario
2:00 pm	Awuah (yellow card) 55'; Nanco 69'; Borges 81'	Report	Garcia 48'; Gutiérrez 58'; Langwa (yellow card) 79'	Stadium: Tim Hortons Field; Attendance: 6,016; Referee: Fabrizio Stasolla

September 18 12	HFX Wanderers FC	1–1	Forge FC	Halifax, Nova Scotia
6:30 pm	Garcia 43'; Tomasz Skublak (yellow card) 90+4'	Report	Edgar (yellow card) 53' (goal) 90+3'	Stadium: Wanderers Grounds; Attendance: 5,824; Referee: Myriam Marcotte
Note: Originally scheduled for August 21, 5:00 pm

September 21 13	HFX Wanderers FC	0–0	Valour FC	Halifax, Nova Scotia
2:00 pm	Rampersad (yellow card) 71'	Report	Ohin (yellow card) 44'; Murrell (yellow card) 90+1'	Stadium: Wanderers Grounds; Attendance: 6,138; Referee: Yusri Rudolf

September 28 14	HFX Wanderers FC	1–1	FC Edmonton	Halifax, Nova Scotia
2:00 pm	Didic 6' (o.g.); John (yellow card) 18'	Report	Temguia (yellow card) 69'; Ameobi 80'	Stadium: Wanderers Grounds; Attendance: 6,213; Referee: Juan Marquez

October 2 15	Pacific FC	1–1	HFX Wanderers FC	Langford, British Columbia
11:00 pm	Blasco 31'; Starostzik (yellow card) 44'; Hojabrpour (yellow card) 57'	Report	N'sa (yellow card) 51'; Garcia 80'; Lee (yellow card) 90'	Stadium: Westhills Stadium; Attendance: 2,708; Referee: David Gantar

October 5 16	Cavalry FC	2–0	HFX Wanderers FC	Foothills County, Alberta
7:00 pm	Adekugbe 71'; Büscher (yellow card) 83'; Waterman 90+1'	Report	Skublak (yellow card) 44'; Williams (red card) 83'; N'sa (yellow card) 90+4'	Stadium: ATCO Field; Attendance: 3,295; Referee: Yusri Rudolf

October 9 17	HFX Wanderers FC	1–1	Pacific FC	Halifax, Nova Scotia
7:00 pm	Perea 27' (pen.); John (yellow card) 41'; Oxner (yellow card) 70'	Report	MacNaughton 13' (yellow card) 81'; González (yellow card) 36'	Stadium: Wanderers Grounds; Attendance: 6,055; Referee: Marie-Soleil Beaudoin

October 19 18	York9 FC	0–2	HFX Wanderers FC	Toronto, Ontario
2:30 pm	Doner (yellow card) 35'; Murofushi (yellow card) 76'	Report	Gutiérrez 27'; Iida 33'; Bona (yellow card) 64'	Stadium: York Lions Stadium; Attendance: 3,452; Referee: Ben Hoskins

=== Canadian Championship ===
==== First qualifying round ====
May 15 Leg 1	Vaughan Azzurri	2–3	HFX Wanderers FC	Vaughan, Ontario
8:00 pm	Johnston (yellow card) 45'; Whiteman 51'; Raposo 60'; Velastegui (yellow card) 90+2'	Report	Skublak 2'; Simmons (yellow card) 19'; Garcia 39'; Kourouma 90+3' (pen.)	Stadium: Ontario Soccer Centre; Attendance: 1,200; Referee: Serge Topalian

May 22 Leg 2	HFX Wanderers FC	0–1 (3a–3 agg.)	Vaughan Azzurri	Halifax, Nova Scotia
6:00 pm	Rampersad (yellow card) 33'; Iida (yellow card) 39'; Gutiérrez (yellow card) 53'; Skublak (yellow card) 90+1'	Report	Schaale 27' (o.g.); Fathazada (yellow card) 44'; Johnston (yellow card) 59' (yellow-red card) 88'	Stadium: Wanderers Grounds; Attendance: 5,532; Referee: Silviu Petrescu

==== Second qualifying round ====
June 5 Leg 1	HFX Wanderers FC	2–1	Valour FC	Halifax, Nova Scotia
6:15 pm	Rampersad (yellow card) 26'; Skublak 39', (yellow card) 50'; Kourouma 41'; Bona (yellow card) 71'	Report	Bustos 33', (yellow card) 71'; Galvis (yellow card) 41'	Stadium: Wanderers Grounds; Attendance: 3,854; Referee: Juan Marquez

June 12 Leg 2	Valour FC	0–2 (1–4 agg.)	HFX Wanderers FC	Winnipeg, Manitoba
9:30 pm	Ohin (yellow card) 81'	Report	Kourouma 58'; Bona 90+3'	Stadium: IG Field; Attendance: 4,373; Referee: Yusri Rudolf

==== Third qualifying round ====
July 10 Leg 1	HFX Wanderers FC	2–3	Ottawa Fury FC	Halifax, Nova Scotia
7:00 pm	Perea 32' (pen.) (yellow card) 70'; Garcia (yellow card) 39'; Barnathan 62' (o.g.); Simmons (yellow card) 63'; Bona (yellow card) 72'	Report	Thiago 23', 35'; Irving (yellow card) 31'; Obasi (yellow card) 58'; Tissot 67'; Barnathan (yellow card) 70'	Stadium: Wanderers Grounds; Attendance: 6,213; Referee: Silviu Petrescu

July 24 Leg 2	Ottawa Fury FC	2–2 (5–4 agg.)	HFX Wanderers FC	Ottawa, Ontario
8:30 pm	Obasi 45+1'; François 66'; Oliveira (yellow card) 73'; Haworth (yellow card) 79'; Gagnon-Laparé (yellow card) 90+4'	Report	Skublak 30' (yellow card) 86'; Perea 43'; Schaale (yellow card) 73'	Stadium: TD Place Stadium; Attendance: 4,443; Referee: Pierre-Luc Lauzière

== Statistics ==
=== Squad and statistics ===
As of October 19, 2019

No.	Pos	Nat	Player	Total		CPL Spring season		CPL Fall season		Canadian Championship	
No.	Pos	Nat	Player	Apps	Goals	Apps	Goals	Apps	Goals	Apps	Goals
3	DF	(France) FRA	André Bona	31	1	8+2	0	14+1	0	5+1	1
4	DF	(Algeria) ALG	Chakib Hocine	6	0	0+0	0	4+0	0	2+0	0
5	DF	(Trinidad and Tobago) TTO	Elton John	21	0	6+1	0	11+0	0	3+0	0
6	DF	(Canada) CAN	Chrisnovic N'sa	21	0	5+1	0	9+3	0	2+1	0
7	MF	(Peru) PER	Juan Diego Gutiérrez	22	2	2+2	0	12+3	2	2+1	0
8	MF	(Canada) CAN	Elliot Simmons	17	0	6+1	0	4+2	0	4+0	0
9	MF	(Japan) JPN	Kodai Iida	25	1	8+2	0	4+6	1	4+1	0
10	FW	(Colombia) COL	Luis Alberto Perea	17	5	3+0	2	9+3	1	2+0	2
11	FW	(Trinidad and Tobago) TTO	Akeem Garcia	28	8	8+1	3	15+0	4	4+0	1
12	MF	(Guinea) GUI	Mohamed Kourouma	32	4	6+2	1	16+2	0	6+0	3
13	MF	(Ivory Coast) CIV	Kouamé Ouattara	7	0	2+2	0	1+1	0	0+1	0
14	FW	(Canada) CAN	Vincent Lamy	7	0	0+3	0	1+0	0	1+2	0
15	MF	(Canada) CAN	Scott Firth	9	0	0+2	0	2+4	0	0+1	0
16	DF	(Canada) CAN	Duran Lee	8	0	0+0	0	7+1	0	0+0	0
17	FW	(Canada) CAN	Tomasz Skublak	25	4	6+1	0	9+5	1	3+1	3
18	MF	(Trinidad and Tobago) TTO	Andre Rampersad	30	1	5+3	1	17+0	0	5+0	0
20	DF	(Canada) CAN	Ndzemdzela Langwa	24	0	8+1	0	6+4	0	4+1	0
21	GK	(Trinidad and Tobago) TTO	Jan-Michael Williams	15	0	7+0	0	5+0	0	3+0	0
22	MF	(Somalia) SOM	Abd-El-Aziz Yousef	0	0	0+0	0	0+0	0	0+0	0
23	DF	(Canada) CAN	Matthew Arnone	28	2	8+0	0	16+0	2	4+0	0
24	DF	(Canada) CAN	Alex De Carolis	21	0	4+0	0	11+2	0	2+2	0
25	DF	(Canada) CAN	Zachary Sukunda	21	0	5+0	0	5+7	0	2+2	0
50	GK	(Canada) CAN	Christian Oxner	21	0	3+0	0	13+2	0	3+0	0
Players who left during the season:
2	DF	(Germany) GER	Peter Schaale	22	1	10+0	1	7+0	0	5+0	0

=== Top scorers ===
Rank	Nat.	Player	Pos.	CPL Spring season	CPL Fall season	Canadian Championship	TOTAL
1	(Trinidad and Tobago)	Akeem Garcia	FW	3	4	1	8
2	(Colombia)	Luis Alberto Perea	FW	2	1	2	5
3	(Guinea)	Mohamed Kourouma	MF	1	0	3	4
3	(Canada)	Tomasz Skublak	FW	0	1	3	4
5	(Canada)	Matthew Arnone	DF	0	2	0	2
5	(Peru)	Juan Diego Gutiérrez	MF	0	2	0	2
7	(France)	André Bona	DF	0	0	1	1
7	(Japan)	Kodai Iida	MF	0	1	0	1
7	(Trinidad and Tobago)	Andre Rampersad	MF	1	0	0	1
7	(Germany)	Peter Schaale	DF	1	0	0	1
Own goals				0	2	1	3
Totals				8	13	11	32

Updated to match played October 19, 2019
Source: Canadian Premier League

=== Top assists ===
Rank	Nat.	Player	Pos.	CPL Spring season	CPL Fall season	Canadian Championship	TOTAL
1	(Guinea)	Mohamed Kourouma	MF	1	2	1	4
2	(Japan)	Kodai Iida	MF	2	0	1	3
3	(Germany)	Peter Schaale	DF	0	1	1	2
3	(Canada)	Tomasz Skublak	FW	0	1	1	2
5	(Canada)	Matthew Arnone	DF	0	0	1	1
5	(Peru)	Juan Diego Gutiérrez	MF	0	0	1	1
5	(Trinidad and Tobago)	Elton John	MF	0	1	0	1
5	(Colombia)	Luis Alberto Perea	FW	1	0	0	1
5	(Trinidad and Tobago)	Andre Rampersad	MF	0	1	0	1
5	(Canada)	Elliot Simmons	MF	0	0	1	1
Totals				4	6	7	17

Updated to match played October 19, 2019
Source: Canadian Premier League

=== Clean sheets ===
Rank	Nat.	Player	CPL Spring season	CPL Fall season	Canadian Championship	TOTAL
1	(Canada)	Christian Oxner	1	5	0	6
2	(Trinidad and Tobago)	Jan-Michael Williams	1	1	1	3
Totals			2	6	1	9

Updated to match played October 19, 2019
Source: Canadian Premier League

=== Disciplinary record ===
No.	Pos.	Nat.	Player	CPL Spring season		CPL Fall season		Canadian Championship		TOTAL	
No.	Pos.	Nat.	Player	Yellow card	Red card	Yellow card	Red card	Yellow card	Red card	Yellow card	Red card
1	GK	(Trinidad and Tobago)	Jan-Michael Williams	1	0	0	1	0	0	1	1
2	DF	(Germany)	Peter Schaale	1	0	1	0	1	0	3	0
3	DF	(France)	André Bona	3	0	4	0	2	0	9	0
4	DF	(Algeria)	Chakib Hocine	0	0	1	0	0	0	1	0
5	MF	(Trinidad and Tobago)	Elton John	0	0	3	0	0	0	3	0
6	DF	(Canada)	Chrisnovic N'sa	2	0	3	0	0	0	5	0
7	MF	(Peru)	Juan Diego Gutiérrez	1	0	2	0	1	0	4	0
8	MF	(Canada)	Elliot Simmons	1	0	1	0	1	0	3	0
9	MF	(Japan)	Kodai Iida	1	0	0	0	1	0	2	0
10	FW	(Colombia)	Luis Alberto Perea	1	0	1	0	1	0	3	0
11	FW	(Trinidad and Tobago)	Akeem Garcia	1	0	1	0	1	0	3	0
13	MF	(Ivory Coast)	Kouamé Ouattara	0	0	1	0	0	0	1	0
16	DF	(Canada)	Duran Lee	0	0	1	0	0	0	1	0
17	FW	(Canada)	Tomasz Skublak	1	0	3	0	3	0	7	0
18	MF	(Trinidad and Tobago)	Andre Rampersad	1	0	3	0	2	0	6	0
20	DF	(Canada)	Ndzemdzela Langwa	2	0	1	0	0	0	3	0
23	DF	(Canada)	Matthew Arnone	2	0	1	0	0	0	3	0
24	DF	(Canada)	Alex De Carolis	0	0	2	0	0	0	2	0
50	GK	(Canada)	Christian Oxner	0	0	2	0	0	0	2	0
Totals				18	0	31	1	13	0	62	1

Updated to match played October 19, 2019
Source: Canadian Premier League
