= 2019 Canadian Premier League season =

Inaugural season of the Canadian Premier League

Canadian Premier League
- Season: 2019
- Dates: April 27 – October 19 (regular season)
- Champions: Forge FC (1st title)
- CPL Shield: Cavalry FC (1st shield)
- 2019 CONCACAF League: Forge FC (Note: As winners of the CONCACAF League qualification series)
- 2020 CONCACAF League: Forge FC (Note: As 2019 CPL champions)
- Matches: 100
- Goals: 250 (2.5 per match)
- Top goalscorer: Tristan Borges (13 goals)
- Best goalkeeper: Marco Carducci; Triston Henry (9 clean sheets each)
- Biggest home win: York9 6–2 HFX Wanderers (July 27); York9 4–0 Forge FC (October 12)
- Biggest away win: Valour FC 0–8 Cavalry FC (September 2)
- Highest scoring: York9 6–2 HFX Wanderers (July 27); Valour FC 0–8 Cavalry FC (September 2)
- Longest winning run: 7 matches Cavalry FC (May 4 – June 19)
- Longest unbeaten run: 14 matches Forge FC (July 13 – October 6)
- Longest winless run: 10 matches FC Edmonton (August 16 – October 5); HFX Wanderers (August 10 – October 9)
- Longest losing run: 5 matches HFX Wanderers (July 13–31)
- Highest attendance: 17,611; Forge FC 1–1 York9 FC (April 27)
- Lowest attendance: 1,729; York9 FC 0–0 FC Edmonton (June 19)
- Total attendance: 419,314
- Average attendance: 4,279

The 2019 Canadian Premier League season was the inaugural season of the Canadian Premier League, the top level of Canadian professional soccer. The regular season began on April 27 and ended on October 19, with seven teams competing. The CPL's inaugural match took place between Forge FC and York9 at Tim Hortons Field on April 27, 2019, which ended in a 1–1 draw.

The CPL Finals were contested between the Spring and Fall season champions, Cavalry FC, and the Spring and Fall season runners-up, Forge FC, in October and November. Forge FC won 2–0 over two legs to win the inaugural Canadian Premier League title.

== Overview ==
=== Background ===
On May 6, 2017, the Canadian Premier League was unanimously approved and sanctioned by the Canadian Soccer Association. Seven teams competed in the first Canadian Premier League season, leaving four professional Canadian teams playing in United States-based leagues (Montreal Impact, Toronto FC and Vancouver Whitecaps FC in Major League Soccer and Ottawa Fury FC in the USL Championship). The CPL teams competed in the 2019 Canadian Championship with the Canadian MLS and USL teams, and the champions of the Ontario and Quebec tier three leagues.

=== Teams ===
2019 Canadian Premier League teams

Seven teams competed during this season – six newly-formed teams and one existing team which joined the CPL. The six new teams were Cavalry FC, Forge FC, HFX Wanderers FC, Pacific FC, Valour FC, and York9 FC. FC Edmonton announced their move to the CPL having previously ceased professional operations following their 2017 season in the North American Soccer League.

==== Stadiums and locations ====
Team	Location	Stadium	Capacity
Cavalry FC	Foothills County, Alberta	ATCO Field	5,288
FC Edmonton	Edmonton, Alberta	Clarke Stadium	5,100
Forge FC	Hamilton, Ontario	Tim Hortons Field	10,016
HFX Wanderers	Halifax, Nova Scotia	Wanderers Grounds	6,200
Pacific FC	Langford, British Columbia	Westhills Stadium	6,200
Valour FC	Winnipeg, Manitoba	IG Field	10,000
York9 FC	Toronto, Ontario	York Lions Stadium	8,000

==== Personnel and sponsorship ====
Note: All teams use the same kit manufacturer: Macron.

Team	Head coach	Captain(s)	Shirt sponsor
Cavalry FC	(England) Tommy Wheeldon Jr.	(Canada) Nik Ledgerwood	WestJet
FC Edmonton	(Canada) Jeff Paulus	(England) Tomi Ameobi	OneSoccer
Forge FC	(Canada) Bobby Smyrniotis	(Canada) Kyle Bekker	Tim Hortons
HFX Wanderers	(Trinidad and Tobago) Stephen Hart	(Trinidad and Tobago) Jan-Michael Williams	Volkswagen
Pacific FC	(Canada) James Merriman (Note: Merriman was named interim head coach on October 18 following Pacific's announcement that the club had relieved Michael Silberbauer of his duties as head coach.)	(Canada) Marcus Haber	Volkswagen
Valour FC	(England) Rob Gale	(Canada) Louis Béland-Goyette	OneSoccer
York9 FC	(Canada) Jimmy Brennan	(Canada) Manny Aparicio	Macron

==== Coaching changes ====
Team	Outgoing coach	Manner of departure	Date of vacancy	Position in table	Incoming coach	Date of appointment
Pacific FC	(Denmark) Michael Silberbauer	Fired	October 18, 2019	6th in Fall, 6th overall	(Canada) James Merriman (interim)	October 18, 2019

=== Format ===
The Canadian Premier League season ran from late April to October. Each team played 28 games, split between a spring and fall season. The 10-game spring season began on April 27 and ended on Canada Day, July 1. The 18-game fall season began on July 6 and ended on October 19. The winner of each season gained a berth into the 2019 Canadian Premier League Finals.

== Spring season ==
=== Table ===
Pos	Team	Pld	W	D	L	GF	GA	GD	Pts	Qualification
1	Cavalry	10	8	0	2	16	7	+9	24	2019 Canadian Premier League Finals
2	Forge	10	6	1	3	15	7	+8	19	2019 CONCACAF League preliminary round (Note: As winner of home and away matches between FC Edmonton, Forge FC, and Valour FC)
3	FC Edmonton	10	4	2	4	8	9	−1	14	
4	HFX Wanderers	10	3	2	5	8	11	−3	11	
5	Pacific	10	3	2	5	11	15	−4	11	
6	York9	10	2	5	3	9	11	−2	11	
7	Valour	10	3	0	7	8	15	−7	9	

Source: CanPL.ca
Rules for classification: 1) points; 2) total wins; 3) goal differential; 4) goals for; 5) away goal differential; 6) away goals for; 7) home goal differential; 8) home goals for; 9) coin toss or drawing of lots.

=== 2019 CONCACAF League qualification ===
One Canadian Premier League team qualifies annually for the CONCACAF League tournament. For the 2019 edition only, this slot was granted to one of the league's 'inaugural teams' (FC Edmonton, Forge FC, or Valour FC) based on their home and away matches in the 2019 spring season. In subsequent years, CONCACAF League qualification is awarded to the previous year's CPL champion.

Pos	Team	Pld	W	D	L	GF	GA	GD	Pts	Qualification	FOR	FCE	VAL
1	Forge FC	4	3	0	1	6	2	+4	9	2019 CONCACAF League	—	2–0	2–1
2	FC Edmonton	4	2	0	2	3	4	−1	6		1–0	—	0–1
3	Valour FC	4	1	0	3	3	6	−3	3		0–2	1–2	—

Source: CanPL.ca
Rules for classification: 1) points; 2) total wins; 3) goal differential; 4) goals for; 5) away goal differential; 6) away goals for; 7) home goal differential; 8) home goals for; 9) coin toss or drawing of lots.

=== Results ===
Home \ Away	CAV	FCE	FOR	HFX	PAC	VAL	YOR
Cavalry FC	—	1–0	0–1	2–0	—	1–0	2–1
FC Edmonton	0–3	—	1–0	2–0	0–0	0–1	—
Forge FC	1–2	2–0	—	—	3–0	2–1	1–1
HFX Wanderers	1–2	—	2–1	—	2–1	2–0	1–1
Pacific FC	3–1	1–3	—	1–0	—	1–2	2–2
Valour FC	—	1–2	0–2	1–0	1–2	—	1–3
York9	0–2	0–0	0–2	0–0	1–0	—	—

Source: CanPL.ca
Legend: Blue = home team win; Yellow = draw; Red = away team win.

== Fall season ==
=== Table ===
Pos	Team	Pld	W	D	L	GF	GA	GD	Pts	Qualification
1	Cavalry	18	11	5	2	35	12	+23	38	2019 Canadian Premier League Finals
2	Forge	18	11	4	3	30	19	+11	37	
3	York9	18	7	2	9	30	26	+4	23	
4	Pacific	18	5	5	8	24	31	−7	20	
5	Valour	18	5	4	9	22	37	−15	19	
6	FC Edmonton	18	4	6	8	19	24	−5	18	
7	HFX Wanderers	18	3	8	7	13	24	−11	17	

Source: CanPL.ca
Rules for classification: 1) points; 2) total wins; 3) goal differential; 4) goals for; 5) away goal differential; 6) away goals for; 7) home goal differential; 8) home goals for; 9) coin toss or drawing of lots.

=== Results ===
Home \ Away	CAV	FCE	FOR	HFX	PAC	VAL	YOR	CAV	FCE	FOR	HFX	PAC	VAL	YOR
Cavalry FC	—	0–0	2–1	2–0	1–1	4–1	1–0	—	3–1	—	—	4–1	—	3–1
FC Edmonton	0–1	—	1–1	2–0	3–1	0–0	2–2	—	—	0–1	—	3–1	—	1–3
Forge FC	1–0	1–2	—	2–0	3–0	3–1	2–1	1–0	—	—	2–2	—	—	1–0
HFX Wanderers	0–1	0–0	1–1	—	1–1	1–0	1–0	0–0	1–1	—	—	—	0–0	—
Pacific FC	2–3	1–0	2–3	3–1	—	2–1	0–2	—	—	1–1	1–1	—	2–0	—
Valour FC	1–1	3–1	1–3	2–0	2–2	—	0–4	0–8	3–1	1–3	—	—	—	—
York9	1–1	2–1	4–0	6–2	2–1	0–2	—	—	—	—	0–2	0–2	2–4	—

Source: CanPL.ca
Legend: Blue = home team win; Yellow = draw; Red = away team win.

== Finals ==
The winners of the spring and fall seasons gained berths to the two-legged CPL Finals. As a contingency implemented this year because a single team won both halves of the season, the second berth was given to the team with the second-best overall record. The two games were played on October 26, 2019, and November 2, 2019, with the winner of the Fall season choosing which leg to host.

=== Overall table ===
Pos	Team	Pld	W	D	L	GF	GA	GD	Pts	Qualification
1	Cavalry (S)	28	19	5	4	51	19	+32	62	2019 CPL finals (Note: As winner of the 2019 Spring and Fall seasons)
2	Forge (C)	28	17	5	6	45	26	+19	56	2019 CPL finals (Note: As second place in overall table)
3	York9	28	9	7	12	39	37	+2	34	
4	FC Edmonton	28	8	8	12	27	33	−6	32	
5	Pacific	28	8	7	13	35	46	−11	31	
6	Valour	28	8	4	16	30	52	−22	28	
7	HFX Wanderers	28	6	10	12	21	35	−14	28	

Source: CanPL.ca
Rules for classification: 1) points; 2) total wins; 3) goal differential; 4) goals for; 5) away goal differential; 6) away goals for; 7) home goal differential; 8) home goals for; 9) coin toss or drawing of lots.
(C) Champions; (S) Regular season winner

=== Results ===
The first leg was held on October 26, and the second leg on November 2, 2019.

Team 1	Agg.	Team 2	1st leg	2nd leg
Forge FC	2–0	Cavalry FC	1–0	1–0

== Attendance ==
Pos	Team	Total	High	Low	Average	Change
1	Forge FC	92,228	17,611	3,864	6,588	n/a
2	HFX Wanderers	84,860	6,244	5,387	6,061	n/a
3	Valour FC	74,694	9,699	3,173	5,335	n/a
4	Cavalry FC	46,091	4,697	1,938	3,292	n/a
5	Pacific FC	43,426	5,103	2,017	3,102	n/a
6	FC Edmonton	40,663	4,238	2,021	2,905	n/a
7	York9	37,352	4,260	1,729	2,668	n/a
	League total	419,314	17,611	1,729	4,279	n/a

== Statistical leaders ==
Statistics include regular season and Finals.

=== Top scorers ===
Rank	Player	Club	Goals
1	(Canada) Tristan Borges	Forge FC	13
2	(Canada) Terran Campbell	Pacific FC	11
2	(Republic of the Congo) Dominique Malonga	Cavalry FC	11
4	(Canada) Easton Ongaro	FC Edmonton	10
5	(Chile) Rodrigo Gattas	York9	9
6	(Trinidad and Tobago) Ryan Telfer	York9	8
7	(Sweden) Simon Adjei	York9	7
7	(Canada) Marco Bustos	Valour FC	7
7	(Trinidad and Tobago) Akeem Garcia	HFX Wanderers	7
7	(Brazil) Oliver	Cavalry FC	7

=== Top assists ===
Rank	Player	Club	Assists
1	(Canada) Kwame Awuah	Forge FC	5
1	(Canada) Kyle Bekker	Forge FC	5
1	(Canada) Tristan Borges	Forge FC	5
1	(Canada) Ben Fisk	Pacific FC	5
1	(Canada) Michael Petrasso	Valour FC	5
1	(United States) Blake Smith	Pacific FC	5
7	6 players tied		4

=== Clean sheets ===
Rank	Player	Club	Clean sheets
1	(Canada) Marco Carducci	Cavalry FC	9
1	(Canada) Triston Henry	Forge FC	9
3	(Canada) Connor James	FC Edmonton	7
4	(Canada) Nathan Ingham	York9	6
4	(Canada) Christian Oxner	HFX Wanderers	6
6	(Belgium) Mathias Janssens	Valour FC	4
6	(Guyana) Quillan Roberts	Forge FC	4
6	(Canada) Mark Village	Pacific FC	4
9	(Canada) Niko Giantsopoulos	Cavalry FC	3
10	(Canada) Tyson Farago	Valour FC	2
10	(Trinidad and Tobago) Jan-Michael Williams	HFX Wanderers	2

=== Hat-tricks ===
Player	For	Against	Result	Date	Ref
(Chile) Rodrigo Gattas	York9	HFX Wanderers	6–2 (H)	July 27	

== Awards ==
=== Premier Performer ===
The Premier Performer presented by Volkswagen Canada is presented to the CPL's top player based on an algorithm developed by the league and its data analysis provider. The winner receives a 2019 Volkswagen Jetta GLI, handed out at the Canadian Premier League Awards ceremony.

2019 Premier Performer top 5
Rank	Player	Points
1	(Canada) Marco Carducci (Cavalry FC)	77.36
2	(Canada) Nathan Ingham (York9 FC)	76.47
3	(Trinidad and Tobago) Ryan Telfer (York9 FC)	76.46
4	(Canada) Tristan Borges (Forge FC)	75.79
5	(Republic of the Congo) Dominique Malonga (Cavalry FC)	75.43

=== Canadian Premier League Awards ===
On November 1, 2019, the Canadian Premier League revealed the five individual awards to be given based on performance over the whole season including Finals. The awards are Inuit soapstone sculptures designed by artists from Cape Dorset, Nunavut. The recipients of the awards were announced at a ceremony in Toronto on November 26.

2019 Canadian Premier League Awards
Award	Recipient	Finalists
Golden Boot (Hunter)	(Canada) Tristan Borges (Forge FC)	N/A
Golden Glove (Qimmiq or Canadian Inuit Dog)	(Canada) Marco Carducci (Cavalry FC)	(Canada) Nathan Ingham (York9 FC) (Canada) Connor James (FC Edmonton)
Coach of the Year (Owl)	(England) Tommy Wheeldon Jr. (Cavalry FC)	(Canada) Jim Brennan (York9 FC) (Canada) Bobby Smyrniotis (Forge FC)
Player of the Year (Nikisuittuq)	(Canada) Tristan Borges (Forge FC)	(Canada) Kyle Bekker (Forge FC) (Republic of the Congo) Dominique Malonga (Cavalry FC)
Best Under 21 Canadian Player of the Year (Polar Bear)	(Canada) Tristan Borges (Forge FC)	(Canada) Diyaeddine Abzi (York9 FC) (Canada) Terran Campbell (Pacific FC)

=== Fan Awards ===
The Canadian Premier League allowed fans to vote for a series of Fan Awards for a chance to win various prizes. The winners were announced on December 16.

2019 CPL Fan Awards
Goal of the Year
Player	Opponent	Date	Time
(Canada) Kadell Thomas (Forge FC)	Valour FC	July 20	90+4'
Save of the Year (Allstate Good Hands Award)
Player	Opponent	Date	Time
(Canada) Marco Carducci (Cavalry FC)	Forge FC	October 26	39'
Team of the Year
Player	Position		
(Canada) Marco Carducci (Cavalry FC)	Goalkeeper		
(Canada) Morey Doner (York9 FC)	Right back		
(Belgium) Daniël Krutzen (Forge FC)	Left centre back		
(Canada) Dominick Zator (Cavalry FC)	Right centre back		
(Canada) Kwame Awuah (Forge FC)	Left back		
(England) Elijah Adekugbe (Cavalry FC)	Defensive midfielder		
(Canada) Tristan Borges (Forge FC)	Right centre midfielder		
(Canada) Kyle Bekker (Forge FC)	Left centre midfielder		
(Canada) Nico Pasquotti (Cavalry FC)	Right wing		
(Canada) Marco Bustos (Valour FC)	Left wing		
(Republic of the Congo) Dominique Malonga (Cavalry FC)	Striker		

== Player transfers ==
=== U Sports Draft ===
The 2018 CPL–U Sports Draft was held on November 12 in Vancouver, British Columbia. Draftees were invited to team preseason camps, with an opportunity to earn a developmental contract and retain their U Sports men's soccer eligibility. Cavalry FC selected Gabriel Bitar with the first overall pick. Three players were selected by each team, with a total of twenty-one players being drafted including fifteen Canadians.

=== Foreign players ===
Canadian Premier League teams may sign a maximum of seven international players, out of which only five can be in the starting line-up for each match. The following players are considered foreign players for the 2019 season. This list does not include Canadian citizens who represent other countries at international level.

Club	Player 1	Player 2	Player 3	Player 4	Player 5	Player 6	Player 7
Cavalry FC	(England) Jordan Brown	(Germany) Julian Büscher	(Honduras) José Escalante	(Republic of the Congo) Dominique Malonga	(England) Nathan Mavila	(Brazil) Oliver	
FC Edmonton	(Belgium) Oumar Diouck	(Cameroon) Jeannot Esua	(Haiti) James Marcelin	(Trinidad and Tobago) Kareem Moses	(South Korea) Son Yong-chan	(Spain) Ramón Soria	(Cameroon) Tony Tchani
Forge FC	(Sweden) Alexander Achinioti-Jönsson	(Senegal) Elimane Cissé	(Belgium) Daniël Krutzen	(Cameroon) Bertrand Owundi			
HFX Wanderers	(Trinidad and Tobago) Akeem Garcia	(Peru) Juan Gutiérrez	(Japan) Kodai Iida	(Trinidad and Tobago) Elton John	(Colombia) Luis Perea	(Trinidad and Tobago) Andre Rampersad	(Trinidad and Tobago) Jan-Michael Williams
Pacific FC	(Panama) Alexander González	(Germany) Hendrik Starostzik					
Valour FC	(Uruguay) Martín Arguiñarena	(Spain) José Galán	(Croatia) Josip Golubar	(Belgium) Mathias Janssens	(England) Adam Mitter	(Italy) Michele Paolucci	
York9 FC	(Sweden) Simon Adjei	(Japan) Wataru Murofushi	(Chile) Rodrigo Gattas				
