= Juan Diego Gutiérrez =

Peruvian footballer (born 1992)

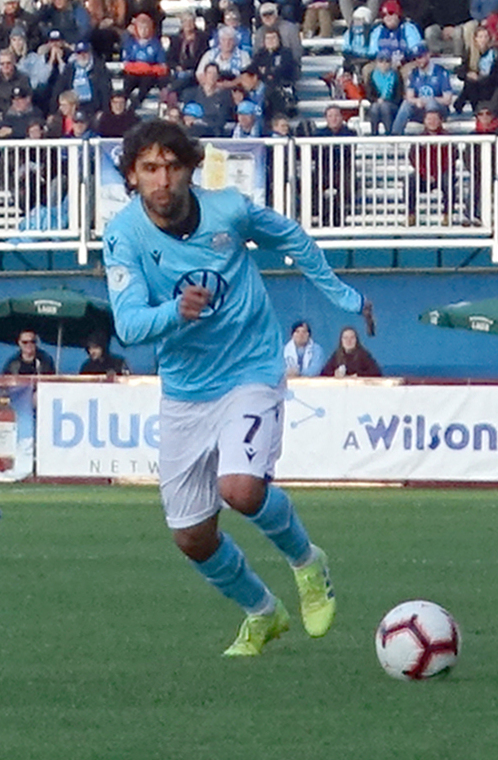
- Gutiérrez in 2019 with HFX Wanderers FC

Personal information
- Full name: Juan Diego Gutiérrez de la Casas
- Date of birth: 28 April 1992 (age 34)
- Place of birth: Lima, Peru
- Height: 1.70 m (5 ft 7 in)
- Position: Midfielder

Team information
- Current team: Deportivo Garcilaso

Youth career
- Universidad San Martín

Senior career*
Years	Team	Apps	(Gls)
2011–2014	Universidad San Martín	66	(9)
2015–2016	Universitario	37	(5)
2016–2017	Vejle	6	(0)
2017	→ Universitario (loan)	3	(0)
2017	→ Gefle IF (loan)	13	(0)
2018	Sport Boys	2	(0)
2018	Sport Rosario	11	(1)
2019	HFX Wanderers	19	(2)
2020	Oriente Petrolero	5	(1)
2020	Carlos Stein	15	(0)
2021	Unión Comercio	0	(0)
2021–2022	Sololá	40	(5)
2022	Santa Coloma	10	(1)
2023-	Deportivo Garcilaso	0	(0)
- * Club domestic league appearances and goals as of 18:40, 6 October 2022 (UTC)

Juan Diego Gutiérrez de la Casas (born 28 April 1992) is a Peruvian professional footballer who plays as a midfielder for Deportivo Garcilaso.

== Career ==
=== Universidad San Martín ===
Gutiérrez made his professional debut in the Torneo Descentralizado on 27 November 2011 in Round 29 of the 2011 season against Cienciano. He was given his debut by former manager Aníbal Ruiz as he was substituted in for Christian Cueva in the 85th minute of the match, which finished in a 2–0 win for his side. He only managed to make that one league appearance and mainly played in the reserve team that season.

The following season, he was promoted to the first team squad by manager Franco Navarro for the start of the 2012 season. He made his Descentralizado debut that season away to the Inca Garcilaso Stadium against Cienciano and played until the 83rd minute before coming off for Khader Jasaui, as the match eventually finished in a 2–0 loss for his side. In his third match of the season he scored his first league goal in the 1–2 loss at home to Sport Huancayo.

=== Vejle ===
On 17 July 2016, it was announced, that Gutiérrez had signed with Danish 1st Division-side Vejle Boldklub.

=== Sport Boys ===
On 19 December 2017, Gutiérrez returned to Peru, signing with Peruvian Primera División side Sport Boys.

=== HFX Wanderers ===
On 25 February 2019, Gutiérrez signed with Canadian Premier League side HFX Wanderers, joining former Universidad San Martín teammate Luis Alberto Perea for the team's first ever season. On 14 December 2019, the club announced that Gutiérrez would not be returning for the 2020 season.

=== Oriente Petrolero ===
On 8 January 2020, Gutiérrez signed with Bolivian Primera División side Oriente Petrolero.

=== Carlos Stein ===
In the summer 2020, Gutiérrez returned to Peru, signing for FC Carlos Stein.

=== Santa Coloma ===
After a short spell at Unión Comercio, followed by a spell at Sololá in Guatemala, Gutiérrez joined Andorran club FC Santa Coloma in August 2022.

== Career statistics ==
As of 23 November 2020

Appearances and goals by club, season and competition
Club	Season	League			National Cup (Note: Includes Copa Inca and Canadian Championship.)		Continental (Note: Includes Copa Sudamericana.)		Other		Total	
Club	Season	Division	Apps	Goals	Apps	Goals	Apps	Goals	Apps	Goals	Apps	Goals
Universidad San Martín	2011	Peruvian Primera División	1	0	0	0	—		0	0	1	0
Universidad San Martín	2012	Peruvian Primera División	32	6	—		1	0	0	0	33	6
Universidad San Martín	2013	Peruvian Primera División	33	3	—		—		0	0	33	3
Universidad San Martín	2014	Peruvian Primera División	0	0	0	0	—		0	0	0	0
Universidad San Martín	Total		66	9	0	0	1	0	0	0	67	9
Universitario	2015	Peruvian Primera División	25	2	8	2	4	0	0	0	37	4
Universitario	2016	Peruvian Primera División	12	3	—		0	0	0	0	12	3
Universitario	Total		37	5	8	2	4	0	0	0	49	7
Vejle	2016–17	Danish 1st Division	6	0	0	0	—		0	0	6	0
Universitario (loan)	2017	Peruvian Primera División	3	0	—		0	0	0	0	3	0
Gefle IF (loan)	2017	Superettan	13	0	0	0	—		0	0	13	0
Sport Boys	2018	Peruvian Primera División	2	0	—		—		0	0	2	0
Sport Rosario	2018	Peruvian Primera División	11	1	—		0	0	0	0	11	1
HFX Wanderers	2019	Canadian Premier League	19	2	3	0	—		0	0	22	2
Oriente Petrolero	2020	Bolivian Primera División	5	1	—		1	0	0	0	6	1
Carlos Stein	2020	Peruvian Primera División	15	0	0	0	—		0	0	15	0
Career total			177	18	11	2	6	0	0	0	194	20
