= Elliot Simmons =

English footballer

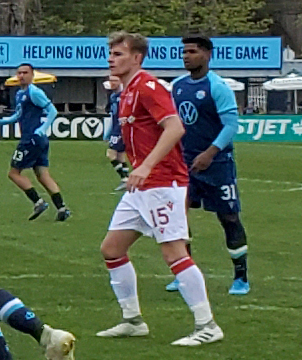
- Simmons (red kit) with Cavalry in 2022

Personal information
- Full name: Elliot James Simmons
- Date of birth: 5 February 1998 (age 28)
- Place of birth: Luton, England
- Position: Midfielder

Team information
- Current team: Real Bedford

Youth career
- Goulbourn SC
- 2007–2010: Ottawa Fury
- 2010–2014: Milton Keynes Dons
- 2016: FC Málaga City
- 2017: Dalkurd

Senior career*
Years	Team	Apps	(Gls)
2017–2018	Dalkurd	0	(0)
2018	→ Mikkelin Palloilijat (loan)	20	(0)
2019	HFX Wanderers	13	(0)
2020–2022	Cavalry FC	59	(1)
2023–2024	Vancouver FC	25	(0)
2024–2025	Wealdstone	0	(0)
2024–2025	→ Bedford Town (loan)	20	(0)
2025	Bedford Town	15	(0)
2025–	Real Bedford	0	(0)
- * Club domestic league appearances and goals as of April 26, 2025

Elliot James Simmons (born 5 February 1998) is an English professional footballer who plays as a midfielder for Southern League Premier Division Central club Real Bedford.

== Early life ==
Simmons was born in Luton, England, to English parents and moved to Stittsville, Canada with his family at the age of five. He began playing youth soccer at age six with Goulbourn SC. Afterwards, he joined the Ottawa Fury Academy at age nine.

At age ten, he attended a scouting camp led by the West Ham Academy and was invited to England where he trialed with the West Ham and Arsenal youth systems, before ultimately joining the MK Dons academy in March 2010. At the age of 16, he continued his development at MK College where he was regularly called up to the England Colleges side. In 2016, he joined the FC Málaga City Academy in Spain. In 2017, he played with the U19 and U21 teams of Swedish club Dalkurd FF.

== Club career ==
In 2017, Simmons signed his first professional contract with Swedish Allsvenskan side Dalkurd FF. In November 2017, he was loaned to Finnish Kakkonen side Mikkelin Palloilijat.

In January 2019, he signed with HFX Wanderers FC of the Canadian Premier League. He had had other offers to remain in Europe, but chose to return to Canada, intrigued by the opportunity to play in the league's inaugural season. At the end of the season, he departed the club. In November 2019, he went on trial with Swedish club GAIS.

In February 2020, he signed with Cavalry FC. In November 2020, Simmons re-signed with the club for the 2021 season and also spent the offseason training with Swedish Allsvenskan club Östersunds FK. On June 30, 2021, he scored his first professional goal in a match against Atlético Ottawa. In January 2022, it was announced Simmons would return for the 2022 season, his third with the club.

In December 2022, he signed with Vancouver FC ahead of the 2023 season. In January 2023, Simmons joined Championship club Huddersfield Town on a training stint. In September 2023, he was named to the CPL Team of the Week for the first time. After the season, he went on a training stint with English National League side Barnet, as well as another club in the same league. In May 2024, he departed the club by mutual consent.

In June 2024, Simmons joined English National League side Wealdstone. In August 2024, he went on loan to Bedford Town in the seventh tier Southern Football League Premier Central. In January 2025, he agreed to a mutual termination of his contract with Wealdstone and joined Bedford Town on a permanent basis. He helped the team win the league title in 2024-25, earning promotion to the National League North.

In September 2025, he returned to the Southern League Premier Division Central, joining rivals Real Bedford.

== International career ==
Simmons is eligible to represent Canada and England internationally. In his youth, he played five games with the English Colleges FA.

In September 2015, he made his debut in the Canadian national program, attending a training camp with the Canada under-20 team, subsequently attending another camp in January 2017.

== Career statistics ==
As of October 7, 2023

Club	Season	League			Playoffs		Domestic Cup		Continental		Total	
Club	Season	Division	Apps	Goals	Apps	Goals	Apps	Goals	Apps	Goals	Apps	Goals
Dalkurd FF	2018	Allsvenskan	0	0	–		0	0	–		0	0
Mikkelin Palloilijat (loan)	2018	Kakkonen	20	0	–		–		–		20	0
HFX Wanderers FC	2019	Canadian Premier League	13	0	–		4	0	–		17	0
Cavalry FC	2020	Canadian Premier League	10	0	–		–		–		10	0
Cavalry FC	2021	Canadian Premier League	25	1	0	0	2	0	–		27	1
Cavalry FC	2022	Canadian Premier League	24	0	2	0	2	0	–		28	0
Cavalry FC	Total		59	1	2	0	4	0	0	0	65	1
Vancouver FC	2023	Canadian Premier League	25	0	–		1	0	–		26	0
Vancouver FC	2024	Canadian Premier League	0	0	–		0	0	–		0	0
Vancouver FC	Total		25	0	0	0	1	0	0	0	26	0
Career total			117	1	2	0	9	0	0	0	128	1
