= Duran Lee =

Canadian soccer player (born 1995)

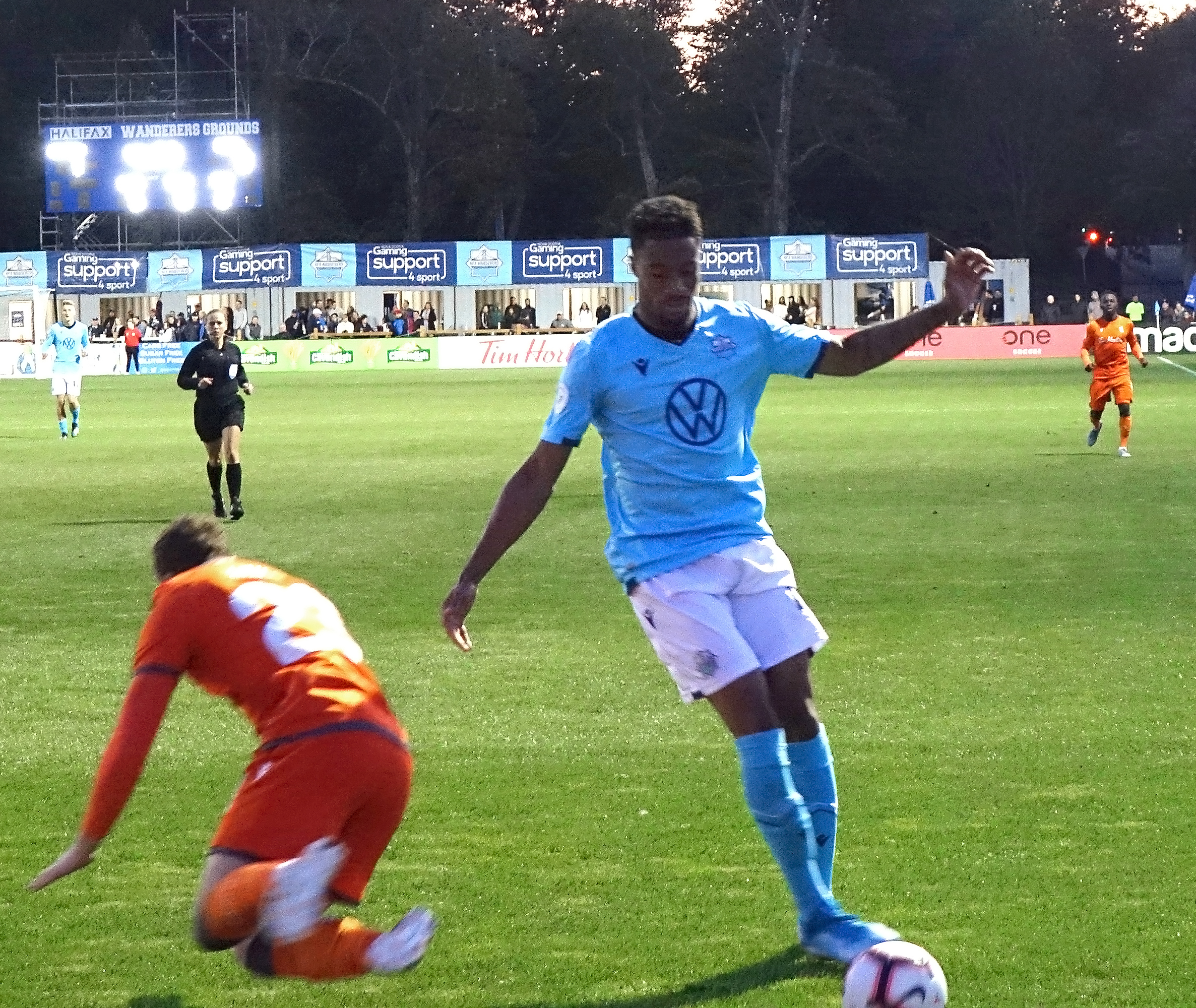
- Lee (right) in 2019 with HFX Wanderers FC

Personal information
- Date of birth: May 9, 1995 (age 31)
- Place of birth: Toronto, Ontario, Canada
- Height: 1.88 m (6 ft 2 in)
- Positions: Left-back; centre-back

Youth career
- –2011: Brampton Youth SC
- 2011–2013: Toronto FC

College career
Years	Team	Apps	(Gls)
2013	Western Texas Westerners		
2015	Dodge City Conquistadors	15	(3)
2016	UConn Huskies	5	(0)
2017	UMass Lowell River Hawks	15	(0)

Senior career*
Years	Team	Apps	(Gls)
2012	TFC Academy		
2014	Lane United FC	6	(0)
2015–2018	Sigma FC	21+	(1+)
2019	Vaughan Azzurri	9	(1)
2019	HFX Wanderers	8	(0)
2020	FC Edmonton	2	(0)
2021	Pacific FC	0	(0)
2023	Des Moines Menace	0	(0)
2023	North Mississauga SC	1	(0)
2023	Des Moines Menace	1	(0)
- * Club domestic league appearances and goals as of May 7, 2023

Duran Lee (born May 9, 1995) is a Canadian former soccer player who plays as a left-back and centre-back.

== Early life ==
Lee played basketball and soccer as a child, before deciding to pursue soccer as his main sport. He began playing youth soccer with Brampton YSC. When he was 12 or 13, he had a brief trial with Chelsea academy. Lee later joined the Toronto FC Academy.

== College career ==
In 2013, Lee attended Western Texas College and was named to the All-Region team.

In 2015, Lee began attending Dodge City Community College, where he played for the men's soccer team. On September 30, 2015, he scored his first goal against the Neosho County Panthers. On October 17, 2015, he scored a brace against the Kansas City Kansas Blue Devils. In his single season with Dodge City, he scored three goals and led the team with six assists.

In 2016, Lee transferred to the University of Connecticut, where he joined the men's soccer team.

In 2017, Lee transferred to the University of Massachusetts Lowell, joining their men's soccer team. On September 4, 2017, he picked up his first point, earning an assist against the Harvard Crimson.

== Club career ==
In 2012, he played with the TFC Academy in the Canadian Soccer League.

In 2014, he played with Lane United FC in the Premier Development League.

In 2015, Lee began playing with Sigma FC in League1 Ontario. In 2018, he trialed with Portuguese club Sertanense, but was unable to sign as the team was experiencing financial issues.

In 2019, he joined Vaughan Azzurri, shifting to the centre-back position.

In August 2019, he signed his first professional contract with the HFX Wanderers of the Canadian Premier League, against whom he had played against in the 2019 Canadian Championship with Vaughan. He made his debut on August 28 against Valour FC.

In January 2020, he signed with FC Edmonton. In an interview, Lee stated that hoped to be utilized as a left-back for Edmonton, rather than a centre-back, which is where he played in Halifax.

In March 2021, he joined Pacific FC. However, during pre-season, he ruptured his Achilles tendon, ruling him out for the entire season. After the season, he departed the club.

In February 2023, he signed with the Des Moines Menace in USL League Two. In April, he played the first match of the season in League1 Ontario with North Mississauga SC.

== Personal life ==
Lee was named after the English band Duran Duran.

== Career statistics ==
As of April 10, 2023

Club	League	Season	League		Playoffs		National Cup		Continental		Total	
Club	League	Season	Apps	Goals	Apps	Goals	Apps	Goals	Apps	Goals	Apps	Goals
Lane United FC	Premier Development League	2014	6	0	—		—		—		6	0
Sigma FC	League1 Ontario	2015	?	?	—		—		—		?	?
Sigma FC	League1 Ontario	2016	5	0	—		—		—		5	0
Sigma FC	League1 Ontario	2017	5	1	—		—		—		5	1
Sigma FC	League1 Ontario	2018	11	0	3	0	—		—		19	0
Sigma FC	Total		21	1	3	0	0	0	0	0	24	1
Vaughan Azzurri	League1 Ontario	2019	9	1	0	0	2	0	—		11	1
HFX Wanderers FC	Canadian Premier League	2019	8	0	—		0	0	—		8	0
FC Edmonton	Canadian Premier League	2020	2	0	—		—		—		2	0
Pacific FC	Canadian Premier League	2021	0	0	0	0	0	0	—		0	0
Des Moines Menace	USL League Two	2023	0	0	0	0	2	0	—		2	0
North Mississauga SC	League1 Ontario	2023	1	0	—		—		—		1	0
Career total			47	2	3	0	4	0	0	0	54	2
