= Ndzemdzela Langwa =

Canadian soccer player (born 1998)

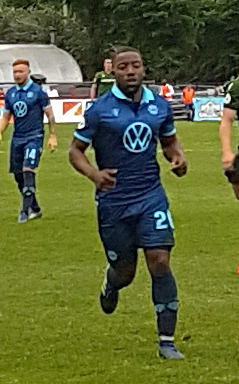
- Langwa playing for HFX Wanderers in 2019

Personal information
- Date of birth: 5 March 1998 (age 28)
- Place of birth: Ottawa, Ontario, Canada
- Height: 1.78 m (5 ft 10 in)
- Positions: Left-back; midfielder

Team information
- Current team: AS Laval

Youth career
- Goulbourn SC
- 2007–2012: Ottawa South United
- 2012–2013: Toronto FC
- 2014: Ottawa South United
- 2014–2015: Ottawa Fury FC
- 2015–2016: Vancouver Whitecaps FC

Senior career*
Years	Team	Apps	(Gls)
2014	Cataraqui Clippers	4	(0)
2015	Ottawa Fury FC Academy	5	(1)
2017–2018	Triestina	2	(0)
2018	→ Palmese (loan)	13	(2)
2018–2019	Socuéllamos		
2019	HFX Wanderers	19	(0)
2021	Ocean City Nor'easters	0	(0)
2021–2022	VfB Straubing	11	(0)
2022	SV Donaustauf	5	(0)
2025	Palm City	4	(0)
2026	AS Laval	5	(0)

International career^{‡}
2014	Canada U17	4	(0)
- * Club domestic league appearances and goals as of May 8, 2026 ‡ National team caps and goals as of 10 September 2022

Ndzemdzela Langwa (born March 5, 1998), sometimes known as "Zoom" Langwa, is a Canadian former soccer player.

== Early life ==
Born in Ottawa, to parents of Cameroonian descent, he began playing soccer at age 3 with Goulbourn SC. In 2009, Langwa began playing at Ottawa South United. In 2012, he joined Toronto FC Academy, where he spent two seasons. In 2014, he returned to Ottawa South United for their U17 team in the OYSL.

== Club career ==
=== Semi-pro ===
Late in 2014, he played for the Cataraqui Clippers in League1 Ontario, before returning to Ottawa to play for the Ottawa Fury Academy's U19 team in 2014 and their Première Ligue de soccer du Québec side in 2015. In 2015 he switched academy programs again, this time joining Vancouver Whitecaps FC Academy.

=== Italy ===
In March 2017, after months of difficulty acquiring a visa, Langwa officially signed with Italian Serie C club Triestina. He made his league debut on September 24, 2017 against Mestre.

In January 2018, Langwa was loaned to Serie D side Palmese until the end of the season.

=== Spain ===
In the summer of 2018, Langwa trialled with Spanish Tercera División side UD Socuéllamos during preseason. After impressing during a friendly, he signed with the club in August 2018.

=== North America ===
In February 2019 Langwa returned to Canada, signing with Canadian Premier League side HFX Wanderers. After the 2019 season, the club announced that Langwa would not be returning for the 2020 season.

Following trials with Romanian second division side Pandurri, Spanish fourth division club Alhaurín de la Torre, and German Bundesliga club Schalke, Langwa eventually signed with Ocean City Nor'easters in the American fourth tier USL League Two, on May 7, 2021.

=== Germany ===
In 2021, he joined VfB Straubing in the German sixth tier Landesliga Bayern-Mitte. He made his debut on September 3 against SpVgg SV Weiden.

In 2022, he joined SV Donaustauf in the Regionalliga Nord.

=== UAE ===
In October 2025, Langwa signed with UAE Second Division League side FC Palm City.

== International career ==
Langwa is eligible to represent Canada and Cameroon internationally.

Langwa was called up to the Canadian U17 team for the 2014 Tournoi Montaigu and made four appearances.

== Personal life ==
Langwa grew up in Stittsville, a suburb south-west of Ottawa, Ontario and attended Sacred Heart Catholic High School. He received the nickname 'Zoom due to his pace down the left side.

== Career statistics ==
As of September 10, 2022

Club	Season	League			Playoffs		Domestic Cup		League Cup		Total	
Club	Season	Division	Apps	Goals	Apps	Goals	Apps	Goals	Apps	Goals	Apps	Goals
Cataraqui Clippers	2014	League1 Ontario	4	0	–		–		?	?	4	0
Ottawa Fury FC Academy	2015	PLSQ	5	1	–		–		0	0	5	1
Triestina	2017–18	Serie C	4	0	–		2	0	–		4	0
Palmese (loan)	2017–18	Serie D	13	2	–		0	0	–		13	2
Socuéllamos	2018–19	Tercera División	0	0	0	0	0	0	–		0	0
HFX Wanderers	2019	Canadian Premier League	19	0	–		5	0	–		24	0
VfB Straubing	2021–22	Landesliga Bayern-Mitte	11	0	–		0	0	–		11	0
SV Donaustauf	2022–23	Regionalliga Nord	5	0	–		0	0	–		5	0
Career total			61	3	0	0	7	0	0	0	68	3
