= Kouamé Ouattara =

Ivorian professional footballer (born 1991)

Personal information
- Full name: Kouamé Ali Martial Ouattara
- Date of birth: 8 June 1991 (age 35)
- Place of birth: Ouragahio, Ivory Coast
- Height: 1.73 m (5 ft 8 in)
- Positions: Midfielder; defender

College career
Years	Team	Apps	(Gls)
2010	Moncton Aigles Bleus	9	(0)
2013–2014	Moncton Aigles Bleus	21	(2)

Senior career*
Years	Team	Apps	(Gls)
2016	Gatineau	4	(0)
2019	HFX Wanderers	6	(0)
- * Club domestic league appearances and goals as of 28 August 2019

Kouamé Ali Martial Ouattara (born 6 June 1991) is an Ivorian professional footballer who plays as a midfielder.

== Club career ==
=== Gatineau ===
In 2016, he signed with Première Ligue de soccer du Québec side FC Gatineau. He made four appearances before suffering an injury which forced him to leave the club and return to Moncton.

=== HFX Wanderers ===
In September 2018, Ouattara participated in the Canadian Premier League Open Trials in Halifax. On 21 February 2019, he signed with CPL side HFX Wanderers and made his debut as a substitute in the club's inaugural match on 28 April 2019. On 14 December 2019, the club announced that Ouattara would not be returning for the 2020 season.
