= Zachary Sukunda =

Canadian soccer player (born 1995)

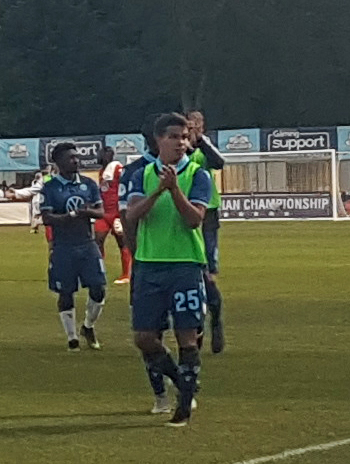
- Sukunda with HFX Wanderers in 2019

Personal information
- Full name: Zachary Joseph Eli Sukunda
- Date of birth: June 24, 1995 (age 31)
- Place of birth: Ottawa, Ontario, Canada
- Height: 1.75 m (5 ft 9 in)
- Positions: Full-back; midfielder

Team information
- Current team: Eintracht Nordhorn

Youth career
- Brockville SC
- Ottawa South United
- Ottawa Fury
- 2010–2011: AS Hull
- 2011–2012: Auxerre
- 2012–2015: Montreal Impact

Senior career*
Years	Team	Apps	(Gls)
2015–2016	FC Montreal	45	(1)
2017	Umeå FC	14	(0)
2018	Hume City	13	(0)
2018	Northcote City	6	(0)
2019	HFX Wanderers	17	(0)
2020	EIF	19	(1)
2021–2022	PEPO	46	(6)
2023	Gnistan	26	(1)
2024	Valour FC	13	(0)
2025	Kalev	23	(1)
2026–	Eintracht Nordhorn	0	(0)
- * Club domestic league appearances and goals as of November 17, 2025

Zachary Joseph Eli Sukunda (born June 24, 1995) is a Canadian soccer player who plays for German club Eintracht Nordhorn in the Landesliga Weser-Ems.

== Early life ==
Sukunda was born in Ottawa, Ontario. He began playing youth soccer with Brockville SC, before moving on to Ottawa South United and then to the Ottawa Fury Academy. He later played youth soccer with AS Hull. In 2011, after attending a scouting camp in Toronto, he was invited to trial and then play with the youth system of French club AJ Auxerre. In 2012, Sukunda joined the Montreal Impact Academy.

== Club career ==
In 2015, he began his senior career, signing with the Montreal Impact's second team FC Montreal in the USL. He made his professional debut on April 18, 2015 against the Harrisburg City Islanders. He scored his first professional goal on June 21, 2016, in a 3-2 victory over the Harrisburg City Islanders. After the 2016 season, the club ceased operation, resulting in Sekunda having to find a new club.

In March 2017, Sukunda signed with Swedish Division 1 Norra club Umeå FC. In December, he left the club.

In December 2017, Sukunda signed with Australian club Hume City FC of the NPL Victoria.

In June 2018, Sukunda joined Northcote City FC.

In November 2018, Sukunda was announced as the first ever signing for HFX Wanderers FC of the new Canadian Premier League. After the 2019 season, the club declined his option for the 2020 season and despite interest from other CPL clubs, he sought a return to Europe instead.

In December 2019, Sukunda signed with Finnish Ykkönen side Ekenäs IF for the 2020 season.

In February 2021, he signed with PEPO Lappeenranta. After the 2021 season, he signed an extension for the 2022 season.

In January 2023, Sukunda joined Gnistan in Finland. He helped Gnistan reach second place in the table, however, they lost in the promotion playoff final, failing to earn promotion.

In December 2023, he returned to the Canadian Premier League and signed with Valour FC, ahead of the 2024 season.

In January 2025, Sukunda signed with Estonian club Kalev in the Meistriliiga.

In January 2026, he signed with Eintracht Nordhorn in the German sixth-tier Landesliga Weser-Ems.

== Personal life ==
Sukunda is the son of Eli Sukunda, a fencer who competed at the 1976 and 1984 Summer Olympics.

== Career statistics ==
As of 23 October 2024.

Appearances and goals by club, season and competition
Club	Season	League			Cup (Note: Includes Canadian Championship and Suomen Cup)		Other		Total	
Club	Season	Division	Apps	Goals	Apps	Goals	Apps	Goals	Apps	Goals
FC Montreal	2015	USL	23	0	–		–		23	0
FC Montreal	2016	USL	21	1	–		–		21	1
FC Montreal	Total		44	1	0	0	0	0	44	1
Umeå FC	2017	Swedish Division 1	15	0	–		–		15	0
Hume City	2018	NPL Victoria	13	0	–		–		13	0
Northcote City	2018	NPL Victoria	6	0	–		–		6	0
HFX Wanderers	2019	Canadian Premier League	17	0	4	0	–		21	0
Ekenäs IF	2020	Ykkönen	19	1	5	0	–		24	1
PEPO Lappeenranta	2021	Kakkonen	22	5	1	0	1	0	24	5
PEPO Lappeenranta	2022	Ykkönen	24	1	2	2	3	0	29	3
PEPO Lappeenranta	Total		46	6	3	2	4	0	53	8
Gnistan	2023	Ykkönen	26	1	3	0	3	1	32	2
Valour FC	2024	Canadian Premier League	13	0	1	0	–		14	0
Tallinna Kalev	2025	Meistriliiga	0	0	0	0	–		0	0
Career total			199	9	16	2	7	1	222	12

== Honours ==
Gnistan

- Ykkönen runner-up: 2023
