= Canadian Premier League Golden Boot =

Soccer award for top goal scorers

Golden Boot
- Sport: Soccer
- League: Canadian Premier League
- Awarded for: Most goals in a season
- Country: Canada

History
- First award: 2019
- First winner: Tristan Borges (CAN)
- Most recent: Loïc Kwemi (CAN)
- Website: www.cplsoccer.com/awards

The Canadian Premier League Golden Boot has been awarded since the inaugural 2019 season to the Canadian Premier League's leading scorer. The award is given to the player with the most goals in the regular season. Until 2021, the Golden Boot also included goals scored in the CPL playoffs and Finals. The trophy is an Inuit art carving by Pitseolak Qimirpik of Kinngait, Nunavut, depicting an Indigenous hunter.

Samuel Salter has the record for most goals scored in a single season, with 19 goals for Atlético Ottawa in 2025.

== Winners ==
CPL Golden Boot
Season	Player	Nationality	Club	Goals	Games	Rate	Ref.
2019	Tristan Borges	Canada	Forge FC	13	27	0.48	
2020	Akeem Garcia	Trinidad and Tobago	HFX Wanderers FC	6	11	0.55	
2021	João Morelli	Brazil	HFX Wanderers FC	14	21	0.67	
2022	Alejandro Díaz	Mexico	Pacific FC	13	18	0.72	
2023	Ollie Bassett	Northern Ireland	Atlético Ottawa	11	27	0.41	
2023	Myer Bevan	New Zealand	Cavalry FC	11	26	0.42	
2024	Tobias Warschewski	Germany	Cavalry FC	12	24	0.5	
2025	Samuel Salter	Canada	Atlético Ottawa	19	28	0.68	
2026	Loïc Kwemi	Canada	FC Supra du Québec	15	26	0.58	
