= André Bona =

French footballer (born 1990)

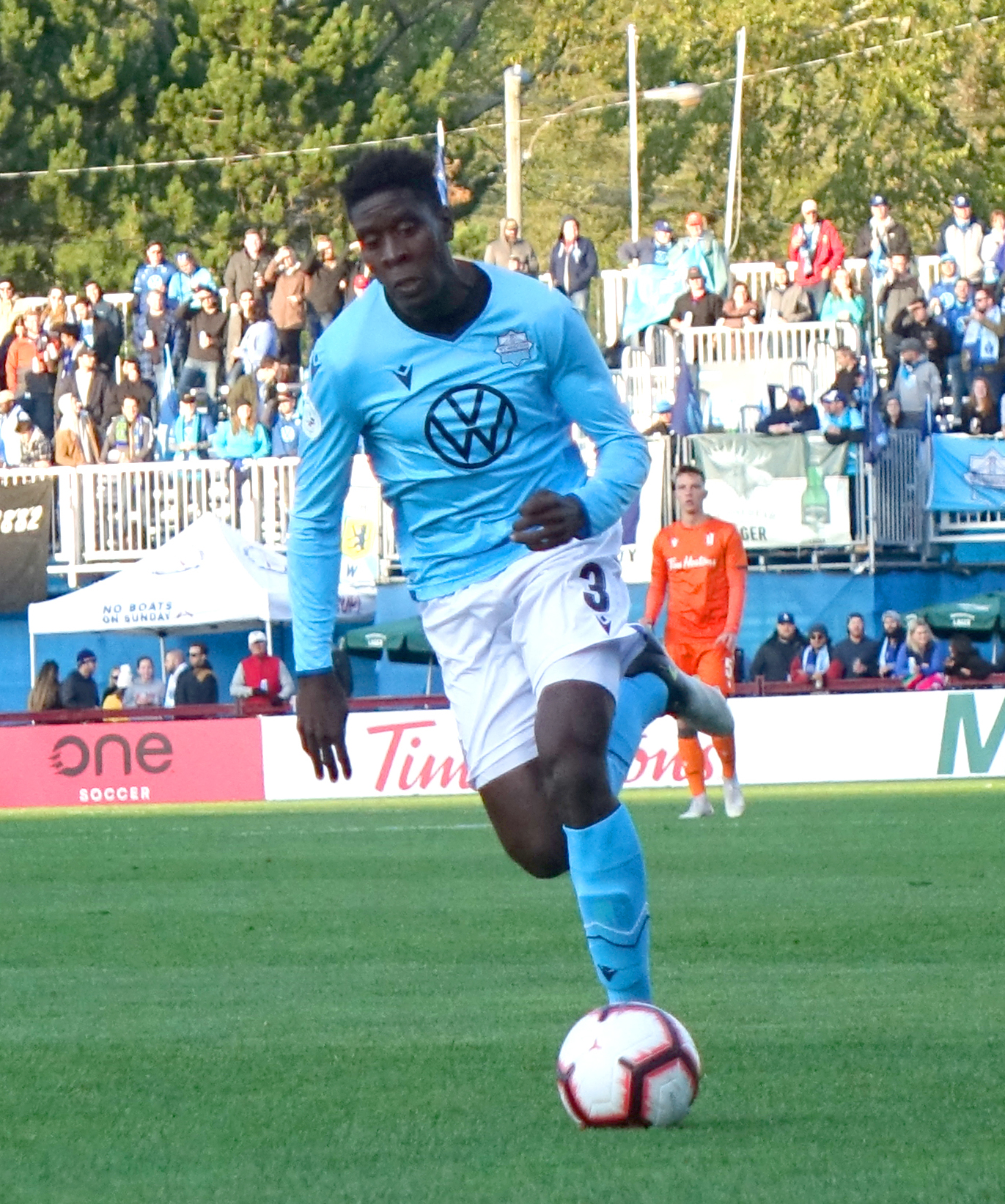
- Bona playing for HFX Wanderers in 2019

Personal information
- Full name: André Gregory Bona
- Date of birth: 19 January 1990 (age 36)
- Place of birth: Marseille, France
- Height: 1.88 m (6 ft 2 in)
- Position: Defender

Youth career
- AS Afro–Antillais
- SO Caillolais
- Marseille

College career
Years	Team	Apps	(Gls)
2014–2018	UQAM Citadins		

Senior career*
Years	Team	Apps	(Gls)
2017–2018	CS Longueuil	21	(3)
2019	HFX Wanderers	25	(1)
- * Club domestic league appearances and goals as of 19 October 2019

André Gregory Bona (born 19 January 1990) is a French professional footballer who plays as a defender.

== Club career ==
=== Early career ===
Bona began playing football at age five with local club Afro–Antillais before switching to S.O. Caillolais. At age thirteen, he joined the academy of Ligue 1 side Olympique de Marseille but ultimately left to focus on sprinting. After six years competing at the national level in the 60m, 100m and 200m, Bona returned to football at the senior amateur level. In 2014, he received offers from clubs in the Championnat National 2 and Championnat National 3, but opted to pursue an education overseas in Canada instead.

From 2014 to 2018 Bona attended the Université du Québec à Montréal, where he studied environmental science. In 2017, he signed with local PLSQ side CS Longueuil and made nine league appearances that season. The following year, he made another twelve league appearances for Longueuil, scoring three goals.

=== HFX Wanderers ===
On 12 November 2018, Bona was selected in the second round of the CPL–U Sports Draft, 10th overall, by the HFX Wanderers. On 29 March 2019, Bona officially signed with Wanderers and made his Canadian Premier League debut on 28 April 2019 as a substitute in the club's inaugural match.

André Bona scored his first goal for Halifax in the round Two in the Canadian Championship in Winnipeg against Valour FC on 12 June 2019. During injury time the defender countered Valour FC off a corner and demonstrated his pace by sprinting and scoring on an open net, sealing a 2-0 win at Investors Group Field stadium. On 14 December 2019, the club announced that Bona would not return for the 2020 season.
