= Akeem García =

Trinidadian football coach & player (born 1996)

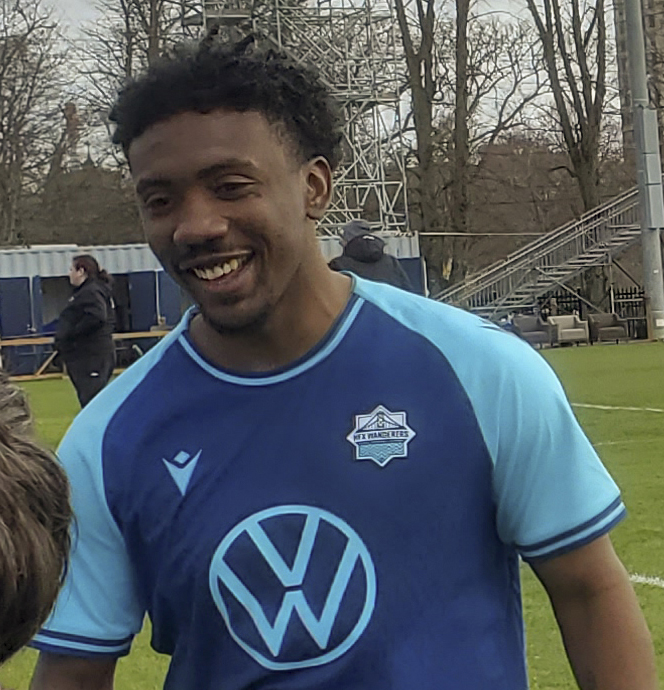
- García with HFX Wanderers FC in 2022

Personal information
- Full name: Akeem Ancil García
- Date of birth: 9 November 1996 (age 30)
- Place of birth: Chaguanas, Trinidad and Tobago
- Height: 1.68 m (5 ft 6 in)
- Position: Forward

Youth career
- Arima Ball Masters

Senior career*
Years	Team	Apps	(Gls)
2013–2014	San Juan Jabloteh		
2014–2017	W Connection		(5)
2017	North East Stars	12	(4)
2018	Santa Rosa	16	(5)
2019–2022	HFX Wanderers	68	(19)

International career^{‡}
2011–2013	Trinidad and Tobago U17	6	(2)
2012–2015	Trinidad and Tobago U20	10	(0)
2015–	Trinidad and Tobago	3	(0)
- * Club domestic league appearances and goals as of 9 October 2022 ‡ National team caps and goals as of 14 October 2019

Akeem Ancil García (born 9 November 1996) is a Trinidadian football coach and player.

== Club career ==
=== Early career ===
García began playing football at age six with local club Arima Ball Masters. At age 17, García signed for TT Pro League side San Juan Jabloteh.

=== W Connection ===
In 2014, García signed with W Connection, scoring five goals in two league appearances that season. He received great recognition for his play that year and earned his first senior national team call-up in early 2015. Later that year during tryouts for the Trinidad and Tobago U23 team, García tore his ACL and after undergoing surgery missed a total of twelve months while recovering.

=== North East Stars ===
In 2017, García signed for his hometown club, North East Stars. He went on to score four goals in twelve league appearances that season as North East Stars won the TT Pro League, García's first league title. García also added another seven goals in other competitions that year.

=== Santa Rosa ===
In 2018, García followed North East Stars manager Derek King to TT Super League side Santa Rosa. That season, he scored five goals in sixteen league appearances and ten goals in all competitions as Santa Rosa won the league title. After the end of the season, García spent two weeks on trial with Mexican Ascenso MX side Celaya.

=== HFX Wanderers ===
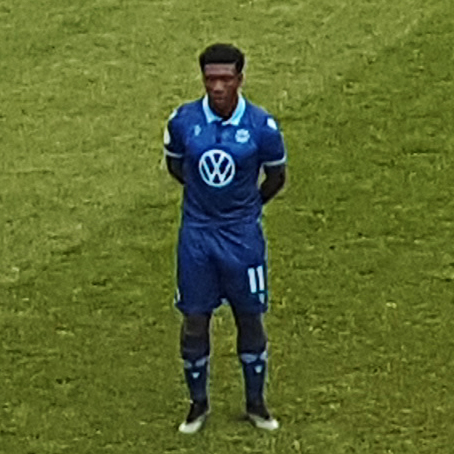
García with the Wanderers in 2019

==== 2019 ====
On 10 January 2019, García signed with Canadian Premier League side HFX Wanderers, where Derek King had signed as an assistant manager. García scored the first goal in Wanderers history in the team's home opener on 4 May 2019. García finished the season with a team-leading seven league goals in 24 appearances, tying for seventh among the league's top scorers. On 7 November 2019, García re-signed with Halifax for the 2020 season.

==== 2020 ====
García excelled in the shortened 2020 Canadian Premier League season. He was a major part of Halifax's drastic turnaround from their previous last place finish, and the Wanderers made it all the way to the final, where they were defeated by Forge FC. In total, García scored six goals in 10 matches, winning the Golden Boot. On 3 November 2020, García re-signed with Halifax for the 2021 season.

==== 2021 ====
García struggled to maintain his form from the previous season, managing to only score 2 goals in 22 appearances. The team as a whole was also unable to match their performance from 2020 and finished sixth in the league. However, the forward was re-signed for the following season, as well.

==== 2022 ====
During the 2022 CPL season, due to the ACL injury occurred to João Morelli, García once again became the team's main attacking choice, together with Samuel Salter. He ended the year with four goals in 13 appearances, as the Wanderers finished second-to-last in the league table, missing out on the Finals for the second consecutive time.

At the end of the season, Halifax announced that García would put his playing career on hold, in order to work as a coach at a local grassroots club in Nova Scotia.

== International career ==
=== Youth ===
García received his first youth call-up for Trinidad and Tobago as a 14 year-old at the 2011 CONCACAF U-17 Championship, but did not appear in the tournament. García was called up again in the following U17 cycle and played in all three matches of the Caribbean qualifying tournament for the 2013 CONCACAF U-17 Championship, scoring goals against the British Virgin Islands and Suriname. After Trinidad and Tobago qualified, García was called up again for the finals tournament, appearing in all three matches for Trinidad and Tobago against Canada, Costa Rica and the quarter-final loss to Panama.

As a 15 year-old, García first represented his country at the under-20 level in qualifying for the 2013 CONCACAF U-20 Championship, making five appearances as Trinidad and Tobago ultimately failed to qualify. García was also eligible for the following U20 cycle and appeared in all five matches for Trinidad and Tobago at the 2015 CONCACAF U-20 Championship.

García attended trials for the Trinidad and Tobago U23 team ahead of the Caribbean qualifying tournament for the 2015 CONCACAF Men's Olympic Qualifying Championship, but missed the tournament after tearing his ACL.

=== Senior ===
García earned his first cap for the Trinidad and Tobago senior national team on 27 March 2015 in a friendly against Panama. He played the final 26 minutes of the match in a 0–1 loss.

Following strong performances in the Canadian Premier League, on 4 October 2019 García was recalled to the national side for a CONCACAF Nations League match against Honduras on 10 October and a friendly against Venezuela on 14 October.

== Personal life ==
García was born in Chaguanas and grew up in the Calvary area of Arima.

== Career statistics ==
As of 9 October 2022

Club statistics
Club	Season	League			National Cup (Note: Includes appearances in the Canadian Championship.)		Other		Total	
Club	Season	Division	Apps	Goals	Apps	Goals	Apps	Goals	Apps	Goals
W Connection	2014–15	TT Pro League	2	5	0	0	0	0	2	5
North East Stars	2017	TT Pro League	12	4	?	0	?	7	12	11
Santa Rosa	2018	TT Super League	16	5	—		?	5	16	10
HFX Wanderers	2019	Canadian Premier League	24	7	4	1	—		28	8
HFX Wanderers	2020	Canadian Premier League	9	6	0	0	1	0	10	6
HFX Wanderers	2021	Canadian Premier League	22	2	2	0	—		24	2
HFX Wanderers	2022	Canadian Premier League	13	4	2	1	—		15	5
HFX Wanderers	Total		68	19	8	2	1	0	77	21
Career total			98	33	8	2	1	0	107	35

== Honours ==
=== Club ===
W Connection

- Trinidad and Tobago Charity Shield: 2014

North East Stars

- TT Pro League: 2017

Santa Rosa

- TT Super League: 2018

HFX Wanderers

- Canadian Premier League
  - Runners-up: 2020

=== Individual ===
- Canadian Premier League Golden Boot: 2020
