= Abd-El-Aziz Yousef =

Saudi-Somali footballer (born 1999)

Personal information
- Full name: Abd-El-Aziz Safimayo Yousef
- Date of birth: 5 October 1999 (age 27)
- Place of birth: Saudi Arabia
- Height: 1.80 m (5 ft 11 in)
- Position: Winger

Team information
- Current team: Victoria Highlanders FC
- Number: 13

Youth career
- Blaise Academy

Senior career*
| Years | Team | Apps | (Gls) |
| 2019 | HFX Wanderers | 0 | (0) |
| 2022 | Rivers FC | | |
| 2023– | Victoria Highlanders FC | 5 | (1) |

International career^{‡}
| 2019– | Somalia | 6 | (0) |
- * Club domestic league appearances and goals as of 16 July 2023 ‡ National team caps and goals as of 15 December 2019

Abd-El-Aziz Safimayo Yousef (Somali: Cabdicasiis Yuusuf; born 5 October 1999) is a professional footballer who plays as a winger for Victoria Highlanders FC in League1 British Columbia. Born in Saudi Arabia, he represents the Somalia national team.

== Early life ==
Yousef was born in Saudi Arabia, to Somali parents, and moved to Vancouver at an early age. Prior to signing with Wanderers, Yousef was a trialist for the youth programme of Dutch Eerste Divisie side Cambuur.

== Club career ==
On 9 April 2019, Yousef signed with Canadian Premier League side HFX Wanderers. After not playing a single match throughout the 2019 season, On December 14, the club announced that Yousef would not be returning for 2020.

In May 2022, he signed with Rivers FC in League1 British Columbia.

In May 2023, he joined Victoria Highlanders FC in League1 British Columbia.

== International career ==
Yousef was called up to the Somalia national team for a pair of 2022 FIFA World Cup qualifying matches against Zimbabwe on August 25, 2019. He made his debut for the Ocean Stars in the first match in Djibouti on September 5 which ended in a 1–0 victory. This result also was the first ever win in World Cup qualifying for Somalia in the nation's history. In December 2019 Yousef was called up for the 2019 CECAFA Cup, where he started four matches as Somalia was eliminated in the group stage.
