= Andre Rampersad =

Trinidadian footballer (born 1995)

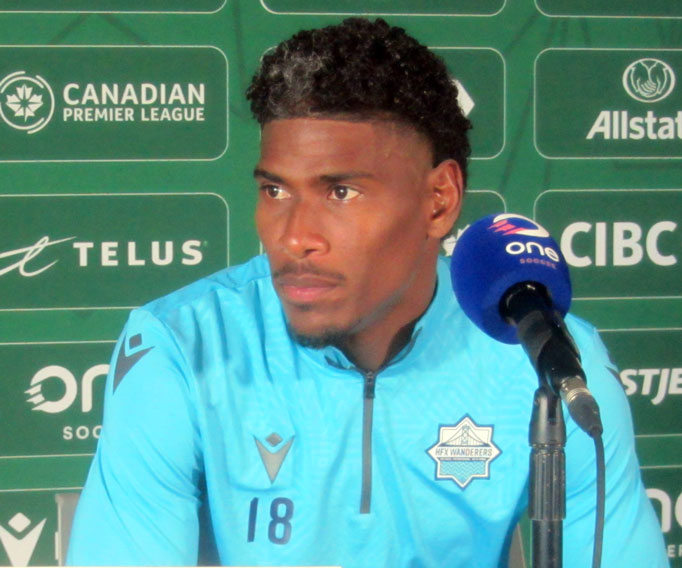
- Rampersad with HFX Wanderers in 2024

Personal information
- Full name: Andre Jesse Rampersad
- Date of birth: 2 February 1995 (age 31)
- Place of birth: Arima, Trinidad and Tobago
- Height: 1.85 m (6 ft 1 in)
- Position: Midfielder

Team information
- Current team: HFX Wanderers
- Number: 18

Youth career
- Santa Rosa

Senior career*
Years	Team	Apps	(Gls)
2013–2018	Santa Rosa		
2019–	HFX Wanderers	167	(4)

International career^{‡}
2023–	Trinidad and Tobago	38	(1)
- * Club domestic league appearances and goals as of November 5, 2026 ‡ National team caps and goals as of October 8, 2026

Andre Jesse Rampersad (born 2 February 1995) is a Trinidadian professional footballer who plays as a midfielder. He plays for Canadian club HFX Wanderers, where he serves as captain and is nicknamed "Mr. Halifax", and the Trinidad and Tobago national team.

== Early life ==
Rampersad grew up in the La Horquetta neighbourhood of Arima, Trinidad and Tobago. In his youth, he mainly played cricket, before switching to a focus on football at age 12, where he joined the academy of local club FC Santa Rosa. In 2012, he was named Most Promising Player of the Super League U17 division.

== Club career ==
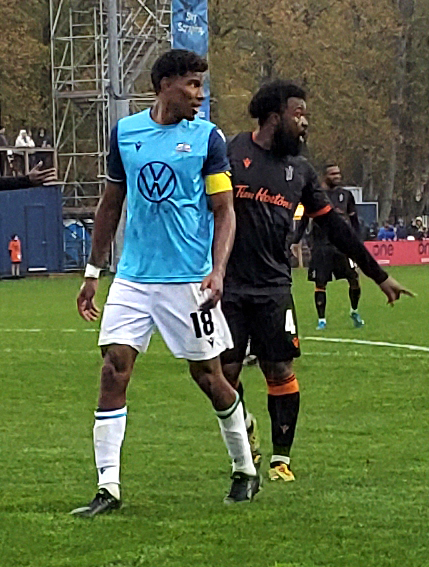
Rampersad with HFX Wanderers in 2021

He began playing at the senior level with FC Santa Rosa, in the second tier TT Super League, when he was 18. He won the 2018 TT Super League title with the team. While playing with Santa Rosa, he was scouted by future coach and fellow Trinidadian Stephen Hart in 2018.

In January 2019, he signed with Canadian Premier League club HFX Wanderers. On 28 April 2019, Rampersad made his professional debut as a starter in the Wanderers' inaugural match. On 20 June 2019, he scored his first goal for the club in a 2–1 loss to Cavalry FC. Following the season, he re-signed with the club for the 2020 season. Ahead of that season, which was delayed due to the COVID-19 pandemic, he was named team captain (he had also been given the armband for the team's final match of the 2019 season).

At the end of the 2020 season, he was named to the CPL Best XI. During the 2021 season, he became the team's most capped player. After the 2021 season, he was ranked as the #38 best player in the history of the CPL.

On 5 September 2022, he played his 100th match, across all competitions (including friendlies), for the Wanderers. He was regularly named to the CPL Team of the Week in 2022. In December 2022, he signed a multi-year extension with the club.

On 22 April 2023, Rampersad became Halifax's first player to make 100 competitive appearances for the club, having featured in a 1–1 league draw against Forge FC. As of the 2023 season, he is the all-time appearance leader for the club. In January 2025, Rampersad signed a 2-year contract extension through the 2026 season, with an option for 2027.

== International career ==
In May 2021, Rampersad was invited to a Trinidad and Tobago training camp, but due to travel restrictions in Canada surrounding the COVID-19 pandemic, he was unable to join the squad.

In March 2023, Rampersad received another call-up to Trinidad ahead of CONCACAF Nations League matches against the Bahamas and Nicaragua. This marked his first time with the national team at any level. On March 24, he made his international debut as a starter against the Bahamas.

In June 2023, he was named to the final squad for the 2023 CONCACAF Gold Cup. In Trinidad and Tobago's second group-stage match against Jamaica, Rampersad scored his first goal for his country, in a 4–1 defeat.

== Career statistics ==
As of November 5, 2026

Club statistics
Club	Season	League			Playoffs		National Cup		Total	
Club	Season	Division	Apps	Goals	Apps	Goals	Apps	Goals	Apps	Goals
Santa Rosa	2013–14	National Super League	?	1	—		?	?	?	1
Santa Rosa	2014–15	National Super League	?	2	—		?	?	?	2
Santa Rosa	2018	TT Super League	18	3	—		?	?	18	3
Santa Rosa	Total		18	6	0	0	0	0	18	6
HFX Wanderers	2019	Canadian Premier League	25	1	—		5	0	30	1
HFX Wanderers	2020	Canadian Premier League	10	0	1	0	—		11	0
HFX Wanderers	2021	Canadian Premier League	27	0	—		2	0	29	0
HFX Wanderers	2022	Canadian Premier League	25	0	—		2	0	27	0
HFX Wanderers	2023	Canadian Premier League	19	0	0	0	1	0	20	0
HFX Wanderers	2024	Canadian Premier League	22	2	—		1	0	23	2
HFX Wanderers	2025	Canadian Premier League	18	0	1	0	1	0	16	0
HFX Wanderers	2026	Canadian Premier League	21	1	0	0	0	0	21	1
HFX Wanderers	Total		167	4	2	0	12	0	181	4
Career total			185	10	1	0	12	0	201	10

List of international goals scored by Andre Rampersad
No.	Date	Venue	Opponent	Score	Result	Competition
1	28 June 2023	CityPark, St. Louis, United States	Jamaica	1–3	1–4	2023 CONCACAF Gold Cup
