= Kodai Iida =

Japanese footballer

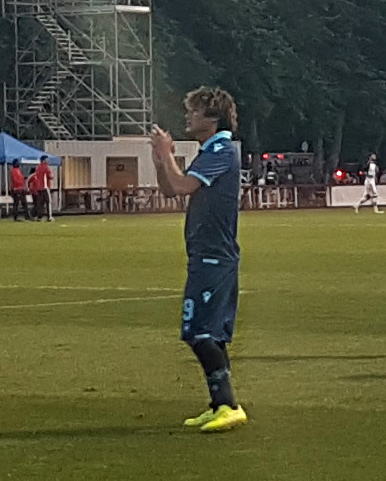
- Iida playing for HFX Wanderers in 2019

Personal information
- Full name: Kodai Iida
- Date of birth: 6 December 1994 (age 31)
- Place of birth: Ishikawa, Japan
- Height: 1.72 m (5 ft 8 in)
- Position: Midfielder

Team information
- Current team: Lipno Stęszew
- Number: 2

Youth career
- 2010–2012: Hokuriku High School

College career
Years	Team	Apps	(Gls)
2013–2016	Yamanashi Gakuin University		

Senior career*
Years	Team	Apps	(Gls)
2015–2017	Kitsap SC		
2016–2017	Clarkstown Eagles	6	(3)
2017–2018	Washington Premier	10	(4)
2019	HFX Wanderers	20	(1)
2019–2021	OKC Energy	23	(0)
2022	RANS Nusantara	0	(0)
2022–2023	Preston Lions		
2023–2024	Sheikh Russel KC	11	(1)
2025	Meshakhte		
2025–	Lipno Stęszew	24	(1)
- * Club domestic league appearances and goals as of 22:31, 3 June 2026 (UTC)

Kodai Iida (飯田 昴大, Iida Kodai; born 6 December 1994) is a Japanese professional footballer who plays as a midfielder for Polish III liga club Lipno Stęszew.

== Club career ==
=== Early career ===
Iida played football at Yamanashi Gakuin University in Kōfu, Yamanashi Prefecture before moving to the United States to pursue a professional career as a footballer.

=== Kitsap ===
In April 2017, Iida signed with National Premier Soccer League side Kitsap SC after a trial period.

=== Clarkstown Eagles ===
Later in 2017, Iida signed for NPSL side Clarkstown Eagles, scoring three goals in six appearances as the club would go on to make the playoffs.

=== Washington Premier ===
In 2018, Iida played for American Evergreen Premier League side Washington Premier FC, scoring four goals in ten appearances and leading the club to a league title.

=== HFX Wanderers ===
In September 2018, Iida participated in the Canadian Premier League Open Trials and was named one of the top players from the Montreal trials by the league's coaches. On 21 February 2019, Iida signed his first professional contract with Canadian Premier League side HFX Wanderers. He made his debut as a substitute in Halifax's inaugural match on 28 April 2019. On 14 December 2019, the club announced that Iida would not be returning for the 2020 season.

=== OKC Energy FC ===
Iida signed with OKC Energy FC of the USL Championship in December 2019. He was the first Asian-born player signed by Energy FC.

=== RANS Nusantara ===
In May 2022, Iida signed for Liga 1 club RANS Nusantara following their promotion to the top tier of Indonesian football.

=== Sheikh Russel KC ===
In August 2023, Iida joined Sheikh Russel KC in the Bangladesh Premier League.

== Honours ==
Washington Premier

- Evergreen Premier League: 2018
