= Christian Oxner =

Canadian soccer player

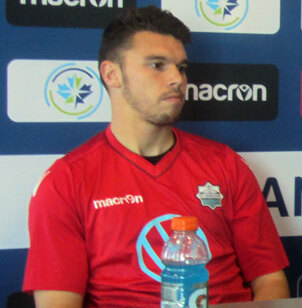
- Oxner with HFX Wanderers in 2019

Personal information
- Date of birth: July 29, 1996 (age 30)
- Place of birth: Halifax, Nova Scotia, Canada
- Height: 1.83 m (6 ft 0 in)
- Position: Goalkeeper

Youth career
- Halifax Dunbrack

College career
Years	Team	Apps	(Gls)
2014–2018	Saint Mary's Huskies	33	(0)

Senior career*
Years	Team	Apps	(Gls)
2019–2022	HFX Wanderers	60	(0)
- * Club domestic league appearances and goals as of October 9, 2022

Christian Oxner (born July 29, 1996) is a Canadian soccer player.

== Club career ==
=== Early career ===
Oxner was born in Halifax and grew up in the suburb of Clayton Park. Oxner began playing soccer with the U6 programme of local club Halifax Dunbrack.

=== Western Halifax ===
While attending Saint Mary's University, Oxner played for local Nova Scotia Soccer League amateur side Western Halifax FC during the summer. In 2016, he won his first provincial championship with Western Halifax and competed at his first national championships that fall.

In 2017, Oxner won a second provincial title in a row Western Halifax and went on to win the Challenge Trophy that year. Oxner kept a clean sheet in the final against FC Winnipeg Lions as Western Halifax won 1–0, becoming the first Nova Scotia club to win the competition since in 2001. In 2018, Oxner helped Western Halifax to a third consecutive Nova Scotian title.

=== HFX Wanderers ===
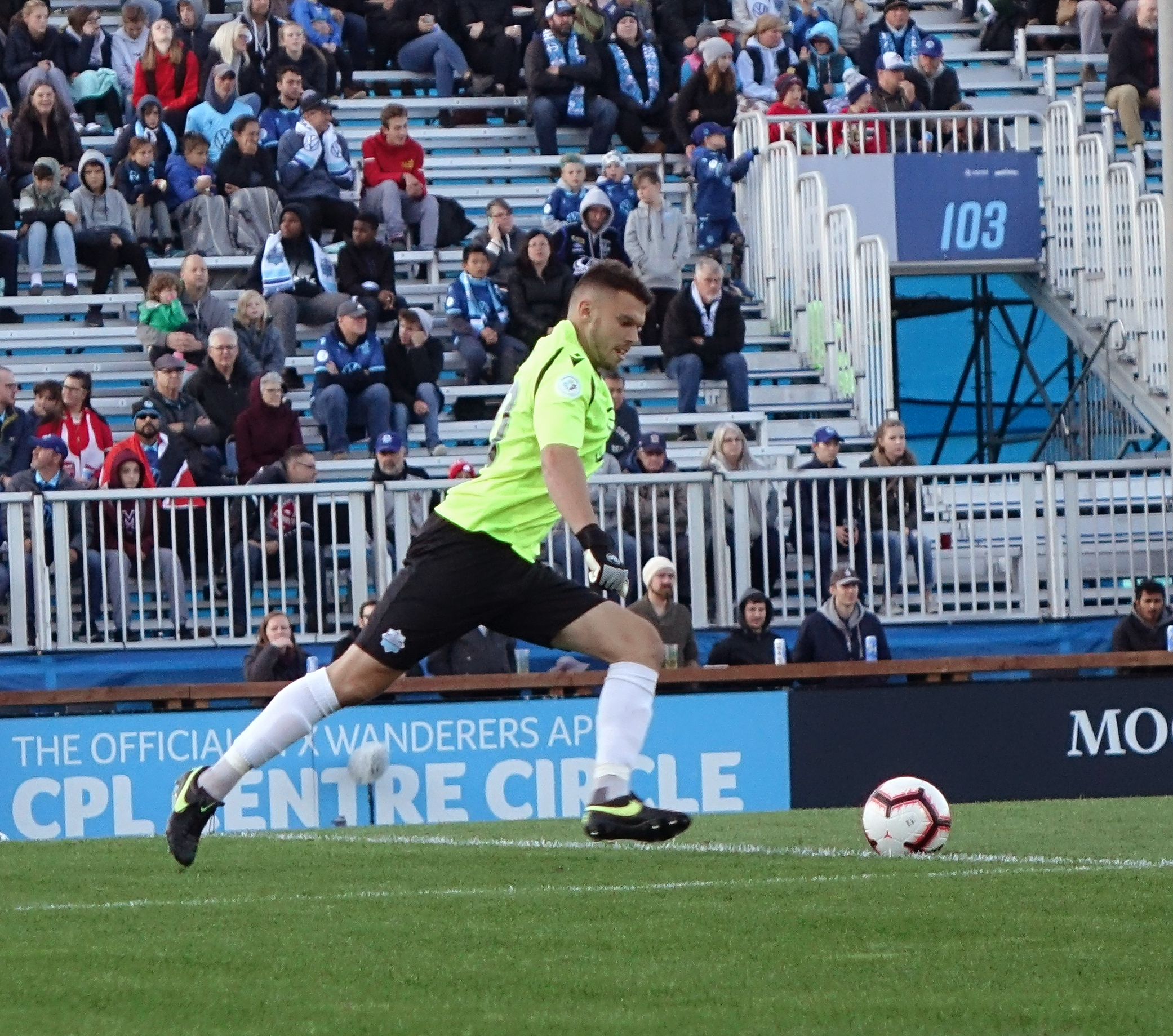
Oxner with HFX Wanderers in 2019

On November 12, 2018, Oxner was drafted in the third round, nineteenth overall, in the 2018 CPL–U Sports Draft by local club HFX Wanderers. On February 20, 2019 Oxner signed his first professional contract with Wanderers, becoming the second-ever Nova Scotian to sign for the club. He made his professional debut in a Canadian Championship match against Vaughan Azzurri on May 16. On May 25, 2019 he made his league debut against Cavalry FC. After starting the season as a back-up to veteran Trinidad and Tobago international Jan-Michael Williams, Oxner slowly earned himself the spot as Wanderers' starting keeper and went on to make eighteen league appearances that season. On November 5, 2019 Oxner re-signed with Halifax for the 2020 season. In the 2020 season, Oxner would be named a finalist for the league's best goalkeeper. In November 2020, Oxner would re-sign with the Wanderers for the 2021 and 2022 seasons, with a club option for the 2023 season. In December 2022 HFX announced they had declined Oxner's 2023 option, ending his time with the club.

== Career statistics ==
=== Club ===
As of October 9, 2022

Club	League	Season	League		Playoffs		Cup		Total	
Club	League	Season	Apps	Goals	Apps	Goals	Apps	Goals	Apps	Goals
HFX Wanderers FC	CPL	2019	18	0	—		3	0	21	0
HFX Wanderers FC	CPL	2020	6	0	1	0	—		7	0
HFX Wanderers FC	CPL	2021	18	0	—		0	0	18	0
HFX Wanderers FC	CPL	2022	18	0	—		2	0	20	0
Career total			60	0	1	0	5	0	66	0

== Honours ==
Western Halifax

- Nova Scotia Soccer League: 2016, 2017, 2018
- Challenge Trophy: 2017

HFX Wanderers

- Canadian Premier League
  - Runners-up: 2020
