= Luis Alberto Perea =

Colombian footballer (born 1986)

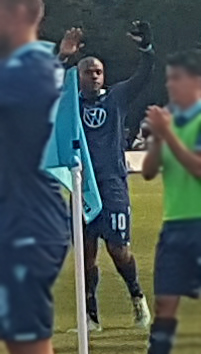
- Perea playing for HFX Wanderers in 2019

Personal information
- Full name: Luis Alberto Perea Pérez
- Date of birth: 3 September 1986 (age 40)
- Place of birth: Medellín, Colombia
- Height: 1.85 m (6 ft 1 in)
- Position: Striker

Team information
- Current team: FAS

Senior career*
Years	Team	Apps	(Gls)
2006–2009	Atlético Nacional	6	(0)
2007	→ La Equidad (loan)		
2007	→ Llaneros (loan)		
2008	→ Real Cartagena (loan)		
2009–2011	Deportes Tolima	6	(0)
2010	→ León de Huánuco (loan)	40	(22)
2011	Deportivo Quito	12	(1)
2011	→ Everton Viña (loan)	19	(6)
2012	Universidad San Martín	0	(0)
2012	FC Dallas	2	(0)
2012–2014	Universidad San Martín	92	(36)
2015	Criciúma	3	(0)
2015–2016	Sport Huancayo	14	(3)
2016	Universidad César Vallejo	10	(1)
2016–2017	Sport Huancayo	5	(0)
2017	Sport Rosario	12	(1)
2017	Orsomarso	1	(0)
2018	FAS	20	(15)
2018	La Equidad	5	(1)
2019	HFX Wanderers	15	(3)
2020	Carlos Stein	5	(1)
2020–2021	FAS	30	(4)
2022	Santos de Nasca	20	(3)
Total		286	(93)
- * Club domestic league appearances and goals as of 30 May 2021

Luis Alberto Perea Pérez (born 3 September 1986) is a Colombian former professional footballer.

== Career ==
=== Early career ===
Perea moved with his father to Miami, Florida from Colombia at age 12 and attended Miami Sunset High School. He graduated in 2004, while winning a state title and being selected to the All-State team that same year.

He made his professional debut with Atlético Nacional in 2006, aged 19. For the 2007-I season, he was loaned out to La Equidad, and for the second half of the 2007 season, he played with Llaneros. In the 2008 season he was loaned out again, this time to Real Cartagena. At the conclusion of the 2009 Apertura, he left Nacional.

In the 2009 Clausura, he joined Deportes Tolima. For the 2010 season he was loaned out to Peruvian club León de Huánuco. On 29 August, he scored a hat trick in a 5–2 victory against Sport Huancayo. Perea had an excellent 2010 season, playing 42 matches and scoring 23 goals as his club qualified for the 2011 Copa Libertadores.

=== Univ. San Martín ===
In late 2011, Perea signed with Peruvian Primera División side Universidad San Martín de Porres ahead of the 2012 season. On 20 February 2012, after Perea and several other San Martín players went on strike, the club announced it would not participate in the upcoming season and that the contracts of its players would be terminated.

=== FC Dallas ===
On 13 March 2012, Perea returned to the United States and signed with Major League Soccer side FC Dallas. Perea made two appearances for Dallas before he and the club agreed to the mutual termination of his contract on 4 April.

=== Return to San Martín ===
After leaving FC Dallas, Perea re-signed with Universidad San Martín, which had resumed operations in time to participate in the new season. On 14 April 2012, Perea made an exceptional debut for San Martín, scoring a hat-trick after coming on as a half-time substitute in a 5–1 win over Juan Aurich. He went on to score 11 goals in 29 appearances that season, including 20 starts.

In 2013, Perea scored 14 goals for San Martín in 36 appearances, including 29 starts.

In 2014, Perea scored 11 goals in 27 appearances in league play, including 24 starts. He was also instrumental in San Martín's run to the finals of the Copa Inca that year, becoming the competition's top scorer with 12 goals in 14 appearances. This included a second-half injury time penalty which turned out to be the decisive goal in a 3–1 comeback win over Melgar, a win that clinched San Martín's place in the final. In the final against Alianza Lima Perea scored the opening goal, a 16th-minute penalty, before being sent off in the 40th minute for a second yellow card. Alianza went on to win the match on penalties.

=== Orsomarso ===
On 17 September 2017, Perea made one appearance for Colombian Primera B club Orsomarso, playing 90 minutes in a 1–1 draw against Valledupar.

=== FAS ===
On 30 December 2017, Perea signed with Salvadoran Primera División side FAS. On 3 February 2018, Perea scored his first goal for FAS, a 25th-minute penalty in a 1–0 win over Dragón. The following week, he notched his first goal from open play against defending Apertura champions Alianza.

Perea finished the season as top scorer of the 2018 Clausura with 14 goals in 18 appearances, and scored another goal in FAS's playoff series against Audaz.

=== La Equidad ===
In June 2018 Perea returned to Colombia, signing with Categoría Primera A club La Equidad.

=== HFX Wanderers ===
On 25 February 2019, Perea signed with Canadian Premier League side HFX Wanderers. He made his debut in the Wanderer's home opener against Forge FC on May 4, 2019. He scored his first goal in the same match, the match winner in a 2–1 victory. On 14 December 2019, the club announced that Perea would not be returning for the 2020 season.

=== Carlos Stein ===
On 30 December 2019, Perea joined newly promoted Peruvian Primera División side Carlos Stein. He made five appearances that season, scoring one goal.

=== Return to FAS ===
In April 2020, Perea returned to FAS for the 2020 Apertura season. He made his return debut on 25 October 2020 in a 0–0 draw against Once Deportivo.

== Personal life ==
Perea is the son of Luis Carlos Perea, a professional footballer who played in Categoría Primera A and the Mexican Primera División as well as for the Colombia national team.

== Career statistics ==
As of 22 November 2020

Club statistics
Club	Season	League			National Cup (Note: Includes the Torneo del Inca, Copa Colombia and Canadian Championship.)		Continental (Note: Includes the Copa Libertadores and Copa Sudamericana.)		Other (Note: Includes the Categoría Primera A Finalización Playoffs, Peruvian Primera División Play-off, Primera B de Chile Promotion Play-offs, Campeonato Catarinense and Salvadoran Primera División Clausura Playoffs.)		Total	
Club	Season	Division	Apps	Goals	Apps	Goals	Apps	Goals	Apps	Goals	Apps	Goals
Atlético Nacional	2009	Categoría Primera A	6	0	0	0	—		0	0	6	0
Deportes Tolima	2009	Categoría Primera A	6	0	0	0	—		1	0	7	0
León de Huánuco (loan)	2010	Peruvian Primera División	40	22	0	0	—		2	1	42	23
Deportivo Quito	2011	Ecuadorian Serie A	12	1	—		2	0	0	0	14	1
Everton Viña (loan)	2011	Primera B de Chile	19	6	0	0	—		2	0	21	6
FC Dallas	2012	Major League Soccer	2	0	0	0	—		0	0	2	0
Universidad San Martín	2012	Peruvian Primera División	29	11	—		0	0	0	0	16	3
Universidad San Martín	2013	Peruvian Primera División	36	14	—		—		0	0	36	14
Universidad San Martín	2014	Peruvian Primera División	27	11	14	12	—		0	0	41	23
Universidad San Martín	Total		92	36	14	12	0	0	0	0	106	48
Criciúma	2015	Brazilian Série B	0	0	0	0	—		3	0	3	0
Sport Huancayo	2015	Peruvian Primera División	14	3	0	0	—		0	0	14	3
Universidad César Vallejo	2016	Peruvian Primera División	10	1	—		1	0	0	0	11	1
Sport Huancayo	2016	Peruvian Primera División	5	0	—		2	0	0	0	7	0
Sport Rosario	2017	Peruvian Primera División	12	1	—		—		0	0	12	1
Orsomarso	2017	Categoría Primera B	1	0	0	0	—		0	0	1	0
FAS	2017–18	Salvadoran Primera División	18	14	—		—		2	1	20	15
La Equidad	2018	Categoría Primera A	4	1	1	0	—		1	0	6	1
HFX Wanderers	2019	Canadian Premier League	15	3	2	2	—		0	0	17	5
Carlos Stein	2020	Peruvian Primera División	5	1	0	0	—		0	0	5	1
FAS	2020–21	Salvadoran Primera División	5	1	—		0	0	0	0	5	1
Santos de Nasca	2022	Peruvian Segunda División	20	3	0	0	0	0	0	0	20	3
Career total			286	93	17	14	5	0	11	2	219	109

== Honours ==
=== Club ===
FAS

- Salvadoran Primera División: Clausura 2021

=== Individual ===
- Copa Inca Top Scorer: 2014
- Salvadoran Primera División Clausura Top Scorer: 2018
