= Jan-Michael Williams =

Trinidadian footballer (born 1984)

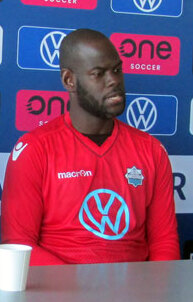
- Williams in 2019

Personal information
- Full name: Jan-Michael Grantley Williams
- Date of birth: 26 October 1984 (age 42)
- Place of birth: Couva, Trinidad and Tobago
- Height: 1.90 m (6 ft 3 in)
- Position: Goalkeeper

Team information
- Current team: HFX Wanderers (goalkeeper coach)

Youth career
- 2000: St Anthony's College
- 2001–2003: W Connection

Senior career*
Years	Team	Apps	(Gls)
2003–2007	W Connection		
2007–2008	White Star Woluwe	1	(0)
2008–2009	Ferencváros	9	(0)
2009	Athletic Club of BC	19	(0)
2010–2013	W Connection		
2013	St. Ann's Rangers		
2013–2017	Central FC		
2017	North East Stars		
2017–2018	Juticalpa	9	(0)
2018	Sacachispas	6	(0)
2019–2020	HFX Wanderers	12	(0)

International career
2001	Trinidad and Tobago U17	9	(0)
2003–2004	Trinidad and Tobago U20	13	(0)
2003–2017	Trinidad and Tobago	80	(0)
- * Club domestic league appearances and goals

Jan-Michael Grantley Williams (born 26 October 1984) is a Trinidadian football coach and former player who works as goalkeeper coach for HFX Wanderers. A former goalkeeper, he made 80 appearances for the Trinidad and Tobago national team and played professionally in Trinidad, Belgium, Hungary, Honduras, Guatemala and Canada.

== Club career ==
=== W Connection ===
Williams played for W Connection in Trinidad and Tobago and had trials with Rangers in 2003 alongside Kenwyne Jones. He was the Pro League Player of the Year in 2006 as well as the T & T Pro League Goalkeeper of the year in 2006.

On 27 March 2007, he was the first goalkeeper to score in a Pro Bowl game when he scored a header against United Petrotrin in injury time to send the tie into extra-time and penalties. He saved 2 penalties to send his team into the final of the 2007 Pro Bowl competition. The final, against Superstar Rangers also went to a penalty shoot-out when Williams saved another 2 penalties to help his team win the T&T Pro League Trophy.

With W Connection Williams has a T&T PFL Championship winners medal, earned in 2005 and a CFU Club Champions Cup winners medal, earned in 2006.

=== White Star Woluwe ===
Williams again left his country in June 2007 for trials with Hungarian club Újpest FC who offered him a contract but he delayed his decision in order to trial with Sheffield United. In July 2007, while on trial with Sheffield United, Williams played in a pre-season friendly against Alfreton Town. On 25 July 2007, he was offered a contract by Sheffield United. While waiting for his work permit, he signed a short-term contract with Belgian Third Division side White Star Woluwe.

=== Ferencváros ===
After he had his work permit application rejected, he signed a 1+1 year contract with Ferencváros on 15 July 2008. He played his first game for the green and white club against Sheffield United the previous day. Williams was in summer 2009 released rejoined W Connection.

Williams again left his country in August 2011 on trial with Belgian Third Division club ROCCM where he joined fellow T&T teammate Radanfah Abu Bakr.

=== Central FC ===
Williams signed with Trinidadian club Central FC for three years. He also played in the CONCACAF Champions League.

=== Juticalpa ===
In 2017 Williams moved to Hondurian First Division team Juticalpa where he played 9 games and spent another 21 in the bench.

=== Sacachispas ===
In the next couple of years Sacachispas, a Second Division team in Guatemala, was his team.

=== HFX Wanderers ===
Williams signed with HFX Wanderers on 10 January 2019. He was named the first ever captain of the squad, and made his debut against Pacific FC in the club's inaugural match on 28 April 2019. Williams suffered injury problems as the season went on, and partway through the season backup Christian Oxner took as the number one. He went on to make twelve league appearances that season and three in the Canadian Championship. Williams retired at the end of the season, but was hired on with the club as a goalkeeping coach.

On 11 August 2020, after an injury to Oxner, HFX announced Williams would come out of retirement temporarily to serve as back-up to Jason Beaulieu during the 2020 Canadian Premier League season.

== International career ==
Williams was selected as the second-choice goalkeeper for T&T at the 2001 FIFA Under 17 World Championship. He was also part of the 2003 Under-23 squad.

Williams was selected as the Trinidad and Tobago senior national team's number 1 for the 2007 CONCACAF Gold Cup where he played against El Salvador, Guatemala and United States.

== Coaching career ==
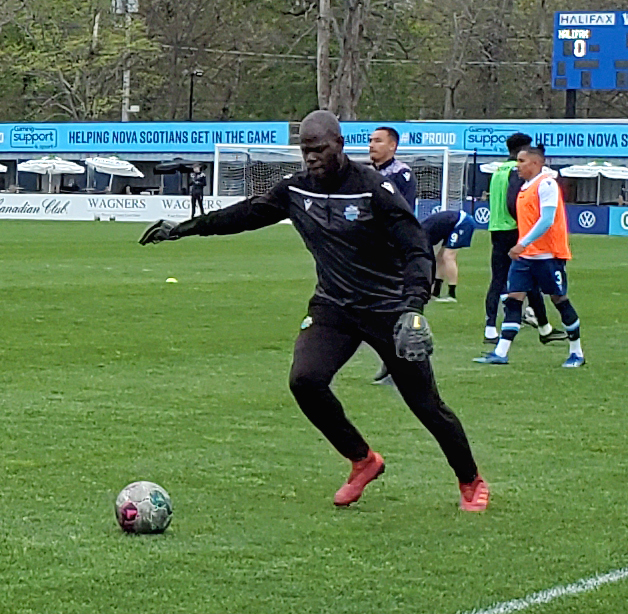
Williams as coach with HFX Wanderers in 2022

On 10 December 2019, Williams retired from playing and was appointed as the new goalkeeper coach for HFX Wanderers.
