= 2020 HFX Wanderers FC season =

HFX Wanderers
2020 season
- President: Derek Martin
- Head coach: Stephen Hart
- Stadium: Wanderers Grounds
- Canadian Premier League: Runners-up
- Canadian Championship: Did not qualify
- Top goalscorer: Akeem Garcia (6 goals)
| Home colours | Away colours |

The 2020 HFX Wanderers FC season was the second season in the club's history, as well as second season in Canadian Premier League history. The Wanderers were CPL runners-up, having been defeated by Forge FC in the 2020 CPL Final.

== Squad ==
As of July 31, 2020

| No. | Player | Nationality | Position(s) | Date of birth (age) | Previous club |
Goalkeepers
| 1 | Jason Beaulieu | (Canada) | GK | February 12, 1994 (aged 26) | (Canada) Montreal Impact |
| 50 | Christian Oxner | (Canada) | GK | July 29, 1996 (aged 24) | (Canada) Saint Mary's Huskies |
Defenders
| 2 | Peter Schaale | (Germany) | CB | June 14, 1996 (aged 24) | (Canada) CBU Capers |
| 3 | Jems Geffrard | (Haiti) | CB | August 26, 1994 (aged 26) | (United States) Fresno FC |
| 6 | Chrisnovic N'sa | (Canada) | CB / CM | January 28, 1999 (aged 21) | (Canada) Montreal Impact Academy |
| 13 | Daniel Kinumbe | (Canada) | LB | March 15, 1999 (aged 21) | (Canada) Montreal Impact |
| 14 | Mateo Restrepo | (Canada) | RB | April 29, 1997 (aged 23) | (United States) UC Santa Barbara Gauchos |
| 16 | Luke Green | (Canada) | CB | December 12, 2002 (aged 18) | (Canada) Suburban FC |
| 20 | Jake Ruby | (Canada) | RB | June 4, 2000 (aged 20) | (Canada) Trinity Western Spartans |
| 24 | Alex De Carolis | (Canada) | LB / CB | September 24, 1992 (aged 28) | (Sweden) Umeå FC |
| 31 | Eriks Santos (Note: Player is signed, but hasn't been added to the 2020 roster because of difficulties getting into Canada due to the COVID-19 pandemic) | (Brazil) | CB | February 23, 1996 (aged 24) | (Georgia (country)) Dila Gori |
Midfielders
| 5 | Louis Béland-Goyette | (Canada) | DM / CM | September 15, 1995 (aged 25) | (Canada) Valour FC |
| 8 | Omar Kreim | (Morocco) | MF | February 10, 1995 (aged 25) | (Canada) Montreal Carabins |
| 10 | Alessandro Riggi | (Canada) | LW / RW | November 30, 1993 (aged 27) | (United States) Phoenix Rising |
| 15 | Scott Firth | (Canada) | CM | March 2, 2001 (aged 19) | (Canada) Suburban FC |
| 17 | Aboubacar Sissoko | (Mali) | DM | October 9, 1995 (aged 25) | (Canada) Montreal Carabins |
| 18 | Andre Rampersad | (Trinidad and Tobago) | CM | February 2, 1995 (aged 25) | (Trinidad and Tobago) Santa Rosa |
| 22 | João Morelli | (Brazil) | AM | March 11, 1996 (aged 24) | (Estonia) FCI Levadia |
Forwards
| 7 | Alex Marshall | (Jamaica) | LW / CF | February 24, 1998 (aged 22) | (Jamaica) Cavalier |
| 9 | Ibrahima Sanoh | (Guinea) | CF | April 11, 1994 (aged 26) | (Canada) Holland College Hurricanes |
| 11 | Akeem Garcia | (Trinidad and Tobago) | CF / RW | September 11, 1996 (aged 24) | (Trinidad and Tobago) Santa Rosa |
| 23 | Cory Bent | (England) | LW / ST | May 14, 1997 (aged 23) | (Canada) CBU Capers |

== Transfers ==
=== In ===
| No. | Pos. | Player | Transferred from | Fee/notes | Date | Source |
|---|---|---|---|---|---|---|
| 8 | MF | (Morocco) Omar Kreim | (Canada) Montreal Carabins | Free transfer | November 28, 2019 | |
| 17 | MF | (Mali) Aboubacar Sissoko | (Canada) Montreal Carabins | Free transfer | November 28, 2019 | |
| 9 | FW | (Guinea) Ibrahima Sanoh | (Canada) Holland College Hurricanes | Free transfer | December 3, 2019 | |
| 2 | DF | (Germany) Peter Schaale | (Canada) CBU Capers | Free transfer | December 12, 2019 | |
| 10 | MF | (Canada) Alessandro Riggi | (United States) Phoenix Rising | Free transfer | December 18, 2019 | |
| 5 | MF | (Canada) Louis Béland-Goyette | (Canada) Valour FC | Free transfer | January 8, 2020 | |
| 13 | DF | (Canada) Daniel Kinumbe | (Canada) Montreal Impact | Free transfer | January 15, 2020 | |
| 14 | DF | (Canada) Mateo Restrepo | (United States) UC Santa Barbara Gauchos | Free transfer | January 22, 2020 | |
| 7 | MF | (Jamaica) Alex Marshall | (Jamaica) Cavalier | Free transfer | January 29, 2020 | |
| 1 | GK | (Canada) Jason Beaulieu | (Canada) Montreal Impact | Free transfer | February 6, 2020 | |
| 3 | DF | (Haiti) Jems Geffrard | (United States) Fresno FC | Free transfer | February 18, 2020 | |
| 31 | DF | (Brazil) Eriks Santos | (Georgia (country)) Dila Gori | Free transfer | February 25, 2020 | |
| 22 | MF | (Brazil) João Morelli | (Estonia) FCI Levadia | Free transfer | February 25, 2020 | |
| 23 | MF | (England) Cory Bent | (Canada) CBU Capers | Selected 1st overall in the 2019 CPL–U Sports Draft | May 4, 2020 | |
| 20 | DF | (Canada) Jake Ruby | (Canada) Trinity Western Spartans | Selected 14th overall in the 2019 CPL–U Sports Draft | July 31, 2020 | |
| 16 | DF | (Canada) Luke Green | (Canada) Suburban FC | Free transfer | July 31, 2020 | |

==== Draft picks ====
HFX Wanderers selected the following players in the 2019 CPL–U Sports Draft on November 11, 2019. Draft picks are not automatically signed to the team roster. Only those who are signed to a contract will be listed as transfers in.

| Round | Selection | Pos. | Player | Nationality | University |
|---|---|---|---|---|---|
| 1 | 1 | LW | Cory Bent | England | CBU Capers |
| 2 | 14 | RB | Jake Ruby | Canada | Trinity Western University |

=== Out ===
| No. | Pos. | Player | Transferred to | Fee/notes | Date | Source |
|---|---|---|---|---|---|---|
| 21 | GK | (Trinidad and Tobago) Jan-Michael Williams | Retired | | December 10, 2019 | |
| 23 | DF | (Canada) Matthew Arnone | (Canada) York9 FC | Contract expired | December 14, 2019 | |
| 3 | DF | (France) André Bona | | Contract expired | December 14, 2019 | |
| 7 | MF | (Peru) Juan Diego Gutiérrez | (Bolivia) Oriente Petrolero | Contract expired | December 14, 2019 | |
| 4 | DF | (Algeria) Chakib Hocine | (Canada) Valour FC | Contract expired | December 14, 2019 | |
| 9 | MF | (Japan) Kodai Iida | (United States) OKC Energy FC | Contract expired | December 14, 2019 | |
| 5 | MF | (Trinidad and Tobago) Elton John | | Contract expired | December 14, 2019 | |
| 12 | MF | (Guinea) Mohamed Kourouma | (Canada) Atlético Ottawa | Contract expired | December 14, 2019 | |
| 14 | FW | (Canada) Vincent Lamy | | Contract expired | December 14, 2019 | |
| 20 | DF | (Canada) Ndzemdzela Langwa | | Contract expired | December 14, 2019 | |
| 16 | DF | (Canada) Duran Lee | (Canada) FC Edmonton | Contract expired | December 14, 2019 | |
| 13 | MF | (Ivory Coast) Kouamé Ouattara | | Contract expired | December 14, 2019 | |
| 10 | FW | (Colombia) Luis Alberto Perea | (Peru) Carlos Stein | Contract expired | December 14, 2019 | |
| 8 | MF | (Canada) Elliot Simmons | (Canada) Cavalry FC | Contract expired | December 14, 2019 | |
| 17 | FW | (Canada) Tomasz Skublak | | Contract expired | December 14, 2019 | |
| 25 | DF | (Canada) Zachary Sukunda | (Finland) Ekenäs IF | Contract expired | December 14, 2019 | |
| 22 | MF | (Somalia) Abd-El-Aziz Yousef | | Contract expired | December 14, 2019 | |

== Canadian Premier League ==
Match times are Atlantic Daylight Time (UTC−3).

=== First stage ===
==== Table ====
| Pos | Team | Pld | W | D | L | GF | GA | GD | Pts | Qualification |
|---|---|---|---|---|---|---|---|---|---|---|
| 1 | Cavalry | 7 | 4 | 1 | 2 | 10 | 7 | +3 | 13 | Advance to group stage |
| 2 | HFX Wanderers | 7 | 3 | 3 | 1 | 12 | 7 | +5 | 12 (Note: Head-to-head points: HFX Wanderers 1, Forge 1. Goal differential: HFX Wanderers +5, Forge +4) | Advance to group stage |
| 3 | Forge | 7 | 3 | 3 | 1 | 13 | 9 | +4 | 12 | Advance to group stage |
| 4 | Pacific | 7 | 3 | 2 | 2 | 10 | 8 | +2 | 11 | Advance to group stage |
| 5 | York9 | 7 | 2 | 4 | 1 | 8 | 7 | +1 | 10 | |
| 6 | Valour | 7 | 2 | 2 | 3 | 8 | 9 | −1 | 8 (Note: Head-to-head points: Valour 3, Atlético Ottawa 0.) | |
| 7 | Atlético Ottawa | 7 | 2 | 2 | 3 | 7 | 12 | −5 | 8 | |
| 8 | FC Edmonton | 7 | 0 | 1 | 6 | 5 | 14 | −9 | 1 | |

Source: CanPL.ca
Rules for classification: 1) points; 2) head-to-head points; 3) goal differential; 4) goals for; 5) total wins; 6) U-21 minutes; 7) coin toss or drawing of lots.

==== Results by match ====
| Match | 1 | 2 | 3 | 4 | 5 | 6 | 7 |
|---|---|---|---|---|---|---|---|
| Result | D | D | L | W | D | W | W |
| Position | 3 | 4 | 5 | 4 | 6 | 4 | 2 |

Updated to match(es) played on September 6, 2020. Source: #Matches
W = Win; D = Draw; L = Loss

==== Matches ====
| August 15 1 | HFX Wanderers FC | 2–2 | Pacific FC | Charlottetown, Prince Edward Island |
| 4:00pm | Morelli 12' (pen.); Béland-Goyette (yellow card) 65'; Sanoh 86' (pen.) | Report | Haynes (yellow card) 44'; Baldisimo (yellow card) 66'; Verhoven 68'; Bustos 75' | Stadium: Alumni Field; Referee: Myriam Marcotte |

| August 19 2 | HFX Wanderers FC | 1–1 | Forge FC | Charlottetown, Prince Edward Island |
| 9:00pm | Beaulieu (yellow card) 15'; Béland-Goyette (yellow card) 44'; Garcia 47'; Schaale (yellow card) 90+4' | Report | Sabal 16' (pen.); Zajac (yellow card) 48'; Cela (yellow card) 90' | Stadium: Alumni Field; Referee: David Barrie |

| August 23 3 | Cavalry FC | 2–1 | HFX Wanderers FC | Charlottetown, Prince Edward Island |
| 9:00pm | Mavila 29'; Brown 90'; Wheeldon (yellow card) 90+2' | Report | Restrepo (yellow card) 72'; Schaale (yellow card) 85'; Garcia 90+3' (pen.) | Stadium: Alumni Field; Referee: Pierre-Luc Lauzière |

| August 26 4 | FC Edmonton | 1–3 | HFX Wanderers FC | Charlottetown, Prince Edward Island |
| 9:00pm | Esua (yellow card) 37'; Velado-Tsegaye 87' | Report | Garcia 35'; Morelli 45', 76'; Geffrard (yellow card) 64' | Stadium: Alumni Field; Referee: Filip Dujic |

| August 29 5 | HFX Wanderers FC | 1–1 | York9 FC | Charlottetown, Prince Edward Island |
| 4:00pm | Morelli (red card) 22'; Marshall (yellow card) 57'; Schaale (yellow card) 74'; Rampersad (yellow card) 86'; Kreim 91' | Report | Aparicio 21'; Segawa (yellow card) 35'; Telfer (yellow card) 61'; Gasparotto (yellow card) 64'; Di Chiara (yellow card) 86' | Stadium: Alumni Field; Referee: David Barrie |

| September 2 6 | Valour FC | 0–2 | HFX Wanderers FC | Charlottetown, Prince Edward Island |
| 2:00pm | Galán (yellow card) 35'; Levis (yellow card) 73' | Report | De Carolis 36' (yellow card) 67'; Bent 40'; Oxner (yellow card) 90+4' | Stadium: Alumni Field; Referee: Filip Dujic |

| September 6 7 | HFX Wanderers FC | 2–0 | Atlético Ottawa | Charlottetown, Prince Edward Island |
| 1:00pm | Garcia 15'; Riggi 60'; Béland-Goyette (yellow card) 81' | Report | McKendry (yellow card) 45+1' | Stadium: Alumni Field; Referee: Yusri Rudolf |

=== Group stage ===
==== Table ====
| Pos | Team | Pld | W | D | L | GF | GA | GD | Pts | Qualification |
|---|---|---|---|---|---|---|---|---|---|---|
| 1 | Forge | 3 | 2 | 1 | 0 | 4 | 1 | +3 | 7 | Advance to final |
| 2 | HFX Wanderers | 3 | 1 | 1 | 1 | 3 | 7 | −4 | 4 | Advance to final |
| 3 | Cavalry | 3 | 1 | 0 | 2 | 4 | 4 | 0 | 3 (Note: Head-to-head points: Cavalry 3, Pacific 0.) | |
| 4 | Pacific | 3 | 1 | 0 | 2 | 6 | 5 | +1 | 3 | |

Source: CanPL.ca
Rules for classification: 1) points; 2) head-to-head points; 3) goal differential; 4) goals for; 5) total wins; 6) U-21 minutes; 7) coin toss or drawing of lots.

==== Results by round ====
| Round | 1 | 2 | 3 |
|---|---|---|---|
| Result | D | W | L |
| Position | 2 | 2 | 2 |

Updated to match(es) played on September 15, 2020. Source: #Matches
W = Win; D = Draw; L = Loss

==== Matches ====
| September 9 1 | HFX Wanderers FC | 1–1 | Forge FC | Charlottetown, Prince Edward Island |
| 2:00pm | Garcia 2'; Ruby (yellow card) 56' | Report | Sabak (yellow card) 43', (goal) 56' (pen.); Edgar (yellow card) 71' | Stadium: Alumni Field; Referee: Myriam Marcotte |

| September 12 2 | Cavalry FC | 1–2 | HFX Wanderers FC | Charlottetown, Prince Edward Island |
| 4:00pm | Wheeldon (yellow card) 2' (yellow-red card) 11'; Carducci (yellow card) 40'; Córdova 80'; Mavila (yellow card) 83' | Report | Garcia 12' (pen.); Rampersad (yellow card) 30'; Morelli 41' (pen.); Oxner (yellow card) 90+4' | Stadium: Alumni Field; Referee: Mathieu Souaré |

| September 15 3 | HFX Wanderers FC | 0–5 | Pacific FC | Charlottetown, Prince Edward Island |
| 9:00 PM | | Report | Campbell 8'; Bustos 29'; Díaz 44'; Bustos 45+1'; Blasco 81'; Meilleur-Giguère (yellow card) 90' | Stadium: Alumni Field; Referee: Myriam Marcotte |

=== Final ===
| September 19 2020 CPL Final | Forge FC | 2–0 | HFX Wanderers FC | Charlottetown, Prince Edward Island |
| 3:00pm | Grant (yellow card) 58'; Achinioti-Jönsson 60'; Edgar (yellow card) 65'; Tissot 90' | Report | | Stadium: Alumni Field; Referee: Juan Marquez |

== Statistics ==
=== Squad and statistics ===
As of September 20, 2020

| No. | Pos | Nat | Player | Total | | Canadian Premier League | |
| No. | Pos | Nat | Player | Apps | Goals | Apps | Goals |
|---|---|---|---|---|---|---|---|
| 1 | GK | (Canada) CAN | Jason Beaulieu | 4 | 0 | 4+0 | 0 |
| 2 | DF | (Germany) GER | Peter Schaale | 10 | 0 | 10+0 | 0 |
| 3 | DF | (Haiti) HAI | Jems Geffrard | 11 | 0 | 11+0 | 0 |
| 5 | MF | (Canada) CAN | Louis Béland-Goyette | 10 | 0 | 7+3 | 0 |
| 6 | DF | (Canada) CAN | Chrisnovic N'sa | 9 | 0 | 8+1 | 0 |
| 7 | FW | (Jamaica) JAM | Alex Marshall | 11 | 0 | 5+6 | 0 |
| 8 | MF | (Morocco) MAR | Omar Kreim | 10 | 1 | 4+6 | 1 |
| 9 | FW | (Guinea) GUI | Ibrahima Sanoh | 5 | 1 | 2+3 | 1 |
| 10 | MF | (Canada) CAN | Alessandro Riggi | 8 | 1 | 6+2 | 1 |
| 11 | FW | (Trinidad and Tobago) TTO | Akeem Garcia | 10 | 6 | 8+2 | 6 |
| 13 | DF | (Canada) CAN | Daniel Kinumbe | 4 | 0 | 3+1 | 0 |
| 14 | DF | (Canada) CAN | Mateo Restrepo | 10 | 0 | 6+4 | 0 |
| 15 | MF | (Canada) CAN | Scott Firth | 2 | 0 | 1+1 | 0 |
| 16 | DF | (Canada) CAN | Luke Green | 1 | 0 | 1+0 | 0 |
| 17 | MF | (Mali) MLI | Aboubacar Sissoko | 10 | 0 | 8+2 | 0 |
| 18 | MF | (Trinidad and Tobago) TTO | Andre Rampersad | 11 | 0 | 9+2 | 0 |
| 20 | DF | (Canada) CAN | Jake Ruby | 8 | 0 | 3+5 | 0 |
| 22 | MF | (Brazil) BRA | João Morelli | 9 | 4 | 8+1 | 4 |
| 23 | FW | (England) ENG | Cory Bent | 10 | 1 | 5+5 | 1 |
| 24 | DF | (Canada) CAN | Alex De Carolis | 6 | 1 | 5+1 | 1 |
| 50 | GK | (Canada) CAN | Christian Oxner | 7 | 0 | 7+0 | 0 |

=== Top scorers ===
| Rank | Nat. | Player | Pos. | Canadian Premier League | TOTAL |
|---|---|---|---|---|---|
| 1 | (Trinidad and Tobago) | Akeem Garcia | FW | 6 | 6 |
| 2 | (Brazil) | João Morelli | MF | 4 | 4 |
| 3 | (Guinea) | Ibrahima Sanoh | FW | 1 | 1 |
| 3 | (Morocco) | Omar Kreim | FW | 1 | 1 |
| 3 | (Canada) | Alex De Carolis | DF | 1 | 1 |
| 3 | (England) | Cory Bent | FW | 1 | 1 |
| 3 | (Canada) | Alessandro Riggi | FW | 1 | 1 |
| Totals | | | | 15 | 15 |

Updated to match played September 20, 2020
Source: Canadian Premier League

=== Top assists ===
| Rank | Nat. | Player | Pos. | Canadian Premier League | TOTAL |
|---|---|---|---|---|---|
| 1 | (Trinidad and Tobago) | Andre Rampersad | MF | 2 | 2 |
| 1 | (Jamaica) | Alex Marshall | FW | 2 | 2 |
| 3 | (Canada) | Alessandro Riggi | MF | 1 | 1 |
| 3 | (Brazil) | João Morelli | MF | 1 | 1 |
| Totals | | | | 6 | 6 |

Updated to match played September 20, 2020
Source: Canadian Premier League

=== Clean sheets ===
| Rank | Nat. | Player | Canadian Premier League | TOTAL |
|---|---|---|---|---|
| 1 | (Canada) | Christian Oxner | 2 | 2 |
| Totals | | | 2 | 2 |

Updated to match played September 20, 2020
Source: Canadian Premier League

=== Disciplinary record ===
| No. | Pos. | Nat. | Player | Canadian Premier League | | TOTAL | |
| No. | Pos. | Nat. | Player | Yellow card | Red card | Yellow card | Red card |
|---|---|---|---|---|---|---|---|
| 1 | GK | (Canada) | Jason Beaulieu | 1 | 0 | 1 | 0 |
| 2 | DF | (Germany) | Peter Schaale | 3 | 0 | 3 | 0 |
| 3 | DF | (Haiti) | Jems Geffrard | 1 | 0 | 1 | 0 |
| 5 | MF | (Canada) | Louis Béland-Goyette | 3 | 0 | 3 | 0 |
| 7 | FW | (Jamaica) | Alex Marshall | 1 | 0 | 1 | 0 |
| 14 | DF | (Canada) | Mateo Restrepo | 1 | 0 | 1 | 0 |
| 18 | MF | (Trinidad and Tobago) | Andre Rampersad | 2 | 0 | 2 | 0 |
| 20 | MF | (Canada) | Jake Ruby | 1 | 0 | 1 | 0 |
| 22 | MF | (Brazil) | João Morelli | 0 | 1 | 0 | 1 |
| 24 | DF | (Canada) | Alex De Carolis | 1 | 0 | 1 | 0 |
| 50 | GK | (Canada) | Christian Oxner | 2 | 0 | 2 | 0 |
| Totals | | | | 16 | 1 | 16 | 1 |

Updated to match played September 20, 2020
Source: Canadian Premier League
