= 2021 HFX Wanderers FC season =

HFX Wanderers
2021 season
- President: Derek Martin
- Head coach: Stephen Hart
- Stadium: Wanderers Grounds
- Canadian Premier League: 6th
- Canadian Championship: Quarter-finals
- Top goalscorer: League: João Morelli (14 goals); All: João Morelli (15 goals)
Home colours	Away colours

The 2021 HFX Wanderers FC season was the third season in the club's history, as well as the third season in Canadian Premier League history.

== Squad ==
As of June 11, 2021

No.	Player	Nationality	Position(s)	Date of birth (age)	Previous club
Goalkeepers
50	Christian Oxner	(Canada)	GK	July 29, 1996 (aged 25)	(Canada) Saint Mary's Huskies
12	Kieran Baskett	(Canada)	GK	September 27, 2001 (aged 20)	(United States) William & Mary Tribe
Defenders
2	Peter Schaale	(Germany)	CB	June 14, 1996 (aged 25)	(Canada) CBU Capers
3	Morey Doner	(Canada)	RB	March 25, 1994 (aged 27)	(Canada) York9 FC
6	Jems Geffrard	(Haiti)	CB	August 26, 1994 (aged 27)	(United States) Fresno FC
14	Mateo Restrepo	(Canada)	RB	April 29, 1997 (aged 24)	(United States) UC Santa Barbara Gauchos
16	Kareem Sow	(Canada)	CB	September 28, 2000 (aged 21)	(Canada) Montreal Carabins
20	Jake Ruby	(Canada)	RB	June 4, 2000 (aged 21)	(Canada) Trinity Western Spartans
31	Eriks Santos	(Brazil)	CB	February 23, 1996 (aged 25)	(Georgia (country)) Dila Gori
Midfielders
5	Pierre Lamothe	(Canada)	AM	September 18, 1997 (aged 24)	(Canada) A.S. Blainville
8	Omar Kreim	(Morocco)	MF	February 10, 1995 (aged 26)	(Canada) Montreal Carabins
10	Alessandro Riggi	(Canada)	LW / RW	November 30, 1993 (aged 28)	(United States) Phoenix Rising
15	Scott Firth	(Canada)	CM	March 2, 2001 (aged 20)	(Canada) Suburban FC
18	Andre Rampersad	(Trinidad and Tobago)	CM	February 2, 1995 (aged 26)	(Trinidad and Tobago) Santa Rosa
21	Marcello Polisi	(Canada)	CM / DM	January 24, 1997 (aged 24)	(Canada) SFU Athletics
22	João Morelli	(Brazil)	AM	March 11, 1996 (aged 25)	(Estonia) FCI Levadia
28	Jérémy Gagnon-Laparé	(Canada)	CM	March 9, 1995 (aged 26)	(United States) Saint Louis FC
Forwards
7	Alex Marshall	(Jamaica)	LW / CF	February 24, 1998 (aged 23)	(Jamaica) Cavalier
9	Samuel Salter	(Canada)	CF	August 9, 2000 (aged 21)	(Canada) AS Blainville
11	Akeem Garcia	(Trinidad and Tobago)	CF / RW	September 11, 1996 (aged 25)	(Trinidad and Tobago) Santa Rosa
23	Cory Bent	(England)	LW / ST	May 14, 1997 (aged 24)	(Canada) CBU Capers
39	Stefan Karajovanovic	(Canada)	CF	April 16, 1999 (aged 22)	(Canada) Carleton Ravens

== Transfers ==
=== In ===
No.	Pos.	Player	From club	Fee/notes	Date	Source
3	DF	(Canada) Morey Doner	(Canada) York9 FC	Free	January 6, 2021	
12	GK	(Canada) Kieran Baskett	(United States) William & Mary Tribe	Free	January 13, 2021	
28	MF	(Canada) Jérémy Gagnon-Laparé	(United States) Saint Louis FC	Free	January 20, 2021	
5	MF	(Canada) Pierre Lamothe	(Canada) A.S. Blainville	Free	January 27, 2021	
9	FW	(Canada) Samuel Salter	(United States) CSUN Matadors	Free	February 10, 2021	
39	FW	(Canada) Stefan Karajovanovic	(Canada) Carleton Ravens	Selected 7th overall in the 2021 CPL–U Sports Draft	June 10, 2021	
16	DF	(Canada) Kareem Sow	(Canada) Montreal Carabins	Selected 10th overall in the 2021 CPL–U Sports Draft	June 11, 2021	
21	MF	(Canada) Marcello Polisi	(Canada) SFU Athletics	Free	June 11, 2021	

==== Draft picks ====
HFX Wanderers selected the following players in the 2021 CPL–U Sports Draft on January 29, 2021. Draft picks are not automatically signed to the team roster. Only those who are signed to a contract will be listed as transfers in.

Round	Selection	Pos.	Player	Nationality	University
1	7	FW	Stefan Karajovanovic	Canada	Carleton Ravens
2	10	DF	Kareem Sow	Canada	Montreal Carabins

=== Out ===
No.	Pos.	Player	To club	Fee/notes	Date	Source
1	GK	(Canada) Jason Beaulieu	Retired		November 3, 2020	
5	MF	(Canada) Louis Béland-Goyette	Gudja United	Contract expired	November 3, 2020	
6	DF	(Canada) Chrisnovic N'sa	(Canada) York United FC	Contract expired	November 3, 2020	
16	DF	(Canada) Luke Green	(Canada) St. Francis Xavier X-Men	Contract expired	November 3, 2020	
24	DF	(Canada) Alex De Carolis	(Sweden) IFK Eskilstuna	Contract expired	November 19, 2020	
17	MF	(Mali) Aboubacar Sissoko	(United States) Indy Eleven	Contract expired	February 10, 2021	
13	DF	(Canada) Daniel Kinumbe		Contract expired	March 31, 2021	
9	FW	(Guinea) Ibrahima Sanoh		Contract expired	March 31, 2021	

== Competitions ==
=== Canadian Premier League ===
==== Table ====
Pos	Team	Pld	W	D	L	GF	GA	GD	Pts	Qualification
1	Forge (S)	28	16	2	10	39	24	+15	50	Advance to playoffs
2	Cavalry	28	14	8	6	34	30	+4	50	Advance to playoffs
3	Pacific (C)	28	13	6	9	47	34	+13	45	Advance to playoffs
4	York United	28	8	12	8	35	39	−4	36	Advance to playoffs
5	Valour	28	10	5	13	38	36	+2	35	
6	HFX Wanderers	28	8	11	9	28	34	−6	35	
7	FC Edmonton	28	6	10	12	34	41	−7	28	
8	Atlético Ottawa	28	6	8	14	30	47	−17	26	

Updated to match(es) played on unknown. Source: CanPL.ca
Rules for classification: 1) points; 2) total wins.
(C) Champions; (S) Regular season winner

==== Results by match ====
Match	1	2	3	4	5	6	7	8	9	10	11	12	13	14	15	16	17	18	19	20	21	22	23	24	25	26	27	28
Result	L	L	D	W	D	L	L	W	W	L	L	D	D	D	W	D	W	D	W	W	D	L	W	D	D	L	L	D
Position	8	7	8	6	7	7	8	7	6	6	7	7	7	7	6	6	6	6	5	5	5	5	4	4	4	4	6	6

Source: #Matches
W = Win; D = Draw; L = Loss

==== Matches ====
June 26 1	Pacific FC	2–0	HFX Wanderers	Winnipeg, Manitoba
5:00pm	Bustos 17'; Bassett 37'; Heard (yellow card) 60'; Chung (yellow card) 70'; Lee (yellow card) 79'	Report	Morelli (yellow card) 72'	Stadium: IG Field; Attendance: 0 Referee: Fabrizio Stasolla

June 30 2	Valour FC	2–0	HFX Wanderers	Winnipeg, Manitoba
8:00pm	Jean-Baptiste 20'; Akio 89'	Report	Ruby (yellow card) 48'; Marshall (yellow card) 71'	Stadium: IG Field; Attendance: 0 Referee: Carly Shaw-MacLaren

July 3 3	Cavalry FC	0–0	HFX Wanderers	Winnipeg, Manitoba
8:00pm	Ledgerwood (yellow card) 45+4'v; Kaiser (yellow card) 53'; Escalante (yellow card) 85'; Simmons (yellow card) 89'	Report	Polisi (yellow card) 67'	Stadium: IG Field; Attendance: 0 Referee: David Barrie

July 10 4	HFX Wanderers	2–1	FC Edmonton	Winnipeg, Manitoba
3:00pm	Morelli 7' (yellow card) 44' (goal) 55'; Doner (yellow card) 90+1'	Report	Aird 64'; Gorskie (yellow card) 84'	Stadium: IG Field; Attendance: 0 Referee: Juan Marquez

July 13 5	HFX Wanderers	0–0	Pacific FC	Winnipeg, Manitoba
9:00pm		Report	Heard (yellow card) 17'; Hojabrpour (yellow card) 58'; Polisi (yellow card) 17'	Stadium: IG Field; Attendance: 0 Referee: Alain Ruch

July 17 6	HFX Wanderers	1–2	Cavalry FC	Winnipeg, Manitoba
3:00pm	Restrepo (yellow card) 24'; Doner (yellow card) 57'; Kreim (yellow card) 84'; Salter 87'	Report	Novak 45+2'; Musse 52'; Selemani (yellow card) 55'; Escalante (yellow card) 60'; Loturi (yellow card) 83'; Klomp (yellow card) 90+3'	Stadium: IG Field; Attendance: 0 Referee: Alain Ruch

July 21 7	FC Edmonton	1–0	HFX Wanderers	Winnipeg, Manitoba
8:00pm	Soria (yellow card) 31'; Temguia (yellow card) 33'; Ongaro 81'	Report	Firth (yellow card) 38'; Oxner (yellow card) 75'	Stadium: IG Field; Attendance: 0 Referee: Fabrizio Stasolla

July 24 8	HFX Wanderers	1–0	Valour FC	Winnipeg, Manitoba
3:00pm	Doner (yellow card) 29'; Lamothe 44' (yellow card) 49'; Morelli (yellow card) 45+2'; Rampersad (yellow card) 54'; Bent (yellow card) 90+4'	Report	Cebara (yellow card) 45+2'	Stadium: IG Field; Attendance: 0 Referee: Carly Shaw-Maclaren

August 2 9	HFX Wanderers	2–1	Atlético Ottawa	Halifax, Nova Scotia
2:00pm ET	Morellia 25', 37'; Garcia (yellow card) 29'	Report	Telfer 21'; Mannella (yellow card) 39'; Shaw (yellow card) 79'; Acosta (yellow card) 90'	Stadium: Wanderers Grounds; Referee: Pierre-Luc Lauzière

August 7 10	HFX Wanderers	2–3	York United FC	Halifax, Nova Scotia
3:00pm	Ruby 21', (yellow card) 78'; Morelli 40'; Restrepo (yellow card) 43'	Report	Ferrari 39'; Johnston 54' (yellow card) 80'; Wilson (yellow card) 67'; Wright 90'	Stadium: Wanderers Grounds; Attendance: 3,800; Referee: David Barrie

August 14 11	Atlético Ottawa	2–1	HFX Wanderers	Ottawa, Ontario
4:00pm	Shaw 39'; Beckie (yellow card) 82'; Wright 87'; Shaw (yellow card) 88'	Report	Garcia 12' (pen.); Karajovanovic (yellow card) 16'; Rampersad (yellow card) 57'	Stadium: TD Place Stadium; Attendance: 12,064; Referee: David Barrie

August 22 12	Forge FC	1–1	HFX Wanderers	Hamilton, Ontario
5:00pm	Nanco (yellow card) 53'; Grant (yellow card) 55'; Awuah 90+6'	Report	Marshall 16'; Gagnon-Laparé (yellow card) 49'; Riggi (yellow card) 90'	Stadium: Tim Hortons Field

August 25 13	York United	1–1	HFX Wanderers	Toronto, Ontario
7:00pm	Ramírez 3'; Wilson (yellow card) 67'; Ferrari (yellow card) 90+5'; Johnston (yellow card) 90+6'	Report	Salter 79'; Polisi (yellow card) 82'; Gagnon-Laparé (yellow card) 85'; Santos (red card) 90+2'	Stadium: York Lions Stadium

August 29 14	Atlético Ottawa	2–2	HFX Wanderers	Ottawa, Ontario
2:30pm	McKendry (yellow card) 35'; Wright 39'; Telfer (yellow card) 45+2', (red card) 45+2'; Verhoven (yellow card) 69'; Shaw 75' (pen.)	Report	Morelli 3', (yellow card) 45+3', (goal) 51'; Karajovanovic (yellow card) 58'; Geffrard (yellow card) 74'	Stadium: TD Place Stadium

September 3 15	HFX Wanderers	2–0	Forge FC	Halifax, Nova Scotia
6:00pm	Karajovanovic 12'; Schaale 62'	Report	Cissé (yellow card) 15'; Bekker (yellow card) 28'	Stadium: Wanderers Grounds

September 6 16	HFX Wanderers	3–3	York United	Halifax, Nova Scotia
3:00pm	Bent (yellow card) 39'; Polisi (yellow card) 70'; Morelli 84' (pen.), 87' (pen.); Schaale (yellow card) 90+1'; Abzi 90+2' (o.g.); Camara (yellow card) 90+3'	Report	Abzi 40'; Ulbricht 52'; Rivero 90' (yellow card) 90+1'	Stadium: Wanderers Grounds; Attendance: 3,446; Referee: Yusri Rudolf

September 11 17	Atlético Ottawa	1–2	HFX Wanderers	Ottawa, Ontario
2:30pm	T. Shaw (yellow card) 38'; Higgins (yellow card) 42'; Verhoven (yellow card) 45'; M. Shaw 52'	Report	Morelli 17' (pen.) (yellow card) 69' (goal) 89'; Schaale (yellow card) 67'	Stadium: TD Place Stadium

September 18 18	York United	0–0	HFX Wanderers	Toronto, Ontario
7:30pm	C. N'sa (yellow card) 84'	Report	Riggi (yellow card) 24'	Stadium: York Lions Stadium

September 25 19	HFX Wanderers	1–0	FC Edmonton	Halifax, Nova Scotia
3:00pm	Morelli 24'; Schaale (yellow card) 87'; Rampersad (yellow card) 90+1'; Garcia (yellow card) 90+1'; Baskett (yellow card) 90+3'	Report		Stadium: Wanderers Grounds

September 29 20	HFX Wanderers	2–1	Atlético Ottawa	Halifax, Nova Scotia
6:30pm	Camara (yellow card) 33'; Morelli 45+3' (pen.) 54'; Baskett (yellow card) 78'; Karajovanovic (yellow card) 86'	Report	Neufville (yellow card) 45+2'; Telfer 68'	Stadium: Wanderers Grounds

October 3 21	York United	2–2	HFX Wanderers	Toronto, Ontario
2:00pm	Rivero 13'; Wilson (yellow card) 23'; Abzi (yellow card) 43'; C. N'sa (yellow card) 60'; Ulbricht (yellow card) 68' (goal) 78'	Report	Garcia 27'; Camara 41'; Portal (yellow card) 82'	Stadium: York Lions Stadium

October 6 22	HFX Wanderers	0–1	Forge FC	Halifax, Nova Scotia
7:00pm	Rampersad (yellow card) 22'; Gagnon-Laparé (yellow card) 27'; Morelli (yellow card) 70'	Report	Babouli (yellow card) 24', (goal) 25'; Awuah (yellow card) 44'; Grant (yellow card) 61'; Nanco (yellow card) 84'	Stadium: Wanderers Grounds; Referee: Fabrizio Stasolla

October 11 23	HFX Wanderers	1–0	Pacific FC	Halifax, Nova Scotia
2:00pm	Bent (yellow card) 2'; Lamothe (yellow card) 7'; Samake 83' (o.g.); Camara (yellow card) 90+3'	Report	Haynes (yellow card) 43'	Stadium: Wanderers Grounds; Referee: David Gantar

October 17 24	Cavalry FC	0–0	HFX Wanderers	Calgary, Alberta
5:00pm	Klomp (yellow card) 73'	Report	Riggi (yellow card) 26'; Santos (yellow card) 46'	Stadium: ATCO Field; Attendance: 2,756; Referee: David Gantar

October 23 25	HFX Wanderers	0–0	Forge FC	Halifax, Nova Scotia
3:00pm ET		Report	Maan (yellow card) 20'; Samuel (yellow card) 76'	Stadium: Wanderers Grounds; Referee: David Barrie

October 26 26	Valour FC	3–0	HFX Wanderers	Winnipeg, Manitoba
9:30pm ET	Akio 38'; Galhardo 45'; Levis (yellow card) 49'; Rea 66'	Report		Stadium: IG Field; Referee: Alain Ruch

October 30 27	Forge FC	4–1	HFX Wanderers	Hamilton, Ontario
2:00pm	Navarro 3', 15'; Choinière 25'; Castello 88'; Cela (yellow card) 90'	Report	Marshall 54'; Garcia (yellow card) 63'	Stadium: Tim Hortons Field; Referee: Pierre-Luc Lauzière

November 7 28	HFX Wanderers	1–1	Atlético Ottawa	Halifax, Nova Scotia
2:00pm	Salter 11'; Schaale (yellow card) 16'; Portal (yellow card) 41'; Santos (yellow card) 56'; Rampersad (yellow card) 67'; Geffrard (yellow card) 88'	Report	Acosta (yellow card) 25'; Arnone 57', (yellow card) 53' (yellow-red card) 57'	Stadium: Wanderers Grounds; Attendance: 6,456; Referee: Fabrizio Stasolla

=== Canadian Championship ===
==== Preliminary round ====
August 17	HFX Wanderers	2–1	A.S. Blainville	Halifax, Nova Scotia
7:00 PM	Bent 10'; Restrepo (yellow card) 58'; Morelli 72' (pen.); Baskett (yellow card) 81'; Marshall (yellow card) 90+6'	Report	Essomé Penda 52' (pen.); Dicko-Raynauld (yellow card) 53'; Islam Haroon (yellow card) 57'; Leconte (yellow card) 57'; Lefèvre (yellow card) 58'; Yesli (yellow card) 71'; Bertrand (yellow card) 90+1'	Stadium: Wanderers Grounds; Attendance: 3,780; Referee: Ben Hoskins

==== Quarter-finals ====
September 22 Quarter-final	HFX Wanderers	1–3	CF Montréal	Halifax, Nova Scotia
6:00PM	Bent 27'; Jérémy Gagnon-Laparé (yellow card) 31'	Report	Matko Miljevic (yellow card) 30'; Miljevic 35'; Tabla 89', 90+2'	Stadium: Wanderers Grounds; Attendance: 6,413; Referee: Yusri Rudolf

== Statistics ==
=== Players ===
No.	Pos	Nat	Name	Total			Canadian Premier League			Canadian Championship		
No.	Pos	Nat	Name	Apps	Goals	Assists	Apps	Goals	Assists	Apps	Goals	Assists
2	DF	(Germany)	Peter Schaale	22	1	1	21	1	1	1	0	0
3	DF	(Canada)	Morey Doner	21	0	3	20	0	3	1	0	0
5	MF	(Canada)	Pierre Lamothe	26	1	1	24	1	0	2	0	1
6	DF	(Haiti)	Jems Geffrard	12	0	0	11	0	0	1	0	0
7	FW	(Jamaica)	Alex Marshall	23	2	1	22	2	1	1	0	0
8	MF	(Morocco)	Omar Kreim	7	0	0	7	0	0	0	0	0
9	FW	(Canada)	Samuel Salter	22	3	1	21	3	1	1	0	0
10	FW	(Canada)	Alessandro Riggi	17	0	0	16	0	0	1	0	0
11	FW	(Trinidad and Tobago)	Akeem Garcia	24	2	1	22	2	1	2	0	0
14	DF	(Canada)	Mateo Restrepo	12	0	0	12	0	0	0	0	0
15	MF	(Canada)	Scott Firth	11	0	0	10	0	0	1	0	0
16	DF	(Canada)	Kareem Sow	11	0	0	11	0	0	0	0	0
18	MF	(Trinidad and Tobago)	Andre Rampersad	29	0	1	27	0	1	2	0	0
19	MF	(Cuba)	Alejandro Portal	10	0	1	10	0	1	0	0	0
20	DF	(Canada)	Jake Ruby	17	1	1	16	1	1	1	0	0
21	MF	(Canada)	Marcello Polisi	17	0	0	15	0	0	2	0	0
22	FW	(Brazil)	João Morelli	23	15	0	21	14	0	2	1	0
23	FW	(England)	Cory Bent	21	2	3	19	0	3	2	2	0
25	FW	(Guinea)	Mamadi Camara	10	1	0	10	1	0	0	0	0
28	MF	(Canada)	Jérémy Gagnon-Laparé	24	0	3	22	0	3	2	0	0
31	DF	(Brazil)	Eriks Santos	20	0	0	18	0	0	2	0	0
39	FW	(Canada)	Stefan Karajovanovic	27	1	2	25	1	2	1	0	0

=== Goalkeepers ===
No.	Nat	Name	Total			Canadian Premier League			Canadian Championship		
No.	Nat	Name	Apps	Conceded	Shutouts	Apps	Conceded	Shutouts	Apps	Conceded	Shutouts
12	(Canada)	Kieran Baskett	12	15	4	10	11	4	2	4	0
50	(Canada)	Christian Oxner	18	23	5	18	23	5	0	0	0
