= 2020 Canadian Premier League final =

Soccer match

- Event: 2020 Canadian Premier League season
Forge FC	HFX Wanderers FC
2	0
- Date: September 19, 2020
- Venue: Alumni Field, Charlottetown, Prince Edward Island
- Man of the Match: Molham Babouli (Forge FC)
- Referee: Juan Márquez
- Attendance: 50
- Weather: Mostly cloudy 13 °C (55 °F); 44% humidity

The 2020 Canadian Premier League final determined the winner of the 2020 Canadian Premier League season. It was played on September 19, 2020, in Charlottetown, Prince Edward Island, between Forge FC, the defending league champion, and HFX Wanderers FC. Those teams qualified as the winner and runner-up of the group stage of The Island Games tournament.

The event was to be contested between the top-seeded team after the regular season and the winner of a one-game playoff, but the season format was revised after being impacted by the COVID-19 pandemic.

Forge FC won the match 2–0 to repeat as league champions, earning the club a berth in the 2021 CONCACAF League and the 2020 Canadian Championship final. Forge ultimately reached the semifinals of the CONCACAF League to qualify for the 2022 CONCACAF Champions League and faced Toronto FC in the Canadian Championship final where the club lost in a penalty shoot-out following a 1–1 draw.

== Background ==
Forge FC entered the final as the defending league champions, having defeated Cavalry FC in the 2019 finals after finishing 2nd in the regular season. HFX Wanderers FC played in their first final, improving from a last-place finish in their inaugural season in 2019.

This was the seventh meeting all-time between the two clubs with each team having recorded one win and four draws against each other. Forge and HFX Wanderers faced off twice during the 2020 season with both matches ending in a 1–1 draw.

== Path to the final ==
=== First stage ===
Pos	Team	Pld	W	D	L	GF	GA	GD	Pts	Qualification
1	Cavalry	7	4	1	2	10	7	+3	13	Advance to group stage
2	HFX Wanderers	7	3	3	1	12	7	+5	12 (Note: Head-to-head points: HFX Wanderers 1, Forge 1. Goal differential: HFX Wanderers +5, Forge +4)	Advance to group stage
3	Forge	7	3	3	1	13	9	+4	12	Advance to group stage
4	Pacific	7	3	2	2	10	8	+2	11	Advance to group stage
5	York9	7	2	4	1	8	7	+1	10	
6	Valour	7	2	2	3	8	9	−1	8 (Note: Head-to-head points: Valour 3, Atlético Ottawa 0.)	
7	Atlético Ottawa	7	2	2	3	7	12	−5	8	
8	FC Edmonton	7	0	1	6	5	14	−9	1	

Source: CanPL.ca
Rules for classification: 1) points; 2) head-to-head points; 3) goal differential; 4) goals for; 5) total wins; 6) U-21 minutes; 7) coin toss or drawing of lots.

=== Group stage ===
Pos / Team / Pld / W / D / L / GF / GA / GD / Pts / Qualification; 1 / Forge / 3 / 2 / 1 / 0 / 4 / 1 / +3 / 7 / Advance to final; 2 / HFX Wanderers / 3 / 1 / 1 / 1 / 3 / 7 / −4 / 4 / Advance to final; 3 / Cavalry / 3 / 1 / 0 / 2 / 4 / 4 / 0 / 3 (Note: Head-to-head points: Cavalry 3, Pacific 0.); 4 / Pacific / 3 / 1 / 0 / 2 / 6 / 5 / +1 / 3; Source: CanPL.ca; Notes:
Forge FC		Matches	HFX Wanderers FC	
Opponent	Result	Matches	Opponent	Result
HFX Wanderers FC	1–1	Match 1	Forge FC	1–1
Pacific FC	2–0	Match 2	Cavalry FC	2–1
Cavalry FC	1–0	Match 3	Pacific FC	0–5

== Match details ==
=== Details ===
September 19
3:00 pm ADT

Forge FC	2–0	HFX Wanderers
Achinioti-Jönsson 60'; Tissot 90'	Recap; Report

Alumni Field, Charlottetown, Prince Edward Island
Referee: Juan Márquez

Forge	HFX Wanderers

Forge FC:
GK	1	(Canada) Triston Henry
RB	4	(Canada) Dominic Samuel
CB	14	(Canada) David Edgar	(yellow card) 65'
CB	5	(Belgium) Daniël Krutzen
LB	6	(Canada) Kwame Awuah
CM	24	(Belgium) Paolo Sabak		(substituted off) 80'
CM	13	(Sweden) Alexander Achinioti-Jönsson
CM	10	(Canada) Kyle Bekker (c)
RW	7	(Canada) David Choinière		(substituted off) 90'
LW	2	(Canada) Jonathan Grant	(yellow card) 58'	(substituted off) 67'
CF	19	(Canada) Molham Babouli		(substituted off) 80'
Substitutes:
GK	31	(Canada) Baj Maan
FW	9	(Canada) Marcel Zajac
FW	11	(Canada) Chris Nanco
MF	15	(Canada) Maxim Tissot		(substituted on) 80'
FW	17	(Canada) Kadell Thomas		(substituted on) 67'
FW	20	(Canada) Gabriel Balbinotti
DF	21	(Canada) Jordan Dunstan		(substituted on) 90'
DF	22	(Canada) Monti Mohsen
FW	23	(Canada) Anthony Novak		(substituted on) 80'
Manager: (Canada) Bobby Smyrniotis

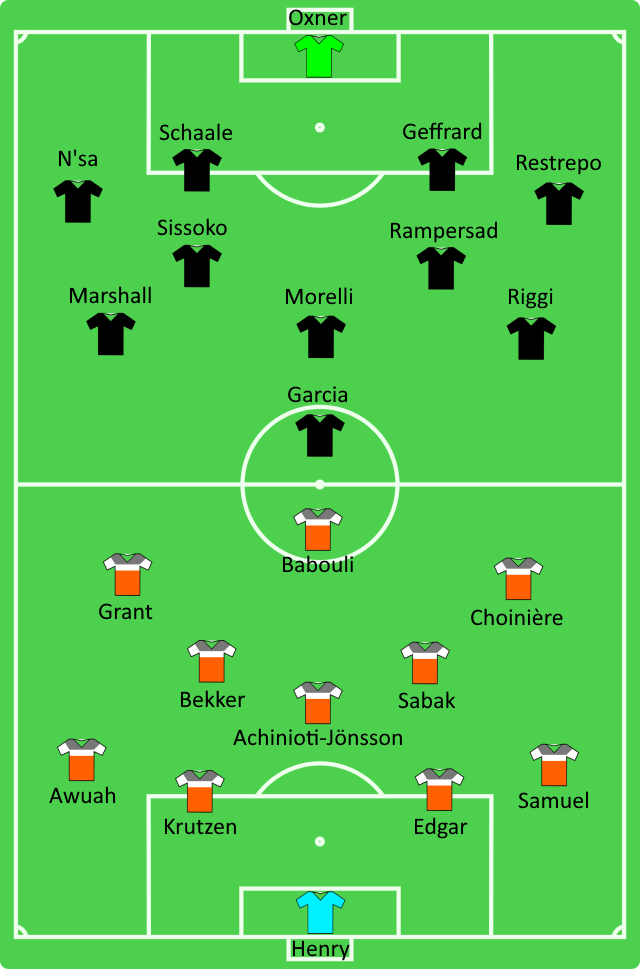

HFX Wanderers:
GK	50	(Canada) Christian Oxner
RB	6	(Canada) Chrisnovic N'sa
CB	2	(Germany) Peter Schaale
CB	3	(Haiti) Jems Geffrard
LB	14	(Canada) Mateo Restrepo
CM	17	(Mali) Aboubacar Sissoko
CM	18	(Trinidad and Tobago) Andre Rampersad (c)
RW	7	(Jamaica) Alex Marshall
AM	22	(Brazil) João Morelli	(substituted off) 81'
LW	10	(Canada) Alessandro Riggi	(substituted off) 71'
CF	11	(Trinidad and Tobago) Akeem Garcia
Substitutes:
GK	1	(Canada) Jason Beaulieu
MF	5	(Canada) Louis Béland-Goyette
MF	8	(Morocco) Omar Kreim	(substituted on) 81'
FW	9	(Guinea) Ibrahima Sanoh
DF	13	(Canada) Daniel Kinumbe
MF	15	(Canada) Scott Firth
DF	20	(Canada) Jake Ruby
FW	23	(England) Cory Bent	(substituted on) 71'
DF	24	(Canada) Alex De Carolis
Manager: (Trinidad and Tobago) Stephen Hart

Man of the Match:
Molham Babouli (Forge FC)

Assistant referees:
Gabrielle Lemieux
Stefan Tanaka-Freundt
Fourth official:
Myriam Marcotte
