= 2021 FC Edmonton season =

FC Edmonton
2021 season
- General manager: Eric Newendorp
- Head coach: Alan Koch
- Stadium: Clarke Stadium
- Canadian Premier League: 7th
- Canadian Championship: Preliminary Round
- Top goalscorer: Easton Ongaro (12 goals)
Home colours	Away colours

The 2021 FC Edmonton season was the club's tenth competitive season as well as their third in the Canadian Premier League.

== Overview ==
The 2021 season was very disappointing for FC Edmonton. Edmonton's average home attendance of 961 was by far the lowest in the league, and the team finished in 7th out of 8 teams. Additionally, the club shut down its academy. However, there were some bright spots, including young Canadian forward Easton Ongaro who became the league's all-time top goalscorer this season, and secured a transfer to Romania after the season ended.

== Current squad ==
As of July 6, 2021.

No.	Name	Nationality	Position(s)	Date of birth (age)	Previous club
Goalkeepers
1	Connor James	(Canada)	GK	July 17, 1996 (aged 25)	(Canada) Alberta Golden Bears
48	Darlington Murasiranwa	(Canada)	GK	February 7, 2001 (aged 20)	(Canada) Guelph Gryphons
90	Joseph Holliday	(Canada)	GK	January 18, 2005 (aged 16)	Academy
Defenders
3	Jeannot Esua	(Cameroon)	RB / RW	August 6, 1996 (aged 25)	(Cameroon) Rainbow Bamenda
4	Allan Zebie	(Canada)	LB	May 29, 1993 (aged 28)	(Canada) FC Edmonton (NASL)
5	Ramón Soria	(Spain)	CB / DM	March 7, 1989 (aged 32)	(Spain) Formentera
8	Mélé Temguia	(Germany)	CB	August 1, 1995 (aged 26)	(Australia) Valentine Phoenix
12	Sharly Mabussi	(Democratic Republic of the Congo)	LB	May 27, 1997 (aged 24)	(France) Bergerac Foot
14	Saah T-Boy Fayia	(Canada)	CB	February 1, 2001 (aged 20)	Academy
27	Hunter Gorskie	(United States)	CB	June 27, 1991 (aged 30)	(United States) San Antonio FC
55	Amer Didic	(Canada)	CB	December 28, 1994 (aged 27)	(United States) San Antonio FC
Midfielders
2	Paris Gee	(Canada)	DM / CB	July 5, 1994 (aged 27)	(United States) Saint Louis FC
7	Shamit Shome	(Canada)	AM	September 5, 1997 (aged 24)	(Canada) Montreal Impact
10	Kyle Porter	(Canada)	RM	January 19, 1990 (aged 31)	(Canada) York9 FC
17	Marcus Velado-Tsegaye	(Canada)	LW / RW / ST	July 1, 2001 (aged 20)	Academy
20	Antony Caceres	(Canada)	CM	January 31, 2000 (aged 21)	(Canada) Vancouver Whitecaps Academy
21	Tomas Giraldo	(Canada)	AM	March 8, 2003 (aged 18)	(Canada) CF Montréal
28	Thomas Gardner	(Canada)	CM	March 17, 1998 (aged 23)	(Canada) UBC Thunderbirds
33	Fraser Aird	(Canada)	MF	February 2, 1995 (aged 26)	(Canada) Valour FC
Forwards
9	Easton Ongaro	(Canada)	ST	June 5, 1998 (aged 23)	(Canada) Alberta Golden Bears
13	Roberto Avila	(United States)	CF / AM	October 16, 2000 (aged 21)	(United States) Austin Bold
19	Tobias Warschewski	(Germany)	CF	February 6, 1998 (aged 23)	(Germany) Phönix Lübeck
26	Matthew Durrans	(Canada)	CF	December 10, 1998 (aged 23)	(Germany) 1860 Munich

== Transfers ==
=== In ===
==== Transferred in ====
No.	Pos.	Player	From club	Fee/notes	Date	Source
2	MF	(Canada) Paris Gee	(United States) Saint Louis FC	Free	December 10, 2020	
10	MF	(Canada) Kyle Porter	(Canada) York9 FC	Free	December 23, 2020	
33	MF	(Canada) Fraser Aird	(Canada) Valour FC	Free	December 24, 2020	
7	MF	(Canada) Shamit Shome	(Canada) Montreal Impact	Free	January 4, 2021	
12	DF	(Democratic Republic of the Congo) Sharly Mabussi	(France) Bergerac Foot	Free	January 7, 2021	
48	GK	(Canada) Darlington Murasiranwa	(Canada) Guelph Gryphons	Free	February 5, 2021	
19	FW	(Germany) Tobias Warschewski	(Germany) Phönix Lübeck	Free	February 19, 2021	
28	MF	(Canada) Thomas Gardner	(Canada) UBC Thunderbirds	Selected 1st overall in the 2021 CPL–U Sports Draft	March 23, 2021	
27	DF	(United States) Hunter Gorskie	(United States) San Antonio FC	Free	June 9, 2021	
90	GK	(Canada) Joseph Holliday	Academy Graduate		June 22, 2021	
14	DF	(Canada) Saah T-Boy Fayia	Academy Graduate		June 24, 2021	
26	FW	(Canada) Matthew Durrans	(Germany) 1860 Munich	Free	July 6, 2021	

==== Loans in ====
No.	Pos.	Player	Loaned from	Fee/notes	Date	Source
21	MF	(Canada) Tomas Giraldo	(Canada) CF Montréal	Season-long loan	February 12, 2021	
13	FW	(United States) Roberto Avila	(United States) Austin Bold	Season-long loan	June 14, 2021	

==== Draft picks ====
FC Edmonton selected the following players in the 2021 CPL–U Sports Draft on January 29, 2021. Draft picks are not automatically signed to the team roster. Only those who are signed to a contract will be listed as transfers in.

Round	Selection	Pos.	Player	Nationality	University
1	1	MF	Thomas Gardner	Canada	UBC Thunderbirds
2	16	DF	Jackson Farmer	Canada	UBC Thunderbirds

=== Out ===
No.	Pos.	Player	To club	Fee/notes	Date	Source
13	GK	(Canada) Dylon Powley	(Canada) Atlético Ottawa	Contract expired	January 18, 2021	
6	MF	(Ghana) Edem Mortotsi	(Tanzania) Young Africans	Contract expired	January 27, 2021	
11	MF	(Canada) Keven Alemán	(Canada) Valour FC	Contract expired	February 4, 2021	
12	DF	(Trinidad and Tobago) Kareem Moses	(Finland) Vaasan Palloseura	Contract expired	February 4, 2021	
23	DF	(Canada) Duran Lee	(Canada) Pacific FC	Contract expired	March 18, 2021	
21	MF	(Sweden) Erik Zetterberg	(Sweden) Lindome GIF	Contract expired	March 22, 2021	
26	FW	(Canada) David Doe	(United States) South Bend Lions	Contract expired	April 2, 2021	
	MF	(Peru) Raúl Tito		Contract terminated by mutual consent	June 21, 2021	
14	MF	(Canada) Chance Carter	Retired		June 24, 2021	

==== Loans out ====
No.	Pos.	Player	Loaned to	Fee/notes	Date	Source
	MF	(Peru) Raúl Tito	(Peru) Santos de Nasca	Loaned until March 31, 2021	October 10, 2020	

== Competitions ==
=== Canadian Premier League ===
==== Table ====
Pos	Team	Pld	W	D	L	GF	GA	GD	Pts	Qualification
1	Forge (S)	28	16	2	10	39	24	+15	50	Advance to playoffs
2	Cavalry	28	14	8	6	34	30	+4	50	Advance to playoffs
3	Pacific (C)	28	13	6	9	47	34	+13	45	Advance to playoffs
4	York United	28	8	12	8	35	39	−4	36	Advance to playoffs
5	Valour	28	10	5	13	38	36	+2	35	
6	HFX Wanderers	28	8	11	9	28	34	−6	35	
7	FC Edmonton	28	6	10	12	34	41	−7	28	
8	Atlético Ottawa	28	6	8	14	30	47	−17	26	

Updated to match(es) played on unknown. Source: CanPL.ca
Rules for classification: 1) points; 2) total wins.
(C) Champions; (S) Regular season winner

==== Results by match ====
Match	1	2	3	4	5	6	7	8	9	10	11	12	13	14	15	16	17	18	19	20	21	22	23	24	25	26	27	28
Result	L	W	D	L	L	D	W	L	W	L	D	D	L	D	L	L	W	D	L	L	D	W	D	L	D	L	D	W
Position	6	5	3	7	8	8	5	6	5	7	6	6	6	6	7	7	7	7	7	7	7	7	7	7	7	8	8	7

Updated to match(es) played on November 13, 2021. Source: #Matches
W = Win; D = Draw; L = Loss

==== Matches ====
June 26 1	FC Edmonton	0–1	Atlético Ottawa	Winnipeg, Manitoba
2:00pm ET	Soria (yellow card) 28'; Đidić (yellow card) 67'; Esua (yellow card) 71'	Report	Lawson (yellow card) 78'; Viti 82'	Stadium: IG Field; Attendance: 0 Referee: Alain Ruch

July 1 2	FC Edmonton	2–0	Forge FC	Winnipeg, Manitoba
8:00pm	Avila (yellow card) 29'; Soria 87'; Esua 90+4'	Report	Jaković (yellow card) 53'; Bekker (yellow card) 68'	Stadium: IG Field; Attendance: 0 Referee: Juan Marquez

July 4 3	FC Edmonton	1–1	York United	Winnipeg, Manitoba
2:00pm ET	Aird 52'	Report	Thompson (yellow card) 42'; Petrasso 67'; Zator (yellow card) 78'; Mohammed (yellow card) 88'; Ramírez (yellow card) 89'; Halley (yellow card) 90'; Giantsopoulos (yellow card) 90'	Stadium: IG Field; Attendance: 0 Referee: Fabrizio Stasolla

July 10 4	HFX Wanderers FC	2–1	FC Edmonton	Winnipeg, Manitoba
2:00pm ET	Morelli 7' (yellow card) 44' (goal) 55'; Doner (yellow card) 90+1'	Report	Aird 64'; Gorskie (yellow card) 84'	Stadium: IG Field; Attendance: 0 Referee: Ben Hoskins

July 14 5	Forge FC	1–0	FC Edmonton	Winnipeg, Manitoba
10:00pm ET	Babouli 38' (pen.), (yellow card) 69'; Sabak (yellow card) 43'; Henry (yellow card) 77'; Awuah (yellow card) 90+1'	Report	Avila (yellow card) 36'	Stadium: IG Field; Attendance: 0 Referee: David Barrie

July 18 6	Atlético Ottawa	1–1	FC Edmonton	Winnipeg, Manitoba
7:30pm	Verhoven 4', (yellow card) 28'; Mannella (yellow card) 70'	Report	Mabussi (yellow card) 27'; Porter 86'	Stadium: IG Field; Attendance: 0 Referee: Carly Shaw-MacLaren

July 21 7	FC Edmonton	1–0	HFX Wanderers	Winnipeg, Manitoba
7:00pm ET	Soria (yellow card) 31'; Temguia (yellow card) 33'; Ongaro 81'	Report	Firth (yellow card) 38'; Oxner (yellow card) 75'	Stadium: IG Field; Attendance: 0 Referee: Fabrizio Stasolla

July 24 8	York United	1–0	FC Edmonton	Winnipeg, Manitoba
5:00pm ET	Johnston 12'; Abzi (yellow card) 61'; Toussaint (yellow card) 63'	Report	Didic (yellow card) 26'; Mabussi (yellow card) 42'	Stadium: IG Field; Attendance: 0 Referee: Juan Marquez

July 31 9	FC Edmonton	3–1	Valour FC	Edmonton, Alberta
7:00pm MT	Ongaro 13'; Mabussi (yellow card) 25'; Warschewski 55'; Didic 63'	Report	Alemán (yellow card) 2'; Baquero 88'	Stadium: Clarke Stadium; Attendance: 2,501; Referee: David Gantar

August 3 10 Wildrose Cup	Cavalry FC	2–1	FC Edmonton	Calgary, Alberta
7:00 pm	Yao (yellow card) 16'; Mason 64'; Klomp 71'	Report	Mabussi (yellow card) 10'; Ongaro 19'; Temguia (yellow card) 85'	Stadium: ATCO Field; Attendance: 2,418; Referee: Juan Marquez

August 7 11	Pacific FC	2–2	FC Edmonton	Langford, British Columbia
4:30 pm	Bassett (yellow card) 15'; Polisi 42'; Campbell 87'	Report	Đidić (yellow card) 35'; Ongaro 58'; Aird (yellow card) 62'; Shome (yellow card) 65'; Warschewski 76'; Warschewski (yellow card) 83'	Stadium: Starlight Stadium; Attendance: 2,259; Referee: Carly Shaw-MacLaren

August 12 12	FC Edmonton	0–0	Valour FC	Edmonton, Alberta
7:00 pm	Ongaro (yellow card) 30'; Gee (yellow card) 38'	Report	Dyer (yellow card) 15'; Fordyce (yellow card) 45'; Soto (yellow card) 53'; Ohin (yellow card) 60'; Kacher (yellow card) 90'	Stadium: Clarke Stadium; Attendance: 803; Referee: Juan Marquez

August 24 13	Valour FC	3–0	FC Edmonton	Winnipeg, Manitoba
6:00 pm	Akio 2', 52'; Galhardo 62'; Rodrigo Reyes (yellow card) 75'; Bouka Moutou (yellow card) 80'; Mikhael (yellow card) 90+2'	Report	Ongaro (yellow card) 37'; Didic (yellow card) 41'	Stadium: IG Field; Attendance: 2,480; Referee: Mathieu Souaré

August 29 14 Wildrose Cup	Cavalry FC	2–2	FC Edmonton	Calgary, Alberta
2:00 pm	Di Chiara (yellow card) 14', (goal) 30'; Mason 90'; Loturi (yellow card) 90+6'	Report	Gonzalez 7'; Aird 36' (pen.); Najem (yellow card) 87'	Stadium: ATCO Field; Attendance: 3,489; Referee: Fabrizio Stasolla

September 1 15 Wildrose Cup	FC Edmonton	0–1	Cavalry FC	Edmonton, Alberta
7:00 pm	Gorskie (yellow card) 90+2'	Report	Trafford (yellow card) 6'; Novak 26'; Di Chiara (yellow card) 45'	Stadium: Clarke Stadium; Attendance: 470; Referee: Yusri Rudolf

September 4 16	FC Edmonton	1–2	Pacific FC	Edmonton, Alberta
7:00 pm	Aird (yellow card) 54'; Ongaro 72'	Report	Dixon (red card) 14'; Díaz 28'; Chung 34'	Stadium: Clarke Stadium; Attendance: 1,352; Referee: Alain Ruch

September 7 17	Valour FC	0–3	FC Edmonton	Winnipeg, Manitoba
7:00 pm	Ohin (yellow card) 90+2'	Report	Gee (yellow card) 33'; Warschewski 40'; Ongaro 44'; Shome (yellow card) 71'; Gonzalez 73'	Stadium: IG Field; Attendance: 2,446; Referee: Juan Marquez

September 14 18	FC Edmonton	1–1	Pacific FC	Edmonton, Alberta
8:00 pm	Ongaro 57'	Report	Heard (yellow card) 59'; Dixon (yellow card) 77'; MacNaughton 90+2'	Stadium: Clarke Stadium; Attendance: 670; Referee: Yusri Rudolf

September 25 19	HFX Wanderers	1–0	FC Edmonton	Halifax, Nova Scotia
12:00 pm	Morelli 24'; Schaale (yellow card) 87'; Rampersad (yellow card) 90+1'; Garcia (yellow card) 90+1'; Baskett (yellow card) 90+3'	Report		Stadium: Wanderers Grounds; Attendance: 6,133; Referee: David Barrie

September 29 20 Wildrose Cup	FC Edmonton	2–3	Cavalry FC	Edmonton, Alberta
8:00 pm	Ongaro 47'; Didic 70'; Esua (red card) 84'	Report	Fisk 34'; Escalante (yellow card) 35'; Selemani 44'; Klomp 80'; Farsi (yellow card) 90+2'	Stadium: Clarke Stadium; Attendance: 991; Referee: David Gantar

October 2 21	Valour FC	1–1	FC Edmonton	Winnipeg, Manitoba
1:00 pm	Dyer 14'; Baquero (yellow card) 50'; Alemán (yellow card) 57'; Galán (yellow card) 86'	Report	Tboy Fayia (yellow card) 33'; Ongaro 67'	Stadium: IG Field; Referee: Ben Hoskins

October 6 22	FC Edmonton	2–1	Pacific FC	Edmonton, Alberta
4:00 pm	Gonzalez 30', (yellow card) 52'; Ongaro 38'; Gee (yellow card) 43'; Aird (yellow card) 57'; Zebie (yellow card) 90+1'	Report	Hojabrpour 48', (yellow card) 49'; McNaughton (yellow card) 52'	Stadium: Clarke Stadium; Referee: Nicolas Joubert

October 9 23 Wildrose Cup	Cavalry FC	1–1	FC Edmonton	Calgary, Alberta
2:00 pm	Luca 20'; Camargo (yellow card) 38'; Ledgerwood (yellow card) 64'	Report	Velado-Tsegaye 15'; Najem (yellow card) 90+2'	Stadium: ATCO Field; Attendance: 3,102; Referee: Alain Ruch

October 12 24	FC Edmonton	3–4	Atlético Ottawa	Edmonton, Alberta
7:00 pm	Gonzalez 17'; Gorskie (yellow card) 45'; Najem 63'; Aird 76' (pen.)	Report	Wright 5' (pen.), 39'; McKendry 49'; Soto 57'; Beckie (yellow card) 86'	Stadium: Clarke Stadium; Attendance: 580; Referee: Juan Marquez

October 17 25	York United	1–1	FC Edmonton	Toronto, Ontario
12:00 pm	Wilson (yellow card) 28'; Faria 53'; Abzi (yellow card) 90+1'	Report	Fayia (yellow card) 34'; Ongaro 47'; Najem (yellow card) 90+2'	Stadium: York Lions Stadium; Referee: Carly Shaw-MacLaren

October 26 26	Pacific FC	5–1	FC Edmonton	Langford, British Columbia
8:30 pm	Díaz 6'; Aparicio 20', 51', (yellow card) 57'; Basset (yellow card) 27'; Bustos 41', 69' (pen.); Campbell (yellow card) 56'	Report	James (yellow card) 69'; Aird 78' (pen.)	Stadium: Starlight Stadium; Attendance: 2,548; Referee: Fabrizio Stasolla

November 6 27	FC Edmonton	3–3	Valour FC	Edmonton, Alberta
1:30 pm	Warschewski 4'; Didic 16'; Gonzalez 48'; Temguia (yellow card) 72'; Najem (yellow card) 90+3'	Report	Dyer 78' 81'; Fordyce 88'; Romeo (yellow card) 90+3'	Stadium: Clarke Stadium; Attendance: 716; Referee: David Barrie

November 13 28	FC Edmonton	1–0	Forge FC	Edmonton, Alberta
12:00 pm	Gorskie (yellow card) 61'; Temguia (yellow card) 75'; Ongaro 75'	Report	Navarro (yellow card) 43'	Stadium: Clarke Stadium; Attendance: 564; Referee: Juan Marquez

=== Canadian Championship ===
August 21 PR	FC Edmonton	0–2	Cavalry FC	Edmonton, Alberta
3:00 PM		Report	Mason 31'; Fisk 62'	Stadium: Clarke Stadium; Attendance: 1,189; Referee: Yusri Rudolf

== Statistics ==
No.	Pos	Nat	Name	Total			Canadian Premier League			Canadian Championship		
No.	Pos	Nat	Name	Apps	Goals	Assists	Apps	Goals	Assists	Apps	Goals	Assists
2	DF	(Canada)	Paris Gee	27	0	0	27	0	0	0	0	0
3	DF	(Cameroon)	Jeannot Esua	20	1	0	19	1	0	1	0	0
4	DF	(Canada)	Allan Zebie	11	0	0	11	0	0	0	0	0
5	DF	(Spain)	Ramón Soria	27	1	1	26	1	1	1	0	0
6	MF	(Islamic Republic of Afghanistan)	Adam Najem	17	1	2	16	1	2	1	0	0
7	MF	(Canada)	Shamit Shome	28	0	2	27	0	2	1	0	0
8	DF	(Germany)	Mélé Temguia	22	0	0	21	0	0	1	0	0
9	FW	(Canada)	Easton Ongaro	28	12	2	27	12	2	1	0	0
10	FW	(Canada)	Kyle Porter	20	1	0	19	1	0	1	0	0
11	FW	(United States)	Azriel Gonzalez	17	5	3	16	5	3	1	0	0
12	DF	(Democratic Republic of the Congo)	Sharly Mabussi	12	0	0	11	0	0	1	0	0
13	FW	(United States)	Beto Avila	6	0	0	6	0	0	0	0	0
14	MF	(Canada)	T-Boy Fayia	11	0	0	10	0	0	1	0	0
17	FW	(El Salvador)	Marcus Velado-Tsegaye	9	1	0	9	1	0	0	0	0
19	FW	(Germany)	Tobias Warschewski	27	4	7	26	4	7	1	0	0
20	MF	(Canada)	Antony Caceres	11	0	0	11	0	0	0	0	0
23	FW	(Canada)	Gabriel Boakye	7	0	0	7	0	0	0	0	0
25	MF	(Tanzania)	Prince Amanda	3	0	0	3	0	0	0	0	0
26	FW	(Canada)	Matthew Durrans	17	0	1	16	0	1	1	0	0
27	DF	(United States)	Hunter Gorskie	26	0	1	25	0	1	1	0	0
28	MF	(Canada)	Thomas Gardner	10	0	0	10	0	0	0	0	0
33	FW	(Canada)	Fraser Aird	29	5	5	28	5	5	1	0	0
55	DF	(Canada)	Amer Đidić	25	3	1	24	3	1	1	0	0

=== Goalkeepers ===
No.	Nat	Name	Total			Canadian Premier League			Canadian Championship		
No.	Nat	Name	Apps	Conceded	Shutouts	Apps	Conceded	Shutouts	Apps	Conceded	Shutouts
1	(Canada)	Connor James	24	36	4	24	36	4	0	0	0
48	(Zimbabwe)	Darlington Murasiranwa	6	7	1	5	5	1	1	2	0
