= CPL–U Sports Draft =

Canadian soccer draft of university athletes

Logo of the CPL–U Sports Draft

The CPL–U Sports Draft (French: Repêchage de la PLC–U Sports) is an annual event in which Canadian Premier League clubs select players from U Sports, Canada's governing body for university sports. The draft allows student-athletes to play professional soccer that year without affecting their university eligibility.

== Rules and procedure ==
Players are eligible to be drafted if they have one or more years of U Sports eligibility remaining and have declared for the draft. Players who signed development contracts the previous year can be retained by their CPL clubs as long as they have U Sports eligibility remaining. Previously drafted players who do not sign and remain draft-eligible can re-enter the draft in subsequent years.

The previous season's league standings, including playoffs and final standings, determine the draft order. The draft previously employed a "snake draft" format with the selection order reversing after each round, however this was discontinued after the 2021 draft. Clubs have a window of time in which they must submit their pick, and failure to do so results in a pass. There is a break between each round, as well as one timeout per club.

== U Sports contract ==
Drafted players will get an invitation to the team's preseason camp, with the opportunity to earn a U Sports contract. The U Sports contract allows players to be paid to play in the CPL in the spring and summer, before returning to their university team before August 15 for the U Sports men's soccer season. Players on U Sports contracts do not count toward their team's 23-man roster limit. Players can also sign fully professional CPL standard contracts and forego their remaining university eligibility.

Signed players can remain with their CPL club until the end of the season in early November by extending their U Sports contract. These players would be ineligible to participate in U Sports the same season as their contract but would regain eligibility the following year.

== List of drafts ==
Draft	Season	Date	Rds	Picks	City	First selection	School	Team	Ref
2018	2019	November 12, 2018	3	21	Vancouver, British Columbia	Gabriel Bitar	Carleton	Cavalry FC	
2019	2020	November 11, 2019	2	14	Montreal, Quebec	Cory Bent	Cape Breton	HFX Wanderers	
2021	2021	January 29, 2021	2	16	Held virtually	Thomas Gardner	British Columbia	FC Edmonton	
2022	2022	January 20, 2022	2	16	Held virtually	José Cunha	Cape Breton	Atlético Ottawa	
2023	2023	December 15, 2022	2	16	Held virtually	Anthony White	Toronto	Vancouver FC	
2024	2024	December 14, 2023	2	16	Held virtually	(Canada) Owen Sheppard	Cape Breton	Valour FC	
2025	2025	December 5, 2024	2	16	Held virtually	(Canada) Jevontae Layne	Toronto Metropolitan	Valour FC	
2026	2026	November 28, 2025	2	16	Held virtually	(Moldova) Călin Calaidjoglu	Université de Montréal	FC Supra du Québec	
2027	2027	December 9, 2026	2	16	Held virtually			Pacific FC	
