= Sharly Mabussi =

Congolese footballer (born 1997)

Personal information
- Full name: Sharly Mabussi
- Date of birth: 27 May 1997 (age 29)
- Place of birth: Kinshasa, DR Congo
- Height: 1.77 m (5 ft 10 in)
- Position: Left-back

Youth career
- 2009–2013: Stade Mayennais
- 2013–2015: Laval

Senior career*
| Years | Team | Apps | (Gls) |
| 2014–2019 | Laval B | 70 | (2) |
| 2016–2019 | Laval | 26 | (0) |
| 2019–2020 | Bergerac Foot | 8 | (0) |
| 2021 | FC Edmonton | 11 | (0) |
| 2022 | Oțelul Galați | 0 | (0) |
| 2022–2023 | AS Poissy | 2 | (0) |
| 2023–2024 | Bourges Foot 18 | 3 | (0) |
- * Club domestic league appearances and goals as of 21:52, 26 October 2024 (UTC)

Sharly Mabussi (born 27 May 1997) is a Congolese professional footballer who plays as a left-back.

== Early life ==
Mabussi was born and raised in Kinshasa, Democratic Republic of the Congo.

== Club career ==
He joined Laval academy in 2013 after four years playing at Stade Mayennais. In January 2018 he signed his first professional contract.

=== FC Edmonton ===
On 7 January 2021, Mabussi signed with Canadian Premier League side FC Edmonton. On February 9, 2022, the club announced that Mabussi and all but two other players would not be returning for the 2022 season.

== Career statistics ==
As of 7 January 2021

Club statistics
| Club | Season | League | | | National Cup (Note: Includes appearances in the Coupe de France.) | | Other (Note: Includes appearances in the Coupe de la Ligue.) | | Total | |
| Club | Season | Division | Apps | Goals | Apps | Goals | Apps | Goals | Apps | Goals |
|---|---|---|---|---|---|---|---|---|---|---|
| Laval B | 2014–15 | National 3 | 6 | 0 | — | | 0 | 0 | 6 | 0 |
| Laval B | 2015–16 | National 3 | 21 | 1 | — | | 0 | 0 | 21 | 1 |
| Laval B | 2016–17 | National 3 | 16 | 1 | — | | 0 | 0 | 16 | 1 |
| Laval B | 2017–18 | National 3 | 14 | 0 | — | | 0 | 0 | 14 | 0 |
| Laval B | 2018–19 | National 3 | 13 | 0 | — | | 0 | 0 | 13 | 0 |
| Laval B | Total | | 70 | 2 | 0 | 0 | 0 | 0 | 70 | 2 |
| Laval | 2016–17 | Ligue 2 | 6 | 0 | 0 | 0 | 0 | 0 | 6 | 0 |
| Laval | 2017–18 | National 1 | 6 | 0 | 0 | 0 | 0 | 0 | 6 | 0 |
| Laval | 2018–19 | National 1 | 14 | 0 | 0 | 0 | 1 | 0 | 15 | 0 |
| Laval | Total | | 26 | 0 | 0 | 0 | 0 | 0 | 27 | 0 |
| Bergerac Foot | 2019–20 | National 2 | 8 | 0 | 2 | 0 | 0 | 0 | 10 | 0 |
| FC Edmonton | 2021 | Canadian Premier League | 0 | 0 | 0 | 0 | 0 | 0 | 0 | 0 |
| Career total | | | 104 | 2 | 2 | 0 | 1 | 0 | 107 | 2 |
