= Stefan Karajovanovic =

Canadian soccer player (born 1999)

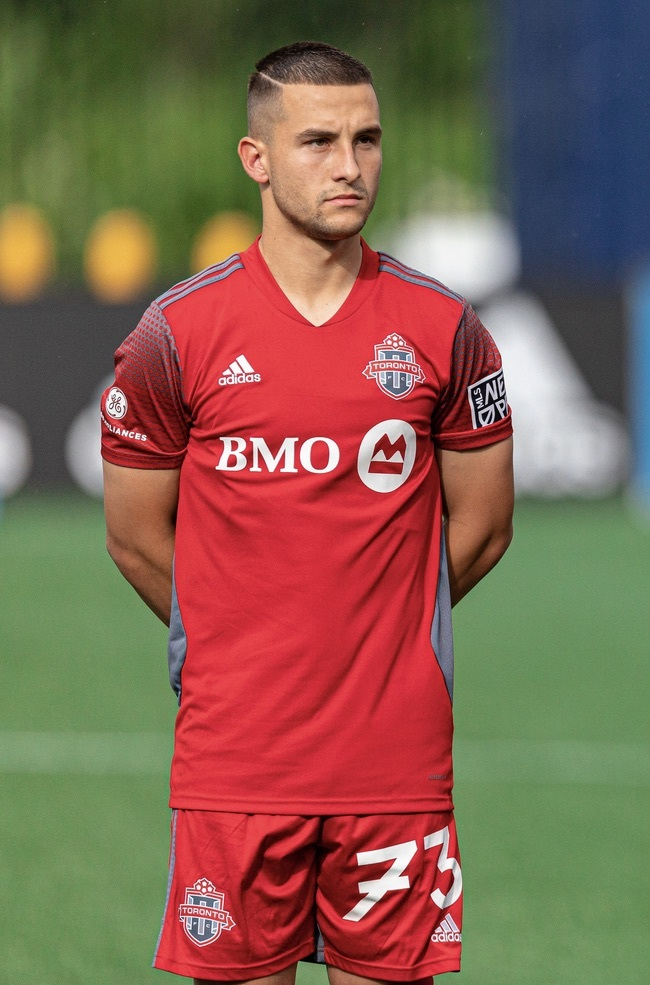
- Karajovanovic with Toronto FC II in 2022

Personal information
- Date of birth: April 16, 1999 (age 27)
- Place of birth: Gatineau, Quebec, Canada
- Height: 1.76 m (5 ft 9 in)
- Position: Forward

Youth career
- 2012–2016: AS Hull
- 2015: Montreal Impact
- 2015–2016: Ottawa Fury

College career
Years	Team	Apps	(Gls)
2017–2019	Carleton Ravens	37	(35)

Senior career*
Years	Team	Apps	(Gls)
2016	Ottawa Fury Academy	5	(0)
2017–2018	FC Gatineau	14	(16)
2019	AS Blainville	12	(5)
2020	Ottawa South United	6	(7)
2021	HFX Wanderers	26	(1)
2022	Toronto FC II	19	(2)
2023	Napier City Rovers	12	(7)
- * Club domestic league appearances and goals as of September 1, 2023

Stefan Karajovanovic (born April 16, 1999) is a Canadian professional soccer player who plays as a forward.

== Early life ==
Karajovanovic began playing youth soccer with the Association Soccer de Hull. In 2015, he joined the Montreal Impact Academy, where he played for four months before joining the Ottawa Fury FC Academy, due to moving to Ottawa for school.

== University career ==
In 2017, he began attending Carleton University in Ottawa, where he played for the Ravens soccer team. He was named an OUA first-team all-star as a rookie. During his three seasons at Carleton, he scored 35 goals in 37 appearances.

== Club career ==
Karajovanovic was a member of the Ottawa Fury FC Academy, where he made his semi-professional debut in the Première Ligue de soccer du Québec playing five matches during the 2016 season, while also appearing in 11 reserve team games scoring four goals.

In 2017 and 2018, he played for FC Gatineau in the PLSQ. During the 2017 season, he broke his collarbone which limited him to five total combined appearances in which he scored four goals (two goals in two league appearances), but returned the following season with much greater success, scoring 14 goals in 12 games. He won the Ballon de bronze (Bronze Ball) as the league's third best player in 2018.

In 2019, he joined AS Blainville in the PLSQ, where he won the league championship.

He was selected 5th overall in the 2019 CPL–U Sports Draft by York9 FC of the Canadian Premier League. He trained with the club for five days, but the club did not have a roster spot for him, so he did not sign for the 2020 season. Afterwards, he joined Atlético Ottawa for training, but did not join them for the 2020 season either.

Instead for the 2020 season, he joined PLSQ club Ottawa South United, after switching over from defending champion Blainville.

At the 2021 CPL-U Sports Draft, he was selected seventh overall by the HFX Wanderers FC. In June, he signed with the club for the 2021 season. He made his debut on June 26, 2021, against Pacific FC. He scored his first professional goal on September 3 against Forge FC. He departed the club at the end of the season.

Several Canadian Premier League clubs expressed interest in him for the 2022 season, however, in March 2022, he chose to sign with Toronto FC II in MLS Next Pro, stating "when my eyes saw Toronto FC, I didn't think twice!". He scored his first goal on July 18 against Philadelphia Union II. He departed the club after the season, after the club declined his contract option.

In December 2022, it was announced that he would be going on trial with Serbian SuperLiga club FK Napredak Kruševac. Then, in February 2023, he went on trial with Pacific FC as part of their pre-season camp. In May 2023, he joined New Zealand club Napier City Rovers FC in the Central League and made his debut on May 7, 2023, recording an assist against the Wellington Phoenix FC Reserves. He helped the club qualify for the national New Zealand National League stage, but was not able to participate as he had to return to Canada to complete his university studies commitments.

In 2024, he played amateur soccer with Gloucester Celtic FC, helping them win their third Challenge Trophy, as Canadian national amateur champions, obtaining the tournament's Most Valuable Player leading Gloucester Celtic FC with three goals in five matches.

== Personal ==
His family is of Serbian origin. His grandfather played professional soccer in Bosnia and Serbia.

== Career statistics ==
As of match played on September 1, 2023

Club	Season	League			Playoffs		Domestic Cup		League Cup		Total	
Club	Season	Division	Apps	Goals	Apps	Goals	Apps	Goals	Apps	Goals	Apps	Goals
Ottawa Fury Academy	2016	Première Ligue de soccer du Québec	5	0	—		—		0	0	5	0
FC Gatineau	2017	Première Ligue de soccer du Québec	2	2	—		—		2	1	4	3
FC Gatineau	2018	Première Ligue de soccer du Québec	12	14	—		—		0	0	12	14
FC Gatineau	Total		14	16	0	0	0	0	2	1	16	17
A.S. Blainville	2019	Première Ligue de soccer du Québec	12	5	—		1	0	0	0	13	5
Ottawa South United	2020	Première Ligue de soccer du Québec	6	7	—		—		—		6	7
HFX Wanderers FC	2021	Canadian Premier League	26	1	0	0	1	0	—		26	1
Toronto FC II	2022	MLS Next Pro	19	2	0	0	—		—		19	2
Napier City Rovers FC	2023	Central League	12	7	—		3	3	—		10	8
Career total			94	41	0	0	5	3	2	1	100	45
