= 2021 CPL–U Sports Draft =

General information
- Sport: Soccer
- Date: January 29, 2021
- Time: 3:00 PM ET
- Networks: OneSoccer, Twitter, YouTube

Overview
- 16 total selections in 2 rounds
- League: Canadian Premier League
- Teams: 8
- First selection: Thomas Gardner, FC Edmonton

The 2021 CPL–U Sports Draft was the third annual CPL–U Sports Draft. Eight Canadian Premier League (CPL) teams selected 16 eligible U Sports athletes in total when the draft was held on January 29, 2021.

== Format ==
Each CPL team made two selection in the U Sports Draft. Players could be selected if they had years of U Sports eligibility remaining and had declared for the draft. In 2021, a total of 48 athletes declared for the draft.

The draft used a snake format with the order reversing directions between the two rounds. The selection order in the first round is the reverse of the previous season's standings.

== Player selection ==
^{*}	Denotes player who has signed a professional contract for the 2021 season
^{^}	Denotes player who has signed a developmental contract for the 2021 season

=== Round 1 ===
Pick #	CPL team	Player	Position	Nationality	University	Last team/academy
1	FC Edmonton	Thomas Gardner^	MF	Canada	British Columbia	TSS Rovers (USL2)
2	Atlético Ottawa	Cristopher Malekos	DF	Canada	Carleton	Ottawa South United (PLSQ)
3	Valour FC	Yuba-Rayane Yesli	GK	Algeria (Note: Qualifies as a domestic player)	Montréal	CS Fabrose (PLSQ)
4	York United	Christopher Campoli	MF	Canada	Ontario Tech	Woodbridge Strikers (L1O)
5	Pacific FC	Chris Lee^	DF	Canada	British Columbia	Vancouver Whitecaps FC Academy
6	Cavalry FC	Victor Loturi^	MF	Canada	Mount Royal	Cavalry FC (CPL)
7	HFX Wanderers	Stefan Karajovanovic*	FW	Canada	Carleton	Ottawa South United (PLSQ)
8	Forge FC	Garven-Michée Metusala*	DF	Canada	Concordia	AS Blainville (PLSQ)

=== Round 2 ===
Pick #	CPL team	Player	Position	Nationality	University	Last team/academy
9	Forge FC	José da Cunha	DF	Portugal	Cape Breton	(Portugal) G.D. Estoril Praia B
10	HFX Wanderers	Kareem Sow^	DF	Canada	Montréal	Montreal Impact Academy
11	Cavalry FC	Ethan Keen	DF	Canada	Mount Royal	Calgary Foothills (USL2)
12	Pacific FC	Victory Shumbusho	FW	DR Congo (Note: Qualifies as a domestic player)	British Columbia	Victoria Highlanders (USL2)
13	York United	Danial Rafisamii	MF	Canada	Ontario Tech	Toronto Skillz FC (L1O)
14	Valour FC	Tony Mikhael^	DF	Lebanon	Carleton	Ottawa South United (L1O)
15	Atlético Ottawa	Reggie Laryea	DF	Canada	York	Sigma FC (L1O)
16	FC Edmonton	Jackson Farmer	DF	Canada	British Columbia	Calgary Foothills (USL2)

=== Retained ===
The following players signed development contracts with their respective CPL teams in 2020 and had U Sports eligibility remaining. Their CPL clubs chose to retain their rights for another year, exempting them from the draft.

Drafted	CPL team	Player	Position	Nationality	University
2019 (7th)	Forge FC	Gabriel Balbinotti	FW	Canada	UQTR
2019 (14th)	HFX Wanderers	Jake Ruby	RB	Canada	Trinity Western

== Selection statistics ==
=== Draftees by nationality ===
Rank	Country	Selections
1	Canada	12
2	Algeria	1
2	DR Congo	1
2	Lebanon	1
2	Portugal	1

==== Canadian draftees by province ====
Rank	Province	Selections
1	Ontario	5 (Note: Mikhail's hometown is in Ontario, but represents Lebanon internationally)
2	Quebec	4 (Note: Yesli was born in Algeria, but resides in Quebec since his youth)
3	Alberta	3
3	British Columbia	3 (Note: Shumbusho was born in Congo, but resides in British Columbia since his youth)

=== Draftees by university ===
Rank	University	Selections
1	British Columbia	4
2	Carleton	3
3	Montréal	2
3	Ontario Tech	2
3	Mount Royal	2
6	Concordia	1
6	Cape Breton	1
6	York	1
