= 2027 CPL–U Sports Draft =

Ninth annual Canadian Premier League sports draft

General information
- Sport: Soccer
- Date: December 9, 2026
- Networks: OneSoccer; YouTube

Overview
- 16 total selections in 2 rounds
- League: Canadian Premier League
- Teams: 8
- First selection: Pacific FC

The 2027 CPL–U Sports Draft will be the ninth annual CPL–U Sports Draft. Canadian Premier League (CPL) teams will select 16 eligible U Sports soccer players to be invited to their respective preseason camps with the opportunity to earn development contracts for the 2027 Canadian Premier League season.

== Format ==
Players can be selected if they had one to four years of U Sports eligibility remaining, are in good academic standing, are planning to return to school the following year, and completed the CPL's draft declaration form. Players who are selected can sign a full professional contract or a U Sports development contract, which allows them to return to university for the following season, without losing their eligibility.

Players interested in being selected are required to declare for the draft by November 25, 2026.

Each CPL team was awarded two selections in the draft. The selections were awarded in reverse order of the previous season's standings, including playoffs and final standings.

== Broadcasting ==
The selection order and broadcast details for the draft will be announced at the conclusion of the 2026 CPL playoffs.
