= Matthew Durrans =

Canadian soccer player

Personal information
- Date of birth: 10 December 1998 (age 27)
- Place of birth: Vancouver, British Columbia, Canada
- Height: 1.82 m (6 ft 0 in)
- Position: Forward

Youth career
- West Van SC
- Mountain United
- Vancouver Whitecaps FC
- 2012–2016: 1860 Munich
- 2016–2017: FC Deisenhofen

Senior career*
Years	Team	Apps	(Gls)
2017–2018	VfR Garching	10	(1)
2019–2021	1860 Munich II	35	(8)
2020–2021	1860 Munich	2	(0)
2021	FC Edmonton	16	(0)
2022–2023	Pipinsried	3	(0)
2023	Austria Klagenfurt	0	(0)
- * Club domestic league appearances and goals as of January 5, 2023

Matthew Durrans (born 10 December 1998) is a Canadian professional soccer player who plays as a forward.

== Club career ==
=== Early career ===
Durrans began playing youth soccer at the age of three with West Van SC. He later played with Mountain United SC, later joining the Vancouver Whitecaps FC Academy. At the age of 14, Durrans moved to Germany and joined the academy of 1860 Munich. After spells away with FC Deisenhofen and Regionalliga Bayern side VfR Garching, Durrans returned to 1860 Munich in January 2019, signing a professional contract in August 2020. On 12 December 2020, he made his professional first team debut in the 3. Liga, coming on as a substitute in a 5–0 win over Waldhof Mannheim.

=== FC Edmonton ===
On 6 July 2021, Durrans returned to Canada, signing with Canadian Premier League side FC Edmonton.

=== Pipinsried ===
On 31 January 2022, Durrans signed with Regionalliga Bayern side FC Pipinsried. However, he only managed to play three games for the German club before being forced to spend the rest of the season on the sidelines, due to an Achilles tendon injury.

=== Austria Klagenfurt ===
After recovering from his injury and spending time on trial with Austria Klagenfurt, Durrans joined the Austrian club officially on 5 January 2023, signing a contract until June 2024.

== Career statistics ==
As of match played on 23 January 2021

Appearances and goals by club, season and competition
Club	Season	League			Cup		Total		Ref.
Club	Season	Division	Apps	Goals	Apps	Goals	Apps	Goals	Ref.
VfR Garching (loan)	2017–18	Regionalliga Bayern	10	1	—		10	1	
1860 Munich II	2018–19	Oberliga Bayern Süd	10	3	—		10	3	
1860 Munich II	2019–21	Oberliga Bayern Süd	25	5	—		25	5	
1860 Munich II	Total		35	8	—		35	8	—
1860 Munich	2020–21	3. Liga	1	0	0	0	1	0	
Career total			46	9	0	0	46	9	—
