= Kieran Baskett =

Canadian soccer player

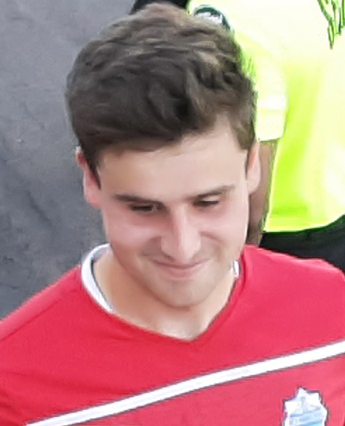
- Baskett in 2021

Personal information
- Full name: Kieran Joseph Roy Baskett
- Date of birth: September 27, 2001 (age 25)
- Place of birth: Halifax, Nova Scotia, Canada
- Height: 1.93 m (6 ft 4 in)
- Position: Goalkeeper

Team information
- Current team: Brattvåg (on loan from Lierse)
- Number: 1

Youth career
- 2006–2017: Halifax City SC
- 2018–2019: Baltimore Celtic SC

College career
Years	Team	Apps	(Gls)
2019	William & Mary Tribe	18	(0)

Senior career*
Years	Team	Apps	(Gls)
2021–2022	HFX Wanderers	19	(0)
2023	Pacific FC	10	(0)
2024	Brattvåg IL	24	(0)
2025–	Lierse	0	(0)
2025	→ SK Træff (loan)	8	(0)
2025–	→ Brattvåg IL (loan)	17	(0)
- * Club domestic league appearances and goals as of November 15, 2026

Kieran Joseph Roy Baskett (born September 27, 2001) is a Canadian soccer player who plays as a goalkeeper for Brattvåg IL in the Norwegian Second Division, on loan from Belgian Challenger Pro League club Lierse.

== Early life ==
Baskett began playing youth soccer at age four with Halifax City SC. He represented Nova Scotia at the 2017 Canada Summer Games. After attending Halifax Grammar School for the ninth and tenth grades, he moved to Baltimore in the United States, where he spent his final two years of high school at the McDonogh School, leading the soccer team to consecutive Maryland Interscholastic Athletic Association Conference championships and was a first-team all-state selection in 2018. While in Baltimore, he played club soccer with Baltimore Celtic SC, winning the golden glove at the US Youth Soccer National Championship in 2019.

== College career ==
In January 2019, Baskett committed to the College of William & Mary, where he would play for the men's soccer team beginning in the fall. He made his collegiate debut on August 30 against the High Point Panthers. During his freshman season, he was named the Colonial Athletic Association Defensive Player of the Week twice. Iniatially set to be the team's backup goalkeeper, he played every minute for the team during the 2019 season, leading the CAA in saves with 71, after the starter got injured before the season opener. In 2020, he was named to the CAA Commissioner's Academic Honor Roll.

After returning to Nova Scotia during the COVID-19 pandemic, he spent some time training with local club Suburban FC in 2020. After the 2020 season was cancelled due to the COVID-19 pandemic, Baskett departed the school to turn professional, after only playing one season with the school.

== Club career ==
In January 2021, he signed a one-year contract, with a club option for 2022, with his hometown team, the HFX Wanderers, in the Canadian Premier League. He made his first-team debut for the Wanderers on August 17, starting in goal against Blainville in a Canadian Championship match. After beginning the season as the backup keeper, he became the team's starter in the second half of the season, starting 10 of the team's final 12 games. On October 19, he saved a penalty kick during injury time to preserve a 0–0 draw with Cavalry FC, earning CPL Save of the Week honours. After the season, he re-signed with the club for the 2022 season, adding a club option for 2023. It was also announced that he would spend the off-season training with English side Coventry City Championship side. After the 2022 season, the club declined his club option for the following season.

In March 2023, he signed with Pacific FC. After the season, Baskett was released from the club, having made 10 appearances and keeping four clean sheets.

In January 2024, he signed with Brattvåg IL in the Norwegian Second Division.

In January 2025, Baskett joined Challenger Pro League club Lierse, signing a two-year deal with a club option for another year, before being subsequently loaned out to Norwegian Second Division side SK Træff. He was recalled by Lierse for the start of the 2025–26 season, having made nine appearances for SK Træff in all competitions. In September 2025, he was loaned out to Norwegian Second Division side Brattvåg IL. In July 2026, his loan was extended through the remainder of 2026.

== International career ==
In March 2016, he made his debut in the Canadian program, attending an identification camp for the Canada U15 team.

== Personal life ==
Baskett's mother, Gillian Hamilton, competed for Canada in the biathlon at the 1994 Winter Olympics. During the COVID-19 pandemic, Baskett worked at a testing clinic to administer COVID tests to identify people carrying the virus.

== Career statistics ==
As of September 26, 2025

Club	Season	League			Playoffs		Domestic Cup		Continental		Total	
Club	Season	Division	Apps	Goals	Apps	Goals	Apps	Goals	Apps	Goals	Apps	Goals
HFX Wanderers FC	2021	Canadian Premier League	10	0	–		2	0	–		12	0
HFX Wanderers FC	2022	Canadian Premier League	9	0	–		0	0	–		9	0
HFX Wanderers FC	Total		19	0	0	0	2	0	0	0	21	0
Pacific FC	2023	Canadian Premier League	10	0	0	0	1	0	–		11	0
Brattvåg IL	2024	Norwegian Second Division	24	0	–		1	0	–		25	0
Lierse	2025–26	Challenger Pro League	0	0	0	0	0	0	0	0	0	0
SK Træff (loan)	2025	Norwegian Second Division	8	0	–		2	0	–		10	0
Brattvåg IL (loan)	2025	Norwegian Second Division	3	0	–		0	0	–		3	0
Career total			64	0	0	0	6	0	0	0	70	0
