= Alessandro Riggi =

Canadian soccer player (born 1993)

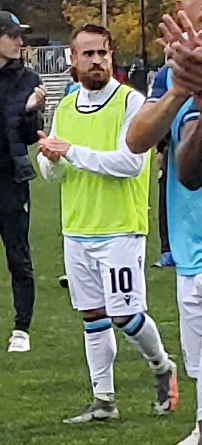
- Riggi with HFX Wanderers in 2021

Personal information
- Full name: Alessandro Leonardo Riggi
- Date of birth: November 30, 1993 (age 32)
- Place of birth: Montreal, Quebec, Canada
- Height: 1.62 m (5 ft 4 in)
- Position: Forward

Youth career
- Rivière-des-Prairies
- 2007–2008: Vancouver Whitecaps
- 2008–2011: Montreal Impact
- 2011–2012: Sampdoria
- 2012: Celta Vigo
- 2013: CFR Cluj

Senior career*
Years	Team	Apps	(Gls)
2010–2011	Montreal Impact Academy		
2012	Celta Vigo B		
2013	Atlético		
2013	CFR II Cluj		
2013–2014	Trento		
2015–2016	FC Montreal	48	(15)
2017–2019	Phoenix Rising	33	(6)
2020–2021	HFX Wanderers	23	(1)
2022	Valour FC	22	(3)
2023–2024	Angkor Tiger	24	(5)
2024	Davao Aguilas		
2025	Paro FC		

International career^{‡}
2012–2013	Canada U20	3	(0)
- * Club domestic league appearances and goals ‡ National team caps and goals as of May 3, 2015

Alessandro Riggi (born November 30, 1993) is a Canadian professional soccer player who plays as a forward.

== Early career ==
At age 14, Riggi joined the Vancouver Whitecaps FC Academy. A year later, after the Montreal Impact started their own youth program, he decided to join their program, as it was his hometown team.

Riggi played with the Montreal Impact Academy in the Canadian Soccer League from 2010 to 2011. He was top scorer and team MVP in his two seasons, but was unable to secure a first-team deal.

== Club career ==
After being unable to secure a first-team deal with Montreal, he went to Europe at age 19. He went on trial with Sampdoria in Italy, before joining the Celta Vigo academy. In January 2013, he signed in Portugal with Atletico Reguengos and in Romania with CFR Cluj. Afterwards, he joined Trento Calcio in Italy.

On March 13, 2015, it was announced that Riggi would join FC Montreal, the USL affiliate club of the Montreal Impact for their inaugural season. He made his professional debut for the club on March 28 in a 2–0 defeat to Toronto FC II.

On February 10, 2017, Riggi signed for USL club Phoenix Rising FC. Upon completion of the 2017 season, Riggi would re-sign with the club for the 2018 season. His time in Phoenix was marred by injuries, including a torn ACL that resulted in him being unable to play at all in 2019.

Riggi signed for HFX Wanderers FC of the Canadian Premier League on December 18, 2019. He made his debut on August 15 against Pacific FC. He played two seasons for the Wanderers. In the shortened 2020 season, he helped the team advance to the final, though they lost to defending champions Forge FC. In the 2021 season, Riggi struggled with injuries, appearing in 17 match but never going the full 90 minutes. At the end of the season, he announced that he was leaving the club, though he enjoyed his time in Halifax.

On February 9, 2022, Riggi signed with Valour FC. He departed the club at the end of the season.

In the summer of 2023, he went abroad to play in the Cambodian Premier League with Angkor Tiger. After a season in the Cambodian circuit, he joined Davao Aguilas in the Philippines Football League. In 2025, he signed with Paro FC in the Bhutan Premier League.

== Career statistics ==
Club	Season	Division		League		Playoffs		Domestic Cup		Total	
Club	Season	Level	Division	Apps	Goals	Apps	Goals	Apps	Goals	Apps	Goals
Montreal Impact Academy	2010	3	Canadian Soccer League	?	?	—		—		?	?
Montreal Impact Academy	2011	3	Canadian Soccer League	?	10	?	?	—		?	10
Celta de Vigo B	2012–13	4	Tercera División	?	?	—		—		?	?
Atlético S.C.	2012–13	4	Terceira Divisão	1	0	—		?	?	1	0
Trento	2013–14	5	Eccellenza	?	?	—		?	?	?	?
FC Montreal	2015	2	USL	25	9	—		—		25	9
FC Montreal	2016	2	USL	22	6	—		—		22	6
Phoenix Rising FC	2017	2	USL	20	4	1	0	0	0	21	4
Phoenix Rising FC	2018	2	USL	14	2	0	0	1	0	15	2
Phoenix Rising FC	2019	2	USL Championship	0	0	0	0	0	0	0	0
Phoenix Rising FC	Total			81	21	1	0	1	0	83	21
HFX Wanderers FC	2020	1	Canadian Premier League	7	1	1	0	—		8	1
HFX Wanderers FC	2021	1	Canadian Premier League	16	0	0	0	1	0	17	0
HFX Wanderers FC	Total			23	1	1	0	1	0	25	1
Career total				88	22	2	0	1	0	91	22

== Honours ==
HFX Wanderers

- Canadian Premier League runner-up: 2020
