= Thomas Gardner (soccer) =

Canadian soccer player (born 1998)

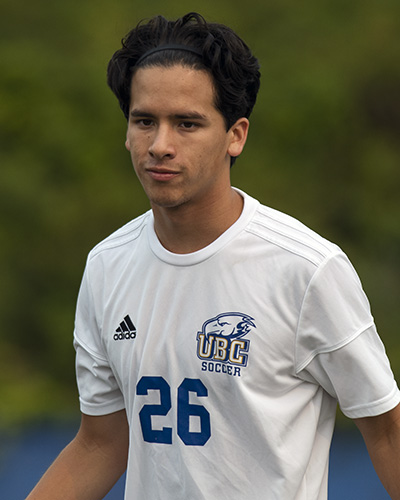

Personal information
- Date of birth: March 17, 1998 (age 28)
- Place of birth: North Vancouver, British Columbia, Canada
- Height: 1.76 m (5 ft 9 in)
- Position: Midfielder

Youth career
- 2007–2015: Vancouver Whitecaps FC

College career
Years	Team	Apps	(Gls)
2018–2022	UBC Thunderbirds	66	(13)

Senior career*
Years	Team	Apps	(Gls)
2015–2017	Whitecaps FC 2	40	(0)
2018	TSS FC Rovers	6	(1)
2021	FC Edmonton	10	(0)
2022	Varsity FC		
- * Club domestic league appearances and goals as of September 21, 2021 ‡ National team caps and goals as of October 13, 2015

Thomas Gardner (born March 17, 1998) is a Canadian professional soccer player who plays as a midfielder.

== Club career ==
=== Whitecaps FC 2 ===
Gardner signed with Whitecaps FC 2 on August 26, 2015. He made his professional debut 11 days later against Sacramento Republic FC. Gardner, along with fellow Whitecaps Academy products Matthew Baldisimo and Kadin Chung were praised during the club's USL playoff run in the 2016 USL season. In December 2016, Whitecaps FC 2 announced that Gardner would return to the club for the 2017 season. He played three seasons with Whitecaps FC 2 before the club ceased operations after the 2017 season. Rather than sign a USL deal with the Whitecaps new affiliate, Fresno FC, Gardner elected to evaluate playing opportunities in college.

=== TSS FC Rovers ===
After three seasons with Whitecaps FC 2, Gardner signed with TSS FC Rovers of the Premier Development League for the 2018 season.

=== Pacific FC ===
On November 12, 2018, Gardner was selected 6th overall by Pacific FC in the Canadian Premier League's inaugural U Sports draft. However he sustained a knee injury shortly after being drafted and was unable to play for three months, resulting in him not signing with Pacific. So, he went back to the University of British Columbia and played in the 2019 U Sports season. He was once again selected 12th overall by Pacific FC in the 2019 CPL–U Sports Draft.

=== FC Edmonton ===
In the 2021 CPL-U Sports Draft, he was selected first overall by FC Edmonton. On March 23, 2021, Gardner signed a development contract with the club. Gardner appeared in 10 games with the Eddies before returning to the University of British Columbia.

=== Varsity FC ===
In 2022, Gardner joined Varsity FC in League1 British Columbia.

== International career ==
Gardner qualifies to play for Canada, where he and his father were born, or Indonesia, where his mother was born.

In 2013, Gardner participated in U-15 evaluation camps for the Canadian men's program and played in the Copa Mexico de Naciones Sub-15. The following year, he participated in camps for the Canadian U17 team and played at the 2014 Tournoi Montaigu. He subsequently participated in another U17 camp in 2015, but was not called up for competitive matches.
