= 2019 CPL–U Sports Draft =

General information
- Sport: Soccer
- Date: November 11, 2019
- Time: 7:30 pm ET
- Location: Montreal, Quebec
- Networks: CanPL.ca, IGTV, YouTube

Overview
- 14 total selections in 2 rounds
- League: Canadian Premier League
- Teams: 7
- First selection: Cory Bent, HFX Wanderers

The 2019 CPL–U Sports Draft was the second annual CPL–U Sports Draft. It was held on November 11, 2019 in Montreal, Quebec. Seven Canadian Premier League (CPL) teams selected 14 eligible U Sports athletes in total.

== Format ==
Each CPL team will make two selection in the U Sports Draft. Players can be selected if they have years of U Sports eligibility remaining and have declared for the draft.

For the non-finalist teams, the CPL combined standings were used to determine the order for the first round, with last-placed HFX Wanderers FC selecting first. Finals runner-up Cavalry FC selected sixth, while champions Forge FC selected seventh. A "snake draft" was used, with the order reversing in the second round.

== Player selection ==
| ^{*} | Denotes player who has signed a professional contract for the 2020 season |
| ^{^} | Denotes player who has signed a developmental contract for the 2020 season |

=== Round 1 ===
| Pick # | CPL team | Player | Position | Nationality | University |
|---|---|---|---|---|---|
| 1 | HFX Wanderers | Cory Bent* | LW | England | Cape Breton |
| 2 | Valour FC | Marcus Campanile | CAM | Scotland | Cape Breton |
| 3 | Pacific FC | Jan Pirretas Glasmacher | CB | Spain | Thompson Rivers |
| 4 | FC Edmonton | David Chung | CM | Canada | Alberta |
| 5 | York9 FC | Stefan Karajovanovic | ST | Canada | Carleton |
| 6 | Cavalry FC | Gabriel Bitar | ST | Canada | Carleton |
| 7 | Forge FC | Gabriel Balbinotti^ | FW | Canada | UQTR |

=== Round 2 ===
| Pick # | CPL team | Player | Position | Nationality | University |
|---|---|---|---|---|---|
| 8 | Forge FC | Alex Zis | CAM | Canada | Guelph |
| 9 | Cavalry FC | Moe El Gandour | CM | Canada | Mount Royal |
| 10 | York9 FC | Isaiah Johnston* | RM | Canada | Cape Breton |
| 11 | FC Edmonton | Jakob Bosch | CM | Canada | Alberta |
| 12 | Pacific FC | Thomas Gardner | FW | Canada | British Columbia |
| 13 | Valour FC | Charlie Waters | ST | England | Cape Breton |
| 14 | HFX Wanderers | Jake Ruby^ | RB | Canada | Trinity Western |

== Selection statistics ==
=== Draftees by nationality ===
| Rank | Country | Selections |
|---|---|---|
| 1 | Canada | 10 |
| 2 | England | 2 |
| 3 | Scotland | 1 |
| 3 | Spain | 1 |

==== Canadian draftees by province ====
| Rank | Province | Selections |
|---|---|---|
| 1 | Alberta | 3 |
| 1 | Ontario | 3 |
| 3 | British Columbia | 2 |
| 3 | Quebec | 2 |

=== Draftees by university ===
| Rank | University | Selections |
|---|---|---|
| 1 | Cape Breton | 4 |
| 2 | Alberta | 2 |
| 2 | Carleton | 2 |
| 4 | Mount Royal | 1 |
| 4 | Thompson Rivers | 1 |
| 4 | Trinity Western | 1 |
| 4 | UQTR | 1 |
| 4 | British Columbia | 1 |
| 4 | Guelph | 1 |
