= Jake Ruby =

Canadian soccer player

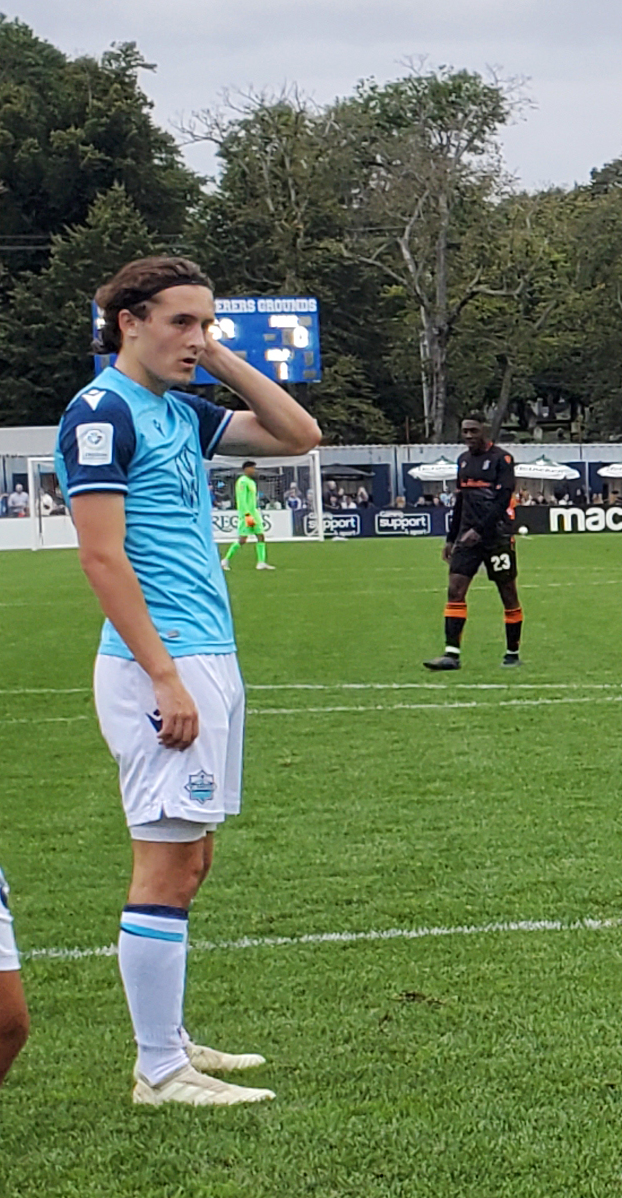
- Ruby with HFX Wanderers in 2021

Personal information
- Date of birth: June 4, 2000 (age 26)
- Place of birth: Vancouver, British Columbia, Canada
- Height: 1.78 m (5 ft 10 in)
- Position: Full-back

Youth career
- Lynn Valley SA
- Mountain United FC
- 2016–2018: Vancouver Whitecaps FC

College career
Years	Team	Apps	(Gls)
2019	Trinity Western Spartans	17	(3)

Senior career*
Years	Team	Apps	(Gls)
2019	Victoria Highlanders	9	(0)
2020–2023	HFX Wanderers	42	(1)

International career^{‡}
2016–2017	Canada U17	5	(0)
- * Club domestic league appearances and goals as of October 6, 2023 ‡ National team caps and goals as of August 15, 2020

Jake Ruby (born June 4, 2000) is a Canadian professional soccer player who plays as a full-back.

== Early life ==
Ruby began playing youth soccer at age seven with Lynn Valley SA. Afterwards, he played for Mountain United FC, before joining the Vancouver Whitecaps Academy in 2016. In 2018, he participated in the first team's 2018 pre-season, as well as other first team training sessions. He departed the Whitecaps Academy in 2018, heading to Germany, where he had a month-long trial with 1. FC Nürnberg. He then began playing at the senior amateur level with NVFC Norvan in the Vancouver Metro Soccer League.

== University career ==
In 2019, he began attending Trinity Western University, where he played for the men's soccer team. He scored his first goal on October 11, 2019 against the UFV Cascades. In his rookie season, he was named the TWU's Male Rookie of the Year, across all sports. He was also named a Canada West Second Team All-Star, as well as being named to the Canada West All-Rookie Team and the U SPORTS All-Rookie Team.

== Club career ==
In April 2019, he signed with the Victoria Highlanders in USL League Two.

In November 2019, Ruby was selected 14th overall by HFX Wanderers in the 2019 CPL–U Sports Draft. In July 2020, he signed a U Sports contract with the Wanderers, which would allow him to maintain his university eligibility. In his debut season, he helped the Wanderers reach the CPL finals, where they were defeated by Forge FC. In February 2021, he returned to the Wanderers on a fully professional contract for 2021, with club options for an additional two seasons, planning to finish his post-secondary education in Halifax. He scored his first goal on August 7, 2021 against York United. In January 2022, the Wanderers picked up his option for the 2022 season. In January 2023, after having previously exercised his contract option for 2023, the club signed him to a new extension for the 2023 season, with options for 2024 and 2025. In December 2023, the Wanderers declined his option for 2024.

== International career ==
In October 2016, Ruby made his debut in the Canadian national program, participating in a Canadian under-17 team camp and a month later played in a friendly series with the team in Jamaica. He made his international debut on November 27, 2016 against Jamaica U17, earning man of the match honours. In May 2017, he was named to the roster for the 2017 CONCACAF U-17 Championship, where he started all three of the team's matches. In 2018, he was named to the Canada U21 team for the 2018 Toulon Tournament, but he was forced to withdraw due to injury.

== Career statistics ==
As of October 14, 2023

Club	Season	League			Playoffs		Domestic Cup		Continental		Total	
Club	Season	Division	Apps	Goals	Apps	Goals	Apps	Goals	Apps	Goals	Apps	Goals
Victoria Highlanders FC	2019	USL League Two	9	0	—		—		—		9	0
HFX Wanderers FC	2020	Canadian Premier League	8	0	0	0	—		—		8	0
HFX Wanderers FC	2021	Canadian Premier League	16	1	—		1	0	—		17	1
HFX Wanderers FC	2022	Canadian Premier League	10	0	—		0	0	—		10	0
HFX Wanderers FC	2023	Canadian Premier League	8	0	1	0	0	0	—		9	0
HFX Wanderers FC	Total		42	1	1	0	1	0	0	0	44	1
Career total			51	1	1	0	1	0	0	0	53	1
