= Cory Bent =

English footballer

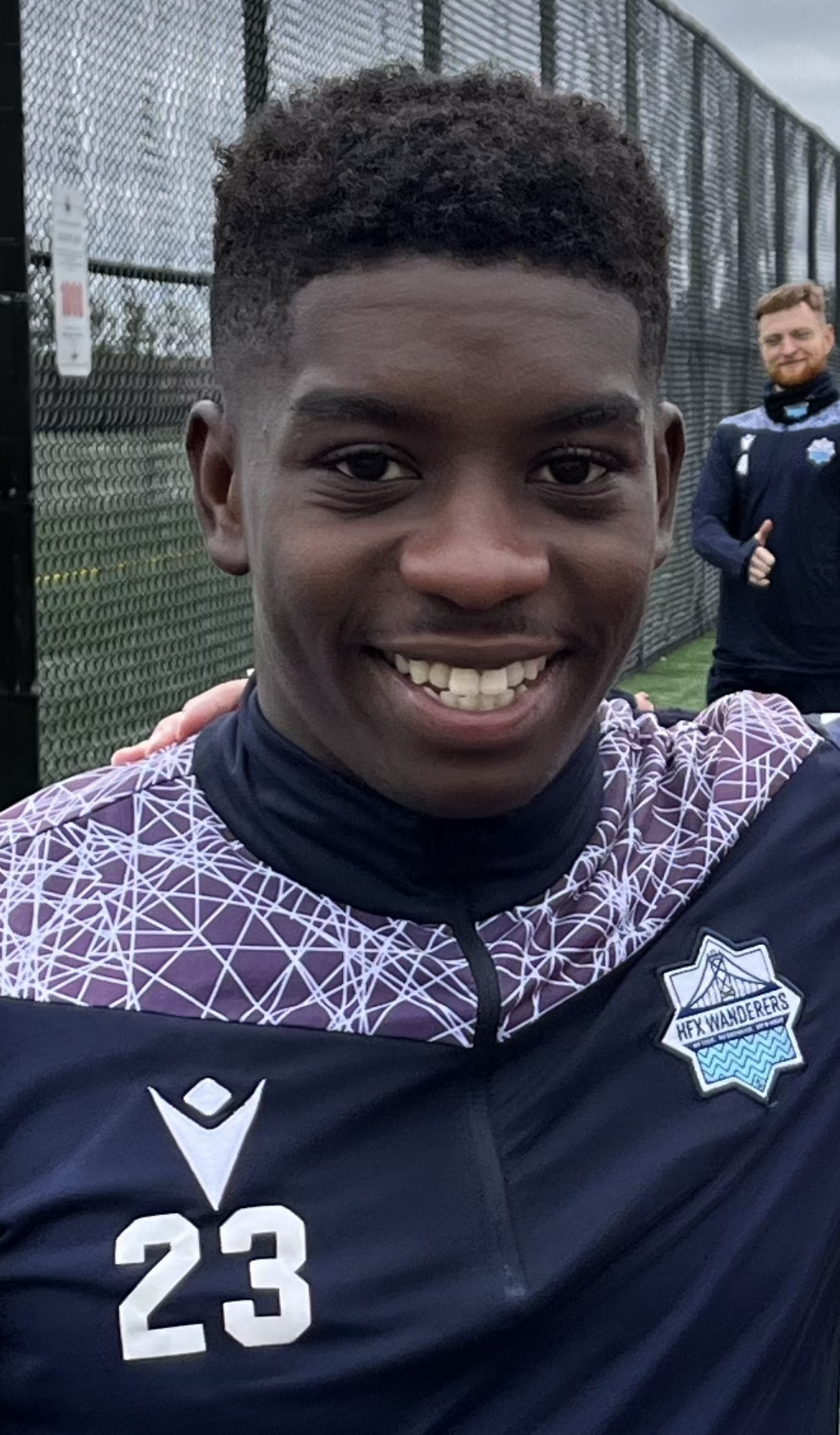
- Bent with HFX Wanderers in 2022

Personal information
- Full name: Cory Bent
- Date of birth: 14 May 1997 (age 29)
- Place of birth: Manchester, England
- Position: Forward

Team information
- Current team: Suburban Football Club
- Number: 88

Youth career
- 2005–2006: Manchester United
- 2006–2011: Preston North End
- 2012–2014: AFC Fylde

College career
Years	Team	Apps	(Gls)
2016–2019	CBU Capers	46	(24)

Senior career*
Years	Team	Apps	(Gls)
2014–2015	AFC Fylde	4	(0)
2015	→ Clitheroe (loan)		
2015	Lancaster City		
2016	Longridge Town		
2018	Victoria Highlanders	10	(2)
2019	Calgary Foothills	9	(2)
2020–2022	HFX Wanderers	47	(3)

Managerial career
- Suburban Football Club U13 Academy
- * Club domestic league appearances and goals as of December 6, 2022

Cory Bent (born 14 May 1997) is an English professional footballer.

== Early life ==
Bent was born in Manchester and grew up in Preston, Lancashire. He began playing football at age six, and spent a year with the academy of Premier League giants Manchester United at the under-8 level. The following year, he switched to the academy of EFL Championship side Preston North End, where he played until the age of fourteen.

== Club career ==
=== AFC Fylde ===
After a year out of the game following his release from Preston North End, Bent joined the reserve side of National League North club AFC Fylde, where he eventually signed for the first team. On 2 December 2014, Bent made his senior debut for the club as an 89th-minute substitute against Stockport County. He made a total of three appearances that season, all as a substitute.

In early 2015, Bent went on loan with Northern Premier League side Clitheroe. Bent subsequently signed with NPL side Lancaster City in August 2015 after making one appearance for Fylde in the new season. Later that season, he played for West Lancashire Premier League side Longridge Town.

=== Cape Breton University ===
In 2016, Bent moved to Canada to attend Cape Breton University, where he played varsity football for the Capers. In four seasons at CBU, Bent made 46 appearances and scored 24 goals. In 2017, he won the U Sports Championship in 2017 and was named finals MVP. He was named to the U Sports All-Canadian first team in 2018 and 2019.

In summer 2018, Bent played for USL PDL side Victoria Highlanders, scoring two goals in ten appearances. The following summer, he played for defending PDL champions Calgary Foothills, scoring two goals in nine league appearances and making one additional appearance in the playoffs.

=== HFX Wanderers ===
On 11 November 2019, Bent was selected first overall by HFX Wanderers in the 2019 CPL–U Sports Draft. On 4 May 2020, he signed his first professional contract with Wanderers. He made his professional debut on August 15 against Pacific FC. In January 2022, HFX announced they were exercising Bent's contract option, keeping him at the club through 2022. Upon the expiration of his contract after the 2022 season, Bent left the club.

== Personal life ==
Born in England, Bent is of Jamaican descent. He is the son of former footballer Junior Bent, as well as a cousin of former footballer Darren Bent.

== Career statistics ==
As of 9 October 2022

Appearances and goals by club, season and competition
Club	Season	League			National Cup		Other (Note: Includes appearances in the USL League Two Playoffs.)		Total	
Club	Season	Division	Apps	Goals	Apps	Goals	Apps	Goals	Apps	Goals
AFC Fylde	2014–15	Conference North	3	0	0	0	0	0	3	0
AFC Fylde	2015–16	National League North	1	0	0	0	0	0	1	0
AFC Fylde	Total		4	0	0	0	0	0	4	0
Victoria Highlanders	2018	USL PDL	10	2	—		0	0	10	2
Calgary Foothills	2019	USL League Two	9	2	—		1	0	10	2
HFX Wanderers	2020	Canadian Premier League	9	1	—		1	0	10	1
HFX Wanderers	2021	Canadian Premier League	19	0	2	2	—		21	2
HFX Wanderers	2022	Canadian Premier League	19	2	1	0	—		20	2
HFX Wanderers	Total		47	3	3	2	1	0	51	5
Career total			70	7	3	2	2	0	75	9
