= Ibrahima Sanoh =

Guinean professional footballer (born 1994)

Ibra Sanoh
Personal information
- Full name: Ibrahima Sanoh
- Date of birth: 11 April 1994 (age 32)
- Place of birth: Conakry, Guinea
- Height: 1.88 m (6 ft 2 in)
- Position: Striker

College career
| Years | Team | Apps | (Gls) |
| 2012 | UPEI Panthers | 11 | (2) |
| 2014–2017 | Holland Hurricanes | 70 | (101) |

Senior career*
| Years | Team | Apps | (Gls) |
| 2020 | HFX Wanderers | 5 | (1) |
- * Club domestic league appearances and goals as of 15 September 2020

Ibrahima Sanoh (born 11 April 1994) is a Guinean former footballer.

== Early life ==
Born in Guinea, Sanoh moved to Canada in 2011 to attend school and learn English. In 2014, he played at the amateur level with Sherwood-Parkdale Rangers SC Bayern. In 2019, he played with PEI FC.

== College career ==
He began attending the University of Prince Edward Island, but was not able to play for the men's soccer team in his first year, but did train with the team. He began playing for the soccer team in 2012, scoring in his first game for the team in a 3–1 victory over the Mount Allison Mounties on September 8, 2012, also earning the team's rookie of the year honours that season. He then took the following year off.

In 2014, he began attending Holland College. In his four seasons, he was named a CCAA All-Canadian and the Atlantic Collegiate Athletic Association player of the year four years in a row. He was named an all-star at the national tournament in 2015. In February 2017, he was named the PEI Soccer Association Male Athlete of the Year for 2016. In his fourth season with Holland in 2017, he helped them win bronze at the national championships, after having won four conference titles. That season, he was named the Canadian Collegiate Athletic Association Player of the Year, becoming the first Holland player to earn the honour in any sport. He was also named the school's Male Athlete of the Year on two occasions - the 2014/15 season and 2017/18 season. In his time with Holland, he scored a record 101 goals in 70 games played.

== Club career ==
In January 2018, Sanoh attended a combine with the coaches of Major League Soccer club Toronto FC, returning a couple of weeks later to trial with the second team, Toronto FC II.

Sanoh appeared in a friendly for the HFX Wanderers FC Atlantic Selects team (which occurred prior to the Wanderers formal professional launch in 2019) in 2018 against Fortuna Düsseldorf's U-21 team, scoring a goal in the match.

In December 2019, he signed a professional contract with HFX Wanderers FC of the Canadian Premier League. The club waited for his Canadian permanent residency paperwork to be finalized before officially signing his, allowing him to count as a domestic player for roster purposes. He made his professional debut on August 15 as a substitute against Pacific FC, also scoring his first goal on a penalty kick in a 2–2 draw. After the 2020 season, he was released by the club.
