= Mateo Restrepo =

Canadian soccer player (born 1997)

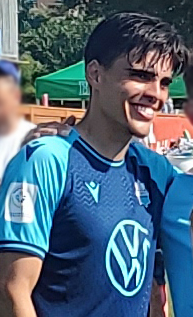
- Restrepo in 2022 with HFX Wanderers FC

Personal information
- Full name: Mateo Restrepo Mejia
- Date of birth: April 29, 1997 (age 29)
- Place of birth: La Ceja, Colombia
- Height: 1.78 m (5 ft 10 in)
- Position: Defender

Youth career
- Toronto Sporting
- Woodbridge Strikers
- 2011–2015: Toronto FC
- 2015–2016: FC Ingolstadt

College career
Years	Team	Apps	(Gls)
2016–2019	UC Santa Barbara Gauchos	66	(0)

Senior career*
Years	Team	Apps	(Gls)
2014–2015	Toronto FC III		
2015	Toronto FC II	1	(0)
2020–2022	HFX Wanderers	34	(0)

International career^{‡}
2012	Canada U17		
2014–2015	Canada U18		
- * Club domestic league appearances and goals as of July 21, 2022 ‡ National team caps and goals as of 28 July 2016

Mateo Restrepo Mejia (born April 29, 1997) is a former soccer player. Born in Colombia, he represented Canada internationally at the U17 and U18 levels.

== Early life ==
Restrepo was born in La Ceja, Colombia, and lived there until the age of five, when his family moved to Canada to improve their quality of life and the chance at a better education for Restrepo. He began playing soccer at the age of six with Toronto Sporting, later playing for the Woodbridge Strikers. At age 13/14, he was invited to try out for the Ontario provincial team, which he ended up captaining and leading the U15 Ontario Provincial team to a National Championship in 2012. He then joined the Toronto FC Academy in 2011, where he played for three years. He was elevated to the junior team in 2012 that played in the Second Division of the Canadian Soccer League. In 2014, he had a training stint in England with the Brentford F.C. academy.

With the Toronto FC Academy, he played in League1 Ontario and the Premier Development League. In his team's first ever game in League1 Ontario, he received the league's first ever red card in a match against Vaughan Azzurri on May 30. He helped them win the 2014 League1 Ontario title and was named to the 2014 League1 Ontario Top XI at the conclusion.

In 2015, Restrepo joined the academy of German side FC Ingolstadt 04, playing in the Under 19 Bundesliga, after being noticed with his national team participation.

== College career ==
Restrepo enrolled for college at the University of California, Santa Barbara, where he played for the men's soccer team from 2016 to 2019. He made his debut in a on August 26, 2016, against the Oakland Golden Grizzlies, recording an assist. In his junior season, he took some time off from the team to focus on academics, due to the rigorous course load he was taking, as a result of his career goal of becoming a doctor. He served as team captain in is senior season, helping the team reach the quarter-finals of the 2019 NCAA Division I Men's Soccer Tournament. Over his four seasons, he made 66 appearances for Santa Barbara.

== Club career ==
Restrepo made his professional debut for Toronto FC II on March 28, 2015, on an academy contract, when he was brought on as a substitute in a United Soccer League match against FC Montreal.

On January 22, 2020, Restrepo signed with Canadian Premier League side HFX Wanderers. He made his first appearance for HFX on August 15, coming on as a substitute against Pacific FC. In late July, it was announced that he would depart the club and professional soccer to attend the Icahn School of Medicine at Mount Sinai. In his final match on July 23 on FC Edmonton, he was given the captain's armband to serve as team captain for the match. He made 37 appearances for the Wanderers, across all competitions.

== International career ==
Restrepo made his debut with the Canadian youth national teams in 2011 at the age of 14. He joined the Canada men's national under-17 soccer team in 2012 for the Torneo della Nazioni. He was elevated to the Canada men's national under-18 soccer team in 2014 and featured for the U-18's for two years.
