= Alex De Carolis =

Canadian soccer player (born 1992)

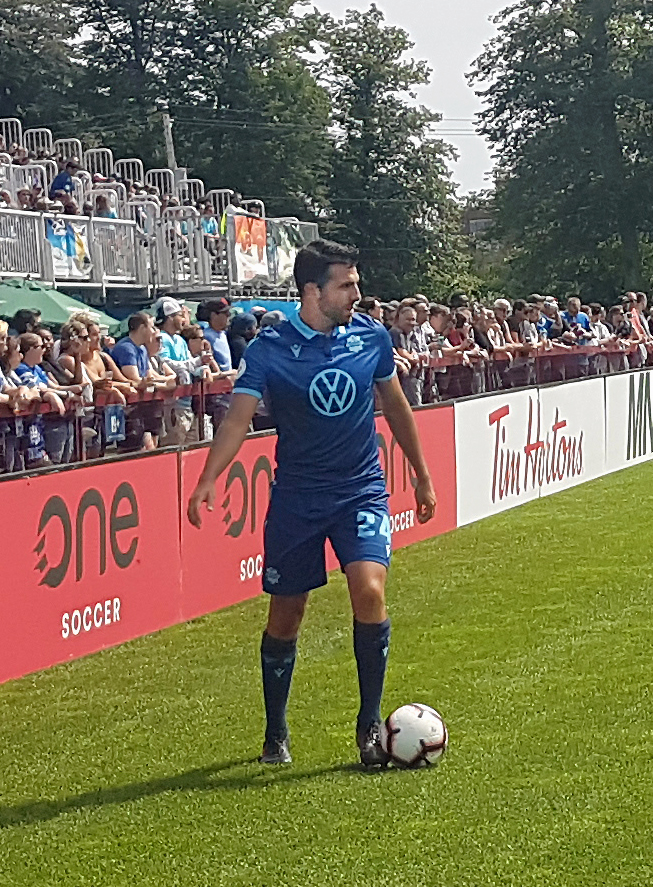
- De Carolis with HFX Wanderers in 2019

Personal information
- Date of birth: 24 September 1992 (age 34)
- Place of birth: Sarnia, Ontario, Canada
- Height: 1.85 m (6 ft 1 in)
- Position: Defender

Team information
- Current team: IFK Eskilstuna

Youth career
- Bluewater
- Sarnia Fury

College career
Years	Team	Apps	(Gls)
2012–2015	Canisius Golden Griffins	70	(8)

Senior career*
Years	Team	Apps	(Gls)
2014	FC London		
2015	Seattle Sounders U23		
2016	Nora BK	18	(2)
2017	Västerås SK	14	(223)
2018	Umeå FC	23	(0)
2019–2020	HFX Wanderers	23	(1)
2021–	IFK Eskilstuna	14	(0)
- * Club domestic league appearances and goals as of 12 January 2022

Alex De Carolis (born 24 September 1992) a Canadian professional soccer player who plays as a defender for Swedish club IFK Eskilstuna.

== Club career ==
=== Early career ===
De Carolis began playing soccer in Sarnia with local clubs Bluewater SC and Sarnia Fury. From 2012 to 2015, De Carolis attended Canisius College and in 2014 played for Premier Development League side FC London. In 2015, he played for Seattle Sounders FC U-23 and made the semi-finals of the PDL Championship.

In February 2016, De Carolis signed with Swedish Division 3 side Nora BK.

=== Västerås SK ===
On 7 March 2017, De Carolis signed with Swedish Division 1 side Västerås SK. That season, he made fourteen league appearances for Västerås, scoring two goals.

=== Umeå FC ===
On 24 January 2018, De Carolis signed with Swedish Division 1 side Umeå FC. He made 23 appearances for Umeå that season, including nine starts.

=== HFX Wanderers ===
On 20 February 2019, De Carolis returned to Canada and signed with Canadian Premier League side HFX Wanderers. He made his debut on 11 May, in a 1–0 loss to Valour FC. In November 2020, De Carolis and the Wanderers agreed to mutually part ways.

=== IFK Eskilstuna ===
On 14 March 2021, De Carolis returned to Sweden, signing with Division 2 side IFK Eskilstuna.

== Honours ==
HFX Wanderers

- Canadian Premier League
  - Runners-up: 2020
