= Omar Kreim =

Moroccan former professional footballer (born 1995)

Personal information
- Full name: Omar Kreim
- Date of birth: 10 February 1995 (age 31)
- Place of birth: Casablanca, Morocco
- Height: 1.73 m (5 ft 8 in)
- Position: Midfielder

Youth career
- 2009–2010: Braves D'Ahuntsic
- 2011: CS Monteuil
- 2012–2014: FS Salaberry

College career
Years	Team	Apps	(Gls)
2013–2014	Montmorency Nomades		
2016–2019	Montreal Carabins		

Senior career*
Years	Team	Apps	(Gls)
2015–2017	FS Salaberry	37	(6)
2019	A.S. Blainville	11	(0)
2020–2021	HFX Wanderers	16	(1)
- * Club domestic league appearances and goals as of 22 October 2021

Omar Kreim (born 10 February 1995) is a former professional footballer who played as a midfielder.

== Early life ==
Kreim was born in Casablanca, Morocco and moved to Montreal, Quebec at age seven. He played youth soccer with FS Salaberry in Quebec. He then joined their senior team in the top amateur division, Ligue de soccer élite du Québec, winning the LSEQ Ballon d'Or in 2016, while also attending the Université de Montréal, playing for the Carabins men's soccer team. In 2017, he repeated as the LSEQ Ballon d'Or winner and also won the provincial university title with the Carabins. In 2018, he captured the national title with the Carabins, earning MVP honours.

== Club career ==
In 2019, he played with AS Blainville in the Première Ligue de soccer du Québec.

Shortly after graduating university, on 28 November 2019, Kreim signed his first professional contract with Canadian Premier League side HFX Wanderers. However, his debut was delayed due to the COVID-19 pandemic, which postponed the start of the 2020 CPL season. On August 30, he scored his first goal, scoring a free kick in stoppage time to earn his team a point in a 1–1 draw against York9 FC. He re-signed with the club for the 2021 season. He retired after the 2021 season, due to injury issues, after suffering a concussion early in the 2021 season.

== Personal ==
Kreim graduated from the Université de Montréal with a law degree.

== Honours ==
HFX Wanderers

- Canadian Premier League runner-up: 2020
