= Scott Firth (soccer) =

Canadian professional soccer player

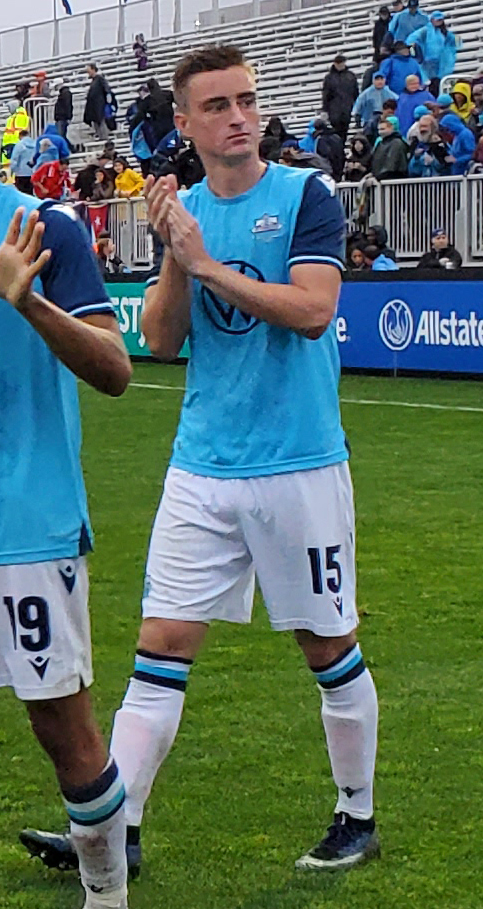
- Firth with HFX Wanderers in 2021

Personal information
- Date of birth: 2 March 2001 (age 25)
- Place of birth: Halifax, Nova Scotia, Canada
- Height: 1.85 m (6 ft 1 in)
- Position: Midfielder

Youth career
- Suburban FC

Senior career*
Years	Team	Apps	(Gls)
2019–2021	HFX Wanderers	20	(0)
- * Club domestic league appearances and goals as of 22 November 2021

Scott Firth (born 2 March 2001) is a Canadian professional soccer player who plays as a midfielder.

== Club career ==
=== Early career ===
Before turning pro, Firth played youth soccer for local club Suburban FC. In 2015 and 2016 he had trials with Portuguese clubs Sporting CP and Benfica. In 2018 Firth was invited back for a second trial with Toronto FC of Major League Soccer.

=== HFX Wanderers ===
On 30 January 2019, Firth signed his first professional contract with his hometown club, HFX Wanderers, becoming the first Nova Scotian to sign for the new Canadian Premier League side. On 4 May 2019, Firth made his debut as a substitute in the club's inaugural home match. He made eight league appearances that season and one in the Canadian Championship. On 19 November 2019, Firth re-signed with Halifax for the 2020 season. He departed the club at the end of the 2021 season.

== Honours ==
HFX Wanderers

- Canadian Premier League
  - Runners-up: 2020
