= 2021 York United FC season =

York United FC
2021 season
- Chairman: Mike Baldassarra
- Head coach: Jim Brennan
- Stadium: York Lions Stadium
- Canadian Premier League: 4th
- CPL playoffs: Semi-finals
- Canadian Championship: Quarter-finals
Home colours	Away colours

The 2021 York United FC season was the third season in the club's history, and their first competing under the name York United FC.

== Squad ==
As of November 9, 2021.

No.	Player	Nationality	Position(s)	Date of birth (age)	Previous club
Goalkeepers
1	Niko Giantsopoulos	(Canada)	GK	June 24, 1994 (aged 27)	(Canada) Cavalry FC
18	Eleias Himaras	(Canada)	GK	March 8, 2002 (aged 19)	(Canada) Toronto FC Academy
29	Nathan Ingham	(Canada)	GK	June 27, 1993 (aged 28)	(United States) Pittsburgh Riverhounds SC
Defenders
3	Matteo Campagna	(Canada)	CB / DM	June 4, 2004 (aged 17)	(Canada) Vancouver Whitecaps FC
4	Jordan Wilson	(Canada)	CB / FB / DM	October 3, 1991 (aged 30)	(Denmark) Nykøbing FC
5	Dominick Zator	(Canada)	CB	September 18, 1994 (aged 27)	(Canada) Cavalry FC
6	Roger Thompson	(Canada)	CB	December 19, 1991 (aged 30)	(Sweden) Ljungskile SK
20	Diyaeddine Abzi	(Canada)	LB	November 23, 1998 (aged 23)	(Canada) A.S. Blainville
42	Ryan Lindsay	(Canada)	CB / DM	December 4, 2001 (aged 20)	(Croatia) Dinamo Zagreb
66	Chrisnovic N'sa	(Canada)	CB / RB	January 28, 1999 (aged 22)	(Canada) HFX Wanderers
Midfielders
8	Sebastian Gutierrez (Note: Player is signed, but hasn't been added to the 2021 roster because of difficulties getting into Canada due to the COVID-19 pandemic)	(Colombia)	AM	September 29, 1997 (aged 24)	(Colombia) Llaneros
10	Mateo Hernández (out on loan)	(Argentina)	AM / LW / RW	October 5, 1998 (aged 23)	(Argentina) Colón
12	Javier George	(Guyana)	CM	January 27, 2001 (aged 20)	(France) Stade Beaucairois
14	Ijah Halley	(Canada)	RW / RB	August 14, 2001 (aged 20)	(Canada) Toronto FC Academy
16	Max Ferrari	(Canada)	CM	August 20, 2000 (aged 21)	(Canada) Aurora FC
19	Noah Verhoeven	(Canada)	CM	June 15, 1999 (aged 22)	(Canada) Pacific FC
21	Michael Petrasso	(Canada)	LW / RW	July 9, 1995 (aged 26)	(Canada) Valour FC
23	Gerard Lavergne	(Dominican Republic)	CM	January 25, 1999 (aged 22)	(United States) FC Tucson
28	Cédric Toussaint	(Canada)	CM / AM	March 29, 2001 (aged 20)	(Canada) Montreal Impact Academy
30	Umar Muslim	(Canada)	LW / RW	June 7, 2003 (aged 18)	(Canada) FC Edmonton
36	Felix N'sa	(Canada)	DM / CB	September 25, 2003 (aged 18)	(Canada) Panellinios Montreal FC
44	Isaiah Johnston	(Canada)	CM	August 14, 2001 (aged 20)	(Canada) CBU Capers
70	Jordan Faria	(Canada)	CM	June 13, 2000 (aged 21)	(Canada) Toronto FC II
99	William Wallace (out on loan)	(Brazil)	LW / RW / CM	July 4, 2002 (aged 19)	(Brazil) Fluminense
Forwards
7	Álvaro Rivero	(Spain)	ST	April 17, 1997 (aged 24)	(Spain) Leganés B
9	Lisandro Cabrera (out on loan)	(Argentina)	ST	January 4, 1998 (aged 23)	(Argentina) Newell's Old Boys
11	Nicholas Hamilton	(Jamaica)	ST / RW / LW	March 16, 1996 (aged 25)	(Jamaica) Cavalier
13	Osvaldo Ramirez	(United States)	ST	May 13, 1997 (aged 24)	(Mexico) Cancún F.C.
17	Julian Ulbricht	(Germany)	ST	June 16, 1999 (aged 22)	(Germany) Hamburger SV II
80	Lowell Wright	(Canada)	CF	August 19, 2003 (aged 18)	(Canada) Woodbridge Strikers

== Transfers ==
=== In ===
No.	Pos.	Player	From club	Fee/notes	Date	Source
17	FW	(Germany) Julian Ulbricht	(Germany) Hamburger SV II	Free	October 5, 2020	
10	MF	(Argentina) Mateo Hernández	(Argentina) Colón	Free	October 20, 2020	
42	DF	(Canada) Ryan Lindsay	(Croatia) Dinamo Zagreb	Free	October 21, 2020	
4	MF	(Canada) Jordan Wilson	(Denmark) Nykøbing FC	Free	October 22, 2020	
36	MF	(Canada) Felix N'sa	(Canada) Panellinios Montreal FC	Free	November 4, 2020	
66	DF	(Canada) Chrisnovic N'sa	(Canada) HFX Wanderers	Free	November 5, 2020	
1	GK	(Canada) Niko Giantsopoulos	(Canada) Cavalry FC	Free	November 10, 2020	
28	MF	(Canada) Cédric Toussaint	(Canada) Montreal Impact Academy	Free	November 11, 2020	
99	MF	(Brazil) William Wallace	(Brazil) Fluminense	Undisclosed	November 12, 2020	
9	FW	(Argentina) Lisandro Cabrera	(Argentina) Newell's Old Boys	Free	November 18, 2020	
8	MF	(Colombia) Sebastian Gutierrez	(Colombia) Llaneros	Free	December 15, 2020	
5	DF	(Canada) Dominick Zator	(Canada) Cavalry FC	Free	February 1, 2021	
19	MF	(Canada) Noah Verhoeven	(Canada) Pacific FC	Free	February 4, 2021	
70	MF	(Canada) Jordan Faria	(Canada) Toronto FC II	Free	June 3, 2021	
23	MF	(Dominican Republic) Gerard Lavergne	(United States) FC Tucson	Free	June 3, 2021	
13	FW	(United States) Osvaldo Ramírez	(Mexico) Cancún F.C.	Free	June 3, 2021	
18	GK	(Canada) Eleias Himaras	(Canada) Toronto FC Academy	Free	August 7, 2021	
30	MF	(Canada) Muslim Umar	(Canada) FC Edmonton	Free	September 22, 2021	
	GK	(Canada) Andrew Romano		Free	September 22, 2021	
12	MF	(Guyana) Javier George	(France) Stade Beaucairois	Free	October 7, 2022	

==== Loans in ====
No.	Pos.	Player	Loaned from	Fee/notes	Date	Source
57	DF	(Canada) Terique Mohammed	(Republic of Ireland) Dundalk F.C.	Season-long loan	June 3, 2021	
3	DF	(Canada) Matteo Campagna	(Canada) Vancouver Whitecaps FC	Season-long loan	August 24, 2021	

==== Draft picks ====
York United selected the following players in the 2021 CPL–U Sports Draft on January 29, 2021. Draft picks are not automatically signed to the team roster. Only those who are signed to a contract will be listed as transfers in.

Round	Selection	Pos.	Player	Nationality	University
1	4	FW	Christopher Campoli	Canada	Ontario Tech Ridgebacks
2	13	DF	Danial Rafisamii	Canada	Ontario Tech Ridgebacks

=== Out ===
==== Transferred out ====
No.	Pos.	Player	To club	Fee/notes	Date	Source
22	MF	(Canada) Julian Altobelli	(Canada) Toronto FC II	Contract expired	October 28, 2020	
37	GK	(Canada) Ezequiel Carrasco		Option not picked up	October 28, 2020	
8	MF	(Canada) Joseph Di Chiara	(Canada) Cavalry FC	Contract expired	October 28, 2020	
	MF	(Argentina) Brian López		Option not picked up	October 28, 2020	
99	FW	(Brazil) Gabriel Vasconcelos	(Brazil) Sampaio Corrêa	Option not picked up	October 28, 2020	
26	DF	(Japan) Fugo Segawa	(Canada) TSS Rovers	Option not picked up	October 28, 2020	
17	DF	(Canada) Matthew Arnone		Contract expired	October 28, 2020	
5	MF	(Canada) Chris Mannella	(Canada) Atlético Ottawa	Contract expired	October 28, 2020	
23	MF	(Japan) Wataru Murofushi	(South Korea) Bucheon FC	Contract expired	October 28, 2020	
18	MF	(Trinidad and Tobago) Ryan Telfer	(Canada) Atlético Ottawa	Contract expired	October 28, 2020	
12	FW	(Canada) Jace Kotsopoulos	(Canada) Guelph United FC	Contract expired	October 28, 2020	
13	DF	(Canada) Luca Gasparotto		Retired	November 3, 2020	
10	MF	(Canada) Manny Aparicio	(Canada) Pacific FC	Contract expired	November 6, 2020	
3	DF	(Canada) Morey Doner	(Canada) HFX Wanderers	Contract terminated by mutual consent	November 14, 2020	
19	MF	(Canada) Kyle Porter	(Canada) FC Edmonton	Contract expired	December 23, 2020	
57	DF	(Canada) Terique Mohammed	(Republic of Ireland) Dundalk F.C.	Loan terminated	September 22, 2021	

==== Loans out ====
No.	Pos.	Player	Loaned to	Fee/notes	Date	Source
11	FW	(Jamaica) Nicholas Hamilton	(Scotland) Dundee F.C.	Loaned until June 2021	September 28, 2020	
21	MF	(Canada) Michael Petrasso	(England) Barnet F.C.	Loaned until June 2021	October 5, 2020	
5	DF	(Canada) Dominick Zator	(Sweden) Vasalunds IF	Loaned until June 2021	February 2, 2021	
9	FW	(Argentina) Lisandro Cabrera	(Dominican Republic) Atlético Pantoja	Loaned until December 2021; terminated in June 2021	March 18, 2021	
10	MF	(Argentina) Mateo Hernández	(Dominican Republic) Atlético Pantoja	Loaned until December 2021; terminated in June 2021	May 12, 2021	
9	FW	(Argentina) Lisandro Cabrera	(Costa Rica) Guadalupe F.C.	Loaned until December 2021	June 2, 2021	
10	MF	(Argentina) Mateo Hernández	(Costa Rica) Guadalupe F.C.	Loaned until December 2021	June 2, 2021	
99	MF	(Brazil) William Wallace	(Brazil) Floresta Esporte Clube	Loaned until March 2022	August 30, 2021	

== Competitions ==
=== Canadian Premier League ===
==== Table ====
Pos	Team	Pld	W	D	L	GF	GA	GD	Pts	Qualification
1	Forge (S)	28	16	2	10	39	24	+15	50	Advance to playoffs
2	Cavalry	28	14	8	6	34	30	+4	50	Advance to playoffs
3	Pacific (C)	28	13	6	9	47	34	+13	45	Advance to playoffs
4	York United	28	8	12	8	35	39	−4	36	Advance to playoffs
5	Valour	28	10	5	13	38	36	+2	35	
6	HFX Wanderers	28	8	11	9	28	34	−6	35	
7	FC Edmonton	28	6	10	12	34	41	−7	28	
8	Atlético Ottawa	28	6	8	14	30	47	−17	26	

Updated to match(es) played on unknown. Source: CanPL.ca
Rules for classification: 1) points; 2) total wins.
(C) Champions; (S) Regular season winner

==== Results by match ====
Match	1	2	3	4	5	6	7	8	9	10	11	12	13	14	15	16	17	18	19	20	21	22	23	24	25	26	27	28
Result	L	D	D	W	L	D	L	W	L	W	W	D	D	L	D	D	W	W	D	W	D	D	L	D	D	W	L	L
Position	5	6	7	5	6	5	7	5	7	5	5	5	5	5	5	5	5	4	4	4	4	4	5	5	5	4	4	4

Updated to match(es) played on November 9, 2021. Source: #Matches
W = Win; D = Draw; L = Loss

==== Matches ====
June 27 1	Cavalry FC	2–1	York United FC	Winnipeg, Manitoba
5:00pm EST	Camargo 32'; Escalante 51'; Di Chiara (yellow card) 86'; Norman Jr. (yellow card) 90+1'	Report	Petrasso (yellow card) 50'; Abzi 79'	Stadium: IG Field; Referee: Juan Marquez

July 1 2	York United FC	2–2	Pacific FC	Winnipeg, Manitoba
5:00pm EST	Abzi (yellow card) 2', (goal) 32'; Mohammed (yellow card) 26'; Petrasso (yellow card) 43'; Johnston (yellow card) 74'; Wilson 82'; C. N'sa (yellow card) 88'	Report	Campbell (yellow card) 36'; Aparicio (yellow card) 45'; Heard 51'; C. N'sa 67' (o.g.); Bustos (yellow card) 86'	Stadium: IG Field; Referee: Alain Ruch

July 4 3	FC Edmonton	1–1	York United FC	Winnipeg, Manitoba
10:00pm EST	Aird 52'	Report	Thompson (yellow card) 42'; Petrasso 67'; Zator (yellow card) 78'; Mohammed (yellow card) 88'; Ramírez (yellow card) 89'; Halley (yellow card) 90'; Giantsopoulos (yellow card) 90'	Stadium: IG Field; Referee: Fabrizio Stasolla

July 7 4	York United FC	2–1	Valour FC	Winnipeg, Manitoba
10:00 EST	Wright 14'; Zator 48'; Mohammed (yellow card) 75'; Ramírez (yellow card) 90+3'	Report	Jean-Baptiste 5'; Alemán (yellow card) 42'; Ricci (yellow card) 84'; Cebara (yellow card) 90+7'	Stadium: IG Field; Referee: Yusri Rudolf

July 10 5	Pacific FC	3–0	York United FC	Winnipeg, Manitoba
5:00pm EST	Polisi 6'; Bustos 9' 53'; Dixon (yellow card) 60'; Haynes (yellow card) 74'	Report	Abzi (yellow card) 28'; Johnston (yellow card) 58'	Stadium: IG Field; Referee: Juan Marquez

July 14 6	York United FC	0–0	Cavalry FC	Winnipeg, Manitoba
7:00pm EST	Johnston (yellow card) 40'	Report	Norman Jr. (yellow card) 40'; Novak (yellow card) 53'; Ledgerwood (yellow card) 57'; Loturi (yellow card) 76'	Stadium: IG Field; Referee: Filip Dujic

July 18 7	Valour FC	3–0	York United FC	Winnipeg, Manitoba
2:30pm EST	Cebara 18'; Ricci 42' 73'; Ohin (yellow card) 54'; Dyer (yellow card) 57'; Reyes (yellow card) 62'	Report	Giantsopoulos (yellow card) 19'; Wilson (yellow card) 26'; Ferrari (yellow card) 71'	Stadium: IG Field; Referee: David Barrie

July 24 8	York United FC	1–0	FC Edmonton	Winnipeg, Manitoba
5:00pm EST	Johnston 12'; Abzi (yellow card) 61'; Toussaint (yellow card) 63'	Report	Didic (yellow card) 26'; Mabussi (yellow card) 42'	Stadium: IG Field; Referee: Juan Marquez

July 30 9	York United FC	0–1	Forge FC	Toronto, Ontario
5:00pm EST	Toussaint (yellow card) 19'; Zator (red card) 41'; Vorhoeven (yellow card) 57'; Abzi (yellow card) 83'	Report	Babouli 4'; Grant (yellow card) 6'; Borges (yellow card) 79'; Henry (yellow card) 83'	Stadium: York Lions Stadium; Attendance: 1,710; Referee: Yusri Rudolf

August 4 10	Forge FC	0–1	York United FC	Hamilton, Ontario
7:00pm EST	Navarro (yellow card) 25'; Babouli (yellow card) 90+3'	Report	C. N'sa (yellow card) 5'; Rivero 54' (yellow card) 25' (yellow-red card) 64'; Ferrari (yellow card) 76'; Giantsopoulos (yellow card) 81'	Stadium: Tim Hortons Field; Attendance: 3,712; Referee: Fabrizio Stasolla

August 7 11	HFX Wanderers	2–3	York United FC	Halifax, Nova Scotia
2:00pm EST	Ruby 21' (yellow card) 78'; Morelli 40'; Restrepo (yellow card) 43'	Report	Ferrari 39'; Johnston 54' (yellow card) 80'; Wilson (yellow card) 67'; Wright 90'	Stadium: Wanderers Grounds; Attendance: 3,800; Referee: David Barrie

August 18 12	Atlético Ottawa	1–1	York United FC	Ottawa, Ontario
7:00pm EST	McKendry (yellow card) 56'; Telfer (yellow card) 73'; Soto 89' (yellow card) 90'	Report	Toussaint (yellow card) 58'; Rivero 65' (pen.)	Stadium: TD Place Stadium; Attendance: 2,788; Referee: Fabrizio Stasolla

August 25 13	York United FC	1–1	HFX Wanderers	Toronto, Ontario
6:00pm EST	Ramírez 3'; Wilson (yellow card) 67'; Ferrari (yellow card) 90+5'; Johnston (yellow card) 90+6'	Report	Salter 79'; Polisi (yellow card) 82'; Gagnon-Laparé (yellow card) 85'; Santos (red card) 90+2'	Stadium: York Lions Stadium; Referee: Filip Dujic

August 28 14	Forge FC	3–1	York United FC	Hamilton, Ontario
4:00pm EST	Cissé (yellow card) 11'; Borges 14', (yellow card) 60'; Pacius 45'; Choinière 74'; Henry (yellow card) 90+2'	Report	Abzi 39'; Johnston (yellow card) 84'	Stadium: Tim Hortons Field; Attendance: 3,819; Referee: Pierre-Luc Lauzière

September 1 15	Atlético Ottawa	2–2	York United FC	Ottawa, Ontario
7:00pm EST	T. Shaw (yellow card) 46'; Acosta 50'; Mannella (yellow card) 74'; M. Shaw 82'; McKendry (yellow card) 64'	Report	Petrasso 18'; Rivero 60'; Ulbricht (yellow card) 64'	Stadium: TD Place Stadium; Referee: David Barrie

September 6 16	HFX Wanderers	3–3	York United FC	Halifax, Nova Scotia
2:00pm EST	Bent (yellow card) 39'; Polisi (yellow card) 70'; Morelli 84' (pen.) 87' (pen.); Schaale (yellow card) 90+1'; Abzi 90+2' (o.g.); Camara (yellow card) 90+3'	Report	Abzi 40'; Ulbricht 52'; Rivero 90' (yellow card) 90+1'	Stadium: Wanderers Grounds; Attendance: 3,446; Referee: Yusri Rudolf

September 11 17	Forge FC	0–2	York United FC	Hamilton, Ontario
4:00pm EST	Grant (yellow card) 39'	Report	Johnston (yellow card) 38'; Ferrari 60'; Rivero 62'; Toussaint (yellow card) 78'; Abzi (yellow card) 83'	Stadium: Tim Hortons Field; Attendance: 3,449; Referee: Carly Shaw-MacLaren

September 14 18	York United FC	2–0	Atlético Ottawa	Ottawa, Ontario
7:00pm EST	N'sa (yellow card) 46'; Abzi 53'; Wilson (yellow card) 58'; Gutiérrez 68'	Report	Acosta (yellow card) 40'; Higgins (yellow card) 69' (yellow-red card) 90+5'	Stadium: TD Place Stadium; Attendance: 1,021; Referee: Fabrizio Stasolla

September 18 19	York United FC	0–0	HFX Wanderers	Toronto, Ontario
2:00pm EST	C. N'sa (yellow card) 84'	Report	Riggi (yellow card) 24'	Stadium: York Lions Stadium; Referee: Carly Shaw-Maclaren

September 26 20	York United FC	2–1	Valour FC	Toronto, Ontario
2:00pm EST	Wilson (yellow card) 35'; Verhoeven (yellow card) 50'; Wright 55' 61'	Report	Fordyce (yellow card) 10'; Levis 27' (yellow card) 37'	Stadium: York Lions Stadium; Attendance: 1,122; Referee: Scott Bowman

October 3 21	York United FC	2–2	HFX Wanderers	Toronto, Ontario
1:00pm EST	Rivero 13'; Wilson (yellow card) 23'; Abzi (yellow card) 43'; C. N'sa (yellow card) 60'; Ulbricht (yellow card) 68' (goal) 78'	Report	Garcia 27'; Camara 41'; Portal (yellow card) 82'	Stadium: York Lions Stadium; Referee: Carly Shaw-MacLaren

October 8 22	York United FC	1–1	Atlético Ottawa	Toronto, Ontario
7:30pm EST	Toussaint (yellow card) 25'; Gutiérrez (yellow card) 62'; Wright (yellow card) 86'; Wilson 90+2'; Abzi (yellow card) 90+2'	Report	McKendry (yellow card) 24'; Shaw 49' (pen.); Verhoven (yellow card) 51'; Neufville (yellow card) 90+2'; Núñez (yellow card) 90+6'; Soto (yellow card) 90+7'; Powley (yellow card) 90+9'	Stadium: York Lions Stadium; Attendance: 970; Referee: Renzo Villanueva

October 14 23	Cavalry FC	2–1	York United FC	Calgary, Alberta
9:00pm EST	Camargo 20'; Di Chiara (yellow card) 40' (yellow-red card) 40+3'; Escalante (yellow card) 45+3'; C. N'sa 80' (o.g.)	Report	Johnston 5' (yellow card) 45+3'; Wilson (yellow card) 72'; C. N'sa (yellow card) 77'	Stadium: ATCO Field; Attendance: 1,925; Referee: David Barrie

October 17 24	York United FC	1–1	FC Edmonton	Toronto, Ontario
2:00pm EST	Wilson (yellow card) 28'; Faria 53'; Abzi (yellow card) 90+1'	Report	Fayia (yellow card) 34'; Ongaro 47'; Najem (yellow card) 90+2'	Stadium: York Lions Stadium; Referee: Carly Shaw-MacLaren

October 24 25	Atlético Ottawa	1–1	York United FC	Ottawa, Ontario
2:00pm EST	Coupland 15'; Kapor (yellow card) 64'; Telfer (yellow card) 82'	Report	Petrasso (yellow card) 9'; Toussaint (yellow card) 71'; C. N'sa 80'	Stadium: TD Place Stadium; Referee: Filip Dujic

October 30 26	Pacific FC	1–2	York United FC	Langford, British Columbia
6:00pm EST	Dada-Luke (yellow card) 43'; Campbell 49'; Heard (yellow card) 51'; Aparicio (yellow card) 69'; MacNaughton (yellow card) 71'; dos Santos (red card) 83'	Report	Ferrari (yellow card) 20'; Campagna (yellow card) 35'; Ulbricht 56'; Johnston (yellow card) 63'; Wright 81'; Toussaint (yellow card) 89'	Stadium: Starlight Stadium; Referee: Alain Ruch

November 6 27	York United FC	1–2	Forge FC	Toronto, Ontario
1:00pm EST	Toussaint (yellow card) 17'; Abzi 29'; Johnston (yellow card) 90+6'	Report	Bekker (yellow card) 23'; Henry (yellow card) 30'; Cissé (yellow card) 40'; Pacius 51'; Sabak (yellow card) 69'; Choinière 81'; Welshman (yellow card) 90+5'; Borges (yellow card) 90+6'	Stadium: York Lions Stadium; Attendance: 1,126; Referee: Filip Dujic

November 9 28	York United FC	1–3	Forge FC	Toronto, Ontario
7:00pm EST	Wright 51'	Report	Borges 23'; Krutzen (yellow card) 36', (goal) 41'; Achinioti-Jönsson 73'	Stadium: York Lions Stadium; Attendance: 756; Referee: Yusri Rudolf

==== Playoff matches ====
November 21 Semi-final	Forge FC	3–1	York United FC	Hamilton, Ontario
3:00pm	Pacius 9'; Navarro (yellow card) 60' (goal) 66'; Borges (yellow card) 62'; Verhoeven 73' (o.g.)	Report	Petrasso 38'; Verhoeven (yellow card) 61'; N'sa (yellow card) 62'; Zator (yellow card) 75'; Johnston (yellow card) 85'; Abzi (yellow card) 88'; Ferrari (yellow card) 90+1'	Stadium: Tim Hortons Field; Attendance: 5,123; Referee: Juan Marquez

=== Canadian Championship ===
August 21 Preliminary round	York United FC	5–0	Master's Futbol Academy	Toronto, Ontario
3:00 PM ET	Ferrari 38'; Ramírez (yellow card) 11' (goal) 45+2'; Wilson 59'; Rivero (yellow card) 76'; Ulbricht 85' (pen.), 90+1'	Report	Avila (yellow card) 32'; Wright (yellow card) 34'; Phillip (yellow card) 73'	Stadium: York Lions Stadium; Attendance: 1,102; Referee: Scott Bowman

September 22 Quarter-finals	Toronto FC	4–0	York United FC	Toronto, Ontario
7:30PM ET	Delgado (yellow card) 30'; Osorio 41'; Achara 41'; Soteldo 84' (pen.); Okello 89'	Report	Petrasso (yellow card) 55'	Stadium: BMO Field; Attendance: 3,651; Referee: Juan Marquez

== Statistics ==
=== Squad and statistics ===
As of November 21, 2021

No.	Pos	Nat	Player	Total		Canadian Premier League		Canadian Championship	
No.	Pos	Nat	Player	Apps	Goals	Apps	Goals	Apps	Goals
Goalkeepers
1	GK	(Canada) CAN	Niko Giantsopoulos	9	0	7+2	0	0+0	0
18	GK	(Canada) CAN	Eleias Himaras	0	0	0+0	0	0+0	0
29	GK	(Canada) CAN	Nathan Ingham	24	0	22+0	0	2+0	0
Defenders
3	DF	(Canada) CAN	Matteo Campagna	5	0	3+2	0	0+0	0
5	DF	(Canada) CAN	Dominick Zator	27	1	24+1	1	2+0	0
6	DF	(Canada) CAN	Roger Thompson	10	0	7+2	0	1+0	0
20	DF	(Canada) CAN	Diyaeddine Abzi	28	6	26+0	6	2+0	0
36	DF	(Canada) CAN	Felix N'sa	0	0	0+0	0	0+0	0
42	DF	(Canada) CAN	Ryan Lindsay	0	0	0+0	0	0+0	0
57	DF	(Canada) CAN	Terique Mohammed	9	0	9+0	0	0+0	0
66	DF	(Canada) CAN	Chrisnovic N'sa	29	1	26+1	1	2+0	0
Midfielders
4	MF	(Canada) CAN	Jordan Wilson	28	3	24+2	2	1+1	1
8	MF	(Colombia) COL	Sebastian Gutierrez	15	1	5+8	1	1+1	0
12	MF	(Guyana) GUY	Javier George	1	0	1+0	0	0+0	0
14	MF	(Canada) CAN	Ijah Halley	16	0	3+12	0	0+1	0
16	MF	(Canada) CAN	Max Ferrari	30	3	27+1	2	2+0	1
19	MF	(Canada) CAN	Noah Verhoeven	29	0	25+2	0	2+0	0
21	MF	(Canada) CAN	Michael Petrasso	24	3	19+3	3	2+0	0
23	MF	(Dominican Republic) DOM	Gerard Lavergne	6	0	0+6	0	0+0	0
28	MF	(Canada) CAN	Cédric Toussaint	26	0	16+8	0	0+2	0
30	MF	(Canada) CAN	Muslim Umar	1	0	0+1	0	0+0	0
44	MF	(Canada) CAN	Isaiah Johnston	28	3	23+3	3	2+0	0
70	MF	(Canada) CAN	Jordan Faria	13	1	3+9	1	0+1	0
Forwards
7	FW	(Spain) ESP	Álvaro Rivero	27	6	15+10	6	1+1	0
11	FW	(Jamaica) JAM	Nicholas Hamilton	16	0	3+12	0	0+1	0
13	FW	(United States) USA	Osvaldo Ramírez	19	2	4+14	1	1+0	1
17	FW	(Germany) GER	Julian Ulbricht	20	5	14+5	3	0+1	2
80	FW	(Canada) CAN	Lowell Wright	29	6	13+14	6	1+1	0

=== Top scorers ===
Rank	Nat.	Player	Pos.	Canadian Premier League	Canadian Championship	TOTAL
1	(Canada)	Diyaeddine Abzi	DF	6	0	6
1	(Spain)	Álvaro Rivero	MF	6	0	6
1	(Canada)	Lowell Wright	FW	6	0	6
2	(Germany)	Julian Ulbricht	FW	3	2	5
3	(Canada)	Max Ferrari	MF	2	1	3
3	(Canada)	Isaiah Johnston	MF	3	0	3
3	(Canada)	Michael Petrasso	MF	3	0	3
3	(Canada)	Jordan Wilson	MF	2	1	3
4	(United States)	Osvaldo Ramírez	FW	1	1	2
5	(Canada)	Jordan Faria	MF	1	0	1
5	(Colombia)	Sebastian Gutierrez	MF	1	0	1
5	(Canada)	Chrisnovic N'sa	DF	1	0	1
5	(Canada)	Dominick Zator	DF	1	0	1
Totals				36	5	41

Updated to match played Nov 21, 2021
Source: Canadian Premier League

=== Top assists ===
Rank	Nat.	Player	Pos.	Canadian Premier League	Canadian Championship	TOTAL
1	(Canada)	Michael Petrasso	MF	5	2	7
2	(Canada)	Max Ferrari	MF	4	0	4
3	(Canada)	Diyaeddine Abzi	DF	3	0	3
3	(Germany)	Julian Ulbricht	FW	3	0	3
3	(Canada)	Noah Verhoeven	MF	3	0	3
3	(Canada)	Lowell Wright	FW	3	0	3
4	(Spain)	Álvaro Rivero	MF	2	0	2
4	(Canada)	Isaiah Johnston	MF	1	1	2
5	(Canada)	Ijah Halley	MF	1	0	1
5	(Canada)	Terique Mohammed	DF	1	0	1
5	(United States)	Osvaldo Ramírez	FW	1	0	1
Totals				27	3	30

Updated to match played Nov 21, 2021
Source: Canadian Premier League

=== Clean sheets ===
Rank	Nat.	Player	Canadian Premier League	Canadian Championship	TOTAL
1	(Canada)	Nathan Ingham	5	1	6
Totals			5	1	6

Updated to match played Nov 21, 2021
Source: Canadian Premier League

=== Disciplinary record ===
No.	Pos.	Nat.	Player	Canadian Premier League		Canadian Championship		TOTAL	
No.	Pos.	Nat.	Player	Yellow card	Red card	Yellow card	Red card	Yellow card	Red card
1	GK	(Canada)	Niko Giantsopoulos	2	0	0	0	2	0
3	DF	(Canada)	Matteo Campagna	1	0	0	0	1	0
4	MF	(Canada)	Jordan Wilson	8	0	0	0	8	0
5	DF	(Canada)	Dominick Zator	2	1	0	0	2	1
6	DF	(Canada)	Roger Thompson	1	0	0	0	1	0
7	FW	(Spain)	Álvaro Rivero	1	1	1	0	2	1
8	MF	(Colombia)	Sebastian Gutierrez	1	0	0	0	1	0
13	FW	(United States)	Osvaldo Ramírez	2	0	1	0	3	0
14	MF	(Canada)	Ijah Halley	1	0	0	0	1	0
16	MF	(Canada)	Max Ferrari	5	0	0	0	5	0
17	FW	(Germany)	Julian Ulbricht	2	0	0	0	2	0
19	MF	(Canada)	Noah Verhoeven	3	0	0	0	3	0
20	DF	(Canada)	Diyaeddine Abzi	9	0	0	0	9	0
21	MF	(Canada)	Michael Petrasso	3	0	1	0	4	0
28	MF	(Canada)	Cédric Toussaint	8	0	0	0	8	0
44	MF	(Canada)	Isaiah Johnston	11	0	0	0	11	0
57	DF	(Canada)	Terique Mohammed	3	0	0	0	3	0
66	DF	(Canada)	Chrisnovic N'sa	7	0	0	0	7	0
80	FW	(Canada)	Lowell Wright	1	0	0	0	1	0
Totals				71	2	3	0	74	2

Updated to match played Nov 21, 2021
Source: Canadian Premier League
