= Javier George =

Guyanese footballer (born 2001)

Personal information
- Full name: Javier Al George
- Date of birth: 27 January 2001 (age 25)
- Place of birth: New Amsterdam, Guyana
- Height: 1.78 m (5 ft 10 in)
- Position: Midfielder

Youth career
- 2009–2017: Toronto Skillz
- 2017–2019: Toronto FC
- 2019–2020: Stade Beaucairois

Senior career*
Years	Team	Apps	(Gls)
2016–2017	Toronto Skillz	5	(0)
2018	Toronto FC III	3	(0)
2020–2021	Stade Beaucairois	1	(0)
2021	York United	1	(0)
2022	York United	0	(0)
2023–2024	Simcoe County Rovers	39	(0)
2025	Scrosoppi FC	10	(0)
2025	→ Scrosoppi FC B	1	(0)

International career^{‡}
2020	Guyana U20	2	(0)
2021–2022	Guyana	4	(0)
- * Club domestic league appearances and goals as of August 23, 2025 ‡ National team caps and goals as of September 2, 2022

Javier Al George (born 27 January 2001) is a Guyanese footballer who plays as a midfielder who played for the Guyana national team.

== Early life ==
Born in Guyana, George moved to Canada at the age of 6. At the age of 8, he started playing organized football with Toronto Skillz FC.

== Club career ==
He made his debut for the Toronto Skillz FC first team in League1 Ontario on August 28, 2016, against the Woodbridge Strikers.

In 2017, he joined the Toronto FC Academy, playing for their youth teams, including three matches in League1 Ontario in 2018.

In 2019, he joined the French club Stade Beaucairois. He made his debut on March 8, 2020, against Toulouse Rodéo FC.

On October 7, 2021 Canadian Premier League club York United announced they had signed George to a contract through the end of the 2021 season. He made his debut for York on November 9 against Forge FC. In June 2022, he briefly rejoined York on a short-term contract as an emergency relief player during a York injury crisis.

In March 2023, he joined League1 Ontario side Simcoe County Rovers FC.

== International career ==
He first represented the Guyana U20 team at the 2020 CONCACAF U-20 Championship qualifying tournament. After initially being denied entry into Nicaragua, the host country, after failing to satisfy the 10-day quarantine period for the Yellow Fever vaccine, he entered the country and made his debut in the team's third game against the US Virgin Islands U20 team.

He made his debut for Guyana national team in a 2022 FIFA World Cup qualification match against Puerto Rico on 8 June 2021.

== Career statistics ==
=== Club ===
As of August 23, 2025

Club	Season	League			Playoffs		Domestic Cup		League Cup		Total	
Club	Season	Division	Apps	Goals	Apps	Goals	Apps	Goals	Apps	Goals	Apps	Goals
Toronto Skillz FC	2016	League1 Ontario	2	0	–		–		0	0	2	0
Toronto Skillz FC	2017	League1 Ontario	3	0	–		–		0	0	3	0
Toronto Skillz FC	Total		5	0	0	0	0	0	0	0	5	0
Toronto FC III	2018	League1 Ontario	3	0	–		–		0	0	3	0
Stade Beaucairois	2019–20	Championnat National 3	1	0	–		0	0	–		1	0
Stade Beaucairois	2020–21	Championnat National 3	0	0	–		0	0	–		0	0
Stade Beaucairois	Total		1	0	0	0	0	0	0	0	1	0
York United FC	2021	Canadian Premier League	1	0	0	0	0	0	–		1	0
York United FC	2022	Canadian Premier League	0	0	–		0	0	–		0	0
York United FC	Total		1	0	0	0	0	0	0	0	1	0
Simcoe County Rovers FC	2023	League1 Ontario	19	0	2	0	–		–		21	0
Simcoe County Rovers FC	2024	League1 Ontario Premier	20	0	–		1	0	4	0	25	0
Simcoe County Rovers FC	Total		39	0	2	0	1	0	4	0	46	0
Scrosoppi FC	2025	League1 Ontario Premier	10	0	–		1	0	2	0	13	0
Scrosoppi FC B	2025	League2 Ontario	1	0	–		–		–		1	0
Career total			60	0	2	0	1	0	6	0	55	0

=== International ===
As of match played April 16, 2022

Appearances and goals by national team and year
National team	Year	Apps	Goals
Guyana	2021	2	0
Guyana	2022	2	0
Total		4	0
