= Lowell Wright =

Canadian soccer player (born 2003)

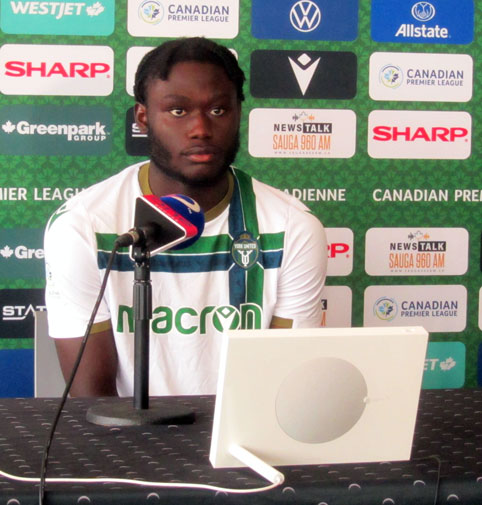
- Wright in 2021

Personal information
- Date of birth: August 19, 2003 (age 23)
- Place of birth: Brampton, Ontario, Canada
- Height: 1.83 m (6 ft 0 in)
- Position: Forward

Team information
- Current team: Scrosoppi FC

Youth career
- Brampton YSC
- 2015–2018: Toronto FC
- 2018: Sigma FC
- 2019: Woodbridge Strikers

Senior career*
Years	Team	Apps	(Gls)
2019	Woodbridge Strikers	3	(1)
2020–2022	York United	39	(7)
2022–2024	Whitecaps FC 2	18	(7)
2023	→ Whitecaps FC Academy (loan)	1	(0)
2024	Cavalry FC	11	(1)
2025	Langley United	1	(0)
2025	TSS FC Rovers	7	(3)
2026–	Scrosoppi FC	1	(1)
2026–	→ Scrosoppi FC B	1	(0)

International career^{‡}
2022	Canada U20	6	(2)
- * Club domestic league appearances and goals as of April 18, 2026 ‡ National team caps and goals as of June 26, 2022

Lowell Wright (born August 19, 2003) is a Canadian soccer player who plays for Scrosoppi FC in the Ontario Premier League.

== Early life ==
Wright was born in Brampton, Ontario to Jamaican parents. At youth level, he played in the Toronto FC Academy, serving as captain of the U-12 team. In 2018, he left the Toronto FC Academy and joined the youth system of Sigma FC. In 2019, he joined the youth system of the Woodbridge Strikers, scoring 42 goals across all competitions for their U-17 side.

== Club career ==
In 2019, Wright joined League1 Ontario side Woodbridge Strikers, scoring one goal in three league appearances and making one appearance in the playoffs.

In July 2020, Wright signed a four-year contract with Canadian Premier League side York9 (later renamed York United), becoming the youngest player to sign for the club (at age sixteen), as well as signing the longest contract in club history. His signing was expediated by the COVID-19 pandemic, as the club was initially planning to sign him to begin in January 2021, however, due to the inability of some foreign players to come to Canada due to travel restrictions, he was signed in July 2020. He made his professional debut for York9 on August 15 against Atlético Ottawa and scored a goal in an eventual 2–2 draw, becoming the youngest goal-scorer in Canadian Premier League history at 16 years, 11 months, and 26 days. He scored his first career brace on September 26, 2021, against Valour FC.

In August 2022, he transferred to Whitecaps FC 2 of MLS Next Pro. On September 24, 2023, he scored the first WFC2 hat trick in MLS Next Pro, against the Tacoma Defiance. Wright was released by the club in May 2024, after having scored 7 goals in 18 games, including three goals in three matches in 2014.

In July 2024, he returned to the Canadian Premier League, signing with Cavalry FC. He made his debut on July 26 against Vancouver FC. In January 2025, Cavalry announced that Wright's contract had been terminated by mutual consent.

In 2025, he began playing with Langley United in League1 British Columbia, before switching to TSS FC Rovers.

== International career ==
Wright was born in Canada to Jamaican parents. In April 2022, Wright was called up to the Canadian Under-20 side for two friendly matches against Costa Rica in San José. In June 2022, he was named to the Canadian U-20 team for the 2022 CONCACAF U-20 Championship. He appeared in all four of the team's games at the tournament, scoring twice.

== Career statistics ==
As of July 25, 2025

Club statistics
Club	Season	League			Playoffs		National Cup		Other		Total	
Club	Season	Division	Apps	Goals	Apps	Goals	Apps	Goals	Apps	Goals	Apps	Goals
Woodbridge Strikers	2019	League1 Ontario	3	1	1	0	—		—		4	1
York United	2020	Canadian Premier League	4	1	—		—		—		4	1
York United	2021	Canadian Premier League	26	6	1	0	2	0	—		29	6
York United	2022	Canadian Premier League	9	0	—		2	0	—		11	0
York United	Total		39	7	1	0	4	0	0	0	44	7
Whitecaps FC 2	2022	MLS Next Pro	1	0	—		—		—		1	0
Whitecaps FC 2	2023	MLS Next Pro	14	4	—		—		—		14	4
Whitecaps FC 2	2024	MLS Next Pro	3	3	—		—		—		3	3
Whitecaps FC 2	Total		18	7	0	0	0	0	0	0	18	7
Whitecaps FC Academy (loan)	2023	League1 BC	1	0	0	0	—		—		1	0
Cavalry FC	2024	Canadian Premier League	11	1	1	0	0	0	0	0	12	1
Langley United	2025	League1 British Columbia	1	0	—		—		—		1	0
TSS FC Rovers	2025	League1 British Columbia	7	3	—		1	0	—		8	3
Career total			80	19	3	0	5	0	0	0	88	19
