= Julian Ulbricht =

German footballer

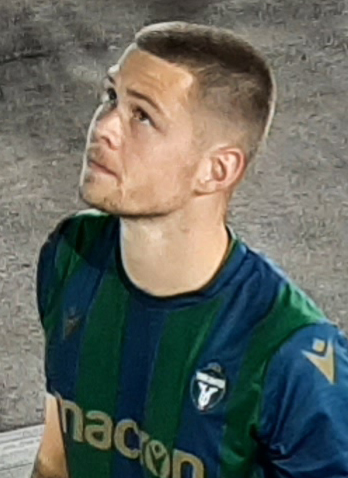
- Ulbricht with York United in 2021

Personal information
- Date of birth: 6 June 1999 (age 27)
- Place of birth: Hamburg, Germany
- Height: 1.82 m (6 ft 0 in)
- Position: Forward

Team information
- Current team: Waldhof Mannheim
- Number: 10

Youth career
- FC St. Pauli
- 2015–2018: Hamburger SV

Senior career*
Years	Team	Apps	(Gls)
2018–2020	Hamburger SV II	21	(6)
2020–2022	York United	18	(3)
2020	→ Phönix Lübeck (loan)	3	(1)
2022	→ FC Edmonton (loan)	8	(1)
2022–2023	Phönix Lübeck	19	(5)
2023–2025	FC St. Pauli II	79	(31)
2025–2026	SV Meppen	33	(27)
2026–	Waldhof Mannheim	0	(0)
- * Club domestic league appearances and goals as of 20 June 2026

Julian Ulbricht (born 6 June 1999) is a German professional footballer who plays as a forward for 3. Liga club Waldhof Mannheim.

== Early life ==
Ulbricht played for the youth academy of FC St. Pauli. In 2015, he joined the youth setup of Hamburger SV.

== Club career ==
In 2018, Ulbricht began playing at the senior level for Hamburger SV II in the fourth tier Regionalliga Nord. In January 2019, he went on trial with Schalke U23. In 2020, Canadian Premier League club Pacific FC had been interested in signing Ulbricht, however, due to the COVID-19 pandemic, the move was not able to be completed. After the 2019–20 season, he departed Hamburger SV. Following his release, he trained with fifth tier side Heeslinger SC.

On 7 October 2020, Ulbricht signed a contract for the 2021 season with an option for 2022 with Canadian Premier League side York United for the 2021 season. He was immediately sent on loan to German Regionalliga Nord side Phönix Lübeck on a short-term deal through the end of 2020. He scored on his debut for Phönix Lübeck against FC St. Pauli II. Before joining York United in March 2021, he was forced quarantine in Turkey and then in Canada, due to travel restrictions emanating from the COVID-19 pandemic.

On 10 July 2021, Ulbricht made his debut as a substitute for York in a 3–0 loss to Pacific FC. On 21 August he scored his first goals for York, netting a brace in a Canadian Championship match against Master's FA. At the end of the season, York announced they had declined the option on Ulbricht's deal. However, on 10 February 2022, Ulbricht signed a new one-year deal with an optional extension with York, and was immediately loaned to FC Edmonton. He scored his first goal for Edmonton on April 30 against HFX Wanderers FC on a penalty kick.

On 11 July 2022, he returned to former club Phönix Lübeck.

On 31 January 2023, he signed with FC St. Pauli II. He was named team captain and in February 2024, he signed an extension with the team.

== Career statistics ==
As of 29 June 2026

Appearances and goals by club, season and competition
Club	Season	League			National cup		Continental		Other		Total	
Club	Season	Division	Apps	Goals	Apps	Goals	Apps	Goals	Apps	Goals	Apps	Goals
Hamburger SV II	2017–18	Regionalliga Nord	1	0	—		—		0	0	1	0
Hamburger SV II	2018–19	Regionalliga Nord	5	1	—		—		0	0	5	1
Hamburger SV II	2019–20	Regionalliga Nord	15	5	—		—		0	0	15	5
Hamburger SV II	Total		21	6	0	0	0	0	0	0	21	6
Phönix Lübeck (loan)	2020–21	Regionalliga Nord	3	1	0	0	—		1 (Note: Appearance in Schleswig-Holstein Cup)	0	4	1
York United	2021	Canadian Premier League	18	3	1	2	—		1 (Note: Appearance in Canadian Premier League play-offs)	0	20	5
FC Edmonton (loan)	2022	Canadian Premier League	9	1	1	0	—		—		10	1
Phönix Lübeck	2022–23	Regionalliga Nord	19	5	0	0	—		—		19	5
FC St. Pauli II	2022–23	Regionalliga Nord	15	9	—		—		—		15	9
FC St. Pauli II	2023–24	Regionalliga Nord	34	12	—		—		—		34	12
FC St. Pauli II	2024–25	Regionalliga Nord	30	10	—		—		—		30	10
Total		79	31	0	0	0	0	0	0	79	31	
SV Meppen	2025–26	Regionalliga Nord	33	27	0	0	—		—		33	27
Career total			182	74	2	2	0	0	2	0	186	76
