= Ryan Lindsay (soccer) =

Canadian soccer player

Personal information
- Full name: Ryan David Lindsay
- Date of birth: December 4, 2001 (age 24)
- Place of birth: Ottawa, Ontario, Canada
- Height: 1.91 m (6 ft 3 in)
- Position: Defender

Youth career
- West Ottawa SC
- 2013–2017: Ottawa South United
- 2017–2018: SG Sacavenense
- 2019–2020: Toronto FC
- 2020: Dinamo Zagreb

Senior career*
Years	Team	Apps	(Gls)
2020	Pohronie	0	(0)
2021	York United	0	(0)
2022	Narva Trans	11	(0)
- * Club domestic league appearances and goals as of May 25, 2022

Ryan David Lindsay (born December 4, 2001) is a Canadian former professional soccer player.

== Early life ==
Lindsay began playing youth soccer with West Ottawa SC and Ottawa South United. Afterwards, he moved to Portugal joining SG Sacavenense, although he was only able to train as he was unable to play in official matches as he did not hold a European passport. After spending a year in Portugal, he returned to Canada, joining the Toronto FC Academy in 2019. In 2020, he joined the youth system of Croatian club Dinamo Zagreb.

== Club career ==
In August 2020, Lindsay joined Fortuna liga club Pohronie, and made his debut for the club in a Slovak Cup match on September 8 against Dunajská Lužná.

In October 2020, Canadian Premier League side York United announced they had signed Lindsay to a multi-year deal through 2022, with a club option. In August 2021, York announced that due to an ongoing medical condition, Lindsay was being placed on the season-ending injury list and would not appear for the club during the 2021 season. On October 29, Lindsay announced he was taking a break from the sport due to his continuing medical situation.

In February 2022, he joined Estonian club JK Narva Trans in the Meistriliiga, with Narva spotting him while he was in Finland visiting friends and seeking a team there, where two Finnish clubs were interested in him. During a match on May 25 against FC Flora, Lindsay collapsed mid-game unconscious, and was taken to hospital for examination. Two weeks later, on June 8, he terminated his contract with the club by mutual consent and retiring his career. He recorded one assist in 12 appearances across all competitions.

== Career statistics ==
As of May 25, 2022

Club	Season	League			Playoffs		Cup		Continental		Total	
Club	Season	Division	Apps	Goals	Apps	Goals	Apps	Goals	Apps	Goals	Apps	Goals
FK Pohronie	2020–21	Slovak Super Liga	0	0	–		2	0	–		2	0
York United FC	2021	Canadian Premier League	0	0	–		0	0	–		0	0
JK Narva Trans	2022	Meistriliiga	11	0	–		1	0	–		12	0
Career total			11	0	0	0	3	0	0	0	14	0
