= Ijah =

Ijah is given name. Notable people with the given name include:

- Ijah Anderson (born 1975), English footballer
- Ijah Halley (born 2001), Canadian soccer player
