= Mark Noonan =

American sports executive, born 1965

2nd commissioner of the Canadian Premier League
- In office September 1, 2022 – June 30, 2025
- Preceded by: David Clanachan

Personal details
- Born: Mark David Noonan; 1965 (age 60–61) Westport, Connecticut, U.S.
- Relatives: Mike Noonan (brother)
- Education: Duke University

Mark Noonan (born 1965) is an American sports executive who was commissioner of the Canadian Premier League (CPL) and CEO of Canada Soccer Business. Previously Noonan held marketing executive positions with the United States Soccer Federation and Major League Soccer as well as CEO of Accra Hearts of Oak, a Ghanaian soccer club. Noonan attended Duke University and was a member of the Blue Devils' 1986 national championship winning soccer team.

== Career ==
In the late 1990s, Noonan was the chief marketing officer of the United States Soccer Federation. During that time, the United States hosted the 1999 FIFA Women's World Cup which set various records for attendance. Noonan later worked for Major League Soccer during a period of volatility for the league. Due to financial losses, MLS contracted by two teams in 2002 and reorganized the league into two conferences. In 2005, Noonan founded FocalSport – a sports and entertainment agency.

In 2018, Noonan became CEO of Accra Hearts of Oak S.C. of the Ghana Premier League. The one-time CAF Champions League winning club had struggled on the field in the 2010s and lacked a permanent training facility. During his tenure, Noonan was responsible for the rebranding of the club's crest and securing a kit sponsorship deal with Umbro. In 2019, Noonan left his position after only one year.

=== Canadian Premier League ===
On August 25, 2022, the Canadian Premier League announced that Noonan would be the league's next commissioner, replacing David Clanachan who had resigned in January. Noonan began his term on September 1 as both CPL commissioner and CEO of Canada Soccer Business. He plans to grow the existing men's league and launch a women's league before the 2026 FIFA World Cup which will be co-hosted by Canada.

On November 21, 2022, Noonan announced that FC Edmonton would not be returning to play in 2023 and that the operating rights had been revoked from the team's owner. FC Edmonton became the first CPL team to cease operations which they did after years of struggles on and off the pitch.

The CPL voluntarily recognized the Professional Footballers Association of Canada as the labor union for CPL players on December 20, 2022. PFA Canada had been seeking recognition since their formation in 2020.

Sporting positions
Preceded by David Clanachan	Commissioner of the Canadian Premier League; 2022–present	Succeeded by Vacant
