= Neil McNeil High School =

Neil McNeil Catholic High School
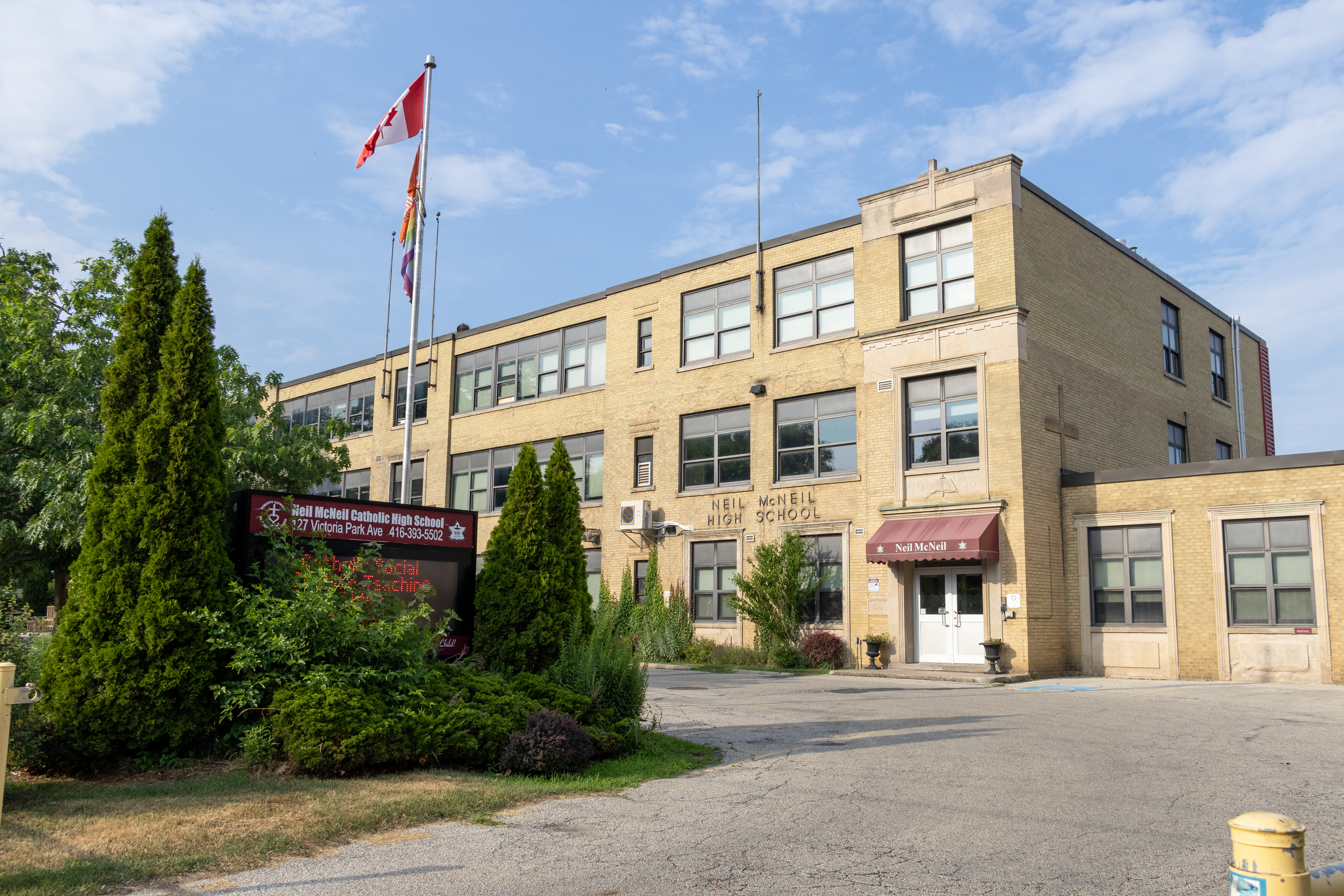
- Neil McNeil in 2025

Location
- 127 Victoria Park Avenue; Toronto, Ontario, M4E 3S2; Canada; 43.6790°N 79.2827°W

Information
- School type: Catholic High school
- Motto: Fidelitas in Arduis (Faith in Hard Times)
- Religious affiliations: Roman Catholic (Holy Ghost Fathers)
- Founded: 1958
- Sister school: Notre Dame
- School board: Toronto Catholic District School Board
- Superintendent: Ryan Peterson; Area 8
- Area trustee: Nancy Crawford; Ward 12
- School number: 502 / 734080
- Principal: Sandra Mudryj
- Grades: 9-12
- Enrolment: 740 (2023–24)
- Language: English
- Colours: Maroon and Gray
- Team name: Neil Maroons
- Parish: St. John
- Specialist High Skills Major: Construction; Health and Wellness; Information and Communications Technology
- Program Focus: Broad-based Technology; Gifted; Advanced Placement; Student Leadership; Athletics
- Website: www.tcdsb.org/o/neilmcneil

Neil McNeil Catholic High School is an all-boys Roman Catholic secondary school in Toronto, Ontario, Canada. It is named after Neil McNeil, the Roman Catholic Archbishop of Vancouver from 1910 to 1912 and Roman Catholic Archbishop of Toronto from 1912 to 1934. It is administered by the Toronto Catholic District School Board (TCDSB), formerly the Metropolitan Separate School Board.

Neil McNeil is one of 31 high schools run by the TCDSB and one of four all-boys schools, and has an enrollment of 740 students. The school offers a Broad-based technology centre, cooperative education program, and one of the largest visual arts studios in the city.

This school is a sister school to Notre Dame High School.

== History ==
In 1954, six Holy Ghost Fathers came from Ireland. Their original purpose was to get missionaries, as Archbishop James Charles McGuigan wanted an all-boys school in east Toronto and the first high school in Scarborough, which was founded in 1958 by the Holy Ghost Fathers. The school was named after Neil McNeil, Archbishop of Toronto from 1912 to 1934. During his entire term as Archbishop, he fought tirelessly for the extension of funding for Catholic secondary schools. He demonstrated in both words and deeds the school motto “Fidelitas in Arduis”, which translates to “Faith In Hard Times”.

The Toronto Catholic District School Board acquired Neil McNeil's school facilities from the Spiritans in 2009.

=== Threatened closure and possible relocation ===
Neil McNeil was one of five schools in the Toronto Catholic District School Board that underwent a school accommodation review in June 2009 for possible consolidation, relocation, or closure, either having too many or too few students. In December, the board decided to close two schools and relocate another.

The school's parent council co-chair, Nicole Waldron, said the group was opposed to one of the three options presented by the board for students from Neil to be relocated from Victoria Park and Kingston Road near the Scarborough Bluffs to St. Patrick (on the former Lakeview Secondary School grounds) in the Greenwood and Danforth Avenues area. He stated that “We are here tonight to say that the history of closing schools must end in this process. We are not here to close and to relocate Neil McNeil,” Waldron told a boisterous crowd of about 400 people at a public meeting on January 7 at Neil. The review of the east-end schools came into light because there are too many students at Cardinal Newman, Neil McNeil, Notre Dame and Jean Vanier and too few students at St. Patrick. However, both the sites of Jean Vanier and St. Patrick are currently owned by the Toronto District School Board via the Toronto Lands Corporation (TLC) realtor arm if returned while the Newman property and land is owned by St. Augustine's Seminary.

== Notable alumni ==
- Javier Acevedo, Olympic Swimmer, Rio 2016 Summer Olympics
- Paul Beirne, sports executive, Toronto Raptors, Toronto FC, Brighton Hove & Albion FC, Pacific FC
- David Bourque, musician, Toronto Symphony Orchestra
- John Candy, comedic actor
- Andrew Cash, singer-songwriter and former Member of Parliament (New Democratic Party)
- Andre Champagne, former NHL player
- Sebastian Clovis, former CFL player and current TV Personality
- Mike Corbett, former NHL player
- Mike Corrigan, former NHL player
- Mike Del Grande, current chair of the TCDSB, former city councillor
- Gary Dineen, former NHL player
- Liam Foudy, NHL player
- Lawrence Gowan, musician, STYX
- Derek Lee, former Member of Parliament
- Billy MacMillan, former NHL player
- Keith Martin, former Member of Parliament
- Jim McKenny, former NHL player
- Gerry Meehan, former NHL player
- Jamaal Myers, Toronto city councillor
- Brad Park, Hall of Fame NHL player
- Rod Seiling, former NHL player
- Gary Smith, former NHL player
- Elvis Thomas, former member of the Canadian National Soccer Team
- Mike Walton, former NHL player
- Kobe Franklin, current member of the Toronto FC

== See also ==
- Education in Ontario
- List of secondary schools in Ontario
- Toronto Neil McNeil Maroons
