= Toronto Skillz FC =

Canadian soccer team

Toronto Skillz FC / Scarborough Town FC
- Full name: Toronto Skillz Soccer Academy
- Founded: 2008
- Stadium: Birchmount Stadium; Scarborough, Toronto, Ontario
- Capacity: 2000
- League: League1 Ontario
- 2019: League1 Ontario, 15th Playoffs: DNQ
- Website: http://www.torontoskillz.club/

Toronto Skillz FC is a Canadian semi-professional soccer club based in the Scarborough district of Toronto, Ontario. In 2024, their senior teams became known as Scarborough Town FC, while the youth clubs remained Toronto Skillz. The club was founded in 2008 and added its semi-professional club in League1 Ontario in 2016.

== History ==
Original club logo

Toronto Skillz was founded in 2008 in the south east corner of Toronto, in the former city of Scarborough.

The club joined the semi-professional League1 Ontario in 2016, naming former Trinidad and Tobago player Leslie Fitzpatrick as their coach. He coached the team until 2018, when he moved on to coach at George Brown College. They played their inaugural match on May 1, 2016, at home against Woodbridge Strikers and despite getting an early lead, lost by a score of 2-1.

Ahead of the 2022 season, it was announced that their League1 Ontario license was acquired Electric City FC of Peterborough. In February 2022, they announced that they would serve as one of Electric City's affiliates, operating a team in the League1 Ontario U21 Reserve Division, under the Skillz name, while wearing the Electric City crest on the sleeve.

In 2024, their senior teams became known as Scarborough Town FC to better connect to the Scarborough area of Toronto.

== Seasons ==
Season	League	Teams	Record	Rank	Playoffs	League Cup	Ref
2016	League1 Ontario	16	4–3–15	7th, Eastern (15th)	did not qualify	Quarter-finals	
2017	League1 Ontario	16	4–0–18	7th, Eastern (14th)	did not qualify	Round of 16	
2018	League1 Ontario	17	4–2–10	12th	did not qualify	Round of 16	
2019	League1 Ontario	16	2–1–12	15th	did not qualify	–	
2020	Season cancelled due to COVID-19 pandemic						
2021	League1 Ontario Summer Championship	11	1–2–4	10th	–	–	

== Notable former players ==
The following players have either played at the professional or international level, either before or after playing for the League1 Ontario team:

- (Guyana) Julien Edwards
- (Trinidad and Tobago) Leslie Fitzpatrick
- (Guyana) Javier George
- (Saint Vincent and the Grenadines) Tristan Marshall
- (Japan) Chihiro Noda
