= David Clanachan =

1st commissioner of the Canadian Premier League
- In office January 10, 2018 – January 10, 2022
- Preceded by: Office established
- Succeeded by: Mark Noonan

Personal details
- Born: 1962 (age 63–64) Windsor, Ontario, Canada
- Education: University of Windsor

David F. Clanachan (born 1962) was the commissioner of the Canadian Premier League (CPL) from 2018 to 2022. As Commissioner, Clanachan oversaw all aspects of the league along with the Canadian Soccer Business (CSB). Clanachan is also the Chairman of Restaurant Brands International, Canada. He was named president and chief operating officer of Tim Hortons in 2014, and has more than 35 years with the brand. Clanachan holds a Bachelor of Commerce degree from the University of Windsor.
