= Álvaro Rivero =

Spanish footballer

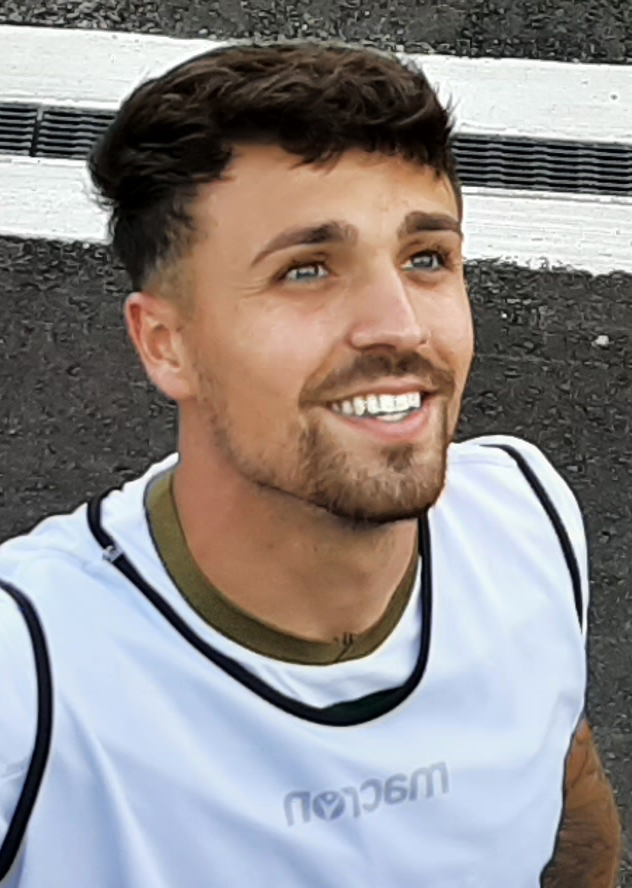
- Rivero in 2021

Personal information
- Full name: Álvaro Rivero Sánchez
- Date of birth: 17 April 1997 (age 29)
- Place of birth: Madrid, Spain
- Height: 1.71 m (5 ft 7 in)
- Position: Forward

Team information
- Current team: Puente Genil
- Number: 24

Youth career
- 2003–2005: Lugo Fuenlabrada
- 2005–2016: Real Madrid

Senior career*
Years	Team	Apps	(Gls)
2014–2015	Real Madrid C	9	(1)
2016–2017	Rayo Vallecano B	13	(0)
2017–2018	Inter Madrid	26	(13)
2018	Las Palmas Atlético	7	(0)
2019–2020	Getafe B	32	(5)
2020	Leganés B	4	(0)
2020–2021	York United	31	(7)
2022–2023	Gerena	34	(13)
2023–2024	Antoniano	25	(5)
2024–2025	Torre del Mar	12	(2)
2025	L'Hospitalet	12	(4)
2025–2026	Unión Adarve	17	(3)
2026–	Puente Genil	9	(0)
- * Club domestic league appearances and goals as of 15 May 2026

Álvaro Rivero Sánchez (born 17 April 1997) is a Spanish professional footballer who plays as a forward for Segunda Federación club Puente Genil.

== Early life ==
Rivero was born in Madrid, and began playing organised football in 2003 with local club Lugo Fuenlabrada.

== Club career ==
=== Real Madrid ===
In 2005, Rivero joined the academy system of Real Madrid. On 7 December 2014, he made his senior debut with Real Madrid C in the Tercera División in a match against Atlético Madrid C. On 1 March 2015, he scored his first senior goal for the C team in a match against Internacional de Madrid. He made a total of nine appearances for the C team that season, scoring one goal.

In the 2015–16 season, Rivero played for Real Madrid's U19 side in the UEFA Youth League, scoring two goals in four continental appearances.

=== York United ===
On 27 July 2020, Rivero signed with Canadian Premier League side York9, which became known as York United prior to the 2021 season. He made his debut on August 15 against Atlético Ottawa. At the end of the 2021 CPL season, York announced they had declined Rivero's contract option, ending his time at the club after two seasons.

== Career statistics ==
As of 3 January 2024

Appearances and goals by club, season and competition
Club	Season	League			National cup		Other (Note: Includes appearances in the 2019 Tercera División play-offs and Canadian Premier League playoffs.)		Total	
Club	Season	Division	Apps	Goals	Apps	Goals	Apps	Goals	Apps	Goals
Real Madrid C	2014–15	Tercera División	9	1	—		0	0	9	1
Rayo Vallecano B	2016–17	Tercera División	13	0	—		0	0	13	0
Inter Madrid	2017–18	Tercera División	26	13	—		0	0	26	13
Las Palmas Atlético	2018–19	Segunda División B	7	0	—		0	0	7	0
Getafe B	2018–19	Tercera División	20	5	—		2	0	22	5
Getafe B	2019–20	Segunda División B	12	0	—		0	0	12	0
Getafe B	Total		32	5	0	0	2	0	34	5
Leganés B	2019–20	Tercera División	4	0	—		0	0	4	0
York United	2020	Canadian Premier League	7	1	0	0	0	0	7	1
York United	2021	Canadian Premier League	24	6	2	0	1	0	27	6
York United	Total		31	7	2	0	1	0	34	7
Gerena	2021–22	Tercera Federación	5	4	0	0	0	0	5	4
Gerena	2022–23	Tercera Federación	29	9	0	0	0	0	29	9
Gerena	Total		34	13	0	0	0	0	34	13
Antoniano	2023–24	Segunda Federación	9	1	0	0	0	0	9	1
Career total			165	40	2	0	3	0	170	40
