= Ijah Halley =

Canadian soccer player (born 2001)

Personal information
- Full name: Ijah Halley
- Date of birth: August 14, 2001 (age 25)
- Place of birth: Brampton, Ontario, Canada
- Height: 1.87 m (6 ft 2 in)
- Positions: Winger; full-back

Team information
- Current team: Simcoe County Rovers FC

Youth career
- Woodbridge Strikers
- Erin Mills SC
- 2017–2020: Toronto FC

Senior career*
Years	Team	Apps	(Gls)
2020–2021	York United (Note: York9 FC changed its name to York United FC in 2021)	18	(0)
2022	Scrosoppi FC	12	(3)
2023–	Simcoe County Rovers FC	36	(7)
- * Club domestic league appearances and goals as of September 2, 2024

Ijah Halley (born August 14, 2001) is a Canadian professional soccer player who plays as a winger for Simcoe County Rovers FC in League1 Ontario.

== Early life ==
Halley played youth soccer with the Woodbridge Strikers and Erin Mills SC. Halley joined the Toronto FC Academy in 2017 and featured with the second team Toronto FC II during some pre-season and exhibition matches.

== Club career ==
In April 2020, Halley signed his first professional contract with Canadian Premier League side York9 (which became York United the following year) on a multi-year deal. He made his debut on August 15 against Atlético Ottawa, coming on as a substitute. After the 2021 season, Halley's contract expired with the club and although the club remained in negotiations for a new contract, they did not come to an agreement.

In 2022, he joined Scrosoppi FC in League1 Ontario.

In March 2023, he joined League1 Ontario side Simcoe County Rovers FC.

== Career statistics ==
As of September 6, 2024

Club	Season	League			Playoffs		Domestic Cup		League Cup		Total	
Club	Season	Division	Apps	Goals	Apps	Goals	Apps	Goals	Apps	Goals	Apps	Goals
York United FC	2020	Canadian Premier League	4	0	—		—		—		4	0
York United FC	2021	Canadian Premier League	14	0	1	0	1	0	—		16	0
York United FC	Total		18	0	1	0	1	0	0	0	20	0
Scrosoppi FC	2022	League1 Ontario	12	3	0	0	—		—		12	3
Simcoe County Rovers FC	2023	League1 Ontario	17	0	2	0	—		—		19	0
Simcoe County Rovers FC	2024	League1 Ontario	19	3	—		1	0	3	0	23	3
Simcoe County Rovers FC	Total		36	3	2	0	1	0	3	0	42	3
Career total			66	6	3	0	2	0	3	0	74	6
