= Paul Beirne =

Canadian sports executive

President of the Canadian Premier League
- In office January 23, 2018 – November 2, 2019

Personal details
- Born: April 16, 1966 (age 60) Toronto, Ontario, Canada
- Education: Neil McNeil High School; York University

Paul Beirne (born April 16, 1966) is a Canadian sports executive, who is currently the managing director of Pacific FC.

He has also worked with the Toronto Raptors of the National Basketball Association, the Toronto Maple Leafs and the Ottawa Senators of the National Hockey League, Toronto FC of Major League Soccer, and Brighton & Hove Albion of the Premier League.

== Career ==
=== Toronto Raptors ===
Beirne was appointed as director of ticketing for the Toronto Raptors of the National Basketball Association in August 1994. He spent two years in the role before being promoted within Maple Leaf Sports & Entertainment.

=== Toronto Maple Leafs ===
In September 1996, he became director of servicing for Maple Leaf Sports & Entertainment after two years – working with both the Toronto Raptors and the Toronto Maple Leafs. In 10 years with the team, Beirne handled all aspects of service, renewals, season tickets, group sales and single tickets for the Raptors and the Maple Leafs.

=== Toronto FC ===
In February 2006, Beirne became the first employee of Major League Soccer club Toronto FC as vice president for business operations. He was responsible for the launch and management of the team, overseeing brand development, positioning and launching.

In April 2007, Beirne oversaw the opening of BMO Field, and he later sold out international friendlies against Aston Villa, Bolton Wanderers, Benfica, Indepentiente, River Plate and Pachuca. Later that year, he was awarded the Doug Hamilton Executive of the Year.

In August 2008, he organised the 2008 MLS All-Star Game against West Ham United, and in August 2009, sold Canada's highest grossing soccer game when Toronto hosted Real Madrid. Beirne later oversaw the design, acquisition and construction of Toronto's training ground for the senior and academy teams.

He was part of the local organizing committee for the 2007 FIFA Under-20 World Cup, and was appointed to MLS Technical Committee in 2008 and MLS Business Committee a year later.

=== Ottawa Senators ===
In November 2013, Beirne was hired as vice president for sales and service for National Hockey League club Ottawa Senators.

=== Brighton & Hove Albion ===
In April 2014, Beirne moved to England to become the Head of Commercial Development at Premier League club Brighton & Hove Albion. He focused on managing and growing all commercial revenue for the club, community and charity. During his time at the club, Brighton were named finalists in four categories for the Football Business Awards – best matchday experience, best fan engagement by a club, best marketing of a football club, and best non-matchday use of a venue. Beirne left the club after two seasons to return to Canada in July 2016.

=== Canadian Premier League ===
In August 2016, Beirne was named as the first employee of the Canadian Premier League. In the temporary role of project manager, he spent 18 months developing the league and working with several emerging supporters groups.

On January 23, 2018, it was announced that Beirne had been appointed as the league's first president. He would handle the day-to-day league operations and focus on ensuring a successful launch in April 2019.

=== Pacific FC ===
In August 2022, Beirne was named as the managing director of Pacific FC.

== Honours ==
- Doug Hamilton Executive of the Year: 2007

== Personal life ==
Beirne graduated from Neil McNeil High School in 1984, and studied at York University between 1986 and 1990. He is married and lives in Toronto, Ontario.
