= Chihiro Noda =

Japanese footballer

Chihiro Noda 野田 智裕
Personal information
- Date of birth: August 17, 1988 (age 38)
- Place of birth: Kumamoto, Japan
- Height: 1.76 m (5 ft 9 in)
- Positions: Striker; midfielder

Youth career
- 2001–2003: Koshi Junior Highschool
- 2004–2006: Ohzu Highschool
- 2007–2008: Teikyo University

Senior career*
Years	Team	Apps	(Gls)
2010	FC Shinjuku	10	(3)
2011	C.A.Las Palmas	20	(4)
2012	Swan United	22	(5)
2013	Koshi PERNA	12	(8)
2014	MAJ FC	25	(12)
2015	JP Voltes	20	(23)
2016	Mid-Isle Mariners	10	(10)
2017	Toronto Skillz FC	5	(3)
2017	Royal Toronto FC	12	(1)
2018	Portugal AC	9	(1)
2018–	Humber Hawks	9	(1)
- * Club domestic league appearances and goals

Chihiro Noda (野田 智裕, Noda Chihiro; born August 17, 1988) is a Japanese soccer player who plays as a striker or midfielder. In 2015, he got the Golden boot (Top Goal Scorer) in the Philippines.

== Career ==
=== C.A. Las Palmas ===
Noda was born in Kumamoto, Japan. He played for Club Atlético Las Palmas in Argentina. After the season, joined a training for Instituto Atlético Central Córdoba and he has played and lived with Paulo Dybala.

=== Swan United ===
After joined tryouts in the US, Noda signed for Swan United in the Football West in Australia as a semi-professional. Noda usually played in central midfield and scored five goals this season.

=== Manila All Japan FC and JP Voltes ===
Noda played in his hometown and he finally signed with Manila All-Japan F.C. as a professional football player in 2014. He played 25 matches, scored 12 goals in the season.

In January 2015, Manila All-Japan F.C. changed their name for JP Voltes F.C. Noda played as a striker from this season then scored 18 goals and got the Golden Boot in the regular season. The promotion play-offs against Team Socceroo FC, he scored five goals and JP Voltes F.C. won over to promote for Division 1.

=== Toronto Skillz FC ===
In Mar 2017, Noda announced on his blogs that he signed a contract with Toronto Skillz FC which belongs to League1 Ontario, 3rd division in Canada.

=== Royal Toronto FC ===
In June 2017, Noda transferred from Toronto Skillz FC to Royal Toronto FC which belongs to Canadian Soccer League in Canada.

=== Portugal AC ===
2018 played in the Arena Premier League for Portugal AC.

=== Humber Hawks ===
In the Autumn 2018, he went to study at Humber College and played for the soccer team.

== Honours ==
Individual

- 2015 United Football League Golden Boot

== Links ==
- Chihiro Noda PV 2015
- Chihiro Noda Top 10 Goals
- Chihiro Noda 2014 season PV
