= Leslie Fitzpatrick =

Trinidadian soccer player

Personal information
- Date of birth: November 11, 1978 (age 47)
- Place of birth: Port of Spain, Trinidad and Tobago
- Height: 5 ft 6 in (1.68 m)
- Positions: Defender; midfielder

College career
Years	Team	Apps	(Gls)
1997–2000	Columbia Lions		

Senior career*
Years	Team	Apps	(Gls)
2002	Cincinnati Riverhawks		
2003	Columbus Shooting Stars	12	(5)
2004	Atlanta Silverbacks	27	(2)
2005–2006	Real Salt Lake	18	(0)
2006	Puerto Rico Islanders	0	(0)
2007	W Connection		
2008–2010	Rochester Rhinos	56	(3)
2010	North East Stars F.C.	4	(?)
2011	Ma Pau Stars S.C.	?	(3)
2017	Toronto Skillz FC	15	(1)

International career
2004–2007	Trinidad and Tobago	33	(1)

Managerial career
- 2018–2021: George Brown Huskies (women's)
- * Club domestic league appearances and goals

Leslie "Tiger" Fitzpatrick (born November 11, 1978) is a Trinidadian former professional soccer player who played as a defender or midfielder.

== Club career ==
=== College ===
Fitzpatrick was born in Port of Spain. He came to the United States to play college soccer, and spent four years at Columbia University, where he was named All-Ivy League his senior year. In 2016, Leslie received his Masters of Science in Education with a focus in Sports Administration from the University of Miami.

=== Professional ===
Fitzpatrick played with the A-League's Cincinnati Riverhawks in 2002, the Columbus Shooting Stars in 2003 and the Atlanta Silverbacks in 2004, before signing with Real Salt Lake prior to team's inaugural season in 2005.

Fitzpatrick only a year in MLS, and signed a short-term contract with the Puerto Rico Islanders at the end of 2006. In May 2007 he signed with TT Pro League club W Connection until the end of 2007., and signed for the Rochester Rhinos of the USL First Division in 2008.

== International career ==
After representing the country on various youth levels, Fitzpatrick made his debut for the Trinidad and Tobago national football team on November 24, 2004, against Puerto Rico. He scored his first and only international goal thus far against Saint Vincent and the Grenadines on January 5, 2005, at the Digicel Caribbean Cup 2005. He has earned 33 caps for the Soca Warriors as of June 23, 2008.

== Coaching career ==
He became head coach of Toronto Skillz FC of League1 Ontario in Canada. In 2017, he used himself as a player. In 2018, he became the head coach of the George Brown College women's soccer team.

== Career statistics ==
Scores and results list T&T's goal tally first.

#	Date	Venue	Opponent	Score	Result	Competition
1	2005-01-05	Marabella, Trinidad and Tobago	Saint Vincent and the Grenadines	2–1	3–1	Digicel Caribbean Cup 2005
