= 2021 Canadian Championship =

2021 professional soccer tournament

Championnat canadien 2021

Tournament details
- Country: Canada
- Dates: August 15 – November 21
- Teams: 13 (from 4 leagues)

Final positions
- Champions: CF Montréal (4th title)
- Runners-up: Toronto FC

Tournament statistics
- Matches played: 12
- Goals scored: 38 (3.17 per match)
- Attendance: 51,738 (4,312 per match)
- Top goal scorer(s): Austin Ricci (3 goals)

Awards
- George Gross Memorial Trophy: Sebastian Breza
- Best young player: Jacob Shaffelburg

The 2021 Canadian Championship was the fourteenth edition of the Canadian Championship, contested from August 15 to November 21, 2021. The winners of the tournament, CF Montréal, were awarded the Voyageurs Cup and earned a berth in the 2022 CONCACAF Champions League.

== Format ==
The competition followed a similar format to the originally proposed 2020 edition with four rounds and regional pairings in the first two rounds. For the first time in the Canadian Championship, each tie was played as a single-leg fixture. CF Montréal, Forge FC, and Toronto FC entered the tournament in the quarter-finals due to their placements in the 2019 and 2020 editions of the competition. All other teams entered in the preliminary round of the tournament.

AS Blainville and Master's FA were originally supposed to participate in the 2020 edition of the competition, as they won the 2019 editions of the Première ligue de soccer du Québec and League1 Ontario, respectively. As the format of the 2020 edition was revised, their participation was postponed to the 2021 tournament.

=== Distribution ===
Distribution of teams for 2021 Canadian Championship
Round	Teams entering in this round	Teams advancing from previous round
Preliminary round (10 teams)	1 champion of 2019 League1 Ontario season; 1 champion of 2019 Première ligue de soccer du Québec season; 7 Canadian Premier League teams; 1 Major League Soccer team	
Quarter-finals (8 teams)	1 winner of the 2019 Canadian Championship; 2 finalists of the 2020 Canadian Championship	5 winners from the preliminary round
Semi-finals (4 teams)		4 winners from the quarter-finals
Final (2 teams)		2 winners from the semi-finals

== Teams ==
2021 Canadian Championship (Canada)
Montréal area clubs: AS Blainville; CF Montréal
Toronto area clubs: Toronto FC; Master's FA; York United FC

Canadian Premier League Major League Soccer Other

Team	Location	League	Round of entry	Previous best	Prior appearances
AS Blainville	Blainville, Quebec	Première ligue de soccer du Québec	Preliminary round	Second qualifying round: 1	2
Atlético Ottawa	Ottawa, Ontario	Canadian Premier League	Preliminary round	N/A	0
Cavalry FC	Foothills County, Alberta	Canadian Premier League	Preliminary round	Semi-finals: 1	1
FC Edmonton	Edmonton, Alberta	Canadian Premier League	Preliminary round	Semi-finals: 5	8
Forge FC	Hamilton, Ontario	Canadian Premier League	Quarter-finals	Second qualifying round: 1	1
HFX Wanderers FC	Halifax, Nova Scotia	Canadian Premier League	Preliminary round	Third qualifying round: 1	1
Master's FA	Toronto, Ontario	League1 Ontario	Preliminary round	N/A	0
CF Montréal	Montreal, Quebec	Major League Soccer	Quarter-finals	Champions: 4	12
Pacific FC	Langford, British Columbia	Canadian Premier League	Preliminary round	First qualifying round: 1	1
Toronto FC	Toronto, Ontario	Major League Soccer	Quarter-finals	Champions: 7	12
Valour FC	Winnipeg, Manitoba	Canadian Premier League	Preliminary round	Second qualifying round: 1	1
Vancouver Whitecaps FC	Vancouver, British Columbia	Major League Soccer	Preliminary round	Champions: 1	12
York United FC	Toronto, Ontario	Canadian Premier League	Preliminary round	Third qualifying round: 1	1

Note

- Statistics include previous incarnations of FC Edmonton, Montreal Impact, and Vancouver Whitecaps
- Appearances in the 2020 Canadian Championship are not included for Toronto FC and Forge FC because it was not played until 2022

== Schedule ==
Round	Dates	Teams
Preliminary round	August 15–26	10 (Atlético Ottawa, AS Blainville, Cavalry FC, FC Edmonton, HFX Wanderers FC, Master's FA, Pacific FC, Valour FC, Vancouver Whitecaps FC, York United FC)
Quarter-finals	September 14–22	8 (Cavalry FC, CF Montréal, Forge FC, HFX Wanderers FC, Pacific FC, Toronto FC, Valour FC, York United FC)
Semi-finals	October 27 – November 3 (originally September 28–29)	4 (CF Montréal, Forge FC, Pacific FC, Toronto FC)
Final	November 21 (originally October 19–27)	2 (CF Montréal, Toronto FC)

== Bracket ==
The bracket was announced on July 19, 2021.

Preliminary round August 15–26
Ottawa, ON
CPL	Atlético Ottawa	2
CPL	Valour FC	3
Halifax, NS
CPL	HFX Wanderers FC	2
PLSQ	AS Blainville	1
Toronto (York Lions), ON
CPL	York United FC	5
L1O	Master's FA	0
Edmonton, AB
CPL	FC Edmonton	0
CPL	Cavalry FC	2
Langford, BC
CPL	Pacific FC	4
MLS	Vancouver Whitecaps FC	3

Quarter-finals; September 15–22
Hamilton, ON
CPL	Forge FC	2
CPL	Valour FC	1
Halifax, NS
CPL	HFX Wanderers FC	1
MLS	CF Montréal	3
Toronto (BMO), ON
MLS	Toronto FC	4
CPL	York United FC	0
Foothills County, AB
CPL	Cavalry FC	0
CPL	Pacific FC	1

Semi-finals; October 27 – November 3
Hamilton, ON
CPL	Forge FC	0 (7)
MLS	CF Montréal (p)	0 (8)
Toronto (BMO), ON
MLS	Toronto FC	2
CPL	Pacific FC	1

Final; November 21
Montreal, QC
MLS	CF Montréal	1
MLS	Toronto FC	0

== Preliminary round ==
=== Summary ===
The preliminary round matches were held between August 15 and 26, 2021.

Team 1	Score	Team 2
FC Edmonton	0–2	Cavalry FC
HFX Wanderers	2–1	AS Blainville
York United FC	5–0	Master's FA
Atlético Ottawa	2–3	Valour FC
Pacific FC	4–3	Vancouver Whitecaps FC

=== Matches ===
August 15
3:00 pm MDT

FC Edmonton	0–2	Cavalry FC
	Report	Mason 31'; Fisk 62'

Clarke Stadium, Edmonton, Alberta
Attendance: 1,189
Referee: Yusri Rudolf

August 17
7:00 pm ADT

HFX Wanderers FC	2–1	AS Blainville
Bent 10'; Morelli 72' (pen.)	Report	Essomé Penda 52' (pen.)

Wanderers Grounds, Halifax, Nova Scotia
Attendance: 3,780
Referee: Ben Hoskins

August 21
3:00 pm EDT

York United FC	5–0	Master's FA
Ferrari 38'; Ramírez 45+2'; Wilson 59'; Ulbricht 85' (pen.), 90+1'	Report

York Lions Stadium, Toronto, Ontario
Attendance: 1,102
Referee: Scott Bowman

August 21
7:00 pm EDT

Atlético Ottawa	2–3	Valour FC
Wright 16'; Martínez 90+2'	Report	Rea 30'; Ricci 60', 63'

TD Place Stadium, Ottawa, Ontario
Attendance: 2,881
Referee: Pierre-Luc Lauzière

August 26
7:00 pm PDT

Pacific FC	4–3	Vancouver Whitecaps FC
Campbell 8' (pen.); Aparicio 28'; Heard 63'; Díaz 75'	Report	Gauld 14', 66'; Dájome 90+8'

Starlight Stadium, Langford, British Columbia
Attendance: 4,997
Referee: Juan Marquez

== Quarter-finals ==
=== Summary ===
Team 1	Score	Team 2
Forge FC	2–1	Valour FC
HFX Wanderers FC	1–3	CF Montréal
Toronto FC	4–0	York United FC
Cavalry FC	0–1	Pacific FC

=== Matches ===
September 15
7:30 pm EDT

Forge FC	2–1	Valour FC
Choinière 33'; Pacius 38'	Report	Ricci 60'

Tim Hortons Field, Hamilton, Ontario
Attendance: 2,681
Referee: David Barrie

September 22
6:00 pm ADT

HFX Wanderers FC	1–3	CF Montréal
Bent 27'	Report	Miljevic 35'; Tabla 89', 90+2'

Wanderers Grounds, Halifax, Nova Scotia
Attendance: 6,413
Referee: Yusri Rudolf

September 22
7:30 pm EDT

Toronto FC	4–0	York United FC
Osorio 34'; Achara 41'; Soteldo 84' (pen.); Okello 89'	Report

BMO Field, Toronto, Ontario
Attendance: 3,651
Referee: Juan Marquez

September 22
8:00 pm MDT

Cavalry FC	0–1	Pacific FC
	Report	Campbell 33'

ATCO Field, Foothills County, Alberta
Attendance: 2,525
Referee: Alain Ruch

== Semi-finals ==
=== Summary ===
Team 1	Score	Team 2
Forge FC	0–0 (7–8 p)	CF Montréal
Toronto FC	2–1	Pacific FC

=== Matches ===
October 27
7:30 pm EDT

Forge FC	0–0	CF Montréal
	Report
Penalties
Babouli (penalty missed); Krutzen (penalty scored); Awuah (penalty missed); Cissé (penalty scored); Bekker (penalty scored); Browne (penalty missed); Choinière (penalty scored); Navarro (penalty scored); Samuel (penalty scored); Achinioti-Jönsson (penalty scored); Henry (penalty missed)	7–8	(penalty scored) Lappalainen; (penalty missed) Johnsen; (penalty missed) Tabla; (penalty scored) Camacho; (penalty scored) Zouhir; (penalty missed) Piette; (penalty scored) Struna; (penalty scored) Bassong; (penalty scored) Bayiha; (penalty scored) Waterman; (penalty scored) Breza

Tim Hortons Field, Hamilton, Ontario
Attendance: 5,388
Referee: Yusri Rudolf

November 3
7:30 pm EDT

Toronto FC	2–1	Pacific FC
Altidore 15'; Shaffelburg 26'	Report	Díaz 83'

BMO Field, Toronto, Ontario
Attendance: 5,131
Referee: Pierre-Luc Lauzière

== Final ==
November 21, 2021
1:00 pm EST

CF Montréal	1–0	Toronto FC
Quioto 72'	Report

Saputo Stadium, Montreal, Quebec
Attendance: 12,000
Referee: David Gantar

== Top goalscorers ==
Team eliminated or did not play in this round.

Rank	Player	Team	Goals	By round			
Rank	Player	Team	Goals	PR	QF	SF	F
1	(Canada) Austin Ricci	Valour FC	3	2	1		
2	(England) Cory Bent	HFX Wanderers FC	2	1	1		
2	(Canada) Terran Campbell	Pacific FC	2	1	1		
2	(Mexico) Alejandro Díaz	Pacific FC	2	1		1	
2	(Scotland) Ryan Gauld	Vancouver Whitecaps FC	2	2			
2	(Canada) Ballou Tabla	CF Montréal	2		2		
2	(Germany) Julian Ulbricht	York United FC	2	2			

== Awards ==
- George Gross Memorial Trophy: (Canada) Sebastian Breza (CF Montréal)
- Best Young Canadian Player Award: (Canada) Jacob Shaffelburg (Toronto FC)
