= Osvaldo Ramírez (footballer, born 1997) =

American soccer player

Personal information
- Full name: Osvaldo Ramírez Ramírez
- Date of birth: May 13, 1997 (age 29)
- Place of birth: Wisconsin, United States
- Height: 1.86 m (6 ft 1 in)
- Position: Forward

Team information
- Current team: Green Bay Glory

Youth career
- –2017: Chiapas

Senior career*
Years	Team	Apps	(Gls)
2017–2018	Pachuca Premier	21	(2)
2018–2019	UNACH	29	(15)
2019	UAC	6	(0)
2020	UAZ	13	(0)
2020	Cafetaleros de Chiapas	15	(5)
2020–2021	Cancún	4	(0)
2021	York United	18	(1)
2024–	Green Bay Glory		
- * Club domestic league appearances and goals as of November 15, 2021

Osvaldo Ramírez Ramírez (born May 13, 1997) is an American professional soccer player who currently plays for Midwest Premier League side Green Bay Glory.

== Club career ==
=== Cancún ===
During the 2020–21 season, Ramírez played for Liga de Expansión MX side Cancún, making four league appearances and one in the Reclasificación.

=== York United ===
On June 2, 2021, Ramírez signed with Canadian Premier League side York United. He made his debut for York on June 27, as a substitute against Cavalry FC in a 2–1 loss. Ramirez scored his first goal for the club against Master's FA on August 21, netting the second in an eventual 5–0 victory in a Canadian Championship match. In December 2021 after the conclusion of the 2021 season, York announced they had declined his contract option.

=== Green Bay Glory ===
In February 2024 it was confirmed, that Ramírez had moved to Green Bay Glory; a soccer club that until recently only had a women's team, but as of the 2024 season, established a men's team to compete in the Midwest Premier League.
