= Canadian Premier League =

Professional soccer league in Canada

- Founded: May 6, 2017; 9 years ago
- First season: 2019
- Country: Canada
- Confederation: CONCACAF (North American Football Union)
- Number of clubs: 8
- Level on pyramid: 1
- Domestic cup: Canadian Championship
- International cup: CONCACAF Champions Cup
- Current champions: Cavalry FC (2nd title) (2026)
- Current CPL Shield: Cavalry FC (3rd shield) (2026)
- Most championships: Forge FC (4 titles)
- Most CPL Shields: Cavalry FC; Forge FC (3 shields each)
- Most appearances: Marco Carducci (202)
- Top scorer: Alejandro Díaz (50)
- Broadcasters: OneSoccer; TSN (Canada); Fox/FS1/FS2 (United States)
- Website: cplsoccer.com
- Current: 2026 Canadian Premier League season

The Canadian Premier League (CPL or CanPL; French: Première ligue canadienne) is a professional men's soccer league in Canada and the highest level of the Canadian soccer league system. The league comprises eight teams, from five of Canada's ten provinces. Each team plays 28 games in the regular season, which is followed by playoffs culminating in the CPL Finals.

The CPL champion and regular season winner earn berths in the CONCACAF Champions Cup, competing against teams from across North America, Central America, and the Caribbean for a spot in the FIFA Club World Cup. All CPL teams also play in the Canadian Championship alongside Canadian clubs from other leagues. Qualification for the CONCACAF Champions Cup is also available to CPL clubs by winning the Canadian Championship.

The league was officially sanctioned by the Canadian Soccer Association on May 6, 2017, and has played an annual season since 2019. The league's focus is to improve national soccer talent and the sport in Canada, with several rules in place to ensure this. These include a minimum quota of Canadian players on team rosters and starting line-ups, requirements for domestic under-21 players, and a Canadian university draft.

The CPL's first season included seven teams, and an eighth, Atlético Ottawa, joined for the second season in 2020. Vancouver FC debuted in 2023, while FC Edmonton folded before the start of that season. Valour FC suspended operations following the 2025 season shortly after FC Supra du Québec announced they would join the league for the 2026 season. The CPL is headquartered in Toronto, Ontario.

== History ==
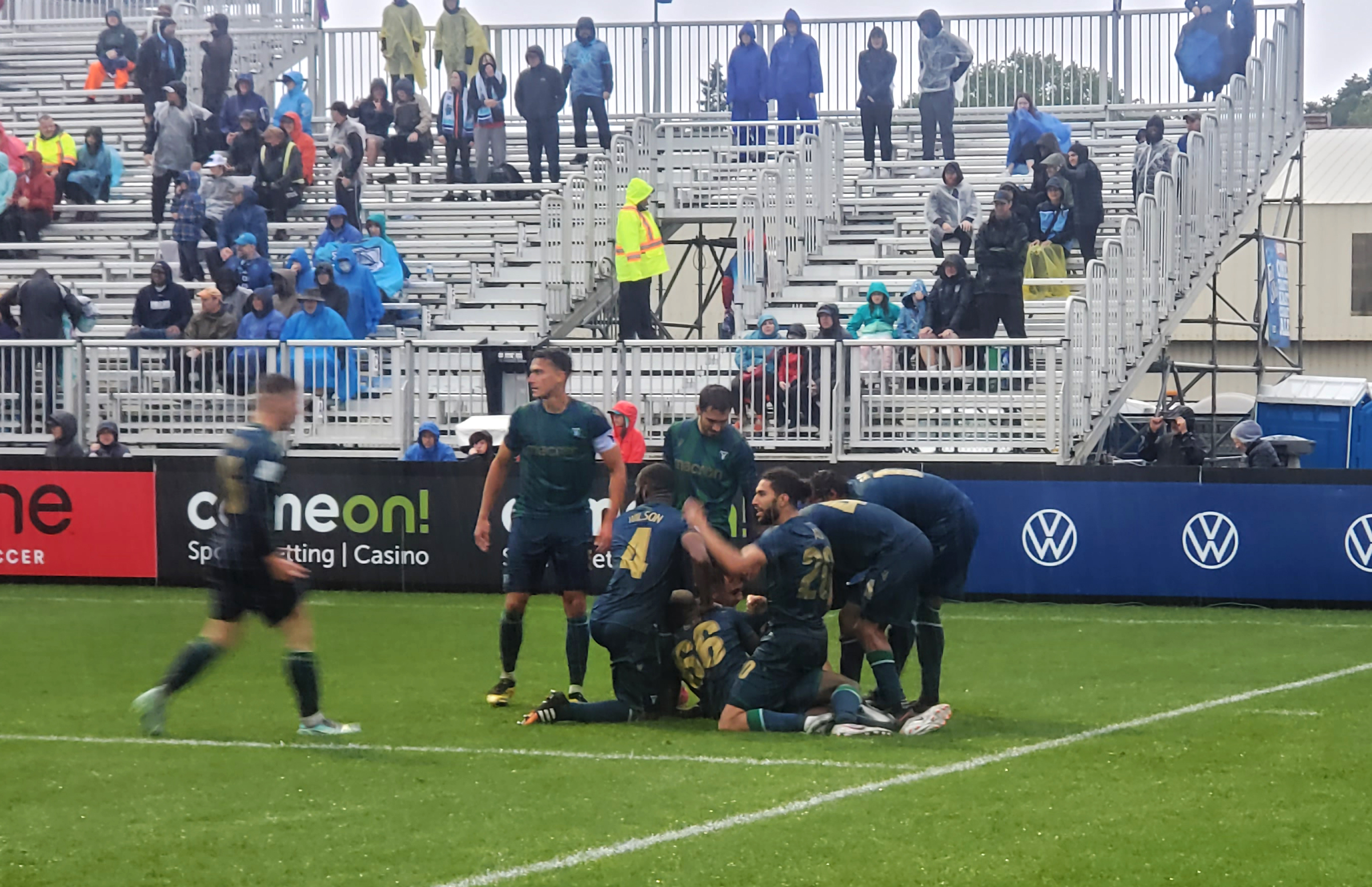
York United players celebrate a goal by Álvaro Rivero against HFX Wanderers during a game in September 2021.

After the closure of the original Canadian Soccer League in 1992, there was no fully professional first division domestic league of Canadian soccer. The only national Canadian competition was the Canadian Championship, a domestic cup which has been played since 2008. Canadian teams played in American leagues, such as Major League Soccer, NASL and the USL Championship, while the L1O and PLSQ were created as provincial-level leagues. A new version of the Canadian Soccer League was briefly sanctioned as a third-division semi-pro league by the CSA from 2010 to 2013, losing the sanction after the CSA board of directors adopted a new soccer structure in Canada.

A new fully professional Canadian soccer league was first publicly reported in June 2013. The reports suggested that Hamilton Tiger-Cats owner Bob Young was part of a core group of investors working with the Canadian Soccer Association and its president Victor Montagliani to create a new set of fully professional teams or a league in Canada. The Tiger-Cats ownership group was granted exclusive rights by the Canadian Soccer Association until 2017 to establish a team that would play in the under-construction Tim Hortons Field in Hamilton.

In February 2016, reports of the league emerged again when Young spoke to Hamilton City Council requesting permission to erect an air-dome over the Tim Hortons Field playing surface between December 1 and April 30 yearly to allow for year-round training for a professional soccer team owned by the Tiger-Cats that would call the stadium home. During questions by the elected council members, it was revealed that the name of the league would be the Canadian Premier League and that the Hamilton team was expected to be the flagship franchise. Further details were expected following the Canadian Soccer Association's annual meeting in May 2016. Reports in June 2016 indicated that the Canadian Premier League would avoid current Major League Soccer markets.

On November 14, the first official employee of the Canadian Premier League was announced. Paul Beirne, a Canadian who was also the first employee of Toronto FC, was hired as project manager for the new league. On May 6, 2017, the creation of the league was unanimously approved and sanctioned by the Canadian Soccer Association. Ownership groups in Winnipeg and Hamilton were also approved. On May 5, 2018, the Canadian Soccer Association accepted club memberships for Halifax, York Region, Calgary, and "Port City" (later confirmed to be based in Greater Victoria, rather than Surrey as speculated).

The unveiling of the first team, York9 FC, took place on May 10. This was followed by Calgary-based Cavalry FC on May 17, 2018, Halifax's HFX Wanderers FC on May 25, Valour FC in Winnipeg on June 6, and the rebranded former NASL side FC Edmonton on June 8. After a break from announcements to accommodate the 2018 FIFA World Cup, Hamilton's Forge FC was next unveiled on July 12, followed by Pacific FC of Langford in Greater Victoria on July 20.

On August 27, 2018, the CPL announced that it would hold a series of open tryouts in eight cities across Canada for players age 16 and older. The tryouts were led by Alex Bunbury and took place in front of CPL coaching staff from all teams. On September 28, 2018, Italian sportswear company Macron was announced as the official apparel supplier of the CPL. Macron supplies training gear and custom made kits for each CPL team.

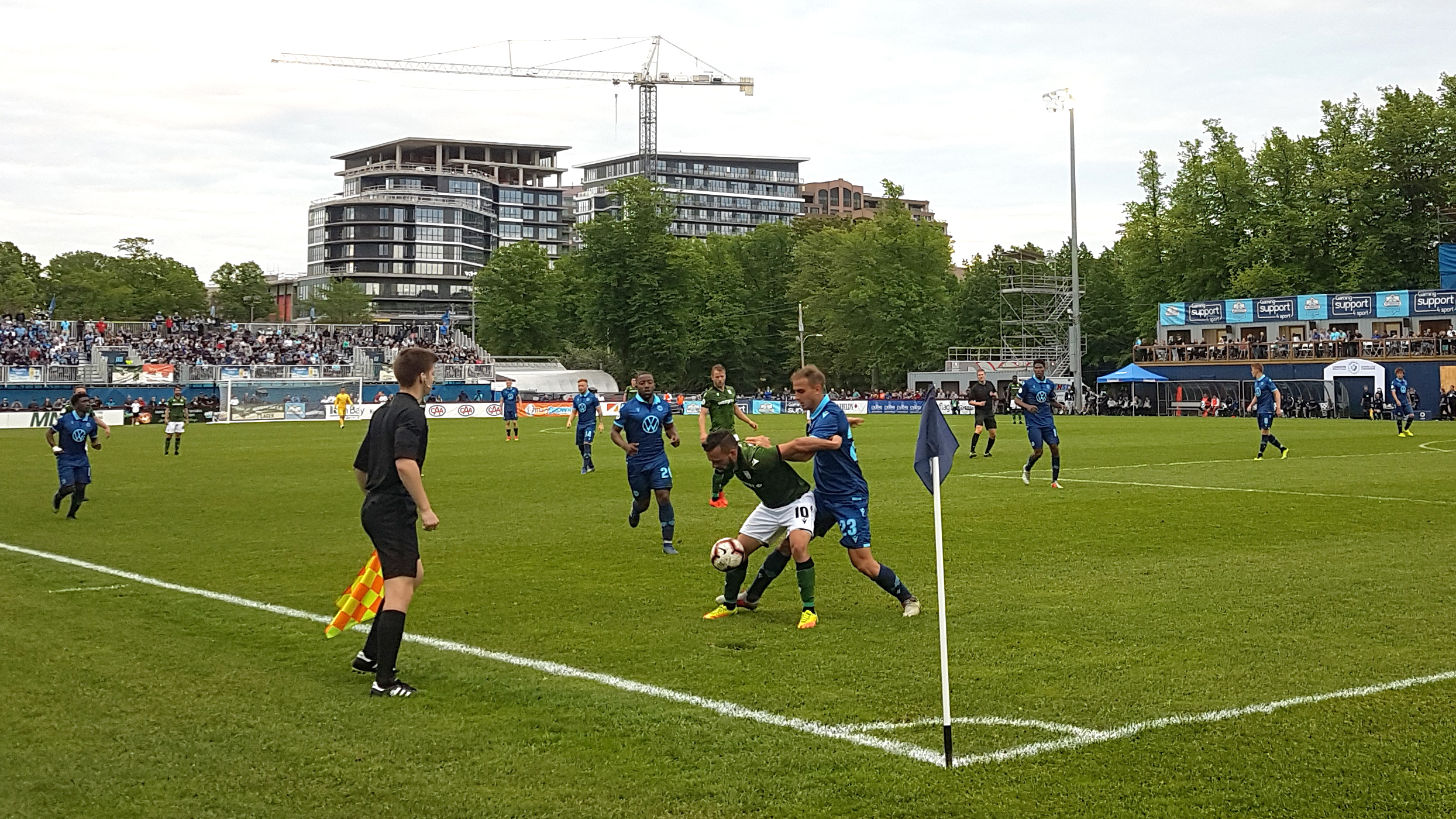
A match between HFX Wanderers FC and Cavalry FC during the CPL's inaugural season in 2019

=== Launch (2019–present) ===
The CPL's inaugural match between Forge FC and York9 FC took place at Tim Hortons Field on April 27, 2019, and resulted in a 1–1 draw. Ryan Telfer of York9 FC scored the first goal in Canadian Premier League history in the third minute of the inaugural match.

In advance of the 2019 Finals, the league's trophy was unveiled. The North Star Shield is a crystal shield engraved with the logo of the Canadian Premier League. The inaugural season finished on November 2, 2019, when Forge FC became the first Canadian Premier League Champions, defeating Cavalry FC 2–0 over two legs in the Finals. Forge midfielder Tristan Borges was named the first CPL Player of the Year.

On January 29, 2020, Atlético Ottawa was confirmed to be the first CPL expansion team, joining for the 2020 season. The 2020 season, set to start on April 11, was postponed indefinitely due to the COVID-19 pandemic. On July 29, it was announced that the entire 2020 season would be played in Charlottetown beginning August 13. The shortened 2020 season, known as "The Island Games" ended on September 19 when Forge FC won their second Canadian Premier League title in a 2–0 victory over HFX Wanderers.

The 2021 season did not begin until June 26 due to the COVID-19 pandemic; however, each team was able to play a full schedule of 28 matches. The season culminated with Pacific FC defeating Forge FC 1–0 in the 2021 Final, held in December.

On November 21, 2022, the Canadian Premier League announced that FC Edmonton would be removed from the league, effective immediately. The league commissioner cited poor on-field performance as well as low attendance and an outdated stadium as reasons for the termination. For the 2023 season, Vancouver FC from Langley, British Columbia entered the league, joining as an expansion team. Following the 2024 season, the league was valued at US$300M (CA$431M).

On November 21, 2025, Valour FC announced that the club was suspending operations. The league had been covering operational costs for the club since the 2024 season. The league will remain at eight clubs in 2026 with the addition of Greater Montreal-based FC Supra du Québec.

== Competition format ==
The inaugural 2019 season of the league included a split season format similar to soccer leagues in Latin America. The winners of the two seasons competed in the two-legged CPL Finals.

With the addition of an eighth club in 2020, the league moved to a single-season format with expanded playoffs. The Canadian Premier League regular season runs from April to October. Each team plays 28 games, including 14 at home and 14 away games. Since 2023, the top five teams in the regular season qualify for the playoffs to determine which two teams play in the final.

On multiple occasions, then-league commissioner David Clanachan stated his goal of having promotion and relegation in the Canadian soccer league system as more teams join the league.

=== Other competitions featuring CPL clubs ===
All Canadian Premier League teams also participate in Canada's domestic cup competition, the Canadian Championship. CPL teams compete against Canadian teams in Major League Soccer and Tier 3 league champions for a berth in the CONCACAF Champions Cup. Since 2023, the CPL regular season and playoff champion have also qualified for the Champions Cup. In 2026, Forge FC became the first CPL team to win the Canadian Championship.

From 2019 to 2022, one CPL club participated in the CONCACAF League against teams from Central America and the Caribbean for one of six spots in the CONCACAF Champions Cup. For the 2019 edition only, this slot was granted to one of the league's "inaugural teams" (FC Edmonton, Forge FC, or Valour FC) based on home-and-away matches amongst themselves in the 2019 spring season. In all other editions, the berth was awarded to the previous year's playoff champion.

Forge FC represented the CPL in CONCACAF League on three occasions. In the 2021 CONCACAF League, Forge advanced to the semi-finals of the competition to qualify for the 2022 CONCACAF Champions League, the first CPL club to do so.

== Clubs ==
Locations of current and former Canadian Premier League clubs

Eight clubs compete in the Canadian Premier League. Seven clubs competed in the inaugural season. Only FC Edmonton predated the CPL, having been members of the North American Soccer League, and also having competed in the Canadian Championship seven times before joining the league. The league expanded to eight teams with the addition of Atlético Ottawa in 2020. For 2023, Vancouver FC was added as an expansion club, while FC Edmonton was dissolved, keeping the league at eight clubs. Similarly, FC Supra du Québec joined the league as an expansion team in 2026, while Valour FC folded the same year.

The province of Ontario has three teams, British Columbia has two clubs, while Alberta, Quebec and Nova Scotia each have one. There are two pairs of rivalries between teams in the same province: the 905 Derby between Ontario's Forge FC and Inter Toronto FC, and the Pacific FC–Vancouver FC rivalry between the two BC-based clubs.

Matches between Pacific FC and HFX Wanderers FC require the third-longest away trips of any domestic professional soccer league in the world, with the two teams separated by 4,476 kilometres (2,781 mi). The 905 Derby, between Forge and Inter Toronto, is the shortest distance between two clubs in the CPL at 80 kilometres (50 mi).

Current clubs
Team	Location	Stadium	Capacity	Joined	Head coach
Atlético Ottawa	Ottawa, Ontario	TD Place Stadium	24,000	2020	Gustavo Leal
Cavalry FC	Foothills County, Alberta (Note: ATCO Field is located within the Spruce Meadows equestrian complex, just outside the Calgary city limits.)	ATCO Field	6,000	2019	Tommy Wheeldon Jr.
Forge FC	Hamilton, Ontario	Hamilton Stadium	23,218	2019	Bobby Smyrniotis
HFX Wanderers FC	Halifax, Nova Scotia	Wanderers Grounds	7,500	2019	Vanni Sartini
Inter Toronto FC (Note: Previously known as York9 FC and York United FC.)	Toronto, Ontario	York Lions Stadium	4,000	2019	Mauro Eustáquio
Pacific FC	Langford, British Columbia (Note: Langford is located within the Greater Victoria area.)	Starlight Stadium	6,000	2019	Terry Dunfield
FC Supra du Québec	Laval, Quebec	Stade Boréale	5,581	2026	Kyt Selaidopoulos
Vancouver FC	Langley, British Columbia (Note: Langley is located within the Greater Vancouver area.)	Willoughby Stadium	6,560	2023	Martin Nash

Former clubs
Team	Location	Stadium	Capacity	Joined	Last season
FC Edmonton	Edmonton, Alberta	Clarke Stadium	5,148	2019 (Note: FC Edmonton was founded in 2010. Before participating in the Canadian Premier League, they competed in the NASL between 2011 and 2017.)	2022
Valour FC	Winnipeg, Manitoba	Princess Auto Stadium	32,343	2019	2025

=== Timeline ===
Notes

* indicates championship winning season

== Expansion ==
As CPL commissioner, David Clanachan expressed on numerous occasions the league's plans to expand gradually up to 16 clubs by 2026. He also stated that the biggest issue for potential expansion teams is lack of facilities. Clanachan mentioned that the league was looking at regions and owners in St. John's, Moncton, Laval, Quebec City, Kitchener-Waterloo, the Niagara Region, the Durham Region, Mississauga, Regina, Saskatoon, and Kelowna as well as the Fraser Valley area of British Columbia. Other areas with CPL interest include Barrie, Montreal, and Saint John.

On August 25, 2022, ARS de Quebec's Director General Philippe Bernard was quoted in Le Journal de Québec announcing that Léger Marketing had been commissioned to launch a market study to verify interest in the province for a CPL team. He also confirmed that Soccer Quebec had determined that Quebec City was the best market in the province for a new team. Although there isn't an ownership group yet, Bernard explained that the market study would help facilitate investment in a new team. In March 2025, CPL commissioner Mark Noonan and executive Vice President of Infrastructure Marni Dicker met with Quebec City mayor Bruno Marchand to discuss potential stadium sites, as the league was taking on the task of securing a stadium site rather than leaving that task to potential ownership groups.

Also in 2022, the CPL began considering a "serious expansion bid" for Kelowna that includes a multi-use development proposal for a stadium site at the city's Recreation Avenue Park. In June 2024, Kelowna hosted a neutral site regular season game as part of the CPL's "On Tour" series.

In January 2025, Kingston City Council passed a motion to work with Victory Grounds Ventures on developing a long-term lease for a multi-use stadium at the city's Memorial Centre for a proposed CPL team. Victory Grounds Ventures withdrew their proposal in March 2025, citing "potential legal issues" which were identified during the due diligence process, which "unfortunately made this project at the Memorial Centre not feasible." In September 2025, the Kingston Sentinels were announced as an Ontario Premier League expansion team for the 2026 season, owned by Victory Group Ventures. Included in the release were intentions to build a soccer-specific stadium and found a Canadian Premier League team for the 2027 season.

=== Completed ===
==== Ottawa ====
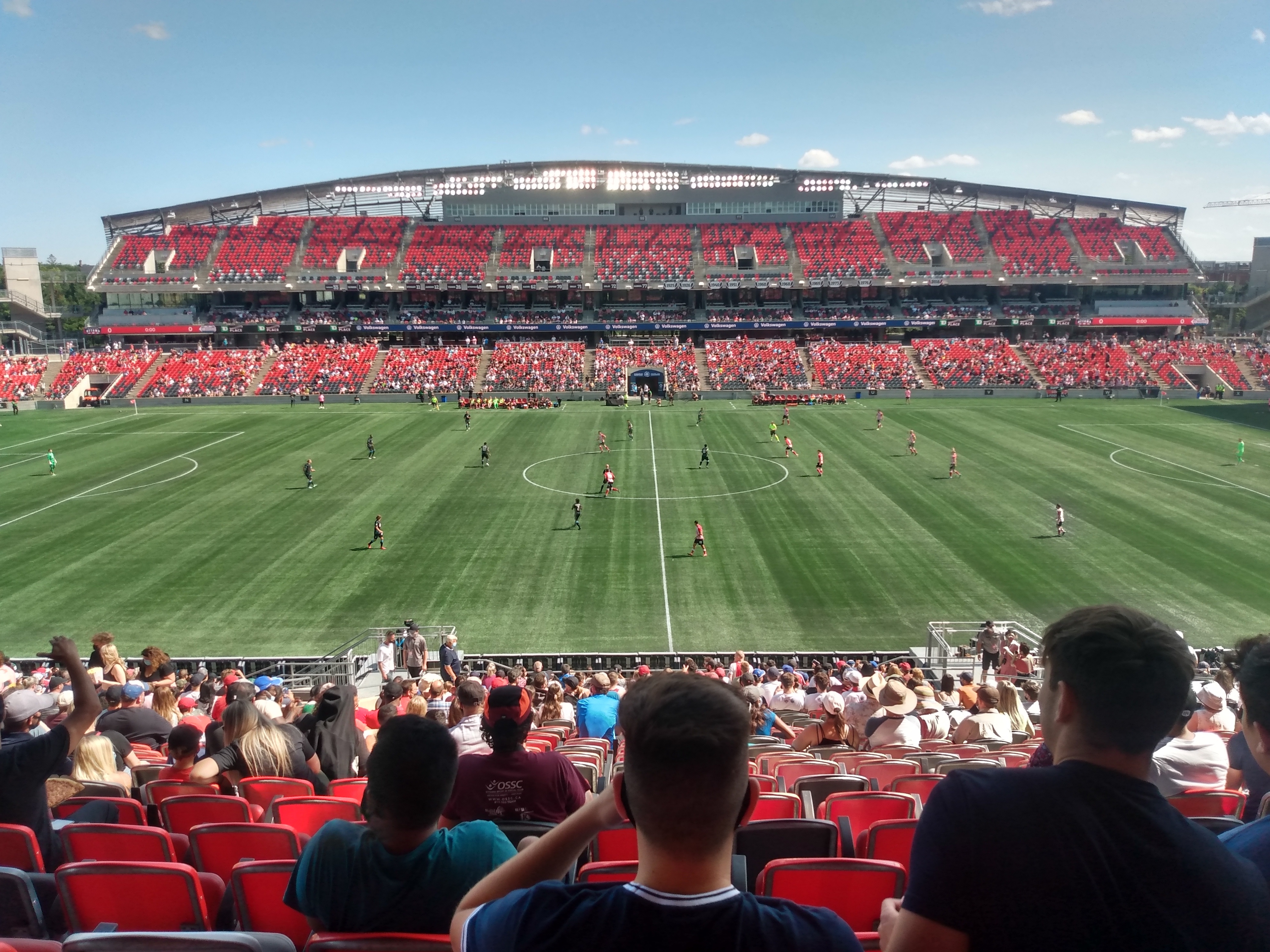
An Atlético Ottawa match. The club was the CPL's first expansion team

It had been speculated that then-existing USL Championship side Ottawa Fury FC would join the league for its 2019 or 2020 season; speculation fuelled by the Fury's acquisitions of Canadian players prior to the 2018 season. While the club remained in the USL for 2019, two of the three governing bodies of the USL (United States Soccer Federation and CONCACAF) refused to sanction the Canadian club to continue play in the US league, and the club ceased operations in November 2019.

In January 2020, there had been many reports of an Ottawa-based team owned by Atlético Madrid being formed for the 2020 season. These reports were later confirmed when the CPL announced Atlético Ottawa as the league's first expansion team on January 29, 2020.

==== Greater Vancouver ====
On November 10, 2021, the CPL awarded an expansion club in Vancouver to SixFive Sports and Entertainment LP to begin play in 2023. On April 13, 2022, the CPL and SixFive announced that the club would begin playing in Langley, British Columbia at the Willoughby Community Park adjacent to the Langley Events Centre. On November 2, 2022, the club announced its name as Vancouver FC along with a crest and team colours.

==== Greater Montreal ====
In August 2025, former CF Montréal midfielder and sporting director of CS Saint-Laurent Rocco Placentino announced his involvement in establishing a franchise based in Quebec. Placentino is being positioned as the club’s president, with Matt Rizzetta as chairman and Montreal businessman Angelo Pasto among the ownership group. The Canadian Premier League later confirmed in a statement that discussions with a group from Quebec were ongoing though no agreement had been reached yet. On September 24, 2025, the CPL Commissioner James Johnson announced that the team's name would be FC Supra du Québec and that it would be based in Laval, Quebec and begin play in 2026.

=== Pending ===
==== Windsor/Essex County ====
On January 10, 2022, the CPL announced that commissioner David Clanachan had stepped down and was awarded exclusive expansion rights for Windsor, Ontario. In June 2022, it was revealed that Clanachan had partnered with Windsor City FC owner Vancho Cirovski, setting a launch date goal of 2026. The pair had targeted Windsor Stadium as a potential home for the club. In October 2022, Windsor Mayor Drew Dilkens committed to supporting a new sports turf facility at McHugh Park to host a potential team; the city later allocated CA$3 million for turf upgrades at the park in its 2024 capital budget.

=== Cancelled ===
==== Saskatchewan ====
On March 12, 2021, the CPL conditionally awarded an expansion club to Living Sky Sports and Entertainment Inc. (LSSE), a Saskatchewan-based company. The expansion was dependent on LSSE delivering a soccer-specific stadium, and the preferred location for that stadium was Prairieland Park in Saskatoon. The team was targeting a debut of 2023 at the earliest. As of April 2021, plans called for the former horse-racing grandstand at the park to anchor the north, shorter, end of the soccer pitch, with new stands facing its other sides.

On September 5, 2023, LSSE and Prairieland Park Corporation announced that they had ended their efforts to bring a CPL team to Saskatoon, while a CPL spokesperson confirmed that LSSE's exclusivity to Saskatchewan had lapsed.

== League titles ==
Two trophies are awarded to teams at the end of a Canadian Premier League season. The North Star Cup (originally North Star Shield) is given to the playoff champion and has been awarded since the league's inception. An award for the regular season champion was announced during the 2022 CPL season; the CPL Shield was first presented in 2023, when it was also awarded retroactively for the initial four seasons of the CPL's existence. In addition to equal cash prizes, both trophy winners earn a spot in the CONCACAF Champions Cup competing against teams from across North America, Central America and Caribbean for a spot in the FIFA Club World Cup.

=== Doubles and trebles ===
As of 2025, no team had yet won a CPL double; Forge FC were CPL champions in four of the league's first seven seasons but failed to win the championship in 2021, 2024 or 2025, the only seasons to date they topped the regular season standings. In 2026, however, Cavalry FC finally achieved the Shield and Cup double, topping the regular season table and defeating Atletico Ottawa in the play-off final.

Only a single CPL team has won the Canadian Championship, with Forge FC winning the 2026 tournament against MLS side CF Montréal. Forge were also the first CPL side to reach the final, finishing runners-up in the 2020 tournament held during the COVID-19 pandemic and in which the Canadian Premier League was guaranteed a finalist, while Vancouver FC were the first Canadian Premier League team to reach the Canadian Championship final through the normal draw in 2025, losing to MLS neighbours Vancouver Whitecaps FC. Ironically, the 2026 season which saw Forge FC win their first Canadian Championship also saw them fail to win either CPL trophy for the first time. However, the Voyageurs Cup triumph maintained Forge's eight-year record of at least one championship in every season of their existence.

While a domestic treble is possible for both MLS and CPL teams, the sole Canadian treble to date was achieved by MLS-based Toronto FC in 2017 when the club won the Canadian Championship, MLS Supporters' Shield and MLS Cup.

=== CPL results by team ===
Up to 2025, Forge FC had won seven titles in the Canadian Premier League, claiming one or the other of the two awards possible each year (except 2020, where they won the only available trophy) in every season of the league's history, but never both in the same year. This streak was broken in 2026 by Cavalry winning the regular season league trophy and Forge being eliminated by Athlético Ottawa in the semi-finals. In the final, Cavalry FC prevailed 3-2 to be come the first CPL team to win the CPL 'Shield-Cup' double of regular season and play-off champions in the same year.

Team	North Star Cup (league championship)		CPL Shield (regular season)		Total titles
Team	Titles	Years	Titles	Years	Total titles
Forge FC	4	2019, 2020, 2022, 2023	3	2021, 2024, 2025	7
Cavalry FC	2	2024, **2026**	3	2019, 2023, **2026**	5
Atlético Ottawa	1	2025	1	2022	2
Pacific FC	1	2021	0		1

*bold – indicates a CPL Shield and North Star Cup double

=== CPL results by year ===
Year	Teams	North Star Cup (playoffs)	CPL Shield (regular season)	Playoff runner-up	Regular season runner-up
2019	7	Forge FC	Cavalry FC	Cavalry FC	Forge FC
2020	8	Forge FC	N/A (Note: The Canadian Premier League never declared the 2020 regular season champion; the season structure was significantly affected by the COVID-19 pandemic, and the season was different and shorter that year.)	HFX Wanderers FC	N/A
2021	8	Pacific FC	Forge FC	Forge FC	Cavalry FC
2022	8	Forge FC	Atlético Ottawa	Atlético Ottawa	Forge FC
2023	8	Forge FC	Cavalry FC	Cavalry FC	Forge FC
2024	8	Cavalry FC	Forge FC	Forge FC	Cavalry FC
2025	8	Atlético Ottawa	Forge FC	Cavalry FC	Atlético Ottawa
2026	8	**Cavalry FC**	**Cavalry FC**	Atlético Ottawa	Forge FC

*bold – indicates a CPL Shield and North Star Cup double

== Organization ==
Former logo (2018–2025)

=== Ownership ===
In April 2018, commissioner David Clanachan said that the league was looking at implementing a club-based structure for the Canadian Premier League, rather than a franchise-based system like in Major League Soccer.

=== League executives ===
On January 10, 2018, David Clanachan, former president and chief operating officer of Tim Hortons, was named as the first commissioner of the league. On January 24, he announced that Paul Beirne had been named president. Having already worked with the league for over a year, Beirne took on the role of managing the day-to-day league operations. On January 31, the Canadian Premier League named James Easton, a former Canadian international, as vice-president of Soccer Operations. On September 19, 2019, Clanachan announced that Beirne would step down as president of the CPL at the end of the 2019 season in October. On January 10, 2022, David Clanachan resigned from his position as league commissioner.

On August 25, 2022, American sports executive Mark Noonan was announced as the league's new commissioner as well as the new CEO of Canada Soccer Business (CSB) effective September 1. He served in these roles until stepping down, effective June 30, 2025. On May 22, 2025, global sports and entertainment executive James Johnson was appointed Group CEO of Canadian Soccer Business and Canadian Premier League.

=== Players ===
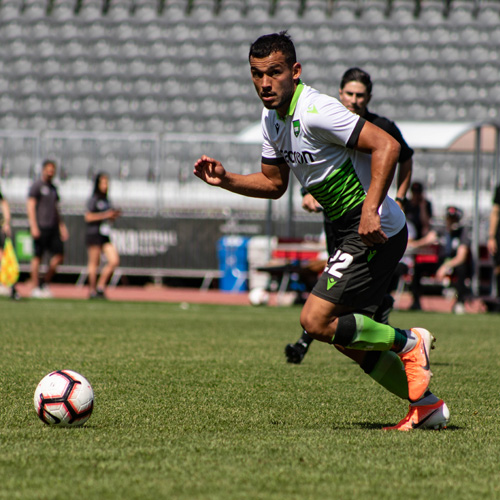
Chilean player Rodrigo Gattas playing for York9 FC

The Canadian Premier League uses a salary cap. As of the 2026 season, clubs are required to spend between CA$750,000 and $1,337,500 on player compensation, with a minimum salary of $30,000 per player. For Canadian players aged 21 and younger on standard contracts, only 50% of their salary counts towards the cap (up to $240,000 total). There is also a separate salary cap for coaches and technical staff.

The league also has several other rules to give Canadian players more opportunities. This includes a minimum of six Canadian starters per game and a limit of seven foreign nationals per team. Additionally, three of the domestic players must be under the age of 21 and play at least 2,000 combined minutes per season. Rosters are limited to a size of 23 players, although up to 10 players can be signed to a team's developmental roster. Given the limit, most teams opt to carry only two goalkeepers, however, teams may sign an emergency goalkeeper, who does not count to the roster limit, when necessary.

The CPL and U Sports hold an annual draft for university players. Drafted student-athletes are able to play for CPL teams in the spring and summer, and return to their university team by August 15, thereby preserving their eligibility. The first CPL–U Sports Draft took place in Vancouver on November 12, 2018, after the conclusion of the U Sports men's soccer championship.

The Professional Footballers Association of Canada (PFA Canada) is the union representing CPL players. Following a members vote, PFA Canada was formally recognized by the league on December 20, 2022.

=== Stadiums ===
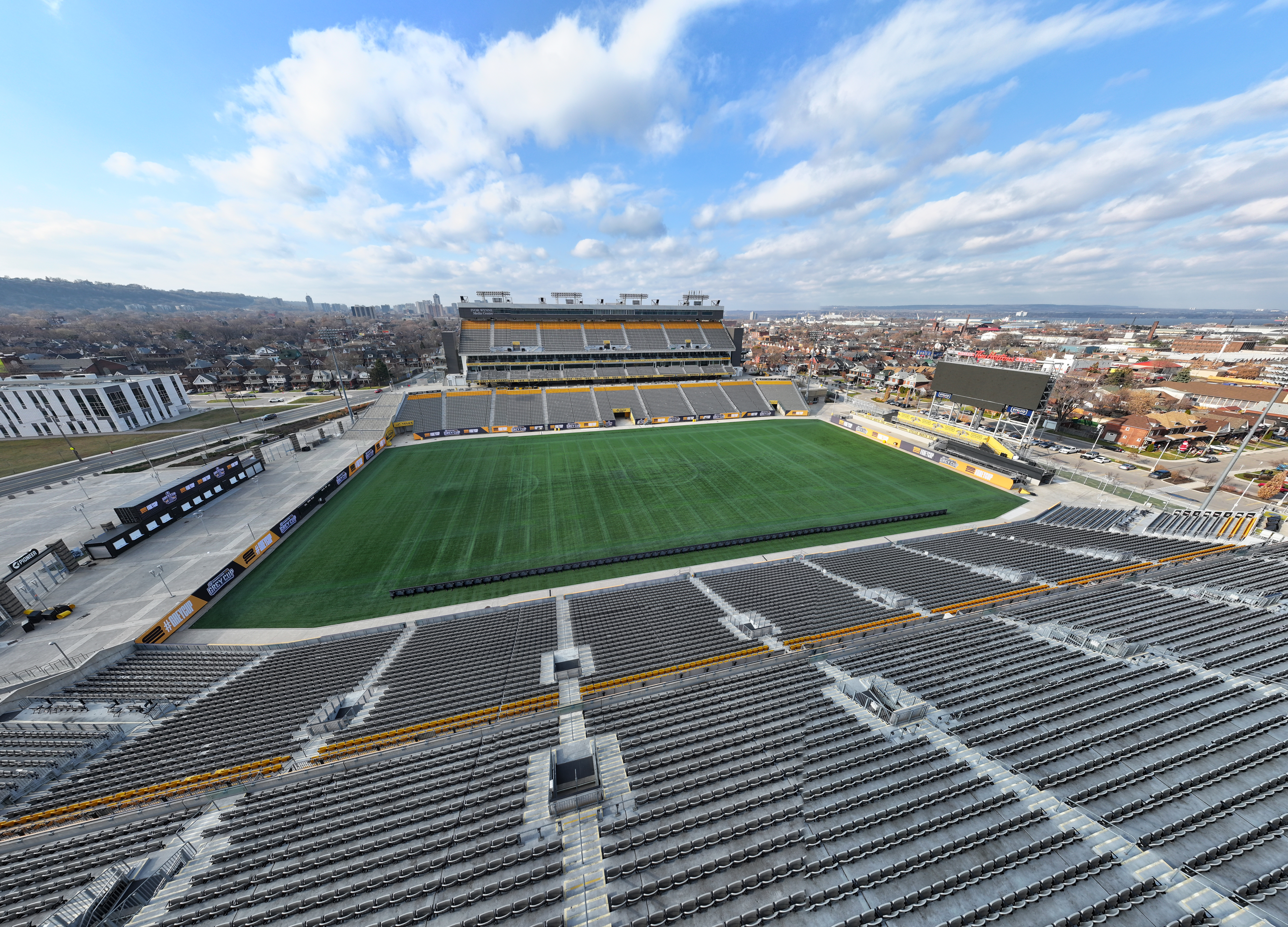
Hamilton Stadium is home to Forge FC, and is the second largest stadium in use by a CPL team.

The Canadian Premier League has used a mix of existing, built for purpose, and upgraded stadiums, many of which are shared with other teams. Princess Auto Stadium (Valour FC), TD Place Stadium (Atlético Ottawa), and Hamilton Stadium (Forge FC) were existing Canadian Football League stadiums, and have had the largest capacities in the CPL. York Lions Stadium (Inter Toronto FC) and Starlight Stadium (Pacific FC) are both pre-existing stadiums that were upgraded in capacity before the 2019 season. ATCO Field (Cavalry FC) and Wanderers Grounds (HFX Wanderers FC) were new stadiums in 2019, built at pre-existing venues.

=== Broadcast rights ===
On February 20, 2019, it was announced that Mediapro had acquired the broadcast rights to the league as part of a ten year agreement. A streaming service established in 2019, OneSoccer, carries all of the league's matches, including the Canadian Championship. Twenty games throughout the inaugural season were also available through CBC Sports, ten of which were on broadcast television, and all 20 on CBC Gem and the CBC website.

CBC extended the deal with two games every Saturday during the league's second season, while CHCH also acquired the rights for one game every Sunday. In August 2020, Fox Sports became the CPL's first broadcast partner in the United States. The season was also aired by StarTimes in Sub-Saharan Africa, 1Sports in the Indian subcontinent, and Premier Football in the Philippines. The group stage and final were broadcast in Latin America by DirecTV Go and Tigo Sports. From 2022, BT Sport started showing live coverage of the league across Ireland and the United Kingdom.

In January 2024, the broadcast agreement between the CPL and Mediapro was terminated with five years remaining in the 10-year deal due to a dispute. Despite this, Mediapro's OneSoccer continued to broadcast the CPL in 2024 under a new agreement. The 2024 final was broadcast and streamed on CBC's platforms in addition to OneSoccer. During the 2025 season, select matches were broadcast on TSN, including the 2025 final, which was played in heavy snow.

Region	Broadcaster
Canada	OneSoccer; TSN
Caribbean	Flow Sports
India; Maldives; Nepal; Sri Lanka	1Sports
Ireland; United Kingdom	BT Sport
Latin America	DirecTV Go; Tigo Sports
Mexico	Hi! Sports TV
Philippines	Premier Football
Sub-Saharan Africa	StarTimes
United States	Fox Sports

== Awards ==
At the conclusion of each season, the league presents the following awards:

- Golden Boot
- Golden Glove
- Coach of the Year
- Player of the Year
- Best U-21 Canadian Player of the Year
- Defender of the Year
- Players' Player of the Year

== See also ==
- Canadian Premier League records and statistics
- Northern Super League – women's soccer league in Canada
- Soccer in Canada
- List of soccer clubs in Canada
- Canada men's national soccer team
- List of Canadian men's soccer champions

Preceded by Canadian Soccer League (1987–1992)	Division 1 soccer league in Canada; 2019–present	Succeeded by Current
