= 2023 Pacific FC season =

Canadian soccer club's season of play

Pacific FC
2023 season
- Chairman: Dean Shillington
- Head coach: James Merriman
- Stadium: Starlight Stadium
- Canadian Premier League: 4th
- CPL playoffs: Second semi-final
- Canadian Championship: Semi-finals

The 2023 Pacific FC season was the fifth season in the history of Pacific FC. In addition to the Canadian Premier League, the club also competed in the Canadian Championship.

== Squad ==
As of September 1, 2023

| No. | Player | Nationality | Position(s) | Date of birth (age) | Previous club |
Goalkeepers
| 1 | Emil Gazdov | (Canada) | GK | September 11, 2003 (aged 20) | (Germany) FC Nürnberg |
| 12 | Kieran Baskett | (Canada) | GK | September 27, 2001 (aged 22) | (Canada) HFX Wanderers |
| | Jack Garner | (Canada) | GK | | (Canada) Van Isle Wave |
Defenders
| 2 | Georges Mukumbilwa | (Canada) | RB | September 23, 1999 (aged 24) | (Canada) Vancouver Whitecaps FC |
| 4 | Paul Amedume | (Canada) | CB / DM | February 28, 2003 (aged 20) | (United States) North Texas SC |
| 5 | Bradley Vliet | (Netherlands) | LB | March 24, 1998 (aged 25) | (Canada) Cavalry FC |
| 13 | Kunle Dada-Luke | (Canada) | FB / RW | January 12, 2000 (aged 23) | (Canada) Atlético Ottawa |
| 16 | Jalen Watson | (Canada) | CB / LB | March 23, 2000 (aged 23) | (Canada) Toronto FC II |
| 26 | Thomas Meilleur-Giguère | (Canada) | CB | November 13, 1997 (aged 26) | (Canada) Montreal Impact |
| 55 | Amer Didic | (Canada) | CB | December 28, 1994 (aged 29) | (Canada) FC Edmonton |
Midfielders
| 7 | Steffen Yeates | (Canada) | CM | January 4, 2000 (aged 23) | (Canada) Toronto FC II |
| 11 | Josh Heard | (Wales) | AM | November 29, 1994 (aged 29) | (United States) Real Monarchs |
| 20 | Sean Young | (Canada) | CM | April 20, 2001 (aged 22) | (Canada) Victoria Highlanders |
| 28 | Cédric Toussaint | (Canada) | CM / AM | March 29, 2001 (aged 22) | (Canada) York United |
| 31 | Kekuta Manneh | (The Gambia) | LW / CF | December 30, 1994 (aged 29) | (United States) San Antonio FC |
| 34 | Manny Aparicio | (Canada) | CM | September 17, 1995 (aged 28) | (Canada) York9 FC |
| | Zakaria Bahous | (Canada) | MF | August 5, 2001 (aged 22) | (Canada) Atlético Ottawa |
| | Sami Marvasti | (Canada) | CM | | (Canada) Van Isle Wave |
Forwards
| 9 | Easton Ongaro | (Canada) | ST | June 5, 1998 (aged 25) | (Canada) Whitecaps FC 2 |
| 10 | Adonijah Reid | (Canada) | CF | August 13, 1999 (aged 24) | (United States) Miami FC |
| 14 | David Brazão | (Portugal) | CF | November 1, 2001 (aged 22) | (Portugal) S.U. Sintrense |
| 19 | Abdul Binate | (Canada) | CF | January 24, 2003 (aged 20) | (Canada) CF Montréal Academy |
| 21 | Ayman Sellouf | (Netherlands) | LW / CF | August 25, 2001 (aged 22) | (Netherlands) Jong FC Utrecht |
| 23 | Djenairo Daniels | (Netherlands) | CF | January 7, 2002 (aged 21) | (Netherlands) Jong FC Utrecht |

== Transfers ==
=== In ===
| No. | Pos. | Player | From club | Fee/notes | Date | Source |
|---|---|---|---|---|---|---|
| | FW | (Canada) Easton Ongaro | (Canada) Whitecaps FC 2 | Free | November 15, 2022 | |
| | MF | (Canada) Pierre Lamothe | (Canada) HFX Wanderers | Free | November 28, 2022 | |
| | MF | (Canada) Matthew Baldisimo | (Canada) York United | Return from loan | November 30, 2022 | |
| | MF | (Haiti) Bicou Bissainthe | (Canada) FC Edmonton | Return from loan | November 30, 2022 | |
| | MF | (Canada) Simon Triantafillou | (Canada) FC Edmonton | Return from loan | November 30, 2022 | |
| | DF | (Canada) Paul Amedume | (United States) North Texas SC | Return from loan | December 2, 2022 | |
| | MF | (Canada) Steffen Yeates | (Canada) Toronto FC II | Free | December 21, 2022 | |
| | DF | (Netherlands) Bradley Vliet | (Canada) Cavalry FC | Free | January 13, 2023 | |
| | FW | (Netherlands) Ayman Sellouf | (Netherlands) Jong FC Utrecht | Free | January 25, 2023 | |
| | FW | (Canada) Adonijah Reid | (United States) Miami FC | Free | January 31, 2023 | |
| | GK | (Canada) Kieran Baskett | (Canada) HFX Wanderers | Free | March 2, 2023 | |
| | FW | (Portugal) David Brazão | (Portugal) S.U. Sintrense | Free | March 3, 2023 | |
| | FW | (The Gambia) Kekuta Manneh | (United States) San Antonio FC | Free | April 3, 2023 | |
| | DF | (Canada) Eric Lajeunesse | (Canada) UBC Thunderbirds | Selected 6th overall in the 2023 CPL–U Sports Draft | April 12, 2023 | |
| | GK | (Canada) Jack Garner | (Canada) Van Isle Wave | Signed to a development contract | April 12, 2023 | |
| | MF | (Canada) Sami Marvasti | (Canada) Van Isle Wave | Signed to a development contract | April 12, 2023 | |
| | MF | (Canada) Zakaria Bahous | (Canada) Atlético Ottawa | Free | September 1, 2023 | |

==== Loans in ====
| No. | Pos. | Player | Loaned from | Fee/notes | Date | Source |
|---|---|---|---|---|---|---|
| | DF | (Canada) Jalen Watson | (Canada) Toronto FC II | Loaned until end of season | August 31, 2023 | |

==== Draft picks ====
Pacific FC selected the following players in the 2023 CPL–U Sports Draft. Draft picks are not automatically signed to the team roster. Only those who are signed to a contract will be listed as transfers in.

| Round | Selection | Pos. | Player | Nationality | University |
|---|---|---|---|---|---|
| 1 | 6 | DF | Eric LaJeunesse | Canada | UBC |
| 2 | 13 | DF | Brandon Torresan | Canada | Trinity Western |

=== Out ===
| No. | Pos. | Player | To club | Fee/notes | Date | Source |
|---|---|---|---|---|---|---|
| 3 | DF | (Canada) Jordan Haynes | (Canada) Valour FC | Contract expired | November 2, 2022 | |
| 6 | MF | (Portugal) Umaro Baldé | | Contract expired | November 2, 2022 | |
| 8 | MF | (Canada) Matteo Polisi | (Canada) TSS FC Rovers | Contract expired | November 2, 2022 | |
| 33 | DF | (England) Nathan Mavila | (Jordan) Al-Faisaly | Contract expired | November 7, 2022 | |
| 14 | MF | (Canada) Luca Ricci | | Contract expired | November 7, 2022 | |
| 22 | MF | (Canada) Jamar Dixon | Retired | | November 8, 2022 | |
| 30 | FW | (Canada) Kamron Habibullah | (Canada) Vancouver Whitecaps | End of loan | November 30, 2022 | |
| 1 | GK | (Canada) Callum Irving | (Canada) Vancouver FC | Contract expired | December 8, 2022 | |
| 5 | DF | (Mali) Abdou Samake | (Canada) Valour FC | Contract expired | December 9, 2022 | |
| 33 | MF | (Canada) Matthew Baldisimo | (Canada) York United | Contract expired | December 15, 2022 | |
| 24 | FW | (Cape Verde) Gianni dos Santos | (Canada) Atlético Ottawa | Contract expired | December 28, 2022 | |
| | MF | (Haiti) Bicou Bissainthe | (Vietnam) Haiphong FC | Contract expired | December 31, 2022 | |
| | MF | (Canada) Simon Triantafillou | | Contract expired | December 31, 2022 | |
| 10 | MF | (Canada) Marco Bustos | (Sweden) IFK Värnamo | Contract expired | January 4, 2023 | |
| 15 | FW | (England) Jordan Brown | | Contract terminated by mutual consent | January 6, 2023 | |

==== Loans out ====
| No. | Pos. | Player | Loaned to | Fee/notes | Date | Source |
|---|---|---|---|---|---|---|
| 8 | MF | (Canada) Pierre Lamothe | (Vietnam) Ho Chi Minh City | Loaned until March 10, 2024 | September 1, 2023 | |

== Competitions ==
=== Overview ===
| Competition | Starting round | Final position | Record | | | | | | | |
| Competition | Starting round | Final position | Pld | W | D | L | GF | GA | GD | Win % |
|---|---|---|---|---|---|---|---|---|---|---|
| Canadian Premier League | Matchday 1 | 4th | 28 | 11 | 7 | 10 | 42 | 35 | +7 | 39.29 |
| CPL Playoffs | Play-in round | Second semifinal | 3 | 2 | 0 | 1 | 3 | 2 | +1 | 66.67 |
| Canadian Championship | Preliminary round | Semi-finals | 3 | 1 | 1 | 1 | 3 | 4 | −1 | 33.33 |
| Total | | | 34 | 14 | 8 | 12 | 48 | 41 | +7 | 41.18 |

Last updated: 21 October 2023
Source: Competitions

=== Pre-season friendlies ===
| March 7, 2023 Friendly | University of Victoria Vikes | 0–3 | Pacific FC | Victoria, British Columbia |
| 7:00pm | | Report | Aparicio; Heard (pen.); Toussaint | Stadium: Centennial Stadium, University of Victoria |

| March 17, 2023 Friendly | Pacific FC | 3–0 | Whitecaps FC 2 | Langford, British Columbia |
| | Meilleur-Giguère; Ongaro; Young | Report | | Stadium: Starlight Stadium; Attendance: 0 Referee: Joey Ratcliffe |

| March 22, 2023 Friendly | Pacific FC | – | Valour FC |
| | | | | Referee: Alain Ruch |

| April 1, 2023 Friendly | Pacific FC | – | University of Washington Huskies | Langford, British Columbia |
| | | | | Stadium: Starlight Stadium |

=== Canadian Premier League ===
==== Standings ====
| Pos | Team | Pld | W | D | L | GF | GA | GD | Pts | Playoff qualification |
|---|---|---|---|---|---|---|---|---|---|---|
| 1 | Cavalry (S) | 28 | 16 | 7 | 5 | 46 | 27 | +19 | 55 | First semifinal |
| 2 | Forge (C) | 28 | 11 | 9 | 8 | 39 | 32 | +7 | 42 (Note: Tie resolved by away goal differential; Forge: +4, Wanderers: −2) | First semifinal |
| 3 | HFX Wanderers | 28 | 11 | 9 | 8 | 39 | 32 | +7 | 42 | Quarterfinal |
| 4 | Pacific | 28 | 11 | 7 | 10 | 42 | 35 | +7 | 40 | Play-in round |
| 5 | York United | 28 | 11 | 5 | 12 | 35 | 44 | −9 | 38 | Play-in round |
| 6 | Atlético Ottawa | 28 | 10 | 6 | 12 | 38 | 34 | +4 | 36 | |
| 7 | Vancouver | 28 | 8 | 5 | 15 | 28 | 50 | −22 | 29 | |
| 8 | Valour | 28 | 6 | 8 | 14 | 25 | 38 | −13 | 26 | |

Source: CanPL
Rules for classification: 1) Points; 2) Total wins; 3) Goal difference; 4) Goals scored; 5) Away goal differential; 6) Away goals scored; 7) Home goal differential; 8) Home goals scored; 9) Total minutes played by U-21 players; 10) Coin toss (2 teams tied) or drawing of lots (3+ teams tied).
(C) Champion (qualified to Champions Cup); (S) CPL Shield winner (qualified to Champions Cup)

==== Results by match ====
| Match | 1 | 2 | 3 | 4 | 5 | 6 | 7 | 8 | 9 | 10 | 11 | 12 | 13 | 14 | 15 | 16 | 17 | 18 | 19 | 20 | 21 | 22 | 23 | 24 | 25 | 26 | 27 | 28 |
|---|---|---|---|---|---|---|---|---|---|---|---|---|---|---|---|---|---|---|---|---|---|---|---|---|---|---|---|---|
| Result | W | D | L | W | W | D | D | W | W | W | W | D | L | L | D | L | W | W | L | L | L | W | D | D | W | L | L | L |
| Position | 2 | 2 | 4 | 2 | 2 | 2 | 2 | 2 | 2 | 1 | 1 | 1 | 1 | 1 | 1 | 2 | 1 | 1 | 1 | 2 | 2 | 2 | 2 | 2 | 2 | 3 | 3 | 4 |

Source: Matches
W = Win; D = Draw; L = Loss

==== Matches ====
| April 15 1 | Pacific FC | 1–0 | Vancouver FC | Langford, British Columbia |
| 4:00pm PT | Aparicio 81' | Report | Chung (yellow card) 45+2'; Kwak (yellow card) 72' | Stadium: Starlight Stadium; Attendance: 4,825 |

| April 23 2 | Pacific FC | 1–1 | Cavalry FC | Langford, British Columbia |
| 1:00pm PT | Toussaint (yellow card) 19'; Young (yellow card) 28'; Sellouf 42' | Report | Gazdov 9' (o.g.); Daley (yellow card) 35'; Ntignee (yellow card) 40'; Aird (yellow card) 90+5' | Stadium: Starlight Stadium; Attendance: 2,455 |

| April 30 3 | Pacific FC | 0–1 | Forge FC | Langford, British Columbia |
| 5:00pm PT | Young (yellow card) 68' | Report | Pacius 17', (yellow card) 57'; Henry (yellow card) 88' | Stadium: Starlight Stadium; Attendance: 3,378; Referee: Renzo Villanueva |

| May 6 4 | Atlético Ottawa | 1–4 | Pacific FC | Ottawa, Ontario |
| 7:00pm ET | Shaw (yellow card) 44'; Bassett 52'; Assi (yellow card) 54'; Sacko (yellow card) 75'; dos Santos (yellow card) 90+3' | Report | Young 6'; Heard 9'; Sellouf 34'; Didic 69' | Stadium: TD Place Stadium; Attendance: 3,499; Referee: Fabrizio Stasolla |

| May 14 5 | Pacific FC | 4–1 | York United FC | Langford, British Columbia |
| 3:00pm PT | Didic 7'; Aparicio 42'; Mukumbilwa (yellow card) 61'; Brazão 82'; Ongaro 90+2' | Report | dos Santos 55'; Faye (yellow card) 60' | Stadium: Starlight Stadium; Attendance: 3,027; Referee: Scott Bowman |

| May 20 6 | Valour FC | 1–1 | Pacific FC | Winnipeg, Manitoba |
| 4:00pm CT | Gutiérrez (yellow card) 66'; Niyongabire (yellow card) 69' | Report | Young 49', (yellow card) 72'; Yeates (yellow card) 73'; Toussaint (yellow card) 90+1'; Amedume (yellow card) 90+3' | Stadium: IG Field; Attendance: 2,775 |

| May 27 7 | Pacific FC | 1–1 | HFX Wanderers FC | Langford, British Columbia |
| 7:00pm PT | Reid 32'; Vliet (yellow card) 64' | Report | Daniels 84' | Stadium: Starlight Stadium; Attendance: 2,741; Referee: Alain Ruch |

| June 2 8 | Vancouver FC | 3–6 | Pacific FC | Langley Township, British Columbia |
| 7:00pm PT | Kwak 7'; Bakare (yellow card) 9'; Tahid 45+1', (yellow card) 52'; Hundal 87' (pen.) | Report | Didic 3', (yellow card) 86'; Aparicio (yellow card) 19', (goal) 80' (pen.); Heard 24'; Sellouf 66'; Ongaro 68'; Reid (yellow card) 68'; Manneh 90+1' | Stadium: Willoughby Community Park; Attendance: 3,438; Referee: Renzo Villanueva |

| June 10 9 | Forge FC | 0–1 | Pacific FC | Hamilton, Ontario |
| 7:00pm ET | James (yellow card) 33' | Report | Reid (yellow card) 29'; Daniels 85' | Stadium: Tim Hortons Field; Attendance: 5,013; Referee: Yusri Rudolf |

| June 18 10 | Pacific FC | 1–0 | York United FC | Langford, British Columbia |
| 1:00pm PT | Toussaint (yellow card) 50'; Meilleur-Giguère (yellow card) 54'; Aparicio (yellow card) 56'; Daniels (yellow card) 81'; Young 88' | Report | Soumaoro (yellow card) 40'; Babouli (yellow card) 45+1'; Ricci (yellow card) 56'; Gee (yellow card) 73' | Stadium: Starlight Stadium; Attendance: 2,741; Referee: Mario Alayass |

| June 21 11 | Pacific FC | 1–0 | Valour FC | Langford, British Columbia |
| 7:00pm PT | Mukumbilwa (yellow card) 30'; Toussaint (yellow card) 77'; Ongaro 79'; Didić (yellow card) 90+5' | Report | Campbell (yellow card) 58' | Stadium: Starlight Stadium; Attendance: 2,706 |

| June 30 12 | Pacific FC | 2–2 | Atlético Ottawa | Langford, British Columbia |
| 6:30pm PT | Meilleur-Giguère 45+5'; Sellouf 49'; Yeates (yellow card) 64'; Daniels (yellow card) 89' | Report | Salter 19'; Bassett 53' (pen.); Niba (yellow card) 56'; Espejo (red card) 84'; Ingham (yellow card) 90+2'; Assi (yellow card) 90+3' | Stadium: Starlight Stadium; Attendance: 2,591; Referee: Alain Ruch |

| July 8 13 | Pacific FC | 1–2 | Cavalry FC | Langford, British Columbia |
| 6:00pm PT | Meilleur-Giguère (yellow card) 22'; Heard (yellow card) 51'; Ongaro 72'; Young (yellow card) 75' | Report | Camargo (yellow card) 20'; Kobza 36'; Aird 44'; Daley (yellow card) 49'; Kamdem (yellow card) 51'; Ntignee (yellow card) 62'; Chima (yellow card) 75' | Stadium: Starlight Stadium; Attendance: 2,825 |

| July 11 14 | HFX Wanderers FC | 2–1 | Pacific FC | Halifax, Nova Scotia |
| 8:00pm AT | Ferrin 16'; Watson 49'; Fernandez (yellow card) 56'; Fillion (yellow card) 79'; Nimick (yellow card) 90+2' | Report | Young (yellow card) 56' (yellow-red card) 56'; Kunle Dada-Luke (yellow card) 59'; Đidić 87'; Lamothe (yellow card) 90+4' | Stadium: Wanderers Grounds; Attendance: 5,255; Referee: David Barrie |
Note: Game originally scheduled for 7:00pm, postponed one hour due to excessive rain and flooding.

| July 14 15 | York United FC | 0–0 | Pacific FC | Toronto, Ontario |
| 7:30pm ET | Gee (yellow card) 33'; Mourdoukoutas (yellow card) 49'; Ferrari (yellow card) 90' | Report | Toussaint (yellow card) 60'; Daniels (yellow card) 66'; Lajeunesse (yellow card) 74' | Stadium: York Lions Stadium; Attendance: 1,464; Referee: Carly Shaw-MacLaren |

| July 21 16 | Pacific FC | 0–2 | Forge FC | Langford, British Columbia |
| 7:00pm PT | Toussaint (yellow card) 45'; Heard (yellow card) 71' | Report | Kwasi Poku 6'; Choinière 38'; Metusala (yellow card) 75' | Stadium: Starlight Stadium; Attendance: 3,311; Referee: Michael Venne |

| July 29 17 | Valour FC | 0–3 | Pacific FC | Winnipeg, Manitoba |
| 3:00pm CT | Williams (yellow card) 90+1' | Report | Reid 5'; Heard 83'; Sellouf 85' | Stadium: Princess Auto Stadium; Attendance: 2,977 |

| August 7 18 | HFX Wanderers FC | 1–2 | Pacific FC | Halifax, Nova Scotia |
| 3:00pm AT | Loughrey (yellow card) 22'; Ferrin (yellow card) 44'; Morelli (yellow card) 46'; Nimick 79' | Report | Heard (yellow card) 25'; Meilleur-Giguère 45+2'; Heard 54'; Toussaint (yellow card) 83'; Yeates (yellow card) 90+8' | Stadium: Wanderers Grounds; Attendance: 6,254; Referee: Yusri Rudolf |

| August 13 19 | Pacific FC | 0–1 | Atlético Ottawa | Langford, British Columbia |
| 1:30pm PT | Heard (yellow card) 69'; Gazdov (yellow card) 90+8' | Report | Del Campo (yellow card) 33'; Bassett 38'; Ingham (yellow card) 62'; Salter (yellow card) 90+8' | Stadium: Starlight Stadium; Attendance: 3,356; Referee: Scott Bowman |

| August 19 20 | Vancouver FC | 3–2 | Pacific FC | Langley Township, British Columbia |
| 1:00pm PT | Cantave 11'; E. Simmons (yellow card) 44'; Fry (yellow card) 52'; Bitar 76', 87' | Report | Mukumbilwa (yellow card) 33'; Didić (yellow card) 41'; Meilleur-Giguère 65'; Daniels 73' | Stadium: Willoughby Community Park; Attendance: 2,363; Referee: Yusri Rudolf |

| August 27 21 | Cavalry FC | 1–0 | Pacific FC | Foothills County, Alberta |
| 3:00pm MT | Bevan 52' (pen.) | Report | Didić (yellow card) 18'; Daniels (yellow card) 42'; Aparicio (yellow card) 56'; Mukumbilwa (yellow card) 89' (yellow-red card) 90+1' | Stadium: ATCO Field; Attendance: 4,617 |

| September 2 22 | Pacific FC | 2–1 | Valour FC | Langford, British Columbia |
| 1:00pm PT | Reid 35'; Vliet (yellow card) 83'; Sellouf 85' | Report | Polisi (yellow card) 24'; Pianelli (yellow card) 66'; de Brienne 77'; Campbell (yellow card) 79'; Baquero (yellow card) 90+2'; Selemani (yellow card) 90+4' | Stadium: Starlight Stadium; Attendance: 3,286 |

| September 8 23 | Pacific FC | 1–1 | HFX Wanderers FC | Langford, British Columbia |
| 7:00pm PT | Toussaint (yellow card) 45+1'; Didic (yellow card) 50'; Sellouf 57' (pen.); Amedume (yellow card) 85' | Report | Wilson 45+1'; Armaan Wilson (yellow card) 58'; Mwandwe (yellow card) 69' | Stadium: Starlight Stadium; Attendance: 3,153; Referee: Alain Ruch |

| September 13 24 | Atlético Ottawa | 1–1 | Pacific FC | Ottawa, Ontario |
| 5:30pm ET | Ouimette (yellow card) 59'; Tissot 65'; Zapater (yellow card) 90+1' | Report | Yeates 29'; Dada-Luke (yellow card) 52'; Bahous (yellow card) 74'; Daniels (yellow card) 79' | Stadium: TD Place Stadium; Attendance: 4,236; Referee: Scott Bowman |

| September 17 25 | York United FC | 1–4 | Pacific FC | Toronto, Ontario |
| 5:00pm ET | Esprit (yellow card) 34'; Ricci (yellow card) 63'; Gagnon-Laparé (yellow card) 75'; De Rosario 86' | Report | Meilleur-Giguère 11'; Young 18'; Aparicio (yellow card) 40' (goal) 62'; Brazão 79'; Ongaro (yellow card) 90+3' | Stadium: York Lions Stadium; Attendance: 1,151; Referee: Myriam Marcotte |

| September 23 26 | Forge FC | 3–1 | Pacific FC | Hamilton, Ontario |
| 7:00pm ET | Rama 5'; Hojabrpour (yellow card) 14'; Pacius 44'; Sissoko (yellow card) 45+10'; Hamilton 90+6' | Report | Daniels 3'; Heard (yellow card) 76' | Stadium: Tim Hortons Field; Attendance: 5,327; Referee: Yusri Rudolf |

| September 30 27 | Pacific FC | 1–2 | Vancouver FC | Langford, British Columbia |
| 2:00pm PT | Vliet (yellow card) 26'; Daniels (yellow card) 38'; Ongaro 53'; Manneh (yellow card) 65' | Report | Bitar 28'; Cantave (yellow card) 34'; Fry 35'; E. Simmons (yellow card) 54' | Stadium: Starlight Stadium; Attendance: 4,404; Referee: Ben Hoskins |

| October 7 28 | Cavalry FC | 3–0 | Pacific FC | Foothills County, Alberta |
| 1:00pm MT | Klomp 22'; Bevan 74'; Aird (yellow card) 90'; Trafford (yellow card) 90+2'; Henry 90+4' | Report | Aparicio (yellow card) 78' | Stadium: ATCO Field; Attendance: 4,656 |

==== Playoff matches ====
| October 11 Play-in round | Pacific FC | 1–0 | York United FC | Langford, British Columbia |
| 7::00pm PT | Young (yellow card) 40'; Reid 90+1'; Ongaro (yellow card) 90+4' | Report | Ferrari (yellow card) 67'; Martin-Pereux (yellow card) 88' | Stadium: Starlight Stadium; Attendance: 2,780; Referee: Ben Hoskins |

| October 14 Quarterfinal | HFX Wanderers FC | 0–1 | Pacific FC | Halifax, Nova Scotia |
| 3:00pm AT | Callegari (yellow card) 49'; Henry (yellow card) 90+7' | Report | Fernandez 37' (o.g.); Ongaro (yellow card) 50'; Dada-Luke (yellow card) 80'; Toussaint (yellow card) 90+8' | Stadium: Wanderers Grounds; Attendance: 6,254; Referee: Yusri Rudolf |

| October 21 Second semifinal | Cavalry FC | 2–1 | Pacific FC | Foothills County, Alberta |
| 2:00pm MT | Daley (yellow card) 5'; Klomp 27'; Trafford (yellow card) 39'; Musse 62'; Fisk (yellow card) 90+2' | Report | Heard (yellow card) 43'; Young (yellow card) 51'; Manneh 66'; Toussaint (yellow card) 86' | Stadium: ATCO Field; Attendance: 4,066 |

=== Canadian Championship ===
| April 20 Preliminary round | Pacific FC | 1–1 (5–3 p) | Cavalry FC | Langford, British Columbia |
| 7:00 pm | Ongaro 39'; Daniels (yellow card) 45+2' | Report | Escalanté (yellow card) 15'; Bevan 28', (yellow card) 45+2' | Stadium: Starlight Stadium; Attendance: 2,099; Referee: David Barrie |
| | Penalties |
| | Heard (penalty scored); Sellouf (penalty scored); Đidić (penalty scored); Young (penalty scored); Mukumbilwa (penalty scored) | | (penalty scored) Aird; (penalty scored) Cantave; (penalty scored) Alarcón; (penalty missed) Klomp |

| May 10 Quarter-finals | Pacific FC | 2–0 | TSS FC Rovers | Langford, British Columbia |
| 7:30 pm | Heard 66' (pen.); Young (yellow card) 81'; Reid 87' | Report | | Stadium: Starlight Stadium; Attendance: 2,593; Referee: Myriam Marcotte |

| May 24 Semi-finals | Pacific FC | 0–3 | Vancouver Whitecaps FC | Langford, British Columbia |
| 7:00 pm | Aparicio (yellow card) 47' | Report | Gressel 14'; Ahmed 17'; Córdova (yellow card) 56'; Blackmon (yellow card) 75'; Becher 78' | Stadium: Starlight Stadium; Attendance: 5,221; Referee: Drew Fischer |
