= 2023 Canadian Championship =

Soccer tournament featuring professional teams

Championnat canadien 2023 (French)

Tournament details
- Country: Canada
- Date: April 18 – June 7
- Teams: 14 (from 5 leagues)

Final positions
- Champions: Vancouver Whitecaps FC (3rd title)
- Runners-up: CF Montréal

Tournament statistics
- Matches played: 13
- Goals scored: 35 (2.69 per match)
- Attendance: 79,875 (6,144 per match)
- Top goal scorer(s): Sunusi Ibrahim (3 goals)

Awards
- George Gross Memorial Trophy: Julian Gressel
- Best young player: Ali Ahmed

The 2023 Canadian Championship (French: Championnat canadien 2023) was the sixteenth edition of the Canadian Championship, the premier men's domestic cup competition in Canadian soccer, and the 22nd competition staged to determine the winner of the Voyageurs Cup. It was a knockout tournament with all eleven professional men's soccer teams in Canada, from Major League Soccer and the Canadian Premier League, competing, along with the champions of the three semi-professional League1 Canada competitions. The tournament marked the first Voyageurs Cup campaign for FC Laval, TSS FC Rovers and Vancouver FC.

This tournament was notable for the TSS FC Rovers' performance, as they made the quarter-finals in their debut appearance by upsetting Valour FC in the first round. In doing so, they became the first non-professional team in the history of the competition to advance past a fully professional opponent.

== Format ==
The winner of the 2022 Canadian Championship, Vancouver Whitecaps FC, and runner-up Toronto FC, both received byes to the quarter-finals. The remaining 12 teams began the competition from the first round in April. Qualification to the Canadian Championship for 2023 was automatic for Canadian teams within Major League Soccer and for all teams within the Canadian Premier League, Canada's tier-one national league. The 2022 champions from the three regional pro-am leagues of League1 Canada (League1 Ontario, PLSQ, and League1 British Columbia) also qualified.

The 2023 Canadian Championship determined a place in the continental 2024 CONCACAF Champions Cup tournament. If the winner had already qualified for the Champions Cup via berths in the 2023 Major League Soccer, 2023 Leagues Cup or 2023 Canadian Premier League, the place would have gone to the runners-up in the final, and then to the "higher-ranked" semi-finalist based on league points totals, if the runners-up had also already qualified.

Matches in the 2023 tournament were each played as a single 90-minute match with additional time. If a match ended in a draw, no extra time was played, and the match went straight to a penalty shoot-out to decide the winner. Each team competing in the tournament could select up to 30 players to their tournament roster. If a player already nominated to a team's tournament roster was transferred to a competing team during the tournament, they were disqualified from further play in the tournament. For each match, teams could select up to 18 players for a match roster, while their starting lineup had to include at least three Canadian players. Both teams could make up to five substitutions and two concussion substitutions throughout the match at up to three stoppages of play, excluding half-time.

== Teams ==
2023 Canadian Championship (Canada)
Locations of teams competing in the 2023 Canadian Championship

League	Team	Location	Entry round	App.	Previous best performance
Major League Soccer	Toronto FC	Toronto, ON	Quarter-finals as 2022 finalist	16th	Winners (8 times; 2009, 2010, 2011, 2012, 2016, 2017, 2018, 2020)
Major League Soccer	Vancouver Whitecaps FC	Vancouver, BC	Quarter-finals as 2022 finalist	15th	Winners (2 times; 2015, 2022)
Major League Soccer	CF Montréal	Montreal, QC	Preliminary round	15th	Winners (4 times; 2013, 2014, 2019, 2021)
Canadian Premier League	Atlético Ottawa	Ottawa, ON	Preliminary round	3rd	Preliminary round (2 times; 2021, 2022)
Canadian Premier League	Cavalry FC	Foothills, AB	Preliminary round	4th	Semi-finals (2019)
Canadian Premier League	Forge FC	Hamilton, ON	Preliminary round	5th	Runners-up (2020)
Canadian Premier League	HFX Wanderers FC	Halifax, NS	Preliminary round	4th	Quarter-finals (3 times; 2019, 2021, 2022)
Canadian Premier League	Pacific FC	Langford, BC	Preliminary round	4th	Semi-finals (2021)
Canadian Premier League	Valour FC	Winnipeg, MB	Preliminary round	4th	Quarter-finals (2021)
Canadian Premier League	Vancouver FC	Langley, BC	Preliminary round	1st	—
Canadian Premier League	York United FC	Toronto, ON	Preliminary round	4th	Semi-finals (2022)
League1 Canada (division champions)	FC Laval (PLSQ)	Laval, QC	Preliminary round	1st	—
League1 Canada (division champions)	TSS FC Rovers (L1BC)	Burnaby, BC	Preliminary round	1st	—
League1 Canada (division champions)	Vaughan Azzurri (L1O)	Vaughan, ON	Preliminary round	2nd	First qualifying round (2019)

== Schedule ==
Round	Match dates
Preliminary round	April 18–20
Quarter-finals	May 9–10
Semi-finals	May 24
Final	June 7

== Draw ==
On January 17, 2023, Canada Soccer announced that the draw for the championship would be held on January 31 at 8:00 pm EST. The draw details and pots were announced on January 24. Due to the early start of the tournament, only 5 of 12 teams were able to host to host a match in the first round. Teams were assigned into pots based on geography (east or west) and hosting ability.

Prior to the commencement of the draw, one club from Pot B1 was moved into Pot A1, then one club from Pot B2 was moved to B1, and then both clubs from Pot C were moved to Pot B2, resulting in an even distribution of three teams in each of the first round pots. Atlético Ottawa and HFX Wanderers FC were placed in Pot B2 prior to the draw as the eastern teams that did not commit to hosting a match in the first round. The Wanderers were eventually drawn from Pot A1 as the designated home team for their first round match against Ottawa, and Canada Soccer determined a neutral venue for the match.

Pot A1	Pot A2	Pot B1	Pot B2	Pot C	Pot D
Pacific FC; TSS FC Rovers	Cavalry FC; Valour FC; Vancouver FC	Forge FC; York United FC; CF Montréal	Atlético Ottawa; HFX Wanderers FC	FC Laval; Vaughan Azzurri	Toronto FC; Vancouver Whitecaps FC

Final positions

West (home)	West (away)	East (home)	East (away)	Byes
Pacific FC; TSS FC Rovers; York United FC	Cavalry FC; Valour FC; Vancouver FC	Forge FC; CF Montréal; HFX Wanderers FC†	Atlético Ottawa; FC Laval; Vaughan Azzurri	Toronto FC; Vancouver Whitecaps FC

†: Could not host a preliminary round match.

== Bracket ==
Preliminary round April 18–20
Langford, BC
CPL	Pacific FC (p)	1 (5)
CPL	Cavalry FC	1 (3)
Burnaby, BC
L1BC	TSS FC Rovers	3
CPL	Valour FC	1
Toronto (York Lions), ON
CPL	York United FC	1
CPL	Vancouver FC	0
Montreal, QC
MLS	CF Montréal	2
L1O	Vaughan Azzurri	0
Hamilton, ON
CPL	Forge FC	3
PLSQ	FC Laval	0
Toronto (York Lions), ON
CPL	HFX Wanderers FC	1
CPL	Atlético Ottawa	3

Quarter-finals; May 9–10
Langford, BC
CPL	Pacific FC	2
L1BC	TSS FC Rovers	0
Toronto (York Lions), ON
CPL	York United FC	1
MLS	Vancouver Whitecaps FC	4
Toronto (BMO), ON
MLS	Toronto FC	1
MLS	CF Montréal	2
Hamilton, ON
CPL	Forge FC (p)	1 (3)
CPL	Atlético Ottawa	1 (2)

Semi-finals; May 24
Langford, BC
CPL	Pacific FC	0
MLS	Vancouver Whitecaps FC	3
Montreal, QC
MLS	CF Montréal	2
CPL	Forge FC	0

Final; June 7
Vancouver, BC
MLS	Vancouver Whitecaps FC	2
MLS	CF Montréal	1

== Preliminary round ==
=== Summary ===
Team 1	Score	Team 2
TSS FC Rovers	3–1	Valour FC
Pacific FC	1–1 (5–3 p)	Cavalry FC
York United FC	1–0	Vancouver FC
Forge FC	3–0	FC Laval
HFX Wanderers FC	1–3 (Note: This match was played at York Lions Stadium (a neutral venue) due to both clubs being unable to host the match.)	Atlético Ottawa
CF Montréal	2–0	Vaughan Azzurri

=== Matches ===
April 19
7:30 pm PDT

TSS FC Rovers	3–1	Valour FC
Polisi 39', 62'; Mejia 42'	Report	Novak 88' (pen.)

Swangard Stadium, Burnaby, British Columbia
Attendance: 2,486
Referee: Robert D'Alesio

April 20
7:00 pm PDT

Pacific FC	1–1	Cavalry FC
Ongaro 39'	Report	Bevan 28'
Penalties
Heard (penalty scored); Sellouf (penalty scored); Đidić (penalty scored); Young (penalty scored); Mukumbilwa (penalty scored)	5–3	(penalty scored) Aird; (penalty scored) Cantave; (penalty scored) Alarcón; (penalty missed) Klomp

Starlight Stadium, Langford, British Columbia
Attendance: 2,099
Referee: David Barrie

April 19
8:00 pm EDT

York United FC	1–0	Vancouver FC
Babouli 6' (pen.)	Report

York Lions Stadium, Toronto, Ontario
Attendance: 950
Referee: Michael Venne

April 18
7:00 pm EDT

Forge FC	3–0	FC Laval
Jensen 37', 55'; Pacius 57' (pen.)	Report

Tim Hortons Field, Hamilton, Ontario
Attendance: 2,117
Referee: Scott Bowman

April 19
5:00 pm EDT

HFX Wanderers FC	1–3	Atlético Ottawa
Ferrin 19'	Report	Shaw 40'; Espejo 44'; Tissot 85'

York Lions Stadium, Toronto, Ontario
Attendance: 674
Referee: Myriam Marcotte

April 18
7:00 pm EDT

CF Montréal	2–0	Vaughan Azzurri
Rea 31'; Ibrahim 36'	Report

Saputo Stadium, Montreal, Quebec
Attendance: 11,069
Referee: Mathieu Souaré

== Quarter-finals ==
=== Summary ===
Team 1	Score	Team 2
Pacific FC	2–0	TSS FC Rovers
York United FC	1–4	Vancouver Whitecaps FC
Forge FC	1–1 (3–2 p) (Note: Although Atlético Ottawa was drawn as the home team, this match was played at Tim Hortons Field due to Atlético opting out of hosting.)	Atlético Ottawa
Toronto FC	1–2	CF Montréal

=== Matches ===
May 10
7:30 pm PDT

Pacific FC	2–0	TSS FC Rovers
Heard 66' (pen.); Reid 87'	Report

Starlight Stadium, Langford, British Columbia
Attendance: 2,593
Referee: Myriam Marcotte

May 10
7:30 pm EDT

York United FC	1–4	Vancouver Whitecaps FC
Ricci 90'	Report	Adekugbe 64' (o.g.); Becher 76'; Johnson 88'; Gressel 90+1' (pen.)

York Lions Stadium, Toronto, Ontario
Attendance: 1,827
Referee: Drew Fischer

May 9
7:00 pm EDT

Forge FC	1–1	Atlético Ottawa
Bekker 76'	Report	Bassett 87' (pen.)
Penalties
Borges (penalty missed); Jensen (penalty scored); Pacius (penalty missed); Achinioti-Jönsson (penalty scored); Hamilton (penalty missed); Sissoko (penalty scored)	3–2	(penalty missed) Shaw; (penalty missed) Bassett; (penalty missed) Salter; (penalty scored) Dos Santos; (penalty scored) Singh; (penalty missed) Verhoven

Tim Hortons Field, Hamilton, Ontario
Attendance: 2,979
Referee: Filip Dujic

May 9
7:00 pm EDT

Toronto FC	1–2	CF Montréal
Insigne 44'	Report	Brault-Guillard 35'; Offor 39'

BMO Field, Toronto, Ontario
Attendance: 17,726
Referee: Yusri Rudolf

== Semi-finals ==
=== Summary ===
Team 1	Score	Team 2
Pacific FC	0–3	Vancouver Whitecaps FC
CF Montréal	2–0	Forge FC

=== Matches ===
May 24
7:00 pm PDT

Pacific FC	0–3	Vancouver Whitecaps FC
	Report	Gressel 14'; Ahmed 17'; Becher 78'

Starlight Stadium, Langford, British Columbia
Attendance: 5,221
Referee: Drew Fischer

May 24
7:00 pm EDT

CF Montréal	2–0	Forge FC
Lassiter 54'; Ibrahim 78'	Report

Saputo Stadium, Montreal, Quebec
Attendance: 10,062
Referee: Pierre-Luc Lauzière

== Final ==
June 7, 2023
7:00 pm PDT

Vancouver Whitecaps FC	2–1	CF Montréal
White 57'; Gauld 65' (pen.)	Report	Ibrahim 83'

BC Place, Vancouver, British Columbia
Attendance: 20,072
Referee: Filip Dujic

== Goalscorers ==
Team eliminated or did not play in this round.

Rank	Player	Team	Goals	By round			
Rank	Player	Team	Goals	PR	QF	SF	F
1	(Nigeria) Sunusi Ibrahim	CF Montréal	3	1		1	1
2	(United States) Simon Becher	Vancouver Whitecaps FC	2		1	1	
2	(United States) Julian Gressel	Vancouver Whitecaps FC	2		1	1	
2	(Canada) Noah Jensen	Forge FC	2	2			
2	(Canada) Matteo Polisi	TSS FC Rovers	2	2			
6	(Canada) Ali Ahmed	Vancouver Whitecaps FC	1			1	
6	(Syria) Molham Babouli	York United FC	1	1			
6	(Northern Ireland) Ollie Bassett	Atlético Ottawa	1		1		
6	(Canada) Kyle Bekker	Forge FC	1		1		
6	(New Zealand) Myer Bevan	Cavalry FC	1	1			
6	(Canada) Zachary Brault-Guillard	CF Montréal	1		1		
6	(Spain) Diego Espejo	Atlético Ottawa	1	1			
6	(Canada) Massimo Ferrin	HFX Wanderers FC	1	1			
6	(Scotland) Ryan Gauld	Vancouver Whitecaps FC	1				1
6	(Wales) Josh Heard	Pacific FC	1		1		
6	(Italy) Lorenzo Insigne	Toronto FC	1		1		
6	(Canada) Levonte Johnson	Vancouver Whitecaps FC	1		1		
6	(Costa Rica) Ariel Lassiter	CF Montréal	1			1	
6	(Canada) Ivan Mejia	TSS FC Rovers	1	1			
6	(Canada) Anthony Novak	Valour FC	1	1			
6	(Nigeria) Chinonso Offor	CF Montréal	1		1		
6	(Canada) Easton Ongaro	Pacific FC	1	1			
6	(Canada) Woobens Pacius	Forge FC	1	1			
6	(Canada) Sean Rea	CF Montréal	1	1			
6	(Canada) Adonijah Reid	Pacific FC	1		1		
6	(Canada) Austin Ricci	York United FC	1		1		
6	(Trinidad and Tobago) Malcolm Shaw	Atlético Ottawa	1	1			
6	(Canada) Maxim Tissot	Atlético Ottawa	1	1			
6	(United States) Brian White	Vancouver Whitecaps FC	1				1

=== Own goals ===
- 1 own goal – (Canada men's national soccer team) Elijah Adekugbe

== Awards ==
- George Gross Memorial Trophy: (United States) Julian Gressel (Vancouver Whitecaps FC)
- Best Young Canadian Player Award: (Canada) Ali Ahmed (Vancouver Whitecaps FC)

== Broadcasting rights ==
Country	Broadcaster	Ref.
Canada	OneSoccer	
United States	Fox Sports	
