= 2022 Pacific FC season =

Canadian soccer club's season of play

Pacific FC
2022 season
- Chairman: Dean Shillington
- Head coach: James Merriman
- Stadium: Starlight Stadium
- Canadian Premier League: 4th
- CPL playoffs: Semi-finals
- Canadian Championship: Quarter-finals
- CONCACAF League: Round of 16
- Top goalscorer: League: Alejandro Díaz (13); All: Alejandro Díaz (16)
- Highest home attendance: 4,687 (August 16 vs. Herediano)
- Lowest home attendance: 2,420 (April 17 vs. Valour FC)
- Average home league attendance: 3,126

The 2022 Pacific FC season was the fourth season in the history of Pacific FC. In addition to the Canadian Premier League, the club also competed in the Canadian Championship and the CONCACAF League.

Pacific FC were the defending CPL champions, having defeated Forge FC in the 2021 Canadian Premier League final. This was the club's first season led by James Merriman, who was announced as the club's new head coach on January 21, 2022.

== Overview ==
As the defending champions, Pacific FC came into the 2022 Canadian Premier League season with high expectations. However, there was significant turnover from the 2021 season. Championship-winning head coach Pa-Modou Kah departed to lead North Texas SC, leaving assistant coach James Merriman in charge. As a result of their impressive performances in the previous season, both Kadin Chung and Lukas MacNaughton signed deals with MLS club Toronto FC; both are tough losses for Pacific's backline. Additionally, forward Terran Campbell and midfielder Alessandro Hojabrpour, who scored the winning goal in the 2021 championship final, both signed with 2021 runners-up Forge FC, to the dismay of Pacific. These changes raised questions about Pacific's capability at repeating last season's success. However, the club retained several of its most important performers, including 2021 MVP Marco Bustos, starting goalkeeper Callum Irving, and prolific striker Alejandro Diaz. The Tridents also signed some new talent, most notably Canadian international defender Amer Đidić from FC Edmonton.

== Squad ==
As of August 22, 2022

| No. | Player | Nationality | Position(s) | Date of birth (age) | Previous club |
Goalkeepers
| 1 | Callum Irving | (Canada) | GK | March 16, 1993 (aged 29) | (Canada) Ottawa Fury |
| 21 | Emil Gazdov | (Canada) | GK | September 11, 2003 (aged 19) | (Germany) FC Nürnberg |
Defenders
| 2 | Georges Mukumbilwa | (Canada) | RB | September 23, 1999 (aged 23) | (Canada) Vancouver Whitecaps FC |
| 3 | Jordan Haynes | (Canada) | LB / LW | January 17, 1996 (aged 26) | (Canada) Vancouver TSS Rovers |
| 5 | Abdou Samake | (Mali) (Canada) | CB | October 7, 1996 (aged 26) | (United States) University of Michigan |
| 13 | Kunle Dada-Luke | (Canada) | FB / RW | January 12, 2000 (aged 22) | (Canada) Atlético Ottawa |
| 26 | Thomas Meilleur-Giguère | (Canada) | CB | November 13, 1997 (aged 25) | (Canada) Montreal Impact |
| 33 | Nathan Mavila | (England) | LB | October 15, 1995 (aged 27) | (England) Wingate & Finchley |
| 55 | Amer Didic | (Canada) | CB | December 28, 1994 (aged 28) | (Canada) FC Edmonton |
Midfielders
| 6 | Umaro Baldé | (Portugal) | CM / AM | October 7, 2002 (aged 20) | (Scotland) Rangers Academy |
| 8 | Matteo Polisi | (Canada) | AM / FW | April 15, 1998 (aged 24) | (Canada) SFU Athletics |
| 11 | Josh Heard | (Wales) | AM | November 29, 1994 (aged 28) | (United States) Real Monarchs |
| 14 | Luca Ricci | (Canada) | CM | February 23, 1998 (aged 24) | (Canada) FC Lanaudière |
| 20 | Sean Young | (Canada) | CM | April 20, 2001 (aged 21) | (Canada) Victoria Highlanders |
| 22 | Jamar Dixon | (Canada) | CM | June 5, 1989 (aged 33) | (Canada) Ottawa Fury |
| 28 | Cédric Toussaint | (Canada) | CM / AM | March 29, 2001 (aged 21) | (Canada) York United |
| 34 | Manny Aparicio | (Canada) | CM | September 17, 1995 (aged 27) | (Canada) York9 FC |
Forwards
| 10 | Marco Bustos | (Canada) | RW / AM | April 22, 1996 (aged 26) | (Canada) Valour FC |
| 15 | Jordan Brown | (England) | ST | November 10, 1996 (aged 26) | (Canada) Electric City FC |
| 19 | Abdul Binate | (Canada) | CF | January 24, 2003 (aged 19) | (Canada) CF Montréal Academy |
| 23 | Djenairo Daniels | (Netherlands) | CF | January 7, 2002 (aged 20) | (Netherlands) FC Utrecht |
| 24 | Gianni dos Santos | (Cape Verde) | CF | November 21, 1998 (aged 24) | (Netherlands) FC Dordrecht |
| 30 | Kamron Habibullah | (Canada) | LW | October 23, 2003 (aged 19) | (Canada) Vancouver Whitecaps FC |

== Transfers ==
=== In ===
| No. | Pos. | Player | From club | Fee/notes | Date | Source |
|---|---|---|---|---|---|---|
| | DF | (Canada) Amer Đidić | (Canada) FC Edmonton | Free | February 9, 2022 | |
| | FW | (Canada) Abdul Binate | (Canada) CF Montréal Academy | Free | February 16, 2022 | |
| | FW | (Netherlands) Djenairo Daniels | (Netherlands) FC Utrecht | Free | February 18, 2022 | |
| | DF | (England) Nathan Mavila | (England) Wingate & Finchley F.C. | Free | March 7, 2022 | |
| | MF | (Portugal) Umaro Baldé | (Scotland) Rangers Academy | Free | March 16, 2022 | |
| | DF | (Canada) Georges Mukumbilwa | (Canada) Vancouver Whitecaps FC | Free | March 18, 2022 | |
| | MF | (Canada) Simon Triantafillou | (Canada) Forge FC | Free, signed and loaned to FC Edmonton | April 15, 2022 | |
| | MF | (Haiti) Bicou Bissainthe | (Armenia) Sevan FC | Free, signed and loaned to FC Edmonton | April 22, 2022 | |
| | MF | (Canada) Luca Ricci | (Canada) Montreal Carabins | Selected 8th overall in the 2022 CPL–U Sports Draft | May 12, 2022 | |
| | MF | (Canada) Cédric Toussaint | (Canada) York United | Undisclosed sell-on clause, and loan of Matthew Baldisimo | August 11, 2022 | |
| | FW | (England) Jordan Brown | (Canada) Electric City FC | Free | August 22, 2022 | |

==== Loans in ====
| No. | Pos. | Player | Loaned from | Fee/notes | Date | Source |
|---|---|---|---|---|---|---|
| | FW | (Canada) Kamron Habibullah | (Canada) Vancouver Whitecaps FC | Season-long loan | March 11, 2022 | |

==== Draft picks ====
Pacific FC made the following selections in the 2022 CPL–U Sports Draft. Draft picks are not automatically signed to the team roster. Only those who are signed to a contract will be listed as transfers in.

| Round | Selection | Pos. | Player | Nationality | University |
|---|---|---|---|---|---|
| 1 | 8 | MF | Luca Ricci | Canada | Université de Montréal |
| 2 | 16 | DF | Rees Goertzen | Canada | University of Victoria |

=== Out ===
| No. | Pos. | Player | To club | Fee/notes | Date | Source |
|---|---|---|---|---|---|---|
| | DF | (Canada) Duran Lee | | Released | January 14, 2022 | |
| 2 | DF | (Canada) Kadin Chung | (Canada) Toronto FC | Undisclosed | February 23, 2022 | |
| 6 | DF | (Canada) Lukas MacNaughton | (Canada) Toronto FC | Undisclosed | February 23, 2022 | |
| 7 | MF | (Spain) Victor Blasco | (Honduras) Vida | Undisclosed | December 16, 2021 | |
| 14 | FW | (Canada) Terran Campbell | (Canada) Forge FC | Free | January 7, 2022 | |
| 18 | DF | (Canada) Robert Boskovic | | Released | January 14, 2022 | |
| 21 | MF | (Canada) Alessandro Hojabrpour | (Canada) Forge FC | Free | January 7, 2022 | |
| 23 | MF | (England) Ollie Bassett | (Canada) Atlético Ottawa | Free | January 14, 2022 | |
| 31 | GK | (Canada) Isaac Boehmer | (Canada) Vancouver Whitecaps FC | Loan ended | January 14, 2022 | |
| 9 | FW | (Mexico) Alejandro Díaz | (Norway) Sogndal | Undisclosed fee & sell-on clause | August 10, 2022 | |

==== Loans out ====
| No. | Pos. | Player | Loaned to | Fee/notes | Date | Source |
|---|---|---|---|---|---|---|
| | DF | (Canada) Paul Amedume | (United States) North Texas SC | Season-long loan | February 10, 2022 | |
| | MF | (Canada) Simon Triantafillou | (Canada) FC Edmonton | Season-long loan | April 15, 2022 | |
| | MF | (Haiti) Bicou Bissainthe | (Canada) FC Edmonton | Season-long loan | April 22, 2022 | |
| | MF | (Canada) Matthew Baldisimo | (Canada) York United | Season-long loan | August 11, 2022 | |

== Pre-season and friendlies ==
Win Draw Loss Fixtures

| March 11 Friendly | Victoria Vikes | 0–1 | Pacific FC | Victoria, British Columbia |
| 7:00pm | | Report | | Stadium: Centennial Stadium |

| March 18 Friendly | Pacific FC | 2–1 | York United FC | Langford, British Columbia |
| 1:00pm | | Report | | Stadium: Starlight Stadium |

== Competitions ==
Matches are listed in Langford local time: Pacific Daylight Time (UTC−7) until November 5, and Pacific Standard Time (UTC−8) otherwise.

=== Overview ===
| Competition | First match | Last match | Starting round | Final position | Record | | | | | | | |
| Competition | First match | Last match | Starting round | Final position | Pld | W | D | L | GF | GA | GD | Win % |
|---|---|---|---|---|---|---|---|---|---|---|---|---|
| Canadian Premier League | April 10 | October 8 | Matchday 1 | 4th | 28 | 13 | 7 | 8 | 36 | 33 | +3 | 46.43 |
| CPL Playoffs | October 15 | October 23 | Semifinals | Semifinals | 2 | 0 | 1 | 1 | 1 | 3 | −2 | 0.00 |
| Canadian Championship | May 24 | May 24 | Quarter-finals | Quarter-finals | 1 | 0 | 1 | 0 | 2 | 2 | +0 | 0.00 |
| CONCACAF League | July 26 | August 23 | Preliminary Round | Round of 16 | 4 | 2 | 1 | 1 | 7 | 1 | +6 | 50.00 |
| Total | | | | | 35 | 15 | 10 | 10 | 46 | 39 | +7 | 42.86 |

Last updated: October 23, 2022
Source: Competitions

=== Canadian Premier League ===
==== Table ====
| Pos | Team | Pld | W | D | L | GF | GA | GD | Pts | Qualification |
|---|---|---|---|---|---|---|---|---|---|---|
| 1 | Atlético Ottawa (S) | 28 | 13 | 10 | 5 | 36 | 29 | +7 | 49 | Advance to playoffs |
| 2 | Forge (C) | 28 | 14 | 5 | 9 | 47 | 25 | +22 | 47 | Advance to playoffs |
| 3 | Cavalry | 28 | 14 | 5 | 9 | 39 | 33 | +6 | 47 | Advance to playoffs |
| 4 | Pacific | 28 | 13 | 7 | 8 | 36 | 33 | +3 | 46 | Advance to playoffs |
| 5 | Valour | 28 | 10 | 7 | 11 | 36 | 34 | +2 | 37 | |
| 6 | York United | 28 | 9 | 7 | 12 | 31 | 37 | −6 | 34 | |
| 7 | HFX Wanderers | 28 | 8 | 5 | 15 | 24 | 38 | −14 | 29 | |
| 8 | FC Edmonton | 28 | 4 | 8 | 16 | 31 | 51 | −20 | 20 | |

Source: CanPL.ca
Rules for classification: 1) points; 2) total wins; 3) goal differential; 4) goals for; 5) away goals differential; 6) away goals for; 7) home goals differential; 8) home goals for; 9) U-21 minutes; 10) coin toss or drawing of lots.
(C) Champion; (S) Regular season winner

==== Results by match ====
| Match | 1 | 2 | 3 | 4 | 5 | 6 | 7 | 8 | 9 | 10 | 11 | 12 | 13 | 14 | 15 | 16 | 17 | 18 | 19 | 20 | 21 | 22 | 23 | 24 | 25 | 26 | 27 | 28 |
|---|---|---|---|---|---|---|---|---|---|---|---|---|---|---|---|---|---|---|---|---|---|---|---|---|---|---|---|---|
| Result | W | W | W | D | L | W | W | D | D | L | L | D | L | D | W | W | W | W | W | L | L | L | D | D | W | W | W | L |
| Position | 1 | 1 | 1 | 1 | 1 | 1 | 1 | 1 | 1 | 1 | 1 | 2 | 2 | 3 | 3 | 2 | 1 | 1 | 2 | 3 | 4 | 4 | 5 | 5 | 4 | 2 | 2 | 4 |

Updated to match(es) played on September 11, 2022. Source: #Matches
W = Win; D = Draw; L = Loss

==== Matches ====
| April 10 1 | Pacific FC | 2–1 | Forge FC | Langford, British Columbia |
| 4:00pm | Díaz 5'; Meilleur-Giguère (yellow card) 49'; Đidić 57'; Mavila (yellow card) 68'; Daniels (yellow card) 81'; Samake (yellow card) 88' | Report | Poku (yellow card) 44'; Achinioti-Jönsson 89' | Stadium: Starlight Stadium; Attendance: 4,038; Referee: Juan Marquez |

| April 17 2 | Pacific FC | 3–2 | Valour FC | Langford, British Columbia |
| 1:00pm | Aparicio 20'; Dada-Luke (yellow card) 32'; Díaz 33'; Heard 56' | Report | Mikhael (red card) 26'; Dada-Luke 42' (o.g.); Akio (yellow card) 45'; Dyer 90+3' (pen.) | Stadium: Starlight Stadium; Attendance: 2,420; Referee: Alain Ruch |

| April 23 3 | Pacific FC | 2–1 | HFX Wanderers FC | Langford, British Columbia |
| 4:00pm | Aparicio 25', (yellow card) 56'; Samake (yellow card) 71'; Díaz 85' (pen.); Daniels (yellow card) 90+1' | Report | Bent 45+1'; Tabi (yellow card) 58' | Stadium: Starlight Stadium; Attendance: 3,042; Referee: Juan Marquez |

| April 27 4 | FC Edmonton | 0–0 | Pacific FC | Edmonton, Alberta |
| 6:00pm | Singh (yellow card) 32' | | Aparicio (yellow card) 37'; Mukumbilwa (yellow card) 73' | Stadium: Clarke Stadium; Attendance: 765; Referee: Scott Bowman |

| May 1 5 | Cavalry FC | 2–0 | Pacific FC | Foothills County, Alberta |
| 2:30pm | Musse 2'; Aird (yellow card) 24'; Mason 37', (yellow card) 45+3'; Norman Jr. (yellow card) 60' | | Mavila (yellow card) 52'; Young (yellow card) 86' | Stadium: ATCO Field; Attendance: 4,206; Referee: Alain Ruch |

| May 7 6 | Atlético Ottawa | 0–1 | Pacific FC | Ottawa, Ontario |
| 3:00pm | Sissoko (yellow card) 77' | Report | Díaz 72'; Đidić (yellow card) 77' | Stadium: TD Place Stadium; Attendance: 3,555; Referee: Yusri Rudolf |

| May 14 7 | Pacific FC | 2–1 | FC Edmonton | Langford, British Columbia |
| 4:00pm | Díaz 10'; Heard 62'; Habibullah (yellow card) 74'; Daniels (yellow card) 86' | Report | Mohammed (yellow card) 10'; Timoteo 73' | Stadium: Starlight Stadium; Attendance: 3,424; Referee: Carly Shaw-MacLaren |

| May 20 8 | Pacific FC | 0–0 | York United FC | Langford, British Columbia |
| 7:00pm | Heard (yellow card) 7'; dos Santos (yellow card) 60'; Mavila (yellow card) 90+2' | Report | Abzi (yellow card) 45' | Stadium: Starlight Stadium; Attendance: 2,620 |

| May 28 9 | Pacific FC | 2–2 | Valour FC | Langford, British Columbia |
| 4:00pm | dos Santos 56'; Díaz 71'; Đidić (yellow card) 90+3'; Baldisimo (yellow card) 90+3' | Report | Baquero (yellow card) 21'; Rea 36'; Fordyce 48'; Gutiérrez (yellow card) 90+3'; Ponce (yellow card) 90+3' | Stadium: Starlight Stadium; Attendance: 2,925; Referee: Alain Ruch |

| June 5 10 | Atlético Ottawa | 2–1 | Pacific FC | Ottawa, Ontario |
| 10:00am | Shaw 62'; Bahous (yellow card) 66'; Verhoven (yellow card) 78', (goal) 86' | Report | Mavila (yellow card) 33'; dos Santos (yellow card) 65'; Dada-Luke (yellow card) 78'; Heard 83' | Stadium: TD Place Stadium; Attendance: 4,176; Referee: Ben Hoskins |

| June 12 11 | Forge FC | 3–0 | Pacific FC | Hamilton, Ontario |
| 1:00pm | Morgan 11'; Borges 13'; Rama (yellow card) 50'; Pacius 83' | Report | Dada-Luke (yellow card) 24'; Heard (yellow card) 74' | Stadium: Tim Hortons Field; Attendance: 3,111; Referee: David Barrie |

| June 18 12 | York United FC | 0–0 | Pacific FC | Toronto, Ontario |
| 1:00pm | Hernández (yellow card) 45+2'; Johnston (yellow card) 84' | Report | Dixon (yellow card) 8'; Samake (yellow card) 76' | Stadium: York Lions Stadium; Attendance: 1,012; Referee: Filip Dujic |

| June 25 13 | Pacific FC | 0–3 | HFX Wanderers FC | Langford, British Columbia |
| 2:00pm | Dixon (yellow card) 57' | Report | Samb 24'; Daniels 36'; Salter 71' (pen.); Fernandez (yellow card) 72'; Schaale (yellow card) 79'; Oxner (yellow card) 87' | Stadium: Starlight Stadium; Attendance: 3,290; Referee: Alain Ruch |

| June 30 14 | Pacific FC | 3–3 | Cavalry FC | Langford, British Columbia |
| 6:30pm | Daniels 6'; Aparicio (red card) 29'; dos Santos 43'; Dada-Luke (yellow card) 49'; Díaz 74' | Report | Norman Jr. (red card) 29'; Klomp 45+4'; Escalante 50', (yellow card) 53'; Pepple 56' | Stadium: Starlight Stadium; Attendance: 3,017; Referee: Yusri Rudolf |

| July 9 15 | FC Edmonton | 2–3 | Pacific FC | Edmonton, Alberta |
| 1:00pm | Bitar 79'; Camara 83' | Report | Young 39', (yellow card) 89'; Heard 43'; Daniels 59' | Stadium: Clarke Stadium; Attendance: 1,356; Referee: Mo Mohseni |

| July 15 16 | York United FC | 2–4 | Pacific FC | Toronto, Ontario |
| 4:30pm | Kratt 1'; Giantsopoulos (yellow card) 31'; De Rosario 49'; Toussaint (yellow card) 56'; Ferrari (yellow card) 74' | Report | Daniels (yellow card) 31'; Díaz 42' (pen.), 63', 70'; Young (yellow card) 65'; Heard (yellow card) 72'; Dixon (yellow card) 85'; dos Santos 87', (yellow card) 90+4' | Stadium: York Lions Stadium; Attendance: 1,030; Referee: Fabrizio Stasolla |

| July 22 17 | Pacific FC | 3–0 | Cavalry FC | Langford, British Columbia |
| 7:00pm | Bustos 24', (yellow card) 25'; Aparicio (yellow card) 32'; Escalante 50' (o.g.); Díaz 68' | Report | Norman Jr. (yellow card) 15'; Klomp (yellow card) 26'; Trafford (yellow card) 32'; Escalante (yellow card) 43' | Stadium: Starlight Stadium; Attendance: 3,238; Referee: Alain Ruch |

| July 30 18 | Valour FC | 1–2 | Pacific FC | Winnipeg, Manitoba |
| 12:00pm | de Brienne 23'; Ascanio (yellow card) 33' (yellow-red card) 62' | Report | Mukumbilwa (yellow card) 8'; Díaz 71', 73'; Daniels (yellow card) 80' | Stadium: IG Field; Attendance: 3,109; Referee: David Barrie |

| August 13 19 | Pacific FC | 1–0 | Atlético Ottawa | Langford, British Columbia |
| 2:00pm | Heard 8', (yellow card) 80'; Bustos (yellow card) 29' | Report | Moragrega (yellow card) 19'; Beckie (yellow card) 89' | Stadium: Starlight Stadium; Attendance: 3,244; Referee: David Barrie |

| August 20 20 | HFX Wanderers FC | 1–0 | Pacific FC | Halifax, Nova Scotia |
| 10:30am | Schaale (yellow card) 68'; Omar (yellow card) 71'; Lamothe 82' | Report | Đidić (yellow card) 19'; Aparicio (red card) 29'; Young (yellow card) 30'; Bustos (yellow card) 31'; Samake (yellow card) 40' | Stadium: Wanderers Grounds; Attendance: 5,729; Referee: Mathieu Souaré |

| August 28 21 | Valour FC | 1–0 | Pacific FC | Winnipeg, Manitoba |
| 12:00pm | Rea (yellow card) 43'; de Brienne (yellow card) 50'; Dyer (yellow card) 56'; Romeo 62' | Report | Daniels (yellow card) 26' | Stadium: IG Field; Attendance: 2,908 |

| September 3 22 | Pacific FC | 1–3 | York United FC | Langford, British Columbia |
| 2:00pm | Dada-Luke 31' | Report | Wilson (yellow card) 22'; Babouli 48'; De Rosario 57'; S. Gutiérrez 81' | Stadium: Starlight Stadium; Attendance: 3,133 |

| September 11 23 | Pacific FC | 1–1 | Atlético Ottawa | Langford, British Columbia |
| 1:00pm | Young (yellow card) 35'; Đidić 45+3', (yellow card) 90+3'; Dada-Luke (yellow card) 69' | | Bassett 26' (pen.); Tabla (yellow card) 30'; Espejo (yellow card) 90+5' | Stadium: Starlight Stadium; Attendance: 2,645 |

| September 18 24 | Pacific FC | 1–1 | Forge FC | Langford, British Columbia |
| 5:00pm | Achinioti-Jönsson 17' (o.g.); Dixon (yellow card) 18'; Meilleur-Giguère (yellow card) 27' | Report | Hojabrpour 4', (yellow card) 21'; Poku (yellow card) 66'; Metusala (yellow card) 70' | Stadium: Starlight Stadium; Attendance: 3,350 |

| September 27 25 | HFX Wanderers FC | 0–2 | Pacific FC | Halifax, Nova Scotia |
| 11:30am | Fernandez (yellow card) 18' | Report | dos Santos (yellow card) 32'; Đidić (yellow card) 37'; Daniels 45'; Heard 69'; Mavila (yellow card) 90+3' | Stadium: Wanderers Grounds |

| September 30 26 | Pacific FC | 1–0 | FC Edmonton | Langford, British Columbia |
| 7:00pm | Bustos 1'; Dixon (yellow card) 72'; Heard (yellow card) 78' | Report | Smith (yellow card) 13'; Triantafillou (yellow card) 18'; Loughrey (yellow card) 90+4' | Stadium: Starlight Stadium; Attendance: 4,107 |

| October 5 27 | Forge FC | 0–1 | Pacific FC | Hamilton, Ontario |
| 4:00pm | Owolabi-Belewu (yellow card) 11'; Achinioti-Jönsson (yellow card) 85' | Report | Brown 60', (yellow card) 68'; Heard (yellow card) 82' | Stadium: Tim Hortons Field; Attendance: 2,412; Referee: Pierre-Luc Lauzière |
Note: This match was originally scheduled for August 16, but was rescheduled after Pacific FC advanced to the CONCACAF League Round of 16.

| October 8 28 | Cavalry FC | 1–0 | Pacific FC | Foothills County, Alberta |
| 3:00pm | Alarcón Sáez (yellow card) 40'; Musse (yellow card) 70'; M. Trafford (yellow card) 75'; Fisk 89'; Smith-Doyle (yellow card) 90+2' | Report | Haynes (yellow card) 61'; Mukumbilwa (yellow card) 66'; Toussaint (yellow card) 73' | Stadium: ATCO Field; Attendance: 3,401 |

==== Playoffs ====
===== Semifinals =====
| October 15 Leg 1 | Pacific FC | 0–2 | Atlético Ottawa | Langford, British Columbia |
| 7:00pm ET | Didic (yellow card) 10'; Heard (yellow card) 73' | Report | Tabla (yellow card) 63', (goal) 79'; Camus (yellow card) 70'; Espejo (yellow card) 75'; Haworth (yellow card) 77'; Bahous (yellow card) 90+1'; Verhoven 90+4' | Stadium: Starlight Stadium; Attendance: 3,759; Referee: Mathieu Souaré |

| October 23 Leg 2 | Atlético Ottawa | 1–1 (3–1 agg.) | Pacific FC | Ottawa, Ontario |
| 2:00pm ET | Shaw 83', (yellow card) 84' | Report | Meilleur-Giguère 28', (yellow card) 77'; Bustos (yellow card) 43'; Samake (yellow card) 64'; Young (yellow card) 85' | Stadium: TD Place Stadium; Attendance: 8,428; Referee: Jean-Luc Lauzière |

=== Canadian Championship ===
| May 24 Quarter-finals | Pacific FC | 2–2 (3–4 p) | York United FC | Langford, British Columbia |
| 7:00pm PT | Đidić 11', 90+7', (yellow card) 90+8'; Daniels (yellow card) 79'; Heard (yellow card) 82' | Report | Verhoeven (yellow card) 13'; Thompson 25'; N'sa (yellow card) 29'; De Rosario 31'; Zator (yellow card) 36'; Gutiérrez (yellow card) 45'; Johnston (yellow card) 57'; Hernández (yellow card) 90'; Giantsopoulos (yellow card) 90+11' | Stadium: Starlight Stadium; Referee: Filip Dujic |
| | Penalties |
| | Meilleur-Giguère (penalty scored); Díaz (penalty missed); dos Santos (penalty scored); Daniels (penalty scored); Bustos (penalty missed) | | (penalty scored) Abzi; (penalty scored) Zator; (penalty scored) Hernández; (penalty missed) Eduardo; (penalty scored) Wilson |

=== CONCACAF League ===
==== Preliminary round ====
| July 26 First leg | Waterhouse (Jamaica) | 0–0 | (Canada) Pacific FC | Kingston, Jamaica |
| 5:00pm | Grey (yellow card) 44' | Report | Aparicio (yellow card) 80' | Stadium: Sabina Park; Referee: Josué Ugalde |

| August 2 Second leg | Pacific FC (Canada) | 6–0 (6–0 agg.) | (Jamaica) Waterhouse | Langford, British Columbia |
| 7:00pm | Díaz 13', 54', 73'; Bustos 41'; Heard 56', 61' | Report | | Stadium: Starlight Stadium; Attendance: 4,506; Referee: Nima Saghafi |

==== Round of 16 ====
| August 16 First leg | Pacific FC (Canada) | 0–1 | (Costa Rica) Herediano | Langford, British Columbia |
| 7:00pm | Daniels (yellow card) 18'; Mavila (yellow card) 40'; Đidić (yellow card) 88' | Report | Ruiz (yellow card) 52'; Brenes 83' | Stadium: Starlight Stadium; Attendance: 4,687; Referee: José Torres |

| August 23 Second leg | Herediano (Costa Rica) | 0–1 (1–1 agg.) (6–5 p) | (Canada) Pacific FC | San José, Costa Rica |
| 5:15pm | López (yellow card) 55'; Brenes (yellow card) 90+1' | Report | Dixon (red card) 55'; Samake (yellow card) 78'; Daniels (yellow card) 85'; dos Santos 89', (yellow card) 90' | Stadium: Estadio Ricardo Saprissa Aymá; Referee: Bryan López |
| | Penalties |
| | Basulto (penalty missed); Rocha (penalty scored); Brenes (penalty scored); López (penalty scored); Campos (penalty scored); Galo (penalty scored); Soto (penalty scored) | | (penalty scored) Meilleur-Giguère; (penalty scored) Heard; (penalty scored) Bustos; (penalty missed) Daniels; (penalty scored) Aparicio; (penalty scored) dos Santos; (penalty missed) Đidić |

== Statistics ==
=== Squad and statistics ===
As of June 18, 2022

| No. | Pos | Nat | Player | Total | | Canadian Premier League | | Canadian Championship | | CONCACAF League | |
| No. | Pos | Nat | Player | Apps | Goals | Apps | Goals | Apps | Goals | Apps | Goals |
|---|---|---|---|---|---|---|---|---|---|---|---|
| 1 | GK | (Canada) CAN | Callum Irving | 13 | 0 | 12+0 | 0 | 1+0 | 0 | 0+0 | 0 |
| 2 | DF | (Canada) CAN | Georges Mukumbilwa | 4 | 0 | 2+2 | 0 | 0+0 | 0 | 0+0 | 0 |
| 3 | DF | (Canada) CAN | Jordan Haynes | 6 | 0 | 4+2 | 0 | 0+0 | 0 | 0+0 | 0 |
| 5 | DF | (Mali) MLI | Abdou Samake | 10 | 0 | 6+3 | 0 | 0+1 | 0 | 0+0 | 0 |
| 6 | MF | (Portugal) POR | Umaro Baldé | 1 | 0 | 1+0 | 0 | 0+0 | 0 | 0+0 | 0 |
| 7 | FW | (Netherlands) NED | Gianni dos Santos | 10 | 1 | 2+7 | 1 | 1+0 | 0 | 0+0 | 0 |
| 8 | MF | (Canada) CAN | Matteo Polisi | 5 | 0 | 2+3 | 0 | 0+0 | 0 | 0+0 | 0 |
| 9 | FW | (Mexico) MEX | Alejandro Díaz | 13 | 6 | 11+1 | 6 | 1+0 | 0 | 0+0 | 0 |
| 10 | MF | (Canada) CAN | Marco Bustos | 13 | 0 | 12+0 | 0 | 1+0 | 0 | 0+0 | 0 |
| 11 | MF | (Wales) WAL | Josh Heard | 12 | 3 | 9+2 | 3 | 1+0 | 0 | 0+0 | 0 |
| 13 | DF | (Canada) CAN | Kunle Dada-Luke | 10 | 0 | 9+0 | 0 | 1+0 | 0 | 0+0 | 0 |
| 14 | MF | (Canada) CAN | Luca Ricci | 6 | 0 | 1+4 | 0 | 1+0 | 0 | 0+0 | 0 |
| 20 | MF | (Canada) CAN | Sean Young | 8 | 0 | 3+5 | 0 | 0+0 | 0 | 0+0 | 0 |
| 21 | GK | (Canada) CAN | Emil Gazdov | 0 | 0 | 0+0 | 0 | 0+0 | 0 | 0+0 | 0 |
| 22 | MF | (Canada) CAN | Jamar Dixon | 10 | 0 | 9+0 | 0 | 1+0 | 0 | 0+0 | 0 |
| 23 | FW | (Netherlands) NED | Djenairo Daniels | 11 | 0 | 2+8 | 0 | 0+1 | 0 | 0+0 | 0 |
| 26 | DF | (Canada) CAN | Thomas Meilleur-Giguère | 12 | 0 | 11+0 | 0 | 1+0 | 0 | 0+0 | 0 |
| 30 | FW | (Canada) CAN | Kamron Habibullah | 7 | 0 | 3+4 | 0 | 0+0 | 0 | 0+0 | 0 |
| 33 | DF | (England) ENG | Nathan Mavila | 9 | 0 | 6+2 | 0 | 1+0 | 0 | 0+0 | 0 |
| 34 | MF | (Canada) CAN | Manny Aparicio | 8 | 2 | 8+0 | 2 | 0+0 | 0 | 0+0 | 0 |
| 55 | DF | (Canada) CAN | Amer Đidić | 13 | 3 | 11+1 | 1 | 1+0 | 2 | 0+0 | 0 |
| 66 | MF | (Canada) CAN | Matthew Baldisimo | 9 | 0 | 8+1 | 0 | 0+0 | 0 | 0+0 | 0 |

=== Top scorers ===
| Rank | Nat. | Player | Pos. | Canadian Premier League | Canadian Championship | CONCACAF League | TOTAL |
|---|---|---|---|---|---|---|---|
| 1 | (Mexico) | Alejandro Díaz | FW | 6 | 0 | 0 | 6 |
| 2 | (Wales) | Josh Heard | MF | 3 | 0 | 0 | 3 |
| 2 | (Canada) | Amer Đidić | DF | 1 | 2 | 0 | 3 |
| 4 | (Canada) | Manny Aparicio | MF | 2 | 0 | 0 | 2 |
| 5 | (Netherlands) | Gianni dos Santos | FW | 1 | 0 | 0 | 1 |
| Totals | | | | 13 | 2 | 0 | 15 |

=== Disciplinary record ===
| No. | Pos. | Nat. | Player | Canadian Premier League | | Canadian Championship | | CONCACAF League | | TOTAL | |
| No. | Pos. | Nat. | Player | Yellow card | Red card | Yellow card | Red card | Yellow card | Red card | Yellow card | Red card |
|---|---|---|---|---|---|---|---|---|---|---|---|
| 33 | DF | (England) | Nathan Mavila | 4 | 0 | 0 | 0 | 0 | 0 | 4 | 0 |
| 23 | FW | (Netherlands) | Djenairo Daniels | 3 | 0 | 1 | 0 | 0 | 0 | 4 | 0 |
| 5 | DF | (Mali) | Abdou Samake | 3 | 0 | 0 | 0 | 0 | 0 | 3 | 0 |
| 13 | DF | (Canada) | Kunle Dada-Luke | 3 | 0 | 0 | 0 | 0 | 0 | 3 | 0 |
| 11 | MF | (Wales) | Josh Heard | 2 | 0 | 1 | 0 | 0 | 0 | 3 | 0 |
| 55 | DF | (Canada) | Amer Đidić | 2 | 0 | 1 | 0 | 0 | 0 | 3 | 0 |
| 7 | FW | (Netherlands) | Gianni dos Santos | 2 | 0 | 0 | 0 | 0 | 0 | 2 | 0 |
| 34 | MF | (Canada) | Manny Aparicio | 2 | 0 | 0 | 0 | 0 | 0 | 2 | 0 |
| 2 | DF | (Canada) | Georges Mukumbilwa | 1 | 0 | 0 | 0 | 0 | 0 | 1 | 0 |
| 20 | MF | (Canada) | Sean Young | 1 | 0 | 0 | 0 | 0 | 0 | 1 | 0 |
| 22 | MF | (Canada) | Jamar Dixon | 1 | 0 | 0 | 0 | 0 | 0 | 1 | 0 |
| 26 | DF | (Canada) | Thomas Meilleur-Giguère | 1 | 0 | 0 | 0 | 0 | 0 | 1 | 0 |
| 30 | FW | (Canada) | Kamron Habibullah | 1 | 0 | 0 | 0 | 0 | 0 | 1 | 0 |
| 66 | MF | (Canada) | Matthew Baldisimo | 1 | 0 | 0 | 0 | 0 | 0 | 1 | 0 |
| Totals | | | | 27 | 0 | 3 | 0 | 0 | 0 | 30 | 0 |
