= David Brazão =

Portuguese footballer (born 2001)

Personal information
- Full name: David Oliveira Santos Cavaleiro Brazão
- Date of birth: 1 November 2001 (age 25)
- Place of birth: Lisbon, Portugal
- Height: 1.65 m (5 ft 5 in)
- Position: Winger

Team information
- Current team: S.U. 1º Dezembro
- Number: 28

Youth career
- 2009–2011: Alcochetense
- 2011–2012: Club Internacional de Foot-ball
- 2012–2014: Algés
- 2014–2015: Sporting CP
- 2015–2017: Belenenses
- 2017–2018: Benfica
- 2018–2019: Belenenses
- 2019: Leixões
- 2019–2020: Estoril Praia
- 2020–2022: Belenenses
- 2022: Mafra

Senior career*
Years	Team	Apps	(Gls)
2018–2019	Belenenses	5	(3)
2019	Estoril Praia B	0	(0)
2020–2022	Belenenses	23	(2)
2022–2023	Sintrense	18	(6)
2023	Pacific FC	12	(2)
2024	FC Džiugas Telšiai	25	(1)
2025–	S.U. 1º Dezembro	4	(0)
- * Club domestic league appearances and goals as of 25 June 2025

David Oliveira Santos Cavaleiro Brazão (born 1 November 2001) is a Portuguese professional footballer who plays as a winger for S.U. 1º Dezembro.

== Early life ==
Brazão began playing youth football with Algés. Afterwards he joined the Sporting CP Youth Academy, followed by the youth system of Belenenses. In September 2017, he joined the Benfica youth system. He then returned to Belenenses, before moving to Estoril Praia, followed by another return to Belenenses. In July 2022, he joined the U23 side of Mafra.

== Career ==
Brazão began his senior with Belenenses, being part of their 2018/19 AF Lisboa 2nd division winning team, scoring three goals in six games across all competitions. After he joined Estoril Praia, having a stint with the B team. In August 2020, he returned to Belenenses. In July 2021, he extended his contract with Belenenses for another year, for their first year in the Campeonato de Portugal, after having been promoted. In 2022, he joined Sintrense, where he scored six goals and added three assists in 18 appearances, while also earning multiple team of the week honours,

In March 2023, he signed with Canadian Premier League club Pacific FC. He made his debut for the club on 20 April 2023 in a Canadian Championship match against Cavalry FC, in a substitute appearance. He scored his first goal on 14 May in a league match against York United FC. In November 2023, David was released by Pacific FC, after having made 14 appearances and scored twice.

In January 2024, he signed with Lithuanian club FC Dziugas.

== Career statistics ==
As of 9 August 2024

Appearances and goals by club, season and competition
Club	Season	League			Playoffs		National cup		Other		Total	
Club	Season	Division	Apps	Goals	Apps	Goals	Apps	Goals	Apps	Goals	Apps	Goals
Belenenses	2018–19	AF Lisboa 2ª Divisão	5	3	—		—		1 (Note: Appearances in the Taça AF Lisboa)	0	6	3
Estoril Praia B	2019–20	AF Lisboa 2ª Divisão	0	0	—		—		1	0	1	0
Belenenses	2020–21	AF Lisboa 1ª Divisão	11	0	—		—		0	0	11	0
Belenenses	2021–22	Campeonato de Portugal	12	2	—		2 (Note: Appearances in the Taça de Portugal)	0	—		14	2
Belenenses	Total		23	2	0	0	2	0	0	0	25	2
Sintrense	2022–23	Campeonato de Portugal	18	6	—		1	0	—		19	6
Pacific FC	2023	Canadian Premier League	12	2	0	0	2 (Note: Appearances in the Canadian Championship)	0	—		14	2
FC Džiugas Telšiai	2024	A Lyga	14	0	—		0	0	—		14	0
Career total			72	13	0	0	7	0	0	0	79	13
