= Cédric Toussaint =

Haitian footballer (born 2001)

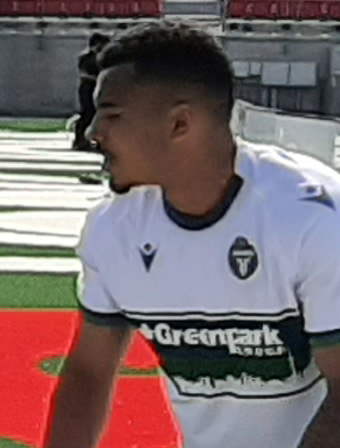
- Toussaint with York United FC in 2022

Personal information
- Date of birth: 29 March 2001 (age 25)
- Place of birth: Drummondville, Quebec, Canada
- Height: 1.67 m (5 ft 6 in)
- Position: Midfielder

Team information
- Current team: CS St-Laurent

Youth career
- AS Pointe-aux-Trembles
- CS Rivière-des-Prairies
- CS Panellinios
- 2013: CS Mercier-Hochelaga-Maisonneuve
- 2013–2020: Montreal Impact

Senior career*
Years	Team	Apps	(Gls)
2021–2022	York United	38	(0)
2022–2024	Pacific FC	51	(0)
2025	Iwate Grulla Morioka	5	(0)
2026–	CS St-Laurent	1	(0)

International career^{‡}
2024–	Haiti	1	(0)
- * Club domestic league appearances and goals as of April 9, 2026 ‡ National team caps and goals as of 24 March 2024

Cédric Toussaint (born 29 March 2001) is a professional footballer who plays as a midfielder for CS St-Laurent in Ligue1 Québec. Born in Canada, he represents the Haiti national team.

== Early life ==
Toussaint grew up in Drummondville, Quebec. He began playing soccer at age four with AS Pointe-aux-Trembles. Afterwards, he played for CS Rivière-des-Prairies, CS Panellinios, and CS Mercier-Hochelaga-Maisonneuve. In 2013, he moved to the Montreal Impact Academy, where he spent eight years until signing a professional contract in 2020. In 2020, he played with the revived Montreal Impact U23.

== Club career ==
In November 2020, Toussaint signed his first professional contract with Canadian Premier League side York United, a two-year deal with multiple club options. In November 2021, Toussaint signed an extension with York United until 2024. During the 2022 season, he received two red cards, both against Atlético Ottawa. During his time with York, he made 43 appearances, across all competitions.

In August 2022, Toussaint transferred to fellow CPL club Pacific FC mid-season on a permanent deal, in exchange for York receiving Matthew Baldisimo on loan. He made his debut for Pacific against the HFX Wanderers on August 20. In November 2022, Pacific confirmed his return for the 2023 season.

In March 2025, Toussaint signed with Iwate Grulla Morioka of the Japan Football League, signing a one-year contract.

== International career ==
=== Canada ===
In 2016, he attended a camp with the Canada U15 team. In 2020, he was invited to train with the Canada U23 team ahead of the 2020 CONCACAF Men's Olympic Qualifying Championship, but the tournament was postponed until 2021.

=== Haiti ===
In March 2024, Toussaint accepted a call-up from Haiti ahead of an international friendly against French Guiana. He made his debut in the match as a substitute.

== Personal life ==
Toussaint is the son of Haitian-Canadian coach and former footballer Jean-Robert Toussaint.

== Career statistics ==
As of October 1, 2024

Club	Season	League			Playoffs		National Cup		Continental		Total	
Club	Season	Division	Apps	Goals	Apps	Goals	Apps	Goals	Apps	Goals	Apps	Goals
York United FC	2021	Canadian Premier League	24	0	0	0	2	0	–		26	0
York United FC	2022	Canadian Premier League	14	0	–		3	0	–		17	0
York United FC	Total		38	0	0	0	3	0	0	0	41	0
Pacific FC	2022	Canadian Premier League	9	0	2	0	0	0	2	0	13	0
Pacific FC	2023	Canadian Premier League	23	0	3	0	2	0	–		28	0
Pacific FC	2024	Canadian Premier League	19	0	0	0	4	0	–		23	0
Pacific FC	Total		51	0	5	0	6	0	2	0	54	0
Career total			89	0	5	0	9	0	2	0	105	0
