= Emil Gazdov =

Canadian soccer player (born 2003)

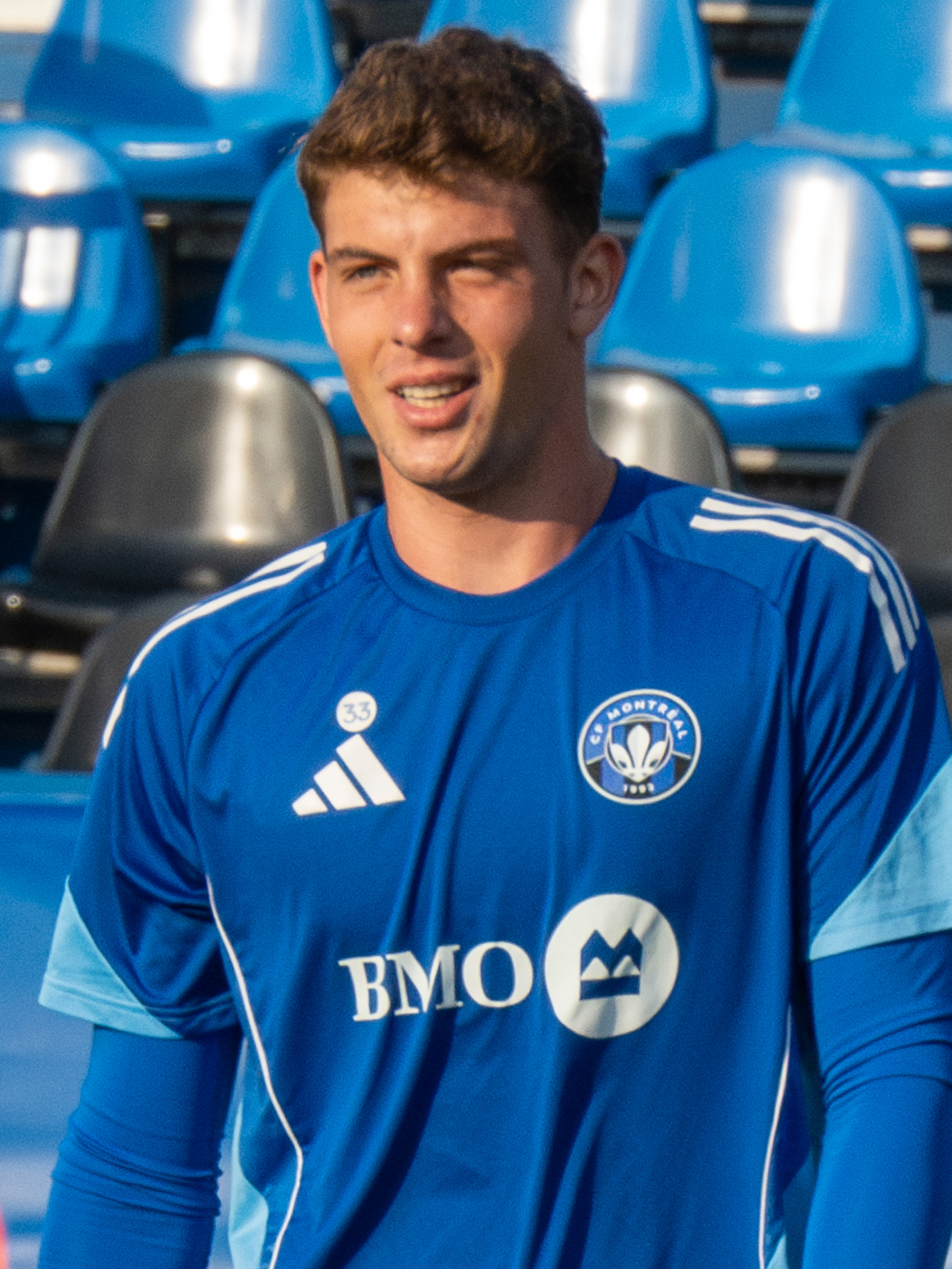
- Gazdov in 2025

Personal information
- Date of birth: September 11, 2003 (age 23)
- Place of birth: North Vancouver, British Columbia, Canada
- Height: 1.91 m (6 ft 3 in)
- Position: Goalkeeper

Team information
- Current team: CF Montréal

Youth career
- North Vancouver FC
- Mountain United FC
- 2017–2020: Vancouver Whitecaps FC
- 2020–2022: Pacific FC
- 2020–2022: → 1. FC Nürnberg (loan)

Senior career*
Years	Team	Apps	(Gls)
2022–2025	Pacific FC	41	(0)
2025–	CF Montréal	0	(0)
2025	→ Valour FC (loan)	7	(0)
2026	→ FC St. Pauli II (loan)	8	(0)
2026	→ FC St. Pauli (loan)	0	(0)
- * Club domestic league appearances and goals as of May 16, 2026

Emil Gazdov (Bulgarian: Емил Газдов; born September 11, 2003) is a Canadian professional soccer player who plays as a goalkeeper for Major League Soccer club CF Montréal.

== Early life ==
Gazdov began playing youth soccer with North Vancouver FC, before later joining Mountain United FC. In August 2017, he joined the Vancouver Whitecaps Residency Academy, where he played for three years before leaving to sign a professional contract. He later spent time with the U19 side of German club 1. FC Nürnberg, after being loaned following signing his first professional contract with Pacific FC.

== Career ==
=== Pacific FC ===
In March 2020, Gazdov began training with Canadian Premier League club Pacific FC. On June 30, 2020, he signed his first professional contract with Pacific FC of the Canadian Premier League. After not appearing in any matchday squads in the COVID-19 shortened 2020 season as the third-choice goalkeeper, Gazdov was sent on a two-year loan in October to the U19 side of German club 1. FC Nürnberg. He returned to Pacific FC in 2022 to serve as the backup goalkeeper. He made his professional debut on July 30, 2022, in a 2–1 victory over Valour FC. Following the departure of Callum Irving following the 2022 season, Gazdov became the team's first choice goalkeeper ahead of the 2023 season. In April 2023, he signed an additional two-year extension with the club, with a club option for 2026. After beginning the season as the starting keeper, midway through the season, he became the backup, before soon regaining his spot as the starter. On May 1, 2024, he was substitute into the 2024 Canadian Championship first round match against TSS FC Rovers just prior to the beginning of the penalty shootout, making two saves to help Pacific advance to the next round. In 2024, he led the league with nine clean sheets. At the end of the 2024 season, Gazdov was nominated for the Canadian Premier League's Best Canadian Under-21 Player and the Goalkeeper of the Year awards. He ultimately won the Goalkeeper of the Year award.

=== CF Montréal ===
In February 2025, Gazdov transferred to CF Montréal in Major League Soccer, signing a two-year contract with club options for the 2027 and 2028 seasons.

==== Loans ====
In August 2025, Gazdov was sent on loan to Valour FC of the Canadian Premier League for the remainder of 2025. He made his debut for Valour on August 17, 2025, keeping a clean sheet in a 0–0 draw against York United FC.

In January 2026, Gazdov was loaned to Bundesliga club FC St. Pauli, through June 2026, with St. Pauli holding a purchase option as well.

== Personal life ==
Gazdov is of Bulgarian descent.

== Career statistics ==
As of October 27, 2025

Appearances and goals by club, season and competition
Club	Season	League			Playoffs		National cup		Continental		Other		Total	
Club	Season	Division	Apps	Goals	Apps	Goals	Apps	Goals	Apps	Goals	Apps	Goals	Apps	Goals
Pacific FC	2022	Canadian Premier League	2	0	0	0	0	0	0	0	–		2	0
Pacific FC	2023	Canadian Premier League	18	0	3	0	2	0	–		–		23	0
Pacific FC	2024	Canadian Premier League	21	0	0	0	3	0	–		–		24	0
Pacific FC	Total		41	0	3	0	5	0	0	0	0	0	49	0
CF Montréal	2025	Major League Soccer	0	0	–		0	0	–		0	0	0	0
Valour FC (loan)	2025	Canadian Premier League	7	0	–		0	0	–		–		7	0
Career total			48	0	3	0	5	0	0	0	56	0		
