= Djenairo Daniels =

Surinamese association football player

Personal information
- Full name: Djenairo Gillian Noell Daniels
- Date of birth: 7 January 2002 (age 24)
- Place of birth: Spijkenisse, Netherlands
- Height: 1.90 m (6 ft 3 in)
- Position: Forward

Team information
- Current team: Kilmarnock
- Number: 29

Youth career
- 2012–2018: Almere City
- 2018–2020: PSV
- 2021–2022: Utrecht
- 2021–2022: → Sassuolo (loan)

Senior career*
Years	Team	Apps	(Gls)
2020–2021	Jong PSV	3	(1)
2021–2022	Jong Utrecht	7	(0)
2021–2022	→ Sassuolo (loan)	0	(0)
2022–2023	Pacific FC	44	(6)
2024	Leixões	14	(0)
2024	Fram	12	(2)
2025	Cork City	12	(5)
2025–	Kilmarnock	7	(2)

International career^{‡}
2019	Netherlands U17	5	(0)
2019	Netherlands U18	3	(0)
2025–	Suriname	1	(0)
- * Club domestic league appearances and goals as of 22:02, 8 October 2025 (UTC) ‡ National team caps and goals as of 23:57, 10 October 2025

Djenairo Gillian Noell Daniels (born 7 January 2002) is a professional footballer who plays as a forward for Scottish Premiership club Kilmarnock. Born in the Netherlands, he plays for the Suriname national team.

== Early life ==
At age 11, he had a trial with the youth system of PSV Eindhoven, but then joined the youth system of Almere City, where he played for the next six years. In July 2018, he joined the youth system of PSV Eindhoven at the age of sixteen, signing a three-year contract.

== Club career ==
He made his senior debut for PSV's second team Jong PSV in the second tier Eerste Divisie on 29 August 2020 against Excelsior Rotterdam. He scored his first professional goal on 2 October 2020 against SC Telstar. After not getting any opportunities with the first team, he was allowed to leave the club in January 2021.

In January 2021, he signed a contract with FC Utrecht until 2023 with an option for a further season, where he would initially join the second team Jong Utrecht. In September 2021, he went on loan to Italian club Sassuolo, with an option to purchase him permanently at the conclusion of the loan. He was assigned to the Sassuolo U19 squad. In February 2022, his loan was terminated and he also terminated his contract with Utrecht by mutual consent.

In February 2022, he signed with Canadian Premier League club Pacific FC. Daniels scored his first goal for Pacific on 30 June, netting the opener in an eventual 3–3 draw with Cavalry FC. After the season, he re-signed with the club for the 2023 season. On 21 July, he was injured in a match against Forge FC, being stretchered out and taken to hospital later being diagnosed with a concussion. After the 2023 season, he departed the club.

In February 2024, Daniels joined Liga Portugal 2 club Leixões.

He spent the second half of 2024 playing for Icelandic side Fram, scoring two goals in 12 games for the club.

On 21 April 2025, Daniels signed for League of Ireland Premier Division club Cork City on a short-term deal until July. He scored five goals in 12 appearances during his short time with the club.

On 7 July 2025, he signed for Scottish Premiership club Kilmarnock on a two-year contract.

== International career ==
Born in the Netherlands, Daniels is of Surinamese descent. He was named to the Netherlands U17 roster for the 2019 UEFA European Under-17 Championship and 2019 FIFA U-17 World Cup. He also was named to the Netherlands U18 in a four nations mini-tournament in 2019.

In August 2025, Daniels began filing the required paperwork to play for Suriname at international level. On 30 September 2025, he was called up to the national team for the first time ahead of their 2026 FIFA World Cup qualification matches against Guatemala and Panama. He made his debut for Suriname, during the 1–1 draw against Guatemala on 10 October 2025, as a second-half substitute, but he had to be substituted out himself due to injury.

== Career statistics ==
=== Club ===
As of match played on 4 October 2025

Appearances and goals by club, season and competition
Club	Season	League			National cup (Note: Includes Canadian Championship)		League cup (Note: Includes Scottish League Cup)		Continental		Other		Total	
Club	Season	Division	Apps	Goals	Apps	Goals	Apps	Goals	Apps	Goals	Apps	Goals	Apps	Goals
Jong PSV	2020–21	Eerste Divisie	3	1	—		—		—		—		3	1
Jong Utrecht	2020–21	Eerste Divisie	7	0	—		—		—		—		7	0
Pacific	2022	Canadian Premier League	22	3	1	0	—		4 (Note: Appearances in the CONCACAF League)	0	1 (Note: Appearance in the 2022 Canadian Premier League Playoffs)	0	28	3
Pacific	2023	Canadian Premier League	22	3	2	0	—		—		2 (Note: Appearances in the 2023 Canadian Premier League Playoffs)	0	26	3
Pacific	Total		44	6	3	0	—		4	0	3	0	54	6
Leixões	2023–24	Liga Portugal 2	14	0	0	0	—		—		—		14	3
Fram	2024	Besta deild karla	12	2	0	0	—		—		—		12	2
Cork City	2025	LOI Premier Division	12	5	—		—		—		—		12	5
Kilmarnock	2025–26	Scottish Premiership	7	2	0	0	6	2	—		—		13	4
Kilmarnock	2026–27	Scottish Premiership	0	0	0	0	0	0	—		—		0	0
Kilmarnock	Total		7	2	0	0	6	2	—		—		13	4
Career total			99	16	3	0	6	2	4	0	3	0	115	18

=== International ===
As of match played 10 October 2025

Appearances and goals by national team and year
National team	Year	Apps	Goals
Suriname	2025	1	0
Total		1	0
