= Kunle Dada-Luke =

Canadian soccer player (born 2000)

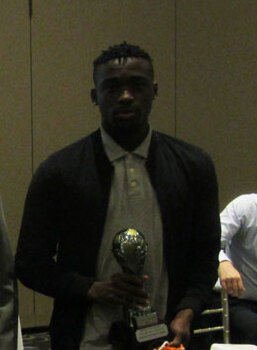
- Dada-Luke receives L1O Young Player of the Year award in 2018

Personal information
- Full name: Olakunle Olumide Dada-Luke
- Date of birth: January 12, 2000 (age 26)
- Place of birth: Mississauga, Ontario, Canada
- Height: 6 ft 0 in (1.83 m)
- Positions: Full-back; winger

Youth career
- 2003–2013: West Toronto SC
- 2013–2018: Toronto FC

Senior career*
Years	Team	Apps	(Gls)
2016–2018	Toronto FC III	25	(6)
2018	Toronto FC II	5	(0)
2019	Helsingør	0	(0)
2020	Atlético Ottawa	0	(0)
2021–2024	Pacific FC	95	(1)
2025	Vancouver FC	23	(0)

International career
2017	Canada U17	2	(0)
- * Club domestic league appearances and goals as of October 22, 2025

Olakunle Olumide Dada-Luke (born January 12, 2000) is a Canadian professional soccer player who plays as a full-back.

== Early life ==
Dada-Luke began playing youth soccer with West Toronto SC at age of three. After ten years with West Toronto, he joined the Toronto FC Academy in 2013. On March 15, 2017, he scored in a 1–1 draw at the Viareggio Cup against the Juventus academy team.

== Club career ==
From 2016 to 2018, he played with Toronto FC III in League1 Ontario. In 2018, he was named co-Young Player of the Year and was named to the league 2nd all-star team.

In 2018, he began playing for Toronto FC II in the USL, making five total appearances.

In July 2019, Dada-Luke joined Danish club FC Helsingør on a three-year contract after a successful trial. While at Helsingør, he converted from playing winger to becoming a defender at right-back. On January 14, 2020, they announced he had left the club, after not making any appearances.

In March 2020, he joined Atlético Ottawa in the Canadian Premier League . However, he was unable to travel to Prince Edward Island for the shortened 2020 season due to an ankle injury, and never appeared for the club as a result.

In March 2021, Dada-Luke signed with Pacific FC. He recorded two assists in his debut season and also caused the winning goal in the semi-final against Cavalry FC (which was ultimately ruled an own goal), en route to winning the CPL title that season. On September 3, 2022, he scored his first professional goal against York United FC, which helped him earn CPL Team of the Week honours for the second time that season. In January 2023, he re-signed with the club for another season, with an option for 2024. In January 2024, the club picked up his option for the 2024 season.

In March 2025, he signed with Vancouver FC in the Canadian Premier League.

== International career ==
Dada-Luke was born in Canada and is of Nigerian descent. In October 2014, he made his debut in the Canadian youth program at an identification camp for the Canada U15 team. He was named to the roster for the 2017 CONCACAF U-17 Championship, where he made two appearances.

== Career statistics ==
As of October 23, 2025

Club	Season	League			Playoffs		Domestic Cup		League Cup		Continental		Total	
Club	Season	Division	Apps	Goals	Apps	Goals	Apps	Goals	Apps	Goals	Apps	Goals	Apps	Goals
Toronto FC III	2016	League1 Ontario	1	0	—		—		0	0	—		1	0
Toronto FC III	2017	League1 Ontario	11	0	—		—		1	0	—		12	0
Toronto FC III	2018	League1 Ontario	13	6	—		—		4	3	—		17	9
Toronto FC III	Total		25	6	0	0	0	0	5	3	0	0	30	9
Toronto FC II	2018	USL	5	0	—		—		—		—		5	0
FC Helsingør	2019–20	Danish 2nd Division	0	0	—		0	0	—		—		0	0
Atlético Ottawa	2020	Canadian Premier League	0	0	—		—		—		—		0	0
Pacific FC	2021	Canadian Premier League	19	0	2	0	2	0	—		—		23	0
Pacific FC	2022	Canadian Premier League	23	1	2	0	1	0	—		4	0	30	1
Pacific FC	2023	Canadian Premier League	27	0	2	0	3	0	—		—		32	0
Pacific FC	2024	Canadian Premier League	26	0	1	0	5	0	—		—		32	0
Pacific FC	Total		95	1	7	0	11	0	0	0	4	0	117	1
Vancouver FC	2025	Canadian Premier League	23	0	—		6	0	—		—		29	0
Career total			148	7	7	0	17	0	5	3	4	0	181	10

== Honours ==
Pacific FC

- Canadian Premier League: 2021
