= Kamron Habibullah =

Canadian soccer player (born 2003)

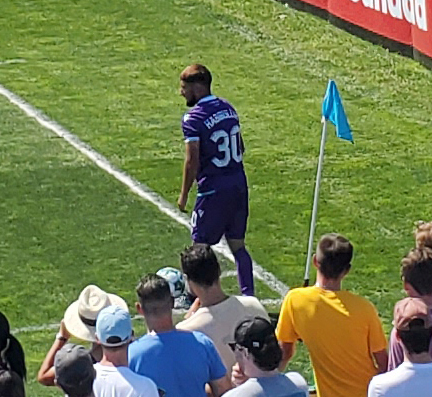
- Habibullah with Pacific FC in 2022

Personal information
- Date of birth: October 23, 2003 (age 23)
- Place of birth: Tashkent, Uzbekistan
- Height: 1.72 m (5 ft 8 in)
- Position: Forward

Team information
- Current team: Atlético Ottawa

Youth career
- South Burnaby Metro SC
- Burnaby Selects
- Mountain United FC
- 2016–2021: Vancouver Whitecaps FC

Senior career*
Years	Team	Apps	(Gls)
2021–2023	Vancouver Whitecaps FC	3	(0)
2022	→ Pacific FC (loan)	14	(0)
2023	→ Whitecaps FC 2 (loan)	18	(4)
2024	Sporting Kansas City II	26	(11)
2025	Sandviken	1	(0)
2026–	Atlético Ottawa	25	(3)

International career
2019	Canada U17	8	(3)
2022	Canada U20	5	(2)
- * Club domestic league appearances and goals as of November 2, 2026

Kamron Habibullah (Dari: کامرون حبیب الله, Uzbek: Kamron Habibulloh; born October 23, 2003) is a professional soccer who plays as a forward for Canadian Premier League club Atlético Ottawa. Born in Uzbekistan, he has represented Canada at youth level.

== Early life ==
Habibullah was born in Tashkent, Uzbekistan to Afghan Uzbek parents and emigrated to British Columbia, Canada with his family at the age of two. He played youth soccer at age seven with South Burnaby Metro SC, and later played with Burnaby Selects, and Mountain United FC. He joined the Whitecaps academy system in 2016 at the age of 12. He went on to score 21 goals in 58 appearances from U-16 to U-19, netting four goals at the 2019 Generation Adidas Cup and scoring the winning goal against Real Madrid Academy.

== Club career ==
=== Vancouver Whitecaps ===
After spending the duration of the preseason with the first team, it was announced on April 23, 2021, that Vancouver Whitecaps FC would be signing Habibullah to a multi-year MLS homegrown contract. He made his first team debut the following week, replacing Caio Alexandre in the 88th minute of a 1–0 loss to the Colorado Rapids. In March 2022, Habibullah went on loan with Canadian Premier League side Pacific FC. He made his debut in Pacific's season-opener against Forge FC on April 10. After the 2023 season, Habibullah's contract option for the 2024 season would be declined by the Whitecaps, ending his time with the club.

=== Sporting Kansas City ===
In March 2024, he signed with Sporting Kansas City II in MLS Next Pro. He made his debut on March 24 against Ventura County FC. On April 7, 2024, he scored a hat trick (including his first goal for the club) in a 5-3 victory over Colorado Rapids 2.

=== Sandviken ===
In March 2025, Habibullah signed with Superettan club Sandviken on a three year contract. Less than two weeks after his arrival, Habibullah suffered a serious injury during a training match, sustaining a fractured fibula and severe ankle damage, which ruled him out for an extended period.

=== Atlético Ottawa ===
In February 2026, he signed a two-year contract with an option for 2028, with Canadian Premier League club Atlético Ottawa.

== International career ==
His parents' Afghan link and his Uzbek ancestry, himself belonging to the Uzbek Afghan minority, means Kamron is available to play for either Canada, Afghanistan and Uzbekistan.

Habibullah was first called up to a Canada U17 national camp in March 2019 by head coach Andrew Olivieri, in preparation for the 2019 FIFA U-17 World Cup. He went on to score three goals in qualifying and appeared three times for Canada at the U-17 World Cup finals.

In April 2022, Habibullah was called up to the Canadian Under-20 side for two friendly matches against Costa Rica. He scored a goal in the first friendly on April 15. In June 2022, he was officially called up by the Canadian U-20 team for the 2022 CONCACAF U-20 Championship.

== Career statistics ==
As of November 7, 2024

Appearances and goals by club, season and competition
Club	Season	League			Playoffs		National Cup		Continental		Total	
Club	Season	Division	Apps	Goals	Apps	Goals	Apps	Goals	Apps	Goals	Apps	Goals
Vancouver Whitecaps FC	2021	Major League Soccer	3	0	0	0	0	0	–		3	0
Pacific FC (loan)	2022	Canadian Premier League	14	0	2	0	0	0	0	0	16	0
Whitecaps FC 2 (loan)	2023	MLS Next Pro	18	4	0	0	—		—		18	4
Sporting Kansas City II	2024	MLS Next Pro	26	11	0	0	—		—		26	11
Sandviken	2025	Superettan	0	0	0	0	0	0	0	0	0	
Career total			61	15	2	0	0	0	0	0	63	15
