= Matteo Polisi =

Canadian soccer player (born 1998)

Personal information
- Full name: Matteo Mario Polisi
- Date of birth: April 15, 1998 (age 28)
- Place of birth: Coquitlam, British Columbia, Canada
- Height: 1.78 m (5 ft 10 in)
- Position: Midfielder

Youth career
- 2002–2011: Coquitlam Metro-Ford SC
- 2011–2013: Vancouver Whitecaps FC
- 2013–2016: Coquitlam Metro-Ford SC
- 2016–2017: Portland Timbers

College career
Years	Team	Apps	(Gls)
2017–2019	Simon Fraser Clan	52	(36)

Senior career*
Years	Team	Apps	(Gls)
2017–2019	TSS FC Rovers	39	(11)
2021–2022	Pacific FC	36	(3)
2023	TSS FC Rovers	8	(1)
2023–2024	Anagennisi Epanomi		
2024	TSS FC Rovers	7	(2)
- * Club domestic league appearances and goals as of June 21, 2024

Matteo Mario Polisi (born April 15, 1998) is a Canadian professional soccer player.

== Early life ==
Polisi began playing soccer at age four with Coquitlam Metro-Ford SC, where he played from 2002 until 2011. In 2008 and 2009, he had training stints with the youth teams of Belgian club Standard Liège. He also played for the BC provincial team at U13 level, serving as team captain. In September 2011, he joined the Vancouver Whitecaps Academy. In 2013, after being released by the Whitecaps, he returned to Coquitlam Metro-Ford SC, where he was named a ‘Player of Distinction’ by the Canadian Soccer Association in 2014, and with whom he won the 2015 BC Provincial U-15 Cup, after scoring a hat-trick in the final. In the spring of 2016, he joined the youth system of the Portland Timbers. In late 2016 and early 2017, he had trials in Europe with English clubs Birmingham City and Derby County, and German club FC Nürnberg.

== University career ==
In 2017, he began attending Simon Fraser University, where he played for the men's soccer team. He made his debut on August 31, 2017, scoring two goals against the University of Mary Marauders. In his freshman season, he was named the GNAC Freshman of the Year and was named a GNAC First-Team All-Star. On October 6, 2018, he scored a hat trick against the Seattle Pacific Falcons. After his sophomore season, he was named a GNAC First Team All-Star again, as well as an All-West Region First Team All-Star, and was named the Div. II West Region Player of the Year. On October 3, 2019, he scored another hat trick against the Saint Martin's Saints. After his third season, he was named a GNAC First Team All-Star for the third time and was named to the United Soccer Coaches’ NCAA Div. II All-American second team. Over his time at Simon Fraser, he scored 36 goals and added 18 assists in 52 matches. He declared for the 2021 MLS SuperDraft, but was ultimately not selected.

== Club career ==
In 2017, Polisi joined the TSS FC Rovers in the Premier Development League. In 2017, he scored three goals in 12 appearances. In 2018, he scored two goals in 14 appearances and led the team with five assists. In 2019, he led the team in scoring with six goals in 13 appearances. He also played at the amateur level with Rino's Tigers in the Vancouver Metro Soccer League.

In February 2021, Polisi signed his first professional contract with Canadian Premier League side Pacific FC. He scored his first professional goal on July 7 against York United. With Pacific, he won the 2021 CPL title. He re-signed with the club for the 2022 season. At the conclusion of the season, Polisi departed the club. He then briefly joined senior amateur side BB5 United in the Vancouver Metro Soccer League for the remainder of their season where he won a League Title, League Cup and Provincial Cup with them.

In April 2023, he returned to the TSS FC Rovers, now in League1 British Columbia. On April 19, 2023, he scored two goals in a 3-1 upset victory over Canadian Premier League club Valour FC (with whom he had trialed with during the 2023 pre-season, including scoring for them in a pre-season match against Vancouver FC) in the first round of the 2023 Canadian Championship.

Later in 2023, he signed with Greek Gamma Ethniki side Anagennisi Epanomi on a season-long deal, which includes a clause that allows him to transfer to a new club in the winter transfer window, if a club in a higher division presents an offer. In January 2024, he departed the club, after having made ten total appearances.

In April 2024, he returned to the TSS FC Rovers.

== Personal ==
He is the younger brother of Marcello Polisi, who is also a professional soccer player.

== Career statistics ==
As of June 21, 2024

Club	Season	League			Playoffs		Domestic Cup		Continental		Total	
Club	Season	Division	Apps	Goals	Apps	Goals	Apps	Goals	Apps	Goals	Apps	Goals
TSS FC Rovers	2017	Premier Development League	12	3	–		–		–		12	3
TSS FC Rovers	2018	Premier Development League	14	2	–		–		–		14	2
TSS FC Rovers	2019	USL League Two	13	6	–		–		–		13	6
TSS FC Rovers	Total		39	11	0	0	0	0	0	0	39	11
Pacific FC	2021	Canadian Premier League	21	3	1	0	0	0	–		22	3
Pacific FC	2022	Canadian Premier League	15	0	0	0	0	0	2	0	17	0
Pacific FC	Total		36	3	1	0	0	0	2	0	39	3
TSS FC Rovers	2023	League1 British Columbia	8	1	1	0	2	2	–		11	3
TSS FC Rovers	2024	League1 British Columbia	7	2	0	0	1	0	–		8	2
TSS FC Rovers	Total		15	3	1	0	3	2	0	0	19	5
Career total			90	17	2	0	3	2	2	0	97	19

== Honours ==
=== Club ===
Pacific FC

- Canadian Premier League: 2021
