= Abdou Samaké =

Malian professional footballer (born 1996)

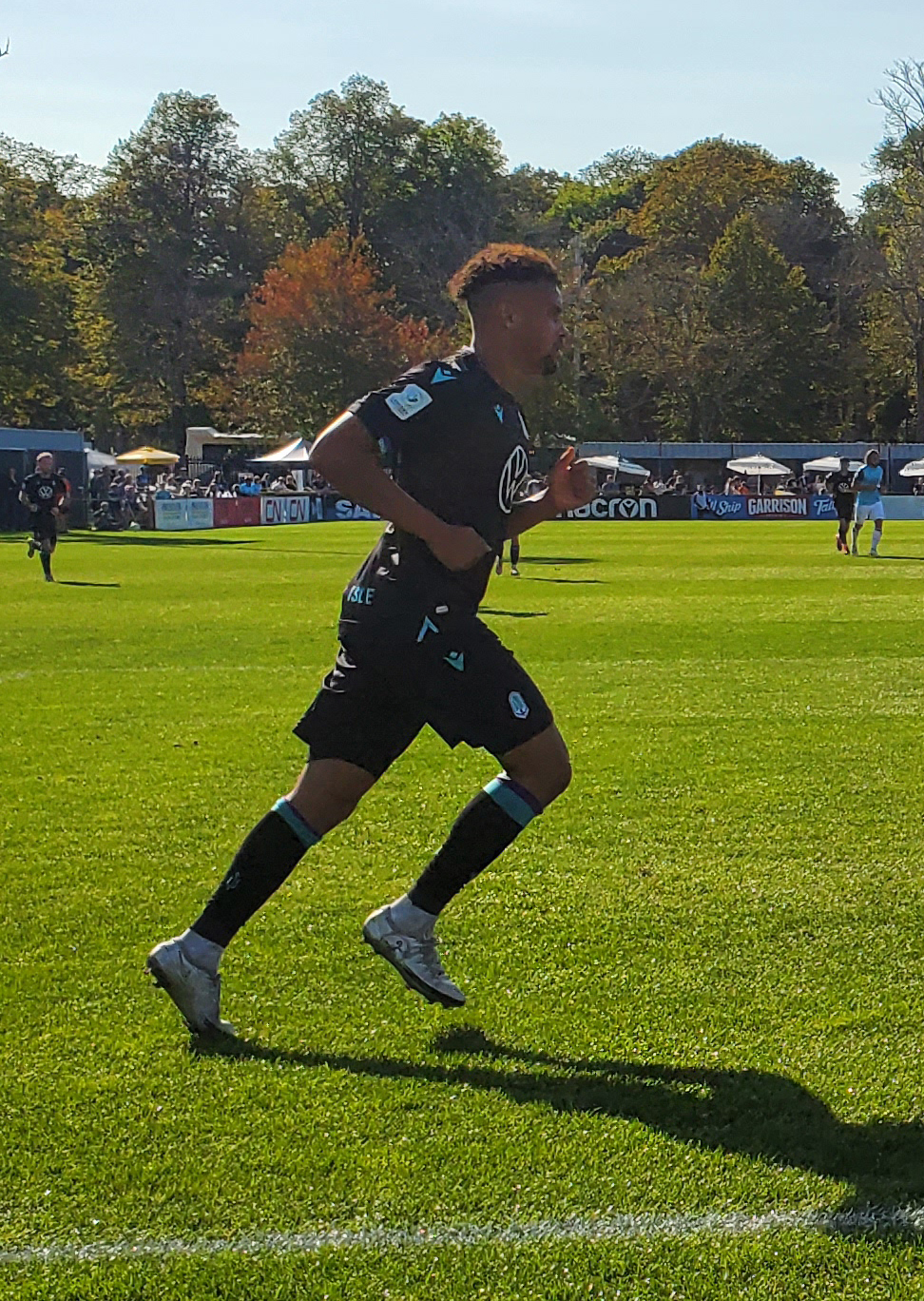
- Samake with Pacific FC in 2021

Personal information
- Full name: Abdoulaye Gilbert Samaké
- Date of birth: 7 October 1996 (age 30)
- Place of birth: Bamako, Mali
- Height: 1.86 m (6 ft 1 in)
- Position: Defender

Team information
- Current team: Nyköpings BIS

Youth career
- Ottawa Gloucester Hornets SC
- Ottawa South United
- Montreal Impact

College career
Years	Team	Apps	(Gls)
2016–2019	Michigan Wolverines	54	(0)

Senior career*
Years	Team	Apps	(Gls)
2015	FC Montreal	0	(0)
2016	Chicago Fire U23	6	(0)
2017–2018	Chicago FC United	20	(2)
2019	AFC Ann Arbor	2	(0)
2020–2022	Pacific FC	46	(0)
2023–2024	Valour FC	20	(1)
2024	Glacis United	1	(0)
2025–	Nyköpings BIS	0	(0)
- * Club domestic league appearances and goals as of 25 August 2024

Abdoulaye Gilbert Samaké (born 7 October 1996) is a Malian professional footballer who plays as a defender for Swedish side Nyköpings BIS.

== Early life ==
Samaké was born in Bamako, Mali, and moved to Canada at the age of six. He initially moved to Montreal, but soon after moved to Ottawa, where he was raised. Samaké began playing youth soccer with the Gloucester Hornets before joining Ottawa South United. Afterwards, he joined the Montreal Impact Academy.

== College career ==
In February 2016, he committed to join Michigan University and play for the men's soccer team in the fall. He missed his entire freshman season in 2016 due to injury. He made his debut on August 25, 2017, against the William & Mary Tribe. He was a three-time Academic All-Big Ten selection from 2017 to 2019 and a two-time University of Michigan Athletic Academic Achievement selection in 2017 and 2018. In his senior season, he was named to the Big Ten Conference All-Tournament Team and was named Michigan's Club Man of the Year. He was able to graduate a semester early in January 2020, completing his degree in the School of Literature, Science and the Arts program.

== Club career ==
In July 2015, Samaké signed with the Impact's reserve side, FC Montreal, in the USL.

In 2016, he played with the Chicago Fire U23 in the Premier Development League.

In 2017 and 2018, he played in the Premier Development League with Chicago FC United (who replaced the Fire U23, who chose to depart the league, with many of the players and staff moving on to United).

In 2019, Samaké spent the season with AFC Ann Arbor of the National Premier Soccer League.

In February 2020, he signed with Pacific FC on the Canadian Premier League. In 2021, he won the CPL title with Pacific, although he did not play in the championship final due to injury suffered in the semi-final. In February 2022, he re-signed with the club for another season. In August 2022, he was named to the CPL Team of the Week. After the 2022 season, he departed the club.

In December 2022, he joined Valour FC for the 2023 season. On May 13, 2023, he scored his first CPL goal against Forge FC. In June 2024, he terminated his contract with the club by mutual consent.

After he left Valour, he joined Gibraltar Football League club Glacis United.

In July 2025, he signed with Nyköpings BIS in the Swedish fourth-tier Division 2.

== Personal life ==
In 2023, Samaké founded Inner City Youth Alive in Winnipeg, an organization for children from the ages of six to eighteen, where they can come after school, get a meal, be with friends, and play games.

== Career statistics ==
As of June 9, 2024

Club statistics
Club	Season	League			Playoffs		Domestic Cup		Continental		Total	
Club	Season	Division	Apps	Goals	Apps	Goals	Apps	Goals	Apps	Goals	Apps	Goals
FC Montreal	2015	USL	0	0	—		—		—		0	0
Chicago Fire U23	2016	Premier Development League	6	0	—		—		—		6	0
Chicago FC United	2017	Premier Development League	10	1	—		2	0	—		12	1
Chicago FC United	2018	Premier Development League	10	1	0	0	—		—		10	1
Chicago FC United	Total		20	2	0	0	2	0	0	0	22	2
AFC Ann Arbor	2019	National Premier Soccer League	2	0	0	0	0	0	—		2	0
Pacific FC	2020	Canadian Premier League	3	0	—		—		—		3	0
Pacific FC	2021	Canadian Premier League	24	0	1	0	3	0	—		28	0
Pacific FC	2022	Canadian Premier League	19	0	1	0	1	0	2	0	23	0
Pacific FC	Total		46	0	2	0	4	0	2	0	54	0
Valour FC	2023	Canadian Premier League	17	1	—		1	0	—		18	1
Valour FC	2024	Canadian Premier League	3	0	—		1	0	—		4	0
Valour FC	Total		20	1	0	0	2	0	0	0	22	1
Career total			94	3	2	0	7	0	2	0	106	3

== Honours ==
=== Club ===
Pacific FC

- Canadian Premier League: 2021
