= Josh Heard =

Welsh footballer (born 1994)

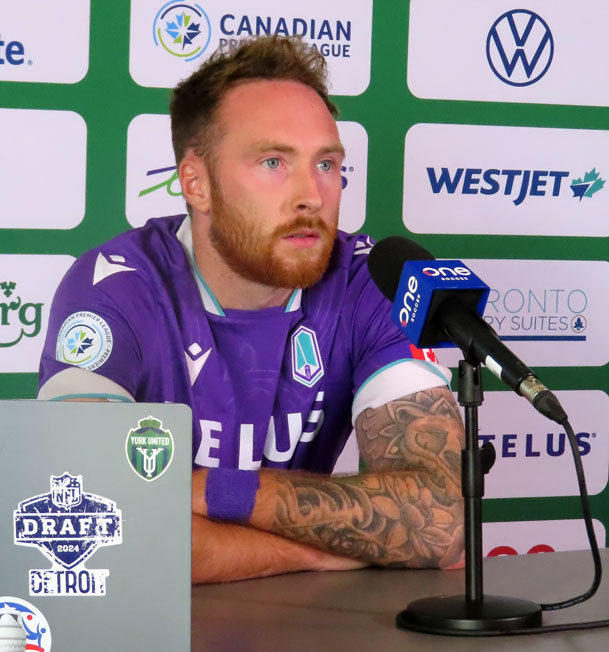
- Heard in 2025

Personal information
- Full name: Joshua David Heard
- Date of birth: 29 November 1994 (age 31)
- Place of birth: Cardiff, Wales
- Height: 1.75 m (5 ft 9 in)
- Position: Attacking midfielder

Team information
- Current team: Pacific FC
- Number: 11

Youth career
- Lakehill SA
- Victoria Metro
- Victoria Highlanders

College career
Years	Team	Apps	(Gls)
2012–2015	Washington Huskies	74	(13)

Senior career*
Years	Team	Apps	(Gls)
2011–2012	Victoria Highlanders	17	(3)
2013	North Sound SeaWolves	1	(0)
2013	Victoria Highlanders		
2014	Puget Sound Gunners	3	(0)
2016–2017	Bethlehem Steel	37	(2)
2018–2020	Real Monarchs	38	(3)
2019–2020	→ Pinzgau Saalfelden (loan)	18	(1)
2020–2026	Pacific FC	136	(18)
- * Club domestic league appearances and goals as of 25 October 2026

Joshua David Heard (born 29 November 1994) is a retired Welsh professional footballer who played as an attacking midfielder for and captained Pacific FC of the Canadian Premier League.

== Early life ==
Heard was born in Cardiff, Wales and moved to Victoria, Canada when he was three. Heard played youth soccer with Lakehill Soccer Association. He also played for Victoria Metro and the Victoria Highlanders. He had been invited to train with the Vancouver Whitecaps Academy, but he elected to attend college and play college soccer instead.

== College career ==
In 2012, Heard began attending the University of Washington, where he played for the men's soccer team. He had been recruited to the school after impressing the team's coaching staff when they saw him playing in a youth match, which they were attending to watch two members of the opposing team who had committed to joining Washington. He made his debut on August 24, 2012 against the Gonzaga Bulldogs. On September 22, 2013, he scored his first collegiate goal against the Georgia State Panthers. On October 8, 2013, he scored a brace in a 2-0 victory over the Seattle Redhawks. In 2013, Washington won the 2013 Pac-12 title and advance to the Elite Eight of the NCAA National Tournament. In his senior season, he was named an Honourable Mention for the All-Pac 12 All-Star Teams. After the season, he was invited to the MLS Player Combine ahead of the 2016 MLS SuperDraft, however, he was not able to attend due to injury. Over his time with Washington, he scored 13 goals and added eight assists in 74 games.

== Club career ==
In 2011 and 2012, Heard played with the Victoria Highlanders in the Premier Development League. In 2013, he signed with the North Sound SeaWolves, before returning to the Highlanders, helping them reach the PDL Final Four in 2013. In 2014, he signed with the newly renamed Puget Sound Gunners (who changed their name from the North Sound SeaWovles) again.

In January 2016, Heard was selected 71st overall in the 2016 MLS SuperDraft by Vancouver Whitecaps FC. However, he did not sign with the Whitecaps.

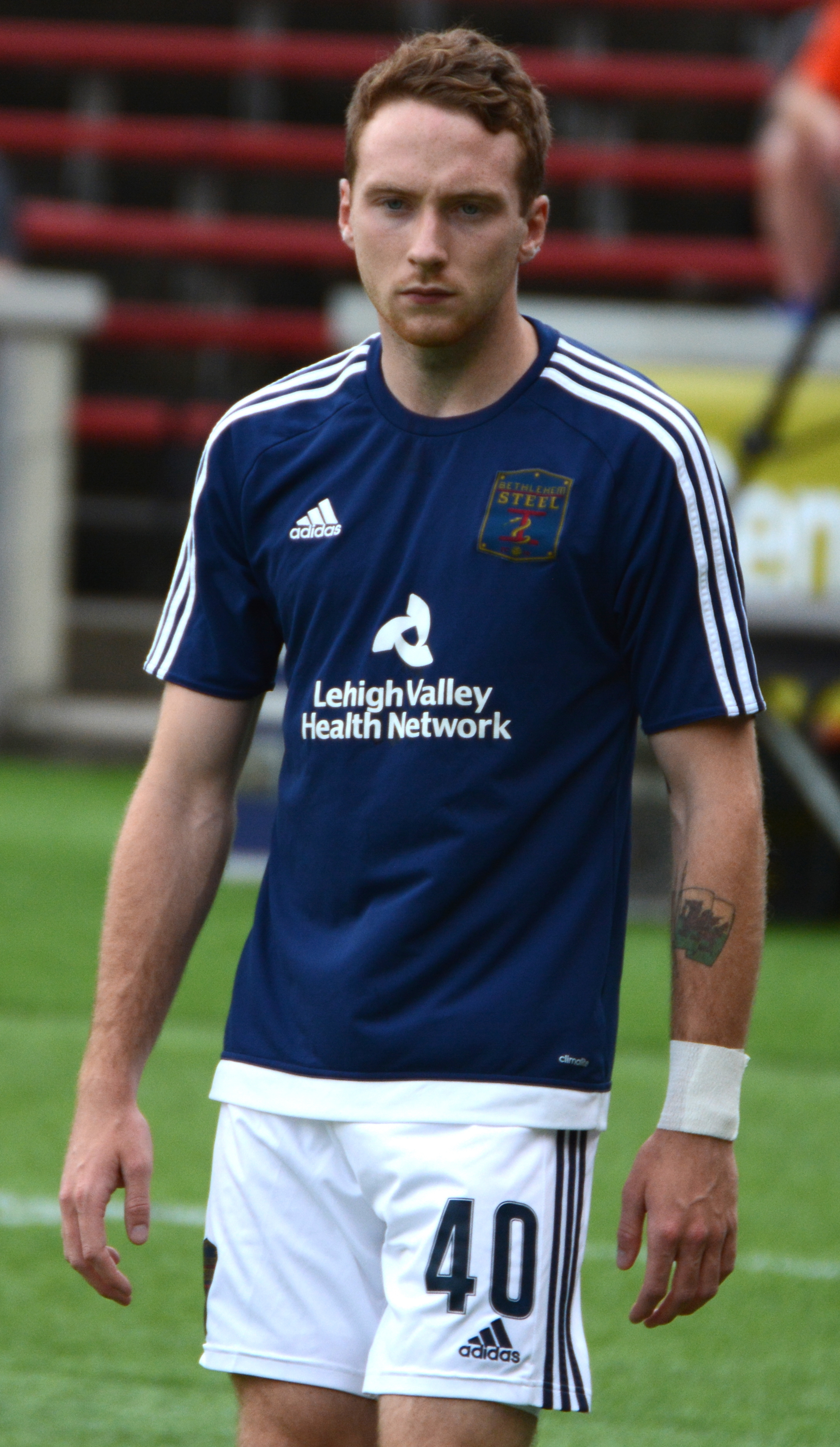
Heard with Bethlehem Steel in 2017

In late January 2016, he signed a professional contract with USL club Bethlehem Steel FC. He made his debut on April 11, 2016 against New York Red Bulls II. He scored his first goal on July 7, 2016 against Toronto FC II. He departed the club after the 2017 season, upon the expiry of his contract.

In February 2018, he signed with the Real Monarchs of the USL. He scored his first goal on May 19, 2018 against the Las Vegas Lights. After the season, the club picked up his option for the following season. In July 2019, he was sent on a one year loan to Austrian club FC Pinzgau Saalfelden until July 2020. With Pinzgau, they qualified for the promotion playoff series, but it was cancelled due to the COVID-19 pandemic in March 2020. Upon the conclusion of his loan, he departed the Monarchs, mutually terminating the deal, after being unable to return to the United States due to COVID-19 pandemic travel restrictions.

On July 31, 2020, he signed with Pacific FC of the Canadian Premier League. On August 15, he made his debut for Pacific against the HFX Wanderers. He won the 2021 CPL Championship with Pacific. In January 2022, he re-signed with the club for an additional season. On August 2, 2022, he scored two goals in a 6-0 CONCACAF League victory over Jamaican club Waterhouse FC to help Pacific advance to the Round of 16. In November 2022, it was announced that he would return to the club for the 2023 season, and he was named team captain in March 2023. In January 2024, Pacific announced that Heard would return for the 2024 season. In December 2024, he signed a two-year extension with the club.

On October 21, 2026 Heard announced that he will retire after the completion of the 2026 Canadian Premier League season. He retired as Pacific FC's appearance leader with 162 matches with one match remaining of the regular season (Pacific FC had failed to make the playoffs).

== Career statistics ==
As of October 23, 2025

Club	Season	League			Playoffs		Domestic Cup		Continental		Total	
Club	Season	Division	Apps	Goals	Apps	Goals	Apps	Goals	Apps	Goals	Apps	Goals
Bethlehem Steel FC	2016	USL	22	2	—		—		—		22	2
Bethlehem Steel FC	2017	USL	15	0	1	0	—		—		16	0
Bethlehem Steel FC	Total		37	2	1	0	0	0	0	0	38	2
Real Monarchs	2018	USL	24	1	0	0	—		—		24	1
Real Monarchs	2019	USL Championship	14	2	0	0	—		—		14	2
Real Monarchs	Total		38	3	1	0	0	0	0	0	39	3
Pinzgau Saalfelden (loan)	2019–20	Austrian Regionalliga	18	1	—		—		—		18	1
Pacific FC	2020	Canadian Premier League	5	1	—		—		—		5	1
Pacific FC	2021	Canadian Premier League	24	4	2	0	3	1	—		29	5
Pacific FC	2022	Canadian Premier League	25	6	2	0	1	0	4	2	32	8
Pacific FC	2023	Canadian Premier League	25	4	2	0	3	1	—		30	5
Pacific FC	2024	Canadian Premier League	17	1	1	0	4	1	—		22	2
Pacific FC	2024	Canadian Premier League	27	1	—		1	0	—		28	1
Pacific FC	Total		123	17	7	0	12	3	4	2	146	21
Career totals			216	23	9	0	11	3	4	2	241	28

== Honours ==
Pacific FC

- Canadian Premier League: 2021
