= Ayman Sellouf =

Dutch footballer (born 2001)

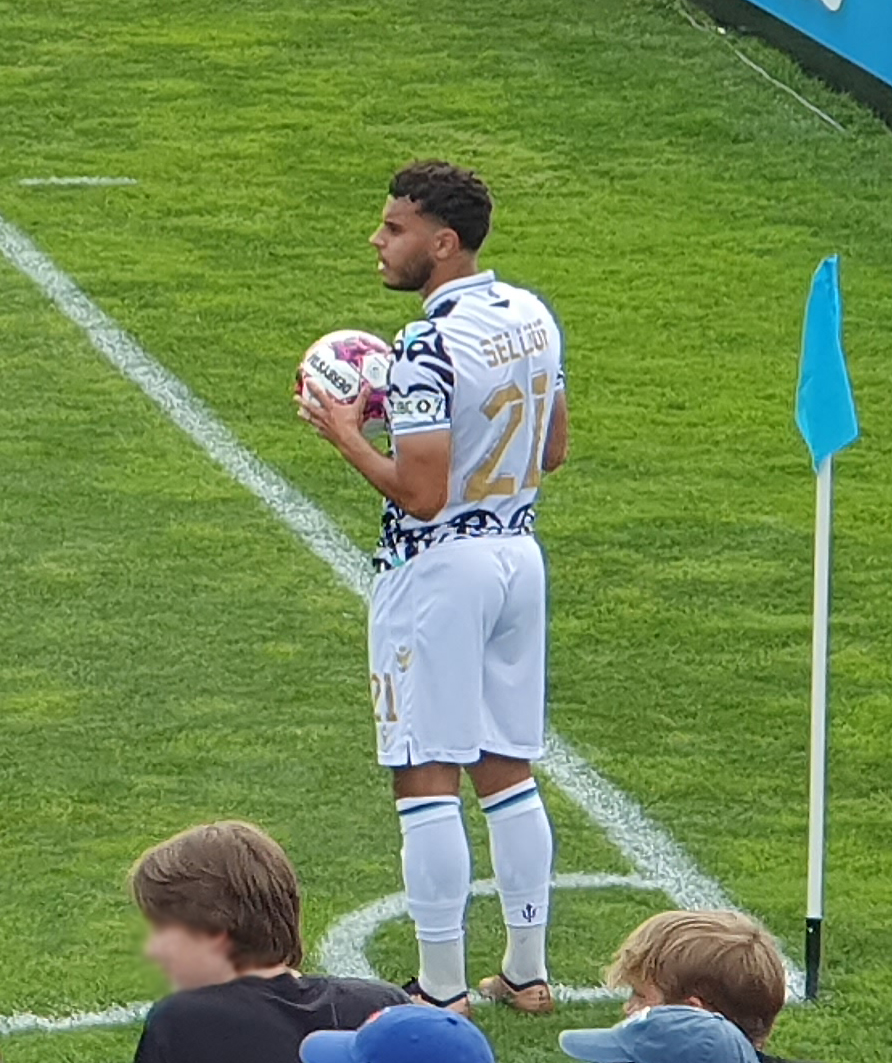
- Sellouf in 2023 with Pacific FC

Personal information
- Date of birth: 25 August 2001 (age 25)
- Place of birth: Nijmegen, Netherlands
- Height: 1.77 m (5 ft 10 in)
- Position: Forward

Team information
- Current team: Vitesse
- Number: 21

Youth career
- –2014: RKSV Brakkenstein
- 2014–2019: NEC

Senior career*
Years	Team	Apps	(Gls)
2019–2021	NEC	24	(3)
2021–2022	Jong FC Utrecht	24	(2)
2023–2024	Pacific FC	37	(10)
2024	→ Vancouver FC (loan)	10	(1)
2025	Krumovgrad	10	(0)
2025	Cavalry FC	14	(0)
2026–	Vitesse	3	(1)
- * Club domestic league appearances and goals as of 25 August 2026

Ayman Sellouf (born 25 August 2001) is a Dutch professional footballer who plays as a forward for Vitesse in the Eerste Divisie.

== Early life ==
Sellouf began playing football with local club RKSV Brakkenstein. In 2014, he joined the youth system of NEC. In 2018, he scored a hat trick in a 4–0 victory over the Ajax Youth Academy in the championship final to win the U17 Cup.

== Club career ==
In April 2019, he signed his first professional contract with NEC, signing a two-year deal, for the 2019–20 season. During the club's pre-season, he scored six goals, including a hat trick against lower-tier side Overasseltse Boys. He made his official debut on 19 August 2019 against Jong Ajax. He scored his first goal on 7 February 2020 against Telstar, scoring the final goal in a 7–1 victory, which set the record for NEC's largest ever away victory. He made his first start on 28 February 2020 against NAC Breda. During the 2020–21 season, he helped the club earn promotion to the top tier Eredivise for the following season, but he did not remain with the club for that season.

In July 2021, he went on trial with FC Utrecht. In August 2021, he signed a two-year contract, with an option for a third season, joining the second team Jong FC Utrecht, who played in the Eerste Divisie. In August 2022, his contract was terminated by mutual consent.

In January 2023, he joined Canadian Premier League club Pacific FC. On 23 April, he made his first start and scored his first goal in a match against Cavalry FC, subsequently being named to the CPL Team of the Week. In May 2023, he was named the CPL Player of the Week for week 4. He was named the league Player of the Month for June. He spent much of the season in a supersub role, contributing eight goal contributions (goals and assists) off of the bench. At the end of the season, he was one of ten nominees for CPL Players’ Player of the Year award. In January 2024, the club picked up his option for the 2024 season, despite there being interest from foreign clubs in acquiring him on a transfer.

In August 2024, he was loaned to Vancouver FC for the remainder of 2024 in a loan swap, with Moses Dyer heading to Pacific FC on loan for the same duration. He returned to Pacific FC in December 2024 at the conclusion of his loan, but his contract expired, leaving him a free agent.

On February 23, 2025, Sellouf signed with Krumovgrad in the Bulgarian Parva Liga.

In July 2025, he returned to the Canadian Premier League, signing with Cavalry FC for the remainder of 2025, with options for 2026 and 2027. Sellouf's option for the 2026 season would not be exercised by the club.

In July 2026, he returned to the Netherlands, signing with Eerste Divisie side Vitesse. On 17 August, he scored his first goal in a victory over Jong FC Utrecht.

== International career ==
Born in the Netherlands, Sellouf is of Moroccan descent.

He has previously attending a training camp with the Morocco U18 national team.

== Career statistics ==
As of November 9, 2025

Club	Season	League			Playoffs		Cup (Note: Includes KNVB Cup, Canadian Championship)		Other		Total	
Club	Season	Division	Apps	Goals	Apps	Goals	Apps	Goals	Apps	Goals	apps	Goals
NEC	2019–20	Eerste Divisie	8	1	—		1	0	—		9	1
NEC	2020–21	Eerste Divisie	16	2	—		1	0	0	0	17	2
NEC	Total		24	3	0	0	2	0	0	0	26	3
Jong Utrecht	2021–22	Eerste Divisie	24	2	—		—		—		24	2
Pacific FC	2023	Canadian Premier League	27	7	3	0	3	0	—		33	7
Pacific FC	2024	Canadian Premier League	10	3	0	0	3	1	—		13	4
Pacific FC	Total		37	10	3	0	6	1	0	0	46	11
Vancouver FC (loan)	2024	Canadian Premier League	10	1	—		0	0	—		10	1
FC Krumovgrad	2024–25	First League	10	0	0	0	0	0	0	0	10	0
Cavalry FC	2025	Canadian Premier League	14	0	2	0	0	0	0	0	16	0
Career total			119	16	5	0	8	1	0	0	132	17
