= Georges Mukumbilwa =

Canadian soccer player

Personal information
- Full name: Georges Mukumbilwa
- Date of birth: September 23, 1999 (age 27)
- Place of birth: Kalima, DR Congo
- Height: 5 ft 9 in (1.75 m)
- Positions: Right-back; midfielder

Team information
- Current team: Pacific FC
- Number: 2

Youth career
- Portage Trail SC
- 2014–2019: Vancouver Whitecaps FC

Senior career*
Years	Team	Apps	(Gls)
2016	Whitecaps FC 2	0	(0)
2019–2020	Vancouver Whitecaps FC	1	(0)
2022–	Pacific FC	69	(0)

International career
2016	Canada U18	1	(0)
- * Club domestic league appearances and goals as of October 24, 2025

Georges Mukumbilwa (born September 23, 1999) is a professional soccer player who plays as a right-back for Canadian Premier League team Pacific FC. Born in the DR Congo, he represented Canada internationally at youth level.

== Early life ==
Mukumbilwa was born in Kalima, Democratic Republic of Congo, but grew up in a refugee camp in Rwanda, after fleeing a civil war in his home country. He moved to Winnipeg, Canada with his family, at age 13 where began playing organized soccer with Portage Trail SC. He joined the Manitoba provincial team at U15 level. In 2014, Mukumbilwa joined the Vancouver Whitecaps FC Academy. He eventually joined the Vancouver Whitecaps FC U-23 squad for matches. He was called up to the Whitecaps FC 2 squad for a match on September 2, 2016, in the USL, but did not appear in the match.

== Club career ==
In August 2019, Mukumbilwa signed as a homegrown player with Major League Soccer club Vancouver Whitecaps FC, after having participated in the team's preseason camp earlier in the year. On October 6, 2019, Mukumbilwa made his first MLS appearance, coming on as a substitute in the 80th minute of a 1–0 defeat to Real Salt Lake. He did not appear in any matches in the 2020 season, as visa issues prevented him from travelling to the United States, where the Whitecaps played the majority of their matches, due to the COVID-19 pandemic. He was released by Vancouver on November 30, 2020, with Vancouver's CEO Axel Schuster stating "Georges is a hard working player with good character". "We felt now is the right time for him to find a new team so he can earn regular minutes...". In 2021, he went on trial with Canadian Premier League club Valour FC.

In March 2022, Mukumbilwa signed with Canadian Premier League team Pacific FC, after having trialed with them in preseason. He helped the club qualify for the playoffs in his debut season. In September 2023, he signed an extension through the 2024 season, with a club option for 2025. After the 2024 season, the club picked up his option for 2025.

== International career ==
In 2016, he was called up to the Canada U18 team.

== Career statistics ==
As of match played October 24, 2025

Club	Season	League			Playoffs		National Cup		Continental		Total	
Club	Season	Division	Apps	Goals	Apps	Goals	Apps	Goals	Apps	Goals	Apps	Goals
Vancouver Whitecaps FC	2019	Major League Soccer	1	0	–		0	0	–		1	0
Vancouver Whitecaps FC	2020	Major League Soccer	0	0	–		–		–		0	0
Vancouver Whitecaps FC	Total		1	0	0	0	0	0	0	0	1	0
Pacific FC	2022	Canadian Premier League	17	0	1	0	0	0	2	0	20	0
Pacific FC	2023	Canadian Premier League	21	0	3	0	3	0	–		27	0
Pacific FC	2024	Canadian Premier League	11	0	0	0	2	0	–		13	0
Pacific FC	2025	Canadian Premier League	20	0	–		0	0	–		20	0
Pacific FC	Total		69	0	4	0	5	0	2	0	80	0
Career total			70	0	4	0	5	0	2	0	81	0
