= Luca Ricci (Canadian soccer) =

Canadian soccer player

Personal information
- Full name: Luca Salvatore Ricci
- Date of birth: 23 February 1998 (age 28)
- Place of birth: LaSalle, Quebec, Canada
- Height: 1.75 m (5 ft 9 in)
- Position: Midfielder

Youth career
- 2015–2018: Montreal Impact

College career
Years	Team	Apps	(Gls)
2021–	Montreal Carabins		

Senior career*
Years	Team	Apps	(Gls)
2018	Montreal Impact	0	(0)
2018	→ Phoenix Rising (loan)	4	(0)
2019	Ottawa Fury	0	(0)
2019	→ Montreal Impact (loan)	0	(0)
2021	FC Lanaudière	5	(0)
2022	Pacific FC	6	(0)
- * Club domestic league appearances and goals as of September 18, 2022 ‡ National team caps and goals as of February 2, 2018

Luca Salvatore Ricci (born February 23, 1998) is a Canadian professional soccer player who plays as a midfielder.

== Club career ==
Ricci began his career with the Montreal Impact Academy. Ricci was loaned to Phoenix Rising FC for the 2018 season on February 2, 2018. He signed with Ottawa Fury FC on February 1, 2019. He joined the Fury's MLS-affiliate Montreal Impact on an emergency loan under the Emergency Hardship Rule.

In 2021, he began playing university soccer for the Montreal Carabins, while also playing in the semi-pro PLSQ with FC Lanaudière.

At the 2022 CPL-U Sports Draft, he was selected 8th overall by Pacific FC. On May 12, 2022, he signed a U Sports contract with Pacific. He departed the club at the end of the season.

== International career ==
In 2017, he was called up to a Quebec-Canada U20 team to play friendlies against Haiti U20, who were preparing for the 2017 Jeux de la Francophonie.

== Personal life ==
Ricci was born in LaSalle, Quebec, Canada to Italian parents. His mother was born in Calabria, Italy. He speaks English, French and Italian.
