= Umaro Baldé (footballer, born 2002) =

Bissau-Guinean footballer (born 2002)

Personal information
- Date of birth: 7 October 2002 (age 24)
- Place of birth: Quelele, Guinea-Bissau
- Height: 1.68 m (5 ft 6 in)
- Position: Midfielder

Team information
- Current team: Gafanha

Youth career
- 2012–2014: Damaiense
- 2014–2019: Sporting CP
- 2019–2021: Rangers

Senior career*
Years	Team	Apps	(Gls)
2022	Pacific FC	4	(0)
2023–	Gafanha		

International career
2017	Portugal U15	5	(1)
2017	Portugal U16	2	(0)
- * Club domestic league appearances and goals as of 2 November 2022

Umaro Baldé (born 7 October 2002) is a footballer who plays for Gafanha in the Portuguese District Championships. Born in Guinea-Bissau, he represented Portugal at youth international level.

== Early life ==
Baldé grew up in Quelele, Guinea-Bissau in poverty, with his family moving to Portugal when he was eight or nine for a better lifestyle. At the age of 12, Balde joined the youth academy of Portuguese fifth tier side Damaiense. After impressing in a match against the Sporting CP Youth Academy in a tournament, he was asked to join their program. In 2019, he left Sporting.

In 2019, he signed a contract with Scottish club Rangers' youth academy, joining on a two-year contract. He made his U18 debut in a pre-season friendly against Partick Thistle on 8 July. Playing mainly with the U18 squad, he appeared for the club in UEFA Youth League matches, as well as the reserve team. He left the club by mutual consent on 1 February 2021. After departing Rangers, he returned to Portugal and then participated in a two-month intensive training program with Prestige Sports to maintain fitness.

== Club career ==
In early 2022, he went on trial with Canadian Premier League club Pacific FC during their pre-season. On 16 March 2022, Balde signed his first professional contract with Pacific for the 2022 season. On 28 May, he debuted for Pacific FC during a 2–2 draw with Valour FC. At the end of the year, Baldé departed the club.

In the summer of 2023, he joined Portuguese club Gafanha.

== International career ==
He represented Portugal at the U15 and U16 levels. In 2020, he was called up to a camp for the Portugal U18 team.
