= Gianni dos Santos =

Professional footballer (born 1998)

Personal information
- Full name: Gianni Miguel dos Santos
- Date of birth: 21 November 1998 (age 27)
- Place of birth: Rotterdam, Netherlands
- Height: 1.76 m (5 ft 9 in)
- Position: Winger

Team information
- Current team: RAEC Mons
- Number: 21

Youth career
- Spartaan '20
- –2017: Dordrecht

Senior career*
Years	Team	Apps	(Gls)
2017–2018	Dordrecht	4	(0)
2018–2020	Jong Sparta	43	(11)
2018–2019	Sparta Rotterdam	2	(0)
2020–2021	Dordrecht	17	(4)
2021–2022	Pacific FC	40	(4)
2023	Atlético Ottawa	19	(2)
2024	Inter Kashi	10	(2)
2024–2025	Lokomotiv Sofia	11	(0)
2025–	RAEC Mons	14	(3)

International career
2022	Cape Verde	1	(0)
- * Club domestic league appearances and goals as of 28 June 2026

Gianni Miguel dos Santos (born 21 November 1998) is a professional footballer who plays as a winger for RAEC Mons. Born in the Netherlands, he plays for the Cape Verde national team.

== Club career ==
Dos Santos made his professional debut on 22 December 2017 for FC Dordrecht in the Eerste Divisie, in the 2–3 home loss to Jong PSV. He came on as a substitute for Denis Mahmudov in the 69th minute. In the summer of 2018, he left for Jong Sparta, where he played in the third-tier Tweede Divisie. He made his debut in the first team of Sparta on 18 November 2018, in the 1–1 away draw against NEC. He came on for Ilias Alhaft in the 67th minute.

In October 2020, Dos Santos returned to Dordrecht. He immediately impressed in his first match back, scoring and giving an assist in the 2–2 draw against Almere City, as he was rewarded with the 'man of the match' award afterwards. Head coach of Dordrecht, Harry van den Ham, called Dos Santos a "diamond in the rough" after his performance against Almere City and lauded his pace and threat in front of goal.

On 20 May 2021, Dos Santos signed with Canadian Premier League club Pacific FC. Dos Santos is the third international player to sign with Pacific FC for the 2021 season.

In February 2023, he signed with fellow CPL side Atlético Ottawa on a two-year contract.

On 1 January 2024, Dos Santos joined I-League club Inter Kashi for an undisclosed fee. On 4 February 2024, he scored first goal in his season debut against Shillong Lajong.

== International career ==
In March 2020, dos Santos was called up to Cape Verde. He was called up again in June 2022 for a friendly against Ecuador in Miami. He made his debut for his country in the match on 11 June, as a second-half substitute in an eventual 1–0 defeat.
