= 2020 Pacific FC season =

Pacific FC
2020 season
- Chairman: Dean Shillington
- Head coach: Pa-Modou Kah
- Stadium: Westhills Stadium
- Canadian Premier League: 4th
- Canadian Championship: Did not qualify
- Top goalscorer: League: Marco Bustos (5); All: Marco Bustos (5)
Home colours	Away colours

The 2020 Pacific FC season was the second in the club's history, as well as second in the Canadian Premier League. In 2019, Pacific had finished 5th overall, failing to qualify for the CPL Finals.

On March 20, 2020, the league announced a postponement of the start of the season due to the COVID-19 pandemic.

== Squad ==
As of August 14, 2020.

No.	Player	Nationality	Position(s)	Date of birth (age)	Previous club
Goalkeepers
1	Nolan Wirth	(Canada)	GK	January 24, 1995 (aged 25)	(Canada) Victoria Highlanders
13	Callum Irving	(Canada)	GK	March 16, 1993 (aged 27)	(Canada) Ottawa Fury
	Emil Gazdov	(Canada)	GK	September 11, 2003 (aged 17)	(Canada) Vancouver Whitecaps
Defenders
2	Kadin Chung	(Canada)	RB	September 5, 1998 (aged 22)	(Germany) Kaiserslautern II
3	Jordan Haynes	(Canada)	LB / LW	January 17, 1996 (aged 24)	(Canada) Vancouver TSS Rovers
5	Abdou Samake	(Mali)	CB	October 7, 1996 (aged 24)	(United States) University of Michigan
6	Lukas MacNaughton	(United States)	CB	March 8, 1995 (aged 25)	(Canada) Alliance United
17	Marcel de Jong	(Canada)	LB	October 15, 1986 (aged 34)	(Canada) Vancouver Whitecaps
26	Thomas Meilleur-Giguère	(Canada)	CB	November 13, 1997 (aged 23)	(Canada) Montreal Impact
Midfielders
7	Víctor Blasco	(Spain)	MF	July 1, 1994 (aged 26)	(Canada) VIU Mariners
8	Matthew Baldisimo	(Canada)	DM / CM	January 20, 1998 (aged 22)	(United States) Fresno FC
10	Marco Bustos	(Canada)	AM	April 22, 1996 (aged 24)	(Canada) Valour FC
11	Josh Heard	(Wales)	AM	November 29, 1994 (aged 26)	(United States) Real Monarchs
16	Zach Verhoven	(Canada)	RW / LW	August 17, 1998 (aged 22)	(Canada) UBC Thunderbirds
19	Noah Verhoeven	(Canada)	CM	June 15, 1999 (aged 21)	(United States) Fresno FC
20	Sean Young	(Canada)	CM	April 20, 2001 (aged 19)	(Canada) Victoria Highlanders
21	Alessandro Hojabrpour	(Canada)	AM	January 10, 2000 (aged 20)	(Bulgaria) Lokomotiv Plovdiv
22	Jamar Dixon	(Canada)	CM	June 5, 1989 (aged 31)	(Canada) Ottawa Fury
Forwards
9	Alejandro Díaz	(Mexico)	FW	January 27, 1996 (aged 24)	(Mexico) Club América
14	Terran Campbell	(Canada)	LW / ST	October 10, 1998 (aged 22)	(United States) Fresno FC

== Transfers ==
=== In ===
No.	Pos.	Player	Transferred from	Fee/notes	Date	Source
26	DF	(Canada) Thomas Meilleur-Giguère	(Canada) Montreal Impact	Free transfer	January 21, 2020	
22	MF	(Canada) Jamar Dixon	(Canada) Ottawa Fury	Free transfer	January 21, 2020	
10	MF	(Canada) Marco Bustos	(Canada) Valour FC	Free transfer	January 30, 2020	
9	FW	(Mexico) Alejandro Díaz	(Mexico) Club América	Free transfer	February 6, 2020	
13	GK	(Canada) Callum Irving	(Canada) Ottawa Fury	Free transfer	February 19, 2020	
5	DF	(Mali) Abdou Samake	(United States) University of Michigan	Free transfer	February 21, 2020	
	GK	(Canada) Emil Gazdov	(Canada) Vancouver Whitecaps	Free transfer	June 30, 2020	
3	DF	(Canada) Jordan Haynes	(Canada) Vancouver TSS Rovers	Free transfer	July 15, 2020	
20	MF	(Canada) Sean Young	(Canada) Victoria Highlanders	Free transfer	July 23, 2020	
11	MF	(Wales) Josh Heard	(United States) Real Monarchs	Free transfer	July 31, 2020	

==== Draft picks ====
Pacific FC selected the following players in the 2019 CPL–U Sports Draft on November 11, 2019. Draft picks are not automatically signed to the team roster. Only those who are signed to a contract will be listed as transfers in.

Round	Selection	Pos.	Player	Nationality	University
1	3	DF	Jan Pirretas Glasmacher	Spain	TRU WolfPack
2	12	MF	Thomas Gardner	Canada	UBC Thunderbirds

=== Out ===
No.	Pos.	Player	Transferred to	Fee/notes	Date	Source
26	GK	(Canada) Mark Village	Retired	Contract expired	November 4, 2019	
5	DF	(Germany) Hendrik Starostzik	(Denmark) Næstved BK	Contract expired	November 4, 2019	
3	DF	(Northern Ireland) Ryan McCurdy		Contract expired	November 4, 2019	
20	DF	(Canada) Émile Legault	(United States) Rio Grande Valley FC	Contract expired	November 4, 2019	
15	FW	(Canada) José Hernández	(Canada) Cavalry FC	Contract expired	November 4, 2019	
13	MF	(Saudi Arabia) Ahmed Alghamdi	(Saudi Arabia) Al-Ettifaq	Contract expired	January 23, 2020	
28	MF	(Panama) Alexander González	(Panama) Sporting San Miguelito	Contract expired	January 29, 2020	
10	MF	(Canada) Ben Fisk	(Canada) Atlético Ottawa	Contract expired	February 25, 2020	
9	FW	(Canada) Marcus Haber	(Canada) Cavalry FC	Contract expired	July 31, 2020	
11	MF	(Canada) Issey Nakajima-Farran		Contract expired	August 10, 2020	

==== Loans Out ====
No.	Pos.	Player	Loaned to	Fee/notes	Date	Source
	GK	(Canada) Emil Gazdov	(Germany) FC Nürnberg	Loaned until June 2022	October 7, 2020	

== Canadian Premier League ==
Match times are Pacific Daylight Time (UTC−7).

=== First stage ===
==== Table ====
Pos	Team	Pld	W	D	L	GF	GA	GD	Pts	Qualification
1	Cavalry	7	4	1	2	10	7	+3	13	Advance to group stage
2	HFX Wanderers	7	3	3	1	12	7	+5	12 (Note: Head-to-head points: HFX Wanderers 1, Forge 1. Goal differential: HFX Wanderers +5, Forge +4)	Advance to group stage
3	Forge	7	3	3	1	13	9	+4	12	Advance to group stage
4	Pacific	7	3	2	2	10	8	+2	11	Advance to group stage
5	York9	7	2	4	1	8	7	+1	10	
6	Valour	7	2	2	3	8	9	−1	8 (Note: Head-to-head points: Valour 3, Atlético Ottawa 0.)	
7	Atlético Ottawa	7	2	2	3	7	12	−5	8	
8	FC Edmonton	7	0	1	6	5	14	−9	1	

Source: CanPL.ca
Rules for classification: 1) points; 2) head-to-head points; 3) goal differential; 4) goals for; 5) total wins; 6) U-21 minutes; 7) coin toss or drawing of lots.

==== Results by match ====
Match	1	2	3	4	5	6	7
Result	D	D	L	W	W	L	W
Position	1	3	6	3	3	6	4

Updated to match(es) played on September 6, 2020. Source: #Matches
W = Win; D = Draw; L = Loss

==== Matches ====
August 15 1	HFX Wanderers FC	2–2	Pacific FC	Charlottetown, Prince Edward Island
12:00pm	Morelli 12' (pen.); Béland-Goyette (yellow card) 65'; Sanoh 86' (pen.)	Report	Haynes (yellow card) 44'; Baldisimo (yellow card) 66'; Verhoven 68'; Bustos 75'	Stadium: Alumni Field; Referee: Myriam Marcotte

August 18 2	Pacific FC	1–1	York9 FC	Charlottetown, Prince Edward Island
5:00pm	Blasco (yellow card) 10'; Bustos (yellow card) 84'; McNaughton 90+2'	Report	Rivero 70'; Di Chiara (yellow card) 83'	Stadium: Alumni Field; Referee: Pierre-Luc Lauzière

August 22 3	Forge FC	2–1	Pacific FC	Charlottetown, Prince Edward Island
1:00pm	Nanco 18'; Edgar (yellow card) 37'; Bekker 90+7'	Report	Dixon 26', (yellow card) 73'; Bustos (yellow card) 45'; Verhoven (yellow card) 71'	Stadium: Alumni Field; Referee: Mathieu Souaré

August 25 4	Pacific FC	2–0	Valour FC	Charlottetown, Prince Edward Island
5:00pm	Díaz 4'; Dixon (yellow card) 33'; Blasco 83'	Report	Ricci (yellow card) 68'	Stadium: Alumni Field; Referee: David Barrie

August 30 5	Cavalry FC	1–2	Pacific FC	Charlottetown, Prince Edward Island
9:00am	Haber (yellow card) 20'; Mavila 55' (pen.); Boskovic (yellow card) 72'; Farsi (yellow card) 90+5'	Report	Bustos 22'; Díaz 26'; Haynes (yellow card) 55'	Stadium: Alumni Field; Referee: Juan Marquez

September 2 6	Pacific FC	0–1	Atlético Ottawa	Charlottetown, Prince Edward Island
5:00pm	Blasco (yellow card) 85'; Bustos (yellow card) 90+2'	Report	McKendry (yellow card) 47'; Kapor (yellow card) 49'; Acuña (yellow card) 55'; Viti (yellow card) 63', (goal) 90'	Stadium: Alumni Field; Referee: Mathieu Souaré

September 6 7	Pacific FC	2–1	FC Edmonton	Charlottetown, Prince Edward Island
12:00pm	Heard 64'; Bustos 85'	Report	Soria (yellow card) 54'; Ongaro 59'; Mohammed (yellow card) 92'	Stadium: Alumni Field; Referee: Juan Marquez

=== Group stage ===
==== Table ====
Pos	Team	Pld	W	D	L	GF	GA	GD	Pts	Qualification
1	Forge	3	2	1	0	4	1	+3	7	Advance to final
2	HFX Wanderers	3	1	1	1	3	7	−4	4	Advance to final
3	Cavalry	3	1	0	2	4	4	0	3 (Note: Head-to-head points: Cavalry 3, Pacific 0.)	
4	Pacific	3	1	0	2	6	5	+1	3	

Source: CanPL.ca
Rules for classification: 1) points; 2) head-to-head points; 3) goal differential; 4) goals for; 5) total wins; 6) U-21 minutes; 7) coin toss or drawing of lots.

==== Results by round ====
Round	1	2	3
Result	L	L	W
Position	4	4	4

Updated to match(es) played on September 15, 2020. Source: #Matches
W = Win; D = Draw; L = Loss

==== Matches ====
September 9 1	Cavalry FC	3–1	Pacific FC	Charlottetown, Prince Edward Island
5:00pm	Nikolas Ledgerwood 15'; Adekugbe 49'; Farsi (yellow card) 66' (goal) 75'; Simmons (yellow card) 70'	Report	Zator 53' (o.g.); Heard (yellow card) 64'	Stadium: Alumni Field; Referee: David Barrie

September 12 2	Forge FC	2–0	Pacific FC	Charlottetown, Prince Edward Island
9:00am	Krutzen 35' (pen.); Balbinotti (yellow card) 43'; Novak 71'; Achinioti-Jönsson (yellow card) 84'	Report	Chung (yellow card) 34'; Young (yellow card) 36'	Stadium: Alumni Field; Referee: Juan Marquez

September 15 3	HFX Wanderers FC	0–5	Pacific FC	Charlottetown, Prince Edward Island
5:00pm		Report	Campbell 8'; Bustos 29'; Díaz 44'; Bustos 45+1'; Blasco 81'; Meilleur-Giguère (yellow card) 90'	Stadium: Alumni Field; Referee: Myriam Marcotte

== Statistics ==
=== Squad and statistics ===
As of September 16, 2020

No.	Pos	Nat	Player	Total		Canadian Premier League	
No.	Pos	Nat	Player	Apps	Goals	Apps	Goals
1	GK	(Canada) CAN	Nolan Wirth	4	0	4+0	0
2	DF	(Canada) CAN	Kadin Chung	9	0	9+0	0
3	DF	(Canada) CAN	Jordan Haynes	8	0	4+4	0
5	DF	(Mali) MLI	Abdou Samake	3	0	2+1	0
6	DF	(United States) USA	Lukas MacNaughton	8	1	8+0	1
7	MF	(Spain) ESP	Víctor Blasco	10	2	8+2	2
8	MF	(Canada) CAN	Matthew Baldisimo	10	0	10+0	0
9	FW	(Mexico) MEX	Alejandro Díaz	10	3	7+3	3
10	MF	(Canada) CAN	Marco Bustos	10	5	10+0	5
11	MF	(Wales) WAL	Josh Heard	5	1	2+3	1
13	GK	(Canada) CAN	Callum Irving	6	0	6+0	0
14	FW	(Canada) CAN	Terran Campbell	10	1	4+6	1
16	MF	(Canada) CAN	Zach Verhoven	9	1	2+7	1
17	DF	(Canada) CAN	Marcel de Jong	7	0	6+1	0
19	MF	(Canada) CAN	Noah Verhoeven	3	0	2+1	0
20	MF	(Canada) CAN	Sean Young	9	0	6+3	0
21	MF	(Canada) CAN	Alessandro Hojabrpour	10	0	2+8	0
22	MF	(Canada) CAN	Jamar Dixon	9	1	8+1	1
26	DF	(Canada) CAN	Thomas Meilleur-Giguère	10	0	10+0	0

=== Top scorers ===
Rank	Nat.	Player	Pos.	Canadian Premier League	TOTAL
1	(Canada)	Marco Bustos	MF	5	5
2	(Mexico)	Alejandro Díaz	FW	3	3
3	(Spain)	Victor Blasco	MF	2	2
4	(United States)	Lukas MacNaughton	DF	1	1
4	(Canada)	Zach Verhoven	MF	1	1
4	(Canada)	Jamar Dixon	MF	1	1
4	(Wales)	Josh Heard	MF	1	1
4	(Canada)	Terran Campbell	FW	1	1
Totals				15	15

Updated to match played September 16, 2020
Source: Canadian Premier League

=== Top assists ===
Rank	Nat.	Player	Pos.	Canadian Premier League	TOTAL
1	(Canada)	Marco Bustos	MF	3	3
2	(Spain)	Víctor Blasco	MF	2	2
2	(Mexico)	Alejandro Díaz	FW	2	2
4	(Canada)	Zach Verhoven	MF	1	1
4	(Canada)	Matthew Baldisimo	MF	1	1
4	(Canada)	Jamar Dixon	MF	1	1
4	(Canada)	Kadin Chung	DF	1	1
4	(Canada)	Terran Campbell	FW	1	1
4	(Wales)	Josh Heard	MF	1	1
Totals				12	12

Updated to match played September 16, 2020
Source: Canadian Premier League

=== Clean sheets ===
Rank	Nat.	Player	Canadian Premier League	TOTAL
1	(Canada)	Callum Irving	1	1
1	(Canada)	Nolan Wirth	1	1
Totals			2	2

Updated to match played September 16, 2020
Source: Canadian Premier League

=== Disciplinary record ===
No.	Pos.	Nat.	Player	Canadian Premier League		TOTAL	
No.	Pos.	Nat.	Player	Yellow card	Red card	Yellow card	Red card
2	DF	(Canada)	Kadin Chung	1	0	1	0
3	DF	(Canada)	Jordan Haynes	2	0	2	0
7	MF	(Spain)	Víctor Blasco	2	0	2	0
8	MF	(Canada)	Matthew Baldisimo	1	0	1	0
10	MF	(Canada)	Marco Bustos	3	0	3	0
16	MF	(Canada)	Zach Verhoven	1	0	1	0
20	MF	(Canada)	Sean Young	1	0	1	0
22	MF	(Canada)	Jamar Dixon	2	0	2	0
26	DF	(Canada)	Thomas Meilleur-Giguère	1	0	1	0
Totals				14	0	14	0

Updated to match played September 16, 2020
Source: Canadian Premier League
