= 2019 Pacific FC season =

Pacific FC
2019 season
- Chairman: Dean Shillington
- Head coach: Michael Silberbauer (until October 18); James Merriman (interim, from October 18)
- Stadium: Westhills Stadium
- Canadian Premier League: Spring: 5th Fall: 4th Overall: 5th
- CPL finals: Did not qualify
- Canadian Championship: First qualifying round
- Top goalscorer: League: Terran Campbell (11); All: Terran Campbell (11)
- Highest home attendance: 5,154 (April 28 vs. HFX Wanderers FC)
- Lowest home attendance: 1,200 (September 11 vs. York9 FC)
- Average home league attendance: League: 3,021; All: 2,973
Home colours	Away colours

The 2019 Pacific FC season was the first in Pacific FC's history, as well as first season in Canadian Premier League history.

== Squad ==
As of October 19, 2019.

No.	Player	Nationality	Position(s)	Date of birth (age)	Previous club
Goalkeepers
1	Nolan Wirth	(Canada)	GK	January 24, 1995 (aged 24)	(Canada) Victoria Highlanders
26	Mark Village	(Canada)	GK	November 25, 1991 (aged 28)	(United States) FC Cincinnati
Defenders
3	Ryan McCurdy	(Northern Ireland)	CB	May 23, 1991 (aged 28)	(Canada) VIU Mariners
4	Blake Smith	(United States)	LB	January 17, 1991 (aged 28)	(United States) FC Cincinnati
5	Hendrik Starostzik	(Germany)	CB	March 28, 1991 (aged 28)	(Germany) Hallescher FC
6	Lukas MacNaughton	(United States)	CB	March 8, 1995 (aged 24)	(Canada) Alliance United
7	Kadin Chung	(Canada)	RB	September 5, 1998 (aged 21)	(Germany) Kaiserslautern II
17	Marcel de Jong	(Canada)	LB	October 15, 1986 (aged 33)	(Canada) Vancouver Whitecaps
20	Émile Legault	(Canada)	CB/FB	April 10, 2000 (aged 19)	(France) Auxerre
Midfielders
8	Matthew Baldisimo	(Canada)	DM / CM	January 20, 1998 (aged 21)	(United States) Fresno FC
10	Ben Fisk	(Canada)	RW / LW	February 4, 1993 (aged 26)	(Republic of Ireland) Derry City
11	Issey Nakajima-Farran	(Canada)	RW / LW	May 16, 1984 (aged 35)	(Malaysia) Pahang
13	Ahmed Alghamdi	(Saudi Arabia)	CM	September 20, 2001 (aged 18)	(Canada) Rino's Vancouver SC
16	Zach Verhoven	(Canada)	RW / LW	August 17, 1998 (aged 21)	(Canada) UBC Thunderbirds
19	Noah Verhoeven	(Canada)	CM	June 15, 1999 (aged 20)	(United States) Fresno FC
21	Alessandro Hojabrpour	(Canada)	AM	January 10, 2000 (aged 19)	(Bulgaria) Lokomotiv Plovdiv
23	Víctor Blasco	(Spain)	MF	July 1, 1994 (aged 25)	(Canada) VIU Mariners
24	David Norman Jr.	(Canada)	MF	May 31, 1998 (aged 21)	(Canada) Vancouver Whitecaps
28	Alexander González	(Panama)	DM	December 14, 1994 (aged 25)	(Panama) Plaza Amador
Forwards
9	Marcus Haber	(Canada)	CF	January 11, 1989 (aged 30)	(Scotland) Dundee
14	Terran Campbell	(Canada)	LW / ST	October 10, 1998 (aged 21)	(United States) Fresno FC
15	José Hernández	(Canada)	ST	March 19, 2000 (aged 19)	(Canada) Vancouver Whitecaps Residency

== Transfers ==
=== In ===
No.	Pos.	Player	Transferred from	Fee/notes	Date	Source
7	DF	(Canada) Kadin Chung	(Germany) Kaiserslautern II	Free Transfer	November 29, 2018	
9	FW	(Canada) Marcus Haber	(Scotland) Dundee	Free Transfer	January 9, 2019	
21	MF	(Canada) Alessandro Hojabrpour	(Bulgaria) Lokomotiv Plovdiv	Free Transfer	January 15, 2019	
8	MF	(Canada) Matthew Baldisimo	(United States) Fresno FC	Free Transfer	January 15, 2019	
14	FW	(Canada) Terran Campbell	(United States) Fresno FC	Free Transfer	January 15, 2019	
26	GK	(Canada) Mark Village	(United States) FC Cincinnati	Free Transfer	January 21, 2019	
19	MF	(Canada) Noah Verhoeven	(United States) Fresno FC	Free Transfer	January 21, 2019	
10	MF	(Canada) Ben Fisk	(Republic of Ireland) Derry City	Free Transfer	February 7, 2019	
15	FW	(Canada) José Hernández	(Canada) Vancouver Whitecaps Residency	Free Transfer	February 7, 2019	
23	MF	(Spain) Víctor Blasco	(Canada) VIU Mariners	Free Transfer	February 7, 2019	
17	DF	(Canada) Marcel de Jong	(Canada) Vancouver Whitecaps	Free Transfer	February 19, 2019	
1	GK	(Canada) Nolan Wirth	(Canada) Victoria Highlanders	Free Transfer	February 26, 2019	
11	MF	(Canada) Issey Nakajima-Farran	(Malaysia) Pahang	Free Transfer	March 5, 2019	
5	DF	(Germany) Hendrik Starostzik	(Germany) Hallescher FC	Free Transfer	March 7, 2019	
6	DF	(United States) Lukas MacNaughton	(Canada) Alliance United	Free Transfer	March 7, 2019	
3	DF	(Northern Ireland) Ryan McCurdy	(Canada) VIU Mariners	Free Transfer	April 17, 2019	
20	DF	(Canada) Émile Legault	(France) Auxerre	Free Transfer	April 25, 2019	
16	MF	(Canada) Zach Verhoven	(Canada) UBC Thunderbirds	Selected 9th overall in the 2018 CPL–U Sports Draft	April 27, 2019	
13	MF	(Saudi Arabia) Ahmed Alghamdi	(Canada) Rino's Vancouver SC	Free Transfer	May 3, 2019	
28	MF	(Panama) Alexander González	(Panama) Plaza Amador	Free Transfer	May 17, 2019	

=== Loans in ===
No.	Pos.	Player	Transferred from	Notes	Date	Source
4	DF	(United States) Blake Smith	(United States) FC Cincinnati	Season-long loan	April 8, 2019	
2	GK	(Canada) Tyrone Venhola	(Canada) Victoria Highlanders	Emergency call-up	May 30, 2019	
24	MF	(Canada) David Norman Jr.	(Canada) Vancouver Whitecaps	Loan	September 3, 2019	

=== Draft picks ===
Pacific FC selected the following players in the 2018 CPL–U Sports Draft on November 12, 2018. Draft picks are not automatically signed to the team roster. Only those who are signed to a contract will be listed as transfers in.

Round	Selection	Pos.	Player	Nationality	University
1	6	MF	Thomas Gardner	Canada	UBC Thunderbirds
2	9	MF	Zach Verhoven	Canada	UBC Thunderbirds
3	20	MF	Nick Fussell	Canada	UBC Thunderbirds

== Competitions ==
Match times are Pacific Daylight Time (UTC−7).

=== Preseason ===
March 30	Pacific FC	6–0	Victoria Vikes	Victoria, British Columbia
	Campbell; Gardner; MacNaughton	Report		Stadium: Centennial Stadium

April 22	Pacific FC	8–0	TSS FC Rovers	Langford, British Columbia
1:00 PDT	Blasco; Campbell; Fisk; Smith; Starostzik	Report		Stadium: Goudy Field

=== Canadian Premier League ===
==== Spring season ====
===== League table =====
Pos	Team	Pld	W	D	L	GF	GA	GD	Pts	Qualification
1	Cavalry	10	8	0	2	16	7	+9	24	2019 Canadian Premier League Finals
2	Forge	10	6	1	3	15	7	+8	19	2019 CONCACAF League preliminary round (Note: As winner of home and away matches between FC Edmonton, Forge FC, and Valour FC)
3	FC Edmonton	10	4	2	4	8	9	−1	14	
4	HFX Wanderers	10	3	2	5	8	11	−3	11	
5	Pacific	10	3	2	5	11	15	−4	11	
6	York9	10	2	5	3	9	11	−2	11	
7	Valour	10	3	0	7	8	15	−7	9	

Source: CanPL.ca
Rules for classification: 1) points; 2) total wins; 3) goal differential; 4) goals for; 5) away goal differential; 6) away goals for; 7) home goal differential; 8) home goals for; 9) coin toss or drawing of lots.

===== Results summary =====
Overall								Home						Away					
Pld	W	D	L	GF	GA	GD	Pts	W	D	L	GF	GA	GD	W	D	L	GF	GA	GD
10	3	2	5	11	15	−4	11	2	1	2	8	8	0	1	1	3	3	7	−4

Last updated: July 1, 2019.
Source: canpl.ca

===== Results by match =====
Match	1	2	3	4	5	6	7	8	9	10
Ground	H	H	A	A	H	A	A	A	H	H
Result	W	L	L	D	D	L	L	W	L	W
Position	1	2	6	5	4	5	6	4	6	5

Updated to match(es) played on July 1, 2019. Source: #Matches
A = Away; H = Home; W = Win; D = Draw; L = Loss

===== Matches =====
April 28 1	Pacific FC	1–0	HFX Wanderers FC	Langford, British Columbia
4:00 pm	Starostzik 23'; MacNaughton (yellow card) 45+1' (yellow-red card) 72'; Baldisimo (yellow card) 69'	Report		Stadium: Westhills Stadium; Attendance: 5,154; Referee: Alain Ruch

May 1 2	Pacific FC	1–2	Valour FC	Langford, British Columbia
8:00 pm	Baldisimo (yellow card) 32'; Hernández 45'	Report	Hoyle 23'; Béland-Goyette (yellow card) 24'; Gutiérrez (yellow card) 32'; Murrell (yellow card) 53'; Carreiro 78'	Stadium: Westhills Stadium; Attendance: 2,360; Referee: Juan Marquez

May 8 3	Forge FC	3–0	Pacific FC	Hamilton, Ontario
4:00 pm	Novak 3'; Welshman 14'; Frano 70'; Samuel (yellow card) 88'	Report		Stadium: Tim Hortons Field; Attendance: 5,861; Referee: Filup Dujic

May 12 4	FC Edmonton	0–0	Pacific FC	Edmonton, Alberta
12:30 pm	Lincourt-Joseph (red card) 28'; Esua (yellow card) 42'; Didic (yellow card) 57'	Report	Legault (yellow card) 38'	Stadium: Clarke Stadium; Attendance: 4,238; Referee: David Gantar

May 18 5	Pacific FC	2–2	York9 FC	Langford, British Columbia
12:30 pm	Haber 28'; Fisk 42'; Smith (yellow card) 74'; Village (yellow card) 90+3'	Report	Aparicio (yellow card) 24'; Gattas 53' (pen.), (yellow card) 90+3'; McCurdy 58' (o.g.)	Stadium: Westhills Stadium; Attendance: 2,661; Referee: Pierre-Luc Lauzière

June 1 6	HFX Wanderers FC	2–1	Pacific FC	Halifax, Nova Scotia
11:00 am	Garcia 51'; Perea 68' (pen.)	Report	Campbell 42'; McCurdy (yellow card) 66'	Stadium: Wanderers Grounds; Attendance: 6,244; Referee: Pierre-Luc Lauzière

June 15 7	York9 FC	1–0	Pacific FC	Toronto, Ontario
9:00 am	McCurdy 36' (o.g.)	Report	Baldisimo (yellow card) 56'; González (yellow card) 64'	Stadium: York Lions Stadium; Attendance: 2,914; Referee: David Barrie

June 20 8	Valour FC	1–2	Pacific FC	Winnipeg, Manitoba
5:00 pm	Attardo 45+4'; Béland-Goyette (yellow card) 80'	Report	Blasco (yellow card) 21' (goal) 37'; Campbell 67'; Verhoeven (yellow card) 69'; Hojabrpour (yellow card) 84'	Stadium: IG Field; Attendance: 6,117; Referee: Pierre-Luc Lauzière

June 23 9	Pacific FC	1–3	FC Edmonton	Langford, British Columbia
3:00 pm	Blasco 83'	Report	Ameobi 32'; Diouck 38'; Son (yellow card) 65'; B. Zebie 79'; Esua (yellow card) 89'	Stadium: Westhills Stadium; Attendance: 4,067; Referee: Alain Ruch

July 1 10	Pacific FC	3–1	Cavalry FC	Langford, British Columbia
3:00 pm	Alghamdi 48' (yellow card) 49'; González (yellow card) 51' (red card) 72'; Blasco 76'; Nakajima-Farran 90+7'	Report	Büscher (yellow card) 37'; Eustáquio (yellow card) 51' (red card) 90+6'; Mavila (yellow card) 56'; Loturi (yellow card) 58'; Malonga 61'; Northover (red card) 74'	Stadium: Westhills Stadium; Attendance: 2,781; Referee: Juan Marquez

==== Fall season ====
===== League table =====
Pos	Team	Pld	W	D	L	GF	GA	GD	Pts	Qualification
1	Cavalry	18	11	5	2	35	12	+23	38	2019 Canadian Premier League Finals
2	Forge	18	11	4	3	30	19	+11	37	
3	York9	18	7	2	9	30	26	+4	23	
4	Pacific	18	5	5	8	24	31	−7	20	
5	Valour	18	5	4	9	22	37	−15	19	
6	FC Edmonton	18	4	6	8	19	24	−5	18	
7	HFX Wanderers	18	3	8	7	13	24	−11	17	

Source: CanPL.ca
Rules for classification: 1) points; 2) total wins; 3) goal differential; 4) goals for; 5) away goal differential; 6) away goals for; 7) home goal differential; 8) home goals for; 9) coin toss or drawing of lots.

===== Results summary =====
Overall								Home						Away					
Pld	W	D	L	GF	GA	GD	Pts	W	D	L	GF	GA	GD	W	D	L	GF	GA	GD
18	5	5	8	24	31	−7	20	4	2	3	14	12	+2	1	3	5	10	19	−9

Last updated: October 19, 2019.
Source: canpl.ca

===== Results by match =====
Match	1	2	3	4	5	6	7	8	9	10	11	12	13	14	15	16	17	18
Ground	H	H	A	H	A	A	A	H	A	H	H	H	A	A	H	A	A	H
Result	L	L	L	W	D	L	W	W	D	D	L	W	L	L	D	D	L	W
Position	5	7	7	5	5	7	5	4	5	4	5	3	5	5	4	5	6	4

Updated to match(es) played on October 19, 2019. Source: #Matches
A = Away; H = Home; W = Win; D = Draw; L = Loss

===== Matches =====
July 6 1	Pacific FC	2–3	Cavalry FC	Langford, British Columbia
3:00 pm	Baldisimo (yellow card) 58'; Fisk 59'; Blasco (yellow card) 65'; Campbell 83'	Report	Camargo 21', 61'; Pasquotti 27'; Escalante (yellow card) 37'	Stadium: Westhills Stadium; Attendance: 2,399; Referee: Fabrizio Stasolla

July 13 2	Pacific FC	2–3	Forge FC	Langford, British Columbia
3:00 pm	Legault (yellow card) 5'; Campbell 49'; Blasco 85'; Hernández (yellow card) 87'; Fisk (yellow card) 90+3'	Report	Zajac (yellow card) 12'; Borges 47', 79'; Welshman (yellow card) 50' (goal) 54'	Stadium: Westhills Stadium; Attendance: 2,604; Referee: Mathieu Souaré

July 17 3	York9 FC	2–1	Pacific FC	Toronto, Ontario
4:00 pm	Aparicio 21' (yellow card) 21'; Adjei 67'	Report	Legault (yellow card) 36'; Campbell 66'; Hernández (yellow card) 90+3'	Stadium: York Lions Stadium; Attendance: 1,769; Referee: Filip Dujic

July 20 4	Pacific FC	3–1	HFX Wanderers FC	Langford, British Columbia
3:00 pm	Blasco 9'; Verhoven (yellow card) 26'; Campbell 61', 90+1'	Report	Schaale (yellow card) 8'; Arnone 15' (yellow card) 90+5'; John (yellow card) 54'	Stadium: Westhills Stadium; Attendance: 2,737; Referee: Yusri Rudolf

July 31 5	Valour FC	2–2	Pacific FC	Winnipeg, Manitoba
5:00 pm	Paolucci 4'; Béland-Goyette (yellow card) 23'; Murrell (yellow card) 67'; Galán (yellow card) 70'; Mitter (yellow card) 87'; Petrasso 90+1' (pen.)	Report	Fisk 25'; MacNaughton 43' (yellow card) 90'; Smith (yellow card) 47'; Verhoeven (yellow card) 89'	Stadium: IG Field; Attendance: 5,411; Referee: Mathieu Souaré

August 10 6	FC Edmonton	3–1	Pacific FC	Edmonton, Alberta
3:00 pm	Diouck 32'; Ongaro 47', 66'	Report	Fisk 34'	Stadium: Clarke Stadium; Attendance: 3,745; Referee: Mathieu Souaré

August 17 7	York9 FC	0–2	Pacific FC	Toronto, Ontario
12:30 pm	Aparicio (yellow card) 33'; Gogarty (yellow card) 45+1'	Report	Blasco (yellow card) 33'; Campbell 38'; Chung (yellow card) 59'; Verhoven 90+2'	Stadium: York Lions Stadium; Attendance: 2,748; Referee: Scott Bowman

August 24 8	Pacific FC	2–1	Valour FC	Langford, British Columbia
3:00 pm	Hojabrpour (yellow card) 23'; Starostzik (yellow card) 53'; Haber 61', 81' (pen.); Baldisimo (yellow card) 89' (yellow-red card) 90'	Report	Thomas (yellow card) 52'; Petrasso 59'; Ohin (yellow card) 78'	Stadium: Westhills Stadium; Attendance: 4,381; Referee: Pierre-Luc Lauzière

August 28 9	Cavalry FC	1–1	Pacific FC	Foothills County, Alberta
6:00 pm	Oliver 34'	Report	Campbell 7'; Chung (yellow card) 82'	Stadium: ATCO Field; Attendance: 3,064; Referee: Alain Ruch

September 4 10	Pacific FC	1–1	Forge FC	Langford, British Columbia
7:00 pm	Campbell 78'	Report	Mohsen 31' (yellow card) 67'	Stadium: Westhills Stadium; Attendance: 2,124; Referee: Juan Marquez

September 11 11	Pacific FC	0–2	York9 FC	Langford, British Columbia
7:00 pm	Starostzik (yellow card) 55'	Report	Di Chiara (yellow card) 43'; Adjei 64', 83'	Stadium: Westhills Stadium; Attendance: 1,200; Referee: Nicolas Joubert

September 14 12	Pacific FC	1–0	FC Edmonton	Langford, British Columbia
12:00 pm	Chung 28'	Report	A. Zebie (yellow card) 52'; Ameobi (yellow card) 79'	Stadium: Westhills Stadium; Attendance: 2,017; Referee: Alain Ruch

September 22 13	Cavalry FC	4–1	Pacific FC	Foothills County, Alberta
12:30 pm	Escalante 12', 87'; Carducci (yellow card) 60'; Oliver 66'; Malonga 75' (pen.)	Report	McCurdy (yellow card) 21' (yellow-red card) 75'; Blasco (yellow card) 36'; Norman Jr. (yellow card) 52'; Hojabrpour (yellow card) 56'; Campbell 61' (pen.)	Stadium: ATCO Field; Attendance: 3,968; Referee: Fabrizio Stasolla

September 28 14	Forge FC	3–0	Pacific FC	Hamilton, Ontario
12:30 pm	Samuel (yellow card) 34'; Henry (yellow card) 41'; Bekker 45'; Novak (yellow card) 54'; Cissé 73'; Borges 76' (yellow card) 90+1'; Awuah (yellow card) 82'	Report	Smith (yellow card) 82'	Stadium: Tim Hortons Field; Attendance: 5,616; Referee: Pierre-Luc Lauzière

October 2 15	Pacific FC	1–1	HFX Wanderers FC	Langford, British Columbia
7:00 pm	Blasco 31'; Starostzik (yellow card) 44'; Hojabrpour (yellow card) 57'	Report	N'sa (yellow card) 51'; Garcia 80'; Lee (yellow card) 90'	Stadium: Westhills Stadium; Attendance: 2,708; Referee: David Gantar

October 9 16	HFX Wanderers FC	1–1	Pacific FC	Halifax, Nova Scotia
3:00 pm	Perea 27' (pen.); John (yellow card) 41'; Oxner (yellow card) 70'	Report	MacNaughton 13' (yellow card) 81'; González (yellow card) 36'	Stadium: Wanderers Grounds; Attendance: 6,055; Referee: Marie-Soleil Beaudoin

October 16 17	FC Edmonton	3–1	Pacific FC	Edmonton, Alberta
6:00 pm	Amanda 20'; Mortotsi (yellow card) 22'; Ongaro 25'; Temguia 79'; B. Zebie (yellow card) 90+2'	Report	Baldisimo (yellow card) 28'; Fisk 59'	Stadium: Clarke Stadium; Attendance: 2,489; Referee: Pierre-Luc Lauzière

October 19 18	Pacific FC	2–0	Valour FC	Langford, British Columbia
3:30 pm	Verhoven 12'; Norman Jr. (yellow card) 42'; Fisk 61'; Nakajima-Farran (yellow card) 90+2'	Report	Galán (yellow card) 36'; Gutiérrez (yellow card) 73'	Stadium: Westhills Stadium; Attendance: 5,103; Referee: Filip Dujic

=== Canadian Championship ===
May 15 First qualifying round	Pacific FC	0–2	Cavalry FC	Langford, British Columbia
7:30 pm	Nakajima-Farran (yellow card) 70'	Report	Waterman (yellow card) 6'; Zator 9'; Oliver 16'	Stadium: Westhills Stadium; Attendance: 2,294; Referee: Yusri Rudolph

May 22 First qualifying round	Cavalry FC	2–1 (4–1 agg.)	Pacific FC	Foothills County, Alberta
6:30 pm	Haber 2' (o.g.); Büscher 67'; Northover (yellow card) 89'	Report	Haber 73', (yellow card) 88'; Verhoven (yellow card) 89'; Baldisimo (yellow card) 90+1'	Stadium: Spruce Meadows; Attendance: 3,000; Referee: Juan Marquez

== Statistics ==
=== Squad and statistics ===
As of October 19, 2019

No.	Pos	Nat	Player	Total		CPL Spring season		CPL Fall season		Canadian Championship	
No.	Pos	Nat	Player	Apps	Goals	Apps	Goals	Apps	Goals	Apps	Goals
1	GK	(Canada) CAN	Nolan Wirth	13	0	1+0	0	11+0	0	1+0	0
3	DF	(Northern Ireland) NIR	Ryan McCurdy	12	0	5+1	0	3+1	0	2+0	0
4	DF	(United States) USA	Blake Smith	26	0	8+1	0	14+1	0	2+0	0
5	DF	(Germany) GER	Hendrik Starostzik	15	1	1+0	1	12+2	0	0+0	0
6	DF	(United States) USA	Lukas MacNaughton	22	2	7+0	0	12+1	2	2+0	0
7	DF	(Canada) CAN	Kadin Chung	25	1	9+0	0	15+0	1	1+0	0
8	MF	(Canada) CAN	Matthew Baldisimo	24	0	10+0	0	11+1	0	1+1	0
9	FW	(Canada) CAN	Marcus Haber	15	4	5+1	1	1+6	2	2+0	1
10	MF	(Canada) CAN	Ben Fisk	26	6	7+3	1	12+2	5	2+0	0
11	MF	(Canada) CAN	Issey Nakajima-Farran	19	1	1+5	1	0+11	0	2+0	0
13	MF	(Saudi Arabia) KSA	Ahmed Alghamdi	9	1	1+3	1	3+1	0	0+1	0
14	FW	(Canada) CAN	Terran Campbell	29	11	9+1	2	18+0	9	0+1	0
15	FW	(Canada) CAN	José Hernández	20	1	4+4	1	2+9	0	0+1	0
16	MF	(Canada) CAN	Zach Verhoven	24	2	1+4	0	11+6	2	1+1	0
17	DF	(Canada) CAN	Marcel de Jong	2	0	0+0	0	0+2	0	0+0	0
19	MF	(Canada) CAN	Noah Verhoeven	25	0	10+0	0	11+3	0	1+0	0
20	DF	(Canada) CAN	Émile Legault	14	0	6+1	0	4+2	0	1+0	0
21	MF	(Canada) CAN	Alessandro Hojabrpour	24	0	4+2	0	16+0	0	2+0	0
23	MF	(Spain) ESP	Víctor Blasco	26	6	7+3	3	13+2	3	0+1	0
24	MF	(Canada) CAN	David Norman Jr.	8	0	0+0	0	7+1	0	0+0	0
26	GK	(Canada) CAN	Mark Village	17	0	9+0	0	7+0	0	1+0	0
28	MF	(Panama) PAN	Alexander González	21	0	5+0	0	15+0	0	1+0	0

=== Top scorers ===
Rank	Nat.	Player	Pos.	CPL Spring season	CPL Fall season	Canadian Championship	TOTAL
1	(Canada)	Terran Campbell	FW	2	9	0	11
2	(Spain)	Víctor Blasco	MF	3	3	0	6
2	(Canada)	Ben Fisk	MF	1	5	0	6
4	(Canada)	Marcus Haber	FW	1	2	1	4
5	(United States)	Lukas MacNaughton	DF	0	2	0	2
5	(Canada)	Zach Verhoven	MF	0	2	0	2
7	(Saudi Arabia)	Ahmed Alghamdi	MF	1	0	0	1
7	(Canada)	Kadin Chung	DF	0	1	0	1
7	(Canada)	José Hernández	FW	1	0	0	1
7	(Canada)	Issey Nakajima-Farran	MF	1	0	0	1
7	(Germany)	Hendrik Starostzik	DF	1	0	0	1
Totals				11	24	1	36

Updated to match played October 19, 2019
Source: Canadian Premier League

=== Top assists ===
Rank	Nat.	Player	Pos.	CPL Spring season	CPL Fall season	Canadian Championship	TOTAL
1	(United States)	Blake Smith	DF	1	4	0	5
2	(Canada)	Ben Fisk	MF	2	2	0	4
3	(Spain)	Víctor Blasco	MF	0	3	0	3
3	(Canada)	Terran Campbell	FW	1	1	1	3
5	(Canada)	Kadin Chung	DF	1	1	0	2
5	(Canada)	José Hernández	FW	1	1	0	2
5	(Panama)	Alexander González	MF	0	2	0	2
5	(Canada)	Zach Verhoven	MF	0	2	0	2
9	(Canada)	Noah Verhoeven	MF	1	0	0	1
Totals				7	16	1	24

Updated to match played October 19, 2019
Source: Canadian Premier League

=== Clean sheets ===
Rank	Nat.	Player	CPL Spring season	CPL Fall season	Canadian Championship	TOTAL
1	(Canada)	Mark Village	2	2	0	4
2	(Canada)	Nolan Wirth	0	1	0	1
Totals			2	3	0	5

Updated to match played October 19, 2019
Source: Canadian Premier League

=== Disciplinary record ===
No.	Pos.	Nat.	Player	CPL Spring season		CPL Fall season		Canadian Championship		TOTAL	
No.	Pos.	Nat.	Player	Yellow card	Red card	Yellow card	Red card	Yellow card	Red card	Yellow card	Red card
3	DF	(Northern Ireland)	Ryan McCurdy	1	0	0	1	0	0	1	1
4	DF	(United States)	Blake Smith	1	0	2	0	0	0	3	0
5	DF	(Germany)	Hendrik Starostzik	0	0	3	0	0	0	3	0
6	DF	(United States)	Lukas MacNaughton	0	1	2	0	0	0	2	1
7	DF	(Canada)	Kadin Chung	0	0	2	0	0	0	2	0
8	MF	(Canada)	Matthew Baldisimo	3	0	2	1	1	0	6	1
9	FW	(Canada)	Marcus Haber	0	0	0	0	1	0	1	0
10	MF	(Canada)	Ben Fisk	0	0	1	0	0	0	1	0
11	MF	(Canada)	Issey Nakajima-Farran	0	0	1	0	1	0	2	0
13	MF	(Saudi Arabia)	Ahmed Alghamdi	1	0	0	0	0	0	1	0
15	FW	(Canada)	José Hernández	0	0	2	0	0	0	2	0
16	MF	(Canada)	Zach Verhoven	0	0	1	0	1	0	2	0
19	MF	(Canada)	Noah Verhoeven	1	0	1	0	0	0	2	0
20	DF	(Canada)	Émile Legault	1	0	2	0	0	0	3	0
21	MF	(Canada)	Alessandro Hojabrpour	1	0	3	0	0	0	4	0
23	MF	(Spain)	Víctor Blasco	1	0	3	0	0	0	4	0
24	MF	(Canada)	David Norman Jr.	0	0	2	0	0	0	2	0
26	GK	(Canada)	Mark Village	1	0	0	0	0	0	1	0
28	MF	(Panama)	Alexander González	2	1	1	0	0	0	3	1
Totals				13	2	28	2	4	0	45	4

Updated to match played October 19, 2019
Source: Canadian Premier League
