= 2021 Pacific FC season =

Canadian soccer club's season of play

Pacific FC
2021 season
- Chairman: Dean Shillington
- Head coach: Pa-Madou Kah
- Stadium: Starlight Stadium
- Canadian Premier League: 3rd
- CPL playoffs: Winners
- Canadian Championship: Semi-finals
- Top goalscorer: League: Terran Campbell (10); All: Terran Campbell (13)
Home colours	Away colours

The 2021 Pacific FC season was the third season in the history of Pacific FC, as well as third in the Canadian Premier League. In addition to the domestic league, the club also competed in the Canadian Championship.

On December 5, Pacific defeated two-time defending league champions Forge FC 1–0 in the 2021 Canadian Premier League final to win their first league title. As champions, they qualified for the 2022 CONCACAF League.

== Overview ==
Coming off of a 4th place finish in the shortened 2020 Canadian Premier League season, Pacific FC was able to retain most of the club's core players, while also bringing in new talent such as international attackers Ollie Bassett and Gianni dos Santos. Expectations were relatively high for the side in Pa-Modou Kah's second year leading the team.

The season began with an eight game bubble tournament in Winnipeg, dubbed "The Kickoff", before the teams moved back to their home stadiums to play out the rest of the season. The first half of the season was a huge success for Pacific, as it saw them at the top of the table and also being the highest-scoring team in the league. In the first round of the Canadian Championship, the Tridents were given a tough draw against fellow British Columbian side Vancouver Whitecaps FC of Major League Soccer, but Pacific managed to defeat them 4-3 at home in front of a sold-out crowd to advance to the next round.

Pacific qualified for the playoffs, by finishing in third place, and face 2nd place team Cavalry FC in the semifinals. They managed to defeat Cavalry 2-1 in extra time, and advanced to the final against defending champions Forge FC. In the final game in Hamilton, midfielder Alessandro Hojabrpour scored the lone goal of the game while goalkeeper Callum Irving kept a clean sheet, and Pacific won their first ever trophy.

== Squad ==
As of June 10, 2021.

No.	Player	Nationality	Position(s)	Date of birth (age)	Previous club
Goalkeepers
1	Nolan Wirth	(Canada)	GK	January 24, 1995 (aged 26)	(Canada) Victoria Highlanders
13	Callum Irving	(Canada)	GK	March 16, 1993 (aged 28)	(Canada) Ottawa Fury
Defenders
2	Kadin Chung	(Canada)	RB	September 5, 1998 (aged 23)	(Germany) Kaiserslautern II
3	Jordan Haynes	(Canada)	LB / LW	January 17, 1996 (aged 25)	(Canada) Vancouver TSS Rovers
5	Abdou Samake	(Mali)	CB	October 7, 1996 (aged 25)	(United States) University of Michigan
6	Lukas MacNaughton	(Canada)	CB	March 8, 1995 (aged 26)	(Canada) Alliance United
6	Robert Boskovic	(Canada)	CB	July 1, 1998 (aged 23)	(Canada) Toronto FC II
12	Kunle Dada-Luke	(Canada)	FB / RW	January 12, 2000 (aged 21)	(Canada) Atlético Ottawa
17	Chris Lee	(Canada)	LB	December 14, 2001 (aged 20)	(Canada) UBC Thunderbirds
26	Thomas Meilleur-Giguère	(Canada)	CB	November 13, 1997 (aged 24)	(Canada) Montreal Impact
	Duran Lee	(Canada)	CB	May 9, 1995 (aged 26)	(Canada) FC Edmonton
Midfielders
7	Víctor Blasco	(Spain)	MF	July 1, 1994 (aged 27)	(Canada) VIU Mariners
8	Matthew Baldisimo	(Canada)	DM / CM	January 20, 1998 (aged 23)	(United States) Fresno FC
11	Josh Heard	(Wales)	AM	November 29, 1994 (aged 27)	(United States) Real Monarchs
19	Matteo Polisi	(Canada)	AM / FW	April 15, 1998 (aged 23)	(Canada) SFU Athletics
20	Sean Young	(Canada)	CM	April 20, 2001 (aged 20)	(Canada) Victoria Highlanders
21	Alessandro Hojabrpour	(Canada)	AM	January 10, 2000 (aged 21)	(Bulgaria) Lokomotiv Plovdiv
22	Jamar Dixon	(Canada)	CM	June 5, 1989 (aged 32)	(Canada) Ottawa Fury
23	Ollie Bassett	(Northern Ireland)	AM	March 6, 1998 (aged 23)	(England) Nuneaton Borough
34	Manny Aparicio	(Canada)	CM	September 17, 1995 (aged 26)	(Canada) York9 FC
Forwards
9	Alejandro Díaz	(Mexico)	FW	January 27, 1996 (aged 25)	(Mexico) Club América
10	Marco Bustos	(Canada)	RW / AM	April 22, 1996 (aged 25)	(Canada) Valour FC
14	Terran Campbell	(Canada)	LW / ST	October 10, 1998 (aged 23)	(United States) Fresno FC
24	Gianni dos Santos	(Netherlands)	CF	November 21, 1998 (aged 23)	(Netherlands) FC Dordrecht

== Transfers ==
=== In ===
No.	Pos.	Player	From club	Fee/notes	Date	Source
34	MF	(Canada) Manny Aparicio	(Canada) York9 FC	Free transfer	November 6, 2020	
19	MF	(Canada) Matteo Polisi	(Canada) SFU Athletics	Free transfer	February 25, 2021	
12	DF	(Canada) Kunle Dada-Luke	(Canada) Atlético Ottawa	Free transfer	March 11, 2021	
	DF	(Canada) Duran Lee	(Canada) FC Edmonton	Free transfer	March 18, 2021	
23	MF	(Northern Ireland) Ollie Bassett	(England) Nuneaton Borough	Free transfer	April 29, 2021	
24	FW	(Netherlands) Gianni dos Santos	(Netherlands) FC Dordrecht	Free transfer	May 20, 2021	
17	DF	(Canada) Chris Lee	(Canada) UBC Thunderbirds	Selected 5th overall in the 2021 CPL–U Sports Draft	June 10, 2021	

==== Draft picks ====
Pacific FC selected the following players in the 2021 CPL–U Sports Draft on January 29, 2021. Draft picks are not automatically signed to the team roster. Only those who are signed to a contract will be listed as transfers in.

Round	Selection	Pos.	Player	Nationality	University
1	5	DF	Chris Lee	Canada	UBC Thunderbirds
2	12	FW	Victory Shumbusho	DR Congo	UBC Thunderbirds

=== Out ===
No.	Pos.	Player	To club	Fee/notes	Date	Source
16	MF	(Canada) Zach Verhoven	(Canada) Atlético Ottawa	Contract expired	October 29, 2020	
19	MF	(Canada) Noah Verhoeven	(Canada) York United	Contract expired	February 4, 2021	
17	DF	(Canada) Marcel de Jong	Retired		March 5, 2021	

==== Loans Out ====
No.	Pos.	Player	Loaned to	Fee/notes	Date	Source
	GK	(Canada) Emil Gazdov	(Germany) FC Nürnberg	Loaned until June 2022	October 7, 2020	

== Competitions ==
=== Canadian Premier League ===
==== Table ====
Pos	Team	Pld	W	D	L	GF	GA	GD	Pts	Qualification
1	Forge (S)	28	16	2	10	39	24	+15	50	Advance to playoffs
2	Cavalry	28	14	8	6	34	30	+4	50	Advance to playoffs
3	Pacific (C)	28	13	6	9	47	34	+13	45	Advance to playoffs
4	York United	28	8	12	8	35	39	−4	36	Advance to playoffs
5	Valour	28	10	5	13	38	36	+2	35	
6	HFX Wanderers	28	8	11	9	28	34	−6	35	
7	FC Edmonton	28	6	10	12	34	41	−7	28	
8	Atlético Ottawa	28	6	8	14	30	47	−17	26	

Updated to match(es) played on unknown. Source: CanPL.ca
Rules for classification: 1) points; 2) total wins.
(C) Champions; (S) Regular season winner

==== Results by match ====
Match	1	2	3	4	5	6	7	8	9	10	11	12	13	14	15	16	17	18	19	20	21	22	23	24	25	26	27	28
Result	W	D	L	W	W	D	L	W	W	W	D	D	W	L	W	W	W	D	D	L	W	L	L	W	L	W	L	L
Position	1	3	4	3	2	2	3	2	2	1	1	1	1	2	1	1	1	1	1	1	1	1	1	1	2	1	1	3

Source: #Matches
W = Win; D = Draw; L = Loss

==== Matches ====
June 26 1	Pacific FC	2–0	HFX Wanderers FC	Winnipeg, Manitoba
2:00 pm	Bustos 17'; Bassett 37'; Heard (yellow card) 60'; Chung (yellow card) 70'; Lee (yellow card) 79'	Report	Morelli (yellow card) 72'	Stadium: IG Field; Attendance: 0 Referee: Fabrizio Stasolla

July 1 2	York United FC	2–2	Pacific FC	Winnipeg, Manitoba
2:00 pm	Abzi (yellow card) 2', (goal) 32'; Mohammed (yellow card) 26'; Petrasso (yellow card) 43'; Johnston (yellow card) 74'; Wilson 82'; C. N'sa (yellow card) 88'	Report	Campbell (yellow card) 36'; Aparicio (yellow card) 45'; Heard 51'; C. N'sa 67' (o.g.); Bustos (yellow card) 86'	Stadium: IG Field; Attendance: 0 Referee: Alain Ruch

July 4 3	Forge FC	3–0	Pacific FC	Winnipeg, Manitoba
4:00 pm	Sabak (yellow card) 8'; Metusala (yellow card) 24'; Awuah (yellow card) 45'; Babouli 70'; Nanco 75'; Borges 80' (pen.)	Report	Bustos (yellow card) 74'	Stadium: IG Field; Attendance: 0 Referee: Carly Shaw-MacLaren

July 7 4	Atlético Ottawa	0–1	Pacific FC	Winnipeg, Manitoba
4:00 pm		Report	Hojabrpour (yellow card) 36'; Young (yellow card) 54'; Heard 63'	Stadium: IG Field; Attendance: 0 Referee: Filip Dujic

July 10 5	Pacific FC	3–0	York United FC	Winnipeg, Manitoba
2:00 pm	Polisi 6'; Bustos 9', 53'; Dixon (yellow card) 60'; Haynes (yellow card) 74'	Report	Abzi (yellow card) 28'; Johnston (yellow card) 58'	Stadium: IG Field; Attendance: 0 Referee: Juan Marquez

July 13 6	HFX Wanderers FC	0–0	Pacific FC	Winnipeg, Manitoba
5:00 pm		Report	Heard (yellow card) 17'; Hojabrpour (yellow card) 58'; Polisi (yellow card) 85'	Stadium: IG Field; Attendance: 0 Referee: Alain Ruch

July 17 7	Pacific FC	1–2	Forge FC	Winnipeg, Manitoba
10:00 pm	Polisi (yellow card) 26'; MacNaughton (yellow card) 43'; Dixon (yellow card) 56'; Heard 77'; Young (yellow card) 81'; Samake (yellow card) 90+2'	Report	Samuel (yellow card) 5'; Sabak 22' (pen.); Bekker 30'; Navarro (yellow card) 78'; Tissot (yellow card) 82'	Stadium: IG Field; Attendance: 0 Referee: Juan Marquez

July 21 8	Pacific FC	4–2	Atlético Ottawa	Winnipeg, Manitoba
7:00 pm	Díaz 35' (pen.), 52', 55'; Polisi (yellow card) 40'; Bustos (yellow card) 59'; Haynes (yellow card) 59'; Hojabrpour (yellow card) 71'; Campbell 74'; Young (yellow card) 77'	Report	Shaw 2', 15'; McKendry (red card) 22'; Kapor (yellow card) 34'; Shaw (yellow card) 38'	Stadium: IG Field; Attendance: 0 Referee: Ben Hoskins

July 30 9	Pacific FC	2–0	Cavalry FC	Langford, British Columbia
6:30 pm	Bustos 3'; Blasco (yellow card) 14'; MacNaughton (yellow card) 45'; Baldisimo (yellow card) 79'; dos Santos 86'; Heard (yellow card) 90+3'	Report	Loturi (yellow card) 19'; Ledgerwood (yellow card) 24'; Novak (yellow card) 66'	Stadium: Starlight Stadium; Referee: Carly Shaw-MacLaren

August 4 10	Pacific FC	2–1	Valour FC	Langford, British Columbia
6:30 pm	Dixon (yellow card) 4'; Hojabrpour (yellow card) 44'; Heard (yellow card) 48'; MacNaughton 66'; Irving (red card) 76'; Bustos 87'	Report	Ulloa (yellow card) 7'; Romeo 41'; Akio (yellow card) 46'; Romeo (yellow card) 54'	Stadium: Starlight Stadium; Referee: Mathieu Souaré

August 7 11	Pacific FC	2–2	FC Edmonton	Langford, British Columbia
3:30 pm	Bassett (yellow card) 15'; Polisi 42'; Campbell 87'	Report	Đidić (yellow card) 35'; Ongaro 58'; Aird (yellow card) 62'; Shome (yellow card) 65'; Warschewski 76'; Warschewski (yellow card) 83'	Stadium: Starlight Stadium; Attendance: 2,259; Referee: Carly Shaw-MacLaren

August 11 12	Cavalry FC	0–0	Pacific FC	Foothills County, Alberta
6:00 pm	Simmons (yellow card) 31'; Novak (yellow card) 51'	Report	Dixon (yellow card) 16'; Heard (yellow card) 30'; dos Santos (yellow card) 90+5'	Stadium: ATCO Field; Attendance: 2,394; Referee: Juan Marquez

August 16 13	Valour FC	0–2	Pacific FC	Winnipeg, Manitoba
5:00 pm	Peña (yellow card) 27'; Ohin (yellow card) 64'	Report	Díaz 29'; Aparicio (yellow card) 34'; MacNaughton (yellow card) 50'; Haynes (yellow card) 66'; Campbell 73', (yellow card) 90+2'	Stadium: IG Field; Attendance: 2,736; Referee: Alain Ruch

August 20 14	Pacific FC	1–2	Cavalry FC	Langford, British Columbia
6:30 pm	Hojabrpour (yellow card) 79'; dos Santos (red card) 83'; Campbell 83' (pen.); Heard (yellow card) 90+2'	Report	Mason (yellow card) 17', (goal) 23', 29'; Klomp (yellow card) 70'; Escalante (yellow card) 83'; Yao (yellow card) 90+2'	Stadium: Starlight Stadium; Attendance: 2,740; Referee: David Barrie

August 29 15	Pacific FC	3–2	Valour FC	Langford, British Columbia
3:30 pm	Díaz 11'; Polisi 22'; Campbell 35'; MacNaughton (yellow card) 43'; Aparicio (yellow card) 60'; Hojabrpour (yellow card) 86'	Report	Ricci 17'; Ohin (yellow card) 61'; Romeo (yellow card) 65'; Mikhael (yellow card) 74'; Alemán 86' (pen.)	Stadium: Starlight Stadium; Attendance: 2,621; Referee: Alain Ruch

September 4 16	FC Edmonton	1–2	Pacific FC	Edmonton, Alberta
6:00 pm	Aird (yellow card) 54'; Ongaro 72'	Report	Dixon (red card) 14'; Díaz 28'; Chung 34'	Stadium: Clarke Stadium; Attendance: 1,352

September 9 17	Pacific FC	3–1	Cavalry FC	Langford, British Columbia
7:00 pm	Aparicio (yellow card) 40', (goal) 89'; Campbell 45+1'; Bassett 66'; Chung (yellow card) 76'	Report	Camargo 32'; Mason (yellow card) 60'; Escalante (yellow card) 76'	Stadium: Starlight Stadium; Attendance: 2,350

September 14 18	FC Edmonton	1–1	Pacific FC	Edmonton, Alberta
7:00 pm	Ongaro 57'	Report	Heard (yellow card) 59'; Dixon (yellow card) 77'; MacNaughton 90+2'	Stadium: Clarke Stadium; Attendance: 670

September 19 19	Pacific FC	1–1	Atlético Ottawa	Langford, British Columbia
2:00 pm	Heard (yellow card) 71'; Bassett (yellow card) 80'; Campbell 86'	Report	Wright 19'; Verhoven (yellow card) 51'; Acosta (yellow card) 58'; Mannella (yellow card) 67'; McKendry (yellow card) 90+1'	Stadium: Starlight Stadium; Attendance: 2,721; Referee: Voja Sremcevic

September 25 20	Forge FC	2–1	Pacific FC	Hamilton, Ontario
4:00 pm	Babouli 6'; Bekker (yellow card) 76'; Browne 80'; Krutzen (yellow card) 83'; Pacius (yellow card) 90+3'	Report	Díaz 38'; MacNaughton (yellow card) 90+2'	Stadium: Tim Hortons Field; Referee: Fabrizio Stasolla

September 29 21	Valour FC	1–3	Pacific FC	Winnipeg, Manitoba
4:45 pm	Romeo (yellow card) 2'; Dyer 30', (yellow card) 41'; Ulloa (yellow card) 79'	Report	Diaz 3' (pen.), 45+2'; Samake (yellow card) 57'; Blasco 69'; dos Santos (yellow card) 86'	Stadium: IG Field

October 6 22	FC Edmonton	2–1	Pacific FC	Edmonton, Alberta
6:00 pm	Gonzalez 30', (yellow card) 52'; Ongaro 38'; Gee (yellow card) 43'; Aird (yellow card) 57'; Zebie (yellow card) 90+1'	Report	Hojabrpour 48', (yellow card) 49'; McNaughton (yellow card) 52'	Stadium: Clarke Stadium; Referee: Nicolas Joubert

October 11 23	HFX Wanderers FC	1–0	Pacific FC	Halifax, Nova Scotia
10:00 am	Bent (yellow card) 2'; Lamothe (yellow card) 7'; Samake 83' (o.g.); Camara (yellow card) 90+3'	Report	Haynes (yellow card) 43'	Stadium: Wanderers Grounds; Referee: David Gantar

October 16 24	Pacific FC	3–2	Valour FC	Langford, British Columbia
3:00 pm	Heard 9'; Campbell 23'; Campbell 49'; Samake (yellow card) 74'	Report	Fordyce 14'; Cebara (yellow card) 34'; Ulloa (yellow card) 55'; Akio 49'	Stadium: Starlight Stadium; Attendance: 3,214; Referee: Voja Sremcevic

October 21 25	Cavalry FC	2–1	Pacific FC	Foothills County, Alberta
6:00 pm	Klomp 6', (yellow card) 32'; Norman Jr. 71'	Report	Díaz (yellow card) 32'; Hojabrpour (yellow card) 71'; Young 89'; MacNaughton (yellow card) 90+3'	Stadium: ATCO Field; Attendance: 2,082; Referee: Pierre-Luc Lauzière

October 26 26	Pacific FC	5–1	FC Edmonton	Langford, British Columbia
7:30 pm	Díaz 6'; Aparicio 20', 51', (yellow card) 57'; Basset (yellow card) 27'; Bustos 41', 69' (pen.); Campbell (yellow card) 56'	Report	James (yellow card) 69'; Aird 78' (pen.)	Stadium: Starlight Stadium; Attendance: 2,548; Referee: Fabrizio Stasolla

October 30 27	Pacific FC	1–2	York United FC	Langford, British Columbia
3:00 pm	Dada-Luke (yellow card) 43'; Campbell 49'; Heard (yellow card) 51'; Aparicio (yellow card) 69'; MacNaughton (yellow card) 71'; dos Santos (red card) 83'	Report	Ferrari (yellow card) 20'; Campagna (yellow card) 35'; Ulbricht 56'; Johnston (yellow card) 63'; Wright 81'; Toussaint (yellow card) 89'	Stadium: Starlight Stadium; Referee: Alain Ruch

November 7 28	Cavalry FC	1–0	Pacific FC	Foothills County, Alberta
12:30 pm	Mason 16'; Norman Jr. (yellow card) 42'; Trafford (yellow card) 80'	Report	Chung (yellow card) 24'; Dada-Luke (yellow card) 26'; Dixon (yellow card) 33'; Aparicio (yellow card) 36'	Stadium: ATCO Field; Attendance: 2,408; Referee: David Gantar

==== Playoff matches ====
November 20 Semi-final	Cavalry FC	1–2 (a.e.t.)	Pacific FC	Calgary, Alberta
12:00pm	Yao 47'; Escalante (yellow card) 90+1'	Report	Campbell 33'; Heard (yellow card) 52'; Blasco (yellow card) 97'; Carducci 105' (o.g.)	Stadium: ATCO Field; Attendance: 2,927; Referee: Pierre-Luc Lauzière

December 5 2021 CPL Final	Forge FC	0–1	Pacific FC	Hamilton, Ontario
1:30pm	Browne (yellow card) 17' (yellow-red card) 90+1'; Cissé (yellow card) 58'; Sabak (yellow card) 90+2'	Report	Meilleur-Giguère (yellow card) 31'; Hojabrpour 59' (yellow card) 90+2'; Young (yellow card) 90+2'	Stadium: Tim Hortons Field; Attendance: 7,488; Referee: Yusri Rudolf

=== Canadian Championship ===
August 26 Preliminary round	Pacific FC	4–3	Vancouver Whitecaps FC	Langford, British Columbia
7:00 pm PT	Campbell 8' (pen.), (yellow card) 43'; Aparicio (yellow card) 16', (goal) 28'; Heard 63'; Díaz 76'; Haynes (yellow card) 90+1'; Blasco (yellow card) 90+7'	Report	Nerwinski (yellow card) 8'; Gauld 14', 66'; Rose (yellow card) 75'; Dájome (penalty missed) 90+8', 90+8'	Stadium: Starlight Stadium; Attendance: 4,997; Referee: Juan Marquez

September 22 Quarter-finals	Cavalry FC	0–1	Pacific FC	Foothills County, Alberta
8:00pm MT	Escalante (yellow card) 33'		Campbell 33'; Díaz (yellow card) 35'; Young (yellow card) 90+2'	Stadium: ATCO Field; Referee: Alain Ruch

November 3 Semi-finals	Toronto FC	2–1	Pacific FC	Toronto, Ontario
7:30pm ET	Altidore 15'; Shaffelburg 26'; Laryea (yellow card) 78'	Report	Samake (yellow card) 35'; Aparicio (yellow card) 41'; Heard (yellow card) 62'; Hojabrpour (yellow card) 74'; Dixon (yellow card) 74'; Díaz 83'	Stadium: BMO Field; Attendance: 5,131; Referee: Pierre-Luc Lauzière

== Statistics ==
No.	Pos	Nat	Name	Total			Canadian Premier League			Canadian Championship		
No.	Pos	Nat	Name	Apps	Goals	Assists	Apps	Goals	Assists	Apps	Goals	Assists
2	DF	(Canada)	Kadin Chung	29	1	2	26	1	1	3	0	1
3	DF	(Canada)	Jordan Haynes	29	0	1	26	0	1	3	0	0
5	DF	(Mali)	Abdou Samake	28	0	2	25	0	1	3	0	1
6	DF	(United States)	Lukas MacNaughton	29	2	1	26	2	1	3	0	0
7	FW	(Spain)	Víctor Blasco	17	1	1	14	1	1	3	0	0
8	MF	(Philippines)	Matthew Baldisimo	7	0	0	6	0	0	1	0	0
9	FW	(Mexico)	Alejandro Díaz	31	12	4	28	10	4	3	2	0
10	FW	(Canada)	Marco Bustos	18	7	6	17	7	6	1	0	0
11	FW	(Wales)	Josh Heard	29	5	2	26	4	1	3	1	1
12	DF	(Canada)	Kunle Dada-Luke	23	0	2	21	0	2	2	0	0
14	FW	(Canada)	Terran Campbell	30	13	6	28	11	5	2	2	1
17	DF	(Canada)	Chris Lee	3	0	0	3	0	0	0	0	0
18	DF	(Canada)	Robert Boskovic	5	0	0	5	0	0	0	0	0
19	MF	(Canada)	Matteo Polisi	22	3	1	22	3	1	0	0	0
20	MF	(Canada)	Sean Young	28	1	0	26	1	0	2	0	0
21	MF	(Canada)	Alessandro Hojabrpour	29	2	2	26	2	2	3	0	0
22	MF	(Canada)	Jamar Dixon	29	0	0	26	0	0	3	0	0
23	FW	(Northern Ireland)	Ollie Bassett	20	2	3	20	2	3	0	0	0
24	FW	(Cape Verde)	Gianni dos Santos	20	1	2	17	1	2	3	0	0
26	DF	(Canada)	Thomas Meilleur-Giguère	12	0	0	10	0	0	2	0	0
28	MF	(Canada)	Paul Amedume	2	0	0	2	0	0	0	0	0
34	MF	(Canada)	Manny Aparicio	25	4	3	22	3	3	3	1	0

=== Goalkeepers ===
No.	Nat	Name	Total			Canadian Premier League			Canadian Championship		
No.	Nat	Name	Apps	Conceded	Shutouts	Apps	Conceded	Shutouts	Apps	Conceded	Shutouts
1	(Canada)	Nolan Wirth	3	3	0	3	3	0	0	0	0
13	(Canada)	Callum Irving	30	34	9	27	29	8	3	5	1
31	(Canada)	Isaac Boehmer	1	2	0	1	2	0	0	0	0
