= Lukas MacNaughton =

Canadian soccer player (born 1995)

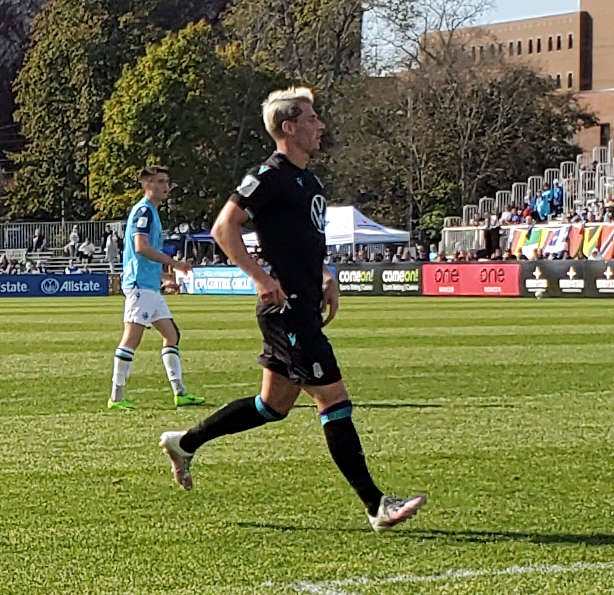
- MacNaughton with Pacific FC in 2021

Personal information
- Full name: Lukas Michael MacNaughton
- Date of birth: March 8, 1995 (age 31)
- Place of birth: New York City, New York, US
- Height: 1.85 m (6 ft 1 in)
- Position: Defender

Team information
- Current team: St. Louis City SC
- Number: 5

Youth career
- 2002–2011: Royale Union Rixensartoise

College career
Years	Team	Apps	(Gls)
2013–2017	Toronto Varsity Blues	63	(17)

Senior career*
Years	Team	Apps	(Gls)
2016–2017	North Toronto Nitros	9	(4)
2018	Alliance United	8	(0)
2019–2021	Pacific FC	53	(5)
2022–2023	Toronto FC	28	(0)
2023–2024	Nashville SC	20	(1)
2025	D.C. United	11	(1)
2026–	St. Louis City SC	29	(3)
2026–	→ St. Louis City 2 (loan)	1	(0)

International career^{‡}
2015–2017	Canada Universiade	10	(1)
2022	Canada	1	(0)
- * Club domestic league appearances and goals as of November 7, 2026 ‡ National team caps and goals as of November 11, 2022

Lukas Michael MacNaughton (born March 8, 1995) is a professional soccer player who plays as a defender for Major League Soccer club St. Louis City SC. Born in the United States, he plays for the Canada national team.

== Early life ==
MacNaughton was born in New York City to a Canadian father born in Montreal, Canada and an Austrian mother born in Beirut, Lebanon. When he was seven, he moved to Brussels, Belgium with his family. He played youth soccer with Royale Union Rixensartoise from under-8, until the age of 16, after which he left the club and then played for his school team, International School of Brussels.

== College career ==
After attending high school at the International School of Brussels, he moved to Canada to attend the University of Toronto, where he also played for the Toronto Varsity Blues men's soccer team from 2013 to 2017, serving as team captain beginning in his second year. He scored his first goal on September 3, 2014, against the Ontario Tech Ridgebacks. He was named an OUA East first-team all-star four times from 2014 to 2017, a CIS second team all-Canadian in 2015, and U Sports second team all-Canadian in 2017. He led the team in goals in 2016. After playing for UofT, he had a trial with Toronto FC II.

== Club career ==
In 2016 and 2017, MacNaughton played his summer soccer with League1 Ontario side North Toronto Nitros, making a total of nine appearances and scoring four goals over two seasons.

In 2018, MacNaughton played for League1 Ontario side Alliance United FC, making eight appearances.

MacNaughton signed for Canadian Premier League club Pacific FC in March 2019. He made his debut in Pacific FC's inaugural match as a starter and received two yellow cards, becoming the club's first ever sent off player in a 1–0 victory over HFX Wanderers. MacNaughton scored his first goal for Pacific FC on July 31, netting a header against Valour FC in an eventual 2–2 draw. He made twenty league appearances that season, scoring two goals, and made two appearances in the Canadian Championship. On January 17, 2020, MacNaughton re-signed with Pacific for the 2020 season. In November 2020, he once again re-signed for the 2021 season.

On January 25, 2022, MacNaughton transferred to MLS side Toronto FC on a two-year contract, with club options for 2024 and 2025, for a rumoured transfer fee of $175k. He made his debut on March 5, coming on as a substitute in a 4–1 loss to the New York Red Bulls. He scored his first goal for Toronto FC on July 26 in the 2022 Canadian Championship Final against Vancouver Whitecaps FC.

On April 25, 2023, MacNaughton was traded to Nashville SC, along with up to $200,000 of general allocation money, for forward CJ Sapong. He made his debut on May 6 against the Chicago Fire. Macnaughton scored his first goal for his new club on May 17, netting the second in an eventual 2–1 victory over Inter Miami. In November 2023 Nashville announced they had exercised MacNaughton's contract option, keeping him at the club.

In late December 2024, MacNaughton was traded to D.C. United in exchange for $150,000 in General Allocation Money and $50,000 in conditional General Allocation Money, with Nashville also retaining a sell-on clause. On November 26, 2025, the team announced that they had declined his contract option.

In February 2026, he signed with St. Louis City SC through June 2027, with an option for the 2027–28 MLS season.

== International career ==
MacNaughton was born in the United States to a Canadian father and an Austrian mother.

He represented Canada at the 2015 FISU Universiade Games and 2017 FISU Universiade Games. He scored against Brazil during the 2017 Games.

MacNaughton was called up to the Canada men's national soccer team for the first time in November 2022, for a friendly against Bahrain ahead of the 2022 World Cup. On November 11, he made his debut for the team, coming on as a substitute. He travelled and trained with the team at the 2022 FIFA World Cup, although was not an official member of the 26 man roster.

== Personal life ==
He works as a model for Sutherland Models. He graduated from the University of Toronto with a degree in architecture and worked as an architect for a few months before joining Pacific FC.

== Career statistics ==
=== Club ===
As of match played November 7, 2026

Appearances and goals by club, season and competition
Club	Season	League			Playoffs		National cup		Continental		Other		Total	
Club	Season	Division	Apps	Goals	Apps	Goals	Apps	Goals	Apps	Goals	Apps	Goals	Apps	Goals
North Toronto Nitros	2016	League1 Ontario	5	2	—		—		—		0	0	5	2
North Toronto Nitros	2017	League1 Ontario	4	2	—		—		—		0	0	4	2
North Toronto Nitros	Total		9	4	0	0	0	0	0	0	0	0	9	4
Alliance United FC	2018	League1 Ontario	8	0	2	0	—		—		0	0	10	0
Pacific FC	2019	Canadian Premier League	20	2	—		2	0	—		—		22	2
Pacific FC	2020	Canadian Premier League	8	1	—		—		—		—		8	1
Pacific FC	2021	Canadian Premier League	25	2	1	0	3	0	—		—		29	2
Pacific FC	Total		53	5	1	0	5	0	0	0	0	0	59	5
Toronto FC	2022	Major League Soccer	25	0	—		3 (Note: Includes appearance in 2020 Canadian Championship final (played in 2022))	1	—		—		28	1
Toronto FC	2023	Major League Soccer	3	0	—		0	0	—		—		3	0
Toronto FC	Total		28	0	0	0	3	1	0	0	0	0	31	1
Nashville SC	2023	Major League Soccer	14	1	2	0	1	0	—		7 (Note: Appearances in Leagues Cup)	0	24	1
Nashville SC	2024	Major League Soccer	6	0	—		—		4 (Note: Appearances in CONCACAF Champions Cup)	0	0	0	10	0
Nashville SC	Total		20	1	2	0	1	0	4	0	0	0	34	1
D.C. United	2025	Major League Soccer	11	1	—		0	0	—		—		11	1
St. Louis City SC	2026	Major League Soccer	29	3	0	0	5	0	—		—		34	3
St. Louis City 2 (loan)	2026	MLS Next Pro	1	0	—		—		—		—		1	0
Career total			159	14	5	0	14	1	4	0	7	0	189	15

=== International ===
As of match played November 11, 2022

Appearances and goals by national team and year
National team	Year	Apps	Goals
Canada	2022	1	0
Total		1	0

== Honours ==
Pacific FC

- Canadian Premier League: 2021

Toronto FC

- Canadian Championship: 2020

St. Louis City SC

- U.S. Open Cup: 2026
