= Nolan Wirth =

Canadian soccer player (born 1995)

Personal information
- Full name: Nolan Wirth
- Date of birth: January 24, 1995 (age 31)
- Place of birth: Comox, British Columbia, Canada
- Height: 1.85 m (6 ft 1 in)
- Position: Goalkeeper

Youth career
- 2006–2009: Comox Valley United
- 2009–2011: Upper Vancouver Island United
- 2011–2013: Vancouver Whitecaps FC

College career
Years	Team	Apps	(Gls)
2014–2016	Oregon State Beavers	33	(0)

Senior career*
Years	Team	Apps	(Gls)
2015	Calgary Foothills	4	(0)
2016	Victoria Highlanders	4	(0)
2017	Phoenix Rising	0	(0)
2018	Victoria Highlanders	8	(0)
2019–2021	Pacific FC	19	(0)
Total		35	(0)

International career^{‡}
2015	Canada U20	3	(0)
- * Club domestic league appearances and goals as of September 24, 2021 ‡ National team caps and goals as of July 1, 2019

Nolan Wirth (born January 24, 1995) is a Canadian former professional soccer player.

== Early career ==
Wirth began playing soccer in 2006 with Comox Valley United before joining Upper Vancouver Island United in 2009. In 2011, he joined the residency program of professional club Vancouver Whitecaps FC.

== College career ==
From 2014 to 2016, he attended Oregon State University, where he played for the men's soccer team.

== Club career ==
During the NCAA offseason, he played for Calgary Foothills FC in the Premier Development League in 2015. In 2016, he played with the Victoria Highlanders in the PDL.

In 2017, he attended preseason training camp with Whitecaps FC 2, but ultimately did not sign with the team. On June 9, 2017, Wirth signed his first professional contract with American USL side Phoenix Rising. He made two appearances on the bench for Phoenix that season, but failed to make his debut.

In 2018, Wirth returned to Canada and signed with Premier Development League side Victoria Highlanders.

On February 26, 2019, Wirth signed with Canadian Premier League side Pacific FC becoming the first native Vancouver Islander to sign with the team. On May 16, 2019, he made his debut for Pacific in the Canadian Championship against Cavalry FC. On July 1, 2019, Wirth made his league debut in a 3–1 win over Cavalry FC. On January 17, 2020, Wirth re-signed with Pacific for the 2020 season. He once again re-signed for the 2021 season. In early September 2021, he was granted a leave of absence from the club. On September 24, 2021, Wirth retired from professional soccer, so he could complete his degree from Oregon State and pursue a career outside of soccer.

== International career ==
In 2013, Wirth represented Canada for the first time at the 2013 Torneo COTIF. He was a regular fixture at Canada U20 camps in the lead-up to the 2015 CONCACAF U-20 Championship, where he made three appearances.

== Honours ==
=== Club ===
Pacific FC

- Canadian Premier League: 2021

== Career statistics ==
As of match played on August 8, 2021

Club	Season	League			Playoffs		Domestic Cup		Total	
Club	Season	Division	Apps	Goals	Apps	Goals	Apps	Goals	Apps	Goals
Calgary Foothills	2015	PDL	4	0	—		—		4	0
Victoria Highlanders	2016	PDL	4	0	—		—		4	0
Phoenix Rising	2017	USL	0	0	0	0	0	0	0	0
Victoria Highlanders	2018	PDL	8	0	—		—		8	0
Pacific FC	2019	Canadian Premier League	12	0	—		1	0	13	0
Pacific FC	2020	Canadian Premier League	4	0	—		—		4	0
Pacific FC	2021	Canadian Premier League	3	0	0	0	0	0	3	0
Pacific FC	Total		19	0	0	0	1	0	20	0
Career total			35	0	0	0	1	0	36	0
