= Sean Young (soccer) =

Canadian soccer player (born 2001)

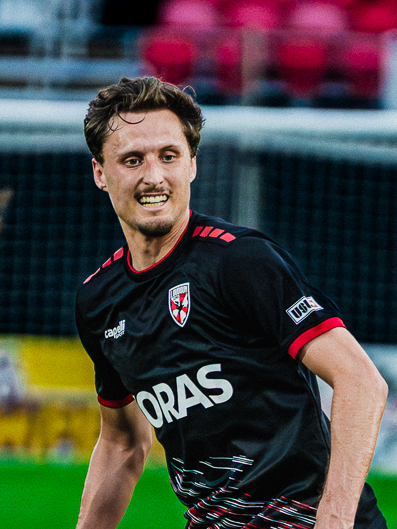
- Young with Loudoun United FC in 2026

Personal information
- Date of birth: April 20, 2001 (age 25)
- Place of birth: Victoria, British Columbia, Canada
- Height: 1.88 m (6 ft 2 in)
- Positions: Midfielder; centre-back

Team information
- Current team: Loudoun United
- Number: 20

Youth career
- Bays United FC
- Vancouver Island Wave
- Victoria Highlanders

Senior career*
Years	Team	Apps	(Gls)
2019	Victoria Highlanders	12	(1)
2020–2025	Pacific FC	135	(10)
2026–	Loudoun United	15	(1)
- * Club domestic league appearances and goals as of November 7, 2026

Sean Young (born April 20, 2001) is a Canadian professional soccer player who plays as a midfielder for Loudoun United FC in the USL Championship.

== Early life ==
Young played youth soccer with Bays United FC, later joining the Vancouver Island Wave, winning the U16 provincial title with the team in 2017. In 2018, he played with the Victoria Highlanders reserves in the Pacific Coast Soccer League, scoring one goal and helping them finish second in the division. During the 2018-19 season, he played at the senior amateur level with Westcastle United in the Vancouver Island Soccer League, helping them win the 2019 Jackson Cup, for the club's first ever championship.

== Club career ==
In April 2019, he signed with Victoria Highlanders FC first team in USL League Two. He made twelve appearances that season and scored a goal against Portland Timbers U23s on May 19, 2019.

In July 2020, after training with the club since June, he signed a professional contract with Pacific FC of the Canadian Premier League, becoming the first local player to sign a contract with the club. He made his professional debut on August 18, 2020, in a substitute appearance against York9. After the season, he extended his contract for the 2021 season. He scored his first professional goal on October 21, 2021, against Cavalry FC. After winning the league title with Pacific in 2021, he extended his contract once again for the 2022 season. In November 2022, he once again extended his contract with the club for another season. In May 2023, he was named the CPL Player of the Month. That season, he began to attract transfer interest from Major League Soccer clubs. In January 2024, the club picked up his option for the 2024 season. In April 2024, he signed a two-year extension, through the 2026 season with an option for 2027. On April 19, he would become the first player in club history to reach 100 appearances for the club, across all competitions, scoring a goal in the match against Valour FC.

On February 4 2026, Young joined USL Championship side Loudoun United FC on a transfer from Pacific FC and signed a two-year contract through the 2027 season.

== Career statistics ==
As of September 5, 2026

Club	Season	League			Playoffs		Domestic Cup		Continental		Total	
Club	Season	Division	Apps	Goals	Apps	Goals	Apps	Goals	Apps	Goals	Apps	Goals
Victoria Highlanders FC	2022	USL League Two	12	1	–		–		–		12	1
Pacific FC	2020	Canadian Premier League	9	0	–		–		–		9	0
Pacific FC	2021	Canadian Premier League	24	1	2	0	2	0	–		28	1
Pacific FC	2022	Canadian Premier League	23	1	2	0	0	0	4	0	29	1
Pacific FC	2023	Canadian Premier League	26	4	3	0	3	0	–		32	4
Pacific FC	2024	Canadian Premier League	28	2	1	0	5	0	–		34	2
Pacific FC	2025	Canadian Premier League	25	2	–		0	0	–		25	2
Pacific FC	Total		135	10	8	0	10	0	4	0	157	10
Loudoun United	2026	USL Championship	11	1	0	0	3	0	0	0	14	1
Career total			158	12	8	0	13	0	4	0	183	12

== Honours ==
Pacific FC

- Canadian Premier League: 2021
