= Mark Village =

Canadian soccer coach and former player (born 1991)

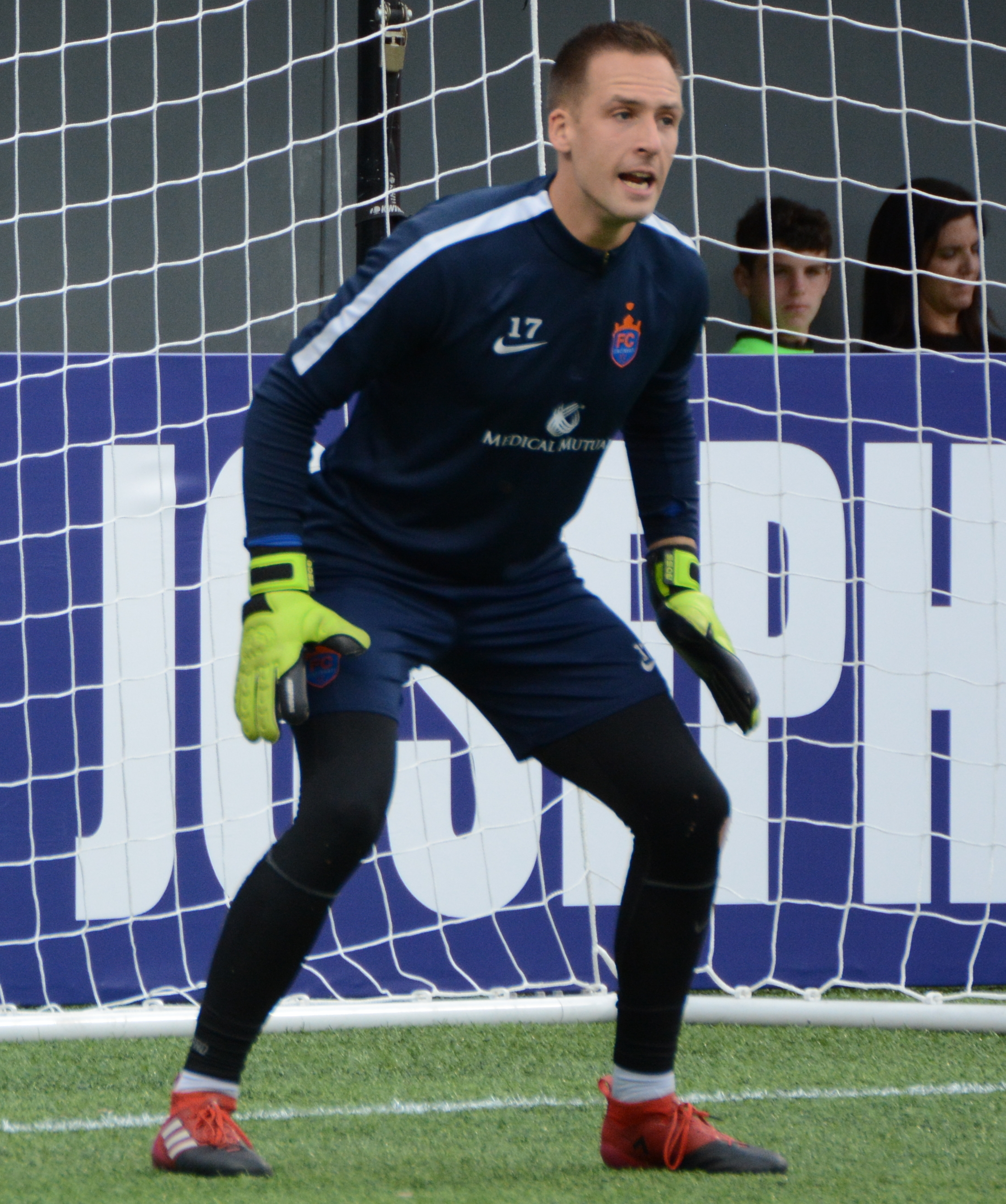
- Village warming up with FC Cincinnati in 2018

Personal information
- Date of birth: November 25, 1991 (age 34)
- Place of birth: Abbotsford, British Columbia, Canada
- Height: 1.88 m (6 ft 2 in)
- Position: Goalkeeper

Youth career
- Abbotsford Mariners

College career
Years	Team	Apps	(Gls)
2011–2014	UFV Cascades	46	(0)

Senior career*
Years	Team	Apps	(Gls)
2012	Fraser Valley Mariners	15	(0)
2015–2017	Whitecaps FC 2	1	(0)
2018	FC Cincinnati	0	(0)
2019	Pacific FC	16	(0)
2020–2022	Pacific FC	0	(0)
Total		32	(0)

Managerial career
- 2020–2022: Pacific FC (goalkeepers)
- 2023–2024: Vancouver FC (goalkeepers)
- * Club domestic league appearances and goals as of November 4, 2022

Mark Village (born November 25, 1991) is a Canadian soccer coach and former player.

== Early life ==
Village played youth soccer with the Abbotsford Mariners. He began playing goalkeeper at age 10.

== University career ==
In 2009, he began attending the University of the Fraser Valley, where he played for the men's soccer team in 2011. In his first season in 2011, Village started seven matches and recorded one shutout on September 9 against Trinity Western. In 2012, he was named to the 2012 Canada West All-Star team. In 2012, he was named UFV MVP and helped them win a bronze medal in 2013. He holds several of UFV's Canada West-era goalkeeping records, including most wins (16), shutouts (11), minutes played (4,194), games played (46) and save percentage (.726).

== Club career ==
In 2012, he played with the Fraser Valley Mariners in the Premier Development League. That season, he started 15 games and led the league in saves with 103, and recorded a season high 11 saves in the final match of the season against the Vancouver Whitecaps FC U23.

In March 2015, after first going on trial, he signed a professional contract with USL club Whitecaps FC 2. In March 2017, he extended his contract with the club. Village made his professional debut for Whitecaps 2 on October 7, 2017, against the Real Monarchs, during which he made a 5th minute diving save to deny a goal attempt by Daniel Haber, which was later selected as the USL Fans' Choice Save of the Month for October 2017.

In November 2017, Village moved to fellow USL club FC Cincinnati for the 2018 season.

In January 2019, Village joined Pacific FC of the Canadian Premier League. He played in Pacific's first ever game on April 28, 2019 and kept a clean sheet in a 1–0 victory over HFX Wanderers FC, the first clean sheet in league history. On November 4, 2019 the club announced it would not be offering Village a contract for the following season. After becoming the club's goalkeeping coach in 2020, he occasionally served as the team's backup goalkeeper in emergency situations from 2020 to 2022.

== Coaching career ==
On February 28, 2020, Village announced his retirement from professional soccer, and that he would be remaining with Pacific as the club's goalkeeper coach under new manager Pa-Modou Kah. With Pacific, he won the 2021 CPL Championship. He departed the club after the 2022 season.

In December 2022, it was announced that he would join Vancouver FC, as their goalkeepers coach for the 2023 season.
