= Kadin Chung =

Canadian soccer player (born 1998)

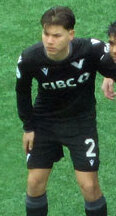

Personal information
- Full name: J. Kadin Brian Chung
- Date of birth: September 5, 1998 (age 28)
- Place of birth: New Westminster, British Columbia, Canada
- Height: 1.73 m (5 ft 8 in)
- Position: Full-back

Team information
- Current team: Pacific FC
- Number: 7

Youth career
- Coquitlam Metro-Ford SC
- 2011–2015: Vancouver Whitecaps FC

Senior career*
Years	Team	Apps	(Gls)
2015–2017	Whitecaps FC 2	45	(2)
2018	1. FC Kaiserslautern II	8	(0)
2019–2021	Pacific FC	57	(2)
2022–2023	Toronto FC	8	(0)
2022	→ Toronto FC II (loan)	7	(1)
2023–2024	Vancouver FC	32	(0)
2025–	Pacific FC	47	(2)

International career^{‡}
2014	Canada U16		
2015	Canada U17	6	(1)
2016–2017	Canada U20	8	(1)
2017	Canada U23	1	(0)
- * Club domestic league appearances and goals as of October 25, 2026 ‡ National team caps and goals as of March 29, 2017

J. Kadin Brian Chung (born September 5, 1998) is a Canadian professional soccer player who plays as a full-back for Pacific FC in the Canadian Premier League.

== Early life ==
Chung began playing youth soccer at age six with Coquitlam Metro-Ford SC. In his youth he also played hockey, swimming, and ran track and field. He played for the British Columbia provincial soccer team at U13 level. In September 2011, he joined the Vancouver Whitecaps Academy.

== Club career ==
In August 2015, he signed his first professional contract with Whitecaps FC 2 in the USL. On September 13, 2015, he made his professional debut against Orange County Blues FC. Ahead of the 2016 season, he was invited to training camp with the Vancouver Whitecaps first team. In May 2016, he was named to the USL Team of the Week, after recording his first professional assist in a 3–2 win over Tulsa Roughnecks FC. In 2018, rather than sign a USL deal with the Whitecaps new affiliate, Fresno FC, Chung would elect to pursue opportunities outside of Canada.

In February 2018, Chung joined German club 1. FC Kaiserslautern II. He made eight appearances in the fifth-tier Oberliga Rheinland-Pfalz/Saar.

In November 2018, Chung became the first ever player to sign with Pacific FC of the Canadian Premier League, ahead of their debut season in 2019. He scored his first goal on September 14, 2019, to give the team a 1–0 victory over FC Edmonton. In November 2020, he re-signed with the club for the 2021 season. On September 4, 2021, he scored a highlight reel goal in a 2–1 victory over FC Edmonton. In 2021, he won the CPL Championship with the club and was ranked #22 on the league's top 50 player for 2021 list. Over his three seasons with Pacific, he scored two goals in 63 appearances, across all competitions.

In January 2022, Chung went on trial with Major League Soccer club Toronto FC. In February, he officially signed a two-year contract with club options for 2024 and 2025 with the club. He became only the third player to move from the Canadian Premier League to Major League Soccer. He made his debut for the club on March 5, coming on as a substitute, against the New York Red Bulls. He made his first start in the next match on March 12 against the Columbus Crew. On March 19, he suffered a hamstring injury against D.C. United, which caused him to miss three weeks of action. He won the delayed 2020 Canadian Championship with the club in 2022. In June 2022, he was sent on loan to the second team, Toronto FC II, in MLS Next Pro, after his playing time with the first team stalled. On February 28, 2023, Chung and Toronto FC agreed to terminate his contract by mutual consent.

In March 2023, he signed with Vancouver FC in the Canadian Premier League. After playing as a right back throughout his career, he was shifted into a midfield role at the beginning of the 2023 season. He would make his debut on April 15 against his former club Pacific FC. In May, he suffered a broken collarbone during a match, keeping his out for the bulk of the 2023 season, eventually returning to action in late August.

In January 2025, he returned to his former club, Pacific FC, on a two-year contract.

== International career ==
Born in Canada, Chung is of Chinese and Filipino heritage on his father's side.

In June 2013, he made his debut in the Canadian youth program, attending a camp for the Canada U15 team. In April 2014, he was named to the Canada U16 squad for the Montaigu Tournament in France, as well as for the U16 Copa Mexico de Naciones.

Chung was named to the Canada U17 squad for the 2015 CONCACAF U-17 Championship. Prior to the tournament, he was named man of the match in a friendly against Guatemala U17. He scored in the team's first match of the tournament against Haiti U17 on February 28. He was named the 2015 Canadian U17 Player of the Year.

In November 2015, he was called up to the Canada U20 for a camp for the first time. In March 2016, he was called up to the U20 squad in their two games against England U20 and scored a goal to open the scoring in a 2–1 victory on March 27. In August 2016, he was called up to the U-20 team for a pair of friendlies against Costa Rica In February 2017, Chung was named to Canada's roster for the 2017 CONCACAF U-20 Championship

In March 2017, he played with the Canadian U23 at the 2017 Qatar U23 tournament. He was named to the provisional roster for the 2020 CONCACAF Men's Olympic Qualifying Championship in February 2020 and on the revised list in February 2021, following the postponement due to the COVID-19 pandemic.

== Career statistics ==
As of match played October 24, 2025

Appearances and goals by club, season and competition
Club	Season	League			Playoffs		National cup		Total	
Club	Season	Division	Apps	Goals	Apps	Goals	Apps	Goals	Apps	Goals
Whitecaps FC 2	2015	USL	2	0	—		—		2	0
Whitecaps FC 2	2016	USL	19	0	3	0	—		22	0
Whitecaps FC 2	2017	USL	24	2	—		—		24	2
Whitecaps FC 2	Total		45	2	3	0	0	0	48	2
1. FC Kaiserslautern II	2017–18	Oberliga Rheinland-Pfalz/Saar	8	0	—		—		8	0
Pacific FC	2019	Canadian Premier League	24	1	—		1	0	25	1
Pacific FC	2020	Canadian Premier League	9	0	—		—		9	0
Pacific FC	2021	Canadian Premier League	24	1	2	0	3	0	29	1
Pacific FC	Total		57	2	2	0	4	0	63	2
Toronto FC	2022	Major League Soccer	8	0	—		1 (Note: Includes appearance in 2020 Canadian Championship final (played in 2022))	0	9	0
Toronto FC II (loan)	2022	MLS Next Pro	7	1	2	0	—		9	1
Vancouver FC	2023	Canadian Premier League	13	0	—		1	0	14	0
Vancouver FC	2024	Canadian Premier League	19	0	—		1	0	20	0
Vancouver FC	Total		32	0	0	0	2	0	34	0
Pacific FC	2025	Canadian Premier League	27	1	—		1	0	28	1
Career total			184	6	7	0	8	0	199	6

== Honours ==
Pacific FC

- Canadian Premier League: 2021

Toronto FC

- Canadian Championship: 2020
