= Pa-Modou Kah =

Norwegian football coach (born 1980)

Pa Modou Kah
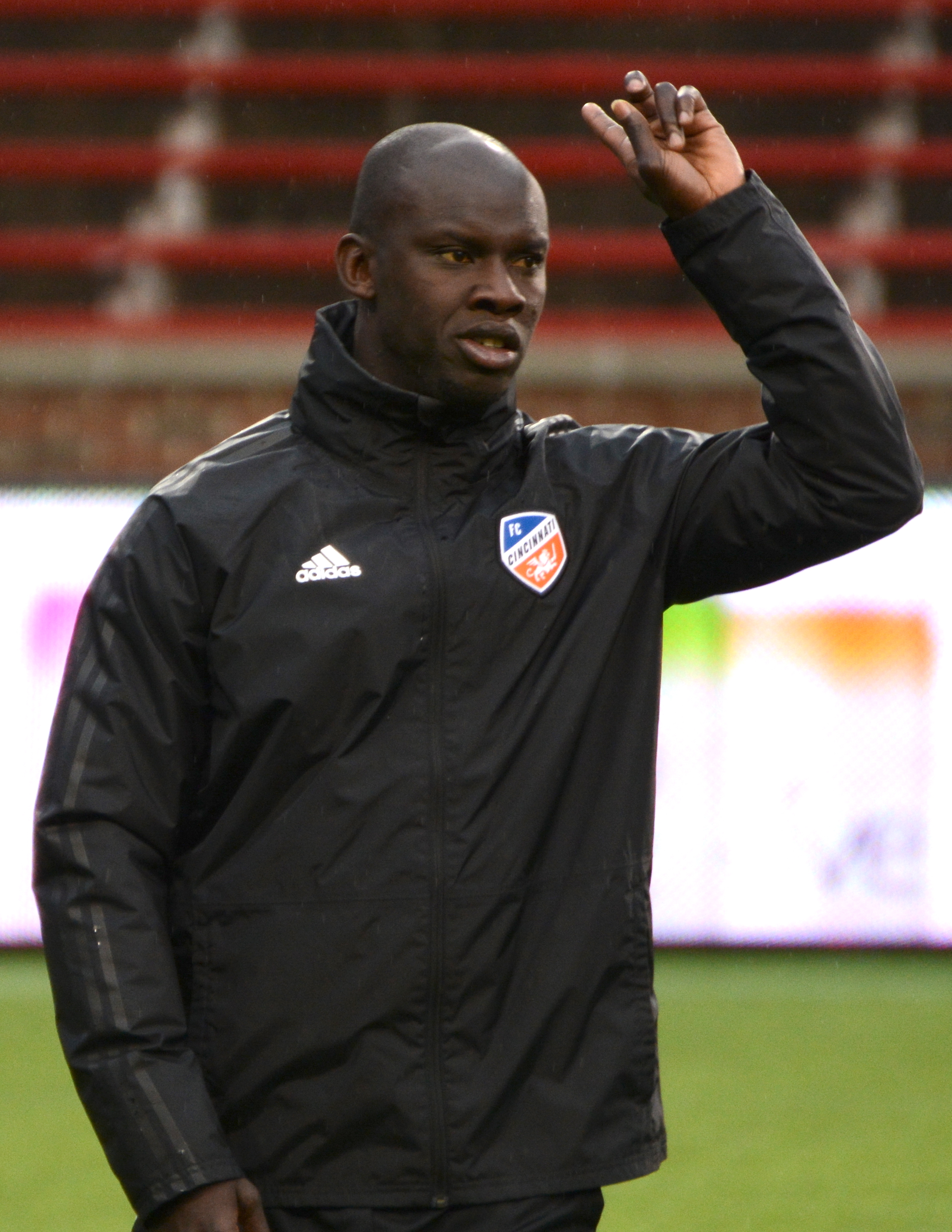
- Kah with FC Cincinnati in 2019

Personal information
- Date of birth: 30 July 1980 (age 46)
- Place of birth: Banjul, The Gambia
- Height: 1.85 m (6 ft 1 in)
- Position: Defender

Team information
- Current team: Phoenix Rising (head coach)

Senior career*
Years	Team	Apps	(Gls)
1998–2003	Vålerenga	94	(9)
2003–2004	AIK	29	(3)
2004–2011	Roda JC	189	(12)
2011–2013	Al Khor	12	(1)
2012	→ Qatar SC (loan)	7	(0)
2013	Al-Wehda	10	(0)
2013–2014	Portland Timbers	40	(1)
2015–2016	Vancouver Whitecaps FC	30	(3)
2016	Whitecaps FC 2	3	(0)
Total		414	(29)

International career
2001–2008	Norway	10	(1)

Managerial career
- 2016–2017: Whitecaps FC 2 (assistant)
- 2019: FC Cincinnati (assistant)
- 2020–2021: Pacific FC
- 2022: North Texas SC
- 2023–2024: Charlotte FC (assistant)
- 2024–: Phoenix Rising
- * Club domestic league appearances and goals

Pa Modou Kah (Norwegian pronunciation: [pɑː moʊduː kɑː]; born 30 July 1980) is a football coach and former player who is the head coach for Phoenix Rising FC in the USL Championship. Born in the Gambia, he represented the Norway national team. During his playing career, Kah played as a defender for clubs in Norway, Sweden, the Netherlands, Qatar, Saudi Arabia, the United States, and Canada.

== Early life ==
Kah was born in Banjul, a city of roughly 30,000 people situated where the Gambia River meets the Atlantic Ocean. He has described his childhood there as largely unsupervised, recalling that he and other neighbourhood children would take fruit from nearby trees and slip away to the beach without permission before returning home after school to play games in the street, including relay races and gymnastics. Kah is the son of two former Gambian national team athletes, footballer Ebrima Kah and basketball player Amie Njie-Kah, and has said his grandfather's advice to "never look back" and "always look forward" was a significant influence on him growing up.

Kah and his family emigrated to Norway in 1988, when he was eight years old. He has said the family arrived in Oslo in February with few resources, no existing community connections, and no familiarity with the Norwegian language, and that he had never seen snow before that point; he has described the adjustment as difficult, but said organized sport, and football in particular, became an important outlet during that period. He has said he first trained with Vålerenga's first team at age sixteen before making his professional debut with the club two years later.

== Playing career ==
=== Vålerenga ===
He began his football career with Vålerenga in 1998. At Vålerenga, he appeared in 94 league matches and scored 9 goals. In the 2001 season, his side won promotion and won the Norwegian Cup the year after.

=== AIK ===
In mid-2003, Kah moved to Swedish club AIK. Kah was appreciated for his fighting spirit and ability to win the ball. Although his natural position was as a central midfielder, he had to play in various positions; he played several games at right-back. After the club was relegated the following season, Kah transferred to Dutch club Roda JC.

=== Roda JC ===
Kah made nearly 200 league appearances for Roda JC, mainly playing as a central defender. Kah has said his time in the Netherlands, where he played alongside opponents including Zlatan Ibrahimović and Luis Suárez, gave him a deeper technical and tactical understanding of the game, particularly regarding spacing and how Dutch sides opened up play.

=== Al-Khor ===
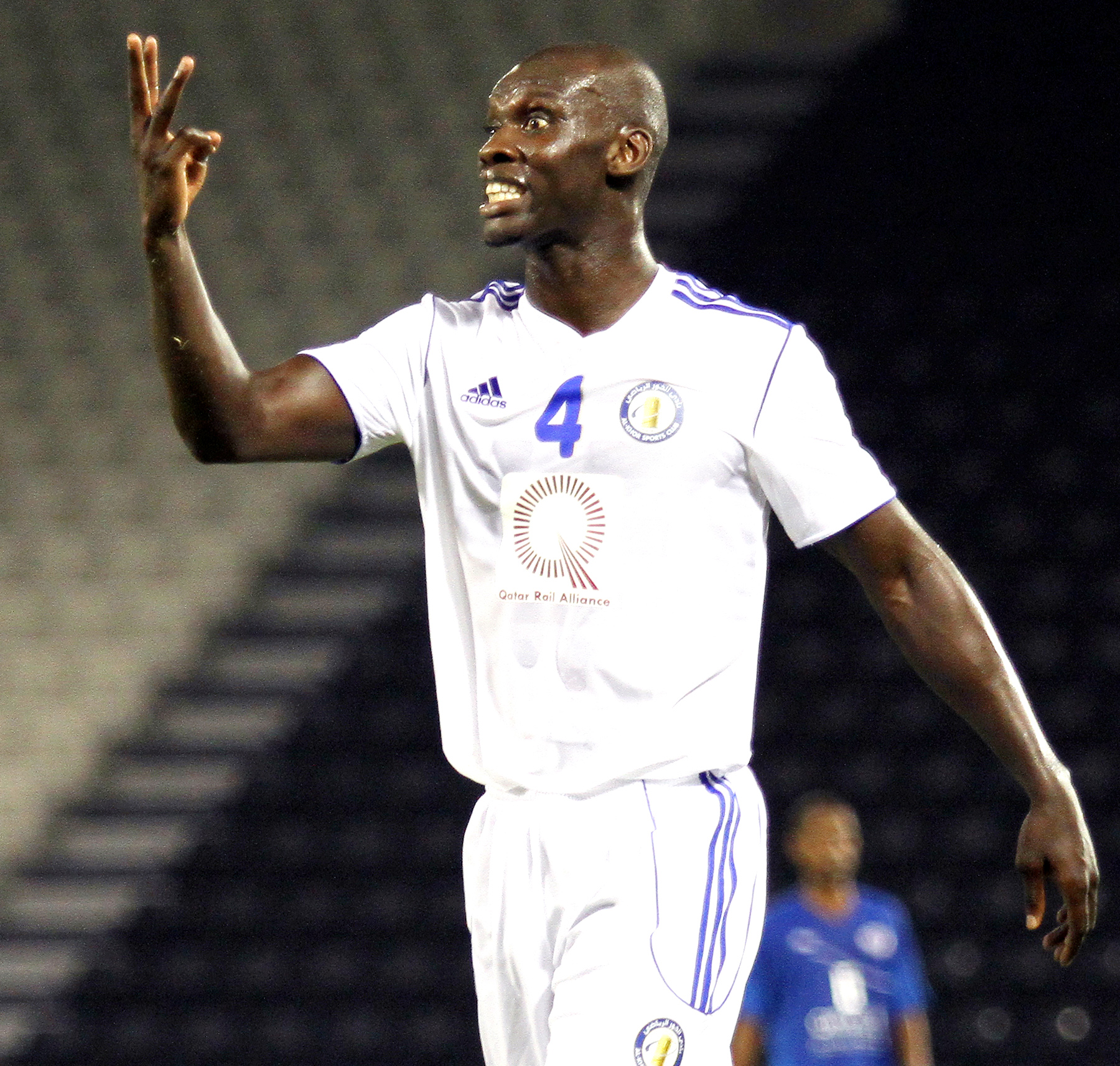
Kah playing for Al Khor in 2011

In 2011, after seven years in the Netherlands, Kah moved to Qatari club Al Khor.

=== Portland Timbers ===
After a brief period in Saudi Arabia with Al-Wehda, Kah moved to the United States on 3 May 2013 when he signed with Major League Soccer club Portland Timbers. On 8 December 2014, the Portland Timbers declined contract options on Kah. While playing for Portland, Kah has said he was involved in a heated on-field altercation with Vancouver Whitecaps FC manager Carl Robinson during a 2013 Cascadia Cup fixture, after which he called a Whitecaps assistant coach to apologise; Kah has said Robinson was reportedly not offended by the incident.

=== Vancouver Whitecaps FC ===
Kah was unsigned in the waivers draft and later claimed by Vancouver Whitecaps FC on 21 January 2015. Kah has said Robinson later signed him to Vancouver in 2015 in part because of the impression left by that earlier confrontation.

In August 2016, he agreed to mutually terminate his contract with Vancouver Whitecaps' first team in favour of joining their USL team as a player-coach. Kah has said Robinson's decision to give him that role, at age 35 and near the end of his playing career, gave him "a new, different life," for which he has said he remains grateful. It was during his time coaching Whitecaps FC 2 that Kah has said he first mentored a 15-year-old Alphonso Davies, with whom he has said he remains close, and worked with several players, including Terran Campbell, Kadin Chung, Matthew Baldisimo and Marco Bustos, who would later join him at Pacific FC. On 21 February 2017, Kah announced his retirement and it was also confirmed, that he would continue working at the club as a Whitecaps FC staff coach.

== Coaching career ==
FC Cincinnati added Kah to its technical staff as a member of the scouting staff in August 2018. In January 2019, the club announced that Kah's role would be changing, and he would now serve as an assistant coach.

On 14 January 2020, Kah signed with Canadian Premier League side Pacific FC as the club's new head coach, becoming the first CPL club to change managers following a disappointing debut season. During the 2020 CPL season, Kah guided Pacific to their first play-off appearance, when they reached the second group stage of the Island Games before being eliminated. During the 2021 season, Kah guided Pacific to the 2021 Canadian Championship semi-finals, defeating Vancouver Whitecaps FC and Cavalry FC before falling to Toronto FC. In the 2021 Canadian Premier League Final, Pacific defeated Forge FC 1–0 at Tim Hortons Field. For his efforts, Kah was named the 2021 CPL Coach of the Year. Reflecting on his approach to squad culture at Pacific, Kah has said he emphasised discipline and standards away from matches, including having players clean up after team meals, and has said he personally cooked for the squad on occasion. Former Pacific FC captain Jamar Dixon and Josh Heard have both described Kah as an intense but fair presence within the squad, saying he treated all players equally regardless of status and placed strong emphasis on the group functioning as a family off the pitch. Pacific FC co-owner Rob Friend has compared Kah's leadership style and personality to prominent managers such as Jürgen Klopp and Pep Guardiola, saying a club needs a coach who can serve as its public face, and has credited Kah with lifting belief throughout the organization.

On 21 January 2022, Kah was announced as the new head coach of North Texas SC.

In January 2023, he joined Major League Soccer club Charlotte FC as an assistant coach.

Kah was named head coach for USL Championship club Phoenix Rising FC on 18 November 2024.

== Personal life ==
In 2005, Kah was involved in a car accident in Peer, Belgium. He was accompanied by his girlfriend, his cousin, and a friend. His car was rear-ended while stopped at a routine road check, immediately killing his girlfriend but only inflicting minor injuries to Kah. In Roda JC's next match, referee Bjorn Kuipers held a minute of silence to in honour of Kah's girlfriend. During the game, Arouna Koné took his shirt off to reveal an undershirt which bore the inscription "For Kah". The referee showed Koné a yellow card, a decision the commentators criticised. Kuipers said afterwards that he had not seen the text on Koné's shirt.

Kah speaks seven languages, including English, Norwegian, and some Spanish.

Kah possesses a US green card which qualifies him as a domestic player for MLS roster purposes.

Kah is the nephew of Djimon Hounsou.

Kah has trained with Manchester United, including in 2002 under manager Sir Alex Ferguson, though injuries prevented a permanent signing with the club. He holds an engineering degree. Kah has spoken about being one of relatively few Black head coaches in men's professional football, saying he considers it part of his role to demonstrate what is possible for minority coaches, and has said he believes such individuals are frequently denied the same opportunities as their peers. He has said he has expressed interest in one day coaching the Gambia national football team, and has described his broader coaching philosophy as centred on building safe, welcoming environments and creating a lasting legacy within the communities he works in.

== Career statistics ==
=== International ===
Appearances and goals by national team and year
National team	Year	Apps	Goals
Norway	2001	1	0
Norway	2002	1	1
Norway	2003	3	0
Norway	2004	3	0
Norway	2005	–	
Norway	2006	1	0
Norway	2007	–	
Norway	2008	1	0
Total		10	1

Scores and results list Austria's goal tally first, score column indicates score after each Kah goal.

List of international goals scored by Pa-Modou Kah
No.	Date	Venue	Opponent	Score	Result	Competition
1	20 November 2002	Gerhard Hanappi Stadium, Vienna, Austria	Austria	1–0	1–0	Friendly

== Managerial statistics ==
As of matches played 30 September 2022

Managerial record by team and tenure
Team	From	To	Record								Ref
Team	From	To	G	W	D	L	GF	GA	GD	Win %	Ref
Pacific FC	14 January 2020	21 January 2022	43	21	8	14	72	53	+19	48.84	
North Texas SC (Note: MLS Next Pro teams played shootouts to earn an extra point after ties. Of the five ties in 2022, North Texas SC had two Shootout wins and three Shootout losses for a total record of 13-2-3-7)	21 January 2022	30 September 2022	25	13	5	7	48	33	+15	52.00	
Career totals			68	34	13	21	120	86	+34	50.00	

== Honours ==
=== Manager ===
Pacific FC

- Canadian Premier League: 2021
