= Zach Verhoven =

Canadian soccer player (born 1998)

Personal information
- Full name: Zachary Thomas Verhoven
- Date of birth: August 17, 1998 (age 28)
- Place of birth: Burnaby, British Columbia, Canada
- Height: 1.73 m (5 ft 8 in)
- Position: Midfielder

Youth career
- 2003–2009: Surrey United SC
- 2010–2011: Surrey Guildford United SC
- 2011–2013: Vancouver Whitecaps FC
- 2013–2016: Surrey United SC

College career
Years	Team	Apps	(Gls)
2016–2018	UBC Thunderbirds	64	(12)

Senior career*
Years	Team	Apps	(Gls)
2017–2018	TSS FC Rovers	21	(5)
2019–2020	Pacific FC	31	(3)
2021–2023	Atlético Ottawa	59	(7)
2024	Vancouver FC	4	(0)
2025	New Lambton FC	12	(1)
2025	Vancouver FC	2	(0)
- * Club domestic league appearances and goals as of October 22, 2025

Zachary Thomas Verhoven (born August 17, 1998) is a Canadian soccer player who plays as a midfielder.

== Early life ==
Verhoven played youth soccer with Surrey United SC from 2003 to 2009. In 2010, he joined Surrey Guildford United SC. He also played on the British Columbia provincial team. After being part of the Whitecaps Propects program from 2008 to 2010, he officially joined the Vancouver Whitecaps Academy in September 2011. After the Whitecaps released him at the U15 level, he returned to Surrey United where he played until he reached the U18 level.

== University career ==
In 2016, Verhoven began attending the University of British Columbia, where he played for the men's soccer team. He scored his first goal on September 4, 2016 against the UNBC Timberwolves, while also recording two assists in a 3-1 victory. On November 2, 2018, Verhoven scored two goals and added an assist in a 7-0 victory over the UFV Cascades. With UBC, he won three consecutive Canada West Conference titles from 2016 to 2018.

== Club career ==
In 2017 and 2018, he played with the TSS Rovers in the Premier Development League.

In November 2018, Verhoven was selected in the second round (ninth overall) of the 2018 CPL–U Sports Draft by Pacific FC of the Canadian Premier League. In April 2019, he signed a professional contract with the club. He scored his first professional goal on August 18, 2019, with a shot from just over the midfield line against York 9 FC. In his first season as a professional, he scored two goals and added three assists. After primarily playing a "super-sub" role during his two years with Pacific, he departed the club after the 2020 season, after he requested his release.

In April 2021, Verhoven signed with Atlético Ottawa. During the 2021 season, he was often deployed in a more defensive right back position, transitioning from his usually midfield position, filling in due to injuries to other players. He was nominated for the Capital City Supporters Group Player of the Season in his inaugural season with the club. In January 2022, he re-signed with the club for two more season, with an option for 2024. In June 2022, he scored game-winning goals in back-to-back matches on June 1 against Valour FC and June 5 against his former club Pacific FC. During his second season with the club, he suffered a couple of injuries which limited him to only 12 regular season appearances, but he did return in time for the playoffs, scoring his first playoff goal in the first leg of the semi-finals against Pacific FC, as Ottawa advanced to the championship final. He departed the club after the 2023 season.

In March 2024, he signed with Vancouver FC on a one-year contract with an option for 2025.

In 2025, he joined Australian club New Lambton FC in the NPL Northern NSW.

In September 2025, he returned to Vancouver FC, signing for the remainder of the 2025 season.

== International career ==
In September 2021, it was reported that Fiji were interested in having Verhoven join the program ahead of their FIFA World Cup qualification campaign.

== Career statistics ==
As of October 19, 2025

Club	Season	League			Playoffs		Domestic Cup		Continental		Total	
Club	Season	Division	Apps	Goals	Apps	Goals	Apps	Goals	Apps	Goals	Apps	Goals
TSS FC Rovers	2017	Premier Development League	11	2	—		—		—		11	2
TSS FC Rovers	2018	Premier Development League	10	3	—		—		—		9	1
TSS FC Rovers	Total		21	5	0	0	0	0	0	0	21	5
Pacific FC	2019	Canadian Premier League	22	2	—		2	0	—		24	2
Pacific FC	2020	Canadian Premier League	9	1	—		—		—		9	1
Pacific FC	Total		31	3	0	0	2	0	0	0	33	3
Atlético Ottawa	2021	Canadian Premier League	25	1	—		1	0	—		26	1
Atlético Ottawa	2022	Canadian Premier League	12	2	3	1	1	0	—		16	3
Atlético Ottawa	2023	Canadian Premier League	22	3	—		1	0	—		23	3
Atlético Ottawa	Total		59	7	3	1	3	0	0	0	65	8
Vancouver FC	2024	Canadian Premier League	4	0	—		0	0	—		4	0
New Lambton FC	2025	NPL Northern NSW	12	1	—		—		—		12	1
Vancouver FC	2025	Canadian Premier League	2	0	—		0	0	—		2	0
Career total			129	16	3	1	5	0	0	0	137	16
