= Terran Campbell =

Canadian soccer player (born 1998)

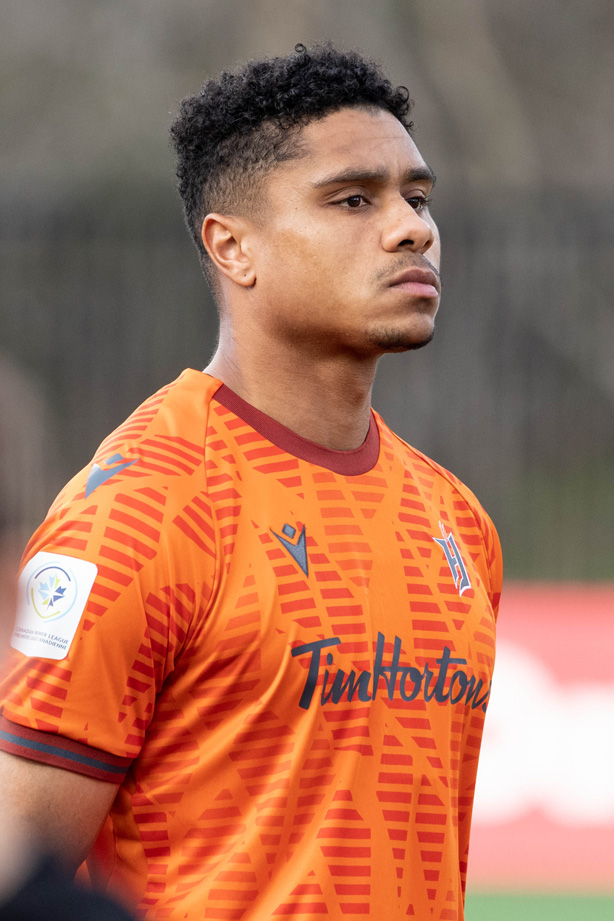
- Campbell with Forge FC in 2022

Personal information
- Date of birth: October 10, 1998 (age 28)
- Place of birth: Burnaby, British Columbia, Canada
- Height: 1.83 m (6 ft 0 in)
- Position: Forward

Team information
- Current team: Vancouver FC
- Number: 14

Youth career
- South Burnaby Metro Club
- 2010–2011: Burnaby Selects SC
- 2011–2016: Vancouver Whitecaps FC

Senior career*
Years	Team	Apps	(Gls)
2015–2017	Whitecaps FC 2	34	(3)
2018	Fresno FC	5	(0)
2019–2021	Pacific FC	64	(22)
2022–2024	Forge FC	62	(16)
2025–	Vancouver FC	50	(10)

International career^{‡}
2013	Canada U15		
2015	Canada U17	5	(0)
- * Club domestic league appearances and goals as of October 27, 2026 ‡ National team caps and goals as of October 13, 2015

Terran Campbell (born October 10, 1998) is a Canadian professional soccer player who plays for Canadian Premier League club Vancouver FC.

== Early life ==
Campbell began playing soccer at age five with South Burnaby Metro Club. In 2010, he joined the Burnaby Selects SC and was also part of the British Columbia provincial U13 team. In September 2011, he joined the Vancouver Whitecaps FC Academy. After signing a professional contract with the Whitecaps second team, he continued to play with the Academy teams in 2016.

== Club career ==
On July 31, 2015, he debuted with Whitecaps FC 2 in the USL, as an academy call-up, against the Tulsa Roughnecks. In August 2015, at age 16, he signed a professional contract with Whitecaps FC 2 in the USL. He scored his first professional goal on May 28, 2017, against the Real Monarchs.

In December 2017, Campbell joined Fresno FC in the USL for the 2018 season, who became the Whitecaps' new USL affiliate after they decided to disband the Whitecaps FC 2 team. He scored his first goal in a US Open Cup match on May 16 against Orange County FC.

In January 2019, Campbell joined Pacific FC for the inaugural season of the Canadian Premier League. He scored his first goal for the club on June 1, 2019, against HFX Wanderers FC. He became the first player to score double-digit goals in the league. At the end of the season, he was nominated for the league's Young Player of the Year award, and finished the season second in the Golden Boot race, with 11 goals, trailing only Tristan Borges. He subsequently re-signed with the club for the 2020 season. In 2021, he won the league championship with Pacific and he was nominated for the CPL Player of the Year award. After the 2021 season, he departed the club. At the time of his departure from Pacific, he was the club's all-time leading scorer with 25 goals, while also adding 10 assists (tied for first in club's history), in 69 appearances, across all competitions.

On January 7, 2022, Pacific FC announced that Campbell had left the club to sign with fellow Canadian Premier League side Forge FC ahead of the 2022 season. Forge officially confirmed the signing to a multi-year contract the following week. He made his debut for his new club in their 2022 CONCACAF Champions League first-leg match against Cruz Azul on February 16. He scored a brace on April 23 against FC Edmonton, for his first goals with the club. On July 9, 2023, Campbell scored his first career hat-trick against York United in an eventual 4-0 victory. At the end of the 2023 season, he was one of ten nominees for CPL Players’ Player of the Year award. In October 2023, he helped Forge win their fourth league title, following a 2–1 win over Cavalry FC in the play-off final. At the end of the 2023 season, he was named to the CPL Best XI.

In February 2025, Campbell signed with Vancouver FC. On April 13, 2025, Campbell scored his 40th Canadian Premier League goal, becoming the first player in the league to reach that mark.

== International career ==
In 2013, he made his debut in the Canadian program being called to a camp with the Canada U15 team. He was also named to Canada's men's U15 roster for the 2013 Copa Mexico de Naciones, where he made his national team debut.

Campbell received his first Canada U17 call-up in April 2014 and would participate in a total of six U17 preparation camps under Sean Fleming, before being named to Canada's squad for the 2015 CONCACAF U-17 Championship.

In February 2020, Campbell was named to the Canadian U23 provisional roster for the 2020 CONCACAF Men's Olympic Qualifying Championship.

== Career statistics ==
As of October 22, 2025

Club	League				Playoffs		National Cup		Continental		Total	
Club	Division	Season	Apps	Goals	Apps	Goals	Apps	Goals	Apps	Goals	Apps	Goals
Whitecaps FC 2	USL	2015	1	0	—		—		—		1	0
Whitecaps FC 2	USL	2016	8	0	0	0	—		—		8	0
Whitecaps FC 2	USL	2017	25	3	—		—		—		25	3
Fresno FC	USL	2018	5	0	—		2	1	—		7	1
Fresno FC	Total		39	3	0	0	2	1	0	0	41	4
Pacific FC	Canadian Premier League	2019	28	11	—		1	0	—		29	11
Pacific FC	Canadian Premier League	2020	10	1	—		—		—		10	1
Pacific FC	Canadian Premier League	2021	26	10	2	1	2	2	—		30	13
Pacific FC	Total		64	22	2	1	3	2	0	0	69	25
Forge FC	Canadian Premier League	2022	27	6	2	0	3 (Note: Includes appearance in the 2020 Canadian Championship final (played in 2022))	1	2	0	34	7
Forge FC	Canadian Premier League	2023	28	10	2	0	3	0	—		33	10
Forge FC	Canadian Premier League	2024	7	0	1	0	1	0	2	1	11	1
Forge FC	Total		62	16	5	0	7	1	4	1	78	18
Vancouver FC	Canadian Premier League	2025	23	3	—		6	0	—		29	3
Career totals			188	44	7	1	18	4	4	1	217	50

== Honours ==
Pacific FC

- Canadian Premier League: 2021

Forge FC

- Canadian Premier League: 2022, 2023
