= Émile Legault =

Canadian soccer player (born 2000)

Personal information
- Date of birth: April 10, 2000 (age 26)
- Place of birth: Longueuil, Québec, Canada
- Height: 1.80 m (5 ft 11 in)
- Position: Defender

Youth career
- 2004–2012: Saint-Lambert
- 2012–2018: Auxerre

College career
Years	Team	Apps	(Gls)
- Montreal Carabins

Senior career*
Years	Team	Apps	(Gls)
2019	Pacific FC	13	(0)
2020	Rio Grande Valley FC	4	(0)
2021	CS Mont-Royal Outremont	8	(0)
2023–	CS Mont-Royal Outremont	44	(1)

International career^{‡}
2016–2017	Canada U17	3	(0)
2018	Canada U20	4	(0)
2018	Canada U21	2	(0)
- * Club domestic league appearances and goals as of September 8, 2025 ‡ National team caps and goals as of May 1, 2019

Émile Legault (born April 10, 2000) is a Canadian soccer player who plays as a defender who plays for CS Mont-Royal Outremont in Ligue1 Québec.

== Early life ==
Legault was born in Longueuil, Quebec, and grew up in nearby Saint-Lambert. He began playing soccer at age four with local club AS Saint-Lambert.

== Club career ==
=== Auxerre ===
Legault moved to France with his mother at age twelve, where he was recruited by the academy of Ligue 2 side AJ Auxerre. Initially a forward, Legault converted first to a central midfielder and then to a full-back while at Auxerre. In 2016, he joined the club's U-17 squad.

=== Pacific FC ===
On April 25, 2019, Legault signed with Canadian Premier League side Pacific FC. He made his professional debut for the club on May 1 against Valour FC and would make a total of thirteen league appearances that season. On November 4, 2019, the club announced it would not be exercising Legault's contract option for next season.

=== Rio Grande Valley FC ===
On March 7, 2020, Legault joined USL Championship side Rio Grande Valley FC. He made four appearances that season.

=== Mont-Royal Outremont ===
In July 2021, Legault returned to Canada, signing with PLSQ side Mont-Royal Outremont.

== International career ==
Legault has represented Canada at multiple youth levels. In May 2018, he was called up to the Canadian U-21 squad for the 2018 Toulon Tournament. Legault was also named to the Canadian U-20 squad for the 2018 CONCACAF U-20 Championship on October 24, 2018. Legault was named to the Canadian U-23 provisional roster for the 2020 CONCACAF Men's Olympic Qualifying Championship on February 26, 2020.

== Personal life ==
Legault holds Canadian and French nationalities.

== Career statistics ==
As of 30 September 2024

Club statistics
Club	Season	League			Playoffs		Domestic Cup		League Cup		Total	
Club	Season	Division	Apps	Goals	Apps	Goals	Apps	Goals	Apps	Goals	Apps	Goals
Pacific FC	2019	Canadian Premier League	13	0	—		1	0	—		14	0
Rio Grande Valley FC	2020	USL Championship	4	0	—		—		—		4	0
CS Mont-Royal Outremont	2021	PLSQ	6	0	—		—		—		6	0
CS Mont-Royal Outremont	2023	Ligue1 Québec	15	1	—		—		—		15	1
CS Mont-Royal Outremont	2024	Ligue1 Québec	14	0	—		—		0	0	14	0
CS Mont-Royal Outremont	2025	Ligue1 Québec	15	0	—		—		0	0	15	0
CS Mont-Royal Outremont	Total	Ligue1 Québec	50	1	0	0	0	0	0	0	50	1
Career total			67	1	0	0	1	0	0	0	68	1
