= Ryan McCurdy =

Northern Irish footballer (born 1991)

Personal information
- Full name: Ryan McCurdy
- Date of birth: 23 May 1991 (age 35)
- Place of birth: Belfast, Northern Ireland
- Position: Centre-back

Youth career
- Linfield

College career
Years	Team	Apps	(Gls)
- Algonquin Thunder
2017–2018	VIU Mariners		

Senior career*
Years	Team	Apps	(Gls)
2012–2014	Kingston FC		
2015–2016	Kingston Clippers	8	(0)
2017	Victoria Highlanders	14	(0)
2018–2019	CCB LFC United		
2019	Pacific FC	10	(0)

Managerial career
- 2023–: Van Isle Wave (Technical Lead)
- * Club domestic league appearances and goals

Ryan McCurdy (born 23 May 1991) is a former professional footballer who played as a centre-back. He is the technical director for the Van Isle Wave Program.

== Club career ==
=== Kingston FC ===
In 2012, McCurdy signed with Kingston FC in the Canadian Soccer League, and in 2013 featured in the CSL Championship final.

=== Kingston Clippers ===
In 2015 and 2016, McCurdy played for League1 Ontario side Kingston Clippers. In 2016, he made eight appearances for Kingston in league play.

=== Victoria Highlanders ===
In 2017, McCurdy captained PDL side Victoria Highlanders, making fourteen appearances.

=== Pacific FC ===
On 17 April 2019, McCurdy signed with Canadian Premier League side Pacific FC. On 29 April 2019, McCurdy made his professional debut for Pacific as a substitute in a 1–0 win over HFX Wanderers. He made a total of ten league appearances for Pacific that season. On 4 November 2019, the club announced it would not be offering McCurdy a new contract for the following season. After the conclusion of the season he retired from professional soccer.
