= José Hernández (soccer, born 2000) =

Canadian soccer player

Personal information
- Date of birth: March 19, 2000 (age 26)
- Place of birth: Edmonton, Alberta, Canada
- Height: 1.64 m (5 ft 5 in)
- Position: Forward

Team information
- Current team: Edmonton Scottish

Youth career
- Edmonton Internazionale
- Edmonton Juventus
- –2016: FC Edmonton
- 2016–2018: Vancouver Whitecaps FC

Senior career*
Years	Team	Apps	(Gls)
2019	Pacific FC	19	(1)
2020–2021	Cavalry FC	20	(0)
2022	Rivers FC		
2025–	Edmonton Scottish	0	(0)

International career^{‡}
2016–2017	Canada U17	3	(0)
2018	Canada U20	3	(1)
- * Club domestic league appearances and goals as of April 29, 2025 ‡ National team caps and goals as of 29 April 2019

José Hernández (born March 19, 2000) is a Canadian professional soccer player who plays for Edmonton Scottish in League1 Alberta.

== Early life ==
The son of a Mexican father and El Salvadorean mother, Hernández started his career at the age of five with Edmonton Internazionale. He later joined the academy programme of FC Edmonton before switching to the academy of Vancouver Whitecaps FC in August 2016. In the 2016–17 season, he played for Vancouver's U16 team in the USSDA and scored 19 goals in 26 appearances. The following year he moved up to the U18 team, where he made 15 appearances and scored 13 goals.

== Club career ==
On 7 February 2019, Hernández signed his first professional contract with Canadian Premier League side Pacific FC. He made his debut as a substitute on 28 April 2019 in the club's inaugural match. He scored his first goal for the club, which was also his first professional goal, in their next game against Valour FC on May 1. It would be his only goal for Pacific. After the conclusion of the 2019 season, Hernández did not resign with Pacific.

On 11 December 2019, Hernández signed for Cavalry FC, becoming the first player to ever switch from one Canadian Premier League side to another. In November 2020, Hernández would re-sign with the club for the 2021 season. After the 2021 season, Cavalry announced that Hernandez would leave the club after two seasons.

In April 2022, he joined League1 British Columbia club Rivers FC.

== International career ==
Hernández received his first Canada U17 call-up in October 2016 for an evaluation camp in Vaughan. He was called up to two further camps, including a pair of friendlies against Jamaica U17, where he made his international debut on November 27, 2016. and was then named to the roster for the 2017 CONCACAF U-17 Championship, where he made one appearance in a match against Cuba.

In November 2018, Hernández was called up by the Canada U20 team for the 2018 CONCACAF U-20 Championship, where he made three appearances and scored a goal in the opening match against Dominica. In February 2021, it was rumoured that the El Salvador national football team started talks with Hernández to play for the homeland of his mother.

== Personal life ==
Born in Canada, is of Mexican and Salvadorean descent. His father played for Unam in Mexico, his brother Christian played for MacEwan Griffins men soccer team and his other siblings, played amateur soccer in Alberta.
