= List of Canadian Premier League transfers 2023 =

This is a list of transfers for the 2023 Canadian Premier League season.

This list includes all transfers involving Canadian Premier League clubs after their last match of the 2022 Canadian Premier League season and before their last match of the 2023 season.

== Transfers ==
Clubs without flags are Canadian.

Date	Name	Moving from	Moving to	Fee
28 October 2022	(Trinidad and Tobago) Akeem Garcia	HFX Wanderers FC	Retired	Contract expired
2 November 2022	(Canada) Matteo Polisi	Pacific FC	BB5 United	Contract expired
2 November 2022	(Guinea-Bissau) Umaro Baldé	Pacific FC		Contract expired
8 November 2022	(England) Nathan Mavila	Pacific FC		Contract expired
8 November 2022	(Canada) Luca Ricci	Pacific FC		Contract expired
8 November 2022	(Canada) Joseph Di Chiara	Cavalry FC		Contract expired
8 November 2022	(Republic of Ireland) Tom Field	Cavalry FC		Contract expired
8 November 2022	(Canada) Karifa Yao	Cavalry FC	CF Montréal	Loan expired
8 November 2022	(Canada) Jamar Dixon	Pacific FC	Retired	Contract expired
8 November 2022	(Canada) Jean-Aniel Assi	Cavalry FC	CF Montréal	Loan expired
15 November 2022	(Canada) Brett Levis	Valour FC	(United States) FC Tulsa	Free
15 November 2022	(Canada) Easton Ongaro	Whitecaps FC 2	Pacific FC	Free
28 November 2022	(Canada) Pierre Lamothe	HFX Wanderers FC	Pacific FC	Free
30 November 2022	(Spain) Iván Pérez	Atlético Ottawa	(Spain) Mar Menor FC	Free
30 November 2022	(Canada) Chris Mannella	Atlético Ottawa		Contract expired
30 November 2022	(Canada) Keven Alemán	Atlético Ottawa		Contract expired
30 November 2022	(Canada) Ben McKendry	Atlético Ottawa		Contract expired
30 November 2022	(Canada) Gabriel Carvalho	Atlético Ottawa		Development contract expired
30 November 2022	(Canada) Omar Darwish	Atlético Ottawa	Ottawa South United	Development contract expired
30 November 2022	(Canada) Anthony Domanico	Atlético Ottawa		Development contract expired
1 December 2022	(Canada) Elijah Adekugbe	Cavalry FC	York United	Free
3 December 2022	(Canada) Drew Beckie	Atlético Ottawa	Retired	Contract expired
5 December 2022	(Canada) Jordan Haynes	Pacific FC	Valour FC	Free
6 December 2022	(Canada) Christian Oxner	HFX Wanderers FC		Contract expired
6 December 2022	(Germany) Peter Schaale	HFX Wanderers FC		Contract expired
6 December 2022	(Canada) Obeng Tabi	HFX Wanderers FC		Contract expired
6 December 2022	(Brazil) Eriks Santos	HFX Wanderers FC		Contract expired
6 December 2022	(Jamaica) Alex Marshall	HFX Wanderers FC		Contract expired
6 December 2022	(Senegal) Mour Samb	HFX Wanderers FC		Contract expired
6 December 2022	(Canada) Colin Gander	HFX Wanderers FC	Guelph United	Contract expired
6 December 2022	(England) Cory Bent	HFX Wanderers FC		Contract expired
9 December 2022	(Canada) Jérémy Gagnon-Laparé	HFX Wanderers FC	York United	Free
9 December 2022	(Netherlands) Lassana Faye	(Ukraine) FC Rukh Lviv	York United	Free
12 December 2022	(Mali) Abdou Samake	Pacific FC	Valour FC	Free
13 December 2022	(Mexico) Vladimir Moragrega	Atlético Ottawa	(Mexico) Atlético San Luis	Loan expired
14 December 2022	(Canada) Callum Irving	Pacific FC	Vancouver FC	Free
14 December 2022	(Canada) Tiago Coimbra	(Brazil) Palmeiras	HFX Wanderers FC	Free
14 December 2022	(Canada) Markiyan Voytsekhovskyy	ProStars FC	York United	Free
14 December 2022	(Canada) Dominick Zator	York United	(Poland) Korona Kielce	Free
14 December 2022	(Australia) Jesse Daley	(Australia) Brisbane Roar	Cavalry FC	Free
15 December 2022	(Philippines) Matthew Baldisimo	Pacific FC	York United	Free
19 December 2022	(Canada) Isaiah Johnston	York United	(United States) Huntsville City FC	Undisclosed
19 December 2022	(Burundi) Pacifique Niyongabire	(Australia) Perth Glory	Valour FC	Free
20 December 2022	(Argentina) Mateo Hernández	York United	(Bolivia) C.D. Real Tomayapo	Undisclosed
21 December 2022	(Canada) Steffen Yeates	Toronto FC II	Pacific FC	Free
21 December 2022	(England) Kian Williams	(Iceland) Keflavík IF	Valour FC	Free
21 December 2022	(Canada) Massimo Ferrin	Vaughan Azzurri	HFX Wanderers FC	Free
21 December 2022	(England) Elliot Simmons	Cavalry FC	Vancouver FC	Free
22 December 2022	(New Zealand) Moses Dyer	Valour FC	(United States) FC Tulsa	Free
22 December 2022	(Canada) Mamadou Kane	York United	Vancouver FC	Undisclosed
23 December 2022	(Argentina) Lisandro Cabrera	York United		Option Declined
23 December 2022	(Brazil) William Wallace	York United		Option Declined
23 December 2022	(Germany) Tobias Warschewski	York United		Option Declined
23 December 2022	(Canada) Felix N'sa	York United		Option Declined
3 January 2023	(England) Lifumpa Mwandwe	HFX Wanderers FC	(Wales) Newtown	Loan
4 January 2023	(Canada) Marcello Polisi	HFX Wanderers FC	Valour FC	Free
5 January 2023	(Canada) Ronan Kratt	York United	(Germany) Werder Bremen II	Loan
6 January 2023	(England) Jordan Brown	Pacific FC		Contract terminated
6 January 2023	(Brazil) Eduardo Jesus	York United	(Brazil) Botafogo B	Free
9 January 2023	(Canada) Brian Wright	Atlético Ottawa	York United	Free
11 January 2023	(France) Lorenzo Callegari	(France) Chambly	HFX Wanderers FC	Free
11 January 2023	(Canada) Clément Bayiha	(Norway) HamKam	York United	Undisclosed
12 January 2023	(Canada) Kahlil John-Wentworth	Simcoe County Rovers	Vancouver FC	Free
13 January 2023	(Netherlands) Bradley Vliet	Cavalry FC	Pacific FC	Free
13 January 2023	(Canada) Nathaniel St. Louis	(United States) UAB Blazers	Vancouver FC	Free
14 January 2023	(Canada) Marco Bustos	Pacific FC	(Sweden) IFK Värnamo	Free
15 January 2023	(Germany) Julian Roloff	Cavalry FC	(Germany) 1. FC Köln II	Free
16 January 2023	(Canada) Rocco Romeo	Valour FC	Vancouver FC	Free
17 January 2023	(Colombia) Sebastián Gutiérrez	York United	(Colombia) Valledupar F.C.	Free
18 January 2023	(Canada) Shamit Shome	Forge FC	Cavalry FC	Free
18 January 2023	(Canada) Yann Fillion	(Finland) IFK Mariehamn	HFX Wanderers FC	Free
18 January 2023	(Lebanon) Gabriel Bitar	FC Edmonton	Vancouver FC	Free
18 January 2023	(Canada) Juan Pablo Sanchez	(Portugal) S.C. Salgueiros	Valour FC	Free
18 January 2023	(Canada) Eskander Mzoughi	(Belgium) Oud-Heverlee Leuven U21s	Valour FC	Free
18 January 2023	(Canada) Jordan Wilson	York United	Retired	Retired
20 January 2023	(England) Ethan Beckford	Simcoe County Rovers	Cavalry FC	Free
20 January 2023	(Canada) Riley Ferrazzo	Vaughan Azzurri	HFX Wanderers FC	Free
20 January 2023	(Northern Ireland) Daryl Fordyce	Valour FC	Retired	Retired
22 January 2023	(Netherlands) Daniël Krutzen	Forge FC	(United States) Phoenix Rising FC	Free
23 January 2023	(France) Abdoul Sissoko	Atlético Ottawa	(Kuwait) Qadsia SC	Free
23 January 2023	(Algeria) Nassim Mekidèche	Valour FC	(United States) Sporting Kansas City II	Free
24 January 2023	(Netherlands) Oussama Alou	(Netherlands) FC Utrecht U21s	York United	Free
24 January 2023	(Canada) Marcus Simmons	FC Edmonton	Vancouver FC	Free
25 January 2023	(Canada) Ballou Tabla	Atlético Ottawa	(Turkey) Manisa F.K.	Undisclosed
25 January 2023	(Netherlands) Ayman Sellouf	(Netherlands) Jong Utrecht	Pacific FC	Free
25 January 2023	(England) Callum Watson	(United States) Creighton Bluejays	HFX Wanderers FC	Free
25 January 2023	(Jordan) Jaime Siaj	(Republic of Ireland) Finn Harps	Valour FC	Free
25 January 2023	(Lebanon) Tony Mikhael	Valour FC		Contract expired
25 January 2023	(United States) Jonathan Esparza	Valour FC		Contract expired
25 January 2023	(El Salvador) Gabriel Escobar	HFX Wanderers FC	TSS FC Rovers	Contract expired
25 January 2023	(Canada) Ryan Robinson	HFX Wanderers FC	Vaughan Azzurri	Contract expired
25 January 2023	(United States) Azriel Gonzalez	York United	(United States) Las Vegas Lights	Free
27 January 2023	(Canada) Terique Mohammed	FC Edmonton	(United States) Lexington SC	Free
28 January 2023	(Haiti) Bicou Bissainthe	Pacific FC	(Vietnam) Haiphong FC	Free
31 January 2023	(Canada) Adonijah Reid	(United States) Miami FC	Pacific FC	Free
31 January 2023	(Canada) Shaan Hundal	(United States) Inter Miami CF II	Vancouver FC	Free
31 January 2023	(Canada) Karl Ouimette	(United States) Indy Eleven	Atlético Ottawa	Free
1 February 2023	(Liberia) Brem Soumaoro	(Cyprus) PAEEK	York United	Free
1 February 2023	(Canada) Cale Loughrey	Forge FC	HFX Wanderers FC	Free
2 February 2023	(Peru) Jared Ulloa	(Peru) Sporting Cristal	Valour FC	Free
2 February 2023	(Canada) Tyler Crawford	(United States) Michigan State Spartans	Vancouver FC	Free
3 February 2023	(Canada) Noah Verhoeven	York United	Atlético Ottawa	Free
3 February 2023	(Canada) Tomas Giraldo	CF Montréal	HFX Wanderers FC	Free
6 February 2023	(Canada) Chrisnovic N'sa	York United	(United States) Huntsville City FC	Free
8 February 2023	(France) Théo Collomb	Whitecaps FC 2	HFX Wanderers	Free
9 February 2023	(Canada) Callum Montgomery	(United States) Minnesota United	Cavalry FC	Free
10 February 2023	(Canada) Dante Campbell	(United States) LA Galaxy II	Valour FC	Free
13 February 2023	(Nigeria) Udoka Chima	(England) Kings Langley	Cavalry FC	Free
15 February 2023	(Canada) Jean-Aniel Assi	CF Montreal	Atlético Ottawa	Loan
15 February 2023	(Canada) Ryan James	(United States) Birmingham Legion	HFX Wanderers FC	Free
16 February 2023	(Canada) Samuel Salter	HFX Wanderers FC	Atlético Ottawa	Undisclosed
17 February 2023	(Canada) Daniel Nimick	(United States) Western Michigan Broncos	HFX Wanderers FC	Free
20 February 2023	(Canada) Jordan Tisseur	FC Laval	Valour FC	U Sports contract
21 February 2023	(Cape Verde) Gianni dos Santos	Pacific FC	Atlético Ottawa	Free
22 February 2023	(Canada) Armaan Wilson	(United States) Providence Friars	HFX Wanderers FC	Free
23 February 2023	(Canada) Gabriel Antinoro	CF Montréal U23	Atlético Ottawa	Free
23 February 2023	(Belize) Eugene Martínez	(United States) Cal Poly Pomona Broncos	Vancouver FC	Free
23 February 2023	(Iran) Nima Moazeni Zadeh	Capilano Blues	Vancouver FC	Free
23 February 2023	(United States) Jeremy Zielinski	(United States) Hawaii Pacific Sharks	Vancouver FC	Free
24 February 2023	(Canada) Kosi Nwafornso	Vaughan Azzurri	HFX Wanderers FC	Free
28 February 2023	(England) Lifumpa Mwandwe	(Wales) Newtown	HFX Wanderers FC	Loan expired
28 February 2023	(Canada) Maël Henry	CF Montréal U23	Vancouver FC	Free
28 February 2023	(Mexico) Cristian Mares	(Mexico) Puebla	Vancouver FC	Loan
1 March 2023	(Mexico) Gael Sandoval	(Mexico) Tepatitlán	Vancouver FC	Free
2 March 2023	(Canada) Kieran Baskett	HFX Wanderers FC	Pacific FC	Free
2 March 2023	(Canada) Luke Singh	Toronto FC	Atlético Ottawa	Loan
3 March 2023	(Portugal) David Brazão	(Portugal) S.U. Sintrense	Pacific FC	Free
6 March 2023	(Canada) Kadin Chung	Toronto FC	Vancouver FC	Free
6 March 2023	(France) Guillaume Pianelli	UQTR Patriotes	Valour FC	U Sports Contract, Draft Pick
8 March 2023	(Canada) Jonathan Grant	Forge FC	York United FC	Free
8 March 2023	(France) Aboubakary Sacko	(France) Le Havre II	Atlético Ottawa	Free
8 March 2023	(Ghana) Nicky Gyimah	(England) Slough Town	Vancouver FC	Free
8 March 2023	(South Korea) Kwak Min-jae	(United States) Syracuse Pulse	Vancouver FC	Free
9 March 2023	(Canada) Anthony Novak	Cavalry FC	Valour FC	Free
10 March 2023	(Canada) Manjrekar James	(Ukraine) FC Chornomorets Odesa	Forge FC	Free
10 March 2023	(England) Ibrahim Bakare	(England) Cheshunt F.C.	Vancouver FC	Free
12 March 2023	(Canada) Ethan Schilte-Brown		HFX Wanderers FC	Developmental contract
12 March 2023	(Canada) Kimani Stewart-Baynes	Vaughan Azzurri U19	HFX Wanderers FC	Developmental contract
17 March 2023	(Canada) Sterling Kerr	Mount Royal Cougars	Cavalry FC	U-Sports Contract
17 March 2023	(Canada) Joseph Holliday	FC Edmonton	Cavalry FC	Developmental contract
21 March 2023	(Canada) Matthew Catavolo	Valour FC	Toronto FC II	Undisclosed
22 March 2023	(Canada) Anthony White	Toronto Varsity Blues	Vancouver FC	Signed Draft Pick
22 March 2023	(Iraq) Ameer Kinani	TMU Bold	Vancouver FC	U Sports contract, Draft Pick
23 March 2023	(Canada) Theo Afework	(Germany) 1. FC Nürnberg U19	York United FC	Free
25 March 2023	(Canada) David Norman Jr.	Cavalry FC	(England) Northampton Town	Free
3 April 2023	(The Gambia) Kekuta Manneh	(United States) San Antonio FC	Pacific FC	Free
4 April 2023	(Canada) Jacob Carlos	Valour FC	North Toronto Nitros	Free
4 April 2023	(Canada) Aiden Rushenas	Dalhousie Tigers	HFX Wanderers FC	U-Sports Contract
6 April 2023	(Canada) Matthew Chandler	(United States) Wisconsin Badgers	Valour FC	Free
12 April 2023	(Canada) Eric Lajeunesse	UBC Thunderbirds	Pacific FC	U-Sports Contract
12 April 2023	(Canada) Sami Marvasti		Pacific FC	Developmental contract
12 April 2023	(Canada) Jack Garner		Pacific FC	Developmental contract
14 April 2023	(Canada) Khadim Kane	CF Montreal U23	Forge FC	Free
14 April 2023	(Canada) Malcolm Duncan	Sigma FC	Forge FC	Free
14 April 2023	(Canada) Junior Agyekum	TRU Wolfpack	Atlético Ottawa	U-Sports contract
14 April 2023	(Canada) William Omoreniye	Calgary Dinos	Cavalry FC	U-Sports contract
14 April 2023	(Canada) Eryk Kobza	Calgary Dinos	Cavalry FC	U-Sports contract
14 April 2023	(France) Emmanuel Robe	(England) Romford	Vancouver FC	Free
14 April 2023	(Mexico) Cristian Mares	Vancouver FC	(Mexico) Puebla	Loan terminated
14 April 2023	(Canada) Ivan Pavela	ProStars FC	York United FC	Developmental contract
14 April 2023	(Canada) Toby Richardson	West Ottawa SC	York United FC	Developmental contract
17 April 2023	(Canada) Noah Abatneh	(Italy) Lazio	York United FC	Free
18 April 2023	(Canada) Emmanuel Marmolejo	Sigma FC Academy	Forge FC	Developmental contract
20 April 2023	(Canada) Rimi Olatunji	(United States) Peoria City	Forge FC	Short-term contract
21 April 2023	(Canada) Tyr Walker	Carleton Ravens	Atlético Ottawa	U-Sports contract
24 April 2023	(France) Bradley Kamdem	(Malta) Valletta F.C.	Cavalry FC	Free
27 April 2023	(Canada) Klaidi Cela	Vaughan Azzurri	Valour FC	Free
4 May 2023	(Canada) James Cameron		Vancouver FC	Developmental contact
4 May 2023	(Canada) Lennon Thompson	TSS FC Rovers	Vancouver FC	Developmental contract
4 May 2023	(Canada) Kourosh Jamshidi	Richmond Hill SC	Vancouver FC	Developmental contract
6 May 2023	(Canada) Brogan Engbers		Atlético Ottawa	Short-term contract
6 May 2023	(Canada) Taryck Tahid	VanCity PFA	Vancouver FC	Free
9 June 2023	(Canada) Camilo Vasconcelos	Guelph United FC	York United FC	Developmental contract
9 June 2023	(Canada) Trivine Esprit	Darby FC	York United FC	Short-term contract, Draft pick
9 June 2023	(Canada) Anthony Morano	North Mississauga SC	York United FC	Developmental contract
13 June 2023	(Nigeria) Kosi Nwafornso	HFX Wanderers FC		Mutual termination
13 June 2023	(Canada) Ethan Schilte-Brown	HFX Wanderers FC		Developmental contract ended
25 June 2023	(Canada) Daniel Firek	Sigma FC	Forge FC	Developmental contract
25 June 2023	(Canada) Simon Guardiero	Sigma FC	Forge FC	Developmental contract
25 June 2023	(Canada) Kevaughn Tavernier	Sigma FC	Forge FC	Developmental contract
28 June 2023	(Netherlands) Lassana Faye	York United	(Netherlands) SC Telstar	Undisclosed
28 June 2023	(Canada) Junior Agyekum	Atlético Ottawa		Mutual termination
29 June 2023	(Canada) Emmanuel Robe	Vancouver FC		Mutual termination
29 June 2023	(Canada) Maël Henry	Vancouver FC	Cavalry FC	Inter-league swap
29 June 2023	(Canada) Mikaël Cantave	Cavalry FC	Vancouver FC	Inter-league swap
29 June 2023	(Canada) Omar Darwish	Ottawa South United	Atlético Ottawa	Development contract
5 July 2023	(Switzerland) Rubén del Campo	(Spain) San Fernando CD	Atlético Ottawa	Free
5 July 2023	(Spain) Alberto Zapater	(Spain) Real Zaragoza	Atlético Ottawa	Free
7 July 2023	(Canada) Trevor Schneider	Altitude FC	Vancouver FC	Short-term Relief Player
10 July 2023	(Canada) José Escalante	Cavalry FC	(Honduras) Montagua	One-year loan
11 July 2023	(Mexico) Alejandro Díaz	(Norway) Sogndal	Vancouver FC	One year loan
12 July 2023	(Canada) Trivine Esprit	Darby FC	York United FC	U Sports contract
13 July 2023	(Brazil) Renan Garcia	Unattached	Vancouver FC	Free
13 July 2023	(Canada) Kourosh Jamshidi	Vancouver FC		Developmental contract expired
13 July 2023	(Mexico) Gael Sandoval	Vancouver FC	(Mexico) UdeG	Mutual termination
14 July 2023	(South Sudan) William Akio	(Scotland) Ross County	Cavalry FC	Undisclosed
18 July 2023	(Canada) Doneil Henry	Unattached	HFX Wanderers FC	Free
19 July 2023	(Canada) Carson Buschman-Dormond	(Estonia) Viljandi JK Tulevik	York United FC	Free
22 July 2023	(United States) Ahinga Selemani	(United States) One Knoxville SC	Valour FC	Undisclosed
23 July 2023	(Canada) Michael Williams	North Mississauga SC	York United FC	Developmental contract
27 July 2023	(Belgium) Beni Badibanga	(Belgium) RAAL La Louvière	Forge FC	Free
28 July 2023	(Greece) Ilias Iliadis	CF Montréal	Atlético Ottawa	Loan
31 July 2023	(Canada) Ashtone Morgan	Forge FC	Retired	Retired
3 August 2023	(Peru) Vasco Fry	Whitecaps FC 2	Vancouver FC	Loan
3 August 2023	(Belize) Eugene Martínez	Vancouver FC		Mutual termination
3 August 2023	(Canada) Kahlil John-Wentworth	Vancouver FC		Mutual termination
3 August 2023	(Canada) Yorgos Gavas		HFX Wanderers FC	Development contract
4 August 2023	(Canada) Adisa De Rosario	Toronto FC II	York United FC	Loan
5 August 2023	(Netherlands) Oussama Alou	Vancouver FC		Mutual termination
5 August 2023	(Colombia) Ivan Mejia	TSS Rovers	Vancouver FC	Free
7 August 2023	(Canada) Jordan Perruzza	Toronto FC	HFX Wanderers FC	Loan
11 August 2023	(Republic of Ireland) Tom Field	Calgary Foothills FC	Cavalry FC	Free
