= 2023 York United FC season =

York United FC
2023 season
- Head coach: Martin Nash
- Stadium: York Lions Stadium
- Canadian Premier League: 5th
- CPL playoffs: Play-in round
- Canadian Championship: Quarter-finals
- Top goalscorer: League: Three players (6 each); All: Molham Babouli (7)
- Highest home attendance: 1,827 (May 10 vs Vancouver Whitecaps FC)
- Average home league attendance: 1,242
Home colours	Away colours	Third colours

The 2023 York United FC season was the fifth season in the history of York United FC. In addition to the Canadian Premier League, the club also competed in the Canadian Championship.

In April during the 2023 season, the club was sold from the Baldassarra family to Canadian Soccer Business, with plans to transfer the club to new ownership.

== Squad ==
As of September 6, 2023.

No.	Player	Nationality	Position(s)	Date of birth (age)	Previous club
Goalkeepers
1	Niko Giantsopoulos	(Canada)	GK	June 24, 1994 (aged 29)	(Canada) Cavalry FC
67	Eleias Himaras	(Canada)	GK	March 8, 2002 (aged 21)	(Canada) Electric City
Defenders
2	Paris Gee	(Canada)	LB / RB	July 5, 1994 (aged 29)	(Canada) FC Edmonton
3	Tass Mourdoukoutas	(Australia)	CB	March 3, 1999 (aged 24)	(Australia) Western Sydney Wanderers
6	Roger Thompson	(Canada)	CB	December 19, 1991 (aged 32)	(Sweden) Ljungskile SK
7	Jonathan Grant	(Canada)	RB	October 15, 1993 (aged 30)	(Canada) Forge FC
23	Noah Abatneh	(Canada)	RB / CB	September 28, 2004 (aged 19)	(Italy) AC Campodarsego
30	Kadin Martin-Pereux	(Canada)	FB / MF	October 9, 2002 (aged 21)	(Germany) SC Paderborn 07 II
32	Brem Soumaoro	(Liberia)	CB / DM	August 8, 1996 (aged 27)	(Cyprus) PAEEK
55	Toby Richardson	(Canada)	DF	August 13, 2005 (aged 18)	(Canada) West Ottawa SC
Midfielders
8	Elijah Adekugbe	(Canada)	MF	July 17, 1996 (aged 27)	(Canada) Cavalry FC
11	Kevin Dos Santos	(Portugal)	LW / RW	October 20, 1999 (aged 24)	(England) Darlington F.C.
12	Clément Bayiha	(Canada)	RW / RB	March 8, 1999 (aged 24)	(Norway) Hamarkameratene
16	Max Ferrari	(Canada)	LW / RW	August 20, 2000 (aged 23)	(Canada) Aurora FC
27	Carson Buschman-Dormond	(Canada)	LW / RW	October 27, 2002 (aged 21)	(Switzerland) FC Zürich U21
28	Jérémy Gagnon-Laparé	(Canada)	CM	March 9, 1995 (aged 28)	(Canada) HFX Wanderers
33	Matthew Baldisimo	(Philippines) / (Canada)	DM / CM	January 20, 1998 (aged 25)	(Canada) Pacific FC
47	Trivine Esprit	(Canada)	MF	February 14, 2002 (aged 21)	(Canada) Darby FC
70	Markiyan Voytsekhovskyy	(Ukraine) / (Canada)	AM / LW / RW	November 27, 2003 (aged 20)	(Canada) ProStars FC
	Adriano Iannello	(Canada)	MF		(Canada) York United FC Academy
	Shola Jimoh	(Canada)	LW	April 8, 2008 (aged 15)	(Canada) York United FC Academy
Forwards
9	Brian Wright	(Canada)	CF	March 24, 1995 (aged 28)	(Canada) Atlético Ottawa
14	Theo Afework	(Canada)	CF	January 24, 2004 (aged 19)	(Germany) Nürnberg U19
18	Molham Babouli	(Syria) / (Canada)	CF / LW / RW	February 1, 1993 (aged 30)	(Qatar) Muaither SC
22	Austin Ricci	(Canada)	CF	April 8, 1996 (aged 27)	(Canada) Valour FC
24	Osaze De Rosario	(Guyana)	ST	July 19, 2001 (aged 22)	(Ukraine) Rukh Lviv

== Transfers ==
=== In ===
No.	Pos.	Player	From club	Fee/notes	Date	Source
	FW	(Germany) Tobias Warschewski	(Canada) FC Edmonton	Return from loan	November 30, 2022	
	DF	(Canada) Felix N'sa	(Canada) FC Edmonton	Return from loan	November 30, 2022	
	MF	(United States) Azriel Gonzalez	(Canada) FC Edmonton	Return from loan	November 30, 2022	
	FW	(Canada) Mouhamadou Kane	(Canada) FC Edmonton	Return from loan	November 30, 2022	
8	MF	(Canada) Elijah Adekugbe	(Canada) Cavalry FC	Free	December 1, 2022	
28	MF	(Canada) Jérémy Gagnon-Laparé	(Canada) HFX Wanderers	Free	December 9, 2022	
43	DF	(Netherlands) Lassana Faye	(Ukraine) FC Rukh Lviv	Free	December 9, 2022	
70	MF	(Ukraine) Markiyan Voytsekhovskyy	(Canada) ProStars FC	Free	December 14, 2022	
33	MF	(Canada) Matthew Baldisimo	(Canada) Pacific FC	Free	December 15, 2022	
9	FW	(Canada) Brian Wright	(Canada) Atlético Ottawa	Free	January 9, 2023	
12	DF	(Canada) Clément Bayiha	(Norway) Hamarkameratene	Undisclosed fee	January 11, 2023	
10	MF	(Netherlands) Oussama Alou	(Netherlands) Jong FC Utrecht	Free	January 24, 2023	
32	DF	(Liberia) Brem Soumaoro	(Cyprus) PAEEK	Free	February 1, 2023	
7	DF	(Canada) Jonathan Grant	(Canada) Forge FC	Free	March 8, 2023	
14	FW	(Canada) Theo Afework	(Germany) Nürnberg U19	Free	March 23, 2023	
77	GK	(Canada) Ivan Pavela	(Canada) ProStars FC	Developmental contract	April 17, 2023	
77	CB	(Canada) Toby Richardson	(Canada) West Ottawa SC	Developmental contract	April 17, 2023	
23	DF	(Canada) Noah Abatneh	(Italy) AC Campodarsego	Free	April 17, 2023	
47	MW	(Canada) Trivine Esprit	(Canada) Darby FC	Selected 11th overall in the 2023 CPL–U Sports Draft, signed a CPL-U SPORTS contract	July 10, 2023	
27	MF	(Canada) Carson Buschman-Dormond	(Switzerland) FC Zürich U21	Free	July 19, 2023	
30	DF	(Canada) Kadin Martin-Pereux	(Germany) SC Paderborn 07 II	Free	September 6, 2023	
	MF	(Canada) Shola Jimoh	(Canada) York United FC Academy	Developmental contract	September 6, 2023	
	MF	(Canada) Adriano Iannello	(Canada) York United FC Academy	Developmental contract	September 6, 2023	

==== Loans in ====
No.	Pos.	Player	Loaned from	Fee/notes	Date	Source
77	GK	(Canada) Adisa De Rosario	(Canada) Toronto FC II	Loaned until end of season, recalled early September 15, 2023	August 4, 2023	

==== Draft picks ====
York United selected the following players in the 2023 CPL–U Sports Draft. Draft picks are not automatically signed to the team roster. Only those who are signed to a contract will be listed as transfers in.

Round	Selection	Pos.	Player	Nationality	University
1	4	MF	Christopher Campoli	Canada	Ontario Tech
2	11	MF	Trivine Esprit	Canada	Ontario Tech

=== Out ===
==== Transferred out ====
No.	Pos.	Player	To club	Fee/notes	Date	Source
7	MF	(Brazil) Oliver Minatel	Retired		October 11, 2022	
11	FW	(Czech Republic) Martin Graiciar		Contract terminated by mutual consent	November 16, 2022	
33	MF	(Canada) Matthew Baldisimo	(Canada) Pacific FC	End of loan	November 30, 2022	
5	DF	(Canada) Dominick Zator	(Poland) Korona Kielce	Contract expired	December 12, 2022	
44	MF	(Canada) Isaiah Johnston	(United States) Huntsville City FC	Undisclosed fee	December 19, 2022	
10	MF	(Argentina) Mateo Hernández	(Bolivia) Real Tomayapo	Option declined	December 21, 2022	
17	FW	(Canada) Mouhamadou Kane	(Canada) Vancouver FC	Undisclosed fee	December 22, 2022	
23	DF	(Canada) Chrisnovic N'sa	(United States) Huntsville City FC	Contract expired	December 23, 2022	
19	MF	(Canada) Noah Verhoeven	(Canada) Atlético Ottawa	Option declined	December 23, 2022	
8	MF	(Colombia) Sebastián Gutiérrez	(Colombia) Valledupar F.C.	Option declined	December 23, 2022	
99	MF	(Brazil) William Wallace		Option declined	December 23, 2022	
9	FW	(Argentina) Lisandro Cabrera	(Paraguay) Sol de América	Option declined	December 23, 2022	
25	FW	(Australia) Luis Lawrie-Lattanzio	(Australia) Campbelltown City	Option declined	December 23, 2022	
2	DF	(Brazil) Eduardo Jesus	(Brazil) Botafogo B	Contract terminated by mutual consent	December 23, 2022	
	FW	(Germany) Tobias Warschewski		Option declined	December 23, 2022	
	MF	(United States) Azriel Gonzalez	(United States) Las Vegas Lights	Option declined	December 23, 2022	
	DF	(Canada) Felix N'sa		Option declined	December 23, 2022	
4	DF	(Canada) Jordan Wilson	Retired		January 18, 2023	
27	FW	(Canada) Ronan Kratt	(Germany) Werder Bremen II	Undisclosed fee to make loan permanent move	June 20, 2023	
43	DF	(Netherlands) Lassana Faye	(Netherlands) SC Telstar	Undisclosed fee	June 28, 2023	
10	MF	(Netherlands) Oussama Alou		Contract terminated by mutual consent	August 4, 2023	

==== Loans out ====
No.	Pos.	Player	Loaned to	Fee/notes	Date	Source
27	FW	(Canada) Ronan Kratt	(Germany) Werder Bremen II	Loaned until July 1, 2023	January 5, 2023	
21	MF	(Canada) Michael Petrasso	(England) Maidstone United	Loaned until December 31, 2023	September 6, 2023	

== Pre-season and friendlies ==
Win Draw Loss Fixtures

February 22, 2023 Friendly	York United FC	4–0	CF Montréal U23	Toronto, Ontario
	Voytsekhovskyy dos Santos; Esprit	Report

March 4, 2023 Friendly	Penn State Nittany Lions	0-0	York United FC	University Park, Pennsylvania
		Report		Stadium: Jeffrey Field

March 8, 2023 Friendly	Houston Dynamo 2	2–1	York United FC	Houston, Texas
	Goal	Report	De Rosario	Stadium: Aveva Stadium

March 19, 2023 Friendly	Toronto FC II	0–2	York United FC	Toronto, Ontario
7:45 PM		Report	dos Santos 38'; De Rosario 59'	Stadium: BMO Training Centre at Downsview Park; Referee: Yusri Rudolph

March 25, 2023 Friendly	Simcoe County Rovers FC	v	York United FC	Vaughan, Ontario
				Stadium: Ontario Soccer Centre
Note: Game cancelled due to York United FC injuries

April 1, 2023 Friendly	Forge FC	v	York United FC	Hamilton, Ontario
				Stadium: Tim Hortons Field; Referee: Marie-Soleil Beaudoin
Note: Game played behind closed doors

April 9, 2023 Friendly	Alliance United FC	v	York United FC	Ontario
				Referee: Scott Bowman
Note: Game played behind closed doors

== Competitions ==
Matches are listed in Toronto local time: Eastern Daylight Time (UTC−4) until November 5, and Eastern Standard Time (UTC−5) otherwise.

=== Overview ===
Competition	Record							
Competition	Pld	W	D	L	GF	GA	GD	Win %
Canadian Premier League	28	11	5	12	35	44	−9	39.29
Canadian Championship	2	1	0	1	2	4	−2	50.00
Total	30	12	5	13	37	48	−11	40.00

Last updated: October 7, 2023
Source: Competitions

=== Canadian Premier League ===
==== Table ====
Pos	Team	Pld	W	D	L	GF	GA	GD	Pts	Playoff qualification
1	Cavalry (S)	28	16	7	5	46	27	+19	55	First semifinal
2	Forge (C)	28	11	9	8	39	32	+7	42 (Note: Tie resolved by away goal differential; Forge: +4, Wanderers: −2)	First semifinal
3	HFX Wanderers	28	11	9	8	39	32	+7	42	Quarterfinal
4	Pacific	28	11	7	10	42	35	+7	40	Play-in round
5	York United	28	11	5	12	35	44	−9	38	Play-in round
6	Atlético Ottawa	28	10	6	12	38	34	+4	36	
7	Vancouver	28	8	5	15	28	50	−22	29	
8	Valour	28	6	8	14	25	38	−13	26	

Source: CanPL
Rules for classification: 1) Points; 2) Total wins; 3) Goal difference; 4) Goals scored; 5) Away goal differential; 6) Away goals scored; 7) Home goal differential; 8) Home goals scored; 9) Total minutes played by U-21 players; 10) Coin toss (2 teams tied) or drawing of lots (3+ teams tied).
(C) Champion (qualified to Champions Cup); (S) CPL Shield winner (qualified to Champions Cup)

==== Results by match ====
Match	1	2	3	4	5	6	7	8	9	10	11	12	13	14	15	16	17	18	19	20	21	22	23	24	25	26	27	28
Result	L	L	W	L	L	W	W	W	D	W	L	D	L	W	L	D	W	L	D	D	L	W	W	L	L	L	W	W
Position	8	8	5	7	8	5	3	3	3	2	2	4	4	3	5	6	6	6	6	6	6	6	6	6	6	6	5	5

Updated to match(es) played on October 7, 2023. Source: #Matches
W = Win; D = Draw; L = Loss

==== Matches ====
April 16 1	York United FC	0–2	Valour FC	Toronto, Ontario
2:00pm	Gagnon-Laparé (yellow card) 16'; Ferrari (yellow card) 46'; Grant (yellow card) 66'; Wright (yellow card) 80'	Report	Ohin (yellow card) 25'; Baquero (yellow card) 25'; Grant 51' (o.g.); Novak 54'; Campbell (yellow card) 83'; Yesli (yellow card) 90+2'	Stadium: York Lions Stadium; Attendance: 1,607; Referee: Renzo Villanueva

April 22 2	York United FC	1–2	Vancouver FC	Toronto, Ontario
1:00pm	Voytsekhovskyy 35'	Report	Hundal 6', (yellow card) 42'; Sandoval 18' (pen.); Moazenizadeh (yellow card) 50'; Kinani (yellow card) 70'; Kwak (yellow card) 81'; Romeo (yellow card) 82'; Gyimah (yellow card) 90+5'	Stadium: York Lions Stadium; Attendance: 822; Referee: Ben Hoskins

April 29 3	Atlético Ottawa	0–1	York United FC	Ottawa, Ontario
5:00pm	Espejo (yellow card) 53'	Report	Babouli 42', (yellow card) 90+5'; Alou (yellow card) 44'; Gee (yellow card) 90+1'; Faye (yellow card) 90+5'	Stadium: TD Place Stadium; Attendance: 3,074; Referee: Mathieu Souaré

May 5 4	York United FC	0–1	Forge FC	Toronto, Ontario
7:30pm	Adekugbe (yellow card) 67'; Alou (yellow card) 76'	Report	Campbell 21'; Rama (yellow card) 39'; Owolabi-Belewu (yellow card) 68'; Poku (yellow card) 80'; Morgan (red card) 90+1'; Kane (yellow card) 90+6'; Sissoko (yellow card) 90+7'	Stadium: York Lions Stadium; Attendance: 1,016; Referee: Myriam Marcotte

May 14 5	Pacific FC	4–1	York United FC	Langford, British Columbia
6:00pm	Didic 7'; Aparicio 42'; Mukumbilwa (yellow card) 61'; Brazão 82'; Ongaro 90+2'	Report	dos Santos 55'; Faye (yellow card) 60'	Stadium: Starlight Stadium; Attendance: 3,027; Referee: Scott Bowman

May 20 6	HFX Wanderers FC	0–3	York United	Halifax, Nova Scotia
2:00pm	Ferrin (yellow card) 67'; Ferrazzo (yellow card) 90+2'	Report	Baldisimo 11', (yellow card) 23'; Alou 31'; Soumaoro 46'	Stadium: Wanderers Grounds; Attendance: 6,244; Referee: Renzo Villanueva

May 28 7	York United FC	1–0	Cavalry FC	Toronto, Ontario
5:00pm	Bayiha 23'	Report	Kobza (yellow card) 35'; Trafford (yellow card) 90'; Chima (yellow card) 90+8'	Stadium: York Lions Stadium; Attendance: 1,476; Referee: Ben Hoskins

May 31 8	Forge FC	1–2	York United FC	Hamilton, Ontario
7:00pm	Rama (yellow card) 10'; Henry (yellow card) 10'; James (yellow card) 25'; Campbell 76'; Jensen (yellow card) 84'	Report	Hojabrpour 53' (o.g.); De Rosario (yellow card) 68'; Faye (yellow card) 70'; Ricci (yellow card) 74'; Babouli (yellow card) 80'; Giantsopoulos (yellow card) 83'; Soumaoro 90+3'	Stadium: Tim Hortons Field; Referee: Mathieu Souaré

June 4 9	Valour FC	1–1	York United FC	Winnipeg, Manitoba
3:00pm	de Brienne (yellow card) 40', (goal) 72'; Gutiérrez (yellow card) 45'; Cela (yellow card) 77'	Report	Soumaoro (yellow card) 27'; Babouli 49'; Faye (yellow card) 84'; Gee (yellow card) 90+6'	Stadium: IG Field; Attendance: 3,352; Referee: Michael Venne

June 9 10	York United FC	2–1	Atlético Ottawa	Toronto, Ontario
7:30pm	Singh 24' (o.g.); Ricci (yellow card) 43'; De Rosario 80'	Report	Verhoven 8', (yellow card) 51'	Stadium: York Lions Stadium; Attendance: 891; Referee: Scott Bowman

June 18 11	Pacific FC	1–0	York United FC	Langford, British Columbia
7:00pm	Toussaint (yellow card) 50'; Meilleur-Giguère (yellow card) 54'; Aparicio (yellow card) 56'; Daniels (yellow card) 81'; Young 88'	Report	Soumaoro (yellow card) 40'; Babouli (yellow card) 45+1'; Ricci (yellow card) 56'; Gee (yellow card) 73'	Stadium: Starlight Stadium; Attendance: 2,741; Referee: Mario Alayass

June 21 12	York United FC	2–2	HFX Wanderers FC	Toronto, Ontario
7:00pm	Babouli 14'; Gee (yellow card) 43'; dos Santos 56', (yellow card) 57'; Gagnon-Laparé (yellow card) 90+7'	Report	Daniels (yellow card) 31', (goal) 86'; Coimbra 35', (yellow card) 48'; Campagna (yellow card) 90+4'; Nimick (yellow card) 90+6'; Callegari (yellow card) 90+7'	Stadium: York Lions Stadium; Attendance: 1,013; Referee: Fabrizio Stasolla

June 24 13	Cavalry FC	2–1	York United FC	Calgary, Alberta
5:00pm	Ntignee (yellow card) 20', (goal) 51'; Aird (yellow card) 34'; Musse 83'; Mason (yellow card) 86'; Escalante (yellow card) 90+6'	Report	Gagnon-Laparé (yellow card) 50'; Babouli (yellow card) 54', (goal) 57'; Thompson (yellow card) 81'	Stadium: ATCO Field; Attendance: 4,404; Referee: Marie-Soleil Beaudoin

July 2 14	Vancouver FC	1–2	York United FC	Langley, British Columbia
6:00pm	Hundal 6'; Bakare (yellow card) 68'; Gyimah (yellow card) 88'	Report	Alou 4'; De Rosario 79'; Adekugbe (yellow card) 87'; Baldisimo (yellow card) 90+2'	Stadium: Willoughby Community Park; Attendance: 2,482; Referee: Ben Hoskins

July 9 15	York United FC	0-4	Forge FC	Toronto, Ontario
7:00pm	Ricci (yellow card) 35'; Babouli (red card) 85'	Report	Jensen (yellow card) 15'; Campbell 25' 33' 54'; Owolabi-Belewu (yellow card) 36'; James (yellow card) 45+3'; Borges 47'; Rama (yellow card) 63'; Pacius (yellow card) 90+2'	Stadium: York Lions Stadium; Attendance: 1,464; Referee: Yusri Rudolf

July 14 16	York United FC	0–0	Pacific FC	Toronto, Ontario
7:30pm	Gee (yellow card) 33'; Mourdoukoutas (yellow card) 49'; Ferrari (yellow card) 90'	Report	Toussaint (yellow card) 60'; Daniels (yellow card) 66'; Lajeunesse (yellow card) 74'	Stadium: York Lions Stadium; Attendance: 1,464; Referee: Carly Shaw-MacLaren

July 23 17	Valour FC	1–2	York United FC	Winnipeg, Manitoba
3:00pm	Williams 10' (yellow card) 33'; Mzoughi (yellow card) 45'; Rendón (yellow card) 90+2'	Report	Ricci 4'; De Rosario 8'; Gagnon-Laparé (yellow card) 52'; Giantsopoulos (yellow card) 90+1'	Stadium: IG Field; Attendance: 3,423; Referee: Seyed Mohseni

July 30 18	York United FC	0-2	HFX Wanderers FC	Toronto, Ontario
2:00pm	Ferrari (yellow card) 49'; Ricci (yellow card) 60'; Baldisimo (yellow card) 90+2' (yellow-red card) 90+3'; dos Santos (yellow card) 90+5'; Thompson (yellow card) 90+7'; Giantsopoulos (yellow card) 90+7'	Report	Fernandez 45'; Morelli 61'; Coimbra (yellow card) 90+6'	Stadium: York Lions Stadium; Attendance: 1,490; Referee: Scott Bowman

August 5 19	Atlético Ottawa	3-3	York United FC	Ottawa, Ontario
7:00pm	Haworth 35' 59'; Espejo (yellow card) 45+2' (goal) 81'	Report	Wright 24'; dos Santos 26'; Ingham 62' (o.g.); Gee (yellow card) 63'; Soumaoro (yellow card) 74'	Stadium: TD Place Stadium; Attendance: 5,200; Referee: David Barrie

August 12 20	Forge FC	3-3	York United FC	Hamilton, Ontario
7:00pm	Bekker 27' (yellow card) 68'; Borges (yellow card) 45+1'; Campbell 54' 76'; Owolabi-Belewu (yellow card) 89'	Report	Gee (yellow card) 38'; Gagnon-Laparé (yellow card) 45+1'; dos Santos 48'; Wright 66'; Babouli 70' (yellow card) 74'	Stadium: Tim Hortons Field; Referee: Renzo Villanueva

August 20 21	Cavalry FC	2-1	York United FC	Calgary, Alberta
5:00pm	Musse 1'; Klomp (yellow card) 39'; Akio 47'; Carducci (yellow card) 90+2'	Report	Soumaoro (yellow card) 32'; Babouli (yellow card) 52'; Bayiha 63'; Adekugbe (yellow card) 72'; Buschman-Dormond (red card) 90+7'	Stadium: ATCO Field; Attendance: 4,608; Referee: Michael Venne

August 25 22	York United FC	2-1	Vancouver FC	Toronto, Ontario
7:30pm	Babouli 69' (pen.); Ricci 80'	Report	Bitar 11'; Fry (yellow card) 90+5'	Stadium: York Lions Stadium; Attendance: 1,200; Referee: Fabrizio Stasolla

September 4 23	HFX Wanderers FC	1-2	York United FC	Halifax, Nova Scotia
2:00pm	Perruzza 31'; Henry (yellow card) 62'; Nimick (yellow card) 90+7'	Report	Ricci 45+2'; Abatneh (yellow card) 55'; Thompson 63'; Soumaoro (yellow card) 75'; A. De Rosario (yellow card) 90+4'	Stadium: Wanderers Grounds; Referee: Marie Soleil-Beaudoin

September 8 24	York United FC	1-3	Valour FC	Toronto, Ontario
7:00pm	Abatneh (red card) 39'; O. De Rosario (yellow card) 80'; dos Santos 87'; Babouli (yellow card) 90+1' (yellow-red card) 90+3'	Report	Campbell 29'; Ponce (yellow card) 32'; Haynes (yellow card) 54'; Gutiérrez 62'; Cela (yellow card) 73'; Ulloa 84'	Stadium: York Lions Stadium; Attendance: 1,118; Referee: Mathieu Souaré

September 17 25	York United FC	1-4	Pacific FC	Toronto, Ontario
5:00pm	Esprit (yellow card) 34'; Ricci (yellow card) 63'; Gagnon-Laparé (yellow card) 75'; De Rosario 86'	Report	Meilleur-Giguère 11'; Young 18'; Aparicio (yellow card) 40' (goal) 62'; Brazão 79'; Ongaro (yellow card) 90+3'	Stadium: York Lions Stadium; Attendance: 1,151; Referee: Myriam Marcotte

September 22 26	York United FC	0-1	Cavalry FC	Toronto, Ontario
7:30pm	Ricci (yellow card) 12'; Gagnon-Laparé (yellow card) 26'	Report	Camargo 39'; Henry (yellow card) 48'; Smith-Doyle (yellow card) 84'; Daley (yellow card) 90'	Stadium: York Lions Stadium; Attendance: 890; Referee: Scott Bowman

October 1 27	York United FC	1-0	Atlético Ottawa	Toronto, Ontario
2:00pm	Soumaoro (yellow card) 38'; dos Santos 88' (yellow card) 90+5'	Report	Salter (yellow card) 41'; Haworth (yellow card) 83'; Antinoro (yellow card) 90+1'; Espejo (yellow card) 90+6'	Stadium: York Lions Stadium; Referee: David Barrie

October 6 28	Vancouver FC	1-2	York United FC	Langley, British Columbia
10:30pm	Garcia (yellow card) 4'; Cantave 39'; Chung (yellow card) 47'; Fry (yellow card) 81'	Report	De Rosario 17' 27'; Ricci (yellow card) 45+2' (yellow-red card) 90+5'; Baldisimo (yellow card) 75'; dos Santos (yellow card) 90+8'	Stadium: Willoughby Community Park; Attendance: 1,783; Referee: Michael Venne

==== Playoff matches ====
October 11 Play-In Round	Pacific FC	1-0	York United FC	Langford, British Columbia
10:00pm	Young (yellow card) 40'; Reid 90+1'; Ongaro (yellow card) 90+4'	Report	Ferrari (yellow card) 67'; Martin-Pereux (yellow card) 88'	Stadium: Starlight Stadium; Referee: Ben Hoskins

=== Canadian Championship ===
April 19 Preliminary Round	York United FC	1–0	Vancouver FC	Toronto, Ontario
8:00pm	Babouli 6' (pen.) (yellow card) 18'; Ricci (yellow card) 71'; Gee (yellow card) 75'; Giantsopoulos (yellow card) 87'	Report	Bakare (yellow card) 2'; Simmons (yellow card) 33'	Stadium: York Lions Stadium; Referee: Michael Venne

May 10 Quarter-finals	York United FC	1–4	Vancouver Whitecaps FC	Toronto, Ontario
7:30pm	Ricci 90'; Soumaoro (yellow card) 90+1'	Report	Adekugbe 64' (o.g.); Becher 76'; Johnson 88'; Gressel 90+1' (pen.); Takaoka (yellow card) 90+3'	Stadium: York Lions Stadium; Attendance: 1,827; Referee: Drew Fischer

== Statistics ==
=== Squad and statistics ===
As of October 12, 2023

No.	Pos	Nat	Player	Total		Canadian Premier League		Canadian Championship	
No.	Pos	Nat	Player	Apps	Goals	Apps	Goals	Apps	Goals
Goalkeepers
1	GK	(Canada) CAN	Niko Giantsopoulos	25	0	23+0	0	2+0	0
67	GK	(Canada) CAN	Eleias Himaras	2	0	2+0	0	0+0	0
77	GK	(United States) USA	Adisa De Rosario	4	0	4+0	0	0+0	0
Defenders
2	DF	(Canada) CAN	Paris Gee	28	0	26+0	0	2+0	0
3	DF	(Australia) AUS	Tass Mourdoukoutas	23	0	21+1	0	1+0	0
6	DF	(Canada) CAN	Roger Thompson	16	1	13+2	1	1+0	0
7	DF	(Canada) CAN	Jonathan Grant	17	0	12+4	0	1+0	0
23	DF	(Canada) CAN	Noah Abatneh	12	0	8+4	0	0+0	0
30	DF	(Canada) CAN	Kadin Martin-Pereux	6	0	3+3	0	0+0	0
32	DF	(Liberia) LBR	Brem Soumaoro	27	2	25+0	2	2+0	0
43	DF	(Netherlands) NED	Lassana Faye	14	0	11+1	0	1+1	0
Midfielders
8	MF	(Canada) CAN	Elijah Adekugbe	16	0	5+10	0	1+0	0
10	MF	(Netherlands) NED	Oussama Alou	18	2	11+5	2	2+0	0
11	MF	(Portugal) POR	Kevin Dos Santos	29	6	19+8	6	1+1	0
12	MF	(Canada) CAN	Clément Bayiha	30	2	19+9	2	1+1	0
16	MF	(Canada) CAN	Max Ferrari	29	0	21+6	0	2+0	0
21	MF	(Canada) CAN	Michael Petrasso	14	0	1+13	0	0+0	0
27	MF	(Canada) CAN	Carson Buschman-Dormond	6	0	0+6	0	0+0	0
28	MF	(Canada) CAN	Jérémy Gagnon-Laparé	23	0	15+7	0	1+0	0
33	MF	(Philippines) PHI	Matthew Baldisimo	18	1	9+7	1	1+1	0
37	MF	(Canada) CAN	Trivine Esprit	11	0	3+8	0	0+0	0
44	MF	(Ukraine) UKR	Markiyan Voytsekhovskyy	8	1	2+5	1	0+1	0
Forwards
9	FW	(Canada) CAN	Brian Wright	29	2	15+12	2	0+2	0
14	FW	(Canada) CAN	Theo Afework	0	0	0+0	0	0+0	0
18	FW	(Syria) SYR	Molham Babouli	21	7	19+1	6	1+0	1
22	FW	(Canada) CAN	Austin Ricci	28	4	18+8	3	0+2	1
24	FW	(Guyana) GUY	Osaze De Rosario	27	6	14+11	6	2+0	0

=== Top scorers ===
Rank	Nat.	Player	Pos.	Canadian Premier League	Canadian Championship	TOTAL
1	(Syria)	Molham Babouli	FW	6	1	7
2	(Guyana)	Osaze De Rosario	FW	6	0	6
2	(Portugal)	Kevin Dos Santos	MF	6	0	6
3	(Canada)	Austin Ricci	FW	3	1	4
4	(Netherlands)	Oussama Alou	MF	2	0	2
4	(Canada)	Clément Bayiha	MF	2	0	2
4	(Liberia)	Brem Soumaoro	DF	2	0	2
4	(Canada)	Brian Wright	FW	2	0	2
5	(Philippines)	Matthew Baldisimo	MF	1	0	1
5	(Canada)	Roger Thompson	DF	1	0	1
5	(Ukraine)	Markiyan Voytsekhovskyy	MF	1	0	1
Totals				32	2	34

Updated to match played October 12, 2023
Source: Canadian Premier League

=== Top assists ===
Rank	Nat.	Player	Pos.	Canadian Premier League	Canadian Championship	TOTAL
1	(Canada)	Jérémy Gagnon-Laparé	MF	5	0	5
2	(Netherlands)	Oussama Alou	MF	2	0	2
2	(Syria)	Molham Babouli	FW	2	0	2
2	(Canada)	Clément Bayiha	MF	2	0	2
2	(Guyana)	Osaze De Rosario	FW	2	0	2
2	(Canada)	Kadin Martin-Pereux	DF	2	0	2
2	(Canada)	Austin Ricci	FW	2	0	2
2	(Canada)	Brian Wright	FW	2	0	2
3	(Canada)	Paris Gee	DF	1	0	1
3	(Canada)	Jonathan Grant	DF	1	0	1
3	(Netherlands)	Lassana Faye	DF	0	1	1
3	(Australia)	Tass Mourdoukoutas	DF	1	0	1
3	(Liberia)	Brem Soumaoro	DF	1	0	1
Totals				23	1	24

Updated to match played October 12, 2023
Source: Canadian Premier League

=== Clean sheets ===
Rank	Nat.	Player	Canadian Premier League	Canadian Championship	TOTAL
1	(Canada)	Niko Giantsopoulos	5	1	6
Totals			5	1	6

Updated to match played October 12, 2023
Source: Canadian Premier League

=== Disciplinary record ===
No.	Pos.	Nat.	Player	Canadian Premier League		Canadian Championship		TOTAL	
No.	Pos.	Nat.	Player	Yellow card	Red card	Yellow card	Red card	Yellow card	Red card
1	GK	(Canada)	Niko Giantsopoulos	3	0	1	0	4	0
2	DF	(Canada)	Paris Gee	6	0	1	0	7	0
3	DF	(Australia)	Tass Mourdoukoutas	1	0	0	0	1	0
6	DF	(Canada)	Roger Thompson	2	0	0	0	2	0
7	DF	(Canada)	Jonathan Grant	1	0	0	0	1	0
8	MF	(Canada)	Elijah Adekugbe	3	0	0	0	3	0
9	FW	(Canada)	Brian Wright	1	0	0	0	1	0
10	MF	(Netherlands)	Oussama Alou	2	0	0	0	2	0
11	MF	(Portugal)	Kevin dos Santos	4	0	0	0	4	0
16	MF	(Canada)	Max Ferrari	5	0	0	0	5	0
18	FW	(Syria)	Molham Babouli	8	2	1	0	9	2
22	FW	(Canada)	Austin Ricci	9	1	1	0	10	1
23	DF	(Canada)	Noah Abatneh	1	1	0	0	1	1
24	FW	(Guyana)	Osaze De Rosario	2	0	0	0	2	0
27	MF	(Canada)	Carson Buschman-Dormond	0	1	0	0	0	1
28	MF	(Canada)	Jérémy Gagnon-Laparé	7	0	0	0	7	0
30	DF	(Canada)	Kadin Martin-Pereux	1	0	0	0	1	0
32	MF	(Liberia)	Brem Soumaoro	6	0	0	0	6	0
33	MF	(Philippines)	Matthew Baldisimo	4	1	0	0	4	1
37	MF	(Canada)	Trivine Esprit	1	0	0	0	1	0
43	DF	(Netherlands)	Lassana Faye	4	0	0	0	4	0
77	GK	(United States)	Adisa De Rosario	1	0	0	0	1	0
Totals				72	6	4	0	76	6

Updated to match played October 12, 2023
Source: Canadian Premier League
