= Julio Rodríguez Martínez =

Julio Rodríguez Martínez may refer to:

- Julio Rodríguez (footballer, born 1984)
- Julio Rodríguez Martínez (politician)
