= Daniel Torres =

Daniel Torres may refer to:

- Daniel Díaz Torres (1948–2013), Cuban film director and screenwriter
- Daniel Torres (cartoonist) (born 1958), Spanish comics artist and writer
- Daniel Fernández Torres (born 1964), bishop for the Roman Catholic Diocese of Arecibo
- Daniel Torres García (born 1968), Mexican politician
- Daniel Torres (Costa Rican footballer) (born 1977), Costa Rican football defender
- Dani Torres (Spanish footballer) (born 1984), Spanish football centre-back
- Dani Torres (Colombian footballer) (born 1989), Colombian football defensive midfielder
- Daniel Torres Samaniego (born 1991), Mexican swimmer
- Danny Torres (born 1987), Salvadoran footballer
