= Óscar Quesada =

Spanish footballer

Personal information
- Full name: Óscar Quesada Martínez
- Date of birth: 19 January 1978 (age 48)
- Place of birth: Úbeda, Spain
- Height: 1.82 m (6 ft 0 in)
- Position: Midfielder

Senior career*
| Years | Team | Apps | (Gls) |
| 1993–1995 | Orcera | | |
| 1995–1999 | Puente Génave | | |
| 1999–2002 | Úbeda | | |
| 2002–2004 | Mancha Real | | |
| 2004–2005 | Torredonjimeno | | |
| 2005–2006 | Manchego | | |
| 2006–2012 | Alcalá | 209 | (21) |
| 2012–2017 | Jaén | 166 | (15) |
| 2017–2024 | Mancha Real | 165 | (7) |
- * Club domestic league appearances and goals

Óscar Quesada Martínez (born 19 January 1978) is a Spanish former footballer who played as a central midfielder.

== Club career ==
Born in Úbeda, Andalusia, Quesada made his senior debut with Orcera CF in 1993. He first arrived in the Tercera División in the 1999–2000 season, signing with Úbeda CF.

Quesada continued playing in the fourth tier the following years, representing Atlético Mancha Real, Torredonjimeno CF, CD Manchego and RSD Alcalá. With the latter, he achieved promotion to Segunda División B at the end of the 2008–09 campaign.

In July 2012, Quesada joined Real Jaén. He helped his local club promote to the Segunda División at the first attempt, contributing three goals in 34 appearances.

On 8 September 2013, at already 35, Quesada appeared in his first-ever match as a professional, starting and scoring the first goal in a 3–1 home win against Girona FC. After leaving the Nuevo Estadio de La Victoria in summer 2017 he returned to Atlético Mancha Real, playing well into his 40s at amateur level.
