= RSD Alcalá =

Alcalá
- Full name: Real Sociedad Deportiva Alcalá
- Nickname: Rojilos
- Founded: 1 May 1929; 97 years ago as (Sociedad) Alcalá Foot-ball Club
- Stadium: Estadio Municipal del Val
- Capacity: 5,500
- Owner: Carlos Martín
- President: José Antonio Pareja
- Head coach: Vivar Dorado
- 2025–26: Segunda Federación – Group 5, 6th of 18
- Website: rsdalcala.com
Home colours	Away colours

Real Sociedad Deportiva Alcalá is a Spanish football team based in Alcalá de Henares in the Community of Madrid. Founded in 1929 it plays in Segunda Federación – Group 5, holding home matches at Estadio Municipal del Val, with a capacity of 8,000.

== History ==
Alcalá de Henares, being a city of students, has a long football history. With the influence of the capital proximity where football was played long before, in 1908 appeared Alcalá Foot-Ball Club. During World War I, the town housed a large number of German boarding schools that fostered the development of local youth, and two short-lived clubs were founded shortly after: in 1920, the Unión Deportiva Alcalaína and in 1922, the Sociedad Gimnástica Alcalaína. On October 1, 1924, the Piarist Eusebio Gómez de Miguel, a mathematics teacher at the school located in the former university, founded a new club, the Alcalá Football Club, which had nothing to do with the previous one. It began playing in the Artesian Well Era, in what is now known as the Antezana neighborhood.

At the same time, Ángel Gómez Alcalá founded the Deportivo Obrera Alcalaína, using part of the equipment of Alcalá F.C., playing on the latter's field until the merger of the two clubs on May 1, 1929, to form the Sociedad Deportiva Alcalá, as it has survived to this day. On December 20 of that same year, 1929, the club was granted the title of Real. The president of the Sociedad Deportiva Alcalá, Fernando Presas, requested the Royal Household to grant it this honor,[1] and from then on, it has been known as Real Sociedad Deportiva Alcalá.

As a curious fact, it is worth noting that Alcalá has two honorary presidents: HRH King Felipe VI and Rodolfo Gómez de Vargas.

In terms of sport, Real Sociedad Deportiva Alcalá began competing in the Regional Championship organized by the Castilian Regional Football Federation after becoming a federation on August 26, 1933. It did not excel much, losing its status as a Real during the Spanish Republic, during which time it operated under the name Sociedad Deportiva Alcalá, as it had originally. It was after the end of the Civil War that it regained its Real title and changed to Real Sociedad Deportiva Alcalá, beginning to gain prominence by being invited to the Third Division championship in the 1940/41 season, where it finished runner-up. In the following two seasons, it remained in the First Regional Championship, winning the championship in 1941/42 and finishing runner-up in 1942/43, which allowed it to return to the Third Division.

In the 1943/44 season, the club finished sixth in Group VI of the Third Division, returning to compete in the First Regional Division for the following seasons in a category that was still undefined and very expensive to maintain. In the 1949/50 and 1950/51 seasons, it returned to the Third Division, finishing thirteenth in the first and fifteenth, including relegation, in the second. During the 1950s, the club had several sports divisions, including basketball, boxing, and cycling, which would later be phased out. As for football, it remained in the First Regional Division for the entire decade until, at the end of the 1959/60 season, it was crowned champion and promoted to the Third Division.

The club spent the entire 1960s in the Third Division, with its first few years in the Castilian-Extremaduran division, where it consistently occupied midfield positions. It then moved to the Castilian division, where it finished third in the 1966/67 season and fifth in the 1967/68 season. On June 28, 1966, the board decided to sell the old Val sports field, at which point the oldest summer tournament in the region, the Cervantes Trophy, began. Shortly after, they purchased land for 9,800 pesetas on August 29, 1967. In the 1968/69 season, the Third Division underwent changes due to a restructuring of the league. The club finished eighth in the 1968/69 season and fourteenth in the 1969/70 season. This position meant it could not make the cutoff established by the RFEF (Regional Football Federation), and it was relegated to the First Regional Division.

They played in the Regional League for seven seasons, in the First Division from the 1970/71 season to the 1972/73 season, and in the Preferente League since its creation in the 1973/74 season. On August 14, 1973, the new Estadio Municipal El Val, also known as Virgen del Val and located within the Ciudad Deportiva of the same name, was finally inaugurated with a match between RSD Alcalá and UD Salamanca, with a final score of 1-1, the first match played in the Cervantes Trophy. In the 1976/77 season, they finished runners-up to CD Leganés and were promoted to the Third Division. They spent the final stretch of the 1970s in the Third Division within a group made up of Castilians, Aragonese, and Canarian teams, enjoying strong finishes, including first place in the 1979/80 season, which saw them reach the Second Division B for the first time in their history.

The eighties began in Group I of Second B, the northern zone, finishing fourteenth in the 80/81 season and eighth in the 81

== Infrastructure ==
The Estadio Municipal del Val, or simply El Val, is the football stadium where Real Sociedad Deportiva Alcalá plays its matches. It is located in the Val neighborhood of Alcalá de Henares, next to the El Val sports complex and the right bank of the Henares River.

It was inaugurated on August 14, 1973, for the Cervantes Trophy between RSD Alcalá and UD Salamanca. It has a capacity for approximately 7,500 spectators, and the playing field measures 108 x 70 m, making it the largest football field in Spain according to the Royal Spanish Football Federation yearbook. The main seating area is made of cement, while the grandstand seats are white and red in honor of the club's colors, and the pitch is made of natural grass.

From 1929 to 1973, Alcalá played its matches at Campo El Humilladero, which was donated by Father Eusebio and inaugurated in 1929. It was located on Paseo del Val Street, now the Boisan shopping center, just a few meters from the current stadium.

The land was owned by the R.S.D. Alcalá, which ceded it to the City Council due to insufficient funds to complete the project. The City Council provided the stadium with facilities and lighting for night matches in 2002.

== Season to season ==
Season	Tier	Division	Place	Copa del Rey
1939–40	4	1ª Reg. B	2nd	
1940–41	3	3ª	2nd	
1941–42	3	1ª Reg.	1st	
1942–43	3	1ª Reg.	2nd	
1943–44	3	3ª	6th	Third round
1944–45	4	1ª Reg.	1st	
1945–46	4	1ª Reg.	7th	
1946–47	4	1ª Reg.	11th	
1947–48	4	1ª Reg.	16th	
1948–49	4	1ª Reg.	1st	
1949–50	3	3ª	13th	
1950–51	3	3ª	15th	
1951–52	4	1ª Reg.	1st	
1952–53	4	1ª Reg.	2nd	
1953–54	4	1ª Reg.	2nd	
1954–55	4	1ª Reg.	3rd	
1955–56	4	1ª Reg.	2nd	
1956–57	4	1ª Reg.	5th	
1957–58	4	1ª Reg.	4th	
1958–59	4	1ª Reg.	4th	

Season	Tier	Division	Place	Copa del Rey
1959–60	4	1ª Reg.	1st	
1960–61	3	3ª	10th	
1961–62	3	3ª	10th	
1962–63	3	3ª	8th	
1963–64	3	3ª	12th	
1964–65	3	3ª	14th	
1965–66	3	3ª	7th	
1966–67	3	3ª	3rd	
1967–68	3	3ª	5th	
1968–69	3	3ª	10th	
1969–70	3	3ª	11th	First round
1970–71	4	1ª Reg.	11th	
1971–72	4	1ª Reg.	3rd	
1972–73	4	1ª Reg.	5th	
1973–74	4	1ª Reg.	3rd	
1974–75	4	Ref. Pref.	10th	
1975–76	4	Ref. Pref.	9th	
1976–77	4	Ref. Pref.	2nd	
1977–78	4	3ª	4th	Second round
1978–79	4	3ª	6th	

Season	Tier	Division	Place	Copa del Rey
1979–80	4	3ª	1st	First round
1980–81	3	2ª B	14th	First round
1981–82	3	2ª B	8th	
1982–83	3	2ª B	16th	Third round
1983–84	3	2ª B	7th	
1984–85	3	2ª B	16th	First round
1985–86	3	2ª B	17th	
1986–87	4	3ª	4th	
1987–88	3	2ª B	9th	
1988–89	3	2ª B	7th	Third round
1989–90	3	2ª B	15th	
1990–91	3	2ª B	20th	Fourth round
1991–92	4	3ª	4th	First round
1992–93	3	2ª B	20th	
1993–94	4	3ª	20th	
1994–95	5	Ref. Pref.	1st	
1995–96	4	3ª	10th	
1996–97	4	3ª	3rd	
1997–98	4	3ª	5th	
1998–99	4	3ª	10th	

Season	Tier	Division	Place	Copa del Rey
1999–2000	4	3ª	4th	
2000–01	4	3ª	5th	
2001–02	3	2ª B	11th	
2002–03	3	2ª B	10th	
2003–04	3	2ª B	16th	
2004–05	3	2ª B	4th	
2005–06	3	2ª B	17th	Second round
2006–07	4	3ª	1st	
2007–08	4	3ª	3rd	First round
2008–09	4	3ª	1st	
2009–10	3	2ª B	13th	First round
2010–11	3	2ª B	8th	
2011–12	3	2ª B	15th	Second round
2012–13	3	2ª B	18th	
2013–14	4	3ª	9th	
2014–15	4	3ª	8th	
2015–16	4	3ª	8th	
2016–17	4	3ª	8th	
2017–18	4	3ª	4th	
2018–19	4	3ª	9th	

Season	Tier	Division	Place	Copa del Rey
2019–20	4	3ª	4th	
2020–21	4	3ª	8th / 1st	
2021–22	5	3ª RFEF	7th	
2022–23	5	3ª Fed.	6th	
2023–24	5	3ª Fed.	6th	
2024–25	5	3ª Fed.	1st	
2025–26	4	2ª Fed.	6th	First round
2026–27	4	2ª Fed.		First round

- 20 seasons in Segunda División B
- 2 season in Segunda Federación
- 37 seasons in Tercera División
- 4 seasons in Tercera Federación/Tercera División RFEF

== Players ==
All-time top scorers			Most games played
1.	Ángel Heredero	107 goals	1.	José Luis Sánchez, Joselu	473 matches
2.	Antonio Brotóns	91 goals	2.	Juan Lechón, "Juancho"	420 matches
3.	Julián Montero	69 goals	3.	Ricardo Rodríguez Flores	368 matches
4.	Roberto Izquierdo	62 goals	4.	Roberto Izquierdo	294 matches
5.	Miguel Ramos	61 goals	5.	Juan Ignacio Viñas, Juani	233 matches

Nota: En negrita los jugadores aún activos en el club.

Coach

Preliminary Considerations: The coaches for the 1945-48 and 1954-55 seasons are unknown (although Carlos Sánchez may have continued in several matches). The coach for the 1950-51 season is considered to be Alfonso Pérez Prades, as then-president Mariano Benedicto referred to in an interview with the newspaper Pueblo. Carlos Sánchez may have replaced Miguel Manchado in the 1956-57 season after the latter's dismissal, and also in the 1957-58 season. Perhaps in these last two cases, Carlos Sánchez was also in charge of the team. In the 1959-60 season, after reading the Nuevo Alcalá numbers, it is unclear how many matches Carlos Sánchez managed, and how many José Mª Murcia managed, before José Mª Sánchez Ballesteros returned to the bench.

More matches directed
Pos.	Coach	matches	season
1.	Carlos Sánchez Segovia	268	11
2.	Jorge Martín de San Pablo	197	6*
3.	José Antonio Segura	194	6
4.	Josip Višnjić	144	4

== Notable former players ==
The following players have played at least 100 league games for the club:

- (Spain) Julio
- (Spain) Óscar Quesada
- (Spain) Dani Torres

== See also ==
- RSD Alcalá B, reserve team
