= Osaze De Rosario =

Guyanese footballer (born 2001)

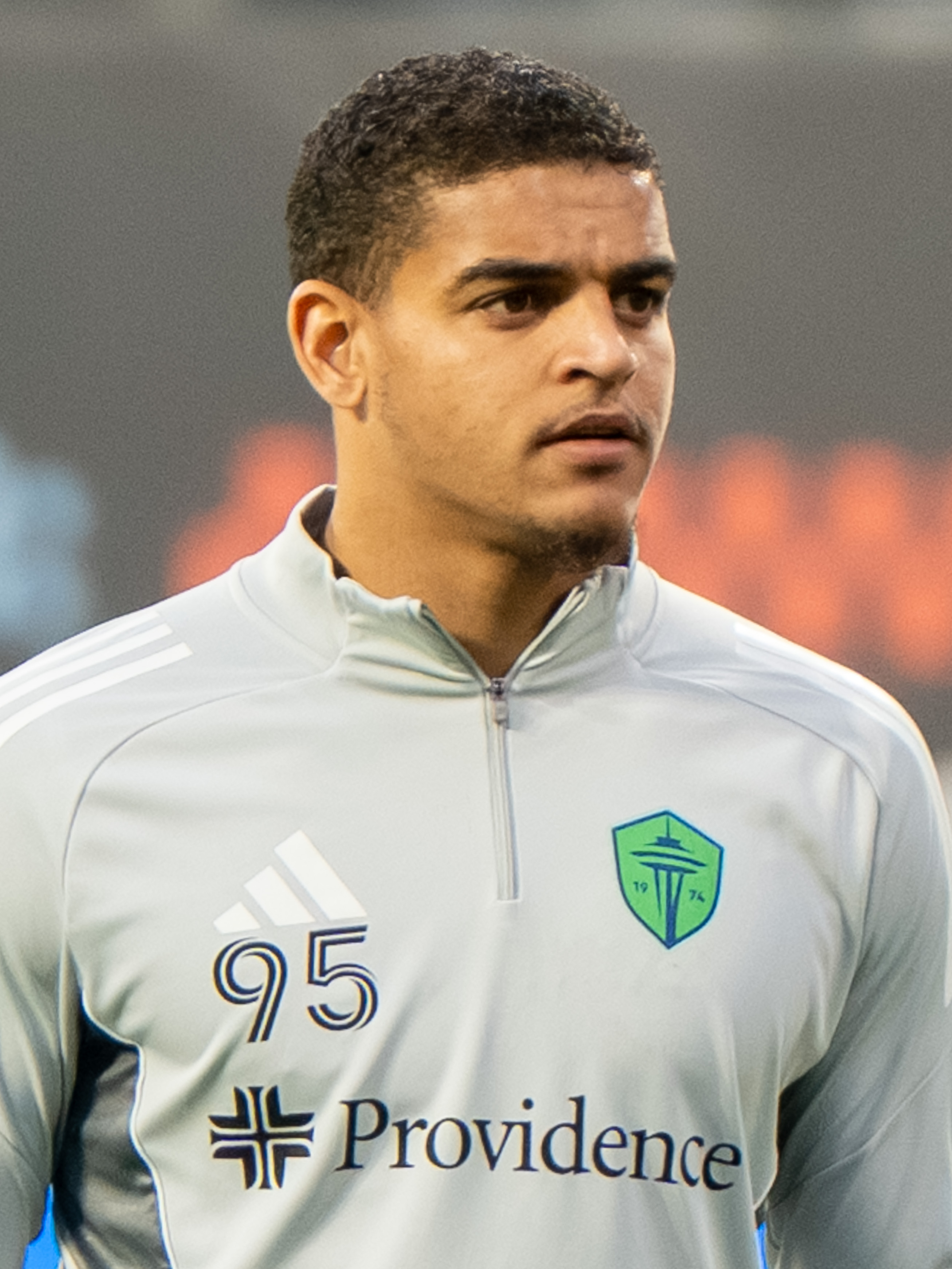
- De Rosario with Seattle Sounders FC in 2025

Personal information
- Full name: Osaze Tafari De Rosario
- Date of birth: 19 July 2001 (age 25)
- Place of birth: San Jose, California, United States
- Height: 1.87 m (6 ft 2 in)
- Position: Striker

Team information
- Current team: Sønderjyske (on loan from Seattle Sounders FC)
- Number: 24

Youth career
- Erin Mills Eagles
- –2019: Toronto FC

Senior career*
Years	Team	Apps	(Gls)
2018	Toronto FC III	3	(0)
2019–2020	New York City FC	0	(0)
2021–2022	Rukh Lviv	2	(0)
2022–2023	York United	51	(18)
2024–2025	Tacoma Defiance	27	(14)
2024–2025	→ Seattle Sounders FC (loan)	1	(0)
2025–	Seattle Sounders FC	29	(3)
2025–2026	→ Tacoma Defiance (loan)	8	(3)
2026–	→ Sønderjyske (loan)	3	(2)

International career^{‡}
2023–	Guyana	18	(18)
- * Club domestic league appearances and goals as of 14:08, 28 September 2026 (UTC) ‡ National team caps and goals as of 20:54, 16 November 2026 (UTC)

Osaze Tafari De Rosario (/oʊˈsɑːzeɪ/ oh-SAH-zay; born 19 July 2001) is a professional footballer who plays as a striker for Danish Superliga club Sønderjyske, on loan from Major League Soccer club Seattle Sounders FC. Born in the United States, he plays for the Guyana national team.

He is the son of former Canada national team player Dwayne De Rosario.

== Early life ==
De Rosario was born in San Jose, California, where his father, Canada national team player Dwayne De Rosario, was playing for the San Jose Earthquakes.

De Rosario is a product of the Toronto FC and New York City FC academies.

== Club career ==
In 2018, De Rosario played with Toronto FC III in the Canadian third-tier League1 Ontario, making his debut on August 19 against Ottawa South United.

He spent the 2020 preseason with the New York City FC first-team, appearing in four matches, scoring twice, including a goal against Brazilian club Palmeiras. He departed NYCFC after 2020, and in early 2021 went on trial with Spanish clubs SS Reyes and Lugo.

In September 2021, after a successful trial, De Rosario signed a three-year contract with Ukrainian Premier League club Rukh Lviv, and was assigned to the reserves. He made his professional debut for Rukh in the UPL as a starter against Mynai the next month on October 24. In February 2022, he left the club by mutual consent, nine days before the 2022 Russian invasion of Ukraine after United States President Joe Biden urged all American citizens to leave Ukraine.

After leaving Ukraine, De Rosario joined Canadian Premier League club York United on trial during their pre-season in March 2022. The next month on April 6, York announced they had signed De Rosario to a one-year contract, with options for 2023 and 2024. He made his debut in York's season opener against the HFX Wanderers on April 7. In De Rosario's next match on April 15 against FC Edmonton, he started his first match, in which he scored his first goal. On August 2, he was named Player of the Week for the first time for Week 17. In September, he became the club's all-time leading scorer, when he scored his 12th goal. At the end of the season, he was nominated for the CPL U21 Player of the Year Award, which was ultimately won by Sean Rea. In November 2022, he signed a two-year extension with the club. In August 2023, De Rosario was disqualified from official competitions for one month by the Canadian Centre for Ethics in Sport, after he had tested positive for THC in an in-competition urine test; in an official statement, the player confirmed he would abide by the sanction, while stating his ingestion of THC was accidental. On October 7, he scored a brace in a 2–1 league victory over Vancouver FC, which allowed York United to qualify for the play-offs. At the time of his departure from the club after the 2023, he was the club's all-time leading goalscorer with 19 goals.

In March 2024, he moved to the Tacoma Defiance in MLS Next Pro. He scored his first goal on March 31 against LA Galaxy II. On May 9, 2024, he joined the Seattle Sounders FC first team on a short-term loan, making his debut in a 2024 US Open Cup match against Louisville City FC. He signed another short-term loan later that month as well. He earned MLS Next Pro Player of the Month honours for April 2025. On May 3, 2025, after signing another short-term loan, he made his Major League Soccer debut for the Sounders against St. Louis City SC. On 8 May 2025, Rosario signed a first team contract with the Sounders, joining for the remainder of the 2025 MLS season, with club options for an additional two years.

On 1 September 2026, De Rosario joined Danish Superliga side Sønderjyske on a one-year loan deal.

== International career ==
De Rosario was eligible to represent the United States (his country of birth), Canada (through his parents) and Guyana (through his paternal grandparents).

In November 2023, De Rosario accepted a call-up to the Guyana senior national team ahead of their CONCACAF Nations League B matches against the Bahamas and Antigua and Barbuda. He made his debut and scored his first international goal for the Golden Jaguars on November 21, in a 6–0 win over Antigua and Barbuda. In November 2024, he participated in a training camp with the Canada senior team as his father was serving as an assistant, before then re-joining the Guyana team for their CONCACAF Nations League matches. On November 19, he scored a hat trick for Guyana in a 5–3 victory over Barbados in the CONCACAF Nations League.

== Personal life ==
He is a son of former Canada national team player Dwayne De Rosario and the brother of Adisa De Rosario. His name is of Nigerian origin and means "God chooses (for you)".

== Career statistics ==
=== Club ===
As of September 2, 2025

Appearances and goals by club, season and competition
Club	Season	League			Playoffs		National cup		Other		Total	
Club	Season	Division	Apps	Goals	Apps	Goals	Apps	Goals	Apps	Goals	Apps	Goals
Toronto FC III	2018	League1 Ontario	3	0	–		–		0	0	3	0
Rukh Lviv	2021–22	Ukrainian Premier League	2	0	–		0	0	–		2	0
York United	2022	Canadian Premier League	27	12	–		3	1	–		30	13
York United	2023	Canadian Premier League	24	6	1	0	2	0	–		27	6
York United	Total		51	18	1	0	5	1	0	0	57	19
Tacoma Defiance	2024	MLS Next Pro	22	6	1	0	–		–		23	6
Tacoma Defiance	2025	MLS Next Pro	5	8	0	0	3	2	–		8	10
Tacoma Defiance	Total		27	14	1	0	3	2	0	0	31	16
Seattle Sounders FC (loan)	2024	Major League Soccer	0	0	–		1	0	0	0	1	0
Seattle Sounders FC (loan)	2025	Major League Soccer	1	0	0	0	–		0	0	1	0
Seattle Sounders FC	2025	Major League Soccer	8	1	0	0	–		7 (Note: Six appearances in Leagues Cup, one appearance in the FIFA Club World Cup)	4	15	5
Seattle Sounders FC	Total		9	1	0	0	1	0	7	4	17	5
Career total			92	33	2	0	9	3	7	4	110	40

=== International ===
As of match played 15 November 2026

Appearances and goals by national team and year
National team	Year	Apps	Goals
Guyana	2023	1	1
Guyana	2024	6	4
Guyana	2025	4	3
Guyana	2026	7	10
Total		18	18

Scores and results list Guyana's goal tally first, score column indicates score after each De Rosario goal.

List of international goals scored by Osaze De Rosario
No.	Date	Venue	Opponent	Score	Result	Competition
1	21 November 2023	Estadio Olímpico Félix Sánchez, Santo Domingo, Dominican Republic	Antigua and Barbuda	4–0	6–0	2023–24 CONCACAF Nations League B
2	15 November 2024	Wildey Turf, Bridgetown, Barbados	Barbados	3–1	4–1	2024–25 CONCACAF Nations League Play-in
3	19 November 2024	Synthetic Track and Field Facility, Leonara, Guyana	Barbados	1–0	5–3	2024–25 CONCACAF Nations League Play-in
4	19 November 2024	Synthetic Track and Field Facility, Leonara, Guyana	Barbados	2–0	5–3	2024–25 CONCACAF Nations League Play-in
5	19 November 2024	Synthetic Track and Field Facility, Leonara, Guyana	Barbados	3–0	5–3	2024–25 CONCACAF Nations League Play-in
6	10 June 2025	Synthetic Track and Field Facility, Leonora, Guyana	Montserrat	2–0	3–0	2026 FIFA World Cup qualification
7	15 November 2025	Sir Vivian Richards Stadium, North Sound, Antigua and Barbuda	Bonaire	2–1	2–1	2025–26 CONCACAF Series
8	18 November 2025	Sir Vivian Richards Stadium, North Sound, Antigua and Barbuda	Antigua and Barbuda	3–1	4–1	2025–26 CONCACAF Series
9	27 March 2026	Estadio Cibao FC, Santiago de los Caballeros, Dominican Republic	Dominica	1–0	2–0	2025–26 CONCACAF Series
10	27 March 2026	Estadio Cibao FC, Santiago de los Caballeros, Dominican Republic	Dominica	2–0	2–0	2025–26 CONCACAF Series
11	30 March 2026	Estadio Cibao FC, Santiago de los Caballeros, Dominican Republic	Belize	1–0	3–1	2025–26 CONCACAF Series
12	30 March 2026	Estadio Cibao FC, Santiago de los Caballeros, Dominican Republic	Belize	2–1	3–1	2025–26 CONCACAF Series
13	30 March 2026	Estadio Cibao FC, Santiago de los Caballeros, Dominican Republic	Belize	3–1	3–1	2025–26 CONCACAF Series
14	24 September 2026	Windsor Park, Roseau, Dominica	Puerto Rico	1–0	1–0	2026–27 CONCACAF Nations League B
15	27 September 2026	Windsor Park, Roseau, Dominica	Cayman Islands	2–0	2–0	2026–27 CONCACAF Nations League B
16	1 October 2026	Mayagüez Athletics Stadium, Mayagüez, Puerto Rico	Dominica	2–0	5–1	2026–27 CONCACAF Nations League B
17	12 November 2026	Synthetic Track and Field Facility, Leonora, Guyana	Cayman Islands	3–0	6–0	2026–27 CONCACAF Nations League B
18	16 November 2026	Synthetic Track and Field Facility, Leonora, Guyana	Puerto Rico	2–1	4–2	2026–27 CONCACAF Nations League B

== Honours ==
Seattle Sounders FC

- Leagues Cup: 2025
