= Kadin Martin-Pereux =

Canadian soccer player (born 2002)

Personal information
- Date of birth: October 9, 2002 (age 24)
- Place of birth: Victoria, British Columbia, Canada
- Height: 1.83 m (6 ft 0 in)
- Position: Midfielder

Youth career
- Victoria Highlanders FC

Senior career*
| Years | Team | Apps | (Gls) |
| 2022–2023 | SC Paderborn 07 II | 30 | (7) |
| 2023–2024 | York United FC | 19 | (0) |
- * Club domestic league appearances and goals as of August 2, 2024

Kadin Martin-Pereux (born October 9, 2002) is a Canadian soccer player who plays as a midfielder.

== Early life ==
Martin-Pereux played youth soccer with Victoria Highlanders FC. In 2019, he played at the senior amateur level with Westcastle United.

== Career ==
In January 2022, he signed with German club SC Paderborn II in the fifth tier Oberliga Westfalen. On September 23, 2022, he scored his first goal for the team in a 3–1 victory over Delbrücker SC. On March 26, 2023, he scored a hat trick against Delbrücker SC in a 3–0 victory.

In September 2023, he signed with York United FC of the Canadian Premier League for the remainder of the 2023 season, with an option for the 2024 season. On August 2, 2024, he suffered a season-ending ACL injury.

== Career statistics ==
As of August 2, 2024

Appearances and goals by club, season and competition
| Club | Season | League | | | Playoffs | | National cup | | Continental | | Total | |
| Club | Season | Division | Apps | Goals | Apps | Goals | Apps | Goals | Apps | Goals | Apps | Goals |
|---|---|---|---|---|---|---|---|---|---|---|---|---|
| SC Paderborn 07 II | 2021–22 | Oberliga Westfalen | 1 | 0 | – | | – | | – | | 1 | 0 |
| SC Paderborn 07 II | 2022–23 | Oberliga Westfalen | 29 | 7 | – | | – | | – | | 29 | 7 |
| SC Paderborn 07 II | Total | | 30 | 7 | 0 | 0 | 0 | 0 | 0 | 0 | 30 | 7 |
| York United FC | 2023 | Canadian Premier League | 5 | 0 | 1 | 0 | 0 | 0 | – | | 6 | 0 |
| York United FC | 2024 | Canadian Premier League | 14 | 0 | 0 | 0 | 0 | 0 | – | | 14 | 0 |
| York United FC | Total | | 19 | 0 | 1 | 0 | 0 | 0 | 0 | 0 | 20 | 0 |
| Career total | | | 49 | 7 | 1 | 0 | 0 | 0 | 0 | 0 | 50 | 7 |
