= Lassana Faye =

Dutch footballer (born 1998)

Personal information
- Date of birth: 15 June 1998 (age 28)
- Place of birth: Rotterdam, Netherlands
- Height: 1.70 m (5 ft 7 in)
- Position: Left-back

Youth career
- 2008–2009: Spartaan '20
- 2009–2012: Sparta Rotterdam
- 2012–2015: PSV
- 2015–2017: Vitesse

Senior career*
Years	Team	Apps	(Gls)
2016–2019	Jong Vitesse	43	(0)
2016–2019	Vitesse	21	(0)
2019	Jong Sparta	1	(0)
2019–2021	Sparta	35	(0)
2020–2021	→ ADO Den Haag (loan)	12	(0)
2022	Rukh Lviv	0	(0)
2023	York United	12	(0)
2023	Telstar	6	(0)
2024	Liepāja	7	(0)
2024–2025	Al-Zawraa	9	(0)
2025	HB Tórshavn	24	(1)
2026	Manchego Ciudad Real	14	(0)

International career^{‡}
2014	Netherlands U16	3	(0)
2015	Netherlands U17	1	(0)
- * Club domestic league appearances and goals as of 26 October 2025 ‡ National team caps and goals as of 15 February 2015

Lassana Faye (born 15 June 1998) is a Dutch professional footballer who most recently played as a left-back for Manchego Ciudad Real.

== Early life ==
Faye was born in Rotterdam, Netherlands. He began playing youth football with Spartaan '20, after which he joined the youth system of Sparta Rotterdam. At age 13, he joined PSV Eindhoven youth teams, before moving to the youth system of Vitesse in December 2015.

== Club career ==
He made his senior debut with Jong Vitesse on 13 August 2016 in the third tier Tweede Divisie FC Lienden. He made his first team debut with Vitesse on 14 December 2016 in a KNVB Cup match against CVV de Jodan Boys. He won the 2016–17 KNVB Cup with the club. After declining to sign a new contract in the summer of 2018, Vitesse picked up an option on his contract for another season, but demoted him back to the second team, with the team seeking to find a transfer for him.

On 30 January 2019, he joined Sparta Rotterdam of the Eerste Divisie, helping them earn promotion to the Eredivisie for the following season. In April 2020, he extended his contract with the club for another season.

In September 2020, he went on loan to fellow Eredivisie club ADO Den Haag.

In February 2022, he signed with Ukrainian Premier League club Rukh Lviv. However, he was unable to appear for the club as the season was cancelled due to the 2022 Russian invasion of Ukraine, which forced him to flee the country, soon after signing.

In December 2022, he signed a one-year contract for the 2023 season with a club option for a further year with Canadian Premier League club York United. He made his debut in the season opener on April 16 against Valour FC.

On 28 June 2023, Faye joined Dutch side Telstar in the Eerste Divisie on a permanent deal, having left York United due to personal issues within his family. He departed the club in December 2023, having spent only six months there, having only made six appearances, with his final game being on 15 September.

On 18 January 2024, Faye signed with Liepāja in Latvia.

In August 2024, he signed with Al-Zawraa in the Iraq Stars League.

On 12 March 2025, Faye joined Faroese Premier League club HB Tórshavn on a contract for the remainder of the season.

== International career ==
Faye was born in the Netherlands to a Senegalese father and Cape Verdean mother.

In March 2018, he was called up to the Netherlands U20 team for a friendly against the Czech Republic U20.

In February 2018, he stated it would be a dream of his to represent Senegal internationally. He has also been approached by the Cape Verdean Football Federation about representing the Cape Verde national team. In 2017, he was approached by the Senegalese Football Federation to represent the Senegal U20 team at the 2017 FIFA U-20 World Cup, but he was forced to decline the invitation, as his club team chose to not release him.

== Career statistics ==
As of match played 15 September 2023

Club	Season	League			National cup		Continental		Other		Total	
Club	Season	Division	Apps	Goals	Apps	Goals	Apps	Goals	Apps	Goals	Apps	Goals
Jong Vitesse	2016–17	Tweede Divisie	25	0	—		—		—		25	0
Jong Vitesse	2018–19	Tweede Divisie	18	0	—		—		—		18	0
Jong Vitesse	Total		43	0	0	0	0	0	0	0	43	0
Vitesse	2016–17	Eredivisie	2	0	1	0	—		—		3	0
Vitesse	2017–18	Eredivisie	19	0	0	0	5 (Note: Appearance(s) in UEFA Europa League)	0	2 (Note: One appearance in Johan Cruyff Shield, one in Eredivisie European play-offs)	0	26	0
Vitesse	2018–19	Eredivisie	0	0	0	0	0	0	—		0	0
Vitesse	Total		21	0	1	0	5	0	2	0	29	0
Jong Sparta Rotterdam	2018–19	Tweede Divisie	1	0	—		—		—		1	0
Sparta Rotterdam	2018–19	Eerste Divisie	12	0	0	0	—		4 (Note: Appearances in the Eredivisie Promotion/relegation play-offs)	0	16	0
Sparta Rotterdam	2019–20	Eredivisie	23	0	2	0	—		—		25	0
Sparta Rotterdam	2020–21	Eredivisie	0	0	0	0	0	0	0	0	0	0
Sparta Rotterdam	Total		35	0	2	0	0	0	4	0	41	0
ADO Den Haag (loan)	2020–21	Eredivisie	12	0	0	0	—		—		12	0
Rukh Lviv	2021–22	Ukrainian Premier League	0	0	0	0	–		–		0	0
York United FC	2023	Canadian Premier League	12	0	2	0	–		–		14	0
Telstar	2023–24	Eerste Divisie	6	0	0	0	—		—		6	0
Career total			130	0	5	0	5	0	6	0	146	0

== Honours ==
Vitesse

- KNVB Cup: 2016–17
