= Mikaël Cantave =

Haitian footballer (born 1996)

Personal information
- Full name: Mikaël Gabriel Cantave
- Date of birth: 25 October 1996 (age 30)
- Place of birth: Ottawa, Ontario, Canada
- Height: 1.77 m (5 ft 10 in)
- Position: Midfielder

Team information
- Current team: Nestos Chrysoupoli
- Number: 70

Youth career
- –2012: FC Capital United
- 2012–2013: Nantes
- 2013: Orvault SF
- 2013–2014: USJA Carquefou
- 2014–2015: Getafe

Senior career*
Years	Team	Apps	(Gls)
2016	Guadalajara	3	(0)
2016	Real Alcalá B	7	(0)
2017	Albacete B	13	(0)
2017	Lorca B	16	(0)
2018	Rayo Cantabria	15	(2)
2018–2019	Tropezón	24	(3)
2019–2020	Lealtad	28	(6)
2020	Xàtiva	7	(1)
2021	Villarrobledo	17	(2)
2021–2022	Chindia Târgoviște	9	(0)
2022–2023	Cavalry FC	21	(3)
2023–2025	Vancouver FC	41	(5)
2025–2026	Makedonikos	24	(8)
2026–	Nestos Chrysoupoli	0	(0)

International career^{‡}
2013	Canada U17	4	(0)
2018–	Haiti	22	(4)
- * Club domestic league appearances and goals as of 1 July 2026 ‡ National team caps and goals as of 23 June 2025

Mikaël Gabriel "Miki" Cantave (born 25 October 1996) is a professional footballer who plays as a midfielder for Super League Greece 2 club Nestos Chrysoupoli. Born in Canada, he represents the Haiti national team.

== Early life ==
Born in Ottawa, Cantave began playing soccer at age five with FC Capital United. At age 13, he moved to France joining the FC Nantes academy, after a couple of trials over the previous two years, formed through a relationship between Capital United and Nantes. Afterwards he went to Nacional in France before joining Getafe's U19.

== Club career ==
In January 2016, he signed with Spanish club Guadalajara in the third tier Segunda División B. He made his debut on 13 March against La Roda. In August 2016, he left the club after making only three appearances for a total of 56 minutes.

Later in 2016, he joined RSD Alcalá B, followed by playing for Albacete B, Lorca FC B, and Deportivo Rayo Cantabria.

Later in 2018, he joined CD Tropezón.

In 2019, he joined CD Lealtad. He scored his first goal in a preseason friendly against Sporting de Gijón B on 31 July. He scored his first official goal on 25 August, on a penalty kick, against Lenense. He scored a brace on 12 January 2020 against Lenense.

In 2020, he joined CD Olímpic de Xàtiva. He scored his first goal on 21 November against UD Benigàmin. He departed the club at the end of 2020.

In January 2021, he joined CP Villarrobledo in the Segunda División B. He scored his first goal for Villarrobledo on 10 February against Melilla in the 94th minute to earn a 1–1 draw.

In August 2021, he joined Romanian club AFC Chindia Târgoviște in the top tier Liga I.

In July 2022, he returned to his native Canada and signed a multi-year deal with Canadian Premier League side Cavalry FC. He made his debut for Cavalry on 28 July against Forge FC. In the reverse fixture on 12 August, Cantave scored his first goal, a late winner in a 2–1 victory over the Hammers at ATCO Field.

On 29 June 2023, he joined Vancouver FC in an inter-league swap for Maël Henry. On 7 July 2023, he scored his first goal for Vancouver, netting the game-winner in a 2–1 victory over the HFX Wanderers. In January 2024, he signed an extension through the 2025 season, with a club option for 2026. After not returning to Vancouver for their pre-season in 2025 and sitting out, Cantave agreed to a mutual termination of the contract in July 2025.

In August 2025, Cantave signed with Super League Greece 2 club Makedonikos until June 2026.

On 17 August 2026, Cantave signed for Nestos Chrysoupoli on a free transfer.

== International career ==
Born in Canada, Cantave's father is from Haiti and his mother is from Guadeloupe.

Cantave played with Canada U17 at the 2013 CONCACAF U-17 Championship, where he won a bronze medal, and also at the 2013 FIFA U-17 World Cup.

In 2018, he switched allegiance to Haiti. He made his international debut on 29 May 2018, in a friendly match against Argentina. He scored his first goal on 17 November 2018, in his official competitive debut, against Nicaragua in 2019–20 CONCACAF Nations League qualifying. At the 2019 CONCACAF Gold Cup, he helped Haiti reach the semi-finals.

== Personal life ==
His father is from Haiti, while his mother is from the French overseas department of Guadeloupe.

== Career statistics ==
=== International ===
As of match played 22 June 2025

Appearances and goals by national team and year
National team	Year	Apps	Goals
Haiti	2018	3	1
Haiti	2019	7	0
Haiti	2020	0	0
Haiti	2021	2	0
Haiti	2022	0	0
Haiti	2023	2	1
Haiti	2024	6	2
Haiti	2025	2	0
Total		22	4

Haiti score listed first, score column indicates score after each Cantave goal.

International goals by date, venue, cap, opponent, score, result and competition
No.	Date	Venue	Cap	Opponent	Score	Result	Competition
1	17 November 2018	Nicaragua National Football Stadium, Managua, Nicaragua	2	Nicaragua	1–0	2–0	2019–20 CONCACAF Nations League qualifying
2	12 October 2023	Dr. Ir. Franklin Essed Stadion, Paramaribo, Suriname	13	Suriname	1–1	1–1	2023–24 CONCACAF Nations League A
3	9 September 2024	Mayagüez Athletics Stadium, Mayagüez, Puerto Rico	17	Sint Maarten	4–0	6–0	2024–25 CONCACAF Nations League B
4	9 September 2024	Mayagüez Athletics Stadium, Mayagüez, Puerto Rico	17	Sint Maarten	6–0	6–0	2024–25 CONCACAF Nations League B

== Honours ==
CD Lealtad

- Tercera División: 2019–20

Haiti

- CONCACAF Gold Cup bronze: 2019
