= Adisa De Rosario =

Canadian soccer player (born 2004)

- De Rosario with Toronto FC II in 2024

Personal information
- Full name: Adisa Ajahni-Onifade De Rosario
- Date of birth: October 27, 2004 (age 22)
- Place of birth: San Jose, California, United States
- Height: 1.85 m (6 ft 1 in)
- Position: Goalkeeper

Team information
- Current team: Toronto FC
- Number: 77

Youth career
- Vaughan Azzurri
- DeRo United FA
- 2015–2022: Toronto FC

Senior career*
Years	Team	Apps	(Gls)
2021	Toronto FC III	5	(0)
2022–2024	Toronto FC II	25	(0)
2022	→ HFX Wanderers (loan)	1	(0)
2023	→ York United (loan)	4	(0)
2025–	Toronto FC	0	(0)
2025–	→ Toronto FC II (loan)	37	(0)
- * Club domestic league appearances and goals as of September 20, 2026

Adisa Ajahni-Onifade De Rosario (born October 27, 2004) is an American professional soccer player who plays as a goalkeeper for Toronto FC in Major League Soccer.

== Early life ==
De Rosario was born in San Jose, California, while his father Dwayne De Rosario played for the San Jose Earthquakes. He played youth soccer with Vaughan Azzurri and DeRo United Futbol Academy, before joining the Toronto FC Academy in February 2015.

== Club career ==
He played with Toronto FC III in the League1 Ontario Summer Championship in 2021.

In 2022, he began the season with Toronto FC II in MLS Next Pro on an academy contract. He made his unofficial debut in a friendly on August 3 against Sunderland U23. In August 2022, he signed a short-term developmental contract with HFX Wanderers FC of the Canadian Premier League. He was then briefly recalled by Toronto FC II to re-join the team. However, shortly after he returned to the Wanderers after an injury to goalkeeper Kieran Baskett and on October 9, he made his professional debut against Forge FC.

In March 2023, he signed an official professional contract with Toronto FC II. He made his official Toronto FC II debut on May 14, 2023, against New England Revolution II. In August 2023, De Rosario was loaned to Canadian Premier League side York United until the end of the 2023 season. He made his debut on August 12 against Forge FC, playing the full match in an eventual 3–3 draw at Tim Hortons Field. In September 2023, his loan was terminated with York's Eleias Himaras returning to match fitness, with De Rosario having made four starts for the club and serving as an important contributor to helping York meet its U21 minutes requirement. Following the 2024 season, his contract expired and he departe the club.

On February 7, 2025, De Rosario signed a two-year homegrown player contract with Toronto FC in Major League Soccer, with options for 2027 and 2028. In 2025, he was loaned to the second team for some matches. He was named the MLS Next Pro Goalkeeper of the Month for June 2025. In 2025, he was selected to participate in the Goalie Wars competition at the 2025 MLS All-Star Game.

== International career ==
In April 2022, Adisa De Rosario was named to a camp for the Canada U20 for the first time.

== Personal life ==
He is the son of former Canada national team player Dwayne De Rosario and the younger brother of fellow professional soccer player Osaze De Rosario.

== Career statistics ==
As of match played September 20, 2026

Appearances and goals by club, season and competition
Club	Season	League			Playoffs		National cup		Continental		Total	
Club	Season	Division	Apps	Goals	Apps	Goals	Apps	Goals	Apps	Goals	Apps	Goals
Toronto FC III	2021	League1 Ontario Summer Championship	5	0	–		–		–		5	0
Toronto FC II	2022	MLS Next Pro	0	0	0	0	–		–		0	0
Toronto FC II	2023	MLS Next Pro	5	0	–		–		–		5	0
Toronto FC II	2024	MLS Next Pro	20	0	–		–		–		20	0
Toronto FC II	Total		25	0	0	0	0	0	0	0	25	0
HFX Wanderers (loan)	2022	Canadian Premier League	1	0	–		0	0	–		1	0
York United FC (loan)	2023	Canadian Premier League	4	0	0	0	0	0	–		4	0
Toronto FC	2025	Major League Soccer	0	0	–		0	0	–		0	0
Toronto FC II (loan)	2025	MLS Next Pro	24	0	–		–		–		24	0
Toronto FC II (loan)	2026	MLS Next Pro	13	0	–		–		–		13	0
Toronto FC II (loan)	Total		37	0	0	0	0	0	0	0	37	0
Career total			72	0	0	0	0	0	0	0	72	0
