= Trivine Esprit =

Dominica footballer (born 2002)

Personal information
- Date of birth: February 14, 2002 (age 24)
- Place of birth: Scarborough, Ontario, Canada
- Height: 5 ft 10 in (1.78 m)
- Position: Midfielder

Team information
- Current team: York United

Youth career
- North Scarborough SC
- Unionville Milliken SC

College career
Years	Team	Apps	(Gls)
2022	Ontario Tech Ridgebacks	12	(1)

Senior career*
Years	Team	Apps	(Gls)
2019–2021	Unionville Milliken SC	18	(1)
2022	Simcoe County Rovers FC	16	(0)
2023	Darby FC	7	(0)
2023	→ York United (loan)	1	(0)
2023–2024	York United	24	(0)
2025–	Simcoe County Rovers FC	15	(1)

International career^{‡}
2017	Canada U15	3	(0)
2026–	Dominica	1	(0)
- * Club domestic league appearances and goals as of August 17, 2025 ‡ National team caps and goals as of 17:39, 17 November 2026 (UTC)

Trivine Esprit (born February 14, 2002) is a footballer who plays for Simcoe County Rovers FC in League1 Ontario. Born in Canada, he plays for the Dominica national team.

== Early life ==
Esprit began playing youth soccer at age five with North Scarborough SC. He later played youth soccer with Unionville Milliken SC.

== University career ==
In 2022, Esprit began attending Ontario Tech University, where he played for the men's soccer team. In late September 2022, he was named the Ontario Tech Athlete of the Week. On October 15, 2022, he scored his first goal, scoring in the third minute in a 2–1 victory over the Carleton Ravens. At the end of the season, he was named Ontario Tech's men's soccer Rookie of the Year and was named an OUA East Second-Team All Star.

== Club career ==
In 2019 and 2021 (the 2020 season was cancelled), Esprit played with Unionville Milliken SC in League1 Ontario.

In 2022, Esprit played with the Simcoe County Rovers in League1 Ontario.

At the 2023 CPL-U Sports Draft, Esprit was selected in the second round (11th overall) by York United. After participating in pre-season with the club, he joined Darby FC in League1 Ontario. On June 9, 2023, he was signed by York as an emergency relief player, making his Canadian Premier League debut that day against Atlético Ottawa. In July 2023, he officially signed a U Sports contract with York United, allowing him to maintain his university eligibility, after training with the club since pre-season. On August 2, with his U Sports contract set to soon expire, he signed a professional contract for the remainder of the 2023 season. In April 2024, he signed another U Sports contract for the 2024 season. In August 2024, he extended his U Sports contract for the remainder of the season, rather than to return to university.

== International career ==
Born in Canada, Esprit is of Canadian descent. In February 2017, he made his debut in the Canadian national program, attending a U15 camp. He was subsequently named to the roster for the 2017 CONCACAF Boys' Under-15 Championship. In November 2026, he was called up to the Dominica national team for a set of CONCACAF Nations League matches.

== Personal life ==
Esprit's older brother Tristan played college soccer with Cornerstone University in Michigan, and his sister Trinity is plays with the University of Ottawa's women's soccer team.

== Career statistics ==
As of match played August 17, 2025

Club	Season	League			Playoffs		Domestic Cup		League Cup		Total	
Club	Season	Division	Apps	Goals	Apps	Goals	Apps	Goals	Apps	Goals	Apps	Goals
Unionville Milliken SC	2019	League1 Ontario	9	1	–		–		–		9	1
Unionville Milliken SC	2021	League1 Ontario	9	0	–		–		–		9	0
Unionville Milliken SC	Total		18	1	0	0	0	0	0	0	18	1
Simcoe County Rovers	2022	League1 Ontario	16	0	0	0	–		–		16	0
Darby FC	2023	League1 Ontario	7	0	–		–		–		7	0
York United (loan)	2023	Canadian Premier League	1	0	0	0	0	0	–		1	0
York United FC	2023	Canadian Premier League	10	0	0	0	0	0	–		10	0
York United FC	2024	Canadian Premier League	13	0	0	0	0	0	–		13	0
York United FC	Total		24	0	0	0	0	0	0	0	24	0
Simcoe County Rovers	2025	League1 Ontario Premier	15	1	–		–		3	0	18	1
Career total			80	2	0	0	0	0	3	0	83	2
