= Oussama Alou =

Dutch footballer (born 2002)

Personal information
- Date of birth: 15 January 2002 (age 24)
- Place of birth: Utrecht, Netherlands
- Height: 1.76 m (5 ft 9 in)
- Position: Midfielder

Team information
- Current team: Etar
- Number: 32

Youth career
- USV Elinkwijk
- 2013–2020: FC Utrecht

Senior career*
Years	Team	Apps	(Gls)
2020–2022	Jong FC Utrecht	37	(4)
2023	York United	16	(2)
2023–	Etar	0	(0)
- * Club domestic league appearances and goals as of 8 August 2023

Oussama Alou (born 15 January 2002) is a Dutch footballer who plays as a midfielder for Bulgarian First League club Etar Veliko Tarnovo.

== Early life ==
Alou began playing youth football with USV Elinkwijk. In 2013, he joined the youth system of FC Utrecht. He signed a professional contract with Utrecht in 2018, at the age of 16. In January 2020, he extended his contract through June 2023.

== Club career ==
He made his senior debut on 28 August 2020, for the second team, Jong FC Utrecht in the second tier Eerste Divisie, against FC Eindhoven. He scored his first professional goal on 4 January 2021 against FC Den Bosch. In August 2022, he terminated his contract with the club by mutual consent.

In January 2023, he joined Canadian Premier League club York United, signing a one-year contract, with club options for 2024 and 2025. In early August 2023, he terminated his contract with the club by mutual consent, as he wished to return home to the Netherlands.

In October 2023, Alou signed for Bulgarian First League club Etar Veliko Tarnovo on a contract until June 2025.

== International career ==
In June 2021, Alou was called up to the Morocco U20 team for a training camp.

== Career statistics ==
As of 23 July 2023

Club	Season	League			National Cup		Continental		Other		Total	
Club	Season	Division	Apps	Goals	Apps	Goals	Apps	Goals	Apps	Goals	Apps	Goals
Jong FC Utrecht	2020–21	Eerste Divisie	19	3	—		—		—		19	3
Jong FC Utrecht	2021–22	Eerste Divisie	17	1	—		—		—		17	1
Jong FC Utrecht	2022–23	Eerste Divisie	1	0	—		—		—		1	0
Jong FC Utrecht	Total		37	4	0	0	0	0	0	0	37	4
York United FC	2023	Canadian Premier League	16	2	2	0	—		0	0	18	2
Career total			53	6	2	0	0	0	0	0	55	6
