= Dani Torres (Spanish footballer) =

Spanish footballer

Personal information
- Full name: Daniel Torres Espejo
- Date of birth: 14 February 1984 (age 42)
- Place of birth: Córdoba, Spain
- Height: 1.85 m (6 ft 1 in)
- Position: Centre back

Youth career
- Séneca

Senior career*
Years	Team	Apps	(Gls)
2003–2004	Málaga B		
2004–2005	Jaén	0	(0)
2005	Córdoba B		
2005–2006	Villa del Río	18	(1)
2006–2007	Torredonjimeno	30	(1)
2007–2008	Motril	25	(2)
2008–2012	Alcalá	124	(5)
2012–2015	Jaén	50	(1)
2015–2016	Lealtad	14	(0)
2016–2019	Antequera	89	(7)
- * Club domestic league appearances and goals

Daniel Torres Espejo (born 14 February 1984) is a Spanish former footballer who played as a central defender.
