= Julio Rodríguez (footballer, born 1984) =

Spanish footballer

Personal information
- Full name: Francisco Julio Rodríguez Martínez
- Date of birth: 18 April 1984 (age 42)
- Place of birth: Madrid, Spain
- Height: 1.80 m (5 ft 11 in)
- Position: Left back

Youth career
- Leganés

Senior career*
Years	Team	Apps	(Gls)
2002–2005	Leganés B		
2004	Leganés	1	(0)
2005–2006	Marbella	8	(0)
2006–2007	Celta B	22	(1)
2007–2013	Alcalá	136	(1)
2013–2014	Guadalajara	30	(0)
2014	Socuéllamos	1	(0)
2015	Atlético Pinto	13	(0)
2015	Leiknir F.		
2016	Olímpic Xàtiva	15	(1)
2016–2017	Aravaca	5	(0)
- * Club domestic league appearances and goals

Francisco Julio Rodríguez Martínez (born 18 April 1984), sometimes known simply as Julio, is a Spanish former footballer who played as a left back.

== Club career ==
Born in Madrid, Julio graduated from local CD Leganés' youth system, making his senior debuts with the reserves. On 25 January 2004, he played his first official game with the first team, featuring the last 18 minutes in a 3-1 away win over Córdoba CF in the Segunda División.

In the following years, Julio competed in the Segunda División B and Tercera División, representing UD Marbella, Celta de Vigo B, RSD Alcalá, CD Guadalajara, UD Socuéllamos and CD Olímpic de Xàtiva.
