= RSD Alcalá B =

Alcalá B
- Full name: Real Sociedad Deportiva Alcalá B
- Founded: 1980
- Ground: Spain Alcala (El Val-H.A.), Alcalá de Henares, Madrid,
- Capacity: 800
- Chairman: Jorge Carretero
- Manager: Angel Custodio Rodriguez
- League: Segunda de Aficionados – Group 4
Home colours	Away colours

Real Sociedad Deportiva Alcalá B is a Spanish football team based in Alcalá de Henares in the Community of Madrid. Founded in 1980, it is the reserve team of RSD Alcalá, and plays in Segunda de Aficionados – Group 4, holding home matches at Estadio Alcala (El Val-H.A.), with a capacity of 800.

== History ==
=== Club background ===
- Asociación Deportiva Pastelerías Mallorca (1980–1996)
- Deportivo Alcalá Club de Fútbol (1996–1999)
- Real Sociedad Deportiva Alcalá B (1999–)

== Season to season ==
- As an independent club

Season	Tier	Division	Place	Copa del Rey
1981–82	9	3ª Reg.	6th	
1982–83	8	3ª Reg. P.	11th	
1983–84	8	3ª Reg. P.	15th	
1984–85	8	3ª Reg. P.	5th	
1985–86	8	3ª Reg. P.	5th	
1986–87	7	2ª Reg.	2nd	
1987–88	6	1ª Reg.	8th	
1988–89	6	1ª Reg.	7th	
1989–90	6	1ª Reg.	8th	

Season	Tier	Division	Place	Copa del Rey
1990–91	6	1ª Reg.	3rd	
1991–92	6	1ª Reg.	3rd	
1992–93	6	1ª Reg.	3rd	
1993–94	6	1ª Reg.	2nd	
1994–95	5	Reg. Pref.	7th	
1995–96	5	Reg. Pref.	15th	
1996–97	6	1ª Reg.	1st	
1997–98	5	Reg. Pref.	5th	
1998–99	5	Reg. Pref.	11th	

- As a reserve team

Season	Tier	Division	Place
1999–2000	5	Reg. Pref.	11th
2000–01	5	Reg. Pref.	11th
2001–02	5	Reg. Pref.	9th
2002–03	5	Reg. Pref.	7th
2003–04	5	Reg. Pref.	5th
2004–05	5	Reg. Pref.	10th
2005–06	5	Reg. Pref.	8th
2006–07	5	Reg. Pref.	13th
2007–08	5	Reg. Pref.	10th
2008–09	5	Reg. Pref.	14th
2009–10	6	1ª Afic.	2nd
2010–11	5	Pref.	13th
2011–12	5	Pref.	8th
2012–13	5	Pref.	7th
2013–14	5	Pref.	3rd
2014–15	5	Pref.	17th
2015–16	6	1ª Afic.	2nd
2016–17	5	Pref.	11th
2017–18	5	Pref.	17th
2018–19	6	1ª Afic.	9th

Season	Tier	Division	Place
2019–20	6	1ª Afic.	8th
2020–2025	DNP		
2025–26	9	2ª Afic.	
