= Carson Buschman-Dormond =

Canadian soccer player (born 2002)

Personal information
- Full name: Carson Emanuel Buschman-Dormond
- Date of birth: October 27, 2002 (age 24)
- Place of birth: Vancouver, British Columbia, Canada
- Height: 1.88 m (6 ft 2 in)
- Position: Midfielder

Team information
- Current team: Altitude FC

Youth career
- Fusion FC
- 2015: Vancouver Whitecaps FC
- 2016–2019: Fusion FC
- 2019–2020: Blaise Soccer Academy

Senior career*
Years	Team	Apps	(Gls)
2021–2023	Viljandi JK Tulevik	12	(2)
2021–2023	→ FC Zürich II (loan)	43	(3)
2023	FC Sellier & Bellot Vlašim	0	(0)
2023	York United FC	5	(0)
2024	Altitude FC	9	(5)
2024	Balzan	5	(0)
2025–	Altitude FC	15	(8)
- * Club domestic league appearances and goals as of July 25, 2025

Carson Emanuel Buschman-Dormond (born October 27, 2002) is a Canadian soccer player who plays for Altitude FC in League1 British Columbia.

== Early life ==
Buschman-Dormond began playing youth soccer with Fusion FC, later joining the Vancouver Whitecaps Academy, where he played for one season when he was 12. He then returned to playing with Fusion FC and received a scholarship offer to Simon Fraser University to play with the men's soccer team, when he was in tenth grade. He then joined the Blaise Soccer Academy, run by former Swiss national team player Blaise Nkufo.

In 2019, he went on trial with Estonian club Viljandi JK Tulevik, but did not sign with them as he was underage, and afterwards trialed with Dutch side De Graafschap, before returning to Vancouver. Overall, he went on trial with seven different teams in six different countries, including the youth sides of German clubs Borussia Mönchengladbach and Hertha Berlin.

== Club career ==
In February 2021, he joined Estonian Meistriliiga side Viljandi JK Tulevik. He made his debut in the first game of the season on March 13 against FC Kuressaare, scoring his first goal in the match, which was named as the Goal of the Month. He scored two goals and added three assists in twelve league matches, also helping the club reach the semi-finals of the Estonian Cup.

In June 2021, he was sent on loan to Swiss club FC Zürich on a two-year loan, with a purchase option. He spent the majority of his time playing with the U21 side which played in the third tier Swiss Promotion League, but also appeared in eight friendlies with the first team.

In late June 2023, he signed with Czech club FC Sellier & Bellot Vlašim, ahead of the 2023-24 season. However, a few weeks later in July 2023, he signed with Canadian Premier League club York United FC for the remainder of the 2023 season, with a club option for 2024.

In April 2024, he joined Altitude FC in League1 British Columbia.

In July 2024, he signed with Balzan in the Maltese Premier League.

== Personal life ==
Buschman-Dormond is a dual Canadian and Dutch citizen.

== Career statistics ==
As of November 24, 2024

Club	Season	League			Playoffs		Domestic Cup		Continental		Total	
Club	Season	Division	Apps	Goals	Apps	Goals	Apps	Goals	Apps	Goals	Apps	Goals
Viljandi JK Tulevik	2021	Meistriliiga	12	2	–		2	0	–		14	2
FC Zürich II (loan)	2021–22	Swiss Promotion League	20	2	–		–		–		20	2
FC Zürich II (loan)	2022–23	Swiss Promotion League	23	1	–		–		–		23	1
FC Zürich II (loan)	Total		43	3	0	0	0	0	0	0	43	3
York United FC	2023	Canadian Premier League	5	0	1	0	0	0	–		6	0
Altitude FC	2024	League1 British Columbia	9	5	–		–		–		9	5
Balzan	2024–25	Maltese Premier League	5	0	–		0	0	–		5	0
Career total			74	10	1	0	2	0	0	0	77	10
