= Matthew Baldisimo =

Filipino footballer (born 1998)

Personal information
- Full name: Matthew Anthony Otucan Baldisimo
- Date of birth: January 20, 1998 (age 28)
- Place of birth: Vancouver, British Columbia, Canada
- Height: 1.75 m (5 ft 9 in)
- Position: Defensive midfielder

Team information
- Current team: Pacific FC

Youth career
- Wesburn YSC
- South Burnaby Metro Club
- Burnaby Metro Selects SC
- 2011–2016: Vancouver Whitecaps FC

Senior career*
Years	Team	Apps	(Gls)
2016–2017	Whitecaps FC 2	46	(0)
2017	→ Vancouver Whitecaps FC (loan)	0	(0)
2018	Fresno FC	3	(0)
2019–2022	Pacific FC	51	(0)
2022	→ York United (loan)	3	(0)
2023–2024	York United	27	(1)
2025–2026	Pacific FC	18	(0)

International career^{‡}
2013	Canada U15		
2014	Canada U16		
2015	Canada U17	4	(1)
2024–	Philippines	1	(0)
- * Club domestic league appearances and goals as of August 30. 2026 ‡ National team caps and goals as of 17:10, September 4, 2024 (UTC)

Matthew Anthony Otucan Baldisimo (born January 20, 1998) is a professional footballer who plays as a midfielder for Canadian Premier League club Pacific FC. Born in Canada, plays for the Philippines national team, after having previously represented Canada at youth level.

== Early life ==
Baldisimo began playing soccer at age four with Wesburn Youth SC. Afterwards, he played with South Burnaby Metro Club and Burnaby Metro Selects SC, serving as team captain and being named U14 MVP with the latter. He was also part of the British Columbia provincial team at U13 level, where he was the co-captain. In 2011, he joined the Vancouver Whitecaps FC Academy and in 2015 was the recipient of the club's 2015 BMO Registered Education Savings Plan Youth Soccer Player award.

== Club career ==
In February 2016, Baldisimo attended training camp with the Vancouver Whitecaps FC first team, before signing his first professional contract with the second team, Whitecaps FC 2, who played in the USL. He made his professional debut on March 26, 2017, against Orange County Blues FC. Baldisimo, along with fellow Whitecaps Academy products Kadin Chung and Thomas Gardner were praised during the club's USL playoff run in the 2016 USL season

In May 2017, Baldisimo signed a short-term loan with the Vancouver Whitecaps first team for a 2017 Canadian Championship.

In December 2017, Baldisimo signed with the Whitecaps' new USL affiliate Fresno FC, after the Whitecaps disbanded their second team.

In January 2019, he joined Canadian Premier League club Pacific FC for their inaugural season. After the 2020 season, he re-signed with the club for the 2021 season. In 2021, he won the CPL title with the club. In February 2022, he once again re-signed with the club for another season. Over his four seasons with Pacific, he made 56 appearances across all competitions.

In August 2022, Baldisimo was loaned to fellow CPL club York United, as part of an intra-league player swap that involved Cédric Toussaint joining Pacific FC. In December 2022, the club announced Baldisimo would remain with York on a permanent contract, signing a one-year deal with an option for 2024. He scored his first CPL goal on May 23, 2023, against the HFX Wanderers.

In August 2025, he returned to Pacific FC, signing for the remainder of the season, with an option for 2026.

== International career ==
At the international level, Baldisimo is eligible to represent Canada by birth and the Philippines through parentage.

=== Canada ===
In June 2013, he made his debut in the Canada youth program, attending a Canada U15 camp. In August 2013, he was named to the Canada U15 team for the Copa Mexico de Naciones. In April 2014, he was named to the Canada U16 squad for the Montaigu Tournament in France, as well as for the U16 Copa Mexico de Naciones. In February 2015, Baldisimo was named to the Canada U17 team for the 2015 CONCACAF U-17 Championship and was named team captain. On February 28, 2015, he scored the winning goal in the team's first match of the tournament against Haiti U17.

=== Philippines ===
In 2020, he was set to join the Philippines national team for a camp, however, the camp was ultimately cancelled due to the COVID-19 pandemic. In May 2021, Baldisimo was finally able to accept his first call-up to the Philippines national team ahead of three 2022 FIFA World Cup qualification matches. However, due to a FIFA registration and eligibility issue, he was unable to appear in a match for the squad. Two days after departing the camp, he was notified by FIFA that his one-time switch paperwork was now officially processed and he would now be eligible to officially represent the Philippines. In November 2021, Baldisimo was called up for the rescheduled 2020 AFF Championship, but had to withdraw due to injury.

In March 2024, Baldisimo accepted a call-up to the squad ahead of two 2026 FIFA World Cup qualification matches against Iraq. He made his debut on September 4, 2024, in a 2024 Merdeka Tournament match against Malaysia.

== Personal ==
Baldisimo is the older brother of Michael Baldisimo, who is also a professional soccer player.

== Honours ==
=== Club ===
Pacific FC

- Canadian Premier League: 2021
