= Brem Soumaoro =

Professional footballer (born 1996)

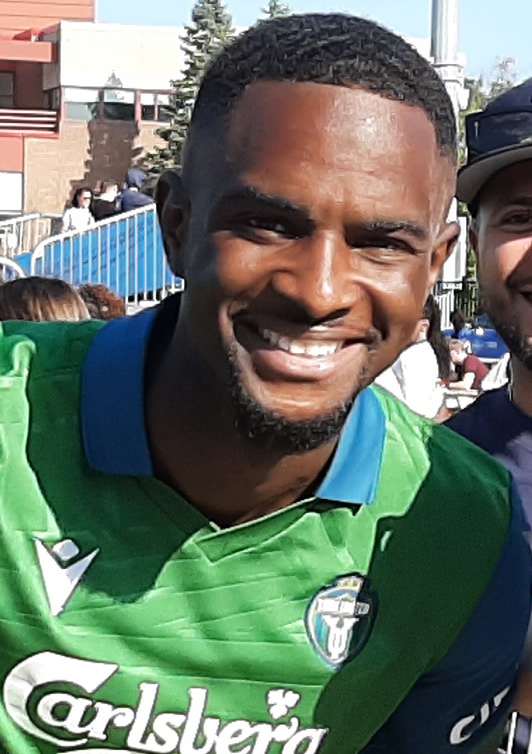
- Soumaoro in 2023

Personal information
- Full name: Abrahim Mohamed Soumaoro
- Date of birth: 8 August 1996 (age 30)
- Place of birth: Nzérékoré, Guinea
- Height: 1.87 m (6 ft 1 1/2 in)
- Position: Defensive midfielder

Team information
- Current team: Sporting JAX
- Number: 32

Youth career
- 2004–2007: Sparta Enschede
- 2007–2014: Twente

Senior career*
Years	Team	Apps	(Gls)
2014–2017	Jong Twente	26	(0)
2017–2018	Go Ahead Eagles	19	(0)
2018–2019	Livorno	3	(0)
2020	Jong Twente	2	(0)
2020–2021	Den Bosch	13	(0)
2021	MVV Maastricht	31	(0)
2021–2022	PAEEK	17	(0)
2023–2024	York United	35	(2)
2024–2025	Indy Eleven	15	(0)
2026–	Sporting JAX	4	(0)

International career^{‡}
2021–	Liberia	9	(0)
- * Club domestic league appearances and goals as of 16:55, 8 November 2026 (UTC) ‡ National team caps and goals as of 20:12, 13 September 2023 (UTC)

Abrahim Mohamed "Brem" Soumaoro (born 8 August 1996) is a professional footballer who plays as a midfielder for USL Championship club Sporting JAX. Born in Guinea, he represents the Liberia national team.

== Club career ==
=== Jong FC Twente ===
Soumaoro made his Eerste Divisie debut for Jong FC Twente on 29 August 2014 in a game against RKC Waalwijk.

=== SpVgg Greuther Fürth ===
In July 2018, after being released by Go Ahead Eagles, he trialled with 2. Bundesliga side SpVgg Greuther Fürth.

=== A.S. Livorno Calcio ===
On 10 August 2018, Soumaoro joined Italian Serie B club Livorno. He left the club in 2019, before signing with Jong FC Twente again in early 2020. In August 2020, he moved to FC Den Bosch. He left the club on 1 January 2021, to join MVV Maastricht on a deal for the rest of the season.

=== York United FC ===
On 1 February 2023, Soumaoro joined Canadian Premier League side York United, signing a one-year deal, including club options for a further extension. In August 2024, he agreed to a mutual termination of the remainder of his contract.

=== Indy Eleven ===
On 3 September 2024, USL Championship club Indy Eleven announced the signing of Soumaoro. He made his debut for the Indianapolis-based club on 7 September 2024 in a 0–0 draw against Hartford Athletic. Soumaoro ended the season with 9 total appearances for the club, including the club's playoff loss to Rhode Island FC. On 21 November 2024, Indy Eleven announced that Soumaoro would remain with the club for the 2025 season.

=== Sporting Club Jacksonville ===
USL Championship expansion club, Sporting Club Jacksonville, also known as Sporting JAX, announced on 23 December 2025, that Soumaoro had signed with their men's team.

== International career ==
Born in Guinea, Soumaoro is also eligible to represent Liberia through his parents. In August 2021, he accepted a call up from the Liberian national team for a series of World Cup qualifiers against Nigeria and Central African Republic. He made his debut on 3 September 2021 in a 2–0 away loss to Nigeria, starting and playing the entire match.
