= 2023 Forge FC season =

Forge FC 2023 soccer season

Forge FC
2023 season
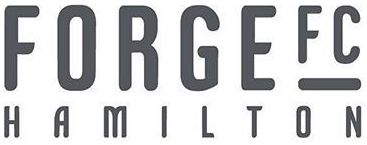
- Owner: Hamilton Sports Group
- Chairman: Bob Young
- Head coach: Bobby Smyrniotis
- Stadium: Tim Hortons Field
- Canadian Premier League: 2nd
- CPL playoffs: Winners
- Canadian Championship: Semi-finals
- Top goalscorer: League: Terran Campbell; Woobens Pacius (10 each); All: Woobens Pacius (11)
- Highest home attendance: 13,925 vs. Cavalry FC (October 28, CPL final)
- Lowest home attendance: 2,117 vs. FC Laval (April 18, Canadian Championship)
- Average home league attendance: 5,318
- Biggest win: 4–0 vs. York United FC (Away, July 9, CPL)
- Biggest defeat: 0–3 vs. Cavalry FC (Away, August 4, CPL)
Home colours	Away colours

The 2023 Forge FC season was the fifth season in the history of Forge FC and the club's fifth season in the Canadian Premier League (CPL), the top flight in Canadian soccer. Forge were the defending CPL champions, having defeated Atlético Ottawa in the 2022 Canadian Premier League final. The club was managed by Bobby Smyrniotis in his fifth season as head coach and first season as sporting director. This was Forge FC's first season without any matches in international competitions after having failed to qualify for the 2023 CONCACAF Champions League.

Forge won a record-extending fourth CPL championship, defeating regular-season champions Cavalry FC 2–1 at home in the 2023 Canadian Premier League final. As champions, they qualified for the 2024 CONCACAF Champions Cup, returning the club to international competition in 2024 after a one-year absence. In addition, Forge finished second in the CPL season and reached the semi-finals of the Canadian Championship.

== Review ==
=== Background ===
Forge FC entered the season as the reigning Canadian Premier League champions after having won the 2022 Canadian Premier League final against Atlético Ottawa. This was the club's third CPL title and fourth finals appearance in four years, leading to the Canadian Premier League and several pundits to declare Forge FC to be a dynasty.

Beginning this season, the top five CPL teams qualified for the playoffs, and both the Canadian Premier League champion and regular season winner qualified for the newly reorganized and expanded CONCACAF Champions Cup. Along with the Champions Cup spot awarded to the winner of the Canadian Championship, Forge had three qualification paths to the 2024 CONCACAF Champions Cup. As a result of the reorganization, the 2022 CPL champions were not given a spot in any CONCACAF competitions, making this the first season in Forge's history not to include any international competitive matches. The club's goal entering the 2023 season was to return to international competition and qualify for the 2024 CONCACAF Champions Cup.

Forge retained most of its roster from the previous season; the club's highest profile off-season move was to add Canadian international Manjrekar James to replace outgoing cenre-back Daniël Krutzen in defence. Entering the season, Forge FC were favoured to repeat as Canadian Premier League champions.

=== April ===

Forge FC's opening day starting lineup against Cavalry FC

Forge began its season on April 15 at home against rivals Cavalry FC. This was a rematch of the 2022 playoff semifinal where Forge defeated Cavalry 3–2 on aggregate on their way to the championship. Club captain Kyle Bekker served the second game of a two-match suspension following his red card in the second leg of that semifinal, while midfielder Sebastian Castello missed the match due to injury. Manjrekar James made his debut for the club in an entertaining match where Forge came back from 1–0 and 2–1 deficits to secure a 2–2 draw. Forge's first goal came from a Jordan Hamilton penalty in the 41st minute after he was hauled down by Cavalry goalkeeper Marco Carducci. Noah Jensen scored on a volley in the 76th minute to tie the match 2–2, helping to earn himself Player of the Match honours and a spot in the CPL Team of the Week. For the fifth consecutive year, Forge were unable to win on opening day; this draw brought their record in season openers to three draws and two losses.

Three days later, Forge entered the Canadian Championship in the preliminary round with a home match against FC Laval, making this the second year in a row that the Hammers hosted a PLSQ side. Entering the match, Forge coach Bobby Smyrniotis highlighted the importance of this cup tournament for the club, describing it as "a competition that we want" and the Voyageurs Cup as "a trophy that we don’t have in our cabinet." Heavily favoured against their semi-pro opponent, Forge delivered with a 3–0 win. Noah Jensen was the star again, scoring a brace, while Woobens Pacius scored a penalty. The match was Tristan Borges's 100th for Forge in all competitions, making him the fifth player in club history to achieve this milestone. The win advanced Forge to the Canadian Championship quarter-finals where they would face Atlético Ottawa.

On April 22, Forge hosted HFX Wanderers FC for the first time under their new head coach, Patrice Gheisar. Gheisar and Bobby Smyrniotis had previously coached against each other in League1 Ontario where Gheisar coached Vaughan Azzurri and Smyrniotis coached Sigma FC. After the Wanderers took a 1–0 first half lead, Woobens Pacius scored a late 89th minute equaliser to lift the Hammers to a 1–1 draw. He was the beneficiary of a favourable deflection that came off of a shot from Aboubacar Sissoko. Notwithstanding the equalizer, Forge struggled to convert their scoring chances into goals, leading Smyrniotis to comment after the match that the team needed to "be a little more clinical in the final third [of the field]." For midfielder Alessandro Hojabrpour, the match was his 100th in all competitions for CPL clubs, split between Pacific FC and Forge.

In their next match, Forge played away from home at Starlight Stadium against Pacific FC in a battle of the only ever CPL champions. Goalkeeper Christopher Kalongo picked up an injury before the match, joining the still-injured Sebastian Castello as unavailable. Returning from injury was Kyle Bekker who made his season debut in the match. Woobens Pacius headed in an Ashtone Morgan cross in the 17th minute that stood up as the match winner as Forge won 1–0 in Langford. It was Pacius's third goal in three games, tying him with Tristan Borges for first all-time in goals in all competitions for Forge FC. After the match, Bobby Smyrniotis drew attention to Pacius by comparing him and his scoring ability to that of Canadian international Cyle Larin, Smyrniotis's former protégé. Manjrekar James was dominant in defence to help stymie Pacific and secure the clean sheet, earning him Player of the Match. He was joined by Ashtone Morgan and Aboubacar Sissoko in being named to the CPL Team of the Week, and he was honoured as the CPL Player of the Week.

Forge ended April undefeated, tied with Valour FC atop the CPL standings. For the team's success, Bobby Smyrniotis was named the CPL Manager of the Month.

=== May ===
Forge continued their winning ways with a 1–0 road win on May 5 against 905 Derby rival York United FC. Terran Campbell scored the match's only goal in the 21st minute in an intense match that included a red card to Ashtone Morgan. (Note: Morgan's red card suspension was withdrawn by Canada Soccer following an appeal.) Khadim Kane made his professional debut for Forge in the match as a substitute.

On May 9, Forge returned to Canadian Championship action in a quarter-final matchup against Atlético Ottawa in Hamilton. This was the first meeting between these two teams since the 2022 CPL Final. Kyle Bekker scored the game's opening goal in the 76th minute, only to have Atlético's Ollie Bassett score an equalizing penalty in the 87th minute to force the match to a penalty shoot-out. Noah Jensen, Alexander Achinioti-Jönsson, and Aboubacar Sissoko scored for Forge while Triston Henry made two saves to lead Forge to a 3–2 win. This was the Hammers' first ever win in a penalty shoot-out and qualified the team for the Canadian Championship semi-finals.

Returning to CPL play, Forge defeated Valour 3–2 on May 13 for their third consecutive league win. Kwasi Poku broke the deadlock with a 77th-minute winner while Jordan Hamilton scored the 200th goal in Forge's history. Forge then hosted expansion side Vancouver FC on May 19 in the first ever match between the two clubs. Christopher Kalongo secured his first clean sheet for Forge in a 0–0 draw. This was Forge's first ever scoreless draw at home in league play. (Note: Forge had previously drawn 0–0 at home against Panamanian club Independiente in the 2021 CONCACAF League and against CF Montréal in the 2021 Canadian Championship.)

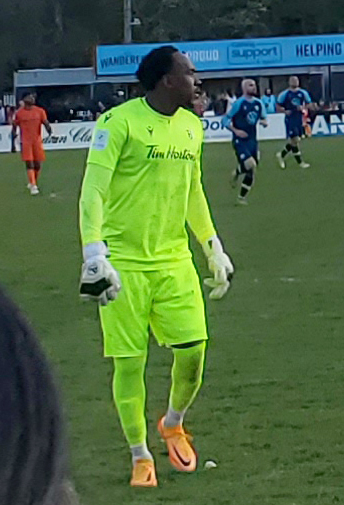
Triston Henry in 2022

Forge then travelled to Montreal's Saputo Stadium to face CF Montréal on May 24 in the semi-final of the Canadian Championship. This was Forge's third consecutive year facing CF Montréal in the tournament after losing to them in penalties following a 0–0 draw in 2021 and losing 3–0 thanks to a Sunusi Ibrahim hat-trick in 2022. Forge held their own for a large stretch of the match before ultimately falling 2–0, eliminating them from the competition. Ariel Lassiter opened the scoring for Montreal in the 53rd minute with a goal that deflected in off of Alessandro Hojabrpour and Sunisi Imbrahim put the match away with a powerful shot from inside the penalty box in the 78th minute.

On May 27, David Choinière scored in second half stoppage time secure a 1–0 road win against Atlético Ottawa at TD Place Stadium. Triston Henry made eight saves to earn a clean sheet as well as a spot in the CPL Team of the Week and CPL Player of the Week honours. At the quarter mark of the season, Forge had four wins and three draws and were off to their best start to a CPL season in club history. The club's undefeated run ended in their very next match back home on May 31 with a 2–1 loss to York United. Terran Campbell scored a 76th equalizer to erase an earlier own goal from Alessandro Hojabrpour, however the match was ultimately decided in York's favour with a Brem Soumaoro stoppage time screamer.

Forge held first place in the CPL table for the duration of the month. At its conclusion, Triston Henry was honoured by the league as its Goalkeeper of the Month for May.

== Squad ==
As of October 28, 2023

No.	Player	Nationality	Position(s)	Date of birth (age)	Previous club	Notes
Goalkeepers
1	Triston Henry	(Canada)	GK	September 8, 1993 (aged 30)	(Canada) Sigma FC	
29	Christopher Kalongo	(Canada)	GK	January 7, 2002 (aged 21)	(Canada) Sigma FC	U21
42	Emmanuel Marmolejo	(Canada)	GK	June 14, 2007 (aged 16)	(Canada) Sigma FC	U21, DEV
Defenders
2	Malcolm Duncan	(Canada)	DF	September 4, 1999 (aged 24)	(Canada) Sigma FC	
4	Dominic Samuel	(Canada)	CB / RB	September 29, 1994 (aged 29)	(Canada) Sigma FC	
5	Manjrekar James	(Canada)	CB	August 5, 1993 (aged 30)	(Ukraine) Chornomorets Odesa	
23	Garven-Michée Metusala	(Haiti)	CB / FB	December 31, 1999 (aged 23)	(Canada) A.S. Blainville	
24	Rezart Rama	(Albania)	CB	December 4, 2000 (aged 22)	(England) Nottingham Forest	INT
81	Malik Owolabi-Belewu	(England)	DF	July 3, 2002 (aged 21)	(Italy) S.P.A.L.	INT
	Simon Guardiero	(Canada)	DF	July 7, 2006 (aged 17)	(Canada) Sigma FC	U21, DEV
Midfielders
10	Kyle Bekker	(Canada)	AM / CM	September 2, 1990 (aged 33)	(United States) North Carolina FC	
12	Sebastian Castello	(Canada)	MF	October 8, 2003 (aged 20)	(Canada) Sigma FC	U21
13	Alexander Achinioti-Jönsson	(Sweden)	DM / CB	April 17, 1996 (aged 27)	(Sweden) IFK Värnamo	INT
20	Kwasi Poku	(Canada)	MF	February 6, 2003 (aged 20)	(Canada) Toronto FC II	U21
21	Alessandro Hojabrpour	(Canada)	DM	January 10, 2000 (aged 23)	(Canada) Pacific FC	
22	Noah Jensen	(Canada)	MF	July 20, 1999 (aged 24)	(United States) Oakland University	
33	Aboubacar Sissoko	(Mali)	MF	October 9, 1995 (aged 28)	(United States) Indy Eleven	
64	Khadim Kane	(Canada)	MF	May 17, 2005 (aged 18)	(Canada) CF Montréal U23	U21, EYT
Forwards
7	David Choinière	(Canada)	LW / RW	February 7, 1997 (aged 26)	(Canada) Montreal Impact	
9	Jordan Hamilton	(Canada)	ST	March 17, 1996 (aged 27)	(Republic of Ireland) Sligo Rovers	
14	Terran Campbell	(Canada)	ST / LW	October 10, 1998 (aged 25)	(Canada) Pacific FC	
17	Woobens Pacius	(Canada)	FW	May 11, 2001 (aged 22)	(Canada) CF Montréal Academy	
19	Tristan Borges	(Canada)	RW / LW / AM	August 26, 1998 (aged 25)	(Belgium) OH Leuven	
37	Kevaughn Tavernier	(Canada)	FW	February 24, 2006 (aged 17)	(Canada) Sigma FC	U21, DEV
39	Béni Badibanga	(Belgium)	FW	February 19, 1996 (aged 27)	(Belgium) RAAL La Louvière	INT

=== Roster rules ===
As a Canadian Premier League club, Forge FC's roster must conform to the league's roster rules and regulations.

On July 20, the Canadian Premier League introduced a new Exceptional Young Talent (EYT) roster subcategory retroactive to July 14. CPL teams can name a maximum of two domestic U-18 players to this category and they do not count against the club's salary cap or 23-player main roster. On the day that the new roster subcategory was announced, Forge designated 18-year-old midfielder Khadim Kane as an EYT.

== Transfers ==
=== In ===
The 2023 transfer windows were open from February 10 to May 4 and from July 7 to August 4. The Canadian Premier League also institutes a roster freeze; after September 1, clubs may only sign new players in cases of "extreme hardship".

No.	Pos.	Player	From club	Fee/notes	Date	Source
5	DF	(Canada) Manjrekar James	(Ukraine) Chornomorets Odesa	Free	March 10, 2023	
64	MF	(Canada) Khadim Kane	(Canada) CF Montréal U23	Free	April 14, 2023	
2	DF	(Canada) Malcolm Duncan	(Canada) Sigma FC	Free	April 14, 2023	
42	GK	(Canada) Emmanuel Marmolejo	(Canada) Sigma FC	Development contract	April 18, 2023	
30	GK	(Canada) Rimi Olatunji	(United States) Peoria City	Short-term contract	April 20, 2023	
36	MF	(Canada) Daniel Firek	(Canada) Sigma FC	Development contract	June 25, 2023	
37	FW	(Canada) Kevaughn Tavernier	(Canada) Sigma FC	Development contract	June 25, 2023	
	DF	(Canada) Simon Guardiero	(Canada) Sigma FC	Development contract	June 25, 2023	
39	FW	(Belgium) Béni Badibanga	(Belgium) RAAL La Louvière	Free	July 27, 2023	

==== Draft picks ====
Forge FC made the following selections in the 2023 CPL–U Sports Draft. Draft picks are not automatically signed to the team roster. Only those who are signed to a contract will be listed as transfers in.

Round	Selection	Pos.	Player	Nationality	University
1	9	FW	Miles Green	Canada	McMaster
2	16	DF	Milo Djuricic	Canada	York

=== Out ===
No.	Pos.	Player	To club	Fee/notes	Date	Source
	MF	(Canada) Shamit Shome	(Canada) Cavalry FC	Option declined	January 18, 2023	
5	DF	(Netherlands) Daniël Krutzen	(United States) Phoenix Rising	Contract expired	January 22, 2023	
2	DF	(Canada) Jonathan Grant	(Canada) York United	Option declined	January 25, 2023	
16	DF	(Canada) Cale Loughrey	(Canada) HFX Wanderers FC	Option declined	January 25, 2023	
11	FW	(Canada) Chris Nanco	(United States) Des Moines Menace	Contract expired	January 25, 2023	
14	FW	(Guyana) Emery Welshman	(Canada) Sigma FC	Contract expired	January 25, 2023	
3	DF	(Canada) Ashtone Morgan	Retired		July 31, 2023	
30	GK	(Canada) Rimi Olatunji			August 9, 2023	

=== Loans out ===
Forge FC is affiliated with Sigma FC of League1 Ontario as part of the CPL's Downward Player Movement Pilot Project. The following Forge FC players featured for Sigma FC during the 2023 League1 Ontario season.

No.	Pos.	Player	Games	Notes	Source
2	DF	(Canada) Malcolm Duncan	1	First featured for Sigma FC on April 22, 2023.	
20	MF	(Canada) Kwasi Poku	1	First featured for Sigma FC on April 29, 2023.	
30	GK	(Canada) Rimi Olatunji	8	First featured for Sigma FC on May 13, 2023.	
64	MF	(Canada) Khadim Kane	2	First featured for Sigma FC on April 22, 2023.	

== Club ==
=== Staff ===
As of September 6, 2023

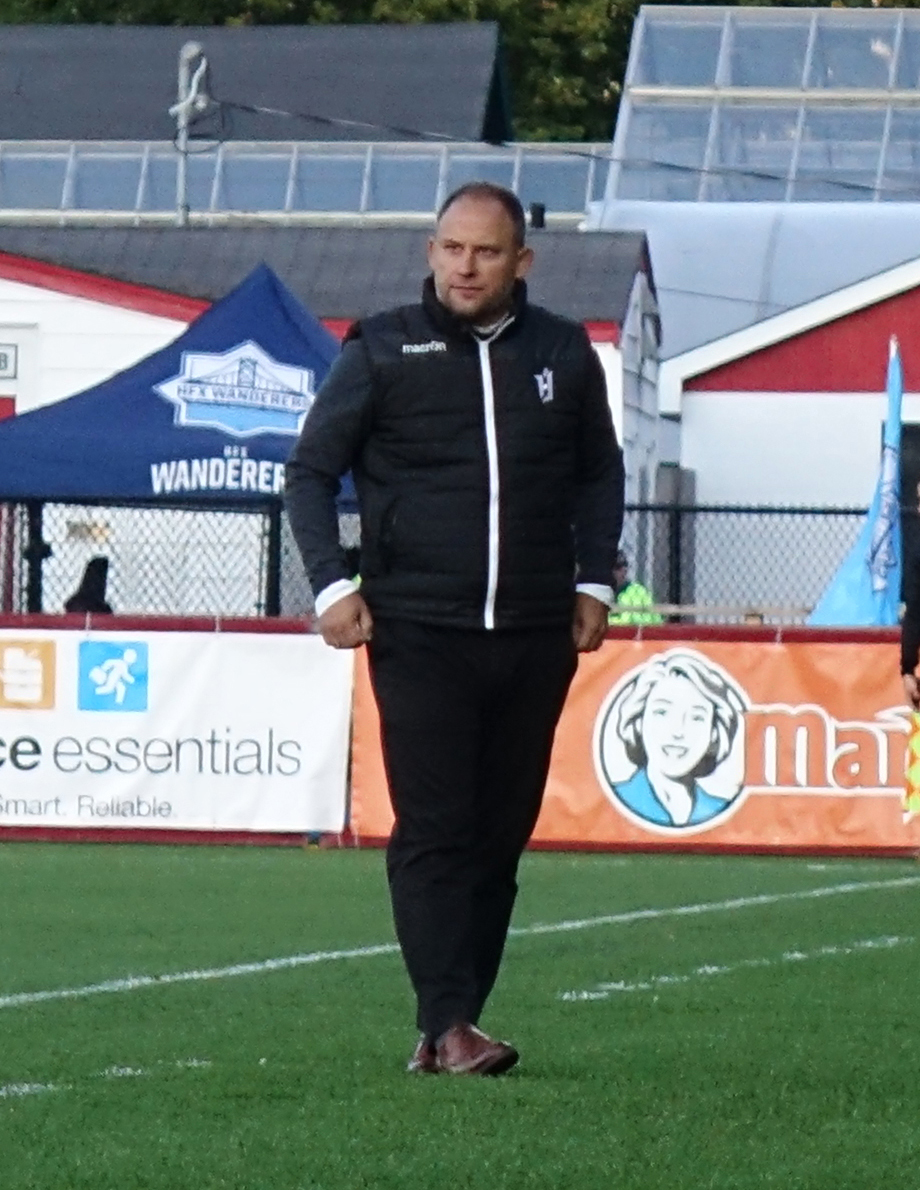
Head coach Bobby Smyrniotis in 2019

Executive
Caretaker	Bob Young
Managing partner and chief executive officer	Scott Mitchell
President and chief operating officer	Matt Afinec
Vice president of business operations	Nicole Demers
Coaching staff
Head coach and sporting director	Bobby Smyrniotis
Assistant coach	David Edgar
Assistant coach	Kyt Selaidopoulos
Assistant coach / goalkeepers coach	Johan Albert
Director of soccer operations	Jelani Smith
Equipment manager	Joe Hanley
Strength and conditioning coach and sport scientist	Jacob Miller
Athletic therapist	Liam MacPherson

On April 12, Costa Smyrniotis left the club to join the CPL as Executive Vice President, Soccer. He had been the club's Director of Football and Business since 2018 and had been a key architect of the team's early success, including three CPL championships.

On May 1, Forge announced that it had signed technical director and head coach Bobby Smyrniotis to a four-year contract extension and expanded his role as head coach and sporting director. He had previously been linked to CF Montréal's head coaching vacancy as well as others in MLS and Europe during the preceding off-season. Over the following days, the club also announced the promotions of Jelani Smith to director of soccer operations and Nicole Demers to vice president of business operations.

=== Club partnerships ===
On March 31, Forge announced Hamilton United Elite as an official Forge FC Development Club, joining Sigma FC in the club's youth structure. As part of the agreement, Forge provided technical leadership and guidance to Hamilton United's coaching staff as well as season passes to their youth players. Hamilton United also changed its logo and colours to match Forge's orange, grey, and white.

On April 13, Forge made another partnership announcement by revealing eight official "Forge FC Youth Partner Clubs":

- Mount Hamilton YSC
- Saltfleet Stoney Creek SC
- Flamborough Dundas SC
- Force Academy
- Oakville SC
- Ancaster Legacy FC
- Grimsby Town YSC
- St. Catharines Roma Wolves

On April 21, the CPL announced a "downward player movement pilot project" to allow its clubs to each have an affiliate club that they can send players to get additional game time. That same day, Forge announced Sigma FC as their affiliate. Forge quickly took advantage of the affiliation by sending Malcolm Duncan and Khadim Kane to Sigma to start in a match the next day.

=== Community initiatives ===
On September 9, Forge hosted its second annual Spark Summit, an event aimed at connecting and inspiring professional women in the sports and entertainment industry. Other club initiatives during the season included youth soccer clinics, a high-performance training program, a coaches clinic, an international night, and a food drive in support of Good Shepherd.

=== Kits ===
Forge FC unveiled its 2023 primary and alternate kits at a supporters event on March 14 hosted at Tim Hortons Field. Both kits draw inspiration from Hamilton's city flag by featuring a six-link chain that represents the communities of Hamilton, Ancaster, Dundas, Flamborough, Glanbrook, and Stoney Creek. The kits continue to be produced by Macron and sponsored by Tim Hortons for a fifth consecutive season and for the first time feature sponsorship from CIBC on the left sleeve.

== Preseason and friendlies ==
On February 13, Forge took to the field to begin its preseason. The club travelled to Costa Rica on March 16 for two weeks of training in Alajuela where they played friendlies against Primera División sides Cartaginés, LD Alajuelense, and Deportivo Saprissa, as well as the Costa Rica national under-20 football team. The team also played preseason friendlies against League1 Ontario side Sigma FC, NCAA Division I's Syracuse Orange and Akron Zips, U Sports's York Lions, and fellow CPL side and 905 Derby rival York United.

=== Friendlies ===
Win Draw Loss Fixtures

March 4 Friendly	Forge FC (Canada)	v	(United States) Syracuse Orange	Hamilton, Ontario
2:00pm				Stadium: Tim Hortons Field

March 5 Friendly	Forge FC (Canada)	v	(United States) Akron Zips	Hamilton, Ontario
2:00pm				Stadium: Tim Hortons Field

March 20 Friendly	Deportivo Saprissa (Costa Rica)	v	(Canada) Forge FC

March 22 Friendly	C.S. Cartaginés (Costa Rica)	v	(Canada) Forge FC	Cartago, Costa Rica
				Stadium: Estadio José Rafael Fello Meza Ivankovich

March 27 Friendly	Costa Rica U20	0–7	(Canada) Forge FC	Alajuela, Costa Rica
				Stadium: Proyecto Goal

April 1 Friendly	Forge FC	v	York United FC	Hamilton, Ontario
				Stadium: Tim Hortons Field; Referee: Marie-Soleil Beaudoin

== Competitions ==
Matches are listed in Hamilton local time: Eastern Daylight Time (UTC−4)

=== Overview ===
Competition	First match	Last match	Starting round	Final position	Record							
Competition	First match	Last match	Starting round	Final position	Pld	W	D	L	GF	GA	GD	Win %
Canadian Premier League	April 15	October 7	Matchday 1	2nd	28	11	9	8	39	32	+7	39.29
CPL Playoffs	October 14	October 28	First semifinal	Winners	2	2	0	0	4	2	+2	100.00
Canadian Championship	April 18	May 24	Preliminary round	Semi-finals	3	1	1	1	4	3	+1	33.33
Total					33	14	10	9	47	37	+10	42.42

Last updated: October 28
Source: Competitions

=== Canadian Premier League ===
==== Table ====
Pos	Team	Pld	W	D	L	GF	GA	GD	Pts	Playoff qualification
1	Cavalry (S)	28	16	7	5	46	27	+19	55	First semifinal
2	Forge (C)	28	11	9	8	39	32	+7	42 (Note: Tie resolved by away goal differential; Forge: +4, Wanderers: −2)	First semifinal
3	HFX Wanderers	28	11	9	8	39	32	+7	42	Quarterfinal
4	Pacific	28	11	7	10	42	35	+7	40	Play-in round
5	York United	28	11	5	12	35	44	−9	38	Play-in round
6	Atlético Ottawa	28	10	6	12	38	34	+4	36	
7	Vancouver	28	8	5	15	28	50	−22	29	
8	Valour	28	6	8	14	25	38	−13	26	

Source: CanPL
Rules for classification: 1) Points; 2) Total wins; 3) Goal difference; 4) Goals scored; 5) Away goal differential; 6) Away goals scored; 7) Home goal differential; 8) Home goals scored; 9) Total minutes played by U-21 players; 10) Coin toss (2 teams tied) or drawing of lots (3+ teams tied).
(C) Champion (qualified to Champions Cup); (S) CPL Shield winner (qualified to Champions Cup)

==== Results by match ====
Match	1	2	3	4	5	6	7	8	9	10	11	12	13	14	15	16	17	18	19	20	21	22	23	24	25	26	27	28
Result	D	D	W	W	W	D	W	L	D	L	L	L	W	L	W	D	W	W	L	D	D	D	W	D	W	W	L	L
Position	4	5	2	1	1	1	1	1	1	3	3	3	2	3	2	3	3	2	3	3	4	5	3	3	3	2	2	2

Source: #Matches
W = Win; D = Draw; L = Loss

==== Matches ====
Forge FC's opening weekend match against Cavalry FC was announced on January 27, 2023. The rest of the schedule was announced on January 30.

April 15 1	Forge FC	2–2	Cavalry FC	Hamilton, Ontario
4:00 pm	Hamilton 41' (pen.); Rama (yellow card) 42'; Choinière (yellow card) 74'; Jensen 76'; Morgan (yellow card) 88'	Report	Bevan 36', (yellow card) 44'; Daley (yellow card) 59'; Cantave 64'	Stadium: Tim Hortons Field; Attendance: 6,892; Referee: Marie-Soleil Beaudoin

April 22 2	Forge FC	1–1	HFX Wanderers FC	Hamilton, Ontario
4:00 pm	James (yellow card) 77'; Pacius 89'	Report	Ferrin 42'; Callegari (yellow card) 49'; Nimick (yellow card) 74'; Ferrazzo (yellow card) 88'	Stadium: Tim Hortons Field; Attendance: 3,827; Referee: Fabrizio Stasolla

April 30 3	Pacific FC	0–1	Forge FC	Langford, British Columbia
8:00 pm	Young (yellow card) 68'	Report	Pacius 17', (yellow card) 57'; Henry (yellow card) 88'	Stadium: Starlight Stadium; Attendance: 3,378; Referee: Renzo Villanueva

May 5 4	York United FC	0–1	Forge FC	Toronto, Ontario
7:30 pm	Adekugbe (yellow card) 67'; Alou (yellow card) 76'	Report	Campbell 21'; Rama (yellow card) 39'; Owolabi-Belewu (yellow card) 68'; Kwasi Poku (yellow card) 80'; Morgan (red card) 90+1'; Kane (yellow card) 90+6'; Sissoko (yellow card) 90+7'	Stadium: York Lions Stadium; Attendance: 1,016; Referee: Myriam Marcotte
Note: Ashtone Morgan's red card was later rescinded.

May 13 5	Forge FC	3–2	Valour FC	Hamilton, Ontario
4:00 pm	Hamilton 33'; Bekker 50'; Kwasi Poku 77'; Henry (yellow card) 83'	Report	Williams 30'; Samaké 74'; Campbell (yellow card) 90+2'	Stadium: Tim Hortons Field; Attendance: 4,807; Referee: David Barrie

May 19 6	Forge FC	0–0	Vancouver FC	Hamilton, Ontario
7:00 pm	Hojabrpour (yellow card) 45'; Metusala (yellow card) 50'	Report	Moazeni Zadeh (yellow card) 47'; Bakare (yellow card) 88'; Robe (yellow card) 90+2'	Stadium: Tim Hortons Field; Attendance: 4,378; Referee: Myriam Marcotte

May 27 7	Atlético Ottawa	0–1	Forge FC	Ottawa, Ontario
7:00 pm	Espejo (yellow card) 30'	Report	Duncan (yellow card) 48'; Owolabi-Belewu (yellow card) 64'; Choinière 90+1'	Stadium: TD Place Stadium; Attendance: 4,520; Referee: Renzo Villanueva

May 31 8	Forge FC	1–2	York United FC	Hamilton, Ontario
7:00 pm	Rama (yellow card) 10'; Henry (yellow card) 10'; James (yellow card) 25'; Campbell 76'; Jensen (yellow card) 84'	Report	Hojabrpour 53' (o.g.); De Rosario (yellow card) 68'; Faye (yellow card) 70'; Ricci (yellow card) 74'; Babouli (yellow card) 80'; Giantsopoulos (yellow card) 83'; Soumaoro 90+3'	Stadium: Tim Hortons Field; Attendance: 4,225; Referee: Mathieu Souaré

June 3 9	Cavalry FC	1–1	Forge FC	Foothills County, Alberta
4:00 pm	Musse 9'; Daley (yellow card) 19'; Chima (yellow card) 43'; Camargo (yellow card) 65'; Kamdem (yellow card) 86'; Alarcón (yellow card) 87'; Trafford (yellow card) 89'	Report	Sissoko (yellow card) 30'; Achinioti-Jönsson (yellow card) 75'; Jordan Hamilton 90+4'	Stadium: ATCO Field; Attendance: 3,503; Referee: Scott Bowman

June 10 10	Forge FC	0–1	Pacific FC	Hamilton, Ontario
7:00 pm	James (yellow card) 33'	Report	Reid (yellow card) 29'; Daniels 85'	Stadium: Tim Hortons Field; Attendance: 5,013; Referee: Yusri Rudolf

June 16 11	Valour FC	2–0	Forge FC	Winnipeg, Manitoba
8:00 pm	Pianelli 39'; Campbell (yellow card) 60'; Ponce 63'; Ulloa (yellow card) 74'; Mzoughi (yellow card) 90+1'	Report	Rama (yellow card) 38'	Stadium: IG Field; Attendance: 3,350; Referee: Renzo Villanueva

June 20 12	Vancouver FC	2–0	Forge FC	Langley, British Columbia
10:00 pm	Tahid 35'; Kinani 39'; Moazeni Zadeh (yellow card) 70'; Romeo (yellow card) 81'	Report	Samuel (yellow card) 21'	Stadium: Willoughby Community Park; Attendance: 2,149; Referee: Seyed-Mohammad Mohseni

June 25 13	Forge FC	4–3	Atlético Ottawa	Hamilton, Ontario
6:00 pm	Niba 4' (o.g.); Campbell 11', 32'; Pacius (yellow card) 45+2', (goal) 81'; Sissoko (yellow card) 55'; Samuel (yellow card) 67'	Report	Antinoro 1'; Niba (yellow card) 45+4'; Tissot 64'; Salter (yellow card) 67'; dos Santos 72'	Stadium: Tim Hortons Field; Attendance: 6,917; Referee: Michael Venne

June 30 14	HFX Wanderers FC	2–1	Forge FC	Halifax, Nova Scotia
6:00 pm	Ferrin 25'; Timoteo (yellow card) 35'; Giraldo (yellow card) 46'; Loughrey (yellow card) 86'; Nimick 90+10' (pen.)	Report	Owolabi-Belewu (yellow card) 61'; Kwasi Poku (yellow card) 72'; Bekker 88'; Henry (yellow card) 90+8'; Samuel (yellow card) 90+11'	Stadium: Wanderers Grounds; Attendance: 6,145; Referee: Marie-Soleil Beaudoin

July 9 15	York United FC	0–4	Forge FC	Toronto, Ontario
7:00 pm	Ricci (yellow card) 35'; Babouli (red card) 85'	Report	Jensen (yellow card) 15'; Campbell 25', 33', 54'; Owolabi-Belewu (yellow card) 36'; James (yellow card) 45+3'; Borges 47'; Rama (yellow card) 63'; Pacius (yellow card) 90+2'	Stadium: York Lions Stadium; Attendance: 1,464; Referee: Yusri Rudolf
Note: Molham Babouli was sent off for York United FC while on the bench.

July 15 16	Forge FC	1–1	Valour FC	Hamilton, Ontario
7:00 pm	Campbell 66'	Report	Mzoughi (yellow card) 71'; Campbell (yellow card) 82'; Cela 85'; Baquero (yellow card) 89'	Stadium: Tim Hortons Field; Attendance: 5,179; Referee: Ben Hoskins

July 21 17	Pacific FC	0–2	Forge FC	Langford, British Columbia
10:00 pm	Toussaint (yellow card) 45'; Heard (yellow card) 71'	Report	Kwasi Poku 6'; Choinière 38'; Metusala (yellow card) 75'	Stadium: Starlight Stadium; Attendance: 3,311; Referee: Michael Venne

July 28 18	Forge FC	2–0	Vancouver FC	Hamilton, Ontario
7:00 pm	Sissoko 71'; Pacius 73'; Borges (yellow card) 90+1'	Report	Kwak (yellow card) 53'; Gyimah (yellow card) 90+3'	Stadium: Tim Hortons Field; Attendance: 5,232; Referee: Robert D'Alesio

August 4 19	Cavalry FC	3–0	Forge FC	Foothills County
9:00 pm	Kobza 49'; Daley (yellow card) 51'; Akio 61', (yellow card) 62'; Aird 82' (pen.); Shome (yellow card) 90+5'	Report		Stadium: ATCO Field; Attendance: 4,106; Referee: Ben Hoskins

August 12 20	Forge FC	3–3	York United FC	Hamilton, Ontario
7:00 pm	Bekker 27', (yellow card) 68'; Borges (yellow card) 45+1'; Campbell 54', 76'; Owolabi-Belewu (yellow card) 89'	Report	Gee (yellow card) 38'; Gagnon-Laparé (yellow card) 45+1'; dos Santos 48'; Wright 66'; Babouli 70', (yellow card) 74'	Stadium: Tim Hortons Field; Attendance: 5,071; Referee: Renzo Villanueva

August 19 21	Forge FC	1–1	HFX Wanderers FC	Hamilton, Ontario
7:00 pm	James (yellow card) 28'; Badibanga (yellow card) 65', (goal) 79'	Report	Nimick 29' (pen.), (yellow card) 58'; Fillion (yellow card) 62'; Fernandez (yellow card) 73'; Coimbra (yellow card) 78'	Stadium: Tim Hortons Field; Attendance: 4,824; Referee: Carly Shaw-MacLaren

August 26 22	Atlético Ottawa	0–0	Forge FC	Ottawa, Ontario
7:00 pm	Iliadis (yellow card) 49'; Verhoven (yellow card) 84'; Singh (yellow card) 90+3'	Report		Stadium: TD Place Stadium; Attendance: 5,211; Referee: Yusri Rudolf

September 3 23	Vancouver FC	0–3	Forge FC	Langley, British Columbia
5:00 pm	Cantave (yellow card) 51'; Bakare (yellow card) 73'	Report	Pacius 19', 28', 47' (pen.); Kwasi Poku (red card) 87'	Stadium: Willoughby Community Park; Attendance: 2,378; Referee: Alain Ruch

September 9 24	Forge FC	0–0	Cavalry FC	Hamilton, Ontario
7:00 pm		Report	Daley (yellow card) 38'; Field (yellow card) 48'	Stadium: Tim Hortons Field; Attendance: 6,751; Referee: Michael Venne

September 17 25	Valour FC	2–3	Forge FC	Winnipeg, Manitoba
2:00 pm	Williams 13'; de Brienne 57'; Pianelli (yellow card) 82'	Report	Sissoko 11'; Rama (yellow card) 27'; Kane (yellow card) 35'; Badibanga (yellow card) 59', (goal) 84'; Pacius 66', (yellow card) 88'	Stadium: IG Field; Attendance: 3,311; Referee: Fabrizio Stasolla

September 23 26	Forge FC	3–1	Pacific FC	Hamilton, Ontario
7:00 pm	Rama 5'; Hojabrpour (yellow card) 14'; Pacius 44'; Sissoko (yellow card) 45+10'; Hamilton 90+6'	Report	Daniels 3'; Heard (yellow card) 76'	Stadium: Tim Hortons Field; Attendance: 5,327; Referee: Yusri Rudolf

September 30 27	HFX Wanderers FC	2–1	Forge FC	Halifax, Nova Scotia
2:00 pm	Ferrin 12'; Nimick 45+2' (pen.); Coimbra (yellow card) 58'; Timoteo (yellow card) 68'; Loughrey (yellow card) 90+3'	Report	Pacius 34'; Sissoko (yellow card) 37'; Hojabrpour (yellow card) 41'; Bekker (yellow card) 85'; Rama (yellow card) 87'	Stadium: Wanderers Grounds; Attendance: 6,254; Referee: Michael Venne

October 7 28	Forge FC	0–1	Atlético Ottawa	Hamilton, Ontario
5:00 pm	Pacius (yellow card) 28'; James (yellow card) 32'; Achinioti-Jönsson (yellow card) 43'	Report	Iliadis (yellow card) 43', (goal) 54'; Ouimette (yellow card) 74'; Verhoven (yellow card) 81'	Stadium: Tim Hortons Field; Attendance: 6,013; Referee: Scott Bowman
Note: This match was originally scheduled for 4:00 pm.

==== Playoff matches ====
Forge qualified for the CPL playoffs on September 23. As the second-place finishers in the regular season, they opened the playoffs away at regular season winners Cavalry FC on October 14 in the Page playoff first semifinal. After defeating Cavalry 2–1 and earning the right to host the final in Hamilton at Tim Hortons Field, the league announced that the final would be played on October 28 at 6:00 pm.

October 14 First semifinal	Cavalry FC	1–2	Forge FC	Foothills County, Alberta
5:00 pm	Camargo (yellow card) 26'; Mason 80'; Kamdem (yellow card) 90+10'	Report	James (yellow card) 20'; Hojabrpour 29', (yellow card) 57'; Bekker 50'; Rama (yellow card) 90+1'; Sissoko (yellow card) 90+10'	Stadium: ATCO Field; Attendance: 4,385; Referee: Scott Bowman

October 28 Final	Forge FC	2–1 (a.e.t.)	Cavalry FC	Hamilton, Ontario
6:00 pm	James (yellow card) 14'; Samuel (yellow card) 105'; Badibanga 105+2'; Borges (yellow card) 105+5', (goal) 111'; Henry (yellow card) 120+4'	Report	Camargo (yellow card) 30'; Bevan (yellow card) 40'; Daley (yellow card) 57'; Trafford (yellow card) 72'; Musse 101'; Kamdem (yellow card) 105+5'	Stadium: Tim Hortons Field; Attendance: 13,925; Referee: Marie-Soleil Beaudoin

=== Canadian Championship ===
Canada Soccer announced the draw procedure for the Canadian Championship on January 17, 2023; the draw was held on January 31. Fixtures were announced on February 7 for the preliminary round, April 21 for the quarter-finals, and May 11 for the semi-finals.

April 18 Preliminary round	Forge FC	3–0	FC Laval	Hamilton, Ontario
7:00 pm	Jensen 37', 55'; Pacius 57' (pen.), (yellow card) 69'	Report	Lefèvre (yellow card) 54'; Gouab (yellow card) 56'	Stadium: Tim Hortons Field; Attendance: 2,117; Referee: Scott Bowman

May 9 Quarter-finals	Forge FC	1–1 (3–2 p)	Atlético Ottawa	Hamilton, Ontario
7:00 pm	Hojabrpour (yellow card) 55'; Bekker 76'; James (yellow card) 86'; Rama (yellow card) 90+7'	Report	Verhoeven (yellow card) 83'; Bassett 87' (pen.); dos Santos (yellow card) 90'	Stadium: Tim Hortons Field; Attendance: 2,979; Referee: Filip Dujic
	Penalties
	Borges (penalty missed); Jensen (penalty scored); Pacius (penalty missed); Achinioti-Jönsson (penalty scored); Hamilton (penalty missed); Sissoko (penalty scored)		(penalty missed) Shaw; (penalty missed) Bassett; (penalty missed) Salter; (penalty scored) Santos; (penalty scored) Singh; (penalty missed) Verhoven
Note: Although Atlético Ottawa was drawn as the home team, this match was played in Hamilton due to Atlético opting out of hosting.

May 24 Semi-finals	CF Montréal	2–0	Forge FC	Montreal, Quebec
7:00 pm	Lassiter 54'; Ibrahim 78'	Report		Stadium: Saputo Stadium; Attendance: 10,062; Referee: Pierre-Luc Lauziere

== Statistics ==
As of October 28, 2023

=== Squad and statistics ===
No.	Pos	Nat	Player	Total		Canadian Premier League		CPL Playoffs		Canadian Championship	
No.	Pos	Nat	Player	Apps	Goals	Apps	Goals	Apps	Goals	Apps	Goals
1	GK	(Canada) CAN	Triston Henry	32	0	27+0	0	2+0	0	3+0	0
2	DF	(Canada) CAN	Malcolm Duncan	9	0	2+7	0	0+0	0	0+0	0
4	DF	(Canada) CAN	Dominic Samuel	24	0	12+7	0	0+2	0	1+2	0
5	DF	(Canada) CAN	Manjrekar James	31	0	26+0	0	2+0	0	3+0	0
7	FW	(Canada) CAN	David Choinière	19	2	11+4	2	0+2	0	2+0	0
9	FW	(Canada) CAN	Jordan Hamilton	22	4	7+10	4	0+2	0	0+3	0
10	MF	(Canada) CAN	Kyle Bekker	30	5	24+2	3	2+0	1	2+0	1
12	MF	(Canada) CAN	Sebastian Castello	2	0	0+2	0	0+0	0	0+0	0
13	MF	(Sweden) SWE	Alexander Achinioti-Jönsson	32	0	24+3	0	2+0	0	3+0	0
14	FW	(Canada) CAN	Terran Campbell	33	10	24+4	10	2+0	0	2+1	0
17	FW	(Canada) CAN	Woobens Pacius	31	11	15+13	10	0+0	0	3+0	1
19	FW	(Canada) CAN	Tristan Borges	28	2	11+13	1	0+1	1	3+0	0
20	MF	(Canada) CAN	Kwasi Poku	24	2	16+5	2	2+0	0	0+1	0
21	MF	(Canada) CAN	Alessandro Hojabrpour	26	1	16+5	0	2+0	1	2+1	0
22	MF	(Canada) CAN	Noah Jensen	24	3	10+9	1	2+0	0	1+2	2
23	DF	(Haiti) HAI	Garven Metusala	21	0	14+3	0	2+0	0	1+1	0
24	DF	(Albania) ALB	Rezart Rama	30	1	25+1	1	2+0	0	2+0	0
29	GK	(Canada) CAN	Christopher Kalongo	2	0	1+1	0	0+0	0	0+0	0
33	MF	(Mali) MLI	Aboubacar Sissoko	30	2	16+9	2	0+2	0	2+1	0
37	FW	(Canada) CAN	Kevaughn Tavernier	2	0	1+1	0	0+0	0	0+0	0
39	FW	(Belgium) BEL	Béni Badibanga	12	3	9+1	2	2+0	1	0+0	0
64	MF	(Canada) CAN	Khadim Kane	15	0	6+9	0	0+0	0	0+0	0
81	DF	(England) ENG	Malik Owolabi-Belewu	19	0	9+7	0	0+2	0	0+1	0
Player(s) transferred out during this season
3	DF	(Canada) CAN	Ashtone Morgan	14	0	2+9	0	0+0	0	3+0	0

=== Goal scorers ===
Woobens Pacius and Terran Campbell ended the CPL season with 10 goals each, tied for third in the league's scoring race and one back of joint Golden Boot winners Ollie Bassett and Myer Bevan who each scored 11 goals.

Rank	Nat.	Player	Pos.	Canadian Premier League	CPL Playoffs	Canadian Championship	TOTAL
1	(Canada)	Woobens Pacius	FW	10	0	1	11
2	(Canada)	Terran Campbell	FW	10	0	0	10
3	(Canada)	Kyle Bekker	MF	3	1	1	5
4	(Canada)	Jordan Hamilton	FW	4	0	0	4
5	(Belgium)	Béni Badibanga	FW	2	1	0	3
5	(Canada)	Noah Jensen	MF	1	0	2	3
6	(Canada)	Tristan Borges	FW	1	1	0	2
6	(Canada)	David Choinière	MF	2	0	0	2
6	(Canada)	Kwasi Poku	MF	2	0	0	2
6	(Mali)	Aboubacar Sissoko	MF	2	0	0	2
10	(Canada)	Alessandro Hojabrpour	MF	0	1	0	1
10	(Albania)	Rezart Rama	DF	1	0	0	1
Own goals				1	0	0	1
Totals				39	4	4	47

=== Clean sheets ===
Rank	Nat.	Player	Canadian Premier League	CPL Playoffs	Canadian Championship	TOTAL
1	(Canada)	Triston Henry	9	0	1	10
2	(Canada)	Christopher Kalongo	1	0	0	1
Totals			10	0	1	11

=== Disciplinary record ===
No.	Pos.	Nat.	Player	Canadian Premier League		CPL Playoffs		Canadian Championship		TOTAL	
No.	Pos.	Nat.	Player	Yellow card	Red card	Yellow card	Red card	Yellow card	Red card	Yellow card	Red card
1	GK	(Canada)	Triston Henry	4	0	1	0	0	0	5	0
2	DF	(Canada)	Malcolm Duncan	1	0	0	0	0	0	1	0
3	DF	(Canada)	Ashtone Morgan	3	0	0	0	0	0	3	0
4	DF	(Canada)	Dominic Samuel	4	0	1	0	0	0	5	0
5	DF	(Canada)	Manjrekar James	3	0	2	0	1	0	6	0
7	FW	(Canada)	David Choinière	1	0	0	0	0	0	1	0
10	MF	(Canada)	Kyle Bekker	2	0	0	0	0	0	2	0
13	MF	(Sweden)	Alexander Achinioti-Jönsson	2	0	0	0	0	0	2	0
17	FW	(Canada)	Woobens Pacius	5	0	0	0	1	0	6	0
19	FW	(Canada)	Tristan Borges	2	0	1	0	0	0	3	0
20	MF	(Canada)	Kwasi Poku	2	1	0	0	1	0	3	1
21	MF	(Canada)	Alessandro Hojabrpour	3	0	1	0	0	0	4	0
22	MF	(Canada)	Noah Jensen	2	0	0	0	0	0	2	0
23	DF	(Haiti)	Garven Metusala	2	0	0	0	0	0	2	0
24	DF	(Albania)	Rezart Rama	7	0	1	0	1	0	9	0
33	MF	(Mali)	Aboubacar Sissoko	5	0	1	0	0	0	6	0
39	FW	(Belgium)	Béni Badibanga	2	0	0	0	0	0	2	0
64	MF	(Canada)	Khadim Kane	2	0	0	0	0	0	2	0
81	DF	(England)	Malik Owolabi-Belewu	5	0	0	0	0	0	5	0
Totals				57	1	8	0	4	0	69	1

=== Hat-tricks ===
Player	Against	Result	Date	Ref
(Canada) Terran Campbell	York United FC	4–0 (A)	July 9, 2023	
(Canada) Woobens Pacius	Vancouver FC	3–0 (A)	September 3, 2023	

== Honours ==
=== Canadian Premier League Awards ===
The Canadian Premier League Awards took place on October 26 in Hamilton.

Name	Award	Status	Source
Kyle Bekker	Player of the Year	Nominated	
Kyle Bekker	Player's Player of the Year	Nominated	
Terran Campbell	Player's Player of the Year	Nominated	
Triston Henry	Golden Glove	Won	
Manjrekar James	Defender of the Year	Nominated	
Kwasi Poku	Best Canadian U-21 Player	Nominated	
Bobby Smyrniotis	Coach of the Year	Nominated	

==== Canadian Premier League Best XI ====
Name	Source
Béni Badibanga; Terran Campbell; Kyle Bekker; Triston Henry; Manjrekar James	

==== Monthly Awards ====
Month	Name	Award	Source
April	Bobby Smyrniotis	Manager of the Month	
May	Triston Henry	Goalkeeper of the Month	
July	Kyle Bekker	Player of the Month	
July	Triston Henry	Goalkeeper of the Month	
October	Triston Henry	Goalkeeper of the Month	
October	Bobby Smyrniotis	Manager of the Month	

==== Player of the Week ====
Week	Name	Source
3	Manjrekar James	
7	Triston Henry	
13	Terran Campbell	
21	Woobens Pacius	
24	Kwasi Poku	

==== Team of the Week ====
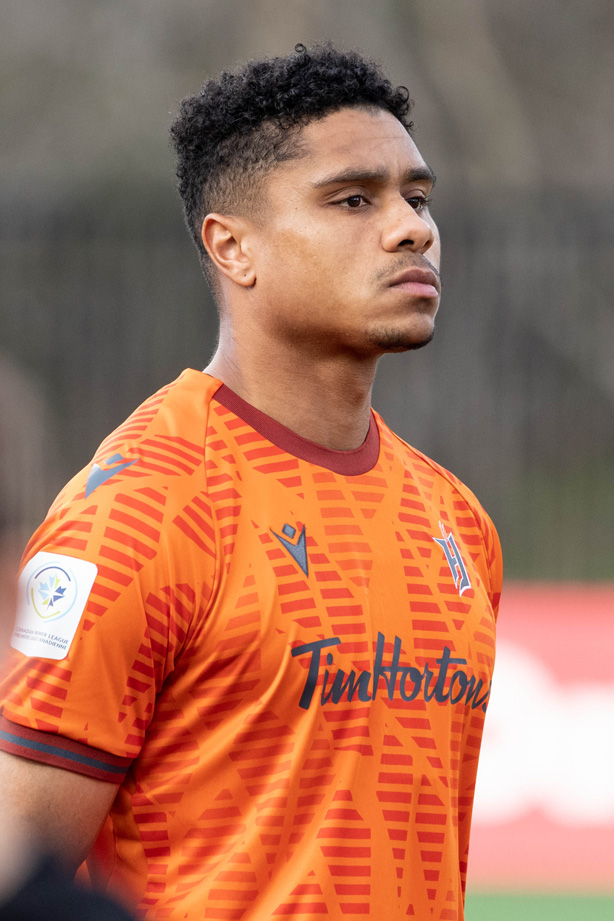
Terran Campbell has been named to four CPL Teams of the Week in 2023.

The Gatorade Team of the Week is usually selected by the CPL's Kristian Jack and OneSoccer's Oliver Platt.

Week	Name	Source
1	Noah Jensen	
3	Manjrekar James; Ashtone Morgan; Aboubacar Sissoko	
4	Tristan Borges; Terran Campbell; Triston Henry	
5	Jordan Hamilton	
7	Triston Henry (2)	
8	Kyle Bekker	
11	Terran Campbell (2)	
12	Kyle Bekker (2)	
13	Kyle Bekker (3); Tristan Borges (2); Terran Campbell (3); Triston Henry (3)	
14	Kyle Bekker (4); Terran Campbell (4)	
15	Kyle Bekker (5); David Choinière; Triston Henry (4); Manjrekar James (2)	
16	Kyle Bekker (6); Triston Henry (5); Ashtone Morgan (2)	
18	Kyle Bekker (7)	
19	Béni Badibanga	
20	Alexander Achinioti-Jönsson	
21	Alexander Achinioti-Jönsson (2); Woobens Pacius	
23	Béni Badibanga (2)	
24	Woobens Pacius (2); Kwasi Poku; Rezart Rama	
25	Rezart Rama (2)	

== Milestones ==
=== Manager ===
==== 150th game in charge ====
Bobby Smyrniotis managed his 150th game in charge of Forge FC on September 9, 2023.

Date	Manager	Final score	Opponent	Ref.
September 9	(Canada) Bobby Smyrniotis	0–0 (H)	Cavalry FC	

=== Players ===
==== Debuts ====
The following players made their competitive debuts for Forge during the 2023 season.

Date	No.	Pos.	Player	Final score	Opponent	Notes	Ref.
April 15	5	DF	(Canada) Manjrekar James	2–2 (H)	Cavalry FC		
May 5	64	MF	(Canada) Khadim Kane	2–1 (A)	York United FC	First professional match	
August 4	39	FW	(Belgium) Béni Badibanga	0–3 (A)	Cavalry FC		
September 9	37	FW	(Canada) Kevaughn Tavernier	0–0 (H)	Cavalry FC	First professional match	

==== 100th appearances ====
The following players made their 100th appearance for Forge during the 2023 season.

Date	No.	Pos.	Player	Final score	Opponent	Ref.
April 18	19	FW	(Canada) Tristan Borges	3–0 (H)	FC Laval	

==== First goals ====
The following players scored their first goals for Forge during the 2023 season.

Date	No.	Pos.	Player	Final score	Opponent	Ref.
August 19	39	FW	(Belgium) Béni Badibanga	1–1 (H)	HFX Wanderers FC	
September 23	24	DF	(Albania) Rezart Rama	3–1 (H)	Pacific FC	

==== First clean sheets ====
The following goalkeepers kept their first clean sheets for Forge during the 2023 season.

Date	No.	Pos.	Player	Final score	Opponent	Ref.
May 19	29	GK	(Canada) Christopher Kalongo	0–0 (H)	Vancouver FC	

== Sources ==
- Tierney, Mitchell (December 29, 2023). "CPL5x5: Forge FC 2023 year in review". Canadian Premier League. Archived from the original on December 30, 2023.
- Urciuoli, Anthony (host) (November 1, 2023). Season in Review - Forge FC. Forge FC – via YouTube.
- Wheeler, Gareth (host) (December 28, 2023). Forge FC: 2023 Year in Review. OneSoccer – via YouTube.
