= Malcolm Duncan =

Malcolm Duncan is the name of:

- Malcolm C. Duncan, named author of an 1866 American exposé of Freemasonry
- Malcolm Duncan (1881-1942), American stage actor
- Malcolm Duncan (soccer) (born 1999), Canadian soccer player
- Malcolm Duncan (musician) (1945–2019), Scottish saxophonist
- Mal Duncan, DC Comics character
