= Khadim Kane =

Canadian soccer player (born 2005)

Personal information
- Date of birth: May 17, 2005 (age 21)
- Place of birth: Mbacké, Senegal
- Height: 6 ft 3 in (1.91 m)
- Position: Midfielder

Team information
- Current team: Forge FC
- Number: 16

Youth career
- FSS Salabery
- CF Montréal

Senior career*
Years	Team	Apps	(Gls)
2022	CF Montréal U23	8	(1)
2023–	Forge FC	38	(1)
2023–2024	→ Sigma FC (loan)	8	(1)

International career^{‡}
2024	Canada U20	2	(0)
- * Club domestic league appearances and goals as of November 3, 2025 ‡ National team caps and goals as of 30 July 2024

Khadim Kane (born May 17, 2005) is a footballer who plays for Forge FC in the Canadian Premier League. Born in Senegal, Kane represents Canada at youth international level.

== Early life ==
Kane was born in Senegal, before moving to St. Laurent, Quebec, Canada. He played youth soccer with FSS Salabery, later joining the CF Montreal Academy.

== Club career ==
In 2022, he played with CF Montréal U23 in the Première ligue de soccer du Québec.

In 2023, he signed a two-year contract with Canadian Premier League club Forge FC, at the age of seventeen. His contract was later designated as an Exceptional Young Talent contract, under the CPL roster regulations. He also spent some time on loan with Sigma, who served as Forge's affiliate club. He made his professional debut for Forge on May 5, 2023, coming on as a substitute against York United FC. On June 20, he earned his first start, in a match against Vancouver FC. In October of the same year, he was a part of the Forge squad that won their fourth league title, following a 2–1 victory over Cavalry FC in the play-off final. On April 12, 2025, he scored his first professional goal in a 2-0 victory over Pacific FC.

== International career ==
In June 2024, Kane received his first call up to the Canadian U20 side for a camp in Chile. In July 2024, he was named to the team for the 2024 CONCACAF U-20 Championship.

== Personal life ==
He is the younger brother of fellow professional player Mamadou Kane.

== Career statistics ==
As of November 3, 2025

Club	Season	League			Playoffs		National Cup		Continental		Total	
Club	Season	Division	Apps	Goals	Apps	Goals	Apps	Goals	Apps	Goals	Apps	Goals
CF Montréal U23	2022	Première ligue de soccer du Québec	8	1	—		—		—		8	1
Forge FC	2023	Canadian Premier League	16	0	0	0	0	0	—		16	0
Forge FC	2024	Canadian Premier League	8	0	1	0	2	0	1	0	12	0
Forge FC	2025	Canadian Premier League	14	1	0	0	3	0	2	0	19	1
Forge FC	Total		38	1	1	0	5	0	3	0	47	1
Sigma FC (loan)	2023	League1 Ontario	2	0	0	0	—		—		2	0
Sigma FC (loan)	2024	League1 Ontario Premier	6	1	—		—		—		6	1
Sigma FC (loan)	Total		8	1	0	0	0	0	0	0	8	1
Career total			54	3	1	0	5	0	3	0	63	3
