= Kwasi Poku =

Canadian soccer player (born 2003)

Personal information
- Date of birth: February 6, 2003 (age 23)
- Place of birth: Brampton, Ontario, Canada
- Height: 1.91 m (6 ft 3 in)
- Positions: Striker; left back

Team information
- Current team: Vancouver Whitecaps FC
- Number: 22

Youth career
- Brampton East SC
- Woodbridge Strikers
- 2018: Unionville Milliken SC
- 2019–2022: Toronto FC

Senior career*
Years	Team	Apps	(Gls)
2021	Toronto FC III	4	(0)
2021	Toronto FC II	1	(0)
2022–2024	Forge FC	60	(11)
2023	→ Sigma FC (loan)	1	(0)
2024–2026	RWD Molenbeek	28	(5)
2026–	Vancouver Whitecaps FC	1	(0)

International career^{‡}
2022	Canada U20	5	(0)
2024–	Canada	1	(0)
- * Club domestic league appearances and goals as of November 1, 2026 ‡ National team caps and goals as of October 15, 2024

Kwasi Poku (born February 6, 2003) is a Canadian professional soccer player who currently plays for Major League Soccer club Vancouver Whitecaps FC and the Canadian national team.

== Early life ==
Poku began playing youth soccer at age six with Brampton East SC. He later played youth soccer with the Woodbridge Strikers, with whom he won the 2017 U14 Ontario Indoor Cup, scoring a hat-trick against Ottawa St. Anthony. He was also part of the provincial Team Ontario that year. He later played for Unionville Milliken SC for about six months, before joining the Toronto FC Academy, after impressing in a match against TFC while with Unionville in November 2018 and being invited for a tryout. He departed the Toronto FC Academy in February 2022.

== Club career ==
=== Toronto FC ===
In 2021, he played with Toronto FC III in the League1 Ontario Summer Championship division making his debut on July 31 against Alliance United. After the season, he joined the second team Toronto FC II in USL League One. He made his debut on October 1, 2021, against North Carolina FC. In February 2022, he departed the Toronto FC organization.

=== Forge FC ===
In February 2022, he signed a professional contract with Canadian Premier League side Forge FC. He made his debut for his new club on February 16 in a 2022 CONCACAF Champions League match against Cruz Azul. Poku scored his first goal on October 9, 2022, in a 1–0 victory over the HFX Wanderers.

In January 2023, Poku went on trial with Swedish Allsvenskan club BK Häcken. In 2023, he played one game on loan with Forge's affiliate Sigma FC in League1 Ontario. In later September 2023, he was named the CPL player of the week. At the end of the 2023 season, he was nominated for the CPL U21 Player of the Year award. In October of the same year, he helped Forge win their fourth league title, following a 2–1 win over Cavalry FC in the play-off final.

During the 2024 season, he was moved from his typical left-back position to centre forward, after several injuries to the team's forwards. On June 23, 2024, he scored a brace in a 2–1 victory over Valour FC. He was named the league's Player of the Month for June 2024. On July 10, he scored a backheel goal against Major League Soccer club Toronto FC in a 2–1 victory in the first leg of the 2024 Canadian Championship semi-finals. On July 14, he scored another brace in a 2–1 victory over Pacific FC, earning league Player of the Week honours. In August 2024, he began to be held out of matches for precautionary reasons, amid transfer interest from foreign clubs. At the end of the 2024 season (even though he had already departed the club), he was named the Canadian Premier League's Best Canadian Under-21 Player Award.

=== RWD Molenbeek ===
On August 21, 2024, Poku transferred to RWD Molenbeek of the Challenger Pro League for an undisclosed CPL-record transfer fee. He made his debut on August 23 against Eupen. On September 21, he scored his first goals for the club, netting a brace in a 3–0 victory over Jong Genk. In January 2025, he underwent surgery for a hip injury, forcing him to miss the remainder of the season.

=== Vancouver Whitecaps ===
On July 30, 2026, Poku transferred to Major League Soccer side Vancouver Whitecaps FC for an undisclosed amount. His contract runs through the 2027-28 season with a club option for 2028-29.

== International career ==
Born in Canada, Poku is of Ghanaian descent. In April 2022, he was called up to the Canadian Under-20 team for two matches against Costa Rica. In June 2022, he was named to the Canadian U-20 team for the 2022 CONCACAF U-20 Championship. He appeared in all four of the team's matches, playing a total of 385 minutes, prior to their elimination in the round of 16.

In October 2024, Poku was called up to the Canadian senior national team for the first time, for a friendly match against Panama. He made his debut in that match, in a substitute appearance, on October 15.

== Career statistics ==
As of November 1, 2026

Appearances and goals by club, season and competition
Club	Season	League			Playoffs		Domestic Cup		Continental		Total	
Club	Season	Division	Apps	Goals	Apps	Goals	Apps	Goals	Apps	Goals	Apps	Goals
Toronto FC III	2021	League1 Ontario Summer Championship	4	0	—		—		—		4	0
Toronto FC II	2021	USL League One	1	0	—		—		—		1	0
Forge FC	2022	Canadian Premier League	20	1	1	0	3 (Note: Includes appearance in the 2020 Canadian Championship final (played in 2022))	0	2	0	26	1
Forge FC	2023	Canadian Premier League	23	2	2	0	1	0	—		26	2
Forge FC	2024	Canadian Premier League	17	8	0	0	4	2	1	0	22	10
Forge FC	Total		60	11	3	0	8	2	3	0	74	13
Sigma FC (loan)	2023	League1 Ontario	1	0	—		—		—		1	0
RWDM	2024–25	Challenger Pro League	14	3	—		2	1	—		16	4
RWDM	2025–26	Challenger Pro League	14	2	—		1	0	—		15	2
RWDM	Total		28	5	0	0	3	1	0	0	31	6
Vancouver Whitecaps FC	2026	MLS	1	0	0	0	0	0	0	1	0	
Career total			95	16	3	0	11	4	3	0	112	19

=== International ===
As of match played October 15, 2024

Appearances and goals by national team and year
National team	Year	Apps	Goals
Canada	2024	1	0
Total		1	0
