= Canadian Premier League records and statistics =

The following is a compilation of notable Canadian Premier League records and statistics for clubs and players. The Canadian Premier League includes statistics from the CPL Finals in their season totals.

== Champions ==
| Team | Titles | Runners-up | Seasons won | Seasons runner-up |
|---|---|---|---|---|
| Forge FC | 4 | 2 | 2019, 2020, 2022, 2023 | 2021, 2024 |
| Cavalry FC | 1 | 3 | 2024 | 2019, 2023, 2025 |
| Atlético Ottawa | 1 | 1 | 2025 | 2022 |
| Pacific FC | 1 | 0 | 2021 | |
| HFX Wanderers FC | 0 | 1 | | 2020 |

== Player records ==
=== Career ===
Statistics below are for all-time leaders and include regular season and playoffs. Goal contributions is the sum of goals and assists. Bold indicates active players. Team is the current team or for inactive players the last CPL team they played for. Flag indicates their country status as per CPL regulations. Current to October 25, 2026.

==== Goals ====
| Rank | Player | Team | Years | Goals |
|---|---|---|---|---|
| 1 | (Mexico) **Alejandro Díaz** | Pacific FC | 2020–2022, 2023–present | 50 |
| 2 | (Canada) **Terran Campbell** | Vancouver FC | 2019–present | 49 |
| 3 | (Germany) **Tobias Warschewski** | Cavalry FC | 2021–2022, 2024–present | 47 |
| 4 | (Canada) Samuel Salter | Atlético Ottawa | 2021–2025 | 46 |
| 5 | (Canada) **Brian Wright** | Forge FC | 2021–present | 40 |
| 6 | (Canada) **Tristan Borges** | Forge FC | 2019, 2021–present | 39 |
| 6 | (Somalia) **Ali Musse** | Cavalry FC | 2019, 2021–present | 39 |
| 8 | (Canada) **Sergio Camargo** | Cavalry FC | 2019–present | 34 |
| 9 | (Canada) **Marco Bustos** | Pacific FC | 2019–2022, 2025–present | 31 |
| 9 | (Canada) **Ballou Tabla** | Atlético Ottawa | 2022,2024–present | 31 |

==== Assists ====
| Rank | Player | Team | Years | Assists |
|---|---|---|---|---|
| 1 | (Canada) **Tristan Borges** | Forge FC | 2019, 2021–present | 36 |
| 2 | (Canada) Kyle Bekker | Forge FC | 2019–2026 | 31 |
| 3 | (Germany) **Tobias Warschewski** | Cavalry FC | 2021–2022, 2024–present | 29 |
| 4 | (Somalia) **Ali Musse** | Cavalry FC | 2019, 2021–present | 28 |
| 5 | (Canada) **Marco Bustos** | Pacific FC | 2019–2022, 2025–present | 26 |
| 6 | (Canada) **Manny Aparicio** | Atlético Ottawa | 2019–present | 25 |
| 7 | (Canada) **David Choinière** | Supra du Québec | 2019–present | 24 |
| 7 | (Canada) **Sean Rea** | Supra du Québec | 2021–2022, 2024–present | 24 |
| 9 | (Canada) **Sergio Camargo** | Cavalry FC | 2019–present | 19 |
| 10 | (Canada) **Max Ferrari** | Inter Toronto | 2020–present | 17 |

==== Goal contributions ====
| Rank | Player | Team | Years | G+A |
|---|---|---|---|---|
| 1 | (Germany) **Tobias Warschewski** | Cavalry FC | 2021–2022, 2024–present | 76 |
| 2 | (Canada) **Tristan Borges** | Forge FC | 2019, 2021–present | 75 |
| 3 | (Somalia) **Ali Musse** | Cavalry FC | 2019, 2021–present | 67 |
| 4 | (Canada) **Terran Campbell** | Vancouver FC | 2019–present | 65 |
| 5 | (Mexico) **Alejandro Díaz** | Pacific FC | 2020–2022, 2023–present | 64 |
| 6 | (Canada) **Marco Bustos** | Pacific FC | 2019–2022, 2025–present | 57 |
| 7 | (Canada) Samuel Salter | Atlético Ottawa | 2021–2025 | 54 |
| 8 | (Canada) Kyle Bekker | Forge FC | 2019–2026 | 53 |
| 8 | (Canada) **Sergio Camargo** | Cavalry FC | 2019–present | 53 |
| 10 | (Canada) **Brian Wright** | Forge FC | 2021–present | 52 |

==== Clean sheets ====
| Rank | Player | Team | Years | Clean sheets |
|---|---|---|---|---|
| 1 | (Canada) **Marco Carducci** | HFX Wanderers | 2019–present | 59 |
| 2 | (Canada) **Nathan Ingham** | Cavalry FC | 2019–present | 58 |
| 3 | (Canada) Triston Henry | Forge FC | 2019–2023 | 42 |
| 4 | (Canada) **Callum Irving** | Vancouver FC | 2020–present | 32 |
| 5 | (Czech Republic) Jassem Koleilat | Forge FC | 2024–2025 | 21 |
| 5 | (Canada) Rayane Yesli | HFX Wanderers | 2022–2025 | 21 |
| 7 | (Canada) Christian Oxner | HFX Wanderers | 2019–2022 | 17 |
| 8 | (Canada) Niko Giantsopoulos | Vancouver FC | 2019–2024 | 14 |
| 8 | (Canada) Jonathan Sirois | Valour FC | 2021–2022 | 14 |
| 10 | (Canada) Emil Gazdov | Valour FC | 2022–2024,2025 | 13 |

==== Appearances ====
| Rank | Player | Team | Years | Appearances |
|---|---|---|---|---|
| 1 | (Canada) **Marco Carducci** | HFX Wanderers | 2019–present | 202 |
| 2 | (Canada) Kyle Bekker | Forge FC | 2019–2026 | 194 |
| 3 | (Canada) **Manny Aparicio** | Atlético Ottawa | 2019–present | 186 |
| 4 | (Canada) **Nathan Ingham** | Cavalry FC | 2019–present | 184 |
| 5 | (Sweden) Alexander Achinioti-Jönsson | Forge FC | 2019–2025 | 183 |
| 5 | (Canada) **Terran Campbell** | Vancouver FC | 2019–present | 183 |
| 7 | (Canada) **Tristan Borges** | Forge FC | 2019, 2021–present | 181 |
| 8 | (Canada) **David Choinière** | Supra du Québec | 2019–present | 176 |
| 9 | (Trinidad and Tobago) **Andre Rampersad** | HFX Wanderers | 2019–present | 169 |
| 10 | (Canada) **Callum Irving** | Vancouver FC | 2020–present | 167 |

=== Single season ===
Totals include regular season and playoffs.

==== Goals ====
| Rank | Player | Team | Season | Goals |
|---|---|---|---|---|
| 1 | (Canada) Samuel Salter | Atlético Ottawa | 2025 | 20 |
| 2 | (Brazil) João Morelli | HFX Wanderers FC | 2021 | 14 |
| 2 | (Germany) Tobias Warschewski | Cavalry FC | 2024 | 14 |
| 4 | (Canada) Tristan Borges | Forge FC | 2019 | 13 |
| 4 | (Mexico) Alejandro Díaz | Pacific FC | 2022 | 13 |
| 4 | (Canada) Tiago Coimbra | Halifax Wanderers FC | 2025 | 13 |
| 7 | (Canada) Easton Ongaro | FC Edmonton | 2021 | 12 |
| 7 | (Canada) Osaze De Rosario | York United FC | 2022 | 12 |
| 7 | (Canada) Woobens Pacius | Forge FC | 2022 | 12 |
| 7 | (Switzerland) Rubén del Campo | Atlético Ottawa | 2024 | 12 |
| 7 | (Canada) Brian Wright | Forge FC | 2025 | 12 |

=== Single game ===
==== Goals ====
| Player | Goals | For | Against | Result | Venue | Date | Ref. |
|---|---|---|---|---|---|---|---|
| (Canada) Samuel Salter | 4 | Atlético Ottawa | Valour FC | 5–2 | Home | May 10, 2025 | |
| (Canada) Shaan Hundal | 4 | York United FC | Pacific FC | 5–1 | Home | August 24, 2025 | |
| (Chile) Rodrigo Gattas | 3 | York9 | HFX Wanderers | 6–2 | Home | July 27, 2019 | |
| (Mexico) Alejandro Díaz | 3 | Pacific FC | Atlético Ottawa | 4–2 | Neutral | July 22, 2021 | |
| (Canada) Tristan Borges | 3 | Forge FC | FC Edmonton | 4–3 | Away | May 31, 2022 | |
| (Mexico) Alejandro Díaz | 3 | Pacific FC | York United | 4–2 | Away | July 15, 2022 | |
| (Canada) Woobens Pacius | 3 | Forge FC | FC Edmonton | 5–1 | Home | July 19, 2022 | |
| (Canada) Terran Campbell | 3 | Forge FC | York United | 4–0 | Away | July 9, 2023 | |
| (Canada) Woobens Pacius | 3 | Forge FC | Vancouver FC | 3–0 | Away | September 3, 2023 | |
| (Canada) Brian Wright | 3 | Forge FC | Valour FC | 5–0 | Away | June 22, 2025 | |
| (Canada) Yann Toualy | 3 | Pacific FC | Valour FC | 3–2 | Home | July 12, 2025 | |
| (Canada) Tiago Coimbra | 3 | Halifax Wanderers FC | Valour FC | 4–1 | Home | August 22, 2025 | |
| (Canada) Myles Morgan | 3 | Valour FC | Vancouver FC | 5–2 | Away | September 5, 2025 | |
| (Canada) Mohamed Amissi | 3 | Vancouver FC | Inter Toronto | 4–0 | Home | July 4, 2026 | |
| (Canada) Loïc Kwemi | 3 | FC Supra du Québec | HFX Wanderers FC | 3–2 | Away | July 24, 2026 | |
| (Somalia) Ali Musse | 3 | Cavalry FC | FC Supra du Québec | 6–0 | Home | September 25, 2026 | |

== Club records ==
Games in a row streaks for games played during the regular season and playoffs. For the purpose of these streaks, penalty shoot-out wins are not credited and are considered simply as a draw. Bold indicates active streak. Current to July 28, 2026.

=== Winning streaks ===
| Rank | Wins | Team | Start date | End date | Opponents and scores |
|---|---|---|---|---|---|
| 1 | 7 | Cavalry FC | May 4, 2019 | June 19, 2019 | 2–1 v York9, 1–0 v Valour, 2–1 at Forge, 1–0 v Edmonton, 2–0 v HFX Wanderers, 3–0 at Edmonton, 2–1 at HFX Wanderers |
| 2 | 6 | Forge FC | July 8, 2022 | August 6, 2022 | 2–0 at York United, 5–1 v Edmonton, 3–1 v Valour, 2–1 at Cavalry, 4–0 at Atlético Ottawa, 1–0 v HFX Wanderers |
| 2 | 6 | Forge FC | July 18, 2025 | August 22, 2025 | 2–0 v Pacific, 2–1 v HFX Wanderers, 5–0 v Valour, 2–1 at York United, 2–0 v Atlético Ottawa, 1–0 at Vancouver |
| 2 | 6 | Forge FC | May 31, 2026 | August 2, 2026 | 1–0 v Cavalry, 4–1 at Inter Toronto, 1–0 v HFX Wanderers, 3–2 v Vancouver, 2–1 at Supra du Québec, 3–1 at Inter Toronto |
| 5 | 5 | Forge FC | May 16, 2019 | June 22, 2019 | 2–0 at Valour, 2–0 at York United, 2–0 v Edmonton, 2–1 v Valour, 1–0 at Cavalry |
| 5 | 5 | Pacific FC | November 20, 2021 | April 23, 2022 | 2–1 at Cavalry, 1–0 at Forge, 2–1 v Forge, 3–2 v Valour, 2–1 v HFX Wanderers |
| 5 | 5 | Cavalry FC | May 21, 2022 | June 26, 2022 | 2–1 v Valour, 1–0 at York United, 1–0 v HFX Wanderers, 4–2 at Valour, 3–1 v Edmonton |
| 5 | 5 | Pacific FC | July 9, 2022 | August 13, 2022 | 3–2 at Edmonton, 4–2 at York United, 3–0 v Cavalry, 2–1 at Valour, 1–0 v Atlético Ottawa |
| 5 | 5 | Cavalry FC | September 12, 2023 | October 7, 2023 | 2–1 at HFX Wanderers, 2–1 v Vancouver, 1–0 at York United, 2–1 v Valour, 3–0 v Pacific |
| 5 | 5 | Forge FC | October 14, 2023 | April 27, 2024 | 2–1 at Cavalry, 2–1 v Cavalry, 2–1 v Cavalry, 3–0 at York United, 2–1 v Valour |
| 5 | 5 | Cavalry FC | July 26, 2024 | August 24, 2024 | 1–0 at Vancouver, 2–1 at Atlético Ottawa, 3–2 v HFX Wanderers, 2–1 at York United, 1–0 v Pacific |
| 5 | 5 | Cavalry FC | October 5, 2024 | November 9, 2024 | 4–1 at Pacific, 2–1 v HFX Wanderers, 2–1 at Valour, 1–0 at Forge, 2–1 v Forge |
| 5 | 5 | Atlético Ottawa | April 13, 2025 | May 10, 2025 | 4–1 at Vancouver, 3–2 v York United, 3–1 v Cavalry, 3–1 v Pacific, 5–2 v Valour |
| 5 | 5 | Vancouver FC | July 4, 2026 | August 7, 2026 | 4–0 v Inter Toronto, 5–1 at Supra du Québec, 1–0 v Cavalry, 3–1 v Atlético Ottawa, 1–0 at Forge |

=== Unbeaten streaks ===
| Rank | Games Unbeaten | Team | Start date | End date | Opponents and scores |
|---|---|---|---|---|---|
| 1 | 20 | Forge FC | April 5, 2025 | August 22, 2025 | 1–0 v Cavalry, 2–0 at Pacific, 1–1 v Valour, 2–2 at York United, 0–0 at HFX Wanderers, 2–2 v Atlético Ottawa, 1–0 at Pacific, 1–1 v Cavalry, 2–1 v HFX Wanderers, 2–0 at Vancouver, 5–0 at Valour, 2–2 v York United, 2–1 v Vancouver, 1–1 at Atlético Ottawa, 2–0 v Pacific, 2–1 at HFX Wanderers, 5–0 v Valour, 2–1 at York United, 2–0 v Atlético Ottawa, 1–0 at Vancouver |
| 2 | 14 | Forge FC | July 13, 2019 | October 6, 2019 | 3–2 at Pacific, 2–0 v HFX Wanderers, 3–1 v Valour, 1–1 at Edmonton, 3–1 at Valour, 1–0 v Cavalry, 1–1 at Pacific, 2–1 v York9, 3–1 at Valour, 2–2 v HFX Wanderers, 1–1 at HFX Wanderers, 3–0 v Pacific, 1–0 at Edmonton, 1–0 v York9 |
| 3 | 11 | Cavalry FC | May 1, 2022 | July 14, 2022 | 2–0 v Pacific, 3–0 at Edmonton, 2–2 at HFX Wanderers, 2–1 v Valour, 1–0 at York United, 1–0 v HFX Wanderers, 4–2 at Valour, 3–1 v Edmonton, 3–3 at Pacific, 1–1 at Atlético Ottawa, 3–0 v HFX Wanderers |
| 3 | 11 | Atlético Ottawa | August 17, 2022 | October 23, 2022 | 3–2 v HFX Wanderers, 3–0 at Cavalry, 0–0 v Forge, 0–0 v Edmonton, 1–1 at Pacific, 1–1 at Valour, 3–1 at Cavalry, 2–1 at HFX Wanderers, 2–2 v York United, 2–0 at Pacific, 1–1 v Pacific |
| 3 | 11 | Forge FC | October 9, 2022 | May 27, 2023 | 1–0 v HFX Wanderers, 1–1 at Cavalry, 2–1 v Cavalry, 2–0 at Atlético Ottawa, 2–2 v Cavalry, 1–1 v HFX Wanderers, 1–0 at Pacific, 1–0 at York United, 3–2 v Valour, 0–0 v Vancouver, 1–0 at Atlético Ottawa |
| 3 | 11 | Atlético Ottawa | August 23, 2025 | November 9, 2025 | 2–2 v Cavalry, 3–1 v Vancouver, 2–0 v Pacific, 2–2 at York United, 1–1 v Forge, 3–0 v Cavalry, 3–3 at Valour, 0–0 v Vancouver, 1–0 at HFX Wanderers, 2–1 at Forge, 2–1 v Cavalry |
| 7 | 10 | HFX Wanderers FC | August 22, 2021 | October 3, 2021 | 1–1 at Forge, 1–1 at York United, 2–2 at Atlético Ottawa, 2–0 v Forge, 3–3 v York United, 2–1 at Atlético Ottawa, 0–0 at York United, 1–0 v Edmonton, 2–1 v Atlético Ottawa, 2–2 at York United |
| 7 | 10 | Atlético Ottawa | October 7, 2023 | June 9, 2024 | 1–0 at Forge, 2–1 v York United, 1–1 v Cavalry, 3–1 at HFX Wanderers, 2–0 v Valour, 1–1 at Vancouver, 1–0 at Pacific, 3–0 v Forge, 2–2 v HFX Wanderers, 2–0 at Valour |
| 7 | 10 | Atlético Ottawa | May 30, 2025 | August 10, 2025 | 2–2 at Vancouver, 1–0 at Pacific, 3–0 v Valour, 0–0 at York United, 2–0 at Cavalry, 1–1 v Forge, 2–0 v HFX Wanderers, 2–0 at Pacific, 0–0 v York United, 2–1 at Valour |
| 10 | 9 | Pacific FC | May 6, 2023 | June 30, 2023 | 4–1 at Atlético Ottawa, 4–1 v York United, 1–1 at Valour, 1–1 v HFX Wanderers, 6–3 at Vancouver, 1–0 at Forge, 1–0 v York United, 1–0 v Valour, 2–2 v Atlético Ottawa |
| 10 | 9 | Cavalry FC | August 20, 2023 | October 7, 2023 | 2–1 v York United, 1–0 v Pacific, 2–1 at Atlético Ottawa, 0–0 at Forge, 2–1 at HFX Wanderers, 2–1 v Vancouver, 1–0 at York United, 2–1 v Valour, 3–0 v Pacific |

=== Losing streaks ===
| Rank | Losses | Team | Start date | End date | Opponents and scores |
|---|---|---|---|---|---|
| 1 | 7 | Valour FC | September 29, 2023 | May 10, 2024 | 1–2 at Cavalry, 0–1 v HFX Wanderers, 1–4 at Vancouver, 0–2 at Pacific, 1–2 at Forge, 0–2 at Atlético Ottawa, 1–3 at York United |
| 2 | 5 | HFX Wanderers FC | July 13, 2019 | July 31, 2019 | 0–1 v Cavalry, 0–2 at Forge, 1–3 at Pacific, 2–6 at York9, 0–2 at Edmonton |
| 2 | 5 | FC Edmonton | August 26, 2020 | June 26, 2021 | 1–3 v HFX Wanderers, 1–2 at Valour, 0–1 v York9, 1–2 at Pacific, 0–1 v Atlético Ottawa |
| 2 | 5 | FC Edmonton | April 30, 2022 | May 31, 2022 | 1–3 at HFX Wanderers, 0–3 v Cavalry, 1–2 at Pacific, 1–2 v Atlético Ottawa, 3–4 v Forge |
| 2 | 5 | Valour FC | June 15, 2025 | July 20, 2025 | 0–3 at Atlético Ottawa, 0–5 v Forge, 1–3 at HFX Wanderers, 2–3 at York United, 1–2 v Cavalry |
| 2 | 5 | Vancouver FC | August 10, 2025 | September 5, 2025 | 3–4 v Pacific, 4–5 at Cavalry, 0–1 at Vancouver, 1–3 at Atlético Ottawa, 2–5 v Valour |
| 2 | 5 | Pacific FC | June 14, 2026 | July 31, 2026 | 1–2 at Vancouver, 2–5 at HFX Wanderers, 1–2 v HFX Wanderers, 2–3 at Atlético Ottawa, 1–2 v Supra du Québec |
| 7 | 4 | FC Edmonton | May 18, 2019 | June 15, 2019 | 0–1 at Cavalry, 0–2 at Forge, 0–1 v Valour, 0–3 v Cavalry |
| 7 | 4 | Valour FC | June 15, 2019 | July 1, 2019 | 1–2 at Forge, 1–2 v Pacific, 0–2 at HFX Wanderers, 1–3 v York9 |
| 7 | 4 | HFX Wanderers FC | September 15, 2020 | June 30, 2021 | 0–5 v Pacific, 0–2 at Forge, 0–2 at Pacific, 0–2 at Valour |
| 7 | 4 | Valour FC | July 24, 2021 | August 8, 2021 | 0–1 v HFX Wanderers, 1–3 at Edmonton, 1–2 at Pacific, 0–1 at Cavalry |
| 7 | 4 | York United FC | November 6, 2021 | April 7, 2022 | 1–2 v Forge, 1–3 v Forge, 1–3 at Forge, 0–1 v HFX Wanderers |
| 7 | 4 | York United FC | June 26, 2022 | July 15, 2022 | 1–3 v Valour, 0–3 at Edmonton, 0–2 v Forge, 2–4 v Pacific |
| 7 | 4 | HFX Wanderers FC | October 14, 2023 | April 27, 2024 | 0–1 v Pacific, 0–1 at Pacific, 0–2 at Vancouver, 1–3 v Atlético Ottawa |
| 7 | 4 | Pacific FC | August 11, 2024 | August 30, 2024 | 0–1 at Vancouver, 0–3 v Atlético Ottawa, 0–1 at Cavalry, 0–2 at Forge |
| 7 | 4 | Vancouver FC | August 31, 2024 | September 21, 2024 | 0–1 at Atlético Ottawa, 0–1 v York United, 0–3 at Pacific, 1–3 v Forge |
| 7 | 4 | HFX Wanderers FC | July 12, 2025 | August 4, 2025 | 2–3 at Pacific, 0–2 at Atlético Ottawa, 1–2 v Forge, 1–2 v Vancouver |
| 7 | 4 | Pacific FC | April 26, 2026 | May 24, 2026 | 0–1 v Forge, 1–3 v Vancouver, 0–1 v Inter Toronto, 0–3 at Cavalry |
| 7 | 4 | Inter Toronto | May 29, 2026 | July 4, 2026 | 1–3 at Supra du Québec, 1–4 v Forge, 1–5 v Cavalry, 0–4 at Vancouver |

=== Winless streaks ===
- **Pacific FC**, 27 matches (August 10, 2025 – August 30, 2026)

== Club statistics ==
=== All-time regular season table ===
The all-time regular season table is a cumulative record of all match results, points and goals of every team that has played in the Canadian Premier League since its inception in 2019, excluding playoffs.
As of 2025 season

| Pos. | Club | Seasons | Pld | Win | Draw | Loss | GF | GA | GD | Pts | PPG | 1st | 2nd | 3rd |
|---|---|---|---|---|---|---|---|---|---|---|---|---|---|---|
| 1 | Cavalry FC | 7 | 175 | 90 | 47 | 38 | 266 | 179 | 87 | 317 | 1.81 | 3 | 2 | 2 |
| 2 | Forge FC | 7 | 175 | 92 | 39 | 44 | 279 | 169 | 110 | 315 | 1.80 | 3 | 3 | 1 |
| 3 | Pacific FC | 7 | 175 | 62 | 44 | 69 | 227 | 247 | -20 | 230 | 1.31 | – | – | 1 |
| 4 | Inter Toronto FC | 7 | 175 | 60 | 49 | 66 | 226 | 228 | –2 | 229 | 1.31 | – | – | 1 |
| 5 | Atlético Ottawa | 6 | 147 | 57 | 48 | 51 | 207 | 181 | 26 | 219 | 1.49 | 1 | 1 | 1 |
| 6 | HFX Wanderers FC | 7 | 175 | 54 | 53 | 68 | 202 | 223 | –21 | 215 | 1.23 | – | 1 | 1 |
| 7 | Valour FC | 7 | 175 | 50 | 38 | 78 | 203 | 273 | –70 | 188 | 1.07 | – | – | – |
| 8 | FC Edmonton | 4 | 91 | 18 | 27 | 46 | 97 | 139 | –42 | 81 | 0.89 | – | – | – |
| 9 | Vancouver FC | 3 | 84 | 19 | 23 | 42 | 92 | 150 | –58 | 80 | 0.95 | – | – | – |

=== All-time regular season finishing positions ===
| Place | 2019 | 2020 | 2021 | 2022 | 2023 | 2024 | 2025 | 2026 |
|---|---|---|---|---|---|---|---|---|
| 1 | Cavalry FC | Cavalry FC | Forge FC | Atlético Ottawa | Cavalry FC | Forge FC | Forge FC | Cavalry FC |
| 2 | Forge FC | HFX Wanderers FC | Cavalry FC | Forge FC | Forge FC | Cavalry FC | Atlético Ottawa | Forge FC |
| 3 | York9 FC | Forge FC | Pacific FC | Cavalry FC | HFX Wanderers FC | Atlético Ottawa | Cavalry FC | Atlético Ottawa |
| 4 | FC Edmonton | Pacific FC | York United FC | Pacific FC | Pacific FC | York United FC | HFX Wanderers FC | FC Supra du Québec |
| 5 | Pacific FC | York9 FC | Valour FC | Valour FC | York United FC | Pacific FC | York United FC | Vancouver FC |
| 6 | Valour FC | Valour FC | HFX Wanderers FC | York United FC | Atlético Ottawa | HFX Wanderers FC | Valour FC | Inter Toronto FC |
| 7 | HFX Wanderers FC | Atlético Ottawa | FC Edmonton | HFX Wanderers FC | Vancouver FC | Vancouver FC | Pacific FC | HFX Wanderers |
| 8 | | FC Edmonton | Atlético Ottawa | FC Edmonton | Valour FC | Valour FC | Vancouver FC | Pacific FC |

=== All-time regular season points ===
By season
| Season | Winner | Pts | PPG | Playoff result |
|---|---|---|---|---|
| 2019 | Cavalry FC | 62 | 2.21 | Runner-up |
| 2020 | Conventional regular season not held | | | |
| 2021 | Forge FC | 50 | 1.79 | Runner-up |
| 2022 | Atlético Ottawa | 49 | 1.75 | Runner-up |
| 2023 | Cavalry FC | 55 | 1.96 | Runner-up |
| 2024 | Forge FC | 50 | 1.79 | Runner-up |
| 2025 | Forge FC | 58 | 2.07 | Second semifinal |
| 2026 | Cavalry FC | 60 | 2.14 | Winner |

=== Post-season active streaks ===
==== Playoff appearances ====
Updated through the 2026 Canadian Premier League season. This list includes the four clubs that made the post-season in 2026. For the purposes of this section, the four-team group stage in 2020 is considered to be part of the post-season.

| Club | Last miss of post-season | Length of streak |
|---|---|---|
| Cavalry FC | never (club joined in 2019) | 8 seasons |
| Forge FC | never (club joined in 2019) | 8 seasons |
| Atlético Ottawa | 2023 | 3 seasons |
| FC Supra du Québec | never (club joined in 2026) | 1 season |

==== Finals appearances ====
Updated through 2026 Canadian Premier League final. This list includes the two finalist clubs from 2026.

| Club | Last miss of finals | Length of streak |
|---|---|---|
| Cavalry FC | 2022 | 4 seasons |
| Atlético Ottawa | 2024 | 2 seasons |

=== Post-season active droughts ===
† – team is no longer playing in the Canadian Premier League.

==== Playoff appearances ====
Updated through the 2026 Canadian Premier League season. This list does not include clubs that made the postseason in that year. For the purposes of this section, the four-team group stage in 2020 is considered to be part of the post-season.

| Club | Last appearance in post-season | Length of drought |
|---|---|---|
| Valour FC † | never (club joined in 2019; folded after 2025) | 7 seasons |
| FC Edmonton † | never (club joined in 2019, folded after 2022) | 4 seasons |
| Vancouver FC | never (club joined in 2023) | 4 seasons |
| Pacific FC | 2024 | 2 seasons |
| HFX Wanderers FC | 2025 | 1 season |
| Inter Toronto FC | 2025 | 1 season |

==== Finals appearances ====
Updated through 2026 Canadian Premier League final. This list does not include the clubs that qualified in that year.

| Club | Last appearance in finals | Length of drought |
|---|---|---|
| Inter Toronto FC | never (club joined in 2019) | 8 seasons |
| Valour FC † | never (club joined in 2019; folded after 2025) | 7 seasons |
| FC Edmonton † | never (club joined in 2019, folded after 2022) | 4 seasons |
| HFX Wanderers FC | 2020 | 6 seasons |
| Pacific FC | 2021 | 5 seasons |
| Vancouver FC | never (club joined in 2023) | 4 seasons |
| Forge FC | 2024 | 2 seasons |

==== Championships ====
Updated through 2026 Canadian Premier League final. This list does not include the club that won the championship in that year.

| Club | Last championship | Length of drought |
|---|---|---|
| HFX Wanderers FC | never (club joined in 2019) | 8 seasons |
| Inter Toronto FC | never (club joined in 2019) | 8 seasons |
| Valour FC † | never (club joined in 2019; folded after 2025) | 7 seasons |
| FC Edmonton † | never (club joined in 2019, folded after 2022) | 4 seasons |
| Pacific FC | 2021 | 5 seasons |
| Vancouver FC | never (club joined in 2023) | 4 seasons |
| Forge FC | 2023 | 3 seasons |
| Atlético Ottawa | 2025 | 1 season |

=== CPL results in the Canadian Championship ===
Finals results by club
| Team | Won | Lost |
|---|---|---|
| Forge FC | 1 (2026) | 1 (2020) |
| Vancouver FC | 0 | 1 (2025) |

Annual results
| Season | Club(s) with best result | Final position | Eliminated by |
|---|---|---|---|
| 2019 | Cavalry FC | Semi-finals | Montreal Impact (MLS) |
| 2020 (Note: Tournament played in 2022 due to scheduling reasons related to the COVID-19 pandemic.) | Forge FC | Runner-up | Toronto FC (MLS) |
| 2021 | Forge FC | Semi-finals | CF Montréal (MLS) |
| 2021 | Pacific FC | Semi-finals | Toronto FC (MLS) |
| 2022 | York United FC | Semi-finals | Vancouver Whitecaps FC (MLS) |
| 2023 | Forge FC | Semi-finals | CF Montréal (MLS) |
| 2023 | Pacific FC | Semi-finals | Vancouver Whitecaps FC (MLS) |
| 2024 | Forge FC | Semi-finals | Toronto FC (MLS) |
| 2024 | Pacific FC | Semi-finals | Vancouver Whitecaps FC (MLS) |
| 2025 | Vancouver FC | Runner-up | Vancouver Whitecaps FC (MLS) |
| 2026 | Forge FC | Champions | —N/a |

== Game statistics ==
=== Largest victories ===
| Date | Winning margin | Home team | Result | Away team |
|---|---|---|---|---|
| September 2, 2019 | 8 | Valour FC | 0–8 | Cavalry FC |
| September 25, 2026 | 6 | Cavalry FC | 6–0 | Supra du Québec |
| September 15, 2020 | 5 | HFX Wanderers FC | 0–5 | Pacific FC |
| April 24, 2022 | 5 | Atlético Ottawa | 1–6 | Valour FC |
| May 13, 2023 | 5 | Vancouver FC | 0–5 | Atlético Ottawa |
| June 22, 2025 | 5 | Valour FC | 0–5 | Forge FC |
| August 2, 2025 | 5 | Forge FC | 5–0 | Valour FC |
| August 1, 2026 | 5 | Cavalry FC | 5–0 | Inter Toronto FC |
| October 4, 2026 | 5 | FC Supra du Québec | 5–0 | Pacific FC |
| October 12, 2026 | 5 | Forge FC | 5–0 | Inter Toronto FC |

=== Highest scoring games ===
| Date | Total goals | Home team | Result | Away team | Ref |
|---|---|---|---|---|---|
| June 2, 2023 | 9 | Vancouver FC | 3–6 | Pacific FC | |
| August 17, 2025 | 9 | Cavalry FC | 5–4 | Vancouver FC | |
| July 27, 2019 | 8 | York9 FC | 6–2 | HFX Wanderers FC | |
| September 2, 2019 | 8 | Valour FC | 0–8 | Cavalry FC | |
| June 27, 2025 | 8 | Pacific FC | 4–4 | Vancouver FC | |
| June 9, 2026 | 8 | Atlético Ottawa | 5–3 | Supra du Quebec | |
| October 12, 2021 | 7 | FC Edmonton | 3–4 | Atlético Ottawa | |
| April 24, 2022 | 7 | Atlético Ottawa | 1–6 | Valour FC | |
| May 31, 2022 | 7 | FC Edmonton | 3–4 | Forge FC | |
| June 25, 2023 | 7 | Forge FC | 4–3 | Atlético Ottawa | |
| June 28, 2024 | 7 | Atlético Ottawa | 4–3 | Forge FC | |
| May 10, 2025 | 7 | Atlético Ottawa | 5–2 | Valour FC | |
| June 26, 2026 | 7 | HFX Wanderers FC | 5–2 | Pacific FC | |
| August 12, 2026 | 7 | Inter Toronto FC | 4–3 | HFX Wanderers FC | |
| August 30, 2026 | 7 | Pacific FC | 4–3 | HFX Wanderers FC | |
| September 27, 2026 | 7 | Inter Toronto FC | 3–4 | Pacific FC | |
| October 25, 2026 | 7 | HFX Wanderers FC | 3–4 | Supra du Quebec | |

== Attendance records ==
- Highest Attendance; 17,971, Forge FC vs Atlético Ottawa, May 13, 2025
- Lowest Attendance; 0, 2020 Island Games

=== Seasonal average attendances ===
Best average season's attendance for each team in bold.

| Season | Regular season average (excluding playoffs) | | | | | | | | | |
| Season | Atlético Ottawa | Cavalry | FC Edmonton | Forge | HFX Wanderers | Pacific | Valour | Vancouver | Inter Toronto | League average |
|---|---|---|---|---|---|---|---|---|---|---|
| **2019** | – | 3,292 | **2,905** | 6,588 | 6,061 | 3,102 | **5,335** | – | **2,668** | **4,279** |
| **2020** (Note: Season played behind closed doors due to COVID-19 pandemic at neutral venue on Prince Edward Island.) | – | – | – | – | – | – | – | – | – | – |
| **2021** | 3,618 | 2,544 | 961 | 3,378 | 5,198 | 2,627 | 2,368 | – | 1,118 | 2,710 |
| **2022** | 4,069 | 3,492 | 1,071 | 3,631 | 5,825 | 3,178 | 3,111 | – | 1,234 | 3,197 |
| **2023** | 4,959 | 4,090 | – | 5,318 | 5,854 | **3,241** | 3,220 | 2,788 | 1,200 | 3,858 |
| **2024** | **5,483** | 4,223 | – | 5,279 | 6,058 | 3,041 | 3,106 | **3,161** | 1,499 | 3,981 |
| **2025** | 4,706 | **4,270** | | **6,932** | **6,459** | 2,961 | 3,213 | 1,389 | 2,055 | 3,998 |

== See also ==
- Canadian Premier League Awards
- Canadian soccer clubs in international competitions
