= OneSoccer =

Canadian subscription over-the-top streaming service

- Country: Canada (TV and streaming); Global (streaming-only)
- Broadcast area: National

Programming
- Languages: English, French

Ownership
- Owner: Timeless, Inc.

History
- Launched: April 26, 2019; 7 years ago

Links
- Website: onesoccer.ca

Availability

Streaming media
- OneSoccer: watch.onesoccer.ca
- FuboTV Canada: www.fubo.tv/welcome

OneSoccer is a Canadian soccer-oriented sports channel and subscription streaming service owned by Timeless, Inc., a company affiliated with Canadian Soccer Media & Entertainment (CSME) and the Canadian Premier League (CPL).

The service was first established in 2019 as part of a ten-year agreement between CSME, a company that represents the commercial rights of the Canadian Soccer Association (CSA) and CPL, and Mediapro. Initially distributed as a streaming service only, the network began to pursue linear television distribution as a discretionary specialty channel in September 2021. It serves as the main Canadian broadcaster of the CPL and Canada's men's and women's national teams, as well as CONCACAF competitions such as the CONCACAF Gold Cup and Champions Cup.

In June 2024, amid contractual disputes between CSME and Mediapro, the organization reached a settlement to unwind its agreement with Mediapro at the end of the year.

== History ==
On March 28, 2019, the Canadian Premier League and the Canadian Soccer Association announced the creation of Canadian Soccer Media & Entertainment (then known as Canadian Soccer Business), an organization "representing commercial assets and inventory for marquee soccer properties in Canada", including "all corporate partnerships and broadcast rights related to Canada Soccer's core assets including its national teams, along with all rights associated with the CPL". On February 21, 2019, it announced a 10-year agreement with Mediapro, under which it holds all media rights associated with Canada Soccer, including rights to the Canadian Premier League, the Canadian Championship, and rights to national team matches. In April, Mediapro announced that its rights would be housed in a new subscription service known as OneSoccer, which launched as an online-only live and on-demand subscription service through its website on April 26, 2019, with its first live match airing the next day.

In August 2019, OneSoccer acquired rights to the 2019–20 CONCACAF Nations League season. In January 2020, OneSoccer acquired exclusive Canadian rights to various CONCACAF championships through 2023, including the CONCACAF Gold Cup.

In September 2021, Mediapro Canada announced OneSoccer's first third-party launch of the service via FuboTV's streaming package in Canada. Later that month, Mediapro Canada announced that it had reached its first deal for carriage of OneSoccer as a linear television channel, with Telus TV. The channel operates as an exempted discretionary service owned by Timeless, Inc. – a majority-Canadian owned company led by CPL and CSME chairman Scott Mitchell; Mediapro was responsible for day-to-day operations (including production and technical services) under the direction of Timeless, as Mediapro cannot hold a broadcast license due to being a foreign company. The CRTC ruled that the arrangement was in compliance with its ownership rules, as Timeless held effective control by reserving the rights to "make strategic or organizational changes".

On August 5, 2022, OneSoccer filed a complaint with the CRTC against Rogers Communications, alleging that Rogers refused to carry OneSoccer in order to protect its own Sportsnet service from competition. On March 23, 2023, the CRTC found that Rogers had indeed given undue preference to Sportsnet, as well as other independent broadcasters BeIN Sports and EuroWorld Sport.

In January 2024, five years into the ten-year agreement, CSME withdrew its contract from Mediapro alleging violations of contractual obligations, including missed rights payments for 2023, and insufficient efforts to sublicense linear television rights to other broadcasters to widen availability. Mediapro contrarily accused CSME of not meeting targets for expansion of the CPL and the provision of matches. The dispute did not interrupt OneSoccer's programming; in June, the legal dispute was settled out of court. As a result of the settlement, Mediapro withdrew from its involvement with CSME and OneSoccer at the end of December 2024, after which Timeless subcontracted day-to-day operations of OneSoccer to the Canadian company MidPro.

In March 2025, OneSoccer announced an agreement with TSN which would allow TSN to simulcast and co-produce broadcasts of the 2025 CONCACAF Nations League Finals and select matches from the Canadian Premier League.

== Staff ==
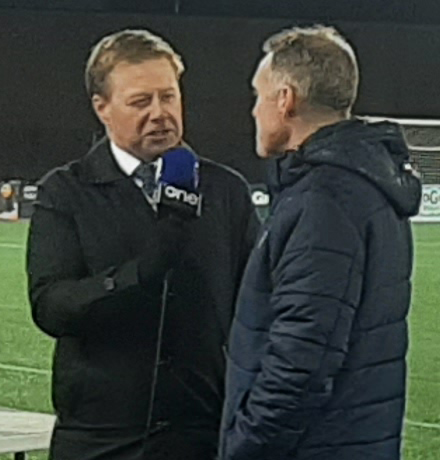
Kristian Jack, broadcaster and reporter for OneSoccer.

As of 2025, OneSoccer's commentary, digital and broadcast team includes Andi Petrillo, James Sharman, Kristian Jack, Gareth Wheeler, Terry Dunfield, Oliver Platt, Jordan Wilson, Adam Jenkins, Jimmy Brennan, Nigel Reed, Armen Bedakian, Mackenzie Barwell and Alexandre Gangué-Ruzic.

== Broadcasting rights ==
=== Clubs ===
- CONCACAF Champions Cup
- UEFA Women's Champions League
- Canadian Premier League
- Canadian Championship
- NWSL (USA)
- Bundesliga

=== National teams ===
- CONCACAF Nations League
- Canadian men's and women's national soccer teams' matches

== See also ==
- Téléfoot, a former French soccer-oriented channel that closed in 2021 after the collapse of a Mediapro agreement with the French Football Federation.
