= Malcolm Duncan (soccer) =

Canadian soccer player (born 1999)

Personal information
- Date of birth: September 4, 1999 (age 27)
- Place of birth: Toronto, Ontario, Canada
- Position: Right-back

Youth career
- Sigma FC

College career
Years	Team	Apps	(Gls)
2017–2021	Providence Friars	86	(0)

Senior career*
Years	Team	Apps	(Gls)
2016–2019	Sigma FC	20	(0)
2022	Sigma FC	12	(1)
2022	→ Forge FC (loan)	2	(0)
2023–2024	Forge FC	37	(0)
2023	→ Sigma FC (loan)	1	(0)
- * Club domestic league appearances and goals as of October 22, 2024

Malcolm Duncan (born September 4, 1999) is a Canadian professional soccer player.

== Early life ==
Duncan played youth soccer with Sigma FC. He is of Canadian, Jamaican, and British descent.

== College career ==
In 2017, he began attending Providence College, where he played for the men's soccer team. He earned his first collegiate point, picking up an assist, on September 9, 2017, against the Harvard Crimson. In 2019, he earned the team's David Kreinsen Unsung Hero Award. In January 2021, ahead of his senior season (for the delayed 2020 season due to the COVID-19 pandemic), he was named team captain. In May 2021, after the Spring 2021 season, he was given the Sine Qua Non Award, given to the athlete who has distinguished themself among their peers without receiving proper recognition. After the Fall 2021 season, he was named to the All-BIG EAST Third Team.

== Club career ==
Duncan began his senior career with Sigma FC in League1 Ontario. In June 2022, he joined Canadian Premier League club Forge FC on a short-term loan. He made his debut for Forge on June 12 against Pacific FC.

In 2023, he signed with Canadian Premier League club Forge FC. He also spent some time on loan with Sigma, who served as Forge's affiliate club. In October 2023, he helped Forge win their fourth league title, following a 2–1 win over Cavalry FC in the play-off final. After the 2024 season, he departed the club.

== Career statistics ==
As of November 9, 2024

Club statistics
Club	Season	League			Playoffs		National Cup		Continental		Total	
Club	Season	Division	Apps	Goals	Apps	Goals	Apps	Goals	Apps	Goals	Apps	Goals
Sigma FC	2016	League1 Ontario	6	0	—		—		—		6	0
Sigma FC	2017	League1 Ontario	2	0	—		—		—		2	0
Sigma FC	2018	League1 Ontario	5	0	—		—		—		5	0
Sigma FC	2019	League1 Ontario	7	0	0	0	—		—		7	0
Sigma FC	2022	League1 Ontario	12	1	—		—		—		12	1
Sigma FC	Total		32	1	0	0	0	0	0	0	32	1
Forge FC (loan)	2022	Canadian Premier League	2	0	0	0	0	0	0	0	2	0
Forge FC	2023	Canadian Premier League	10	0	0	0	0	0	—		10	0
Forge FC	2024	Canadian Premier League	27	0	3	0	5	0	2	0	37	0
Forge FC	Total		39	0	3	0	5	0	2	0	49	0
Sigma FC (loan)	2023	League1 Ontario	1	0	—		—		—		1	0
Career total			62	1	3	0	5	0	2	0	72	1
