= Gareth Wheeler =

Canadian sports broadcaster

- Born: Burlington, Ontario, Canada
- Occupation: broadcaster

Gareth Wheeler is a Canadian sports broadcaster and radio host for The Sports Network (TSN) and TSN 1050 Radio, based in Toronto, Ontario. He currently serves as the radio voice of Toronto FC on TSN 1050 for games involving TFC on the TSN family of networks.

== Career ==
Wheeler started his career as an editorial assistant at TSN. His first on-air job was hosting Sportsweek on TV Cogeco in Halton Region and in radio at CHRW while at Western. In 2006, Wheeler was hired as host of the Grill Room, a daily Toronto-based sports talk show on Sun News Network for Quebecor Media. The Grill Room's regular panel featured Toronto Sun writers and columnists, other sports media personalities, and professional athletes. Wheeler hosted over 1200 episodes of the show, interviewing the well known athletes and personalities in the sports world. Wheeler also served as sports segment host for Sun TV's daily current affair program, Canoe Live and co-hosted an original fantasy sports program, Fantasy Sports: the 411.

In 2007, he became national soccer columnist for the Toronto Sun and Sun Media with a specific focus on Toronto FC and the Canadian National teams. In 2010, Wheeler covered the FIFA World Cup in South Africa as reporter/columnist for the National newspaper chain while filing daily hits for television.

Wheeler moved back to the TSN family in 2011 as producer and on-air personality for the Drive Home radio show on TSN 1050, Cybulski & Company. He hosted TSN Radio's national coverage of EURO 2012 and currently hosts and provides play-by-play for Toronto FC soccer, as well as hosts TSN 1050's Game Night. He also is a soccer writer for TSN.ca, and is called upon by various other media to provide sports commentary.

Wheeler is also an in-studio host for TSN 1050's Toronto Raptors coverage and provides colour commentary for the Raptors G-League affiliate, Raptors 905.

Wheeler co-hosts Toronto FC's podcast Come on You Reds! alongside former Toronto FC midfielder Terry Dunfield. He also co-hosts the TSN's Jurassic Pod podcast with Toronto Raptors reporter Josh Lewenberg, looking at the Toronto Raptors and NBA news.

Since 2019, he has regularly provided play-by-play on Canadian Premier League, Canadian Championship, and Canada National Team matches on OneSoccer.

== Personal life ==
Wheeler was born in Burlington, Ontario. He graduated from the University of Western Ontario, where he won a National Championship as a five-year member of the Western Mustangs Men's Soccer team and was a Syl Basacco Award winner.

Wheeler has been battling melanoma since 2005. He has become an out-spoken voice for melanoma awareness and sits on the board of directors for the Melanoma Network of Canada.
