= Ali Musse =

Somali footballer (born 1996)

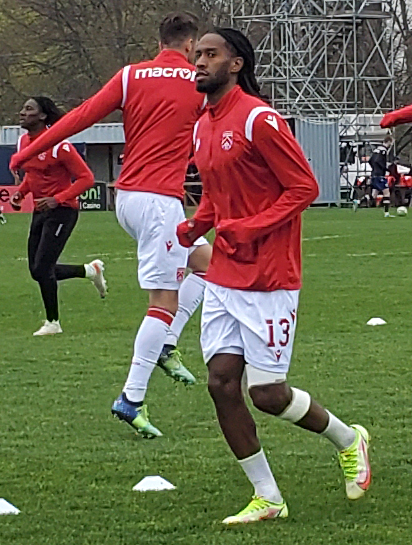
- Ali Musse with Cavalry in 2022

Personal information
- Date of birth: 1 January 1996 (age 30)
- Place of birth: Mogadishu, Somalia
- Height: 1.82 m (6 ft 0 in)
- Position: Winger

Team information
- Current team: Cavalry FC
- Number: 7

Youth career
- 2005: Earl Grey CC
- 2005–2009: Winnipeg South End United SC
- 2010–2011: WSA Winnipeg
- 2011: Vancouver Whitecaps FC
- 2014–2015: Vancouver Whitecaps FC

College career
| Years | Team | Apps | (Gls) |
| 2015 | Tyler Apaches | 17 | (10) |
| 2017 | NAIT Ooks | 9 | (8) |

Senior career*
| Years | Team | Apps | (Gls) |
| 2011–2013 | WSA Winnipeg | 39 | (10) |
| 2014 | Vancouver Whitecaps U-23 | 4 | (2) |
| 2015–2016 | WSA Winnipeg | 4 | (0) |
| 2017–2018 | Calgary Foothills | 22 | (7) |
| 2019 | Valour FC | 13 | (2) |
| 2020 | 1. FCA Darmstadt | 2 | (1) |
| 2021– | Cavalry FC | 123 | (34) |

International career^{‡}
| 2013 | Canada U17 | 6 | (0) |
| 2019– | Somalia | 10 | (0) |
Medal record
Men's football
Representing Canada
CONCACAF U-17 Championship
| Third place | 2013 Panama | Team |
- * Club domestic league appearances and goals as of 25 October 2026 ‡ National team caps and goals as of November 12, 2026

Ali Musse (born 1 January 1996) is a professional footballer who plays as a winger for Canadian Premier League club Cavalry FC and the Somalia national team.

== Early life ==
Born in Somalia, Ali moved to Canada at a young age. He began playing youth football with Earl Grey Community Centre. From 2005 to 2009, he played with Winnipeg South End United SC. In 2010, he began playing with WSA Winnipeg. He also played for the Manitoba provincial team in 2009 and 2011. In 2011, he joined the Vancouver Whitecaps Academy. After returning to WSA Winnipeg, he returned to the Whitecaps Academy in 2014. In 2013, he was awarded the Manitoba Soccer Special Achievement Award.

== College career ==
In 2015, he attended Tyler Junior College, where he played for the men's soccer team. He scored two goals in his debut over Jacksonville College on 29 August. With Tyler, he advanced to the national finals, where they were defeated by the Louisburg College Hurricances.

In 2017, he began attending the Northern Alberta Institute of Technology. He made his debut on 9 September, scoring all four goals in a 4–1 victory over the University of Alberta-Augustana, earning Player of the Game honours.

== Club career ==
From 2011 to 2013, he played for WSA Winnipeg in the Premier Development League. In 2014, while with the Vancouver Whitecaps Academy, he also played with the Vancouver Whitecaps U23 in the PDL. Afterwards, he returned to WSA Winnipeg.

In 2017, Musse began playing for the Calgary Foothills. In the season debut on 5 May 2017, he scored the winning goal in a 4–3 victory over the TSS FC Rovers. He helped the team reach the PDL final in 2017. In 2018, he scored five goals in four playoff games as the Foothills won the PDL title, including scoring two goals in extra time in the championship final victory over Reading United AC.

In February 2019, Musse signed a professional contract with Canadian Premier League club Valour FC, from his hometown of Winnipeg. FC Edmonton had also sought to sign him, with his family now based out of Edmonton, but he chose to return to Winnipeg and sign with Valour to re-unite with head coach Rob Gale who he had played for during his time in the Canada national team program. He scored his first goal on 2 June 2019, against FC Edmonton in a 1–0 victory. Ahead of the 2020 season, he was released by the club.

In 2020, he signed with German club 1. FCA Darmstadt in the seventh-tier Gruppenliga.

=== Cavalry FC ===
In June 2021, Musse returned to Calgary and signed with Canadian club Cavalry FC on a one-year contract. On 14 July 2022, he scored a brace in a 3–0 victory over HFX Wanderers FC. He missed much of his first season due to injury. On 2 October 2022, he scored the winning goal in a 2–1 victory over Valour FC to clinch a playoff spot for the club. Musse led the club in scoring in 2022 with seven goals and four assists, across all competitions. In January 2023, Musse signed a new two-year deal with Cavalry, with an option for 2025. At the end of the 2023 season, Musse won the CPL Player's Player of the Year award and was named to the CPL Best XI. On 3 August 2024, he scored a brace in a 2–1 victory over Atlético Ottawa, in his first match following a three-month absence due to injury.

Upon conclusion of the 2025 season, the club announced that it was unlikely that Musse would re-sign for 2026. However, in March 2026 Musse would sign a 3 year contract extension, keeping him with the club through the 2028 season.

== International career ==
=== Canada ===
In the summer of 2007, he attended a Canada national team evaluation camp. In November 2011, Musse received his first Canadian youth national team call-up for a Canada U16 camp in Costa Rica. He was subsequently named to the squad for the 2013 CONCACAF U-17 Championship, where he won a bronze medal, as well as playing at the 2013 FIFA U-17 World Cup.

=== Somalia ===
In December 2019, Musse was called up by Somalia for the 2019 CECAFA Cup. He made his debut as a starter in the opening match in a 0–0 draw against Djibouti.

== Personal ==
Musse is a devout Muslim and maintains the Ramadan fast during the football season.

== Career statistics ==
As of November 21, 2026

Appearances and goals by club, season and competition
| Club | Season | League | | | Playoffs | | National cup | | Continental | | Total | |
| Club | Season | Division | Apps | Goals | Apps | Goals | Apps | Goals | Apps | Goals | Apps | Goals |
|---|---|---|---|---|---|---|---|---|---|---|---|---|
| WSA Winnipeg | 2011 | PDL | 13 | 2 | — | | — | | — | | 13 | 2 |
| WSA Winnipeg | 2012 | PDL | 12 | 2 | — | | — | | — | | 12 | 2 |
| WSA Winnipeg | 2013 | PDL | 14 | 6 | — | | — | | — | | 14 | 6 |
| WSA Winnipeg | Total | | 39 | 10 | 0 | 0 | 0 | 0 | 0 | 0 | 39 | 10 |
| Vancouver Whitecaps FC U-23 | 2014 | PDL | 4 | 2 | 1 | 0 | — | | — | | 5 | 2 |
| WSA Winnipeg | 2015 | PDL | 1 | 0 | — | | — | | — | | 1 | 0 |
| WSA Winnipeg | 2016 | PDL | 3 | 0 | — | | — | | — | | 3 | 0 |
| WSA Winnipeg | Total | | 4 | 0 | 0 | 0 | 0 | 0 | 0 | 0 | 4 | 0 |
| Calgary Foothills | 2017 | PDL | 13 | 4 | 1 | 0 | — | | — | | 13 | 4 |
| Calgary Foothills | 2018 | PDL | 9 | 3 | 4 | 5 | — | | — | | 13 | 8 |
| Calgary Foothills | Total | | 22 | 7 | 5 | 5 | 0 | 0 | 0 | 0 | 27 | 12 |
| Valour FC | 2019 | Canadian Premier League | 13 | 2 | — | | 2 | 0 | — | | 15 | 2 |
| 1. FCA Darmstadt | 2020-21 | Gruppenliga Darmstadt | 2 | 1 | — | | 0 | 0 | — | | 2 | 1 |
| Cavalry FC | 2021 | Canadian Premier League | 8 | 2 | 1 | 0 | — | | — | | 9 | 2 |
| Cavalry FC | 2022 | Canadian Premier League | 27 | 7 | 2 | 0 | 2 | 0 | — | | 31 | 7 |
| Cavalry FC | 2023 | Canadian Premier League | 25 | 5 | 3 | 2 | 1 | 0 | — | | 29 | 7 |
| Cavalry FC | 2024 | Canadian Premier League | 16 | 4 | 2 | 0 | 2 | 0 | 2 | 0 | 22 | 4 |
| Cavalry FC | 2025 | Canadian Premier League | 23 | 9 | 3 | 1 | 3 | 1 | 2 | 0 | 33 | 9 |
| Cavalry FC | 2026 | Canadian Premier League | 24 | 6 | 3 | 1 | 3 | 1 | 0 | 0 | 30 | 8 |
| Cavalry FC | Total | | 123 | 33 | 14 | 4 | 11 | 2 | 4 | 0 | 152 | 39 |
| Career total | | | 208 | 56 | 20 | 9 | 12 | 2 | 4 | 0 | 243 | 69 |

== Honours ==
Tyler Apaches

- NJCAA Division 1 Tournament runner-up: 2015

Calgary Foothills

- USL League Two: 2018
- Western Conference: 2018
- Northwest Division: 2018

Cavalry FC

- Canadian Premier League: 2024
- CPL Shield: 2023

Canada U17

- CONCACAF U-17 Championship third place: 2013

Individual

- Manitoba Soccer Special Achievement Award: 2013
- Canadian Premier League Player's Player of the Year: 2023
- Canadian Premier League Best XI: 2023, 2024
- Somali Football Awards Moment of the Year: 2023
- Cavalry FC Most Assists: 2025
- Cavalry FC Most Goals and Assists: 2025

Records

- Canadian Premier League All Time Top Scorers
- Canadian Premier League All Time Assists Leaders
- Calgary Foothills All Time Top Scorers
- Cavalry FC–Forge FC rivalry All Time Top Scorers
